= Macauley Jones =

Australian racing driver

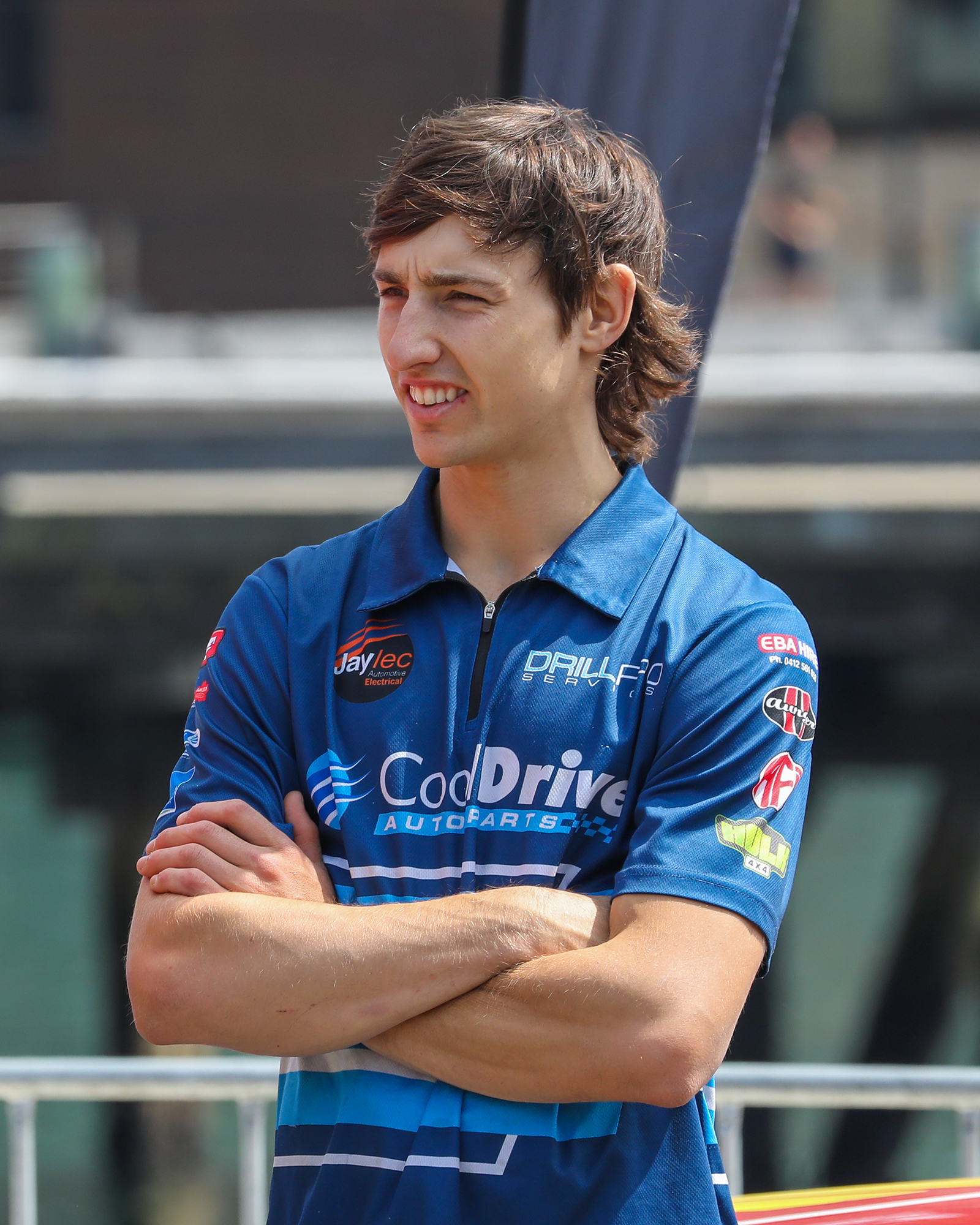
- Jones at the Adelaide 500 in 2020
- Nationality: Australian
- Born: 8 October 1994 (age 32) Albury, New South Wales
- Relatives: Brad Jones (father); Madison Jones (sister); Montana Jones (sister); Andrew Jones (cousin); Kim Jones (uncle)

Supercars Championship career
- Current team: Brad Jones Racing
- Championships: 0
- Races: 257
- Wins: 0
- Podiums: 0
- Pole positions: 0
- 2022 position: 19th (1282 pts)

Macauley Jones (born 8 October 1994) is an Australian racing driver who competes in the Repco Supercars Championship, driving the No. 96 Toyota GR Supra for Brad Jones Racing.

Son of Brad, nephew of Kim and cousin of Andrew, Jones comes from a family with a large history in Australian motorsport. He has continued the family success having won the 2011 South Australian Rotax Light Championship in karting, and having won races in the 2012 and 2013 season of Australian Formula Ford.

Jones has competed with his father's team in the Dunlop Super2 Series since 2014. His Supercars Championship debut came at the 2015 Wilson Security Sandown 500 alongside Dale Wood.

== Career results ==
=== Karting career summary ===
Season	Series	Position
2008	Australian Capital Territory Kart Championship - Junior National Heavy	**1st**
2008	South Australian Kart Championship - Junior National Heavy	**3rd**
2008	Australian Rotax Nationals - Junior Max	9th
2009	Australian National Sprint Kart Championship - Junior National Heavy	**3rd**
2009	New South Wales Kart Championship - Formula JMA	**1st**
2009	New South Wales Kart Championship - Junior National Heavy	4th
2009	Queensland Sprint Kart Championship - Junior National Heavy	**1st**
2009	South Australian Kart Championship - Junior National Heavy	**2nd**
2009	South Australian Kart Championship - Formula JMA	4th
2009	Australian Rotax Nationals - Junior Max	**3rd**
2010	Australian National Sprint Kart Championship - Junior National Heavy	**3rd**
2011	South Australian Karting Championship - Rotax Light	**1st**
2011	Australian National Sprint Kart Championship - Clubman Heavy	37th
2011	Australian National Sprint Kart Championship - Clubman Light	7th
2011	Sprint Kart USA Super Nationals - KZ2	13th
2011	Australian Rotax Nationals - Rotax Light	12th
2011	CIK Stars of Karting - Pro Gearbox KZ2	6th
2011	Brian Farley Memorial - Pro Clubman	**1st**
2016	Asia Pacific Kart Championship - KZ2	8th
2018	Australian National Sprint Kart Championship - KZ2	26th
2021	Australian National Sprint Kart Championship - KZ2	19th
2023	Australian National Sprint Kart Championship - KZ2	30th

=== Circuit career summary ===
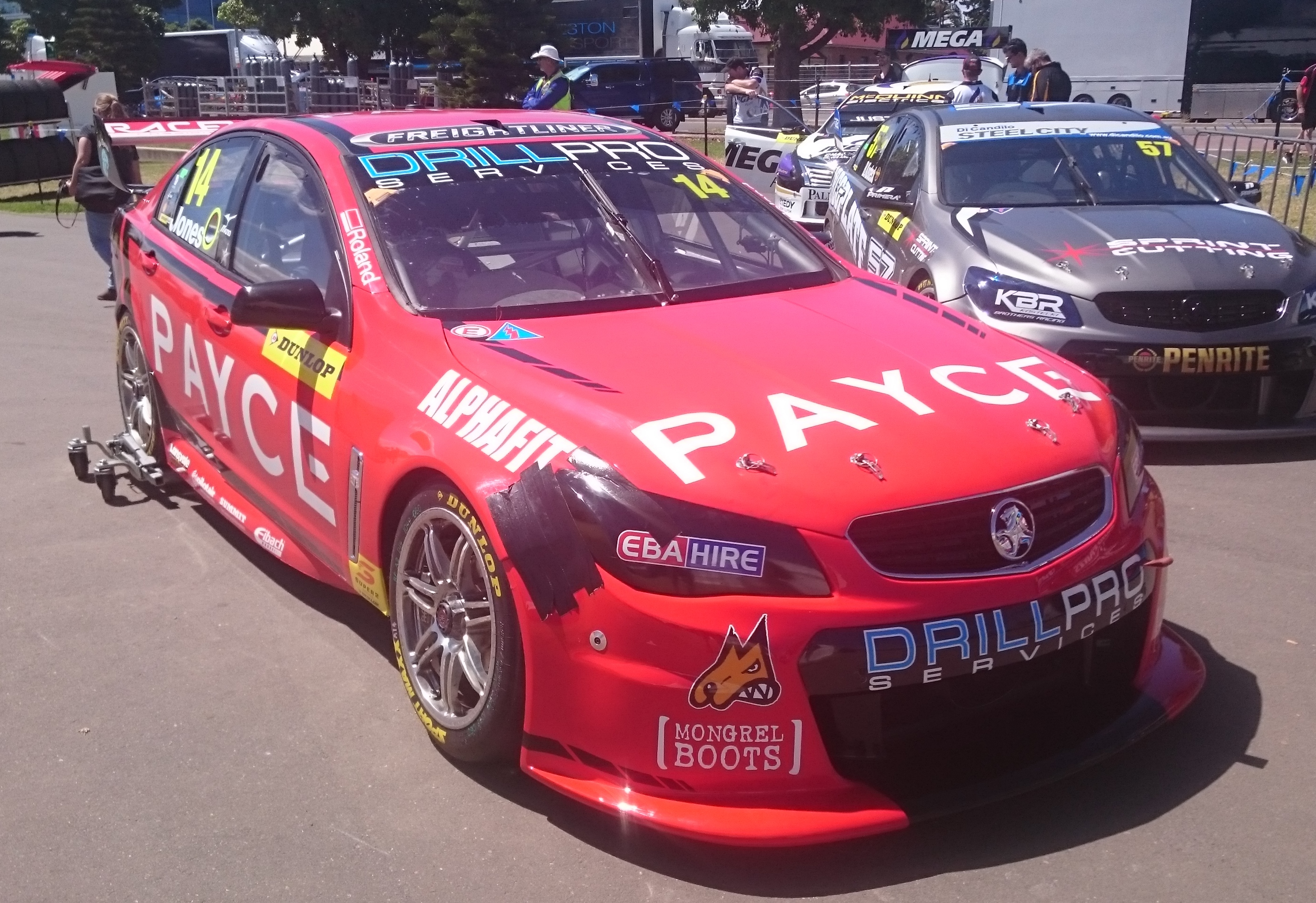
Jones placed ninth in the 2018 Dunlop Super2 Series driving a Holden Commodore VF for Brad Jones Racing

Season	Series	Position	Car	Team
2012	Australian Formula Ford Championship	5th	Mygale SJ11A	CAMS Rising Stars/Minda Motorsport
2012	New South Wales Formula Ford Championship	5th	Mygale SJ09A	Brad Jones Racing
2012	Victoria Formula Ford Championship	7th	Mygale SJ09A	Brad Jones Racing
2013	Australian Formula Ford Championship	4th	Mygale SJ13a	CAMS Rising Stars/Minda Motorsport
2014	Toyota Racing Series	18th	Tatuus TT104ZZ	M2 Competition
2014	Dunlop V8 Supercar Series	22nd	Holden VE Commodore	Brad Jones Racing
2015	V8 Supercars Dunlop Series	12th	Holden VE Commodore	Brad Jones Racing
2015	International V8 Supercars Championship	45th	Holden VF Commodore	Britek Motorsport
2016	V8 Supercars Dunlop Series	9th	Holden VF Commodore	Brad Jones Racing
2016	International V8 Supercars Championship	42nd	Holden VF Commodore	Britek Motorsport
2017	Dunlop Super2 Series	7th	Holden VF Commodore	Brad Jones Racing
2017	Virgin Australia Supercars Championship	45th	Holden VF Commodore	Brad Jones Racing
2018	Dunlop Super2 Series	9th	Holden VF Commodore	Brad Jones Racing
2018	Virgin Australia Supercars Championship	42nd	Holden ZB Commodore	Brad Jones Racing
2019	Virgin Australia Supercars Championship	21st	Holden ZB Commodore	Tim Blanchard Racing
2020	Virgin Australia Supercars Championship	19th	Holden ZB Commodore	Tim Blanchard Racing
2021	Repco Supercars Championship	23rd	Holden ZB Commodore	Brad Jones Racing
2022	Repco Supercars Championship	19th	Holden ZB Commodore	Brad Jones Racing
2023	Repco Supercars Championship	22nd	Chevrolet Camaro ZL1	Brad Jones Racing
2024	Repco Supercars Championship	22nd	Chevrolet Camaro ZL1	Brad Jones Racing
2025	Repco Supercars Championship	21st	Chevrolet Camaro ZL1	Brad Jones Racing

=== Complete Toyota Racing Series results ===
(key) (Races in bold indicate pole position) (Races in italics indicate fastest lap)

Year	Entrant	1	2	3	4	5	6	7	8	9	10	11	12	13	14	15	Pos	Points
2014	M2 Competition	TER; 1; 17	TER; 2 Ret	TER; 3; 5	TIM; 1 Ret	TIM; 2; 14	TIM; 3 NC	HIG; 1; 16	HIG; 2 Ret	HIG; 3; 14	HMP; 1; 12	HMP; 2; 7	HMP; 3; 6	MAN; 1; 9	MAN; 2; 4	MAN; 3 Ret	18th	340

==== Complete New Zealand Grand Prix results ====
Year	Team	Car	Qualifying	Main race
2014	(New Zealand) M2 Competition	Tatuus TT104ZZ - Toyota	10th	DNF

=== Super2 Series results ===
Super2 Series results
Year	Team	No.	Car	1	2	3	4	5	6	7	8	9	10	11	12	13	14	15	16	17	18	19	20	21	Position	Points
2014	Brad Jones Racing	12	Holden VE Commodore	ADE; R1	ADE; R2	WIN; R3	WIN; R4	BAR; R5	BAR; R6	TOW; R7; 10	TOW; R8; 21	QLD; R9; 11	QLD; R10; 23	BAT; R11; 13	SYD; R12; 9	SYD; R13; Ret									22nd	444
2015	Brad Jones Racing	14	Holden VE Commodore	ADE; R1; 13	ADE; R2; 11	BAR; R3; 15	BAR; R4; 11	BAR; R5; 5	WIN; R6; Ret	WIN; R7; 16	WIN; R8; 16	TOW; R9; 9	TOW; R10; Ret	QLD; R11; 16	QLD; R12; 14	QLD; R13; 13	BAT; R14; 8	SYD; R15; 16	SYD; R16; 8						12th	911
2016	Brad Jones Racing	14	Holden VF Commodore	ADE; R1; 21	ADE; R2; 5	PHI; R3; 15	PHI; R4; 12	PHI; R5; 9	BAR; R6; 7	BAR; R7; 10	BAR; R8; 5	TOW; R9; 4	TOW; R10; 7	SAN; R11; 14	SAN; R12; 8	SAN; R13; 9	BAT; R14; 9	SYD; R15; 9	SYD; R16; Ret						9th	1111
2017	Brad Jones Racing	14	Holden VF Commodore	ADE; R1; 4	ADE; R2; 4	ADE; R3; 4	SYM; R4; 12	SYM; R5; Ret	SYM; R6; DNS	SYM; R7; DNS	PHI; R8; 9	PHI; R9; 8	PHI; R10; 10	PHI; R11; 9	TOW; R12; 7	TOW; R13; 12	SMP; R14; 6	SMP; R15; 5	SMP; R16; 8	SMP; R17; 2	SAN; R18; 9	SAN; R19; 19	NEW; R20; 17	NEW; R21; 2	7th	1154
2018	Brad Jones Racing	14	Holden VF Commodore	ADE; R1; 4	ADE; R2; 5	ADE; R3; 6	SYM; R4; 6	SYM; R5; 4	SYM; R6; 3	BAR; R7; 9	BAR; R8; 7	BAR; R9; 5	**TOW**; **R10**; Ret	TOW; R11; 22	SAN; R12; 5	SAN; R13; 4	**BAT**; **R14**; Ret	NEW; R15; 19	NEW; R16; C						9th	968

=== Supercars Championship results ===
Supercars results
Year	Team	No.	Car	1	2	3	4	5	6	7	8	9	10	11	12	13	14	15	16	17	18	19	20	21	22	23	24	25	26	27	28	29	30	31	32	33	34	35	36	37	Position	Points
2015	Britek Motorsport	21	Holden VF Commodore	ADE; R1	ADE; R2	ADE; R3	SYM; R4	SYM; R5	SYM; R6	BAR; R7; PO	BAR; R8; PO	BAR; R9; PO	WIN; R10; PO	WIN; R11; PO	WIN; R12; PO	HID; R13; PO	HID; R14; PO	HID; R15; PO	TOW; R16; PO	TOW; R17; PO	QLD; R18; PO	QLD; R19; PO	QLD; R20; PO	SMP; R21; PO	SMP; R22; PO	SMP; R23; PO	SAN; Q 21	SAN; R24; 20	BAT; R25; 15	SUR; R26; 11	SUR; R27; 20	PUK; R28	PUK; R29	PUK; R30	PHI; R31	PHI; R32	PHI; R33	SYD; R34	SYD; R35	SYD; R36	45th	327
2016	Britek Motorsport	21	Holden VF Commodore	ADE; R1	ADE; R2	ADE; R3	SYM; R4	SYM; R5	PHI; R6	PHI; R7	BAR; R8	BAR; R9	WIN; R10	WIN; R11	HID; R12	HID; R13	TOW; R14	TOW; R15	QLD; R16; PO	QLD; R17; PO	SMP; R18	SMP; R19	SAN; Q 15	SAN; R24; 20	BAT; R25; 10	SUR; R26; 14	SUR; R27; 18	PUK; R24	PUK; R25	PUK; R26	PUK; R27	SYD; R28	SYD; R29								42nd	360
2017	Brad Jones Racing	4	Holden VF Commodore	ADE; R1	ADE; R2	SYM; R3	SYM; R4	PHI; R5	PHI; R6	BAR; R7	BAR; R8	WIN; R9; 20	WIN; R10; 23	HID; R11; 24	HID; R12; 24	TOW; R13	TOW; R14	QLD; R15; PO	QLD; R16; PO	SMP; R17; PO	SMP; R18; PO																				45th	345
2017	Brad Jones Racing	8	Holden VF Commodore																			SAN; Q 12	SAN; R19; 22	BAT; R20; Ret	SUR; R21; 21	SUR; R22; 10	PUK; R23	PUK; R24	NEW; R25	NEW; R26											45th	345
2018	Brad Jones Racing	4	Holden ZB Commodore	ADE; R1	ADE; R2	MEL; R3	MEL; R4	MEL; R5	MEL; R6	SYM; R7	SYM; R8	PHI; R9	PHI; R10	BAR; R11	BAR; R12	WIN; R13; PO	WIN; R14; PO	HID; R15; 27	HID; R16; 24	TOW; R17	TOW; R18	QLD; R19; PO	QLD; R20; PO	SMP; R21	BEN; R23; 25	BEN; R23; 19															33rd	495
2018	Brad Jones Racing	8	Holden ZB Commodore																								SAN; QR; 5	SAN; R24; 24	BAT; R25; 7	SUR; R26; 6	SUR; R27; C	PUK; R28	PUK; R29	NEW; R30	NEW; R31						33rd	495
2019	Tim Blanchard Racing	21	Holden ZB Commodore	ADE; R1; DNS	ADE; R2; 23	MEL; R3; 19	MEL; R4; 22	MEL; R5; 20	MEL; R6; Ret	SYM; R7; 20	SYM; R8; 20	PHI; R9; 18	PHI; R10; 21	BAR; R11; 24	BAR; R12; 17	WIN; R13; 16	WIN; R14; 16	HID; R15; 22	HID; R16; 22	TOW; R17; 18	TOW; R18; 17	QLD; R19; 24	QLD; R20; 22	BEN; R21; 19	BEN; R22; 21	PUK; R23; 20	PUK; R24; 22	BAT; R25; 16	SUR; R26; 17	SUR; R27; 15	SAN; QR; 21	SAN; R28; 18	NEW; R29; 17	NEW; R30; 21							21st	1314
2020	Tim Blanchard Racing	3	Holden ZB Commodore	ADE; R1; 17	ADE; R2; 19	MEL; R3; C	MEL; R4; C	MEL; R5; C	MEL; R6; C	SMP1; R7; 18	SMP1; R8; 16	SMP1; R9; 20	SMP2; R10; 8	SMP2; R11; 22	SMP2; R12; 23	HID1; R13; Ret	HID1; R14; 23	HID1; R15; 18	HID2; R16; 17	HID2; R17; 23	HID2; R18; 18	TOW1; R19; Ret	TOW1; R20; 18	TOW1; R21; 21	TOW2; R22; 19	TOW2; R23; 18	TOW2; R24; 19	BEN1; R25; 20	BEN1; R26; 18	BEN1; R27; 12	BEN2; R28; 17	BEN2; R29; 14	BEN2; R30; 18	BAT; R31; 13							19th	980
2021	Brad Jones Racing	96	Holden ZB Commodore	BAT1; R1; Ret	BAT1; R2; 15	SAN; R3; 15	SAN; R4; Ret	SAN; R5; 18	SYM; R6; 19	SYM; R7; 20	SYM; R8; 20	BEN; R9; 22	BEN; R10; Ret	BEN; R11; 20	HID; R12; 17	HID; R13; 20	HID; R14; 20	TOW1; R15; 16	TOW1; R16; 14	TOW2; R17; Ret	TOW2; R18; Ret	TOW2; R19; Ret	SMP1; R20; 16	SMP1; R21; 16	SMP1; R22; 16	SMP2; R23; 13	SMP2; R24; 11	SMP2; R25; 20	SMP3; R26; 14	SMP3; R27; 18	SMP3; R28; 15	SMP4; R29; Ret	SMP4; R30; C	BAT2; R31; 12							23rd	988
2022	Brad Jones Racing	96	Holden ZB Commodore	SMP; R1; 22	SMP; R2; 21	SYM; R3; 19	SYM; R4; 16	SYM; R5; 19	MEL; R6; 6	MEL; R7; 11	MEL; R8; 23	MEL; R9; 18	BAR; R10; 15	BAR; R11; 19	BAR; R12; 16	WIN; R13; 15	WIN; R14; 19	WIN; R15; 19	HID; R16; 20	HID; R17; 17	HID; R18; 18	TOW; R19; 22	TOW; R20; 22	BEN; R21; 22	BEN; R22; 14	BEN; R23; 20	SAN; R24; 17	SAN; R25; 14	SAN; R26; 17	PUK; R27; Ret	PUK; R28; 13	PUK; R29; 17	BAT; R30; 13	SUR; R31; 20	SUR; R32; Ret	ADE; R33; 12	ADE; R34; 22				19th	1282
2023	Brad Jones Racing	96	Chevrolet Camaro ZL1	NEW; R1; 19	NEW; R2; 19	MEL; R3; 10	MEL; R4; 12	MEL; R5; Ret	MEL; R6; 7	BAR; R7; 24	BAR; R8; 16	BAR; R9; 20	SYM; R10; 22	SYM; R11; 21	SYM; R12; 19	HID; R13; 15	HID; R14; 7	HID; R15; 13	TOW; R16; 16	TOW; R17; 20	SMP; R18; 22	SMP; R19; 18	BEN; R20; 20	BEN; R21; 19	BEN; R22; 21	SAN; R23; 19	BAT; R24; 22	SUR; R25; 16	SUR; R26; Ret	ADE; R27; 17	ADE; R28; 22										22nd	1138
2024	Brad Jones Racing	96	Chevrolet Camaro ZL1	BAT1; R1; 19	BAT1; R2; 20	MEL; R3; 20	MEL; R4; 21	MEL; R5; 19	MEL; R6; 19	TAU; R7; 18	TAU; R8; 20	BAR; R9; 19	BAR; R10; 19	HID; R11; 18	HID; R12; 17	TOW; R13; 18	TOW; R14; 19	SMP; R15; 20	SMP; R16; 22	SYM; R17; 19	SYM; R18; 16	SAN; R19; 21	BAT; R20; 13	SUR; R21; 14	SUR; R22; 16	ADE; R23; 16	ADE; R24; 17														22nd	1219
2025	Brad Jones Racing	96	Chevrolet Camaro ZL1	SYD; R1; 20	SYD; R2; 15	SYD; R3; 18	MEL; R4; 14	MEL; R5; 14	MEL; R6; 13	MEL; R7; C	TAU; R8; Ret	TAU; R9; 16	TAU; R10; 19	SYM; R11; 22	SYM; R12; 5	SYM; R13; 13	BAR; R14; 22	BAR; R15; 20	BAR; R16; 13	HID; R17; 18	HID; R18; 19	HID; R19; 14	TOW; R20; 19	TOW; R21; 17	TOW; R22; 15	QLD; R23; 24	QLD; R24; 18	QLD; R25; 18	BEN; R26; 14	BAT; R27; 16	SUR; R28; 16	SUR; R29; 19	SAN; R30; 18	SAN; R31; 17	ADE; R32; 17	ADE; R33; 15	ADE; R34; 16				21st	1062
2026	Brad Jones Racing	96	Toyota GR Supra	SMP; R1; 22	SMP; R2; 23	SMP; R3; 10	MEL; R4; 21	MEL; R5; 20	MEL; R6; 11	MEL; R7; 10	TAU; R8; 16	TAU; R9; 18	CHR; R10; 22	CHR; R11; 18	CHR; R12; 23	CHR; R13; 16	SYM; R14; 20	SYM; R15; 19	SYM; R16; 15	HID; R20; 10	HID; R21; 16	HID; R22; 15	TOW; R23; 24	TOW; R24; 19	TOW; R25; Ret	BAR; R17; 23	BAR; R18; 23	BAR; R19; 21	QLD; R26	QLD; R27	QLD; R28	BEN; R28	BAT; R30	SUR; R31	SUR; R32	SAN; R33	SAN; R34	ADE; R35	ADE; R36	ADE; R37	22nd*	594*

=== Bathurst 1000 results ===
Year	Team	Car	Co-driver	Position	Laps
2015	Britek Motorsport	Holden Commodore VF	(Australia) Dale Wood	15th	161
2016	Britek Motorsport	Holden Commodore VF	(Australia) Tim Blanchard	10th	161
2017	Brad Jones Racing	Holden Commodore VF	(Australia) Nick Percat	DNF	160
2018	Brad Jones Racing	Holden Commodore ZB	(Australia) Nick Percat	7th	161
2019	Tim Blanchard Racing	Holden Commodore ZB	(Australia) Dean Canto	16th	160
2020	Tim Blanchard Racing	Holden Commodore ZB	(Australia) Tim Blanchard	13th	161
2021	Brad Jones Racing	Holden Commodore ZB	(New Zealand) Chris Pither	12th	161
2022	Brad Jones Racing	Holden Commodore ZB	(Australia) Jordan Boys	13th	161
2023	Brad Jones Racing	Chevrolet Camaro Mk.6	(Australia) Jordan Boys	22nd	149
2024	Brad Jones Racing	Chevrolet Camaro Mk.6	(Australia) Jordan Boys	13th	161
2025	Brad Jones Racing	Chevrolet Camaro Mk.6	(Australia) Jordan Boys	13th	159
