= Chris Pither =

New Zealand racing driver

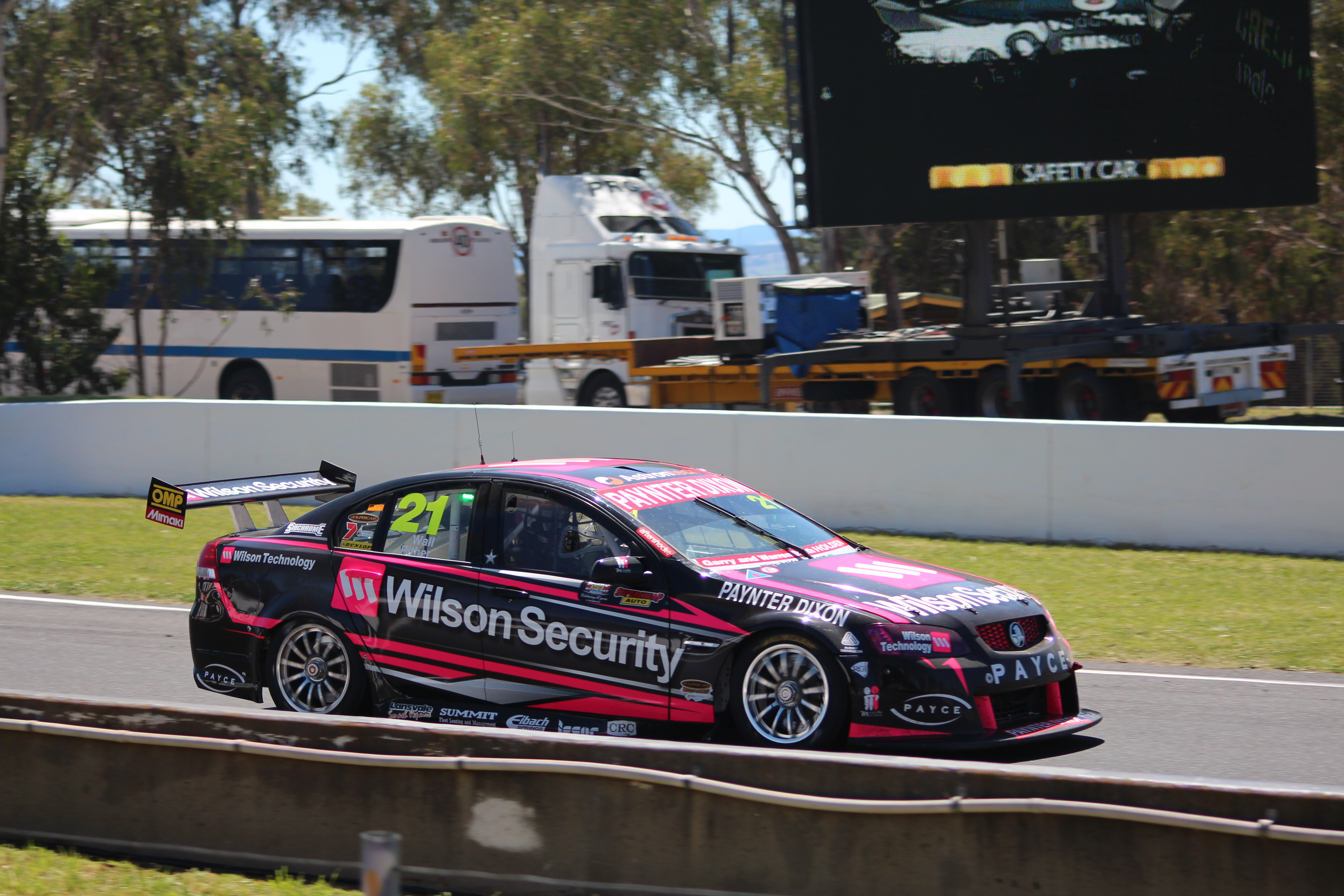
- Nationality: New Zealander
- Born: 3 December 1986 (age 39) Palmerston North, New Zealand
- Categorisation: FIA Silver

Supercars Championship career
- Current team: PremiAir Racing
- Championships: 0
- Races: 136
- Wins: 0
- Podiums: 0
- Pole positions: 1
- 2022 position: 20th (1257 pts)

Chris Pither (born 3 December 1986) is a New Zealand professional racing driver. Pither has won eight national championships including; three New Zealand karting titles, the New Zealand Holden HQ Series in 2003 and 2004, the NZ V8 Ute Championship Series in 2010 as well as the NZ and Australian V8 Ute Racing Series in 2011.

== Biography ==
Pither started racing in his home country, coming up through the open wheeler ranks first through the evolved Formula Vee class Formula First, then Formula Ford. After a couple of seasons racing in the one-make HQ Holden series, an impressive top five championship result in the inaugural Toyota Racing Series led to a move to Australia and two seasons in the popular V8 Utes series. For the 2006 season, Pither joined Brad Jones Racing in the second-tier Fujitsu V8 Supercar Series. A sporadic 2007 campaign, switching teams mid-season did not bring positive results, however still managed to join tail-marking main-game V8 Supercars outfit Team Kiwi Racing for four rounds during the 14-event season. After subbing for regular driver Kayne Scott at the Eastern Creek Raceway round, he then participated in a second round at the Winton Motor Raceway, although the results were not spectacular. The endurance races were particularly disappointing after an engine failure in practice saw Team Kiwi Racing withdraw from the L&H 500. Pither was involved in a major accident during practice for the Supercheap Auto 1000. Pither struck a stationary Paul Weel with a heavy impact at Reid Park corner, causing extensive damage to both cars and hospitalising Weel. The Falcon was miraculously repaired in time to start the race, but unfortunately was the race's first retirement. Pither parted ways with the team and he took a hiatus from racing in 2009.

Pither's return to V8 Supercars would come in 2012 when he signed to drive in the endurance races with David Wall in the No. 21 Brad Jones Racing Commodore - a signing that would lead Pither to a full-time drive in the Dunlop V8 Supercar Series.

In late November 2015, it was announced that Pither would be driving for Super Black Racing in 2016. He left the now-defunct team at end of 2016. Pither then moved to Erebus Motorsport to co-drive alongside Dale Wood in 2017. The pair recorded a best result of fourth, which came at the Bathurst 1000. For 2018 Pither has moved to Garry Rogers Motorsport as a co-driver.

In 2020, Pither signed to drive for Team Sydney by Tekno full time. Coca-Cola came onboard to sponsor him throughout the season. He drove the No. 22 Holden Commodore. His best finish in the season would be a fifth place at Hidden Valley. He would end the season finishing 20th in the points.

== Career results ==
Some results sourced from:

Season	Series	Position	Car	Team
1999/2000	New Zealand Formula First Championship	4th		
2001	New Zealand Formula Ford Championship	12th		
2003/04	New Zealand Formula Ford Championship	4th		
2003	New Zealand HQ Holden Series	1st	Holden Kingswood	
2004	New Zealand HQ Holden Series	1st	Holden Kingswood	
2005	Toyota Racing Series	5th	Tatuus-Toyota	
2006	Fujitsu V8 Supercar Series	11th	Ford AU Falcon	Brad Jones Racing
2006	V8 Supercar Championship Series	61st	Holden VZ Commodore	Team Kiwi Racing
2007	Fujitsu V8 Supercar Series	14th	Holden VZ Commodore; Holden VY Commodore	Hobson Motorsport; Greg Murphy Racing
2008	V8 Supercar Championship Series	50th	Ford BF Falcon	Team Kiwi Racing
2010	NZ V8 Ute Championship Series	1st	Ford Falcon XR8 Ute	Chris Pither Racing
2011	Australian V8 Ute Racing Series	1st	Holden VE Ute SS	IceBreak Racing
2012	V8SuperTourer Championship	21st	Ford FG Falcon	PS Racing
2012	Australian V8 Ute Racing Series	27th	Holden VE Ute SS	IceBreak Racing
2012	International V8 Supercars Championship	44th	Holden VE Commodore	Britek Motorsport
2013	Dunlop V8 Supercar Series	15th	Holden VE Commodore	Brad Jones Racing
2013	International V8 Supercars Championship	47th	Holden VF Commodore	Brad Jones Racing
2014	Dunlop V8 Supercar Series	4th	Holden VE Commodore	Brad Jones Racing
2014	International V8 Supercars Championship	49th	Holden VF Commodore	Brad Jones Racing
2015	V8 Supercars Dunlop Series	5th	Ford FG Falcon	MW Motorsport
2015	International V8 Supercars Championship	48th	Volvo S60; Ford FG X Falcon	Garry Rogers Motorsport; Super Black Racing
2016	International V8 Supercars Championship	21st	Ford FG X Falcon	Super Black Racing
2017	Supercars Championship	39th	Holden VF Commodore	Erebus Motorsport
2018	Dunlop Super2 Series	1st	Holden VF Commodore	Garry Rogers Motorsport
2018	Supercars Championship	35th	Holden ZB Commodore	Garry Rogers Motorsport
2019	CarSales TCR Australia Series	12th	Renault Mégane R.S TCR	Garry Rogers Motorsport
2019	Supercars Championship	33rd	Holden ZB Commodore	Garry Rogers Motorsport
2020	Supercars Championship	20th	Holden ZB Commodore	Team Sydney by Tekno
2021	Supercars Championship	37th	Holden ZB Commodore	Brad Jones Racing
2022	Supercars Championship	20th	Holden ZB Commodore	PremiAir Racing
2023	Porsche Carrera Cup Australia	21st	Porsche 911 GT3 Cup (992)	EMA Motorsport

=== Toyota Racing Series ===
Year	Entrant	1	2	3	4	5	6	7	8	9	10	11	12	13	14	15	16	17	Position	Points
2005	Chris Pither Motorsport	TIM; 1; 8	TIM; 2; 8	TIM; 3 Ret	TER; 1; 4	TER; 2; 3	TER; 3; 2	RUA; 1; 7	RUA; 2; 16	RUA; 3; 10	MAN; 1; 8	MAN; 2; 5	MAN; 3; 3	MAN; 1; 2	MAN; 2; 3	MAN; 3; 4	PUK; 1; 4	PUK; 2; 6	5th	782

=== Super2 Series results ===
Super2 Series results
Year	Team	No.	Car	1	2	3	4	5	6	7	8	9	10	11	12	13	14	15	16	17	18	Position	Points
2006	Partington Race Prep	41	Ford AU Falcon	ADE; R1; 13	ADE; R2; 9	WAK; R3; 7	WAK; R4; Ret	WAK; R5; DNS	QLD; R6; 11	QLD; R7; 4	QLD; R8; 26	ORA; R9; 21	ORA; R10; Ret	ORA; R11; DNS	MAL; R12; 21	MAL; R13; 3	MAL; R14; 10	BAT; R15; 14	BAT; R16; 12	PHI; R17; 16	PHI; R18; 13	11th	1131
2007	Sydney Star Racing	96	Holden VZ Commodore	ADE; R1	ADE; R2	WAK; R3	WAK; R4	WAK; R5	WIN; R6; 6	WIN; R7; 27	WIN; R8; 15											14th	80
2007	Kanga Loaders Racing	44	Holden VY Commodore									QLD; R9; 20	QLD; R10; 12	QLD; R11; 12	ORA; R12; 10	ORA; R13; 12	ORA; R14; Ret	BAT; R15; 14	BAT; R16; Ret	PHI; R17; 7	PHI; R18; 4	14th	80
2013	Brad Jones Racing	42	Holden VE Commodore	ADE; R1; 18	ADE; R2; Ret	BAR; R3; 12	BAR; R4; 14	BAR; R5; 17	TOW; R6; 12	TOW; R7; 11	TOW; R8; DSQ	QLD; R9; 11	QLD; R10; 17	QLD; R11; 9	WIN; R12; 26	WIN; R13; 19	WIN; R14; 14	BAT; R15; 21	BAT; R16; 10	SYD; R17; 6	SYD; R18; 5	15th	787
2014	Brad Jones Racing	42	Holden VE Commodore	ADE; R1; 5	ADE; R2; 8	WIN; R3; 11	WIN; R4; 7	BAR; R5; 4	BAR; R6; 7	TOW; R7; 1	TOW; R8; 5	QLD; R9; Ret	QLD; R10; 15	BAT; R11; 3	SYD; R12; 4	SYD; R13; 6						4th	1361
2015	MW Motorsport	42	Ford FG Falcon	ADE; R1; 3	ADE; R2; 12	BAR; R3; 2	BAR; R4; 2	BAR; R5; 22	WIN; R6; 6	WIN; R7; 5	WIN; R8; 4	TOW; R9; 11	TOW; R10; 3	QLD; R11; 5	QLD; R12; 5	QLD; R13; 1	BAT; R14; 3	SYD; R15	SYD; R16			5th	1337
2018	Garry Rogers Motorsport	44	Holden VF Commodore	ADE; R1; 6	ADE; R2; 7	ADE; R3; 7	SYM; R4; 2	SYM; R5; 1	SYM; R6; 2	BAR; R7; 7	BAR; R8; 4	BAR; R9; 7	TOW; R10; 6	TOW; R11; 1	SAN; R12; 16	SAN; R13; 3	BAT; R14; 3	NEW; R15; 2	NEW; R16; C			1st	1522

=== Supercars Championship results ===
Supercars results
Year	Team	No.	Car	1	2	3	4	5	6	7	8	9	10	11	12	13	14	15	16	17	18	19	20	21	22	23	24	25	26	27	28	29	30	31	32	33	34	35	36	37	38	39	Position	Points
2006	Team Kiwi Racing	021	Holden VZ Commodore	ADE; R1	ADE; R2	PUK; R3	PUK; R4	PUK; R5	BAR; R6	BAR; R7	BAR; R8	WIN; R9	WIN; R10	WIN; R11	HDV; R12	HDV; R13	HDV; R14	QLD; R15	QLD; R16	QLD; R17	ORA; R18	ORA; R19	ORA; R20	SAN; R21	BAT; R22	SUR; R23	SUR; R24	SUR; R25	SYM; R26	SYM; R27	SYM; R28	BHR; R29; 25	BHR; R30; 22	BHR; R31; 23	PHI; R32	PHI; R33	PHI; R34						61st	97
2007	Paul Morris Motorsport	39	Holden VZ Commodore	ADE; R1	ADE; R2	BAR; R3	BAR; R4	BAR; R5	PUK; R6	PUK; R7	PUK; R8	WIN; R9	WIN; R10	WIN; R11	EAS; R12	EAS; R13	EAS; R14	HDV; R15	HDV; R16	HDV; R17	QLD; R18	QLD; R19	QLD; R20	ORA; R21	ORA; R22	ORA; R23	SAN; R24; 19	BAT; R25; 16	SUR; R26	SUR; R27	SUR; R28	BHR; R29	BHR; R30	BHR; R31	SYM; R32	SYM; R33	SYM; R34	PHI; R35	PHI; R36	PHI; R37			56th	0
2008	Team Kiwi Racing	021	Ford BF Falcon	ADE; R1	ADE; R2	EAS; R3; 28	EAS; R4; 25	EAS; R5; 23	HAM; R6	HAM; R7	HAM; R8	BAR; R9	BAR; R10	BAR; R11	SAN; R12	SAN; R13	SAN; R14	HDV; R15	HDV; R16	HDV; R17	QLD; R18	QLD; R19	QLD; R20	WIN; R21; 28	WIN; R22; 19	WIN; R23; 22	PHI; Q DNQ	PHI; R24; DNQ	BAT; R25; Ret	SUR; R26	SUR; R27	SUR; R28	BHR; R29	BHR; R30	BHR; R31	SYM; R32	SYM; R33	SYM; R34	ORA; R35	ORA; R36	ORA; R37		50th	130
2012	Britek Motorsport	21	Holden VE Commodore	ADE; R1	ADE; R2	SYM; R3	SYM; R4	HAM; R5	HAM; R6	BAR; R7	BAR; R8	BAR; R9	PHI; R10; PO	PHI; R11; PO	HID; R12	HID; R13	TOW; R14	TOW; R15	QLD; R16; PO	QLD; R17; PO	SMP; R18	SMP; R19	SAN; Q 18	SAN; R20; 22	BAT; R21; 14	SUR; R22	SUR; R23	YMC; R24	YMC; R25	YMC; R26	WIN; R27	WIN; R28	SYD; R29	SYD; R30									44th	210
2013	Britek Motorsport	21	Holden VF Commodore	ADE; R1	ADE; R2	SYM; R3	SYM; R4	SYM; R5	PUK; R6	PUK; R7	PUK; R8	PUK; R9	BAR; R10	BAR; R11	BAR; R12	COA; R13	COA; R14	COA; R15	COA; R16	HID; R17	HID; R18	HID; R19	TOW; R20	TOW; R21	QLD; R22	QLD; R23	QLD; R24	WIN; R25	WIN; R26	WIN; R27	SAN; Q 16	SAN; R28; 19	BAT; R29; 22	SUR; R30; 7	SUR; R31; 12	PHI; R32	PHI; R33	PHI; R34	SYD; R35	SYD; R36			47th	339
2014	Britek Motorsport	21	Holden VF Commodore	ADE; R1	ADE; R2	ADE; R3	SYM; R4	SYM; R5	SYM; R6	WIN; R7	WIN; R8	WIN; R9	PUK; R10	PUK; R11	PUK; R12	PUK; R13	BAR; R14	BAR; R15	BAR; R16	HID; R17	HID; R18	HID; R19	TOW; R20	TOW; R21	TOW; R22	QLD; R23	QLD; R24	QLD; R25	SMP; R26	SMP; R27	SMP; R28	SAN; Q Ret	SAN; R29; 19	BAT; R30; Ret	SUR; R31; 14	SUR; R32; Ret	PHI; R33	PHI; R34	PHI; R35	SYD; R36	SYD; R37	SYD; R38	49th	159
2015	Garry Rogers Motorsport	34	Volvo S60	ADE; R1	ADE; R2	ADE; R3	SYM; R4	SYM; R5	SYM; R6	BAR; R7	BAR; R8	BAR; R9	WIN; R10	WIN; R11	WIN; R12	HID; R13	HID; R14	HID; R15	TOW; R16	TOW; R17	QLD; R18	QLD; R19	QLD; R20	SMP; R21	SMP; R22	SMP; R23	SAN; Q 23	SAN; R24; 21	BAT; R25; Ret	SUR; R26; 16	SUR; R27; Ret	PUK; R28	PUK; R29	PUK; R30									48th	264
2015	Super Black Racing	111	Ford FG X Falcon																																PHI; R31; 24	PHI; R32; 24	PHI; R33; 19	SYD; R34; 23	SYD; R35; 18	SYD; R36; Ret			48th	264
2016	Super Black Racing	111	Ford FG X Falcon	ADE; R1; 18	ADE; R2; Ret	ADE; R3; DNS	SYM; R4; 17	SYM; R5; Ret	PHI; R6; 19	PHI; R7; 24	BAR; R8; 8	BAR; R9; 14	WIN; R10; 18	WIN; R11; 18	HID; R12; 14	HID; R13; 11	TOW; R14; 20	TOW; R15; 22	QLD; R16; 11	QLD; R17; 8	SMP; R18; 14	SMP; R19; 13	SAN; Q 24	SAN; R20; 17	BAT; R21; 12	SUR; R22; 10	SUR; R23; Ret	PUK; R24; 24	PUK; R25; 24	PUK; R26; 23	PUK; R27; 22	SYD; R28; Ret	SYD; R29; 18										21st	1369
2017	Erebus Motorsport	99	Holden VF Commodore	ADE; R1	ADE; R2	SYM; R3	SYM; R4	PHI; R5	PHI; R6	BAR; R7	BAR; R8	WIN; R9; PO	WIN; R10; PO	HID; R11	HID; R12	TOW; R13	TOW; R14	QLD; R15; PO	QLD; R16; PO	SMP; R17	SMP; R18	SAN; QR; 9	SAN; R19; 13	BAT; R20; 4	SUR; R21; 22	SUR; R22; 18	PUK; R23	PUK; R24	NEW; R25	NEW; R26													39th	462
2018	Garry Rogers Motorsport	33	Holden ZB Commodore	ADE; R1	ADE; R2	MEL; R3	MEL; R4	MEL; R5	MEL; R6	SYM; R7	SYM; R8	PHI; R9	PHI; R10	BAR; R11	BAR; R12	WIN; R13; PO	WIN; R14; PO	HID; R15	HID; R16	TOW; R17	TOW; R18	QLD; R19; PO	QLD; R20; PO	SMP; R21	BEN; R22	BEN; R23	SAN; QR; 19	SAN; R24; 9	BAT; R25; 6	SUR; R26; 9	SUR; R27; C	PUK; R28	PUK; R29	NEW; R30	NEW; R31								35th	456
2019	Garry Rogers Motorsport	33	Holden ZB Commodore	ADE; R1	ADE; R2<	MEL; R3	MEL; R4	MEL; R5	MEL; R6	SYM; R7	SYM; R8	PHI; R9	PHI; R10	BAR; R11	BAR; R12	WIN; R13; PO	WIN; R14; 14	HID; R15; 15	HID; R16; 23	TOW; R17	TOW; R18	QLD; R19	QLD; R20	BEN; R21	BEN; R22	PUK; R23	PUK; R24	BAT; R25; 12	SUR; R26; 23	SUR; R27; 18	SAN; QR; 17	SAN; R28; 14	NEW; R29	NEW; R30									33rd	507
2020	Team Sydney by Tekno	22	Holden ZB Commodore	ADE; R1; 19	ADE; R2; Ret	MEL; R3; C	MEL; R4; C	MEL; R5; C	MEL; R6; C	SMP1; R7; 20	SMP1; R8; 22	SMP1; R9; 23	SMP2; R10; 21	SMP2; R11; 18	SMP2; R12; 22	HID1; R13; 5	HID1; R14; 21	HID1; R15; 21	HID2; R16; Ret	HID2; R17; 20	HID2; R18; 19	TOW1; R19; 11	TOW1; R20; 24	TOW1; R21; 23	TOW2; R22; 21	TOW2; R23; 21	TOW2; R24; Ret	BEN1; R25; 21	BEN1; R26; 19	BEN1; R27; 15	BEN2; R28; 20	BEN2; R29; 15	BEN2; R30; 23	BAT; R31; 16									20th	866
2021	Brad Jones Racing	96	Commodore ZB	BAT1; R1	BAT1; R2	SAN; R3	SAN; R4	SAN; R5	SYM; R6	SYM; R7	SYM; R8	BEN; R9	BEN; R10	BEN; R11	HID; R12	HID; R13	HID; R14	TOW1; R15	TOW1; R16	TOW2; R17	TOW2; R18	TOW2; R19	SMP1; R20	SMP1; R21	SMP1; R22	SMP2; R23	SMP2; R24	SMP2; R25	SMP3; R26	SMP3; R27	SMP3; R28	SMP4; R29; PO	SMP4; R30; PO	BAT2; R31; 12									37th	138
2022	PremiAir Racing	22	Holden ZB Commodore	SMP; R1; 23	SMP; R2; 20	SYM; R3; 20	SYM; R4; 13	SYM; R5; 16	MEL; R6; 24	MEL; R7; 16	MEL; R8; 19	MEL; R9; 21	BAR; R10; 24	BAR; R11; 15	BAR; R12; 17	WIN; R13; 26	WIN; R14; 24	WIN; R15; 22	HID; R16; 23	HID; R17; 22	HID; R18; 20	TOW; R19; 19	TOW; R20; 18	BEN; R21; 24	BEN; R22; 12	BEN; R23; 18	SAN; R24; 25	SAN; R25; 16	SAN; R26; 21	PUK; R27; 13	PUK; R28; 19	PUK; R29; 16	BAT; R30; 21	SUR; R31; 16	SUR; R32; 9	ADE; R33; 19	ADE; R34; 16						20th	1257

=== Bathurst 1000 results ===
Year	Team	Car	Co-driver	Position	Laps
2007	Paul Morris Motorsport	Holden Commodore VZ	(New Zealand) Fabian Coulthard	16th	159
2008	Team Kiwi Racing	Ford Falcon BF	(New Zealand) Kayne Scott	DNF	8
2012	Britek Motorsport	Holden Commodore VE	(Australia) David Wall	14th	161
2013	Britek Motorsport	Holden Commodore VF	(Australia) David Wall	22nd	156
2014	Britek Motorsport	Holden Commodore VF	(Australia) Dale Wood	DNF	45
2015	Garry Rogers Motorsport	Volvo S60	(Australia) David Wall	DNF	15
2016	Super Black Racing	Ford Falcon FG X	(New Zealand) Richie Stanaway	12th	161
2017	Erebus Motorsport	Holden Commodore VF	(Australia) Dale Wood	4th	161
2018	Garry Rogers Motorsport	Holden Commodore ZB	(Australia) Garth Tander	6th	161
2019	Garry Rogers Motorsport	Holden Commodore ZB	(New Zealand) Richie Stanaway	12th	161
2020	Team Sydney by Tekno	Holden Commodore ZB	(Australia) Steve Owen	16th	159
2021	Brad Jones Racing	Holden Commodore ZB	(Australia) Macauley Jones	12th	161
2022	PremiAir Racing	Holden Commodore ZB	(Australia) Cameron Hill	21st	153

Sporting positions
Preceded by Grant Johnson	V8 Ute Racing Series; Champion; 2011	Succeeded by Ryal Harris
Preceded by Todd Hazelwood	Dunlop Super2 Series; Champion; 2018	Succeeded by Bryce Fullwood
