= André Heimgartner =

New Zealand racing driver

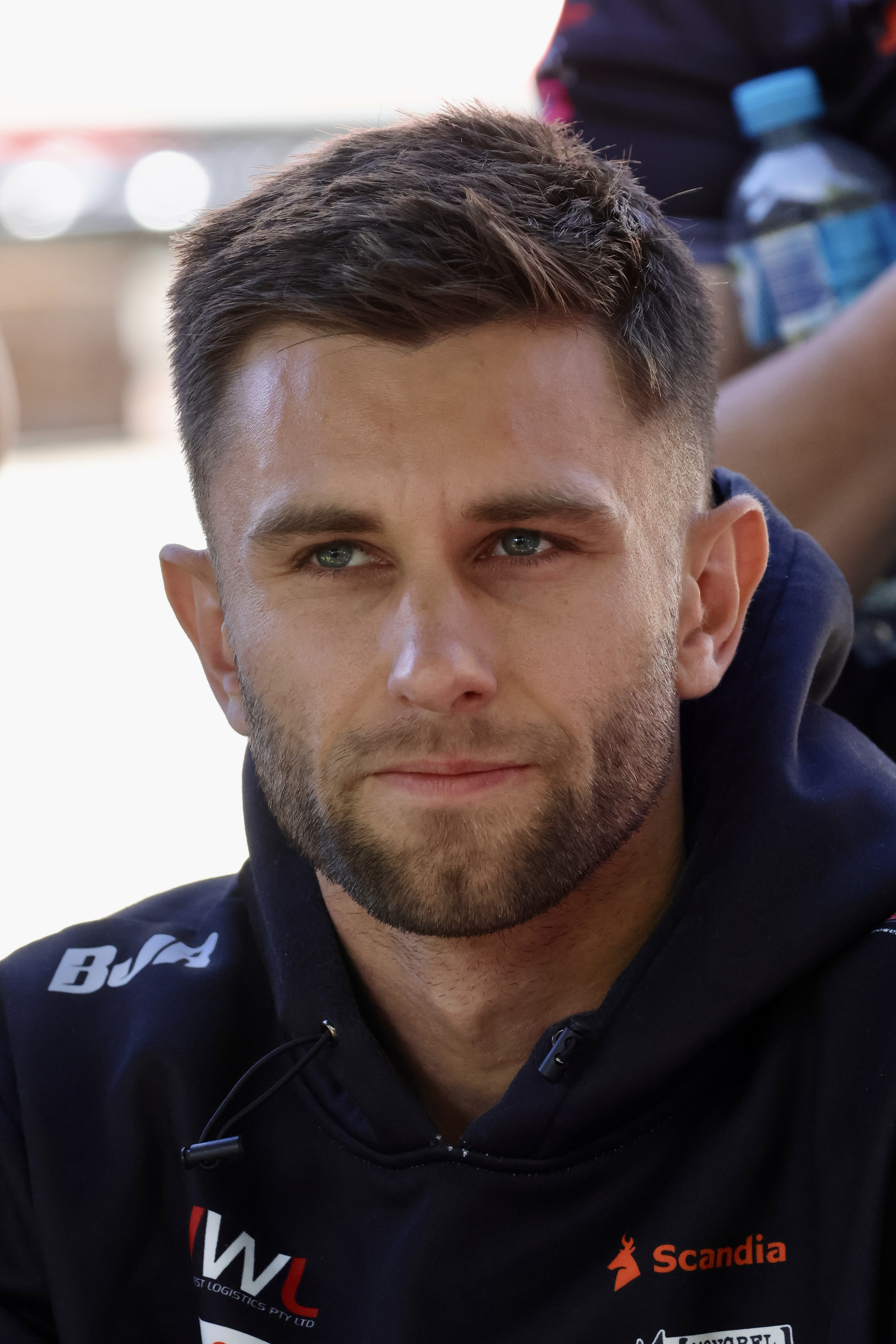
- André Heimgartner in 2025
- Nationality: New Zealander
- Born: André Emil Heimgartner; 8 June 1995 (age 31) Auckland, New Zealand
- Categorisation: FIA Silver (until 2023); FIA Gold (2024–)

Previous series
- 2010-12 2011 2009-13 2017-18: Formula Ford New Zealand; Formula Ford Australia; V8SuperTourer; NZ Touring Cars Championship

Championship titles
- 2010–11 2011–12 2017–18: Formula Ford New Zealand; Formula Ford New Zealand; NZ Touring Cars Championship

Awards
- 2012 2015: Australian Porsche scholarship to Europe; Bruce McLaren Trophy

Supercars Championship career
- Current team: Brad Jones Racing
- Championships: 0
- Races: 327
- Wins: 3
- Podiums: 19
- Pole positions: 4
- 2023 position: 7th (2016 pts)

André Emil Heimgartner (born 8 June 1995) is a New Zealand motor-racing driver who currently competes in the Repco Supercars Championship driving the No. 8 Toyota GR Supra for Brad Jones Racing.

== Career ==
=== Formula racing ===
At 12 years of age, Heimgartner raced in the NZ Formula Vee championship. He became the youngest driver in the world to win a Formula Ford Championship at the age of fifteen when he won the New Zealand Formula Ford Championship during the 2010–11 season. He returned to successfully defend his title for the 2011–12 season whilst contesting selected events in the 2011 Australian Formula Ford Championship. In 2013, he ran in select races in Australian Formula 3.

=== Touring cars ===
==== New Zealand ====
In 2012, Heimgartner entered the inaugural season of the New Zealand-based V8SuperTourer series, driving a Holden VE Commodore run by AV8 Motorsport. He finished the sprint championship in tenth place overall, achieving a best result of fourth place at Hampton Downs Motorsport Park; and seventh place in the endurance championship, with his best finish being fifth place in the Fathers' Day 400 at Taupo Motorsport Park. He was classified eleventh overall at the end of the season.

Heimgartner then moved from AV8 Motorsport to the Melbourne Performance Centre and then Motorsport Networks teams during a four-season period. He went on to become the only driver to compete in every race of the championship over the four-year period. He achieved 15 podium finishes during that period.

==== Australia ====
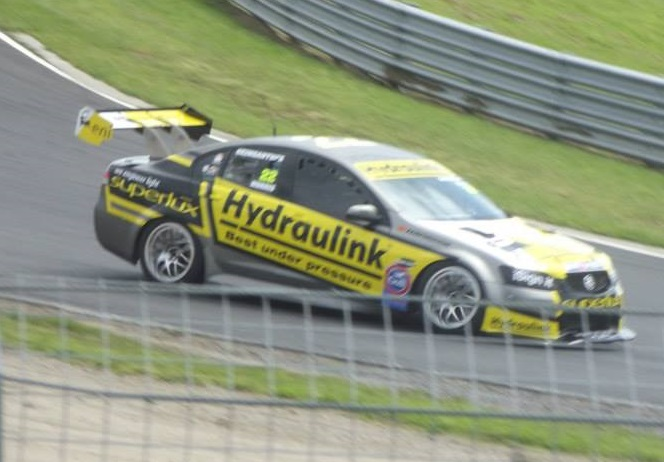
Heimgartner finished seventh in the 2013 V8SuperTourers Championship driving a Holden VE Commodore

Parallel to his appearances in the V8Supertourer category in 2012, Heimgartner contested the Australia-based Porsche Carrera Cup series at the age of 16. André ran as high as fourth for much of the season before a no fault contact by a competitor caused a DNF. 2013 Dunlop V8 Supercar Series, driving an ex-Dick Johnson Racing Ford FG Falcon entered by Finance EZI Racing, which entered Heimgartner alongside Josh Hunter as the team's drivers. In 2014, he drove for Matt White in the supercar Dunlop series with three podium finishes.

2013 also saw Heimgartner's first drive in a V8 Supercars Holden Commodore VF. Due to his close association with Paul Morris he got to do co-driver laps in Dean Fiore's No. 88 Lucas Dumbrell Motorsport entry at Queensland Raceway replacing Matt Halliday in the dedicated co-driver session.

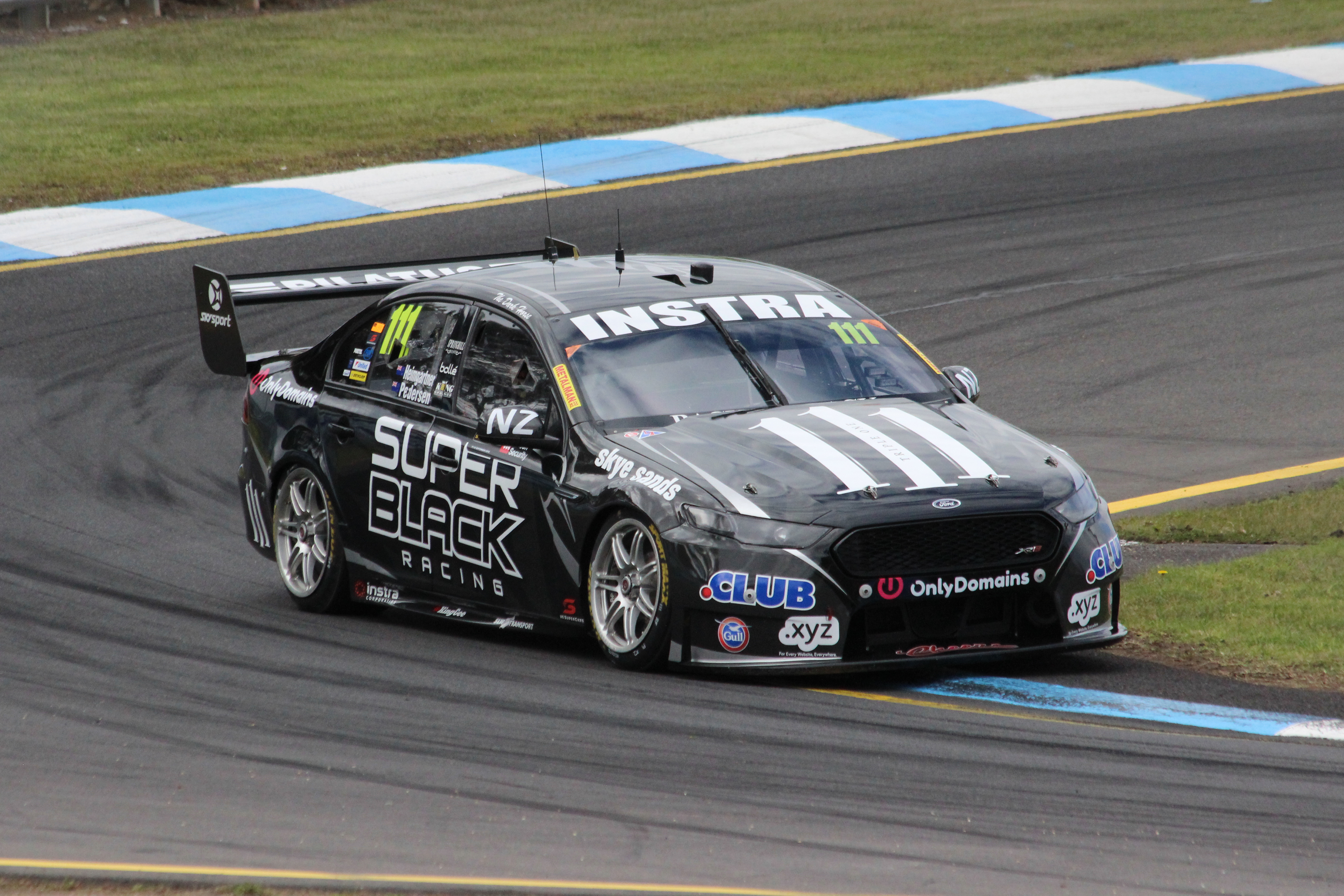
Heimgartner contested the 2015 V8 Supercars Championship for Super Black Racing in a Ford Falcon

In 2014, Heimgartner was selected to race the Super Black Racing wildcard entry at the 2014 Supercheap Auto Bathurst 1000 alongside fellow Kiwi Ant Pedersen. Following this performance the team retained him in the teams' full-time category début the following season. 2015 was a formative year for the new Superblack team and was plagued by performance inconsistencies. A best qualifying position of third and numerous top-ten finishes for the 2015 season. Heimgartner's second year in Supercars and severe budget constraints lead to relocation to the minnow LDM team, car performance and reliability issues produced disappointing results.

=== Endurance racing ===
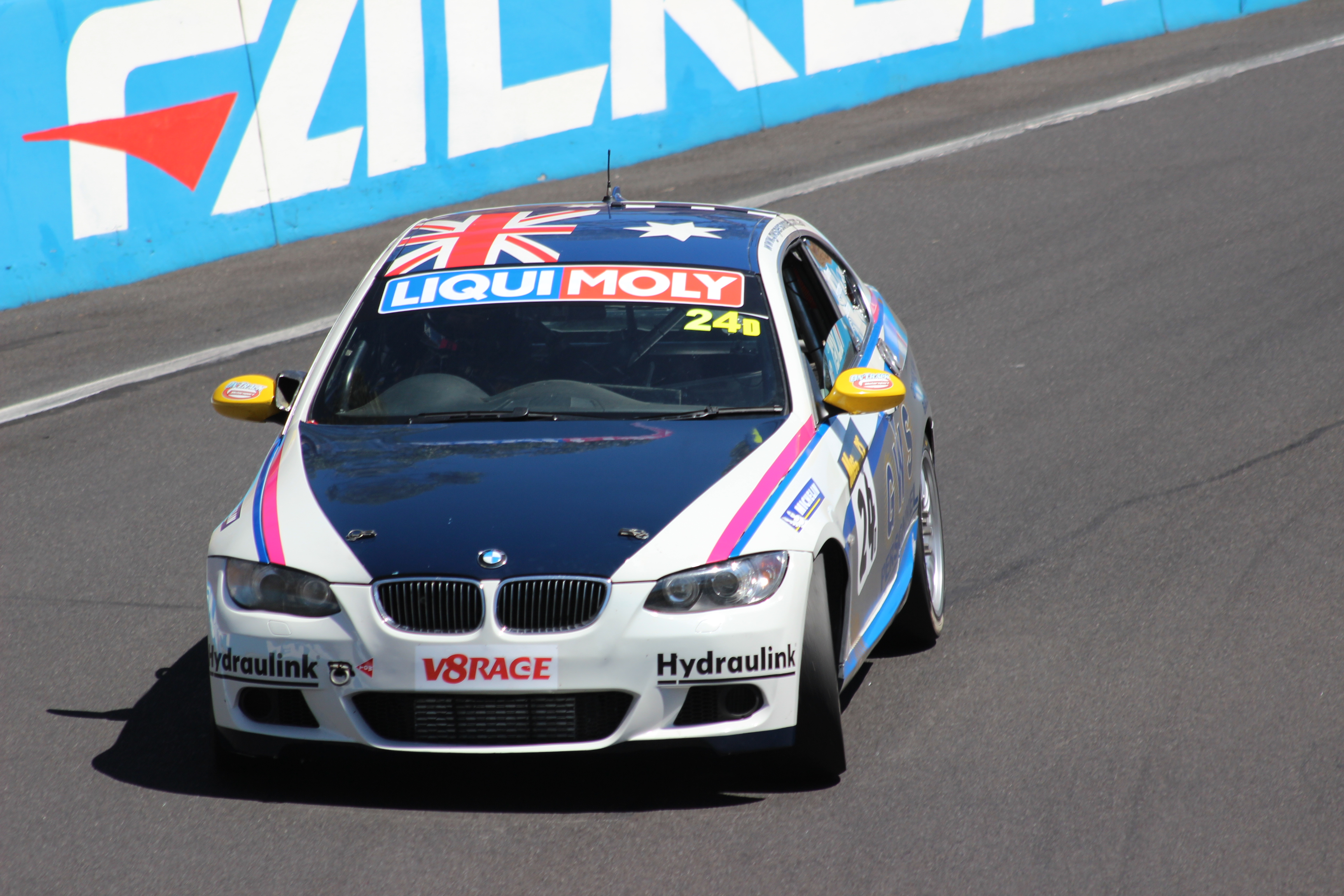
Heimgartner at the 2013 Bathurst 12 Hour

In 2013, Heimgartner contested the Bathurst 12 Hour event at the Mount Panorama Circuit in Bathurst, New South Wales. Sharing a BMW 335i with co-drivers Anthony Gilbertson and Peter O'Donnell, Heimgartner finished the race first in his class. In New Zealand, Heimgartner, as a 14-year-old, won the Mini Challenge 3-hour endurance classic. As a 16-year-old driving ab RSR Porsche while leading the field by 15 laps, he suffered a terminal mechanical issue ten minutes from the chequered flag. Achieved various successes in endurance competition driving GT3 Porsches for Fastway and Hood. He competed in two seasons of V8 Supertourer endurance competition with Paul Morris as co-driver.

By February 2018, Heimgartner had completed four consecutive Bathurst 1000 endurance events with a best placing of 9th.

== Personal life ==
Heimgartner is currently engaged to Jewelry Designer Jemma Boskovich. He was in a relationship with Renee Gracie between 2014 and 2017. The Kiwi is now living in Perth, Western Australia.

== Racing record ==
=== Career results ===
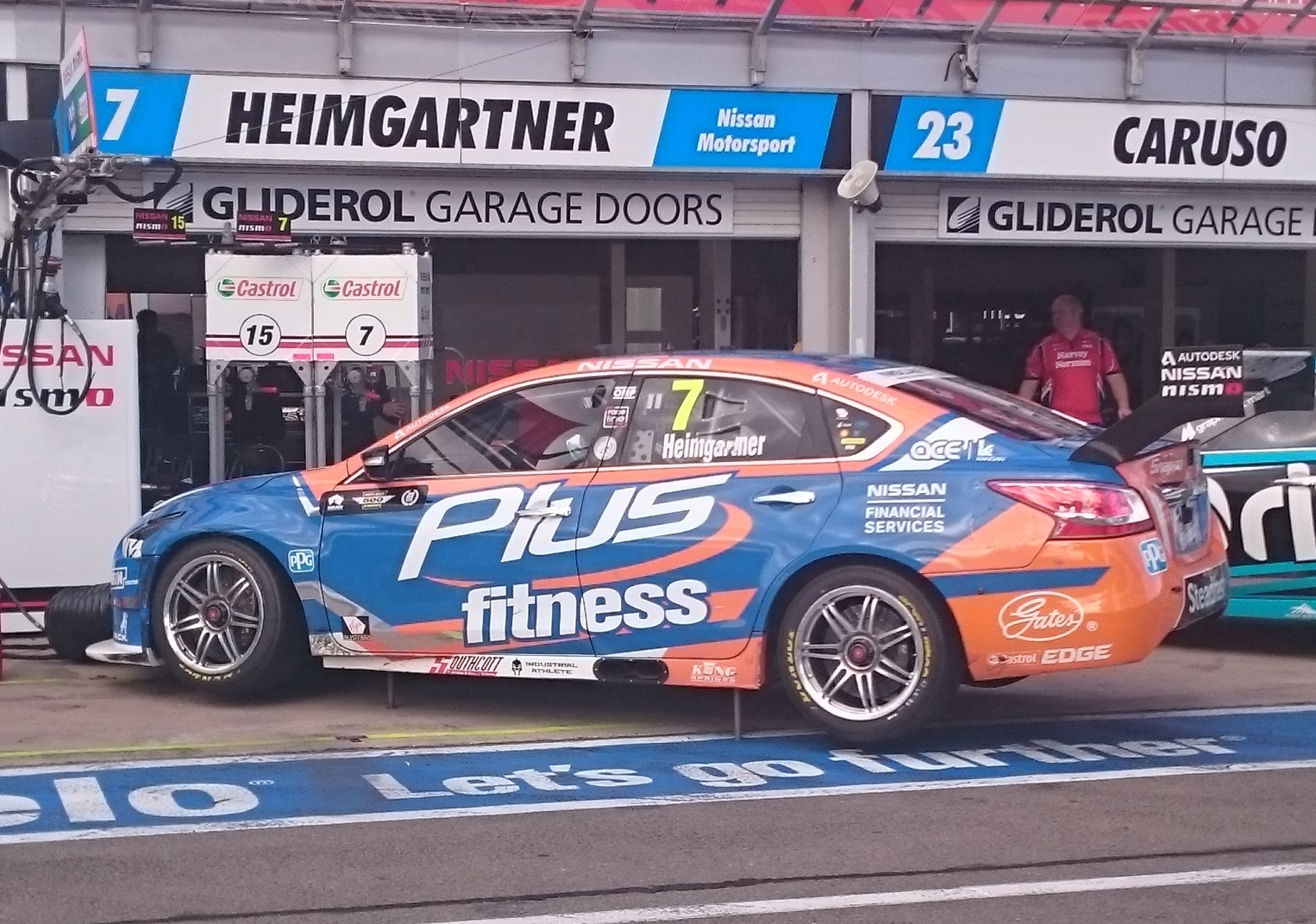
Heimgartner contested the 2018 Virgin Australia Supercars Championship with Nissan Motorsport in a Nissan Altima

Season	Series	Position	Car	Team
2008–09	New Zealand Formula First Series	13th	Sabre	
2009–10	New Zealand Formula Ford Championship	6th	Stealth Van Diemen	
2010–11	New Zealand Formula Ford Championship	1st	Mygale 10	Motorsport Solutions
2011	Australian Formula Ford Championship	24th	Mygale SJ08A Ford	Team BRM
2011–12	New Zealand Formula Ford Championship	1st	Mygale SJ10	Motorsport Solutions
2012	Australian Carrera Cup Championship	7th	Porsche 997 GT3 Cup	Team Kiwi Racing
2012	V8 SuperTourers Championship	10th	Holden VE Commodore	AV8 Motorsport
2013	Australian Drivers' Championship	14th	Mygale M08 Mercedes-Benz	Erebus Academy Formula 3
2013	V8 SuperTourers Championship	7th	Holden VE Commodore	MPC Motorsport
2013	Dunlop V8 Supercar Series	20th	Ford FG Falcon	Finance EZI Racing
2014	International V8 Supercars Championship	50th	Ford FG Falcon	Super Black Racing
2014	Dunlop V8 Supercar Series	5th	Ford FG Falcon	Finance EZI Racing
2015	International V8 Supercars Championship	24th	Ford FG Falcon; Ford FG X Falcon	Super Black Racing
2016	International V8 Supercars Championship	25th	Holden VF Commodore	Lucas Dumbrell Motorsport
2017	Virgin Australia Supercars Championship	46th	Holden VF Commodore	Brad Jones Racing
2017–18	New Zealand Touring Cars - Class one	1st	Toyota Camry	Richards Team Motorsport
2018	Virgin Australia Supercars Championship	17th	Nissan Altima L33	Nissan Motorsport
2019	Virgin Australia Supercars Championship	16th	Nissan Altima L33	Kelly Racing
2019	CarSales TCR Australia Series	13th	Subaru WRX STI TCR; Holden Astra TCR	Kelly Racing
2020	Virgin Australia Supercars Championship	14th	Ford Mustang GT	Kelly Racing
2021	Repco Supercars Championship	12th	Ford Mustang GT	Kelly Grove Racing
2022	Repco Supercars Championship	10th	Holden ZB Commodore	Brad Jones Racing
2023	Repco Supercars Championship	7th	Chevrolet Camaro ZL1	Brad Jones Racing

=== Super2 Series results ===
Super2 Series results
Year	Team	No.	Car	1	2	3	4	5	6	7	8	9	10	11	12	13	14	15	16	17	18	Position	Points
2013	Finance EZI Racing	64	Ford FG Falcon	ADE; R1; 15	ADE; R2; 11	BAR; R3; 27	BAR; R4; 18	BAR; R5; 24	TOW; R6; 23	TOW; R7; 17	TOW; R8; DSQ	QLD; R9; 10	QLD; R10; 1	QLD; R11; 22	WIN; R12; Ret	WIN; R13; 21	WIN; R14; 17	BAT; R15; 17	BAT; R16; 12	SYD; R17; 24	SYD; R18; 16	20th	677
2014	MW Motorsport	26	Ford FG Falcon	ADE; R1; 6	ADE; R2; 7	WIN; R3; 9	WIN; R4; 10	BAR; R5; 9	BAR; R6; 1	TOW; R7; 3	TOW; R8; 3	QLD; R9; Ret	QLD; R10; 12	BAT; R11; 7	SYD; R12; 5	SYD; R13; 8						5th	1314

=== Supercars Championship results ===
Supercars results
Year	Team	Car	1	2	3	4	5	6	7	8	9	10	11	12	13	14	15	16	17	18	19	20	21	22	23	24	25	26	27	28	29	30	31	32	33	34	35	36	37	38	Position	Points
2014	Super Black Racing	Ford FG Falcon	ADE; R1	ADE; R2	ADE; R3	SYM; R4	SYM; R5	SYM; R6	WIN; R7	WIN; R8	WIN; R9	PUK; R10	PUK; R11	PUK; R12	PUK; R13	BAR; R14	BAR; R15	BAR; R16	HID; R17	HID; R18	HID; R19	TOW; R20	TOW; R21	TOW; R22	QLD; R23	QLD; R24	QLD; R25	SMP; R26	SMP; R27	SMP; R28	SAN; R29	BAT; R30; 11	SUR; R31	SUR; R32	PHI; R33	PHI; R34	PHI; R35	SYD; R36	SYD; R37	SYD; R38	50th	144
2015	Super Black Racing	Ford FG Falcon	ADE; R1; 23	ADE; R2; 20	ADE; R3; 21																																				24th	1068
2015	Super Black Racing	Ford FG X Falcon				SYM; R4; 11	SYM; R5; 25	SYM; R6; 8	BAR; R7; 21	BAR; R8; 16	BAR; R9; Ret	WIN; R10; 20	WIN; R11; 20	WIN; R12; 17	HID; R13; 22	HID; R14; Ret	HID; R15; 19	TOW; R16; 23	TOW; R17; 8	QLD; R18; 14	QLD; R19; 17	QLD; R20; 16	SMP; R21; 7	SMP; R22; 13	SMP; R23; 19	SAN; QR; 25	SAN; R24; 17	BAT; R25; Ret	SUR; R26; 18	SUR; R27; 18	PUK; R28; 19	PUK; R29; 18	PUK; R30; 21	PHI; R31	PHI; R32	PHI; R33	SYD; R34	SYD; R35	SYD; R36		24th	1068
2016	Lucas Dumbrell Motorsport	Holden VF Commodore	ADE; R1; 22	ADE; R2; 20	ADE; R3; 19	SYM; R4; 25	SYM; R5; Ret	PHI; R6; 24	PHI; R7; 21	BAR; R8; 21	BAR; R9; 25	WIN; R10; 23	WIN; R11; 21	HID; R12; 18	HID; R13; 12	TOW; R14; 15	TOW; R15; Ret	QLD; R16; 19	QLD; R17; 15	SMP; R18; 23	SMP; R19; 24	SAN; QR; 16	SAN; R20; 19	BAT; R21; Ret	SUR; R22; 13	SUR; R23; Ret	PUK; R24; 22	PUK; R25; 22	PUK; R26; 22	PUK; R27; Ret	SYD; R28; 20	SYD; R29; 20									25th	1010
2017	Brad Jones Racing	Holden VF Commodore	ADE; R1	ADE; R2	SYM; R3	SYM; R4	PHI; R5	PHI; R6	BAR; R7	BAR; R8	WIN; R9	WIN; R10	HID; R11	HID; R12	TOW; R13	TOW; R14	QLD; R15	QLD; R16	SMP; R17	SMP; R18	SAN; QR	SAN; R19	BAT; R20; 9	SUR; R21; 3	SUR; R22; 22	PUK; R23	PUK; R24	NEW; R25	NEW; R26												46th	336
2018	Nissan Motorsport	Nissan Altima L33	ADE; R1; 17	ADE; R2; 25	MEL; R3; 18	MEL; R4; 16	MEL; R5; 21	MEL; R6; 14	SYM; R7; 17	SYM; R8; 19	PHI; R9; 15	PHI; R10; 14	BAR; R11; 25	BAR; R12; 8	WIN; R13; 16	WIN; R14; 11	HID; R15; 16	HID; R16; 16	TOW; R17; 12	TOW; R18; 11	QLD; R19; 15	QLD; R20; 14	SMP; R21; 24	BEN; R22; 19	BEN; R23; Ret	SAN; QR; 6	SAN; R24; 14	BAT; R25; 16	SUR; R26; 19	SUR; R27; C	PUK; R28; 18	PUK; R29; 8	NEW; R30; 8	NEW; R31; 6							17th	1775
2019	Nissan Motorsport	Nissan Altima L33	ADE; R1; 13	ADE; R2; 13	MEL; R3; 15	MEL; R4; 18	MEL; R5; 9	MEL; R6; 14	SYM; R7; 18	SYM; R8; 17	PHI; R9; 3	PHI; R10; 13	BAR; R11; 17	BAR; R12; 23	WIN; R13; 8	WIN; R14; 11	HID; R15; 16	HID; R16; 11	TOW; R17; 12	TOW; R18; 18	QLD; R19; 12	QLD; R20; 7	BEN; R21; 5	BEN; R22; 20	PUK; R23; 8	PUK; R24; 19	BAT; R25; Ret	SUR; R26; Ret	SUR; R27; 21	SAN; QR; 2	SAN; R28; 8	NEW; R29; 21	NEW; R30; 12								16th	1875
2020	Kelly Racing	Ford Mustang S550	ADE; R1; 11	ADE; R2; 10	MEL; R3; C	MEL; R4; C	MEL; R5; C	MEL; R6; C	SMP1; R7; 15	SMP1; R8; 10	SMP1; R9; 15	SMP2; R10; 17	SMP2; R11; 12	SMP2; R12; 2	HID1; R13; 9	HID1; R14; 10	HID1; R15; 16	HID2; R16; 15	HID2; R17; 10	HID2; R18; 8	TOW1; R19; Ret	TOW1; R20; 14	TOW1; R21; 15	TOW2; R22; 18	TOW2; R23; 24	TOW2; R24; 17	BEN1; R25; 4	BEN1; R26; 2	BEN1; R27; 7	BEN2; R28; 14	BEN2; R29; 10	BEN2; R30; 14	BAT; R31; 11								14th	1444
2021	Kelly Grove Racing	Ford Mustang S550	BAT1; R1; 15	BAT2; R2; 9	SAN; R3; 8	SAN; R4; 5	SAN; R5; 11	SYM; R6; 22	SYM; R7; 10	SYM; R8; 22	BEN; R9; 1	BEN; R10; 7	BEN; R11; 10	HID; R12; 15	HID; R13; 17	HID; R14; Ret	TOW1; R15; 12	TOW1; R16; 12	TOW2; R17; 19	TOW2; R18; 20	TOW2; R19; 15	SMP1; R20; 15	SMP1; R21; 8	SMP1; R22; 13	SMP2; R23; Ret	SMP2; R24; 7	SMP2; R25; 10	SMP3; R26; 10	SMP3; R27; 16	SMP3; R29; 24	SMP4; R29; 15	SMP4; R30; C	BAT2; R31; NC								17th	1394
2022	Brad Jones Racing	Holden ZB Commodore	SMP; R1; 14	SMP; R2; 5	SYM; R3; 8	SYM; R4; Ret	SYM; R5; 24	MEL; R6; 14	MEL; R7; Ret	MEL; R8; 18	MEL; R9; 17	BAR; R10; 10	BAR; R11; 3	BAR; R12; 9	WIN; R13; 9	WIN; R14; 7	WIN; R15; 3	HID; R16; 4	HID; R17; 9	HID; R18; 5	TOW; R19; 4	TOW; R20; 9	BEN; R21; 10	BEN; R22; Ret	BEN; R23; DNS	SAN; R24; 23	SAN; R25; 6	SAN; R26; 13	PUK; R27; 2	PUK; R28; 6	PUK; R29; 3	BAT; R30; Ret	SUR; R31; Ret	SUR; R32; 8	ADE; R33; 9	ADE; R34; 5					10th	1877
2023	Brad Jones Racing	Chevrolet Camaro ZL1	NEW; R1; 5	NEW; R2; 7	MEL; R3; 17	MEL; R4; 16	MEL; R5; 5	MEL; R6; 2	BAR; R7; 21	BAR; R8; 10	BAR; R9; 22	SYM; R10; 2	SYM; R11; 12	SYM; R12; 17	HID; R13; 16	HID; R14; 3	HID; R15; 2	TOW; R16; 7	TOW; R17; 3	SMP; R18; 14	SMP; R19; 2	BEN; R20; 10	BEN; R21; 10	BEN; R22; 12	SAN; R23; 5	BAT; R24; Ret	SUR; R25; 7	SUR; R26; 17	ADE; R27; 9	ADE; R28; 6											7th	2016
2024	Brad Jones Racing	Chevrolet Camaro ZL1	BAT1; R1; 9	BAT1; R2; 18	MEL; R3; 18	MEL; R4; 14	MEL; R5; 20	MEL; R6; 17	TAU; R7; 1	TAU; R8; 6	BAR; R9; 13	BAR; R10; 15	HID; R11; 8	HID; R12; 21	TOW; R13; 9	TOW; R14; 11	SMP; R15; 12	SMP; R16; 19	SYM; R17; 22	SYM; R18; 6	SAN; R19; 11	BAT; R20; 16	SUR; R21; 8	SUR; R22; 6	ADE; R23; 7	ADE; R24; 9															10th	1794
2025	Brad Jones Racing	Chevrolet Camaro ZL1	SYD; R1; 7	SYD; R2; 8	SYD; R3; 16	MEL; R4; 12	MEL; R5; 5	MEL; R6; 15	MEL; R7; C	TAU; R8; 8	TAU; R9; 8	TAU; R10; 6	SYM; R11; 16	SYM; R12; 15	SYM; R13; 8	BAR; R14; 21	BAR; R15; 22	BAR; R16; 10	HID; R17; 10	HID; R18; 4	HID; R19; 6	TOW; R20; 11	TOW; R21; 16	TOW; R22; 11	QLD; R23; 21	QLD; R24; 12	QLD; R25; 7	BEN; R26; 27	BAT; R27; 7	SUR; R28; 7	SUR; R29; 3	SAN; R30; 17	SAN; R31; 10	ADE; R32; 7	ADE; R33; 17	ADE; R34; 7					11th	1784
2026	Brad Jones Racing	Toyota GR Supra	SMP; R1; 8	SMP; R2; Ret	SMP; R3; 9	MEL; R4; 14	MEL; R5; 9	MEL; R6; 9	MEL; R7; 15	TAU; R8; 12	TAU; R9; 12	CHR; R10; 13	CHR; R11; 23	CHR; R12; 15	CHR; R13; 8	SYM; R14; 5	SYM; R15; 1	SYM; R16; 14	HID; R17; 11	HID; R18; 14	HID; R19; 11	TOW; R20; 15	TOW; R21; 16	TOW; R22; Ret	BAR; R23; 8	BAR; R24; 7	BAR; R25; 11	QLD; R26	QLD; R27	QLD; R28	BEN; R28	BAT; R30	SUR; R31	SUR; R32	SAN; R33	SAN; R34	ADE; R35	ADE; R36	ADE; R37		13th*	967*

=== Complete Bathurst 1000 results ===
Year	Team	Car	Co-driver	Position	Laps
2014	Super Black Racing	Ford Falcon FG	(New Zealand) Ant Pedersen	11th	161
2015	Super Black Racing	Ford Falcon FG X	(New Zealand) Ant Pedersen	DNF	35
2016	Lucas Dumbrell Motorsport	Holden Commodore VF	(Australia) Aaren Russell	DNF	114
2017	Brad Jones Racing	Holden Commodore VF	(Australia) Tim Slade (Australia) Ashley Walsh‡	9th	161
2018	Nissan Motorsport	Nissan Altima L33	(Australia) Aaren Russell	16th	161
2019	Kelly Racing	Nissan Altima L33	(Australia) Bryce Fullwood	DNF	157
2020	Kelly Racing	Ford Mustang S550	(Australia) Dylan O'Keeffe	11th	161
2021	Kelly Grove Racing	Ford Mustang S550	(Australia) Matthew Campbell	NC	159
2022	Brad Jones Racing	Holden Commodore ZB	(Australia) Dale Wood	DNF	4
2023	Brad Jones Racing	Chevrolet Camaro Mk.6	(Australia) Dale Wood	DNF	68
2024	Brad Jones Racing	Chevrolet Camaro Mk.6	(Australia) Declan Fraser	16th	161
2025	Brad Jones Racing	Chevrolet Camaro Mk.6	(Australia) Declan Fraser	7th	161

‡Walsh was entered as a co-driver to Slade but withdrew and was replaced with Heimgartner.
