= 2021 Mount Panorama 500 =

2021 race of the Supercars Championship

(New South Wales) 2021 Mount Panorama 500
Event Information
- Round 1 of 11 in the 2021 Supercars Championship
- Layout of the Mount Panorama Circuit
- Date: 26–28 February 2021
- Location: Bathurst, New South Wales
- Venue: Mount Panorama Circuit
- Weather: Fine

Results
Race 1
Distance	40 laps	248.52 km
Pole position	(Australia) Cam Waters; Tickford Racing	2:05.5980
Winner	(New Zealand) Shane van Gisbergen; Triple Eight Race Engineering	1:30:57.4794
Race 2
Distance	40 laps	248.52 km
Pole position	(New Zealand) Shane van Gisbergen; Triple Eight Race Engineering	2:05.6170
Winner	(New Zealand) Shane van Gisbergen; Triple Eight Race Engineering	1:26:39.2785

The 2021 Mount Panorama 500 (known for commercial purposes as the 2021 Repco Mount Panorama 500) was a motor racing event held as a part of the 2021 Supercars Championship from Friday 26 February to Sunday 28 February 2021. The event was held at the Mount Panorama Circuit in Bathurst, New South Wales and was the first time the event was held since 1996. It was the first round of the 2021 Supercars Championship and consisted of two races of 250 kilometres.

The race was supported by the opening rounds of the Super 2 Series and the Touring Car Masters.

It was the seventh running of a Mount Panorama sprint race.

== Results ==
=== Race 1 ===
Pos	No.	Driver	Team	Laps	Time / Retired	Grid	Points
1	97	(New Zealand) Shane van Gisbergen	Triple Eight Race Engineering	40	1:30:57.4794	3	150
2	25	(New Zealand) Chaz Mostert	Walkinshaw Andretti United	40	+1.4272	6	138
3	17	(New Zealand) Will Davison	Dick Johnson Racing	40	+18.1372	5	129
4	18	(Australia) Mark Winterbottom	Team 18	40	+30.7375	9	120
5	2	(Australia) Bryce Fullwood	Walkinshaw Andretti United	40	+31.7330	12	111
6	5	(Australia) Jack Le Brocq	Tickford Racing	40	+37.6068	15	102
7	88	(Australia) Jamie Whincup	Triple Eight Race Engineering	40	+38.0932	7	96
8	44	(Australia) James Courtney	Tickford Racing	40	+40.1103	11	90
9	26	(Australia) David Reynolds	Kelly Grove Racing	40	+51.9321	13	84
10	14	(Australia) Todd Hazelwood	Brad Jones Racing	40	+53.8484	16	78
11	99	(Australia) Brodie Kostecki	Erebus Motorsport	40	+54.3759	8	72
12	35	(Australia) Zane Goddard	Matt Stone Racing	40	+1:02.9119	18	69
13	34	(Australia) Jake Kostecki	Matt Stone Racing	40	+1:03.8923	23	66
14	19	(New Zealand) Fabian Coulthard	Team Sydney	40	+1:10.1724	20	63
15	7	(New Zealand) Andre Heimgartner	Kelly Grove Racing	40	+1:25.7690	14	60
16	9	(Australia) Will Brown	Erebus Motorsport	40	+1:41.1237	17	57
17	4	(Australia) Jack Smith	Brad Jones Racing	39	+1 lap	22	54
18	8	(Australia) Nick Percat	Brad Jones Racing	38	+2 laps	24	51
19	20	(Australia) Scott Pye	Team 18	38	+2 laps	10	38
20	6	(Australia) Cam Waters	Tickford Racing	34	+6 laps	1	45
Ret	3	(Australia) Tim Slade	Blanchard Racing Team	35	Crash damage	2	0
Ret	22	(Australia) Garry Jacobson	Team Sydney	31		19	0
Ret	96	(Australia) Macauley Jones	Brad Jones Racing	16		21	0
Ret	100	(Australia) Anton De Pasquale	Dick Johnson Racing	6	Crash damage	4	0

=== Race 2 ===
Pos	No.	Driver	Team	Laps	Time / Retired	Grid	Points
1	97	(New Zealand) Shane van Gisbergen	Triple Eight Race Engineering	40	1:26:39.2785	1	150
2	6	(Australia) Cam Waters	Tickford Racing	40	+6.1277	2	138
3	25	(Australia) Chaz Mostert	Walkinshaw Andretti United	40	+8.6808	5	129
4	100	(Australia) Anton de Pasquale	Dick Johnson Racing	40	+19.3710	3	120
5	18	(Australia) Mark Winterbottom	Team 18	40	+23.2775	6	111
6	88	(Australia) Jamie Whincup	Triple Eight Race Engineering	40	+29.1514	8	102
7	17	(Australia) Will Davison	Dick Johnson Racing	40	+330.3907	4	96
8	20	(Australia) Scott Pye	Team 18	40	+33.1775	11	90
9	7	(New Zealand) Andre Heimgartner	Kelly Grove Racing	40	+42.5387	10	84
10	8	(Australia) Nick Percat	Brad Jones Racing	40	+46.3389	14	78
11	26	(Australia) David Reynolds	Kelly Grove Racing	40	+46.9541	9	72
12	99	(Australia) Brodie Kostecki	Erebus Motorsport	40	+48.3372	15	69
13	2	(Australia) Bryce Fullwood	Walkinshaw Andretti United	40	+49.2006	12	66
14	9	(Australia) Will Brown	Erebus Motorsport	40	+54.7388	16	63
15	96	(Australia) Macauley Jones	Brad Jones Racing	40	+1:01.9955	20	60
16	35	(Australia) Zane Goddard	Matt Stone Racing	40	+1:03.6367	17	57
17	34	(Australia) Jake Kostecki	Matt Stone Racing	40	+1:06.5015	18	54
18	14	(Australia) Todd Hazelwood	Brad Jones Racing	40	+1:22.0643	19	51
19	5	(Australia) Jack Le Brocq	Tickford Racing	40	+1:31.3873	13	38
20	22	(Australia) Garry Jacobson	Team Sydney	40	+1:38.9078	21	45
21	4	(Australia) Jack Smith	Brad Jones Racing	40	+2:05.2316	23	42
22	19	(New Zealand) Fabian Coulthard	Team Sydney	39	+1 lap	22	39
Ret	44	(Australia) James Courtney	Tickford Racing	9	Crash Damage	7	0
DNS	3	(Australia) Tim Slade	Blanchard Racing Team		Did not start		0

== Championship standings after the race ==
Drivers' Championship standings

	Pos.	Driver	Points
Unchanged	1	(New Zealand) Shane van Gisbergen	300
Unchanged	2	(Australia) Chaz Mostert	267
Unchanged	3	(Australia) Mark Winterbottom	231
Unchanged	4	(Australia) Will Davison	225
Unchanged	5	(Australia) Jamie Whincup	198

Teams Championship standings

	Pos.	Constructor	Points
Unchanged	1	(Australia) Triple Eight Race Engineering	498
Unchanged	2	(Australia) Walkinshaw Andretti United	444
Unchanged	3	(Australia) Team 18	363
Unchanged	4	(Australia) Dick Johnson Racing	345
Unchanged	5	(Australia) Tickford Racing	273

- Note: Only the top five positions are included for both sets of standings.
