= 2021 Darwin Triple Crown =

2021 race event of the Supercars Championship

(Northern Territory) 2021 Darwin Triple Crown
Event Information
- Round 5 of 12 in the 2021 Supercars Championship
- Date: 18-20 June 2021 Supercars Championship
- Location: Darwin, Northern Territory
- Venue: Hidden Valley Raceway
- Weather: Sunny

Results
Race 1
Distance	38 laps	110 km
Pole position	(Australia) Anton de Pasquale; Dick Johnson Racing	
Winner	(Australia) Chaz Mostert; Walkinshaw Andretti United	
Race 2
Distance	38 laps	110 km
Pole position	(Australia) Will Davison; Dick Johnson Racing	
Winner	(New Zealand) Shane van Gisbergen; Triple Eight Race Engineering	
Race 3
Distance	38 laps	110 km
Pole position	(Australia) Will Davison; Dick Johnson Racing	
Winner	(New Zealand) Shane van Gisbergen; Triple Eight Race Engineering	

The 2021 Darwin Triple Crown (known for sponsorship reasons as the 2021 Merlin Darwin Triple Crown) was a motor racing event held on the weekend of 18-20 June 2021 at Hidden Valley Raceway in Darwin, Northern Territory. It was the fifth round of the 2021 Supercars Championship with three 110 kilometre races conducted.

== Results ==
=== Race 1 ===
Pos	No.	Driver	Team	Laps	Gap/Retired	Grid	Points
1	25	(Australia) Chaz Mostert	Walkinshaw Andretti United	38		8	100
2	6	(Australia) Cam Waters	Tickford Racing	38	+12.390 s	7	92
3	8	(Australia) Nick Percat	Brad Jones Racing	38	+15.361 s	5	86
4	44	(Australia) James Courtney	Tickford Racing	38	+21.421 s	21	80
5	9	(Australia) Will Brown	Erebus Motorsport	38	+23.315 s	22	74
6	34	(Australia) Jake Kostecki	Matt Stone Racing	38	+24.763 s	11	68
7	27	(Australia) Kurt Kostecki	Walkinshaw Andretti United	38	+25.244 s	15	64
8	3	(Australia) Tim Slade	Blanchard Racing Team	38	+25.660 s	9	60
9	99	(Australia) Brodie Kostecki	Erebus Motorsport	38	+25.730 s	13	56
10	55	(Australia) Thomas Randle	Tickford Racing	38	+25.984 s	17	52
11	2	(Australia) Bryce Fullwood	Walkinshaw Andretti United	38	+26.497 s	19	48
12	88	(Australia) Jamie Whincup	Triple Eight Race Engineering	38	+26.704 s	6	46
13	97	(New Zealand) Shane van Gisbergen	Triple Eight Race Engineering	38	+28.509 s	3	49
14	17	(Australia) Will Davison	Dick Johnson Racing	38	+29.240 s	24	42
15	7	(New Zealand) Andre Heimgartner	Kelly Grove Racing	38	+30.089 s	26	40
16	35	(Australia) Zane Goddard	Matt Stone Racing	38	+35.349 s	10	38
17	96	(Australia) Macauley Jones	Brad Jones Racing	38	+36.924 s	12	36
18	22	(Australia) Garry Jacobson	Team Sydney	38	+37.117 s	20	34
19	26	(Australia) David Reynolds	Kelly Grove Racing	38	+37.467 s	25	32
20	5	(Australia) Jack Le Brocq	Tickford Racing	38	+39.622 s	23	30
21	20	(Australia) Scott Pye	Team 18	36	+2 Laps	4	28
22	18	(Australia) Mark Winterbottom	Team 18	29	+9 Laps	2	26
NC	11	(Australia) Anton de Pasquale	Dick Johnson Racing	0	Accident	1	0
NC	14	(Australia) Todd Hazelwood	Brad Jones Racing	0	Accident	16	0
NC	19	(New Zealand) Fabian Coulthard	Team Sydney	0	Accident	14	0
NC	4	(Australia) Jack Smith	Brad Jones Racing	0	Accident	18	0

=== Race 2 ===
Pos	No.	Driver	Team	Laps	Gap/Retired	Grid	Points
1	97	(New Zealand) Shane van Gisbergen	Triple Eight Race Engineering	38		2	100
2	17	(Australia) Will Davison	Dick Johnson Racing	38	+1.532 s	1	92
3	88	(Australia) Jamie Whincup	Triple Eight Race Engineering	38	+6.679 s	6	86
4	25	(Australia) Chaz Mostert	Walkinshaw Andretti United	38	+9.042 s	8	85
5	18	(Australia) Mark Winterbottom	Team 18	38	+9.532 s	4	74
6	11	(Australia) Anton de Pasquale	Dick Johnson Racing	38	+9.810 s	3	68
7	6	(Australia) Cam Waters	Tickford Racing	38	+12.342 s	7	64
8	9	(Australia) Will Brown	Erebus Motorsport	38	+16.617 s	5	60
9	8	(Australia) Nick Percat	Brad Jones Racing	38	+17.145 s	10	56
10	44	(Australia) James Courtney	Tickford Racing	38	+21.681 s	16	52
11	5	(Australia) Jack Le Brocq	Tickford Racing	38	+22.401 s	11	48
12	2	(Australia) Bryce Fullwood	Walkinshaw Andretti United	38	+24.995 s	15	46
13	20	(Australia) Scott Pye	Team 18	38	+25.506 s	9	44
14	14	(Australia) Todd Hazelwood	Brad Jones Racing	38	+28.507 s	19	42
15	99	(Australia) Brodie Kostecki	Erebus Motorsport	38	+29.681 s	23	40
16	19	(New Zealand) Fabian Coulthard	Team Sydney	38	+30.108	22	38
17	7	(New Zealand) Andre Heimgartner	Kelly Grove Racing	38	+30.395 s	18	36
18	26	(Australia) David Reynolds	Kelly Grove Racing	38	+30.908 s	21	34
19	3	(Australia) Tim Slade	Blanchard Racing Team	38	+31.376 s	13	32
20	96	(Australia) Macauley Jones	Brad Jones Racing	38	+37.623	12	30
21	35	(Australia) Zane Goddard	Matt Stone Racing	38	+40.455 s	20	28
22	4	(Australia) Jack Smith	Brad Jones Racing	38	+40.619 s	26	26
23	27	(Australia) Kurt Kostecki	Walkinshaw Andretti United	38	+48.870 s	25	24
24	34	(Australia) Jake Kostecki	Matt Stone Racing	37	+1 Lap	14	22
25	55	(Australia) Thomas Randle	Tickford Racing	31	+7 Laps	17	20
NC	22	(Australia) Garry Jacobson	Team Sydney	18	Steering	24	0

=== Race 3 ===
Pos	No.	Driver	Team	Laps	Time/Retired	Grid	Points
1	97	(New Zealand) Shane van Gisbergen	Triple Eight Race Engineering	38		2	100
2	17	(Australia) Will Davison	Dick Johnson Racing	38	+2.320 s	1	92
3	88	(Australia) Jamie Whincup	Triple Eight Race Engineering	38	+3.030 s	4	86
4	25	(Australia) Chaz Mostert	Walkinshaw Andretti United	38	+4.018 s	10	80
5	44	(Australia) James Courtney	Tickford Racing	38	+5.729 s	5	74
6	8	(Australia) Nick Percat	Brad Jones Racing	38	+11.928 s	7	68
7	18	(Australia) Mark Winterbottom	Team 18	38	+12.659 s	8	64
8	6	(Australia) Cam Waters	Tickford Racing	38	+13.205 s	12	60
9	3	(Australia) Tim Slade	Blanchard Racing Team	38	+17.695 s	14	56
10	9	(Australia) Will Brown	Erebus Motorsport	38	+22.046 s	11	52
11	55	(Australia) Thomas Randle	Tickford Racing	38	+22.302 s	16	48
12	11	(Australia) Anton de Pasquale	Dick Johnson Racing	38	+22.751 s	3	46
13	19	(New Zealand) Fabian Coulthard	Team Sydney	38	+26.550 s	17	44
14	2	(Australia) Bryce Fullwood	Walkinshaw Andretti United	38	+26.849 s	22	42
15	5	(Australia) Jack Le Brocq	Tickford Racing	38	+27.596 s	19	40
16	20	(Australia) Scott Pye	Team 18	38	+27.901 s	6	38
17	27	(Australia) Kurt Kostecki	Walkinshaw Andretti United	38	+30.262 s	25	36
18	22	(Australia) Garry Jacobson	Team Sydney	38	+35.413 s	24	34
19	26	(Australia) David Reynolds	Kelly Grove Racing	38	+37.401 s	15	32
20	96	(Australia) Macauley Jones	Brad Jones Racing	38	+39.654 s	9	30
21	14	(Australia) Todd Hazelwood	Brad Jones Racing	38	+40.469 s	20	28
22	4	(Australia) Jack Smith	Brad Jones Racing	38	+43.692 s	23	26
23	35	(Australia) Zane Goddard	Matt Stone Racing	38	+46.718 s	18	24
24	99	(Australia) Brodie Kostecki	Erebus Motorsport	38	+57.519 s	21	22
25	34	(Australia) Jake Kostecki	Matt Stone Racing	38	+58.395 s	26	20
NC	7	(New Zealand) Andre Heimgartner	Kelly Grove Racing	4	Suspension	13	0

=== Round Points ===
Pos	No.	Driver	Team	Points
1	25	(Australia) Chaz Mostert	Walkinshaw Andretti United	265
2	97	(New Zealand) Shane van Gisbergen	Triple Eight Race Engineering	249
3	17	(Australia) Will Davison	Dick Johnson Racing	226
4	88	(Australia) Jamie Whincup	Triple Eight Race Engineering	218
5	6	(Australia) Cam Waters	Tickford Racing	216
6	8	(Australia) Nick Percat	Brad Jones Racing	210
7	9	(Australia) Will Brown	Erebus Motorsport	197
8	44	(Australia) James Courtney	Tickford Racing	178
9	18	(Australia) Mark Winterbottom	Team 18	164
10	3	(Australia) Tim Slade	Blanchard Racing Team	152
11	2	(Australia) Bryce Fullwood	Walkinshaw Andretti United	136
12	27	(Australia) Kurt Kostecki	Walkinshaw Andretti United	128
13	55	(Australia) Thomas Randle	Tickford Racing	124
14	99	(Australia) Brodie Kostecki	Erebus Motorsport	122
15	5	(Australia) Jack Le Brocq	Tickford Racing	118
16	34	(Australia) Jake Kostecki	Matt Stone Racing	116
17	11	(Australia) Anton de Pasquale	Dick Johnson Racing	114
18	20	(Australia) Scott Pye	Team 18	110
19	26	(Australia) David Reynolds	Kelly Grove Racing	98
20	96	(Australia) Macauley Jones	Brad Jones Racing	96
21	35	(Australia) Zane Goddard	Matt Stone Racing	90
22	19	(New Zealand) Fabian Coulthard	Team Sydney	82
23	7	(New Zealand) Andre Heimgartner	Kelly Grove Racing	76
24	14	(Australia) Todd Hazelwood	Brad Jones Racing	70
25	22	(Australia) Garry Jacobson	Team Sydney	68
26	4	(Australia) Jack Smith	Brad Jones Racing	52
