= 2016 Ipswich SuperSprint =

2016 V8 Supercar championship race

(Queensland) 2016 Coates Hire Ipswich SuperSprint
Event Information
- Round 8 of 14 in the 2016 International V8 Supercars Championship
- Date: 8–10 July 2016
- Location: Ipswich, Queensland
- Venue: Queensland Raceway
- Weather: Friday: fine Saturday: fine Sunday: fine

Results
Race 1
Distance	38 laps	120 km
Pole position	Chris Pither; Super Black Racing	1:10.0378
Winner	Shane van Gisbergen; Triple Eight Race Engineering	45:59.3567
Race 2
Distance	65 laps	200 km
Pole position	Jamie Whincup; Triple Eight Race Engineering	1:09.4113
Winner	Craig Lowndes; Triple Eight Race Engineering	1:19:07.4961

The 2016 Coates Hire Ipswich SuperSprint was a motor racing event for Supercars, held on the weekend of 22 to 24 July 2016. The event was held at Queensland Raceway in Ipswich, Queensland, and consisted of one race of 120 kilometres and one race of 200 km in length. It was the eighth event of fourteen in the 2016 International V8 Supercars Championship and hosted Races 16 and 17 of the season. The event was the 16th running of the Ipswich SuperSprint.

The event was dominated by Triple Eight Race Engineering, with its drivers Shane van Gisbergen, Jamie Whincup and Craig Lowndes scoring a 1–2–3 result in Race 16. Lowndes and Whincup then went on to finish first and second in Race 17, while Van Gisbergen finished twelfth. Chaz Mostert completed the podium in Race 17, having finished fifth in Race 16. Chris Pither took his first career pole position in qualifying for Race 16; it was also the first for his team Super Black Racing. Whincup left the event with a 110-point championship lead over Van Gisbergen, with Mark Winterbottom a further ten points behind in third.

== Report ==
=== Background ===
In the week leading up to the event, Aaren Russell and his sponsor Plus Fitness split from Erebus Motorsport, which had been preparing Russell's car during the 2016 season. The split was the result of a dispute over payments between the team and the Russell family. Craig Baird, the endurance co-driver for Erebus Motorsport's other car, was selected to replace Russell for the event, with sponsorship from Hungry Jack's.

DJR Team Penske continued its sponsor rotation system, running a Penske Truck Rental livery on both of its cars. Nissan Motorsport ran a new livery on Michael Caruso's car, promoting the GT Academy program.

Jamie Whincup entered the event as the championship lead, 53 points ahead of his teammate Shane van Gisbergen, with defending series champion Mark Winterbottom in third.

=== Practice ===
A 30-minute practice session was held on Friday afternoon for additional drivers, consisting mostly of Enduro Cup co-drivers. The fastest time was set by Jack Le Brocq, driving Cam Waters' car. James Golding was second fastest ahead of Tony D'Alberto. The cars of Whincup, Van Gisbergen and Chris Pither did not participate in the session, with their respective co-drivers, Paul Dumbrell, Alexandre Prémat and Richie Stanaway, absent from the event.

The first session for regular drivers was held immediately after the additional drivers session and was one hour in length. Nissan Motorsport performed strongly, with Caruso setting the fastest lap time and Todd Kelly being third fastest. The pair were split by Scott Pye, with Brad Jones Racing teammates Jason Bright and Tim Slade completing the top five. A second one-hour session was held later on Friday afternoon, with Fabian Coulthard going quickest ahead of Craig Lowndes, Chaz Mostert, Rick Kelly and Pither.

A 15-minute session was held on Saturday morning. It was marred by a major accident involving Pye, who suffered a brake failure going into Turn 3. His car left the circuit at high speed and went head-on into a tyre barrier before coming to rest on top of it. Pye was not injured, but his car sustained significant front-end damage. Pye later described the incident: "I hit the brake pedal and it was solid and then clicked to the floor. That’s a horrible feeling when that happens...It came back up and I went for it again and I think it was only front brakes. It locked both front wheels and went straight on." The session was red flagged with just over one minute remaining and did not restart. Whincup had set the fastest time prior to Pye's crash, with Winterbottom second fastest ahead of Pither.

Practice summary
Session	Day	Fastest lap				
Session	Day	No.	Driver	Team	Car	Time
Additional Driver Practice	Friday	6	(Australia) Jack Le Brocq	Prodrive Racing Australia	Ford FG X Falcon	1:11.0412
Practice 1	Friday	23	(Australia) Michael Caruso	Nissan Motorsport	Nissan Altima L33	1:10.3330
Practice 2	Friday	12	(New Zealand) Fabian Coulthard	DJR Team Penske	Ford FG X Falcon	1:09.7061
Practice 3	Saturday	88	(Australia) Jamie Whincup	Triple Eight Race Engineering	Holden VF Commodore	1:10.1028

=== Qualifying – Race 16 ===
Qualifying for Race 16 was a single 15-minute session held on Saturday afternoon. Only 25 cars took part, with Pye's car still being repaired after his Practice 3 crash. Pither took a surprise pole position, the first in the series for both himself and his team Super Black Racing. Mostert was second fastest ahead of the three Triple Eight Race Engineering cars of Whincup, Lowndes and Van Gisbergen.

=== Race 16 ===
Race 16 took place on Saturday afternoon, with the regulations requiring each car to make at least one pit stop to change all four tyres. The race start was delayed when Waters' car stopped on the warm-up lap with a driveline problem. Waters later joined the race but retired after completing four laps. Pither maintained the lead at the start but was challenged by Mostert at Turn 2. Pither ran wide and pushed Mostert off the circuit, giving Whincup the chance to take second place at Turn 3. Whincup then took the lead from Pither at Turn 4, while Lowndes was also able to move past both Pither and Mostert. On lap 4, Coulthard made contact with Caruso while battling for seventh place, pushing him off the circuit. Caruso lost a number of positions and Coulthard was forced to readdress by dropping back to behind Caruso. Lowndes made his pit stop on lap 7 with the intention of using fresh tyres to jump Whincup, but Whincup pitted one lap later and held the position over his teammate.

The stops for Whincup and Lowndes left Van Gisbergen in the lead ahead of Winterbottom and Mostert, who each ran a long first stint in order to have fresher tyres at the end of the race. Van Gisbergen and Winterbottom stopped on lap 17, while Mostert stayed out until lap 23. After all drivers had completed their pit stop, Whincup led from Lowndes, Van Gisbergen, Winterbottom and Mostert, with Whincup saving fuel and coming under pressure from Lowndes. Van Gisbergen used his younger tyres to quickly close the gap to his two teammates and passed Lowndes on lap 35 before taking the lead on lap 37. Whincup was able to hold on to second place ahead of Lowndes, who in turn was able to stay ahead of Winterbottom and Mostert. Slade finished sixth ahead of Will Davison and Rick Kelly, with James Moffat and Coulthard completing the top ten. Pither finished eleventh after losing multiple positions in the opening laps. Whincup's championship lead over Van Gisbergen was reduced from 53 to 41 points, while Winterbottom fell back to be 93 points off the lead.

==== Post-race ====
Nick Percat was disqualified from the results after it was found that his front bumper was underweight. As a result, all drivers who finished behind him moved up one place.

=== Qualifying – Race 17 ===
Qualifying for Race 17 was held on Sunday morning and consisted of a single 20-minute session. Whincup took his second pole position of the season ahead of teammate Lowndes, who saved a set of tyres for the race by not doing a third run in the session. Mostert was third fastest ahead of Van Gisbergen, Winterbottom and Pye. Winterbottom was disappointed with the session after being held up by Kurt Kostecki, who was in only his second Supercars event as a replacement for the injured Lee Holdsworth, on his final run. With his Prodrive Racing Australia teammate Waters also affected by Kostecki, team principal Tim Edwards questioned the licensing system used in the series, saying: "We should have better licensing that people of that level of experience can’t go and do that. It’s bloody disappointing."

=== Race 17 ===
Race 17 was held on Sunday afternoon and the race regulations required each car to take on at least 120 litres of fuel during the race. Lowndes made the best start and moved into the lead ahead of Whincup and Van Gisbergen, with Mostert and Winterbottom completing the top five. Pye's difficult weekend continued when he was spun by James Courtney on lap 2; Courtney received a drive-through penalty for his role in the incident. The leaders began making their first pit stops on lap 12, with Winterbottom, Caruso and Scott McLaughlin pitting from fifth, sixth and eighth place respectively. Whincup stopped on lap 14, followed by Lowndes on lap 16 and Van Gisbergen on lap 17, while Mostert stayed out until lap 19. Lowndes maintained his lead over Whincup through the pit stops, while Winterbottom moved up to third place. Both Whincup and Van Gisbergen started to struggle with the balance of their cars and Whincup ran wide at the final corner on lap 28, losing places to Winterbottom and Caruso.

The second round of pit stops began when Waters pitted on lap 28, with the leaders beginning to stop on lap 33. Mostert again ran longer than the other front-runners, stopping on lap 42, giving him fresher tyres for the final stint. After all drivers had completed their second pit stop, Lowndes retained the lead ahead of Whincup, Winterbottom, Caruso and Mostert. Whincup and Winterbottom were both struggling for pace and Winterbottom lost third place to Caruso on lap 51. Mostert used his younger tyres to pass Winterbottom on lap 54 and Caruso on lap 60. Courtney retired from the race on lap 61 after sustaining suspension damage in an incident with Rick Kelly and Van Gisbergen on the previous lap. Mostert was unable to catch Whincup in the closing laps, with the pair finishing third and second respectively behind Lowndes. Caruso finished fourth ahead of Winterbottom and McLaughlin. After struggling during the race, Van Gisbergen finished twelfth, resulting in an extended championship lead of 110 points for Whincup.

==== Post-race ====
Waters was penalised ten championship points for making contact with Rick Kelly at the final corner.

== Results ==
=== Race 16 ===
==== Qualifying ====
Pos.	No.	Driver	Team	Car	Time
1	111	(New Zealand) Chris Pither	Super Black Racing	Ford FG X Falcon	1:10.0378
2	55	(Australia) Chaz Mostert	Rod Nash Racing	Ford FG X Falcon	1:10.0889
3	88	(Australia) Jamie Whincup	Triple Eight Race Engineering	Holden VF Commodore	1:10.1515
4	888	(Australia) Craig Lowndes	Triple Eight Race Engineering	Holden VF Commodore	1:10.1658
5	97	(New Zealand) Shane van Gisbergen	Triple Eight Race Engineering	Holden VF Commodore	1:10.2152
6	12	(New Zealand) Fabian Coulthard	DJR Team Penske	Ford FG X Falcon	1:10.2173
7	1	(Australia) Mark Winterbottom	Prodrive Racing Australia	Ford FG X Falcon	1:10.2562
8	23	(Australia) Michael Caruso	Nissan Motorsport	Nissan Altima L33	1:10.2731
9	14	(Australia) Tim Slade	Brad Jones Racing	Holden VF Commodore	1:10.3019
10	19	(Australia) Will Davison	Tekno Autosports	Holden VF Commodore	1:10.3864
11	22	(Australia) James Courtney	Holden Racing Team	Holden VF Commodore	1:10.3876
12	6	(Australia) Cam Waters	Prodrive Racing Australia	Ford FG X Falcon	1:10.3877
13	34	(Australia) James Moffat	Garry Rogers Motorsport	Volvo S60	1:10.3960
14	33	(New Zealand) Scott McLaughlin	Garry Rogers Motorsport	Volvo S60	1:10.4206
15	8	(Australia) Jason Bright	Brad Jones Racing	Holden VF Commodore	1:10.4753
16	15	(Australia) Rick Kelly	Nissan Motorsport	Nissan Altima L33	1:10.4998
17	7	(Australia) Todd Kelly	Nissan Motorsport	Nissan Altima L33	1:10.5511
18	96	(Australia) Dale Wood	Nissan Motorsport	Nissan Altima L33	1:10.5687
19	2	(Australia) Garth Tander	Holden Racing Team	Holden VF Commodore	1:10.6295
20	3	(New Zealand) Andre Heimgartner	Lucas Dumbrell Motorsport	Holden VF Commodore	1:10.6454
21	9	(Australia) David Reynolds	Erebus Motorsport	Holden VF Commodore	1:10.6586
22	222	(Australia) Nick Percat	Lucas Dumbrell Motorsport	Holden VF Commodore	1:10.6592
23	21	(Australia) Tim Blanchard	Britek Motorsport	Holden VF Commodore	1:10.7107
24	18	(Australia) Kurt Kostecki	Team 18	Holden VF Commodore	1:11.1208
25	4	(New Zealand) Craig Baird	Erebus Motorsport	Holden VF Commodore	1:11.3995

==== Race ====
Pos.	No.	Driver	Team	Car	Laps	Time/Retired	Grid	Points
1	97	(New Zealand) Shane van Gisbergen	Triple Eight Race Engineering	Holden VF Commodore	38	45:59.3567	5	150
2	88	(Australia) Jamie Whincup	Triple Eight Race Engineering	Holden VF Commodore	38	+0.8 s	3	138
3	888	(Australia) Craig Lowndes	Triple Eight Race Engineering	Holden VF Commodore	38	+1.1 s	4	129
4	1	(Australia) Mark Winterbottom	Prodrive Racing Australia	Ford FG X Falcon	38	+1.3 s	7	120
5	55	(Australia) Chaz Mostert	Rod Nash Racing	Ford FG X Falcon	38	+1.8 s	2	111
6	14	(Australia) Tim Slade	Brad Jones Racing	Holden VF Commodore	38	+7.3 s	9	102
7	19	(Australia) Will Davison	Tekno Autosports	Holden VF Commodore	38	+25.4 s	10	96
8	15	(Australia) Rick Kelly	Nissan Motorsport	Nissan Altima L33	38	+26.5 s	16	90
9	34	(Australia) James Moffat	Garry Rogers Motorsport	Volvo S60	38	+27.3 s	13	84
10	12	(New Zealand) Fabian Coulthard	DJR Team Penske	Ford FG X Falcon	38	+27.5 s	6	78
11	111	(New Zealand) Chris Pither	Super Black Racing	Ford FG X Falcon	38	+27.9 s	1	72
12	7	(Australia) Todd Kelly	Nissan Motorsport	Nissan Altima L33	38	+28.2 s	17	69
13	22	(Australia) James Courtney	Holden Racing Team	Holden VF Commodore	38	+30.3 s	11	66
14	2	(Australia) Garth Tander	Holden Racing Team	Holden VF Commodore	38	+32.1 s	19	63
15	33	(New Zealand) Scott McLaughlin	Garry Rogers Motorsport	Volvo S60	38	+32.5 s	14	60
16	8	(Australia) Jason Bright	Brad Jones Racing	Holden VF Commodore	38	+33.1 s	15	57
17	96	(Australia) Dale Wood	Nissan Motorsport	Nissan Altima L33	38	+33.7 s	18	54
18	21	(Australia) Tim Blanchard	Britek Motorsport	Holden VF Commodore	38	+34.8 s	23	51
19	3	(New Zealand) Andre Heimgartner	Lucas Dumbrell Motorsport	Holden VF Commodore	38	+35.3 s	20	48
20	17	(Australia) Scott Pye	DJR Team Penske	Ford FG X Falcon	38	+38.6 s	26	45
21	9	(Australia) David Reynolds	Erebus Motorsport	Holden VF Commodore	38	+42.4 s	21	42
22	23	(Australia) Michael Caruso	Nissan Motorsport	Nissan Altima L33	38	+42.8 s	8	39
23	18	(Australia) Kurt Kostecki	Team 18	Holden VF Commodore	38	+49.0 s	24	36
24	4	(New Zealand) Craig Baird	Erebus Motorsport	Holden VF Commodore	38	+52.3 s	25	33
Ret	6	(Australia) Cam Waters	Prodrive Racing Australia	Ford FG X Falcon	4	Driveline	12	
DSQ	222	(Australia) Nick Percat	Lucas Dumbrell Motorsport	Holden VF Commodore	38	Disqualified	22	

=== Race 17 ===
==== Qualifying ====
Pos.	No.	Driver	Team	Car	Time
1	88	(Australia) Jamie Whincup	Triple Eight Race Engineering	Holden VF Commodore	1:09.4113
2	888	(Australia) Craig Lowndes	Triple Eight Race Engineering	Holden VF Commodore	1:09.5012
3	55	(Australia) Chaz Mostert	Rod Nash Racing	Ford FG X Falcon	1:09.5752
4	97	(New Zealand) Shane van Gisbergen	Triple Eight Race Engineering	Holden VF Commodore	1:09.6041
5	1	(Australia) Mark Winterbottom	Prodrive Racing Australia	Ford FG X Falcon	1:09.6424
6	17	(Australia) Scott Pye	DJR Team Penske	Ford FG X Falcon	1:09.6814
7	23	(Australia) Michael Caruso	Nissan Motorsport	Nissan Altima L33	1:09.6923
8	14	(Australia) Tim Slade	Brad Jones Racing	Holden VF Commodore	1:09.7029
9	111	(New Zealand) Chris Pither	Super Black Racing	Ford FG X Falcon	1:09.7219
10	33	(New Zealand) Scott McLaughlin	Garry Rogers Motorsport	Volvo S60	1:09.7481
11	22	(Australia) James Courtney	Holden Racing Team	Holden VF Commodore	1:09.7519
12	6	(Australia) Cam Waters	Prodrive Racing Australia	Ford FG X Falcon	1:09.7784
13	34	(Australia) James Moffat	Garry Rogers Motorsport	Volvo S60	1:09.7789
14	15	(Australia) Rick Kelly	Nissan Motorsport	Nissan Altima L33	1:09.7858
15	12	(New Zealand) Fabian Coulthard	DJR Team Penske	Ford FG X Falcon	1:09.8203
16	7	(Australia) Todd Kelly	Nissan Motorsport	Nissan Altima L33	1:09.8397
17	19	(Australia) Will Davison	Tekno Autosports	Holden VF Commodore	1:09.8828
18	8	(Australia) Jason Bright	Brad Jones Racing	Holden VF Commodore	1:09.9454
19	9	(Australia) David Reynolds	Erebus Motorsport	Holden VF Commodore	1:09.9794
20	96	(Australia) Dale Wood	Nissan Motorsport	Nissan Altima L33	1:10.0133
21	21	(Australia) Tim Blanchard	Britek Motorsport	Holden VF Commodore	1:10.1333
22	3	(New Zealand) Andre Heimgartner	Lucas Dumbrell Motorsport	Holden VF Commodore	1:10.1682
23	2	(Australia) Garth Tander	Holden Racing Team	Holden VF Commodore	1:10.1998
24	222	(Australia) Nick Percat	Lucas Dumbrell Motorsport	Holden VF Commodore	1:10.2109
25	18	(Australia) Kurt Kostecki	Team 18	Holden VF Commodore	1:10.4648
26	4	(New Zealand) Craig Baird	Erebus Motorsport	Holden VF Commodore	1:10.6464

==== Race ====
Pos.	No.	Driver	Team	Car	Laps	Time/Retired	Grid	Points
1	888	(Australia) Craig Lowndes	Triple Eight Race Engineering	Holden VF Commodore	65	1:19:07.4961	2	150
2	88	(Australia) Jamie Whincup	Triple Eight Race Engineering	Holden VF Commodore	65	+2.6 s	1	138
3	55	(Australia) Chaz Mostert	Rod Nash Racing	Ford FG X Falcon	65	+4.9 s	3	129
4	23	(Australia) Michael Caruso	Nissan Motorsport	Nissan Altima L33	65	+5.8 s	7	120
5	1	(Australia) Mark Winterbottom	Prodrive Racing Australia	Ford FG X Falcon	65	+7.8 s	5	111
6	33	(New Zealand) Scott McLaughlin	Garry Rogers Motorsport	Volvo S60	65	+9.6 s	10	102
7	14	(Australia) Tim Slade	Brad Jones Racing	Holden VF Commodore	65	+10.1 s	8	96
8	111	(New Zealand) Chris Pither	Super Black Racing	Ford FG X Falcon	65	+22.2 s	9	90
9	7	(Australia) Todd Kelly	Nissan Motorsport	Nissan Altima L33	65	+24.3 s	16	84
10	12	(New Zealand) Fabian Coulthard	DJR Team Penske	Ford FG X Falcon	65	+26.9 s	15	78
11	34	(Australia) James Moffat	Garry Rogers Motorsport	Volvo S60	65	+30.7 s	13	72
12	97	(New Zealand) Shane van Gisbergen	Triple Eight Race Engineering	Holden VF Commodore	65	+40.0 s	4	69
13	2	(Australia) Garth Tander	Holden Racing Team	Holden VF Commodore	65	+40.7 s	23	66
14	15	(Australia) Rick Kelly	Nissan Motorsport	Nissan Altima L33	65	+40.7 s	14	63
15	3	(New Zealand) Andre Heimgartner	Lucas Dumbrell Motorsport	Holden VF Commodore	65	+46.1 s	22	60
16	6	(Australia) Cam Waters	Prodrive Racing Australia	Ford FG X Falcon	65	+46.5 s	12	57
17	19	(Australia) Will Davison	Tekno Autosports	Holden VF Commodore	65	+49.3 s	17	54
18	8	(Australia) Jason Bright	Brad Jones Racing	Holden VF Commodore	65	+54.9 s	18	51
19	96	(Australia) Dale Wood	Nissan Motorsport	Nissan Altima L33	65	+55.5 s	20	48
20	222	(Australia) Nick Percat	Lucas Dumbrell Motorsport	Holden VF Commodore	65	+56.0 s	24	45
21	18	(Australia) Kurt Kostecki	Team 18	Holden VF Commodore	65	+1:08.8	25	42
22	4	(New Zealand) Craig Baird	Erebus Motorsport	Holden VF Commodore	65	+1:09.3	26	39
23	9	(Australia) David Reynolds	Erebus Motorsport	Holden VF Commodore	65	+1:52.2	19	36
24	17	(Australia) Scott Pye	DJR Team Penske	Ford FG X Falcon	64	+1 lap	6	33
25	21	(Australia) Tim Blanchard	Britek Motorsport	Holden VF Commodore	64	+1 lap	21	30
Ret	22	(Australia) James Courtney	Holden Racing Team	Holden VF Commodore	61	Suspension	11	

== Championship standings after the event ==
- After Race 17 of 29. Only the top five positions are included for both sets of standings.

Drivers' Championship standings

Pos.	Driver	Points
1	(Australia) Jamie Whincup	1821
2	(New Zealand) Shane van Gisbergen	1711
3	(Australia) Mark Winterbottom	1701
4	(Australia) Craig Lowndes	1671
5	(New Zealand) Scott McLaughlin	1536

Teams' Championship standings

	Pos.	Constructor	Points
	1	Triple Eight Race Engineering	3542
	2	Prodrive Racing Australia	2617
1	3	Garry Rogers Motorsport	2418
1	4	Brad Jones Racing	2403
2	5	Holden Racing Team	2377
