= 2016 Townsville 400 =

2016 V8 Supercar championship race

(Queensland) 2016 Castrol Edge Townsville 400
Event Information
- Round 7 of 14 in the 2016 International V8 Supercars Championship
- Date: 8–10 July 2016
- Location: Townsville, Queensland
- Venue: Townsville Street Circuit
- Weather: Friday: fine Saturday: fine Sunday: fine

Results
Race 1
Distance	70 laps	200 km
Pole position	Jamie Whincup; Triple Eight Race Engineering	1:12.1443
Winner	Jamie Whincup; Triple Eight Race Engineering	1:31:34.8721
Race 2
Distance	70 laps	200 km
Pole position	Mark Winterbottom; Prodrive Racing Australia	1:12.4077
Winner	Shane van Gisbergen; Triple Eight Race Engineering	1:35:25.6070

The 2016 Castrol Edge Townsville 400 was a motor racing event for Supercars, held on the weekend of 8 to 10 July 2016. The event was held at the Townsville Street Circuit in Townsville, Queensland, and consisted of two races of 200 kilometres in length. It was the seventh event of fourteen in the 2016 International V8 Supercars Championship and hosted Races 14 and 15 of the season. The event was the eighth running of the Townsville 400.

Triple Eight Race Engineering had a successful weekend with two of its drivers, Jamie Whincup and Shane van Gisbergen, finishing first and second in Race 14. Van Gisbergen won Race 15 while Whincup finished fourth. As a result, Van Gisbergen moved into second place in the championship, 53 points behind Whincup. Defending series champion Mark Winterbottom finished third in both races, while James Courtney scored his first podium finish since the Clipsal 500 Adelaide by finishing second in Race 15.

== Report ==
=== Background ===
Due to injuries sustained in a crash at the previous event in Darwin, Lee Holdsworth was unable to take part in the event. His team, Team 18, had originally planned to replace Holdsworth with its endurance co-driver Karl Reindler, however this change was abandoned when it was found that the team's chassis could not be repaired in time for the event. The team instead made a deal with Dunlop Series driver Kurt Kostecki, who would race for the team in his own chassis.

Tim Slade ran a one-off livery at the event, with major sponsorship from Alliance Truck Parts. His team, Brad Jones Racing, also announced a new technical alliance with American engineering firm Pratt & Miller in order to improve its understanding of its cars. DJR Team Penske continued its sponsor rotation, running a Hog's Breath livery on Fabian Coulthard's car, while Nissan Motorsport ran a one-off livery on Michael Caruso's car to promote a new deal between Nissan and A-League team Melbourne City. Lucas Dumbrell Motorsport took part with mostly blank cars following a failed sponsorship deal between the team and controversial Gold Coast businessman Travers Beynon.

One week prior to the event, it was announced that the Townsville 400 would remain a part of the Supercars Championship calendar until 2019.

Jamie Whincup entered the event as the championship leader, 30 points ahead of his teammate Craig Lowndes, while Scott McLaughlin was third, a further 15 points behind.

=== Practice ===
Two forty-minute practice sessions were held on Friday afternoon. The first was topped by David Reynolds, who set a time of 1:12.8697. Chaz Mostert and Will Davison were second and third fastest respectively. The three Triple Eight Race Engineering drivers all made mistakes during the session, with Lowndes spinning at Turn 2 and Shane van Gisbergen going off twice at Turn 6. Whincup hit the wall on the exit of Turn 3 at the end of the session, causing significant damage to his car. Whincup recovered to set the fastest time in the second session, with Mostert and Davison again finishing second and third.

Practice summary
Session	Day	Fastest lap				
Session	Day	No.	Driver	Team	Car	Time
Practice 1	Friday	9	(Australia) David Reynolds	Erebus Motorsport	Holden VF Commodore	1:12.8697
Practice 2	Friday	88	(Australia) Jamie Whincup	Triple Eight Race Engineering	Holden VF Commodore	1:12.5530

=== Qualifying – Race 14 ===
Qualifying for Race 14 was held on Saturday afternoon and consisted of a single 15-minute session. Whincup took his first pole position of the season, setting a time of 1:12.1443 to be fastest ahead of Van Gisbergen and James Courtney. Nick Percat was given a two-place grid penalty for blocking Aaren Russell on the run into Turn 7.

=== Race 14 ===
Race 14 was held on Saturday afternoon and the race regulations required each car to take on at least 120 litres of fuel during the race. The top three maintained their positions at the start while Davison moved up from sixth to fourth. McLaughlin and Dale Wood made contact on the opening lap, causing damage to McLaughlin's car and forcing him to pit for repairs. He later rejoined the race two laps off the lead. On lap 2, Slade was spun by Rick Kelly at Turn 11. Both drivers stopped on the track and Percat ran into the back of Kelly, who was given a drive-through penalty for causing the incident. Cam Waters was the first driver to make a pit stop, doing so on lap 9. Courtney made his first pit stop on lap 13, followed by Van Gisbergen on lap 14 and Whincup on lap 16. Following the first round of pit stops, Whincup led from Van Gisbergen, Courtney, Mostert and Winterbottom.

The second round of pit stops began on lap 35 when Slade and James Moffat completed their second stops. Whincup and Courtney stopped on lap 40, while Van Gisbergen stayed out for an extra lap. Van Gisbergen was then engaged in a close battle with Mostert, who had moved ahead of Courtney. Mostert passed Van Gisbergen on lap 47 before the latter was able to take back second place on lap 55. Kostecki hit the wall at Turn 10 on lap 51, leaving his car with damage that would take his team several laps to repair. Mostert was passed by Winterbottom on lap 59 before the safety car was deployed on lap 64 to allow Percat's car to be retrieved. Percat had suffered a steering failure and he hit the wall before stopping at Turn 7. With Van Gisbergen having to pass the lapped cars of Tim Blanchard and Chris Pither when the race restarted on lap 69, Whincup was able to win by over three seconds. Winterbottom finished third ahead of Mostert, while Davison took fifth place from Courtney on the run to the finish line. Courtney's teammate Garth Tander finished seventh after starting from 20th. The result saw Whincup extend his championship lead to 83 points, with Van Gisbergen moving into second place ahead of Winterbottom.

=== Qualifying – Race 15 ===
Qualifying for Race 15 consisted of a 20-minute session on Sunday morning followed by a top ten shootout for the fastest ten qualifiers in the afternoon. Van Gisbergen set the fastest time in the qualifying session ahead of Whincup and Winterbottom. Davison, Lowndes, McLaughlin, Mostert, Reynolds, Scott Pye and Tander also progressed to the top ten shootout. Jason Bright made contact with Moffat at Turn 2, damaging the latter's steering. Bright was found guilty of careless driving and was given a three-place grid penalty for Race 15. Kostecki was given a two-place grid penalty for impeding Slade.

The top ten shootout saw each of the ten drivers complete one flying lap each, in reverse order of their qualifying positions. Tander was the first driver to complete his lap and set a time of 1:13.1274, which was narrowly beaten by Pye. Reynolds improved on Pye's time by nearly half a second, setting a time of 1:12.6286, which Mostert and McLaughlin were both unable to beat. Lowndes then went fastest with a time of 1:12.5102, before Winterbottom eclipsed this by one tenth of a second. Neither Whincup nor Van Gisbergen were able to match Winterbottom's time and they qualified third and fourth respectively, behind Lowndes.

=== Race 15 ===
Race 15 was held on Sunday afternoon and the race regulations required each car to take on at least 120 litres of fuel during the race. Reynolds made the best start and moved from fifth to second in the opening lap, behind Winterbottom and ahead of Whincup and Van Gisbergen. Slade and Todd Kelly both entered the pit lane at the end of the first lap after making contact with each other and Rick Kelly at the start and incurring damage. After locking a brake and damaging one of his front tyres, Van Gisbergen was the first driver to make a scheduled pit stop, doing so on lap 12. Winterbottom stopped on lap 14, followed by Reynolds one lap later, while Whincup stayed out until lap 24. Running longer on older tyres hurt Whincup's times and he rejoined the race in twelfth place, while Winterbottom continued to lead from Van Gisbergen and Reynolds. Kostecki crashed on lap 30 due to a mechanical failure, leading to the deployment of the safety car and triggering the second round of pit stops.

Winterbottom maintained the lead ahead of Van Gisbergen and Reynolds, while Whincup moved up to fourth place having needed less fuel than other drivers in the second pit stop. The race was restarted on lap 37 and Van Gisbergen took the lead one lap later, passing Winterbottom at the final corner. Percat retired from the race on lap 41 with another steering failure. Triple Eight Race Engineering had fitted the wrong rear tyres on Lowndes' car during his second pit stop and as a result he dropped from sixth place on lap 47 to 17th ten laps later, before stopping for a tyre change on lap 58. The safety car was deployed on lap 62 after Andre Heimgartner stopped on the circuit and most of the drivers outside the top six took the opportunity to stop and fit fresh tyres. The race restarted on lap 65 with Van Gisbergen leading Winterbottom, Whincup, McLaughlin and Reynolds, while Courtney was ninth and the highest placed of those who had stopped.

Courtney passed both Moffat and Tander on lap 65 and he continued to move forwards in the closing laps, passing Whincup for third on lap 69. Van Gisbergen had built enough of a gap to take victory, but Winterbottom was passed by Courtney on the run to the finish line. Whincup and McLaughlin finished fourth and fifth, while sixth through to tenth place were filled by drivers who had taken on new tyres: Waters, Pye, Caruso, Bright and Lowndes. Whincup maintained the championship lead, which was cut to 53 points over Van Gisbergen with Winterbottom a further 22 points behind in third.

==== Post-race ====
The Holden Racing Team was fined A$3000 and penalised 30 Teams' Championship points after a wheel nut rolled across the pit lane in Tander's first pit stop.

== Results ==
=== Race 14 ===
==== Qualifying ====
Pos.	No.	Driver	Team	Car	Time
1	88	(Australia) Jamie Whincup	Triple Eight Race Engineering	Holden VF Commodore	1:12.1443
2	97	(New Zealand) Shane van Gisbergen	Triple Eight Race Engineering	Holden VF Commodore	1:12.3242
3	22	(Australia) James Courtney	Holden Racing Team	Holden VF Commodore	1:12.4368
4	55	(Australia) Chaz Mostert	Rod Nash Racing	Ford FG X Falcon	1:12.4544
5	1	(Australia) Mark Winterbottom	Prodrive Racing Australia	Ford FG X Falcon	1:12.4554
6	19	(Australia) Will Davison	Tekno Autosports	Holden VF Commodore	1:12.4952
7	14	(Australia) Tim Slade	Brad Jones Racing	Holden VF Commodore	1:12.5399
8	23	(Australia) Michael Caruso	Nissan Motorsport	Nissan Altima L33	1:12.5653
9	34	(Australia) James Moffat	Garry Rogers Motorsport	Volvo S60	1:12.5722
10	12	(New Zealand) Fabian Coulthard	DJR Team Penske	Ford FG X Falcon	1:12.5767
11	888	(Australia) Craig Lowndes	Triple Eight Race Engineering	Holden VF Commodore	1:12.6550
12	9	(Australia) David Reynolds	Erebus Motorsport	Holden VF Commodore	1:12.7032
13	7	(Australia) Todd Kelly	Nissan Motorsport	Nissan Altima L33	1:12.7342
14	6	(Australia) Cam Waters	Prodrive Racing Australia	Ford FG X Falcon	1:12.7433
15	15	(Australia) Rick Kelly	Nissan Motorsport	Nissan Altima L33	1:12.7700
16	8	(Australia) Jason Bright	Brad Jones Racing	Holden VF Commodore	1:12.7781
17	222	(Australia) Nick Percat	Lucas Dumbrell Motorsport	Holden VF Commodore	1:12.8014
18	33	(New Zealand) Scott McLaughlin	Garry Rogers Motorsport	Volvo S60	1:12.8182
19	96	(Australia) Dale Wood	Nissan Motorsport	Nissan Altima L33	1:12.8198
20	2	(Australia) Garth Tander	Holden Racing Team	Holden VF Commodore	1:12.8836
21	17	(Australia) Scott Pye	DJR Team Penske	Ford FG X Falcon	1:12.9819
22	111	(New Zealand) Chris Pither	Super Black Racing	Ford FG X Falcon	1:12.9916
23	21	(Australia) Tim Blanchard	Britek Motorsport	Holden VF Commodore	1:13.0055
24	3	(New Zealand) Andre Heimgartner	Lucas Dumbrell Motorsport	Holden VF Commodore	1:13.1705
25	4	(Australia) Aaren Russell	Erebus Motorsport	Holden VF Commodore	1:13.5333
26	18	(Australia) Kurt Kostecki	Team 18	Holden VF Commodore	1:13.8822

==== Race ====
Pos.	No.	Driver	Team	Car	Laps	Time/Retired	Grid	Points
1	88	(Australia) Jamie Whincup	Triple Eight Race Engineering	Holden VF Commodore	70	1:31:34.8721	1	150
2	97	(New Zealand) Shane van Gisbergen	Triple Eight Race Engineering	Holden VF Commodore	70	+3.6 s	2	138
3	1	(Australia) Mark Winterbottom	Prodrive Racing Australia	Ford FG X Falcon	70	+5.1 s	5	129
4	55	(Australia) Chaz Mostert	Rod Nash Racing	Ford FG X Falcon	70	+6.7 s	4	120
5	19	(Australia) Will Davison	Tekno Autosports	Holden VF Commodore	70	+7.9 s	6	111
6	22	(Australia) James Courtney	Holden Racing Team	Holden VF Commodore	70	+7.9 s	3	102
7	2	(Australia) Garth Tander	Holden Racing Team	Holden VF Commodore	70	+8.5 s	20	96
8	12	(New Zealand) Fabian Coulthard	DJR Team Penske	Ford FG X Falcon	70	+8.7 s	10	90
9	23	(Australia) Michael Caruso	Nissan Motorsport	Nissan Altima L33	70	+9.2 s	8	84
10	7	(Australia) Todd Kelly	Nissan Motorsport	Nissan Altima L33	70	+9.5 s	13	78
11	9	(Australia) David Reynolds	Erebus Motorsport	Holden VF Commodore	70	+10.3 s	12	72
12	888	(Australia) Craig Lowndes	Triple Eight Race Engineering	Holden VF Commodore	70	+11.7 s	11	69
13	14	(Australia) Tim Slade	Brad Jones Racing	Holden VF Commodore	70	+12.8 s	7	66
14	8	(Australia) Jason Bright	Brad Jones Racing	Holden VF Commodore	70	+14.1 s	16	63
15	3	(New Zealand) Andre Heimgartner	Lucas Dumbrell Motorsport	Holden VF Commodore	70	+14.2 s	24	60
16	6	(Australia) Cam Waters	Prodrive Racing Australia	Ford FG X Falcon	70	+14.6 s	14	57
17	34	(Australia) James Moffat	Garry Rogers Motorsport	Volvo S60	70	+16.2 s	9	54
18	17	(Australia) Scott Pye	DJR Team Penske	Ford FG X Falcon	70	+16.4 s	21	51
19	21	(Australia) Tim Blanchard	Britek Motorsport	Holden VF Commodore	69	+1 lap	23	48
20	111	(New Zealand) Chris Pither	Super Black Racing	Ford FG X Falcon	69	+1 lap	22	45
21	15	(Australia) Rick Kelly	Nissan Motorsport	Nissan Altima L33	69	+1 lap	15	42
22	4	(Australia) Aaren Russell	Erebus Motorsport	Holden VF Commodore	69	+1 lap	25	39
23	96	(Australia) Dale Wood	Nissan Motorsport	Nissan Altima L33	69	+1 lap	18	36
24	33	(New Zealand) Scott McLaughlin	Garry Rogers Motorsport	Volvo S60	68	+2 laps	17	33
25	18	(Australia) Kurt Kostecki	Team 18	Holden VF Commodore	64	+6 laps	26	30
Ret	222	(Australia) Nick Percat	Lucas Dumbrell Motorsport	Holden VF Commodore	63	Steering	19 (Note: Percat was given a two-place grid penalty for impeding Russell during qualifying for Race 14.)	

=== Race 15 ===
==== Qualifying ====
Pos.	No.	Driver	Team	Car	Time
1	97	(New Zealand) Shane van Gisbergen	Triple Eight Race Engineering	Holden VF Commodore	1:12.6552
2	88	(Australia) Jamie Whincup	Triple Eight Race Engineering	Holden VF Commodore	1:12.7226
3	1	(Australia) Mark Winterbottom	Prodrive Racing Australia	Ford FG X Falcon	1:12.8016
4	19	(Australia) Will Davison	Tekno Autosports	Holden VF Commodore	1:12.8265
5	888	(Australia) Craig Lowndes	Triple Eight Race Engineering	Holden VF Commodore	1:12.9045
6	33	(New Zealand) Scott McLaughlin	Garry Rogers Motorsport	Volvo S60	1:12.9374
7	55	(Australia) Chaz Mostert	Rod Nash Racing	Ford FG X Falcon	1:12.9491
8	9	(Australia) David Reynolds	Erebus Motorsport	Holden VF Commodore	1:12.9888
9	17	(Australia) Scott Pye	DJR Team Penske	Ford FG X Falcon	1:12.9924
10	2	(Australia) Garth Tander	Holden Racing Team	Holden VF Commodore	1:13.0432
11	96	(Australia) Dale Wood	Nissan Motorsport	Nissan Altima L33	1:13.0536
12	22	(Australia) James Courtney	Holden Racing Team	Holden VF Commodore	1:13.0946
13	6	(Australia) Cam Waters	Prodrive Racing Australia	Ford FG X Falcon	1:13.1662
14	8	(Australia) Jason Bright	Brad Jones Racing	Holden VF Commodore	1:13.1982
15	14	(Australia) Tim Slade	Brad Jones Racing	Holden VF Commodore	1:13.2228
16	15	(Australia) Rick Kelly	Nissan Motorsport	Nissan Altima L33	1:13.2372
17	7	(Australia) Todd Kelly	Nissan Motorsport	Nissan Altima L33	1:13.2419
18	23	(Australia) Michael Caruso	Nissan Motorsport	Nissan Altima L33	1:13.2477
19	12	(New Zealand) Fabian Coulthard	DJR Team Penske	Ford FG X Falcon	1:13.2671
20	222	(Australia) Nick Percat	Lucas Dumbrell Motorsport	Holden VF Commodore	1:13.3791
21	34	(Australia) James Moffat	Garry Rogers Motorsport	Volvo S60	1:13.4574
22	111	(New Zealand) Chris Pither	Super Black Racing	Ford FG X Falcon	1:13.4722
23	3	(New Zealand) Andre Heimgartner	Lucas Dumbrell Motorsport	Holden VF Commodore	1:13.4931
24	21	(Australia) Tim Blanchard	Britek Motorsport	Holden VF Commodore	1:13.6103
25	4	(Australia) Aaren Russell	Erebus Motorsport	Holden VF Commodore	1:13.9393
26	18	(Australia) Kurt Kostecki	Team 18	Holden VF Commodore	1:14.4121

==== Top Ten Shootout ====
Pos.	No.	Driver	Team	Car	Time
1	1	(Australia) Mark Winterbottom	Prodrive Racing Australia	Ford FG X Falcon	1:12.4077
2	888	(Australia) Craig Lowndes	Triple Eight Race Engineering	Holden VF Commodore	1:12.5102
3	88	(Australia) Jamie Whincup	Triple Eight Race Engineering	Holden VF Commodore	1:12.5576
4	97	(New Zealand) Shane van Gisbergen	Triple Eight Race Engineering	Holden VF Commodore	1:12.5786
5	9	(Australia) David Reynolds	Erebus Motorsport	Holden VF Commodore	1:12.6286
6	33	(New Zealand) Scott McLaughlin	Garry Rogers Motorsport	Volvo S60	1:12.7099
7	55	(Australia) Chaz Mostert	Rod Nash Racing	Ford FG X Falcon	1:12.8185
8	19	(Australia) Will Davison	Tekno Autosports	Holden VF Commodore	1:12.9003
9	17	(Australia) Scott Pye	DJR Team Penske	Ford FG X Falcon	1:13.1264
10	2	(Australia) Garth Tander	Holden Racing Team	Holden VF Commodore	1:13.1274

==== Race ====
Pos.	No.	Driver	Team	Car	Laps	Time/Retired	Grid	Points
1	97	(New Zealand) Shane van Gisbergen	Triple Eight Race Engineering	Holden VF Commodore	70	1:35:25.6070	4	150
2	22	(Australia) James Courtney	Holden Racing Team	Holden VF Commodore	70	+1.3 s	12	138
3	1	(Australia) Mark Winterbottom	Prodrive Racing Australia	Ford FG X Falcon	70	+1.3 s	1	129
4	88	(Australia) Jamie Whincup	Triple Eight Race Engineering	Holden VF Commodore	70	+2.5 s	3	120
5	33	(New Zealand) Scott McLaughlin	Garry Rogers Motorsport	Volvo S60	70	+3.8 s	6	111
6	6	(Australia) Cam Waters	Prodrive Racing Australia	Ford FG X Falcon	70	+4.9 s	13	102
7	17	(Australia) Scott Pye	DJR Team Penske	Ford FG X Falcon	70	+5.8 s	9	96
8	23	(Australia) Michael Caruso	Nissan Motorsport	Nissan Altima L33	70	+6.1 s	18	90
9	8	(Australia) Jason Bright	Brad Jones Racing	Holden VF Commodore	70	+6.8 s	17 (Note: Bright was given a three-place grid penalty for careless driving during qualifying for Race 15.)	84
10	888	(Australia) Craig Lowndes	Triple Eight Race Engineering	Holden VF Commodore	70	+7.9 s	2	78
11	19	(Australia) Will Davison	Tekno Autosports	Holden VF Commodore	70	+9.3 s	8	72
12	15	(Australia) Rick Kelly	Nissan Motorsport	Nissan Altima L33	70	+9.3 s	15	69
13	14	(Australia) Tim Slade	Brad Jones Racing	Holden VF Commodore	70	+10.2 s	14	66
14	9	(Australia) David Reynolds	Erebus Motorsport	Holden VF Commodore	70	+11.9 s	5	63
15	12	(New Zealand) Fabian Coulthard	DJR Team Penske	Ford FG X Falcon	70	+12.1 s	19	60
16	55	(Australia) Chaz Mostert	Rod Nash Racing	Ford FG X Falcon	70	+12.7 s	7	57
17	21	(Australia) Tim Blanchard	Britek Motorsport	Holden VF Commodore	70	+13.1 s	24	54
18	96	(Australia) Dale Wood	Nissan Motorsport	Nissan Altima L33	70	+15.6 s	11	51
19	34	(Australia) James Moffat	Garry Rogers Motorsport	Volvo S60	70	+15.6 s	21	48
20	2	(Australia) Garth Tander	Holden Racing Team	Holden VF Commodore	70	+17.3 s	10	45
21	4	(Australia) Aaren Russell	Erebus Motorsport	Holden VF Commodore	70	+17.5 s	25	42
22	111	(New Zealand) Chris Pither	Super Black Racing	Ford FG X Falcon	69	+1 lap	22	39
23	7	(Australia) Todd Kelly	Nissan Motorsport	Nissan Altima L33	69	+1 lap	16	36
Ret	3	(New Zealand) Andre Heimgartner	Lucas Dumbrell Motorsport	Holden VF Commodore	60	Mechanical	23	
Ret	222	(Australia) Nick Percat	Lucas Dumbrell Motorsport	Holden VF Commodore	40	Steering	20	
Ret	18	(Australia) Kurt Kostecki	Team 18	Holden VF Commodore	29	Accident	26 (Note: Kostecki was given a two-place grid penalty for impeding Slade during qualifying for Race 15.)	

== Championship standings after the event ==
- After Race 15 of 29. Only the top five positions are included for both sets of standings.

Drivers' Championship standings

	Pos.	Driver	Points
	1	(Australia) Jamie Whincup	1545
3	2	(New Zealand) Shane van Gisbergen	1492
1	3	(Australia) Mark Winterbottom	1470
2	4	(Australia) Craig Lowndes	1392
2	5	(New Zealand) Scott McLaughlin	1374

Teams' Championship standings

	Pos.	Constructor	Points
	1	Triple Eight Race Engineering	3047
	2	Prodrive Racing Australia	2329
1	3	Holden Racing Team	2182
1	4	Garry Rogers Motorsport	2100
	5	Brad Jones Racing	2097
