= 2017 Phillip Island 500 =

2017 V8 Supercar championship race

(Victoria (state)) 2017 WD-40 Phillip Island 500
Event Information
- Round 3 of 14 in the 2017 International V8 Supercars Championship
- Date: 22–23 April 2017
- Location: Phillip Island, Victoria
- Venue: Phillip Island Grand Prix Circuit

Results
Race 1
Distance	51 laps	227 km
Pole position	(New Zealand) Scott McLaughlin; DJR Team Penske	1:29.3632
Winner	(New Zealand) Fabian Coulthard; DJR Team Penske	1:36:25.3805
Race 2
Distance	57 laps	250 km
Pole position	(New Zealand) Scott McLaughlin; DJR Team Penske	1:29.0621
Winner	(Australia) Chaz Mostert; Rod Nash Racing	1:38:54.3876

The 2017 Phillip Island 500 (commercially titled 2017 WD-40 Phillip Island 500) was a motor racing event for the Supercars Championship, held on the weekend of 22 to 23 April 2017. The event was held at the Phillip Island Grand Prix Circuit on Phillip Island, Victoria, and consisted of two races, both 250 kilometres in length. It was the third event of fourteen in the 2017 Supercars Championship and hosted Races 5 and 6 of the season.

The event was controversial as both races saw frequent tyre failures, whilst the first race also saw a spate of time penalties awarded for pit lane entry infringements.
