= Ashley Walsh =

Australian racing driver (born 1988)

- Nationality: Australian
- Born: Ashley Daniel Walsh; 11 January 1988 (age 38) Ipswich, Queensland

Supercars career
- Debut season: 2013
- Former teams: Dick Johnson Racing; Erebus Motorsport; Brad Jones Racing
- Starts: 51
- Wins: 0
- Poles: 0
- Fastest laps: 0
- Best finish: 25th in 2015

Previous series
- 2005 2006–07, 2009–10 2008 2008/09: Queensland Formula Ford Ch. Australian Formula Ford Ch. Formula Renault WEC; A1 Grand Prix

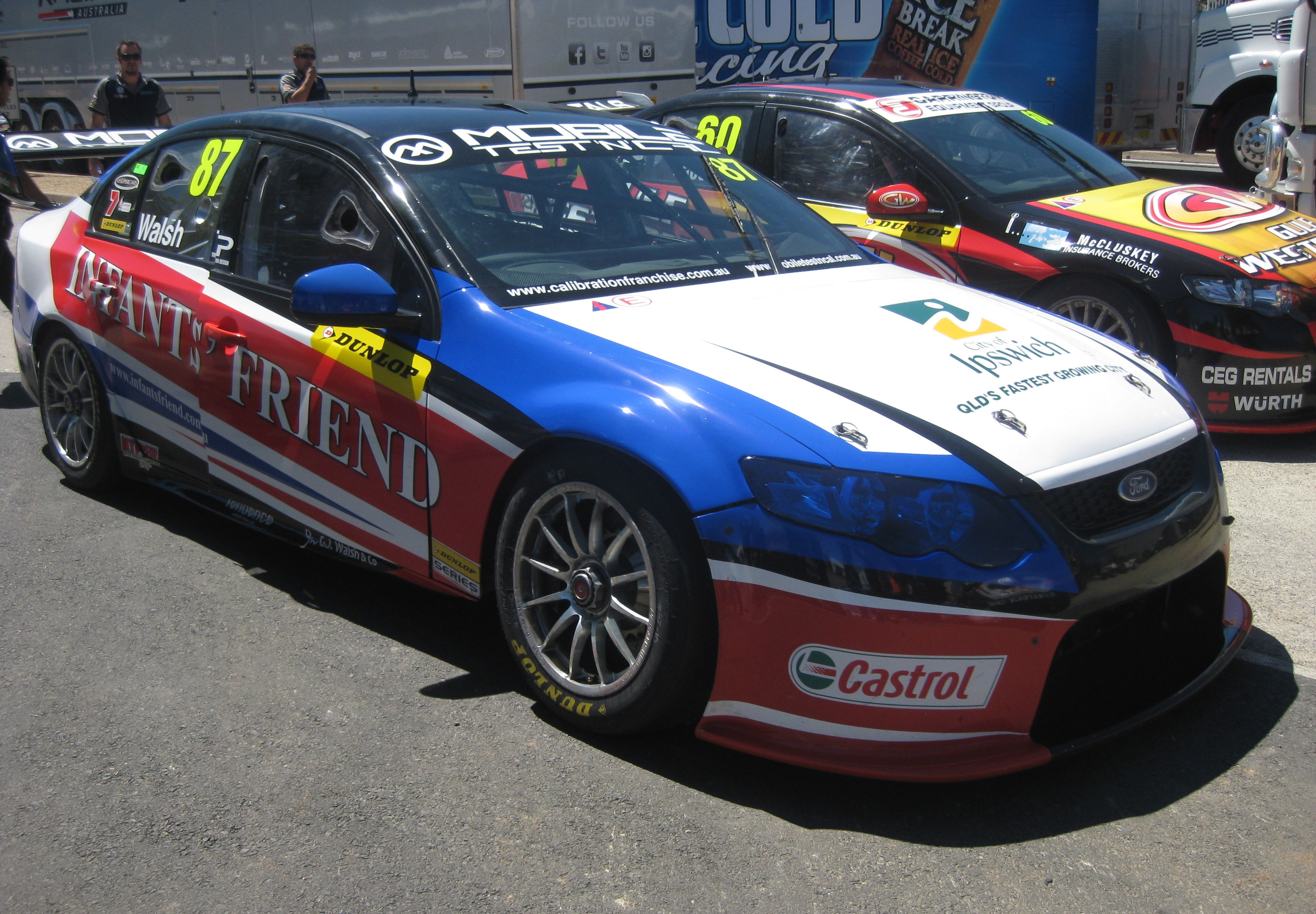
Walsh placed second in the 2013 Dunlop Series driving this Ford Falcon (FG) for Matt Stone Racing

Ashley Daniel Walsh (born 11 January 1988) is an Australian former racing driver.

== Karting ==
Walsh was a dual Australian Karting Champion in 2003 at his local Ipswich Kart Track driving a Tony Kart. He won the Junior Clubman and Junior Piston Port categories. He also won the 2004 Australian CIK Karting Championships in a Trulli Kart/IAME Parilla with Remo Racing. Walsh took up motor racing in 1999 by racing karts at the Ipswich Kart Club.

== Formula Racing ==
Walsh was part of the CAMS Rising Stars program for 2007 when he was runner-up in the 2007 Australian Formula Ford Championship whilst racing for Borland Racing Developments. In 2008, Walsh competed in the Formula Renault 2.0 West European Cup (WEC) for Hitech Junior. Walsh finished fourth in the 2010 Genuine Ford Parts Australian Formula Ford Championship. Walsh only competed in limited races in 2009, including the final two rounds of the Australian Formula Ford Championship. Walsh was also the Rookie Driver for Australia in the A1 Grand Prix Series.

== Touring Cars ==
In February 2011, Walsh finished 16th in the 2011 Armor All Bathurst 12 Hour driving a Ryan McLeod run HSV VXR Turbo and then moved into the 2011 Fujitsu V8 Supercar Series with the newly expanded Miles Racing. Walsh moved to Matt Stone Racing for the 2012 Dunlop Series and immediately achieved regular top-five finishes.

Walsh contested the 2015 V8 Supercars Championship for Erebus Motorsport in a Mercedes-Benz E63 AMG before and including the 2015 ITM 500 Auckland, after which he was dropped in favour of experienced drivers Dean Canto and Alex Davison. He contested the 2016 Enduro Cup with Tim Slade at Brad Jones Racing, finishing seventh at Bathurst despite dropping two laps down early in the race with a brake fire.

== Career results ==
=== Karting career summary ===
| Season | Series | Position |
|---|---|---|
| 2003 | Australian National Sprint Kart Championship - Junior Piston Port | **1st** |
| 2003 | Australian National Sprint Kart Championship - Junior Clubman | **1st** |
| 2004 | CIK Asian-Pacific Championship ICA | 31st |
| 2004 | Australian CIK Karting Championships | **1st** |

=== Circuit career ===
| Season | Series | Position | Car | Team |
|---|---|---|---|---|
| 2005 | Queensland Formula Ford Championship | 5th | Van Diemen RF01 Ford | CAMS Rising Star |
| 2006 | Australian Formula Ford Championship | **3rd** | Van Diemen RF06 Ford | VIP Petfoods |
| 2007 | Australian Formula Ford Championship | **2nd** | Spectrum 011B Ford | CAMS Rising Star |
| 2008 | Formula Renault 2.0 West European Cup | 19th | Tatuus – Renault | Hitech Junior |
| 2008-09 | A1 Grand Prix season | 8th † | Ferrari A1 - Ferrari V8 | A1 Team Australia |
| 2009 | Australian Formula Ford Championship | 11th | Mygale SJ08A Ford | Muzz Buzz |
| 2010 | Australian Formula Ford Championship | 4th | Spectrum 012 – Ford | CAMS Rising Star |
| 2011 | Fujitsu V8 Supercar Series | 27th | Ford Falcon (BF) | Miles Racing |
| 2012 | Dunlop V8 Supercar Series | 7th | Ford Falcon (BF) | Matt Stone Racing |
| 2013 | Dunlop V8 Supercar Series | **2nd** | Ford Falcon (FG) | Matt Stone Racing |
| 2013 | International V8 Supercars Championship | 51st | Ford Falcon (FG) | Dick Johnson Racing |
| 2013 | V8SuperTourers Championship | 24th | Holden Commodore (VE) | MPC Motorsport |
| 2014 | Dunlop V8 Supercar Series | **3rd** | Ford Falcon (FG) | Matt Stone Racing |
| 2014 | International V8 Supercars Championship | 48th | Ford Falcon (FG) | Dick Johnson Racing |
| 2015 | International V8 Supercars Championship | 25th | Mercedes-Benz E63 AMG | Erebus Motorsport |
| 2016 | Porsche Carrera Cup Australia | 6th | Porsche 911 GT3 Cup | Sonic Motor Racing Services |
| 2016 | International V8 Supercars Championship | 34th | Holden Commodore (VF) | Brad Jones Racing |
| 2017 | Virgin Australia Supercars Championship | 56th | Holden Commodore (VF) | Brad Jones Racing |
| 2017 | Australian GT Championship | **3rd** | Audi R8 LMS | Melbourne Performance Centre |
| 2018 | Virgin Australia Supercars Championship | 43rd | Holden Commodore (ZB) | Brad Jones Racing |
| 2019 | Dunlop Super2 Series | 9th | Holden Commodore (VF) | Matt Stone Racing |
| 2019 | Virgin Australia Supercars Championship | 45th | Holden Commodore (ZB) | Brad Jones Racing |

† Team result

=== Complete A1 Grand Prix results ===
(key) (Races in bold indicate pole position) (Races in italics indicate fastest lap)

| Year | Entrant | 1 | 2 | 3 | 4 | 5 | 6 | 7 | 8 | 9 | 10 | 11 | 12 | 13 | 14 | DC | Points |
|---|---|---|---|---|---|---|---|---|---|---|---|---|---|---|---|---|---|
| 2008–09 | Australia | NED; SPR | NED; FEA | CHN; SPR | CHN; FEA | MYS; SPR; PO | MYS; FEA; PO | NZL; SPR; PO | NZL; FEA; PO | RSA; SPR; PO | RSA; FEA; PO | POR; SPR | POR; FEA | GBR; SPR | GBR; FEA | 8th | 36 |

=== Complete Bathurst 12 Hour results ===
| Year | Team | Co-drivers | Car | Class | Laps | Overall position | Class position |
|---|---|---|---|---|---|---|---|
| 2011 | MARC Cars Australia | (Australia) Chaz Mostert (Australia) Gerard McLeod | HSV VXR Turbo | E | 227 | 16th | **3rd** |
| 2017 | (Australia) Miedecke Stone Motorsport | (Australia) George Miedecke (Australia) Tony Bates | Aston Martin Vantage GT3 | AAM | 75 | DNF | DNF |
| 2018 | (Australia) Superbarn Supermarkets | (Australia) James Koundouris (Australia) Theo Koundouris (Australia) Duvashen Padayachee | Audi R8 LMS | AAM | 269 | 10th | **1st** |

=== Super2 Series results ===
Super2 Series results
| Year | Team | No. | Car | 1 | 2 | 3 | 4 | 5 | 6 | 7 | 8 | 9 | 10 | 11 | 12 | 13 | 14 | 15 | 16 | 17 | 18 | Position | Points |
|---|---|---|---|---|---|---|---|---|---|---|---|---|---|---|---|---|---|---|---|---|---|---|---|
| 2011 | Miles Racing | 90 | Ford BF Falcon | ADE; R1; Ret | ADE; R2; 15 | BAR; R3; 10 | BAR; R4; 15 | TOW; R5; Ret | TOW; R6; 22 | TOW; R7; 16 | QLD; R8; 15 | QLD; R9; Ret | QLD; R10; 21 | BAT; R11; DNS | BAT; R12; DNS | SAN; R13 | SAN; R14 | SAN; R15 | SYD; R16 | SYD; R17 | | 27th | 341 |
| 2012 | Matt Stone Racing | 87 | Ford BF Falcon | ADE; R1; 4 | ADE; R2; 5 | BAR; R3; 2 | BAR; R4; 7 | BAR; R5; 7 | TOW; R6; 5 | TOW; R7; 5 | TOW; R8; Ret | QLD; R9; 5 | QLD; R10; 3 | QLD; R11; 4 | BAT; R12; 20 | BAT; R13; 11 | | | | | | 7th | 1204 |
| 2012 | Matt Stone Racing | 87 | Ford FG Falcon | | | | | | | | | | | | | | WIN; R14; 8 | WIN; R15; 8 | WIN; R16; 6 | SYD; R17; DNS | SYD; R18; 7 | 7th | 1204 |
| 2013 | Matt Stone Racing | 87 | Ford FG Falcon | ADE; R1; 1 | **ADE**; **R2**; 3 | BAR; R3; 1 | BAR; R4; 5 | **BAR**; **R5**; 2 | TOW; R6; 10 | **TOW**; **R7**; 8 | TOW; R8; 4 | QLD; R9; 4 | QLD; R10; 4 | QLD; R11; 28 | WIN; R12; 4 | WIN; R13; 4 | WIN; R14; 4 | BAT; R15; 8 | BAT; R16; 4 | SYD; R17; 1 | SYD; R18; Ret | 2nd | 1508 |
| 2014 | Matt Stone Racing | 87 | Ford FG Falcon | ADE; R1; 1 | **ADE**; **R2**; 6 | WIN; R3; 3 | WIN; R4; 1 | **BAR**; **R5**; 2 | BAR; R6; 2 | TOW; R7; 18 | TOW; R8; 1 | QLD; R9; 5 | QLD; R10; 2 | BAT; R11; Ret | SYD; R12; 12 | SYD; R13; 11 | | | | | | 3rd | 1373 |
| 2019 | Matt Stone Racing | 35 | Holden VF Commodore | ADE; R1; 6 | ADE; R2; 5 | ADE; R3; 16 | BAR; R4; 3 | BAR; R5; 1 | TOW; R6; Ret | TOW; R7; 12 | QLD; R8; 10 | QLD; R9; 14 | BAT; R10; Ret | SAN; R11; 10 | SAN; R12; 7 | NEW; R13; 4 | NEW; R14; 7 | | | | | 9th | 1059 |

=== Supercars Championship results ===
Supercars results
| Year | Team | No. | Car | 1 | 2 | 3 | 4 | 5 | 6 | 7 | 8 | 9 | 10 | 11 | 12 | 13 | 14 | 15 | 16 | 17 | 18 | 19 | 20 | 21 | 22 | 23 | 24 | 25 | 26 | 27 | 28 | 29 | 30 | 31 | 32 | 33 | 34 | 35 | 36 | 37 | 38 | 39 | Position | Points |
|---|---|---|---|---|---|---|---|---|---|---|---|---|---|---|---|---|---|---|---|---|---|---|---|---|---|---|---|---|---|---|---|---|---|---|---|---|---|---|---|---|---|---|---|---|
| 2013 | Dick Johnson Racing | 17 | Ford FG Falcon | ADE; R1 | ADE; R2 | SYM; R3 | SYM; R4 | SYM; R5 | PUK; R6 | PUK; R7 | PUK; R8 | PUK; R9 | BAR; R10 | BAR; R11 | BAR; R12 | COA; R13 | COA; R14 | COA; R15 | COA; R16 | HID; R17 | HID; R18 | HID; R19 | TOW; R20 | TOW; R21 | QLD; R22 | QLD; R23 | QLD; R24 | WIN; R25 | WIN; R26 | WIN; R27 | SAN; Q Ret | SAN; R28; Ret | BAT; R29; 15 | SUR; R30; 19 | SUR; R31; 16 | PHI; R32 | PHI; R33 | PHI; R34 | SYD; R35 | SYD; R36 | | | 51st | 225 |
| 2014 | Dick Johnson Racing | 16 | Ford FG Falcon | ADE; R1 | ADE; R2 | ADE; R3 | SYM; R4 | SYM; R5 | SYM; R6 | WIN; R7 | WIN; R8 | WIN; R9 | PUK; R10 | PUK; R11 | PUK; R12 | PUK; R13 | BAR; R14 | BAR; R15 | BAR; R16 | HID; R17 | HID; R18 | HID; R19 | TOW; R20 | TOW; R21 | TOW; R22 | QLD; R23 | QLD; R24 | QLD; R25 | SMP; R26 | SMP; R27 | SMP; R28 | SAN; Q 23 | SAN; R29; 5 | BAT; R30; Ret | SUR; R31; DSQ | SUR; R32; DSQ | PHI; R33 | PHI; R34 | PHI; R35 | SYD; R36 | SYD; R37 | SYD; R38 | 48th | 222 |
| 2015 | Erebus Motorsport | 4 | Mercedes-Benz E63 AMG | ADE; R1; 20 | ADE; R2; 8 | ADE; R3; Ret | SYM; R4; Ret | SYM; R5; 22 | SYM; R6; 21 | BAR; R7; 17 | BAR; R8; 18 | BAR; R9; 22 | WIN; R10; 22 | WIN; R11; 15 | WIN; R12; 22 | HID; R13; 21 | HID; R14; 20 | HID; R15; Ret | TOW; R16; 22 | TOW; R17; 23 | QLD; R18; 18 | QLD; R19; Ret | QLD; R20; 22 | SMP; R21; 25 | SMP; R22; 16 | SMP; R23; 21 | SAN; Q 19 | SAN; R24; 19 | BAT; R25; Ret | SUR; R26; 19 | SUR; R27; DSQ | PUK; R28; 20 | PUK; R29; 21 | PUK; R30; 24 | PHI; R31 | PHI; R32 | PHI; R33 | SYD; R34 | SYD; R35 | SYD; R36 | | | 25th | 769 |
| 2016 | Brad Jones Racing | 14 | Holden VF Commodore | ADE; R1 | ADE; R2 | ADE; R3 | SYM; R4 | SYM; R5 | PHI; R6 | PHI; R7 | BAR; R8 | BAR; R9 | WIN; R10; PO | WIN; R11; PO | HID; R12 | HID; R13 | TOW; R14 | TOW; R15 | QLD; R16; PO | QLD; R17; PO | SMP; R18 | SMP; R19 | SAN; Q 16 | SAN; R20; 16 | BAT; R21; 7 | SUR; R22; 11 | SUR; R23; 8 | PUK; R24 | PUK; R25 | PUK; R26 | PUK; R27 | SYD; R28 | SYD; R29 | | | | | | | | | | 35th | 468 |
| 2017 | Brad Jones Racing | 14 | Holden VF Commodore | ADE; R1 | ADE; R2 | SYM; R3 | SYM; R4 | PHI; R5 | PHI; R6 | BAR; R7 | BAR; R8 | WIN; R9; PO | WIN; R10; PO | HID; R11 | HID; R12 | TOW; R13 | TOW; R14 | QLD; R15; PO | QLD; R16; PO | SMP; R17 | SMP; R18 | SAN; QR; 21 | SAN; R19; DSQ | BAT; R20; PO | SUR; R21 | SUR; R22 | PUK; R23 | PUK; R24 | NEW; R25 | NEW; R26 | | | | | | | | | | | | | 55th | 0 |
| 2018 | Brad Jones Racing | 14 | Holden ZB Commodore | ADE; R1 | ADE; R2 | MEL; R3 | MEL; R4 | MEL; R5 | MEL; R6 | SYM; R7 | SYM; R8 | PHI; R9 | PHI; R10 | BAR; R11 | BAR; R12 | WIN; R13; PO | WIN; R14; PO | HID; R15 | HID; R16 | TOW; R17 | TOW; R18 | QLD; R19; PO | QLD; R20; PO | SMP; R21 | BEN; R22 | BEN; R23 | SAN; QR; 7 | SAN; R24; 15 | BAT; R25; 17 | SUR; R26; 21 | SUR; R27; C | PUK; R28 | PUK; R29 | NEW; R30 | NEW; R31 | | | | | | | | 43rd | 270 |
| 2019 | Brad Jones Racing | 14 | Holden ZB Commodore | ADE; R1 | ADE; R2 | MEL; R3 | MEL; R4 | MEL; R5 | MEL; R6 | SYM; R7 | SYM; R8 | PHI; R9 | PHI; R10 | BAR; R11 | BAR; R12 | WIN; R13 | WIN; R14 | HID; R15 | HID; R16 | TOW; R17 | TOW; R18 | QLD; R19 | QLD; R20 | BEN; R21 | BEN; R22 | PUK; R23 | PUK; R24 | BAT; R25; Ret | SUR; R26; 8 | SUR; R27; 17 | SAN; QR; 23 | SAN; R28; 13 | NEW; R29 | NEW; R30 | | | | | | | | | 45th | 266 |

=== Complete Bathurst 1000 results ===
| Year | Team | Car | Co-driver | Position | Laps |
|---|---|---|---|---|---|
| 2013 | Dick Johnson Racing | Ford Falcon FG | (Australia) Tim Blanchard | 15th | 161 |
| 2014 | Dick Johnson Racing | Ford Falcon FG | (Australia) Scott Pye | DNF | 70 |
| 2015 | Erebus Motorsport | Mercedes-Benz E63 AMG | (Australia) Jack Le Brocq | DNF | 135 |
| 2016 | Brad Jones Racing | Holden Commodore VF | (Australia) Tim Slade | 7th | 161 |
| 2017 | Brad Jones Racing | Holden Commodore VF | (Australia) Tim Slade (New Zealand) Andre Heimgartner‡ | 9th | 161 |
| 2018 | Brad Jones Racing | Holden Commodore ZB | (Australia) Tim Slade | 17th | 160 |
| 2019 | Brad Jones Racing | Holden Commodore ZB | (Australia) Tim Slade | DNF | 0 |

‡Walsh was entered as a co-driver to Slade but withdrew and was replaced with Heimgartner.

Awards and achievements
| Preceded by Todd Hazelwood | Mike Kable Young Gun Award; 2015 | Succeeded by Cam Waters |
