= Mercedes-Benz E63 AMG (V8 Supercar) =

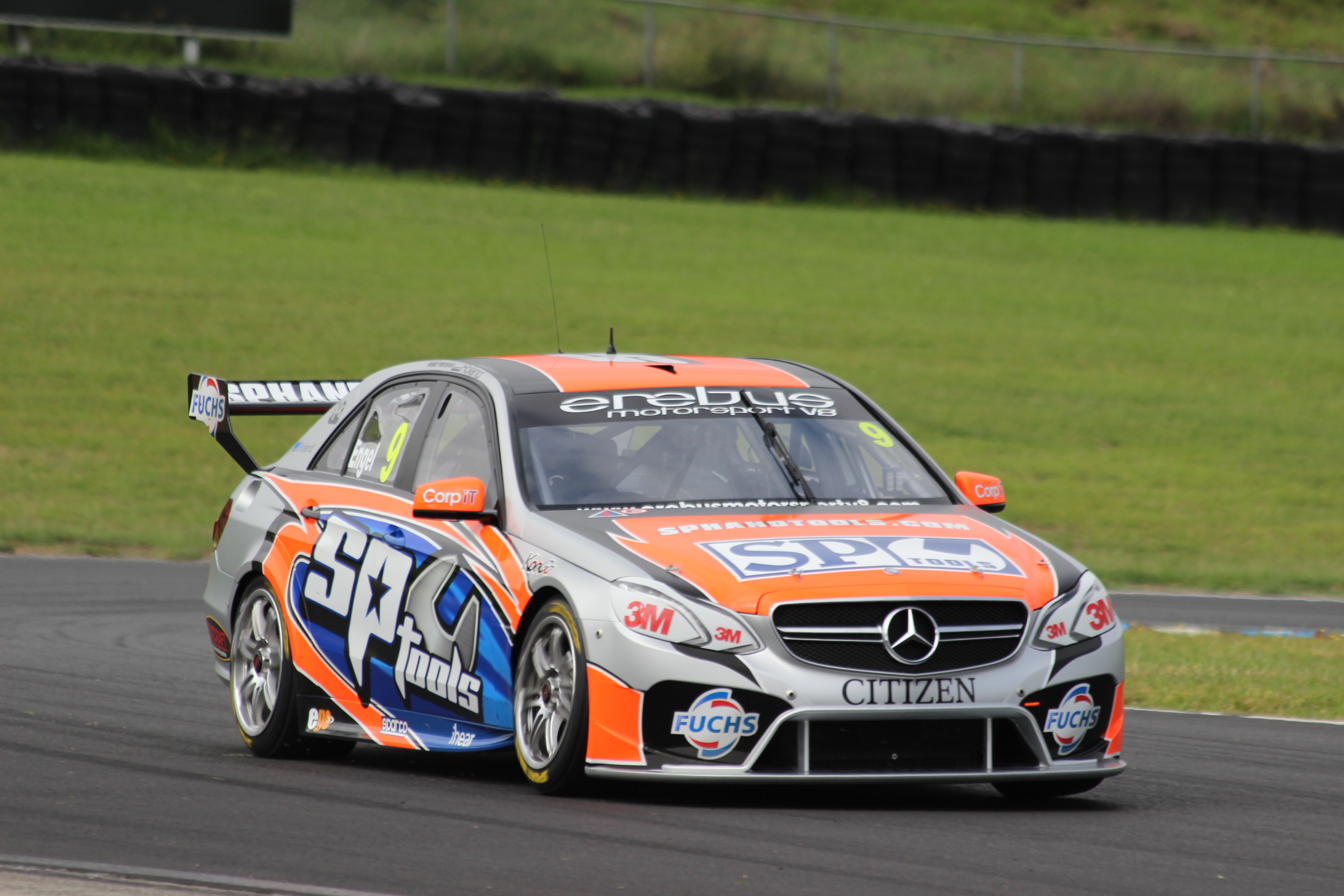
- Maro Engel at the 2013 V8 Supercars pre-season test.
- Category: V8 Supercars
- Constructor: Erebus Motorsport

Technical specifications
- Suspension (front): Double-wishbone
- Suspension (rear): as front
- Length: 4,900 mm (192.9 in)
- Width: 1,800 mm (70.9 in)
- Height: 1,200 mm (47.2 in)
- Wheelbase: 2,822 mm (111.1 in)
- Engine: Mercedes M159 5.0 L (305.1 cu in) V8 (90°) naturally-aspirated, 7,500 RPM limited, front-mounted
- Transmission: Albins transaxle, 6 forward speeds + 1 reverse manual sequential
- Power: 458 kW (623 PS; 614 hp)
- Weight: 1,250 kg (2,755.8 lb)
- Fuel: E85
- Lubricants: Fuchs; Repsol; Penrite
- Brakes: AP Racing 4-piston calipers and discs
- Tyres: Dunlop Sportmaxx, 18" x 11" forged aluminium rims

Competition history
- Notable entrants: Erebus Motorsport; James Rosenberg Racing
- Notable drivers: (Australia) Lee Holdsworth (Germany) Maro Engel (Australia) Tim Slade (Australia) Will Davison (Australia) Ashley Walsh (Australia) Dean Canto (Australia) Alex Davison (New Zealand) Craig Baird (Australia) Steven Johnson (Australia) Andrew Thompson (Australia) David Brabham (Australia) Jack Le Brocq
- Debut: 2013 Adelaide 500
- First win: 2014 Winton 400
- Last win: 2015 Perth SuperSprint
- Last event: 2015 Sydney 500
Entries	Races	Wins	Podiums
42	110	2	3
Poles	F/Laps	Titles	
1	3	0	

The Mercedes-Benz E63 AMG was a silhouette touring car built to compete in the V8 Supercars championship. Based on the Mercedes-AMG E63 W212 road car, the vehicle – designed and assembled by Erebus Motorsport – was constructed to the "Car of the Future" V8 Supercars regulations introduced in 2013, with the car used across the 2013, 2014, and 2015 seasons of Australian touring car racing.

== Background ==
V8 Supercars announced a new regulation set, titled Car of the Future, in 2010 as part of future-proofing discussions. Intended to halve costs through control parts, the series mandated a standardised chassis and roll cage combination designed to attract new manufacturers to compete alongside the existing Holden and Ford products, whilst maintaining the popular 5.0L V8 engines – the base platforms would then be homologated to achieve technical parity, and teams allowed to develop certain components on top of that. The regulation set came into effect in 2013, initially planned to be 2012.

After Nissan's announcement that they would enter the 2013 championship in February 2012, Mercedes-Benz Australia were initially dismissive of following suit – claiming that the category was "not a fit with the Australian and New Zealand brand positioning (of Mercedes-Benz)." However, on 19 September 2012, V8 Supercars announced that the existing Stone Brothers Racing team would merge with Australian GT team Erebus Motorsport and field three Mercedes-badged cars through AMG's Customer Sports Program over the 2013 and 2014 seasons. The deal saw no factory involvement from Mercedes-Benz Australia, with the program being entirely funded by Erebus' billionaire owner Betty Klimenko and existing team sponsors – Mercedes would provide existing hardware which was to then be privately developed and homologated in Australia, and the cars were allowed to feature Mercedes badging but no additional signage (to the point where television broadcasts used the Erebus logo instead of the Mercedes one). Erebus completed a takeover of SBR in January 2013, however Ross Stone remained with the team as general manager.

The Mercedes M159 engine, originally used in the Mercedes-Benz SLS AMG GT3 car, was adopted to the E63 AMG. Originally 6.2L, it was destroked to the category-mandated 5.0L, and – uniquely for V8 Supercars of the period – was initially developed with a flat-plane crank, fly-by-wire throttle, dual butterfly valve intakes and electric power steering.

== Competition history ==
=== 2013 ===
Erebus officially launched the E63 AMG V8 Supercar, as well as their drivers and liveries, at Allphones Arena on 15 February 2013. Lee Holdsworth and Tim Slade in the satellite James Rosenberg Racing car were retained, whilst Mercedes factory driver Maro Engel replaced Shane van Gisbergen; the New Zealander had 'retired' at the end of the previous season and controversially defected to Tekno Autosports, resulting in a legal battle.

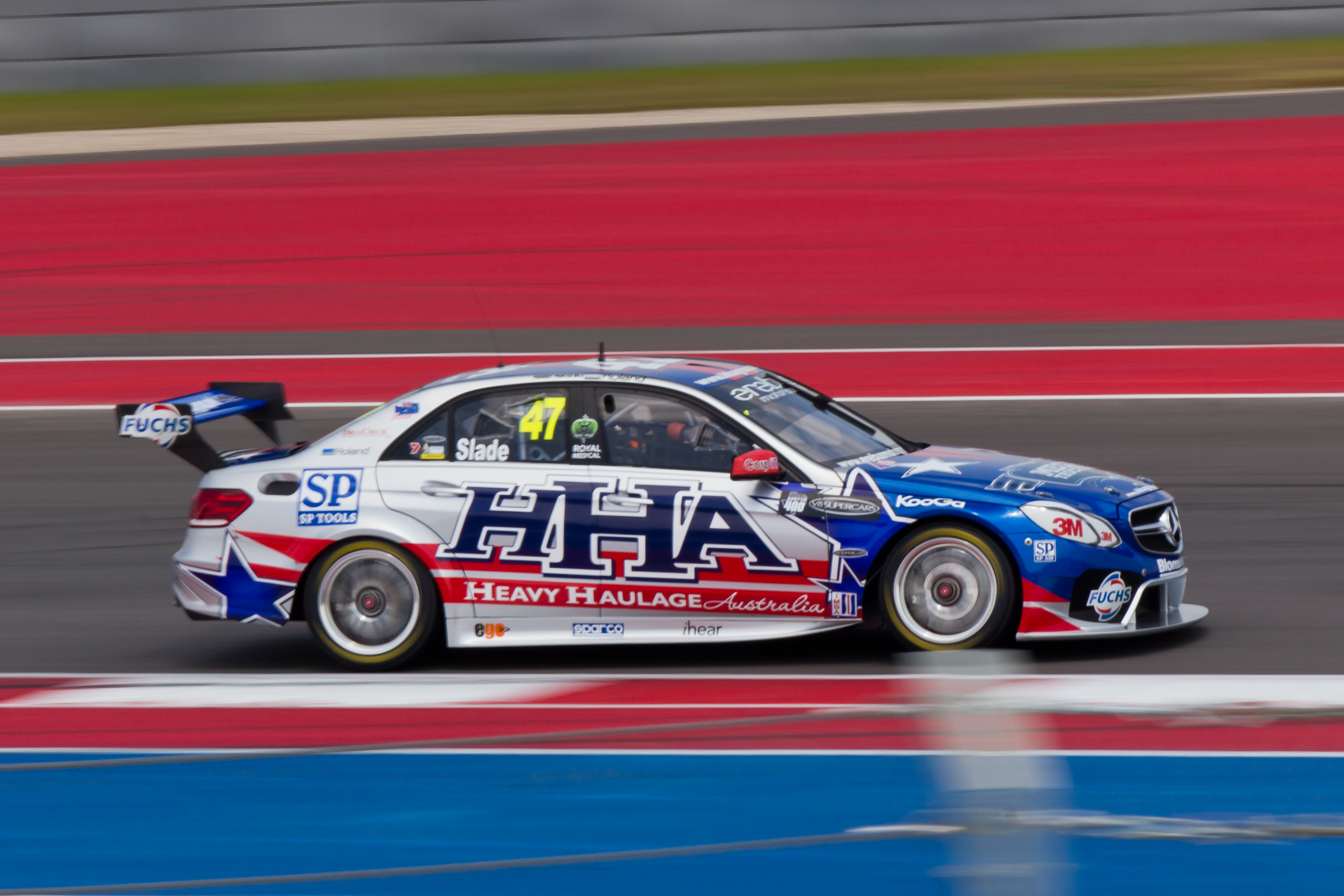
Tim Slade competing in the 2013 Austin 400.

The E63 AMG's tenure began in shaky fashion after Holdsworth suffered a brake failure in the cars' shakedown at Queensland Raceway. Across the pre-season test and the first round in Adelaide, the Mercedes suffered a variety of reliability and ergonomical issues – Holdsworth notably burnt his feet on the pedal box in Adelaide due to excessive heat from the engine bay. The team were granted permission to further test Engel's car at Calder Park Raceway with Craig Baird behind the wheel to troubleshoot electronic issues, before Slade endured two failures related to the engine and driveline at the non-championship Australian Grand Prix event. After a best finish of 13th was achieved across the three cars in all three races at Symmons Plains, Erebus ditched the drive-by-wire and dual throttle butterfly systems for more traditional cable actuation following consultation with AMG and HWA – at Pukekohe, the event after the change was made, all three cars finished all four races albeit no higher than 16th.

Following a rookie test for Engel at Morgan Park Raceway and a development trip for Erebus management to Germany, Engel rewarded the teams' efforts with 9th in qualifying for the first race in Perth. The team spent most of the flyaway round at the Circuit of the Americas outside the top 20, but bounced back after further developmental testing to score two top-ten finishes in Darwin. Holdsworth then went on a streak of five-straight DNFs across the Darwin, Townsville and Ipswich events due to a variety of crashes and mechanical issues, however Slade managed two eighth-place finishes in the same period and had run as high as second in the final race at Queensland Raceway. In a bid to improve parity between the models, V8 Supercars allowed Engel's car and two of the new Nissan Altimas to trial a 70% ethanol blend of fuel at Winton (as opposed to the usual 85%); however, this was reverted after the two Nissans finished 1–2 in the first race of the weekend, despite inconclusive evidence that the alternate blend provided a performance advantage.

Baird, Steven Johnson and Andrew Thompson joined Holdsworth, Engel and Slade for the endurance races. Prior to the Sandown 500, Tobias Mörs – head of vehicle development at Mercedes-AMG – stated that the brand were "unhappy" with the progress of the car, and that the team had to win races for their contract to be renewed at the end of 2014; but conceded that Mercedes had "underestimated everything in the series". On the same day, it was confirmed that Slade would be leaving the team at the conclusion of the season. Holdsworth and Baird responded to the criticism with a fourth-place finish, the best for the car to that point, trailing an ailing Will Davison in the final stint. Mercedes' first Bathurst 1000 since 1994 started badly when both Slade and Thompson crashed their E63 AMG in Thursday practice; Holdsworth and Baird finished the race 14th, Engel and Johnson a lap down in 20th, and Slade and Thompson 24 laps down having coaxed their damaged car through the race. David Brabham replaced Thompson for the final enduro races on the Gold Coast, and was forced to do his driver change in Race 31 through the passenger door after being t-boned by Marc Lieb at the start – Holdsworth and Baird continued the strong form from Sandown, scoring a top-five in Race 31 to end the Enduro Cup standings in 5th behind the Triple 8 and FPR cars.

The team endured a minor slump in the final two events of the season, with Slade finishing a best of 8th and 11th in the final round at Sydney Olympic Park. Holdsworth and Slade finished 20th and 22nd respectively in the drivers' championship, with Engel 28th and last of the full-time competitors – the German was dropped at seasons' end due to budgetary reasons, despite still having a year left on his contract. The two Erebus-entered cars finished 11th in the teams championship, the last of the two-car teams, whilst the James Rosenberg Racing-licensed Slade car was 17th and last of the full-time entries.

=== 2014 ===
Ahead of the 2014 season, the Rosenberg licence shifted to the Walkinshaw Racing stable, reducing the team to two cars. Following the departure of Engel, Will Davison was signed from Ford Performance Racing to join Lee Holdsworth. The livery was launched on the eve of the pre-season test on 14 February; having lost primary sponsors Irwin Tools and SP Tools, both cars adopted black bases with blue highlights and a rolling sponsorship model.

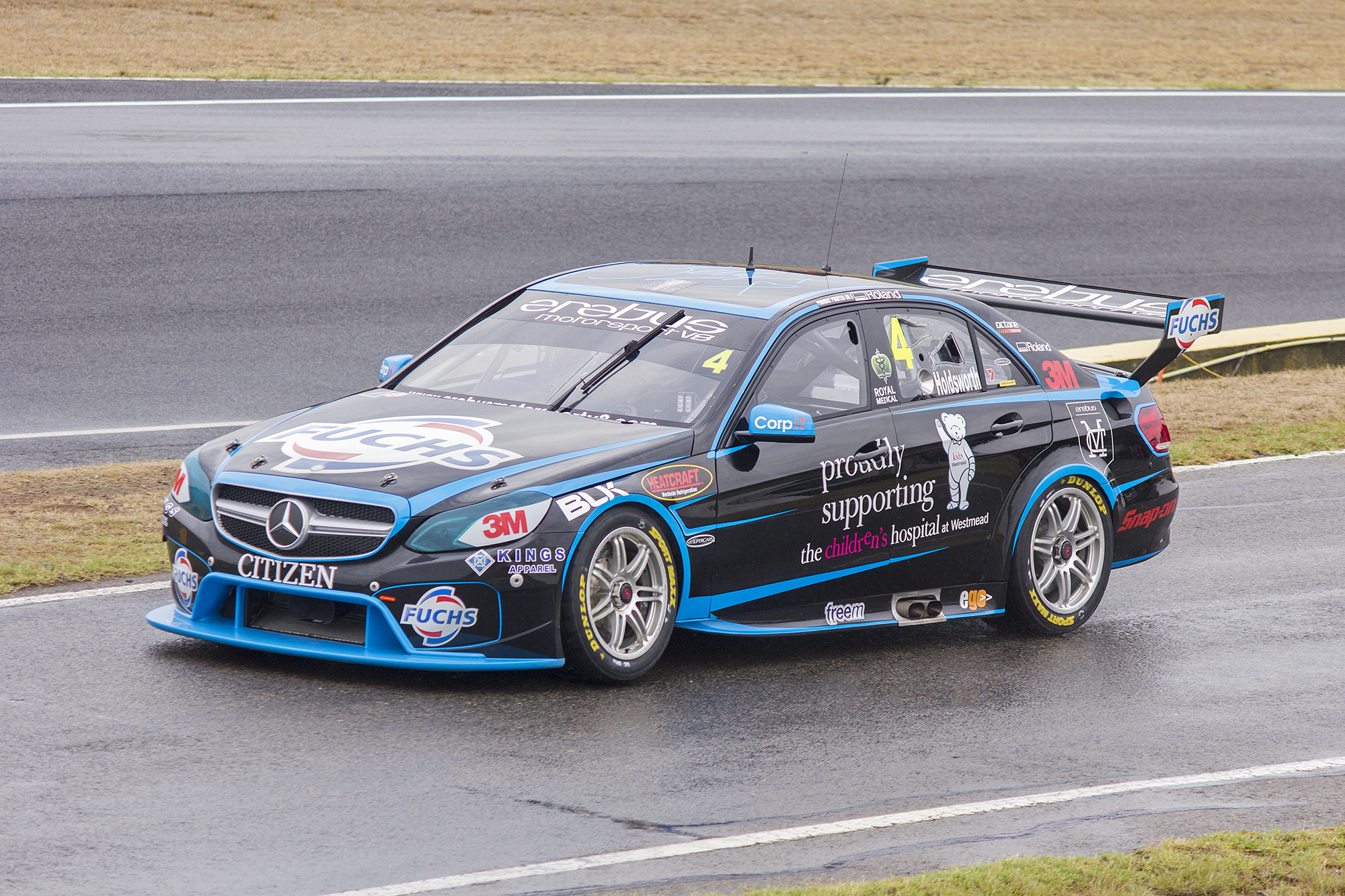
Lee Holdsworth at the 2014 V8 Supercars pre-season test.

Both cars were involved in incidents in the Adelaide season-opener, as Holdsworth collided with James Courtney in Race 2 and Davison crashed heavily at Turn 8 in Race 3. Davison then scored an equal-best fourth-place finish for the car in the third race in Tasmania. In the third round at Winton, Holdsworth overtook Fabian Coulthard late in the second race to take Erebus' and Mercedes' first race win in the ATCC/V8 Supercars. Inconsistent outings followed in Auckland and Perth, before a failed sponsorship deal with Dogecoin led to AMG Customer Sports branding appearing on the cars in Darwin and Townsville – support from Affalterbach that was vindicated after Davison scored his first podium for the team in Race 20. During the mid-portion of the season, Erebus and AMG expressed that "extremely positive" discussions were taking place about extending customer support into 2015, amid speculation that the team were evaluating a switch to Volvo.

Erebus entered the endurance races with an unchanged line-up in Car #4, whilst Davison was joined by his brother Alex – Car #9 came into the Sandown 500 with an upgraded engine and support from appliance manufacturer Beko for the remainder of the season. The team suffered a torrid weekend at Sandown, with Holdsworth walking away from a high-speed crash at the end of the back straight caused by a mechanical failure, whilst the Davison brothers finished down 21st. Holdsworth's car was rebuilt for the Bathurst 1000, but he was involved in another major incident when he was flipped over by the outside tyre wall at Griffins Bend after Russell Ingall crashed into him; the Davison brothers meanwhile finished 4th in a race of fuel strategy caused by Holdsworth's incident. Erebus then had to resurrect a Stone Brothers-built CotF chassis for Holdsworth to race at the Gold Coast, where the two cars could only muster a best result of 11th across the two races. Davison capped off the season with the teams' first pole position at Sydney Olympic Park and a further two top-ten finishes to finish 14th in the standings, whilst Holdsworth ended his tenure with the team 20th having announced his departure prior to the Phillip Island round – Erebus ended the season 7th in the teams' standings, 53pts ahead of the Kelly brothers' Nissans.

=== 2015 ===
Despite not having confirmed an extension of customer support with AMG, Erebus continued using the E63 AMG into 2015. Ashley Walsh, who finished third in the 2014 Dunlop Series, made his main-game debut alongside Davison, whilst Ross Stone left his position as general manager and Campbell Little was brought in as an advisor. The team revealed a majority silver livery with a blue rear-end for both cars ahead of the pre-season test in Sydney, which was later changed to replace the blue with a slightly altered black design – Davison began the season with backing from Solar Australia. The season started badly in Adelaide, as Davison's car shut down during Race 1 and Walsh crashed into Andre Heimgartner a few seconds later; Davison did not start Race 2 with a clutch failure, whilst Walsh also retired from Race 3 with electrical problems.

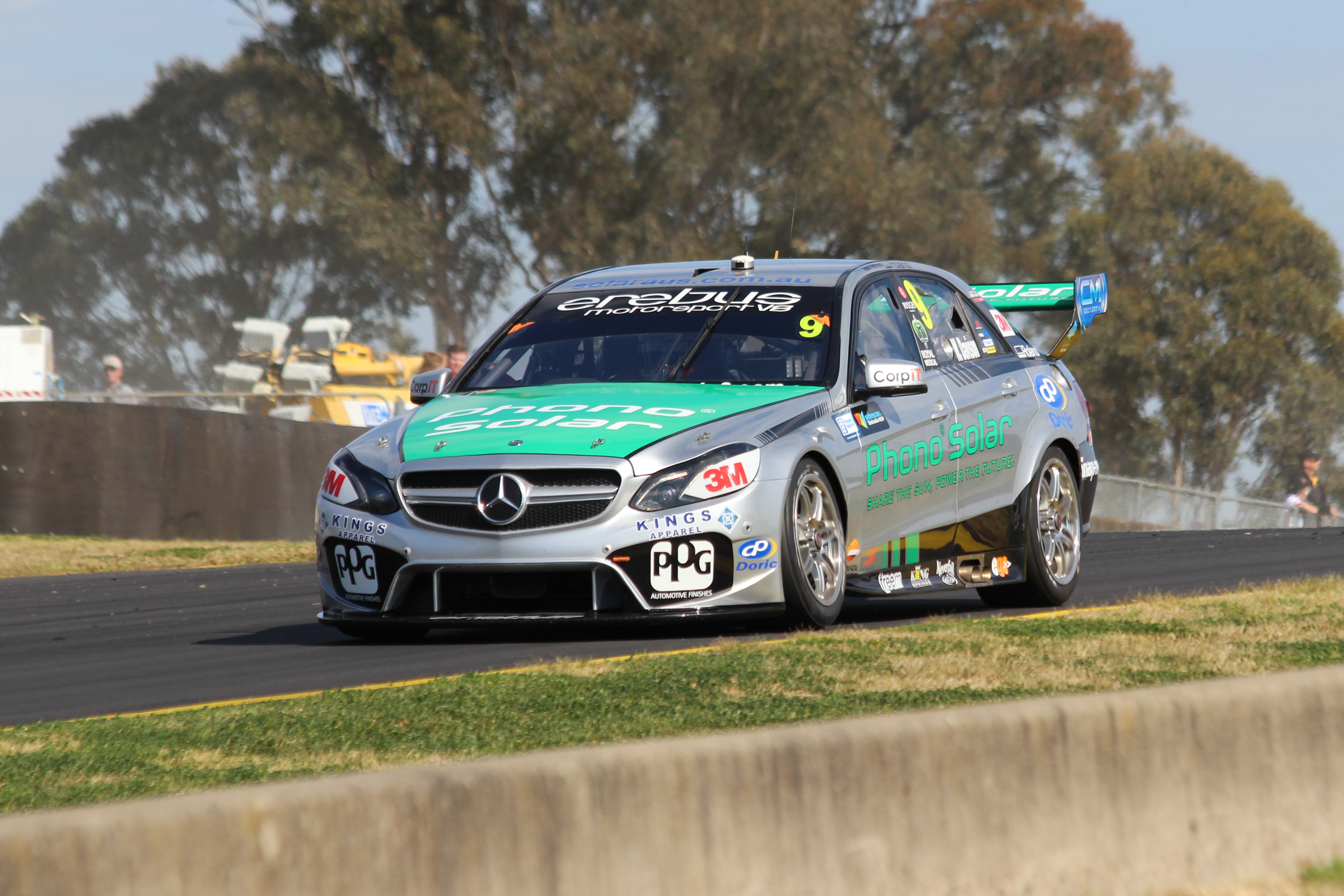
Will Davison competing in the 2015 Sydney SuperSprint.

On 9 March – a week after the Adelaide 500 – Erebus and AMG confirmed that they were not renewing their customer contract, however Erebus planned to keep using the E63 AMG until the end of 2016 using privately developed parts. Davison was turned around by James Courtney in a nose-to-tail collision at the start of the first race in Launceston, leading to a post-race confrontation in which Davison called Courtney "arrogant" and "pathetic". Davison then bounced back to take a surprise race win through tyre strategy in Perth, denying Craig Lowndes of his 100th ATCC/V8 Supercars race win. The E63 then only managed four top-ten finishes across the next 14 races, Davison scoring two seventh-places at Queensland Raceway. In a July 2015 interview, Klimenko claimed that HWA had "loved the idea" of racing in V8 Supercars, but that "the Germans didn’t understand V8 racing" and that personnel changes in Germany "made me bring the whole thing back to Australia."

Entering the Enduro Cup, the team kept the Davison brothers in one car whilst promoting Erebus junior Jack Le Brocq to partner Walsh. Erebus emblazoned their cars with anti-domestic violence messages for Sandown following a spate of incidents in Australia during the preceding week, however Walsh and Le Brocq only managed 19th whilst the Davison brothers finished 7 laps down with a starter motor problem. Prior to Bathurst, both cars gained primary sponsorship for the remainder of the season – Penrite for Car #9 and Wendy's Ice Cream for Car #4, although Penrite covered both cars in New Zealand. The Davison brothers ultimately finished the 1000 in 12th after a mid-race strategy gamble failed, whilst Walsh crashed at the Cutting late in the race. The team then struggled its way to the end of the season, with Davison scoring a best finish of 11th at Sydney Olympic Park – Walsh meanwhile was dropped by Erebus after Pukekohe in favour of experienced drivers to help the development of the E63 AMG; originally Dean Canto for Phillip Island, then Alex Davison for Sydney Olympic Park.

=== Aftermath ===
Will Davison's E63 AMG displayed at the 2026 Adelaide Motorsport Festival, presented in its' 2015 Sydney 500 "retro" livery.

Due to the cost of development and lack of progress, Erebus abandoned the E63 AMGs at the end of the 2015 season and replaced them with Walkinshaw Racing-built Holden Commodore VFs for 2016. The switch coincided with the team moving its V8 Supercar program out of the former Stone Brothers factory in Yatala, Queensland and into their GT base in Melbourne. The Davison brothers left the team, and were replaced with David Reynolds and Aaren Russell.

Four chassis carried the Mercedes body panels and engines; one built by Stone Brothers before the Erebus merger took place, and three by Erebus themselves. Two cars remain in Erebus' workshop with panels minus engines, one was retained as a ride car before being sold in 2022, and the other also became a ride car but converted to Holden Commodore ZB panels whilst retaining the Mercedes M159 engine. Will Davison described the E63 AMG as "a good racecar" that "always needed a better set-up window" and "needed a bit more performance lower in the rev range".

A book on the Erebus team released in 2024 claimed that Mercedes-Benz Asia-Pacific managing director Horst von Sanden sent a scathing document to Mercedes' head office in Germany prior to its rejection of the project in August 2012; Von Sanden allegedly labelled V8 Supercars as a "car-burning, yobbo sport" and that "Mercedes-Benz racing in V8s [w]as a no-win situation". In 2021, Lee Holdsworth confirmed that Erebus had been in line to switch from Mercedes to Volvo for the 2015 season before the deal collapsed at Bathurst, which directly led to him leaving the team.

== Complete V8 Supercars results ==
=== Erebus Motorsport ===
==== No. 4 car ====
V8 Supercars results
Year	Drivers	1	2	3	4	5	6	7	8	9	10	11	12	13	14	15	16	17	18	19	20	21	22	23	24	25	26	27	28	29	30	31	32	33	34	35	36	37	38	Pos.	Pts
2013	(Australia) Lee Holdsworth	ADE; R1; 17	ADE; R2; 17	SYM; R3; 23	SYM; R4; 17	SYM; R5; 13	PUK; R6; 18	PUK; R7; 25	PUK; R8; 17	PUK; R9; 22	BAR; R10; 18	BAR; R11; Ret	BAR; R12; 14	COA; R13; 27	COA; R14; 20	COA; R15; 21	COA; R16; 20	HID; R17; 18	HID; R18; 16	HID; R19; Ret	TOW; R20; Ret	TOW; R21; Ret	QLD; R22; Ret	QLD; R23; Ret	QLD; R24; 18	WIN; R25; 26	WIN; R26; 20	WIN; R27; 20	SAN; R28; 4	BAT; R29; 14	SUR; R30; 12	SUR; R31; 5	PHI; R32; 14	PHI; R33; 17	PHI; R34; Ret	SYD; R35; 23	SYD; R36; 13			20th	1361
2013	(New Zealand) Craig Baird																												SAN; R28; 4	BAT; R29; 14	SUR; R30; 12	SUR; R31; 5								34th	546
2014	(Australia) Lee Holdsworth	ADE; R1; 17	ADE; R2; 17	ADE; R3; 16	SYM; R4; 16	SYM; R5; 9	SYM; R6; 12	WIN; R7; 5	WIN; R8; 1	WIN; R9; 15	PUK; R10; 12	PUK; R11; 14	PUK; R12; 17	PUK; R13; 15	BAR; R14; 5	BAR; R15; 12	BAR; R16; 18	HID; R17; 10	HID; R18; Ret	HID; R19; 12	TOW; R20; 22	TOW; R21; 15	TOW; R22; 15	QLD; R23; 17	QLD; R24; 18	QLD; R25; 23	SMP; R26; 10	SMP; R27; 15	SMP; R28; 13	SAN; R29; Ret	BAT; R30; Ret	SUR; R31; 11	SUR; R32; Ret	PHI; R33; 19	PHI; R34; 20	PHI; R35; 13	SYD; R36; 17	SYD; R37; 24	SYD; R38; 18	20th	1395
2014	(New Zealand) Craig Baird																													SAN; R29; Ret	BAT; R30; Ret	SUR; R31; 11	SUR; R32; Ret							52nd	72
2015	(Australia) Ashley Walsh	ADE; R1; 20	ADE; R2; 8	ADE; R3; Ret	SYM; R4; Ret	SYM; R5; 22	SYM; R6; 21	BAR; R7; 17	BAR; R8; 18	BAR; R9; 22	WIN; R10; 22	WIN; R11; 15	WIN; R12; 22	HID; R13; 21	HID; R14; 20	HID; R15; Ret	TOW; R16; 22	TOW; R17; 23	QLD; R18; 18	QLD; R19; Ret	QLD; R20; 22	SMP; R21; 25	SMP; R22; 16	SMP; R23; 21	SAN; R24; 19	BAT; R25; Ret	SUR; R26; 19	SUR; R27; DSQ	PUK; R28; 20	PUK; R29; 21	PUK; R30; 24									25th	769
2015	(Australia) Jack Le Brocq																								SAN; R24; 19	BAT; R25; Ret	SUR; R26; 19	SUR; R27; DSQ												51st	144
2015	(Australia) Dean Canto																								driver switched teams							PHI; R31; 22	PHI; R32; 25	PHI; R33; 18						28th‡	733‡
2015	(Australia) Alex Davison																								driver switched cars										SYD; R34; 21	SYD; R35; 22	SYD; R36; 15			37th‡	427‡

- ‡ – Includes points scored with other teams/cars.

==== No. 9 car ====
V8 Supercars results
Year	Drivers	1	2	3	4	5	6	7	8	9	10	11	12	13	14	15	16	17	18	19	20	21	22	23	24	25	26	27	28	29	30	31	32	33	34	35	36	37	38	Pos.	Pts
2013	(Germany) Maro Engel	ADE; R1; 24	ADE; R2; Ret	SYM; R3; Ret	SYM; R4; 24	SYM; R5; 23	PUK; R6; 24	PUK; R7; 21	PUK; R8; 20	PUK; R9; 21	BAR; R10; 25	BAR; R11; 26	BAR; R12; Ret	COA; R13; 23	COA; R14; Ret	COA; R15; 24	COA; R16; 25	HID; R17; 16	HID; R18; 22	HID; R19; 9	TOW; R20; 19	TOW; R21; 27	QLD; R22; 19	QLD; R23; 27	QLD; R24; 17	WIN; R25; 18	WIN; R26; 17	WIN; R27; 19	SAN; R28; 25	BAT; R29; 20	SUR; R30; 21	SUR; R31; 22	PHI; R32; 21	PHI; R33; 22	PHI; R34; 19	SYD; R35; Ret	SYD; R36; 20			28th	836
2013	(Australia) Steven Johnson																												SAN; R28; 25	BAT; R29; 20	SUR; R30; 21	SUR; R31; 22								49th	231
2014	(Australia) Will Davison	ADE; R1; 13	ADE; R2; 10	ADE; R3; Ret	SYM; R4; 7	SYM; R5; 23	SYM; R6; 4	WIN; R7; 6	WIN; R8; 8	WIN; R9; 18	PUK; R10; 5	PUK; R11; 18	PUK; R12; 18	PUK; R13; 7	BAR; R14; 7	BAR; R15; 18	BAR; R16; 24	HID; R17; Ret	HID; R18; 13	HID; R19; 16	TOW; R20; 3	TOW; R21; 16	TOW; R22; 10	QLD; R23; 7	QLD; R24; 14	QLD; R25; 18	SMP; R26; 7	SMP; R27; 5	SMP; R28; 11	SAN; R29; 21	BAT; R30; 4	SUR; R31; 20	SUR; R32; 20	PHI; R33; 11	PHI; R34; 14	PHI; R35; 6	SYD; R36; Ret	SYD; R37; 13	SYD; R38; 10	14th	1912
2014	(Australia) Alex Davison																													SAN; R29; 21	BAT; R30; 4	SUR; R31; 20	SUR; R32; 20							37th	414
2015	(Australia) Will Davison	ADE; R1; Ret	ADE; R2; DNS	ADE; R3; 19	SYM; R4; 17	SYM; R5; 7	SYM; R6; 23	BAR; R7; 7	BAR; R8; 9	BAR; R9; 1	WIN; R10; 13	WIN; R11; 7	WIN; R12; 24	HID; R13; 14	HID; R14; 19	HID; R15; 24	TOW; R16; 12	TOW; R17; 24	QLD; R18; 9	QLD; R19; 7	QLD; R20; 7	SMP; R21; 13	SMP; R22; 9	SMP; R23; 20	SAN; R24; 23	BAT; R25; 12	SUR; R26; 15	SUR; R27; 16	PUK; R28; Ret	PUK; R29; 13	PUK; R30; 16	PHI; R31; 15	PHI; R32; 17	PHI; R33; 12	SYD; R34; 13	SYD; R35; 11	SYD; R36; 18			15th	1672
2015	(Australia) Alex Davison																								SAN; R24; 23	BAT; R25; 12	SUR; R26; 15	SUR; R27; 16							driver switched cars					37th‡	427‡

- ‡ – Includes points scored with other cars.

=== James Rosenberg Racing ===
==== No. 47 car ====
V8 Supercars results
Year	Drivers	1	2	3	4	5	6	7	8	9	10	11	12	13	14	15	16	17	18	19	20	21	22	23	24	25	26	27	28	29	30	31	32	33	34	35	36	Pos.	Pts
2013	(Australia) Tim Slade	ADE; R1; 15	ADE; R2; Ret	SYM; R3; 22	SYM; R4; 22	SYM; R5; 18	PUK; R6; 25	PUK; R7; 26	PUK; R8; 16	PUK; R9; 23	BAR; R10; 13	BAR; R11; 23	BAR; R12; 24	COA; R13; 22	COA; R14; 26	COA; R15; 20	COA; R16; 17	HID; R17; 6	HID; R18; 11	HID; R19; Ret	TOW; R20; Ret	TOW; R21; 8	QLD; R22; 24	QLD; R23; 13	QLD; R24; 8	WIN; R25; 22	WIN; R26; 19	WIN; R27; 15	SAN; R28; 21	BAT; R29; 26	SUR; R30; 15	SUR; R31; 20	PHI; R32; 25	PHI; R33; 24	PHI; R34; 20	SYD; R35; 8	SYD; R36; 11	22nd	1298
2013	(Australia) Andrew Thompson																												SAN; R28; 21	BAT; R29; 26								58th	138
2013	(Australia) David Brabham																														SUR; R30; 15	SUR; R31; 20						59th	105

== In popular culture ==
The Mercedes-Benz E63 AMG V8 Supercar appeared as a playable vehicle in Forza Motorsport 6 and Forza Motorsport 7 alongside other V8 Supercar models from the 2015 and 2017 seasons respectively.

== See also ==
- Volvo S60 (V8 Supercar)
