= 2015 Townsville 400 =

2015 V8 Supercar championship race

(Queensland) 2015 Castrol Edge Townsville 400
Event Information
- Round 6 of 14 in the 2015 International V8 Supercars Championship
- Date: 10–12 July 2015
- Location: Townsville, Queensland
- Venue: Townsville Street Circuit
- Weather: Fine

Results
Race 1
Distance	70 laps	200 km
Pole position	Chaz Mostert; Prodrive Racing Australia	1:12.8663
Winner	Mark Winterbottom; Prodrive Racing Australia	1:29:22.5674
Race 2
Distance	70 laps	200 km
Pole position	Scott McLaughlin; Garry Rogers Motorsport	1:13.4117
Winner	Mark Winterbottom; Prodrive Racing Australia	1:30:50.2573

The 2015 Castrol Edge Townsville 400 was a motor race for V8 Supercars held on the weekend of 10–12 July 2015. The event was held at the Townsville Street Circuit in Townsville, Queensland, and consisted of two races, each over a distance of 200 kilometres (124 miles). It was the sixth round of fourteen in the 2015 V8 Supercars Championship.

== Results ==
=== Race 16 ===
Pos.	No.	Driver	Car	Team	Laps	Time/Retired	Grid	Points
1	5	(Australia) Mark Winterbottom	Ford FG X Falcon	Prodrive Racing Australia	70	1:29:22.5674	2	150
2	55	(Australia) David Reynolds	Ford FG X Falcon	Rod Nash Racing	70	+0.3 s	3	138
3	14	(New Zealand) Fabian Coulthard	Holden VF Commodore	Brad Jones Racing	70	+1.5 s	8	129
4	33	(New Zealand) Scott McLaughlin	Volvo S60	Garry Rogers Motorsport	70	+7.0 s	4	120
5	17	(Australia) Scott Pye	Ford FG X Falcon	DJR Team Penske	70	+7.7 s	5	111
6	22	(Australia) James Courtney	Holden VF Commodore	Holden Racing Team	70	+11.7 s	7	102
7	2	(Australia) Garth Tander	Holden VF Commodore	Holden Racing Team	70	+15.9 s	14	96
8	6	(Australia) Chaz Mostert	Ford FG X Falcon	Prodrive Racing Australia	70	+20.5 s	1	90
9	1	(Australia) Jamie Whincup	Holden VF Commodore	Triple Eight Race Engineering	70	+21.6 s	6	84
10	97	(New Zealand) Shane van Gisbergen	Holden VF Commodore	Tekno Autosports	70	+23.0 s	25	78
11	99	(Australia) James Moffat	Nissan Altima L33	Nissan Motorsport	70	+23.6 s	11	72
12	9	(Australia) Will Davison	Mercedes-Benz E63 AMG	Erebus Motorsport	70	+24.6 s	10	69
13	18	(Australia) Lee Holdsworth	Holden VF Commodore	Charlie Schwerkolt Racing	70	+43.2 s	20	66
14	888	(Australia) Craig Lowndes	Holden VF Commodore	Triple Eight Race Engineering	70	+44.1 s	13	63
15	23	(Australia) Michael Caruso	Nissan Altima L33	Nissan Motorsport	70	+44.9 s	18	60
16	15	(Australia) Rick Kelly	Nissan Altima L33	Nissan Motorsport	70	+46.7 s	16	57
17	7	(Australia) Todd Kelly	Nissan Altima L33	Nissan Motorsport	70	+47.2 s	17	54
18	34	(Australia) David Wall	Volvo S60	Garry Rogers Motorsport	70	+54.1 s	19	51
19	500	(Australia) Jason Bright	Holden VF Commodore	Brad Jones Racing	70	+59.8 s	9	48
20	47	(Australia) Tim Slade	Holden VF Commodore	Walkinshaw Racing	70	+65.0 s	21	45
21	3	(Australia) Tim Blanchard	Holden VF Commodore	Lucas Dumbrell Motorsport	69	+1 lap	24	42
22	4	(Australia) Ashley Walsh	Mercedes-Benz E63 AMG	Erebus Motorsport	69	+1 lap	23	39
23	111	(New Zealand) Andre Heimgartner	Ford FG X Falcon	Super Black Racing	65	+5 laps	12	36
24	21	(Australia) Dale Wood	Holden VF Commodore	Britek Motorsport	64	+6 laps	22	33
DNF	222	(Australia) Nick Percat	Holden VF Commodore	Lucas Dumbrell Motorsport	57		15	

=== Race 17 ===
Pos.	No.	Driver	Car	Team	Laps	Time/Retired	Grid	Points
1	5	(Australia) Mark Winterbottom	Ford FG X Falcon	Prodrive Racing Australia	70	1:30:50.2573	5	150
2	22	(Australia) James Courtney	Holden VF Commodore	Holden Racing Team	70	+2.9 s	16	138
3	55	(Australia) David Reynolds	Ford FG X Falcon	Rod Nash Racing	70	+6.2 s	4	129
4	2	(Australia) Garth Tander	Holden VF Commodore	Holden Racing Team	70	+10.4 s	11	120
5	1	(Australia) Jamie Whincup	Holden VF Commodore	Triple Eight Race Engineering	70	+14.2 s	13	111
6	6	(Australia) Chaz Mostert	Ford FG X Falcon	Prodrive Racing Australia	70	+15.3 s	2	102
7	18	(Australia) Lee Holdsworth	Holden VF Commodore	Charlie Schwerkolt Racing	70	+15.7 s	9	96
8	111	(New Zealand) Andre Heimgartner	Ford FG X Falcon	Super Black Racing	70	+17.0 s	7	90
9	888	(Australia) Craig Lowndes	Holden VF Commodore	Triple Eight Race Engineering	70	+20.3 s	23	84
10	7	(Australia) Todd Kelly	Nissan Altima L33	Nissan Motorsport	70	+23.3 s	8	78
11	23	(Australia) Michael Caruso	Nissan Altima L33	Nissan Motorsport	70	+24.2 s	12	72
12	500	(Australia) Jason Bright	Holden VF Commodore	Brad Jones Racing	70	+24.5 s	14	69
13	14	(New Zealand) Fabian Coulthard	Holden VF Commodore	Brad Jones Racing	70	+26.5 s	6	66
14	47	(Australia) Tim Slade	Holden VF Commodore	Walkinshaw Racing	70	+27.2 s	15	63
15	222	(Australia) Nick Percat	Holden VF Commodore	Lucas Dumbrell Motorsport	70	+31.4 s	19	60
16	15	(Australia) Rick Kelly	Nissan Altima L33	Nissan Motorsport	70	+31.7 s	18	57
17	99	(Australia) James Moffat	Nissan Altima L33	Nissan Motorsport	70	+34.1 s	24	54
18	21	(Australia) Dale Wood	Holden VF Commodore	Britek Motorsport	70	+34.7 s	20	51
19	17	(Australia) Scott Pye	Ford FG X Falcon	DJR Team Penske	70	+36.1 s	17	48
20	97	(New Zealand) Shane van Gisbergen	Holden VF Commodore	Tekno Autosports	70	+43.4 s	3	45
21	3	(Australia) Tim Blanchard	Holden VF Commodore	Lucas Dumbrell Motorsport	70	+46.0 s	25	42
22	34	(Australia) David Wall	Volvo S60	Garry Rogers Motorsport	70	+63.1 s	21	39
23	4	(Australia) Ashley Walsh	Mercedes-Benz E63 AMG	Erebus Motorsport	70	+70.9 s	22	36
24	9	(Australia) Will Davison	Mercedes-Benz E63 AMG	Erebus Motorsport	69	+1 lap	10	33
DNF	33	(New Zealand) Scott McLaughlin	Volvo S60	Garry Rogers Motorsport	19		1	
