= 2015 Tasmania Super Sprint =

2015 V8 Supercar championship race

2015 Tyrepower Tasmania Super Sprint
Event Information
- Round 2 of 14 in the 2015 International V8 Supercars Championship
- Date: 27–29 March 2015
- Location: Launceston, Tasmania
- Venue: Symmons Plains Raceway
- Weather: Fine

Results
Race 1
Distance	25 laps	60 km
Pole position	Craig Lowndes; Triple Eight Race Engineering	51.6558
Winner	Craig Lowndes; Triple Eight Race Engineering	22:01.3121
Race 2
Distance	25 laps	60 km
Pole position	Craig Lowndes; Triple Eight Race Engineering	51.6213
Winner	Craig Lowndes; Triple Eight Race Engineering	24:24.0674
Race 3
Distance	84 laps	200 km
Pole position	Craig Lowndes; Triple Eight Race Engineering	51.7978
Winner	Jamie Whincup; Triple Eight Race Engineering	1:15:21.0174

The 2015 Tyrepower Tasmania Super Sprint was a motor race for V8 Supercars held on the weekend of 27–29 March 2015. The event was held at the Symmons Plains Raceway in Launceston, Tasmania, and consisted of two sprint races, each over a distance of 60 kilometres (37 miles) and one endurance race over a distance of 200 kilometres (124 miles). It was the second round of fourteen in the 2015 International V8 Supercars Championship.

Prior to the start of the event, DJR Team Penske's Marcos Ambrose decided to step down from the driver's seat. He announced that he will work with the team and further practice with the car before he returns for the Endurance Cup. Scott Pye, who raced for the team in 2014, was announced as the replacement for Ambrose. David Reynolds and Andre Heimgartner transferred over to the Ford FG X Falcon for the event and the rest of the 2015 season.

Saturday was a good day for Triple Eight Race Engineering's Craig Lowndes, who managed to secure pole position for both races to be held later in the day. Lowndes then proceeded to win the first race of the weekend, ahead of Mark Winterbottom and James Courtney. Erebus Motorsport's Will Davison, who started fourth on the grid, missed out on a potential podium finish after being spun around by Courtney at turn 4 on the first lap. After Davison commented that Courtney's performance was 'stupid' and 'arrogant', no further action on the incident was decided by the race stewards. Lowndes again led home the field in Race 5, ahead of teammate Jamie Whincup.

Lowndes took a clean sweep of pole positions on Sunday taking pole for the 200 km (124 mi) Race 6, alongside Reynolds. The two managed to tangle at turn 2 on the first lap; Lowndes received a pit lane penalty for spinning Reynolds around in the incident. Whincup took the lead and led until the finish line. Chaz Mostert finished second and Shane van Gisbergen finished third. The two wins for Lowndes meant that he moved to 99 ATCC/V8 Supercar wins in his career, while Whincup moved into second place on the all-time wins list with 91, passing Mark Skaife's tally of 90 wins.

== Results ==
=== Race 4 ===
==== Qualifying ====
Pos.	No.	Driver	Car	Team	Time
1	888	(Australia) Craig Lowndes	Holden VF Commodore	Triple Eight Race Engineering	0:51.6558
2	5	(Australia) Mark Winterbottom	Ford FG X Falcon	Prodrive Racing Australia	0:51.7030
3	22	(Australia) James Courtney	Holden VF Commodore	Holden Racing Team	0:51.7675
4	9	(Australia) Will Davison	Mercedes-Benz E63 AMG	Erebus Motorsport	0:51.7889
5	55	(Australia) David Reynolds	Ford FG X Falcon	Rod Nash Racing	0:51.7942
6	97	(New Zealand) Shane van Gisbergen	Holden VF Commodore	Tekno Autosports	0:51.8378
7	6	(Australia) Chaz Mostert	Ford FG X Falcon	Prodrive Racing Australia	0:51.8875
8	1	(Australia) Jamie Whincup	Holden VF Commodore	Triple Eight Race Engineering	0:51.9057
9	2	(Australia) Garth Tander	Holden VF Commodore	Holden Racing Team	0:51.9852
10	300	(Australia) Tim Slade	Holden VF Commodore	Walkinshaw Racing	0:52.0973
11	111	(New Zealand) Andre Heimgartner	Ford FG X Falcon	Super Black Racing	0:52.1210
12	7	(Australia) Todd Kelly	Nissan Altima L33	Nissan Motorsport	0:52.1442
13	14	(New Zealand) Fabian Coulthard	Holden VF Commodore	Brad Jones Racing	0:52.1596
14	18	(Australia) Lee Holdsworth	Holden VF Commodore	Charlie Schwerkolt Racing	0:52.1926
15	17	(Australia) Scott Pye	Ford FG X Falcon	DJR Team Penske	0:52.1959
16	99	(Australia) James Moffat	Nissan Altima L33	Nissan Motorsport	0:52.2040
17	33	(New Zealand) Scott McLaughlin	Volvo S60	Garry Rogers Motorsport	0:52.2061
18	21	(Australia) Dale Wood	Holden VF Commodore	Britek Motorsport	0:52.2363
19	15	(Australia) Rick Kelly	Nissan Altima L33	Nissan Motorsport	0:52.2420
20	4	(Australia) Ashley Walsh	Mercedes-Benz E63 AMG	Erebus Motorsport	0:52.2641
21	23	(Australia) Michael Caruso	Nissan Altima L33	Nissan Motorsport	0:52.2727
22	8	(Australia) Jason Bright	Holden VF Commodore	Brad Jones Racing	0:52.2829
23	222	(Australia) Nick Percat	Holden VF Commodore	Lucas Dumbrell Motorsport	0:52.3908
24	34	(Australia) David Wall	Volvo S60	Garry Rogers Motorsport	0:52.4557
25	3	(Australia) Tim Blanchard	Holden VF Commodore	Lucas Dumbrell Motorsport	0:52.6047

==== Race ====
Pos.	No.	Driver	Car	Team	Laps	Time/Retired	Grid	Points
1	888	(Australia) Craig Lowndes	Holden VF Commodore	Triple Eight Race Engineering	25	22:01.3121	1	75
2	5	(Australia) Mark Winterbottom	Ford FG X Falcon	Prodrive Racing Australia	25	+2.2 s	2	69
3	22	(Australia) James Courtney	Holden VF Commodore	Holden Racing Team	25	+3.0 s	3	64
4	97	(New Zealand) Shane van Gisbergen	Holden VF Commodore	Tekno Autosports	25	+8.4 s	8	60
5	6	(Australia) Chaz Mostert	Ford FG X Falcon	Prodrive Racing Australia	25	+8.8 s	6	55
6	55	(Australia) David Reynolds	Ford FG X Falcon	Rod Nash Racing	25	+9.8 s	5	51
7	1	(Australia) Jamie Whincup	Holden VF Commodore	Triple Eight Race Engineering	25	+10.0 s	7	48
8	2	(Australia) Garth Tander	Holden VF Commodore	Holden Racing Team	25	+10.9 s	9	45
9	300	(Australia) Tim Slade	Holden VF Commodore	Walkinshaw Racing	25	+13.3 s	10	42
10	14	(New Zealand) Fabian Coulthard	Holden VF Commodore	Brad Jones Racing	25	+14.0 s	13	39
11	111	(New Zealand) Andre Heimgartner	Ford FG X Falcon	Super Black Racing	25	+15.9 s	11	36
12	99	(Australia) James Moffat	Nissan Altima L33	Nissan Motorsport	25	+18.0 s	16	34
13	21	(Australia) Dale Wood	Holden VF Commodore	Britek Motorsport	25	+21.5 s	18	33
14	15	(Australia) Rick Kelly	Nissan Altima L33	Nissan Motorsport	25	+23.4 s	19	31
15	23	(Australia) Michael Caruso	Nissan Altima L33	Nissan Motorsport	25	+26.1 s	21	30
16	222	(Australia) Nick Percat	Holden VF Commodore	Lucas Dumbrell Motorsport	25	+27.3 s	23	28
17	9	(Australia) Will Davison	Mercedes-Benz E63 AMG	Erebus Motorsport	25	+27.5 s	4	27
18	17	(Australia) Scott Pye	Ford FG X Falcon	DJR Team Penske	25	+28.5 s	15	25
19	8	(Australia) Jason Bright	Holden VF Commodore	Brad Jones Racing	25	+29.5 s	22	24
20	34	(Australia) David Wall	Volvo S60	Garry Rogers Motorsport	25	+31.6 s	24	22
21	3	(Australia) Tim Blanchard	Holden VF Commodore	Lucas Dumbrell Motorsport	25	+34.9 s	25	21
22	18	(Australia) Lee Holdsworth	Holden VF Commodore	Charlie Schwerkolt Racing	25	+42.8 s	14	19
23	7	(Australia) Todd Kelly	Nissan Altima L33	Nissan Motorsport	25	+48.4 s	12	18
DNF	4	(Australia) Ashley Walsh	Mercedes-Benz E63 AMG	Erebus Motorsport	11		20	
DNF	33	(New Zealand) Scott McLaughlin	Volvo S60	Garry Rogers Motorsport	0		17	

=== Race 5 ===
==== Qualifying ====
Pos.	No.	Driver	Car	Team	Time
1	888	(Australia) Craig Lowndes	Holden VF Commodore	Triple Eight Race Engineering	0:51.6213
2	1	(Australia) Jamie Whincup	Holden VF Commodore	Triple Eight Race Engineering	0:51.7188
3	22	(Australia) James Courtney	Holden VF Commodore	Holden Racing Team	0:51.7550
4	55	(Australia) David Reynolds	Ford FG X Falcon	Rod Nash Racing	0:51.8263
5	111	(New Zealand) Andre Heimgartner	Ford FG X Falcon	Super Black Racing	0:51.8336
6	2	(Australia) Garth Tander	Holden VF Commodore	Holden Racing Team	0:51.8663
7	5	(Australia) Mark Winterbottom	Ford FG X Falcon	Prodrive Racing Australia	0:51.8817
8	33	(New Zealand) Scott McLaughlin	Volvo S60	Garry Rogers Motorsport	0:51.9132
9	9	(Australia) Will Davison	Mercedes-Benz E63 AMG	Erebus Motorsport	0:51.9332
10	97	(New Zealand) Shane van Gisbergen	Holden VF Commodore	Tekno Autosports	0:51.9398
11	18	(Australia) Lee Holdsworth	Holden VF Commodore	Charlie Schwerkolt Racing	0:51.9442
12	7	(Australia) Todd Kelly	Nissan Altima L33	Nissan Motorsport	0:51.9518
13	14	(New Zealand) Fabian Coulthard	Holden VF Commodore	Brad Jones Racing	0:51.9520
14	6	(Australia) Chaz Mostert	Ford FG X Falcon	Prodrive Racing Australia	0:51.9531
15	300	(Australia) Tim Slade	Holden VF Commodore	Walkinshaw Racing	0:51.9663
16	15	(Australia) Rick Kelly	Nissan Altima L33	Nissan Motorsport	0:52.0023
17	8	(Australia) Jason Bright	Holden VF Commodore	Brad Jones Racing	0:52.0702
18	17	(Australia) Scott Pye	Ford FG X Falcon	DJR Team Penske	0:52.1055
19	21	(Australia) Dale Wood	Holden VF Commodore	Britek Motorsport	0:52.1556
20	4	(Australia) Ashley Walsh	Mercedes-Benz E63 AMG	Erebus Motorsport	0:52.2204
21	99	(Australia) James Moffat	Nissan Altima L33	Nissan Motorsport	0:52.2912
22	222	(Australia) Nick Percat	Holden VF Commodore	Lucas Dumbrell Motorsport	0:52.3292
23	23	(Australia) Michael Caruso	Nissan Altima L33	Nissan Motorsport	0:52.3578
24	34	(Australia) David Wall	Volvo S60	Garry Rogers Motorsport	0:52.4435
25	3	(Australia) Tim Blanchard	Holden VF Commodore	Lucas Dumbrell Motorsport	0:52.5512

==== Race ====
Pos.	No.	Driver	Car	Team	Laps	Time/Retired	Grid	Points
1	888	(Australia) Craig Lowndes	Holden VF Commodore	Triple Eight Race Engineering	25	24:24.0674	1	75
2	1	(Australia) Jamie Whincup	Holden VF Commodore	Triple Eight Race Engineering	25	+1.6 s	2	69
3	22	(Australia) James Courtney	Holden VF Commodore	Holden Racing Team	25	+5.5 s	3	64
4	55	(Australia) David Reynolds	Ford FG X Falcon	Rod Nash Racing	25	+7.5 s	4	60
5	2	(Australia) Garth Tander	Holden VF Commodore	Holden Racing Team	25	+8.6 s	6	55
6	5	(Australia) Mark Winterbottom	Ford FG X Falcon	Prodrive Racing Australia	25	+9.1 s	7	51
7	9	(Australia) Will Davison	Mercedes-Benz E63 AMG	Erebus Motorsport	25	+9.6 s	9	48
8	97	(New Zealand) Shane van Gisbergen	Holden VF Commodore	Tekno Autosports	25	+10.2 s	10	45
9	33	(New Zealand) Scott McLaughlin	Volvo S60	Garry Rogers Motorsport	25	+12.6 s	8	42
10	14	(New Zealand) Fabian Coulthard	Holden VF Commodore	Brad Jones Racing	25	+13.2 s	13	39
11	18	(Australia) Lee Holdsworth	Holden VF Commodore	Charlie Schwerkolt Racing	25	+13.7 s	11	36
12	6	(Australia) Chaz Mostert	Ford FG X Falcon	Prodrive Racing Australia	25	+14.1 s	14	34
13	7	(Australia) Todd Kelly	Nissan Altima L33	Nissan Motorsport	25	+16.7 s	12	33
14	300	(Australia) Tim Slade	Holden VF Commodore	Walkinshaw Racing	25	+17.1 s	15	31
15	8	(Australia) Jason Bright	Holden VF Commodore	Brad Jones Racing	25	+18.5 s	17	30
16	15	(Australia) Rick Kelly	Nissan Altima L33	Nissan Motorsport	25	+20.6 s	16	28
17	17	(Australia) Scott Pye	Ford FG X Falcon	DJR Team Penske	25	+21.1 s	18	27
18	222	(Australia) Nick Percat	Holden VF Commodore	Lucas Dumbrell Motorsport	25	+21.5 s	22	25
19	99	(Australia) James Moffat	Nissan Altima L33	Nissan Motorsport	25	+22.3 s	21	24
20	34	(Australia) David Wall	Volvo S60	Garry Rogers Motorsport	25	+25.2 s	24	22
21	3	(Australia) Tim Blanchard	Holden VF Commodore	Lucas Dumbrell Motorsport	25	+27.1 s	25	21
22	4	(Australia) Ashley Walsh	Mercedes-Benz E63 AMG	Erebus Motorsport	25	+32.9 s	20	19
23	23	(Australia) Michael Caruso	Nissan Altima L33	Nissan Motorsport	25	+35.0 s	23	18
24	21	(Australia) Dale Wood	Holden VF Commodore	Britek Motorsport	24	+1 lap	19	16
25	111	(New Zealand) Andre Heimgartner	Ford FG X Falcon	Super Black Racing	23	+2 laps	5	15

=== Race 6 ===
==== Qualifying ====
Pos.	No.	Driver	Car	Team	Time
1	888	(Australia) Craig Lowndes	Holden VF Commodore	Triple Eight Race Engineering	0:51.7978
2	55	(Australia) David Reynolds	Ford FG X Falcon	Rod Nash Racing	0:51.8463
3	1	(Australia) Jamie Whincup	Holden VF Commodore	Triple Eight Race Engineering	0:51.8532
4	9	(Australia) Will Davison	Mercedes-Benz E63 AMG	Erebus Motorsport	0:51.9062
5	97	(New Zealand) Shane van Gisbergen	Holden VF Commodore	Tekno Autosports	0:51.9125
6	6	(Australia) Chaz Mostert	Ford FG X Falcon	Prodrive Racing Australia	0:52.0099
7	111	(New Zealand) Andre Heimgartner	Ford FG X Falcon	Super Black Racing	0:52.0172
8	2	(Australia) Garth Tander	Holden VF Commodore	Holden Racing Team	0:52.0219
9	5	(Australia) Mark Winterbottom	Ford FG X Falcon	Prodrive Racing Australia	0:52.0668
10	8	(Australia) Jason Bright	Holden VF Commodore	Brad Jones Racing	0:52.0972
11	33	(New Zealand) Scott McLaughlin	Volvo S60	Garry Rogers Motorsport	0:52.1461
12	22	(Australia) James Courtney	Holden VF Commodore	Holden Racing Team	0:52.1899
13	21	(Australia) Dale Wood	Holden VF Commodore	Britek Motorsport	0:52.1906
14	14	(New Zealand) Fabian Coulthard	Holden VF Commodore	Brad Jones Racing	0:52.1991
15	18	(Australia) Lee Holdsworth	Holden VF Commodore	Charlie Schwerkolt Racing	0:52.2249
16	300	(Australia) Tim Slade	Holden VF Commodore	Walkinshaw Racing	0:52.2454
17	222	(Australia) Nick Percat	Holden VF Commodore	Lucas Dumbrell Motorsport	0:52.2502
18	4	(Australia) Ashley Walsh	Mercedes-Benz E63 AMG	Erebus Motorsport	0:52.2516
19	15	(Australia) Rick Kelly	Nissan Altima L33	Nissan Motorsport	0:52.2945
20	7	(Australia) Todd Kelly	Nissan Altima L33	Nissan Motorsport	0:52.3503
21	17	(Australia) Scott Pye	Ford FG X Falcon	DJR Team Penske	0:52.3642
22	99	(Australia) James Moffat	Nissan Altima L33	Nissan Motorsport	0:52.3730
23	34	(Australia) David Wall	Volvo S60	Garry Rogers Motorsport	0:52.3898
24	23	(Australia) Michael Caruso	Nissan Altima L33	Nissan Motorsport	0:52.3929
25	3	(Australia) Tim Blanchard	Holden VF Commodore	Lucas Dumbrell Motorsport	0:52.9913

==== Race ====
Pos.	No.	Driver	Car	Team	Laps	Time/Retired	Grid	Points
1	1	(Australia) Jamie Whincup	Holden VF Commodore	Triple Eight Race Engineering	84	1:15:21.0176	3	150
2	6	(Australia) Chaz Mostert	Ford FG X Falcon	Prodrive Racing Australia	84	+3.5 s	6	138
3	97	(New Zealand) Shane van Gisbergen	Holden VF Commodore	Tekno Autosports	84	+15.3 s	5	129
4	2	(Australia) Garth Tander	Holden VF Commodore	Holden Racing Team	84	+15.9 s	8	120
5	5	(Australia) Mark Winterbottom	Ford FG X Falcon	Prodrive Racing Australia	84	+24.5 s	9	111
6	888	(Australia) Craig Lowndes	Holden VF Commodore	Triple Eight Race Engineering	84	+26.9 s	1	102
7	33	(New Zealand) Scott McLaughlin	Volvo S60	Garry Rogers Motorsport	84	+28.0 s	11	96
8	111	(New Zealand) Andre Heimgartner	Ford FG X Falcon	Super Black Racing	84	+31.6 s	7	90
9	14	(New Zealand) Fabian Coulthard	Holden VF Commodore	Brad Jones Racing	84	+32.2 s	14	84
10	22	(Australia) James Courtney	Holden VF Commodore	Holden Racing Team	84	+40.4 s	12	78
11	55	(Australia) David Reynolds	Ford FG X Falcon	Rod Nash Racing	84	+41.0 s	2	72
12	8	(Australia) Jason Bright	Holden VF Commodore	Brad Jones Racing	84	+52.2 s	10	69
13	7	(Australia) Todd Kelly	Nissan Altima L33	Nissan Motorsport	84	+52.5 s	20	66
14	15	(Australia) Rick Kelly	Nissan Altima L33	Nissan Motorsport	83	+1 lap	19	63
15	21	(Australia) Dale Wood	Holden VF Commodore	Britek Motorsport	83	+1 lap	13	60
16	18	(Australia) Lee Holdsworth	Holden VF Commodore	Charlie Schwerkolt Racing	83	+1 lap	15	57
17	222	(Australia) Nick Percat	Holden VF Commodore	Lucas Dumbrell Motorsport	83	+1 lap	17	54
18	17	(Australia) Scott Pye	Ford FG X Falcon	DJR Team Penske	83	+1 lap	21	51
19	23	(Australia) Michael Caruso	Nissan Altima L33	Nissan Motorsport	83	+1 lap	24	48
20	3	(Australia) Tim Blanchard	Holden VF Commodore	Lucas Dumbrell Motorsport	83	+1 lap	25	45
21	4	(Australia) Ashley Walsh	Mercedes-Benz E63 AMG	Erebus Motorsport	83	+1 lap	18	42
22	99	(Australia) James Moffat	Nissan Altima L33	Nissan Motorsport	82	+2 laps	22	39
23	9	(Australia) Will Davison	Mercedes-Benz E63 AMG	Erebus Motorsport	65	+19 laps	4	36
DNF	300	(Australia) Tim Slade	Holden VF Commodore	Walkinshaw Racing	82		16	
DNF	34	(Australia) David Wall	Volvo S60	Garry Rogers Motorsport	0		23	

== Championship standings ==
- After Race 6 of 36.

Drivers' Championship standings

Pos.	Driver	Points
1	(Australia) Jamie Whincup	483
2	(Australia) James Courtney	464
3	(Australia) Craig Lowndes	460
4	(Australia) Garth Tander	457
5	(New Zealand) Shane van Gisbergen	456

Teams' Championship standings

Pos.	Constructor	Points
1	Triple Eight Race Engineering	943
2	Holden Racing Team	921
3	Prodrive Racing Australia	729
4	Brad Jones Racing	687
5	Nissan Motorsport (7/15)	559

- Note: Only the top five positions are included for both sets of standings.
