= 2014 ITM 500 Auckland =

2014 V8 Supercar championship race

(New Zealand) 2014 ITM 500 Auckland
Event Information
- Round 4 of 14 in the 2014 International V8 Supercars Championship
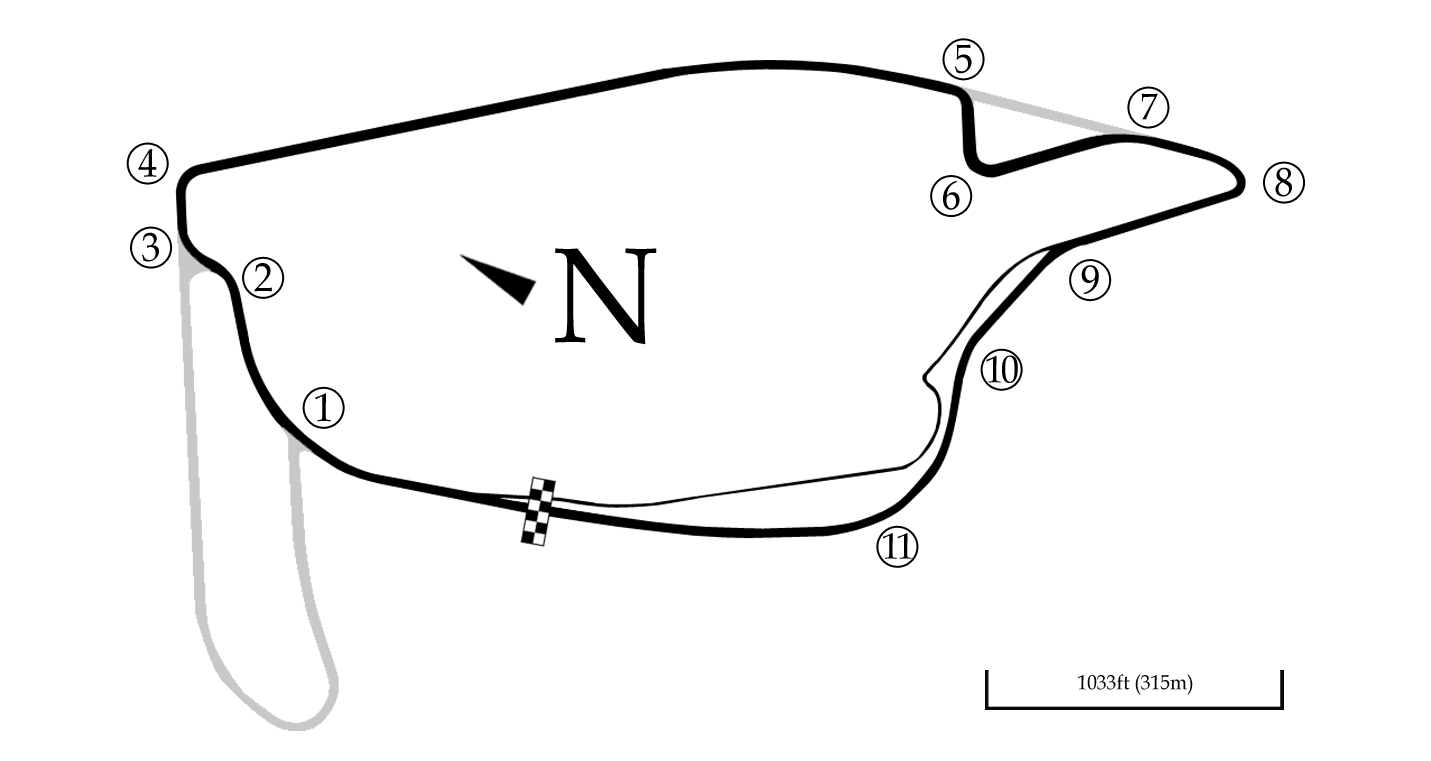
- Date: 25–27 April 2014
- Location: Pukekohe, New Zealand
- Venue: Pukekohe Park Raceway
- Weather: Fine

Results
Race 1
Distance	35 laps	100 km
Pole position	Jason Bright; Brad Jones Racing	1:03.1962
Winner	Jason Bright; Brad Jones Racing	40:48.3124
Race 2
Distance	35 laps	100 km
Pole position	James Courtney; Holden Racing Team	1:03.0638
Winner	Mark Winterbottom; Ford Performance Racing	39:39.7002
Race 3
Distance	35 laps	100 km
Pole position	Scott McLaughlin; Garry Rogers Motorsport	1:03.0438
Winner	Shane van Gisbergen; Tekno Autosports	39:34.1380
Race 4
Distance	70 laps	200 km
Pole position	Scott McLaughlin; Garry Rogers Motorsport	1:02.9914
Winner	Mark Winterbottom; Ford Performance Racing	1:16:14.0720

The 2014 ITM 500 Auckland was a motor race meeting for the Australian sedan-based V8 Supercars. It was the fourth event of the 2014 International V8 Supercars Championship. It was held on the weekend of 25–27 April at the Pukekohe Park Raceway, near Pukekohe, New Zealand.

The 2014 event marked the first - and so far only - time a Ford driver has won the overall round at Pukekohe, with Mark Winterbottom winning the Jason Richards Memorial Trophy.

== Race results ==
=== Race 10 ===
==== Qualifying ====
Pos.	No.	Name	Team	Car	Time
1	8	(Australia) Jason Bright	Brad Jones Racing	Holden Commodore (VF)	1:03.1962
2	1	(Australia) Jamie Whincup	Triple Eight Race Engineering	Holden Commodore (VF)	1:03.2714
3	97	(New Zealand) Shane van Gisbergen	Tekno Autosports	Holden Commodore (VF)	1:03.2742
4	888	(Australia) Craig Lowndes	Triple Eight Race Engineering	Holden Commodore (VF)	1:03.2883
5	9	(Australia) Will Davison	Erebus Motorsport	Mercedes-Benz E63 AMG	1:03.3167
6	22	(Australia) James Courtney	Holden Racing Team	Holden Commodore (VF)	1:03.3302
7	33	(New Zealand) Scott McLaughlin	Garry Rogers Motorsport	Volvo S60	1:03.3448
8	222	(Australia) Nick Percat	James Rosenberg Racing	Holden Commodore (VF)	1:03.3483
9	14	(New Zealand) Fabian Coulthard	Brad Jones Racing	Holden Commodore (VF)	1:03.3864
10	5	(Australia) Mark Winterbottom	Ford Performance Racing	Ford Falcon (FG)	1:03.3949
11	55	(Australia) David Reynolds	Rod Nash Racing	Ford Falcon (FG)	1:03.4091
12	4	(Australia) Lee Holdsworth	Erebus Motorsport	Mercedes-Benz E63 AMG	1:03.4204
13	360	(Australia) James Moffat	Nissan Motorsport	Nissan Altima (L33)	1:03.4484
14	47	(Australia) Tim Slade	Walkinshaw Racing	Holden Commodore (VF)	1:03.4496
15	7	(Australia) Todd Kelly	Nissan Motorsport	Nissan Altima (L33)	1:03.4713
16	2	(Australia) Garth Tander	Holden Racing Team	Holden Commodore (VF)	1:03.4847
17	36	(Australia) Michael Caruso	Nissan Motorsport	Nissan Altima (L33)	1:03.5027
18	18	(Australia) Jack Perkins	Charlie Schwerkolt Racing	Ford Falcon (FG)	1:03.5511
19	16	(Australia) Scott Pye	Dick Johnson Racing	Ford Falcon (FG)	1:03.6802
20	23	(Australia) Russell Ingall	Lucas Dumbrell Motorsport	Holden Commodore (VF)	1:03.7514
21	6	(Australia) Chaz Mostert	Ford Performance Racing	Ford Falcon (FG)	1:03.8049
22	17	(Australia) David Wall	Dick Johnson Racing	Ford Falcon (FG)	1:03.9599
23	34	(Sweden) Robert Dahlgren	Garry Rogers Motorsport	Volvo S60	1:03.9759
24	21	(Australia) Dale Wood	Britek Motorsport	Holden Commodore (VF)	1:04.0431
25	15	(Australia) Rick Kelly	Nissan Motorsport	Nissan Altima (L33)	1:08.9993

==== Race ====
Pos.	No.	Name	Team	Laps	Time	Points
1	8	(Australia) Jason Bright	Brad Jones Racing	33	40min 48.3125sec	50
2	97	(New Zealand) Shane van Gisbergen	Tekno Autosports	33	+ 1.680	46
3	888	(Australia) Craig Lowndes	Triple Eight Race Engineering	33	+ 4.855	43
4	97	(Australia) Shane van Gisbergen	Tekno Autosports	33	+ 5.596	40
5	9	(Australia) Will Davison	Erebus Motorsport	33	+ 6.155	37
6	222	(Australia) Nick Percat	James Rosenberg Racing	33	+ 7.159	34
7	14	(New Zealand) Fabian Coulthard	Brad Jones Racing	33	+ 10.086	32
8	33	(New Zealand) Scott McLaughlin	Garry Rogers Motorsport	33	+ 13.886	30
9	2	(Australia) Garth Tander	Holden Racing Team	33	+ 17.521	28
10	360	(Australia) James Moffat	Nissan Motorsport	33	+ 18.082	26
11	47	(Australia) Tim Slade	Walkinshaw Racing	33	+ 18.529	24
12	4	(Australia) Lee Holdsworth	Erebus Motorsport	33	+ 19.080	23
13	5	(Australia) Mark Winterbottom	Ford Performance Racing	33	+ 19.514	22
14	55	(Australia) David Reynolds	Rod Nash Racing	33	+ 20.595	21
15	23	(Australia) Russell Ingall	Lucas Dumbrell Motorsport	33	+ 21.217	20
16	7	(Australia) Todd Kelly	Nissan Motorsport	33	+ 22.231	19
17	36	(Australia) Michael Caruso	Nissan Motorsport	33	+ 23.380	18
18	16	(Australia) Scott Pye	Dick Johnson Racing	33	+ 24.107	17
19	18	(Australia) Jack Perkins	Charlie Schwerkolt Racing	33	+ 24.434	16
20	15	(Australia) Rick Kelly	Nissan Motorsport	33	+ 26.198	15
21	6	(Australia) Chaz Mostert	Ford Performance Racing	33	+ 26.603	14
22	34	(Sweden) Robert Dahlgren	Garry Rogers Motorsport	33	+ 38.422	13
23	21	(New Zealand) Dale Wood	Britek Motorsport	32	+ 1 lap	12
24	1	(Australia) Jamie Whincup	Triple Eight Race Engineering	26	+ 7 laps	11
Ret	17	(Australia) David Wall	Garry Rogers Motorsport	1	Accident	
Fastest lap: Jason Bright (Brad Jones Racing), 1:04.0876

=== Race 11 ===
==== Qualifying ====
Pos.	No.	Name	Team	Car	Time
1	22	(Australia) James Courtney	Holden Racing Team	Holden Commodore (VF)	1:03.0638
2	5	(Australia) Mark Winterbottom	Ford Performance Racing	Ford Falcon (FG)	1:03.0818
3	33	(New Zealand) Scott McLaughlin	Garry Rogers Motorsport	Volvo S60	1:03.1925
4	6	(Australia) Chaz Mostert	Ford Performance Racing	Ford Falcon (FG)	1:03.2487
5	1	(Australia) Jamie Whincup	Triple Eight Race Engineering	Holden Commodore (VF)	1:03.2647
6	222	(Australia) Nick Percat	James Rosenberg Racing	Holden Commodore (VF)	1:03.2671
7	97	(Australia) Shane van Gisbergen	Tekno Autosports	Holden Commodore (VF)	1:03.2781
8	8	(Australia) Jason Bright	Brad Jones Racing	Holden Commodore (VF)	1:03.2870
9	7	(Australia) Todd Kelly	Nissan Motorsport	Nissan Altima (L33)	1:03.2936
10	47	(Australia) Tim Slade	Walkinshaw Racing	Holden Commodore (VF)	1:03.3147
11	2	(Australia) Garth Tander	Holden Racing Team	Holden Commodore (VF)	1:03.3224
12	55	(Australia) David Reynolds	Rod Nash Racing	Ford Falcon (FG)	1:03.3347
13	14	(New Zealand) Fabian Coulthard	Brad Jones Racing	Holden Commodore (VF)	1:03.3396
14	16	(Australia) Scott Pye	Dick Johnson Racing	Ford Falcon (FG)	1:03.3453
15	888	(Australia) Craig Lowndes	Triple Eight Race Engineering	Holden Commodore (VF)	1:03.3473
16	9	(Australia) Will Davison	Erebus Motorsport	Mercedes-Benz E63 AMG	1:03.3482
17	4	(Australia) Lee Holdsworth	Erebus Motorsport	Mercedes-Benz E63 AMG	1:03.3584
18	36	(Australia) Michael Caruso	Nissan Motorsport	Nissan Altima (L33)	1:03.4233
19	15	(Australia) Rick Kelly	Nissan Motorsport	Nissan Altima (L33)	1:03.4756
20	360	(Australia) James Moffat	Nissan Motorsport	Nissan Altima (L33)	1:03.4853
21	18	(Australia) Jack Perkins	Charlie Schwerkolt Racing	Ford Falcon (FG)	1:03.5980
22	21	(Australia) Dale Wood	Britek Motorsport	Holden Commodore (VF)	1:03.7741
23	23	(Australia) Russell Ingall	Lucas Dumbrell Motorsport	Holden Commodore (VF)	1:03.8220
24	34	(Sweden) Robert Dahlgren	Garry Rogers Motorsport	Volvo S60	1:03.9866

==== Race ====
Pos.	No.	Name	Team	Laps	Time	Grid
1	5	(Australia) Mark Winterbottom	Ford Performance Racing	35	39min 39.7003sec	
2	22	(Australia) James Courtney	Holden Racing Team	35	+ 1.951	
3	6	(Australia) Chaz Mostert	Ford Performance Racing	35	+ 5.252	
4	1	(Australia) Jamie Whincup	Triple Eight Race Engineering	35	+ 6.789	
5	97	(New Zealand) Shane van Gisbergen	Tekno Autosports	35	+ 8.693	
6	33	(New Zealand) Scott McLaughlin	Garry Rogers Motorsport	35	+ 9.391	
7	222	(Australia) Nick Percat	James Rosenberg Racing	35	+ 10.315	
8	55	(Australia) David Reynolds	Rod Nash Racing	35	+	
9	2	(Australia) Garth Tander	Holden Racing Team	35		
10	14	(New Zealand) Fabian Coulthard	Brad Jones Racing	35		
11	16	(Australia) Scott Pye	Dick Johnson Racing	35		
12	8	(Australia) Jason Bright	Brad Jones Racing	35		
13	7	(Australia) Todd Kelly	Nissan Motorsport	35		
14	4	(Australia) Lee Holdsworth	Erebus Motorsport	35		
15	360	(Australia) James Moffat	Nissan Motorsport	35		
16	888	(Australia) Craig Lowndes	Triple Eight Race Engineering	35		
17	15	(Australia) Rick Kelly	Nissan Motorsport	35		
18	9	(Australia) Will Davison	Erebus Motorsport	35		
19	23	(Australia) Russell Ingall	Lucas Dumbrell Motorsport	35		
20	36	(Australia) Michael Caruso	Nissan Motorsport	35		
21	21	(Australia) Dale Wood	Britek Motorsport	35		
22	18	(Australia) Jack Perkins	Charlie Schwerkolt Racing	33	+ 2 laps	
Ret	34	(Sweden) Robert Dahlgren	Garry Rogers Motorsport	10	Retired	
Ret	47	(Australia) Tim Slade	Walkinshaw Racing	4	Retired	
Fastest lap: Mark Winterbottom (Ford Performance Racing), 1:04.2363

=== Race 12 ===
==== Qualifying ====
Pos.	No.	Name	Team	Car	Time
1	33	(New Zealand) Scott McLaughlin	Garry Rogers Motorsport	Volvo S60	1:03.0438
2	1	(Australia) Jamie Whincup	Triple Eight Race Engineering	Holden Commodore (VF)	1:03.1000
3	5	(Australia) Mark Winterbottom	Ford Performance Racing	Ford Falcon (FG)	1:03.1524
4	97	(Australia) Shane van Gisbergen	Tekno Autosports	Holden Commodore (VF)	1:03.2005
5	2	(Australia) Garth Tander	Holden Racing Team	Holden Commodore (VF)	1:03.2118
6	222	(Australia) Nick Percat	James Rosenberg Racing	Holden Commodore (VF)	1:03.2190
7	888	(Australia) Craig Lowndes	Triple Eight Race Engineering	Holden Commodore (VF)	1:03.2201
8	55	(Australia) David Reynolds	Rod Nash Racing	Ford Falcon (FG)	1:03.2952
9	7	(Australia) Todd Kelly	Nissan Motorsport	Nissan Altima (L33)	1:03.3323
10	360	(Australia) James Moffat	Nissan Motorsport	Nissan Altima (L33)	1:03.3362
11	22	(Australia) James Courtney	Holden Racing Team	Holden Commodore (VF)	1:03.4090
12	14	(New Zealand) Fabian Coulthard	Brad Jones Racing	Holden Commodore (VF)	1:03.4099
13	16	(Australia) Scott Pye	Dick Johnson Racing	Ford Falcon (FG)	1:03.4797
14	8	(Australia) Jason Bright	Brad Jones Racing	Holden Commodore (VF)	1:03.5187
15	15	(Australia) Rick Kelly	Nissan Motorsport	Nissan Altima (L33)	1:03.5356
16	36	(Australia) Michael Caruso	Nissan Motorsport	Nissan Altima (L33)	1:03.5445
17	47	(Australia) Tim Slade	Walkinshaw Racing	Holden Commodore (VF)	1:03.5678
18	23	(Australia) Russell Ingall	Lucas Dumbrell Motorsport	Holden Commodore (VF)	1:03.6781
19	21	(Australia) Dale Wood	Britek Motorsport	Holden Commodore (VF)	1:03.6817
20	34	(Sweden) Robert Dahlgren	Garry Rogers Motorsport	Volvo S60	1:03.7116
21	4	(Australia) Lee Holdsworth	Erebus Motorsport	Mercedes-Benz E63 AMG	1:03.7170
22	18	(Australia) Jack Perkins	Charlie Schwerkolt Racing	Ford Falcon (FG)	1:03.7543
23	6	(Australia) Chaz Mostert	Ford Performance Racing	Ford Falcon (FG)	1:03.8170
24	9	(Australia) Will Davison	Erebus Motorsport	Mercedes-Benz E63 AMG	4:02.6377

==== Race ====
Pos.	No.	Name	Team	Laps	Time	Grid
1	97	(New Zealand) Shane van Gisbergen	Tekno Autosports	35	39min 34.1380sec	
2	5	(Australia) Mark Winterbottom	Ford Performance Racing	35		
3	33	(New Zealand) Scott McLaughlin	Garry Rogers Motorsport	35		
4	1	(Australia) Jamie Whincup	Triple Eight Race Engineering	35		
5	2	(Australia) Garth Tander	Holden Racing Team	35		
6	55	(Australia) David Reynolds	Rod Nash Racing	35		
7	222	(Australia) Nick Percat	James Rosenberg Racing	35		
8	360	(Australia) James Moffat	Nissan Motorsport	35		
9	16	(Australia) Scott Pye	Dick Johnson Racing	35		
10	888	(Australia) Craig Lowndes	Triple Eight Race Engineering	35		
11	14	(New Zealand) Fabian Coulthard	Brad Jones Racing	35		
12	22	(Australia) James Courtney	Holden Racing Team	35		
13	36	(Australia) Michael Caruso	Nissan Motorsport	35		
14	23	(Australia) Russell Ingall	Lucas Dumbrell Motorsport	35		
15	15	(Australia) Rick Kelly	Nissan Motorsport	35		
16	6	(Australia) Chaz Mostert	Ford Performance Racing	35		
17	4	(Australia) Lee Holdsworth	Erebus Motorsport	35		
18	9	(Australia) Will Davison	Erebus Motorsport	35		
19	7	(Australia) Todd Kelly	Nissan Motorsport	35		
20	21	(Australia) Dale Wood	Britek Motorsport	35		
21	34	(Sweden) Robert Dahlgren	Garry Rogers Motorsport	35		
22	18	(Australia) Jack Perkins	Charlie Schwerkolt Racing	35		
23	8	(Australia) Jason Bright	Brad Jones Racing	35		
24	47	(Australia) Tim Slade	Walkinshaw Racing	35		
Fastest lap: Shane van Gisbergen (Tekno Autosports), 1:03.9300

=== Race 13 ===
==== Qualifying ====
Pos.	No.	Name	Team	Car	Time
1	33	(New Zealand) Scott McLaughlin	Garry Rogers Motorsport	Volvo S60	1:02.9914
2	47	(Australia) Tim Slade	Walkinshaw Racing	Holden Commodore (VF)	1:03.0494
3	97	(Australia) Shane van Gisbergen	Tekno Autosports	Holden Commodore (VF)	1:03.0586
4	5	(Australia) Mark Winterbottom	Ford Performance Racing	Ford Falcon (FG)	1:03.0997
5	6	(Australia) Chaz Mostert	Ford Performance Racing	Ford Falcon (FG)	1:03.1148
6	55	(Australia) David Reynolds	Rod Nash Racing	Ford Falcon (FG)	1:03.1193
7	36	(Australia) Michael Caruso	Nissan Motorsport	Nissan Altima (L33)	1:03.1375
8	1	(Australia) Jamie Whincup	Triple Eight Race Engineering	Holden Commodore (VF)	1:03.1493
9	7	(Australia) Todd Kelly	Nissan Motorsport	Nissan Altima (L33)	1:03.2139
10	15	(Australia) Rick Kelly	Nissan Motorsport	Nissan Altima (L33)	1:03.2188
11	4	(Australia) Lee Holdsworth	Erebus Motorsport	Mercedes-Benz E63 AMG	1:03.2755
12	222	(Australia) Nick Percat	James Rosenberg Racing	Holden Commodore (VF)	1:03.3040
13	22	(Australia) James Courtney	Holden Racing Team	Holden Commodore (VF)	1:03.3073
14	14	(New Zealand) Fabian Coulthard	Brad Jones Racing	Holden Commodore (VF)	1:03.3137
15	888	(Australia) Craig Lowndes	Triple Eight Race Engineering	Holden Commodore (VF)	1:03.3203
16	9	(Australia) Will Davison	Erebus Motorsport	Mercedes-Benz E63 AMG	1:03.3594
17	8	(Australia) Jason Bright	Brad Jones Racing	Holden Commodore (VF)	1:03.3683
18	18	(Australia) Jack Perkins	Charlie Schwerkolt Racing	Ford Falcon (FG)	1:03.4329
19	360	(Australia) James Moffat	Nissan Motorsport	Nissan Altima (L33)	1:03.4623
20	16	(Australia) Scott Pye	Dick Johnson Racing	Ford Falcon (FG)	1:03.5061
21	34	(Sweden) Robert Dahlgren	Garry Rogers Motorsport	Volvo S60	1:03.5469
22	2	(Australia) Garth Tander	Holden Racing Team	Holden Commodore (VF)	1:03.5515
23	21	(Australia) Dale Wood	Britek Motorsport	Holden Commodore (VF)	1:03.5695
24	23	(Australia) Russell Ingall	Lucas Dumbrell Motorsport	Holden Commodore (VF)	1:03.5744

==== Race ====
Pos.	No.	Name	Team	Laps	Time	Grid
1	5	(Australia) Mark Winterbottom	Ford Performance Racing	69	1hr 16min 14.0716sec	
2	33	(New Zealand) Scott McLaughlin	Garry Rogers Motorsport	69		
3	6	(Australia) Chaz Mostert	Ford Performance Racing	69		
4	97	(New Zealand) Shane van Gisbergen	Tekno Autosports	69		
5	36	(Australia) Michael Caruso	Nissan Motorsport	69		
6	8	(Australia) Jason Bright	Brad Jones Racing	69		
7	9	(Australia) Will Davison	Erebus Motorsport	69		
8	15	(Australia) Rick Kelly	Nissan Motorsport	69		
9	14	(New Zealand) Fabian Coulthard	Brad Jones Racing	69		
10	1	(Australia) Jamie Whincup	Triple Eight Race Engineering	69		
11	222	(Australia) Nick Percat	James Rosenberg Racing	69		
12	2	(Australia) Garth Tander	Holden Racing Team	69		
13	16	(Australia) Scott Pye	Dick Johnson Racing	69		
14	22	(Australia) James Courtney	Holden Racing Team	69		
15	4	(Australia) Lee Holdsworth	Erebus Motorsport	69		
16	360	(Australia) James Moffat	Nissan Motorsport	69		
17	55	(Australia) David Reynolds	Rod Nash Racing	69		
18	18	(Australia) Jack Perkins	Charlie Schwerkolt Racing	69		
19	23	(Australia) Russell Ingall	Lucas Dumbrell Motorsport	69		
20	888	(Australia) Craig Lowndes	Triple Eight Race Engineering	69		
21	47	(Australia) Tim Slade	Walkinshaw Racing	69		
22	21	(Australia) Dale Wood	Britek Motorsport	68	+ 1 lap	
23	34	(Sweden) Robert Dahlgren	Garry Rogers Motorsport	68	+ 1 lap	
24	7	(Australia) Todd Kelly	Nissan Motorsport	68	+ 1 lap	
Fastest lap: Scott McLaughlin (Garry Rogers Motorsport), 1:03.7239
