= 2015 Adelaide 500 =

2015 V8 Supercar championship race

(South Australia) 2015 Clipsal 500 Adelaide
Event Information
- Round 1 of 14 in the 2015 International V8 Supercars Championship
- Date: 26 February–1 March 2015
- Location: Adelaide, South Australia
- Venue: Adelaide Street Circuit
- Weather: Fine

Results
Race 1
Distance	33 laps	106 km
Pole position	Jamie Whincup; Triple Eight Race Engineering	1:20.0905
Winner	Jamie Whincup; Triple Eight Race Engineering	48:28.7493
Race 2
Distance	39 laps	125 km
Pole position	Jamie Whincup; Triple Eight Race Engineering	1:20.0319
Winner	Fabian Coulthard; Brad Jones Racing	59:05.6810
Race 3
Distance	78 laps	250 km
Pole position	James Courtney; Holden Racing Team	1:20.5396
Winner	James Courtney; Holden Racing Team	1:56:00.5103

The 2015 Clipsal 500 Adelaide was a motor race for V8 Supercars held on the weekend of 27 February to 1 March 2015. The event was held at the Adelaide Street Circuit in Adelaide, South Australia, and consisted of two races of 125 kilometres and one race of 250 kilometres in length. It was the first event of fourteen in the 2015 International V8 Supercars Championship.

Chasing after his seventh V8 Supercar championship, Jamie Whincup made a great start by taking pole position for both Saturday races. The start of Race 1 was abandoned after Scott McLaughlin's car suffered an oil pump failure on the warm-up lap. The race eventually got under way and Whincup controlled the race to take the first win of 2015. Chaz Mostert and Fabian Coulthard finished second and third respectively after a safety car late in the race.

McLaughlin's day became even worse when he was deemed to have jumped the start in Race 2. After serving his ten-second penalty at the conclusion of his pit stop, a further ten seconds was added to McLaughlin's race time as he served the penalty during a safety car period. Mostert retired after hitting the wall at turn 8, while Whincup fell down the order due to a punctured tyre. Brad Jones Racing's Fabian Coulthard took the win, followed by James Courtney and Craig Lowndes.

Former V8 Supercar champion Marcos Ambrose stole the spotlight on Sunday by qualifying for the Top Ten Shootout. Courtney set the fastest time in the Shootout to score pole position for the 250 km Race 3. Courtney managed to convert his pole into a race win, his second Sunday race win in succession at the event. Teammate Garth Tander finished third, while Shane van Gisbergen finished second after a hard-fought battle with Courtney. Whincup and Mostert were battling for fourth place on the final lap when they collided at Turn 10. Mostert spun into the wall and was collected by James Moffat with both failing to finish the race. Neither Mostert nor Whincup were penalised for the incident.

Courtney became the fifth driver in V8 Supercars to win two Clipsal 500 events and only the fourth to win two events in a row.

== Results ==
=== Race 1 ===
==== Qualifying ====
Pos.	No.	Driver	Car	Team	Time
1	1	(Australia) Jamie Whincup	Holden VF Commodore	Triple Eight Race Engineering	1:20.0905
2	14	(New Zealand) Fabian Coulthard	Holden VF Commodore	Brad Jones Racing	1:20.4342
3	33	(New Zealand) Scott McLaughlin	Volvo S60	Garry Rogers Motorsport	1:20.5087
4	6	(Australia) Chaz Mostert	Ford FG X Falcon	Prodrive Racing Australia	1:20.7089
5	22	(Australia) James Courtney	Holden VF Commodore	Holden Racing Team	1:20.7208
6	23	(Australia) Michael Caruso	Nissan Altima L33	Nissan Motorsport	1:20.8152
7	18	(Australia) Lee Holdsworth	Holden VF Commodore	Charlie Schwerkolt Racing	1:20.8552
8	888	(Australia) Craig Lowndes	Holden VF Commodore	Triple Eight Race Engineering	1:20.9013
9	8	(Australia) Jason Bright	Holden VF Commodore	Brad Jones Racing	1:20.9042
10	99	(Australia) James Moffat	Nissan Altima L33	Nissan Motorsport	1:20.9150
11	97	(New Zealand) Shane van Gisbergen	Holden VF Commodore	Tekno Autosports	1:20.9585
12	5	(Australia) Mark Winterbottom	Ford FG X Falcon	Prodrive Racing Australia	1:21.0115
13	47	(Australia) Tim Slade	Holden VF Commodore	Walkinshaw Racing	1:21.0159
14	55	(Australia) David Reynolds	Ford FG Falcon	Rod Nash Racing	1:21.0235
15	2	(Australia) Garth Tander	Holden VF Commodore	Holden Racing Team	1:21.0356
16	7	(Australia) Todd Kelly	Nissan Altima L33	Nissan Motorsport	1:21.2029
17	15	(Australia) Rick Kelly	Nissan Altima L33	Nissan Motorsport	1:21.2237
18	9	(Australia) Will Davison	Mercedes-Benz E63 AMG	Erebus Motorsport	1:21.2495
19	4	(Australia) Ashley Walsh	Mercedes-Benz E63 AMG	Erebus Motorsport	1:21.3417
20	222	(Australia) Nick Percat	Holden VF Commodore	Lucas Dumbrell Motorsport	1:21.3510
21	21	(Australia) Dale Wood	Holden VF Commodore	Britek Motorsport	1:21.4137
22	111	(New Zealand) Andre Heimgartner	Ford FG Falcon	Super Black Racing	1:21.5111
23	34	(Australia) David Wall	Volvo S60	Garry Rogers Motorsport	1:21.5202
24	17	(Australia) Marcos Ambrose	Ford FG X Falcon	DJR Team Penske	1:21.5782
25	3	(Australia) Tim Blanchard	Holden VF Commodore	Lucas Dumbrell Motorsport	No Time

==== Race ====
Pos.	No.	Driver	Car	Team	Laps	Time/retired	Grid	Points
1	1	(Australia) Jamie Whincup	Holden VF Commodore	Triple Eight Race Engineering	33	48:28.7493	1	75
2	6	(Australia) Chaz Mostert	Ford FG X Falcon	Prodrive Racing Australia	33	+0.9 s	4	69
3	14	(New Zealand) Fabian Coulthard	Holden VF Commodore	Brad Jones Racing	33	+1.3 s	2	64
4	888	(Australia) Craig Lowndes	Holden VF Commodore	Triple Eight Race Engineering	33	+1.5 s	8	60
5	5	(Australia) Mark Winterbottom	Ford FG X Falcon	Prodrive Racing Australia	33	+2.0 s	12	55
6	97	(New Zealand) Shane van Gisbergen	Holden VF Commodore	Tekno Autosports	33	+2.5 s	11	51
7	2	(Australia) Garth Tander	Holden VF Commodore	Holden Racing Team	33	+3.0 s	15	48
8	47	(Australia) Tim Slade	Holden VF Commodore	Walkinshaw Racing	33	+3.3 s	13	45
9	18	(Australia) Lee Holdsworth	Holden VF Commodore	Charlie Schwerkolt Racing	33	+3.9 s	7	42
10	22	(Australia) James Courtney	Holden VF Commodore	Holden Racing Team	33	+4.1 s	5	39
11	99	(Australia) James Moffat	Nissan Altima L33	Nissan Motorsport	33	+4.6 s	10	36
12	8	(Australia) Jason Bright	Holden VF Commodore	Brad Jones Racing	33	+5.2 s	9	34
13	55	(Australia) David Reynolds	Ford FG Falcon	Rod Nash Racing	33	+5.7 s	14	33
14	7	(Australia) Todd Kelly	Nissan Altima L33	Nissan Motorsport	33	+6.0 s	16	31
15	15	(Australia) Rick Kelly	Nissan Altima L33	Nissan Motorsport	33	+6.4 s	17	30
16	17	(Australia) Marcos Ambrose	Ford FG X Falcon	DJR Team Penske	33	+7.1 s	24	28
17	34	(Australia) David Wall	Volvo S60	Garry Rogers Motorsport	33	+8.6 s	23	27
18	222	(Australia) Nick Percat	Holden VF Commodore	Lucas Dumbrell Motorsport	33	+9.6 s	20	25
19	3	(Australia) Tim Blanchard	Holden VF Commodore	Lucas Dumbrell Motorsport	33	+10.1 s	25	24
20	4	(Australia) Ashley Walsh	Mercedes-Benz E63 AMG	Erebus Motorsport	33	+10.3 s	19	22
21	23	(Australia) Michael Caruso	Nissan Altima L33	Nissan Motorsport	33	+10.7 s	6	21
22	21	(Australia) Dale Wood	Holden VF Commodore	Britek Motorsport	33	+31.5 s	21	19
23	111	(New Zealand) Andre Heimgartner	Ford FG Falcon	Super Black Racing	32	+1 lap	22	18
DNF	9	(Australia) Will Davison	Mercedes-Benz E63 AMG	Erebus Motorsport	28	Accident	18	
DNF	33	(New Zealand) Scott McLaughlin	Volvo S60	Garry Rogers Motorsport	0	Oil leak	3	

=== Race 2 ===
==== Qualifying ====
Pos.	No.	Driver	Car	Team	Time
1	1	(Australia) Jamie Whincup	Holden VF Commodore	Triple Eight Race Engineering	1:20.0319
2	33	(New Zealand) Scott McLaughlin	Volvo S60	Garry Rogers Motorsport	1:20.3162
3	22	(Australia) James Courtney	Holden VF Commodore	Holden Racing Team	1:20.3390
4	14	(New Zealand) Fabian Coulthard	Holden VF Commodore	Brad Jones Racing	1:20.4599
5	97	(New Zealand) Shane van Gisbergen	Holden VF Commodore	Tekno Autosports	1:20.5030
6	55	(Australia) David Reynolds	Ford FG Falcon	Rod Nash Racing	1:20.5217
7	888	(Australia) Craig Lowndes	Holden VF Commodore	Triple Eight Race Engineering	1:20.5606
8	47	(Australia) Tim Slade	Holden VF Commodore	Walkinshaw Racing	1:20.5698
9	6	(Australia) Chaz Mostert	Ford FG X Falcon	Prodrive Racing Australia	1:20.6049
10	5	(Australia) Mark Winterbottom	Ford FG X Falcon	Prodrive Racing Australia	1:20.6346
11	2	(Australia) Garth Tander	Holden VF Commodore	Holden Racing Team	1:20.6587
12	23	(Australia) Michael Caruso	Nissan Altima L33	Nissan Motorsport	1:20.7121
13	18	(Australia) Lee Holdsworth	Holden VF Commodore	Charlie Schwerkolt Racing	1:20.7371
14	99	(Australia) James Moffat	Nissan Altima L33	Nissan Motorsport	1:20.8913
15	4	(Australia) Ashley Walsh	Mercedes-Benz E63 AMG	Erebus Motorsport	1:20.9826
16	21	(Australia) Dale Wood	Holden VF Commodore	Britek Motorsport	1:21.0559
17	9	(Australia) Will Davison	Mercedes-Benz E63 AMG	Erebus Motorsport	1:21.0693
18	15	(Australia) Rick Kelly	Nissan Altima L33	Nissan Motorsport	1:21.0759
19	7	(Australia) Todd Kelly	Nissan Altima L33	Nissan Motorsport	1:21.0873
20	8	(Australia) Jason Bright	Holden VF Commodore	Brad Jones Racing	1:21.1049
21	34	(Australia) David Wall	Volvo S60	Garry Rogers Motorsport	1:21.1393
22	222	(Australia) Nick Percat	Holden VF Commodore	Lucas Dumbrell Motorsport	1:21.1644
23	111	(New Zealand) Andre Heimgartner	Ford FG Falcon	Super Black Racing	1:21.4483
24	17	(Australia) Marcos Ambrose	Ford FG X Falcon	DJR Team Penske	1:22.0064
25	3	(Australia) Tim Blanchard	Holden VF Commodore	Lucas Dumbrell Motorsport	1:22.8052

==== Race ====
Pos.	No.	Driver	Car	Team	Laps	Time/retired	Grid	Points
1	14	(New Zealand) Fabian Coulthard	Holden VF Commodore	Brad Jones Racing	39	59:05.6810	4	75
2	22	(Australia) James Courtney	Holden VF Commodore	Holden Racing Team	39	+2.0 s	3	69
3	888	(Australia) Craig Lowndes	Holden VF Commodore	Triple Eight Race Engineering	39	+8.9 s	7	64
4	2	(Australia) Garth Tander	Holden VF Commodore	Holden Racing Team	39	+10.0 s	11	60
5	8	(Australia) Jason Bright	Holden VF Commodore	Brad Jones Racing	39	+15.0 s	20	55
6	15	(Australia) Rick Kelly	Nissan Altima L33	Nissan Motorsport	39	+15.7 s	18	51
7	99	(Australia) James Moffat	Nissan Altima L33	Nissan Motorsport	39	+16.4 s	14	48
8	4	(Australia) Ashley Walsh	Mercedes-Benz E63 AMG	Erebus Motorsport	39	+17.7 s	15	45
9	33	(New Zealand) Scott McLaughlin	Volvo S60	Garry Rogers Motorsport	39	+18.2 s	2	42
10	18	(Australia) Lee Holdsworth	Holden VF Commodore	Charlie Schwerkolt Racing	39	+18.3 s	13	39
11	5	(Australia) Mark Winterbottom	Ford FG X Falcon	Prodrive Racing Australia	39	+18.8 s	10	36
12	7	(Australia) Todd Kelly	Nissan Altima L33	Nissan Motorsport	39	+19.2 s	19	34
13	97	(New Zealand) Shane van Gisbergen	Holden VF Commodore	Tekno Autosports	39	+20.0 s	5	33
14	222	(Australia) Nick Percat	Holden VF Commodore	Lucas Dumbrell Motorsport	39	+20.5 s	22	31
15	34	(Australia) David Wall	Volvo S60	Garry Rogers Motorsport	39	+22.7 s	21	30
16	17	(Australia) Marcos Ambrose	Ford FG X Falcon	DJR Team Penske	39	+24.1 s	24	28
17	55	(Australia) David Reynolds	Ford FG Falcon	Rod Nash Racing	39	+25.2 s	6	27
18	21	(Australia) Dale Wood	Holden VF Commodore	Britek Motorsport	39	+26.5 s	16	25
19	3	(Australia) Tim Blanchard	Holden VF Commodore	Lucas Dumbrell Motorsport	39	+27.2 s	25	24
20	111	(New Zealand) Andre Heimgartner	Ford FG Falcon	Super Black Racing	39	+27.6 s	23	22
21	1	(Australia) Jamie Whincup	Holden VF Commodore	Triple Eight Race Engineering	39	+55.6 s	1	21
DNF	47	(Australia) Tim Slade	Holden VF Commodore	Walkinshaw Racing	25	Puncture	8	
DNF	23	(Australia) Michael Caruso	Nissan Altima L33	Nissan Motorsport	16	Accident	12	
DNF	6	(Australia) Chaz Mostert	Ford FG X Falcon	Prodrive Racing Australia	3	Accident	9	
DNS	9	(Australia) Will Davison	Mercedes-Benz E63 AMG	Erebus Motorsport	0		17	

=== Race 3 ===
==== Qualifying ====
Pos.	No.	Driver	Car	Team	Time
1	97	(New Zealand) Shane van Gisbergen	Holden VF Commodore	Tekno Autosports	1:20.0084
2	99	(Australia) James Moffat	Nissan Altima L33	Nissan Motorsport	1:20.0341
3	22	(Australia) James Courtney	Holden VF Commodore	Holden Racing Team	1:20.0757
4	14	(New Zealand) Fabian Coulthard	Holden VF Commodore	Brad Jones Racing	1:20.0832
5	1	(Australia) Jamie Whincup	Holden VF Commodore	Triple Eight Race Engineering	1:20.1335
6	47	(Australia) Tim Slade	Holden VF Commodore	Walkinshaw Racing	1:20.1575
7	8	(Australia) Jason Bright	Holden VF Commodore	Brad Jones Racing	1:20.2255
8	33	(New Zealand) Scott McLaughlin	Volvo S60	Garry Rogers Motorsport	1:20.2262
9	17	(Australia) Marcos Ambrose	Ford FG X Falcon	DJR Team Penske	1:20.2435
10	2	(Australia) Garth Tander	Holden VF Commodore	Holden Racing Team	1:20.2602
11	5	(Australia) Mark Winterbottom	Ford FG X Falcon	Prodrive Racing Australia	1:20.3444
12	15	(Australia) Rick Kelly	Nissan Altima L33	Nissan Motorsport	1:20.3542
13	18	(Australia) Lee Holdsworth	Holden VF Commodore	Charlie Schwerkolt Racing	1:20.4488
14	888	(Australia) Craig Lowndes	Holden VF Commodore	Triple Eight Race Engineering	1:20.4750
15	23	(Australia) Michael Caruso	Nissan Altima L33	Nissan Motorsport	1:20.5324
16	21	(Australia) Dale Wood	Holden VF Commodore	Britek Motorsport	1:20.5534
17	6	(Australia) Chaz Mostert	Ford FG X Falcon	Prodrive Racing Australia	1:20.5629
18	4	(Australia) Ashley Walsh	Mercedes-Benz E63 AMG	Erebus Motorsport	1:20.5649
19	7	(Australia) Todd Kelly	Nissan Altima L33	Nissan Motorsport	1:20.5919
20	55	(Australia) David Reynolds	Ford FG Falcon	Rod Nash Racing	1:20.6187
21	34	(Australia) David Wall	Volvo S60	Garry Rogers Motorsport	1:20.6501
22	222	(Australia) Nick Percat	Holden VF Commodore	Lucas Dumbrell Motorsport	1:20.6531
23	9	(Australia) Will Davison	Mercedes-Benz E63 AMG	Erebus Motorsport	1:20.7843
24	111	(New Zealand) Andre Heimgartner	Ford FG Falcon	Super Black Racing	1:20.9014
25	3	(Australia) Tim Blanchard	Holden VF Commodore	Lucas Dumbrell Motorsport	1:21.8204

==== Top 10 Shootout ====
Pos.	No.	Name	Car	Team	QPos.	Time
1	22	(Australia) James Courtney	Holden VF Commodore	Holden Racing Team	3	1:20.5396
2	14	(New Zealand) Fabian Coulthard	Holden VF Commodore	Brad Jones Racing	4	1:20.5839
3	1	(Australia) Jamie Whincup	Holden VF Commodore	Triple Eight Race Engineering	5	1:20.6024
4	33	(New Zealand) Scott McLaughlin	Volvo S60	Garry Rogers Motorsport	8	1:20.6073
5	99	(Australia) James Moffat	Nissan Altima L33	Nissan Motorsport	2	1:20.6105
6	97	(New Zealand) Shane van Gisbergen	Holden VF Commodore	Tekno Autosports	1	1:20.6355
7	2	(Australia) Garth Tander	Holden VF Commodore	Holden Racing Team	10	1:21.0204
8	47	(Australia) Tim Slade	Holden VF Commodore	Walkinshaw Racing	6	1:21.1497
9	17	(Australia) Marcos Ambrose	Ford FG X Falcon	DJR Team Penske	9	1:21.1679
10	8	(Australia) Jason Bright	Holden VF Commodore	Brad Jones Racing	7	1:21.2326

==== Race ====
Pos.	No.	Driver	Car	Team	Laps	Time/retired	Grid	Points
1	22	(Australia) James Courtney	Holden VF Commodore	Holden Racing Team	78	1:56:00.5103	1	150
2	97	(New Zealand) Shane van Gisbergen	Holden VF Commodore	Tekno Autosports	78	+0.7 s	6	138
3	2	(Australia) Garth Tander	Holden VF Commodore	Holden Racing Team	78	+1.9 s	7	129
4	1	(Australia) Jamie Whincup	Holden VF Commodore	Triple Eight Race Engineering	78	+13.3 s	3	120
5	5	(Australia) Mark Winterbottom	Ford FG X Falcon	Prodrive Racing Australia	78	+13.9 s	11	111
6	14	(New Zealand) Fabian Coulthard	Holden VF Commodore	Brad Jones Racing	78	+14.6 s	2	102
7	15	(Australia) Rick Kelly	Nissan Altima L33	Nissan Motorsport	78	+16.4 s	12	96
8	47	(Australia) Tim Slade	Holden VF Commodore	Walkinshaw Racing	78	+20.7 s	8	90
9	888	(Australia) Craig Lowndes	Holden VF Commodore	Triple Eight Race Engineering	78	+24.4 s	14	84
10	7	(Australia) Todd Kelly	Nissan Altima L33	Nissan Motorsport	78	+28.6 s	19	78
11	8	(Australia) Jason Bright	Holden VF Commodore	Brad Jones Racing	78	+40.8 s	10	72
12	17	(Australia) Marcos Ambrose	Ford FG X Falcon	DJR Team Penske	78	+41.2 s	9	69
13	21	(Australia) Dale Wood	Holden VF Commodore	Britek Motorsport	78	+45.2 s	16	66
14	23	(Australia) Michael Caruso	Nissan Altima L33	Nissan Motorsport	78	+48.8 s	15	63
15	55	(Australia) David Reynolds	Ford FG Falcon	Rod Nash Racing	78	+49.2 s	20	60
16	34	(Australia) David Wall	Volvo S60	Garry Rogers Motorsport	78	+51.8 s	21	57
17	3	(Australia) Tim Blanchard	Holden VF Commodore	Lucas Dumbrell Motorsport	78	+62.6 s	25	54
18	33	(New Zealand) Scott McLaughlin	Volvo S60	Garry Rogers Motorsport	74	+4 laps	4	51
19	9	(Australia) Will Davison	Mercedes-Benz E63 AMG	Erebus Motorsport	73	+5 laps	23	48
20	222	(Australia) Nick Percat	Holden VF Commodore	Lucas Dumbrell Motorsport	70	+8 laps	22	45
21	111	(New Zealand) Andre Heimgartner	Ford FG Falcon	Super Black Racing	62	+16 laps	24	42
DNF	6	(Australia) Chaz Mostert	Ford FG X Falcon	Prodrive Racing Australia	77	Collision	17	
DNF	99	(Australia) James Moffat	Nissan Altima L33	Nissan Motorsport	77	Collision	5	
DNF	18	(Australia) Lee Holdsworth	Holden VF Commodore	Charlie Schwerkolt Racing	31	Accident	13	
DNF	4	(Australia) Ashley Walsh	Mercedes-Benz E63 AMG	Erebus Motorsport	22	Breakdown	18	

== Championship standings ==
- After Race 3 of 36

Drivers' Championship standings

Pos.	Driver	Points
1	(Australia) James Courtney	258
2	(New Zealand) Fabian Coulthard	241
3	(Australia) Garth Tander	237
4	(New Zealand) Shane van Gisbergen	222
5	(Australia) Jamie Whincup	216

Teams' Championship standings

Pos.	Constructor	Points
1	Holden Racing Team	495
2	Triple Eight Race Engineering	424
3	Brad Jones Racing	402
4	Nissan Motorsport (7/15)	320
5	Prodrive Racing Australia	271

- Note: Only the top five positions are included for both sets of standings.

== Support races ==
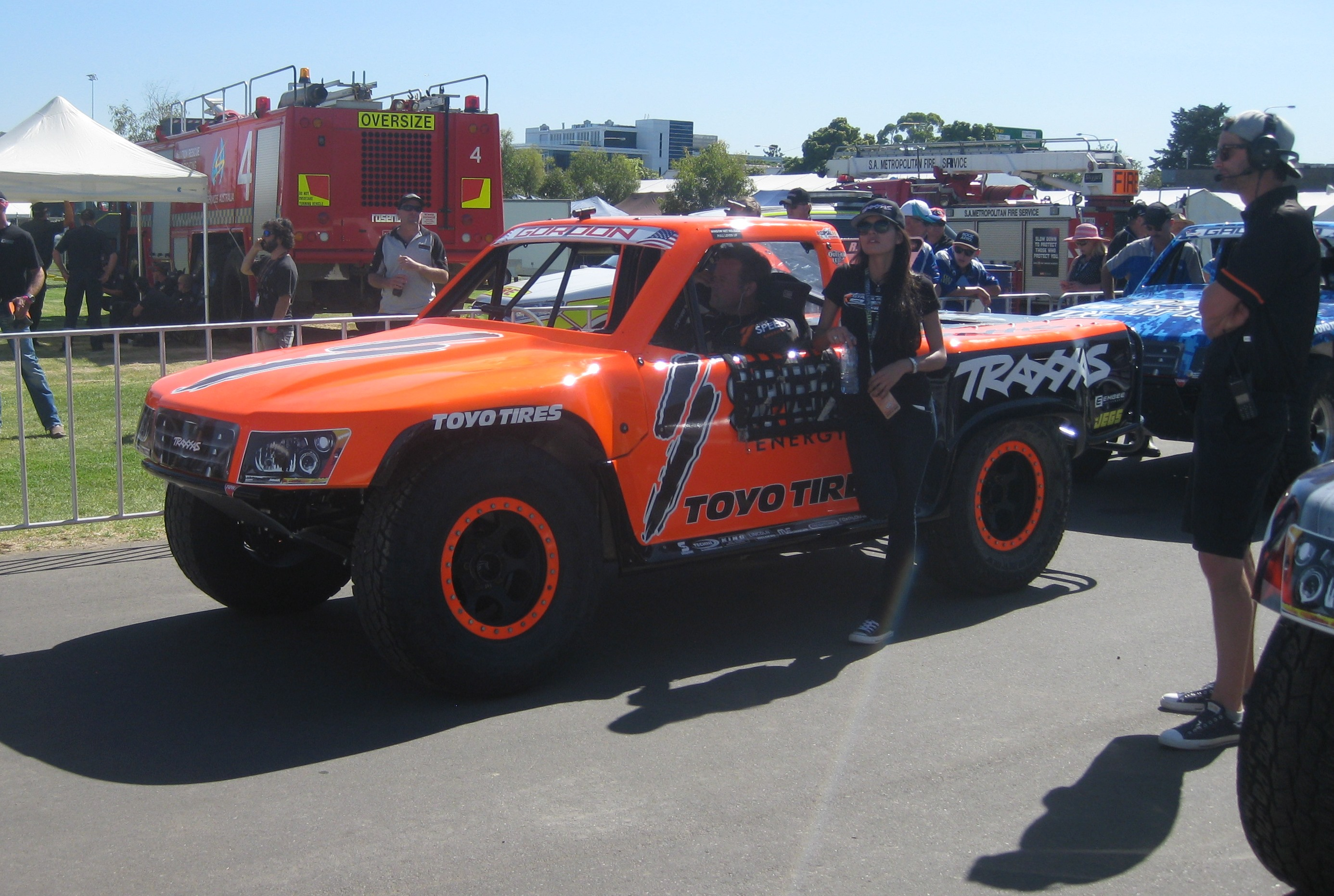
The Stadium Super Truck of Robby Gordon at the 2015 Clipsal 500 Adelaide

Seven support series raced during the weekend, including the Australian debut of Robby Gordon's Stadium Super Trucks.
