= 2013 Wilson Security Sandown 500 =

Australian motor car race

(Victoria (state)) 2013 Wilson Security Sandown 500
Event Information
- Round 10 of 14 in the 2013 International V8 Supercars Championship
- Date: 13–15 September 2013
- Location: Melbourne, Victoria
- Venue: Sandown International Raceway
- Weather: Fine

Results
Race 1
| Distance | 161 laps | 500 km |
| Pole position | Will Davison; Steve Owen; Ford Performance Racing | |
| Winner | Jamie Whincup; Paul Dumbrell; Triple Eight Race Engineering | 3:22:54.6204 |

The 2013 Wilson Security Sandown 500 was an endurance race for V8 Supercars. It was staged at the Sandown International Motor Raceway in Victoria, Australia on 15 September 2013 and was Race 28 of the 2013 V8 Supercars Championship. The race, which was the 43rd "Sandown 500", was won by Jamie Whincup and Paul Dumbrell driving a Holden Commodore (VF).

== Results ==
=== Race ===
| Pos. | No. | Name | Car | Team | Laps | Time/Retired | Grid | Points |
|---|---|---|---|---|---|---|---|---|
| 1 | 1 | (Australia) Jamie Whincup (Australia) Paul Dumbrell | Holden Commodore (VF) | Triple Eight Race Engineering | 161 | 3hr 22min 54.6204sec | 2 | 300 |
| 2 | 888 | (Australia) Craig Lowndes (Australia) Warren Luff | Holden Commodore (VF) | Triple Eight Race Engineering | 161 | + 8.2 s | 3 | 276 |
| 3 | 6 | (Australia) Will Davison (Australia) Steve Owen | Ford Falcon (FG) | Ford Performance Racing | 161 | + 17.9 s | 1 | 258 |
| 4 | 4 | (Australia) Lee Holdsworth (New Zealand) Craig Baird | Mercedes-Benz E63 AMG | Erebus Motorsport | 161 | + 18.9 s | 19 | 240 |
| 5 | 22 | (Australia) James Courtney (New Zealand) Greg Murphy | Holden Commodore (VF) | Holden Racing Team | 161 | + 26.2 s | 7 | 222 |
| 6 | 5 | (Australia) Mark Winterbottom (New Zealand) Steven Richards | Ford Falcon (FG) | Ford Performance Racing | 161 | + 26.5 s | 4 | 204 |
| 7 | 14 | (New Zealand) Fabian Coulthard (Australia) Luke Youlden | Holden Commodore (VF) | Brad Jones Racing | 161 | + 31.3 s | 15 | 192 |
| 8 | 33 | (New Zealand) Scott McLaughlin (Australia) Jack Perkins | Holden Commodore (VF) | Garry Rogers Motorsport | 161 | + 33.3 s | 9 | 180 |
| 9 | 66 | (Australia) Russell Ingall (Australia) Ryan Briscoe | Holden Commodore (VF) | Walkinshaw Racing | 161 | + 38.5 s | 16 | 168 |
| 10 | 34 | (France) Alexandre Prémat (Australia) Greg Ritter | Holden Commodore (VF) | Garry Rogers Motorsport | 161 | + 49.9 s | 12 | 156 |
| 11 | 7 | (Australia) Todd Kelly (Australia) David Russell | Nissan Altima | Nissan Motorsport | 161 | + 51.8 s | 10 | 144 |
| 12 | 97 | (New Zealand) Shane van Gisbergen (Netherlands) Jeroen Bleekemolen | Holden Commodore (VF) | Tekno Autosports | 161 | + 59.6 s | 14 | 138 |
| 13 | 19 | (Australia) Jonathon Webb (Germany) Marc Lieb | Holden Commodore (VF) | Tekno Autosports | 161 | + 1:00.6 | 23 | 132 |
| 14 | 12 | (Australia) Chaz Mostert (Australia) Dale Wood | Ford Falcon (FG) | Dick Johnson Racing | 161 | + 1:09.7 | 5 | 126 |
| 15 | 18 | (Australia) Alex Davison (New Zealand) John McIntyre | Ford Falcon (FG) | Charlie Schwerkolt Racing | 160 | + 1 lap | 27 | 120 |
| 16 | 15 | (Australia) Rick Kelly (Australia) Karl Reindler | Nissan Altima | Nissan Motorsport | 160 | + 1 lap | 21 | 114 |
| 17 | 55 | (Australia) David Reynolds (Australia) Dean Canto | Ford Falcon (FG) | Rod Nash Racing | 160 | + 1 lap | 6 | 108 |
| 18 | 88 | (Australia) Dean Fiore (New Zealand) Matt Halliday | Holden Commodore (VF) | Lucas Dumbrell Motorsport | 160 | + 1 lap | 28 | 102 |
| 19 | 21 | (Australia) David Wall (New Zealand) Chris Pither | Holden Commodore (VF) | Britek Motorsport | 160 | + 1 lap | 18 | 96 |
| 20 | 36 | (Australia) Michael Caruso (New Zealand) Daniel Gaunt | Nissan Altima | Nissan Motorsport | 160 | + 1 lap | 24 | 90 |
| 21 | 47 | (Australia) Tim Slade (Australia) Andrew Thompson | Mercedes-Benz E63 AMG | James Rosenberg Racing | 159 | + 2 laps | 8 | 84 |
| 22 | 2 | (Australia) Garth Tander (Australia) Nick Percat | Holden Commodore (VF) | Holden Racing Team | 152 | + 9 laps | 13 | 78 |
| 23 | 3 | (Australia) Tony D'Alberto (New Zealand) Jonny Reid | Holden Commodore (VF) | Tony D'Alberto Racing | 152 | + 9 laps | 17 | 72 |
| 24 | 8 | (Australia) Jason Bright (Australia) Andrew Jones | Holden Commodore (VF) | Brad Jones Racing | 147 | + 14 laps | 11 | 66 |
| 25 | 9 | (Germany) Maro Engel (Australia) Steven Johnson | Mercedes-Benz E63 AMG | Erebus Motorsport | 143 | + 18 laps | 25 | 60 |
| 26 | 360 | (Australia) James Moffat (Australia) Taz Douglas | Nissan Altima | Nissan Motorsport | 123 | + 38 laps | 20 | 54 |
| Ret | 80 | (Australia) Scott Pye (Australia) Paul Morris | Holden Commodore (VF) | Lucas Dumbrell Motorsport | 135 | Steering | 26 | |
| Ret | 17 | (Australia) Tim Blanchard (Australia) Ashley Walsh | Ford Falcon (FG) | Dick Johnson Racing | 33 | Accident | 22 | |
Sources:

- Fastest race lap: 1:09.9061 – Jamie Whincup

== Championship standings after the race ==
- After 28 of 36 races.

Drivers' Championship standings

| | Pos. | Driver | Points |
|---|---|---|---|
| | 1 | Jamie Whincup | 2147 |
| 2 | 2 | Craig Lowndes | 2051 |
| 1 | 3 | Will Davison | 2050 |
| 1 | 4 | Mark Winterbottom | 1981 |
| 1 | 5 | James Courtney | 1909 |

Teams' Championship standings

| Pos. | Constructor | Points |
|---|---|---|
| 1 | Triple Eight Race Engineering | 4238 |
| 2 | Ford Performance Racing | 4056 |
| 3 | Brad Jones Racing | 3661 |
| 4 | Holden Racing Team | 3604 |
| 5 | Tekno Autosports | 3199 |

- Note: Only the top five positions are included for both sets of standings.
