= 2013 Armor All Gold Coast 600 =

2013 V8 Supercar championship race

Coordinates: 27°59′23″S 153°25′40″E

(Queensland) 2013 Armor All Gold Coast 600
Event Information
- Round 12 of 14 in the 2013 International V8 Supercars Championship
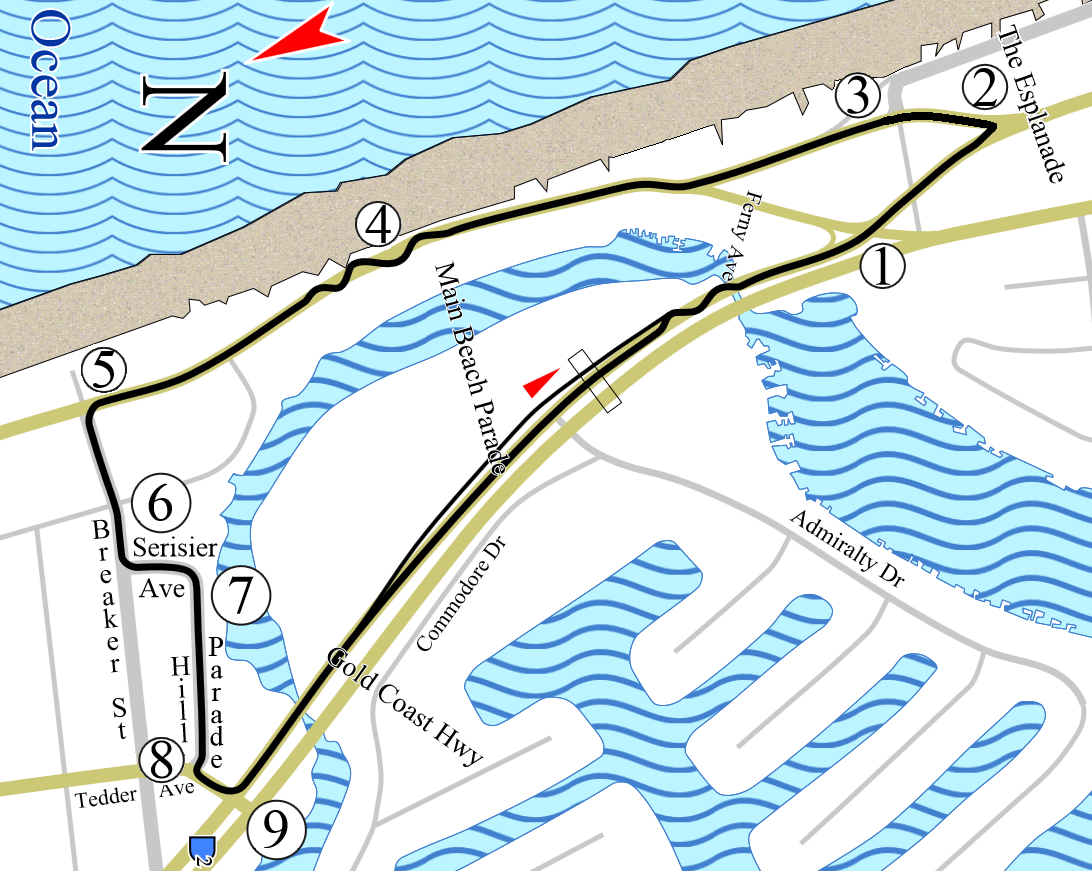
- Date: 25–27 October 2013
- Location: Surfers Paradise, Queensland
- Venue: Surfers Paradise Street Circuit
- Weather: Fine

Results
Race 1
Distance	102 laps	300 km
Pole position	Craig Lowndes; Triple Eight Race Engineering	1:10.9569
Winner	Craig Lowndes; Warren Luff; Triple Eight Race Engineering	2:12:10.6077
Race 2
Distance	102 laps	300 km
Pole position	David Reynolds; Rod Nash Racing	1:10.0480
Winner	David Reynolds; Dean Canto; Rod Nash Racing	2:09:31.0836

The 2013 Armor All Gold Coast 600 was a motor race for the Australian sedan-based V8 Supercars racing cars. It was the eleventh event of the 2013 International V8 Supercars Championship. It was held on the weekend of 25–27 October at the Surfers Paradise Street Circuit on the Gold Coast, Queensland.

The twelfth event on the Gold Coast saw Craig Lowndes take the championship lead from Triple Eight Race Engineering teammate Jamie Whincup after Whincup and co-driver Paul Dumbrell failed to finish the Saturday race, with Dumbrell causing a heavy crash for Greg Murphy before suffering a drive-train failure. Lowndes and co-driver Warren Luff won the race from pole ahead of Shane van Gisbergen and Jeroen Bleekemolen, the first Dutchman to stand on a V8 Supercar podium, and Mark Winterbottom and Steven Richards. David Reynolds won the first race of his career in the Sunday race, with he and co-driver Dean Canto winning from pole. Fabian Coulthard and Luke Youlden finished second ahead of Russell Ingall and Ryan Briscoe, Briscoe's first podium finish and Ingall's first since 2009. James Courtney and Murphy looked set to take victory until a steering problem put them out of the race. Whincup and Dumbrell finished fourth while Lowndes and Luff were eighth, leaving Lowndes with a six-point championship lead. Lowndes and Luff won the Endurance Cup ahead of Whincup and Dumbrell and Winterbottom and Richards.

== Standings ==
- After 23 of 30 races.

Pos	No	Name	Team	Points
1	1	(Australia) Jamie Whincup	Triple Eight Race Engineering	3060
2	5	(Australia) Mark Winterbottom	Ford Performance Racing	2842
3	888	(Australia) Craig Lowndes	Triple Eight Race Engineering	2815
4	6	(Australia) Will Davison	Ford Performance Racing	2503
5	9	(New Zealand) Shane van Gisbergen	Stone Brothers Racing	2182
