= 2016 Sydney SuperSprint =

2016 V8 Supercar championship race

(New South Wales) 2016 Red Rooster Sydney SuperSprint
Event Information
- Round 9 of 14 in the 2016 International V8 Supercars Championship
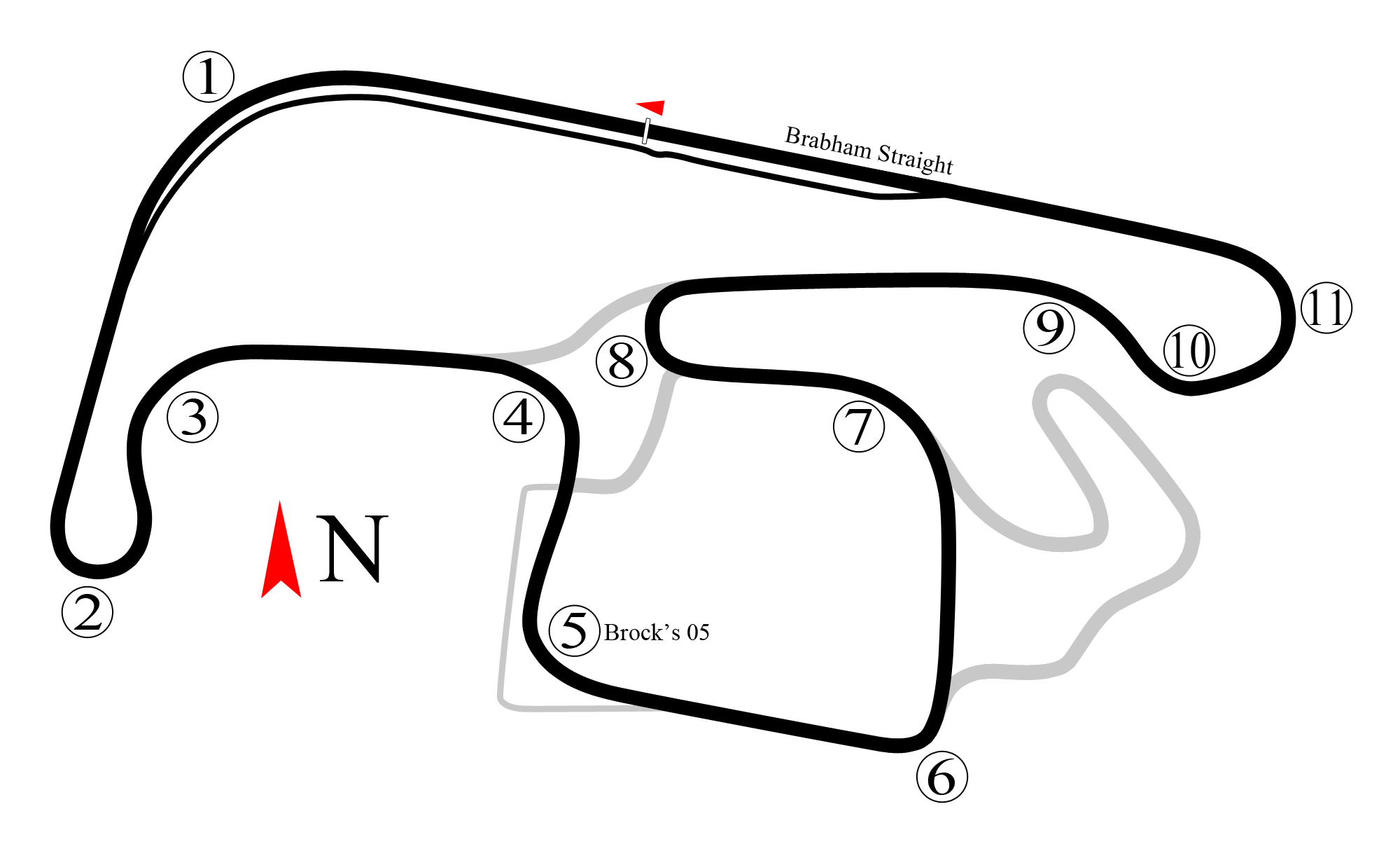
- Date: 26–28 August 2016
- Location: Eastern Creek, New South Wales
- Venue: Sydney Motorsport Park
- Weather: Friday: fine, overcast Saturday: fine Sunday: fine

Results
Race 1
Distance	31 laps	120 km
Pole position	Chaz Mostert; Rod Nash Racing	1:28.8272
Winner	Shane van Gisbergen; Triple Eight Race Engineering	48:51.0408
Race 2
Distance	51 laps	200 km
Pole position	Chaz Mostert; Rod Nash Racing	1:29.4413
Winner	Jamie Whincup; Triple Eight Race Engineering	1:20:45.1664

The 2016 Red Rooster Sydney SuperSprint was a motor racing event for Supercars, held on the weekend of 26 to 28 August 2016. The event was held at Sydney Motorsport Park in Eastern Creek, New South Wales, and consisted of one race of 120 kilometres and one race of 200 km in length. It was the ninth event of fourteen in the 2016 International V8 Supercars Championship and hosted Races 18 and 19 of the season. The event was the 19th running of the Sydney SuperSprint.

The event saw Triple Eight Race Engineering extend its winning streak to seven races, with its drivers Shane van Gisbergen and Jamie Whincup winning Races 18 and 19 respectively. By taking victory in Race 19, Whincup became the second driver in championship history to reach 100 race wins, after his teammate Craig Lowndes. Lowndes started his 600th championship race in Race 19, becoming the first driver to reach the mark, and finished second behind Whincup. James Courtney scored a podium finish behind Van Gisbergen and Whincup in Race 18 while Chaz Mostert completed the podium in Race 19.

== Report ==
=== Background ===
After running the car belonging to Dunlop Series driver Kurt Kostecki at the previous two events, Team 18 completed the build of its new car two weeks prior to the event. The team's regular driver Lee Holdsworth, who had been injured at the Darwin event, completed laps in the car during a shakedown run at Winton Motor Raceway one week prior to the event, though the team's endurance co-driver, Karl Reindler, was announced as the driver for the race weekend.

Triple Eight Race Engineering and the Holden Racing Team also debuted new cars at the event, for Jamie Whincup and Garth Tander respectively. The two teams were part of an announcement from Holden in the lead up to the event, with the company announcing that the "Holden Racing Team" brand would be moved to Triple Eight for the 2017 season while Walkinshaw Racing, which had operated under the "Holden Racing Team" name in various guises since 1990, would have its factory support removed.

After Craig Baird stepped in to replace Aaren Russell at the previous event in Ipswich, Erebus Motorsport announced Dunlop Series driver Shae Davies as the full-time replacement for Russell. The car also sported a new livery with backing from Supa Centa Moore Park and Westfield Eastgardens. A number of other cars also carried new liveries: DJR Team Penske continued its sponsor rotation system with backing from MAN; Nissan Motorsport ran a Nissan Financial Services livery on Michael Caruso's car; and Lucas Dumbrell Motorsport featured a Repair Management Australia livery on both of its cars. Super Black Racing ran a tribute to its founder Tony Lentino, who died one month before the event. The other three cars run by Prodrive Racing Australia also displayed a tribute.

Whincup entered the event as the championship leader, 110 points clear of his teammate Shane van Gisbergen, with Mark Winterbottom a further ten points behind in third.

=== Practice ===
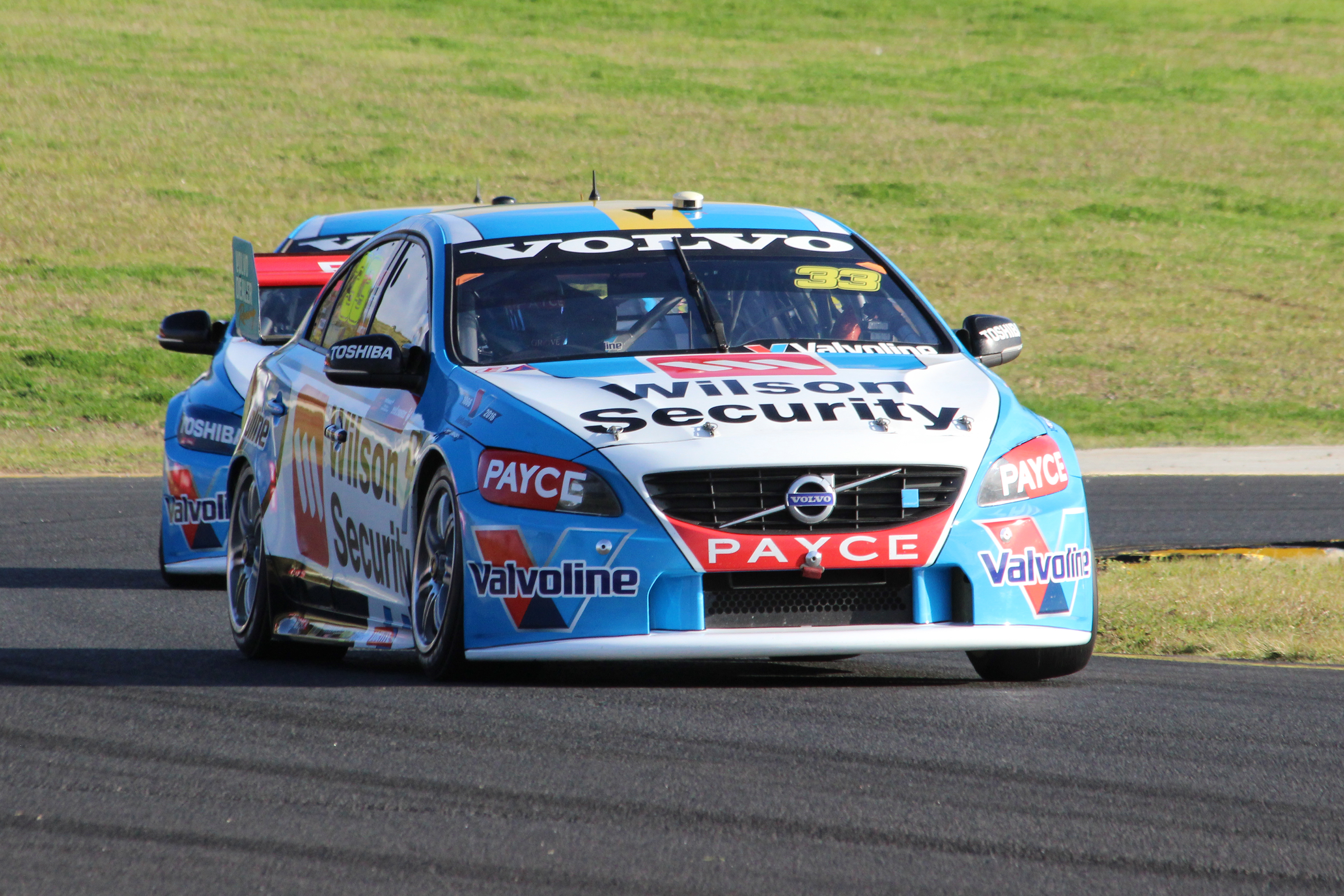
Scott McLaughlin set the fastest time in Friday practice.

Two one-hour practice sessions were held on Friday afternoon. Chaz Mostert set the fastest time in the first session, ahead of Tim Slade and Caruso. A number of endurance co-drivers completed laps: Matt Campbell for Nissan Motorsport; Cameron McConville for Lucas Dumbrell Motorsport; and Luke Youlden and Tony D'Alberto for DJR Team Penske. Light rain fell at the end of the session, preventing drivers from improving their times. The second session was topped by Scott McLaughlin with Van Gisbergen and Winterbottom completing the top three. Rick Kelly made contact with the wall at Turn 3 after the throttle became jammed open on his car. Despite sustaining only minor damage, he did not take part in the rest of the session as his team were unable to solve the throttle problem. The third and final practice session was held on Saturday afternoon and was 15 minutes in length. Winterbottom was fastest ahead of James Courtney and McLaughlin.

Practice summary
Session	Day	Fastest lap				
Session	Day	No.	Driver	Team	Car	Time
Practice 1	Friday	55	(Australia) Chaz Mostert	Rod Nash Racing	Ford FG X Falcon	1:30.3346
Practice 2	Friday	33	(New Zealand) Scott McLaughlin	Garry Rogers Motorsport	Volvo S60	1:29.7774
Practice 3	Saturday	1	(Australia) Mark Winterbottom	Prodrive Racing Australia	Ford FG X Falcon	1:29.5946

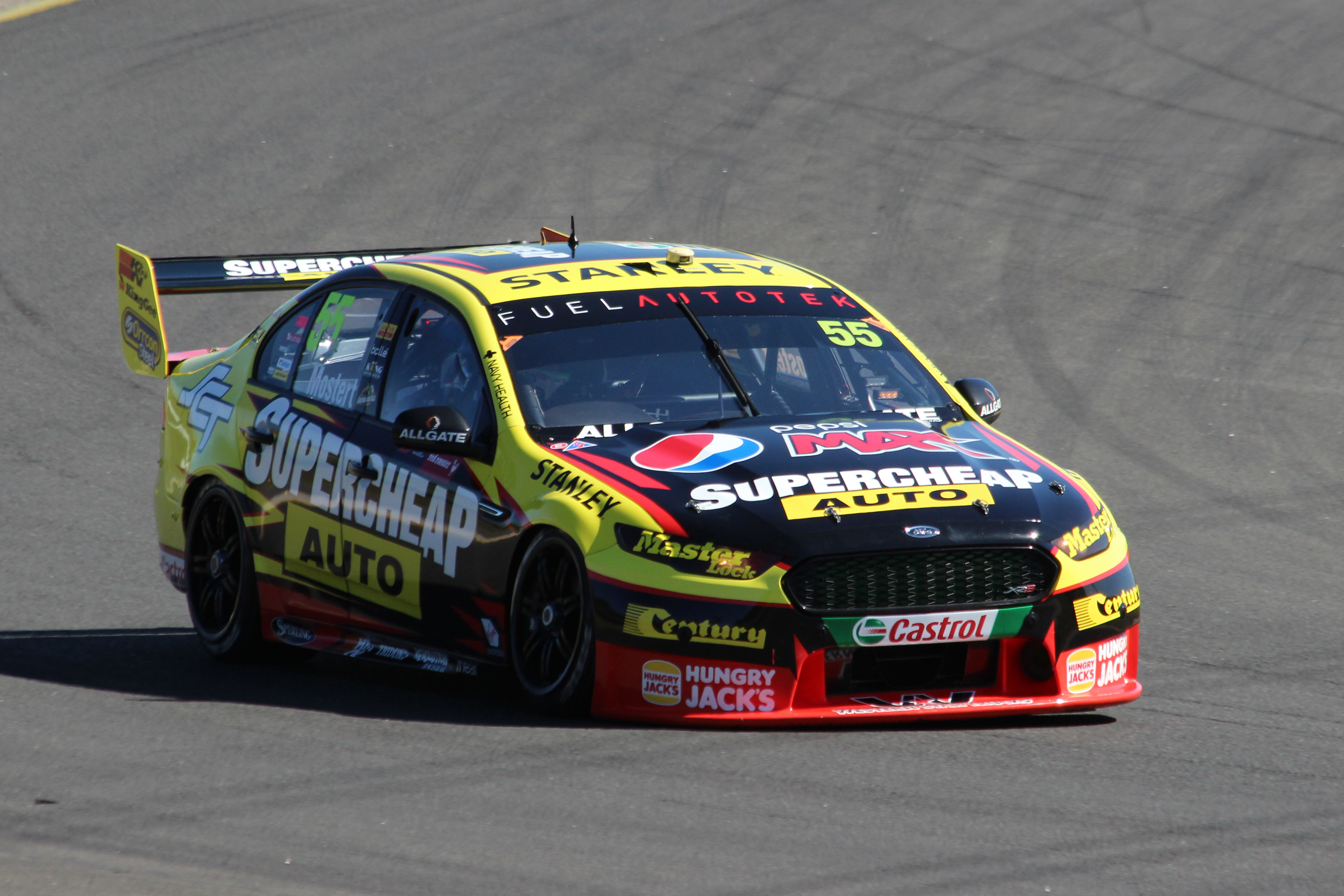
Chaz Mostert took his fourth pole position of the season in qualifying for Race 18.

=== Qualifying – Race 18 ===
Qualifying for Race 18 was a single 15-minute session held on Saturday afternoon. Reindler was forced to remain in the pit lane at the start of the session due to a problem with his car. Mostert took pole position by over two tenths of a second, setting a new qualifying lap record of 1:28.8272. Van Gisbergen and Whincup secured second and third ahead of Scott Pye, Courtney and Slade.

=== Race 18 ===
Race 18 took place on Saturday afternoon, with the regulations requiring each car to make at least one pit stop to change all four tyres. Mostert maintained the lead at the start but ran slightly wide at Turn 3, allowing Van Gisbergen to take the lead at Turn 4. Whincup also passed Mostert at Turn 6 on the first lap. Pye attempted to pass Mostert on lap 4, but both drivers ran wide and Courtney was able to take advantage and move into third place. Todd Kelly was the first driver to complete his pit stop, doing so at the end of lap 7. One lap later, Pye retired from the race with a power steering problem. Van Gisbergen stopped on lap 14, followed by Courtney and Mostert on lap 16. Whincup stayed out until lap 17, with the aim being to have fresher tyres than his rivals at the end of the race.

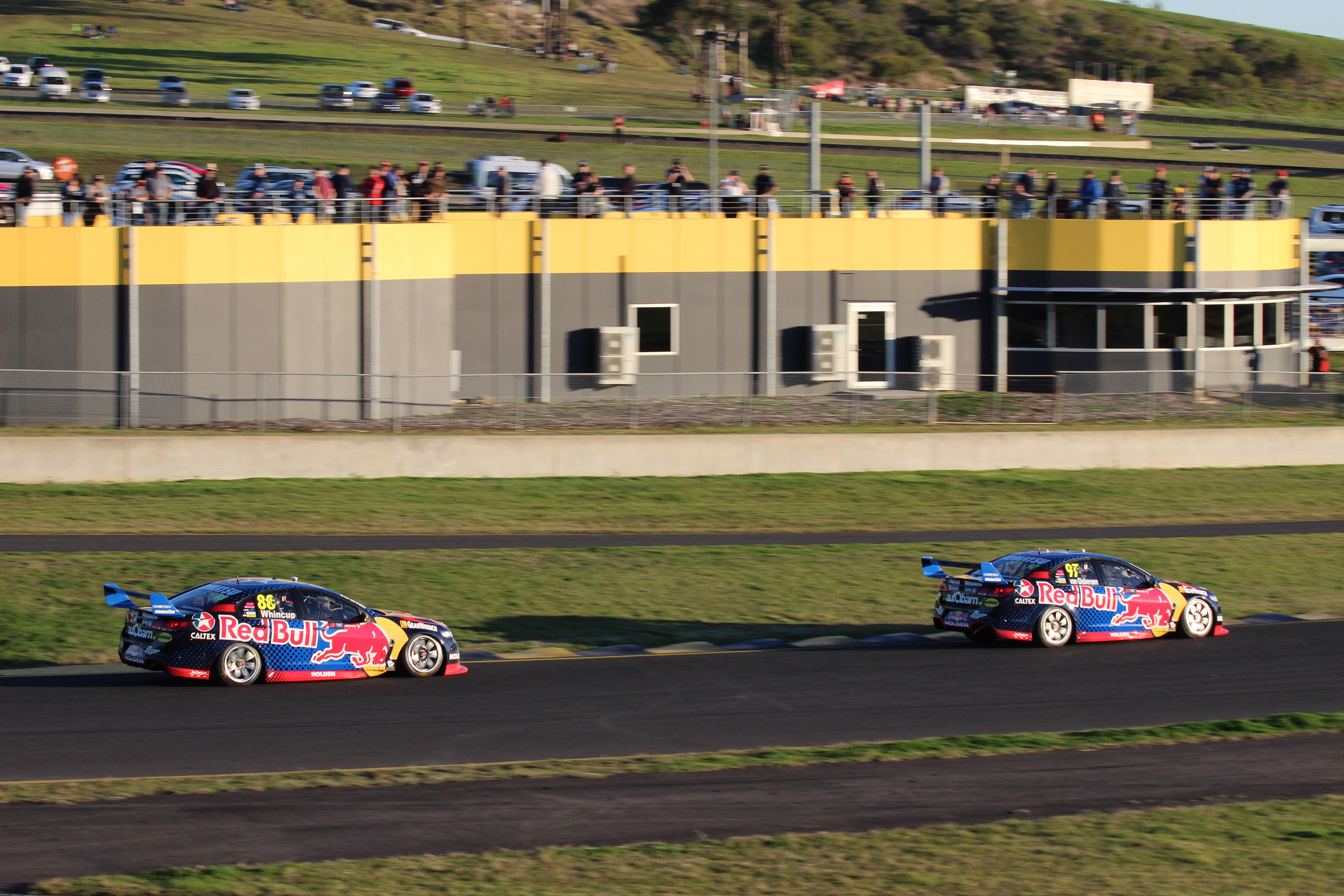
Shane van Gisbergen and Jamie Whincup scored a 1–2 finish for Triple EIght Race Engineering in Race 18.

After every driver had completed their pit stop, Van Gisbergen led from Whincup, McLaughlin, Craig Lowndes and Slade, with the tyre condition of each varying throughout the field. Courtney and Mostert used their younger tyres to move forwards and assume third and fourth position respectively by lap 26. Van Gisbergen and Whincup began battling for the lead in the closing stages, with the pair making slight contact at Turn 2 on lap 28. Smoke began issuing from the front-right corner of Whincup's car on the final lap; this was later revealed to be caused by rubber debris burning inside the brake disc. Van Gisbergen took victory by a quarter of a second over Whincup, with Courtney completing the podium ahead of Mostert, McLaughlin, Lowndes, Slade, Tander, Rick Kelly and Fabian Coulthard. Whincup's championship lead was reduced to 98 points, while Lowndes and Winterbottom became tied on points for third place after the latter finished eleventh.

==== Post-race ====
Nick Percat was penalised ten championship points, being charged with careless driving after making contact with Chris Pither during the race. DJR Team Penske changed the engine in Pye's car as it momentarily lost oil pressure when the power steering belt came off during the race.

=== Qualifying – Race 19 ===
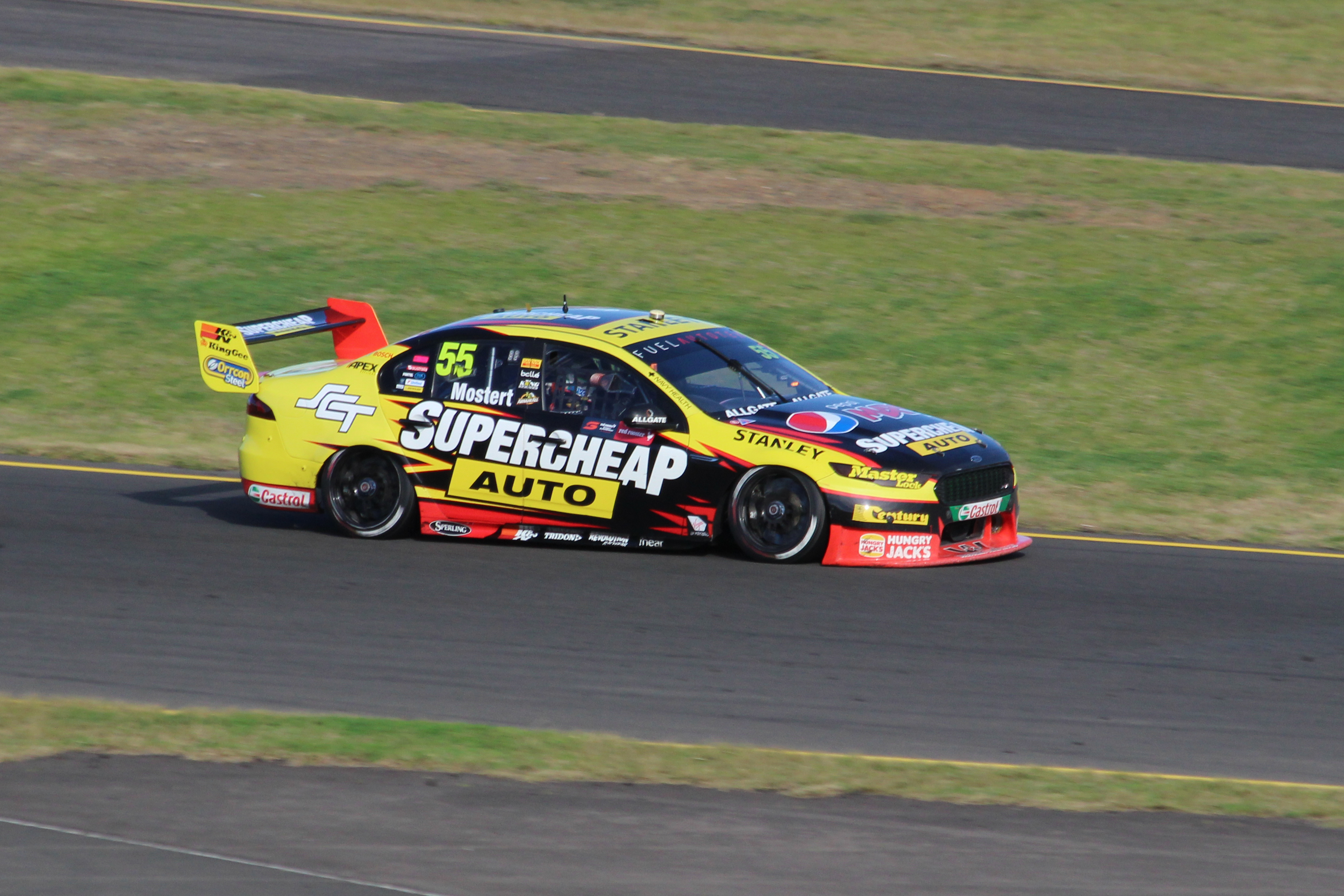
Chaz Mostert took his second pole position of the weekend in qualifying for Race 19.

Qualifying for Race 19 was held on Sunday morning and consisted of a single 20-minute session. The top three qualifiers were the same as in Race 18, with Mostert taking his second pole position of the weekend ahead of Van Gisbergen and Whincup. Lowndes qualified fourth fastest ahead of his 600th championship race start, while Garry Rogers Motorsport locked out the third row with McLaughlin ahead of James Moffat. Courtney triggered the kerb sensor, a timing loop used to stop drivers exceeding the track limits, at Turn 5 on his final lap and his time was deleted as a result, leaving him to start twelfth.

=== Race 19 ===
Race 19 was held on Sunday afternoon and the race regulations required each car to take on at least 120 litres of fuel during the race. The race was scheduled to be 52 laps in length, however this was reduced by one lap after a problem with the start lights led to an aborted start. Lowndes made a good start and moved into the lead around the outside of Mostert into the first corner, with Whincup in third ahead of Moffat, McLaughlin and Van Gisbergen. Winterbottom encountered a problem with his front-right tyre and was the first driver to complete a pit stop, doing so on lap 8. One lap later, Van Gisbergen was the first of the leaders to pit, followed by Lowndes and Whincup on lap 10. McLaughlin stopped on lap 12 while Mostert and Moffat stayed out until laps 15 and 16 respectively. After all drivers had completed their first pit stop, Lowndes led from Whincup, Van Gisbergen, Mostert and Moffat.

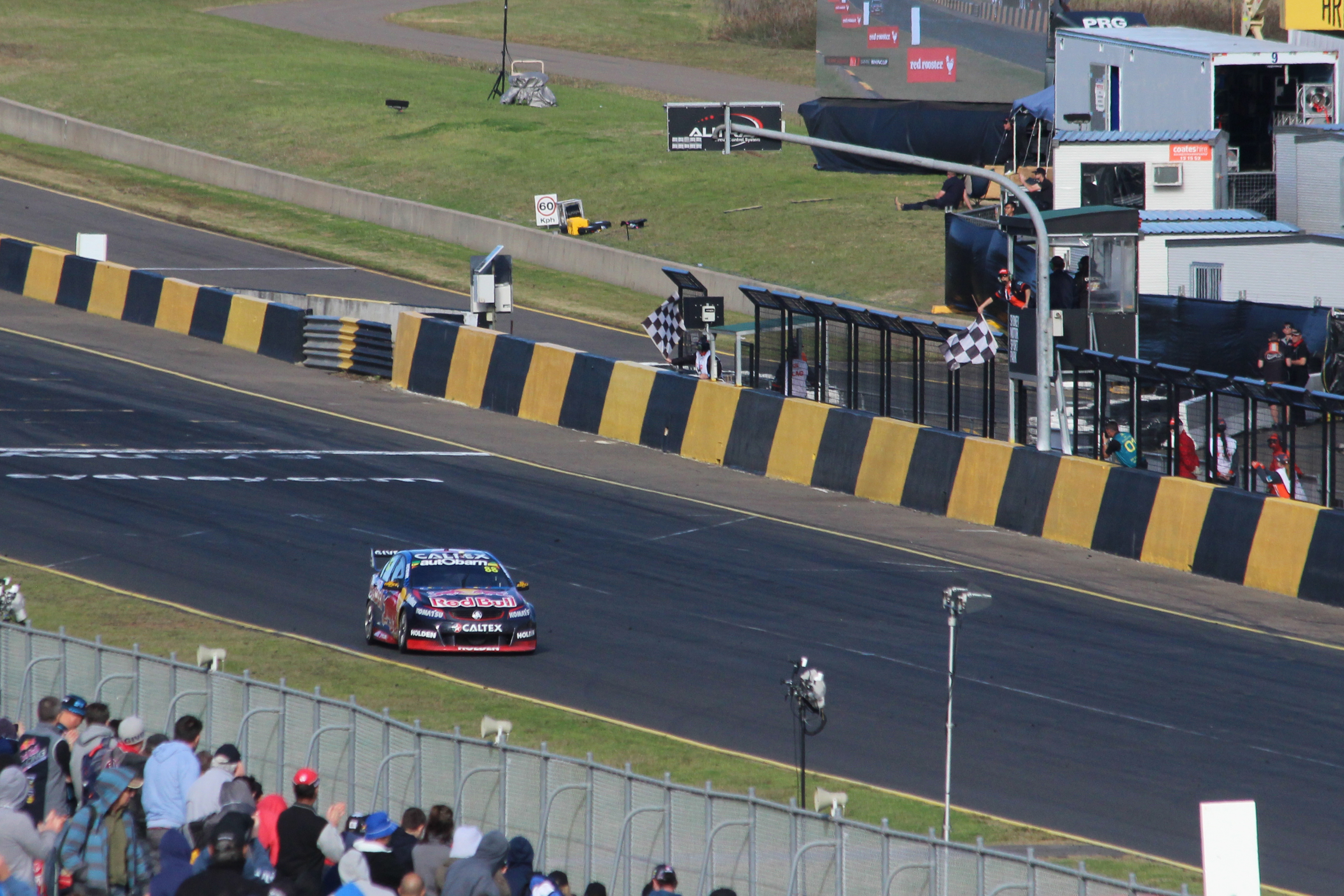
Jamie Whincup takes the chequered flag in Race 19 and his 100th win in the series.

The second round of pit stops began on lap 28 when Todd Kelly stopped; he was followed by McLaughlin and Pye on lap 29. Lowndes and Whincup stopped on lap 30, with a slightly faster pit stop for Whincup seeing him emerge ahead of his teammate. Mostert and Van Gisbergen pitted on the next lap, leaving Moffat in the lead until he stopped on lap 35. After Pither completed his second pit stop, Whincup led from Lowndes, Mostert, Van Gisbergen and McLaughlin. On fresher tyres, Moffat was able to move past McLaughlin before attempting to pass Van Gisbergen on lap 47. However, he lost control and hit the back of Van Gisbergen's car, sending him into a spin. Despite giving the place back, Moffat was given a drive-through penalty and dropped to 18th place. Whincup won the race, securing his 100th championship race victory, ahead of Lowndes and Mostert. Coulthard was fourth ahead of Van Gisbergen and McLaughlin. Tander, Courtney, Rick Kelly and Caruso completed the top ten. The results saw Whincup extend his championship lead over Van Gisbergen to 137 points, while Lowndes moved clear of Winterbottom for this place.

==== Post-race ====
In recognition of his 100th race win, Whincup was presented with a golden helmet by James Warburton, the series' CEO, prior to the podium ceremony. He became the second driver to reach the mark after his teammate Lowndes, who had taken his 100th victory during the 2015 season. Whincup said it was "an honour to join Lowndesy on the ton" and thanked his team, Triple Eight Race Engineering, saying: "It’s been just over 10 years since my first win and I’ve had every one with the same crew, so a massive thank you to everyone at Triple Eight."

Moffat was frustrated to have received a drive-through penalty for the incident with Van Gisbergen, claiming a lack of consistency from the race stewards. Moffat said: "I readdressed straight away but then the penalty came through...I’m a bit confused by that and it seems like the reaction in pitlane is very similar."

== Results ==
=== Race 18 ===
==== Qualifying ====
Pos.	No.	Driver	Team	Car	Time
1	55	(Australia) Chaz Mostert	Rod Nash Racing	Ford FG X Falcon	1:28.8272
2	97	(New Zealand) Shane van Gisbergen	Triple Eight Race Engineering	Holden VF Commodore	1:29.0806
3	88	(Australia) Jamie Whincup	Triple Eight Race Engineering	Holden VF Commodore	1:29.1480
4	17	(Australia) Scott Pye	DJR Team Penske	Ford FG X Falcon	1:29.2332
5	22	(Australia) James Courtney	Holden Racing Team	Holden VF Commodore	1:29.2376
6	14	(Australia) Tim Slade	Brad Jones Racing	Holden VF Commodore	1:29.2681
7	15	(Australia) Rick Kelly	Nissan Motorsport	Nissan Altima L33	1:29.3218
8	33	(New Zealand) Scott McLaughlin	Garry Rogers Motorsport	Volvo S60	1:29.3840
9	1	(Australia) Mark Winterbottom	Prodrive Racing Australia	Ford FG X Falcon	1:29.4445
10	888	(Australia) Craig Lowndes	Triple Eight Race Engineering	Holden VF Commodore	1:29.4604
11	2	(Australia) Garth Tander	Holden Racing Team	Holden VF Commodore	1:29.4971
12	12	(New Zealand) Fabian Coulthard	DJR Team Penske	Ford FG X Falcon	1:29.5567
13	19	(Australia) Will Davison	Tekno Autosports	Holden VF Commodore	1:29.5961
14	23	(Australia) Michael Caruso	Nissan Motorsport	Nissan Altima L33	1:29.6048
15	9	(Australia) David Reynolds	Erebus Motorsport	Holden VF Commodore	1:29.6489
16	34	(Australia) James Moffat	Garry Rogers Motorsport	Volvo S60	1:29.7075
17	111	(New Zealand) Chris Pither	Super Black Racing	Ford FG X Falcon	1:29.7508
18	8	(Australia) Jason Bright	Brad Jones Racing	Holden VF Commodore	1:29.7716
19	6	(Australia) Cam Waters	Prodrive Racing Australia	Ford FG X Falcon	1:29.9728
20	96	(Australia) Dale Wood	Nissan Motorsport	Nissan Altima L33	1:29.9759
21	222	(Australia) Nick Percat	Lucas Dumbrell Motorsport	Holden VF Commodore	1:30.1399
22	21	(Australia) Tim Blanchard	Britek Motorsport	Holden VF Commodore	1:30.1994
23	18	(Australia) Karl Reindler	Team 18	Holden VF Commodore	1:30.2592
24	7	(Australia) Todd Kelly	Nissan Motorsport	Nissan Altima L33	1:30.3869
25	3	(New Zealand) Andre Heimgartner	Lucas Dumbrell Motorsport	Holden VF Commodore	1:30.4903
26	4	(Australia) Shae Davies	Erebus Motorsport	Holden VF Commodore	1:30.8599

==== Race ====
Pos.	No.	Driver	Team	Car	Laps	Time/Retired	Grid	Points
1	97	(New Zealand) Shane van Gisbergen	Triple Eight Race Engineering	Holden VF Commodore	31	48:51.0408	2	150
2	88	(Australia) Jamie Whincup	Triple Eight Race Engineering	Holden VF Commodore	31	+0.2 s	3	138
3	22	(Australia) James Courtney	Holden Racing Team	Holden VF Commodore	31	+3.1 s	5	129
4	55	(Australia) Chaz Mostert	Rod Nash Racing	Ford FG X Falcon	31	+3.8 s	1	120
5	33	(New Zealand) Scott McLaughlin	Garry Rogers Motorsport	Volvo S60	31	+13.5 s	8	111
6	888	(Australia) Craig Lowndes	Triple Eight Race Engineering	Holden VF Commodore	31	+14.1 s	10	102
7	14	(Australia) Tim Slade	Brad Jones Racing	Holden VF Commodore	31	+15.0 s	6	96
8	2	(Australia) Garth Tander	Holden Racing Team	Holden VF Commodore	31	+15.1 s	11	90
9	15	(Australia) Rick Kelly	Nissan Motorsport	Nissan Altima L33	31	+23.1 s	7	84
10	12	(New Zealand) Fabian Coulthard	DJR Team Penske	Ford FG X Falcon	31	+23.4 s	12	78
11	1	(Australia) Mark Winterbottom	Prodrive Racing Australia	Ford FG X Falcon	31	+23.8 s	9	72
12	34	(Australia) James Moffat	Garry Rogers Motorsport	Volvo S60	31	+24.1 s	16	69
13	23	(Australia) Michael Caruso	Nissan Motorsport	Nissan Altima L33	31	+28.2 s	14	66
14	111	(New Zealand) Chris Pither	Super Black Racing	Ford FG X Falcon	31	+28.9 s	17	63
15	96	(Australia) Dale Wood	Nissan Motorsport	Nissan Altima L33	31	+31.5 s	20	60
16	222	(Australia) Nick Percat	Lucas Dumbrell Motorsport	Holden VF Commodore	31	+31.6 s	21	57
17	9	(Australia) David Reynolds	Erebus Motorsport	Holden VF Commodore	31	+33.5 s	15	54
18	8	(Australia) Jason Bright	Brad Jones Racing	Holden VF Commodore	31	+33.7 s	18	51
19	21	(Australia) Tim Blanchard	Britek Motorsport	Holden VF Commodore	31	+38.0 s	22	48
20	6	(Australia) Cam Waters	Prodrive Racing Australia	Ford FG X Falcon	31	+39.1 s	19	45
21	19	(Australia) Will Davison	Tekno Autosports	Holden VF Commodore	31	+39.3 s	13	42
22	18	(Australia) Karl Reindler	Team 18	Holden VF Commodore	31	+39.6 s	23	39
23	3	(New Zealand) Andre Heimgartner	Lucas Dumbrell Motorsport	Holden VF Commodore	31	+49.7 s	25	36
24	7	(Australia) Todd Kelly	Nissan Motorsport	Nissan Altima L33	31	+53.1 s	24	33
25	4	(Australia) Shae Davies	Erebus Motorsport	Holden VF Commodore	31	+53.6 s	26	30
Ret	17	(Australia) Scott Pye	DJR Team Penske	Ford FG X Falcon	8	Power steering	4	

=== Race 19 ===
==== Qualifying ====
Pos.	No.	Driver	Team	Car	Time
1	55	(Australia) Chaz Mostert	Rod Nash Racing	Ford FG X Falcon	1:29.4413
2	97	(New Zealand) Shane van Gisbergen	Triple Eight Race Engineering	Holden VF Commodore	1:29.4760
3	88	(Australia) Jamie Whincup	Triple Eight Race Engineering	Holden VF Commodore	1:29.5387
4	888	(Australia) Craig Lowndes	Triple Eight Race Engineering	Holden VF Commodore	1:29.6154
5	33	(New Zealand) Scott McLaughlin	Garry Rogers Motorsport	Volvo S60	1:29.6245
6	34	(Australia) James Moffat	Garry Rogers Motorsport	Volvo S60	1:29.7080
7	15	(Australia) Rick Kelly	Nissan Motorsport	Nissan Altima L33	1:29.7205
8	17	(Australia) Scott Pye	DJR Team Penske	Ford FG X Falcon	1:29.7233
9	23	(Australia) Michael Caruso	Nissan Motorsport	Nissan Altima L33	1:29.7393
10	12	(New Zealand) Fabian Coulthard	DJR Team Penske	Ford FG X Falcon	1:29.7547
11	1	(Australia) Mark Winterbottom	Prodrive Racing Australia	Ford FG X Falcon	1:29.7552
12	22	(Australia) James Courtney	Holden Racing Team	Holden VF Commodore	1:29.7810
13	2	(Australia) Garth Tander	Holden Racing Team	Holden VF Commodore	1:29.8115
14	6	(Australia) Cam Waters	Prodrive Racing Australia	Ford FG X Falcon	1:29.9348
15	7	(Australia) Todd Kelly	Nissan Motorsport	Nissan Altima L33	1:29.9914
16	111	(New Zealand) Chris Pither	Super Black Racing	Ford FG X Falcon	1:29.9978
17	14	(Australia) Tim Slade	Brad Jones Racing	Holden VF Commodore	1:30.0183
18	96	(Australia) Dale Wood	Nissan Motorsport	Nissan Altima L33	1:30.0970
19	19	(Australia) Will Davison	Tekno Autosports	Holden VF Commodore	1:30.1081
20	9	(Australia) David Reynolds	Erebus Motorsport	Holden VF Commodore	1:30.1682
21	8	(Australia) Jason Bright	Brad Jones Racing	Holden VF Commodore	1:30.1828
22	222	(Australia) Nick Percat	Lucas Dumbrell Motorsport	Holden VF Commodore	1:30.1839
23	21	(Australia) Tim Blanchard	Britek Motorsport	Holden VF Commodore	1:30.2048
24	3	(New Zealand) Andre Heimgartner	Lucas Dumbrell Motorsport	Holden VF Commodore	1:30.5167
25	4	(Australia) Shae Davies	Erebus Motorsport	Holden VF Commodore	1:30.8182
26	18	(Australia) Karl Reindler	Team 18	Holden VF Commodore	1:32.7655

==== Race ====
Pos.	No.	Driver	Team	Car	Laps	Time/Retired	Grid	Points
1	88	(Australia) Jamie Whincup	Triple Eight Race Engineering	Holden VF Commodore	51	1:20:45.1664	3	150
2	888	(Australia) Craig Lowndes	Triple Eight Race Engineering	Holden VF Commodore	51	+2.7 s	4	138
3	55	(Australia) Chaz Mostert	Rod Nash Racing	Ford FG X Falcon	51	+8.1 s	1	129
4	12	(New Zealand) Fabian Coulthard	DJR Team Penske	Ford FG X Falcon	51	+15.4 s	10	120
5	97	(New Zealand) Shane van Gisbergen	Triple Eight Race Engineering	Holden VF Commodore	51	+21.6 s	2	111
6	33	(New Zealand) Scott McLaughlin	Garry Rogers Motorsport	Volvo S60	51	+23.8 s	5	102
7	2	(Australia) Garth Tander	Holden Racing Team	Holden VF Commodore	51	+25.7 s	13	96
8	22	(Australia) James Courtney	Holden Racing Team	Holden VF Commodore	51	+26.1 s	12	90
9	7	(Australia) Todd Kelly	Nissan Motorsport	Nissan Altima L33	51	+45.1 s	15	84
10	23	(Australia) Michael Caruso	Nissan Motorsport	Nissan Altima L33	51	+45.3 s	9	78
11	15	(Australia) Rick Kelly	Nissan Motorsport	Nissan Altima L33	51	+45.8 s	7	72
12	14	(Australia) Tim Slade	Brad Jones Racing	Holden VF Commodore	51	+46.1 s	17	69
13	111	(New Zealand) Chris Pither	Super Black Racing	Ford FG X Falcon	51	+46.3 s	16	66
14	1	(Australia) Mark Winterbottom	Prodrive Racing Australia	Ford FG X Falcon	51	+47.4 s	11	63
15	17	(Australia) Scott Pye	DJR Team Penske	Ford FG X Falcon	51	+49.3 s	8	60
16	6	(Australia) Cam Waters	Prodrive Racing Australia	Ford FG X Falcon	51	+51.5 s	14	57
17	8	(Australia) Jason Bright	Brad Jones Racing	Holden VF Commodore	51	+57.8 s	21	54
18	34	(Australia) James Moffat	Garry Rogers Motorsport	Volvo S60	51	+58.1 s	6	51
19	9	(Australia) David Reynolds	Erebus Motorsport	Holden VF Commodore	51	+58.7 s	20	48
20	222	(Australia) Nick Percat	Lucas Dumbrell Motorsport	Holden VF Commodore	51	+59.6 s	22	45
21	96	(Australia) Dale Wood	Nissan Motorsport	Nissan Altima L33	51	+1:00.3	18	42
22	21	(Australia) Tim Blanchard	Britek Motorsport	Holden VF Commodore	51	+1:00.7	23	39
23	18	(Australia) Karl Reindler	Team 18	Holden VF Commodore	51	+1:05.0	26	36
24	3	(New Zealand) Andre Heimgartner	Lucas Dumbrell Motorsport	Holden VF Commodore	51	+1:05.2	24	33
25	4	(Australia) Shae Davies	Erebus Motorsport	Holden VF Commodore	51	+1:22.0	25	30
26	19	(Australia) Will Davison	Tekno Autosports	Holden VF Commodore	50	+1 lap	19	27

== Championship standings after the event ==
- After Race 19 of 29. Only the top five positions are included for both sets of standings.

Drivers' Championship standings

	Pos.	Driver	Points
	1	(Australia) Jamie Whincup	2109
	2	(New Zealand) Shane van Gisbergen	1972
1	3	(Australia) Craig Lowndes	1911
1	4	(Australia) Mark Winterbottom	1836
	5	(New Zealand) Scott McLaughlin	1749

Teams' Championship standings

	Pos.	Constructor	Points
	1	Triple Eight Race Engineering	4091
	2	Prodrive Racing Australia	2854
2	3	Holden Racing Team	2782
1	4	Garry Rogers Motorsport	2751
1	5	Brad Jones Racing	2673
