= Jeff Grech =

Australian motorsport team manager

Personal information
- Nationality: Australian

Sport
- Country: Australia
- Sport: Australian Touring Car racing (1982-1996); Supercars Championship (1997-2009, 2016-2018)
- Team: Holden Dealer Team (1982-1985); Volvo Dealer Team (1986); Perkins Engineering (1986-1990); Gibson Motorsport (1991-1993); Holden Racing Team (1993-2006); Paul Weel Racing (2006-2007); Tasman Motorsport (2007-2009); Team 18 (2016-2018)

Jeff Grech is a motorsport team manager currently managing Winton Motor Raceway in Australia.

== Career ==
Jeff Grech joined the Holden Dealer Team in 1982 as a mechanic. He moved to the Volvo Dealer Team in 1986 and later in the same year to Perkins Engineering. In 1990 he joined Gibson Motorsport as team manager before joining the Holden Racing Team in 1993. In his time at the Holden Racing Team, the squad became the dominant team in the championship, winning six drivers' championships and four Bathurst 1000s. He moved to Paul Weel Racing in 2006 and Tasman Motorsport in 2007 before leaving the sport at the end of 2009.

In 2016 Grech returned to V8 Supercars as team manager of Team 18 until the end of 2018. In 2019, Grech was appointed manager of Winton Motor Raceway.
