= Team 18 =

Australian Motor Racing Team

- Manufacturer: Chevrolet
- Team Principal: Adrian Burgess
- Race Drivers: 18. Anton De Pasquale; 20. David Reynolds
- Race Engineers: 18. Andrew Donnelly; 20. Richard Hollway
- Chassis: Camaro ZL1
- Debut: 2013
- Drivers' Championships: 0
- Round wins: 0
- Race wins: 2
- 2020 position: 2
- 6th (3122 pts)

Team 18 (formerly known as Charlie Schwerkolt Racing) is an Australian motor racing team currently competing in the Supercars Championship, running two Chevrolet Camaro ZL1s. The team's current drivers are Anton De Pasquale and David Reynolds.

== History ==
=== Background ===
The team is owned by Gold Coast businessman Charlie Schwerkolt, who previously had a shareholding in Dick Johnson Racing. The relationship between Schwerkolt and Dick Johnson broke down at the end of 2010, the year James Courtney won the championship for the team. As part of the split Schwerkolt retained ownership of one of the two Racing Entitlement Contracts (RECs).

Schwerkolt had attempted to conclude a deal to run a fourth car out of Ford Performance Racing with Courtney driving, but after Courtney signed to drive with the Holden Racing Team, the deal collapsed. The REC was instead leased to Dick Johnson Racing for James Moffat's entry for the 2011 and 2012 seasons.

=== Satellite team ===
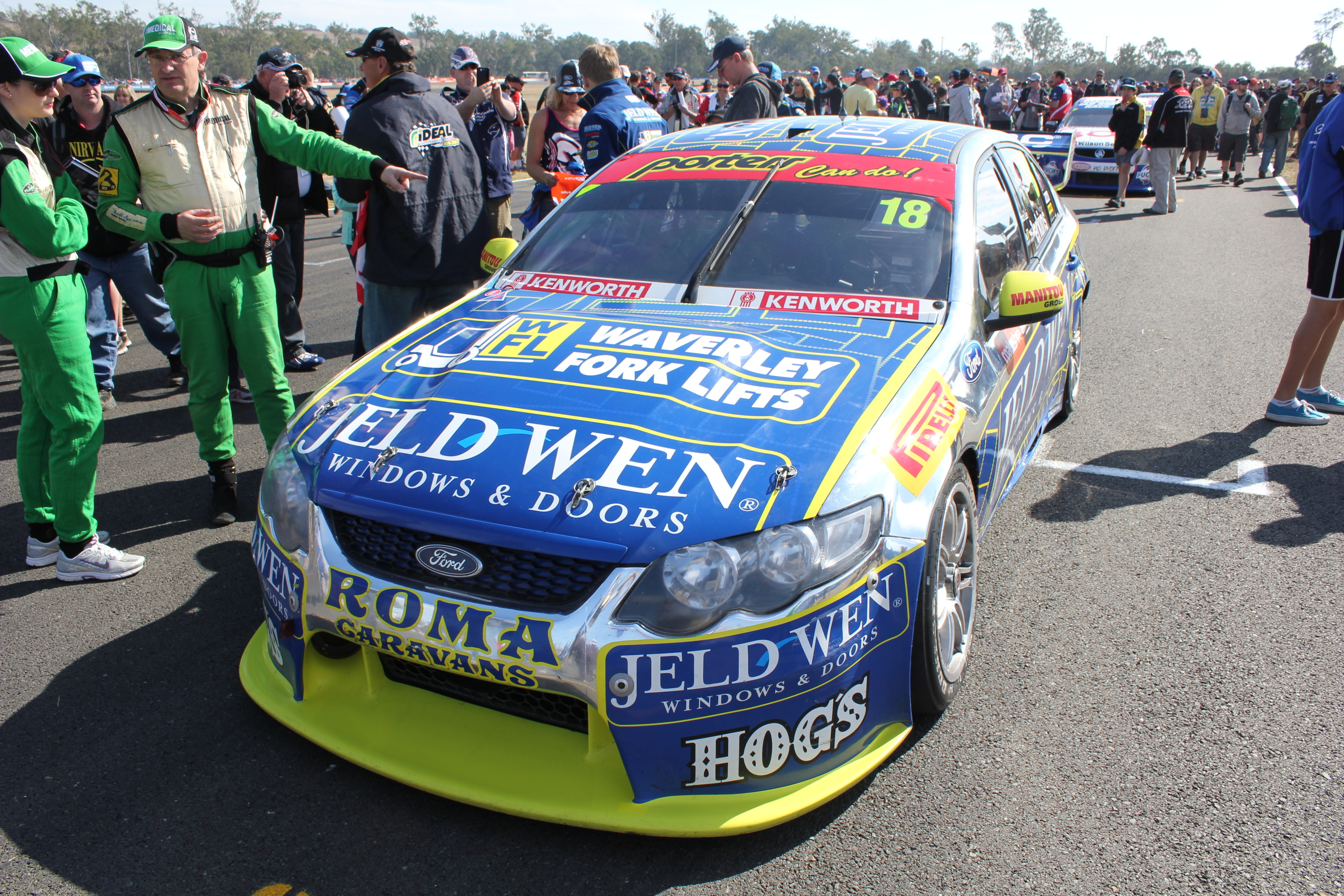
The Ford FG Falcon as driven in 2014 by Jack Perkins

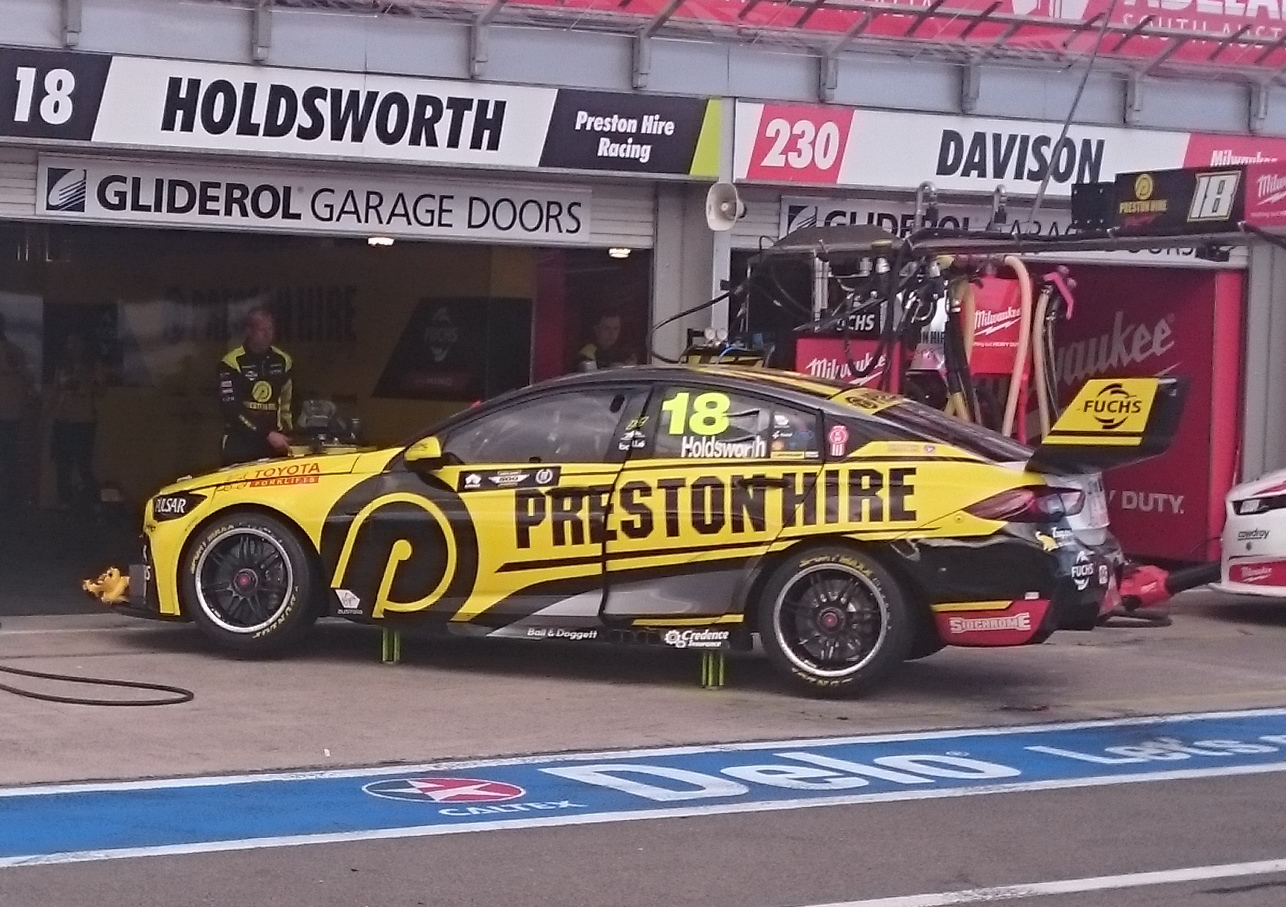
Holden Commodore ZB driven by Lee Holdsworth for Team 18 in the 2018 Virgin Australia Supercars Championship

With the rules governing the use of Racing Entitlement Contracts dictating that Schwerkolt could only lease his to one party for two years, he either had to sell it, lease it to another party, or use it himself. Schwerkolt decided on the latter and came to an agreement with Ford Performance Racing to operate a fully supported customer car as a satellite of the main FPR team in much the same manner as Rod Nash Racing. Alex Davison drove the Jeld-Wen supported car in 2013, taking one podium at the Phillip Island event and finishing the season in 13th. In 2014, Jack Perkins replaced Davison but could only manage 23rd in the championship.

For 2015, Lee Holdsworth became the team's driver. The team had originally intended to remain in their existing relationship with Ford Performance Racing (now known as Tickford Racing), but they were replaced by Super Black Racing as the Ford team's second customer partnership. Instead, the team became a satellite team to the Holden Racing Team, and ran a Holden VF Commodore. Holdsworth finished 14th in the championship.

=== Independent team ===
In 2016, Team 18 began operating as an independent entity using a Triple Eight Race Engineering-built Commodore. Jeff Grech, the former Holden Racing Team team manager from 1993 to 2006, became team manager with backing from Preston Hire. It was a difficult season for the outfit, with Holdsworth suffering a major accident at the Darwin event, leaving him with a fractured pelvis and out of action for three rounds. He was replaced with Kurt Kostecki for Townsville and Ipswich (having borrowed the teenagers' Development Series chassis) and Karl Reindler for Sydney Motorsport Park. The team did not fare well in Holdsworth's return for the Enduro Cup either, retiring from the Bathurst 1000 after two laps with a broken rocker, as well as one of the Gold Coast 600 races after Reindler crashed exiting turn three. The team finished 15th in the teams' championship, beating only Britek Motorsport and the 'Supergirls' wildcard.

Holdsworth remained at the team for 2017, starting with two midfield finishes at the Adelaide 500 before being involved in a high-speed crash with Nick Percat at the non-championship round at the Australian Grand Prix, after Percat lost braking entering turn one. The team avoided the multi-car pile-up in Tasmania, however, were caught out in the changeable conditions on the Sunday, finishing 17th. The team continued to run midfield throughout the season, Holdsworth ending the season 16th in the standings with a best result of 4th on the Saturday at the Newcastle 500. Holdsworth did not finish in the top ten again until one year later in Newcastle, enduring a difficult 2018 campaign that was hampered by reliability issues, ending up in 21st in the championship.

Ahead of the 2019 Supercars Championship, the team acquired the services of 2015 series champion Mark Winterbottom, in what became a switch of seats with Holdsworth going to Tickford Racing. As part of Winterbottom's arrival, the team also re-branded with backing from Stanley Black & Decker's Irwin Industrial Tools, hired new staff including team manager Steve Henderson and engineer Phil Keed and upgraded their customer relationship with Triple Eight Race Engineering. The changes brought an immediate upturn in results with two top-ten finishes at the Adelaide 500 before Winterbottom took the team's first pole position at the Tasmania SuperSprint. In 2020 the team expanded to two cars with a second REC purchased from Kelly Racing, again with backing from Stanley Black & Decker, this time from their DeWalt brand with Scott Pye recruited from Walkinshaw Andretti United.

Following the demise of Holden, Team 18 continued with General Motors for the Gen3 era starting in 2023, with the Holden Commodore replaced by the Chevrolet Camaro. In 2023, Winterbottom achieved the team's first ever race victory, in Race 13 of the championship at the Darwin Triple Crown.

David Reynolds replaced Pye in car 20 for the 2024 season, and Anton De Pasquale replaced Winterbottom in car 18 for the 2025 season. The team achieved their first ever podium at the Bathurst 1000 in 2025, with Reynolds and Holdsworth, who had returned to the team as a co-driver, finishing second.

Ahead of the 2026 season, Team 18 became the homologation team for Chevrolet, following Triple Eight Race Engineering's defection to Ford. The team also took over the Supercheap Auto wildcard program that Triple Eight had operated in endurance races since 2021, which Craig Lowndes had been the face of, after Lowndes decided he wished to remain with Chevrolet. Early in the 2026 season, De Pasquale established himself as the leading Chevrolet driver, including taking pole position and winning Race 2 of the championship in the first round at Sydney Motorsport Park, and winning again in Race 19 at Hidden Valley Raceway.

== Supercars Championship drivers ==
The following is a list of drivers who have driven for the team in the Supercars Championship, in order of their first appearance. Drivers who only drove for the team on a part-time basis are listed in italics.

- (Australia) Alex Davison (2013)
- (New Zealand) John McIntyre (2013)
- (Australia) Jack Perkins (2014)
- (Australia) Cam Waters (2014)
- (Australia) Lee Holdsworth (2015–18, 2025–present)
- (France) Sébastien Bourdais (2015)
- (Australia) Kurt Kostecki (2016)
- (Australia) Karl Reindler (2016–17)
- (Australia) Jason Bright (2018)
- (Australia) Mark Winterbottom (2019–2024)
- (New Zealand) Steven Richards (2019)
- (Australia) Scott Pye (2020–2023)
- (Australia) James Golding (2020–2021)
- (Australia) Dean Fiore (2020)
- (Australia) Michael Caruso (2021–2024)
- (Australia) Tyler Everingham (2022)
- (Australia) Warren Luff (2023)
- (Australia) David Reynolds (2024–present)
- (Australia) Anton De Pasquale (2025–present)
- (Australia) Harri Jones (2025)
- (Australia) Craig Lowndes (2026–present)
- (Australia) James Courtney (2026–present)
- (Australia) Bayley Hall (2026–present)

=== Complete Bathurst 1000 results ===
Year	No.	Car	Drivers	Position	Laps
2013	18	Ford Falcon FG	(Australia) Alex Davison (New Zealand) John McIntyre	13th	161
2014	18	Ford Falcon FG	(Australia) Jack Perkins (Australia) Cam Waters	12th	161
2015	18	Holden Commodore VF	(Australia) Lee Holdsworth (France) Sébastien Bourdais	9th	161
2016	18	Holden Commodore VF	(Australia) Lee Holdsworth (Australia) Karl Reindler	DNF	2
2017	18	Holden Commodore VF	(Australia) Lee Holdsworth (Australia) Karl Reindler	DNF	76
2018	18	Holden Commodore ZB	(Australia) Lee Holdsworth (Australia) Jason Bright	21st	157
2019	18	Holden Commodore ZB	(Australia) Mark Winterbottom (New Zealand) Steven Richards	6th	161
2020	18	Holden Commodore ZB	(Australia) Mark Winterbottom (Australia) James Golding	8th	161
2020	20	Holden Commodore ZB	(Australia) Scott Pye (Australia) Dean Fiore	6th	161
2021	18	Holden Commodore ZB	(Australia) Mark Winterbottom (Australia) Michael Caruso	16th	161
2021	20	Holden Commodore ZB	(Australia) Scott Pye (Australia) James Golding	DNF	3
2022	18	Holden Commodore ZB	(Australia) Mark Winterbottom (Australia) Michael Caruso	15th	161
2022	20	Holden Commodore ZB	(Australia) Scott Pye (Australia) Tyler Everingham	16th	161
2023	18	Chevrolet Camaro ZL1-1LE	(Australia) Mark Winterbottom (Australia) Michael Caruso	DNF	160
2023	20	Chevrolet Camaro ZL1-1LE	(Australia) Scott Pye (Australia) Warren Luff	17th	160
2024	18	Chevrolet Camaro ZL1-1LE	(Australia) Mark Winterbottom (Australia) Michael Caruso	18th	161
2024	20	Chevrolet Camaro ZL1-1LE	(Australia) David Reynolds (Australia) Warren Luff	24th	159
2025	18	Chevrolet Camaro ZL1-1LE	(Australia) Anton De Pasquale (Australia) Harri Jones	20th	141
2025	20	Chevrolet Camaro ZL1-1LE	(Australia) David Reynolds (Australia) Lee Holdsworth	2nd	161
2026	15	Chevrolet Camaro ZL1-1LE	(Australia) Craig Lowndes (Australia) Bayley Hall	10th	161
2026	18	Chevrolet Camaro ZL1-1LE	(Australia) Anton De Pasquale (Australia) Lee Holdsworth	DNF	160
2026	20	Chevrolet Camaro ZL1-1LE	(Australia) David Reynolds (Australia) James Courtney	17th	160

=== Car results ===
==== Car No. 18 results ====
Year	Driver	No.	Make	1	2	3	4	5	6	7	8	9	10	11	12	13	14	15	16	17	18	19	20	21	22	23	24	25	26	27	28	29	30	31	32	33	34	35	36	37	38	39	40	Position	Pts
2015	Lee Holdsworth	Holden	18	ADE; R1; 9	ADE; R2; 10	ADE; R3; Ret	SYM; R4; 22	SYM; R5; 11	SYM; R6; 16	BAR; R7; 14	BAR; R8; 14	BAR; R9; 17	WIN; R10; 18	WIN; R11; Ret	WIN; R12; 15	HID; R13; 13	HID; R14; 18	HID; R15; 18	TOW; R16; 13	TOW; R17; 7	QLD; R18; 15	QLD; R19; 21	QLD; R20; 18	SMP; R21; 14	SMP; R22; 7	SMP; R23; 13	SAN; QR; 7	SAN; R24; 7	BAT; R25; 9	SUR; R26; Ret	SUR; R27; 14	PUK; R28; 13	PUK; R29; 16	PUK; R30; 8	PHI; R31; 16	PHI; R32; 18	PHI; R33; Ret	SYD; R34; 18	SYD; R35; 10	SYD; R36; 7				14th	1699
2016	Lee Holdsworth	Holden	18	ADE; R1; 23	ADE; R2; 21	ADE; R3; 18	SYM; R4; 12	SYM; R5; 9	PHI; R6; 15	PHI; R7; 19	BAR; R8; 15	BAR; R9; 12	WIN; R10; 10	WIN; R11; Ret	HID; R12; 8	HID; R13; Ret	TOW; R14	TOW; R15	QLD; R16	QLD; R17	SMP; R18	SMP; R19	SAN; QR; 15	SAN; R20; 12	BAT; R21; Ret	SUR; R22; Ret	SUR; R23; 7	PUK; R24; 15	PUK; R25; 19	PUK; R26; 14	PUK; R27; 15	SYD; R28; 16	SYD; R29; 15											24th	1114
2016	Kurt Kostecki	Holden	18	ADE; R1	ADE; R2	ADE; R3	SYM; R4	SYM; R5	PHI; R6	PHI; R7	BAR; R8	BAR; R9	WIN; R10	WIN; R11	HID; R12	HID; R13	TOW; R14; 25	TOW; R15; Ret	QLD; R16; 23	QLD; R17; 21	SMP; R18	SMP; R19	SAN; R20	BAT; R21	SUR; R22	SUR; R23	PUK; R24	PUK; R25	PUK; R26	PUK; R27	SYD; R28	SYD; R29												55th	108
2016	Karl Reindler	Holden	18	ADE; R1	ADE; R2	ADE; R3	SYM; R4	SYM; R5	PHI; R6	PHI; R7	BAR; R8	BAR; R9	WIN; R10	WIN; R11	HID; R12	HID; R13	TOW; R14	TOW; R15	QLD; R16	QLD; R17	SMP; R18; 22	SMP; R19; 23	SAN; R20	BAT; R21	SUR; R22	SUR; R23	PUK; R24	PUK; R25	PUK; R26	PUK; R27	SYD; R28	SYD; R29												45th	309
2017	Lee Holdsworth	Holden	18	ADE; R1; 13	ADE; R2; 18	SYM; R3; 12	SYM; R4; 17	PHI; R5; 22	PHI; R6; 5	BAR; R7; 15	BAR; R8; 20	WIN; R9; 11	WIN; R10; 10	HID; R11; 10	HID; R12; 12	TOW; R13; 11	TOW; R14; 15	QLD; R15; 12	QLD; R16; 20	SMP; R17; 15	SMP; R18; 15	SAN; QR; 12	SAN; R19; 8	BAT; R20; Ret	SUR; R21; Ret	SUR; R22; 8	PUK; R23; 10	PUK; R24; Ret	NEW; R25; 4	NEW; R26; 8														16th	1647
2018	Lee Holdsworth	Holden	18	ADE; R1; 12	ADE; R2; 24	MEL; R3; 19	MEL; R4; 15	MEL; R5; 19	MEL; R6; 23	SYM; R7; 11	SYM; R8; 23	PHI; R9; 22	PHI; R10; 25	BAR; R11; 23	BAR; R12; 18	WIN; R13; 23	WIN; R14; 21	HID; R15; 21	HID; R16; Ret	TOW; R17; 18	TOW; R18; 15	QLD; R19; 24	QLD; R20; 21	SMP; R21; 12	BEN; R22; 20	BEN; R23; Ret	SAN; QR; 21	SAN; R24; 23	BAT; R25; 21	SUR; R26; 15	SUR; R27; C	PUK; R28; 15	PUK; R29; 14	NEW; R30; 12	NEW; R31; 9									21st	1443
2019	Mark Winterbottom	Holden	18	ADE; R1; 9	ADE; R2; 6	MEL; R3; 12	MEL; R4; 11	MEL; R5; 13	MEL; R6; 6	SYM; R7; 4	SYM; R8; 6	PHI; R9; 21	PHI; R10; 17	BAR; R11; 18	BAR; R12; 15	WIN; R13; 9	WIN; R14; 22	HID; R15; 17	HID; R16; 12	TOW; R17; 9	TOW; R18; Ret	QLD; R19; 15	QLD; R20; 10	BEN; R21; 4	BEN; R22; 23	PUK; R23; 22	PUK; R24; 8	BAT; R25; 6	SUR; R26; 12	SUR; R27; 19	SAN; QR; 15	SAN; R28; 12	NEW; R29; 10	NEW; R30; 14										13th	2092
2020	Mark Winterbottom	Holden	18	ADE; R1; 8	ADE; R2; 11	MEL; R3; C	MEL; R4; C	MEL; R5; C	MEL; R6; C	SMP1; R7; 9	SMP1; R8; 8	SMP1; R9; 5	SMP2; R10; 10	SMP2; R11; 14	SMP2; R12; 6	HID1; R13; 4	HID1; R14; 11	HID1; R15; 7	HID2; R16; 11	HID2; R17; 9	HID2; R18; 4	TOW1; R19; 12	TOW1; R20; 17	TOW1; R21; 10	TOW2; R22; 14	TOW2; R23; 9	TOW2; R24; 13	BEN1; R25; 17	BEN1; R26; 15	BEN1; R27; Ret	BEN2; R28; 8	BEN2; R29; 12	BEN2; R30; 16	BAT; R31; 8										10th	1566
2021	Mark Winterbottom	Holden	18	BAT; R1; 4	BAT; R2; 5	SAN; R3; 4	SAN; R4; 11	SAN; R5; 10	SYM; R6; 7	SYM; R7; 7	SYM; R8; 11	BEN; R9; 25	BEN; R10; 9	BEN; R11; 18	HID; R12; 22	HID; R13; 5	HID; R14; 7	TOW1; R15; 10	TOW1; R16; 16	TOW2; R17; 20	TOW2; R18; 10	TOW2; R19; 8	SYD1; R20; 12	SYD1; R21; 17	SYD1; R22; 10	SYD2; R23; 18	SYD2; R24; 10	SYD2; R25; 15	SYD3; R26; 13	SYD3; R27; 6	SYD3; R28; 19	SYD4; R29; 12	SYD4; R30; C	BAT; R31; 16										10th	1725
2022	Mark Winterbottom	Holden	18	SMP; R1; 16	SMP; R2; 12	SYM; R3; 18	SYM; R4; 6	SYM; R5; 7	MEL; R6; 7	MEL; R7; 12	MEL; R8; 17	MEL; R9; 9	BAR; R10; 14	BAR; R11; 16	BAR; R12; 20	WIN; R13; 21	WIN; R14; 9	WIN; R15; 9	HID; R16; 5	HID; R17; 7	HID; R18; 9	TOW; R19; 25	TOW; R20; 10	BEN; R21; 16	BEN; R22; 9	BEN; R23; 15	SAN; R24; 8	SAN; R25; 12	SAN; R26; 5	PUK; R27; 11	PUK; R28; 22	PUK; R29; 12	BAT; R30; 15	SUR; R31; 9	SUR; R32; 6	ADE; R33; 6	ADE; R34; 11							9th	1909
2023	Mark Winterbottom	Chevrolet	18	NEW; R1; 6	NEW; R2; 10	MEL; R3; 21	MEL; R4; 9	MEL; R5; Ret	MEL; R6; 19	BAR; R7; 18	BAR; R8; 18	BAR; R9; 19	SYM; R10; 12	SYM; R11; 13	SYM; R12; 8	HID; R13; 1	HID; R14; 18	HID; R15; 7	TOW; R16; 11	TOW; R17; 7	SMP; R18; 9	SMP; R19; 9	BEN; R20; 17	BEN; R21; 17	BEN; R22; 24	SAN; R23; 11	BAT; R24; Ret	SUR; R25; 12	SUR; R26; 9	ADE; R27; 11	ADE; R28; 15													15th	1579
2024	Mark Winterbottom	Chevrolet	18	BAT1; R1; 12	BAT1; R2; 14	MEL; R3; 11	MEL; R4; 2	MEL; R5; 13	MEL; R6; 13	TAU; R7; 11	TAU; R8; 17	WAN; R9; 16	WAN; R10; 20	HID; R11; 2	HID; R12; 19	TOW; R13; 13	TOW; R14; 8	SMP; R15; 24	SMP; R16; 13	SYM; R17; 18	SYM; R18; 9	SAN; R19; 16	BAT2; R20; 18	SUR; R21; 13	SUR; R22; 12	ADE; R23; 17	ADE; R24; 20																	15th	1557
2025	Anton De Pasquale	Chevrolet	18	SMP; R1; 8	SMP; R2; 7	SMP; R3; 7	MEL; R4; 7	MEL; R5; 8	MEL; R6; 7	MEL; R7; C	TAU; R8; 4	TAU; R9; 20	TAU; R10; 16	SYM; R11; 17	SYM; R12; 17	SYM; R13; 23	WAN; R14; 19	WAN; R15; 9	WAN; R16; 18	HID; R17; 14	HID; R18; 2	HID; R19; 7	TOW; R20; 3	TOW; R21; 6	TOW; R22; 6	QLD; R23; 8	QLD; R24; 4	QLD; R25; 8	BEN; R26	BAT; R27	SUR; R28	SUR; R29	SAN; R30	SAN; R31	ADE; R32	ADE; R33	ADE; R34								

==== Car No. 20 results ====
Year	Driver	No.	Make	1	2	3	4	5	6	7	8	9	10	11	12	13	14	15	16	17	18	19	20	21	22	23	24	25	26	27	28	29	30	31	32	33	34	35	36	37	38	39	40	Position	Pts
2020	Scott Pye	Holden	20	ADE; R1; 15	ADE; R2; Ret	MEL; R3; C	MEL; R4; C	MEL; R5; C	MEL; R6; C	SMP1; R7; 17	SMP1; R8; 11	SMP1; R9; 12	SMP2; R10; 12	SMP2; R11; 21	SMP2; R12; 5	HID1; R13; 3	HID1; R14; 16	HID1; R15; 22	HID2; R16; 13	HID2; R17; 3	HID2; R18; 3	TOW1; R19; 9	TOW1; R20; 9	TOW1; R21; 6	TOW2; R22; 9	TOW2; R23; 6	TOW2; R24; 5	BEN1; R25; 7	BEN1; R26; 13	BEN1; R27; 6	BEN2; R28; 12	BEN2; R29; 19	BEN2; R30; 12	BAT; R31; 6										9th	1586
2021	Scott Pye	Holden	20	BAT; R1; 19	BAT; R2; 8	SAN; R3; 12	SAN; R4; 8	SAN; R5; 22	SYM; R6; 8	SYM; R7; 9	SYM; R8; 14	BEN; R9; 13	BEN; R10; 10	BEN; R11; 9	HID; R12; 21	HID; R13; 13	HID; R14; 16	TOW; R15; 23	TOW; R16; 21	TOW2; R17; 7	TOW2; R18; 6	TOW2; R19; 18	SYD1; R20; 19	SYD1; R21; 15	SYD1; R22; 20	SYD2; R23; 9	SYD2; R24; 5	SYD2; R25; 18	SYD3; R26; 6	SYD3; R27; 12	SYD3; R28; 6	SYD4; R29; 6	SYD4; R30; C	BAT; R31; Ret										15th	1489
2022	Scott Pye	Holden	20	SMP; R1; Ret	SMP; R2; 15	SYM; R3; 7	SYM; R4; 7	SYM; R5; 13	MEL; R6; 11	MEL; R7; 4	MEL; R8; 25	MEL; R9; 11	BAR; R10; 19	BAR; R11; Ret	BAR; R12; DNS	WIN; R13; 6	WIN; R14; 27	WIN; R15; 14	HID; R16; 6	HID; R17; Ret	HID; R18; DNS	TOW; R19; 5	TOW; R20; Ret	BEN; R21; 12	BEN; R22; 20	BEN; R23; 13	SAN; R24; 7	SAN; R25; 5	SAN; R26; 7	PUK; R27; 10	PUK; R28; 5	PUK; R29; 7	BAT; R30; 16	SUR; R31; 17	SUR; R32; 22	ADE; R33; Ret	ADE; R34; 14							16th	1512
2023	Scott Pye	Chevrolet	20	NEW; R1; 7	NEW; R2; 17	MEL; R3; 15	MEL; R4; 18	MEL; R5; 20	MEL; R6; 13	BAR; R7; 20	BAR; R8; 17	BAR; R9; 10	SYM; R10; 5	SYM; R11; 20	SYM; R12; 15	HID; R13; 12	HID; R14; 9	HID; R15; 23	TOW; R16; 6	TOW; R17; 11	SMP; R18; 10	SMP; R19; 11	BEN; R20; 22	BEN; R2`1; 15	BEN; R22; 11	SAN; R23; 21	BAT; R24; 17	SUR; R25; 6	SUR; R26; Ret	ADE; R27; 10	ADE; R28; 13													18th	1524
2024	David Reynolds	Chevrolet	20	BAT1; R1; 8	BAT1; R2; 6	MEL; R3; 16	MEL; R4; 11	MEL; R5; 4	MEL; R6; 9	TAU; R7; 16	TAU; R8; 24	WAN; R9; 17	WAN; R10; 10	HID; R11; 6	HID; R12; 12	TOW; R13; 15	TOW; R14; 22	SMP; R15; 17	SMP; R16; 17	SYM; R17; 9	SYM; R18; 22	SAN; R19; 8	BAT2; R20; 24	SUR; R21; 6	SUR; R22; 10	ADE; R23; 23	ADE; R24; 11																	13th	1615
2025	David Reynolds	Chevrolet	20	SMP; R1; 15	SMP; R2; 22	SMP; R3; 22	MEL; R4; 17	MEL; R5; 23	MEL; R6; 17	MEL; R7; C	TAU; R8; 11	TAU; R9; 17	TAU; R10; 17	SYM; R11; 19	SYM; R12; 9	SYM; R13; 6	WAN; R14; 16	WAN; R15; 19	WAN; R16; 7	HID; R17; 19	HID; R18; Ret	HID; R19; 15	TOW; R20; 20	TOW; R21; 10	TOW; R22; 21	QLD; R23; 24	QLD; R24; 9	QLD; R25; 11	BEN; R26	BAT; R27	SUR; R28	SUR; R29	SAN; R30	SAN; R31	ADE; R32	ADE; R33	ADE; R34								
