= 2016 Sydney 500 =

Motor racing event

(New South Wales) 2016 Coates Hire Sydney 500
Event Information
- Round 14 of 14 in the 2016 International V8 Supercars Championship
- Date: 2–4 December 2016
- Location: Sydney, New South Wales
- Venue: Homebush Street Circuit
- Weather: Fine

Results
Race 1
Distance	74 laps	250 km
Pole position	Shane van Gisbergen; Triple Eight Race Engineering	1:26.6272
Winner	Jamie Whincup; Triple Eight Race Engineering	1:55:51.3312
Race 2
Distance	73 laps	247 km
Pole position	Garth Tander; Holden Racing Team	1:27.1524
Winner	Shane van Gisbergen; Triple Eight Race Engineering	1:59:59.1234

The 2016 Coates Hire Sydney 500 was a motor racing event for the Supercars Championship held on the weekend of 2 to 4 December 2016. The event was held at the Homebush Street Circuit in Sydney Olympic Park, New South Wales, and consisted of two races of 250 kilometres in length. It was the final round of the 2016 International V8 Supercars Championship, and the final time that the venue hosted a Supercar race, being replaced by the Newcastle Street Circuit from 2017 onwards.

== Report ==
=== Practice ===
Practice summary
Session	Day	Fastest lap				
Session	Day	No.	Driver	Team	Car	Time
Practice 1	Friday	33	(New Zealand) Scott McLaughlin	Garry Rogers Motorsport	Volvo S60	1:27.8095
Practice 2	Friday	97	(New Zealand) Shane van Gisbergen	Triple Eight Race Engineering	Holden VF Commodore	1:27.0734

== Race results ==
=== Race 28 ===
==== Qualifying ====
Pos.	No.	Name	Team	Car	Time
1	97	(New Zealand) Shane van Gisbergen	Triple Eight Race Engineering	Holden VF Commodore	1:26.6272
2	88	(Australia) Jamie Whincup	Triple Eight Race Engineering	Holden VF Commodore	1:26.7306
3	33	(New Zealand) Scott McLaughlin	Garry Rogers Motorsport	Volvo S60	1:26.8455
4	888	(Australia) Craig Lowndes	Triple Eight Race Engineering	Holden VF Commodore	1:27.0335
5	2	(Australia) Garth Tander	Holden Racing Team	Holden VF Commodore	1:27.0532
6	22	(Australia) James Courtney	Holden Racing Team	Holden VF Commodore	1:27.1503
7	9	(Australia) David Reynolds	Erebus Motorsport	Holden VF Commodore	1:27.1888^{1}
8	1	(Australia) Mark Winterbottom	Prodrive Racing Australia	Ford FG X Falcon	1:27.2013
9	55	(Australia) Chaz Mostert	Rod Nash Racing	Ford FG X Falcon	1:27.2600
10	15	(Australia) Rick Kelly	Nissan Motorsport	Nissan Altima L33	1:27.2744
11	6	(Australia) Cam Waters	Prodrive Racing Australia	Ford FG X Falcon	1:27.4261
12	12	(New Zealand) Fabian Coulthard	DJR Team Penske	Ford FG X Falcon	1:27.4485
13	19	(Australia) Will Davison	Tekno Autosports	Holden VF Commodore	1:27.5254
14	222	(Australia) Nick Percat	Lucas Dumbrell Motorsport	Holden VF Commodore	1:27.5639
15	34	(Australia) James Moffat	Garry Rogers Motorsport	Volvo S60	1:27.5771
16	23	(Australia) Michael Caruso	Nissan Motorsport	Nissan Altima L33	1:27.5785
17	14	(Australia) Tim Slade	Brad Jones Racing	Holden VF Commodore	1:27.6221
18	8	(Australia) Jason Bright	Brad Jones Racing	Holden VF Commodore	1:27.6815
19	17	(Australia) Scott Pye	DJR Team Penske	Ford FG X Falcon	1:27.6988
20	7	(Australia) Todd Kelly	Nissan Motorsport	Nissan Altima L33	1:27.7208
21	111	(New Zealand) Chris Pither	Super Black Racing	Ford FG X Falcon	1:27.9182
22	96	(Australia) Dale Wood	Nissan Motorsport	Nissan Altima L33	1:28.3054
23	18	(Australia) Lee Holdsworth	Team 18	Holden VF Commodore	1:28.3317
24	3	(New Zealand) Andre Heimgartner	Lucas Dumbrell Motorsport	Holden VF Commodore	1:28.3659
25	21	(Australia) Tim Blanchard	Britek Motorsport	Holden VF Commodore	1:28.4541
26	4	(Australia) Shae Davies	Erebus Motorsport	Holden VF Commodore	1:28.7687

Notes:

- ^1 — David Reynolds' team exceeded parc fermé regulations after qualifying, which resulted in the exclusion of Reynolds.

==== Race ====
Pos.	No.	Name	Team	Laps	Time	Grid
1	88	(Australia) Jamie Whincup	Triple Eight Race Engineering	74	1:55:51.3313	2
2	2	(Australia) Garth Tander	Holden Racing Team	74	+ 6.84 s	5
3	97	(New Zealand) Shane van Gisbergen	Triple Eight Race Engineering	74	+ 9.83 s	1
4	33	(New Zealand) Scott McLaughlin	Garry Rogers Motorsport	74	+ 10.39 s	3
5	22	(Australia) James Courtney	Holden Racing Team	74	+ 10.84 s	6
6	15	(Australia) Rick Kelly	Nissan Motorsport	74	+ 17.37 s	9
7	19	(Australia) Will Davison	Tekno Autosports	74	+ 17.96 s	12
8	888	(Australia) Craig Lowndes	Triple Eight Race Engineering	74	+ 23.32 s	4
9	14	(Australia) Tim Slade	Brad Jones Racing	74	+ 25.03 s	16
10	9	(Australia) David Reynolds	Erebus Motorsport	74	+ 26.60 s	26
11	12	(New Zealand) Fabian Coulthard	DJR Team Penske	74	+ 27.89 s	11
12	7	(Australia) Todd Kelly	Nissan Motorsport	74	+ 31.59 s	19
13	23	(Australia) Michael Caruso	Nissan Motorsport	74	+ 32.79 s	15
14	17	(Australia) Scott Pye	DJR Team Penske	74	+ 33.90 s	18
15	222	(Australia) Nick Percat	Lucas Dumbrell Motorsport	74	+ 34.66 s	13
16	18	(Australia) Lee Holdsworth	Team 18	74	+ 36.13 s	22
17	55	(Australia) Chaz Mostert	Rod Nash Racing	74	+ 37.02 s	8
18	8	(Australia) Jason Bright	Brad Jones Racing	74	+ 38.04 s	17
19	21	(Australia) Tim Blanchard	Britek Motorsport	74	+ 39.46 s	24
20	3	(New Zealand) Andre Heimgartner	Lucas Dumbrell Motorsport	74	+ 40.25 s	23
21	6	(Australia) Cam Waters	Prodrive Racing Australia	74	+ 46.20 s	10
22	4	(Australia) Shae Davies	Erebus Motorsport	71	+ 3 laps	25
23	1	(Australia) Mark Winterbottom	Prodrive Racing Australia	69	+ 5 laps	7
24	34	(Australia) James Moffat	Garry Rogers Motorsport	65	+ 9 laps	14
Ret	96	(Australia) Dale Wood	Nissan Motorsport	48	Broken steering	21
Ret	111	(New Zealand) Chris Pither	Super Black Racing	1	Accident damage	20
Fastest lap: Shane van Gisbergen (Triple Eight Race Engineering), 1:27.9481

=== Race 29 ===
==== Qualifying ====
Pos.	No.	Name	Team	Car	Time
1	97	(New Zealand) Shane van Gisbergen	Triple Eight Race Engineering	Holden VF Commodore	1:26.9518
2	9	(Australia) David Reynolds	Erebus Motorsport	Holden VF Commodore	1:26.9828
3	88	(Australia) Jamie Whincup	Triple Eight Race Engineering	Holden VF Commodore	1:27.0942
4	22	(Australia) James Courtney	Holden Racing Team	Holden VF Commodore	1:27.1828
5	33	(New Zealand) Scott McLaughlin	Garry Rogers Motorsport	Volvo S60	1:27.2151
6	23	(Australia) Michael Caruso	Nissan Motorsport	Nissan Altima L33	1:27.2360
7	14	(Australia) Tim Slade	Brad Jones Racing	Holden VF Commodore	1:27.2543
8	2	(Australia) Garth Tander	Holden Racing Team	Holden VF Commodore	1:27.2556
9	222	(Australia) Nick Percat	Lucas Dumbrell Motorsport	Holden VF Commodore	1:27.3101
10	7	(Australia) Todd Kelly	Nissan Motorsport	Nissan Altima L33	1:27.3417
11	19	(Australia) Will Davison	Tekno Autosports	Holden VF Commodore	1:27.3438
12	15	(Australia) Rick Kelly	Nissan Motorsport	Nissan Altima L33	1:27.4184
13	1	(Australia) Mark Winterbottom	Prodrive Racing Australia	Ford FG X Falcon	1:27.4194
14	888	(Australia) Craig Lowndes	Triple Eight Race Engineering	Holden VF Commodore	1:27.5594
15	6	(Australia) Cam Waters	Prodrive Racing Australia	Ford FG X Falcon	1:27.5757
16	8	(Australia) Jason Bright	Brad Jones Racing	Holden VF Commodore	1:27.5860
17	34	(Australia) James Moffat	Garry Rogers Motorsport	Volvo S60	1:27.6434
18	12	(New Zealand) Fabian Coulthard	DJR Team Penske	Ford FG X Falcon	1:27.6510
19	55	(Australia) Chaz Mostert	Rod Nash Racing	Ford FG X Falcon	1:27.6717
20	17	(Australia) Scott Pye	DJR Team Penske	Ford FG X Falcon	1:27.8966
21	21	(Australia) Tim Blanchard	Britek Motorsport	Holden VF Commodore	1:27.9611
22	18	(Australia) Lee Holdsworth	Team 18	Holden VF Commodore	1:28.0768
23	96	(Australia) Dale Wood	Nissan Motorsport	Nissan Altima L33	1:28.1640
24	4	(Australia) Shae Davies	Erebus Motorsport	Holden VF Commodore	1:28.2656
25	3	(New Zealand) Andre Heimgartner	Lucas Dumbrell Motorsport	Holden VF Commodore	1:28.3237
26	111	(New Zealand) Chris Pither	Super Black Racing	Ford FG X Falcon	1:28.3633

==== Top Ten Shootout ====
Pos.	No.	Driver	Team	Car	Time
1	2	(Australia) Garth Tander	Holden Racing Team	Holden VF Commodore	1:27.1524
2	97	(New Zealand) Shane van Gisbergen	Triple Eight Race Engineering	Holden VF Commodore	1:27.1660
3	22	(Australia) James Courtney	Holden Racing Team	Holden VF Commodore	1:27.2831
4	9	(Australia) David Reynolds	Erebus Motorsport	Holden VF Commodore	1:27.3672
5	14	(Australia) Tim Slade	Brad Jones Racing	Holden VF Commodore	1:27.4455
6	33	(New Zealand) Scott McLaughlin	Garry Rogers Motorsport	Volvo S60	1:27.4955
7	23	(Australia) Michael Caruso	Nissan Motorsport	Nissan Altima L33	1:27.7445
8	222	(Australia) Nick Percat	Lucas Dumbrell Motorsport	Holden VF Commodore	1:28.2551
9	7	(Australia) Todd Kelly	Nissan Motorsport	Nissan Altima L33	1:28.4348
10	88	(Australia) Jamie Whincup	Triple Eight Race Engineering	Holden VF Commodore	1:31.5703

==== Race ====
Pos.	No.	Name	Team	Laps	Time	Grid
1	97	(New Zealand) Shane van Gisbergen	Triple Eight Race Engineering	73	1:59:59.1235	2
2	2	(Australia) Garth Tander	Holden Racing Team	73	+ 1.03 s	1
3	9	(Australia) David Reynolds	Erebus Motorsport	73	+ 2.39 s	4
4	88	(Australia) Jamie Whincup	Triple Eight Race Engineering	73	+ 2.80 s	10
5	33	(New Zealand) Scott McLaughlin	Garry Rogers Motorsport	73	+ 4.27 s	6
6	22	(Australia) James Courtney	Holden Racing Team	73	+ 4.73 s	3
7	14	(Australia) Tim Slade	Brad Jones Racing	73	+ 6.35 s	5
8	19	(Australia) Will Davison	Tekno Autosports	73	+ 9.44 s	11
9	888	(Australia) Craig Lowndes	Triple Eight Race Engineering	73	+ 9.79 s	14
10	34	(Australia) James Moffat	Garry Rogers Motorsport	73	+ 10.02 s	17
11	55	(Australia) Chaz Mostert	Rod Nash Racing	73	+ 10.44 s	19
12	1	(Australia) Mark Winterbottom	Prodrive Racing Australia	73	+ 10.80 s	13
13	17	(Australia) Scott Pye	DJR Team Penske	73	+ 11.27 s	20
14	23	(Australia) Michael Caruso	Nissan Motorsport	73	+ 12.25 s	7
15	18	(Australia) Lee Holdsworth	Team 18	73	+ 13.27 s	22
16	222	(Australia) Nick Percat	Lucas Dumbrell Motorsport	73	+ 14.86 s	8
17	4	(Australia) Shae Davies	Erebus Motorsport	73	+ 21.81 s	24
18	111	(New Zealand) Chris Pither	Super Black Racing	72	+ 1 lap	26
19	7	(Australia) Todd Kelly	Nissan Motorsport	72	+ 1 lap	9
20	3	(New Zealand) Andre Heimgartner	Lucas Dumbrell Motorsport	71	+ 2 laps	25
21	12	(New Zealand) Fabian Coulthard	DJR Team Penske	60	+ 13 laps	18
Ret	15	(Australia) Rick Kelly	Nissan Motorsport	64	Engine	12
Ret	8	(Australia) Jason Bright	Brad Jones Racing	46	Accident	16
Ret	6	(Australia) Cam Waters	Prodrive Racing Australia	39	Accident	15
Ret	96	(Australia) Dale Wood	Nissan Motorsport	7	Accident damage	23
Ret	21	(Australia) Tim Blanchard	Britek Motorsport	1	Accident damage	21
Fastest lap: James Courtney (Holden Racing Team), 1:28.1700

== Championship standings after the event ==
Drivers' Championship standings

	Pos.	Driver	Points
	1	(New Zealand) Shane van Gisbergen	3368
	2	(Australia) Jamie Whincup	3168
1	3	(New Zealand) Scott McLaughlin	2806
1	4	(Australia) Craig Lowndes	2770
	5	(Australia) Will Davison	2589

Teams' Championship standings

	Pos.	Constructor	Points
	1	Triple Eight Race Engineering	6546
	2	Holden Racing Team	4434
	3	Garry Rogers Motorsport	4250
	4	Prodrive Racing Australia	3962
1	5	DJR Team Penske	3855
