= Adrian Burgess =

British motorsport team manager

Personal information
- Nationality: British
- Born: 18 July 1969 (age 56)

Sport
- Country: Great Britain
- Sport: Formula Three; Formula One (1991-1998) (2005-2006); Supercars (2007-)
- Team: Bowman Racing (1989-1990); McLaren (1991-1998); Carlin Motorsport (1999-2006); Jordan Grand Prix (2005); Midland F1 Racing (2006); Dick Johnson Racing (2007-2010); Triple Eight Race Engineering (2011-2013); Walkinshaw Racing (2014-2017); Tekno Autosports (2018); Team 18 (2024-)

Adrian Burgess (born 18 July 1969) is a motorsport administrator and team manager from Britain.

== Career ==
After working his way through the Formula Three ranks, Burgess became a number one mechanic at Bowman Racing, engineering David Brabham to the 1989 title. In 1991 he joined McLaren working on its Formula One program. In 1999, he returned to Formula Three with Carlin Motorsport. In 2005 he returned to Formula One with Jordan Grand Prix as sporting director.

In 2007 Burgress emigrated to Australia to manage V8 Supercars team Dick Johnson Racing, moving to Triple Eight Race Engineering in 2011, the Holden Racing Team in 2014 and Tekno Autosports in 2018.

In December 2018, Burgess became the Supercars Championship's head of motorsport. In 2024 Burgess will become team principal at Team 18.
