= 2016 Auckland SuperSprint =

Motor racing meeting

(New Zealand) 2016 ITM Auckland SuperSprint
Event Information
- Round 13 of 14 in the 2016 International V8 Supercars Championship
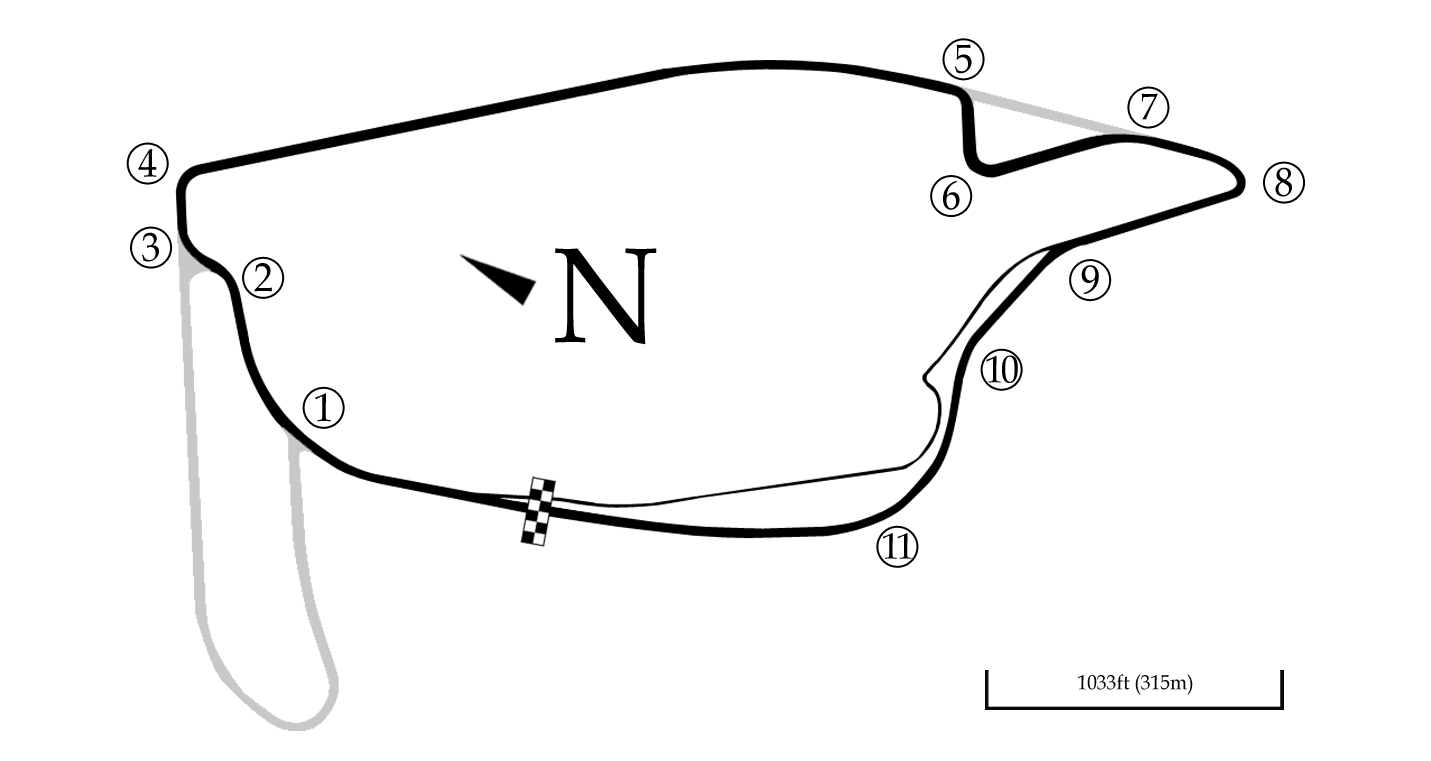
- Date: 4–6 November 2016
- Location: Pukekohe, New Zealand
- Venue: Pukekohe Park Raceway
- Weather: Light Cloud, Overcast

Results
Race 1
Distance	35 laps	100 km
Pole position	Shane van Gisbergen; Triple Eight Race Engineering	1:02.5122
Winner	Jamie Whincup; Triple Eight Race Engineering	45:37.7579
Race 2
Distance	35 laps	100 km
Pole position	Shane van Gisbergen; Triple Eight Race Engineering	1:02.2186
Winner	Shane van Gisbergen; Triple Eight Race Engineering	37:36.1250
Race 3
Distance	35 laps	100 km
Pole position	Shane van Gisbergen; Triple Eight Race Engineering	1:02.9107
Winner	Mark Winterbottom; Prodrive Racing Australia	38:06.2689
Race 4
Distance	35 laps	100 km
Pole position	Jamie Whincup; Triple Eight Race Engineering	1:02.6857
Winner	Jamie Whincup; Triple Eight Race Engineering	37:37.1619

The 2016 ITM Auckland SuperSprint was a motor racing event for Supercars, held on the weekend of 4 to 6 November 2016. The event was held at Pukekohe Park Raceway near Pukekohe, New Zealand, and consisted of four races at 100 kilometres in length. It was the 13th event of fourteen in the 2016 International V8 Supercars Championship and hosted Races 24, 25, 26 and 27 of the season. It was the eleventh running of the Auckland SuperSprint.

== Report ==
=== Practice ===
Practice summary
Session	Day	Fastest lap				
Session	Day	No.	Driver	Team	Car	Time
Practice 1	Friday	9	(Australia) David Reynolds	Erebus Motorsport	Holden VF Commodore	1:02.7397
Practice 2	Friday	97	(New Zealand) Shane van Gisbergen	Triple Eight Race Engineering	Holden VF Commodore	1:02.4611
Practice 3	Friday	88	(Australia) Jamie Whincup	Triple Eight Race Engineering	Holden VF Commodore	1:02.1183

== Race results ==
=== Race 24 ===
==== Qualifying ====
Pos.	No.	Name	Team	Car	Time
1	97	(New Zealand) Shane van Gisbergen	Triple Eight Race Engineering	Holden Commodore (VF)	1:02.5122
2	88	(Australia) Jamie Whincup	Triple Eight Race Engineering	Holden Commodore (VF)	1:02.5177
3	33	(New Zealand) Scott McLaughlin	Garry Rogers Motorsport	Volvo S60	1:02.5220
4	1	(Australia) Mark Winterbottom	Prodrive Racing Australia	Ford Falcon (FG X)	1:02.5505
5	2	(Australia) Garth Tander	Holden Racing Team	Holden Commodore (VF)	1:02.5905
6	22	(Australia) James Courtney	Holden Racing Team	Holden Commodore (VF)	1:02.6046
7	15	(Australia) Rick Kelly	Nissan Motorsport	Nissan Altima (L33)	1:02.6628
8	17	(Australia) Scott Pye	DJR Team Penske	Ford Falcon (FG X)	1:02.7435
9	23	(Australia) Michael Caruso	Nissan Motorsport	Nissan Altima (L33)	1:02.7562
10	55	(Australia) Chaz Mostert	Rod Nash Racing	Ford Falcon (FG X)	1:02.7656
11	6	(Australia) Cam Waters	Prodrive Racing Australia	Ford Falcon (FG X)	1:02.7703
12	19	(Australia) Will Davison	Tekno Autosports	Holden Commodore (VF)	1:02.7785
13	9	(Australia) David Reynolds	Erebus Motorsport	Holden Commodore (VF)	1:02.7794
14	12	(New Zealand) Fabian Coulthard	DJR Team Penske	Ford Falcon (FG X)	1:02.8309
15	222	(Australia) Nick Percat	Lucas Dumbrell Motorsport	Holden Commodore (VF)	1:02.8696
16	18	(Australia) Lee Holdsworth	Team 18	Holden Commodore (VF)	1:02.9140
17	7	(Australia) Todd Kelly	Nissan Motorsport	Nissan Altima (L33)	1:02.9481
18	96	(Australia) Dale Wood	Nissan Motorsport	Nissan Altima (L33)	1:03.0007
19	14	(Australia) Tim Slade	Brad Jones Racing	Holden Commodore (VF)	1:03.0598
20	8	(Australia) Jason Bright	Brad Jones Racing	Holden Commodore (VF)	1:03.0724
21	888	(Australia) Craig Lowndes	Triple Eight Race Engineering	Holden Commodore (VF)	1:03.0767
22	21	(Australia) Tim Blanchard	Britek Motorsport	Holden Commodore (VF)	1:03.1711
23	3	(New Zealand) Andre Heimgartner	Lucas Dumbrell Motorsport	Holden Commodore (VF)	1:03.1992
24	111	(New Zealand) Chris Pither	Super Black Racing	Ford Falcon (FG X)	1:03.3799
25	34	(Australia) James Moffat	Garry Rogers Motorsport	Volvo S60	1:03.5636
26	4	(Australia) Shae Davies	Erebus Motorsport	Holden Commodore (VF)	1:04.0919

==== Race ====
Pos.	No.	Name	Team	Laps	Time	Grid
1	88	(Australia) Jamie Whincup	Triple Eight Race Engineering	35	45min 37.7579sec	2
2	97	(New Zealand) Shane van Gisbergen	Triple Eight Race Engineering	35	+ 6.505	1
3	33	(New Zealand) Scott McLaughlin	Garry Rogers Motorsport	35	+ 8.025	3
4	1	(Australia) Mark Winterbottom	Prodrive Racing Australia	35	+ 10.200	4
5	2	(Australia) Garth Tander	Holden Racing Team	35	+ 10.938	5
6	22	(Australia) James Courtney	Holden Racing Team	35	+ 13.676	6
7	15	(Australia) Rick Kelly	Nissan Motorsport	35	+ 17.374	7
8	23	(Australia) Michael Caruso	Nissan Motorsport	35	+ 21.188	9
9	17	(Australia) Scott Pye	DJR Team Penske	35	+ 22.027	8
10	19	(Australia) Will Davison	Tekno Autosports	35	+ 22.665	12
11	12	(New Zealand) Fabian Coulthard	DJR Team Penske	35	+ 24.889	14
12	6	(Australia) Cam Waters	Prodrive Racing Australia	35	+ 26.009	11
13	9	(Australia) David Reynolds	Erebus Motorsport	35	+ 27.279	13
14	222	(Australia) Nick Percat	Lucas Dumbrell Motorsport	35	+ 27.745	15
15	18	(Australia) Lee Holdsworth	Team 18	35	+ 28.796	16
16	888	(Australia) Craig Lowndes	Triple Eight Race Engineering	35	+ 29.211	21
17	14	(Australia) Tim Slade	Brad Jones Racing	35	+ 32.066	19
18	21	(Australia) Tim Blanchard	Britek Motorsport	35	+ 32.612	22
19	7	(Australia) Todd Kelly	Nissan Motorsport	35	+ 41.340	17
20	34	(Australia) James Moffat	Garry Rogers Motorsport	35	+ 42.326	25
21	55	(Australia) Chaz Mostert	Rod Nash Racing	35	+ 42.701	10
22	3	(New Zealand) Andre Heimgartner	Lucas Dumbrell Motorsport	35	+ 46.199	23
23	4	(Australia) Shae Davies	Erebus Motorsport	34	+ 1 lap	26
24	111	(New Zealand) Chris Pither	Super Black Racing	34	+ 1 lap	24
Ret	96	(Australia) Dale Wood	Nissan Motorsport	21	Accident damage	18
Ret	8	(Australia) Jason Bright	Brad Jones Racing	0	Accident	20
Fastest lap: Jamie Whincup (Triple Eight Race Engineering), 1:03.5126

=== Race 25 ===
==== Qualifying ====
Pos.	No.	Name	Team	Car	Time
1	97	(New Zealand) Shane van Gisbergen	Triple Eight Race Engineering	Holden Commodore (VF)	1:02.2186
2	88	(Australia) Jamie Whincup	Triple Eight Race Engineering	Holden Commodore (VF)	1:02.2667
3	55	(Australia) Chaz Mostert	Rod Nash Racing	Ford Falcon (FG X)	1:02.2932
4	12	(New Zealand) Fabian Coulthard	DJR Team Penske	Ford Falcon (FG X)	1:02.3621
5	19	(Australia) Will Davison	Tekno Autosports	Holden Commodore (VF)	1:02.4507
6	1	(Australia) Mark Winterbottom	Prodrive Racing Australia	Ford Falcon (FG X)	1:02.4980
7	23	(Australia) Michael Caruso	Nissan Motorsport	Nissan Altima (L33)	1:02.5005
8	33	(New Zealand) Scott McLaughlin	Garry Rogers Motorsport	Volvo S60	1:02.5298
9	17	(Australia) Scott Pye	DJR Team Penske	Ford Falcon (FG X)	1:02.5334
10	9	(Australia) David Reynolds	Erebus Motorsport	Holden Commodore (VF)	1:02.6140
11	6	(Australia) Cam Waters	Prodrive Racing Australia	Ford Falcon (FG X)	1:02.6524
12	7	(Australia) Todd Kelly	Nissan Motorsport	Nissan Altima (L33)	1:02.6685
13	888	(Australia) Craig Lowndes	Triple Eight Race Engineering	Holden Commodore (VF)	1:02.6856
14	15	(Australia) Rick Kelly	Nissan Motorsport	Nissan Altima (L33)	1:02.7052
15	2	(Australia) Garth Tander	Holden Racing Team	Holden Commodore (VF)	1:02.7103
16	22	(Australia) James Courtney	Holden Racing Team	Holden Commodore (VF)	1:02.7586
17	8	(Australia) Jason Bright	Brad Jones Racing	Holden Commodore (VF)	1:02.7794
18	96	(Australia) Dale Wood	Nissan Motorsport	Nissan Altima (L33)	1:02.8576
19	21	(Australia) Tim Blanchard	Britek Motorsport	Holden Commodore (VF)	1:02.9141
20	222	(Australia) Nick Percat	Lucas Dumbrell Motorsport	Holden Commodore (VF)	1:02.9168
21	18	(Australia) Lee Holdsworth	Team 18	Holden Commodore (VF)	1:02.9706
22	34	(Australia) James Moffat	Garry Rogers Motorsport	Volvo S60	1:03.0272
23	3	(New Zealand) Andre Heimgartner	Lucas Dumbrell Motorsport	Holden Commodore (VF)	1:03.1755
24	111	(New Zealand) Chris Pither	Super Black Racing	Ford Falcon (FG X)	1:03.1996
25	4	(Australia) Shae Davies	Erebus Motorsport	Holden Commodore (VF)	1:03.3769
–	14	(Australia) Tim Slade	Brad Jones Racing	Holden Commodore (VF)	no time

==== Race ====
Pos.	No.	Name	Team	Laps	Time	Grid
1	97	(New Zealand) Shane van Gisbergen	Triple Eight Race Engineering	35	37hrs 36.1250sec	1
2	88	(Australia) Jamie Whincup	Triple Eight Race Engineering	35	+ 2.181	2
3	55	(Australia) Chaz Mostert	Rod Nash Racing	35	+ 9.287	3
4	12	(New Zealand) Fabian Coulthard	DJR Team Penske	35	+ 12.347	4
5	1	(Australia) Mark Winterbottom	Prodrive Racing Australia	35	+ 13.863	6
6	19	(Australia) Will Davison	Tekno Autosports	35	+ 18.119	5
7	33	(New Zealand) Scott McLaughlin	Garry Rogers Motorsport	35	+ 19.872	8
8	9	(Australia) David Reynolds	Erebus Motorsport	35	+ 25.625	10
9	23	(Australia) Michael Caruso	Nissan Motorsport	35	+ 26.648	7
10	2	(Australia) Garth Tander	Holden Racing Team	35	+ 27.816	15
11	17	(Australia) Scott Pye	DJR Team Penske	35	+ 30.012	9
12	15	(Australia) Rick Kelly	Nissan Motorsport	35	+ 30.332	14
13	22	(Australia) James Courtney	Holden Racing Team	35	+ 30.698	16
14	34	(Australia) James Moffat	Garry Rogers Motorsport	35	+ 31.926	22
15	888	(Australia) Craig Lowndes	Triple Eight Race Engineering	35	+ 32.916	13
16	7	(Australia) Todd Kelly	Nissan Motorsport	35	+ 34.528	12
17	6	(Australia) Cam Waters	Prodrive Racing Australia	35	+ 38.593	11
18	222	(Australia) Nick Percat	Lucas Dumbrell Motorsport	35	+ 39.169	20
19	18	(Australia) Lee Holdsworth	Team 18	35	+ 39.370	21
20	21	(Australia) Tim Blanchard	Britek Motorsport	35	+ 39.816	19
21	96	(Australia) Dale Wood	Nissan Motorsport	35	+ 41.608	18
22	3	(New Zealand) Andre Heimgartner	Lucas Dumbrell Motorsport	35	+ 42.029	23
23	14	(Australia) Tim Slade	Brad Jones Racing	35	+ 43.952	26
24	111	(New Zealand) Chris Pither	Super Black Racing	35	+ 48.044	24
25	4	(Australia) Shae Davies	Erebus Motorsport	35	+ 53.938	25
DNS	8	(Australia) Jason Bright	Brad Jones Racing	–	Did Not Start	–
Fastest lap: Shane van Gisbergen (Triple Eight Race Engineering), 1:03.7365

=== Race 26 ===
==== Qualifying ====
Pos.	No.	Name	Team	Car	Time
1	97	(New Zealand) Shane van Gisbergen	Triple Eight Race Engineering	Holden Commodore (VF)	1:02.9107
2	17	(Australia) Scott Pye	DJR Team Penske	Ford Falcon (FG X)	1:02.9183
3	12	(New Zealand) Fabian Coulthard	DJR Team Penske	Ford Falcon (FG X)	1:03.0719
4	1	(Australia) Mark Winterbottom	Prodrive Racing Australia	Ford Falcon (FG X)	1:03.0844
5	88	(Australia) Jamie Whincup	Triple Eight Race Engineering	Holden Commodore (VF)	1:03.0939
6	55	(Australia) Chaz Mostert	Rod Nash Racing	Ford Falcon (FG X)	1:03.0949
7	888	(Australia) Craig Lowndes	Triple Eight Race Engineering	Holden Commodore (VF)	1:03.1810
8	33	(New Zealand) Scott McLaughlin	Garry Rogers Motorsport	Volvo S60	1:03.1902
9	19	(Australia) Will Davison	Tekno Autosports	Holden Commodore (VF)	1:03.2076
10	23	(Australia) Michael Caruso	Nissan Motorsport	Nissan Altima (L33)	1:03.2269
11	15	(Australia) Rick Kelly	Nissan Motorsport	Nissan Altima (L33)	1:03.2937
12	22	(Australia) James Courtney	Holden Racing Team	Holden Commodore (VF)	1:03.3022
13	2	(Australia) Garth Tander	Holden Racing Team	Holden Commodore (VF)	1:03.3251
14	8	(Australia) Jason Bright	Brad Jones Racing	Holden Commodore (VF)	1:03.3346
15	34	(Australia) James Moffat	Garry Rogers Motorsport	Volvo S60	1:03.3410
16	7	(Australia) Todd Kelly	Nissan Motorsport	Nissan Altima (L33)	1:03.3906
17	18	(Australia) Lee Holdsworth	Team 18	Holden Commodore (VF)	1:03.4701
18	222	(Australia) Nick Percat	Lucas Dumbrell Motorsport	Holden Commodore (VF)	1:03.5124
19	9	(Australia) David Reynolds	Erebus Motorsport	Holden Commodore (VF)	1:03.5250
20	14	(Australia) Tim Slade	Brad Jones Racing	Holden Commodore (VF)	1:03.5551
21	6	(Australia) Cam Waters	Prodrive Racing Australia	Ford Falcon (FG X)	1:03.6041
22	111	(New Zealand) Chris Pither	Super Black Racing	Ford Falcon (FG X)	1:03.6542
23	21	(Australia) Tim Blanchard	Britek Motorsport	Holden Commodore (VF)	1:03.6590
24	96	(Australia) Dale Wood	Nissan Motorsport	Nissan Altima (L33)	1:03.7229
25	4	(Australia) Shae Davies	Erebus Motorsport	Holden Commodore (VF)	1:03.8587
26	3	(New Zealand) Andre Heimgartner	Lucas Dumbrell Motorsport	Holden Commodore (VF)	1:03.9536

==== Race ====
Pos.	No.	Name	Team	Laps	Time	Grid
1	1	(Australia) Mark Winterbottom	Prodrive Racing Australia	35	38mins 06.2689sec	4
2	17	(Australia) Scott Pye	DJR Team Penske	35	+ 10.150	2
3	97	(New Zealand) Shane van Gisbergen	Triple Eight Race Engineering	35	+ 12.993	1
4	888	(Australia) Craig Lowndes	Triple Eight Race Engineering	35	+ 13.895	7
5	12	(New Zealand) Fabian Coulthard	DJR Team Penske	35	+ 13.863	3
6	55	(Australia) Chaz Mostert	Rod Nash Racing	35	+ 18.119	6
7	33	(New Zealand) Scott McLaughlin	Garry Rogers Motorsport	35	+ 19.872	8
8	19	(Australia) Will Davison	Tekno Autosports	35	+ 25.625	9
9	15	(Australia) Rick Kelly	Nissan Motorsport	35	+ 20.859	11
10	2	(Australia) Garth Tander	Holden Racing Team	35	+ 21.713	13
11	22	(Australia) James Courtney	Holden Racing Team	35	+ 22.592	12
12	34	(Australia) James Moffat	Garry Rogers Motorsport	35	+ 23.419	15
13	23	(Australia) Michael Caruso	Nissan Motorsport	35	+ 23.832	10
14	18	(Australia) Lee Holdsworth	Team 18	35	+ 24.312	17
15	7	(Australia) Todd Kelly	Nissan Motorsport	35	+ 25.205	16
16	8	(Australia) Jason Bright	Brad Jones Racing	35	+ 29.074	14
17	9	(Australia) David Reynolds	Erebus Motorsport	35	+ 29.779	19
18	222	(Australia) Nick Percat	Lucas Dumbrell Motorsport	35	+ 30.141	18
19	14	(Australia) Tim Slade	Brad Jones Racing	35	+ 30.470	20
20	6	(Australia) Cam Waters	Prodrive Racing Australia	35	+ 34.410	21
21	96	(Australia) Dale Wood	Nissan Motorsport	35	+ 37.885	24
22	3	(New Zealand) Andre Heimgartner	Lucas Dumbrell Motorsport	35	+ 38.719	26
23	111	(New Zealand) Chris Pither	Super Black Racing	35	+ 44.321	22
24	4	(Australia) Shae Davies	Erebus Motorsport	35	+ 54.843	25
25	88	(Australia) Jamie Whincup	Triple Eight Race Engineering	34	+ 1 lap	5
26	21	(Australia) Tim Blanchard	Britek Motorsport	34	+ 1 lap	23
Fastest lap: Jamie Whincup (Triple Eight Race Engineering), 1:04.0351

=== Race 27 ===
==== Qualifying ====
Pos.	No.	Name	Team	Car	Time
1	88	(Australia) Jamie Whincup	Triple Eight Race Engineering	Holden Commodore (VF)	1:02.6857
2	97	(New Zealand) Shane van Gisbergen	Triple Eight Race Engineering	Holden Commodore (VF)	1:02.7018
3	33	(New Zealand) Scott McLaughlin	Garry Rogers Motorsport	Volvo S60	1:02.7232
4	55	(Australia) Chaz Mostert	Rod Nash Racing	Ford Falcon (FG X)	1:02.8179
5	1	(Australia) Mark Winterbottom	Prodrive Racing Australia	Ford Falcon (FG X)	1:02.8326
6	12	(New Zealand) Fabian Coulthard	DJR Team Penske	Ford Falcon (FG X)	1:02.9459
7	19	(Australia) Will Davison	Tekno Autosports	Holden Commodore (VF)	1:02.9773
8	17	(Australia) Scott Pye	DJR Team Penske	Ford Falcon (FG X)	1:03.0114
9	888	(Australia) Craig Lowndes	Triple Eight Race Engineering	Holden Commodore (VF)	1:03.0121
10	34	(Australia) James Moffat	Garry Rogers Motorsport	Volvo S60	1:03.0675
11	23	(Australia) Michael Caruso	Nissan Motorsport	Nissan Altima (L33)	1:03.0944
12	2	(Australia) Garth Tander	Holden Racing Team	Holden Commodore (VF)	1:03.1412
13	7	(Australia) Todd Kelly	Nissan Motorsport	Nissan Altima (L33)	1:03.1755
14	18	(Australia) Lee Holdsworth	Team 18	Holden Commodore (VF)	1:03.1830
15	22	(Australia) James Courtney	Holden Racing Team	Holden Commodore (VF)	1:03.2385
16	15	(Australia) Rick Kelly	Nissan Motorsport	Nissan Altima (L33)	1:03.2541
17	6	(Australia) Cam Waters	Prodrive Racing Australia	Ford Falcon (FG X)	1:03.3025
18	9	(Australia) David Reynolds	Erebus Motorsport	Holden Commodore (VF)	1:03.3202
19	8	(Australia) Jason Bright	Brad Jones Racing	Holden Commodore (VF)	1:03.3299
20	4	(Australia) Shae Davies	Erebus Motorsport	Holden Commodore (VF)	1:03.3499
21	96	(Australia) Dale Wood	Nissan Motorsport	Nissan Altima (L33)	1:03.3669
22	111	(New Zealand) Chris Pither	Super Black Racing	Ford Falcon (FG X)	1:03.4009
23	222	(Australia) Nick Percat	Lucas Dumbrell Motorsport	Holden Commodore (VF)	1:03.4337
24	21	(Australia) Tim Blanchard	Britek Motorsport	Holden Commodore (VF)	1:03.4894
25	14	(Australia) Tim Slade	Brad Jones Racing	Holden Commodore (VF)	1:03.5925
26	3	(New Zealand) Andre Heimgartner	Lucas Dumbrell Motorsport	Holden Commodore (VF)	1:03.6049

==== Race ====
Pos.	No.	Name	Team	Laps	Time	Grid
1	88	(Australia) Jamie Whincup	Triple Eight Race Engineering	35	37min 37.1619sec	1
2	97	(New Zealand) Shane van Gisbergen	Triple Eight Race Engineering	35	+ 8.737	2
3	33	(New Zealand) Scott McLaughlin	Garry Rogers Motorsport	35	+ 19.478	3
4	55	(Australia) Chaz Mostert	Rod Nash Racing	35	+ 19.899	4
5	1	(Australia) Mark Winterbottom	Prodrive Racing Australia	35	+ 20.650	5
6	888	(Australia) Craig Lowndes	Triple Eight Race Engineering	35	+ 21.135	9
7	2	(Australia) Garth Tander	Holden Racing Team	35	+ 21.926	12
8	12	(New Zealand) Fabian Coulthard	DJR Team Penske	35	+ 23.569	6
9	17	(Australia) Scott Pye	DJR Team Penske	35	+ 24.403	8
10	34	(Australia) James Moffat	Garry Rogers Motorsport	35	+ 25.359	10
11	7	(Australia) Todd Kelly	Nissan Motorsport	35	+ 25.942	13
12	23	(Australia) Michael Caruso	Nissan Motorsport	35	+ 28.395	11
13	19	(Australia) Will Davison	Tekno Autosports	35	+ 31.076	7
14	22	(Australia) James Courtney	Holden Racing Team	35	+ 31.720	15
15	18	(Australia) Lee Holdsworth	Team 18	35	+ 32.130	14
16	14	(Australia) Tim Slade	Brad Jones Racing	35	+ 35.189	25
17	6	(Australia) Cam Waters	Prodrive Racing Australia	35	+ 37.273	17
18	96	(Australia) Dale Wood	Nissan Motorsport	35	+ 37.805	21
19	8	(Australia) Jason Bright	Brad Jones Racing	35	+ 45.180	19
20	21	(Australia) Tim Blanchard	Britek Motorsport	35	+ 45.873	24
21	222	(Australia) Nick Percat	Lucas Dumbrell Motorsport	35	+ 46.319	23
22	111	(New Zealand) Chris Pither	Super Black Racing	35	+ 56.140	22
23	4	(Australia) Shae Davies	Erebus Motorsport	34	+ 1 lap	20
24	15	(Australia) Rick Kelly	Nissan Motorsport	34	+ 1 lap	16
25	9	(Australia) David Reynolds	Erebus Motorsport	33	+ 2 laps	18
Ret	3	(New Zealand) Andre Heimgartner	Lucas Dumbrell Motorsport	4	Retired	26
Fastest lap: Jamie Whincup (Triple Eight Race Engineering), 1:03.9394

== Aftermath ==
=== Championship standings ===
Drivers' Championship standings

Pos.	Driver	Points
1	(New Zealand) Shane van Gisbergen	3089
2	(Australia) Jamie Whincup	2898
3	(Australia) Craig Lowndes	2596
4	(New Zealand) Scott McLaughlin	2575
5	(Australia) Will Davison	2403

Teams' Championship standings

	Pos.	Constructor	Points
	1	Triple Eight Race Engineering	5997
	2	Holden Racing Team	3945
	3	Garry Rogers Motorsport	3908
	4	Prodrive Racing Australia	3815
1	5	DJR Team Penske	3612
