= 2016 Darwin Triple Crown =

2016 V8 Supercar championship race

(Northern Territory) 2016 CrownBet Darwin Triple Crown
Event Information
- Round 6 of 14 in the 2016 International V8 Supercars Championship
- Date: 17–19 June 2016
- Location: Darwin, Northern Territory
- Venue: Hidden Valley Raceway
- Weather: Friday: fine Saturday: fine Sunday: fine

Results
Race 1
Distance	42 laps	120 km
Pole position	Shane van Gisbergen; Triple Eight Race Engineering	1:06.0923
Winner	Michael Caruso; Nissan Motorsport	50:12.3730
Race 2
Distance	70 laps	200 km
Pole position	Shane van Gisbergen; Triple Eight Race Engineering	1:06.6797
Winner	Shane van Gisbergen; Triple Eight Race Engineering	1:32:52.6896

The 2016 CrownBet Darwin Triple Crown was a motor racing event for V8 Supercars, held on the weekend of 17 to 19 June 2016. The event was held at Hidden Valley Raceway in Darwin, Northern Territory, and consisted of one race of 120 kilometres and one race of 200 km in length. It was the sixth event of fourteen in the 2016 International V8 Supercars Championship and hosted Races 12 and 13 of the season. The event was the 19th running of the Darwin Triple Crown.

The first race of the weekend was won by Michael Caruso, his first victory since 2009 and the first for Nissan Motorsport since 2013. Shane van Gisbergen had started from pole position but incurred a drive-through penalty for illegally overtaking Caruso on a safety car restart. Van Gisbergen recovered to win the second race from pole position. The second race was marred by two major incidents on the first lap, one of which left Lee Holdsworth in hospital with fractures to his pelvis, right knee and two ribs. The other involved James Moffat, Fabian Coulthard and Chaz Mostert and caused major damage to Coulthard's car. Jamie Whincup took the championship lead by finishing second in Race 12, while the leader coming into the event, Mark Winterbottom, dropped to fourth place after finishing 20th in Race 13.

== Report ==
=== Background ===
Various personnel changes took place at a number of teams ahead of the event. Todd Kelly's race engineer Jesse Walker left Nissan Motorsport following the Winton event; he was replaced by the team's engineering manager, Perry Kapper. Campbell Little, who had engineered David Reynolds' car for Erebus Motorsport in the first five events of the season, switched to Lucas Dumbrell Motorsport to work with Andre Heimgartner. His role at Erebus Motorsport was taken by the team's general manager, Barry Ryan. Significant changes were made by the Holden Racing Team, with Garth Tander's race engineer Blake Smith being dismissed while James Courtney's engineer Alistair McVean was moved into another role. They were replaced by Alex Somerset and Rob Starr respectively.

A one-off livery for Craig Lowndes' car was revealed by Triple Eight Race Engineering on the Thursday prior to the event. The livery featured artwork designed by a local Indigenous student, and was done in support of the Clontarf Foundation. Fabian Coulthard's car also featured a different livery, with sponsorship from Australian paint company Taubmans, as part of DJR Team Penske's system of rotational sponsors. Coulthard's teammate Scott Pye took part in a new chassis, as did Mark Winterbottom for Prodrive Racing Australia.

A change was made to the drop gear ratio compared to the previous year's event, where cars were reaching the rev limiter on the main straight. The ratio change was aimed to reduce the amount of time that cars spent on the limiter, lessening the risk of damage to the drivetrain. Overtaking at the first corner was made easier, as the top speed of the cars on the main straight was no longer restricted by the limiter.

During the 2015 event, there was controversy when Reynolds went off the circuit at Turn 5, but maintained the race lead by rejoining at Turn 7. A similar incident involving Jason Bright occurred at Sydney Motorsport Park later in the season. The issue was addressed ahead of the 2016 event, with drivers who short-cut the circuit now required to drop behind the last car on the lead lap.

Winterbottom entered the event as the championship leader, 27 points clear of Scott McLaughlin.

=== Practice ===
The first practice session was run on Friday morning and was one hour in length. Two Enduro Cup co-drivers completed laps during the session: Matt Campbell in Todd Kelly's car and Macauley Jones in Tim Blanchard's car. Rick Kelly set a lap time of 1:07.0515 to be fastest, ahead of Triple Eight Race Engineering teammates Jamie Whincup and Shane van Gisbergen. Numerous drivers went off the circuit during the session, including James Moffat who hit the tyre wall at Turn 10. Coulthard's engine had a misfire, prompting DJR Team Penske to change the engine for the second one-hour practice session, which was held in the afternoon. Coulthard missed the first half of the session while the change was carried out. Despite this, he set the sixth fastest time. The fastest time was set by Whincup, with Rick Kelly second fastest ahead of Van Gisbergen. Aaren Russell hit the wall at Turn 10 halfway through the session, damaging the front of his car. He did not take part in the rest of the session. Ford drivers dominated the final 15-minute practice session, held on Saturday morning. Pye was fastest ahead of Chaz Mostert, Winterbottom and Coulthard.

Practice summary
Session	Day	Fastest lap				
Session	Day	No.	Driver	Team	Car	Time
Practice 1	Friday	15	(Australia) Rick Kelly	Nissan Motorsport	Nissan Altima L33	1:07.0515
Practice 2	Friday	88	(Australia) Jamie Whincup	Triple Eight Race Engineering	Holden VF Commodore	1:06.6209
Practice 3	Saturday	17	(Australia) Scott Pye	DJR Team Penske	Ford FG X Falcon	1:06.2552

=== Qualifying – Race 12 ===
Qualifying for Race 12 was a single 15-minute session held on Saturday morning. The session began with cloud cover over the circuit and Van Gisbergen took advantage of the resulting lower track temperature to set a time of 1:06.0923, which would prove to be fast enough for pole position. Other drivers improved their times later in the session despite the track temperature rising, with Michael Caruso's time of 1:06.1754 being the closest to Van Gisbergen's time. Will Davison qualified third ahead of Mostert and Winterbottom.

=== Race 12 ===
Race 12 took place on Saturday afternoon, with regulations requiring each car to make at least one pit stop to change all four tyres. Caruso made a better start than Van Gisbergen and took the lead going into the first corner. At Turn 5, Tim Slade touched the rear of Rick Kelly's car, causing Kelly to hit and spin Lowndes. Slade was not penalised, with the stewards calling the contact a racing incident. Tander was also involved in contact on the first lap, losing his driver's door, while Nick Percat retired from the race with suspension damage. The safety car was deployed to allow marshals to collect Tander's door. The race was restarted at the end of lap 3 and Van Gisbergen made contact with Caruso at the final corner, allowing him to take the lead on the run to the line. However, as Van Gisbergen passed Caruso before the control line, he was given a drive-through penalty. After the race Van Gisbergen admitted that the move was his mistake. The restart also saw Whincup and Pye make contact, with the latter scraping the wall on the pit straight.

Davison, who had taken advantage of Van Gisbergen's move to also pass Caruso, inherited the lead when Van Gisbergen served his penalty. Caruso made his pit stop on lap 11 and began setting fast lap times, which enabled him to move in front of Davison after the latter had completed his pit stop. DJR Team Penske teammates Pye and Coulthard ran a longer first stint, pitting on laps 19 and 24 respectively. Van Gisbergen was the last driver to make his pit stop, doing so on lap 33. This left Caruso in the lead ahead of Whincup and Mostert, with the top three remaining the same at the finish. It was Caruso's first win since the corresponding event in 2009. Pye and Coulthard utilised their younger tyres to move up to fifth and sixth respectively, behind Davison. With Winterbottom and McLaughlin finishing ninth and tenth, Whincup took the championship lead.

=== Qualifying – Race 13 ===
Qualifying for Race 13 took place on Sunday morning and consisted of a 20-minute session followed by a top ten shootout for the fastest ten qualifiers. Lowndes set a time of 1:06.0259 to be fastest in the qualifying session ahead of Rick Kelly and Mostert. Slade, Caruso, McLaughlin, Van Gisbergen, Winterbottom, Whincup and Todd Kelly completed the top ten and progressed to the top ten shootout.

The top ten shootout saw each of the ten drivers complete one flying lap each, in reverse order of their qualifying positions. Todd Kelly ran first and set a time of 1:06.7320. Whincup made a mistake and ran wide at the final corner, leaving him over one second behind Kelly's time. Winterbottom was also unable to beat Kelly's time, but Van Gisbergen's set a time of 1:06.6797, which would prove to be good enough for pole position. None of the remaining drivers were able to go faster than Winterbottom, leaving Van Gisbergen, Todd Kelly and Winterbottom as the top three. Slade was fourth fastest ahead of Rick Kelly, Lowndes, McLaughlin and Mostert. Caruso ran wide at Turn 1, leaving him ninth fastest ahead of Whincup.

=== Race 13 ===
Race 13 was held on Sunday afternoon and the race regulations required each car to take on at least 120 litres of fuel during the race. Todd Kelly took the lead at the start before the safety car was deployed due to two major crashes in the first half of the lap. On the exit of the first corner, Bright was bumped into Lee Holdsworth who then went off the track and made heavy side-on contact with a concrete barrier. Holdsworth was taken to Royal Darwin Hospital after being extracted from his car. Moffat, Coulthard and Mostert had a separate incident at Turn 4, with the trio attempting to run three-wide before Moffat and Coulthard made contact. Coulthard spun and collected Mostert, who had taken to the grass to try to avoid contact, with both hitting the outside wall. Mostert's car continued on the grass and went across the circuit at Turn 5 while Coulthard's car bounced back onto the track on the exit of Turn 4. Mostert was able to return to the pits for repairs and rejoined the race multiple laps off the lead.

The deployment of the safety car saw all of the other drivers make a pit stop at the end of the first lap, with multiple drivers being forced to park in the pit lane while their teammate's car was serviced first. This hindered some of the drivers and Lowndes emerged as the leader ahead of Todd Kelly, Winterbottom, Van Gisbergen, Slade and Courtney. After the race restarted, Winterbottom ran into the back of Kelly at Turn 1, sending the latter wide and earning himself a drive-through penalty. Pye made contact with Caruso at Turn 6, damaging his suspension which eventually caused him to stop on the pit straight. The safety car was deployed again and a number of drivers down the order took the opportunity to pit and take on more of the minimum fuel requirement. Van Gisbergen took the lead from Lowndes at the restart and led through the second and final round of pit stops for the leaders, which took place around lap 33.

Once all drivers had completed their pit stops, Van Gisbergen led from Slade, Lowndes, Davison and Courtney. Blanchard was running in eleventh place when he suffered a puncture on lap 56, forcing him to make a pit stop. The safety car made another appearance to enable the tyre debris to be cleared. Winterbottom made contact with Russell on lap 63 and received a second drive-through penalty, leaving him in 20th place. Despite the safety car period, Van Gisbergen went on to take victory over Slade and Lowndes, with Davison and Courtney completing the top five. Whincup finished eighth but maintained the championship lead, 30 points clear of Lowndes with McLaughlin in third, a further 15 points behind.

==== Post-race ====
It was revealed after the race that Holdsworth had suffered fractures to his pelvis, right knee and two ribs, as well as minor injuries to his chest and left elbow, with data from his car showing a peak load of 56 g during the crash. Holdsworth was transferred to Freemasons Hospital in Melbourne on 21 June, where it was confirmed that he did not require surgery. Holdsworth said of the crash: "I remember hitting and feeling pain straight away shoot up through my whole body really, mostly the left side of my body ... I came to a stop and I couldn’t breathe and I was screaming and just couldn’t get my breath back."

Winterbottom called the race "one of my worst efforts in a race car", admitting fault for the incident with Todd Kelly but saying he was frustrated with the second penalty, claiming he had been forced wide by Russell at the preceding corner.

== Results ==
=== Race 12 ===
==== Qualifying ====
Pos.	No.	Driver	Team	Car	Time
1	97	(New Zealand) Shane van Gisbergen	Triple Eight Race Engineering	Holden VF Commodore	1:06.0923
2	23	(Australia) Michael Caruso	Nissan Motorsport	Nissan Altima L33	1:06.1754
3	19	(Australia) Will Davison	Tekno Autosports	Holden VF Commodore	1:06.2491
4	55	(Australia) Chaz Mostert	Rod Nash Racing	Ford FG X Falcon	1:06.3224
5	1	(Australia) Mark Winterbottom	Prodrive Racing Australia	Ford FG X Falcon	1:06.3452
6	88	(Australia) Jamie Whincup	Triple Eight Race Engineering	Holden VF Commodore	1:06.3540
7	888	(Australia) Craig Lowndes	Triple Eight Race Engineering	Holden VF Commodore	1:06.3959
8	14	(Australia) Tim Slade	Brad Jones Racing	Holden VF Commodore	1:06.4153
9	17	(Australia) Scott Pye	DJR Team Penske	Ford FG X Falcon	1:06.4243
10	15	(Australia) Rick Kelly	Nissan Motorsport	Nissan Altima L33	1:06.4477
11	12	(New Zealand) Fabian Coulthard	DJR Team Penske	Ford FG X Falcon	1:06.4861
12	18	(Australia) Lee Holdsworth	Team 18	Holden VF Commodore	1:06.4967
13	6	(Australia) Cam Waters	Prodrive Racing Australia	Ford FG X Falcon	1:06.5536
14	7	(Australia) Todd Kelly	Nissan Motorsport	Nissan Altima L33	1:06.5727
15	33	(New Zealand) Scott McLaughlin	Garry Rogers Motorsport	Volvo S60	1:06.5771
16	9	(Australia) David Reynolds	Erebus Motorsport	Holden VF Commodore	1:06.6280
17	22	(Australia) James Courtney	Holden Racing Team	Holden VF Commodore	1:06.7049
18	3	(New Zealand) Andre Heimgartner	Lucas Dumbrell Motorsport	Holden VF Commodore	1:06.7232
19	111	(New Zealand) Chris Pither	Super Black Racing	Ford FG X Falcon	1:06.7654
20	34	(Australia) James Moffat	Garry Rogers Motorsport	Volvo S60	1:06.8445
21	96	(Australia) Dale Wood	Nissan Motorsport	Nissan Altima L33	1:06.8582
22	222	(Australia) Nick Percat	Lucas Dumbrell Motorsport	Holden VF Commodore	1:06.8662
23	21	(Australia) Tim Blanchard	Britek Motorsport	Holden VF Commodore	1:06.9270
24	8	(Australia) Jason Bright	Brad Jones Racing	Holden VF Commodore	1:06.9344
25	2	(Australia) Garth Tander	Holden Racing Team	Holden VF Commodore	1:06.9522
26	4	(Australia) Aaren Russell	Erebus Motorsport	Holden VF Commodore	1:07.2319

==== Race ====
Pos.	No.	Driver	Team	Car	Laps	Time/Retired	Grid	Points
1	23	(Australia) Michael Caruso	Nissan Motorsport	Nissan Altima L33	42	50:12.3730	2	150
2	88	(Australia) Jamie Whincup	Triple Eight Race Engineering	Holden VF Commodore	42	+1.8 s	6	138
3	55	(Australia) Chaz Mostert	Rod Nash Racing	Ford FG X Falcon	42	+5.1 s	4	129
4	19	(Australia) Will Davison	Tekno Autosports	Holden VF Commodore	42	+6.0 s	3	120
5	17	(Australia) Scott Pye	DJR Team Penske	Ford FG X Falcon	42	+7.2 s	9	111
6	12	(New Zealand) Fabian Coulthard	DJR Team Penske	Ford FG X Falcon	42	+9.6 s	11	102
7	7	(Australia) Todd Kelly	Nissan Motorsport	Nissan Altima L33	42	+12.5 s	14	96
8	18	(Australia) Lee Holdsworth	Team 18	Holden VF Commodore	42	+13.1 s	12	90
9	1	(Australia) Mark Winterbottom	Prodrive Racing Australia	Ford FG X Falcon	42	+14.5 s	5	84
10	33	(New Zealand) Scott McLaughlin	Garry Rogers Motorsport	Volvo S60	42	+15.4 s	15	78
11	888	(Australia) Craig Lowndes	Triple Eight Race Engineering	Holden VF Commodore	42	+15.8 s	7	72
12	8	(Australia) Jason Bright	Brad Jones Racing	Holden VF Commodore	42	+16.5 s	24	69
13	14	(Australia) Tim Slade	Brad Jones Racing	Holden VF Commodore	42	+21.7 s	8	66
14	111	(New Zealand) Chris Pither	Super Black Racing	Ford FG X Falcon	42	+27.7 s	19	63
15	15	(Australia) Rick Kelly	Nissan Motorsport	Nissan Altima L33	42	+28.2 s	10	60
16	97	(New Zealand) Shane van Gisbergen	Triple Eight Race Engineering	Holden VF Commodore	42	+28.6 s	1	57
17	9	(Australia) David Reynolds	Erebus Motorsport	Holden VF Commodore	42	+34.1 s	16	54
18	3	(New Zealand) Andre Heimgartner	Lucas Dumbrell Motorsport	Holden VF Commodore	42	+34.3 s	18	51
19	21	(Australia) Tim Blanchard	Britek Motorsport	Holden VF Commodore	42	+35.6 s	23	48
20	96	(Australia) Dale Wood	Nissan Motorsport	Nissan Altima L33	42	+36.4 s	21	45
21	22	(Australia) James Courtney	Holden Racing Team	Holden VF Commodore	42	+42.8 s	17	42
22	4	(Australia) Aaren Russell	Erebus Motorsport	Holden VF Commodore	42	+43.7 s	26	39
23	2	(Australia) Garth Tander	Holden Racing Team	Holden VF Commodore	37	+5 laps	25	36
24	6	(Australia) Cam Waters	Prodrive Racing Australia	Ford FG X Falcon	33	+9 laps	13	33
Ret	34	(Australia) James Moffat	Garry Rogers Motorsport	Volvo S60	27	Power steering	20	
Ret	222	(Australia) Nick Percat	Lucas Dumbrell Motorsport	Holden VF Commodore	0	Suspension	22	

=== Race 13 ===
==== Qualifying ====
Pos.	No.	Driver	Team	Car	Time
1	888	(Australia) Craig Lowndes	Triple Eight Race Engineering	Holden VF Commodore	1:06.0259
2	15	(Australia) Rick Kelly	Nissan Motorsport	Nissan Altima L33	1:06.1400
3	55	(Australia) Chaz Mostert	Rod Nash Racing	Ford FG X Falcon	1:06.2011
4	14	(Australia) Tim Slade	Brad Jones Racing	Holden VF Commodore	1:06.2103
5	23	(Australia) Michael Caruso	Nissan Motorsport	Nissan Altima L33	1:06.2117
6	33	(New Zealand) Scott McLaughlin	Garry Rogers Motorsport	Volvo S60	1:06.2796
7	97	(New Zealand) Shane van Gisbergen	Triple Eight Race Engineering	Holden VF Commodore	1:06.2806
8	1	(Australia) Mark Winterbottom	Prodrive Racing Australia	Ford FG X Falcon	1:06.3022
9	88	(Australia) Jamie Whincup	Triple Eight Race Engineering	Holden VF Commodore	1:06.3321
10	7	(Australia) Todd Kelly	Nissan Motorsport	Nissan Altima L33	1:06.3579
11	17	(Australia) Scott Pye	DJR Team Penske	Ford FG X Falcon	1:06.3847
12	19	(Australia) Will Davison	Tekno Autosports	Holden VF Commodore	1:06.3912
13	21	(Australia) Tim Blanchard	Britek Motorsport	Holden VF Commodore	1:06.4028
14	9	(Australia) David Reynolds	Erebus Motorsport	Holden VF Commodore	1:06.4424
15	3	(New Zealand) Andre Heimgartner	Lucas Dumbrell Motorsport	Holden VF Commodore	1:06.4610
16	12	(New Zealand) Fabian Coulthard	DJR Team Penske	Ford FG X Falcon	1:06.4647
17	34	(Australia) James Moffat	Garry Rogers Motorsport	Volvo S60	1:06.4961
18	8	(Australia) Jason Bright	Brad Jones Racing	Holden VF Commodore	1:06.5004
19	18	(Australia) Lee Holdsworth	Team 18	Holden VF Commodore	1:06.5222
20	22	(Australia) James Courtney	Holden Racing Team	Holden VF Commodore	1:06.5435
21	2	(Australia) Garth Tander	Holden Racing Team	Holden VF Commodore	1:06.5507
22	222	(Australia) Nick Percat	Lucas Dumbrell Motorsport	Holden VF Commodore	1:06.6076
23	6	(Australia) Cam Waters	Prodrive Racing Australia	Ford FG X Falcon	1:06.6121
24	111	(New Zealand) Chris Pither	Super Black Racing	Ford FG X Falcon	1:06.6494
25	96	(Australia) Dale Wood	Nissan Motorsport	Nissan Altima L33	1:06.7700
26	4	(Australia) Aaren Russell	Erebus Motorsport	Holden VF Commodore	1:07.0146

==== Top Ten Shootout ====
Pos.	No.	Driver	Team	Car	Time
1	97	(New Zealand) Shane van Gisbergen	Triple Eight Race Engineering	Holden VF Commodore	1:06.6797
2	7	(Australia) Todd Kelly	Nissan Motorsport	Nissan Altima L33	1:06.7320
3	1	(Australia) Mark Winterbottom	Prodrive Racing Australia	Ford FG X Falcon	1:06.7520
4	14	(Australia) Tim Slade	Brad Jones Racing	Holden VF Commodore	1:06.7707
5	15	(Australia) Rick Kelly	Nissan Motorsport	Nissan Altima L33	1:06.8294
6	888	(Australia) Craig Lowndes	Triple Eight Race Engineering	Holden VF Commodore	1:06.8649
7	33	(New Zealand) Scott McLaughlin	Garry Rogers Motorsport	Volvo S60	1:06.8789
8	55	(Australia) Chaz Mostert	Rod Nash Racing	Ford FG X Falcon	1:06.9717
9	23	(Australia) Michael Caruso	Nissan Motorsport	Nissan Altima L33	1:07.1646
10	88	(Australia) Jamie Whincup	Triple Eight Race Engineering	Holden VF Commodore	1:07.7893

==== Race ====
Pos.	No.	Driver	Team	Car	Laps	Time/Retired	Grid	Points
1	97	(New Zealand) Shane van Gisbergen	Triple Eight Race Engineering	Holden VF Commodore	70	1:32:52.6896	1	150
2	14	(Australia) Tim Slade	Brad Jones Racing	Holden VF Commodore	70	+1.6 s	4	138
3	888	(Australia) Craig Lowndes	Triple Eight Race Engineering	Holden VF Commodore	70	+2.0 s	6	129
4	19	(Australia) Will Davison	Tekno Autosports	Holden VF Commodore	70	+2.6 s	12	120
5	22	(Australia) James Courtney	Holden Racing Team	Holden VF Commodore	70	+6.2 s	20	111
6	23	(Australia) Michael Caruso	Nissan Motorsport	Nissan Altima L33	70	+7.5 s	9	102
7	33	(New Zealand) Scott McLaughlin	Garry Rogers Motorsport	Volvo S60	70	+8.2 s	7	96
8	88	(Australia) Jamie Whincup	Triple Eight Race Engineering	Holden VF Commodore	70	+8.8 s	10	90
9	9	(Australia) David Reynolds	Erebus Motorsport	Holden VF Commodore	70	+9.2 s	14	84
10	34	(Australia) James Moffat	Garry Rogers Motorsport	Volvo S60	70	+9.9 s	17	78
11	111	(New Zealand) Chris Pither	Super Black Racing	Ford FG X Falcon	70	+10.3 s	24	72
12	3	(New Zealand) Andre Heimgartner	Lucas Dumbrell Motorsport	Holden VF Commodore	70	+11.1 s	15	69
13	7	(Australia) Todd Kelly	Nissan Motorsport	Nissan Altima L33	70	+11.5 s	2	66
14	2	(Australia) Garth Tander	Holden Racing Team	Holden VF Commodore	70	+12.0 s	21	63
15	15	(Australia) Rick Kelly	Nissan Motorsport	Nissan Altima L33	70	+13.3 s	5	60
16	8	(Australia) Jason Bright	Brad Jones Racing	Holden VF Commodore	70	+14.0 s	18	57
17	222	(Australia) Nick Percat	Lucas Dumbrell Motorsport	Holden VF Commodore	70	+15.7 s	22	54
18	96	(Australia) Dale Wood	Nissan Motorsport	Nissan Altima L33	70	+16.1 s	25	51
19	4	(Australia) Aaren Russell	Erebus Motorsport	Holden VF Commodore	70	+24.7 s	26	48
20	1	(Australia) Mark Winterbottom	Prodrive Racing Australia	Ford FG X Falcon	70	+45.7 s	3	45
21	21	(Australia) Tim Blanchard	Britek Motorsport	Holden VF Commodore	69	+1 lap	13	42
22	6	(Australia) Cam Waters	Prodrive Racing Australia	Ford FG X Falcon	64	+6 laps	23	39
23	55	(Australia) Chaz Mostert	Rod Nash Racing	Ford FG X Falcon	55	+15 laps	8	36
Ret	17	(Australia) Scott Pye	DJR Team Penske	Ford FG X Falcon	7	Suspension	11	
Ret	12	(New Zealand) Fabian Coulthard	DJR Team Penske	Ford FG X Falcon	0	Accident	16	
Ret	18	(Australia) Lee Holdsworth	Team 18	Holden VF Commodore	0	Accident	19	

== Championship standings after the event ==
- After Race 13 of 29. Only the top five positions are included for both sets of standings.

Drivers' Championship standings

	Pos.	Driver	Points
2	1	(Australia) Jamie Whincup	1275
2	2	(Australia) Craig Lowndes	1245
1	3	(New Zealand) Scott McLaughlin	1230
3	4	(Australia) Mark Winterbottom	1212
	5	(New Zealand) Shane van Gisbergen	1204

Teams' Championship standings

	Pos.	Constructor	Points
	1	Triple Eight Race Engineering	2489
	2	Prodrive Racing Australia	1912
	3	Garry Rogers Motorsport	1854
	4	Holden Racing Team	1831
1	5	Brad Jones Racing	1818
