= Shae Davies =

Australian professional racing driver

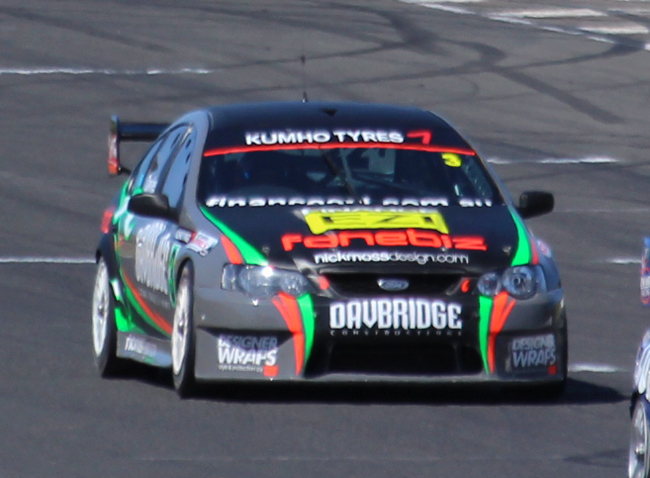
- Davies' 2013 Kumho Tyres V8 Touring Car Series car
- Nationality: Australian
- Born: Shae William James Davies; 8 March 1990 (age 36) Brisbane, Queensland

S5000 Australian Drivers' Championship career
- Debut season: 2022
- Current team: Versa Motorsport
- Categorisation: FIA Silver
- Car number: 8
- Starts: 9
- Wins: 1
- Podiums: 1
- Poles: 0

Previous series
- 2020–2021, 2024 2019 2014–2018 2016 2014–15 2012–14 2010–12: Boost Mobile Super Trucks; GT Challenge Europe; Super2 Series; Supercars Championship; V8SuperTourer; Porsche Carrera Cup Australia; Australian Formula Ford

Championship titles
- 2013: V8 Touring Car Series

Supercars Championship career
- Championships: 0
- Races: 15
- Wins: 0
- Podiums: 0
- Pole positions: 0
- Statistics up to date as of 14 May 2025.

Shae William James Davies (born 8 March 1990) is an Australian professional racing driver. A Super2 Series veteran, Davies briefly drove for Erebus Motorsport during the 2016 V8 Supercars season. He currently competes in the S5000 Australian Drivers' Championship and Tasman Series.

Davies began competing outside of Australia in 2019 after sponsorship issues prevented him from continuing the Supercars developmental ladder. In 2019, he raced for Belgian Audi Club Team WRT in the Blancpain GT World Challenge Europe. He returned to Australia in 2020 to compete in the Boost Mobile Super Trucks. In his maiden Super Trucks race weekend at the Adelaide 500, he won the third round after taking the lead following the competition caution. The following year, he won twice at Tasmania and Darwin to tie with Paul Morris for the Boost Mobile Super Trucks championship, losing on a tiebreaker as Morris had four wins.

When the Boost Mobile Super Trucks shut down after the 2021 season, Davies joined Versa Motorsport in the S5000 Australian Drivers' Championship and Tasman Series for 2022.

== Career results ==
=== Karting career summary ===
Season	Series	Position
2009	Queensland Sprint Kart Championship - Rotax Light	**3rd**

=== Circuit racing results ===
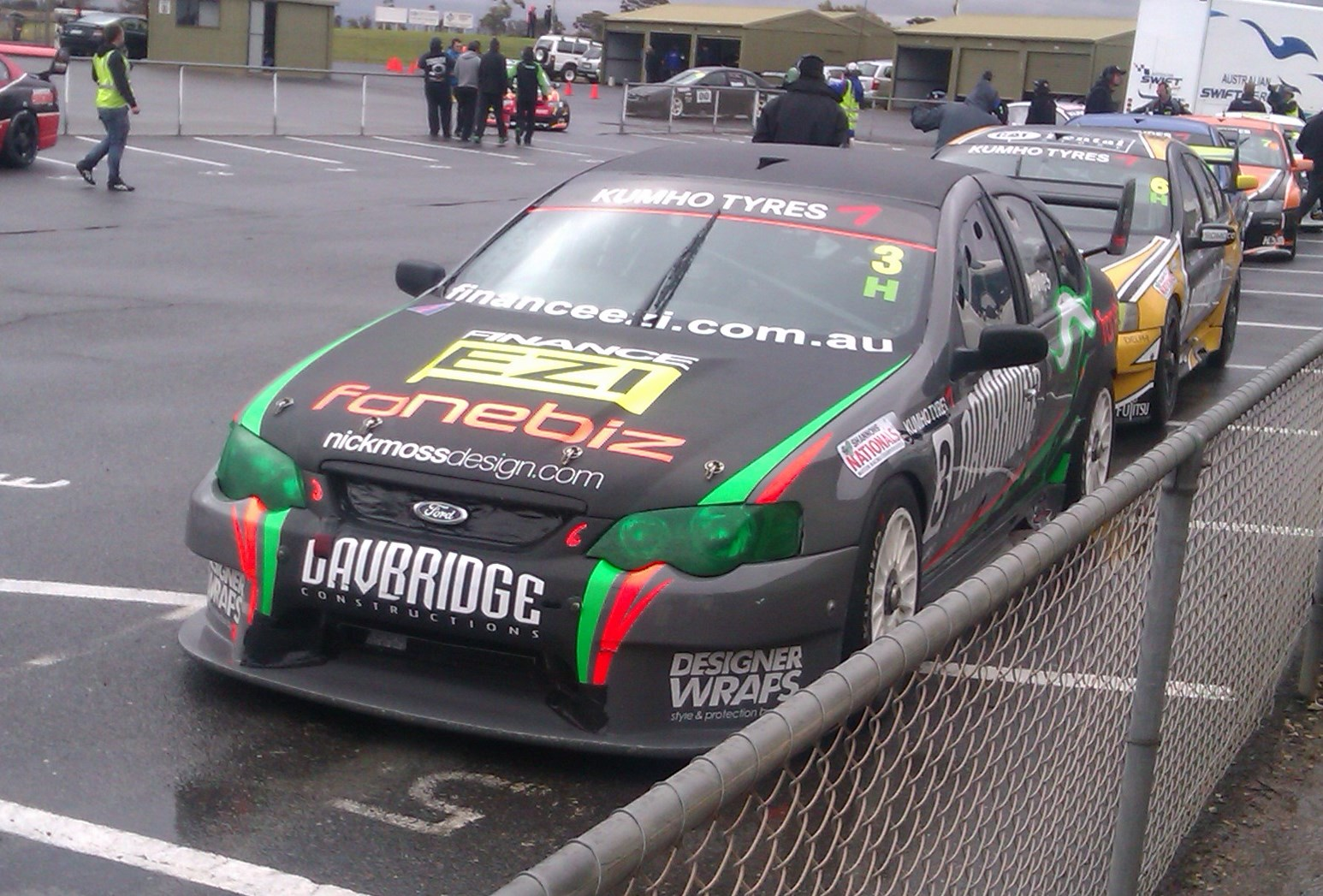
Davies' 2013 Kumho Tyres V8 Touring Car Series car at Mallala Motor Sport Park

Season	Series	Position	Car	Team
2010	Australian Formula Ford Championship	21st	Van Diemen RF06	Shae Davies/BF Racing
2011	Australian Formula Ford Championship	10th	Spectrum 011c	Synergy Motorsport
2012	Australian Formula Ford Championship	4th	Spectrum 014	Borland Racing Developments
2012	SCCA F1600 Championship Series	9th	Spectrum 011	Cape Motorsports w/ Wayne Taylor Racing
2012	Porsche City Index Carrera Cup	18th	Porsche 997 GT3 Cup	Porsche Cars Australia
2013	Kumho Tyres V8 Touring Car Series	**1st**	Ford BF Falcon	Fernandez Motorsport
2013	Porsche Carrera Cup Australia Championship	6th	Porsche 911 GT3 Cup	Porsche Cars Australia
2014	Porsche Carrera Cup Australia Championship	4th	Porsche 911 GT3 Cup	McElrea Racing
2014	Dunlop V8 Supercar Series	35th	Ford FG Falcon	Matt Stone Racing
2015	Porsche Carrera Cup Australia Championship	10th	Porsche 911 GT3 Cup	Scott Taylor Motorsport
2015	Dunlop V8 Supercar Series	8th	Ford FG Falcon	Matt Stone Racing
2016	Supercars Dunlop Series	10th	Ford FG Falcon	MW Motorsport
2016	International V8 Supercars Championship	36th	Holden VF Commodore	Erebus Motorsport
2017	Dunlop Super2 Series	5th	Nissan Altima L33	MW Motorsport
2017	Virgin Australia Supercars Championship	53rd	Nissan Altima L33	MW Motorsport
2018	Dunlop Super2 Series	12th	Ford FG X Falcon	Paul Morris Motorsport
2019	Blancpain GT World Challenge Europe	21st	Audi R8 LMS Evo	Belgian Audi Club Team WRT
2020	Boost Mobile Super Trucks	N/A	Stadium Super Truck	Darwin Triple Crown
2021	Boost Mobile Super Trucks	**2nd**	Stadium Super Truck	Darwin Triple Crown, Townsville 500, Mount Margaret Estate
2022	S5000 Australian Series	10th	Rogers AF01- Ford V8	Versa Motorsport
2024	Stadium Super Trucks	5th	Stadium Super Truck	Codefish/Davbridge

=== Supercars Championship results ===
Supercars results
Year	Team	Car	1	2	3	4	5	6	7	8	9	10	11	12	13	14	15	16	17	18	19	20	21	22	23	24	25	26	27	28	29	Position	Points
2016	Erebus Motorsport	Holden VF Commodore	ADE; R1	ADE; R2	ADE; R3	SYM; R4	SYM; R5	PHI; R6	PHI; R7	BAR; R8	BAR; R9	WIN; R10; PO	WIN; R11; PO	HID; R12	HID; R13	TOW; R14	TOW; R15	QLD; R16; PO	QLD; R17; PO	SMP; R18; 25	SMP; R19; 25	SAN; R20; 22	BAT; R21; 17	SUR; R22; 19	SUR; R23; DNS	PUK; R24; 23	PUK; R25; 25	PUK; R26; 24	PUK; R27; 23	SYD; R28; 22	SYD; R29; 17	36th	454
2017	MW Motorsport	Nissan Altima L33	ADE; R1	ADE; R2	SYM; R3	SYM; R4	PHI; R5	PHI; R6	BAR; R7	BAR; R8	WIN; R9; 18	WIN; R10; 24	HID; R11	HID; R12	TOW; R13	TOW; R14	QLD; R15; 25	QLD; R16; 22	SMP; R17	SMP; R18	SAN; R19	BAT; R20	SUR; R21	SUR; R22	PUK; R23	PUK; R24	NEW; R25	NEW; R26				53rd	153

=== Bathurst 1000 results ===
Year	Team	Car	Co-driver	Position	Lap
2016	Erebus Motorsport	Holden Commodore VF	(New Zealand) Chris van der Drift	17th	156

=== Boost Mobile Super Trucks ===
(key) (Bold – Pole position. Italics – Fastest qualifier. * – Most laps led.)

Boost Mobile Super Trucks results
Year	1	2	3	4	5	6	7	8	9	BMSTC	Pts	Ref
2020	ADE; 4	ADE; 10	ADE; 1							N/A^{1}	–	
2021	SYM; 5	**SYM**; 2	SYM; 1	HID; 3	HID; 2	HID; 1	**TOW**; 2	TOW; 7	TOW; 3	2nd	93	
2024	LBH	LBH	ADE; 4	ADE; 2						5th	50	

^{1} Standings were not recorded by the series for the 2020 season.

=== Complete S5000 results ===
Year	Series	Team	1	2	3	4	5	6	7	8	9	10	11	12	13	14	Position	Points
2022	Australian	SYM; R1	SYM; R2	SYM; R3	PHI; R4; 6	PHI; R5; 6	PHI; R6; Ret	MEL; R7; 15	MEL; R8; 1	MEL; R9; 14	SMP; R10; 5	SMP; R11; 5	SMP; R12; 6	HID; R13	HID; R14	HID; R15	10th	99
