= Aaren Russell =

Australian motor-racing driver (born 1991)

- Nationality: Australian
- Born: Aaren Leigh Russell; 22 August 1991 (age 34) Newcastle, New South Wales
- Relatives: Wayne Russell (father); Drew Russell (brother)

Supercars Championship career
- Championships: 0
- Races: 33
- Wins: 0
- Podiums: 0
- Pole positions: 0

Aaren Leigh Russell (born 22 August 1991) is an Australian motor-racing driver in the Virgin Australia Supercars Championship.

== Career history ==
=== Junior formulae ===
In 2008 and 2009, Russell competed in the NSW Formula Vee championship, a stepping stone taken by several current main series V8 Supercars drivers. After placing eighth in his 2008 rookie season and second in 2009, the Development V8 Supercar Series, the second tier of V8 Supercars racing, became his next target.

=== Development Series ===
Russell moved into the Development Series in 2010 with family team Novocastrian Motorsport. His debut year saw him finish ninth in the championship. While he matched this feat in 2013, he would not improve on this championship position until 2014, when he finished seventh. During the 2014 Dunlop Series, Russell received two round podiums, one at Queensland Raceway and one at Sydney Olympic Park. In the 2015 Dunlop V8 Supercar Series, Russell moved teams to drive for Paul Morris Motorsport.

=== Supercars Championship ===
In 2015, Russell, alongside his brother Drew Russell, competed in the 2015 Supercheap Auto Bathurst 1000 in a wildcard entry run by family team Novocastrian Motorsport. The entry finished 17th and on the lead lap.

In 2016, Russell signed for Erebus Motorsport to drive a Holden VF Commodore in the 2016 International V8 Supercars Championship, which will be his first full-time drive in the main series. This relationship ended after the Townsville round when major sponsor Plus Fitness dropped their support for the team. He then joined Lucas Dumbrell Motorsport to partner Andre Heimgartner in the Pirtek Enduro Cup series.

In 2017, he returned to the Lucas Dumbrell Motorsport team for initially three rounds starting at the Townsville 400, but including the Bathurst 1000 and Newcastle 500. This deal was later extended to include the Sandown 500 and Gold Coast 600.

For 2018, Russell ran as a co-driver to Heimgartner at Nissan Motorsport for the endurance races. He won the co-driver qualifying race at the Sandown 500 after a mid-race hailstorm disrupted the race order. The pairing finished 16th and were the last car on the lead lap at the 2018 Bathurst 1000.

== Career results ==
Season	Series	Position	Car	Team
2008	Australian Formula Vee National Series	10th	Elfin NG - VW	Novocastrian Motorsport
2009	Australian Formula Vee National Series	5th	Stinger - VW	Novocastrian Motorsport
2010	Fujitsu V8 Supercars Series	9th	Ford BF Falcon	Novocastrian Motorsport
2011	Fujitsu V8 Supercars Series	13th	Ford BF Falcon	Novocastrian Motorsport
2012	Dunlop V8 Supercar Series	15th	Ford BF Falcon	Novocastrian Motorsport
2013	Dunlop V8 Supercar Series	9th	Ford FG Falcon	Novocastrian Motorsport
2014	Dunlop V8 Supercar Series	7th	Ford FG Falcon	Novocastrian Motorsport
2015	V8 Supercars Dunlop Series	11th	Ford FG Falcon	Paul Morris Motorsport
2015	International V8 Supercars Championship	52nd	Holden VF Commodore	Novocastrian Motorsport
2016	International V8 Supercars Championship	28th	Holden VF Commodore	Erebus Motorsport; Lucas Dumbrell Motorsport
2017	Supercars Championship	48th	Holden VF Commodore	Lucas Dumbrell Motorsport
2018	Supercars Championship	42nd	Nissan Altima L33	Nissan Motorsport
2022	Australian Production Car Series	2nd	BMW M3	Novocastrian Motorsport

=== V8 Supercars Development Series results ===
(key) (Race results only)

V8 Supercars Development Series results
Year	Team	Car	1	2	3	4	5	6	7	8	9	10	11	12	13	14	15	16	17	18	Position	Points
2010	Novocastrian Motorsport	Ford Falcon BF	ADE; 1; 12	ADE; 2; 13	IPS; 1; 18	IPS; 2; 15	IPS; 3; 13	WIN; 1; 8	WIN; 2; 15	WIN; 3; 8	TSV; 1; 12	TSV; 2; 10	TSV; 3; 13	BAT; 1; 12	BAT; 2; 10	SAN; 1; 11	SAN; 2; 16	SAN; 3; 14	SOP; 1; 10	SOP; 2 Ret	9th	920
2011	Novocastrian Motorsport	Ford Falcon BF	ADE; 1; 21	ADE; 2 Ret	PER; 1; 16	PER; 2; 10	TSV; 1 Ret	TSV; 2; 26	TSV; 3; 15	IPS; 1; 21	IPS; 2; 17	IPS; 3; 13	BAT; 1; 13	BAT; 2; 11	SAN; 1; 16	SAN; 2; 12	SAN; 3; 15	SOP; 1; 12	SOP; 2; 15		13th	733
2012	Novocastrian Motorsport	Ford Falcon BF	ADE; 1; 18	ADE; 2; 13	PER; 1; 16	PER; 2; 14	PER; 3; 13	TSV; 1; 14	TSV; 2; 15	TSV; 3; 19	IPS; 1; 17	IPS; 2; 13	IPS; 3; 16	BAT; 1; 10	BAT; 2 Ret	WIN; 1; 14	WIN; 2; 6	WIN; 3; 18	SOP; 1; 7	SOP; 2 Ret	15th	723
2013	Novocastrian Motorsport	Ford Falcon FG	ADE; 1; 9	ADE; 2; 6	PER; 1; 19	PER; 2; 17	PER; 3; 13	TSV; 1; 4	TSV; 2; 7	TSV; 3; 6	IPS; 1; 13	IPS; 2; 9	IPS; 3; 6	WIN; 1 Ret	WIN; 2; 23	WIN; 3; 23	BAT; 1; 10	BAT; 2; 27	SOP; 1; 8	SOP; 2; 8	9th	1008
2014	Novocastrian Motorsport	Ford Falcon FG	ADE; 1; 9	ADE; 2; 13	WIN; 1; 28	WIN; 2; 14	PER; 1; 12	PER; 2; 8	TSV; 1; 4	TSV; 2; 24	IPS; 1; 2	IPS; 2; 8	BAT; 6	SOP; 1; 3	SOP; 2; 2						7th	1220
2015	Novocastrian Motorsport	Ford Falcon FG	ADE; 1; 6	ADE; 2; 3	PER; 1; 5	PER; 2; 23	PER; 3; 24	WIN; 1; 25	WIN; 2; 14	WIN; 3; 7	TSV; 1; 8	TSV; 2 Ret	IPS; 1; 9	IPS; 2 Ret	IPS; 3; 14	BAT; 20	SOP; 1; 9	SOP; 2; 7			11th	935

=== Complete Supercars Championship results ===
Supercars results
Year	Team	Car	1	2	3	4	5	6	7	8	9	10	11	12	13	14	15	16	17	18	19	20	21	22	23	24	25	26	27	28	29	30	31	32	33	34	35	36	Position	Points
2015	Lucas Dumbrell Motorsport	Holden VF Commodore	ADE; R1	ADE; R2	ADE; R3	SYM; R4	SYM; R5	SYM; R6	BAR; R7	BAR; R8	BAR; R9	WIN; R10	WIN; R11	WIN; R12	HID; R13	HID; R14	HID; R15	TOW; R16	TOW; R17	QLD; R18; PO	QLD; R19; PO	QLD; R20; PO	SMP; R21	SMP; R22	SMP; R23	SAN; R24													52nd	108
2015	Novocastrian Motorsport	Holden VF Commodore																									BAT; R25; 17	SUR; R26	SUR; R27	PUK; R28	PUK; R29	PUK; R30	PHI; R31	PHI; R32	PHI; R33	SYD; R34	SYD; R35	SYD; R36	52nd	108
2016	Erebus Motorsport	Holden VF Commodore	ADE; R1; 25	ADE; R2; 22	ADE; R3; DNS	SYM; R4; 23	SYM; R5; 17	PHI; R6; 25	PHI; R7; 22	BAR; R8; 25	BAR; R9; 24	WIN; R10; 24	WIN; R11; 24	HID; R12; 22	HID; R13; 19	TOW; R14; 22	TOW; R15; 21	QLD; R16	QLD; R17	SMP; R18	SMP; R19																		28th	627
2016	Lucas Dumbrell Motorsport	Holden VF Commodore																				SAN; QR; 17	SAN; R20; 19	BAT; R21; Ret	SUR; R22; 13	SUR; R23; Ret	PUK; R24	PUK; R25	PUK; R26	PUK; R27	SYD; R28	SYD; R29							28th	627
2017	Lucas Dumbrell Motorsport	Holden VF Commodore	ADE; R1	ADE; R2	SYM; R3	SYM; R4	PHI; R5	PHI; R6	BAR; R7	BAR; R8	WIN; R9	WIN; R10	HID; R11	HID; R12	TOW; R13; 22	TOW; R14; 25	QLD; R15	QLD; R16	SMP; R17	SMP; R18	SAN; QR; 20	SAN; R19; Ret	BAT; R20; 17	SUR; R21; Ret	SUR; R22; Ret	PUK; R23; 21	PUK; R24; 21	NEW; R25; Ret	NEW; R26; 19										48th	309
2018	Nissan Motorsport	Nissan Altima L33	ADE; R1	ADE; R2	MEL; R3	MEL; R4	MEL; R5	MEL; R6	SYM; R7	SYM; R8	PHI; R9	PHI; R10	BAR; R11	BAR; R12	WIN; R13; PO	WIN; R14; PO	HID; R15	HID; R16	TOW; R17	TOW; R18	QLD; R19; PO	QLD; R20; PO	SMP; R21	BEN; R22	BEN; R23	SAN; QR; 1	SAN; R24; 14	BAT; R25; 16	SUR; R26; 19	SUR; R27; C	PUK; R28	PUK; R29	NEW; R30	NEW; R31					42nd	288

=== Complete Bathurst 1000 results ===
Year	Team	Car	Co-driver	Position	Laps
2015	Novocastrian Motorsport	Holden Commodore VF	(Australia) Drew Russell	17th	161
2016	Lucas Dumbrell Motorsport	Holden Commodore VF	(New Zealand) Andre Heimgartner	DNF	114
2017	Lucas Dumbrell Motorsport	Holden Commodore VF	(Australia) Taz Douglas	17th	154
2018	Nissan Motorsport	Nissan Altima L33	(New Zealand) André Heimgartner	16th	161

=== Complete Bathurst 6 Hour results ===
Year	Team	Co-drivers	Car	Class	Laps	Pos.	Class pos.
2022	(Australia) Novacastrian Motorsport	(Australia) Drew Russell (Australia) Wayne Russell	BMW M3 F80	X	129	5th	4th
2023	(Australia) Novacastrian Motorsport	(Australia) Drew Russell (Australia) Wayne Russell	BMW M3 F80	X	112	2nd	2nd
