= 2016 Winton SuperSprint =

2016 V8 Supercar championship race

(Victoria (state)) 2016 Woodstock Winton SuperSprint
Event Information
- Round 5 of 14 in the 2016 International V8 Supercars Championship
- Date: 20–22 May 2016
- Location: Winton, Victoria
- Venue: Winton Motor Raceway
- Weather: Friday: fine Saturday: fine Sunday: fine

Results
Race 1
Distance	40 laps	120 km
Pole position	Tim Slade; Brad Jones Racing	1:19.0660
Winner	Tim Slade; Brad Jones Racing	54:40.4946
Race 2
Distance	67 laps	200 km
Pole position	Chaz Mostert; Rod Nash Racing	1:18.7603
Winner	Tim Slade; Brad Jones Racing	1:33:49.3933

The 2016 Woodstock Winton SuperSprint was a motor racing event for V8 Supercars, held on the weekend of 20 to 22 May 2016. The event was held at Winton Motor Raceway in Winton, Victoria, and consisted of one race of 120 kilometres and one race of 200 km in length. It was the fifth event of fourteen in the 2016 International V8 Supercars Championship and hosted Races 10 and 11 of the season. The event was the 29th running of the Winton SuperSprint.

Tim Slade dominated the event, winning both races and also taking pole position for Race 10. The Race 10 win was Slade's first in the series. Mark Winterbottom finished on the podium in both races, with a third and a second place, to take the championship lead at the end of the event. Scott McLaughlin led the championship after Race 10 where he finished second to Slade, but he could only finish eleventh in Race 11. The Race 11 podium was completed by Fabian Coulthard, who scored his second podium finish of the season. Chaz Mostert had started the race on pole position, but an incident later in the race meant he would only finish 20th.

== Report ==
=== Background ===
The circuit was resurfaced in January 2016, with the profile of Turns 10 and 12 changed in the process. Several teams tested at the circuit in February, with drivers reporting that the new surface made the circuit more challenging. Drivers found that the new surface provided good grip for the tyres, yet was slippery off the racing line, which led to a number of drivers going off the circuit.

Craig Lowndes entered the event as the championship leader, courtesy of a strong weekend at Barbagallo two weeks previously, ahead of his teammate Jamie Whincup.

=== Practice ===
A 30-minute practice session was held on Friday afternoon for additional drivers, consisting mostly of Enduro Cup co-drivers. Steve Owen, driving Chaz Mostert's car, set the fastest time of 1:20.3098 during the session ahead of Jack Le Brocq and Dean Fiore. Only 25 cars took part in the session, with Shane van Gisbergen's co-driver Alexandre Prémat not available for the event.

The first session for championship drivers also took place on Friday afternoon and was one hour in duration. The new track surface led to fast lap times, with Tim Slade setting a new practice lap record of 1:19.2435. Cam Waters was second fastest ahead of Scott McLaughlin. Non-regular drivers Alex Rullo and Richie Stanaway completed laps during the session, driving the cars of Andre Heimgartner and Chris Pither respectively. Rick Kelly missed the majority of the session due to an issue with the clutch on his car.

A second one-hour session was held later on Friday afternoon and was topped by Van Gisbergen, who set a time of 1:19.3311. Rick Kelly was second fastest ahead of Van Gisbergen's teammates Whincup and Lowndes. Whincup missed 20 minutes of the session while his team fixed a broken suspension component. Dirt was dragged onto the circuit in several places as a result of the higher speeds being achieved by drivers, causing lap times to not be as fast as expected. The problem was resolved overnight, with the track organisers sweeping loose dirt away from the edge of the circuit. The session also saw the trial of a new speed limiter system to be used during safety car periods, which would limit the cars to 100 km/h when catching up to the safety car.

A final practice session was held on Saturday morning and was 15 minutes in length. Mark Winterbottom lowered the practice lap record even further with a time of 1:19.0469. DJR Team Penske teammates Scott Pye and Fabian Coulthard were second and third fastest ahead of McLaughlin and Pither. Nick Percat failed to complete a lap due to an engine problem.

Practice summary
Session	Day	Fastest lap				
Session	Day	No.	Driver	Team	Car	Time
Additional Driver Practice	Friday	55	(Australia) Steve Owen	Rod Nash Racing	Ford FG X Falcon	1:20.3098
Practice 1	Friday	14	(Australia) Tim Slade	Brad Jones Racing	Holden VF Commodore	1:19.2435
Practice 2	Friday	97	(New Zealand) Shane van Gisbergen	Triple Eight Race Engineering	Holden VF Commodore	1:19.3311
Practice 3	Saturday	1	(Australia) Mark Winterbottom	Prodrive Racing Australia	Ford FG X Falcon	1:19.0469

=== Qualifying – Race 10 ===
Qualifying for Race 10 was held on Saturday afternoon and consisted of a single 15-minute session. Slade took his first pole position since 2012, and the first for Holden in the 2016 season, with a time of 1:19.0660. Winterbottom was second fastest ahead of his teammate Waters, with McLaughlin and Rick Kelly completing the top five. Lucas Dumbrell Motorsport were unable to replace the engine in Percat's car prior to the session and he did not take to the circuit, leaving him to start from the back of the grid in the race.

=== Race 10 ===
Race 10 took place on Saturday afternoon, with regulations requiring each car to make at least one pit stop to change all four tyres after lap 4. Slade maintained first place at the start while McLaughlin moved into second at the first corner. Contact between James Moffat, Garth Tander and Dale Wood damaged a steering arm on Moffat's car, causing him to lose five laps while repairs were carried out. Tander suffered a puncture, forcing him to pit at the end of the first lap. Waters, Van Gisbergen and Lowndes were the first drivers to complete their pit stops, coming in at the end of lap 4. Slade stopped on lap 9, followed by McLaughlin on lap 10 and Winterbottom on lap 12. On lap 17, Waters and James Courtney made contact going into Turn 5, leading to a spin for Waters and both drivers going off the circuit. Both drivers lost a number of positions while they rejoined the circuit.

Slade regained the lead when Coulthard made his pit stop on lap 27, with McLaughlin in second place ahead of Winterbottom and Rick Kelly. Slade went on to win by over four seconds, with McLaughlin struggling for pace. Winterbottom, Rick Kelly, Whincup, Davison and Mostert completed the top seven, all finishing within 3.5 seconds of McLaughlin. Slade said of his victory, which was his first in 227 attempts: "Finally. Man, what a feeling ... Thanks to everyone who has supported me. It’s a pretty crazy feeling." With Lowndes finishing in 15th place, McLaughlin assumed the championship lead ahead of Whincup.

=== Qualifying – Race 11 ===
Mostert took his third pole position in qualifying for Race 11, which was a single 20-minute session held on Sunday morning. Coulthard was second fastest ahead of Lowndes, both within one one-hundredth of a second of Mostert's time, while Slade was fourth fastest.

=== Race 11 ===
Race 11 was held on Sunday afternoon and the race regulations required each car to take on at least 120 litres of fuel during the race. Coulthard took the lead at the start of the race, ahead of Mostert and Lowndes. Winterbottom, Courtney and Van Gisbergen, all on a three-stop strategy, each made their first pit stop at the end of the first lap. Mostert stopped at the end of lap 2, followed by Lowndes and Rick Kelly on lap 4. Coulthard and Slade, both on a two-stop strategy, made the first of their pit stops on lap 18. The safety car was deployed on lap 19 to allow Lee Holdsworth's car, which had stopped with a gearbox problem, to be recovered. Several drivers on a three-stop strategy, including Lowndes, Winterbottom and Mostert, took the opportunity to complete the second of their pit stops.

Rick Kelly, who had not stopped under the safety car, led at the restart on lap 22 but was passed by Slade. Mostert had stopped twice under the safety car to meet the fuel requirement and did not need to pit again, but he made contact with Courtney at Turn 10. The incident caused a puncture on Mostert's car, while Courtney's had to be taken into the pit garage to be repaired, leaving him multiple laps off the lead. Winterbottom made his third and final pit stop on lap 24. Lowndes did the same on lap 25 and the pair collided at Turn 3 after Lowndes returned to the circuit, forcing him off the track. Slade made his second pit stop on lap 40 and emerged 1.5 seconds ahead of Winterbottom, while Coulthard stopped on lap 43.

McLaughlin and Percat were the last drivers to pit, doing so on lap 45. This left Slade in the lead ahead of Winterbottom, Van Gisbergen, Coulthard and Waters. With fresher tyres, Coulthard passed Van Gisbergen on lap 47 and then closed the gap to Winterbottom. However, he was unable to make a pass in the closing laps. Slade took victory by a margin of 6.7 seconds over Winterbottom and Coulthard, while Van Gisbergen finished fourth ahead of Waters and David Reynolds. Pye went off the circuit on the last lap and dropped to seventh, while Lowndes was eighth with a broken header on his car. McLaughlin finished eleventh, and as a result he lost the championship lead to Winterbottom.

==== Post-race ====
Van Gisbergen was given a 10-point penalty for careless driving after he made contact with Tander following the safety car restart.

== Results ==
=== Race 10 ===
==== Qualifying ====
Pos.	No.	Driver	Team	Car	Time
1	14	(Australia) Tim Slade	Brad Jones Racing	Holden VF Commodore	1:19.0660
2	1	(Australia) Mark Winterbottom	Prodrive Racing Australia	Ford FG X Falcon	1:19.0974
3	6	(Australia) Cam Waters	Prodrive Racing Australia	Ford FG X Falcon	1:19.2212
4	33	(New Zealand) Scott McLaughlin	Garry Rogers Motorsport	Volvo S60	1:19.2220
5	15	(Australia) Rick Kelly	Nissan Motorsport	Nissan Altima L33	1:19.2572
6	18	(Australia) Lee Holdsworth	Team 18	Holden VF Commodore	1:19.3031
7	19	(Australia) Will Davison	Tekno Autosports	Holden VF Commodore	1:19.3455
8	22	(Australia) James Courtney	Holden Racing Team	Holden VF Commodore	1:19.3491
9	88	(Australia) Jamie Whincup	Triple Eight Race Engineering	Holden VF Commodore	1:19.3632
10	55	(Australia) Chaz Mostert	Rod Nash Racing	Ford FG X Falcon	1:19.4005
11	97	(New Zealand) Shane van Gisbergen	Triple Eight Race Engineering	Holden VF Commodore	1:19.4051
12	23	(Australia) Michael Caruso	Nissan Motorsport	Nissan Altima L33	1:19.4590
13	7	(Australia) Todd Kelly	Nissan Motorsport	Nissan Altima L33	1:19.4688
14	888	(Australia) Craig Lowndes	Triple Eight Race Engineering	Holden VF Commodore	1:19.4813
15	12	(New Zealand) Fabian Coulthard	DJR Team Penske	Ford FG X Falcon	1:19.5187
16	8	(Australia) Jason Bright	Brad Jones Racing	Holden VF Commodore	1:19.5522
17	17	(Australia) Scott Pye	DJR Team Penske	Ford FG X Falcon	1:19.6180
18	21	(Australia) Tim Blanchard	Britek Motorsport	Holden VF Commodore	1:19.6463
19	111	(New Zealand) Chris Pither	Super Black Racing	Ford FG X Falcon	1:19.6592
20	9	(Australia) David Reynolds	Erebus Motorsport	Holden VF Commodore	1:19.7155
21	34	(Australia) James Moffat	Garry Rogers Motorsport	Volvo S60	1:19.8618
22	96	(Australia) Dale Wood	Nissan Motorsport	Nissan Altima L33	1:19.8988
23	2	(Australia) Garth Tander	Holden Racing Team	Holden VF Commodore	1:19.9036
24	3	(New Zealand) Andre Heimgartner	Lucas Dumbrell Motorsport	Holden VF Commodore	1:20.3264
25	4	(Australia) Aaren Russell	Erebus Motorsport	Holden VF Commodore	1:20.6258
–	222	(Australia) Nick Percat	Lucas Dumbrell Motorsport	Holden VF Commodore	No time

==== Race ====
Pos.	No.	Driver	Team	Car	Laps	Time/Retired	Grid	Points
1	14	(Australia) Tim Slade	Brad Jones Racing	Holden VF Commodore	40	54:40.4946	1	150
2	33	(New Zealand) Scott McLaughlin	Garry Rogers Motorsport	Volvo S60	40	+4.4 s	4	138
3	1	(Australia) Mark Winterbottom	Prodrive Racing Australia	Ford FG X Falcon	40	+4.6 s	2	129
4	15	(Australia) Rick Kelly	Nissan Motorsport	Nissan Altima L33	40	+5.2 s	5	120
5	88	(Australia) Jamie Whincup	Triple Eight Race Engineering	Holden VF Commodore	40	+5.5 s	9	111
6	19	(Australia) Will Davison	Tekno Autosports	Holden VF Commodore	40	+6.2 s	7	102
7	55	(Australia) Chaz Mostert	Rod Nash Racing	Ford FG X Falcon	40	+6.5 s	10	96
8	23	(Australia) Michael Caruso	Nissan Motorsport	Nissan Altima L33	40	+10.6 s	12	90
9	97	(New Zealand) Shane van Gisbergen	Triple Eight Race Engineering	Holden VF Commodore	40	+10.7 s	11	84
10	18	(Australia) Lee Holdsworth	Team 18	Holden VF Commodore	40	+11.0 s	6	78
11	8	(Australia) Jason Bright	Brad Jones Racing	Holden VF Commodore	40	+15.1 s	16	72
12	17	(Australia) Scott Pye	DJR Team Penske	Ford FG X Falcon	40	+15.5 s	17	69
13	7	(Australia) Todd Kelly	Nissan Motorsport	Nissan Altima L33	40	+15.9 s	13	66
14	96	(Australia) Dale Wood	Nissan Motorsport	Nissan Altima L33	40	+19.1 s	22	63
15	888	(Australia) Craig Lowndes	Triple Eight Race Engineering	Holden VF Commodore	40	+20.9 s	14	60
16	6	(Australia) Cam Waters	Prodrive Racing Australia	Ford FG X Falcon	40	+21.4 s	3	57
17	12	(New Zealand) Fabian Coulthard	DJR Team Penske	Ford FG X Falcon	40	+21.8 s	15	54
18	111	(New Zealand) Chris Pither	Super Black Racing	Ford FG X Falcon	40	+26.1 s	19	51
19	22	(Australia) James Courtney	Holden Racing Team	Holden VF Commodore	40	+26.6 s	8	48
20	21	(Australia) Tim Blanchard	Britek Motorsport	Holden VF Commodore	40	+28.2 s	18	45
21	222	(Australia) Nick Percat	Lucas Dumbrell Motorsport	Holden VF Commodore	40	+28.3 s	26	42
22	9	(Australia) David Reynolds	Erebus Motorsport	Holden VF Commodore	40	+30.4 s	20	39
23	3	(New Zealand) Andre Heimgartner	Lucas Dumbrell Motorsport	Holden VF Commodore	40	+41.9 s	24	36
24	4	(Australia) Aaren Russell	Erebus Motorsport	Holden VF Commodore	40	+47.9 s	25	33
25	2	(Australia) Garth Tander	Holden Racing Team	Holden VF Commodore	39	+1 lap	23	30
26	34	(Australia) James Moffat	Garry Rogers Motorsport	Volvo S60	35	+5 laps	21	27

=== Race 11 ===
==== Qualifying ====
Pos.	No.	Driver	Team	Car	Time
1	55	(Australia) Chaz Mostert	Rod Nash Racing	Ford FG X Falcon	1:18.7603
2	12	(New Zealand) Fabian Coulthard	DJR Team Penske	Ford FG X Falcon	1:18.7661
3	888	(Australia) Craig Lowndes	Triple Eight Race Engineering	Holden VF Commodore	1:18.8225
4	14	(Australia) Tim Slade	Brad Jones Racing	Holden VF Commodore	1:18.8982
5	23	(Australia) Michael Caruso	Nissan Motorsport	Nissan Altima L33	1:18.9365
6	33	(New Zealand) Scott McLaughlin	Garry Rogers Motorsport	Volvo S60	1:18.9440
7	15	(Australia) Rick Kelly	Nissan Motorsport	Nissan Altima L33	1:18.9924
8	88	(Australia) Jamie Whincup	Triple Eight Race Engineering	Holden VF Commodore	1:19.0386
9	19	(Australia) Will Davison	Tekno Autosports	Holden VF Commodore	1:19.1516
10	1	(Australia) Mark Winterbottom	Prodrive Racing Australia	Ford FG X Falcon	1:19.1549
11	6	(Australia) Cam Waters	Prodrive Racing Australia	Ford FG X Falcon	1:19.1560
12	97	(New Zealand) Shane van Gisbergen	Triple Eight Race Engineering	Holden VF Commodore	1:19.1586
13	17	(Australia) Scott Pye	DJR Team Penske	Ford FG X Falcon	1:19.1819
14	18	(Australia) Lee Holdsworth	Team 18	Holden VF Commodore	1:19.1899
15	111	(New Zealand) Chris Pither	Super Black Racing	Ford FG X Falcon	1:19.1950
16	21	(Australia) Tim Blanchard	Britek Motorsport	Holden VF Commodore	1:19.2150
17	9	(Australia) David Reynolds	Erebus Motorsport	Holden VF Commodore	1:19.2152
18	8	(Australia) Jason Bright	Brad Jones Racing	Holden VF Commodore	1:19.2371
19	2	(Australia) Garth Tander	Holden Racing Team	Holden VF Commodore	1:19.2963
20	22	(Australia) James Courtney	Holden Racing Team	Holden VF Commodore	1:19.3312
21	96	(Australia) Dale Wood	Nissan Motorsport	Nissan Altima L33	1:19.4252
22	7	(Australia) Todd Kelly	Nissan Motorsport	Nissan Altima L33	1:19.4410
23	34	(Australia) James Moffat	Garry Rogers Motorsport	Volvo S60	1:19.5526
24	3	(New Zealand) Andre Heimgartner	Lucas Dumbrell Motorsport	Holden VF Commodore	1:19.6145
25	222	(Australia) Nick Percat	Lucas Dumbrell Motorsport	Holden VF Commodore	1:19.7329
26	4	(Australia) Aaren Russell	Erebus Motorsport	Holden VF Commodore	1:19.7631

==== Race ====
Pos.	No.	Driver	Team	Car	Laps	Time/Retired	Grid	Points
1	14	(Australia) Tim Slade	Brad Jones Racing	Holden VF Commodore	67	1:33:49.3933	4	150
2	1	(Australia) Mark Winterbottom	Prodrive Racing Australia	Ford FG X Falcon	67	+6.7 s	10	138
3	12	(New Zealand) Fabian Coulthard	DJR Team Penske	Ford FG X Falcon	67	+7.4 s	2	129
4	97	(New Zealand) Shane van Gisbergen	Triple Eight Race Engineering	Holden VF Commodore	67	+14.1 s	12	120
5	6	(Australia) Cam Waters	Prodrive Racing Australia	Ford FG X Falcon	67	+18.1 s	11	111
6	9	(Australia) David Reynolds	Erebus Motorsport	Holden VF Commodore	67	+20.1 s	17	102
7	17	(Australia) Scott Pye	DJR Team Penske	Ford FG X Falcon	67	+21.5 s	13	96
8	888	(Australia) Craig Lowndes	Triple Eight Race Engineering	Holden VF Commodore	67	+23.8 s	3	90
9	88	(Australia) Jamie Whincup	Triple Eight Race Engineering	Holden VF Commodore	67	+25.9 s	8	84
10	23	(Australia) Michael Caruso	Nissan Motorsport	Nissan Altima L33	67	+30.2 s	5	78
11	33	(New Zealand) Scott McLaughlin	Garry Rogers Motorsport	Volvo S60	67	+31.6 s	6	72
12	2	(Australia) Garth Tander	Holden Racing Team	Holden VF Commodore	67	+32.1 s	19	69
13	7	(Australia) Todd Kelly	Nissan Motorsport	Nissan Altima L33	67	+35.6 s	22	66
14	96	(Australia) Dale Wood	Nissan Motorsport	Nissan Altima L33	67	+40.8 s	21	63
15	15	(Australia) Rick Kelly	Nissan Motorsport	Nissan Altima L33	67	+41.3 s	7	60
16	8	(Australia) Jason Bright	Brad Jones Racing	Holden VF Commodore	67	+42.0 s	18	57
17	19	(Australia) Will Davison	Tekno Autosports	Holden VF Commodore	67	+45.9 s	9	54
18	111	(New Zealand) Chris Pither	Super Black Racing	Ford FG X Falcon	67	+47.3 s	15	51
19	34	(Australia) James Moffat	Garry Rogers Motorsport	Volvo S60	67	+50.9 s	23	48
20	55	(Australia) Chaz Mostert	Rod Nash Racing	Ford FG X Falcon	67	+52.1 s	1	45
21	3	(New Zealand) Andre Heimgartner	Lucas Dumbrell Motorsport	Holden VF Commodore	67	+55.9 s	24	42
22	21	(Australia) Tim Blanchard	Britek Motorsport	Holden VF Commodore	64	+3 laps	16	39
23	222	(Australia) Nick Percat	Lucas Dumbrell Motorsport	Holden VF Commodore	60	+7 laps	25	36
24	4	(Australia) Aaren Russell	Erebus Motorsport	Holden VF Commodore	59	+8 laps	26	33
25	22	(Australia) James Courtney	Holden Racing Team	Holden VF Commodore	53	+14 laps	20	30
Ret	18	(Australia) Lee Holdsworth	Team 18	Holden VF Commodore	17	Gearbox	14	

== Championship standings after the event ==
- After Race 11 of 29. Only the top five positions are included for both sets of standings.

Drivers' Championship standings

	Pos.	Driver	Points
3	1	(Australia) Mark Winterbottom	1083
1	2	(New Zealand) Scott McLaughlin	1056
1	3	(Australia) Jamie Whincup	1047
3	4	(Australia) Craig Lowndes	1044
	5	(New Zealand) Shane van Gisbergen	997

Teams' Championship standings

	Pos.	Constructor	Points
	1	Triple Eight Race Engineering	2054
2	2	Prodrive Racing Australia	1711
	3	Garry Rogers Motorsport	1602
2	4	Holden Racing Team	1579
	5	Nissan Motorsport	1504
