= 2017 Auckland SuperSprint =

2017 New Zealand motor race

(New Zealand) 2017 ITM Auckland SuperSprint
Event Information
- Round 13 of 14 in the 2017 International V8 Supercars Championship
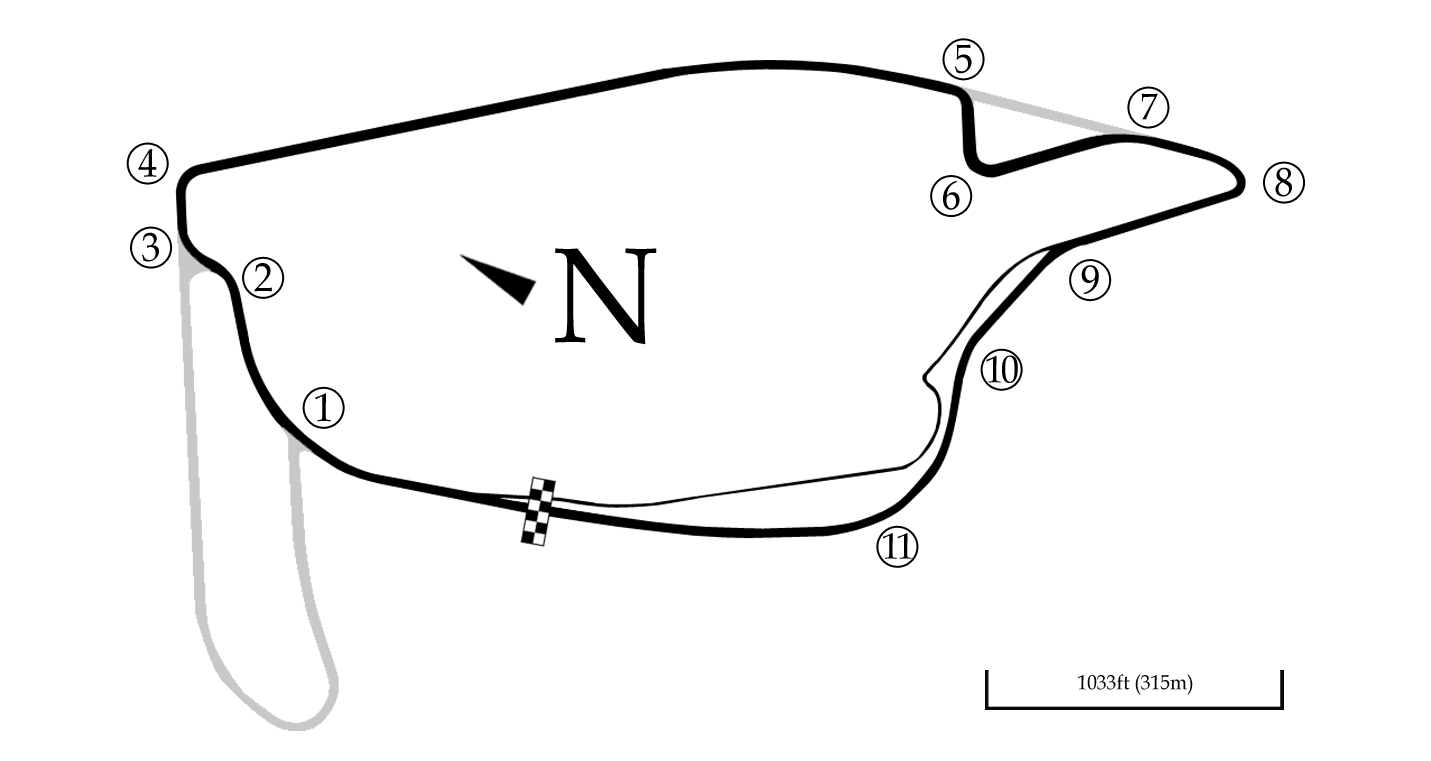
- Date: 3–5 November 2017
- Location: Pukekohe, New Zealand
- Venue: Pukekohe Park Raceway
- Weather: Friday: Fine; Saturday: Heavy Rain, Overcast; Sunday: Overcast

Results
Race 1
Distance	66 laps	192 km
Pole position	Cam Waters; Prodrive Racing Australia	
Winner	Shane van Gisbergen; Triple Eight Race Engineering	
Race 2
Distance	70 laps	200 km
Pole position	Jamie Whincup; Triple Eight Race Engineering	1:02.5148
Winner	Jamie Whincup; Triple Eight Race Engineering	

The 2017 ITM Auckland SuperSprint was a motor racing event for Supercars, held on the weekend of 3 to 5 November 2017. The event took place at Pukekohe Park Raceway near Pukekohe, New Zealand, and consisted of two races, 200 kilometres in length. It was the 13th event of fourteen in the 2017 Supercars Championship and hosted Races 23 and 24 of the season. It was the twelfth edition of the Auckland SuperSprint.

== Background ==
=== Driver changes ===
Alex Rullo was replaced at Lucas Dumbrell Motorsport with Jack Perkins.

== Report ==
=== Practice ===
Practice summary
Session	Day	Fastest lap				
Session	Day	No.	Driver	Team	Car	Time
Practice 1	Friday	17	(New Zealand) Scott McLaughlin	DJR Team Penske	Ford Falcon (FG X)	1:02.7153
Practice 2	Friday	6	(Australia) Cam Waters	Prodrive Racing Australia	Ford Falcon (FG X)	1:02.5623

=== Race 23 ===
==== Qualifying ====
Qualifying for Race 23 was abandoned due to torrential rain. Because of this, the grid was set as per the results of second practice, thereby giving Cam Waters pole position.

The following times were set in the second practice, which set the grid for Race 23.

Pos.	No.	Name	Team	Car	Time
1	6	(Australia) Cam Waters	Prodrive Racing Australia	Ford Falcon (FG X)	1:02.5623
2	88	(Australia) Jamie Whincup	Triple Eight Race Engineering	Holden Commodore (VF)	1:02.7037
3	5	(Australia) Mark Winterbottom	Prodrive Racing Australia	Ford Falcon (FG X)	1:02.7097
4	17	(New Zealand) Scott McLaughlin	DJR Team Penske	Ford Falcon (FG X)	1:02.7362
5	55	(Australia) Chaz Mostert	Rod Nash Racing	Ford Falcon (FG X)	1:02.8039
6	97	(New Zealand) Shane van Gisbergen	Triple Eight Race Engineering	Holden Commodore (VF)	1:02.8483
7	14	(Australia) Tim Slade	Brad Jones Racing	Holden Commodore (VF)	1:02.9435
8	9	(Australia) David Reynolds	Erebus Motorsport	Holden Commodore (VF)	1:03.0114
9	888	(Australia) Craig Lowndes	Triple Eight Race Engineering	Holden Commodore (VF)	1:03.0206
10	18	(Australia) Lee Holdsworth	Team 18	Holden Commodore (VF)	1:03.0234
11	56	(Australia) Jason Bright	Prodrive Racing Australia	Ford Falcon (FG X)	1:03.0407
12	15	(Australia) Rick Kelly	Nissan Motorsport	Nissan Altima (L33)	1:03.0565
13	22	(Australia) James Courtney	Walkinshaw Racing	Holden Commodore (VF)	1:03.0972
14	12	(New Zealand) Fabian Coulthard	DJR Team Penske	Ford Falcon (FG X)	1:03.1102
15	23	(Australia) Michael Caruso	Nissan Motorsport	Nissan Altima (L33)	1:03.1104
16	33	(Australia) Garth Tander	Garry Rogers Motorsport	Holden Commodore (VF)	1:03.1355
17	02	(Australia) Scott Pye	Walkinshaw Racing	Holden Commodore (VF)	1:03.1425
18	8	(Australia) Nick Percat	Brad Jones Racing	Holden Commodore (VF)	1:03.1452
19	34	(Australia) James Moffat	Garry Rogers Motorsport	Holden Commodore (VF)	1:03.2377
20	99	(Australia) Dale Wood	Erebus Motorsport	Holden Commodore (VF)	1:03.2631
21	19	(Australia) Will Davison	Tekno Autosports	Holden Commodore (VF)	1:03.2695
22	7	(Australia) Todd Kelly	Nissan Motorsport	Nissan Altima (L33)	1:03.5831
23	21	(Australia) Tim Blanchard	Tim Blanchard Racing	Holden Commodore (VF)	1:03.6268
24	78	(Switzerland) Simona de Silvestro	Nissan Motorsport	Nissan Altima (L33)	1:03.7813
25	3	(Australia) Aaren Russell	Lucas Dumbrell Motorsport	Holden Commodore (VF)	1:03.7876
26	62	(Australia) Jack Perkins	Lucas Dumbrell Motorsport	Holden Commodore (VF)	1:04.1665

==== Race ====
Pos	No.	Driver	Team	Laps	Time / Retired	Grid	Points
1	97	(New Zealand) Shane van Gisbergen	Triple Eight Race Engineering	66	1hr 23min 58.8114sec	6	150
2	5	(Australia) Mark Winterbottom	Prodrive Racing Australia	66	+ 0.817	3	138
3	17	(New Zealand) Scott McLaughlin	DJR Team Penske	66	+ 1.425	4	129
4	88	(Australia) Jamie Whincup	Triple Eight Race Engineering	66	+ 1.880	2	120
5	56	(Australia) Jason Bright	Britek Motorsport	66	+ 2.553	12	111
6	14	(Australia) Tim Slade	Brad Jones Racing	66	+ 3.160	8	102
7	33	(Australia) Garth Tander	Garry Rogers Motorsport	66	+ 3.951	16	96
8	888	(Australia) Craig Lowndes	Triple Eight Race Engineering	66	+ 4.315	10	90
9	6	(Australia) Cam Waters	Prodrive Racing Australia	66	+ 4.758	1	84
10	18	(Australia) Lee Holdsworth	Team 18	66	+ 5.280	11	78
11	15	(Australia) Rick Kelly	Nissan Motorsport	66	+ 6.474	13	72
12	19	(Australia) Will Davison	Tekno Autosports	66	+ 6.756	21	69
13	34	(Australia) James Moffat	Garry Rogers Motorsport	66	+ 7.497	19	66
14	02	(Australia) Scott Pye	Walkinshaw Racing	66	+ 8.074	17	63
15	7	(Australia) Todd Kelly	Nissan Motorsport	66	+ 8.519	22	60
16	8	(Australia) Nick Percat	Brad Jones Racing	66	+ 9.381	18	57
17	23	(Australia) Michael Caruso	Nissan Motorsport	66	+ 9.942	15	54
18	78	(Switzerland) Simona de Silvestro	Nissan Motorsport	66	+ 10.284	24	51
19	21	(Australia) Tim Blanchard	Tim Blanchard Racing	66	+ 10.855	23	48
20	99	(Australia) Dale Wood	Erebus Motorsport	66	+ 12.804	20	45
21	3	(Australia) Aaren Russell	Lucas Dumbrell Motorsport	66	+ 13.771	25	42
22	62	(Australia) Jack Perkins	Lucas Dumbrell Motorsport	66	+ 14.053	26	39
23	55	(Australia) Chaz Mostert	Rod Nash Racing	66	+ 50.241	5	36
24	9	(Australia) David Reynolds	Erebus Motorsport	63	+ 3 laps	9	33
25	22	(Australia) James Courtney	Walkinshaw Racing	63	+ 3 laps	14	30
DNF	12	(New Zealand) Fabian Coulthard	DJR Team Penske	56	Accident	7	

=== Race 24 ===
==== Qualifying ====
Pos.	No.	Name	Team	Car	Time
1	88	(Australia) Jamie Whincup	Triple Eight Race Engineering	Holden Commodore (VF)	1:02.515
2	17	(New Zealand) Scott McLaughlin	DJR Team Penske	Ford Falcon (FG X)	1:02.520
3	55	(Australia) Chaz Mostert	Rod Nash Racing	Ford Falcon (FG X)	1:02.536
4	5	(Australia) Mark Winterbottom	Prodrive Racing Australia	Ford Falcon (FG X)	1:02.572
5	6	(Australia) Cam Waters	Prodrive Racing Australia	Ford Falcon (FG X)	1:02.631
6	14	(Australia) Tim Slade	Brad Jones Racing	Holden Commodore (VF)	1:02.738
7	97	(New Zealand) Shane van Gisbergen	Triple Eight Race Engineering	Holden Commodore (VF)	1:02.777
8	12	(New Zealand) Fabian Coulthard	DJR Team Penske	Ford Falcon (FG X)	1:02.833
9	34	(Australia) James Moffat	Garry Rogers Motorsport	Holden Commodore (VF)	1:02.861
10	9	(Australia) David Reynolds	Erebus Motorsport	Holden Commodore (VF)	1:02.894
11	33	(Australia) Garth Tander	Garry Rogers Motorsport	Holden Commodore (VF)	1:02.909
12	888	(Australia) Craig Lowndes	Triple Eight Race Engineering	Holden Commodore (VF)	1:02.940
13	23	(Australia) Michael Caruso	Nissan Motorsport	Nissan Altima (L33)	1:02.941
14	18	(Australia) Lee Holdsworth	Team 18	Holden Commodore (VF)	1:02.965
15	8	(Australia) Nick Percat	Brad Jones Racing	Holden Commodore (VF)	1:02.971
16	15	(Australia) Rick Kelly	Nissan Motorsport	Nissan Altima (L33)	1:02.972
17	19	(Australia) Will Davison	Tekno Autosports	Holden Commodore (VF)	1:02.997
18	56	(Australia) Jason Bright	Britek Motorsport	Ford Falcon (FG X)	1:03.018
19	02	(Australia) Scott Pye	Walkinshaw Racing	Holden Commodore (VF)	1:03.022
20	22	(Australia) James Courtney	Walkinshaw Racing	Holden Commodore (VF)	1:03.066
21	7	(Australia) Todd Kelly	Nissan Motorsport	Nissan Altima (L33)	1:03.105
22	99	(Australia) Dale Wood	Erebus Motorsport	Holden Commodore (VF)	1:03.369
23	78	(Switzerland) Simona de Silvestro	Nissan Motorsport	Nissan Altima (L33)	1:03.423
24	21	(Australia) Tim Blanchard	Tim Blanchard Racing	Holden Commodore (VF)	1:03.542
25	62	(Australia) Jack Perkins	Lucas Dumbrell Motorsport	Holden Commodore (VF)	1:03.655
26	3	(Australia) Aaren Russell	Lucas Dumbrell Motorsport	Holden Commodore (VF)	1:03.988

==== Race ====
Pos	No.	Driver	Team	Laps	Time / Retired	Grid	Points
1	88	(Australia) Jamie Whincup	Triple Eight Race Engineering	70	1hr 17min 11.7118sec	1	150
2	17	(New Zealand) Scott McLaughlin	DJR Team Penske	70	+ 5.906	2	138
3	6	(Australia) Cam Waters	Prodrive Racing Australia	70	+ 8.660	5	129
4	888	(Australia) Craig Lowndes	Triple Eight Race Engineering	70	+ 18.790	12	120
5	12	(New Zealand) Fabian Coulthard	DJR Team Penske	70	+ 25.606	8	111
6	33	(Australia) Garth Tander	Garry Rogers Motorsport	70	+ 29.498	11	102
7	55	(Australia) Chaz Mostert	Rod Nash Racing	70	+ 31.902	3	96
8	56	(Australia) Jason Bright	Britek Motorsport	70	+ 32.379	18	90
9	34	(Australia) James Moffat	Garry Rogers Motorsport	70	+ 38.333	9	84
10	02	(Australia) Scott Pye	Walkinshaw Racing	70	+ 39.309	19	78
11	23	(Australia) Michael Caruso	Nissan Motorsport	70	+ 39.582	13	72
12	15	(Australia) Rick Kelly	Nissan Motorsport	70	+ 43.989	16	69
13	9	(Australia) David Reynolds	Erebus Motorsport	70	+ 44.355	10	66
14	8	(Australia) Nick Percat	Brad Jones Racing	70	+ 47.216	15	63
15	14	(Australia) Tim Slade	Brad Jones Racing	70	+ 59.043	6	60
16	21	(Australia) Tim Blanchard	Tim Blanchard Racing	70	+ 59.511	24	57
17	78	(Switzerland) Simona de Silvestro	Nissan Motorsport	70	+ 59.861	23	54
18	7	(Australia) Todd Kelly	Nissan Motorsport	69	+ 1 lap	21	51
19	5	(Australia) Mark Winterbottom	Prodrive Racing Australia	69	+ 1 lap	4	48
20	99	(Australia) Dale Wood	Erebus Motorsport	69	+ 1 lap	22	45
21	3	(Australia) Aaren Russell	Lucas Dumbrell Motorsport	69	+ 1 lap	26	42
22	62	(Australia) Jack Perkins	Lucas Dumbrell Motorsport	68	+ 2 laps	25	39
23	19	(Australia) Will Davison	Tekno Autosports	67	+ 3 laps	17	36
24	97	(Australia) Shane van Gisbergen	Triple Eight Race Engineering	56	+ 14 laps	7	33
DNF	22	(Australia) James Courtney	Walkinshaw Racing	5	Accident damage	20	
DNF	18	(Australia) Lee Holdsworth	Team 18	1	Accident damage	14	
