= 2016 Perth SuperSprint =

2016 V8 Supercar championship race

(Western Australia) 2016 Perth SuperSprint
Event Information
- Round 4 of 14 in the 2016 International V8 Supercars Championship
- Date: 6–8 May 2016
- Location: Wanneroo, Western Australia
- Venue: Barbagallo Raceway
- Weather: Friday: rain Saturday: rain Sunday: fine

Results
Race 1
Distance	50 laps	120 km
Pole position	Cam Waters; Prodrive Racing Australia	59.6256
Winner	Craig Lowndes; Triple Eight Race Engineering	51:03.2882
Race 2
Distance	83 laps	200 km
Pole position	Chaz Mostert; Rod Nash Racing	55.0538
Winner	Mark Winterbottom; Prodrive Racing Australia	1:22:22.8550

The 2016 Perth SuperSprint was a motor racing event for V8 Supercars, held on the weekend of 6 to 8 May 2016. The event was held at Barbagallo Raceway at Wanneroo, Western Australia, and consisted of one race of 120 kilometres and one race of 200 km in length. It was the fourth event of fourteen in the 2016 International V8 Supercars Championship and hosted Races 8 and 9 of the season. The event was the 39th running of the Perth SuperSprint.

Cam Waters took his first championship pole position in a rain-affected qualifying session for Race 8. The race was won by Craig Lowndes, who took advantage of younger tyres, courtesy of a two-pit stop strategy, to take the lead from his teammates Shane van Gisbergen and Jamie Whincup in the closing stages. After a difficult Race 8, where he went off the circuit and was later spun, Mark Winterbottom took victory in Race 9 ahead of Scott McLaughlin and Lowndes. After finishing eleventh in Race 9, Whincup lost the championship lead to Lowndes.

== Report ==
=== Background ===
On 27 April, it was announced that the series would be rebranded as the Virgin Australia Supercars Championship from 1 July 2016, with Virgin Australia becoming the primary sponsor of the category. On 4 May, Volvo, along with its performance arm Polestar, announced that it would withdraw its support of Garry Rogers Motorsport at the end of the 2016 season. The team stated plans to continue using its Volvo S60s in 2017, though this was cast into doubt when Cyan Racing, Polestar's motorsport partner, announced that the cars would be recalled to Sweden.

Jamie Whincup entered the event as the championship leader ahead of Scott McLaughlin, who had won both races at the previous event, and defending series champion Mark Winterbottom.

=== Practice ===
Two one-hour practice sessions were held on Friday afternoon, both of which were open to Enduro Cup co-drivers. Tony D'Alberto, Dean Fiore, Karl Reindler, David Russell and Luke Youlden completed laps in the first session, while Reindler also drove in the second session. The first session started under wet conditions, with all drivers using wet tyres. The session was stopped after eight minutes when David Reynolds got stuck in the sand trap at Turn 6. The circuit gradually dried out and drivers began changing to slick tyres after 15 minutes. McLaughlin set the fastest time of 56.4211 ahead of Chaz Mostert and Tim Slade.

The second session was also held in mixed conditions, with drivers again starting on wet tyres before changing to slick tyres later in the session. A number of drivers elected not to run early in the session due to the conditions. Whincup's car had an electrical issue with ten minutes remaining; his team was able to repair the car and he returned to the circuit. James Courtney set a time of 55.9297 with five minutes left in the session before rain hit again, preventing any improvement from other drivers.

A third practice session was held on Saturday morning and was 15 minutes in duration. The session was wet throughout, with the fastest time being 1:03.3112, set by Winterbottom. James Moffat's car lost oil pressure, ending his session and forcing his team to attempt to change the engine prior to the qualifying session, which started 50 minutes after the end of the practice session.

Practice summary
Session	Day	Fastest lap				
Session	Day	No.	Driver	Team	Car	Time
Practice 1	Friday	33	(New Zealand) Scott McLaughlin	Garry Rogers Motorsport	Volvo S60	56.4211
Practice 2	Friday	22	(Australia) James Courtney	Holden Racing Team	Holden VF Commodore	55.9297
Practice 3	Saturday	1	(Australia) Mark Winterbottom	Prodrive Racing Australia	Ford FG X Falcon	1:03.3112

=== Qualifying – Race 8 ===
Qualifying for Race 8 took place on Saturday afternoon and consisted of a single 15-minute session. While drivers started the session with slick tyres, rain began to fall soon after the session commenced. Michael Caruso got stuck in the sand trap at the first corner of his first flying lap, which caused a red flag and resulted in his exclusion from the rest of the session. The red flag was not displayed immediately, however, and several drivers were able to complete a timed lap, with the fastest being Cam Waters ahead of Mostert and Craig Lowndes. The session was restarted after Caruso's car had been extracted, though only those drivers who had failed to set a time prior to the red flag being shown returned to the circuit. With the track now completely wet, the fastest of this group of drivers, Fabian Coulthard, qualified only twelfth, over four seconds slower than Waters' time of 59.6256. The session was stopped for a second time when Reynolds got stuck in the sand trap at Turn 1. With conditions not improving, Waters claimed his first pole position in the championship.

=== Race 8 ===
Race 8 took place on Saturday afternoon and started in wet conditions, with all drivers electing to start the race on wet tyres. Shane van Gisbergen, who had started fourth, took the lead from Waters on lap 2. With the track drying out, Scott Pye pitted after nine laps to change to slick tyres. The leaders began doing the same on lap 11, with Van Gisbergen emerging in front of Mostert, Waters, Lowndes and Whincup. Coulthard was given a drive-through penalty for an unsafe pit release by his team. On lap 21, Winterbottom went off the circuit at the final corner, dropping from tenth to 17th place. He made a second pit stop on lap 27, but was turned around by Dale Wood as he slowed for the pit lane entry.

On lap 28, Lowndes pitted from fourth place to fit fresh tyres; he would be the only one of the front-runners to switch to a two-stop strategy. Having dropped to 20th place, Lowndes quickly made his way up the order as other drivers struggled in cars with older tyres. He passed Van Gisbergen for the lead on lap 47 and went on to take victory by just under six seconds, surviving a late rain shower which crossed the circuit on the penultimate lap. Van Gisbergen finished second ahead of Whincup, while Will Davison, Garth Tander and Courtney utilised good tyre life to take fourth, fifth and sixth respectively. Todd Kelly finished seventh and was the first driver after Lowndes to use a two-stop strategy, while Chris Pither achieved his best result of the season by finishing eighth. Mostert and Waters had poor tyre life and dropped to twelfth and 13th by the end of the race, while Pye was given a 40-second time penalty for shortcutting the circuit, dropping him from eleventh to 24th.

=== Qualifying – Race 9 ===
Qualifying for Race 9 was a single 20-minute session held on Sunday morning. Mostert took pole position with a time of 55.0538, ahead of Lowndes, Winterbottom and Pither, who achieved his best qualifying position of the season.

=== Race 9 ===
Race 9 was held on Sunday afternoon and the race regulations required each car to take on at least 120 litres of fuel during the race. Teams and drivers employed differing pit stop strategies during the race, with some opting for a two-stop strategy and others for a three-stop strategy, due to high tyre degradation. Lowndes took the lead from Mostert at the start and led until his first of three pit stops on lap 14. Lowndes' teammate Whincup had been the first to make a pit stop, coming in on lap 10. Winterbottom and McLaughlin, both on two-stop strategies, led until their respective pit stops on laps 27 and 28.

Drivers on a three-stop strategy began making their second pit stops on lap 34, with Todd Kelly pitting from 15th place. Whincup pitted one lap later, while race leader Lowndes stopped on lap 38. Winterbottom obtained the lead when Tander pitted on lap 43 before making his second and final pit stop on lap 53, giving him a 30-lap final stint. McLaughlin ran longer in the middle stint, not making his second stop until lap 60. Rick Kelly also stopped on lap 60 and would emerge second of the drivers on a three-stop strategy after Lowndes and Van Gisbergen completed their third pit stops on lap 61. Once every driver had completed their pit stops, Winterbottom led McLaughlin by nearly 15 seconds, with Lowndes in third and Van Gisbergen in fourth after he passed Rick Kelly.

With younger tyres, McLaughlin, Lowndes and Van Gisbergen began closing the gap to Winterbottom. With his lead reduced to around two seconds, Winterbottom lost more time when Aaren Russell unlapped himself with five laps remaining. McLaughlin continued to close in and looked up the inside of Winterbottom at the final corner on lap 82, but compromised his exit from the corner and he was forced to defend from Lowndes going into Turn 1. This gave Winterbottom a small lead which he was able to maintain on the final lap, taking victory over McLaughlin by 0.3 seconds. Lowndes finished third to take the championship lead, with Van Gisbergen and Rick Kelly completed the top five, all within two seconds of Winterbottom. Winterbottom was critical of Russell following the race, saying: "I thought Aaren Russell ruined my race there, it cost two seconds, I thought it was over."

== Results ==
=== Race 8 ===
==== Qualifying ====
Pos.	No.	Driver	Team	Car	Time
1	6	(Australia) Cam Waters	Prodrive Racing Australia	Ford FG X Falcon	59.6256
2	55	(Australia) Chaz Mostert	Rod Nash Racing	Ford FG X Falcon	59.8877
3	888	(Australia) Craig Lowndes	Triple Eight Race Engineering	Holden VF Commodore	59.9643
4	97	(New Zealand) Shane van Gisbergen	Triple Eight Race Engineering	Holden VF Commodore	1:00.0021
5	1	(Australia) Mark Winterbottom	Prodrive Racing Australia	Ford FG X Falcon	1:00.0960
6	88	(Australia) Jamie Whincup	Triple Eight Race Engineering	Holden VF Commodore	1:00.3752
7	22	(Australia) James Courtney	Holden Racing Team	Holden VF Commodore	1:00.5442
8	111	(New Zealand) Chris Pither	Super Black Racing	Ford FG X Falcon	1:00.5452
9	19	(Australia) Will Davison	Tekno Autosports	Holden VF Commodore	1:00.8995
10	2	(Australia) Garth Tander	Holden Racing Team	Holden VF Commodore	1:00.9103
11	14	(Australia) Tim Slade	Brad Jones Racing	Holden VF Commodore	1:01.6348
12	12	(New Zealand) Fabian Coulthard	DJR Team Penske	Ford FG X Falcon	1:03.7822
13	7	(Australia) Todd Kelly	Nissan Motorsport	Nissan Altima L33	1:04.2603
14	15	(Australia) Rick Kelly	Nissan Motorsport	Nissan Altima L33	1:04.2731
15	33	(New Zealand) Scott McLaughlin	Garry Rogers Motorsport	Volvo S60	1:04.3182
16	96	(Australia) Dale Wood	Nissan Motorsport	Nissan Altima L33	1:04.3416
17	18	(Australia) Lee Holdsworth	Team 18	Holden VF Commodore	1:04.5489
18	9	(Australia) David Reynolds	Erebus Motorsport	Holden VF Commodore	1:04.5766
19	8	(Australia) Jason Bright	Brad Jones Racing	Holden VF Commodore	1:04.7046
20	222	(Australia) Nick Percat	Lucas Dumbrell Motorsport	Holden VF Commodore	1:04.7140
21	17	(Australia) Scott Pye	DJR Team Penske	Ford FG X Falcon	1:04.8278
22	4	(Australia) Aaren Russell	Erebus Motorsport	Holden VF Commodore	1:04.8372
23	3	(New Zealand) Andre Heimgartner	Lucas Dumbrell Motorsport	Holden VF Commodore	1:05.0330
24	34	(Australia) James Moffat	Garry Rogers Motorsport	Volvo S60	1:05.2931
25	21	(Australia) Tim Blanchard	Britek Motorsport	Holden VF Commodore	1:05.3330
–	23	(Australia) Michael Caruso	Nissan Motorsport	Nissan Altima L33	No time

==== Race ====
Pos.	No.	Driver	Team	Car	Laps	Time/Retired	Grid	Points
1	888	(Australia) Craig Lowndes	Triple Eight Race Engineering	Holden VF Commodore	50	51:03.2882	3	150
2	97	(New Zealand) Shane van Gisbergen	Triple Eight Race Engineering	Holden VF Commodore	50	+5.9 s	4	138
3	88	(Australia) Jamie Whincup	Triple Eight Race Engineering	Holden VF Commodore	50	+6.6 s	6	129
4	19	(Australia) Will Davison	Tekno Autosports	Holden VF Commodore	50	+7.4 s	9	120
5	2	(Australia) Garth Tander	Holden Racing Team	Holden VF Commodore	50	+9.9 s	10	111
6	22	(Australia) James Courtney	Holden Racing Team	Holden VF Commodore	50	+15.1 s	7	102
7	7	(Australia) Todd Kelly	Nissan Motorsport	Nissan Altima L33	50	+15.7 s	13	96
8	111	(New Zealand) Chris Pither	Super Black Racing	Ford FG X Falcon	50	+17.2 s	8	90
9	15	(Australia) Rick Kelly	Nissan Motorsport	Nissan Altima L33	50	+18.0 s	14	84
10	14	(Australia) Tim Slade	Brad Jones Racing	Holden VF Commodore	50	+19.9 s	11	78
11	33	(New Zealand) Scott McLaughlin	Garry Rogers Motorsport	Volvo S60	50	+21.1 s	15	72
12	55	(Australia) Chaz Mostert	Rod Nash Racing	Ford FG X Falcon	50	+24.3 s	2	69
13	6	(Australia) Cam Waters	Prodrive Racing Australia	Ford FG X Falcon	50	+25.0 s	1	66
14	34	(Australia) James Moffat	Garry Rogers Motorsport	Volvo S60	50	+26.2 s	24	63
15	18	(Australia) Lee Holdsworth	Team 18	Holden VF Commodore	50	+26.7 s	17	60
16	8	(Australia) Jason Bright	Brad Jones Racing	Holden VF Commodore	50	+30.2 s	19	57
17	12	(New Zealand) Fabian Coulthard	DJR Team Penske	Ford FG X Falcon	50	+32.5 s	12	54
18	96	(Australia) Dale Wood	Nissan Motorsport	Nissan Altima L33	50	+38.8 s	16	51
19	9	(Australia) David Reynolds	Erebus Motorsport	Holden VF Commodore	50	+39.0 s	18	48
20	222	(Australia) Nick Percat	Lucas Dumbrell Motorsport	Holden VF Commodore	50	+45.4 s	20	45
21	3	(New Zealand) Andre Heimgartner	Lucas Dumbrell Motorsport	Holden VF Commodore	50	+47.6 s	23	33
22	1	(Australia) Mark Winterbottom	Prodrive Racing Australia	Ford FG X Falcon	50	+55.0 s	5	39
23	21	(Australia) Tim Blanchard	Britek Motorsport	Holden VF Commodore	50	+59.9 s	25	36
24	17	(Australia) Scott Pye	DJR Team Penske	Ford FG X Falcon	50	+1:00.6 (Note: 40-second time penalty for short-cutting the circuit.)	21	33
25	4	(Australia) Aaren Russell	Erebus Motorsport	Holden VF Commodore	49	+1 lap	22	30
26	23	(Australia) Michael Caruso	Nissan Motorsport	Nissan Altima L33	43	+7 laps	26	27

=== Race 9 ===
==== Qualifying ====
Pos.	No.	Driver	Team	Car	Time
1	55	(Australia) Chaz Mostert	Rod Nash Racing	Ford FG X Falcon	55.0538
2	888	(Australia) Craig Lowndes	Triple Eight Race Engineering	Holden VF Commodore	55.1235
3	1	(Australia) Mark Winterbottom	Prodrive Racing Australia	Ford FG X Falcon	55.1393
4	111	(New Zealand) Chris Pither	Super Black Racing	Ford FG X Falcon	55.1510
5	12	(New Zealand) Fabian Coulthard	DJR Team Penske	Ford FG X Falcon	55.1749
6	97	(New Zealand) Shane van Gisbergen	Triple Eight Race Engineering	Holden VF Commodore	55.1925
7	15	(Australia) Rick Kelly	Nissan Motorsport	Nissan Altima L33	55.2437
8	88	(Australia) Jamie Whincup	Triple Eight Race Engineering	Holden VF Commodore	55.2558
9	33	(New Zealand) Scott McLaughlin	Garry Rogers Motorsport	Volvo S60	55.3385
10	2	(Australia) Garth Tander	Holden Racing Team	Holden VF Commodore	55.3447
11	19	(Australia) Will Davison	Tekno Autosports	Holden VF Commodore	55.3881
12	18	(Australia) Lee Holdsworth	Team 18	Holden VF Commodore	55.3965
13	96	(Australia) Dale Wood	Nissan Motorsport	Nissan Altima L33	55.4039
14	6	(Australia) Cam Waters	Prodrive Racing Australia	Ford FG X Falcon	55.4066
15	14	(Australia) Tim Slade	Brad Jones Racing	Holden VF Commodore	55.4455
16	22	(Australia) James Courtney	Holden Racing Team	Holden VF Commodore	55.4558
17	21	(Australia) Tim Blanchard	Britek Motorsport	Holden VF Commodore	55.4702
18	17	(Australia) Scott Pye	DJR Team Penske	Ford FG X Falcon	55.4743
19	8	(Australia) Jason Bright	Brad Jones Racing	Holden VF Commodore	55.4927
20	34	(Australia) James Moffat	Garry Rogers Motorsport	Volvo S60	55.5197
21	7	(Australia) Todd Kelly	Nissan Motorsport	Nissan Altima L33	55.5509
22	23	(Australia) Michael Caruso	Nissan Motorsport	Nissan Altima L33	55.6178
23	9	(Australia) David Reynolds	Erebus Motorsport	Holden VF Commodore	55.6456
24	3	(New Zealand) Andre Heimgartner	Lucas Dumbrell Motorsport	Holden VF Commodore	55.6756
25	222	(Australia) Nick Percat	Lucas Dumbrell Motorsport	Holden VF Commodore	55.6817
26	4	(Australia) Aaren Russell	Erebus Motorsport	Holden VF Commodore	56.0502

==== Race ====
Pos.	No.	Driver	Team	Car	Laps	Time/Retired	Grid	Points
1	1	(Australia) Mark Winterbottom	Prodrive Racing Australia	Ford FG X Falcon	83	1:22:22.8550	3	150
2	33	(New Zealand) Scott McLaughlin	Garry Rogers Motorsport	Volvo S60	83	+0.3 s	9	138
3	888	(Australia) Craig Lowndes	Triple Eight Race Engineering	Holden VF Commodore	83	+0.8 s	2	129
4	97	(New Zealand) Shane van Gisbergen	Triple Eight Race Engineering	Holden VF Commodore	83	+1.4 s	6	120
5	15	(Australia) Rick Kelly	Nissan Motorsport	Nissan Altima L33	83	+1.7 s	7	111
6	55	(Australia) Chaz Mostert	Rod Nash Racing	Ford FG X Falcon	83	+5.2 s	1	102
7	2	(Australia) Garth Tander	Holden Racing Team	Holden VF Commodore	83	+5.4 s	10	96
8	22	(Australia) James Courtney	Holden Racing Team	Holden VF Commodore	83	+6.5 s	16	90
9	23	(Australia) Michael Caruso	Nissan Motorsport	Nissan Altima L33	83	+7.1 s	22	84
10	19	(Australia) Will Davison	Tekno Autosports	Holden VF Commodore	83	+9.8 s	11	78
11	88	(Australia) Jamie Whincup	Triple Eight Race Engineering	Holden VF Commodore	83	+18.1 s	8	72
12	18	(Australia) Lee Holdsworth	Team 18	Holden VF Commodore	83	+18.4 s	12	69
13	8	(Australia) Jason Bright	Brad Jones Racing	Holden VF Commodore	83	+23.2 s	19	66
14	111	(New Zealand) Chris Pither	Super Black Racing	Ford FG X Falcon	83	+23.8 s	4	63
15	12	(New Zealand) Fabian Coulthard	DJR Team Penske	Ford FG X Falcon	83	+25.7 s	5	60
16	14	(Australia) Tim Slade	Brad Jones Racing	Holden VF Commodore	83	+27.6 s	15	57
17	34	(Australia) James Moffat	Garry Rogers Motorsport	Volvo S60	83	+30.1 s	20	54
18	222	(Australia) Nick Percat	Lucas Dumbrell Motorsport	Holden VF Commodore	83	+37.6 s	25	51
19	17	(Australia) Scott Pye	DJR Team Penske	Ford FG X Falcon	83	+39.4 s	18	48
20	96	(Australia) Dale Wood	Nissan Motorsport	Nissan Altima L33	83	+42.9 s	13	45
21	9	(Australia) David Reynolds	Erebus Motorsport	Holden VF Commodore	83	+43.9 s	23	42
22	21	(Australia) Tim Blanchard	Britek Motorsport	Holden VF Commodore	83	+44.6 s	17	39
23	7	(Australia) Todd Kelly	Nissan Motorsport	Nissan Altima L33	83	+46.0 s	21	36
24	4	(Australia) Aaren Russell	Erebus Motorsport	Holden VF Commodore	83	+58.9 s	26	33
25	3	(New Zealand) Andre Heimgartner	Lucas Dumbrell Motorsport	Holden VF Commodore	82	+1 lap	24	30
26	6	(Australia) Cam Waters	Prodrive Racing Australia	Ford FG X Falcon	82	+1 lap	14	27

== Championship standings after the event ==
- After Race 9 of 29. Only the top five positions are included for both sets of standings.

Drivers' Championship standings

	Pos.	Driver	Points
3	1	(Australia) Craig Lowndes	894
1	2	(Australia) Jamie Whincup	852
1	3	(New Zealand) Scott McLaughlin	846
1	4	(Australia) Mark Winterbottom	816
1	5	(New Zealand) Shane van Gisbergen	803

Teams' Championship standings

	Pos.	Constructor	Points
	1	Triple Eight Race Engineering	1655
	2	Holden Racing Team	1402
1	3	Garry Rogers Motorsport	1317
1	4	Prodrive Racing Australia	1276
	5	Nissan Motorsport	1192
