= 2016 Phillip Island SuperSprint =

2016 V8 Supercar championship race

(Victoria (state)) 2016 WD-40 Phillip Island SuperSprint
Event Information
- Round 3 of 14 in the 2016 International V8 Supercars Championship
- Date: 15–17 April 2016
- Location: Phillip Island, Victoria
- Venue: Phillip Island Grand Prix Circuit
- Weather: Friday: fine Saturday: overcast Sunday: fine

Results
Race 1
| Distance | 27 laps | 120 km |
| Pole position | Scott McLaughlin; Garry Rogers Motorsport | 1:30.4880 |
| Winner | Scott McLaughlin; Garry Rogers Motorsport | 42:39.8093 |
Race 2
| Distance | 45 laps | 200 km |
| Pole position | Scott McLaughlin; Garry Rogers Motorsport | 1:30.7018 |
| Winner | Scott McLaughlin; Garry Rogers Motorsport | 1:17:33.4257 |

The 2016 WD-40 Phillip Island SuperSprint was a motor racing event for V8 Supercars, held on the weekend of 15 to 17 April 2016. The event was held at the Phillip Island Grand Prix Circuit at Phillip Island, Victoria, and consisted of one race of 120 kilometres and one race of 200 km in length. It was the third event of fourteen in the 2016 International V8 Supercars Championship and hosted Races 6 and 7 of the season. The event was the 18th running of the Phillip Island SuperSprint and was the 500th event in the combined history of the Australian Touring Car Championship and V8 Supercars.

The event was dominated by Scott McLaughlin, who won both races from pole position. Second place was taken by Jamie Whincup in Race 6, a result which also saw him take the championship lead, while Mark Winterbottom finished second in Race 7. DJR Team Penske enjoyed a strong weekend, with Fabian Coulthard and Scott Pye finishing third in Races 6 and 7 respectively.

== Report ==
=== Background ===
The Holden Racing Team ran a one-off tribute livery on its cars to raise awareness for the ANZAC appeal. A new rule was introduced for the event, preventing teams from changing brake rotors and pads between qualifying and each race.

Will Davison entered the event as the championship leader ahead of Craig Lowndes and Jamie Whincup.

=== Practice ===
Two one-hour practice sessions were held on Friday afternoon. Enduro Cup co-drivers were permitted to take part in the first session and Tony D'Alberto, Dean Fiore, Macauley Jones and Luke Youlden all completed laps. The session was topped by Lowndes, who set a time of 1:31.7255. Garth Tander was second fastest ahead of Whincup, who ran off the road at Turn 2 during the session. Scott McLaughlin set a new practice lap record of 1:30.3918 to go quickest in the second session. His time was six tenths of a second faster than that of second-placed Fabian Coulthard. Several drivers went off the circuit at Turns 1 and 2 during the session.

A 15-minute session was held on Saturday morning. Mark Winterbottom set the fastest time early in the session, with a light rain shower preventing drivers from improving their times at the end of the session.

Practice summary
| Session | Day | Fastest lap | | | | |
| Session | Day | No. | Driver | Team | Car | Time |
|---|---|---|---|---|---|---|
| Practice 1 | Friday | 888 | (Australia) Craig Lowndes | Triple Eight Race Engineering | Holden VF Commodore | 1:31.7255 |
| Practice 2 | Friday | 33 | (New Zealand) Scott McLaughlin | Garry Rogers Motorsport | Volvo S60 | 1:30.3918 |
| Practice 3 | Saturday | 1 | (Australia) Mark Winterbottom | Prodrive Racing Australia | Ford FG X Falcon | 1:31.3178 |

=== Qualifying – Race 6 ===
Qualifying for Race 6 took place on Saturday afternoon and was 15 minutes in duration. McLaughlin took his first pole position of the season, setting a time of 1:30.4880. Chaz Mostert was second fastest ahead of Winterbottom, Whincup and Shane van Gisbergen.

=== Race 6 ===
Race 6 was held on Saturday afternoon. McLaughlin and Mostert maintained their positions at the start while Whincup moved into third place ahead of Winterbottom. Drivers began making their compulsory pit stops at the end of lap 4, with Winterbottom, Van Gisbergen, Lowndes, Scott Pye and Michael Caruso pitting at this time. Mostert made his pit stop one lap later, while McLaughlin and Whincup pitted on the following two laps. McLaughlin emerged as effective leader, being the best-placed driver to have made a pit stop, ahead of Whincup and Mostert. Brad Jones Racing mimicked the strategy it had used at Symmons Plains, running its drivers Jason Bright and Tim Slade to laps 16 and 17 before performing their pit stops. They came out of the pit lane in 16th and tenth places respectively but were able to move forward in the closing stages due to their fresher tyres.

While running in eighth place on lap 24, Pye suffered a tyre failure going into the first corner. He went off the circuit and spun before driving back to the pit lane to change the affected wheel, leaving him in last place. Mostert also suffered a puncture on the final lap, dropping him from third to 23rd. McLaughlin took victory, 1.2 seconds clear of Whincup, while Coulthard finished third after making up multiple positions following his pit stop. James Moffat scored his best result of the season with seventh, while Slade and Bright made it to eighth and tenth places respectively. With Davison finishing in 16th place, Whincup assumed the lead in the championship.

=== Qualifying – Race 7 ===
Qualifying for Race 7 was a 20-minute session held on Sunday morning. McLaughlin again took pole position, followed by Whincup, Winterbottom, Coulthard and Moffat. Whincup and Caruso both spun at Turn 2 early in the session. Whincup said of his spin: "It was a bit of a wild ride, my foot slipped off the pedal so it was a weird one."

=== Race 7 ===
Race 7 took place on Sunday afternoon. The race regulations required each car to take on at least 120 litres of fuel during the race. Coulthard's car had a misfire on the warm-up lap and he was slow to get away at the start as a result. He completed only four laps before retiring from the race. Whincup challenged McLaughlin for the lead at the start but went wide at the first corner, though he maintained second place. Mostert was spun at Turn 4 after Davison and Tander made contact. Several drivers pitted at the end of the first lap to fulfil part of the fuel requirement. McLaughlin made his first pit stop on lap 10, followed by Whincup on lap 11. After every driver had completed their first pit stop, McLaughlin led from Whincup, Pye, Lowndes and Caruso.

Van Gisbergen was the first driver to make a second stop on lap 18. McLaughlin pitted at the end of lap 21, while Whincup delayed his second stop until lap 25 in order to shorten the length of his final stint and have better tyre condition at the end of the race. Following the second round of pit stops, McLaughlin continued to lead ahead of Whincup and Pye. Cam Waters suffered a tyre failure on the main straight on lap 34 and was hit by Andre Heimgartner as he slowed. The safety car was deployed to allow debris from the incident to be cleared. Dale Wood, Van Gisbergen and Bright all pitted to take on fresh tyres. However, Bright was forced to retire from the race soon after when he lost power.

The race restarted on lap 39 and Winterbottom passed Pye for third place at the final corner. Whincup ran wide at the same time and dropped to fourth place. Moffat went off the circuit on lap 43 and dropped from eighth to 15th place. McLaughlin took the race win ahead of Winterbottom, Pye, Whincup and Lowndes. Mostert recovered from his early spin to finish eighth, while Van Gisbergen made it up to tenth, having been twentieth after pitting during the safety car period.

Whincup maintained the championship lead while McLaughlin moved into second place, 15 points behind. Winterbottom was third, a further nine points behind McLaughlin.

== Results ==
=== Race 6 ===
==== Qualifying ====
| Pos. | No. | Driver | Team | Car | Time |
|---|---|---|---|---|---|
| 1 | 33 | (New Zealand) Scott McLaughlin | Garry Rogers Motorsport | Volvo S60 | 1:30.4880 |
| 2 | 55 | (Australia) Chaz Mostert | Rod Nash Racing | Ford FG X Falcon | 1:30.5051 |
| 3 | 1 | (Australia) Mark Winterbottom | Prodrive Racing Australia | Ford FG X Falcon | 1:30.6503 |
| 4 | 88 | (Australia) Jamie Whincup | Triple Eight Race Engineering | Holden VF Commodore | 1:30.6668 |
| 5 | 97 | (New Zealand) Shane van Gisbergen | Triple Eight Race Engineering | Holden VF Commodore | 1:30.6936 |
| 6 | 23 | (Australia) Michael Caruso | Nissan Motorsport | Nissan Altima L33 | 1:30.7407 |
| 7 | 888 | (Australia) Craig Lowndes | Triple Eight Race Engineering | Holden VF Commodore | 1:30.8193 |
| 8 | 34 | (Australia) James Moffat | Garry Rogers Motorsport | Volvo S60 | 1:30.8605 |
| 9 | 12 | (New Zealand) Fabian Coulthard | DJR Team Penske | Ford FG X Falcon | 1:30.9669 |
| 10 | 17 | (Australia) Scott Pye | DJR Team Penske | Ford FG X Falcon | 1:30.9730 |
| 11 | 7 | (Australia) Todd Kelly | Nissan Motorsport | Nissan Altima L33 | 1:30.9854 |
| 12 | 14 | (Australia) Tim Slade | Brad Jones Racing | Holden VF Commodore | 1:31.0659 |
| 13 | 15 | (Australia) Rick Kelly | Nissan Motorsport | Nissan Altima L33 | 1:31.1099 |
| 14 | 22 | (Australia) James Courtney | Holden Racing Team | Holden VF Commodore | 1:31.1534 |
| 15 | 8 | (Australia) Jason Bright | Brad Jones Racing | Holden VF Commodore | 1:31.2574 |
| 16 | 9 | (Australia) David Reynolds | Erebus Motorsport | Holden VF Commodore | 1:31.2663 |
| 17 | 18 | (Australia) Lee Holdsworth | Team 18 | Holden VF Commodore | 1:31.3293 |
| 18 | 2 | (Australia) Garth Tander | Holden Racing Team | Holden VF Commodore | 1:31.4037 |
| 19 | 222 | (Australia) Nick Percat | Lucas Dumbrell Motorsport | Holden VF Commodore | 1:31.4228 |
| 20 | 40 | (Australia) Will Davison | Tekno Autosports | Holden VF Commodore | 1:31.4453 |
| 21 | 6 | (Australia) Cam Waters | Prodrive Racing Australia | Ford FG X Falcon | 1:31.4535 |
| 22 | 96 | (Australia) Dale Wood | Nissan Motorsport | Nissan Altima L33 | 1:31.4630 |
| 23 | 111 | (New Zealand) Chris Pither | Super Black Racing | Ford FG X Falcon | 1:31.6451 |
| 24 | 21 | (Australia) Tim Blanchard | Britek Motorsport | Holden VF Commodore | 1:31.9751 |
| 25 | 3 | (New Zealand) Andre Heimgartner | Lucas Dumbrell Motorsport | Holden VF Commodore | 1:32.0998 |
| 26 | 4 | (Australia) Aaren Russell | Erebus Motorsport | Holden VF Commodore | 1:33.1427 |

==== Race ====
| Pos. | No. | Driver | Team | Car | Laps | Time/Retired | Grid | Points |
|---|---|---|---|---|---|---|---|---|
| 1 | 33 | (New Zealand) Scott McLaughlin | Garry Rogers Motorsport | Volvo S60 | 27 | 42:39.8093 | 1 | 150 |
| 2 | 88 | (Australia) Jamie Whincup | Triple Eight Race Engineering | Holden VF Commodore | 27 | +1.2 s | 4 | 138 |
| 3 | 12 | (New Zealand) Fabian Coulthard | DJR Team Penske | Ford FG X Falcon | 27 | +10.9 s | 9 | 129 |
| 4 | 97 | (New Zealand) Shane van Gisbergen | Triple Eight Race Engineering | Holden VF Commodore | 27 | +16.8 s | 5 | 120 |
| 5 | 1 | (Australia) Mark Winterbottom | Prodrive Racing Australia | Ford FG X Falcon | 27 | +17.2 s | 3 | 111 |
| 6 | 888 | (Australia) Craig Lowndes | Triple Eight Race Engineering | Holden VF Commodore | 27 | +19.9 s | 7 | 102 |
| 7 | 34 | (Australia) James Moffat | Garry Rogers Motorsport | Volvo S60 | 27 | +23.4 s | 8 | 96 |
| 8 | 14 | (Australia) Tim Slade | Brad Jones Racing | Holden VF Commodore | 27 | +23.5 s | 12 | 90 |
| 9 | 2 | (Australia) Garth Tander | Holden Racing Team | Holden VF Commodore | 27 | +29.9 s | 18 | 84 |
| 10 | 8 | (Australia) Jason Bright | Brad Jones Racing | Holden VF Commodore | 27 | +30.3 s | 15 | 78 |
| 11 | 7 | (Australia) Todd Kelly | Nissan Motorsport | Nissan Altima L33 | 27 | +35.3 s | 11 | 72 |
| 12 | 9 | (Australia) David Reynolds | Erebus Motorsport | Holden VF Commodore | 27 | +35.4 s | 16 | 69 |
| 13 | 23 | (Australia) Michael Caruso | Nissan Motorsport | Nissan Altima L33 | 27 | +35.9 s | 6 | 66 |
| 14 | 15 | (Australia) Rick Kelly | Nissan Motorsport | Nissan Altima L33 | 27 | +38.3 s | 13 | 63 |
| 15 | 18 | (Australia) Lee Holdsworth | Team 18 | Holden VF Commodore | 27 | +38.4 s | 17 | 60 |
| 16 | 40 | (Australia) Will Davison | Tekno Autosports | Holden VF Commodore | 27 | +39.5 s | 20 | 57 |
| 17 | 222 | (Australia) Nick Percat | Lucas Dumbrell Motorsport | Holden VF Commodore | 27 | +39.9 s | 19 | 54 |
| 18 | 6 | (Australia) Cam Waters | Prodrive Racing Australia | Ford FG X Falcon | 27 | +42.6 s | 21 | 51 |
| 19 | 111 | (New Zealand) Chris Pither | Super Black Racing | Ford FG X Falcon | 27 | +44.7 s | 23 | 48 |
| 20 | 96 | (Australia) Dale Wood | Nissan Motorsport | Nissan Altima L33 | 27 | +46.2 s | 22 | 45 |
| 21 | 22 | (Australia) James Courtney | Holden Racing Team | Holden VF Commodore | 27 | +47.1 s | 14 | 42 |
| 22 | 21 | (Australia) Tim Blanchard | Britek Motorsport | Holden VF Commodore | 27 | +48.6 s | 24 | 39 |
| 23 | 55 | (Australia) Chaz Mostert | Rod Nash Racing | Ford FG X Falcon | 27 | +49.1 s | 2 | 36 |
| 24 | 3 | (New Zealand) Andre Heimgartner | Lucas Dumbrell Motorsport | Holden VF Commodore | 27 | +49.2 s | 25 | 33 |
| 25 | 4 | (Australia) Aaren Russell | Erebus Motorsport | Holden VF Commodore | 27 | +1:06.6 | 26 | 30 |
| 26 | 17 | (Australia) Scott Pye | DJR Team Penske | Ford FG X Falcon | 25 | +2 laps | 10 | 27 |

=== Race 7 ===
==== Qualifying ====
| Pos. | No. | Driver | Team | Car | Time |
|---|---|---|---|---|---|
| 1 | 33 | (New Zealand) Scott McLaughlin | Garry Rogers Motorsport | Volvo S60 | 1:30.7018 |
| 2 | 88 | (Australia) Jamie Whincup | Triple Eight Race Engineering | Holden VF Commodore | 1:30.7741 |
| 3 | 1 | (Australia) Mark Winterbottom | Prodrive Racing Australia | Ford FG X Falcon | 1:30.7825 |
| 4 | 12 | (New Zealand) Fabian Coulthard | DJR Team Penske | Ford FG X Falcon | 1:30.8049 |
| 5 | 34 | (Australia) James Moffat | Garry Rogers Motorsport | Volvo S60 | 1:30.9342 |
| 6 | 97 | (New Zealand) Shane van Gisbergen | Triple Eight Race Engineering | Holden VF Commodore | 1:30.9374 |
| 7 | 17 | (Australia) Scott Pye | DJR Team Penske | Ford FG X Falcon | 1:30.9898 |
| 8 | 15 | (Australia) Rick Kelly | Nissan Motorsport | Nissan Altima L33 | 1:31.0049 |
| 9 | 888 | (Australia) Craig Lowndes | Triple Eight Race Engineering | Holden VF Commodore | 1:31.0065 |
| 10 | 23 | (Australia) Michael Caruso | Nissan Motorsport | Nissan Altima L33 | 1:31.0938 |
| 11 | 18 | (Australia) Lee Holdsworth | Team 18 | Holden VF Commodore | 1:31.1087 |
| 12 | 7 | (Australia) Todd Kelly | Nissan Motorsport | Nissan Altima L33 | 1:31.1714 |
| 13 | 22 | (Australia) James Courtney | Holden Racing Team | Holden VF Commodore | 1:31.2091 |
| 14 | 55 | (Australia) Chaz Mostert | Rod Nash Racing | Ford FG X Falcon | 1:31.2515 |
| 15 | 14 | (Australia) Tim Slade | Brad Jones Racing | Holden VF Commodore | 1:31.3036 |
| 16 | 40 | (Australia) Will Davison | Tekno Autosports | Holden VF Commodore | 1:31.3376 |
| 17 | 8 | (Australia) Jason Bright | Brad Jones Racing | Holden VF Commodore | 1:31.3581 |
| 18 | 6 | (Australia) Cam Waters | Prodrive Racing Australia | Ford FG X Falcon | 1:31.4065 |
| 19 | 111 | (New Zealand) Chris Pither | Super Black Racing | Ford FG X Falcon | 1:31.6157 |
| 20 | 2 | (Australia) Garth Tander | Holden Racing Team | Holden VF Commodore | 1:31.6265 |
| 21 | 96 | (Australia) Dale Wood | Nissan Motorsport | Nissan Altima L33 | 1:31.6410 |
| 22 | 9 | (Australia) David Reynolds | Erebus Motorsport | Holden VF Commodore | 1:31.7126 |
| 23 | 21 | (Australia) Tim Blanchard | Britek Motorsport | Holden VF Commodore | 1:31.7927 |
| 24 | 3 | (New Zealand) Andre Heimgartner | Lucas Dumbrell Motorsport | Holden VF Commodore | 1:31.8163 |
| 25 | 222 | (Australia) Nick Percat | Lucas Dumbrell Motorsport | Holden VF Commodore | 1:32.1579 |
| 26 | 4 | (Australia) Aaren Russell | Erebus Motorsport | Holden VF Commodore | 1:32.9644 |

==== Race ====
| Pos. | No. | Driver | Team | Car | Laps | Time/Retired | Grid | Points |
|---|---|---|---|---|---|---|---|---|
| 1 | 33 | (New Zealand) Scott McLaughlin | Garry Rogers Motorsport | Volvo S60 | 45 | 1:17:33.4257 | 1 | 150 |
| 2 | 1 | (Australia) Mark Winterbottom | Prodrive Racing Australia | Ford FG X Falcon | 45 | +1.0 s | 3 | 138 |
| 3 | 17 | (Australia) Scott Pye | DJR Team Penske | Ford FG X Falcon | 45 | +2.9 s | 7 | 129 |
| 4 | 88 | (Australia) Jamie Whincup | Triple Eight Race Engineering | Holden VF Commodore | 45 | +3.3 s | 2 | 120 |
| 5 | 888 | (Australia) Craig Lowndes | Triple Eight Race Engineering | Holden VF Commodore | 45 | +3.8 s | 9 | 111 |
| 6 | 23 | (Australia) Michael Caruso | Nissan Motorsport | Nissan Altima L33 | 45 | +6.4 s | 10 | 102 |
| 7 | 22 | (Australia) James Courtney | Holden Racing Team | Holden VF Commodore | 45 | +7.0 s | 13 | 96 |
| 8 | 55 | (Australia) Chaz Mostert | Rod Nash Racing | Ford FG X Falcon | 45 | +7.9 s | 14 | 90 |
| 9 | 40 | (Australia) Will Davison | Tekno Autosports | Holden VF Commodore | 45 | +9.7 s | 16 | 84 |
| 10 | 97 | (New Zealand) Shane van Gisbergen | Triple Eight Race Engineering | Holden VF Commodore | 45 | +10.7 s | 6 | 78 |
| 11 | 15 | (Australia) Rick Kelly | Nissan Motorsport | Nissan Altima L33 | 45 | +13.1 s | 8 | 72 |
| 12 | 7 | (Australia) Todd Kelly | Nissan Motorsport | Nissan Altima L33 | 45 | +13.4 s | 12 | 69 |
| 13 | 14 | (Australia) Tim Slade | Brad Jones Racing | Holden VF Commodore | 45 | +13.9 s | 15 | 66 |
| 14 | 9 | (Australia) David Reynolds | Erebus Motorsport | Holden VF Commodore | 45 | +15.4 s | 22 | 63 |
| 15 | 34 | (Australia) James Moffat | Garry Rogers Motorsport | Volvo S60 | 45 | +16.4 s | 5 | 60 |
| 16 | 2 | (Australia) Garth Tander | Holden Racing Team | Holden VF Commodore | 45 | +17.2 s | 20 | 57 |
| 17 | 21 | (Australia) Tim Blanchard | Britek Motorsport | Holden VF Commodore | 45 | +17.3 s | 23 | 54 |
| 18 | 96 | (Australia) Dale Wood | Nissan Motorsport | Nissan Altima L33 | 45 | +17.7 s | 21 | 51 |
| 19 | 18 | (Australia) Lee Holdsworth | Team 18 | Holden VF Commodore | 45 | +18.8 s | 11 | 48 |
| 20 | 222 | (Australia) Nick Percat | Lucas Dumbrell Motorsport | Holden VF Commodore | 45 | +21.4 s | 25 | 45 |
| 21 | 3 | (New Zealand) Andre Heimgartner | Lucas Dumbrell Motorsport | Holden VF Commodore | 45 | +22.3 s | 24 | 42 |
| 22 | 4 | (Australia) Aaren Russell | Erebus Motorsport | Holden VF Commodore | 45 | +25.1 s | 26 | 39 |
| 23 | 6 | (Australia) Cam Waters | Prodrive Racing Australia | Ford FG X Falcon | 44 | +1 lap | 18 | 36 |
| 24 | 111 | (New Zealand) Chris Pither | Super Black Racing | Ford FG X Falcon | 36 | +9 laps | 19 | 33 |
| Ret | 8 | (Australia) Jason Bright | Brad Jones Racing | Holden VF Commodore | 35 | Oil pressure | 17 | |
| Ret | 12 | (New Zealand) Fabian Coulthard | DJR Team Penske | Ford FG X Falcon | 3 | Engine | 4 | |

== Championship standings after the event ==
- After Race 7 of 29. Only the top five positions are included for both sets of standings.

Drivers' Championship standings

| | Pos. | Driver | Points |
|---|---|---|---|
| 2 | 1 | (Australia) Jamie Whincup | 651 |
| 8 | 2 | (New Zealand) Scott McLaughlin | 636 |
| 1 | 3 | (Australia) Mark Winterbottom | 627 |
| 2 | 4 | (Australia) Craig Lowndes | 615 |
| 4 | 5 | (Australia) Will Davison | 558 |

Teams' Championship standings

| | Pos. | Constructor | Points |
|---|---|---|---|
| | 1 | Triple Eight Race Engineering | 1196 |
| | 2 | Holden Racing Team | 1003 |
| | 3 | Prodrive Racing Australia | 994 |
| 2 | 4 | Garry Rogers Motorsport | 990 |
| 1 | 5 | Nissan Motorsport | 865 |
