= 2017 Newcastle 500 =

2017 V8 Supercar championship race

(New South Wales) 2017 Coates Hire Newcastle 500
Event Information
- Round 14 of 14 in the 2017 Supercars Championship
- Date: 24–26 November 2017
- Location: Newcastle East, New South Wales
- Venue: Newcastle Street Circuit
- Weather: Friday: Fine; Saturday: Fine; Sunday: Light cloud

Results
Race 1
Distance	91 laps	241 km
Pole position	(New Zealand) Scott McLaughlin; DJR Team Penske	1:09.9064
Winner	(New Zealand) Scott McLaughlin; DJR Team Penske	2:00:01.7051
Race 2
Distance	95 laps	250 km
Pole position	(New Zealand) Scott McLaughlin; DJR Team Penske	1:10.5212
Winner	(Australia) Jamie Whincup; Triple Eight Race Engineering	2:00:09.8054

The 2017 Coates Hire Newcastle 500 was a motor racing event for the Supercars Championship, held on the weekend of 24 to 26 November 2017. The event was held on the Newcastle Street Circuit in Newcastle East, New South Wales and consisted of two races, 250 kilometres in length. It was the fourteenth and final event in the 2017 Supercars Championship and hosted Races 25 and 26 of the season.

The event was the first running of the Newcastle 500, following the discontinuation of the Sydney 500 at the conclusion of the 2016 season.

== Background ==
Five drivers came into the final event of the series with a mathematical chance of securing the title, the highest number since 2005. The event offered a maximum of 300 points, 150 per race win. Jamie Whincup led the championship on 2850 points, 30 points ahead of Scott McLaughlin. McLaughlin's team-mate Fabian Coulthard sat third, 176 points behind Whincup. Chaz Mostert and Shane van Gisbergen were the other two drivers in the title fight, but both were over 250 points behind Whincup.

Taz Douglas replaced Jack Perkins at Lucas Dumbrell Motorsport.

== Report ==
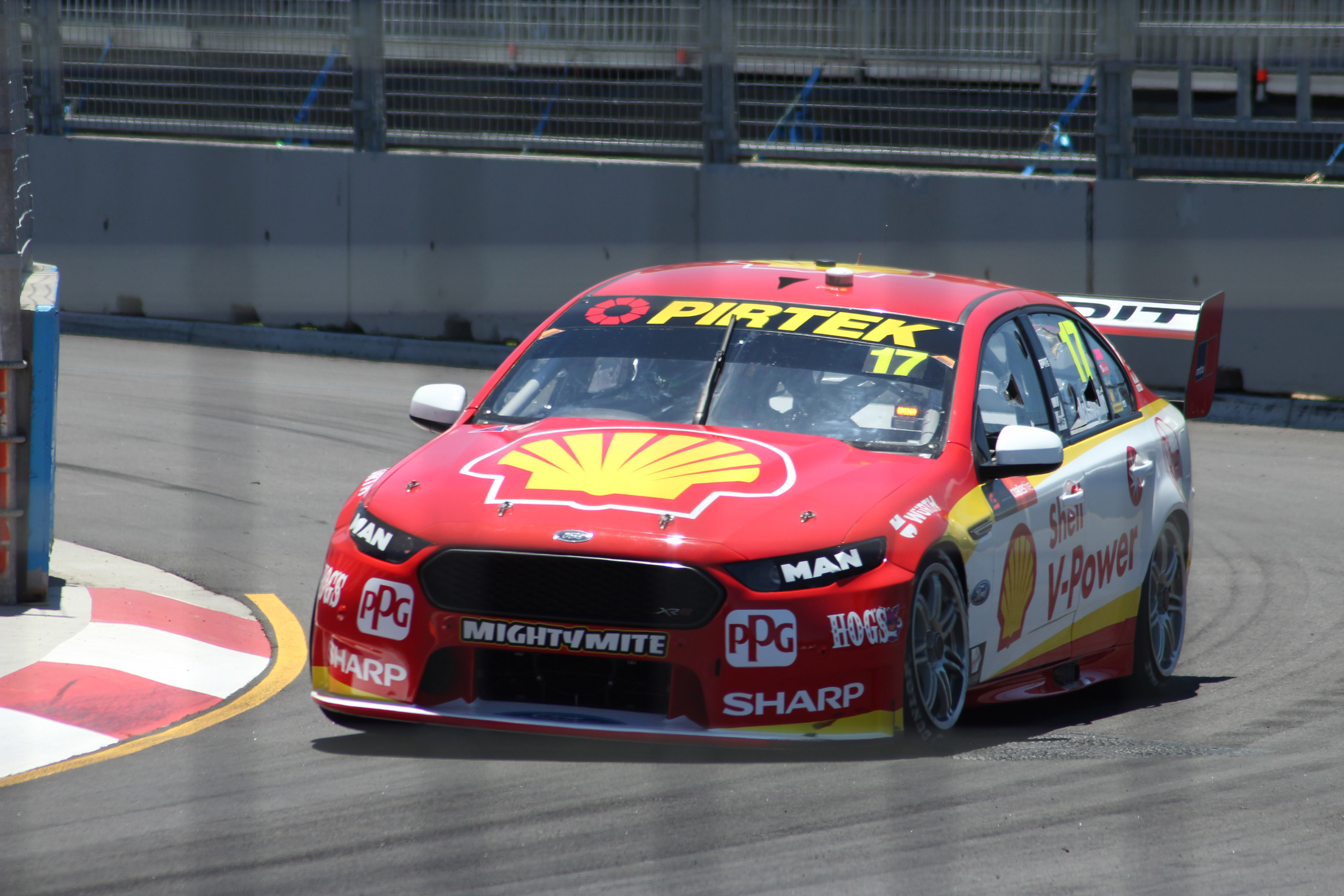
Scott McLaughlin scored pole position for both races and won the first race of the weekend

=== Practice ===
Practice summary
Session	Day	Fastest lap				
Session	Day	No.	Driver	Team	Car	Time
Practice 1	Friday	88	(Australia) Jamie Whincup	Triple Eight Race Engineering	Holden VF Commodore	1:10.1577
Practice 2	Friday	17	(New Zealand) Scott McLaughlin	DJR Team Penske	Ford FG X Falcon	1:09.5949

=== Race 25 ===
==== Qualifying ====
Pos.	No.	Name	Team	Car	Time
1	17	(New Zealand) Scott McLaughlin	DJR Team Penske	Ford FG X Falcon	1:09.9064
2	9	(Australia) David Reynolds	Erebus Motorsport	Holden VF Commodore	+0.0098
3	97	(New Zealand) Shane van Gisbergen	Triple Eight Race Engineering	Holden VF Commodore	+0.0418
4	23	(Australia) Michael Caruso	Nissan Motorsport	Nissan L33 Altima	+0.0586
5	88	(Australia) Jamie Whincup	Triple Eight Race Engineering	Holden VF Commodore	+0.0923
6	15	(Australia) Rick Kelly	Nissan Motorsport	Nissan L33 Altima	+0.1241
7	19	(Australia) Will Davison	Tekno Autosports	Holden VF Commodore	+0.1420
8	12	(New Zealand) Fabian Coulthard	DJR Team Penske	Ford FG X Falcon	+0.1774
9	22	(Australia) James Courtney	Walkinshaw Racing	Holden VF Commodore	+0.3143
10	55	(Australia) Chaz Mostert	Rod Nash Racing	Ford FG X Falcon	+0.3157
11	5	(Australia) Mark Winterbottom	Prodrive Racing Australia	Ford FG X Falcon	+0.3292
12	8	(Australia) Nick Percat	Brad Jones Racing	Holden VF Commodore	+0.3699
13	34	(Australia) James Moffat	Garry Rogers Motorsport	Holden VF Commodore	+0.3713
14	7	(Australia) Todd Kelly	Nissan Motorsport	Nissan L33 Altima	+0.3835
15	14	(Australia) Tim Slade	Brad Jones Racing	Holden VF Commodore	+0.4333
16	33	(Australia) Garth Tander	Garry Rogers Motorsport	Holden VF Commodore	+0.4572
17	02	(Australia) Scott Pye	Walkinshaw Racing	Holden VF Commodore	+0.5032
18	18	(Australia) Lee Holdsworth	Team 18	Holden VF Commodore	+0.5235
19	6	(Australia) Cam Waters	Prodrive Racing Australia	Ford FG X Falcon	+0.5479
20	888	(Australia) Craig Lowndes	Triple Eight Race Engineering	Holden VF Commodore	+0.5949
21	99	(Australia) Dale Wood	Erebus Motorsport	Holden VF Commodore	+0.5974
22	78	(Switzerland) Simona de Silvestro	Nissan Motorsport	Nissan L33 Altima	+0.6975
23	3	(Australia) Aaren Russell	Lucas Dumbrell Motorsport	Holden VF Commodore	+1.0462
24	21	(Australia) Tim Blanchard	Tim Blanchard Racing	Holden VF Commodore	+1.1732
25	56	(Australia) Jason Bright	Britek Motorsport	Ford FG X Falcon	+1.2089
26	62	(Australia) Taz Douglas	Lucas Dumbrell Motorsport	Holden VF Commodore	+1.3401

==== Race ====
Pos	No.	Driver	Team	Car	Laps	Time / Retired	Grid	Points
1	17	(New Zealand) Scott McLaughlin	DJR Team Penske	Ford FG X Falcon	91	2:00:01.7051	1	150
2	12	(New Zealand) Fabian Coulthard	DJR Team Penske	Ford FG X Falcon	91	+2.4430	8	138
3	14	(Australia) Tim Slade	Brad Jones Racing	Holden VF Commodore	91	+3.5060	15	129
4	18	(Australia) Lee Holdsworth	Team 18	Holden VF Commodore	91	+4.1874	18	120
5	9	(Australia) David Reynolds	Erebus Motorsport	Holden VF Commodore	91	+10.9000	2	111
6	55	(Australia) Chaz Mostert	Rod Nash Racing	Ford FG X Falcon	91	+11.8228	10	102
7	02	(Australia) Scott Pye	Walkinshaw Racing	Holden VF Commodore	91	+12.9853	17	96
8	8	(Australia) Nick Percat	Brad Jones Racing	Holden VF Commodore	91	+13.8657	12	90
9	19	(Australia) Will Davison	Tekno Autosports	Holden VF Commodore	91	+14.3288	7	84
10	15	(Australia) Rick Kelly	Nissan Motorsport	Nissan L33 Altima	91	+15.6008	6	78
11	33	(Australia) Garth Tander	Garry Rogers Motorsport	Holden VF Commodore	91	+17.5093	16	72
12	21	(Australia) Tim Blanchard	Tim Blanchard Racing	Holden VF Commodore	91	+18.1966	24	69
13	6	(Australia) Cam Waters	Prodrive Racing Australia	Ford FG X Falcon	91	+18.6987	19	66
14	23	(Australia) Michael Caruso	Nissan Motorsport	Nissan L33 Altima	91	+19.0794	4	63
15	7	(Australia) Todd Kelly	Nissan Motorsport	Nissan L33 Altima	91	+21.3520	14	60
16	97	(New Zealand) Shane van Gisbergen	Triple Eight Race Engineering	Holden VF Commodore	91	+24.4358^{1}	3	57
17	5	(Australia) Mark Winterbottom	Prodrive Racing Australia	Ford FG X Falcon	89	+2 Laps	11	54
18	99	(Australia) Dale Wood	Erebus Motorsport	Holden VF Commodore	89	+2 Laps	21	51
19	22	(Australia) James Courtney	Walkinshaw Racing	Holden VF Commodore	88	+3 Laps	9	48
20	78	(Switzerland) Simona de Silvestro	Nissan Motorsport	Nissan L33 Altima	83	+8 Laps	22	45
21	88	(Australia) Jamie Whincup	Triple Eight Race Engineering	Holden VF Commodore	78	+13 Laps	5	42
Ret	888	(Australia) Craig Lowndes	Triple Eight Race Engineering	Holden VF Commodore	62	Accident damage	20	
Ret	34	(Australia) James Moffat	Garry Rogers Motorsport	Holden VF Commodore	54	Accident	13	
Ret	3	(Australia) Aaren Russell	Lucas Dumbrell Motorsport	Holden VF Commodore	31	Accident	23	
Ret	56	(Australia) Jason Bright	Britek Motorsport	Ford FG X Falcon	1	Accident damage	25	
Ret	62	(Australia) Taz Douglas	Lucas Dumbrell Motorsport	Holden VF Commodore	1	Accident damage	26	

- ^1 Shane van Gisbergen received a 15-second penalty for a driving infringement.

=== Race 26 ===
==== Qualifying ====
Pos.	No.	Name	Team	Car	Time
1	5	(Australia) Mark Winterbottom	Prodrive Racing Australia	Ford FG X Falcon	1:10.2009
2	97	(New Zealand) Shane van Gisbergen	Triple Eight Race Engineering	Holden VF Commodore	+0.0036
3	9	(Australia) David Reynolds	Erebus Motorsport	Holden VF Commodore	+0.1266
4	17	(New Zealand) Scott McLaughlin	DJR Team Penske	Ford FG X Falcon	+0.1705
5	15	(Australia) Rick Kelly	Nissan Motorsport	Nissan L33 Altima	+0.2052
6	88	(Australia) Jamie Whincup	Triple Eight Race Engineering	Holden VF Commodore	+0.2320
7	55	(Australia) Chaz Mostert	Rod Nash Racing	Ford FG X Falcon	+0.2416
8	23	(Australia) Michael Caruso	Nissan Motorsport	Nissan L33 Altima	+0.3075
9	7	(Australia) Todd Kelly	Nissan Motorsport	Nissan L33 Altima	+0.3270
10	12	(New Zealand) Fabian Coulthard	DJR Team Penske	Ford FG X Falcon	+0.3596
11	19	(Australia) Will Davison	Tekno Autosports	Holden VF Commodore	+0.3949
12	6	(Australia) Cam Waters	Prodrive Racing Australia	Ford FG X Falcon	+0.4323
13	18	(Australia) Lee Holdsworth	Team 18	Holden VF Commodore	+0.4390
14	34	(Australia) James Moffat	Garry Rogers Motorsport	Holden VF Commodore	+0.4720
15	8	(Australia) Nick Percat	Brad Jones Racing	Holden VF Commodore	+0.4971
16	14	(Australia) Tim Slade	Brad Jones Racing	Holden VF Commodore	+0.4974
17	78	(Switzerland) Simona de Silvestro	Nissan Motorsport	Nissan L33 Altima	+0.6723
18	02	(Australia) Scott Pye	Walkinshaw Racing	Holden VF Commodore	+0.7706
19	33	(Australia) Garth Tander	Garry Rogers Motorsport	Holden VF Commodore	+0.8185
20	56	(Australia) Jason Bright	Britek Motorsport	Ford FG X Falcon	+0.8270
21	21	(Australia) Tim Blanchard	Tim Blanchard Racing	Holden VF Commodore	+0.8280
22	888	(Australia) Craig Lowndes	Triple Eight Race Engineering	Holden VF Commodore	+0.8506
23	99	(Australia) Dale Wood	Erebus Motorsport	Holden VF Commodore	+1.0239
24	22	(Australia) James Courtney	Walkinshaw Racing	Holden VF Commodore	+1.1635
25	3	(Australia) Aaren Russell	Lucas Dumbrell Motorsport	Holden VF Commodore	+1.4382
26	62	(Australia) Taz Douglas	Lucas Dumbrell Motorsport	Holden VF Commodore	+1.4502

==== Top 10 Shootout ====
Pos.	No.	Driver	Team	Car	Time	Gap
1	17	(New Zealand) Scott McLaughlin	DJR Team Penske	Ford FG X Falcon	1:10.5211	
2	97	(New Zealand) Shane van Gisbergen	Triple Eight Race Engineering	Holden VF Commodore	1:10.5502	+0.0290
3	9	(Australia) David Reynolds	Erebus Motorsport	Holden VF Commodore	1:10.6765	+0.1554
4	5	(Australia) Mark Winterbottom	Prodrive Racing Australia	Ford FG X Falcon	1:10.8429	+0.3217
5	88	(Australia) Jamie Whincup	Triple Eight Race Engineering	Holden VF Commodore	1:10.8665	+0.3453
6	15	(Australia) Rick Kelly	Nissan Motorsport	Nissan L33 Altima	1:10.9438	+0.4226
7	23	(Australia) Michael Caruso	Nissan Motorsport	Nissan L33 Altima	1:11.0045	+0.4834
8	12	(New Zealand) Fabian Coulthard	DJR Team Penske	Ford FG X Falcon	1:11.0174	+0.4963
9	55	(Australia) Chaz Mostert	Rod Nash Racing	Ford FG X Falcon	1:11.3532	+0.8320
10	7	(Australia) Todd Kelly	Nissan Motorsport	Nissan L33 Altima	1:11.8448	+1.3236

==== Race ====
Pos	No.	Driver	Team	Car	Laps	Time / Retired	Grid	Points
1	88	(Australia) Jamie Whincup	Triple Eight Race Engineering	Holden VF Commodore	95	2:00:09.8054	5	150
2	97	(New Zealand) Shane van Gisbergen	Triple Eight Race Engineering	Holden VF Commodore	95	+4.481	2	138
3	9	(Australia) David Reynolds	Erebus Motorsport	Holden VF Commodore	95	+5.717	3	129
4	15	(Australia) Rick Kelly	Nissan Motorsport	Nissan L33 Altima	95	+6.682	6	120
5	23	(Australia) Michael Caruso	Nissan Motorsport	Nissan L33 Altima	95	+7.550	7	111
6	8	(Australia) Nick Percat	Brad Jones Racing	Holden VF Commodore	95	+8.847	15	102
7	5	(Australia) Mark Winterbottom	Prodrive Racing Australia	Ford FG X Falcon	95	+9.785	4	96
8	18	(Australia) Lee Holdsworth	Team 18	Holden VF Commodore	95	+10.289	13	90
9	19	(Australia) Will Davison	Tekno Autosports	Holden VF Commodore	95	+10.626	11	84
10	7	(Australia) Todd Kelly	Nissan Motorsport	Nissan L33 Altima	95	+12.216	10	78
11	14	(Australia) Tim Slade	Brad Jones Racing	Holden VF Commodore	95	+18.335	16	72
12	33	(Australia) Garth Tander	Garry Rogers Motorsport	Holden VF Commodore	95	+19.859	19	69
13	34	(Australia) James Moffat	Garry Rogers Motorsport	Holden VF Commodore	95	+23.269	14	66
14	02	(Australia) Scott Pye	Walkinshaw Racing	Holden VF Commodore	95	+23.792	18	63
15	55	(Australia) Chaz Mostert	Rod Nash Racing	Ford FG X Falcon	95	+24.026	9	60
16	21	(Australia) Tim Blanchard	Tim Blanchard Racing	Holden VF Commodore	95	+26.800	21	57
17	78	(Switzerland) Simona de Silvestro	Nissan Motorsport	Nissan L33 Altima	95	+29.601	17	54
18	17	(New Zealand) Scott McLaughlin	DJR Team Penske	Ford FG X Falcon	95	+42.624^{1}	1	51
19	3	(Australia) Aaren Russell	Lucas Dumbrell Motorsport	Holden VF Commodore	95	+45.225	25	48
20	99	(Australia) Dale Wood	Erebus Motorsport	Holden VF Commodore	94	+1 Lap	23	45
21	62	(Australia) Taz Douglas	Lucas Dumbrell Motorsport	Holden VF Commodore	94	+1 Lap	26	42
22	56	(Australia) Jason Bright	Britek Motorsport	Ford FG X Falcon	93	+2 Laps	20	39
23	6	(Australia) Cam Waters	Prodrive Racing Australia	Ford FG X Falcon	92	+3 Laps	12	36
24	22	(Australia) James Courtney	Walkinshaw Racing	Holden VF Commodore	91	+4 Laps	24	33
Ret	888	(Australia) Craig Lowndes	Triple Eight Race Engineering	Holden VF Commodore	93	Accident	22	
Ret	12	(New Zealand) Fabian Coulthard	DJR Team Penske	Ford FG X Falcon	15	Driveshaft	8	

- ^1 Scott McLaughlin received a 25-second penalty for a driving infringement.

== Standings after the event ==
Drivers Championship

Pos	Driver	Pts	Gap
1	(Australia) Jamie Whincup	3042	
2	(New Zealand) Scott McLaughlin	3021	+21
3	(New Zealand) Fabian Coulthard	2812	+230
4	(New Zealand) Shane van Gisbergen	2769	+273
5	(Australia) Chaz Mostert	2748	+294

Teams Championship

Pos	Team	Pts	Gap
1	DJR Team Penske	5868	
2	Triple Eight Race Engineering (88, 97)	5811	+57
3	Prodrive Racing Australia	4416	+1452
4	Garry Rogers Motorsport	3711	+2157
5	Erebus Motorsport	3477	+2391

- Note: Only the top five positions are included for both sets of standings.
