= 2016 Tasmania SuperSprint =

2016 Tyrepower Tasmania SuperSprint
Event Information
- Round 2 of 14 in the 2016 International V8 Supercars Championship
- Date: 1–3 April 2016
- Location: Launceston, Tasmania
- Venue: Symmons Plains Raceway
- Weather: Friday: fine Saturday: fine Sunday: fine

Results
Race 1
Distance	50 laps	120 km
Pole position	Mark Winterbottom; Prodrive Racing Australia	51.1530
Winner	Shane van Gisbergen; Triple Eight Race Engineering	44:25.1871
Race 2
Distance	84 laps	200 km
Pole position	Mark Winterbottom; Prodrive Racing Australia	51.0773
Winner	Will Davison; Tekno Autosports	1:20:51.7031

The 2016 Tyrepower Tasmania SuperSprint was an Australian motor racing event for V8 Supercars, held on the weekend of 1 to 3 April 2016. The event was held at Symmons Plains Raceway in Launceston, Tasmania, and consisted of one race of 120 kilometres and one race of 200 km in length. It was the second event of fourteen in the 2016 International V8 Supercars Championship and hosted Races 4 and 5 of the season. The event was the 44th running of the Tasmania SuperSprint.

Defending series champion Mark Winterbottom started from pole position in both races, but was unable to take victory in either race. Triple Eight Race Engineering teammates Shane van Gisbergen and Jamie Whincup finished first and second in Race 4, ahead of Will Davison. Davison took victory in Race 5, passing both Van Gisbergen and Winterbottom in the closing laps after the latter pair went off the circuit due to oil dropped by Winterbottom's teammate Cam Waters. Craig Lowndes finished second while Winterbottom recovered to take third. Van Gisbergen, after leading for most of the race, did not finish after getting stuck in a gravel trap. Davison's win elevated him to the championship lead, 15 points clear of Lowndes, with Whincup a further nine points behind in third.

== Report ==
=== Background ===
The event was the first to feature the revised SuperSprint race format, which was introduced for the 2016 season. A single 120 km race was held on Saturday, with drivers required to make a pit stop to change tyres. The 120 km race replaces the pair of 60 km races which had been held on the Saturday of SuperSprint events in 2015. It was also the first event held at the circuit following upgrades which had taken place across December 2015 and January 2016, which included the installation of new concrete barriers on the inside of the circuit and the reconditioning of the gravel traps.

Following confusion over race start regulations at the Clipsal 500 Adelaide, the rules regarding race starts under control of the safety car were amended. Previously, if a formation lap had not been completed, the race would not officially start until the safety car returned to the pit lane. The new rules stated that the race would start once the cars left the grid behind the safety car, regardless of whether or not the formation lap had been completed.

Michael Caruso entered the event as the championship leader ahead of Jamie Whincup and Shane van Gisbergen.

=== Practice ===
The first one-hour practice session was held on Friday morning. James Moffat set a time of 51.8869 to be fastest ahead of Whincup and Craig Lowndes. Whincup noted the impact of the circuit upgrades on the track condition, saying: "The side effect of the recent works is some loose dirt which has blown across the track, but I’m certainly not going to complain about that." Mark Winterbottom was quickest in the second one-hour session, which was held on Friday afternoon. His teammate Cam Waters was second fastest ahead of Whincup, Shane van Gisbergen and Lowndes. The cars of Whincup and Chaz Mostert both had precautionary engine changes overnight, ahead of the third and final practice session on Saturday morning, which was 15 minutes in duration. Winterbottom was again fastest, with a time of 51.0978. Scott McLaughlin was second quickest ahead of Fabian Coulthard.

Practice summary
Session	Day	Fastest lap				
Session	Day	No.	Driver	Team	Car	Time
Practice 1	Friday	34	(Australia) James Moffat	Garry Rogers Motorsport	Volvo S60	51.8869
Practice 2	Friday	1	(Australia) Mark Winterbottom	Prodrive Racing Australia	Ford FG X Falcon	51.4225
Practice 3	Saturday	1	(Australia) Mark Winterbottom	Prodrive Racing Australia	Ford FG X Falcon	51.0978

=== Qualifying – Race 4 ===
Qualifying for Race 4 took place on Saturday afternoon and consisted of a single 15-minute session. Winterbottom continued his form from the practice sessions to take pole position with a time of 51.1530, two one-hundredths of a second faster than Lowndes. Both drivers went off the circuit during the session, with Winterbottom going off at Turn 2 and Lowndes at Turn 6. Van Gisbergen was third ahead of Lee Holdsworth and Will Davison. Nick Percat spun at Turn 4 late in the session which affected several drivers' laps.

=== Race 4 ===
Race 4 was held on Saturday afternoon. McLaughlin's car experienced an engine problem prior to the start of the race, forcing him to start from the pit lane before repair work left him ten laps behind the leaders. Winterbottom held the lead from pole position ahead of Lowndes and Van Gisbergen. Holdsworth lost places in the early laps, while Whincup moved up to fifth place before being the first driver to make his compulsory pit stop at the end of lap 4. After other drivers made their pit stops in the following laps, Whincup emerged ahead of Van Gisbergen, Lowndes, Davison and Rick Kelly, while Winterbottom dropped back after a slow pit stop and going off the circuit to avoid Lowndes after he left the pit lane. Van Gisbergen passed Whincup for the effective race lead on lap 17.

Brad Jones Racing pitted their drivers later in the race, with Jason Bright stopping on lap 20 and Tim Slade on lap 28. Tim Blanchard was the final driver to take his pit stop on lap 32, leaving Van Gisbergen in the lead ahead of Whincup, Lowndes, Davison and Rick Kelly. Davison passed Lowndes for third on lap 34, while Bright and Slade were taking advantage of their younger tyres to make up positions. Van Gisbergen went on to take victory over Whincup by nine tenths of a second, with Davison finishing another two tenths behind. Rick Kelly was able to pass Lowndes for fourth, while Bright made it up to sixth place. Waters finished seventh ahead of Slade, with Winterbottom and Mostert completing the top ten. Van Gisbergen's win was the 500th for Holden in the combined history of the Australian Touring Car Championship and V8 Supercars Championship.

=== Qualifying – Race 5 ===
A single 20-minute qualifying session, held on Sunday morning, was used to determine the grid for Race 5. Davison set the fastest lap time during the session, but was given a two-place grid penalty for blocking James Courtney. As a result, pole position was awarded to Winterbottom, who set the second fastest time. Davison was unaware that he had impeded Courtney, saying: "I had no idea he was there." Van Gisbergen was third fastest, which would see him start from second on the grid, while Whincup was fourth ahead of Holdsworth and Mostert.

=== Race 5 ===
Race 5 took place on Sunday afternoon. The race regulations required each car to take on at least 120 litres of fuel during the race. Winterbottom and Van Gisbergen battled for the lead in the opening laps, with Van Gisbergen taking the lead on lap 3. Whincup took advantage of Van Gisbergen's pass to move into second place. On lap 5, Percat and Chris Pither made contact on the exit of Turn 4, which sent Pither spinning into the wall, severely damaging his car. The safety car was deployed while Pither's car was retrieved and all of the drivers made their first pit stop, with the exception of Lowndes and Rick Kelly who had pitted on lap 1. Whincup lost multiple positions as he had to wait for Van Gisbergen's car to be serviced before he could complete his own pit stop. Van Gisbergen emerged in the lead ahead of Winterbottom, Rick Kelly, Lowndes and Mostert, while Whincup had dropped to 13th place.

Van Gisbergen and Winterbottom continued to battle after the safety car returned to the pit lane, but Van Gisbergen was eventually able to build a lead. The safety car was called for the second time on lap 40, when Whincup became stuck in the gravel trap at Turn 4, having run wide following his second pit stop. All of the other drivers came into the pit lane to take on their remaining fuel requirement. Waters' car was taken into the garage with an engine problem which left him several laps off the lead. Shortly after the safety car period ended, Rick Kelly began suffering from brake problems, which slowly worsened and eventually forced him to retire from the race on lap 57. Blanchard retired from the race on lap 74, when his front splitter collapsed under the front of the car and caused him to go off the circuit at Turn 6 and become stuck in a gravel trap.

Van Gisbergen looked set to take victory until lap 80, when Waters' car, which had returned to the circuit, suffered an engine failure on the run into Turn 4, depositing large amounts of oil onto the track. Andre Heimgartner and Whincup, immediately behind Waters, both went off the circuit and made heavy contact with each other. Heimgartner was beached in the gravel trap but Whincup was able to continue, while Moffat also spun. Van Gisbergen and Winterbottom both slid on the oil, with Van Gisbergen getting stuck in the gravel trap with his car against the barrier. This allowed Davison and Lowndes through into the top two positions, while Winterbottom recovered and assumed third place. Davison held on to take victory ahead of Lowndes and Winterbottom, with McLaughlin and Mostert completing the top five. Tander and Courtney finished sixth and seventh, having started 18th and 19th respectively.

The result saw Davison assume the championship lead ahead of Lowndes and Whincup, while Van Gisbergen dropped to seventh place, having led the points standings after Race 4.

== Results ==
=== Race 4 ===
==== Qualifying ====
Pos.	No.	Driver	Team	Car	Time
1	1	(Australia) Mark Winterbottom	Prodrive Racing Australia	Ford FG X Falcon	51.1530
2	888	(Australia) Craig Lowndes	Triple Eight Race Engineering	Holden VF Commodore	51.1718
3	97	(New Zealand) Shane van Gisbergen	Triple Eight Race Engineering	Holden VF Commodore	51.1877
4	18	(Australia) Lee Holdsworth	Charlie Schwerkolt Racing	Holden VF Commodore	51.2700
5	19	(Australia) Will Davison	Tekno Autosports	Holden VF Commodore	51.2847
6	15	(Australia) Rick Kelly	Nissan Motorsport	Nissan Altima L33	51.3823
7	88	(Australia) Jamie Whincup	Triple Eight Race Engineering	Holden VF Commodore	51.4094
8	33	(New Zealand) Scott McLaughlin	Garry Rogers Motorsport	Volvo S60	51.4195
9	8	(Australia) Jason Bright	Brad Jones Racing	Holden VF Commodore	51.4263
10	12	(New Zealand) Fabian Coulthard	DJR Team Penske	Ford FG X Falcon	51.4271
11	55	(Australia) Chaz Mostert	Rod Nash Racing	Ford FG X Falcon	51.4488
12	6	(Australia) Cam Waters	Prodrive Racing Australia	Ford FG X Falcon	51.4706
13	17	(Australia) Scott Pye	DJR Team Penske	Ford FG X Falcon	51.4763
14	2	(Australia) Garth Tander	Holden Racing Team	Holden VF Commodore	51.4915
15	111	(New Zealand) Chris Pither	Super Black Racing	Ford FG X Falcon	51.5050
16	21	(Australia) Tim Blanchard	Britek Motorsport	Holden VF Commodore	51.5842
17	22	(Australia) James Courtney	Holden Racing Team	Holden VF Commodore	51.5918
18	14	(Australia) Tim Slade	Brad Jones Racing	Holden VF Commodore	51.5936
19	9	(Australia) David Reynolds	Erebus Motorsport	Holden VF Commodore	51.6139
20	7	(Australia) Todd Kelly	Nissan Motorsport	Nissan Altima L33	51.6649
21	23	(Australia) Michael Caruso	Nissan Motorsport	Nissan Altima L33	51.6739
22	96	(Australia) Dale Wood	Nissan Motorsport	Nissan Altima L33	51.7735
23	34	(Australia) James Moffat	Garry Rogers Motorsport	Volvo S60	51.7852
24	222	(Australia) Nick Percat	Lucas Dumbrell Motorsport	Holden VF Commodore	51.8222
25	4	(Australia) Aaren Russell	Erebus Motorsport	Holden VF Commodore	51.8572
26	3	(New Zealand) Andre Heimgartner	Lucas Dumbrell Motorsport	Holden VF Commodore	51.8756

==== Race ====
Pos.	No.	Driver	Team	Car	Laps	Time/Retired	Grid	Points
1	97	(New Zealand) Shane van Gisbergen	Triple Eight Race Engineering	Holden VF Commodore	50	44:25.1871	3	150
2	88	(Australia) Jamie Whincup	Triple Eight Race Engineering	Holden VF Commodore	50	+0.9 s	7	138
3	19	(Australia) Will Davison	Tekno Autosports	Holden VF Commodore	50	+1.1 s	5	129
4	15	(Australia) Rick Kelly	Nissan Motorsport	Nissan Altima L33	50	+7.5 s	6	120
5	888	(Australia) Craig Lowndes	Triple Eight Race Engineering	Holden VF Commodore	50	+10.1 s	2	111
6	8	(Australia) Jason Bright	Brad Jones Racing	Holden VF Commodore	50	+13.0 s	9	102
7	6	(Australia) Cam Waters	Prodrive Racing Australia	Ford FG X Falcon	50	+15.3 s	12	96
8	14	(Australia) Tim Slade	Brad Jones Racing	Holden VF Commodore	50	+17.3 s	18	90
9	1	(Australia) Mark Winterbottom	Prodrive Racing Australia	Ford FG X Falcon	50	+17.6 s	1	84
10	55	(Australia) Chaz Mostert	Rod Nash Racing	Ford FG X Falcon	50	+18.2 s	11	78
11	2	(Australia) Garth Tander	Holden Racing Team	Holden VF Commodore	50	+20.3 s	14	72
12	18	(Australia) Lee Holdsworth	Charlie Schwerkolt Racing	Holden VF Commodore	50	+20.8 s	4	69
13	22	(Australia) James Courtney	Holden Racing Team	Holden VF Commodore	50	+23.6 s	17	66
14	17	(Australia) Scott Pye	DJR Team Penske	Ford FG X Falcon	50	+24.7 s	13	63
15	21	(Australia) Tim Blanchard	Britek Motorsport	Holden VF Commodore	50	+24.9 s	16	60
16	9	(Australia) David Reynolds	Erebus Motorsport	Holden VF Commodore	50	+29.6 s	19	57
17	111	(New Zealand) Chris Pither	Super Black Racing	Ford FG X Falcon	50	+30.6 s	15	54
18	12	(New Zealand) Fabian Coulthard	DJR Team Penske	Ford FG X Falcon	50	+31.7 s	10	51
19	7	(Australia) Todd Kelly	Nissan Motorsport	Nissan Altima L33	50	+31.7 s	20	48
20	34	(Australia) James Moffat	Garry Rogers Motorsport	Volvo S60	50	+31.9 s	23	45
21	23	(Australia) Michael Caruso	Nissan Motorsport	Nissan Altima L33	50	+32.2 s	21	42
22	96	(Australia) Dale Wood	Nissan Motorsport	Nissan Altima L33	50	+32.4 s	22	39
23	4	(Australia) Aaren Russell	Erebus Motorsport	Holden VF Commodore	50	+38.5 s	25	36
24	222	(Australia) Nick Percat	Lucas Dumbrell Motorsport	Holden VF Commodore	50	+38.8 s	24	33
25	3	(New Zealand) Andre Heimgartner	Lucas Dumbrell Motorsport	Holden VF Commodore	50	+47.3 s	26	30
26	33	(New Zealand) Scott McLaughlin	Garry Rogers Motorsport	Volvo S60	40	+10 laps	PL	27

=== Race 5 ===
==== Qualifying ====
Pos.	No.	Driver	Team	Car	Time
1 (Note: Davison was given a two-place grid penalty for impeding Courtney during qualifying for Race 5. As such, Winterbottom was officially recognised as having taken pole position.)	19	(Australia) Will Davison	Tekno Autosports	Holden VF Commodore	51.0177
2	1	(Australia) Mark Winterbottom	Prodrive Racing Australia	Ford FG X Falcon	51.0773
3	97	(New Zealand) Shane van Gisbergen	Triple Eight Race Engineering	Holden VF Commodore	51.1934
4	88	(Australia) Jamie Whincup	Triple Eight Race Engineering	Holden VF Commodore	51.1986
5	18	(Australia) Lee Holdsworth	Charlie Schwerkolt Racing	Holden VF Commodore	51.2104
6	55	(Australia) Chaz Mostert	Rod Nash Racing	Ford FG X Falcon	51.2133
7	8	(Australia) Jason Bright	Brad Jones Racing	Holden VF Commodore	51.2266
8	12	(New Zealand) Fabian Coulthard	DJR Team Penske	Ford FG X Falcon	51.2732
9	33	(New Zealand) Scott McLaughlin	Garry Rogers Motorsport	Volvo S60	51.2799
10	6	(Australia) Cam Waters	Prodrive Racing Australia	Ford FG X Falcon	51.2914
11	888	(Australia) Craig Lowndes	Triple Eight Race Engineering	Holden VF Commodore	51.2970
12	15	(Australia) Rick Kelly	Nissan Motorsport	Nissan Altima L33	51.3114
13	21	(Australia) Tim Blanchard	Britek Motorsport	Holden VF Commodore	51.3575
14	34	(Australia) James Moffat	Garry Rogers Motorsport	Volvo S60	51.3777
15	17	(Australia) Scott Pye	DJR Team Penske	Ford FG X Falcon	51.4496
16	23	(Australia) Michael Caruso	Nissan Motorsport	Nissan Altima L33	51.4591
17	14	(Australia) Tim Slade	Brad Jones Racing	Holden VF Commodore	51.4697
18	2	(Australia) Garth Tander	Holden Racing Team	Holden VF Commodore	51.4904
19	22	(Australia) James Courtney	Holden Racing Team	Holden VF Commodore	51.4930
20	111	(New Zealand) Chris Pither	Super Black Racing	Ford FG X Falcon	51.5837
21	7	(Australia) Todd Kelly	Nissan Motorsport	Nissan Altima L33	51.5972
22	9	(Australia) David Reynolds	Erebus Motorsport	Holden VF Commodore	51.6323
23	96	(Australia) Dale Wood	Nissan Motorsport	Nissan Altima L33	51.6542
24	3	(New Zealand) Andre Heimgartner	Lucas Dumbrell Motorsport	Holden VF Commodore	51.6950
25	222	(Australia) Nick Percat	Lucas Dumbrell Motorsport	Holden VF Commodore	51.7151
26	4	(Australia) Aaren Russell	Erebus Motorsport	Holden VF Commodore	51.9052

==== Race ====
Pos.	No.	Driver	Team	Car	Laps	Time/Retired	Grid	Points
1	19	(Australia) Will Davison	Tekno Autosports	Holden VF Commodore	84	1:20:51.7031	3	150
2	888	(Australia) Craig Lowndes	Triple Eight Race Engineering	Holden VF Commodore	84	+2.6 s	11	138
3	1	(Australia) Mark Winterbottom	Prodrive Racing Australia	Ford FG X Falcon	84	+4.0 s	1	129
4	33	(New Zealand) Scott McLaughlin	Garry Rogers Motorsport	Volvo S60	84	+6.4 s	9	120
5	55	(Australia) Chaz Mostert	Rod Nash Racing	Ford FG X Falcon	84	+8.5 s	6	111
6	2	(Australia) Garth Tander	Holden Racing Team	Holden VF Commodore	84	+9.6 s	18	102
7	22	(Australia) James Courtney	Holden Racing Team	Holden VF Commodore	84	+15.7 s	19	96
8	12	(New Zealand) Fabian Coulthard	DJR Team Penske	Ford FG X Falcon	84	+19.4 s	8	90
9	18	(Australia) Lee Holdsworth	Charlie Schwerkolt Racing	Holden VF Commodore	84	+20.9 s	5	84
10	8	(Australia) Jason Bright	Brad Jones Racing	Holden VF Commodore	84	+25.3 s	7	78
11	23	(Australia) Michael Caruso	Nissan Motorsport	Nissan Altima L33	84	+25.7 s	16	72
12	7	(Australia) Todd Kelly	Nissan Motorsport	Nissan Altima L33	84	+26.1 s	21	69
13	14	(Australia) Tim Slade	Brad Jones Racing	Holden VF Commodore	84	+26.3 s	17	66
14	17	(Australia) Scott Pye	DJR Team Penske	Ford FG X Falcon	84	+27.5 s	15	63
15	222	(Australia) Nick Percat	Lucas Dumbrell Motorsport	Holden VF Commodore	84	+29.1 s	25	60
16	34	(Australia) James Moffat	Garry Rogers Motorsport	Volvo S60	84	+47.1 s	14	57
17	4	(Australia) Aaren Russell	Erebus Motorsport	Holden VF Commodore	84	+47.4 s	26	54
18	9	(Australia) David Reynolds	Erebus Motorsport	Holden VF Commodore	83	+1 lap	22	51
19	88	(Australia) Jamie Whincup	Triple Eight Race Engineering	Holden VF Commodore	79	+5 laps	4	48
20	96	(Australia) Dale Wood	Nissan Motorsport	Nissan Altima L33	78	+6 laps	23	45
Ret	97	(New Zealand) Shane van Gisbergen	Triple Eight Race Engineering	Holden VF Commodore	79	Stuck in gravel	2	
Ret	3	(New Zealand) Andre Heimgartner	Lucas Dumbrell Motorsport	Holden VF Commodore	77	Stuck in gravel	24	
Ret	21	(Australia) Tim Blanchard	Britek Motorsport	Holden VF Commodore	74	Stuck in gravel	13	
Ret	6	(Australia) Cam Waters	Prodrive Racing Australia	Ford FG X Falcon	63	Engine	10	
Ret	15	(Australia) Rick Kelly	Nissan Motorsport	Nissan Altima L33	57	Brakes	12	
Ret	111	(New Zealand) Chris Pither	Super Black Racing	Ford FG X Falcon	3	Accident	20	

== Championship standings after the event ==
- After Race 5 of 29. Only the top five positions are included for both sets of standings.

Drivers' Championship standings

	Pos.	Driver	Points
14	1	(Australia) Will Davison	417
12	2	(Australia) Craig Lowndes	402
1	3	(Australia) Jamie Whincup	393
8	4	(Australia) Mark Winterbottom	378
	5	(Australia) Garth Tander	361

Teams' Championship standings

	Pos.	Constructor	Points
	1	Triple Eight Race Engineering	740
	2	Holden Racing Team	724
1	3	Prodrive Racing Australia	658
1	4	Nissan Motorsport	589
4	5	Brad Jones Racing	567
