= Dale Wood (racing driver) =

Australian racing driver

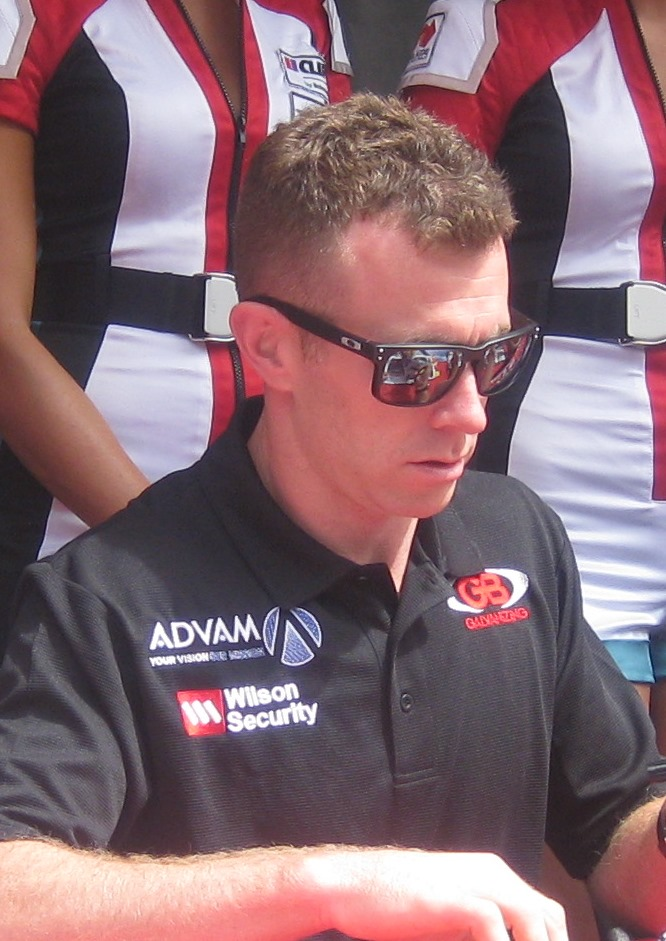
- Wood in 2014
- Nationality: Australian
- Born: Dale Ian Wood; 9 June 1983 (age 43) Melbourne, Victoria, Australia

Supercars Championship career
- Current team: Grove Racing (Endurance race co-driver)
- Championships: 0
- Races: 168
- Wins: 0
- Podiums: 1
- Pole positions: 0
- 2024 position: 46th (207 pts)

Dale Ian Wood (born 9 June 1983) is an Australian racing driver who currently co-drives for Grove Racing's No. 26 Ford Mustang in the Pirtek Enduro Cup. He currently resides in Melbourne, Victoria. He commenced his full-time V8 Supercar career in 2009 with the newly formed team Kelly Racing team, having raced previously for the Tasman Motorsport aligned Greg Murphy Racing Fujitsu series squad. Wood was replaced after the Hidden Valley round although he returned to the team for the endurance race season, pairing up with Jack Perkins. He returned to the team a year later, again in an endurance race role.

== Career ==
=== Greg Murphy Racing ===
Wood competed in the Fujitsu Development Series for Greg Murphy Racing in 2007 and 2008.

=== Kelly Racing ===
Wood was confirmed as the driver of the No. 16 Kelly Racing entry for 2009, with sponsorship from Hi-Tec Oils and Red Rooster. This car will use one of the licences owned by Kelly Racing teammate, Jack Perkins' father, Larry Perkins. Wood's No. 16 car for 2009 is the car previously run by Jack Perkins at Perkins Engineering in 2008, chassis number PE046. Oscar Fiorinotto has been named as Dale's engineer for the 2009 season.

Wood's first track appearance in his Kelly Racing Commodore was at the V8 Supercars Official Category Test Day, at Winton Raceway on 9 March 2009, where he was joined by the other three Kelly Racing entries, and all other Victorian-based V8 Supercar teams. At the test day, with the sponsorship of the car still to be confirmed, it ran in an interim testing livery, thanking the team for getting all four cars ready for the season in two months.

=== Tony D'Alberto Racing ===
In mid-2011, it was announced that Wood would compete alongside Tony D'Alberto for Phillip Island and Bathurst in their Ford Performance Racing built Falcon. Wood was also given some extra race miles at the Townsville Fujitsu Series round in a VE Commodore, as their regular Fujitsu driver, David Wall was suffering from a broken leg.

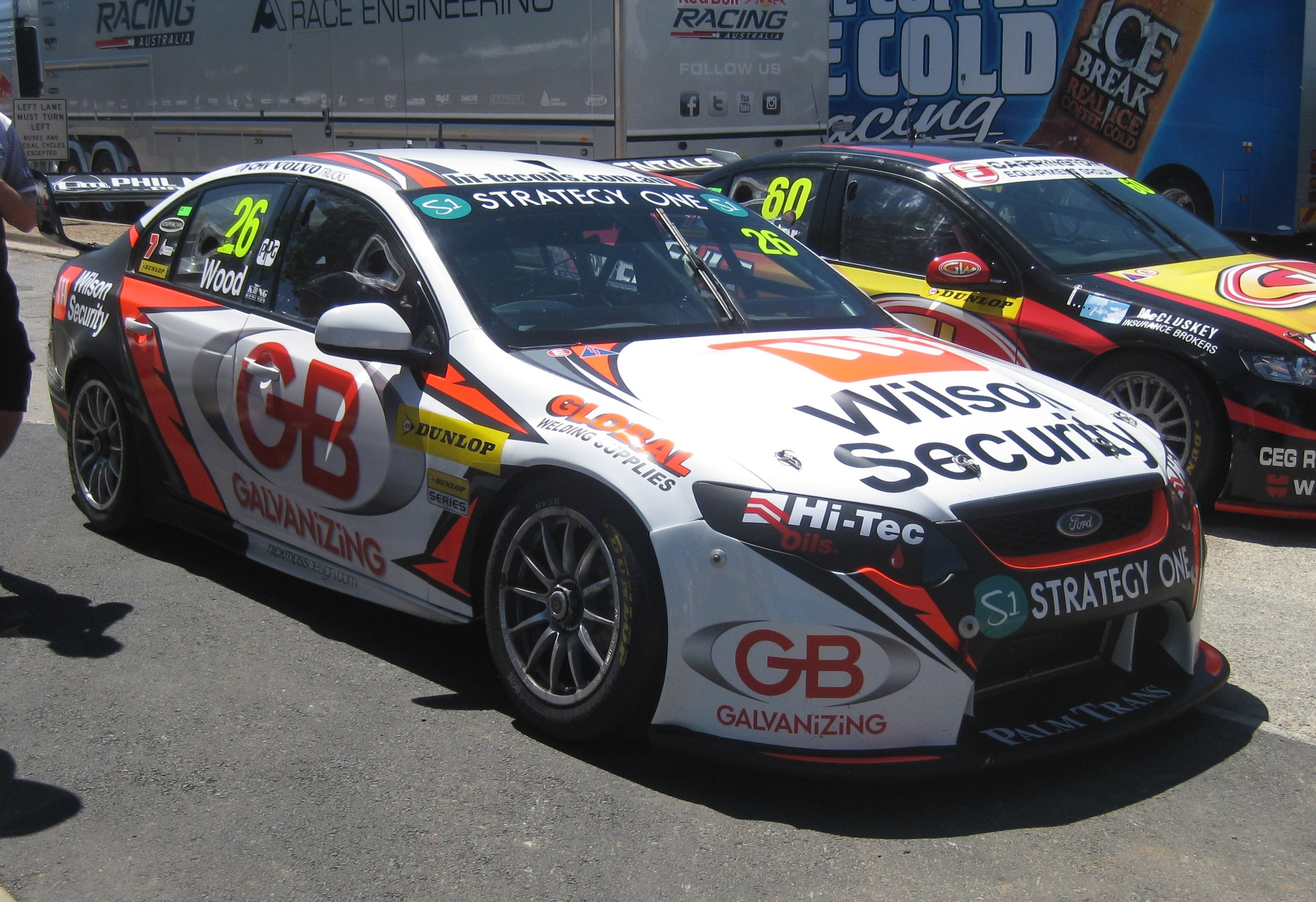
Wood's MW Motorsport Ford FG Falcon, which won the 2013 Dunlop Series

=== Britek Motorsport ===
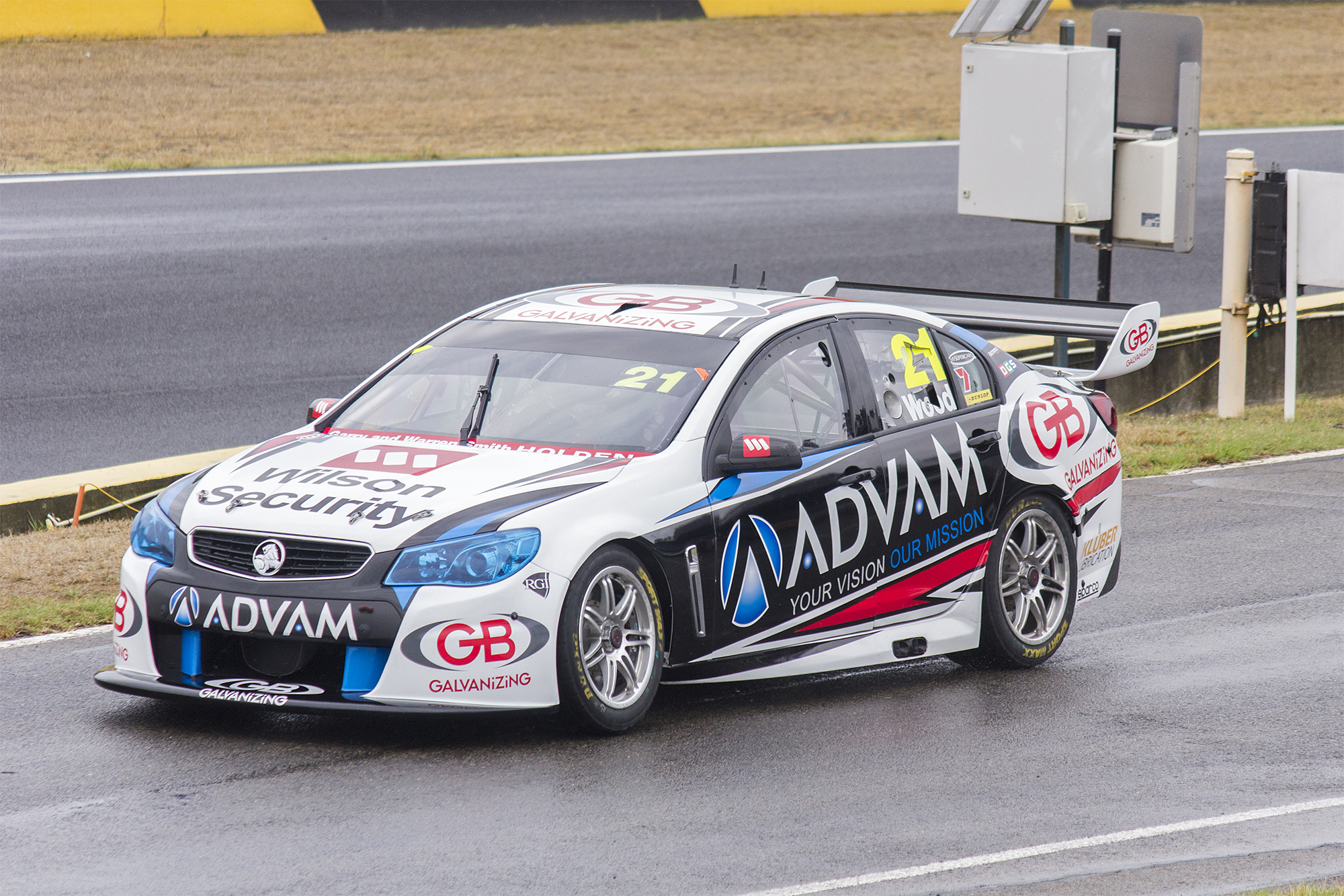
Wood placed 24th in the 2014 V8 Supercars Championship driving a Holden VF Commodore

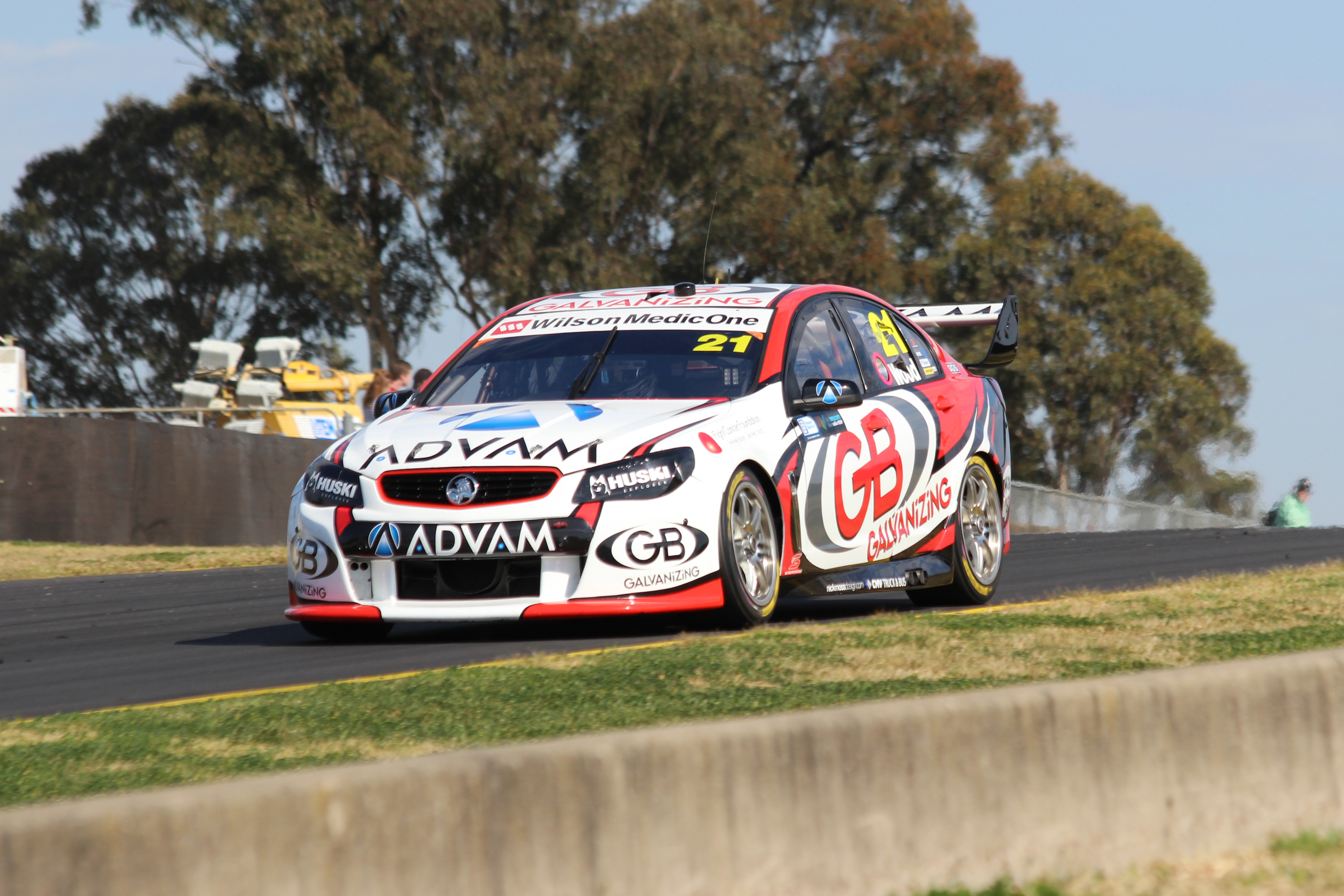
Wood at the 2015 Sydney Motorsport Park Super Sprint

Wood was contracted to drive the No. 21 Britek Motorsport Holden VF Commodore in the 2014 V8 Supercars Championship. After achieving his first Championship podium finish at Winton earlier in the year, Wood placed third in Qualifying for the 2014 Supercheap Auto Bathurst 1000. He remained with the team in 2015 V8 Supercars Championship.

=== Nissan Motorsport ===
For 2016, Wood returned to Nissan Motorsport, Having previously driven for the team in 2009 while running Holden VE Commodores. He was signed to drive the No. 96 GB Galvanising Racing Altima.

=== Erebus Motorsport ===
Wood joined Erebus Motorsport and drove the No. 99 Holden VF Commodore in the 2017 Supercars Championship.

=== Tim Blanchard Racing ===
Wood would be co-driving with Tim Blanchard in the No. 21 Holden ZB Commodore at Tim Blanchard Racing, a satellite team of Brad Jones Racing.

== Career results ==
Season	Series	Position	Car	Team
2005	New South Wales Formula Ford Championship	3rd	Mygale SJ04 Ford	G-Force Motorsport
2005	Australian Formula Ford Championship	15th	Mygale SJ04 Ford	G-Force Motorsport
2006	Australian Formula Ford Championship	6th	Van Diemen RF05 Ford	Fastlane Racing
2007	Fujitsu V8 Supercars Series	7th	Holden VZ Commodore	Greg Murphy Racing
2008	Fujitsu V8 Supercar Series	6th	Holden VZ Commodore	Greg Murphy Racing
2008	V8 Supercar Championship Series	43rd	Holden VE Commodore	Tasman Motorsport
2009	V8 Supercar Championship Series	29th	Holden VE Commodore	Kelly Racing
2010	V8 Supercar Championship Series	45th	Holden VE Commodore	Kelly Racing
2010	Australian Mini Challenge	16th	Mini Cooper S	
2011	International V8 Supercars Championship	44th	Ford FG Falcon	Tony D'Alberto Racing
2012	Dunlop V8 Supercar Series	6th	Holden VE Commodore	Greg Murphy Racing
2012	International V8 Supercars Championship	55th	Ford FG Falcon	Tony D'Alberto Racing
2013	Dunlop V8 Supercar Series	1st	Ford FG Falcon	MW Motorsport
2013	International V8 Supercars Championship	43rd	Ford FG Falcon	Dick Johnson Racing
2013	V8SuperTourers Championship	33rd	Holden VE Commodore	Angus Fogg Racing
2014	International V8 Supercars Championship	24th	Holden VF Commodore	Britek Motorsport
2015	International V8 Supercars Championship	20th	Holden VF Commodore	Britek Motorsport
2016	International V8 Supercars Championship	22nd	Nissan Altima L33	Nissan Motorsport
2017	Virgin Australia Supercars Championship	23rd	Holden VF Commodore	Erebus Motorsport
2018	Porsche Carrera Cup Australia	6th	Porsche 991 GT3 Cup	Sonic Motor Racing Services
2018	Virgin Australia Supercars Championship	45th	Holden ZB Commodore	Tim Blanchard Racing
2019	Porsche Carrera Cup Australia	2nd	Porsche 991 GT3 Cup	Sonic Motor Racing Services
2019	Virgin Australia Supercars Championship	39th	Nissan Altima L33	Kelly Racing
2020	Porsche Carrera Cup Australia	4th	Porsche 991 GT3 Cup	Sonic Motor Racing Services
2020	Virgin Australia Supercars Championship	42nd	Ford Mustang Mk.6	Kelly Racing
2021	Porsche Carrera Cup Australia	14th	Porsche 991 GT3 Cup	Ashley Seward Motorsport
2021	Virgin Australia Supercars Championship	33rd	Holden ZB Commodore	Brad Jones Racing
2022	Porsche Carrera Cup Australia	7th	Porsche 992 GT3 Cup	Ashley Seward Motorsport
2023	Porsche Carrera Cup Australia	3rd	Porsche 911 GT3 Cup 992	Porsche Centre Brighton Motorsport
2023	Virgin Australia Supercars Championship	41st	Chevrolet Camaro ZL1	Brad Jones Racing
2024	Porsche Carrera Cup Australia	5th	Porsche 911 GT3 Cup 992	Earl Bamber Motorsport
2024	Virgin Australia Supercars Championship	46th	Ford Mustang GT	Grove Racing

=== Super2 Series results ===
Super2 Series results
Year	Team	No.	Car	1	2	3	4	5	6	7	8	9	10	11	12	13	14	15	16	17	18	Position	Points
2007	Greg Murphy Racing	46	Holden VZ Commodore	ADE; R1; 4	ADE; R2; 10	WAK; R3; 14	WAK; R4; DSQ	WAK; R5; Ret	WIN; R6; 19	WIN; R7; 10	WIN; R8; 24	QLD; R9; 16	QLD; R10; 11	QLD; R11; 8	ORA; R12; 2	ORA; R13; 10	ORA; R14; 13	BAT; R15; 4	BAT; R16; 2	PHI; R17; 4	PHI; R18; 9	7th	180
2008	Greg Murphy Racing	46	Holden VZ Commodore	ADE; R1; 4	ADE; R2; 3	WAK; R3; Ret	WAK; R4; 10	WAK; R5; Ret	SAN; R6; 3	SAN; R7; 5	SAN; R8; 19	QLD; R9; 5	QLD; R10; 8	QLD; R11; 3	WIN; R12; Ret	WIN; R13; 9	WIN; R14; 5	BAT; R15; 6	BAT; R16; 5	ORA; R17; 13	ORA; R18; Ret	6th	1122
2011	Tony D'Alberto Racing	83	Holden VE Commodore	ADE; R1	ADE; R2	BAR; R3	BAR; R4	TOW; R5; Ret	TOW; R6; 12	TOW; R7; 21	QLD; R8	QLD; R9	QLD; R10	BAT; R11	BAT; R12	SAN; R13	SAN; R14	SAN; R15	SYD; R16	SYD; R17		37th	61
2012	Greg Murphy Racing	45	Holden VE Commodore	ADE; R1; 15	ADE; R2; 11	BAR; R3; 17	BAR; R4; Ret	BAR; R5; DNS	TOW; R6; 13	TOW; R7; 17	TOW; R8; 8	QLD; R9; 7	QLD; R10; 6	QLD; R11; 6	BAT; R12; 4	BAT; R13; 5	WIN; R14; 6	WIN; R15; 1	WIN; R16; 3	SYD; R17; 3	SYD; R18; 4	6th	1245
2013	MW Motorsport	26	Ford FG Falcon	ADE; R1; 3	ADE; R2; 2	BAR; R3; 2	BAR; R4; 7	BAR; R5; 1	TOW; R6; 2	TOW; R7; 4	TOW; R8; 2	QLD; R9; 1	QLD; R10; 8	QLD; R11; 7	WIN; R12; 1	WIN; R13; 5	WIN; R14; 2	BAT; R15; 2	BAT; R16; 2	SYD; R17; 9	SYD; R18; 6	1st	1772

=== Supercars Championship results ===
Supercars results
Year	Team	No.	Car	1	2	3	4	5	6	7	8	9	10	11	12	13	14	15	16	17	18	19	20	21	22	23	24	25	26	27	28	29	30	31	32	33	34	35	36	37	38	39	Position	Points
2008	Tasman Motorsport	51	Holden VE Commodore	ADE; R1	ADE; R2	EAS; R3	EAS; R4	EAS; R5	HAM; R6	HAM; R7	HAM; R8	BAR; R9	BAR; R10	BAR; R11	SAN; R12	SAN; R13	SAN; R14	HDV; R15	HDV; R16	HDV; R17	QLD; R18	QLD; R19	QLD; R20	WIN; R21	WIN; R22	WIN; R23	PHI; QR; 24	PHI; R24; 20	BAT; R25; 13	SUR; R26	SUR; R27	SUR; R28	BHR; R29	BHR; R30	BHR; R31	SYM; R32	SYM; R33	SYM; R34	ORA; R35	ORA; R36	ORA; R37		42nd	226
2009	Kelly Racing	16	Holden VE Commodore	ADE; R1; 14	ADE; R2; Ret	HAM; R3; 22	HAM; R4; 16	WIN; R5; 24	WIN; R6; 18	SYM; R7; 28	SYM; R8; Ret	HDV; R9; 25	HDV; R10; 22	TOW; R11	TOW; R12	SAN; R13	SAN; R14	QLD; R15	QLD; R16																								29th	578
2009	Kelly Racing	11	Holden VE Commodore																	PHI; QR; 23	PHI; R17; 19	BAT; R18; 14	SUR; R19	SUR; R20	SUR; R21	SUR; R22	PHI; R23	PHI; R24	BAR; R25	BAR; R26	SYD; R27	SYD; R28											29th	578
2010	Kelly Racing	7	Holden VE Commodore	YMC; R1	YMC; R2	BHR; R3	BHR; R4	ADE; R5	ADE; R6	HAM; R7	HAM; R8	QLD; R9	QLD; R10	WIN; R11	WIN; R12	HDV; R13	HDV; R14	TOW; R15	TOW; R16	PHI; QR; 25	PHI; R17; 18	BAT; R18; 20																					45th	253
2010	Kelly Racing	16	Holden VE Commodore																				SUR; R19; Ret	SUR; R20; 18	SYM; R21	SYM; R22	SAN; R23	SAN; R24	SYD; R25	SYD; R26													45th	253
2011	Tony D'Alberto Racing	3	Ford FG Falcon	YMC; R1	YMC; R2	ADE; R3	ADE; R4	HAM; R5	HAM; R6	BAR; R7	BAR; R8	BAR; R9	WIN; R10	WIN; R11	HID; R12	HID; R13	TOW; R14	TOW; R15	QLD; R16	QLD; R17	QLD; R18	PHI; QR; 9	PHI; R19; 21	BAT; R20; 9	SUR; R21	SUR; R22	SYM; R23	SYM; R24	SAN; R25	SAN; R26	SYD; R27	SYD; R28											44th	236
2012	Tony D'Alberto Racing	3	Ford FG Falcon	ADE; R1	ADE; R2	SYM; R3	SYM; R4	HAM; R5	HAM; R6	BAR; R7	BAR; R8	BAR; R9	PHI; R10	PHI; R11	HID; R12	HID; R13	TOW; R14	TOW; R15	QLD; R16	QLD; R17	SMP; R18	SMP; R19	SAN; QR; 16	SAN; R20; 23	BAT; R21; Ret	SUR; R22	SUR; R23	YMC; R24	YMC; R25	YMC; R26	WIN; R27	WIN; R28	SYD; R29	SYD; R30									55th	88
2013	Dick Johnson Racing	12	Ford FG Falcon	ADE; R1	ADE; R2	SYM; R3	SYM; R4	SYM; R5	PUK; R6	PUK; R7	PUK; R8	PUK; R9	BAR; R10	BAR; R11	BAR; R12	COA; R13	COA; R14	COA; R15	COA; R16	HID; R17	HID; R18	HID; R19	TOW; R20	TOW; R21	QLD; R22	QLD; R23	QLD; R24	WIN; R25	WIN; R26	WIN; R27	SAN; QR; 3	SAN; R28; 14	BAT; R29; 21	SUR; R30; 9	SUR; R31; 11	PHI; R32	PHI; R33	PHI; R34	SYD; R35	SYD; R36			43rd	366
2014	Britek Motorsport	21	Holden VF Commodore	ADE; R1; 23	ADE; R2; 24	ADE; R3; 10	SYM; R4; 19	SYM; R5; 22	SYM; R6; 24	WIN; R7; 3	WIN; R8; 13	WIN; R9; 25	PUK; R10; 23	PUK; R11; 21	PUK; R12; 20	PUK; R13; 22	BAR; R14; 16	BAR; R15; 23	BAR; R16; 19	HID; R17; 21	HID; R18; 17	HID; R19; 11	TOW; R20; 20	TOW; R21; 23	TOW; R22; Ret	QLD; R23; 22	QLD; R24; 23	QLD; R25; 20	SMP; R26; 17	SMP; R27; 18	SMP; R28; 16	SAN; QR; 25	SAN; R29; 19	BAT; R30; Ret	SUR; R31; 14	SUR; R32; Ret	PHI; R33; 22	PHI; R34; 21	PHI; R35; 19	SYD; R36; 21	SYD; R37; 16	SYD; R38; 24	24th	1169
2015	Britek Motorsport	21	Holden VF Commodore	ADE; R1; 22	ADE; R2; 18	ADE; R3; 13	SYM; R4; 13	SYM; R5; 24	SYM; R6; 15	BAR; R7; 24	BAR; R8; 19	BAR; R9; 11	WIN; R10; 24	WIN; R11; 17	WIN; R12; 21	HID; R13; 8	HID; R14; 22	HID; R15; 10	TOW; R16; 24	TOW; R17; 18	QLD; R18; 21	QLD; R19; 20	QLD; R20; 24	SMP; R21; 24	SMP; R22; 21	SMP; R23; 22	SAN; QR; 13	SAN; R24; 20	BAT; R25; 15	SUR; R26; 11	SUR; R27; 20	PUK; R28; 21	PUK; R29; 19	PUK; R30; 19	PHI; R31; 18	PHI; R32; 20	PHI; R33; 24	SYD; R34; 14	SYD; R35; 13	SYD; R36; 22			20th	1325
2016	Nissan Motorsport	96	Nissan Altima L33	ADE; R1; 20	ADE; R2; 18	ADE; R3; Ret	SYM; R4; 22	SYM; R5; 20	PHI; R6; 20	PHI; R7; 18	BAR; R8; 18	BAR; R9; 20	WIN; R10; 14	WIN; R11; 14	HID; R12; 20	HID; R13; 18	TOW; R14; 23	TOW; R15; 18	QLD; R16; 17	QLD; R17; 19	SMP; R18; 15	SMP; R19; 21	SAN; QR; 20	SAN; R20; 18	BAT; R21; 9	SUR; R22; 7	SUR; R23; 22	PUK; R24; Ret	PUK; R25; 21	PUK; R26; 21	PUK; R27; 18	SYD; R28; Ret	SYD; R29; Ret										22nd	1273
2017	Erebus Motorsport	99	Holden VF Commodore	ADE; R1; Ret	ADE; R2; 20	SYM; R3; 8	SYM; R4; 14	PHI; R5; Ret	PHI; R6; 8	BAR; R7; 21	BAR; R8; 21	WIN; R9; 21	WIN; R10; 26	HID; R11; 25	HID; R12; 22	TOW; R13; 16	TOW; R14; 22	QLD; R15; 23	QLD; R16; Ret	SMP; R17; 16	SMP; R18; 22	SAN; QR; 7	SAN; R19; 13	BAT; R20; 4	SUR; R21; 22	SUR; R22; 18	PUK; R23; 20	PUK; R24; 20	NEW; R25; 18	NEW; R26; 20													23rd	1221
2018	Tim Blanchard Racing	21	Holden ZB Commodore	ADE; R1	ADE; R2	MEL; R3	MEL; R4	MEL; R5	MEL; R6	SYM; R7	SYM; R8	PHI; R9	PHI; R10	BAR; R11	BAR; R12	WIN; R13	WIN; R14	HID; R15	HID; R16	TOW; R17	TOW; R18	QLD; R19; PO	QLD; R20; PO	SMP; R21	BEN; R22	BEN; R23	SAN; QR; 9	SAN; R24; 19	BAT; R25; 18	SUR; R26; 17	SUR; R27; C	PUK; R28	PUK; R29	NEW; R30	NEW; R31								45th	421
2019	Kelly Racing	15	Nissan Altima L33	ADE; R1	ADE; R2	MEL; R3	MEL; R4	MEL; R5	MEL; R6	SYM; R7	SYM; R8	PHI; R9	PHI; R10	BAR; R11	BAR; R12	WIN; R13; PO	WIN; R14; PO	HID; R15	HID; R16	TOW; R17	TOW; R18	QLD; R19	QLD; R20	BEN; R21; PO	BEN; R22; PO	PUK; R23	PUK; R24	BAT; R25; 8	SUR; R26; 10	SUR; R27; 14	SAN; QR; 14	SAN; R28; 22	NEW; R29	NEW; R30									39th	407
2020	Kelly Racing	15	Ford Mustang S550	ADE; R1	ADE; R2	MEL; R3	MEL; R4	MEL; R5	MEL; R6	SMP1; R7	SMP1; R8	SMP1; R9	SMP2; R10	SMP2; R11	SMP2; R12	HID1; R13	HID1; R14	HID1; R15	HID2; R16	HID2; R17	HID2; R18	TOW1; R19	TOW1; R20	TOW1; R21	TOW2; R22	TOW2; R23	TOW2; R24	BEN1; R25	BEN1; R26	BEN1; R27	BEN2; R28	BEN2; R29	BEN2; R30	BAT; R31; 17									42nd	108
2021	Brad Jones Racing	8	Holden Commodore ZB	BAT1; R1	BAT1; R2	SAN; R3	SAN; R4	SAN; R5	SYM; R6	SYM; R7	SYM; R8	BEN; R9	BEN; R10	BEN; R11	HID; R12	HID; R13	HID; R14	TOW1; R15	TOW1; R16	TOW2; R17	TOW2; R18	TOW2; R19	SMP1; R20	SMP1; R21	SMP1; R22	SMP2; R23	SMP2; R24	SMP2; R25	SMP3; R26	SMP3; R27	SMP3; R28	SMP4; R29	SMP4; R30	BAT2; R31; 6									33rd	204
2022	Brad Jones Racing	8	Holden Commodore ZB	SMP; R1	SMP; R2	SYM; R3	SYM; R4	SYM; R5	MEL; R6	MEL; R7	MEL; R8	MEL; R9	BAR; R10	BAR; R11	BAR; R12	WIN; R13	WIN; R14	WIN; R15	HID; R16	HID; R17	HID; R18	TOW; R19	TOW; R20	BEN; R21	BEN; R22	BEN; R23	SAN; R24	SAN; R25	SAN; R26	PUK; R27	PUK; R28	PUK; R29	BAT; R30; Ret	SUR; R31	SUR; R32	NEW; R33	NEW; R34						NC	-
2023	Brad Jones Racing	8	Chevrolet Camaro ZL1	NEW; R1	NEW; R2	MEL; R3	MEL; R4	MEL; R5	MEL; R6	BAR; R7	BAR; R8	BAR; R9	SYM; R10	SYM; R11	SYM; R12	HID; R13	HID; R14	HID; R15	TOW; R16	TOW; R17	SMP; R18	SMP; R19	BEN; R20	BEN; R21	BEN; R22	SAN; R23; 5	BAT; R24; Ret	SUR; R25	SUR; R26	ADE; R27	ADE; R28												42nd	222
2024	Grove Racing	26	Ford Mustang S650	BAT1; R1	BAT1; R2	MEL; R3	MEL; R4	MEL; R5	MEL; R6	TAU; R7	TAU; R8	BAR; R9	BAR; R10	HID; R11	HID; R12	TOW; R13	TOW; R14	SMP; R15	SMP; R16	BEN; R17	BEN; R18	SAN; R19; Ret	BAT; R20; 9	SUR; R21	SUR; R22	ADE; R23; 23	ADE; R24																48th	180
2025	Grove Racing	26	Ford Mustang S650	SYD; R1	SYD; R2	SYD; R3	MEL; R4	MEL; R5	MEL; R6	MEL; R7	TAU; R8	TAU; R9	TAU; R10	SYM; R11	SYM; R12	SYM; R13	BAR; R14	BAR; R15	BAR; R16	HID; R17	HID; R18	HID; R19	TOW; R20	TOW; R21	TOW; R22	QLD; R23	QLD; R24	QLD; R25	BEN; R26; 15	BAT; R27; 8	SUR; R28	SUR; R29	SAN; R30	SAN; R31	ADE; R32	ADE; R33	ADE; R34						41st*	93*

=== Bathurst 1000 results ===
Year	Team	Car	Co-driver	Position	Laps
2008	Tasman Motorsport	Holden Commodore VE	(Australia) Mark Noske	13th	160
2009	Kelly Racing	Holden Commodore VE	(Australia) Jack Perkins	14th	160
2010	Kelly Racing	Holden Commodore VE	(Australia) Todd Kelly	20th	160
2011	Tony D'Alberto Racing	Ford Falcon FG	(Australia) Tony D'Alberto	9th	161
2012	Tony D'Alberto Racing	Ford Falcon FG	(Australia) Tony D'Alberto	DNF	122
2013	Dick Johnson Racing	Ford Falcon FG	(Australia) Chaz Mostert	21st	156
2014	Britek Motorsport	Holden Commodore VF	(New Zealand) Chris Pither	DNF	45
2015	Britek Motorsport	Holden Commodore VF	(Australia) Macauley Jones	15th	161
2016	Nissan Motorsport	Nissan Altima L33	(Australia) David Russell	9th	161
2017	Erebus Motorsport	Holden Commodore VF	(New Zealand) Chris Pither	4th	161
2018	Tim Blanchard Racing	Holden Commodore ZB	(Australia) Tim Blanchard	18th	159
2019	Kelly Racing	Nissan Altima L33	(Australia) Rick Kelly	8th	161
2020	Kelly Racing	Ford Mustang S550	(Australia) Rick Kelly	17th	144
2021	Brad Jones Racing	Holden Commodore ZB	(Australia) Nick Percat	6th	161
2022	Brad Jones Racing	Holden Commodore ZB	(New Zealand) Andre Heimgartner	DNF	4
2023	Brad Jones Racing	Chevrolet Camaro Mk.6	(New Zealand) Andre Heimgartner	DNF	68
2024	Grove Racing	Ford Mustang S650	(New Zealand) Richie Stanaway	9th	161
2025	Grove Racing	Ford Mustang S650	(Australia) Kai Allen	8th	161

=== Carerra Cup Australia results ===
Year	Team	Car	1	2	3	4	5	6	7	8	9	10	11	12	13	14	15	16	17	18	19	20	21	22	23	24	25	26	Position	Points
2018	Sonic Motor Racing Services	Porsche 911 GT3 Cup	ADE; R1; 1	ADE; R2; 7	ADE; R3; 6	MEL; R4; 1	MEL; R5; 1	MEL; R6; 1	MEL; R7; 10	PHI; R8; 1	PHI; R9; 1	HID; R10; 5	HID; R11; Ret	HID; R12; 6	SMP; R13; Ret	SMP; R14; 11	BEN; R15; 3	BEN; R16; 6	BEN; R17; 1	BAT; R18; Ret	BAT; R19; Ret	BAT; R20; Ret	SUR; R21; 5	SUR; R22; 6	SUR; R23; 5				6th	802
2019	Sonic Motor Racing Services	Porsche 911 GT3 Cup	ADE; R1; 3	ADE; R2; 3	ADE; R3; 3	MEL; R4; 1	MEL; R5; 1	MEL; R6; 2	MEL; R7; 2	PHI; R8; 2	PHI; R9; 2	PHI; R10; 2	HID; R11; 3	HID; R12; 1	HID; R13; 2	TOW; R14; 4	TOW; R15; 4	TOW; R16; 2	BEN; R17; 21	BEN; R18; 8	BEN; R19; 6	BAT; R20; 5	BAT; R21; 7	BAT; R22; 7	SUR; R23; 4	SUR; R24; 7	SUR; R25; 7		2nd	1029
2020	Sonic Motor Racing Services	Porsche 911 GT3 Cup	ADE; R1; 7	ADE; R2; 4	ADE; R3; 3	MEL; R4; 8	MEL; R5; C	MEL; R6; C	MEL; R7; C																				5th	140
2021	Ashley Seward Motorsport	Porsche 911 GT3 Cup	SAN; R1; 5	SAN; R2; 23	SAN; R3; 4	BEN; R4; Ret	BEN; R5; 8	BEN; R6; 14	TOW; R7; Ret	TOW; R8; 8	TOW; R9; 6	BAT; R10; 13	BAT; R11; 11	BAT; R12; Ret	BAT; R13; 13														13th	198
2022	Earl Bamber Motorsport	Porsche 992 GT3 Cup	ALB; R1; 9	ALB; R2; Ret	ALB; R3; 14	ALB; R4; 7	WIN; R5; 5	WIN; R6; 4	WIN; R7; 3	HID; R8; 2	HID; R9; 1	HID; R10; 1	TOW; R11; Ret	TOW; R12; 15	TOW; R13; 14	BEN; R14; 10	BEN; R15; 13	BEN; R16; 11	SAN; R17; 6	SAN; R18; 24	SAN; R19; 9	BAT; R20; 5	BAT; R21; C	BAT; R22; C	SUR; R23; 3	SUR; R24; Ret	SUR; R25; Ret		7th	568
2023	Earl Bamber Motorsport	Porsche 992 GT3 Cup	ALB; R1; C	ALB; R2; 5	ALB; R3; 4	HID; R4; 1	HID; R5; 1	HID; R6; 1	TOW; R7; 14	TOW; R8; 14	TOW; R9; 14	BEN; R10; 7	BEN; R11; 8	BEN; R12; 8	SAN; R13; 5	SAN; R14; 4	SAN; R15; 3	BAT; R16; 8	BAT; R17; 20	BAT; R18; 18	SUR; R19; Ret	SUR; R20; 8	SUR; R21; 13	ADE; R22; 1	ADE; R23; 1	ADE; R24; 1			3rd	757
2024	Earl Bamber Motorsport	Porsche 992 GT3 Cup	ALB; R1; 3	ALB; R2; 2	ALB; R3; 6	TAU; R4; 14	TAU; R5; 4	TAU; R6; 6	HID; R7; 3	HID; R8; 2	HID; R9; 2	SMP; R10; Ret	SMP; R11; 7	SMP; R12; 16	SAN; R13; 8	SAN; R14; 20	SAN; R15; 9	BAT; R16; 3	BAT; R17; 3	BAT; R18; 2	SUR; R19; 4	SUR; R20; 5	SUR; R21; Ret	ADE; R22; 1	ADE; R23; 2	ADE; R24; 1			6th	858
2025	Earl Bamber Motorsport	Porsche 992 GT3 Cup	SMP; R1; 5	SMP; R2; 6	SMP; R3; 6	ALB; R4; 14	ALB; R5; 13	ALB; R6; 7	HID; R7	HID; R8	HID; R9	QLD; R10	QLD; R11	QLD; R12	BEN; R13	BEN; R14	BEN; R15	BAT; R16	BAT; R17	BAT; R18	SUR; R19	SUR; R20	SUR; R21	ADE; R22	ADE; R23	ADE; R24			7th*	155*

Sporting positions
Preceded by Scott McLaughlin	Winner of the Dunlop V8 Supercar Series; 2013	Succeeded by Paul Dumbrell
Awards and achievements
Preceded by James Courtney	Mike Kable Young Gun Award; 2007	Succeeded by Karl Reindler
