= 2019 Townsville 400 =

2019 V8 Supercar championship race

(Queensland) 2019 Townsville 400
Event Information
- Round 8 of 15 in the 2019 Supercars Championship
- Date: 5-7 July 2019
- Location: Townsville, Queensland
- Venue: Townsville Street Circuit

Results
Race 1
Distance	70 laps	200.524 km
Pole position	(Australia) David Reynolds; Erebus Motorsport	1:12.1059
Winner	(New Zealand) Scott McLaughlin; DJR Team Penske	1:28:55.7924
Race 2
Distance	64 laps	182.400 km
Pole position	(Australia) Cam Waters; Tickford Racing	1:12.4869
Winner	(New Zealand) Shane van Gisbergen; Triple Eight Race Engineering	1:37:33.2942

The 2019 Townsville 400 (formally known as 2019 Watpac Townsville 400) was a motor racing event for the Supercars Championship, held on the weekend of 5-7 July 2019. The event was held at Townsville Street Circuit near Townsville, Queensland and consisted of two races, both 200 kilometres in length. It was the eighth event of fifteen in the 2019 Supercars Championship and hosted Races 17 and 18 of the season.

Race 17 was won by Scott McLaughlin, while Shane van Gisbergen won Race 18. David Reynolds and Cam Waters claimed pole positions at the event.

== Report ==
=== Background ===
==== Entry alterations ====
Michael Caruso returned to Garry Rogers Motorsport to replace the injured Richie Stanaway, following Chris Pither's entries at the Winton SuperSprint and Darwin Triple Crown. The event marked Caruso's first event in the category since the 2018 Newcastle 500.
