= Winton SuperSprint =

Annual motor racing event

(Victoria (state)) Winton SuperSprint

- Race Information
Venue	Winton Motor Raceway
Number of times held	33
First held	1985
Last held	2022
- Race Format
- Race 1
Laps	36
Distance	110 km
- Race 2
Laps	36
Distance	110 km
- Race 3
Laps	36
Distance	110 km
- Last Event (2022)
- Overall Winner
(Australia) Cam Waters	Tickford Racing
- Race Winners
(Australia) Cam Waters	Tickford Racing
(New Zealand) Shane van Gisbergen	Triple Eight Race Engineering
(Australia) Cam Waters	Tickford Racing

The Winton SuperSprint was an annual motor racing event for Supercars, held at Winton Motor Raceway in Winton, Victoria. The event has been a regular part of the Supercars Championship—and its previous incarnations, the Australian Touring Car Championship, Shell Championship Series and V8 Supercars Championship—between 1985 and 2022.

The event was not held in 2020 and 2021 due to the COVID-19 pandemic, but returned in 2022 before being omitted again from the 2023 calendar.

== Format ==
The event was staged over a two-day weekend, from Saturday to Sunday. Saturday featured two thirty-minute practice sessions, then a three-stage knockout qualifying session which decided the grid positions for the following 110 kilometre race. Two separated ten-minute qualifying sessions were held on Sunday, which decided the grid for the following 110 km races.

== History ==
Jim Richards won the first two Australian Touring Car Championship (ATCC) events at Winton in 1985 and 1986. The 1985 event marked the only time in the history of the ATCC that a Holden did not compete in the race. Richards won the race by a lap over his teammate Neville Crichton, both in BMW 635CSis, while Kevin Bartlett finished third in a Mitsubishi Starion. Richards' 1986 win came only after the Nissan Skyline of Gary Scott was excluded for using oversized front brake caliper pistons. Nissan would go on to dominate the event, winning every year from 1989 to 1992. George Fury's win in 1989 ended a fifteen-race winning streak by the Ford Sierra RS500, which had won every ATCC race in 1988 and the first six races of 1989. The race was run in wet conditions and featured various leaders, including Peter Brock in a Sierra, Fury and Mark Skaife in Skylines and Allan Grice in a Holden Commodore. Brock finished in second despite a spin while Skaife took his first ATCC podium finish.

The circuit was extended in 1997 and Larry Perkins took his first and only ATCC pole position at that year's event. His teammate Russell Ingall won all three races during the weekend to take overall victory ahead of Perkins and Glenn Seton. In the second race of the 2000 round, Seton took his final career race victory, and was leading the third race until a sudden chain of events saw Seton and four other drivers in the leading pack have incidents in the space of two corners. Eventually Jason Bargwanna held off Paul Radisich in the closest race finish in the event's history, and in doing so won his second consecutive Winton round. In the 2003 event, Greg Murphy was given a controversial drive-through penalty. Craig Lowndes lost the rear of his car going through the fast turn five and, as he applied the brakes to try to regain control, was hit by Murphy. The penalty was criticised by television commentator Neil Crompton and Lowndes said that Murphy "had been treated harshly".

There was more controversy in 2004, when Cameron McConville passed Rick Kelly for the lead at the penultimate corner on the final lap. Brad Jones' car was stopped on the straight before the corner, with yellow flags being displayed and passing being disallowed as a result. Kelly was animated after the race, claiming that McConville had passed him in the yellow flag zone, but it was found that the pass had been made just as the two cars left the yellow flag zone and McConville kept the victory. The race dropped from the calendar in 2005 and would only return in 2006 as a late replacement for the cancelled V8 Supercars China Round. In wet conditions in 2007, Jamie Whincup moved from 20th on the grid to win the first race of the weekend, going on to win the round and breaking the then-record for the lowest starting position to win a round. The 2009 event saw the introduction of the Dunlop soft tyre, the first time that the tyre company had provided two different slick tyre compounds since becoming the control tyre supplier in 2002.

The 2013 and 2014 events saw some success for Mercedes-Benz, Nissan and Volvo, the manufacturers which had entered the series under, what was then known as, the Car of the Future V8 Supercar rules in those two seasons. Trialling a new blend of fuel, James Moffat, driving a Kelly Racing Nissan Altima L33, took his first career victory in the first race of the 2013 event, while Lee Holdsworth gave Mercedes-Benz its first Supercars race win in the second race of the 2014 event. Scott McLaughin took his first career pole position driving a Volvo S60 in 2014. Chaz Mostert crashed out of a comfortable lead in the 2015 event, gifting team-mate Mark Winterbottom with victory. In 2016, Tim Slade took his first two career race wins to win the event, also giving local team Brad Jones Racing their first event win at the circuit. In 2018, Rick Kelly won the Saturday race only days after Nissan announced they would be withdrawing their factory support of both Kelly Racing and the championship at the end of the season. The 2020 event was postponed three weeks before being held due to the COVID-19 pandemic, and was later cancelled altogether. Its date was replaced by an additional event at Sydney Motorsport Park. The 2021 event was then postponed only two days prior to the event after another COVID-19 outbreak in Victoria, before later being once again cancelled altogether.

== Winners ==
The original 'Club' layout used from 1985 to 1995.

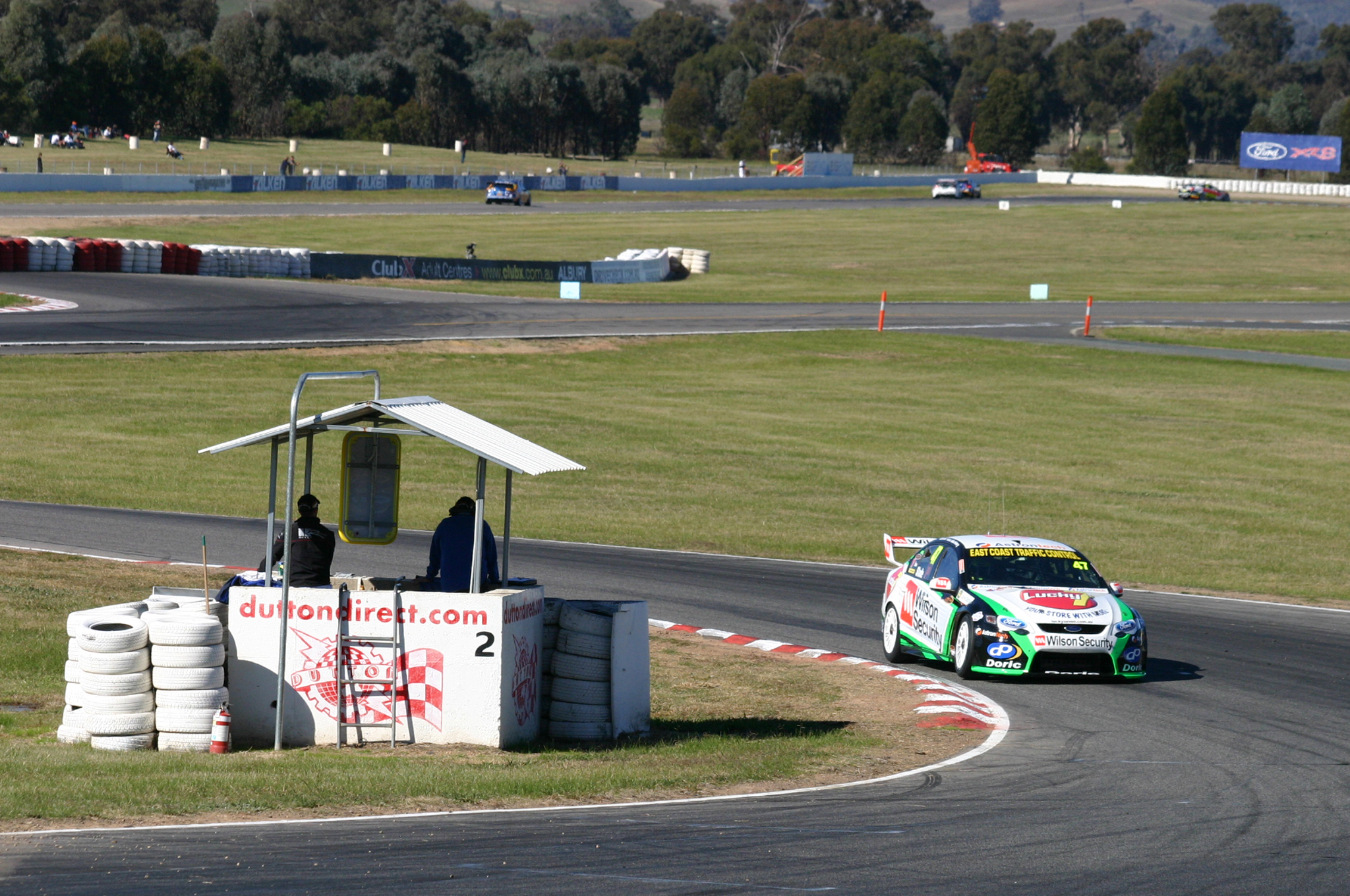
Tim Slade during practice for the 2010 event.

Year	Driver	Team	Car	Report
1985	(New Zealand) Jim Richards	JPS Team BMW	BMW 635CSi	
1986	(New Zealand) Jim Richards	JPS Team BMW	BMW 635CSi	
1987	not held			
1988	(Australia) John Bowe	Dick Johnson Racing	Ford Sierra RS500	
1989	(Australia) George Fury	Gibson Motorsport	Nissan Skyline HR31 GTS-R	
1990	(New Zealand) Jim Richards	Gibson Motorsport	Nissan Skyline HR31 GTS-R	
1991	(New Zealand) Jim Richards	Gibson Motorsport	Nissan Skyline R32 GT-R	
1992	(Australia) Mark Skaife	Gibson Motorsport	Nissan Skyline R32 GT-R	
1993	(Australia) Glenn Seton	Glenn Seton Racing	Ford EB Falcon	
1994	(Australia) Glenn Seton	Glenn Seton Racing	Ford EB Falcon	Report
1995	(Australia) John Bowe	Dick Johnson Racing	Ford EF Falcon	
1996	not held			
1997	(Australia) Russell Ingall	Perkins Engineering	Holden VS Commodore	
1998	(Australia) John Bowe	Dick Johnson Racing	Ford EL Falcon	
1999	(Australia) Jason Bargwanna	Garry Rogers Motorsport	Holden VT Commodore	
2000	(Australia) Jason Bargwanna	Garry Rogers Motorsport	Holden VT Commodore	
2001	(Australia) Russell Ingall	Perkins Engineering	Holden VX Commodore	Report
2002	(Australia) Jason Bright	Holden Racing Team	Holden VX Commodore	
2003	(Australia) Marcos Ambrose	Stone Brothers Racing	Ford BA Falcon	
2004	(Australia) Cameron McConville	Garry Rogers Motorsport	Holden VY Commodore	
2005	not held			
2006	(Australia) Craig Lowndes	Triple Eight Race Engineering	Ford BA Falcon	Report
2007	(Australia) Jamie Whincup	Triple Eight Race Engineering	Ford BF Falcon	Report
2008	(Australia) Garth Tander	Holden Racing Team	Holden VE Commodore	Report
2009	(Australia) Craig Lowndes	Triple Eight Race Engineering	Ford FG Falcon	Report
2010	(Australia) James Courtney	Dick Johnson Racing	Ford FG Falcon	Report
2011	(Australia) Jamie Whincup	Triple Eight Race Engineering	Holden VE Commodore	Report
2012	(Australia) Craig Lowndes	Triple Eight Race Engineering	Holden VE Commodore	Report
2013	(Australia) James Courtney	Holden Racing Team	Holden VF Commodore	
2014	(Australia) Mark Winterbottom	Ford Performance Racing	Ford FG Falcon	Report
2015	(Australia) Mark Winterbottom	Prodrive Racing Australia	Ford FG X Falcon	Report
2016	(Australia) Tim Slade	Brad Jones Racing	Holden VF Commodore	Report
2017	(Australia) Jamie Whincup	Triple Eight Race Engineering	Holden VF Commodore	Report
2018	(New Zealand) Fabian Coulthard	DJR Team Penske	Ford FG X Falcon	Report
2019	(New Zealand) Scott McLaughlin	DJR Team Penske	Ford Mustang GT	Report
2020 – 2021	not held due to COVID-19 pandemic			
2022	(Australia) Cam Waters	Tickford Racing	Ford Mustang GT	Report

== Multiple winners ==
=== By driver ===
Wins	Driver	Years
4	(New Zealand) Jim Richards	1985, 1986, 1990, 1991
3	(Australia) John Bowe	1988, 1995, 1998
3	(Australia) Craig Lowndes	2006, 2009, 2012
3	(Australia) Jamie Whincup	2007, 2011, 2017
2	(Australia) Glenn Seton	1993, 1994
2	(Australia) Jason Bargwanna	1999, 2000
2	(Australia) Russell Ingall	1997, 2001
2	(Australia) James Courtney	2010, 2013
2	(Australia) Mark Winterbottom	2014, 2015

=== By team ===
Wins	Team
6	Triple Eight Race Engineering
6	DJR Team Penske^{1}
4	Gibson Motorsport
3	Garry Rogers Motorsport
3	Holden Racing Team
3	Tickford Racing^{2}
2	JPS Team BMW
2	Glenn Seton Racing
2	Perkins Engineering

=== By manufacturer ===
Wins	Manufacturer
15	Ford
12	Holden
4	Nissan
2	BMW

Notes

- ^1 – DJR Team Penske was known as Dick Johnson Racing from 1980 to 2014, hence their statistics are combined.
- ^2 – Tickford Racing was known as Ford Performance Racing from 2003 to 2014 and as Prodrive Racing Australia from 2015 to 2017, hence their statistics are combined.

== Event names and sponsors ==
- 1985, 1988–95, 1997–2004, 2006–10, 2012: Winton
- 1986: Lusty-Allison Winton Roundup
- 2011: Winton 300
- 2013: Winton 360
- 2014: Winton 400
- 2015: NP300 Navara Winton Super Sprint
- 2016: Woodstock Winton SuperSprint
- 2017–18: Winton SuperSprint
- 2019: Truck Assist Winton SuperSprint
- 2022: Pizza Hut Winton SuperSprint

== See also ==
- List of Australian Touring Car Championship races
