= 2019 Supercars Championship =

Motor racing competition

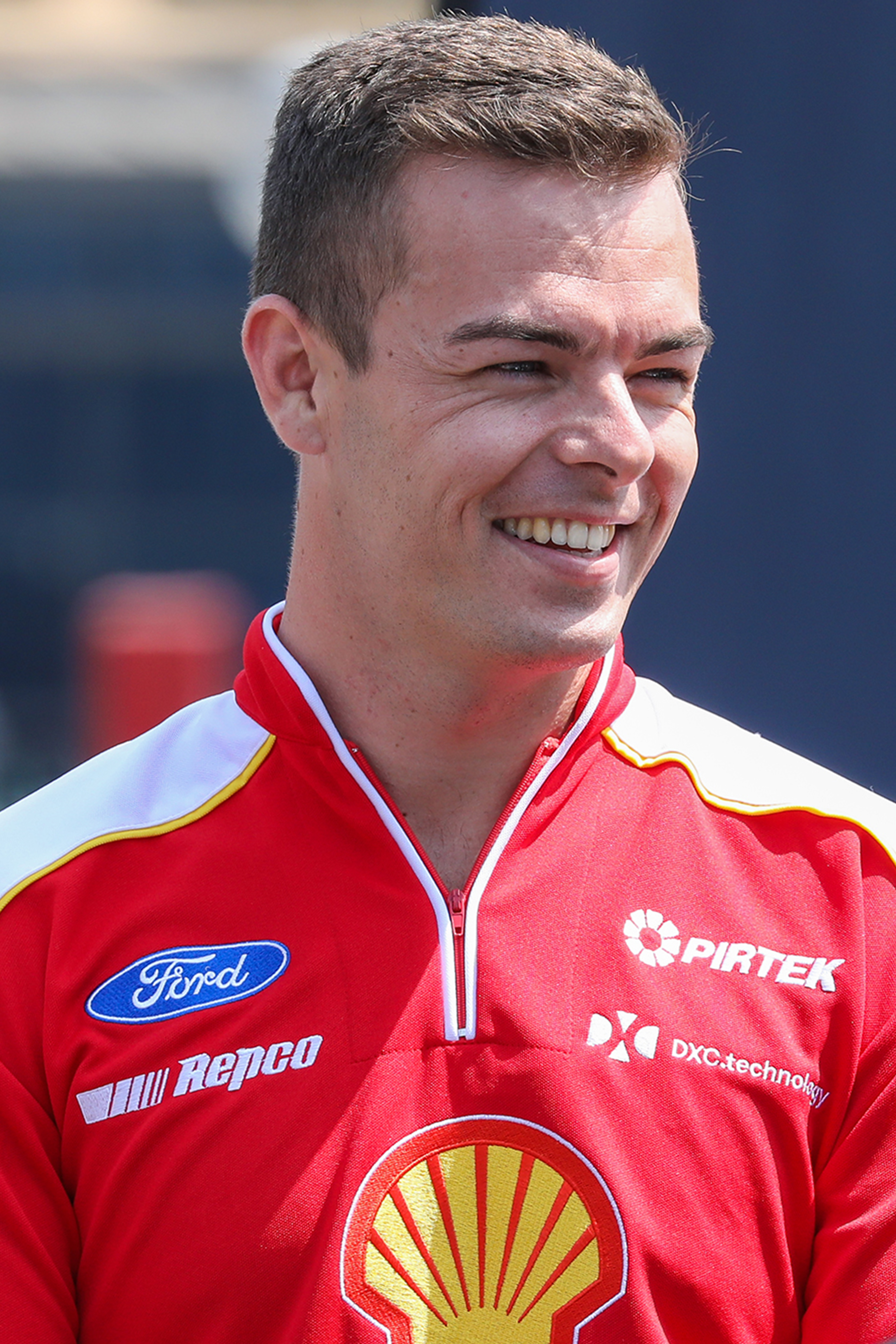
Scott McLaughlin successfully defended his championship title.

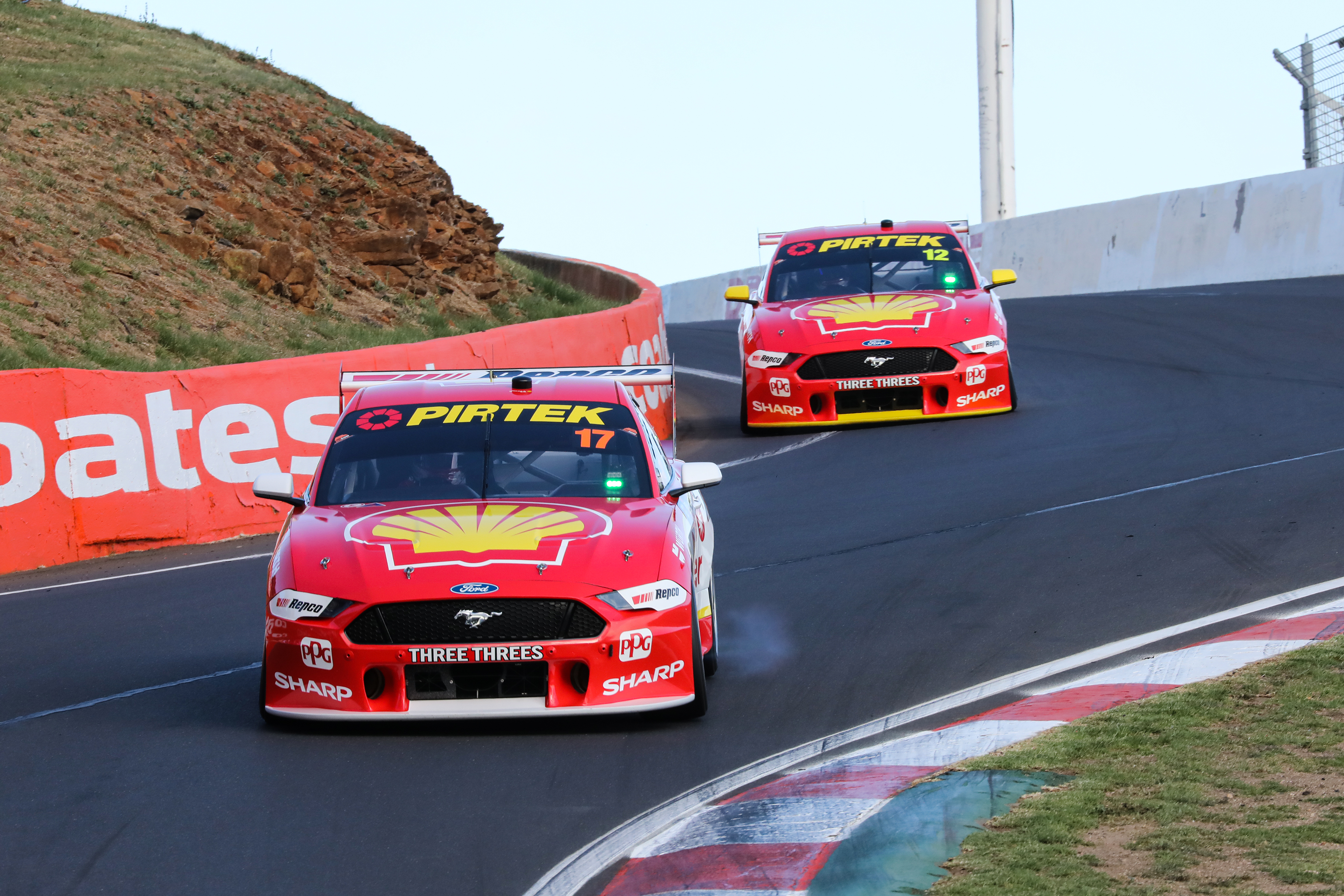
DJR Team Penske won the 2019 teams' championship.

The 2019 Supercars Championship (known for commercial reasons as the 2019 Virgin Australia Supercars Championship) was the twenty-first running of the Supercars Championship and the twenty-third series in which Supercars have contested the Australian Touring Car Championship, the premier title in Australian motorsport. The 2019 championship also included the running of the 1,000th Australian Touring Car Championship race, which was contested at the Melbourne 400.

Scott McLaughlin contested the series as the defending driver's champion. McLaughlin successfully defended his championship title, and in doing so, he broke Craig Lowndes' 1996 record for the most wins in a championship year when he recorded his seventeenth win at Pukekohe Park. (Note: McLaughlin also broke Mark Donohue's record for the most wins in a championship year by a Team Penske driver.) His team, DJR Team Penske, won their second teams' championship. Ford secured the manufacturers' title at the Ipswich SuperSprint.

== Teams and drivers ==
Holden was represented by factory-backed team Triple Eight Race Engineering.

The following teams and drivers competed in the 2019 championship.

| Championship entries | | | | | | Enduro Cup entries | |
| Manufacturer | Model | Team | No. | Driver name | Rounds | Co-driver name | Rounds |
| Ford | Mustang GT | Tickford Racing | 5 | (Australia) Lee Holdsworth | All | (Australia) Thomas Randle | 12–14 |
| Ford | Mustang GT | Tickford Racing | 6 | (Australia) Cam Waters | All | (Australia) Michael Caruso | 12–14 |
| Ford | Mustang GT | Tickford Racing | 55 | (Australia) Chaz Mostert | All | (Australia) James Moffat | 12–14 |
| Ford | Mustang GT | DJR Team Penske | 12 | (New Zealand) Fabian Coulthard | All | (Australia) Tony D'Alberto | 12–14 |
| Ford | Mustang GT | DJR Team Penske | 17 | (New Zealand) Scott McLaughlin | All | (France) Alexandre Prémat | 12–14 |
| Ford | Mustang GT | 23Red Racing (Tickford) | 23 | (Australia) Will Davison | All | (Australia) Alex Davison | 12–14 |
| Holden | Commodore ZB | Walkinshaw Andretti United | 2 | (Australia) Scott Pye | All | (Australia) Warren Luff | 12–14 |
| Holden | Commodore ZB | Walkinshaw Andretti United | 22 | (Australia) James Courtney | All | (Australia) Jack Perkins | 12–14 |
| Holden | Commodore ZB | Brad Jones Racing | 8 | (Australia) Nick Percat | All | (Australia) Tim Blanchard | 12–14 |
| Holden | Commodore ZB | Brad Jones Racing | 14 | (Australia) Tim Slade | All | (Australia) Ashley Walsh | 12–14 |
| Holden | Commodore ZB | Erebus Motorsport | 9 | (Australia) David Reynolds | All | (Australia) Luke Youlden | 12–14 |
| Holden | Commodore ZB | Erebus Motorsport | 99 | (Australia) Anton de Pasquale | All | (Australia) Will Brown | 12–14 |
| Holden | Commodore ZB | Team 18 | 18 | (Australia) Mark Winterbottom | All | (New Zealand) Steven Richards | 12–14 |
| Holden | Commodore ZB | Tekno Autosports | 19 | (Australia) Jack Le Brocq | All | (Australia) Jonathon Webb | 12–14 |
| Holden | Commodore ZB | Tim Blanchard Racing (BJR) | 21 | (Australia) Macauley Jones | All | (Australia) Dean Canto | 12–14 |
| Holden | Commodore ZB | Garry Rogers Motorsport | 33 | (New Zealand) Richie Stanaway | 1–6, 10–15 | (New Zealand) Chris Pither | 12–14 |
| Holden | Commodore ZB | Garry Rogers Motorsport | 33 | (New Zealand) Chris Pither | 6–7, 13 | (Australia) Dylan O'Keeffe | 13 |
| Holden | Commodore ZB | Garry Rogers Motorsport | 33 | (Australia) Michael Caruso | 8–9 | —N/a | |
| Holden | Commodore ZB | Garry Rogers Motorsport | 34 | (Australia) James Golding | All | (Australia) Richard Muscat | 12–14 |
| Holden | Commodore ZB | Matt Stone Racing | 35 | (Australia) Todd Hazelwood | All | (Australia) Jack Smith | 12–14 |
| Holden | Commodore ZB | Triple Eight Race Engineering | 88 | (Australia) Jamie Whincup | All | (Australia) Craig Lowndes | 12–14 |
| Holden | Commodore ZB | Triple Eight Race Engineering | 97 | (New Zealand) Shane van Gisbergen | All | (Australia) Garth Tander | 12–14 |
| Nissan | Altima L33 | Kelly Racing | 3 | (Australia) Garry Jacobson | All | (Australia) Dean Fiore | 12–14 |
| Nissan | Altima L33 | Kelly Racing | 7 | (New Zealand) Andre Heimgartner | All | (Australia) Bryce Fullwood | 12–14 |
| Nissan | Altima L33 | Kelly Racing | 15 | (Australia) Rick Kelly | All | (Australia) Dale Wood | 12–14 |
| Nissan | Altima L33 | Kelly Racing | 78 | (Switzerland) Simona de Silvestro | All | (Australia) Alex Rullo | 12–14 |
Wildcard entries
| Ford | Mustang GT | Tickford Racing | 66 | (Australia) Thomas Randle | 10 | —N/a | |
| Holden | Commodore ZB | Brad Jones Racing | 4 | (Australia) Jack Smith | 3, 6–7, 10 | —N/a | |
| Holden | Commodore ZB | Brad Jones Racing | 77 | (Australia) Tim Blanchard | 5 | —N/a | |
| Holden | Commodore ZB | Walkinshaw Andretti United | 27 | —N/a | | (United States) Alexander Rossi (Canada) James Hinchcliffe | 12 |
| Holden | Commodore ZB | Kostecki Brothers Racing | 56 | —N/a | | (Australia) Brodie Kostecki (Australia) Jake Kostecki | 12–14 |
| Source: | | | | | | Source: | |

=== Manufacturer changes ===
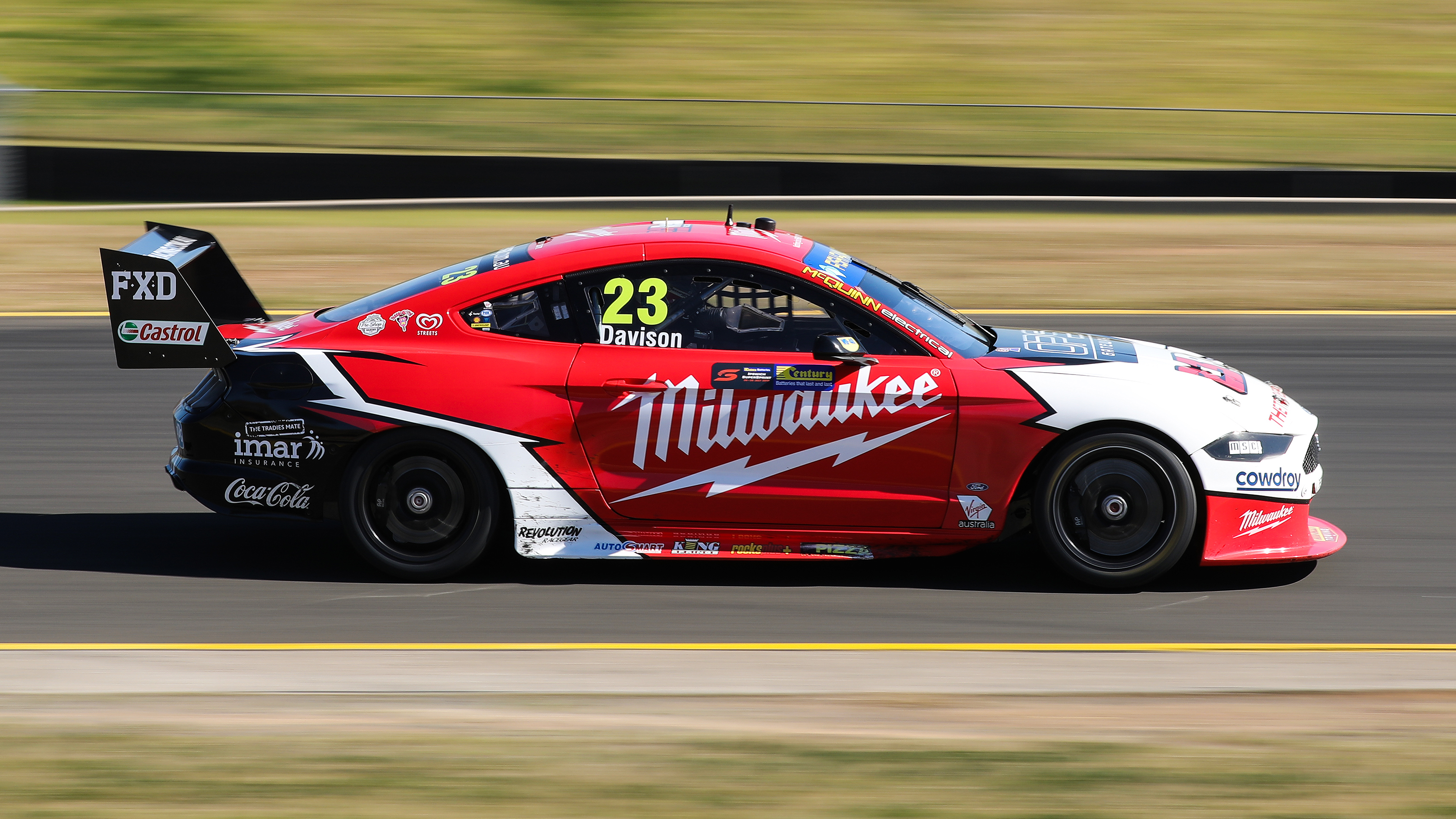
Ford introduced the Mustang as a replacement for the FG X Falcon.

The sixth generation Ford Mustang, the Mustang GT, was homologated for the 2019 championship. The Mustang was a replacement for the FG X Falcon, which was used between 2015 and 2018. Tickford Racing and DJR Team Penske oversaw the development of the car, with Ford Performance providing additional technical support. Ford Australia provided financial support in developing the car, but no team was officially recognised as a factory team. The homologation process required modifications to the bodywork to fit the series' control chassis, but the car continued to use the V8 engine used by the FG X Falcon. The decision to return the Mustang to the series was made as Australia's domestic production of the Ford Falcon ceased in 2016. The Mustang's return marked the first time since 1990 that a Mustang has contested the premier class of Australian motorsport. The car completed the homologation process in December 2018 and was subsequently approved for competition by the Supercars Commission.

Nissan withdrew its factory support from the championship at the end of 2018 as the company elected to change its global motorsport strategy and focus on its Formula E entry. Kelly Racing—who raced under the Nissan Motorsport name between 2013 and 2018—continued to compete with the Altima L33 chassis under licence from the company. Nissan's decision to withdraw from the championship followed the Altima being withdrawn from sale in Australia in 2017.

=== Team changes ===
The number of entries was reduced from twenty-six to twenty-four with both Tickford Racing and Triple Eight Race Engineering returning a Racing Entitlement Contract (REC) to the sport's management. 23Red Racing formed a partnership with Tickford Racing which saw it become a satellite team of Tickford. Matt Stone Racing upgraded from a VF Commodore to a ZB Commodore and are receiving technical support from Triple Eight Race Engineering.

=== Driver changes ===
Michael Caruso left Kelly Racing, joining Tickford Racing as an endurance co-driver. Caruso's seat was filled by Garry Jacobson, who made his full time début in the championship with the team.

Craig Lowndes and Tim Blanchard retired from full-time competition at the end of the 2018 championship. Both returned as endurance co-drivers with Triple Eight Race Engineering and Brad Jones Racing respectively. Blanchard's seat at Tim Blanchard Racing was filled by Macauley Jones. Jones made his full time début in the championship, after having previously entered as a wildcard at selected events in 2017 and 2018.

Mark Winterbottom and Richie Stanaway left Tickford Racing. Winterbottom moved to Team 18, replacing Lee Holdsworth. Holdsworth took Winterbottom's place at Tickford Racing, while Stanaway moved to Garry Rogers Motorsport to replace Garth Tander. Tander stepped down from full-time competition, joining Triple Eight Race Engineering as an endurance co-driver.

=== Mid-season changes ===
Richie Stanaway was withdrawn halfway through the Winton SuperSprint and missed the next three rounds, due to a neck injury. He was replaced for the remainder of the round, and the following Darwin Triple Crown by Chris Pither, who had already been nominated as Stanaway's partner for the endurance races. Michael Caruso stepped in for the Townsville 400 and Ipswich SuperSprint, returning to the team for the first time since 2012. Stanaway was stood down halfway through the Gold Coast 600, due to disciplinary reasons. Chris Pither became the main driver for the Sunday race while Super2 and TCR Australia driver Dylan O'Keeffe made his debut with the team.

=== Wildcard entries ===
Several wildcards were granted for 2019. Brad Jones Racing entered Jack Smith for four rounds and Tim Blanchard at the Perth SuperSprint. Kostecki Brothers Racing would also again run a wildcard, this time for all three endurance events.

Thomas Randle was entered in a third Tickford Racing entry at The Bend SuperSprint.

Walkinshaw Racing entered a third car for the Bathurst 1000, driven by IndyCar stars Alexander Rossi and James Hinchcliffe.

== Calendar ==

The calendar was reduced to fifteen rounds in 2019, with the following events scheduled to take place:

| Round | Event | Circuit | Location | Dates |
|---|---|---|---|---|
| 1 | Adelaide 500 | (South Australia) Adelaide Street Circuit | Adelaide, South Australia | 2–3 March |
| 2 | Melbourne 400 | (Victoria (state)) Albert Park Circuit | Albert Park, Victoria | 15–17 March |
| 3 | Tasmania SuperSprint | (Tasmania) Symmons Plains Raceway | Launceston, Tasmania | 6–7 April |
| 4 | Phillip Island SuperSprint | (Victoria (state)) Phillip Island Grand Prix Circuit | Phillip Island, Victoria | 13–14 April |
| 5 | Perth SuperNight | (Western Australia) Barbagallo Raceway | Neerabup, Western Australia | 3–4 May |
| 6 | Winton SuperSprint | (Victoria (state)) Winton Motor Raceway | Benalla, Victoria | 25–26 May |
| 7 | Darwin Triple Crown | (Northern Territory) Hidden Valley Raceway | Darwin, Northern Territory | 15–16 June |
| 8 | Townsville 400 | (Queensland) Reid Park Street Circuit | Townsville, Queensland | 6–7 July |
| 9 | Ipswich SuperSprint | Queensland Raceway | Ipswich, Queensland | 27–28 July |
| 10 | The Bend SuperSprint | (South Australia) The Bend Motorsport Park | Tailem Bend, South Australia | 24–25 August |
| 11 | Auckland SuperSprint | (New Zealand) Pukekohe Park Raceway | Pukekohe, Auckland Region | 14–15 September |
| 12 | Bathurst 1000 | (New South Wales) Mount Panorama Circuit | Bathurst, New South Wales | 13 October |
| 13 | Gold Coast 600 | (Queensland) Surfers Paradise Street Circuit | Surfers Paradise, Queensland | 26–27 October |
| 14 | Sandown 500 | (Victoria (state)) Sandown Raceway | Springvale, Victoria | 9–10 November |
| 15 | Newcastle 500 | (New South Wales) Newcastle Street Circuit | Newcastle, New South Wales | 23–24 November |

=== Calendar changes ===
The 2019 calendar underwent a radical revision compared to the 2018 calendar. The Sydney SuperNight 300 was removed from the calendar entirely and was replaced by a new night race at Barbagallo Raceway. The change was made with the long-term view to running the Sydney round in January 2020 as part of a proposed move to a "summer series" format that would see the championship run primarily in the summer months.

The Sandown 500 moved to a late-season slot in November, becoming the final round of the Pirtek Enduro Cup, to avoid clashing with the AFL and NRL finals series. The Auckland SuperSprint was brought forward to September, making the Sandown 500 the penultimate round of the championship. Changes to the Formula One calendar meant that the Australian Grand Prix was run earlier in the year than it was in 2018, and thus the Supercars support races was also moved forward. The Adelaide 500 was subsequently brought forward to remain the opening round of the season.

=== Format changes ===
The Phillip Island Grand Prix Circuit event format reverted to a SuperSprint format after two years of two 250 kilometre races known as the Phillip Island 500.

== Rule changes ==
As a cost reduction measure, the use of twin-spring dampers were banned with teams required to use linear spring dampers. A new specification of transaxle developed by Xtrac was introduced.

If a car was released from the pit bay before the fuel rig was decoupled from the car, the car had to be re-raised on its pneumatic jacks and the fuel rig removed before the driver can rejoin the race.

== Results and standings ==
=== Season summary ===
| Round | Race | Event | Pole position | Fastest lap | Winning driver | Winning team | Report |
|---|---|---|---|---|---|---|---|
| 1 | 1 | Adelaide 500 | (New Zealand) Fabian Coulthard | (Australia) Chaz Mostert | (New Zealand) Scott McLaughlin | DJR Team Penske | Report |
| 1 | 2 | Adelaide 500 | (New Zealand) Scott McLaughlin | (Australia) Chaz Mostert | (New Zealand) Scott McLaughlin | DJR Team Penske | Report |
| 2 | 3 | Melbourne 400 | (New Zealand) Scott McLaughlin | (Australia) Chaz Mostert | (New Zealand) Scott McLaughlin | DJR Team Penske | Report |
| 2 | 4 | Melbourne 400 | (New Zealand) Scott McLaughlin | (New Zealand) Scott McLaughlin | (New Zealand) Scott McLaughlin | DJR Team Penske | Report |
| 2 | 5 | Melbourne 400 | (New Zealand) Scott McLaughlin | (Australia) Chaz Mostert | (Australia) Chaz Mostert | Tickford Racing | Report |
| 2 | 6 | Melbourne 400 | (Australia) Chaz Mostert | (New Zealand) Scott McLaughlin | (New Zealand) Scott McLaughlin | DJR Team Penske | Report |
| 3 | 7 | Tasmania SuperSprint | (Australia) Mark Winterbottom | (Australia) James Courtney | (New Zealand) Scott McLaughlin | DJR Team Penske | Report |
| 3 | 8 | Tasmania SuperSprint | (New Zealand) Shane van Gisbergen | (Australia) Mark Winterbottom | (New Zealand) Shane van Gisbergen | Triple Eight Race Engineering | Report |
| 4 | 9 | Phillip Island SuperSprint | (New Zealand) Scott McLaughlin | (New Zealand) Scott McLaughlin | (New Zealand) Scott McLaughlin | DJR Team Penske | Report |
| 4 | 10 | Phillip Island SuperSprint | (New Zealand) Scott McLaughlin | (New Zealand) Scott McLaughlin | (New Zealand) Fabian Coulthard | DJR Team Penske | Report |
| 5 | 11 | Perth SuperNight | (New Zealand) Scott McLaughlin | (Australia) James Courtney | (New Zealand) Fabian Coulthard | DJR Team Penske | Report |
| 5 | 12 | Perth SuperNight | (New Zealand) Scott McLaughlin | (New Zealand) Scott McLaughlin | (New Zealand) Scott McLaughlin | DJR Team Penske | Report |
| 6 | 13 | Winton SuperSprint | (Australia) Chaz Mostert | (New Zealand) Scott McLaughlin | (New Zealand) Scott McLaughlin | DJR Team Penske | Report |
| 6 | 14 | Winton SuperSprint | (New Zealand) Scott McLaughlin | (New Zealand) Scott McLaughlin | (New Zealand) Scott McLaughlin | DJR Team Penske | Report |
| 7 | 15 | Darwin Triple Crown | (New Zealand) Scott McLaughlin | (Australia) Chaz Mostert | (New Zealand) Scott McLaughlin | DJR Team Penske | Report |
| 7 | 16 | Darwin Triple Crown | (New Zealand) Scott McLaughlin | (Australia) Cam Waters | (New Zealand) Scott McLaughlin | DJR Team Penske | Report |
| 8 | 17 | Townsville 400 | (Australia) David Reynolds | (New Zealand) Scott McLaughlin | (New Zealand) Scott McLaughlin | DJR Team Penske | Report |
| 8 | 18 | Townsville 400 | (Australia) Cam Waters | (New Zealand) Scott McLaughlin | (New Zealand) Shane van Gisbergen | Triple Eight Race Engineering | Report |
| 9 | 19 | Ipswich SuperSprint | (New Zealand) Scott McLaughlin | (Australia) Chaz Mostert | (Australia) Jamie Whincup | Triple Eight Race Engineering | Report |
| 9 | 20 | Ipswich SuperSprint | (New Zealand) Scott McLaughlin | (New Zealand) Scott McLaughlin | (New Zealand) Scott McLaughlin | DJR Team Penske | Report |
| 10 | 21 | The Bend SuperSprint | (Australia) Chaz Mostert | (Australia) David Reynolds | (New Zealand) Scott McLaughlin | DJR Team Penske | Report |
| 10 | 22 | The Bend SuperSprint | (New Zealand) Scott McLaughlin | (Australia) Cam Waters | (New Zealand) Scott McLaughlin | DJR Team Penske | Report |
| 11 | 23 | Auckland SuperSprint | (New Zealand) Shane van Gisbergen | (Australia) Jamie Whincup | (New Zealand) Shane van Gisbergen | Triple Eight Race Engineering | Report |
| 11 | 24 | Auckland SuperSprint | (Australia) Jamie Whincup | (Australia) Jamie Whincup | (New Zealand) Scott McLaughlin | DJR Team Penske | Report |
| 12 | 25 | Bathurst 1000 | (Australia) Chaz Mostert (Note: Scott McLaughlin qualified on pole, but was later stripped of the result when his engine was found to have breached the technical regulations. Chaz Mostert was recognised as the pole-sitter in his place.) | (Australia) Chaz Mostert | (New Zealand) Scott McLaughlin (France) Alexandre Prémat | DJR Team Penske | Report |
| 13 | 26 | Gold Coast 600 | (New Zealand) Scott McLaughlin | (New Zealand) Shane van Gisbergen | (Australia) Jamie Whincup (Australia) Craig Lowndes | Triple Eight Race Engineering | Report |
| 13 | 27 | Gold Coast 600 | (New Zealand) Shane van Gisbergen | (Australia) James Courtney | (New Zealand) Shane van Gisbergen (Australia) Garth Tander | Triple Eight Race Engineering | Report |
| 14 | 28 | Sandown 500 | (France) Alexandre Prémat (Note: Pole position for the Sandown qualifying races is not recognised as an official pole position and does not count towards the driver's career statistics.) | (Australia) Bryce Fullwood | (Australia) Craig Lowndes | Triple Eight Race Engineering | Report |
| 14 | 29 | Sandown 500 | (Australia) Jamie Whincup | (Australia) Cam Waters | (Australia) Jamie Whincup | Triple Eight Race Engineering | Report |
| 14 | 30 | Sandown 500 | (Australia) Jamie Whincup (Australia) Craig Lowndes | (New Zealand) Shane van Gisbergen | (Australia) Jamie Whincup (Australia) Craig Lowndes | Triple Eight Race Engineering | Report |
| 15 | 31 | Newcastle 500 | (New Zealand) Shane van Gisbergen | (Australia) James Courtney | (New Zealand) Shane van Gisbergen | Triple Eight Race Engineering | Report |
| 15 | 32 | Newcastle 500 | (Australia) Jamie Whincup | (Australia) James Courtney | (Australia) Jamie Whincup | Triple Eight Race Engineering | Report |

=== Points system ===
Points were awarded for each race at an event, to the driver or drivers of a car that completed at least 75% of the race distance and was running at the completion of the race. At least 50% of the planned race distance must be completed for the result to be valid and championship points awarded.

| Points format | Position | | | | | | | | | | | | | | | | | | | | | | | | | |
| Points format | 1st | 2nd | 3rd | 4th | 5th | 6th | 7th | 8th | 9th | 10th | 11th | 12th | 13th | 14th | 15th | 16th | 17th | 18th | 19th | 20th | 21st | 22nd | 23rd | 24th | 25th | 26th |
|---|---|---|---|---|---|---|---|---|---|---|---|---|---|---|---|---|---|---|---|---|---|---|---|---|---|---|
| Standard | 150 | 138 | 129 | 120 | 111 | 102 | 96 | 90 | 84 | 78 | 72 | 69 | 66 | 63 | 60 | 57 | 54 | 51 | 48 | 45 | 42 | 39 | 36 | 33 | 30 | 27 |
| Bathurst | 300 | 276 | 258 | 240 | 222 | 204 | 192 | 180 | 168 | 156 | 144 | 138 | 132 | 126 | 120 | 114 | 108 | 102 | 96 | 90 | 84 | 78 | 72 | 66 | 60 | 54 |
| Sandown | 250 | 230 | 215 | 200 | 185 | 170 | 160 | 150 | 140 | 130 | 120 | 115 | 110 | 105 | 100 | 95 | 90 | 85 | 80 | 75 | 70 | 65 | 60 | 55 | 50 | |
| Melbourne (long) | 100 | 92 | 86 | 80 | 74 | 68 | 64 | 60 | 56 | 52 | 48 | 46 | 44 | 42 | 40 | 38 | 36 | 34 | 32 | 30 | 28 | 26 | 24 | 22 | | |
| Melbourne (short) | 50 | 46 | 43 | 40 | 37 | 34 | 32 | 30 | 28 | 26 | 24 | 23 | 22 | 21 | 20 | 19 | 18 | 17 | 16 | 15 | 14 | 13 | 12 | 11 | 10 | |

- Standard: Used for all SuperSprint, SuperNight and street races, including the Gold Coast 600.
- Bathurst: Used for the Bathurst 1000.
- Sandown: Used for the Sandown 500.
- Melbourne (long): Used for Race 1 and 3 of the Melbourne 400.
- Melbourne (short): Used for Race 2 and 4 of the Melbourne 400, and the qualifying races for the Sandown 500.

=== Drivers' championship ===
| Pos. | Driver | No. | ADE (South Australia) | | MEL (Victoria (state)) | | | | SYM (Tasmania) | | PHI (Victoria (state)) | | BAR (Western Australia) | | WIN (Victoria (state)) | | HID (Northern Territory) | | TOW (Queensland) | | QLD (Queensland) | | BEN (South Australia) | | PUK (New Zealand) | | BAT (New South Wales) | SUR (Queensland) | | SAN (Victoria (state)) | | | NEW (New South Wales) | | Pen. | Pts. |
|---|---|---|---|---|---|---|---|---|---|---|---|---|---|---|---|---|---|---|---|---|---|---|---|---|---|---|---|---|---|---|---|---|---|---|---|---|
| 1 | (New Zealand) Scott McLaughlin | 17 | 1 | **1** | **1** | **1** | **DNS** | 1 | 1 | 4 | **1** | **2** | **2** | **1** | 1 | **1** | **1** | **1** | 1 | 11 | **4** | **1** | 1 | **1** | 4 | 1 | 1 | **3** | DNS | | 5 | 9 | 2 | 4 | 0 | 3872 |
| 2 | (New Zealand) Shane van Gisbergen | 97 | 3 | 3 | Ret | 10 | 21 | 22 | 3 | **1** | 6 | 7 | 5 | 5 | 5 | 7 | 8 | 10 | 4 | 1 | 5 | 2 | 6 | 6 | **1** | 2 | 2 | 2 | **1** | | Ret | 17 | **1** | 7 | 0 | 3310 |
| 3 | (Australia) Jamie Whincup | 88/888 | 2 | 7 | 8 | 4 | 2 | 3 | 25 | 5 | Ret | 12 | 4 | 2 | 6 | 3 | 5 | 5 | 2 | Ret | 1 | 4 | 11 | 5 | 6 | **16** | 4 | 1 | 2 | | **1** | **1** | 8 | **1** | 0 | 3208 |
| 4 | (New Zealand) Fabian Coulthard | 12 | **6** | 20 | 2 | 5 | 5 | 15 | 2 | 2 | 2 | 1 | 1 | 4 | 15 | 2 | 7 | 3 | 5 | 2 | 10 | 18 | 12 | 10 | 7 | 12 | 21 | 9 | 11 | | 6 | 4 | 3 | 2 | 0 | 3058 |
| 5 | (Australia) Chaz Mostert | 55 | 5 | 15 | 5 | 2 | 1 | **2** | 10 | 10 | 5 | 5 | 3 | Ret | **2** | 10 | 2 | 6 | 3 | 5 | 3 | 3 | **2** | 3 | 24 | 3 | **15** | DNS | DNS | | 9 | 2 | 11 | 6 | 0 | 2879 |
| 6 | (Australia) David Reynolds | 9 | 8 | 9 | 10 | 7 | 4 | 8 | 6 | 3 | 4 | 11 | 10 | 6 | 3 | 4 | 3 | 2 | **6** | 20 | 9 | 21 | 7 | 13 | 3 | 24 | 5 | 22 | 3 | | 3 | Ret | 4 | 16 | 0 | 2694 |
| 7 | (Australia) Cam Waters | 6 | 22 | 2 | 3 | 3 | DNS | 4 | 11 | 11 | Ret | 6 | 8 | 3 | 11 | 6 | 4 | 4 | 21 | **3** | 6 | 6 | 9 | 8 | 2 | 14 | 20 | 4 | 5 | | 14 | 21 | 5 | 8 | 0 | 2588 |
| 8 | (Australia) Will Davison | 23 | 4 | 8 | 4 | 6 | 10 | 5 | 19 | 14 | 10 | 4 | 6 | 8 | 12 | Ret | 12 | 9 | 7 | 21 | 2 | 5 | Ret | 2 | 9 | 13 | 10 | 7 | 7 | | 4 | 6 | 15 | 13 | 0 | 2495 |
| 9 | (Australia) Nick Percat | 8 | 7 | 5 | 14 | 15 | 8 | 10 | 8 | 7 | 9 | 10 | 7 | 10 | 7 | 9 | 13 | 15 | 8 | 19 | 8 | 9 | 8 | 4 | 12 | 4 | 14 | 14 | 10 | | 18 | 11 | 14 | 9 | 0 | 2445 |
| 10 | (Australia) Lee Holdsworth | 5 | 21 | 11 | 9 | 12 | 12 | 9 | 13 | 9 | 15 | 14 | 9 | 9 | 22 | 5 | 6 | 7 | 10 | 8 | 7 | 14 | 13 | 9 | 5 | 15 | 9 | 6 | 6 | | 7 | 3 | 12 | 23 | 0 | 2428 |
| 11 | (Australia) James Courtney | 22 | 10 | 12 | 7 | 9 | 7 | 16 | 5 | 13 | 22 | 24 | 25 | 16 | 4 | 13 | 9 | 14 | 13 | 13 | 11 | 12 | 10 | 15 | 17 | 17 | 3 | 12 | 9 | | 10 | 7 | 7 | 11 | 0 | 2275 |
| 12 | (Australia) Scott Pye | 2 | Ret | 17 | 13 | 14 | 6 | 11 | 12 | 8 | 8 | 15 | 16 | Ret | 10 | 8 | 10 | 19 | 20 | 15 | 21 | 16 | 15 | 16 | 13 | 6 | 7 | 5 | 4 | | 23 | 5 | 6 | 5 | 0 | 2193 |
| 13 | (Australia) Mark Winterbottom | 18 | 9 | 6 | 12 | 11 | 13 | 6 | **4** | 6 | 21 | 17 | 18 | 15 | 9 | 22 | 17 | 12 | 9 | Ret | 15 | 10 | 4 | 23 | 22 | 8 | 6 | 19 | 19 | | 15 | 12 | 10 | 14 | 0 | 2092 |
| 14 | (Australia) Anton de Pasquale | 99 | 16 | 14 | 11 | 13 | 11 | 12 | 9 | 23 | 12 | 3 | 13 | 7 | 18 | 17 | 11 | 8 | 11 | 4 | 14 | 11 | 3 | 7 | 15 | 20 | Ret | 11 | 8 | | 13 | 10 | 23 | Ret | 0 | 2015 |
| 15 | (Australia) Tim Slade | 14 | 17 | 4 | 6 | 8 | 3 | 7 | 7 | 12 | 17 | 9 | 11 | 11 | 13 | 12 | Ret | 18 | 16 | 12 | Ret | 17 | 14 | 12 | 11 | 18 | Ret | 8 | 17 | | 20 | 13 | 9 | 3 | 0 | 1940 |
| 16 | (New Zealand) Andre Heimgartner | 7 | 13 | 13 | 15 | 18 | 9 | 14 | 18 | 17 | 3 | 13 | 17 | 23 | 8 | 11 | 16 | 11 | 12 | 18 | 12 | 7 | 5 | 20 | 8 | 19 | Ret | Ret | 21 | | 2 | 8 | 21 | 12 | 0 | 1875 |
| 17 | (Australia) Rick Kelly | 15 | 11 | 24 | 22 | 16 | 16 | 19 | 17 | 15 | 7 | 8 | 15 | 20 | 14 | Ret | 21 | 16 | 17 | 6 | 16 | 8 | 23 | 11 | 19 | 11 | 8 | 10 | 14 | | 17 | 22 | 13 | 19 | 0 | 1820 |
| 18 | (Australia) Todd Hazelwood | 35 | 12 | 10 | 23 | 17 | 14 | 13 | 14 | 18 | 11 | 16 | 23 | 14 | 19 | 15 | 18 | 13 | 14 | 16 | 19 | 13 | Ret | 14 | 14 | 5 | Ret | 20 | 20 | | 11 | 20 | 18 | 10 | 0 | 1609 |
| 19 | (Switzerland) Simona de Silvestro | 78 | 15 | 16 | 18 | 19 | 17 | 21 | 21 | 21 | 16 | 18 | 12 | 12 | 23 | 23 | 19 | 20 | 19 | 10 | 18 | 19 | Ret | 22 | 16 | 7 | 13 | 21 | 22 | | 12 | 15 | 19 | 18 | 0 | 1564 |
| 20 | (Australia) James Golding | 34 | 14 | 19 | 16 | 23 | 18 | 18 | 15 | 16 | 13 | 22 | 14 | 13 | 17 | 19 | Ret | 17 | 15 | 7 | 13 | 15 | 18 | 18 | 23 | 10 | 11 | 16 | Ret | | 16 | Ret | 22 | 20 | 0 | 1521 |
| 21 | (Australia) Macauley Jones | 21 | DNS | 23 | 19 | 22 | 20 | Ret | 20 | 20 | 18 | 21 | 24 | 17 | 16 | 16 | 22 | 22 | 18 | 17 | Ret | 22 | 19 | 21 | 20 | 22 | 16 | 17 | 15 | | 21 | 18 | 17 | 21 | 0 | 1314 |
| 22 | (Australia) Jack Le Brocq | 19 | 20 | 21 | 20 | 20 | 15 | 23 | 22 | 22 | 20 | 20 | 20 | 22 | 20 | 20 | Ret | 21 | 23 | 14 | 22 | 23 | 21 | 25 | 21 | 23 | 17 | 13 | 13 | | 24 | 19 | Ret | 17 | 0 | 1277 |
| 23 | (Australia) Garry Jacobson | 3 | 19 | 22 | 21 | 24 | 19 | 17 | 24 | Ret | 19 | 19 | 19 | 19 | 21 | 18 | 14 | 24 | 24 | Ret | 20 | Ret | 20 | 19 | 18 | 21 | 19 | 15 | 12 | | 22 | Ret | 20 | 22 | 0 | 1176 |
| 24 | (New Zealand) Richie Stanaway | 33 | 18 | 18 | 17 | 21 | DSQ | 20 | 16 | 19 | 14 | 23 | 22 | 21 | 25 | WD | | | | | | | 16 | 24 | 10 | 9 | 12 | 23 | WD | | 19 | 14 | 16 | 15 | 0 | 1146 |
| 25 | (Australia) Craig Lowndes | 888 | | | | | | | | | | | | | | | | | | | | | | | | | 4 | 1 | 2 | 1 | | **1** | | | 0 | 828 |
| 26 | (Australia) Thomas Randle | 66/5 | | | | | | | | | | | | | | | | | | | | | 17 | 17 | | | 9 | 6 | 6 | 5 | | 3 | | | 0 | 732 |
| 27 | (Australia) Garth Tander | 97 | | | | | | | | | | | | | | | | | | | | | | | | | 2 | 2 | **1** | 3 | | 17 | | | 0 | 697 |
| 28 | (Australia) Michael Caruso | 33/6 | | | | | | | | | | | | | | | | | 22 | 9 | 17 | 20 | | | | | 20 | 4 | 5 | 8 | | 21 | | | 0 | 643 |
| 29 | (Australia) Warren Luff | 2 | | | | | | | | | | | | | | | | | | | | | | | | | 7 | 5 | 4 | 11 | | 5 | | | 0 | 632 |
| 30 | (France) Alexandre Prémat | 17 | | | | | | | | | | | | | | | | | | | | | | | | | 1 | **3** | DNS | **6** | | 9 | | | 0 | 603 |
| 31 | (Australia) Jack Perkins | 22 | | | | | | | | | | | | | | | | | | | | | | | | | 3 | 12 | 9 | 18 | | 7 | | | 0 | 588 |
| 32 | (Australia) Alex Davison | 23 | | | | | | | | | | | | | | | | | | | | | | | | | 10 | 7 | 7 | 10 | | 6 | | | 0 | 544 |
| 33 | (New Zealand) Chris Pither | 33 | | | | | | | | | | | | | | 14 | 15 | 23 | | | | | | | | | 12 | 23 | 18 | 17 | | 14 | | | 0 | 507 |
| 34 | (Australia) Tim Blanchard | 77/8 | | | | | | | | | | | 21 | 18 | | | | | | | | | | | | | 14 | 14 | 10 | 16 | | 11 | | | 0 | 499 |
| 35 | (Australia) Tony D'Alberto | 12 | | | | | | | | | | | | | | | | | | | | | | | | | 21 | 9 | 11 | 13 | | 4 | | | 0 | 462 |
| 36 | (Australia) Jack Smith | 4/35 | | | | | | | 23 | 24 | | | | | 24 | 21 | 20 | 25 | | | | | 22 | 26 | | | Ret | 20 | 20 | 24 | | 20 | | | 0 | 461 |
| 37 | (New Zealand) Steven Richards | 18 | | | | | | | | | | | | | | | | | | | | | | | | | 6 | 19 | 19 | 12 | | 12 | | | 0 | 438 |
| 38 | (Australia) Luke Youlden | 9 | | | | | | | | | | | | | | | | | | | | | | | | | 5 | 22 | 3 | 7 | | Ret | | | 0 | 422 |
| 39 | (Australia) Dale Wood | 15 | | | | | | | | | | | | | | | | | | | | | | | | | 8 | 10 | 14 | 14 | | 22 | | | 0 | 407 |
| 40 | (Australia) James Moffat | 55 | | | | | | | | | | | | | | | | | | | | | | | | | **15** | DNS | DNS | Ret | | 2 | | | 0 | 350 |
| 41 | (Australia) Will Brown | 99 | | | | | | | | | | | | | | | | | | | | | | | | | Ret | 11 | 8 | 2 | | 10 | | | 0 | 338 |
| 42 | (Australia) Jonathon Webb | 19 | | | | | | | | | | | | | | | | | | | | | | | | | 17 | 13 | 13 | 20 | | 19 | | | 0 | 335 |
| 43 | (Australia) Alex Rullo | 78 | | | | | | | | | | | | | | | | | | | | | | | | | 13 | 21 | 22 | 19 | | 15 | | | 0 | 329 |
| 44 | (Australia) Dean Canto | 21 | | | | | | | | | | | | | | | | | | | | | | | | | 16 | 17 | 15 | 22 | | 18 | | | 0 | 326 |
| 45 | (Australia) Ashley Walsh | 14 | | | | | | | | | | | | | | | | | | | | | | | | | Ret | 8 | 17 | 23 | | 13 | | | 0 | 266 |
| 46 | (Australia) Dean Fiore | 3 | | | | | | | | | | | | | | | | | | | | | | | | | 19 | 15 | 12 | 15 | | Ret | | | 0 | 245 |
| 47 | (Australia) Brodie Kostecki | 56 | | | | | | | | | | | | | | | | | | | | | | | | | Ret | 18 | 16 | | 8 | 16 | | | 0 | 233 |
| 48 | (Australia) Bryce Fullwood | 7 | | | | | | | | | | | | | | | | | | | | | | | | | Ret | Ret | 21 | 4 | | 8 | | | 0 | 232 |
| 49 | (Australia) Richard Muscat | 34 | | | | | | | | | | | | | | | | | | | | | | | | | 11 | 16 | Ret | 9 | | Ret | | | 0 | 229 |
| 50 | (Australia) Jake Kostecki | 56 | | | | | | | | | | | | | | | | | | | | | | | | | Ret | 18 | 16 | 21 | | 16 | | | 0 | 217 |
| 51 | (Canada) James Hinchcliffe | 27 | | | | | | | | | | | | | | | | | | | | | | | | | 18 | | | | | | | | 0 | 102 |
| 52 | (United States) Alexander Rossi | 27 | | | | | | | | | | | | | | | | | | | | | | | | | 18 | | | | | | | | 0 | 102 |
| 53 | (Australia) Dylan O'Keeffe | 33 | | | | | | | | | | | | | | | | | | | | | | | | | | | 18 | | | | | | 0 | 51 |
| Pos. | Driver | No. | ADE (South Australia) | | MEL (Victoria (state)) | | | | SYM (Tasmania) | | PHI (Victoria (state)) | | BAR (Western Australia) | | WIN (Victoria (state)) | | HID (Northern Territory) | | TOW (Queensland) | | QLD (Queensland) | | BEN (South Australia) | | PUK (New Zealand) | | BAT (New South Wales) | SUR (Queensland) | | SAN (Victoria (state)) | | | NEW (New South Wales) | | Pen. | Pts. |

Key
| Colour | Result |
|---|---|
| Gold | Winner |
| Silver | Second place |
| Bronze | Third place |
| Green | Other points position |
| Blue | Other classified position |
| Blue | Not classified, finished (NC) |
| Purple | Not classified, retired (Ret) |
| Red | Did not qualify (DNQ) |
| Red | Did not pre-qualify (DNPQ) |
| Black | Disqualified (DSQ) |
| White | Did not start (DNS) |
| White | Race cancelled (C) |
| Blank | Did not practice (DNP) |
| Blank | Excluded (EX) |
| Blank | Did not arrive (DNA) |
| Blank | Withdrawn (WD) |
| Blank | Did not enter (cell empty) |
| Text formatting | Meaning |
| **Bold** | Pole position |
| Italics | Fastest lap |

Results count toward the Enduro Cup.

=== Teams' championship ===
| Pos. | Team | No. | ADE (South Australia) | | MEL (Victoria (state)) | | | | SYM (Tasmania) | | PHI (Victoria (state)) | | BAR (Western Australia) | | WIN (Victoria (state)) | | HID (Northern Territory) | | TOW (Queensland) | | QLD (Queensland) | | BEN (South Australia) | | PUK (New Zealand) | | BAT (New South Wales) | SUR (Queensland) | | SAN (Victoria (state)) | NEW (New South Wales) | | Pen. | Pts. |
|---|---|---|---|---|---|---|---|---|---|---|---|---|---|---|---|---|---|---|---|---|---|---|---|---|---|---|---|---|---|---|---|---|---|---|
| 1 | DJR Team Penske | 12 | **6** | 20 | 2 | 5 | 5 | 15 | 2 | 2 | 2 | 1 | 1 | 4 | 15 | 2 | 7 | 3 | 5 | 2 | 10 | 18 | 12 | 10 | 7 | 12 | 21 | 9 | 11 | 4 | 3 | 2 | 360 | 6626 |
| 1 | DJR Team Penske | 17 | 1 | **1** | **1** | **1** | **DNS** | 1 | 1 | 4 | **1** | **2** | **2** | **1** | 1 | **1** | **1** | **1** | 1 | 11 | **4** | **1** | 1 | **1** | 4 | 1 | **1** | **3** | DNS | 9 | 2 | 4 | 360 | 6626 |
| 2 | Triple Eight Race Engineering | 88/888 | 2 | 7 | 8 | 4 | 2 | 3 | 25 | 5 | Ret | 12 | 4 | 2 | 6 | 3 | 5 | 5 | 2 | Ret | 1 | 4 | 11 | 5 | 6 | **16** | 4 | 1 | 2 | **1** | 8 | **1** | 140 | 6471 |
| 2 | Triple Eight Race Engineering | 97 | 3 | 3 | Ret | 10 | 21 | 22 | 3 | **1** | 6 | 7 | 5 | 5 | 5 | 7 | 8 | 10 | 4 | 1 | 5 | 2 | 6 | 6 | **1** | 2 | 2 | 2 | **1** | 17 | **1** | 7 | 140 | 6471 |
| 3 | Tickford Racing | 5 | 21 | 11 | 9 | 12 | 12 | 9 | 13 | 9 | 15 | 14 | 9 | 9 | 22 | 5 | 6 | 7 | 10 | 8 | 7 | 14 | 13 | 9 | 5 | 15 | 9 | 6 | 6 | 3 | 12 | 23 | 50 | 5294 |
| 3 | Tickford Racing | 55 | 5 | 15 | 5 | 2 | 1 | **2** | 10 | 10 | 5 | 5 | 3 | Ret | **2** | 10 | 2 | 6 | 3 | 5 | 3 | 3 | **2** | 3 | 24 | 3 | 15 | DNS | DNS | 2 | 11 | 6 | 50 | 5294 |
| 4 | Tickford Racing/ 23Red Racing | 6 | 22 | 2 | 3 | 3 | DNS | 4 | 11 | 11 | Ret | 6 | 8 | 3 | 11 | 6 | 4 | 4 | 21 | **3** | 6 | 6 | 9 | 8 | 2 | 14 | 20 | 4 | 5 | 21 | 5 | 8 | 80 | 5059 |
| 4 | Tickford Racing/ 23Red Racing | 23 | 4 | 8 | 4 | 6 | 10 | 5 | 19 | 14 | 10 | 4 | 6 | 8 | 12 | Ret | 12 | 9 | 7 | 21 | 2 | 5 | Ret | 2 | 9 | 13 | 10 | 7 | 7 | 6 | 15 | 13 | 80 | 5059 |
| 5 | Erebus Motorsport | 9 | 8 | 9 | 10 | 7 | 4 | 8 | 6 | 3 | 4 | 11 | 10 | 6 | 3 | 4 | 3 | 2 | **6** | 20 | 9 | 21 | 7 | 13 | 3 | 24 | 5 | 22 | 3 | Ret | 4 | 16 | 30 | 4757 |
| 5 | Erebus Motorsport | 99 | 16 | 14 | 11 | 13 | 11 | 12 | 9 | 23 | 12 | 3 | 13 | 7 | 18 | 17 | 11 | 8 | 11 | 4 | 14 | 11 | 3 | 7 | 15 | 20 | Ret | 11 | 8 | 10 | 23 | Ret | 30 | 4757 |
| 6 | Walkinshaw Andretti United | 2 | Ret | 17 | 13 | 14 | 6 | 11 | 12 | 8 | 8 | 15 | 16 | Ret | 10 | 8 | 10 | 19 | 20 | 15 | 21 | 16 | 15 | 16 | 13 | 6 | 7 | 5 | 4 | 5 | 6 | 5 | 60 | 4449 |
| 6 | Walkinshaw Andretti United | 22 | 10 | 12 | 7 | 9 | 7 | 16 | 5 | 13 | 22 | 24 | 25 | 16 | 4 | 13 | 9 | 14 | 13 | 13 | 11 | 12 | 10 | 15 | 17 | 17 | 3 | 12 | 9 | 7 | 7 | 11 | 60 | 4449 |
| 7 | Brad Jones Racing | 8 | 7 | 5 | 14 | 15 | 8 | 10 | 8 | 7 | 9 | 10 | 7 | 10 | 7 | 9 | 13 | 15 | 8 | 19 | 8 | 9 | 8 | 4 | 12 | 4 | 14 | 14 | 10 | 11 | 14 | 9 | 0 | 4416 |
| 7 | Brad Jones Racing | 14 | 17 | 4 | 6 | 8 | 3 | 7 | 7 | 12 | 17 | 9 | 11 | 11 | 13 | 12 | Ret | 18 | 16 | 12 | Ret | 17 | 14 | 12 | 11 | 18 | Ret | 8 | 17 | 13 | 9 | 3 | 0 | 4416 |
| 8 | Kelly Racing | 7 | 13 | 13 | 15 | 18 | 9 | 14 | 18 | 17 | 3 | 13 | 17 | 23 | 8 | 11 | 16 | 11 | 12 | 18 | 12 | 7 | 5 | 20 | 8 | 19 | Ret | Ret | 21 | 8 | 21 | 12 | 50 | 3706 |
| 8 | Kelly Racing | 15 | 11 | 24 | 22 | 16 | 16 | 19 | 17 | 15 | 7 | 8 | 15 | 20 | 14 | Ret | 21 | 16 | 17 | 6 | 16 | 8 | 23 | 11 | 19 | 11 | 8 | 10 | 14 | 22 | 13 | 19 | 50 | 3706 |
| 9 | Garry Rogers Motorsport | 33 | 18 | 18 | 17 | 21 | DSQ | 20 | 16 | 19 | 14 | 23 | 22 | 21 | 25 | 14 | 15 | 23 | 22 | 9 | 17 | 20 | 16 | 24 | 10 | 9 | 12 | 23 | 18 | 14 | 16 | 15 | 0 | 3145 |
| 9 | Garry Rogers Motorsport | 34 | 14 | 19 | 16 | 23 | 18 | 18 | 15 | 16 | 13 | 22 | 14 | 13 | 17 | 19 | Ret | 17 | 15 | 7 | 13 | 15 | 18 | 18 | 23 | 10 | 11 | 16 | Ret | Ret | 22 | 20 | 0 | 3145 |
| 10 | Kelly Racing | 3 | 19 | 22 | 21 | 24 | 19 | 17 | 24 | Ret | 19 | 19 | 19 | 19 | 21 | 18 | 14 | 24 | 24 | Ret | 20 | Ret | 20 | 19 | 18 | 21 | 19 | 15 | 12 | Ret | 20 | 22 | 30 | 2746 |
| 10 | Kelly Racing | 78 | 15 | 16 | 18 | 19 | 17 | 21 | 21 | 21 | 16 | 18 | 12 | 12 | 23 | 23 | 19 | 20 | 19 | 10 | 18 | 19 | Ret | 22 | 16 | 7 | 13 | 21 | 22 | 15 | 19 | 18 | 30 | 2746 |
| 11 | Team 18 | 18 | 9 | 6 | 12 | 11 | 13 | 6 | **4** | 6 | 21 | 17 | 18 | 15 | 9 | 22 | 17 | 12 | 9 | Ret | 15 | 10 | 4 | 23 | 22 | 8 | 6 | 19 | 19 | 12 | 10 | 14 | 60 | 2055 |
| 12 | Matt Stone Racing | 35 | 12 | 10 | 23 | 17 | 14 | 13 | 14 | 18 | 11 | 16 | 23 | 14 | 19 | 15 | 18 | 13 | 14 | 16 | 19 | 13 | Ret | 14 | 14 | 5 | Ret | 20 | 20 | 20 | 18 | 10 | 60 | 1560 |
| 13 | Tim Blanchard Racing | 21 | DNS | 23 | 19 | 22 | 20 | Ret | 20 | 20 | 18 | 21 | 24 | 17 | 16 | 16 | 22 | 22 | 18 | 17 | Ret | 22 | 19 | 21 | 20 | 22 | 16 | 17 | 15 | 18 | 17 | 21 | 0 | 1327 |
| 14 | Tekno Autosports | 19 | 20 | 21 | 20 | 20 | 15 | 23 | 22 | 22 | 20 | 20 | 20 | 22 | 20 | 20 | Ret | 21 | 23 | 14 | 22 | 23 | 21 | 25 | 21 | 23 | 17 | 13 | 13 | 19 | Ret | 17 | 30 | 1262 |
| Pos. | Team | No. | ADE (South Australia) | | MEL (Victoria (state)) | | | | SYM (Tasmania) | | PHI (Victoria (state)) | | BAR (Western Australia) | | WIN (Victoria (state)) | | HID (Northern Territory) | | TOW (Queensland) | | QLD (Queensland) | | BEN (South Australia) | | PUK (New Zealand) | | BAT (New South Wales) | SUR (Queensland) | | SAN (Victoria (state)) | NEW (New South Wales) | | Pen. | Pts. |

Key
| Colour | Result |
|---|---|
| Gold | Winner |
| Silver | Second place |
| Bronze | Third place |
| Green | Other points position |
| Blue | Other classified position |
| Blue | Not classified, finished (NC) |
| Purple | Not classified, retired (Ret) |
| Red | Did not qualify (DNQ) |
| Red | Did not pre-qualify (DNPQ) |
| Black | Disqualified (DSQ) |
| White | Did not start (DNS) |
| White | Race cancelled (C) |
| Blank | Did not practice (DNP) |
| Blank | Excluded (EX) |
| Blank | Did not arrive (DNA) |
| Blank | Withdrawn (WD) |
| Blank | Did not enter (cell empty) |
| Text formatting | Meaning |
| **Bold** | Pole position |
| Italics | Fastest lap |

Results count toward the Enduro Cup.

=== Enduro Cup ===
| Pos. | Drivers | No. | BAT (New South Wales) | SUR (Queensland) | | SAN (Victoria (state)) | | | Pen. | Pts. |
|---|---|---|---|---|---|---|---|---|---|---|
| 1 | Craig Lowndes / Jamie Whincup | 888 | 4 | 1 | 2 | 1 | **1** | **1** | 0 | 878 |
| 2 | Shane van Gisbergen / Garth Tander | 97 | 2 | 2 | **1** | 3 | Ret | 17 | 0 | 697 |
| 3 | Lee Holdsworth / Thomas Randle | 5 | 9 | 6 | 6 | 5 | 7 | 3 | 0 | 656 |
| 4 | Scott Pye / Warren Luff | 2 | 7 | 5 | 4 | 11 | 23 | 5 | 0 | 644 |
| 5 | Scott McLaughlin / Alexandre Prémat | 17 | 1 | **3** | DNS | **6** | 5 | 9 | 0 | 640 |
| 6 | James Courtney / Jack Perkins | 22 | 3 | 12 | 9 | 18 | 10 | 7 | 0 | 614 |
| 7 | Will Davison / Alex Davison | 23 | 10 | 7 | 7 | 10 | 4 | 6 | 0 | 584 |
| 8 | Fabian Coulthard / Tony D'Alberto | 12 | 21 | 9 | 11 | 13 | 6 | 4 | 0 | 496 |
| 9 | David Reynolds / Luke Youlden | 9 | 5 | 22 | 3 | 7 | 3 | Ret | 0 | 465 |
| 10 | Mark Winterbottom / Steven Richards | 18 | 6 | 19 | 19 | 12 | 15 | 12 | 0 | 458 |
| 11 | Cam Waters / Michael Caruso | 6 | 20 | 4 | 5 | 8 | 14 | 21 | 0 | 442 |
| 12 | Rick Kelly / Dale Wood | 15 | 8 | 10 | 14 | 14 | 17 | 22 | 0 | 425 |
| 13 | Nick Percat / Tim Blanchard | 8 | 14 | 14 | 10 | 16 | 18 | 11 | 0 | 423 |
| 14 | Chaz Mostert / James Moffat | 55 | **15** | DNS | DNS | Ret | 9 | 2 | 0 | 378 |
| 15 | Anton de Pasquale / Will Brown | 99 | Ret | 11 | 8 | 2 | 13 | 10 | 0 | 360 |
| 16 | Simona de Silvestro / Alex Rullo | 78 | 13 | 21 | 22 | 19 | 12 | 15 | 0 | 352 |
| 17 | Jack Le Brocq / Jonathon Webb | 19 | 17 | 13 | 13 | 20 | 24 | 19 | 0 | 346 |
| 18 | Macauley Jones / Dean Canto | 21 | 16 | 17 | 15 | 22 | 21 | 18 | 0 | 340 |
| 19 | Richie Stanaway / Chris Pither | 33 | 12 | 23 | WD | 17 | 19 | 14 | 0 | 313 |
| 20 | Tim Slade / Ashley Walsh | 14 | Ret | 8 | 17 | 23 | 20 | 13 | 0 | 281 |
| 21 | Andre Heimgartner / Bryce Fullwood | 7 | Ret | Ret | 21 | 4 | 2 | 8 | 0 | 278 |
| 22 | Garry Jacobson / Dean Fiore | 3 | 19 | 15 | 12 | 15 | 22 | Ret | 0 | 258 |
| 23 | James Golding / Richard Muscat | 34 | 11 | 16 | Ret | 9 | 16 | Ret | 0 | 248 |
| 24 | Brodie Kostecki / Jake Kostecki | 56 | Ret | 18 | 16 | 21 | 8 | 16 | 0 | 247 |
| 25 | Todd Hazelwood / Jack Smith | 35 | Ret | 20 | 20 | 24 | 11 | 20 | 0 | 200 |
| 26 | Alexander Rossi / James Hinchcliffe | 27 | 18 | | | | | | 0 | 108 |
| Pos. | Drivers | No. | BAT (New South Wales) | SUR (Queensland) | | SAN (Victoria (state)) | | | Pen. | Pts. |

| Colour | Result |
|---|---|
| Gold | Winner |
| Silver | Second place |
| Bronze | Third place |
| Green | Points classification |
| Blue | Non-points classification |
| Blue | Non-classified finish (NC) |
| Purple | Retired, not classified (Ret) |
| Red | Did not qualify (DNQ) |
| Red | Did not pre-qualify (DNPQ) |
| Black | Disqualified (DSQ) |
| White | Did not start (DNS) |
| White | Withdrew (WD) |
| White | Race cancelled (C) |
| Blank | Did not practice (DNP) |
| Blank | Did not arrive (DNA) |
| Blank | Excluded (EX) |

Bold - Pole position
Italics - Fastest lap

=== Manufacturers' championship ===
The Manufacturers' championship was won by Ford.

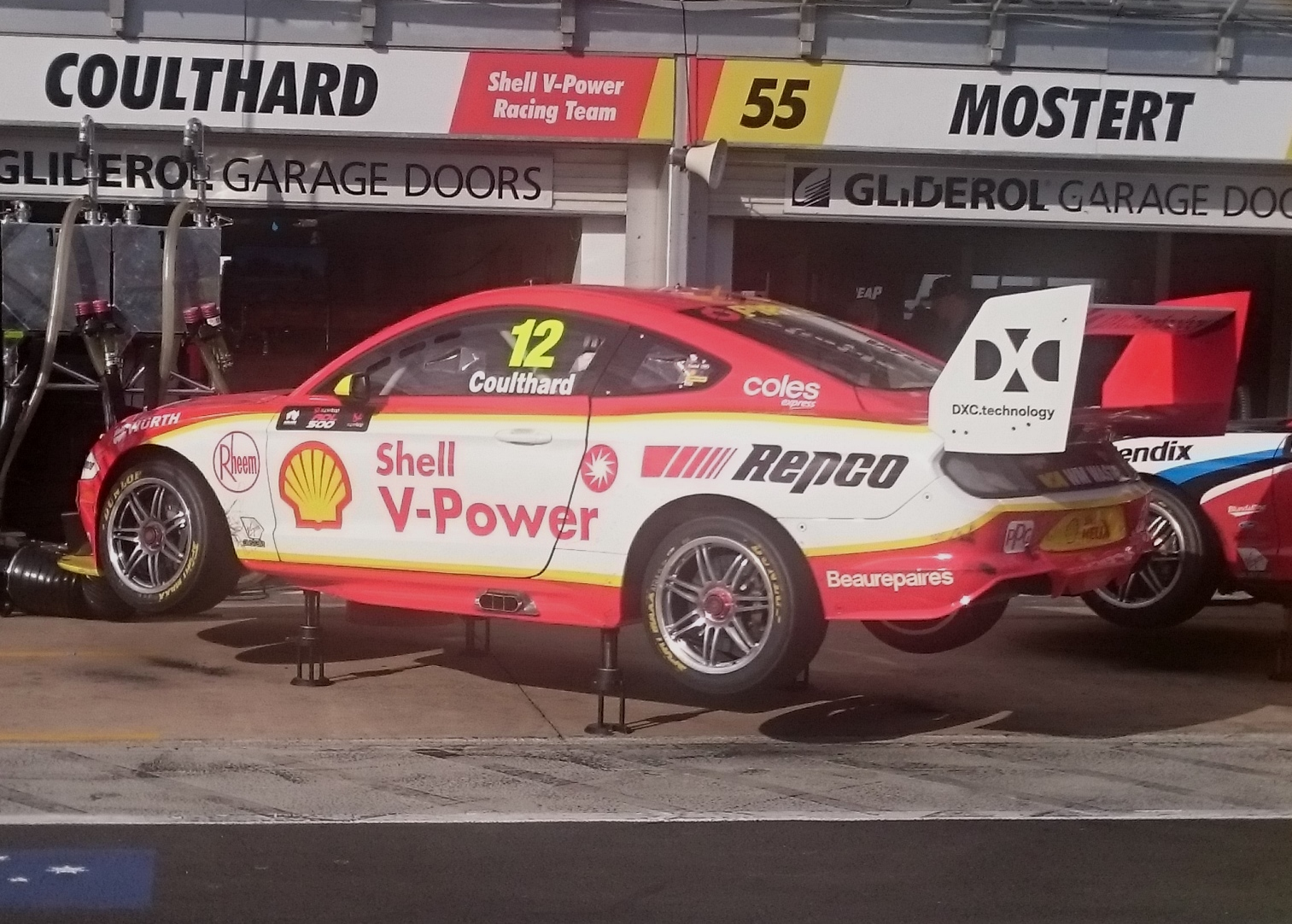
Fabian Coulthard placed fourth in the Drivers Championship driving a Ford Mustang GT for DJR Team Penske

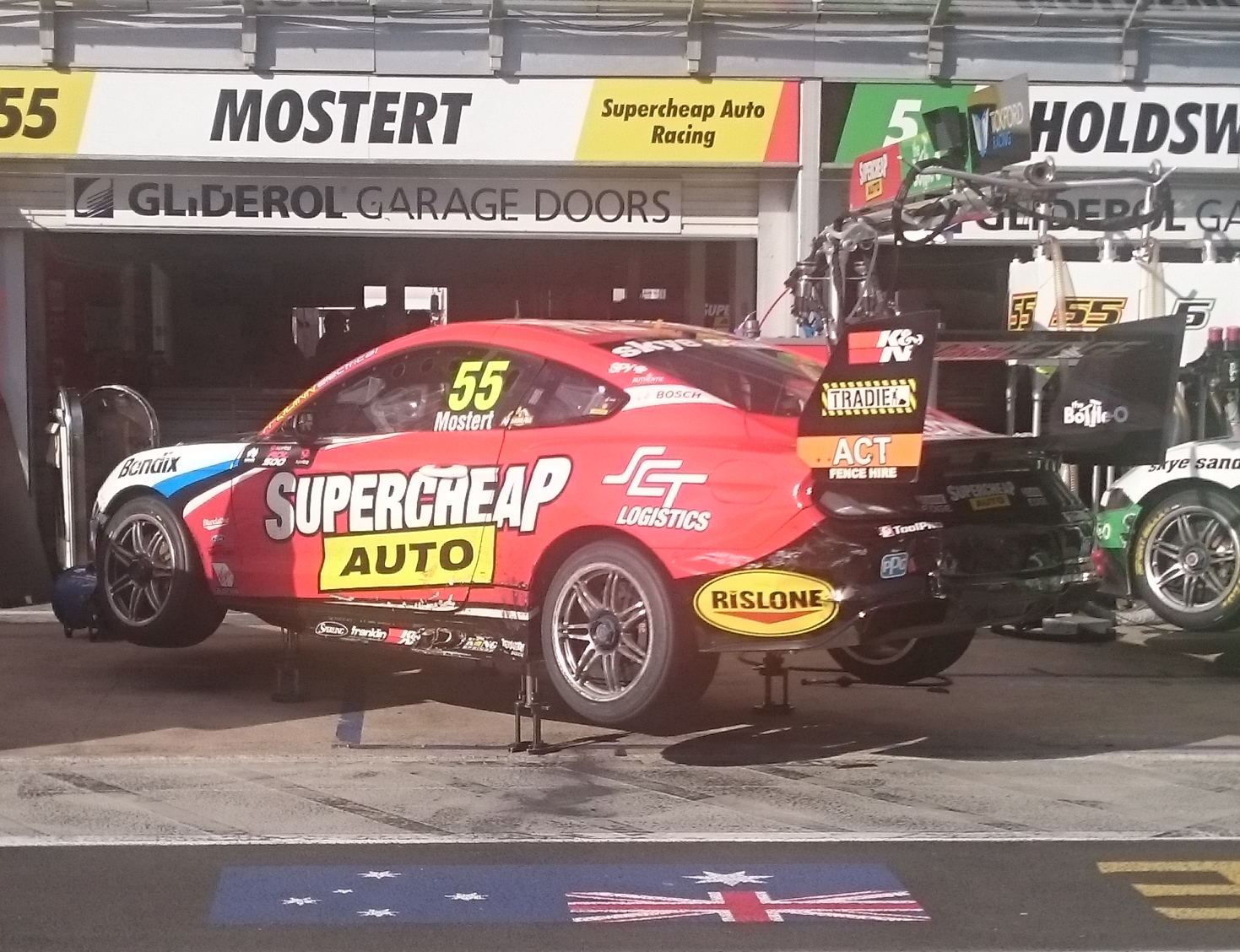
Chaz Mostert placed fifth driving a Ford Mustang GT for Tickford Racing

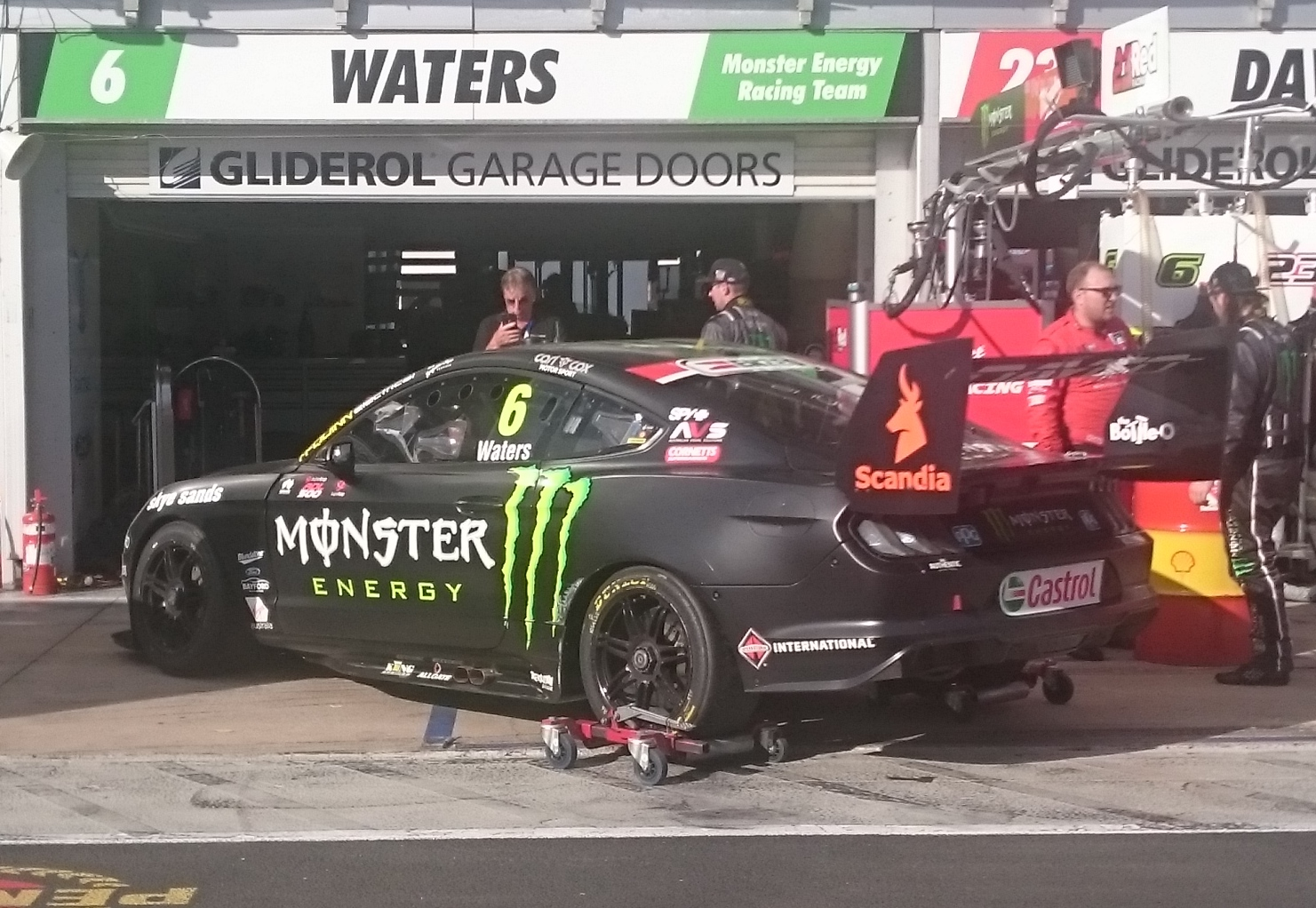
Cam Waters placed seventh driving a Ford Mustang GT for Tickford Racing

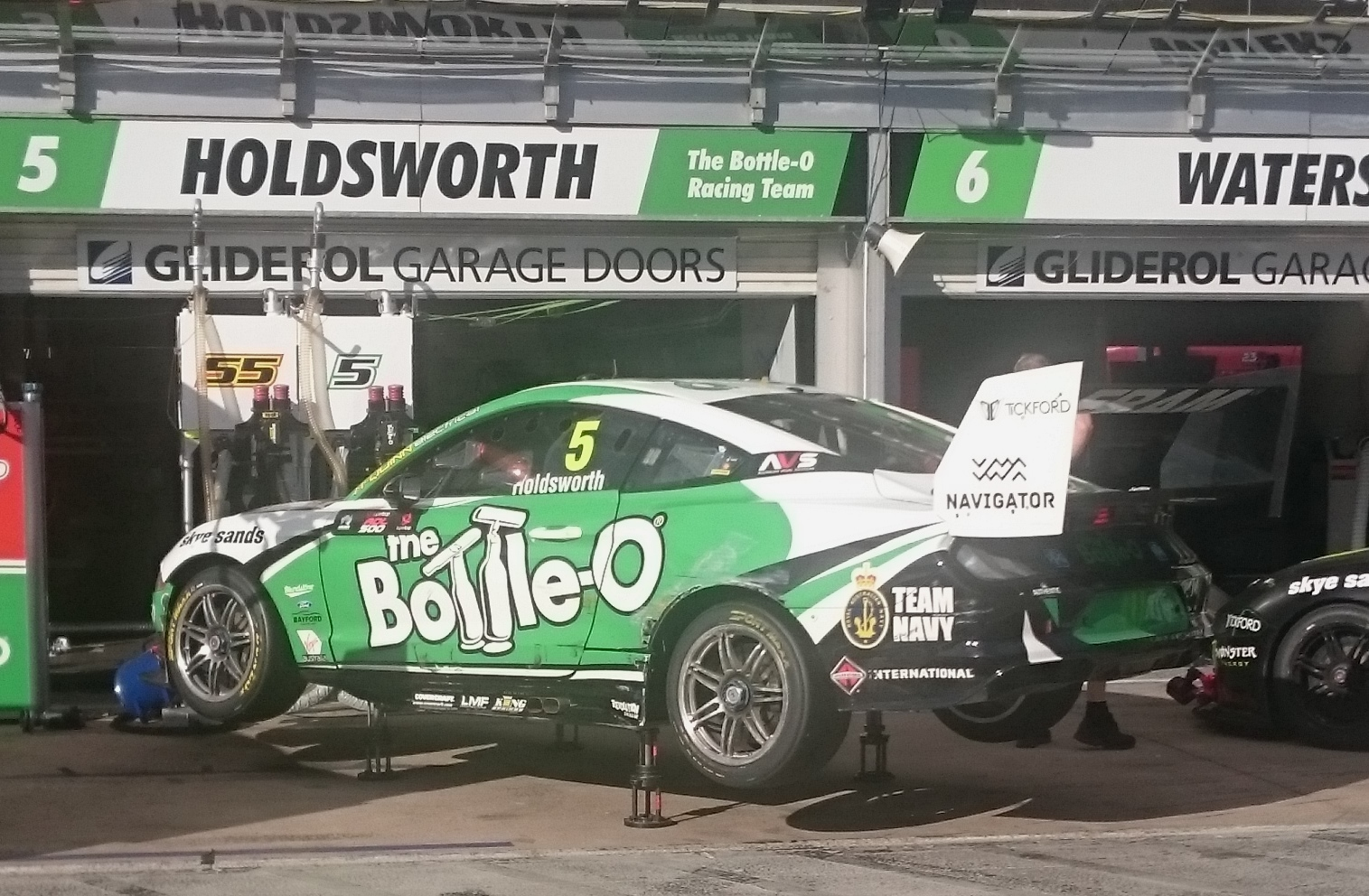
Lee Holdsworth placed tenth driving a Ford Mustang GT for Tickford Racing
