= Darwin Triple Crown =

Supercars Championship event held in Darwin, Australia

(Northern Territory) Darwin Triple Crown
- Race Information
Venue	Hidden Valley Raceway
Number of times held	30
First held	1998
- Race Format
- Race 1
Laps	35
Distance	100 km
- Race 2
Laps	70
Distance	200 km
- Race 3
Laps	70
Distance	200 km
- Last Event (2026)
- Overall Winner
(Australia) Cameron Waters	Tickford Racing
- Race Winners
(Australia) Cameron Waters	Tickford Racing
(Australia) Kai Allen	Grove Racing
(Australia) Anton de Pasquale	Team 18

The Darwin Triple Crown (formally known as the Betr Darwin Triple Crown) is an annual motor racing event for Supercars, held at Hidden Valley Raceway in Darwin, Northern Territory. The event has been a regular part of the Supercars Championship—and its previous incarnations, the Australian Touring Car Championship, Shell Championship Series and V8 Supercars Championship—since 1998.

== Format ==
The event is held over three days, from Friday to Sunday. On Friday, two thirty-minute practice sessions are held. On Saturday, a three-part knock-out qualifying session is then held, determining the grid for the 100 kilometre race to follow. Sunday features two fifteen-minute qualifying sessions that set the grid for each of the day's two 100 km races.

The event has been known as the Triple Crown since 2006, which originally referred to the three races in the weekend format of the time. Currently, the title refers to the two races during the event and the first qualifying session. The Triple Crown remained elusive until Scott McLaughlin was fastest in the top ten shootout and won both races in 2019. From 2020, the Triple Crown trophy was awarded to the driver that scored the most points across the weekend.

== History ==
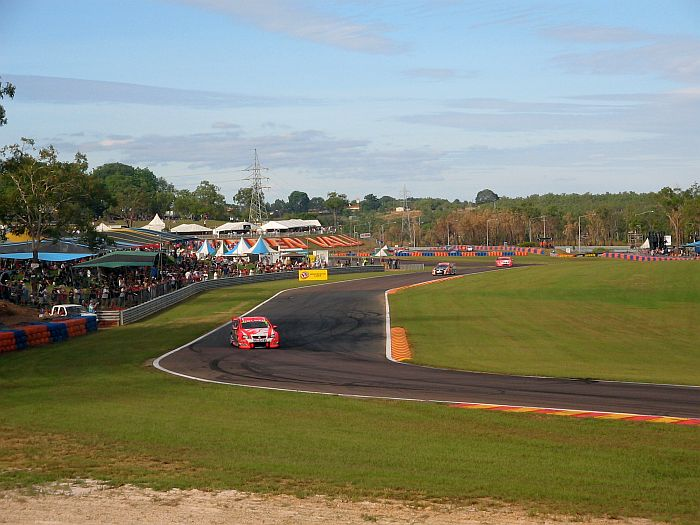
Mark Skaife during the 2007 Skycity Triple Crown.

Hidden Valley Raceway had existed for several years prior to being upgraded for its first national championship event in 1998, a round of the Australian Touring Car Championship (ATCC). Mark Skaife had been on course to take victory in the opening race when an engine issue on the final lap allowed teammate Craig Lowndes past, with Skaife finishing 2nd. Lowndes' car then failed to fire prior to the start of the second race and both he and Skaife failed to make the grid, leaving the front row empty. Russell Ingall, who had a stop-go penalty in the first race for spinning Jason Bright, charged from 13th on the grid to take victory and went on to win the inaugural round with another win in race three of the weekend. In 1999, Bright took his first career round win in what was Ford's only round win of the year. It was also the first round win for Stone Brothers Racing, who saw further success at the event in 2001 when Marcos Ambrose scored his first round win, despite not winning a race over the weekend.

In 2004, Ambrose made contact while attempting to overtake Skaife for the lead on the final corner of the race, delaying both and granting victory to Ambrose's teammate Ingall. In the following race, Ambrose then spun Ingall off on the first corner of the race. Todd Kelly went on to win the round, his first of two consecutive event wins. Michael Caruso took his first Supercars race win at the event in 2009, holding off a late charge from Alex Davison. At a late safety car restart in the first race of the 2011 event, the top four tangled into turn one, allowing fifth-placed Rick Kelly to take the race win. In 2013 Jonathon Webb, driving for his family team Tekno Autosports, won his first career round. At the 2015 event, Lowndes became the first to achieve 100 race wins in ATCC and Supercars, capitalising on a collision between Rick Kelly and Fabian Coulthard on the opening lap. In 2016, Caruso provided Nissan with their first round victory since 1992. At the same event, Lee Holdsworth suffered a broken pelvis in a first lap accident, forcing him out of the next three events.

From 2017 to 2019, Scott McLaughlin became the first driver to win three consecutive events in Darwin. Most notably, this included McLaughlin becoming the first driver to win the Triple Crown in 2019, qualifying fastest in the top ten shootout (albeit only by a margin of under two hundredths of a second) and winning both races for DJR Team Penske. The Triple Crown was again awarded in 2020 but only due to a change in criteria which saw the trophy guaranteed to be awarded to the round winner. Jamie Whincup tied for points with Fabian Coulthard but won the trophy on countback, meanwhile Anton de Pasquale won his first championship race in the first race of the weekend. In addition to the Triple Crown, Hidden Valley hosted a second event in consecutive weeks, known as the Darwin SuperSprint, as part of the calendar changes caused by the COVID-19 pandemic. In 2021, it was announced the event would become the championship's Indigenous Round, with some teams running special liveries for the event. Over the weekend, the event also incorporated Superbikes and drag racing with Supercars, for the first time since the Winfield Triple Challenge events at Sydney Motorsport Park in the early 1990s.

In 2025, the rules again changed to guarantee the award of the Triple Crown - however Broc Feeney won all three races and took three pole positions to win the award by both the existing and new definition.

== Winners ==
Year	Driver	Team	Car	Report
1998	(Australia) Russell Ingall	Perkins Engineering	Holden VT Commodore	
1999	(Australia) Jason Bright	Stone Brothers Racing	Ford AU Falcon	
2000	(Australia) Mark Skaife	Holden Racing Team	Holden VT Commodore	
2001	(Australia) Marcos Ambrose	Stone Brothers Racing	Ford AU Falcon	Report
2002	(Australia) Mark Skaife	Holden Racing Team	Holden VX Commodore	
2003	(Australia) Marcos Ambrose	Stone Brothers Racing	Ford BA Falcon	
2004	(Australia) Todd Kelly	Holden Racing Team	Holden VY Commodore	
2005	(Australia) Todd Kelly	Holden Racing Team	Holden VZ Commodore	
2006	(Australia) Craig Lowndes	Triple Eight Race Engineering	Ford BA Falcon	
2007	(Australia) Craig Lowndes	Triple Eight Race Engineering	Ford BF Falcon	Report
2008	(New Zealand) Steven Richards	Ford Performance Racing	Ford BF Falcon	Report
2009	(Australia) Craig Lowndes	Triple Eight Race Engineering	Ford FG Falcon	Report
2010	(Australia) Jamie Whincup	Triple Eight Race Engineering	Holden VE Commodore	Report
2011	(Australia) Craig Lowndes	Triple Eight Race Engineering	Holden VE Commodore	Report
2012	(Australia) Jamie Whincup	Triple Eight Race Engineering	Holden VE Commodore	Report
2013	(Australia) Jonathon Webb	Tekno Autosports	Holden VF Commodore	Report
2014	(Australia) Jamie Whincup	Triple Eight Race Engineering	Holden VF Commodore	Report
2015	(Australia) Chaz Mostert	Prodrive Racing Australia	Ford FG X Falcon	Report
2016	(Australia) Michael Caruso	Nissan Motorsport	Nissan Altima L33	Report
2017	(New Zealand) Scott McLaughlin	DJR Team Penske	Ford FG X Falcon	Report
2018	(New Zealand) Scott McLaughlin	DJR Team Penske	Ford FG X Falcon	Report
2019	(New Zealand) Scott McLaughlin	DJR Team Penske	Ford Mustang GT	Report
2020^{1}	(Australia) Jamie Whincup	Triple Eight Race Engineering	Holden ZB Commodore	
2020^{1}	(New Zealand) Scott McLaughlin	DJR Team Penske	Ford Mustang GT	
2021	(Australia) Chaz Mostert	Walkinshaw Andretti United	Holden ZB Commodore	Report
2022	(Australia) Anton De Pasquale	Dick Johnson Racing	Ford Mustang GT	Report
2023	(Australia) Broc Feeney	Triple Eight Race Engineering	Chevrolet Camaro ZL1-1LE	
2024	(Australia) Broc Feeney	Triple Eight Race Engineering	Chevrolet Camaro ZL1-1LE	
2025	(Australia) Broc Feeney	Triple Eight Race Engineering	Chevrolet Camaro ZL1-1LE	
2026	(Australia) Cameron Waters	Tickford Racing	Ford Mustang S650	

Notes

- ^1 – Hidden Valley Raceway hosted two events of the 2020 Supercars Championship, Rounds 5 and 6, in consecutive weekends.

== Multiple winners ==
=== By driver ===
Wins	Driver	Years
4	(Australia) Craig Lowndes	2006, 2007, 2009, 2011
4	(Australia) Jamie Whincup	2010, 2012, 2014, 2020-1
4	(New Zealand) Scott McLaughlin	2017, 2018, 2019, 2020-2
3	(Australia) Broc Feeney	2023, 2024, 2025
2	(Australia) Mark Skaife	2000, 2002
2	(Australia) Marcos Ambrose	2001, 2003
2	(Australia) Todd Kelly	2004, 2005
2	(Australia) Chaz Mostert	2015, 2021

=== By team ===
Wins	Team
11	Triple Eight Race Engineering
5	Walkinshaw Andretti United^{2}
5	Dick Johnson Racing^{3}
3	Stone Brothers Racing
3	Tickford Racing^{4}

=== By manufacturer ===
Wins	Manufacturer
14	Ford
12	Holden
3	Chevrolet

Notes

- ^2 – Walkinshaw Andretti United was known as Holden Racing Team from 1990 to 2016, hence their statistics are combined.
- ^3 – Dick Johnson Racing was known as DJR Team Penske from 2015 to 2020, hence their statistics are combined.
- ^4 – Tickford Racing was known as Ford Performance Racing from 2003 to 2014, and as Prodrive Racing Australia from 2015 to 2017 hence their statistics are combined.

== Event names and sponsors ==
- 1998–2004: Hidden Valley
- 2005: Skycity V8 Supercars
- 2006–15: Skycity Triple Crown
- 2016–18: CrownBet Darwin Triple Crown
- 2019–20: BetEasy Darwin Triple Crown
- 2020: CoreStaff Darwin SuperSprint
- 2021–22: Merlin Darwin Triple Crown
- 2023–26: Betr Darwin Triple Crown

== See also ==
- List of Australian Touring Car Championship races
