= 2019 Winton SuperSprint =

2019 V8 Supercar championship race

(Victoria (state)) 2019 Winton SuperSprint
Event Information
- Round 6 of 15 in the 2019 Supercars Championship
- Date: 24–26 May 2019
- Location: Benalla, Victoria
- Venue: Winton Motor Raceway

Results
Race 1
Distance	40 laps	119.735 km
Pole position	(Australia) Chaz Mostert; Tickford Racing	1:20.6224
Winner	(New Zealand) Scott McLaughlin; DJR Team Penske	54:59.9904
Race 2
Distance	67 laps	200.556 km
Pole position	(New Zealand) Scott McLaughlin; DJR Team Penske	1:18.5233
Winner	(New Zealand) Scott McLaughlin; DJR Team Penske	1:35:22.6590

The 2019 Winton SuperSprint was a motor racing event for the Supercars Championship, held on 24-26 May 2019. The event was held at the Winton Motor Raceway near Benalla, Victoria and consisted of two races of 120 and 200 kilometres in length. It was the sixth round of fifteen in the 2019 Supercars Championship and hosted Races 13 and 14 of the season.

DJR Team Penske's Scott McLaughlin won both races, further extending his championship lead.

== Report ==
=== Background ===
==== Entry alterations ====
The event was open to wildcard entries which saw the grid expand to twenty-five cars. Brad Jones Racing entered a Holden Commodore ZB for Jack Smith, who made his second event start in the Supercars Championship, following his wildcard entry at the 2019 Tasmania SuperSprint.

Richie Stanaway withdrew from the event following Race 13 due to a neck injury. He was replaced for the remainder of the event by nominated endurance co-driver Chris Pither.
