= 2019 Darwin Triple Crown =

2019 V8 Supercar championship race

(Northern Territory) 2019 Darwin Triple Crown
Event Information
- Round 7 of 15 in the 2019 Supercars Championship
- Date: 14-16 June 2019
- Location: Darwin, Northern Territory
- Venue: Hidden Valley Raceway

Results
Race 1
Distance	42 laps	120.315 km
Pole position	(New Zealand) Scott McLaughlin; DJR Team Penske	1:06.0108
Winner	(New Zealand) Scott McLaughlin; DJR Team Penske	52:11.8539
Race 2
Distance	70 laps	200.524 km
Pole position	(New Zealand) Scott McLaughlin; DJR Team Penske	1:05.8259
Winner	(New Zealand) Scott McLaughlin; DJR Team Penske	1:21:00.4129

The 2019 Darwin Triple Crown (formally known as 2019 BetEasy Darwin Triple Crown) was a motor racing event for the Supercars Championship, held on the weekend of 14-16 June 2019. The event was held at Hidden Valley Raceway near Darwin in the Northern Territory and consisted of two races, 120 and 200 kilometres in length. It was the seventh event of fifteen in the 2019 Supercars Championship and hosted Races 15 and 16 of the season.

DJR Team Penske's Scott McLaughlin became the first driver in the history of the event to win the Triple Crown by winning both races and pole position in the Top Ten Shootout.

== Report ==
=== Background ===
==== Entry alterations ====
Brad Jones Racing entered an additional Holden Commodore ZB for Jack Smith, his third wildcard entry of the season.
