= Volvo S60 (V8 Supercar) =

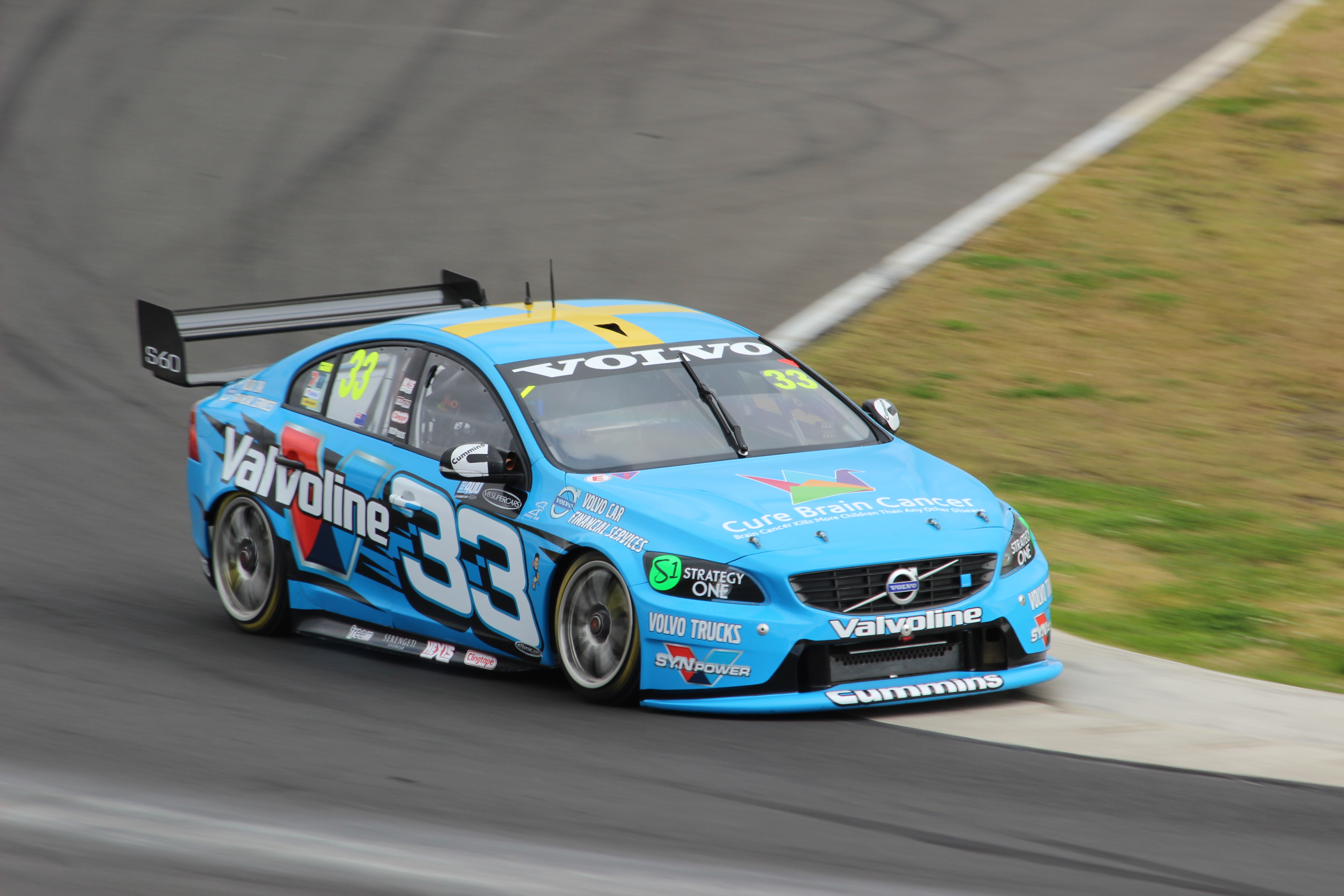
- Scott McLaughlin competing in the 2014 Sydney Motorsport Park 400.
- Category: V8 Supercars
- Constructor: Garry Rogers Motorsport; Volvo Polestar Racing

Technical specifications
- Suspension: Öhlins coilovers
- Suspension (front): Double-wishbone
- Suspension (rear): as front
- Engine: Volvo B8444S 4,989 cc (304.4 cu in) V8 (60°) naturally-aspirated, eight throttle bodies, 7,500 RPM limited, front-mounted
- Torque: 487 ft-lb
- Transmission: Xtrac transaxle, 6 forward speeds + 1 reverse manual sequential
- Power: 485 kW (659 PS; 650 hp)
- Weight: 1,410 kg (3,108.5 lb)
- Fuel: E85
- Lubricants: Valvoline
- Brakes: AP Racing 4-piston calipers and discs
- Tyres: Dunlop Sportmaxx, 18" x 11" forged aluminium rims

Competition history
- Notable entrants: Garry Rogers Motorsport
- Notable drivers: (New Zealand) Scott McLaughlin (Sweden) Robert Dahlgren (Australia) David Wall (Australia) James Moffat (France) Alexandre Prémat (Australia) Greg Ritter (New Zealand) Chris Pither (Australia) James Golding
- Debut: 2014 Adelaide 500
- First win: 2014 Perth 400 (Note: The vehicles' first race win came in the non-championship 2014 V8 Supercars Challenge at Albert Park, but this is not counted towards its official statistics.)
- Last win: 2016 Phillip Island SuperSprint
- Last event: 2016 Sydney 500
Entries	Races	Wins	Podiums
42	103	6	23
Poles	F/Laps	Titles	
17	7	0	

The Volvo S60 was a silhouette touring car built to compete in the V8 Supercars championship. Based on the second-generation Volvo S60 road car, the vehicle – designed and assembled by Garry Rogers Motorsport in conjunction with Volvo Cars and Polestar Racing – was constructed to the "Car of the Future" V8 Supercars regulations introduced in 2013, with the car used across the 2014, 2015 and 2016 seasons of Australian touring car racing.

== Background ==
V8 Supercars announced a new regulation set, titled Car of the Future, in 2010 as part of future-proofing discussions. Intended to halve costs through control parts, the series mandated a standardised chassis and roll cage combination designed to attract new manufacturers to compete alongside the existing Holden and Ford products, whilst maintaining the popular 5.0L V8 engines – the base platforms would then be homologated to achieve technical parity, and teams allowed to develop certain components on top of that. The regulation set came into effect in 2013, initially planned to be 2012, with Nissan and Mercedes-AMG models confirmed to participate; Nissan as a factory effort using Altima L33s homologated by Kelly Racing, and Erebus Motorsport building E63-derived models without factory support.

Volvo announced their entry into V8 Supercars in June 2013, partnering with Garry Rogers Motorsport on a three-year deal – marking the brands' first foray into Australian touring car racing since it won the 1986 championship with Robbie Francevic driving a 240T for Mark Petch Motorsport and the Volvo Dealer Team. Rogers had been in "very, very close" discussions with Chrysler about using the 300C model since January 2012, before ultimately signing with the Swedish manufacturer. The second-generation S60 model was chosen to represent the brand from 2014, using panels and fixings based on the original design of the S60 but modified in various places (such as the raising and pushing back of the roofline) to fit the control chassis. The V8 Supercar included the fitment of the Yamaha-designed B8444S engine, with an increased bore and stroke from 4.4L to 5.0L to meet series requirements – its flat-plane crank and 60° cylinder block produced a distinctive, deeper tone compared to its pushrod 90° counterparts.

== Competition history ==
=== 2014 ===
The car was launched on 13 February 2014, having been driven via police escort over the Sydney Harbour Bridge at sunrise. It was liveried predominantly in Volvo's cyan, with a Swedish flag on the roof and black patches on the doors – primary sponsorship came from long-time Garry Rogers supporter Valvoline. Scott McLaughlin was retained by GRM for his sophomore season in the category, and was joined by long-serving Volvo Sweden factory driver Robert Dahlgren; reigning STCC champion Thed Björk had requested the drive, but was instead tasked with testing Volvo's upcoming WTCC TC1 car based on the same road-going model. The cars' liveries received a minor tweak mid-season, with NASCAR-style door numbers added to the #33 and #34 at the Ipswich and Eastern Creek rounds respectively.

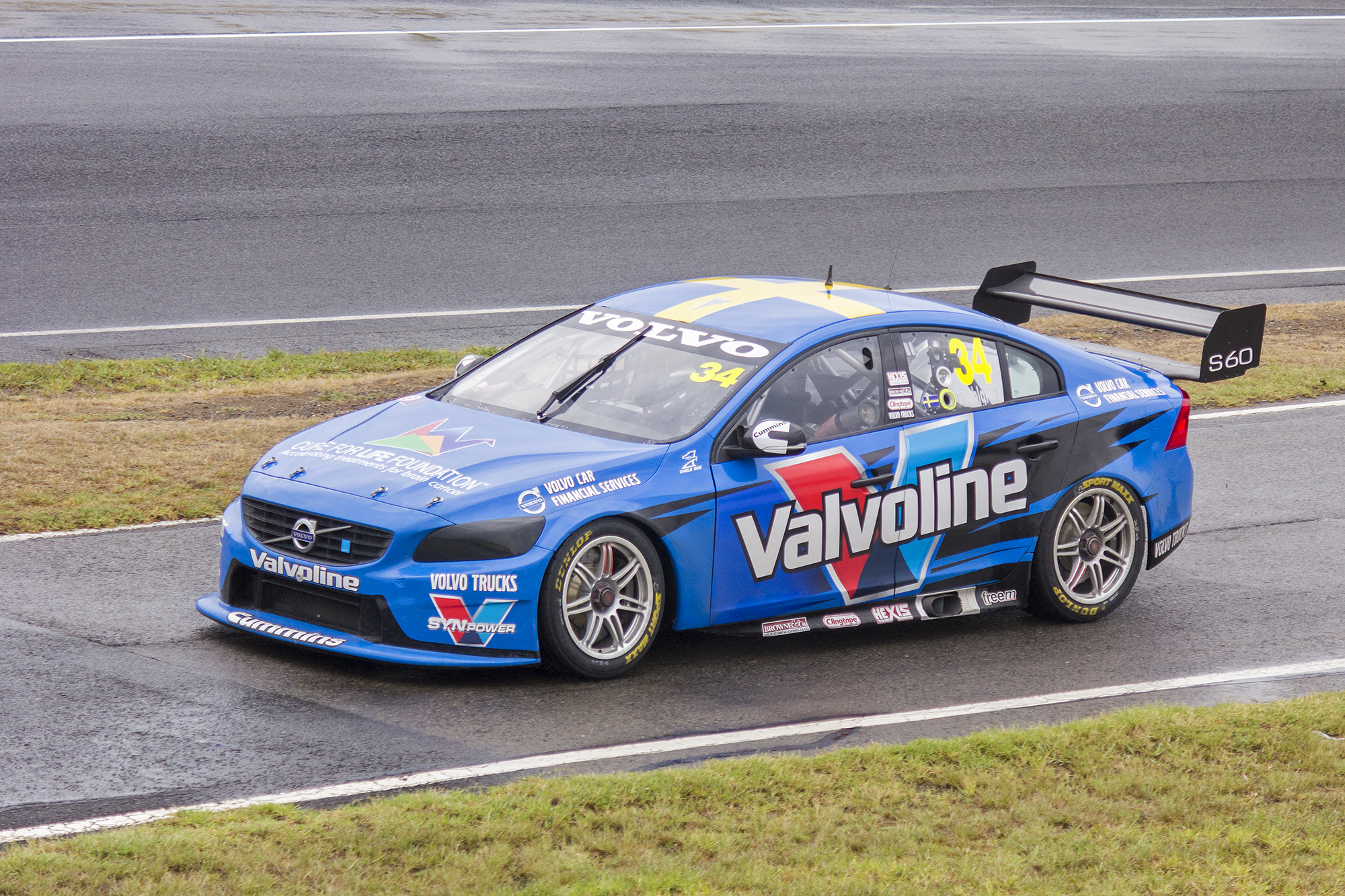
Robert Dahlgren at the V8 Supercars pre-season test in 2014.

The cars' first outings were surrounded by controversy, as rivals claimed it had an aerodynamic and power advantage. This was exacerbated by the B8444S engine, which was substituted with a Holden Commodore VF-derived Chevrolet unit during homologation at RAAF Base East Sale, producing so much power in the pre-season test at Sydney Motorsport Park that it was catching rival cars without reaching full throttle. At the opening round in Adelaide, McLaughlin qualified 5th and 2nd for the opening two races whilst Dahlgren qualified outside the top 20. Having finished the first race seventh, McLaughlin then held off a late charge from Jamie Whincup in the evening heat to finish 2nd behind Craig Lowndes. Both cars retired from the final race of the weekend with mechanical problems; Dahlgren with an engine failure, and McLaughlin with electrical issues. McLaughlin then claimed the S60's first race win in the final heat of the non-championship V8 Supercars Challenge, a support event to the Australian Grand Prix.

Ahead of the second round in Tasmania, Volvo were instructed to move 20kg of ballast in their engine bay to adjust its centre of gravity. McLaughlin scored top 10 finishes in all three races at Symmons Plains, before both cars suffered a spate of mechanical failures at Winton. McLaughlin then claimed two pole positions and two podiums in his home event in New Zealand, before taking the first championship race win for the S60 in Perth despite a cracked header. Following 5 out of 6 top-ten finishes for McLaughlin across Darwin and Townsville, the Kiwi then collided with Michael Caruso in a battle for the lead at Queensland Raceway. At the following round in Western Sydney, McLaughlin had an engine failure early in the first race before losing a wheel in the second after starting from pole, with the issues compounded after Dahlgren crashed out of the second race and had to sit out the remainder of the weekend – McLaughlin then bounced back to win the Sunday race, narrowly beating Nick Percat.

McLaughlin and Dahlgren were joined by Alexandre Prémat and Greg Ritter for the endurance races. McLaughlin and Prémat finished 8th at Sandown following an early battle with David Reynolds. McLaughlin and Prémat then led 70 of the first 120 laps at the Bathurst 1000 before Dahlgren crashed at the Cutting, and on the subsequent safety car restart McLaughlin then crashed in the same place – #33 was ultimately the last classified finisher, 11 laps down in 17th. Dahlgren finished a season-best 12th in the first race on the Gold Coast, whilst McLaughlin/Prémat scored pole and finished 2nd in the final enduro of the season. McLaughlin then won the first race at Phillip Island ahead of Lowndes and Whincup, before taking a last-gasp win in the third race of the weekend after Garth Tander ran out of fuel in the final metres. The final round at Sydney Olympic Park was overshadowed by stormy weather, but McLaughlin managed to equal Whincup on 10 pole positions apiece for the season in the final qualifying session.

McLaughlin finished the 2014 drivers' championship in 5th, and Dahlgren 25th (last of the regular drivers). Garry Rogers Motorsport finished 6th in the teams' championship, narrowly beating Erebus Motorsport by 23 points. Prior to the final round of the season, Dahlgren was confirmed to be leaving the team at seasons' end and returning to Sweden.

=== 2015 ===
In November 2014, Dick Johnson Racing's David Wall was confirmed to replace Dahlgren at Garry Rogers Motorsport for the 2015 season. The 2015 livery was launched on 6 February, featuring a predominantly similar design but with Wilson Security replacing Valvoline as the primary backer – from the Townsville round onwards (excluding the Bathurst 1000), Wall's car was primarily sponsored by Payce Consolidated. Volvo had expressed interest in expanding to four cars in mid-2014, but ultimately opted against it in order to "focus on the [car] speed". In 2021, Lee Holdsworth confirmed that Erebus Motorsport had been in line to switch from Mercedes to Volvo for the 2015 season before the deal collapsed at Bathurst.

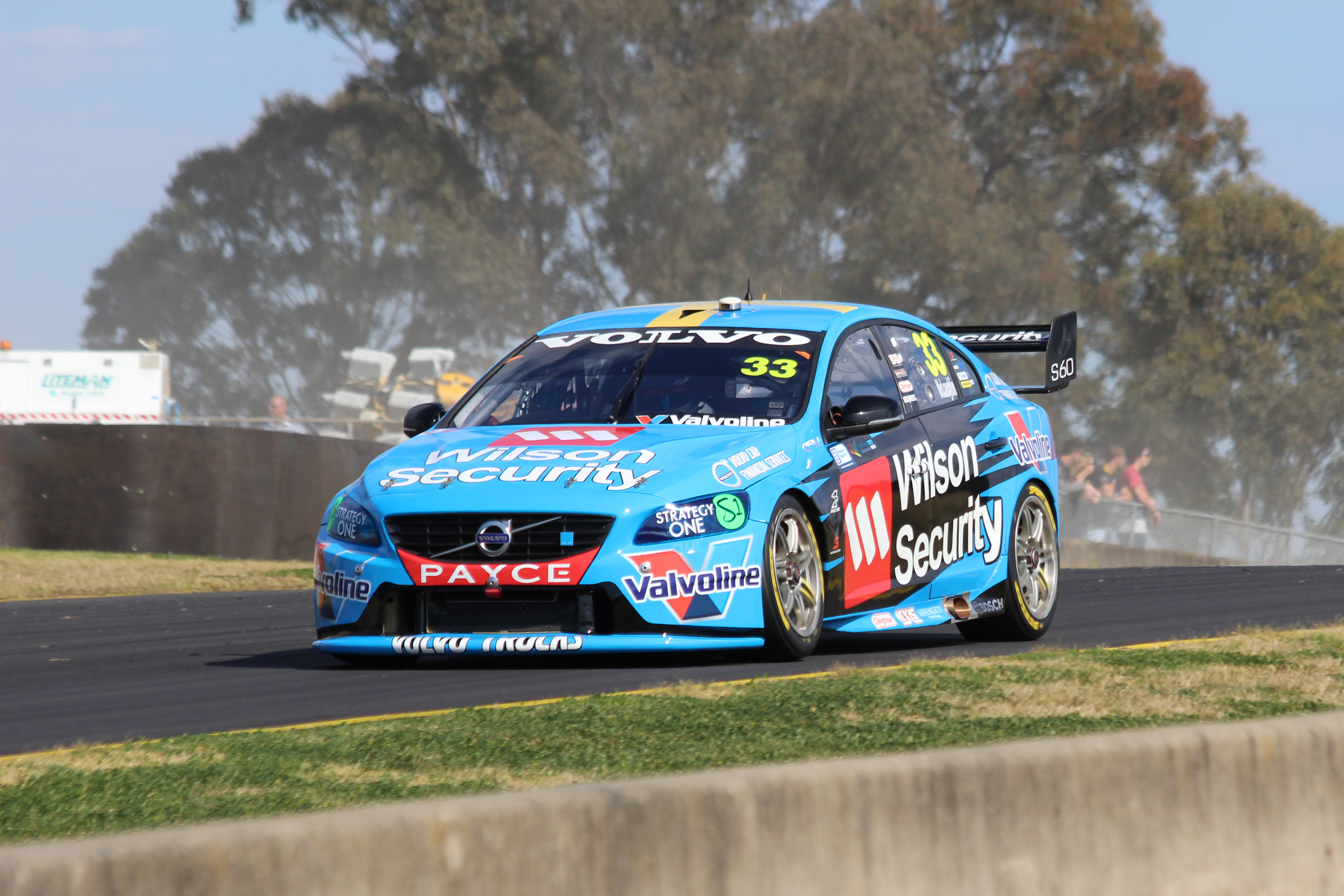
McLaughlin competing in the 2015 Sydney SuperSprint.

McLaughlin did not start the opening race of the season after suffering an oil pump failure on the warm-up lap. The team could only muster a best finish of 9th during the rest of the Adelaide weekend, a result replicated at Symmons Plains after McLaughlin suffered an engine failure in the first race of the weekend. Prior to Symmons Plains, Chris Pither replaced Wall at the non-championship Australian Grand Prix event after the Sydneysider suffered burns in Adelaide. Only three top-ten finishes followed in the next nine races; McLaughlin then finished 4th in the first race in Townsville before claiming the S60's first pole position of the season in the second race, however the team were denied another strong finish after his car threw a power steering belt during the race. The Townsville results did lead to a minor turnaround in fortunes, with McLaughlin taking a podium finish in Ipswich as well as top-five finishes in two of the races at Eastern Creek.

McLaughlin and Prémat again teamed up for the endurance races, whilst Pither joined Wall in Car #34. McLaughlin and Prémat finished 14th at Sandown after a mistake in the pit-stop led to the car leaving its bay with the air-jack still attached. Wall and Pither retired from Bathurst after suffering another engine failure inside the first 100km, whilst McLaughlin and Prémat managed a fifth-place finish having been in contention throughout. McLaughlin then claimed another pole position on the Gold Coast, leading Volvo Global to express "positivity" about continuing in the series beyond 2016 despite dismal race results that weekend. Following the Gold Coast round, Wall was confirmed to be out of a full-time drive at the end of the season. McLaughlin then finished the season with eight top-ten finishes in the last nine races, including four podiums and two pole positions – Wall scored his best race result, a 15th place, in the penultimate round at Phillip Island. McLaughlin and Wall finished 8th and 23rd in the drivers' championship, whilst GRM finished 7th in the teams' championship.

=== 2016 ===
In November 2015, James Moffat from Nissan Motorsport was confirmed as David Wall's replacement for 2016. The livery was launched on 20 February, retaining the same sponsors but replacing the black patches with white cut-out sections.

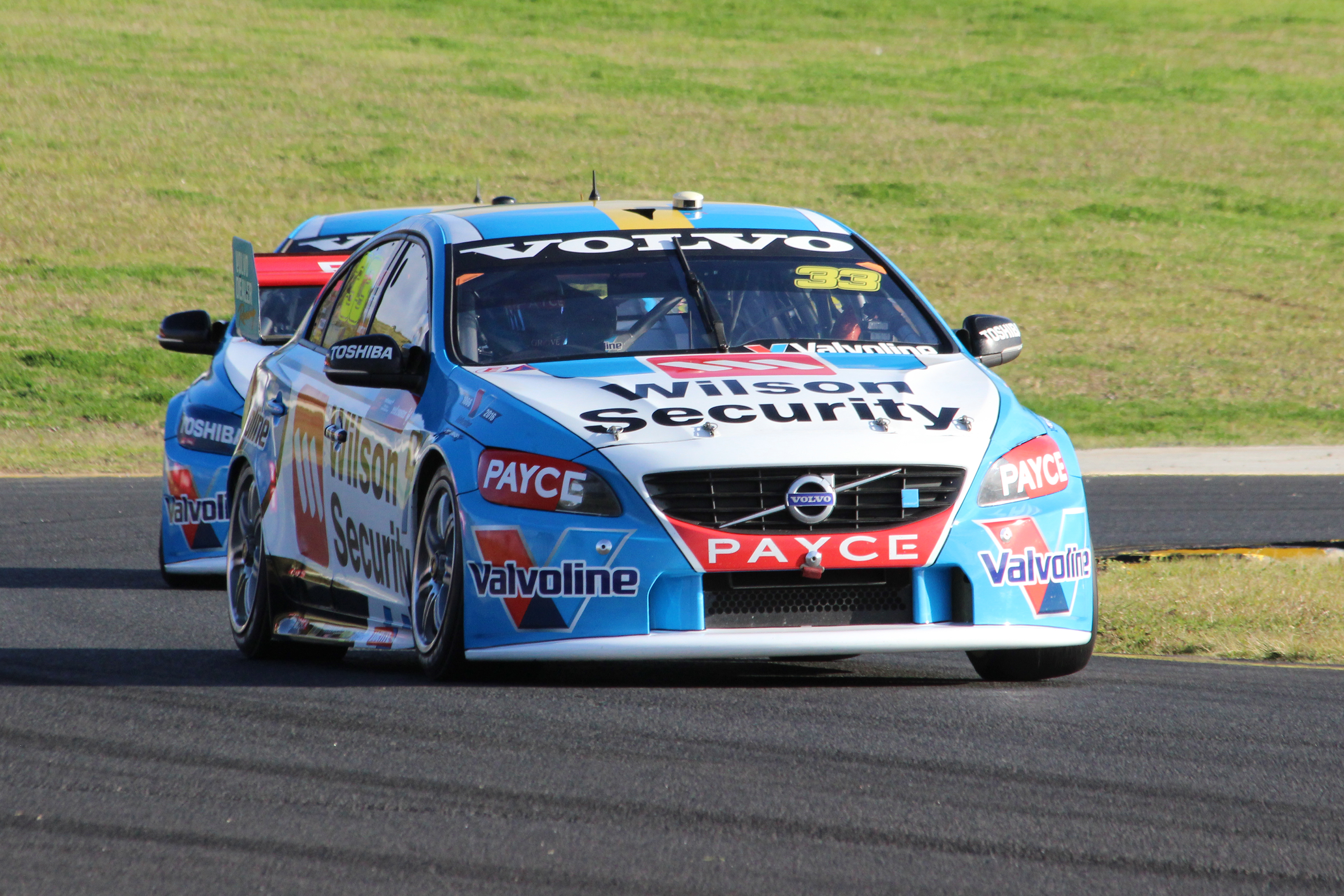
McLaughlin competing in the 2016 Sydney SuperSprint.

McLaughlin started the season with a pair of fourth-places in Adelaide, and scored another one at the following round in Launceston. McLaughlin then dominated the next round at Phillip Island, taking a grand slam in both races whilst team-mate Moffat finished 7th in the first race. Following the success, Volvo renewed their support for another three seasons on 27 April, whilst McLaughlin was given a cameo drive for Volvo in the STCC season-opener on 1 May.

On 4 May, a week after Volvo's support was renewed, the Swedish company backflipped on the deal and opted to quit the category at the end of the season. Following suggestions that GRM could run the existing cars privately for 2017 and beyond, Cyan Racing clarified that all Volvo IP – including chassis, engines and panels – had to be shipped to Sweden at the conclusion of the season.

Two podiums in two events followed for McLaughlin in Perth and Winton. After power steering issues for Moffat in Darwin and a collision for McLaughlin with Dale Wood in Townsville, at least one car finished in the top ten in the four races across Ipswich and Eastern Creek – although Moffat was denied a strong finish in Race 19 after spinning Shane van Gisbergen.

For the endurance races, McLaughlin was joined by former team-mate Wall, whilst GRM protégé James Golding made his début alongside Moffat. The Sandown 500 marked the series first "Retro Round", and both Volvos were re-liveried to honour their 1986 championship win – rookie Golding suffered a heavy puncture-induced crash at the end of the back straight on the opening lap, leading to a red flag, whilst McLaughlin and Wall finished 4th. The throwback livery was retained for Bathurst, where McLaughlin qualified on the front row; however, Moffat suffered a fiery engine failure just past the 100-lap mark, whilst McLaughlin was taken out of contention in a controversial late-race crash involving Whincup and Tander. Having reverted both cars back to the regular livery, McLaughlin and Wall rounded out the Enduro Cup with two podiums on the Gold Coast, whilst Moffat and Golding also scored a top-five finish in the first race – McLaughlin also gained viral notoriety during this event after he made an out-of-control pass on Mark Winterbottom.

The S60s rounded out their tenure in V8 Supercars with top-ten finishes in all of the last six races, including two podiums for McLaughlin at Pukekohe. McLaughlin's strong finish to the season saw him finish 3rd in the drivers' championship ahead of Lowndes, whilst Moffat finished 20th outright after two top-tens in the last three races – Garry Rogers Motorsport meanwhile claimed 3rd in the teams' championship, their best teams' championship result since 2010.

=== Aftermath ===
Following the conclusion of the 2016 season, two of the three chassis used in the Volvo program – as well as the associated Volvo componentry – were sent to Sweden. One bare chassis remained in Australia as a reserve for GRM, whilst the other two cars went into Volvo and Cyan Racing's museum collections in Gothenburg.

Having run Holden Commodore VFs in the first season of Car of the Future regulations in 2013, GRM reverted to the Commodores for the 2017 season. Scott McLaughlin was poached by DJR Team Penske following Volvo's exit, and he was replaced with former GRM driver Garth Tander.

In 2024, GRM director Barry Rogers claimed that the project had been set back by culture clashes between Volvo Sweden and the "ocker-type" GRM outfit, and that both sides were "protective" of their IP. Both parties however admitted that Volvo Cars in Australia had benefitted from the program, with a 62% increase in vehicle sales in the first half of 2014.

== Complete V8 Supercars results ==
=== No. 33 car ===
V8 Supercars results
Year	Drivers	1	2	3	4	5	6	7	8	9	10	11	12	13	14	15	16	17	18	19	20	21	22	23	24	25	26	27	28	29	30	31	32	33	34	35	36	37	38	Pos.	Pts
2014	(New Zealand) Scott McLaughlin	ADE; R1; 7	ADE; R2; 2	ADE; R3; Ret	SYM; R4; 5	SYM; R5; 4	SYM; R6; 6	WIN; R7; Ret	WIN; R8; 25	WIN; R9; 16	PUK; R10; 8	PUK; R11; 6	PUK; R12; 3	PUK; R13; 2	BAR; R14; 1	BAR; R15; 4	BAR; R16; 17	HID; R17; 4	HID; R18; 5	HID; R19; 8	TOW; R20; 6	TOW; R21; 14	TOW; R22; 9	QLD; R23; 3	QLD; R24; 19	QLD; R25; 19	SMP; R26; Ret	SMP; R27; Ret	SMP; R28; 1	SAN; R29; 8	BAT; R30; 17	SUR; R31; 7	SUR; R32; 2	PHI; R33; 1	PHI; R34; 6	PHI; R35; 1	SYD; R36; 4	SYD; R37; 3	SYD; R38; 8	5th	2509
2014	(France) Alexandre Prémat																													SAN; R29; 8	BAT; R30; 17	SUR; R31; 7	SUR; R32; 2							30th	522
2015	(New Zealand) Scott McLaughlin	ADE; R1; DNS	ADE; R2; 9	ADE; R3; 18	SYM; R4; Ret	SYM; R5; 9	SYM; R6; 7	BAR; R7; 11	BAR; R8; Ret	BAR; R9; 18	WIN; R10; 25	WIN; R11; 9	WIN; R12; 9	HID; R13; Ret	HID; R14; 9	HID; R15; 11	TOW; R16; 4	TOW; R17; Ret	QLD; R18; 2	QLD; R19; 9	QLD; R20; 13	SMP; R21; 8	SMP; R22; 4	SMP; R23; 5	SAN; R24; 14	BAT; R25; 5	SUR; R26; 21	SUR; R27; 6	PUK; R28; 9	PUK; R29; 3	PUK; R30; 6	PHI; R31; 3	PHI; R32; 2	PHI; R33; 2	SYD; R34; 8	SYD; R35; 5	SYD; R36; 19			8th	2205
2015	(France) Alexandre Prémat																								SAN; R24; 14	BAT; R25; 5	SUR; R26; 21	SUR; R27; 6												35th	492
2016	(New Zealand) Scott McLaughlin	ADE; R1; 4	ADE; R2; 4	ADE; R3; 12	SYM; R4; 26	SYM; R5; 4	PHI; R6; 1	PHI; R7; 1	BAR; R8; 11	BAR; R9; 2	WIN; R10; 2	WIN; R11; 11	HID; R12; 10	HID; R13; 7	TOW; R14; 24	TOW; R15; 5	QLD; R16; 15	QLD; R17; 6	SMP; R18; 5	SMP; R19; 6	SAN; R20; 4	BAT; R21; 15	SUR; R22; 2	SUR; R23; 3	PUK; R24; 3	PUK; R25; 7	PUK; R26; 7	PUK; R27; 3	SYD; R28; 4	SYD; R29; 5										3rd	2806
2016	(Australia) David Wall																				SAN; R20; 4	BAT; R21; 15	SUR; R22; 2	SUR; R23; 3																29th	602

=== No. 34 car ===
V8 Supercars results
Year	Drivers	1	2	3	4	5	6	7	8	9	10	11	12	13	14	15	16	17	18	19	20	21	22	23	24	25	26	27	28	29	30	31	32	33	34	35	36	37	38	Pos.	Pts
2014	(Sweden) Robert Dahlgren	ADE; R1; 21	ADE; R2; 23	ADE; R3; Ret	SYM; R4; 20	SYM; R5; 16	SYM; R6; 23	WIN; R7; Ret	WIN; R8; 24	WIN; R9; 24	PUK; R10; 22	PUK; R11; Ret	PUK; R12; 21	PUK; R13; 23	BAR; R14; 24	BAR; R15; 24	BAR; R16; 21	HID; R17; 23	HID; R18; 18	HID; R19; Ret	TOW; R20; 19	TOW; R21; 22	TOW; R22; 22	QLD; R23; 23	QLD; R24; 22	QLD; R25; 16	SMP; R26; 19	SMP; R27; Ret	SMP; R28; DNS	SAN; R29; 17	BAT; R30; Ret	SUR; R31; 13	SUR; R32; 17	PHI; R33; 22	PHI; R34; 23	PHI; R35; 21	SYD; R36; 18	SYD; R37; 18	SYD; R38; Ret	25th	921
2014	(Australia) Greg Ritter																													SAN; R29; 17	BAT; R30; Ret	SUR; R31; 13	SUR; R32; 17							46th	234
2015	(Australia) David Wall	ADE; R1; 17	ADE; R2; 15	ADE; R3; 16	SYM; R4; 20	SYM; R5; 20	SYM; R6; Ret	BAR; R7; 23	BAR; R8; 22	BAR; R9; 21	WIN; R10; 21	WIN; R11; 19	WIN; R12; 18	HID; R13; 15	HID; R14; 17	HID; R15; 20	TOW; R16; 18	TOW; R17; 22	QLD; R18; 22	QLD; R19; 19	QLD; R20; 20	SMP; R21; 22	SMP; R22; 20	SMP; R23; 23	SAN; R24; 21	BAT; R25; Ret	SUR; R26; 16	SUR; R27; Ret	PUK; R28; 18	PUK; R29; 22	PUK; R30; 20	PHI; R31; 23	PHI; R32; 23	PHI; R33; 15	SYD; R34; 19	SYD; R35; 19	SYD; R36; 17			23rd	1118
2015	(New Zealand) Chris Pither																								SAN; R24; 21	BAT; R25; Ret	SUR; R26; 16	SUR; R27; Ret				driver switched teams								48th‡	264‡
2016	(Australia) James Moffat	ADE; R1; 17	ADE; R2; 15	ADE; R3; 22	SYM; R4; 20	SYM; R5; 16	PHI; R6; 7	PHI; R7; 15	BAR; R8; 14	BAR; R9; 17	WIN; R10; 26	WIN; R11; 19	HID; R12; Ret	HID; R13; 10	TOW; R14; 17	TOW; R15; 19	QLD; R16; 9	QLD; R17; 11	SMP; R18; 12	SMP; R19; 18	SAN; R20; Ret	BAT; R21; Ret	SUR; R22; 5	SUR; R23; 12	PUK; R24; 20	PUK; R25; 14	PUK; R26; 12	PUK; R27; 10	SYD; R28; 24	SYD; R29; 10										20th	1419
2016	(Australia) James Golding																				SAN; R20; Ret	BAT; R21; Ret	SUR; R22; 5	SUR; R23; 12																52nd	180

- ‡ – Includes points scored with other teams.

== In popular culture ==
The Volvo S60 V8 Supercar appeared as a playable vehicle in Forza Motorsport 6 alongside other V8 Supercar models from the 2015 season.

== See also ==
- Mercedes-Benz E63 AMG (V8 Supercar)
