= 2014 V8 Supercar season =

Seasons
- ← 2013 2015 →

The 2014 V8 Supercar season was the eighteenth year in which V8 Supercars contested the senior Australian touring car series. It was the 55th year of touring car racing in Australia since the first runnings of the Australian Touring Car Championship, now known as the International V8 Supercars Championship, and the fore-runner of the present day Bathurst 1000, the Armstrong 500.

The season began on 27 February at the Adelaide Street Circuit and finished on 7 December at the Homebush Street Circuit. 2014 featured the eighteenth V8 Supercar Championship, consisting of 38 races at 14 events covering all six states and the Northern Territory of Australia as well as an event in New Zealand. There was also a stand-alone event supporting the 2014 Australian Grand Prix. The season also featured the fifteenth second-tier Dunlop V8 Supercar Series, contested over seven rounds. For the seventh time a third-tier series was run, the Kumho Tyres V8 Touring Car Series.

== Race calendar ==
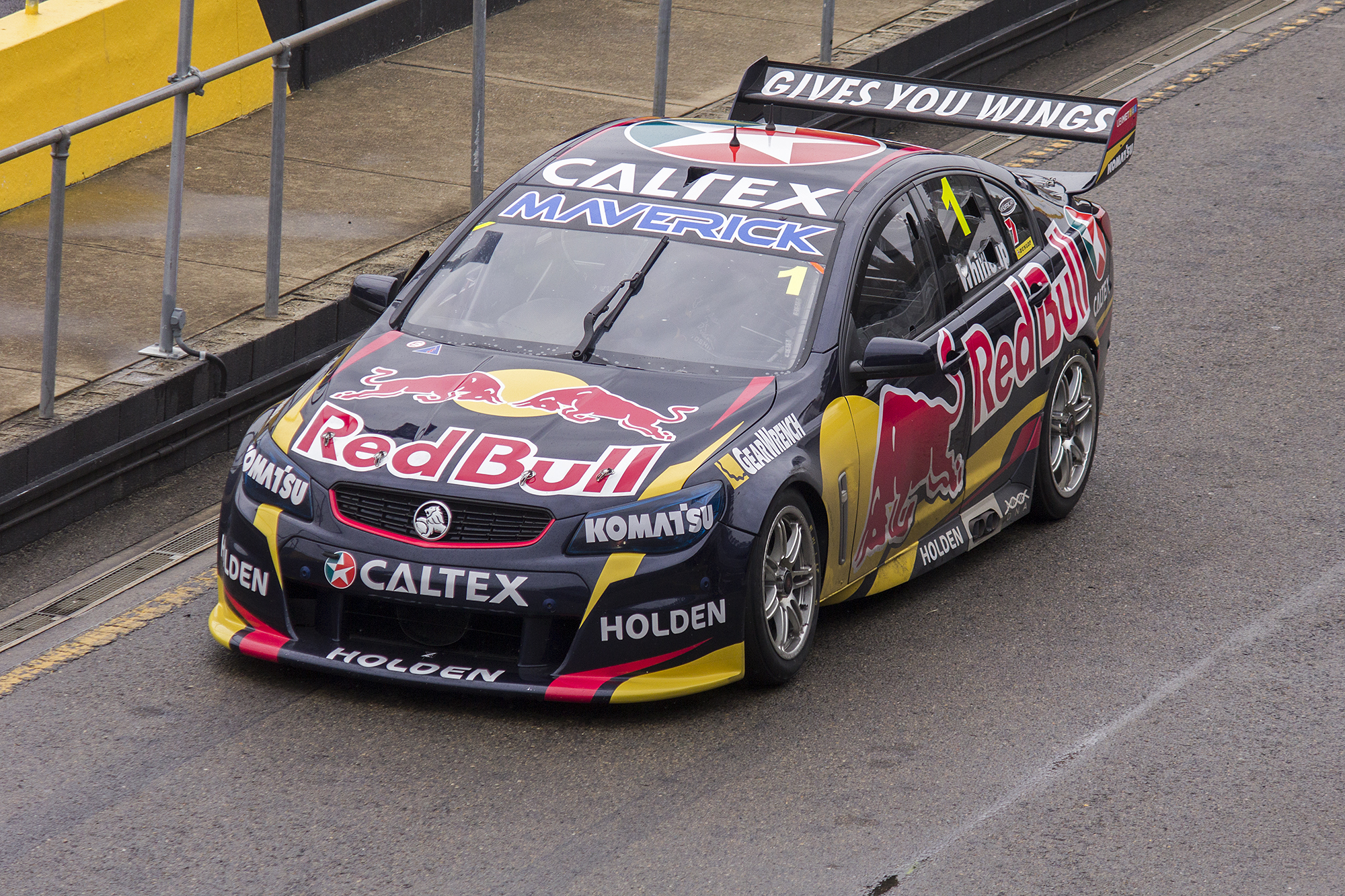
Jamie Whincup won the 2014 International V8 Supercars Championship.

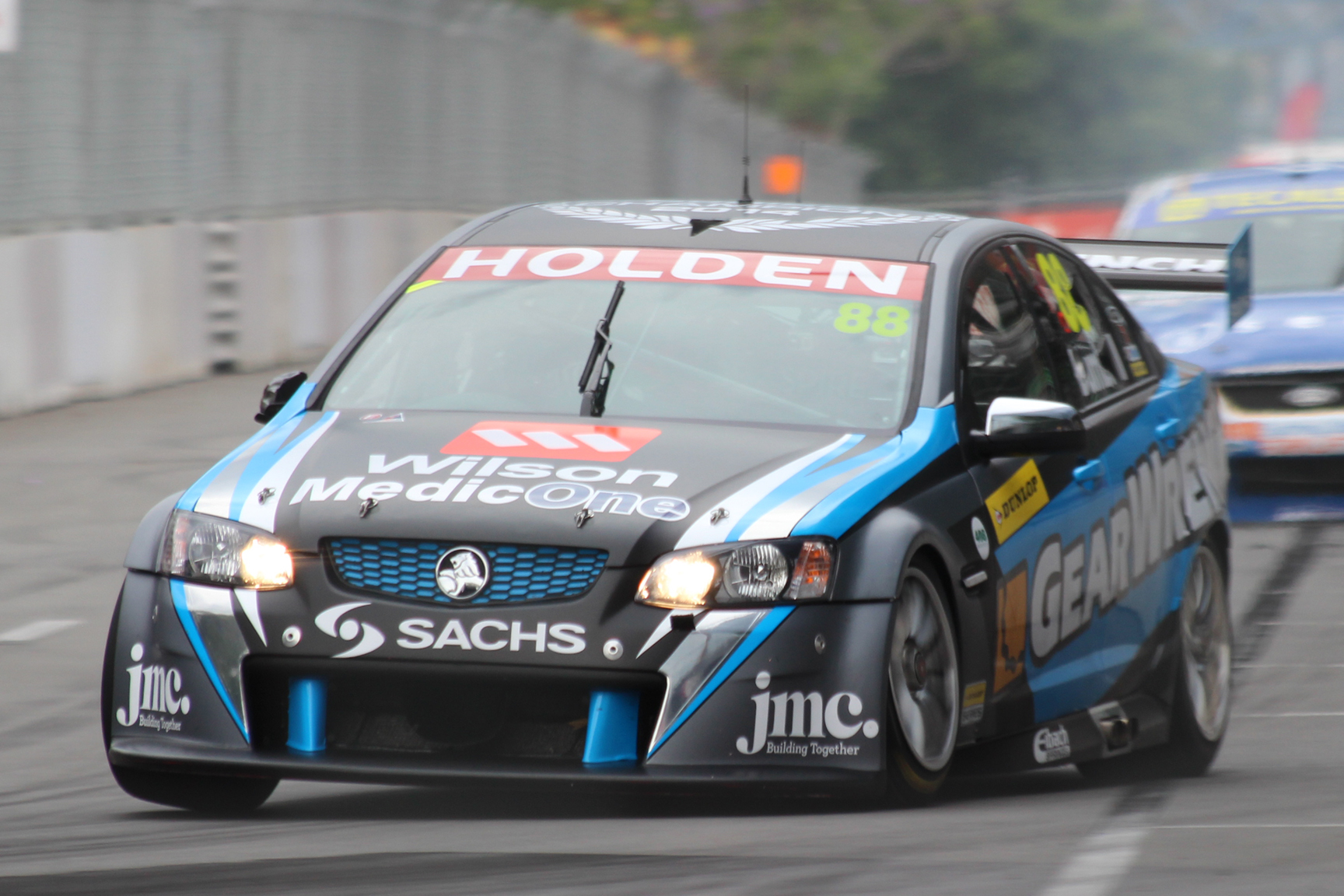
Paul Dumbrell won the 2014 Dunlop V8 Supercar Series.

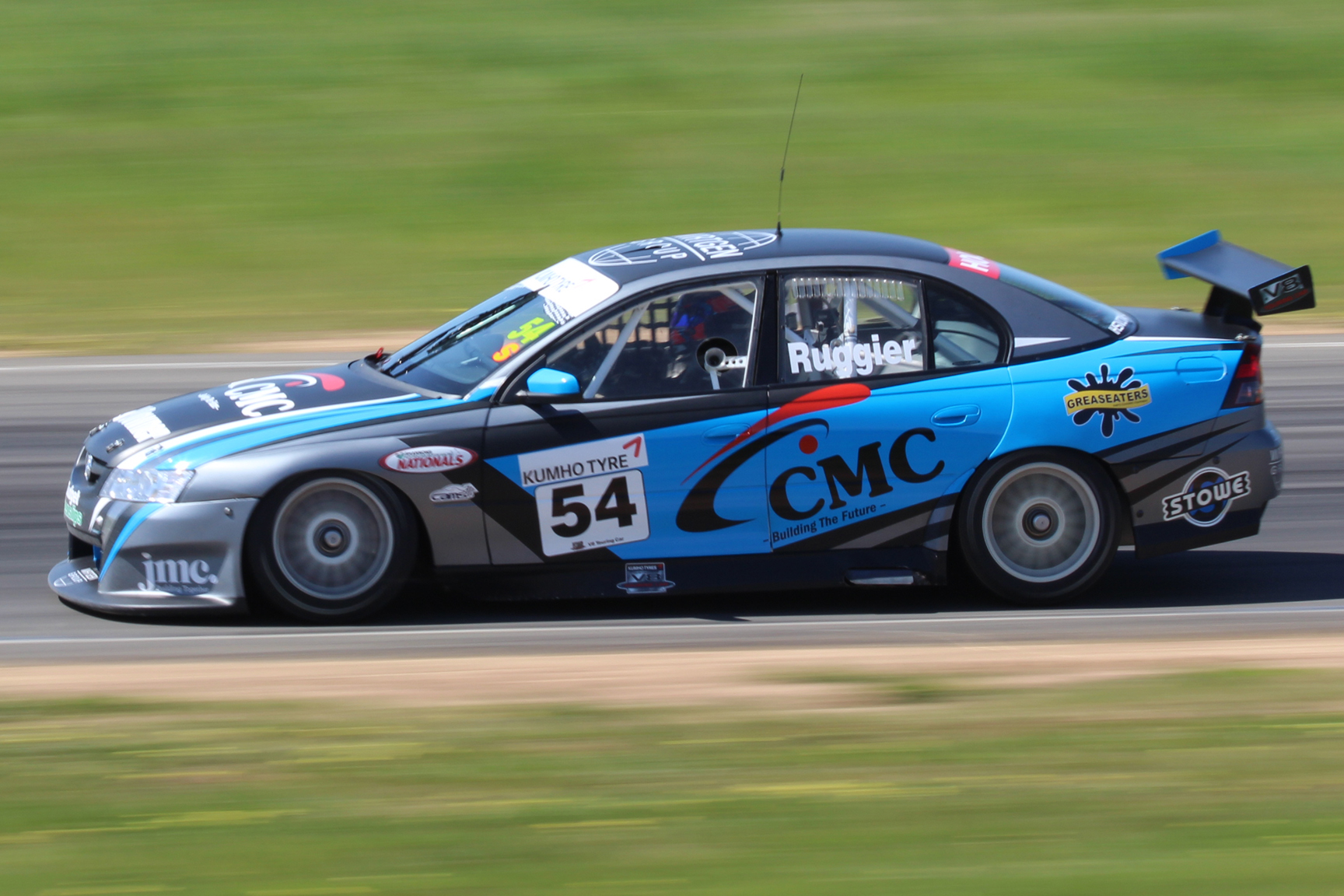
Justin Ruggier won the 2014 Kumho V8 Touring Car Series.

Dates sourced from:

Event title	Circuit	City / state	Race/round	Date	Winner	Report
(South Australia) Clipsal 500 Adelaide	Adelaide Street Circuit	Adelaide, South Australia	IVC 1 IVC 2 IVC 3	27 February–2 March	Jamie Whincup; Craig Lowndes; James Courtney	report
(South Australia) Clipsal 500 Adelaide	Adelaide Street Circuit	Adelaide, South Australia	DVS 1	27 February–2 March	Paul Dumbrell	
(Victoria (state)) MSS Security V8 Supercars Challenge	Albert Park Street Circuit	Melbourne, Victoria	IVC NC	13–16 March	Scott McLaughlin	report
Tyrepower Tasmania 400	Symmons Plains Raceway	Launceston, Tasmania	IVC 4 IVC 5 IVC 6	28–30 March	Jamie Whincup; Jamie Whincup; Craig Lowndes	report
(Victoria (state)) Winton 400	Winton Motor Raceway	Benalla, Victoria	IVC 7 IVC 8 IVC 9	4–6 April	Fabian Coulthard; Lee Holdsworth; Mark Winterbottom	report
(Victoria (state)) Winton 400	Winton Motor Raceway	Benalla, Victoria	DVS 2	4–6 April	Ashley Walsh	
(New Zealand) ITM 500 Auckland	Pukekohe Park Raceway	Pukekohe, New Zealand	IVC 10; IVC 11; IVC 12; IVC 13	24–27 April	Jason Bright; Mark Winterbottom; Shane van Gisbergen; Mark Winterbottom	report
(South Australia) Mallala	Mallala Motorsport Park	Mallala, South Australia	KVTC 1	25–27 April	Ryan Simpson	
(Western Australia) Perth 400	Barbagallo Raceway	Perth, Western Australia	IVC 14; IVC 15; IVC 16	16–18 May	Scott McLaughlin; Craig Lowndes; Chaz Mostert	report
(Western Australia) Perth 400	Barbagallo Raceway	Perth, Western Australia	DVS 3	16–18 May	Ashley Walsh	
(Victoria (state)) Winton	Winton Motor Raceway	Benalla, Victoria	KVTC 2	13–15 June	Ryan Simpson	
(Northern Territory) Skycity Triple Crown	Hidden Valley Raceway	Darwin, Northern Territory	IVC 17; IVC 18; IVC 19	20–22 June	Jamie Whincup; Jamie Whincup; Mark Winterbottom	report
(Queensland) Castrol Townsville 500	Townsville Street Circuit	Townsville, Queensland	IVC 20; IVC 21; IVC 22	4–6 July	Jamie Whincup; Garth Tander; Jamie Whincup	report
(Queensland) Castrol Townsville 500	Townsville Street Circuit	Townsville, Queensland	DVS 4	4–6 July	Chris Pither	
(Queensland) Coates Hire Ipswich 400	Queensland Raceway	Ipswich, Queensland	IVC 23; IVC 24; IVC 25	1–3 August	Jamie Whincup; Jamie Whincup; James Courtney	report
(Queensland) Coates Hire Ipswich 400	Queensland Raceway	Ipswich, Queensland	DVS 5	1–3 August	Paul Dumbrell	
Queensland Raceway	Queensland Raceway	Ipswich, Queensland	KVTC 3	8–10 August	Ryan Simpson	
(New South Wales) Sydney Motorsport Park 400	Sydney Motorsport Park	Sydney, New South Wales	IVC 26; IVC 27; IVC 28	22–24 August	Shane van Gisbergen; Shane van Gisbergen; Scott McLaughlin	report
(Victoria (state)) Wilson Security Sandown 500	Sandown Raceway	Melbourne, Victoria	IVC 29	12–14 September	Jamie Whincup; Paul Dumbrell	report
(Victoria (state)) Phillip Island	Phillip Island Grand Prix Circuit	Phillip Island, Victoria	KVTC 4	19–21 September	Cameron McConville	
(New South Wales) Supercheap Auto Bathurst 1000	Mount Panorama Circuit	Bathurst, New South Wales	IVC 30	9–12 October	Chaz Mostert; Paul Morris	report
(New South Wales) Supercheap Auto Bathurst 1000	Mount Panorama Circuit	Bathurst, New South Wales	DVS 6	9–12 October	Paul Dumbrell	
(New South Wales) Wakefield Park	Wakefield Park	Goulburn, New South Wales	KVTC 5	17–19 October	Justin Ruggier	
(Queensland) Castrol Edge Gold Coast 600	Surfers Paradise Street Circuit	Surfers Paradise, Queensland	IVC 31 IVC 32	24–26 October	Shane van Gisbergen; Jonathon Webb; Jamie Whincup; Paul Dumbrell	report
(New South Wales) Sydney Motorsport Park	Sydney Motorsport Park	Sydney, New South Wales	KVTC 6	31 October–2 November	Justin Ruggier	
(Victoria (state)) Plus Fitness Phillip Island 400	Phillip Island Grand Prix Circuit	Phillip Island, Victoria	IVC 33; IVC 34; IVC 35	14–16 November	Scott McLaughlin; Jamie Whincup; Scott McLaughlin	report
(New South Wales) Sydney NRMA 500	Homebush Street Circuit	Sydney, New South Wales	IVC 36; IVC 37; IVC 38	5–7 December	Jamie Whincup; Jamie Whincup; Shane van Gisbergen	report
(New South Wales) Sydney NRMA 500	Homebush Street Circuit	Sydney, New South Wales	DVS 7	5–7 December	Cameron Waters	

- IVC – International V8 Supercar Championship
- DVS – Dunlop V8 Supercar Series
- KVTC – Kumho Tyres V8 Touring Car Series
- NC – Non-championship
