= Wilson Security Racing =

Wilson Security Racing has been the sponsored identity of a number of Australian Supercars Championship teams.

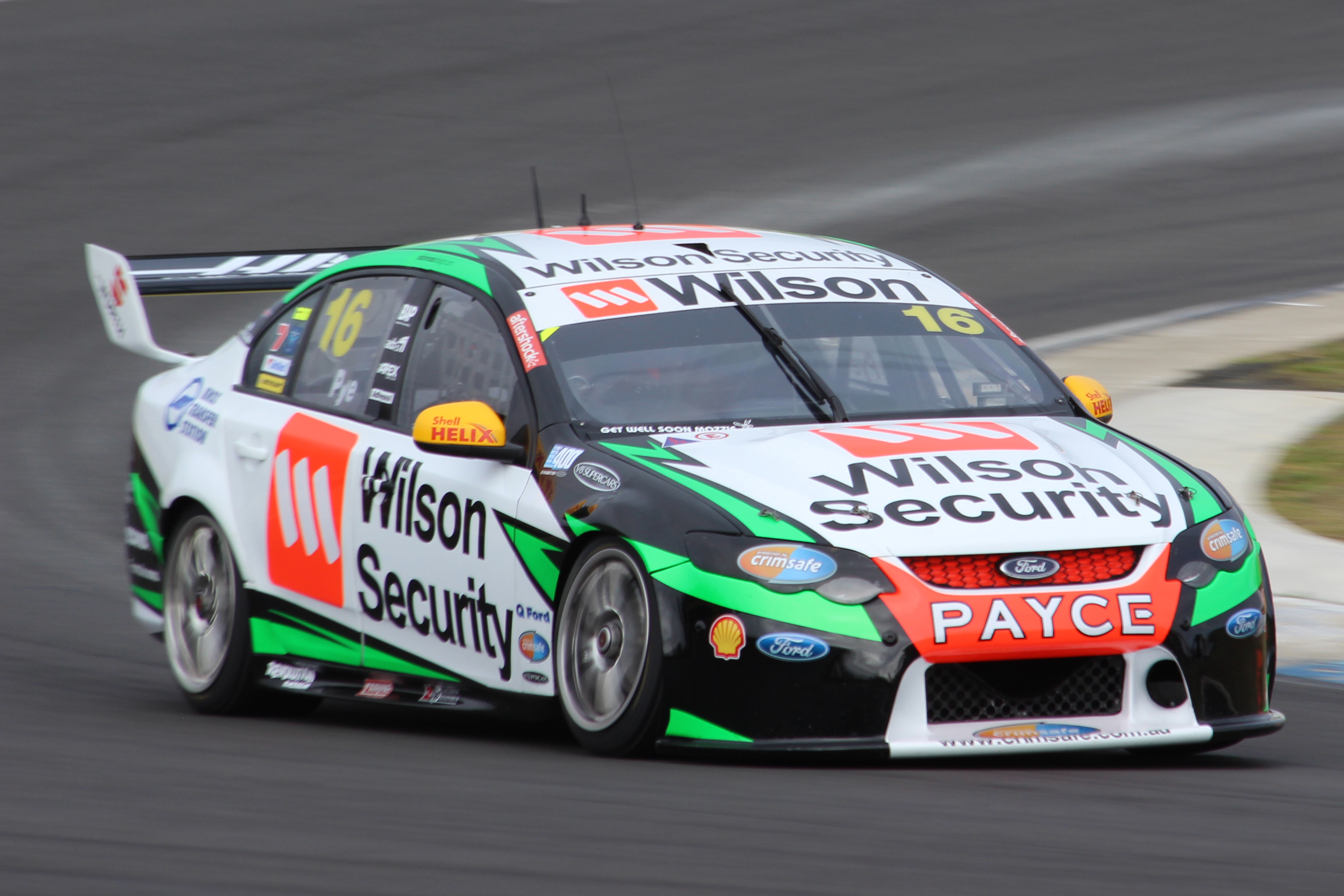
Scott Pye driving for Dick Johnson Racing at the 2014 Sydney Motorsport Park 400.

Year	Series	Team	Car	Drivers
2009	Supercars Championship	Paul Cruickshank Racing	Ford FG Falcon; Ford BF Falcon	111. Fabian Coulthard; 333. Michael Patrizi
2010	Supercars Championship	James Rosenberg Racing	Ford FG Falcon	47. Tim Slade
2011	Supercars Championship	Tony D'Alberto Racing	Ford FG Falcon	3. Tony D'Alberto
2012	Supercars Championship	Britek Motorsport	Holden VE Commodore	21. David Wall
2013	Supercars Championship	Britek Motorsport	Holden VF Commodore	21. David Wall
2013	Supercars Championship	Dick Johnson Racing	Ford FG Falcon	12. Jonny Reid; 12. Chaz Mostert; 17. Tim Blanchard
2014	Supercars Championship	Dick Johnson Racing	Ford FG Falcon	16. Scott Pye; 17. David Wall
2015	Supercars Championship	Garry Rogers Motorsport	Volvo S60	33. Scott McLaughlin; 34. David Wall
2016	Supercars Championship	Garry Rogers Motorsport	Volvo S60	33. Scott McLaughlin; 34. James Moffat
2017	Supercars Championship	Garry Rogers Motorsport	Holden VF Commodore	33. James Moffat; 34. Garth Tander
2018	Supercars Championship	Garry Rogers Motorsport	Holden ZB Commodore	33. Garth Tander; 34. James Golding
