= 2014 International V8 Supercars Championship =

Motor racing competition

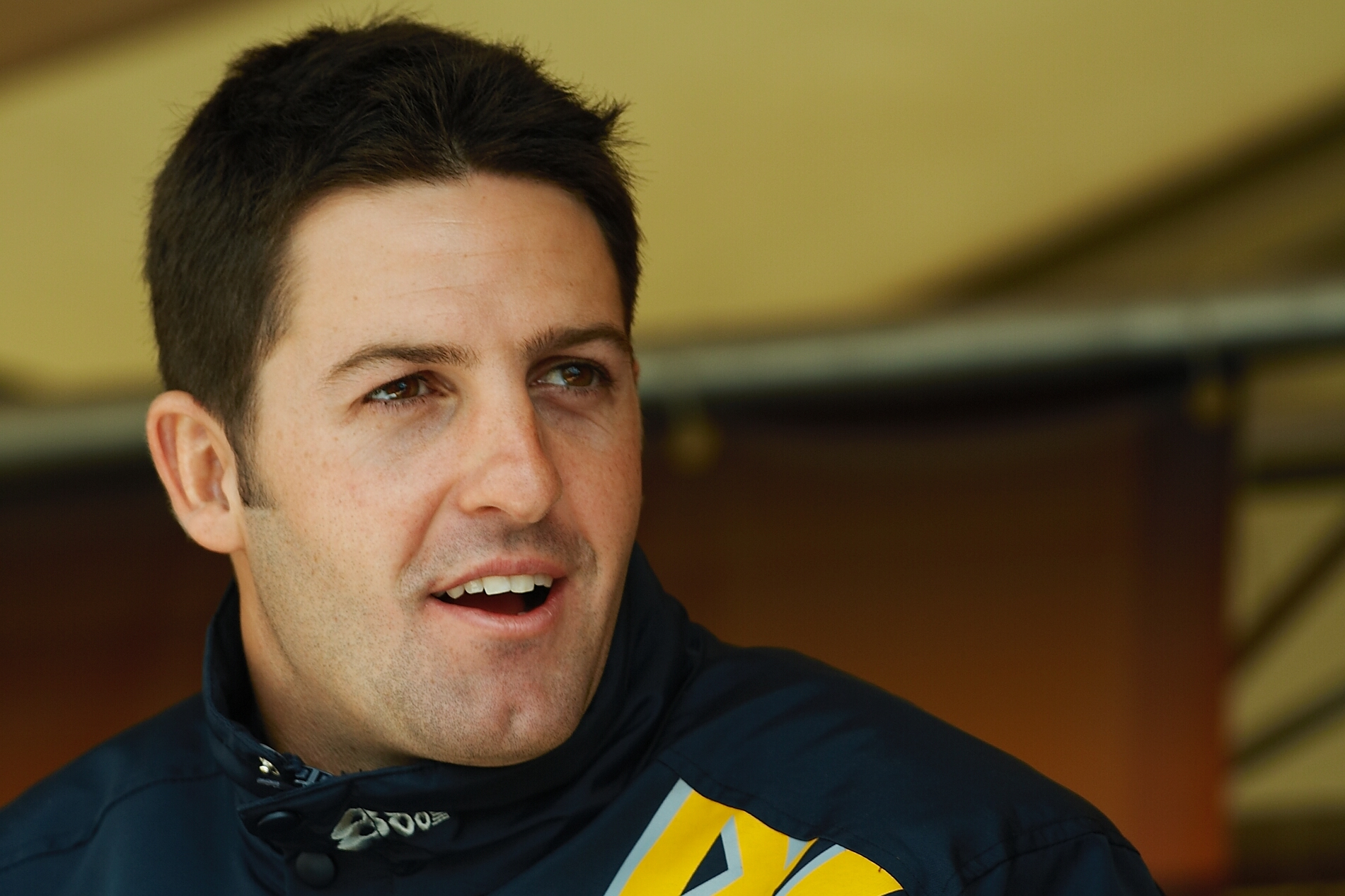
Jamie Whincup won his sixth drivers' championship, a series record.

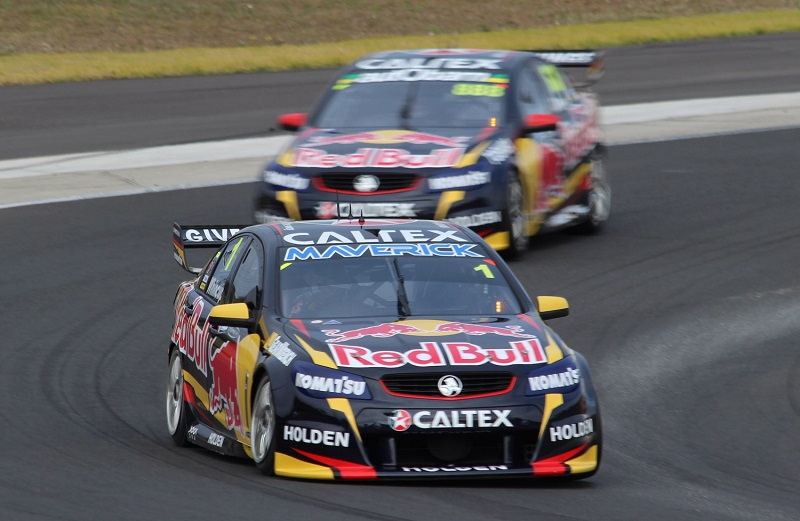
Triple Eight Race Engineering won the teams' championship for the fifth consecutive season.

The 2014 International V8 Supercars Championship (often simplified to the 2014 V8 Supercars Championship) was an FIA-sanctioned international motor racing series for V8 Supercars. It was the sixteenth running of the V8 Supercars Championship and the eighteenth series in which V8 Supercars have contested the premier Australian touring car title.

Volvo entered the championship with a factory team in a collaboration with Garry Rogers Motorsport and its motorsport arm, Polestar Racing. The team raced the Volvo S60 under the Volvo Polestar Racing brand. It was the first time that Volvo has competed in the Australian Touring Car Championship since Robbie Francevic won the title driving a Volvo 240T in 1986. (Note: Volvo previously contested the Australian Super Touring Championship from 1995 to 1999, but this was a separate series to the Australian Touring Car Championship.)

Jamie Whincup successfully defended his drivers' championship, securing a record sixth title at Phillip Island, surpassing the previous record of five held by Ian Geoghegan, Dick Johnson and Mark Skaife. His team, Triple Eight Race Engineering, also retained the teams' championship. Whincup and co-driver Paul Dumbrell won the Endurance Cup, taking wins at the Sandown 500 and the Gold Coast 600.

== Teams and drivers ==
The following teams and drivers competed in the 2014 championship.

Twenty-five cars contested the full 2014 championship, down from twenty-eight in 2013.

Championship entries						Endurance entries	
Manufacturer	Model	Team	No.	Driver name	Rounds	Co-driver name	Rounds
Ford	Falcon FG	Ford Performance Racing	5	(Australia) Mark Winterbottom	All	(Australia) Steve Owen	10–12
Ford	Falcon FG	Ford Performance Racing	6	(Australia) Chaz Mostert	All	(Australia) Paul Morris	10–12
Ford	Falcon FG	Dick Johnson Racing	16	(Australia) Scott Pye	All	(Australia) Ashley Walsh	10–12
Ford	Falcon FG	Dick Johnson Racing	17	(Australia) David Wall	All	(Australia) Steven Johnson	10–12
Ford	Falcon FG	Charlie Schwerkolt Racing (FPR)	18	(Australia) Jack Perkins	All	(Australia) Cam Waters	10–12
Ford	Falcon FG	Rod Nash Racing (FPR)	55	(Australia) David Reynolds	All	(Australia) Dean Canto	10–12
Holden	Commodore VF	Triple Eight Race Engineering	1	(Australia) Jamie Whincup	All	(Australia) Paul Dumbrell	10–12
Holden	Commodore VF	Triple Eight Race Engineering	888	(Australia) Craig Lowndes	All	(New Zealand) Steven Richards	10–12
Holden	Commodore VF	Holden Racing Team	2	(Australia) Garth Tander	All	(Australia) Warren Luff	10-12
Holden	Commodore VF	Holden Racing Team	22	(Australia) James Courtney	All	(New Zealand) Greg Murphy	10–12
Holden	Commodore VF	Brad Jones Racing	8	(Australia) Jason Bright	All	(Australia) Andrew Jones	10–12
Holden	Commodore VF	Brad Jones Racing	14	(New Zealand) Fabian Coulthard	All	(Australia) Luke Youlden	10–12
Holden	Commodore VF	Britek Motorsport (BJR)	21	(Australia) Dale Wood	All	(New Zealand) Chris Pither	10–12
Holden	Commodore VF	Lucas Dumbrell Motorsport	23	(Australia) Russell Ingall	All	(Australia) Tim Blanchard	10–12
Holden	Commodore VF	Walkinshaw Racing (HRT)	47	(Australia) Tim Slade	All	(Australia) Tony D'Alberto	10–12
Holden	Commodore VF	Tekno Autosports	97	(New Zealand) Shane van Gisbergen	All	(Australia) Jonathon Webb	10–12
Holden	Commodore VF	James Rosenberg Racing (HRT)	222	(Australia) Nick Percat	All	(United Kingdom) Oliver Gavin	10–12
Mercedes-Benz	E63 AMG	Erebus Motorsport	4	(Australia) Lee Holdsworth	All	(New Zealand) Craig Baird	10–12
Mercedes-Benz	E63 AMG	Erebus Motorsport	9	(Australia) Will Davison	All	(Australia) Alex Davison	10–12
Nissan	Altima L33	Nissan Motorsport	7	(Australia) Todd Kelly	All	(United Kingdom) Alex Buncombe	10–12
Nissan	Altima L33	Nissan Motorsport	15	(Australia) Rick Kelly	All	(Australia) David Russell	10–12
Nissan	Altima L33	Nissan Motorsport	36	(Australia) Michael Caruso	All	(Australia) Dean Fiore	10–12
Nissan	Altima L33	Nissan Motorsport	360	(Australia) James Moffat	All	(Australia) Taz Douglas	10–12
Volvo	S60	Garry Rogers Motorsport	33	(New Zealand) Scott McLaughlin	All	(France) Alexandre Prémat	10–12
Volvo	S60	Garry Rogers Motorsport	34	(Sweden) Robert Dahlgren	All	(Australia) Greg Ritter	10–12
Wildcard Entries
Ford	Falcon FG	Dick Johnson Racing	66	(Australia) Marcos Ambrose	14	—N/a	
Ford	Falcon FG	Super Black Racing	111	—N/a		(New Zealand) Andre Heimgartner (New Zealand) Ant Pedersen	11

=== Team changes ===
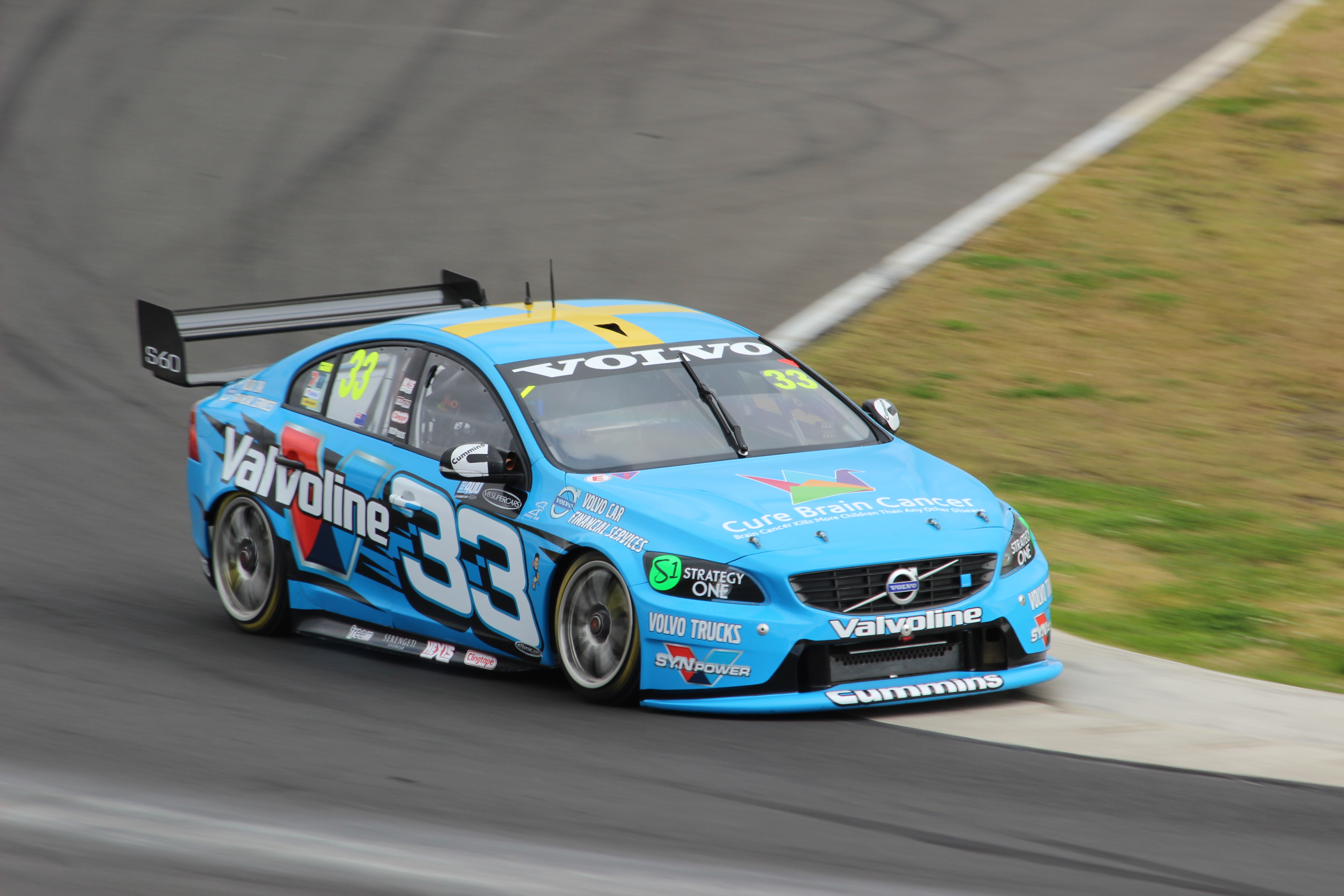
The new-for-2014 Volvo S60 driven by Scott McLaughlin at the SMP 400.

Dick Johnson Racing returned the Racing Entitlement Contract (REC) it had leased from Triple F Racing for the previous two seasons. After unsuccessfully trying to secure sponsorship for a 2014 campaign, Triple F Racing returned the REC to V8 Supercars management.

Garry Rogers Motorsport changed manufacturers, switching from racing Holden Commodores to become a factory-supported Volvo team, racing the second generation S60. The cars were powered by a modified version of Volvo's Yamaha-designed 4.4-litre B8444S V8 engine.

James Rosenberg Racing ended its association with Erebus Motorsport and became a customer of Walkinshaw Racing. After exploring the possibility of securing additional RECs to expand to a four-car team, Erebus downsized to two cars.

Lucas Dumbrell Motorsport scaled back to a single car operation, returning one of its RECs to V8 Supercars management.

Tekno Autosports returned to operating as a single-car team. Shane van Gisbergen's car was entered under the REC the team owns, with the one leased from Paul Morris Motorsport for 2012 and 2013 being returned and sold to Dick Johnson Racing.

Tony D'Alberto Racing was unable to find sufficient sponsorship to compete in the series, so sold its car and equipment to Walkinshaw Racing, and returned its REC to V8 Supercars management.

=== Driver changes ===
Will Davison left Ford Performance Racing to join Erebus Motorsport, replacing Maro Engel.

Chaz Mostert replaced Davison at Ford Performance Racing. He had been contracted to the team in 2013 before he was loaned out to drive for Dick Johnson Racing mid-season.

Scott Pye and David Wall joined Dick Johnson Racing from Lucas Dumbrell Motorsport and Britek Motorsport respectively, replacing Tim Blanchard and Mostert. Blanchard was unable to find a full-time drive, and joined Lucas Dumbrell Motorsport for the endurance events.

Dale Wood, the reigning Dunlop Series champion, replaced Wall at Britek Motorsport. Wood had previously contested the first half of the 2009 season with Kelly Racing.

Russell Ingall was not offered a contract extension by Walkinshaw Racing, and moved to Lucas Dumbrell Motorsport. Tim Slade left Erebus Motorsport to replace Ingall.

Nick Percat made his full-time season debut, driving a car entered by James Rosenberg Racing and run by Walkinshaw Racing.

Jack Perkins returned to the championship on a full-time basis for the first time since 2009, replacing Alex Davison at Charlie Schwerkolt Racing. With the team electing to take Perkins, Davison was left without a seat. Davison would join his brother Will at Erebus Motorsport for the endurance events.

Robert Dahlgren joined Garry Rogers Motorsport, replacing Alexandre Prémat. Dahlgren had previously raced a Volvo S60 in the Scandinavian Touring Car Championship with Garry Rogers Motorsport's partner Polestar Racing. Prémat rejoined the team for the endurance races.

Tony D'Alberto was unable to raise sufficient sponsorship to compete full-time in 2014.

Dean Fiore, who drove for Lucas Dumbrell Motorsport in 2013, was unable to secure funding to continue racing full-time in 2014.

Jonathon Webb elected not to contest the 2014 season full-time, focusing instead on his business interests. His family's Tekno Autosports team therefore did not to take up an option to purchase its leased REC from Paul Morris Motorsport. Webb co-drove for the team during the endurance races.

=== Wildcard entries ===
Super Black Racing, based in New Zealand, entered a wildcard for Andre Heimgartner and Ant Pedersen in the Bathurst 1000.

Marcos Ambrose was entered in a third Dick Johnson Racing Falcon for the Sydney 500 ahead of his return to the series in 2015.

== Calendar ==
The 2014 calendar was released on 23 September 2013.

Rnd.	Event name	Circuit	Location	Format	Date
1	(South Australia) Adelaide 500	Adelaide Street Circuit	Adelaide, South Australia	ST	1–2 March
2	Tasmania 400	Symmons Plains Raceway	Launceston, Tasmania	SP	29–30 March
3	(Victoria (state)) Winton 400	Winton Motor Raceway	Benalla, Victoria	SP	5–6 April
4	(New Zealand) Auckland 500	Pukekohe Park Raceway	Pukekohe, New Zealand	SP	25–27 April
5	(Western Australia) Perth 400	Barbagallo Raceway	Perth, Western Australia	SP	17–18 May
6	(Northern Territory) Darwin Triple Crown	Hidden Valley Raceway	Darwin, Northern Territory	SP	21–22 June
7	(Queensland) Townsville 500	Reid Park Street Circuit	Townsville, Queensland	ST	5–6 July
8	(Queensland) Ipswich 400	Queensland Raceway	Ipswich, Queensland	SP	2–3 August
9	(New South Wales) Sydney Motorsport Park 400	Sydney Motorsport Park	Eastern Creek, New South Wales	SP	23–24 August
10	(Victoria (state)) Sandown 500	Sandown Raceway	Melbourne, Victoria	EC	14 September
11	(New South Wales) Bathurst 1000	Mount Panorama Circuit	Bathurst, New South Wales	EC	12 October
12	(Queensland) Gold Coast 600	Surfers Paradise Street Circuit	Surfers Paradise, Queensland	EC	25–26 October
13	(Victoria (state)) Phillip Island 400	Phillip Island Grand Prix Circuit	Phillip Island, Victoria	SP	15–16 November
14	(New South Wales) Sydney 500	Homebush Street Circuit	Sydney, New South Wales	ST	6–7 December

Icon	Meaning
ST	Super Street
SP	Super Sprint
EC	Endurance Cup

Australian rounds
New Zealand rounds

=== Calendar changes ===
The series did not return to the Circuit of the Americas in the United States. The championship returned to Sydney Motorsport Park for the Sydney Motorsport Park 400, having last raced at the circuit in 2012. The event used the Gardner Circuit configuration. The addition of the Sydney Motorsport Park event in August saw the Winton 400 move from August to April.

=== Format changes ===
There were two formats used for events outside of the Endurance Cup. "Super Street" events were held at the Clipsal 500, Townsville and Sydney 500 events, with a pair of 125-kilometre races held on Saturday and a 250-kilometre race held on Sunday. All other events featured the "Super Sprint" format, with two 100-kilometre races held on Saturday and a single 200-kilometre race held on Sunday, though the Pukekohe event included an additional 100-kilometre race held on Friday. The Sandown 500, Bathurst 1000 and the Gold Coast 600 – races counting towards the Endurance Cup – retained their respective event formats of a single 500-kilometre, 1000-kilometre and two 300-kilometre races. The 60/60 Sprint format, introduced in 2013, was discontinued.

A number of races. including the first race of the Clipsal 500, were held at twilight, coinciding with prime time television broadcasts. The last event held under lights was the opening round of the 1997 season, held at Calder Park Raceway.

== Rule changes ==
2014 saw practice sessions become time-certain, whereby the session finished after a designated amount of time with no allowance for session interruptions, such as red flags. Qualifying sessions run on the same day as each other were allowed a fifteen-minute extension shared between the sessions if required. Additional practice sessions were held at the Winton, Queensland Raceway and Sydney Motorsport Park events.

The 2014 season saw changes to the regulations regarding abandoned starts which require an additional formation lap and for the suspension and resumption of races in the case of a red flag. The procedure used for safety car restarts was also revised. Previously, the lead car controlled the pace until the safety car entered the pit lane at which point the lead car could accelerate. The new rules dictated that the lead car must maintain a speed between fifty and sixty kilometres-per-hour until it reached the "Acceleration Zone" located before the control line – mimicking the restart procedure used for the second half of the 60/60 Sprint format used in 2013 – at which point the driver could accelerate and racing resumed. This was in response to several incidents where the lead car accelerated too early on the safety car restart, most notably at the 2013 Austin 400 where Fabian Coulthard, Jamie Whincup and Craig Lowndes were penalised for the infringement.

Following the Clipsal 500, where Jason Bright's car had rolled following a safety car restart, the restart procedure was reviewed and changed for the second event of the championship. The Acceleration Zone was lengthened and the lead-up speed was raised to be between sixty and eighty kilometres-per-hour. Drivers were no longer allowed to overtake prior to the control line. The safety car restart procedure was eventually changed back to the 2013 system, with Todd Kelly stating that the 2014 procedure had been difficult to manage for the drivers.

Cars were required to take on a specified amount of fuel in the Sunday race at all events bar the Endurance Cup events.

== Results and standings ==
=== Season summary ===
Round	Race	Event	Pole position	Fastest lap	Winning driver	Winning team	Report
1	1	Adelaide 500	(Australia) Jamie Whincup	(Australia) Jason Bright	(Australia) Jamie Whincup	Triple Eight Race Engineering	Report
1	2	Adelaide 500	(Australia) Craig Lowndes	(Australia) Jamie Whincup	(Australia) Craig Lowndes	Triple Eight Race Engineering	Report
1	3	Adelaide 500	(New Zealand) Shane van Gisbergen	(Australia) Lee Holdsworth	(Australia) James Courtney	Holden Racing Team	Report
2	4	Tasmania 400	(Australia) Jamie Whincup	(Australia) Jamie Whincup	(Australia) Jamie Whincup	Triple Eight Race Engineering	Report
2	5	Tasmania 400	(Australia) Jamie Whincup	(Australia) Craig Lowndes	(Australia) Jamie Whincup	Triple Eight Race Engineering	Report
2	6	Tasmania 400	(Australia) Jamie Whincup	(Australia) Craig Lowndes	(Australia) Craig Lowndes	Triple Eight Race Engineering	Report
3	7	Winton 400	(New Zealand) Fabian Coulthard	(Australia) Jason Bright	(New Zealand) Fabian Coulthard	Brad Jones Racing	Report
3	8	Winton 400	(New Zealand) Fabian Coulthard	(Australia) Lee Holdsworth	(Australia) Lee Holdsworth	Erebus Motorsport	Report
3	9	Winton 400	(New Zealand) Scott McLaughlin	(New Zealand) Scott McLaughlin	(Australia) Mark Winterbottom	Ford Performance Racing	Report
4	10	Auckland 500	(Australia) Jason Bright	(Australia) Jason Bright	(Australia) Jason Bright	Brad Jones Racing	Report
4	11	Auckland 500	(Australia) James Courtney	(Australia) Mark Winterbottom	(Australia) Mark Winterbottom	Ford Performance Racing	Report
4	12	Auckland 500	(New Zealand) Scott McLaughlin	(New Zealand) Shane van Gisbergen	(New Zealand) Shane van Gisbergen	Tekno Autosports	Report
4	13	Auckland 500	(New Zealand) Scott McLaughlin	(New Zealand) Scott McLaughlin	(Australia) Mark Winterbottom	Ford Performance Racing	Report
5	14	Perth 400	(New Zealand) Scott McLaughlin	(Australia) Chaz Mostert	(New Zealand) Scott McLaughlin	Garry Rogers Motorsport	Report
5	15	Perth 400	(Australia) Craig Lowndes	(Australia) Chaz Mostert	(Australia) Craig Lowndes	Triple Eight Race Engineering	Report
5	16	Perth 400	(Australia) Craig Lowndes	(Australia) Craig Lowndes	(Australia) Chaz Mostert	Ford Performance Racing	Report
6	17	Darwin Triple Crown	(Australia) Jamie Whincup	(Australia) Jamie Whincup	(Australia) Jamie Whincup	Triple Eight Race Engineering	Report
6	18	Darwin Triple Crown	(Australia) Jamie Whincup	(Australia) Jamie Whincup	(Australia) Jamie Whincup	Triple Eight Race Engineering	Report
6	19	Darwin Triple Crown	(Australia) Craig Lowndes	(New Zealand) Scott McLaughlin	(Australia) Mark Winterbottom	Ford Performance Racing	Report
7	20	Townsville 500	(Australia) James Courtney	(Australia) Garth Tander	(Australia) Jamie Whincup	Triple Eight Race Engineering	Report
7	21	Townsville 500	(New Zealand) Fabian Coulthard	(Australia) Garth Tander	(Australia) Garth Tander	Holden Racing Team	Report
7	22	Townsville 500	(Australia) Jason Bright	(Australia) Jamie Whincup	(Australia) Jamie Whincup	Triple Eight Race Engineering	Report
8	23	Ipswich 400	(Australia) Craig Lowndes	(Australia) Michael Caruso	(Australia) Jamie Whincup	Triple Eight Race Engineering	Report
8	24	Ipswich 400	(New Zealand) Scott McLaughlin	(Australia) Michael Caruso	(Australia) Jamie Whincup	Triple Eight Race Engineering	Report
8	25	Ipswich 400	(Australia) James Moffat	(Australia) Lee Holdsworth	(Australia) James Courtney	Holden Racing Team	Report
9	26	Sydney Motorsport Park 400	(Australia) Jamie Whincup	(New Zealand) Shane van Gisbergen	(New Zealand) Shane van Gisbergen	Tekno Autosports	Report
9	27	Sydney Motorsport Park 400	(New Zealand) Scott McLaughlin	(Australia) Chaz Mostert	(New Zealand) Shane van Gisbergen	Tekno Autosports	Report
9	28	Sydney Motorsport Park 400	(New Zealand) Scott McLaughlin	(New Zealand) Fabian Coulthard	(New Zealand) Scott McLaughlin	Garry Rogers Motorsport	Report
10	29	Sandown 500	(Australia) Jamie Whincup (Australia) Paul Dumbrell	(Australia) Jamie Whincup	(Australia) Jamie Whincup (Australia) Paul Dumbrell	Triple Eight Race Engineering	Report
11	30	Bathurst 1000	(New Zealand) Shane van Gisbergen	(Australia) Chaz Mostert	(Australia) Chaz Mostert (Australia) Paul Morris	Ford Performance Racing	Report
12	31	Gold Coast 600	(New Zealand) Shane van Gisbergen	(Australia) Jamie Whincup	(New Zealand) Shane van Gisbergen (Australia) Jonathon Webb	Tekno Autosports	Report
12	32	Gold Coast 600	(New Zealand) Scott McLaughlin	(Australia) Jamie Whincup	(Australia) Jamie Whincup (Australia) Paul Dumbrell	Triple Eight Race Engineering	Report
13	33	Phillip Island 400	(New Zealand) Scott McLaughlin	(New Zealand) Scott McLaughlin	(New Zealand) Scott McLaughlin	Garry Rogers Motorsport	Report
13	34	Phillip Island 400	(Australia) Jamie Whincup	(Australia) Jamie Whincup	(Australia) Jamie Whincup	Triple Eight Race Engineering	Report
13	35	Phillip Island 400	(Australia) Jamie Whincup	(New Zealand) Scott McLaughlin	(New Zealand) Scott McLaughlin	Garry Rogers Motorsport	Report
14	36	Sydney 500	(Australia) Will Davison	(Australia) Jamie Whincup	(Australia) Jamie Whincup	Triple Eight Race Engineering	Report
14	37	Sydney 500	(Australia) Jason Bright	(Australia) Jamie Whincup	(Australia) Jamie Whincup	Triple Eight Race Engineering	Report
14	38	Sydney 500	(New Zealand) Scott McLaughlin	(New Zealand) Shane van Gisbergen	(New Zealand) Shane van Gisbergen	Tekno Autosports	Report

=== Points system ===
Points were awarded for each race at an event, to the driver/s of a car that completed at least 75% of the race distance and was running at the completion of the race, up to a maximum of 300 points per event.

Points format	Position																									
Points format	1st	2nd	3rd	4th	5th	6th	7th	8th	9th	10th	11th	12th	13th	14th	15th	16th	17th	18th	19th	20th	21st	22nd	23rd	24th	25th	26th
Short format	75	69	64	60	55	51	48	45	42	39	36	34	33	31	30	28	27	25	24	22	21	19	18	16	15	13
Long format	150	138	129	120	111	102	96	90	84	78	72	69	66	63	60	57	54	51	48	45	42	39	36	33	30	27
Auckland format	50	46	43	40	37	34	32	30	28	26	24	23	22	21	20	19	18	17	16	15	14	13	12	11	10	—N/a
Endurance format	300	276	258	240	222	204	192	180	168	156	144	138	132	126	120	114	108	102	96	90	84	78	72	66	60	54

- Short format: Used for the 100 km races of Super Sprint events (excluding Auckland) and the 125 km races of Super Street events.
- Long format: Used for the 200 km races of Super Sprint events, the 250 km race of Super Street events and in both races of the Gold Coast 600.
- Auckland format: Used for the 100 km races of the Auckland 500.
- Endurance format: Used for the Sandown 500 and Bathurst 1000 endurance races.

=== Drivers' championship ===
Pos.	Driver	No.	ADE (South Australia)			SYM (Tasmania)			WIN (Victoria (state))			PUK (New Zealand)				BAR (Western Australia)			HID (Northern Territory)			TOW (Queensland)			QLD (Queensland)			SMP (New South Wales)			**SAN** **(Victoria (state))**	**BAT** **(New South Wales)**	**SUR** **(Queensland)**		PHI (Victoria (state))			SYD (New South Wales)			Pen.	Pts.
1	(Australia) Jamie Whincup	1	**1**	3	15	**1**	**1**	**2**	9	19	10	24	4	4	10	17	3	4	**1**	**1**	3	1	7	1	1	1	6	**4**	3	5	**1**	5	2	1	3	**1**	**4**	1	1	4	25	3364
2	(New Zealand) Shane van Gisbergen	97	3	16	**3**	11	11	7	2	20	12	2	5	1	4	25	19	20	3	7	2	5	4	3	10	4	10	1	1	7	6	**16**	**1**	5	24	17	5	6	2	1	25	2781
3	(Australia) Mark Winterbottom	5	4	4	12	3	2	9	7	2	1	13	1	2	1	4	2	3	6	6	1	11	8	6	6	6	22	11	12	20	10	6	4	13	23	3	3	23	5	19	0	2768
4	(Australia) Craig Lowndes	888	2	**1**	2	8	5	1	8	16	7	3	16	10	20	6	**1**	**2**	2	2	**17**	Ret	6	23	**2**	2	2	3	11	9	4	10	17	11	2	2	10	13	20	17	25	2659
5	(New Zealand) Scott McLaughlin	33	7	2	Ret	5	4	6	Ret	25	**16**	8	6	**3**	**2**	**1**	4	17	4	5	8	6	14	9	3	**19**	19	Ret	**Ret**	**1**	8	17	7	**2**	**1**	6	1	4	3	**8**	0	2509
6	(Australia) James Courtney	22	9	18	1	2	10	3	Ret	9	2	4	**2**	12	14	9	8	15	8	11	5	**8**	2	4	5	10	1	8	8	Ret	2	13	Ret	21	13	13	12	11	6	3	25	2489
7	(Australia) Chaz Mostert	6	Ret	6	Ret	13	18	14	12	10	6	21	3	16	3	3	6	1	14	14	15	13	5	7	14	3	3	13	2	10	7	1	6	17	14	9	16	15	15	5	25	2451
8	(New Zealand) Fabian Coulthard	14	5	5	4	9	3	5	**1**	**3**	11	7	10	11	9	2	5	5	9	3	22	15	**3**	14	4	9	11	Ret	7	3	11	9	10	7	15	15	15	8	11	12	25	2443
9	(Australia) Garth Tander	2	11	7	13	6	6	25	15	21	23	9	9	5	12	15	11	22	5	4	6	2	1	2	8	8	9	2	Ret	18	3	DNS	9	12	4	4	2	10	10	2	25	2289
10	(Australia) Michael Caruso	36	18	8	14	21	14	19	19	17	8	17	20	13	5	20	15	10	12	10	13	10	Ret	11	13	24	8	5	20	8	18	15	5	3	5	7	9	22	8	Ret	0	1939
11	(Australia) Jason Bright	8	8	21	Ret	15	17	17	4	7	4	**1**	12	23	6	13	17	6	7	12	20	7	17	**17**	18	11	17	9	4	6	Ret	14	15	18	6	16	7	9	**4**	9	0	1927
12	(Australia) Nick Percat	222	22	15	Ret	17	Ret	15	21	15	17	6	7	7	11	22	20	11	23	19	23	4	9	5	12	7	7	16	19	2	22	3	18	10	10	10	8	12	19	11	25	1921
13	(Australia) Rick Kelly	15	6	11	5	Ret	24	20	20	18	14	20	17	15	8	19	22	14	17	22	9	14	19	18	11	5	15	6	9	14	13	8	19	9	9	8	11	5	14	7	25	1921
14	(Australia) Will Davison	9	13	10	Ret	7	23	4	6	8	18	5	18	18	7	7	18	24	Ret	13	16	3	16	10	7	14	18	7	5	11	21	4	20	20	11	14	6	**Ret**	13	10	25	1912
15	(Australia) David Reynolds	55	Ret	19	7	23	15	10	11	4	5	14	8	6	17	10	9	9	13	9	4	9	11	12	9	15	25	Ret	13	Ret	9	Ret	Ret	6	7	12	22	3	12	13	0	1789
16	(Australia) James Moffat	360	20	12	9	18	12	22	18	6	9	10	15	8	16	21	21	8	11	Ret	7	21	18	16	Ret	13	**5**	12	6	4	Ret	2	13	Ret	18	11	18	14	17	15	85	1734
17	(Australia) Tim Slade	47	15	14	6	14	19	8	Ret	11	3	11	Ret	24	21	23	14	25	16	8	19	Ret	Ret	13	15	17	14	Ret	DNS	DNS	12	Ret	3	4	12	24	17	2	7	6	0	1646
18	(Australia) Russell Ingall	23	12	13	17	4	21	11	10	22	20	15	19	14	19	11	10	13	19	21	10	17	10	21	20	21	13	14	10	17	14	Ret	8	8	20	18	23	19	25	20	50	1510
19	(Australia) Scott Pye	16	10	20	Ret	10	7	16	14	12	19	18	11	9	13	18	7	12	15	15	14	12	12	8	16	12	4	20	21	Ret	5	Ret	DSQ	DSQ	DSQ	DSQ	DSQ	Ret	9	21	0	1407
20	(Australia) Lee Holdsworth	4	17	17	16	16	9	12	5	1	15	12	14	17	15	5	12	18	10	Ret	12	22	15	15	17	18	23	10	15	13	Ret	Ret	11	Ret	19	20	13	17	24	18	25	1395
21	(Australia) David Wall	17	14	Ret	8	12	20	13	13	5	22	Ret	DNS	DNS	DNS	14	13	7	18	16	18	16	13	20	19	20	12	18	14	12	16	Ret	16	15	17	19	Ret	7	Ret	22	0	1349
22	(Australia) Todd Kelly	7	16	9	Ret	Ret	13	21	17	23	13	16	13	19	24	8	16	16	20	23	Ret	18	20	19	24	16	21	Ret	17	15	20	7	Ret	19	8	5	14	Ret	23	14	35	1323
23	(Australia) Jack Perkins	18	19	22	11	22	8	18	16	14	21	19	22	22	18	12	25	23	24	20	21	Ret	21	Ret	21	25	24	15	16	19	15	12	Ret	14	16	23	20	16	22	23	0	1280
24	(Australia) Dale Wood	21	23	24	10	19	22	24	3	13	25	23	21	20	22	16	23	19	21	17	11	20	23	Ret	22	23	20	17	18	16	19	Ret	14	Ret	22	21	19	21	16	24	0	1169
25	(Sweden) Robert Dahlgren	34	21	23	Ret	20	16	23	Ret	24	24	22	Ret	21	23	24	24	21	23	18	Ret	19	22	22	23	22	16	19	Ret	DNS	17	Ret	12	16	21	22	21	18	18	Ret	0	921
26	(Australia) Paul Dumbrell	1																													**1**	5	2	1							0	810
27	(Australia) Paul Morris	6																													7	1	6	17							0	648
28	(Australia) Jonathon Webb	97																													6	16	1	5							0	579
29	(Australia) Steve Owen	5																													10	6	4	13							0	546
30	(France) Alexandre Prémat	33																													8	17	7	2							0	522
31	(New Zealand) Steven Richards	888																													4	10	17	11							0	522
32	(Australia) Luke Youlden	14																													11	9	10	7							0	486
33	(United Kingdom) Oliver Gavin	222																													22	3	18	10							0	465
34	(Australia) Dean Fiore	36																													18	15	5	3							0	462
35	(New Zealand) Greg Murphy	22																													2	13	Ret	21							0	450
36	(Australia) David Russell	15																													13	8	19	9							0	444
37	(Australia) Alex Davison	9																													21	4	20	20							0	414
38	(Australia) Warren Luff	2																													3	DNS	9	12							0	411
39	(Australia) Tony D'Alberto	47																													12	Ret	3	4							0	387
40	(Australia) Taz Douglas	360																													Ret	2	13	Ret							0	342
41	(United Kingdom) Alex Buncombe	7																													20	7	Ret	19							0	330
42	(Australia) Cam Waters	18																													15	12	Ret	14							0	321
43	(Australia) Tim Blanchard	23																													14	Ret	8	8							0	306
44	(Australia) Dean Canto	55																													9	Ret	Ret	6							0	270
45	(Australia) Andrew Jones	8																													Ret	14	15	18							0	237
46	(Australia) Greg Ritter	34																													17	Ret	12	16							0	234
47	(Australia) Steven Johnson	17																													16	Ret	16	15							0	231
48	(Australia) Ashley Walsh	16																													5	Ret	DSQ	DSQ							0	222
49	(New Zealand) Chris Pither	21																													19	Ret	14	Ret							0	159
50	(New Zealand) Andre Heimgartner	111																														11									0	144
50	(New Zealand) Ant Pedersen	111																														11									0	144
52	(New Zealand) Craig Baird	4																													Ret	Ret	11	Ret							0	72
—	(Australia) Marcos Ambrose^{1}	66																																				20	21	16	0	0
Pos.	Driver	No.	ADE (South Australia)			SYM (Tasmania)			WIN (Victoria (state))			PUK (New Zealand)				BAR (Western Australia)			HID (Northern Territory)			TOW (Queensland)			QLD (Queensland)			SMP (New South Wales)			**SAN** **(Victoria (state))**	**BAT** **(New South Wales)**	**SUR** **(Queensland)**		PHI (Victoria (state))			SYD (New South Wales)			Pen.	Pts.

Colour	Result
Gold	Winner
Silver	Second place
Bronze	Third place
Green	Points classification
Blue	Non-points classification
Blue	Non-classified finish (NC)
Purple	Retired, not classified (Ret)
Red	Did not qualify (DNQ)
Red	Did not pre-qualify (DNPQ)
Black	Disqualified (DSQ)
White	Did not start (DNS)
White	Withdrew (WD)
White	Race cancelled (C)
Blank	Did not practice (DNP)
Blank	Did not arrive (DNA)
Blank	Excluded (EX)

Bold - Pole position
Italics - Fastest lap

Results count toward the Endurance Cup.

Notes:
^1 – Wildcard entry ineligible for championship points.

=== Teams' championship ===
Pos.	Team	No.	ADE (South Australia)			SYM (Tasmania)			WIN (Victoria (state))			PUK (New Zealand)				BAR (Western Australia)			HID (Northern Territory)			TOW (Queensland)			QLD (Queensland)			SMP (New South Wales)			**SAN** **(Victoria (state))**	**BAT** **(New South Wales)**	**SUR** **(Queensland)**		PHI (Victoria (state))			SYD (New South Wales)			Pen.	Pts.
1	Triple Eight Race Engineering	1	**1**	3	15	**1**	**1**	**2**	9	19	10	24	4	4	10	17	3	4	**1**	**1**	3	1	7	1	1	1	6	**4**	3	5	**1**	5	2	1	3	**1**	**4**	1	1	4	0	6073
1	Triple Eight Race Engineering	888	2	**1**	2	8	5	1	8	16	7	3	16	10	20	6	**1**	**2**	2	2	**17**	Ret	6	23	**2**	2	2	3	11	9	4	10	17	11	2	2	10	13	20	17	0	6073
2	Ford Performance Racing	5	4	4	12	3	2	9	7	2	1	13	1	2	1	4	2	3	6	6	1	11	8	6	6	6	22	11	12	20	10	6	4	13	23	3	3	23	5	19	0	5244
2	Ford Performance Racing	6	Ret	6	Ret	13	18	14	12	10	6	21	3	16	3	3	6	1	14	14	15	13	5	7	14	3	3	13	2	10	7	1	6	17	14	9	16	15	15	5	0	5244
3	Holden Racing Team	2	11	7	13	6	6	25	15	21	23	9	9	5	12	15	11	22	5	4	6	2	1	2	8	8	9	2	Ret	18	3	DNS	9	12	4	4	2	10	10	2	0	4828
3	Holden Racing Team	22	9	18	1	2	10	3	Ret	9	2	4	**2**	12	14	9	8	15	8	11	5	**8**	2	4	5	10	1	8	8	Ret	2	13	Ret	21	13	13	12	11	6	3	0	4828
4	Brad Jones Racing	8	8	21	Ret	15	17	17	4	7	4	**1**	12	23	6	13	17	6	7	12	20	7	17	**17**	18	11	17	9	4	6	Ret	14	15	18	6	16	7	9	**4**	9	0	4395
4	Brad Jones Racing	14	5	5	4	9	3	5	**1**	**3**	11	7	10	11	9	2	5	5	9	3	22	15	**3**	14	4	9	11	Ret	7	3	11	9	10	7	15	15	15	8	11	12	0	4395
5	Nissan Motorsport	36	18	8	14	21	14	19	19	17	8	17	20	13	5	20	15	10	12	10	13	10	Ret	11	13	24	8	5	20	8	18	15	5	3	5	7	9	22	8	Ret	0	3758
5	Nissan Motorsport	360	20	12	9	18	12	22	18	6	9	10	15	8	16	21	21	8	11	Ret	7	21	18	16	Ret	13	**5**	12	6	4	Ret	2	13	Ret	18	11	18	14	17	15	0	3758
6	Garry Rogers Motorsport	33	7	2	Ret	5	4	6	Ret	25	**16**	8	6	**3**	**2**	**1**	4	17	4	5	8	6	14	9	3	**19**	19	Ret	**Ret**	**1**	8	17	7	**2**	**1**	6	1	4	3	**8**	50	3380
6	Garry Rogers Motorsport	34	21	23	Ret	20	16	23	Ret	24	24	22	Ret	21	23	24	24	21	23	18	Ret	19	22	22	23	22	16	19	Ret	DNS	17	Ret	12	16	21	22	21	18	18	Ret	50	3380
7	Erebus Motorsport	4	17	17	16	16	9	12	5	1	15	12	14	17	15	5	12	18	10	Ret	12	22	15	15	17	18	23	10	15	13	Ret	Ret	11	Ret	19	20	13	17	24	18	0	3357
7	Erebus Motorsport	9	13	10	Ret	7	23	4	6	8	18	5	18	18	7	7	18	24	Ret	13	16	3	16	10	7	14	18	7	5	11	21	4	20	20	11	14	6	**Ret**	13	10	0	3357
8	Nissan Motorsport	7	16	9	Ret	Ret	13	21	17	23	13	16	13	19	24	8	16	16	20	23	Ret	18	20	19	24	16	21	Ret	17	15	20	7	Ret	19	8	5	14	Ret	23	14	0	3304
8	Nissan Motorsport	15	6	11	5	Ret	24	20	20	18	14	20	17	15	8	19	22	14	17	22	9	14	19	18	11	5	15	6	9	14	13	8	19	9	9	8	11	5	14	7	0	3304
9	Tekno Autosports	97	3	16	**3**	11	11	7	2	20	12	2	5	1	4	25	19	20	3	7	2	5	4	3	10	4	10	1	1	7	6	**16**	**1**	5	24	17	5	6	2	1	30	2776
10	Dick Johnson Racing	16	10	20	Ret	10	7	16	14	12	19	18	11	9	13	18	7	12	15	15	14	12	12	8	16	12	4	20	21	Ret	5	Ret	DSQ	DSQ	DSQ	DSQ	DSQ	Ret	9	21	0	2756
10	Dick Johnson Racing	17	14	Ret	8	12	20	13	13	5	22	Ret	DNS	DNS	DNS	14	13	7	18	16	18	16	13	20	19	20	12	18	14	12	16	Ret	16	15	17	19	Ret	7	Ret	22	0	2756
11	James Rosenberg Racing	222	22	15	Ret	17	Ret	15	21	15	17	6	7	7	11	22	20	11	23	19	23	4	9	5	12	7	7	16	19	2	22	3	18	10	10	10	8	12	19	11	0	1946
12	Rod Nash Racing	55	Ret	19	7	23	15	10	11	4	5	14	8	6	17	10	9	9	13	9	4	9	11	12	9	15	25	Ret	13	Ret	9	Ret	Ret	6	7	12	22	3	12	13	0	1789
13	Walkinshaw Racing	47	15	14	6	14	19	8	Ret	11	3	11	Ret	24	21	23	14	25	16	8	19	Ret	Ret	13	15	17	14	Ret	DNS	DNS	12	Ret	3	4	12	24	17	2	7	6	30	1616
14	Lucas Dumbrell Motorsport	23	12	13	17	4	21	11	10	22	20	15	19	14	19	11	10	13	19	21	10	17	10	21	20	21	13	14	10	17	14	Ret	8	8	20	18	23	19	25	20	0	1560
15	Charlie Schwerkolt Racing	18	19	22	11	22	8	18	16	14	21	19	22	22	18	12	25	23	24	20	21	Ret	21	Ret	21	25	24	15	16	19	15	12	Ret	14	16	23	20	16	22	23	0	1280
16	Britek Motorsport	21	23	24	10	19	22	24	3	13	25	23	21	20	22	16	23	19	21	17	11	20	23	Ret	22	23	20	17	18	16	19	Ret	14	Ret	22	21	19	21	16	24	0	1169
17	Super Black Racing (w)	111																															11								0	144
Pos.	Driver	No.	ADE (South Australia)			SYM (Tasmania)			WIN (Victoria (state))			PUK (New Zealand)				BAR (Western Australia)			HID (Northern Territory)			TOW (Queensland)			QLD (Queensland)			SMP (New South Wales)			**SAN** **(Victoria (state))**	**BAT** **(New South Wales)**	**SUR** **(Queensland)**		PHI (Victoria (state))			SYD (New South Wales)			Pen.	Pts.

Colour	Result
Gold	Winner
Silver	Second place
Bronze	Third place
Green	Points classification
Blue	Non-points classification
Blue	Non-classified finish (NC)
Purple	Retired, not classified (Ret)
Red	Did not qualify (DNQ)
Red	Did not pre-qualify (DNPQ)
Black	Disqualified (DSQ)
White	Did not start (DNS)
White	Withdrew (WD)
White	Race cancelled (C)
Blank	Did not practice (DNP)
Blank	Did not arrive (DNA)
Blank	Excluded (EX)

Bold - Pole position
Italics - Fastest lap

Results count toward the Endurance Cup.

- (w) - denotes wildcard entry

=== Enduro Cup ===
Pos.	Drivers	No.	**SAN** **(Victoria (state))**	**BAT** **(New South Wales)**	**SUR** **(Queensland)**		Pen.	Pts.
1	Jamie Whincup / Paul Dumbrell	1	**1**	5	2	1	0	810
2	Chaz Mostert / Paul Morris	6	7	1	6	17	0	648
3	Shane van Gisbergen / Jonathon Webb	97	6	**16**	**1**	5	0	579
4	Mark Winterbottom / Steve Owen	5	10	6	4	13	0	546
5	Scott McLaughlin / Alexandre Prémat	33	8	17	7	**2**	0	522
6	Craig Lowndes / Steven Richards	888	4	10	17	11	0	522
7	Fabian Coulthard / Luke Youlden	14	11	9	10	7	0	486
8	Nick Percat / Oliver Gavin	222	22	3	18	10	0	465
9	Michael Caruso / Dean Fiore	36	18	15	5	3	0	462
10	James Courtney / Greg Murphy	22	2	13	Ret	21	0	450
11	Rick Kelly / David Russell	15	13	8	19	9	0	444
12	Will Davison / Alex Davison	9	21	4	20	20	0	414
13	Garth Tander / Warren Luff	2	3	DNS	9	12	0	411
14	Tim Slade / Tony D'Alberto	47	12	Ret	3	4	0	387
15	James Moffat / Taz Douglas	360	Ret	2	13	Ret	0	342
16	Todd Kelly / Alex Buncombe	7	20	7	Ret	19	0	330
17	Jack Perkins / Cam Waters	18	15	12	Ret	14	0	321
18	Russell Ingall / Tim Blanchard	23	14	Ret	8	8	25	281
19	David Reynolds / Dean Canto	55	9	Ret	Ret	6	0	270
20	Jason Bright / Andrew Jones	8	Ret	14	15	18	0	237
21	Robert Dahlgren / Greg Ritter	34	17	Ret	12	16	0	234
22	David Wall / Steven Johnson	17	16	Ret	16	15	0	231
23	Scott Pye / Ashley Walsh	16	5	Ret	DSQ	DSQ	0	222
24	Dale Wood / Chris Pither	21	19	Ret	14	Ret	0	159
25	Andre Heimgartner / Ant Pedersen	111		11			0	144
26	Lee Holdsworth / Craig Baird	4	Ret	Ret	11	Ret	0	72
Pos.	Drivers	No.	**SAN** **(Victoria (state))**	**BAT** **(New South Wales)**	**SUR** **(Queensland)**		Pen.	Pts.

Colour	Result
Gold	Winner
Silver	Second place
Bronze	Third place
Green	Points classification
Blue	Non-points classification
Blue	Non-classified finish (NC)
Purple	Retired, not classified (Ret)
Red	Did not qualify (DNQ)
Red	Did not pre-qualify (DNPQ)
Black	Disqualified (DSQ)
White	Did not start (DNS)
White	Withdrew (WD)
White	Race cancelled (C)
Blank	Did not practice (DNP)
Blank	Did not arrive (DNA)
Blank	Excluded (EX)

Bold - Pole position
Italics - Fastest lap

== See also ==
- V8 Supercars
- 2014 V8 Supercar season
