= Ipswich Supercars round =

Racing Event

(Queensland) Ipswich Super 440
- Race Information
Venue	Queensland Raceway
Number of times held	20
First held	1999
- Race Format
- Race 1
Laps	39
Distance	120 km
- Race 2
Laps	39
Distance	120 km
- Race 3
Laps	63
Distance	200 km
- Last Event (2026)
- Overall Winner
(Australia) Brodie Kostecki	Dick Johnson Racing
- Race Winners
(Australia) Brodie Kostecki	Dick Johnson Racing
(Australia) Will Brown	Triple Eight Race Engineering
(Australia) Broc Feeney	Triple Eight Race Engineering

The Ipswich Super 440 (known for sponsorship reasons as the Century Batteries Ipswich Super 440) is the current name for the annual motor racing event for Supercars, held at Queensland Raceway near Ipswich, Queensland. The event has been a semi-regular part of the Supercars Championship—and its previous incarnations, the Shell Championship Series and V8 Supercars Championship—from 1999, with a hiatus between 2020 and 2024.

== Format ==
The event is staged over a three-day weekend, from Friday to Sunday. Four thirty-minute practice sessions are held, two on Friday and one each on Saturday and Sunday. Saturday features a three-stage knockout qualifying session which decides the grid positions for the following 120 kilometre sprint race. Sunday features a repeat of the Saturday qualifying format with a longer 200 km race distance following.

== History ==
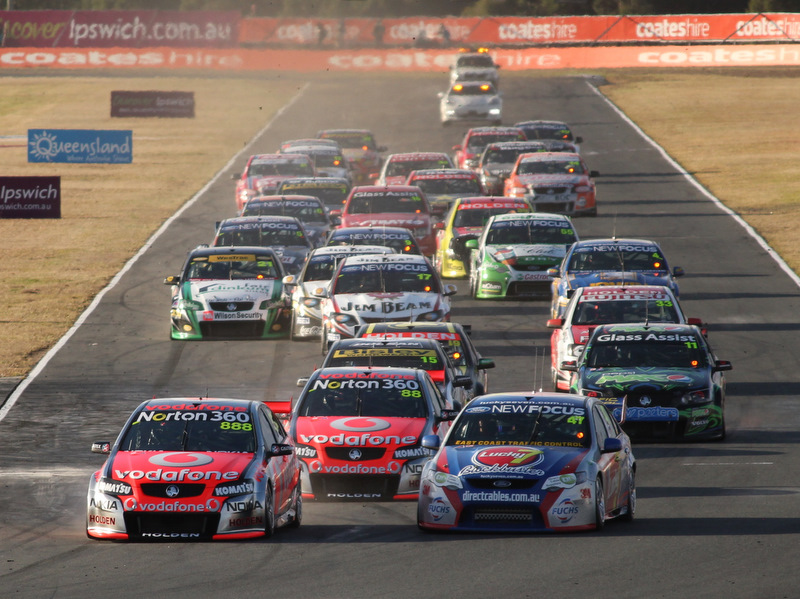
The start of a race during the 2011 event.

Queensland Raceway opened in 1999 and immediately joined the championship calendar, taking over from Lakeside Raceway as the home of the series in Queensland. In 1999 and 2000 the event hosted both a sprint round and the Queensland 500 endurance event, the first circuit to host multiple rounds in one year since Lakeside held two rounds in 1991. In the inaugural sprint event, Garth Tander scored his first career round win despite not winning a race during the weekend. He was originally declared the winner of the third race when John Bowe was disqualified for passing under a yellow flag, but Bowe was later reinstated in the results. The sprint event was dropped for 2001 with only the endurance event remaining on the calendar.

The 500-kilometre Supercars endurance race returned to Sandown Raceway in 2003 and Queensland Raceway returned to hosting a sprint round of the championship. In the aftermath of the 2004 event, round winner Marcos Ambrose was disqualified due to the discovery of an additional wire in the ECU wiring loom. The points were later reinstated on appeal. Jason Richards had a major accident during the 2005 event, after a touch from Paul Morris sent Richards' car over a kerb and into a series of rollovers. Garth Tander dominated the event in 2006 and 2007, winning five of the six races across the two years, before Mark Winterbottom won consecutive events in 2008, at which James Courtney won his first championship race, and 2009.

Craig Lowndes won five consecutive races at the event across 2011 and 2012, while Chaz Mostert won his first championship race during the 2013 event. Lowndes went on to win the event again in 2014 and 2016 to leave him with a record seven event wins at the circuit, six sprint rounds and the 2000 Queensland 500. Queensland Raceway was not included on the calendar for the 2020 Supercars Championship, the first year the circuit was not included, as either a sprint or endurance event, since it was opened in 1999.

The circuit was later considered for a substitute place on both the 2020 and 2021 calendars due to the disruption caused by the COVID-19 pandemic, however in both years the plan did not come to fruition. Eventually, after new ownership and various upgrades to facilities, the event was announced as returning to the calendar for 2025.

== Winners ==
Year	Driver	Team	Car	Report
1999^{1}	(Australia) Garth Tander	Garry Rogers Motorsport	Holden VS Commodore	
2000^{1}	(Australia) Craig Lowndes	Holden Racing Team	Holden VT Commodore	
2001 – 2002	not held			
2003	(Australia) Russell Ingall	Stone Brothers Racing	Ford BA Falcon	
2004	(Australia) Marcos Ambrose	Stone Brothers Racing	Ford BA Falcon	
2005	(Australia) Craig Lowndes	Triple Eight Race Engineering	Ford BA Falcon	
2006	(Australia) Garth Tander	HSV Dealer Team	Holden VZ Commodore	
2007	(Australia) Garth Tander	HSV Dealer Team	Holden VE Commodore	Report
2008	(Australia) Mark Winterbottom	Ford Performance Racing	Ford BF Falcon	Report
2009	(Australia) Mark Winterbottom	Ford Performance Racing	Ford FG Falcon	Report
2010	(Australia) James Courtney	Dick Johnson Racing	Ford FG Falcon	Report
2011	(Australia) Craig Lowndes	Triple Eight Race Engineering	Holden VE Commodore	Report
2012	(Australia) Craig Lowndes	Triple Eight Race Engineering	Holden VE Commodore	Report
2013	(Australia) Mark Winterbottom	Ford Performance Racing	Ford FG Falcon	Report
2014	(Australia) Craig Lowndes	Triple Eight Race Engineering	Holden VF Commodore	Report
2015	(Australia) Mark Winterbottom	Prodrive Racing Australia	Ford FG X Falcon	Report
2016	(Australia) Craig Lowndes	Triple Eight Race Engineering	Holden VF Commodore	Report
2017	(Australia) Chaz Mostert	Rod Nash Racing	Ford FG X Falcon	Report
2018	(New Zealand) Shane van Gisbergen	Triple Eight Race Engineering	Holden ZB Commodore	Report
2019	(New Zealand) Scott McLaughlin	DJR Team Penske	Ford Mustang GT	
2020 – 2024	not held			
2025	(Australia) Broc Feeney	Triple Eight Race Engineering	Chevrolet Camaro ZL1-1LE	
2026	(Australia) Brodie Kostecki	Dick Johnson Racing	Ford Mustang GT	

Notes

- ^1 – In 1999 and 2000, Queensland Raceway also hosted a second championship round, the Queensland 500.

== Multiple winners ==
=== By driver ===
Wins	Driver	Years
6	(Australia) Craig Lowndes	2000, 2005, 2011, 2012, 2014, 2016
4	(Australia) Mark Winterbottom	2008, 2009, 2013, 2015
3	(Australia) Garth Tander	1999, 2006, 2007

=== By team ===
Wins	Team
7	Triple Eight Race Engineering
4	Prodrive Racing Australia^{1}
3	Dick Johnson Racing^{2}
2	Stone Brothers Racing
2	HSV Dealer Team

=== By manufacturer ===
Wins	Manufacturer
11	Ford
9	Holden

Notes

- ^1 – Prodrive Racing Australia was known as Ford Performance Racing from 2003 to 2014, hence their statistics are combined.
- ^2 – Dick Johnson Racing was known as DJR Team Penske from 2014 to 2020, hence their statistics are combined.

== Event names and sponsors ==
- 1999–2000, 2004: Queensland Raceway
- 2003: BigPond 300
- 2005, 2007: Queensland 300
- 2006: BigPond 400
- 2008: City of Ipswich 400
- 2009: Queensland House and Land.com 300
- 2010: City of Ipswich 300
- 2011–12: Coates Hire Ipswich 300
- 2013: Coates Hire Ipswich 360
- 2014: Coates Hire Ipswich 400
- 2015: Coates Hire Ipswich Super Sprint
- 2016–18: Coates Hire Ipswich SuperSprint
- 2019: Century Batteries Ipswich SuperSprint
- 2025–26: Century Batteries Ipswich Super 440

== See also ==
- Queensland 500
- List of Australian Touring Car Championship races
