= 2014 Tyrepower Tasmania 400 =

2014 V8 Supercar championship race

Event Information
- Round 2 of 14 in the 2014 International V8 Supercars Championship
- Date: 28–30 March 2014
- Location: Launceston, Tasmania
- Venue: Symmons Plains Raceway
- Weather: Fine

Results
Race 1
Distance	42 laps	100 km
Pole position	Jamie Whincup; Triple Eight Race Engineering	51.4110
Winner	Jamie Whincup; Triple Eight Race Engineering	39:48.2632
Race 2
Distance	42 laps	100 km
Pole position	Jamie Whincup; Triple Eight Race Engineering	51.1439
Winner	Jamie Whincup; Triple Eight Race Engineering	42:46.3425
Race 3
Distance	84 laps	200 km
Pole position	Jamie Whincup; Triple Eight Race Engineering	50.9676
Winner	Craig Lowndes; Triple Eight Race Engineering	1:15:08.3240

The 2014 Tyrepower Tasmania 400 was a motor race meeting for the Australian sedan-based V8 Supercars. It was the second event of the 2014 International V8 Supercars Championship. It was held on the weekend of 28–30 March at the Symmons Plains Raceway, near Launceston, Tasmania.
