= 2014 Skycity Triple Crown =

2014 V8 Supercar championship race

(Northern Territory) 2014 Skycity Triple Crown
Event Information
- Round 6 of 14 in the 2014 International V8 Supercars Championship
- Date: 20–22 June 2014
- Location: Darwin, Northern Territory
- Venue: Hidden Valley Raceway
- Weather: Fine

Results
Race 1
Distance	35 laps	100 km
Pole position	Jamie Whincup; Triple Eight Race Engineering	1:10.1360
Winner	Jamie Whincup; Triple Eight Race Engineering	42:27.6267
Race 2
Distance	35 laps	100 km
Pole position	Jamie Whincup; Triple Eight Race Engineering	1:09.8711
Winner	Jamie Whincup; Triple Eight Race Engineering	42:26.1100
Race 3
Distance	69 laps	200 km
Pole position	Craig Lowndes; Triple Eight Race Engineering	1:08.7500
Winner	Mark Winterbottom; Ford Performance Racing	1:27:20.3010

The 2014 Skycity Triple Crown was a motor race meeting for the Australian sedan-based V8 Supercars. It was the sixth event of the 2014 International V8 Supercars Championship. It was held on the weekend of 20–22 June at the Hidden Valley Raceway, near Darwin, Northern Territory.
