= 2014 Wilson Security Sandown 500 =

2014 V8 supercar race

(Victoria (state)) 2014 Wilson Security Sandown 500
Event Information
- Round 10 of 14 in the 2014 International V8 Supercars Championship
- Date: 12–14 September 2014
- Location: Melbourne, Victoria
- Venue: Sandown International Raceway
- Weather: Fine

Results
Race 1
Distance	161 laps	500 km
Pole position	Jamie Whincup; Paul Dumbrell; Triple Eight Race Engineering	
Winner	Jamie Whincup; Paul Dumbrell; Triple Eight Race Engineering	3:22:44.3090

The 2014 Wilson Security Sandown 500 was a motor race meeting for the Australian sedan-based V8 Supercars. It was the tenth event of the 2014 International V8 Supercars Championship. It was held on the weekend of 12-14 September at the Sandown Raceway, near Melbourne, Victoria.

== Results ==
=== Qualifying ===
Pos.	No.	Name	Car	Team	Lap Time	Difference
1	1	(Australia) Jamie Whincup	Holden VF Commodore	Triple Eight Race Engineering	1:08.5730	
2	2	(Australia) Garth Tander	Holden VF Commodore	Holden Racing Team	1:08.7276	+ 0.1546s
3	33	(New Zealand) Scott McLaughlin	Volvo S60	Garry Rogers Motorsport	1:08.7786	+ 0.2056s
4	5	(Australia) Mark Winterbottom	Ford FG Falcon	Ford Performance Racing	1:08.8766	+ 0.3036s
5	22	(Australia) James Courtney	Holden VF Commodore	Holden Racing Team	1:08.8926	+ 0.3196s
6	47	(Australia) Tim Slade	Holden VF Commodore	Walkinshaw Racing	1:08.9495	+ 0.3765s
7	97	(New Zealand) Shane van Gisbergen	Holden VF Commodore	Tekno Autosports	1:08.9647	+ 0.3917s
8	55	(Australia) David Reynolds	Ford FG Falcon	Rod Nash Racing	1:09.0482	+ 0.4752s
9	888	(Australia) Craig Lowndes	Holden VF Commodore	Triple Eight Race Engineering	1:09.0848	+ 0.5118s
10	7	(Australia) Todd Kelly	Nissan Altima L33	Nissan Motorsport	1:09.1418	+ 0.5688s
11	222	(Australia) Nick Percat	Holden VF Commodore	James Rosenberg Racing	1:09.1665	+ 0.5935s
12	8	(Australia) Jason Bright	Holden VF Commodore	Brad Jones Racing	1:09.2024	+ 0.6294s
13	36	(Australia) Michael Caruso	Nissan Altima L33	Nissan Motorsport	1:09.2080	+ 0.6350s
14	15	(Australia) Rick Kelly	Nissan Altima L33	Nissan Motorsport	1:09.2334	+ 0.6604s
15	9	(Australia) Will Davison	Mercedes-Benz E63 AMG	Erebus Motorsport	1:09.2601	+ 0.6871s
16	6	(Australia) Chaz Mostert	Ford FG Falcon	Ford Performance Racing	1:09.2628	+ 0.6898s
17	4	(Australia) Lee Holdsworth	Mercedes-Benz E63 AMG	Erebus Motorsport	1:09.2690	+ 0.6960s
18	14	(New Zealand) Fabian Coulthard	Holden VF Commodore	Brad Jones Racing	1:09.4015	+ 0.8285s
19	16	(Australia) Scott Pye	Ford FG Falcon	Dick Johnson Racing	1:09.4548	+ 0.8818s
20	23	(Australia) Russell Ingall	Holden VF Commodore	Lucas Dumbrell Motorsport	1:09.4703	+ 0.8973s
21	360	(Australia) James Moffat	Nissan Altima L33	Nissan Motorsport	1:09.4815	+ 0.9085s
22	34	(Sweden) Robert Dahlgren	Volvo S60	Garry Rogers Motorsport	1:09.4884	+ 0.9154s
23	21	(Australia) Dale Wood	Holden VF Commodore	Britek Motorsport	1:09.5794	+ 1.0064s
24	18	(Australia) Jack Perkins	Ford FG Falcon	Charlie Schwerkolt Racing	1:09.7068	+ 1.1338s
25	17	(Australia) David Wall	Ford FG Falcon	Dick Johnson Racing	1:09.7787	+ 1.2057s

=== Qualifying Race 1 ===
Pos.	No.	Name	Team	Race Time	Laps
1	1	(Australia) Paul Dumbrell	Triple Eight Race Engineering	23min 28.2079sec	20
2	97	(Australia) Jonathan Webb	Tekno Autosports	+ 6.8742s	20
3	5	(Australia) Steve Owen	Ford Performance Racing	+ 11.9411s	20
4	33	(France) Alexandre Premat	Garry Rogers Motorsport	+ 15.4498s	20
5	22	(New Zealand) Greg Murphy	Holden Racing Team	+ 20.4365s	20
6	2	(Australia) Warren Luff	Holden Racing Team	+ 24.4903s	20
7	47	(Australia) Tony D'Alberto	Walkinshaw Racing	+ 24.5720s	20
8	55	(Australia) Dean Canto	Rod Nash Racing	+ 24.6984s	20
9	888	(New Zealand) Steven Richards	Triple Eight Race Engineering	+ 25.1024s	20
10	7	(United Kingdom) Alex Buncombe	Nissan Motorsport	+ 25.6996s	20
11	14	(Australia) Luke Youlden	Brad Jones Racing	+ 26.3217s	20
12	36	(Australia) Dean Fiore	Nissan Motorsport	+ 26.7415s	20
13	8	(Australia) Andrew Jones	Brad Jones Racing	+ 27.1914s	20
14	4	(New Zealand) Craig Baird	Erebus Motorsport	+ 27.4882s	20
15	222	(United Kingdom) Oliver Gavin	James Rosenberg Racing	+ 28.0770s	20
16	9	(Australia) Alex Davison	Erebus Motorsport	+ 28.4264s	20
17	15	(Australia) David Russell	Nissan Motorsport	+ 28.9397s	20
18	18	(Australia) Cam Waters	Charlie Schwerkolt Racing	+ 29.7504s	20
19	23	(Australia) Tim Blanchard	Lucas Dumbrell Motorsport	+ 30.0708s	20
20	34	(Australia) Greg Ritter	Garry Rogers Motorsport	+ 30.0809s	20
21	6	(Australia) Paul Morris	Ford Performance Racing	+ 30.7680s	20
22	360	(Australia) Taz Douglas	Nissan Motorsport	+ 35.9259s	20
23	16	(Australia) Ash Walsh	Dick Johnson Racing	+ 36.9569s	20
24	17	(Australia) Steven Johnson	Dick Johnson Racing	+ 1 Lap	19
DNF	21	(New Zealand) Chris Pither	Britek Motorsport	Engine	5

=== Qualifying Race 2 ===
Pos.	No.	Name	Team	Race Time	Laps
1	1	(Australia) Jamie Whincup	Triple Eight Race Engineering	23min 19.0225sec	20
2	97	(New Zealand) Shane van Gisbergen	Tekno Autosports	+ 1.512s	20
3	5	(Australia) Mark Winterbottom	Ford Performance Racing	+ 7.223s	20
4	33	(New Zealand) Scott McLaughlin	Garry Rogers Motorsport	+ 7.960s	20
5	2	(Australia) Garth Tander	Holden Racing Team	+ 8.767s	20
6	22	(Australia) James Courtney	Holden Racing Team	+ 9.203s	20
7	888	(Australia) Craig Lowndes	Triple Eight Race Engineering	+ 9.859s	20
8	55	(Australia) David Reynolds	Rod Nash Racing	+ 11.241s	20
9	47	(Australia) Tim Slade	Walkinshaw Racing	+ 14.100s	20
10	14	(New Zealand) Fabian Coulthard	Holden VF Commodore	+ 15.123s	20
11	7	(Australia) Todd Kelly	Nissan Motorsport	+ 15.574s	20
12	4	(Australia) Lee Holdsworth	Erebus Motorsport	+ 17.866s	20
13	36	(Australia) Michael Caruso	Nissan Motorsport	+ 18.436s	20
14	15	(Australia) Rick Kelly	Nissan Motorsport	+ 20.493s	20
15	8	(Australia) Jason Bright	Brad Jones Racing	+ 21.553s	20
16	222	(Australia) Nick Percat	James Rosenberg Racing	+ 22.281s	20
17	6	(Australia) Chaz Mostert	Ford Performance Racing	+ 22.597s	20
18	9	(Australia) Will Davison	Erebus Motorsport	+ 24.103s	20
19	16	(Australia) Scott Pye	Dick Johnson Racing	+ 24.504s	20
20	18	(Australia) Jack Perkins	Charlie Schwerkolt Racing	+ 26.406s	20
21	34	(Sweden) Robert Dahlgren	Garry Rogers Motorsport	+ 28.127s	20
22	360	(Australia) James Moffat	Nissan Motorsport	+ 28.502s	20
23	17	(Australia) David Wall	Dick Johnson Racing	+ 28.9119s	20
24	23	(Australia) Russell Ingall	Lucas Dumbrell Motorsport	+ 32.6455s	20
25	21	(Australia) Dale Wood	Britek Motorsport	+ 33.3084s	20

=== Race ===
Pos.	No.	Name	Team	Car	Laps	Time/Retired	Grid	Points
1	1	(Australia) Jamie Whincup (Australia) Paul Dumbrell	Triple Eight Race Engineering	Holden VF Commodore	161	3hr 22min 44.3090sec	1	300
2	22	(Australia) James Courtney (New Zealand) Greg Murphy	Holden Racing Team	Holden VF Commodore	161	+ 2.653s	6	276
3	2	(Australia) Garth Tander (Australia) Warren Luff	Holden Racing Team	Holden VF Commodore	161	+ 5.209s	5	258
4	888	(Australia) Craig Lowndes (New Zealand) Steven Richards	Triple Eight Race Engineering	Holden VF Commodore	161	+ 5.673s	7	240
5	16	(Australia) Scott Pye (Australia) Ash Walsh	Dick Johnson Racing	Ford FG Falcon	161	+ 8.958s	19	222
6	97	(New Zealand) Shane van Gisbergen (Australia) Jonathon Webb	Tekno Autosports	Holden VF Commodore	161	+ 12.755s	2	204
7	6	(Australia) Chaz Mostert (Australia) Paul Morris	Ford Performance Racing	Ford FG Falcon	161	+ 13.228s	17	192
8	33	(New Zealand) Scott McLaughlin (France) Alexandre Premat	Garry Rogers Motorsport	Volvo S60	161	+ 15.139s	4	180
9	55	(Australia) David Reynolds (Australia) Dean Canto	Rod Nash Racing	Ford FG Falcon	161	+ 17.210s	8	168
10	5	(Australia) Mark Winterbottom (Australia) Steve Owen	Ford Performance Racing	Ford FG Falcon	161	+ 21.063s	3	156
11	14	(New Zealand) Fabian Coulthard (Australia) Luke Youlden	Brad Jones Racing	Holden VF Commodore	161	+ 22.210s	10	144
12	47	(Australia) Tim Slade (Australia) Tony D'Alberto	Walkinshaw Racing	Holden VF Commodore	161	+ 22.981s	9	138
13	15	(Australia) Rick Kelly (Australia) David Russell	Nissan Motorsport	Nissan Altima L33	161	+ 23.269s	14	132
14	23	(Australia) Russell Ingall (Australia) Tim Blanchard	Lucas Dumbrell Motorsport	Holden VF Commodore	160	+ 1 Lap	24	126
15	18	(Australia) Jack Perkins (Australia) Cam Waters	Charlie Schwerkolt Racing	Ford FG Falcon	160	+ 1 Lap	20	120
16	17	(Australia) David Wall (Australia) Steven Johnson	Dick Johnson Racing	Ford FG Falcon	160	+ 1 Lap	23	114
17	34	(Sweden) Robert Dahlgren (Australia) Greg Ritter	Garry Rogers Motorsport	Volvo S60	160	+ 1 Lap	21	108
18	36	(Australia) Michael Caruso (Australia) Dean Fiore	Nissan Motorsport	Nissan Altima L33	160	+ 1 Lap	13	102
19	21	(Australia) Dale Wood (New Zealand) Chris Pither	Britek Motorsport	Holden VF Commodore	160	+ 1 Lap	25	96
20	7	(Australia) Todd Kelly (United Kingdom) Alex Buncombe	Nissan Motorsport	Nissan Altima L33	160	+ 1 Lap	11	90
21	9	(Australia) Will Davison (Australia) Alex Davison	Erebus Motorsport	Mercedes-Benz E63 AMG	159	+ 2 Laps	18	84
22	222	(Australia) Nick Percat (United Kingdom) Oliver Gavin	James Rosenberg Racing	Holden VF Commodore	127	+ 34 Laps	16	78
DNF	4	(Australia) Lee Holdsworth (New Zealand) Craig Baird	Erebus Motorsport	Mercedes-Benz E63 AMG	130	Accident	12	
DNF	8	(Australia) Jason Bright (Australia) Andrew Jones	Brad Jones Racing	Holden VF Commodore	111	Accident damage	15	
DNF	360	(Australia) James Moffat (Australia) Taz Douglas	Nissan Motorsport	Nissan Altima L33	15	Fuel filler	22	
