= 2014 Castrol Edge Gold Coast 600 =

2014 V8 Supercar championship race

Coordinates: 27°59′23″S 153°25′40″E

(Queensland) 2014 Castrol Edge Gold Coast 600
Event Information
- Round 12 of 14 in the 2014 International V8 Supercars Championship
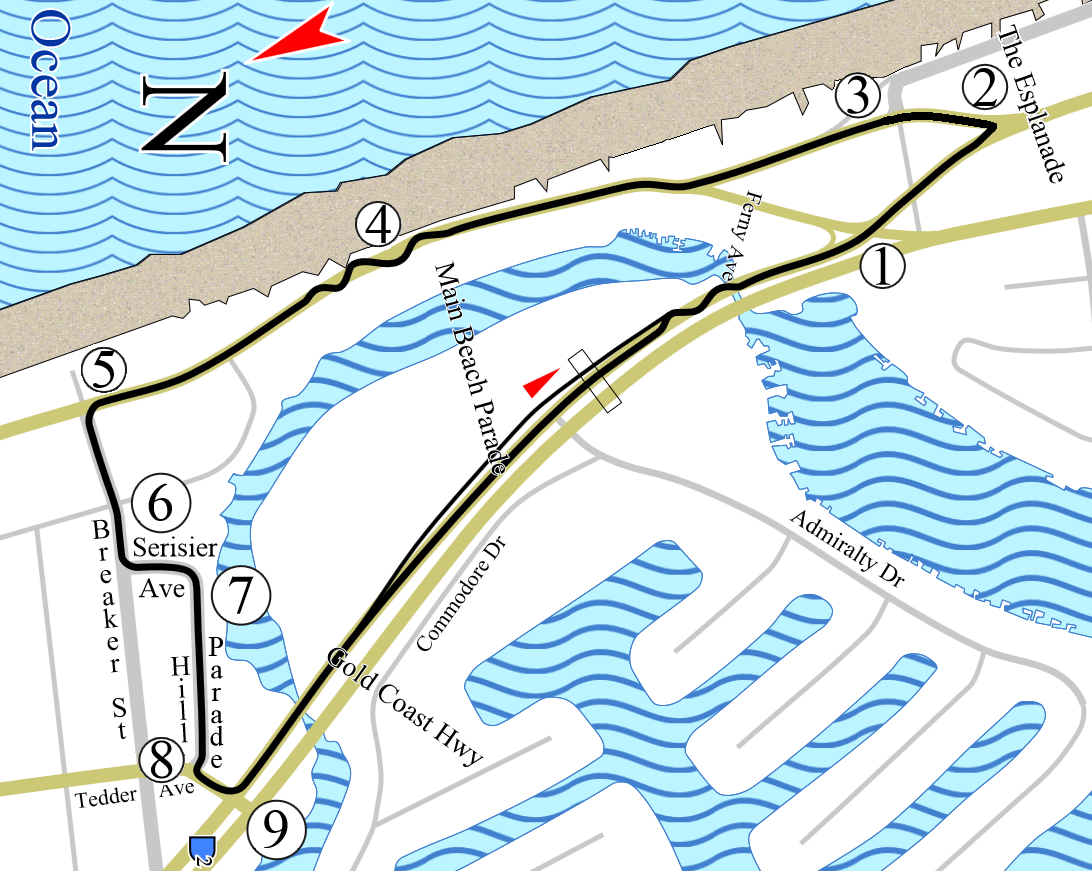
- Date: 24–26 October 2014
- Location: Surfers Paradise, Queensland
- Venue: Surfers Paradise Street Circuit
- Weather: Fine

Results
Race 1
Distance	102 laps	300 km
Pole position	Shane van Gisbergen; Tekno Autosports	1:11.6478
Winner	Shane van Gisbergen; Jonathon Webb; Tekno Autosports	2:13:24.0986
Race 2
Distance	102 laps	300 km
Pole position	Scott McLaughlin; Garry Rogers Motorsport	1:11.0273
Winner	Jamie Whincup; Paul Dumbrell; Triple Eight Race Engineering	2:13:00.3105

The 2014 Castrol Edge Gold Coast 600 was a motor race for V8 Supercars. It was the twelfth event of the 2014 International V8 Supercars Championship, held from 24–26 October at the Surfers Paradise Street Circuit on the Gold Coast, Queensland.

Race 31 saw the Tekno Autosports entry of Shane van Gisbergen and Jonathon Webb take the chequered flag after qualifying on pole. Championship leader Jamie Whincup and co-driver Paul Dumbrell came home in second position. Mark Winterbottom originally finished third, but was penalised for bumping into Tim Slade on the final lap. Slade and co-driver Tony D'Alberto were promoted to third.

Whincup and Dumbrell took out Race 32 and the Pirtek Enduro Cup for 2014. Garry Rogers Motorsport's Scott McLaughlin, and Frenchman Alexandre Prémat, came second after starting on pole. The Nissan Altima of Michael Caruso and Dean Fiore rounded out the podium. The second race finished time certain following extended periods of the safety car.

== Championship Points ==
- After 32 of 38 races.

Pos	No	Name	Team	Points
1	1	Jamie Whincup	Triple Eight Race Engineering	2835
2	5	Mark Winterbottom	Ford Performance Racing	2433
3	97	Shane van Gisbergen	Tekno Autosports	2357
4	888	Craig Lowndes	Triple Eight Race Engineering	2331
5	14	Fabian Coulthard	Brad Jones Racing	2192
