= 2014 Perth 400 =

2014 V8 Supercar championship race

(Western Australia) 2014 Perth 400
Event Information
- Round 5 of 14 in the 2014 International V8 Supercars Championship
- Date: 16–18 May 2014
- Location: Perth, Western Australia
- Venue: Barbagallo Raceway
- Weather: Fine

Results
Race 1
| Distance | 42 laps | 100 km |
| Pole position | Scott McLaughlin; Garry Rogers Motorsport | 55.4635 |
| Winner | Scott McLaughlin; Garry Rogers Motorsport | 41:12.4849 |
Race 2
| Distance | 42 laps | 100 km |
| Pole position | Craig Lowndes; Triple Eight Race Engineering | 55.2979 |
| Winner | Craig Lowndes; Triple Eight Race Engineering | 40:59.4868 |
Race 3
| Distance | 83 laps | 200 km |
| Pole position | Craig Lowndes; Triple Eight Race Engineering | 55.2266 |
| Winner | Chaz Mostert; Ford Performance Racing | 1:21:35.0015 |

The 2014 Perth 400 was a motor race meeting for the Australian sedan-based V8 Supercars. It was the fifth event of the 2014 International V8 Supercars Championship. It was held on the weekend of 16–18 May at the Barbagallo Raceway, near Wanneroo, Western Australia.
