= 2014 Castrol Townsville 500 =

2014 V8 Supercar championship race

(Queensland) 2014 Castrol Townsville 500
Event Information
- Round 7 of 14 in the 2014 International V8 Supercars Championship
- Date: 4–6 July 2014
- Location: Townsville, Queensland
- Venue: Townsville Street Circuit
- Weather: Fine

Results
Race 1
Distance	44 laps	125 km
Pole position	James Courtney; Holden Racing Team	1:12.8026
Winner	Jamie Whincup; Triple Eight Race Engineering	59:48.1702
Race 2
Distance	44 laps	125 km
Pole position	Fabian Coulthard; Brad Jones Racing	1:13.0169
Winner	Garth Tander; Holden Racing Team	57:38.3580
Race 3
Distance	88 laps	250 km
Pole position	Craig Lowndes; Triple Eight Race Engineering	1:13.0978
Winner	Jamie Whincup; Triple Eight Race Engineering	1:54:24.2583

The 2014 Castrol Townsville 500 - Driven by TAFE Queensland was a motor race meeting for the Australian sedan-based V8 Supercars. It was the seventh event of the 2014 International V8 Supercars Championship. It was held on the weekend of 4–6 July at the Townsville Street Circuit, at Townsville, Queensland.
