= 2014 Plus Fitness Phillip Island 400 =

2014 V8 Supercar championship race

(Victoria (state)) 2014 Plus Fitness Phillip Island 400
Event Information
- Round 13 of 14 in the 2014 International V8 Supercars Championship
- Date: 14–16 November 2014
- Location: Phillip Island, Victoria
- Venue: Phillip Island Grand Prix Circuit
- Weather: Fine

Results
Race 1
Distance	23 laps	100 km
Pole position	Scott McLaughlin; Garry Rogers Motorsport	1:31.3935
Winner	Scott McLaughlin; Garry Rogers Motorsport	36:00.0974
Race 2
Distance	23 laps	100 km
Pole position	Jamie Whincup; Triple Eight Race Engineering	1:31.0578
Winner	Jamie Whincup; Triple Eight Race Engineering	35:54.1514
Race 3
Distance	45 laps	200 km
Pole position	Jamie Whincup; Triple Eight Race Engineering	1:31.1812
Winner	Scott McLaughlin; Garry Rogers Motorsport	1:13:59.6920

The 2014 Plus Fitness Phillip Island 400 was a motor race meeting for the Australian sedan-based V8 Supercars. It was the thirteenth and penultimate event of the 2014 International V8 Supercars Championship. It was held on the weekend of 14–16 November at the Phillip Island Grand Prix Circuit, at Phillip Island, Victoria.

It was a horrible start to the weekend for Kiwis Shane van Gisbergen and Fabian Coulthard as they came together after turn 1 at the start Race 33 Qualifying. Fellow Kiwi Scott McLaughlin claimed pole for Race 33 and converted it to a win. Triple Eight Race Engineering teammates Craig Lowndes and Jamie Whincup finished second and third respectively.

Whincup managed to claim pole and win for Race 34. The win for Whincup also meant that he secured the 2014 Championship, and his sixth V8 Supercar Championship title. Closest championship rivals Lowndes finished the race in second place and Mark Winterbottom in third place.

Whincup and McLaughlin started on the front row for Race 35, but it was McLaughlin who took the lead from Whincup at turn 2 on the first lap. At a quarter race distance, the Safety Car was called out after David Wall ran wide at the final turn. This meant that all cars were called in to do mandatory pit stops, as well as Garth Tander taking the lead from McLaughlin in the process. Tander and McLaughlin remained together for the rest of the race until the final lap. After the final corner on the last lap, Tander's car ran out of fuel. This allowed McLaughlin to snatch the lead only metres before the finish line and take the race win, with Tander coasting to second place. Winterbottom narrowly beat pole sitter Whincup to the line to finish third.
