= 2014 Winton 400 =

2014 V8 Supercar championship race

(Victoria (state)) 2014 Winton 400
Event Information
- Round 3 of 14 in the 2014 International V8 Supercars Championship
- Date: 4–6 April 2014
- Location: Benalla, Victoria
- Venue: Winton Motor Raceway
- Weather: Fine

Results
Race 1
Distance	34 laps	100 km
Pole position	Fabian Coulthard; Brad Jones Racing	1:20.0444
Winner	Fabian Coulthard; Brad Jones Racing	53:03.9676
Race 2
Distance	34 laps	100 km
Pole position	Fabian Coulthard; Brad Jones Racing	1:19.6538
Winner	Lee Holdsworth; Erebus Motorsport	48:27.5844
Race 3
Distance	67 laps	200 km
Pole position	Scott McLaughlin; Garry Rogers Motorsport	1:21.5092
Winner	Mark Winterbottom; Ford Performance Racing	1:36:23.4427

The 2014 Winton 400 was a motor race meeting for the Australian sedan-based V8 Supercars. It was the third event of the 2014 International V8 Supercars Championship. It was held on the weekend of 4–6 April at the Winton Motor Raceway, near Winton, Victoria. It was Mark Winterbottom's first win of the year.
