= 2014 Sydney Motorsport Park 400 =

2014 V8 Supercar championship race

(New South Wales) 2014 Sydney Motorsport Park 400
Event Information
- Round 9 of 14 in the 2014 International V8 Supercars Championship
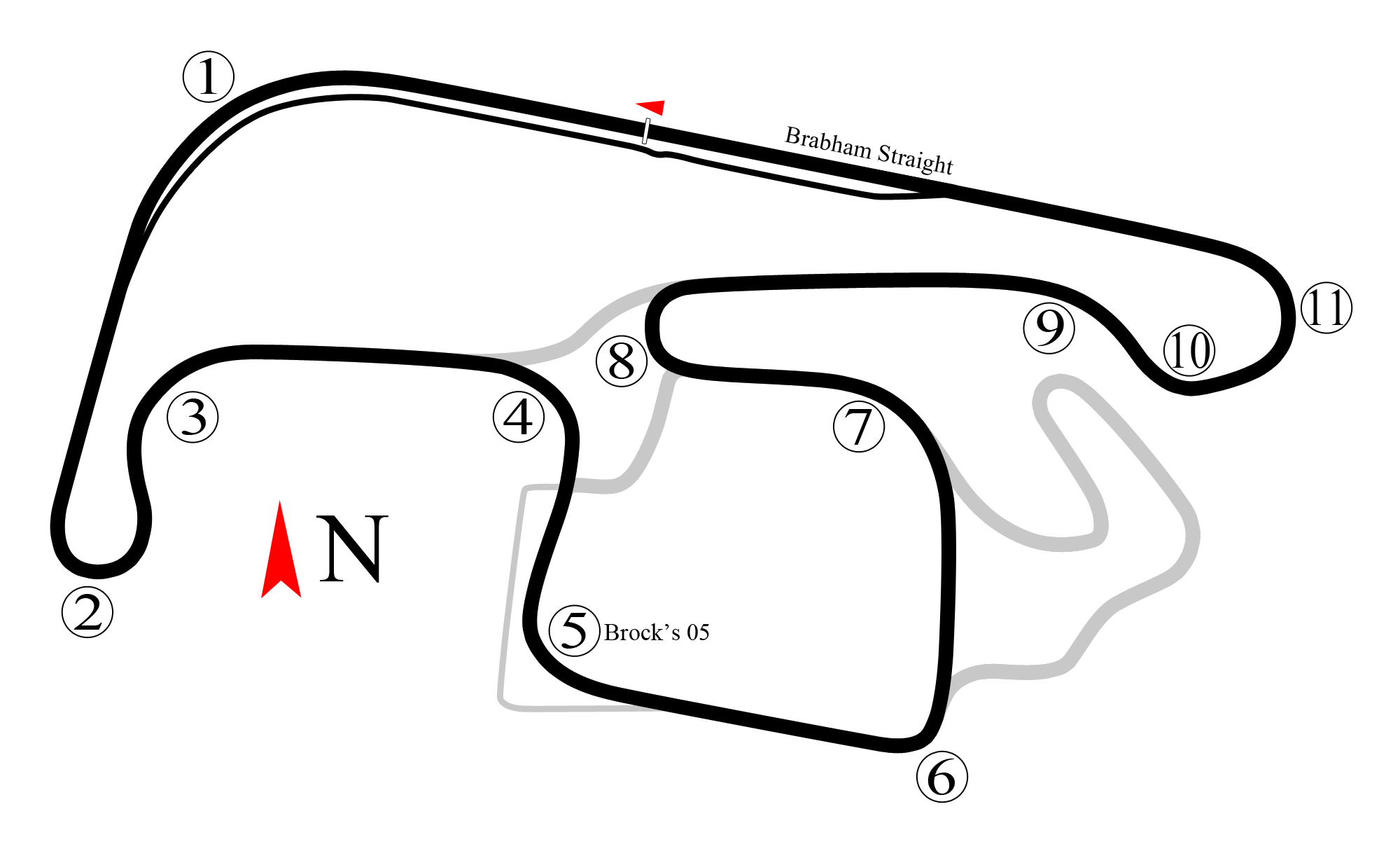
- Date: 22–24 August 2014
- Location: Eastern Creek, New South Wales
- Venue: Sydney Motorsport Park
- Weather: Rain on Saturday, fine on Sunday

Results
Race 1
Distance	25 laps	98 km
Pole position	Jamie Whincup; Triple Eight Race Engineering	1:30.7166
Winner	Shane van Gisbergen; Tekno Autosports	47:54.8943
Race 2
Distance	24 laps	94 km
Pole position	Scott McLaughlin; Garry Rogers Motorsport	1:30.3012
Winner	Shane van Gisbergen; Tekno Autosports	47:02.9788
Race 3
Distance	51 laps	200 km
Pole position	Scott McLaughlin; Garry Rogers Motorsport	1:29.7131
Winner	Scott McLaughlin; Garry Rogers Motorsport	1:24:14.1670

The 2014 Sydney Motorsport Park 400 was a motor race meeting for the Australian sedan-based V8 Supercars. It was the ninth event of the 2014 International V8 Supercars Championship. It was held on the weekend of 22–24 August at the Sydney Motorsport Park, near Sydney, New South Wales.[1]
