= 2014 Coates Hire Ipswich 400 =

2014 V8 Supercar championship race

(Queensland) 2014 Coates Hire Ipswich 400
Event Information
- Round 8 of 14 in the 2014 International V8 Supercars Championship
- Date: 1–3 August 2014
- Location: Ipswich, Queensland
- Venue: Queensland Raceway
- Weather: Fine

Results
Race 1
Distance	33 laps	100 km
Pole position	Craig Lowndes; Triple Eight Race Engineering	1:09.4221
Winner	Jamie Whincup; Triple Eight Race Engineering	39:15.7017
Race 2
Distance	33 laps	100 km
Pole position	Scott McLaughlin; Garry Rogers Motorsport	1:09.2906
Winner	Jamie Whincup; Triple Eight Race Engineering	39:06.3767
Race 3
Distance	65 laps	200 km
Pole position	James Moffat; Nissan Motorsport	1:09.1539
Winner	James Courtney; Holden Racing Team	1:18:18.0550

The 2014 Coates Hire Ipswich 400 was a motor race meeting for the Australian sedan-based V8 Supercars. It was the eighth event of the 2014 International V8 Supercars Championship. It was held on the weekend of 1–3 August at the Queensland Raceway, near Ipswich, Queensland.
