= 2008 Fujitsu V8 Supercar Series =

Motor racing competition

The 2008 Fujitsu V8 Supercars Series was the ninth running of the Fujitsu V8 Supercars Series, the second-tier V8 Supercar series. It began on 21 February at the Clipsal 500 and ended on 7 December at Oran Park Raceway in New South Wales after seven rounds.

== Race calendar ==
The series comprised six rounds in support of the 2008 V8 Supercar Championship Series and one stand-alone round.

Rd.	Event	Circuit	Location	Date	Winner
1	(Australia) Clipsal 500	Adelaide Street Circuit	Adelaide, South Australia	21-24 Feb	Steve Owen
2	(Australia) Wakefield Park	Wakefield Park	Goulburn, New South Wales	4-6 Apr	Tim Slade
3	(Australia) Midas 400	Sandown Raceway	Melbourne, Victoria	7-9 Jun	Steve Owen
4	(Australia) City of Ipswich 300	Queensland Raceway	Ipswich, Queensland	18-20 Jul	Dean Canto
5	(Australia) Winton	Winton Motor Raceway	Benalla, Victoria	1-3 Aug	Steve Owen
6	(Australia) Supercheap Auto Bathurst 1000	Mount Panorama Circuit	Bathurst, New South Wales	9-12 Oct	Dean Canto
7	(Australia) Oran Park	Oran Park Raceway	Sydney, New South Wales	4-7 Dec	Jack Perkins

== Teams and drivers ==
The following teams and drivers have competed during the 2008 Fujitsu V8 Supercar Series. This was the last season the Ford AU Falcon was eligible.

Team	Vehicle	No	Driver	Rounds
Sieders Racing Team	Ford AU Falcon	13	(Australia) Colin Sieders	1-2
Sieders Racing Team	Ford BA Falcon	13	(Australia) Colin Sieders	3, 6-7
Sieders Racing Team	Ford BA Falcon	19	(Australia) David Sieders	All
Slade Speed	Holden VZ Commodore	23	(Australia) Tim Slade	All
Howard Racing	Ford BA Falcon	27	(Australia) Karl Reindler	All
Howard Racing	Ford BA Falcon	37	(Australia) Dean Canto	All
MW Motorsport	Ford BA Falcon	28	(Australia) Matthew White	1, 6
MW Motorsport	Ford BA Falcon	28	(New Zealand) Andy Knight	4
MW Motorsport	Ford BA Falcon	28	(Australia) Brad Lowe	7
MW Motorsport	Ford BA Falcon	29	(Australia) Grant Denyer	1-5
MW Motorsport	Ford BA Falcon	29	(Australia) Damian Assaillit	6-7
Jay Motorsport	Holden VZ Commodore	28	(Australia) Nandi Kiss	5
Jay Motorsport	Holden VZ Commodore	42	(Australia) Jay Verdnik	1-6
Jay Motorsport	Holden VZ Commodore	42	(Australia) Shane Price	7
Racer Industries	Ford BA Falcon	30	(New Zealand) Craig Baird	4
A.N.T. Racing	Ford BA Falcon	30	(Australia) Tony Evangelou	3, 6
Peters Motorsport	Ford BA Falcon	32	(Australia) Luke Youlden	6-7
Peters Motorsport	Ford BA Falcon	96	(Australia) Joel Spychala	1-5
TAG Motorsport	Holden VZ Commodore	35	(Australia) Tony Bates	2-7
TAG Motorsport	Holden VZ Commodore	36	(Australia) Geoff Emery	All
Eggleston Motorsport	Holden VZ Commodore	38	(Australia) Ben Eggleston	All
Eggleston Motorsport	Holden VZ Commodore	54	(Australia) Taz Douglas	4-5
Eggleston Motorsport	Holden VZ Commodore	54	(New Zealand) Simon Wills	6
Greg Murphy Racing	Holden VZ Commodore	44	(Australia) James Bergmuller	All
Greg Murphy Racing	Holden VZ Commodore	46	(Australia) Dale Wood	All
Greg Murphy Racing	Holden VZ Commodore	47	(Australia) Sam Walter	All
O’Brien Motorsport	Ford BA Falcon	45	(Australia) Shannon O'Brien	4-6
Image Racing	Ford BA Falcon	48	(Australia) Dean Neville	6
Image Racing	Ford AU Falcon	49	(Australia) Taz Douglas	1-3
Image Racing	Ford BA Falcon	49	(Australia) Terry Wyhoon	5-6
Loadsman Racing Team	Holden VZ Commodore	54	(Australia) Steve Owen	2
Loadsman Racing Team	Holden VZ Commodore	62	(Australia) Steve Owen	1, 3-7
Novocastrian Motorsport	Holden VZ Commodore	58	(Australia) Drew Russell	All
Race Image Motorsports	Ford BA Falcon	60	(Australia) Damian Assaillit	1-5
Race Image Motorsports	Ford BA Falcon	60	(Australia) Jose Fernandez	6
Race Image Motorsports	Ford BA Falcon	60	(New Zealand) Gene Rollinson	7
Race Image Motorsports	Ford BA Falcon	61	(New Zealand) Gene Rollinson	1, 4-5
Race Image Motorsports	Ford BA Falcon	61	(Australia) Clayton Pyne	2
Race Image Motorsports	Ford BA Falcon	61	(Australia) Ryan Brown	6
Independent Race Cars Australia	Holden VZ Commodore	64	(Australia) Michael Trimble	All
Independent Race Cars Australia	Holden VZ Commodore	500	(Australia) Jack Perkins	All
Shane Beikoff Racing	Ford AU Falcon	68	(Australia) Shane Beikoff	2, 6-7
Shane Beikoff Racing	Ford AU Falcon	68	(Australia) Jonathan Beikoff	3-4
Capital Finance	Holden VZ Commodore	70	(Australia) Ashley Cooper	1
Action Racing	Holden VZ Commodore	73	(Australia) Marcus Zukanovic	All
West Coast Racing	Holden VZ Commodore	74	(Australia) Mark McNally	All
McGill Motorsport	Ford AU Falcon	75	(Australia) Aaron McGill	1-2
McGill Motorsport	Holden VY Commodore	75	(Australia) Aaron McGill	3-5
McGill Motorsport	Ford BA Falcon	75	(Australia) Aaron McGill	6-7
Wollongong Performance Racing	Holden VZ Commodore	85	(Australia) Andrew Fisher	6-7
Stone Brothers Racing	Ford BA Falcon	94	(Australia) Jonathon Webb	All
Sydney Star Racing	Holden VZ Commodore	95	(Australia) Brett Holdsworth	All
Sydney Star Racing	Holden VZ Commodore	98	(Australia) Brett Hobson	1–3, 6–7
Tony D'Alberto Racing	Holden VZ Commodore	99	(Australia) David Reynolds	All

== Points system ==
Points were awarded for each race to any driver that had completed 75% of race distance and was running on the completion of the final lap.

Pos	1st	2nd	3rd	4th	5th	6th	7th	8th	9th	10th	11th	12th	13th	14th	15th	16th	17th	18th	19th	20th	21st	22nd	23rd	24th	25th	26th	27th	28th	29th
Rounds 1, 6 & 7	150	138	129	120	111	102	96	90	84	78	72	69	66	63	60	57	54	51	48	45	42	39	36	33	30	27	24	21	18
Rounds 2 - 5	100	92	86	80	74	68	64	60	56	52	48	46	44	42	40	38	36	34	32	30	28	26	24	22	20	18	16	14	12

== Driver standings ==
Pos	Driver	ADE		WAK			SAN			QLD			WIN			BAT		ORA		Pts
1	Steve Owen	1	1	1	2	14	1	10	1	2	3	2	2	1	1	4	3	5	17	1762
2	Dean Canto	Ret	10	2	27	1	2	11	2	1	2	1	1	4	7	2	1	1	3	1621
3	Jonathon Webb	9	19	3	5	7	6	3	4	3	13	4	6	8	4	1	2	3	6	1527
4	David Reynolds	17	9	5	3	4	5	4	3	4	6	6	5	3	3	5	4	11	5	1494
5	Jack Perkins	2	2	4	14	5	26	Ret	11	6	Ret	Ret	3	2	2	3	6	2	1	1399
6	Dale Wood	4	3	Ret	10	Ret	3	5	19	5	8	3	Ret	9	5	6	5	13	Ret	1122
7	Tim Slade	3	Ret	7	1	2	11	20	14	24	24	20	7	6	6	27	Ret	4	2	1061
8	Karl Reindler	8	7	8	20	11	4	7	5	19	7	9	9	5	9	28	12	9	Ret	1056
9	Michael Trimble	7	4	13	6	3	7	2	11	17	11	10	4	Ret	Ret	8	9	Ret	20	1053
10	Mark McNally	15	11	6	4	Ret	14	8	8	Ret	16	16	13	14	8	11	22	6	7	973
11	Marcus Zukanovic	13	8	17	7	17	8	6	7	9	5	12	19	Ret	16	Ret	14	24	4	946
12	Damian Assaillit	18	12	14	15	16	16	12	9	18	Ret	18	12	16	12	9	7	12	12	896
13	Sam Walter	11	21	10	9	12	12	13	12	7	9	7	10	20	Ret	Ret	DNS	8	8	850
14	Jay Verdnik	12	14	9	16	6	9	9	6	Ret	12	28	11	12	14	10	8			838
15	Grant Denyer	5	5	Ret	11	9	10	1	25	10	1	5	Ret	13	11					816
16	Drew Russell	26	23	12	8	8	15	Ret	17	15	Ret	22	17	10	15	20	15	16	10	739
17	Geoff Emery	19	13	20	18	Ret	19	17	18	11	14	13	8	7	20	15	Ret	20	18	724
18	David Sieders	25	22	18	13	10	25	19	20	13	15	17	14	Ret	21	Ret	19	7	9	699
19	Brett Holdsworth	23	16	15	17	13	17	25	22	20	23	21	16	11	10	30	23	14	23	665
20	James Bergmuller	24	18	23	26	Ret	20	23	23	21	22	24	20	15	18	23	20	18	16	573
21	Brett Hobson	10	6	11	Ret	Ret	13	14	13							DNS	18	10	Ret	487
22	Tony Bates			24	23	19	21	15	16	25	20	19	23	Ret	22	17	24	25	Ret	433
23	Aaron McGill	22	24	26	25	Ret	24	Ret	27	22	Ret	27	24	19	19	21	16	Ret	21	417
24	Ben Eggleston	DNS	DNS	16	21	15	18	18	Ret	Ret	Ret	26	21	18	Ret	18	Ret	17	22nd	398
25	Gene Rollinson	14	Ret							12	10	11	15	Ret	13			21	19	383
26	Joel Spychala	20	15	25	20	Ret	23	16	15	Ret	19	29	22	21	Ret					355
27	Matthew White	6	25													7	10			306
28	Colin Sieders	21	20	21	12	Ret	22	Ret	26							29	Ret	Ret	15	283
29	Luke Youlden															19	11	15	13	246
30	Shannon O'Brien									14	21	15	18	22	17	22	Ret			245
31	Craig Baird									8	4	8								200
32	Taz Douglas	Ret	17	Ret	DNS	DNS	Ret	22	Ret	Ret	18	23	26	17	Ret					192
33	Tony Evangelou						Ret	21	21							12	13			191
34	Shane Price																	19	11	120
35	Andy Knight									16	17	14								116
36	Shane Beikoff			22	24	Ret										Ret	26	22	Ret	114
37	Terry Wyhoon												25	Ret	Ret	26	17			101
38	Brad Lowe																	23	14	99
39	Clayton Pyne			19	22	18														92
40	Andrew Fisher															16	Ret	26	Ret	84
41	Dean Neville															24	21			75
42	José Fernández															13	Ret			66
43	Jonathan Beikoff						27	24	24	23	25	25								64
44	Simon Wills															14	Ret			63
45	Ryan Brown															25	25			60
46	Ashley Cooper	16	Ret																	57
47	Nandi Kiss												27	Ret	Ret					16

Colour	Result
Gold	Winner
Silver	Second place
Bronze	Third place
Green	Points classification
Blue	Non-points classification
Blue	Non-classified finish (NC)
Purple	Retired, not classified (Ret)
Red	Did not qualify (DNQ)
Red	Did not pre-qualify (DNPQ)
Black	Disqualified (DSQ)
White	Did not start (DNS)
White	Withdrew (WD)
White	Race cancelled (C)
Blank	Did not practice (DNP)
Blank	Did not arrive (DNA)
Blank	Excluded (EX)
