= Drew Russell =

Australian racing driver (born 1988)

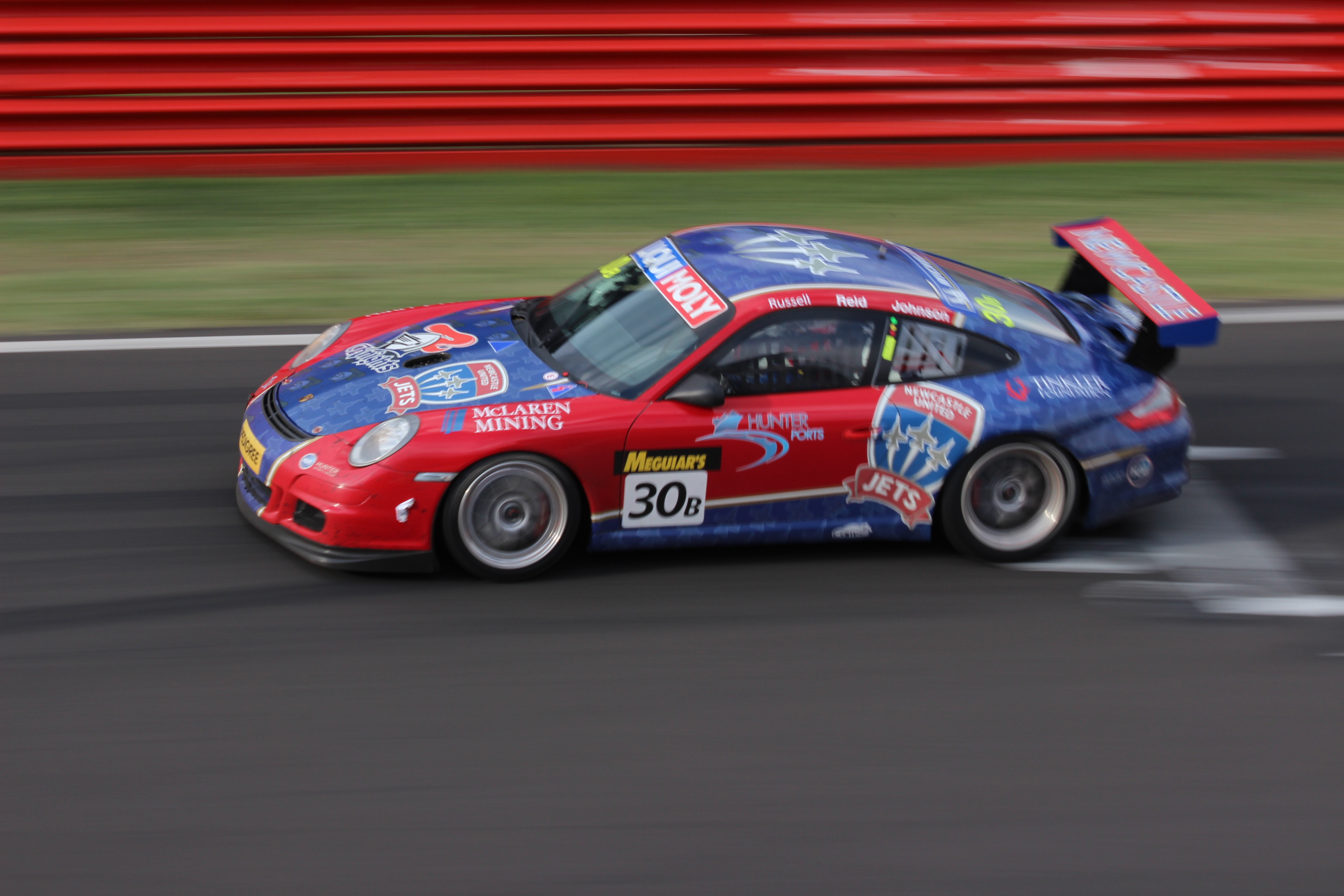
- Nationality: Australian
- Born: 24 May 1988 (age 38) Newcastle, New South Wales
- Relatives: Aaren Russell (brother); Wayne Russell (father)

Dunlop V8 Supercar Series career
- Debut season: 2007
- Current team: Novocastrian Motorsport
- Car number: 58
- Starts: 112
- Wins: 0
- Podiums: 2
- Poles: 0
- Fastest laps: 0
- Best finish: 7th in 2013

Previous series
- 2004-06 2015 2014: Australian Production Car Championship; Supercars Championship; V8 Touring Car National Series

Drew Russell (born 24 May 1988) is an Australian racing driver. He formerly competed in the Dunlop V8 Supercar Series and raced in the 2015 Supercheap Auto Bathurst 1000 with his family team, Novocastrian Motorsport.

== Career summary ==
=== Production Cars ===
Russell started in the Australian Production Car Championship in 2004 under the guidance of his father and former V8 Supercar driver Wayne Russell driving a Honda S2000. In 2005, he finished second outright and won Class A.

In 2022, Russell returned to win the Australian Production Car Series with his father Wayne driving also.

=== V8 Supercars ===
In 2007, Russell moved into the Fujitsu V8 Supercar Series completing the whole season in his family-run Novocastrian Motorsport team. He ran full time seven years in the series with a best result of seventh in 2013.

In 2015 and 2016, Russell raced in only one event each season.

2014 saw Russell switch to the third tier 2014 Kumho Tyres V8 Touring Car Series running in six races and finishing sixth in the series.

In 2015, again in his family-run Novocastrian Motorsport team, Russell and his brother Aaren qualified as a wildcard for the 2015 Supercheap Auto Bathurst 1000 finishing seventeenth.

== Results ==
=== Career summary ===
Season	Series	Position	Car	Team
2004	Australian Production Car Championship - Class A	7th	Honda S2000	Novocastrian Motorsport
2005	Australian Production Car Championship - Class A	1st	Honda S2000	Novocastrian Motorsport
2005	Australian Production Car Championship	2nd	Honda S2000	Novocastrian Motorsport
2006	Australian Production Car Championship - Class A	7th	Honda S2000	Novocastrian Motorsport
2006	Australian Production Car Championship	9th	Honda S2000	Novocastrian Motorsport
2007	Fujitsu V8 Supercar Series	40th	Holden Commodore VX	Novocastrian Motorsport
2008	Fujitsu V8 Supercar Series	16th	Holden Commodore VZ	Novocastrian Motorsport
2009	Fujitsu V8 Supercar Series	13th	Ford Falcon BF	Race Image Motorsport; Novocastrian Motorsport
2010	Fujitsu V8 Supercar Series	10th	Ford Falcon BF	Novocastrian Motorsport
2011	Fujitsu V8 Supercar Series	16th	Ford Falcon BF	Novocastrian Motorsport
2012	Dunlop V8 Supercar Series	11th	Ford Falcon BF	Novocastrian Motorsport
2013	Dunlop V8 Supercar Series	7th	Ford Falcon FG	Novocastrian Motorsport
2014	Kumho Tyres V8 Touring Car Series	6th	Ford Falcon BF	STR Truck Bodies
2015	International V8 Supercars Championship	52nd	Holden Commodore VF	Novocastrian Motorsport
2015	Dunlop V8 Supercar Series	33rd	Ford Falcon FG	Novocastrian Motorsport
2016	Dunlop Supercars Series	28th	Ford Falcon FG	STR Truck Bodies
2022	Australian Production Car Series	1st	BMW M3	Novocastrian Motorsport

=== V8 Supercars Development Series results ===
(key) (Race results only)

V8 Supercars Development Series results
Year	Team	Car	1	2	3	4	5	6	7	8	9	10	11	12	13	14	15	16	17	18	Position	Points
2007	Novocastrian Motorsport	Holden Commodore VX	ADE; 1	ADE; 2	WAK; 1; 25	WAK; 2 Ret	WAK; 3; 18	WIN; 1; 15	WIN; 2; 16	WIN; 3; 20	IPS; 1; 27	IPS; 2 Ret	IPS; 3; 22	OPK; 1; 14	OPK; 2; 18	OPK; 3 Ret	BAT; 1; 18	BAT; 2 Ret	PHI; 1 Ret	PHI; 2 DNS	40th	5
2008	Novocastrian Motorsport	Holden Commodore VZ	ADE; 1; 26	ADE; 2; 23	WAK; 1; 12	WAK; 2; 8	WAK; 3; 8	SAN; 1; 15	SAN; 2 Ret	SAN; 3; 17	IPS; 1; 15	IPS; 2 Ret	IPS; 3; 22	WIN; 1; 17	WIN; 2; 10	WIN; 3; 15	BAT; 1; 20	BAT; 2; 15	OPK; 1; 16	OPK; 2; 10	16th	739
2009	Novocastrian Motorsport	Ford Falcon BF	ADE; 1; 5	ADE; 2 Ret	WIN; 1; 7	WIN; 2; 5	WIN; 3; 12	TSV; 1	TSV; 2	TSV; 3	SAN; 1	SAN; 2	SAN; 3	IPS; 1	IPS; 2	IPS; 3	BAT; 1; 17	BAT; 2; 10	SOP; 1; 7	SOP; 2; 7	13th	619
2010	Novocastrian Motorsport	Ford Falcon BF	ADE; 1 Ret	ADE; 2; 6	IPS; 1; 11	IPS; 2; 6	IPS; 3; 9	WIN; 1 Ret	WIN; 2; 14	WIN; 3; 7	TSV; 1; 8	TSV; 2; 16	TSV; 3; 6	BAT; 1 Ret	BAT; 2; 11	SAN; 1; 9	SAN; 2; 9	SAN; 3; 19	SOP; 1 Ret	SOP; 2; 5	10th	850
2011	Novocastrian Motorsport	Ford Falcon BF	ADE; 1; 6	ADE; 2 Ret	PER; 1 Ret	PER; 2; 13	TSV; 1; 12	TSV; 2; 11	TSV; 3 Ret	IPS; 1 Ret	IPS; 2; 11	IPS; 3; 11	BAT; 1 DNS	BAT; 2; 11	SAN; 1; 12	SAN; 2 Ret	SAN; 3; 19	SOP; 1; 9	SOP; 2; 9		16th	670
2012	Novocastrian Motorsport	Ford Falcon BF	ADE; 1; 11	ADE; 2; 12	PER; 1; 15	PER; 2; 12	PER; 3; 9	TSV; 1; 15	TSV; 2; 10	TSV; 3; 7	IPS; 1; 16	IPS; 2; 14	IPS; 3; 13	BAT; 1; 8	BAT; 2; 12	WIN; 1; 13	WIN; 2; 5	WIN; 3; 9	SOP; 1; 9	SOP; 2 Ret	11th	971
2013	Novocastrian Motorsport	Ford Falcon FG	ADE; 1; 6	ADE; 2; 12	PER; 1; 13	PER; 2; 9	PER; 3; 12	TSV; 1; 7	TSV; 2 Ret	TSV; 3 Ret	IPS; 1; 9	IPS; 2; 2	IPS; 3; 12	WIN; 1; 7	WIN; 2; 2	WIN; 3; 7	BAT; 1; 7	BAT; 2; 5	SOP; 1; 11	SOP; 2; 10	7th	1138
2015	Novocastrian Motorsport	Ford Falcon FG	ADE; 1	ADE; 2	PER; 1	PER; 2	PER; 3	WIN; 1	WIN; 2	WIN; 3	TSV; 1	TSV; 2	IPS; 1	IPS; 2	IPS; 3	BAT; 20	SOP; 1	SOP; 2			34th	90
2016	STR Truck Bodies	Ford Falcon FG	ADE; 1	ADE; 2	PHI; 1	PHI; 2	PHI; 3	PER; 1	PER; 2	PER; 3	TSV; 1	TSV; 2	SAN; 1	SAN; 2	SAN; 3	BAT; 11	SOP; 1	SOP; 2			28th	144

=== Complete Bathurst 12 Hour results ===
Year	Team	Co-drivers	Car	Class	Laps	Pos.	Class pos.
2013	(Australia) Hunter Sports Group	(Australia) Steven Johnson (New Zealand) Jonny Reid	Porsche 997 GT3 Cup	B	257	9th	1st

=== Complete Supercars Championship results ===
V8 Supercar results
Year	Team	Car	1	2	3	4	5	6	7	8	9	10	11	12	13	14	15	16	17	18	19	20	21	22	23	24	25	26	27	28	29	30	31	32	33	34	35	36	Position	Points
2015	Novocastrian Motorsport	Holden VF Commodore	ADE; R1	ADE; R2	ADE; R3	SYM; R4	SYM; R5	SYM; R6	BAR; R7	BAR; R8	BAR; R9	WIN; R10	WIN; R11	WIN; R12	HID; R13	HID; R14	HID; R15	TOW; R16	TOW; R17	QLD; R18	QLD; R19	QLD; R20	SMP; R21	SMP; R22	SMP; R23	SAN; R24	BAT; R25; 17	SUR; R26	SUR; R27	PUK; R28	PUK; R29	PUK; R30	PHI; R31	PHI; R32	PHI; R33	SYD; R34	SYD; R35	SYD; R36	52nd	62

=== Complete Bathurst 1000 results ===
Year	Team	Car	Co-driver	Position	Laps
2015	Novocastrian Motorsport	Holden Commodore VF	(Australia) Aaren Russell	17th	161

=== Complete Bathurst 6 Hour results ===
Year	Team	Co-drivers	Car	Class	Laps	Pos.	Class pos.
2021	(Australia) Commodore Shop Cardiff	(Australia) James Herrington (Australia) Ryan Gilroy	Holden Commodore VE SS V	B2	112	29th	2nd
2022	(Australia) Novocastrian Motorsport	(Australia) Aaren Russell (Australia) Wayne Russell	BMW M3 F80	X	129	5th	4th
2023	(Australia) Novocastrian Motorsport	(Australia) Aaren Russell (Australia) Wayne Russell	BMW M3 F80	X	112	2nd	2nd
2026	(Australia) Randall Industries	(Australia) Lachlan Mineeff (Australia) Peter Lawrence	BMW M3 F92	B2	30	DNF	DNF
