= 2007 Fujitsu V8 Supercar Series =

2007 Australian V8 motorcar race

The 2007 Fujitsu V8 Supercars Series was an Australian motor racing competition for V8 Supercars. It began on 1 March at the Adelaide Parklands Circuit and ended on 2 December at Phillip Island after seven rounds. The series was the eighth annual V8 Supercar Development Series.

The series was won by Tony D'Alberto driving a Holden VZ Commodore.

== Race calendar ==
The series consisted of six rounds supporting the 2007 V8 Supercar Championship Series and one stand-alone round.

Rd.	Event	Circuit	Location	Date	Winner	Car
1	(Australia) Clipsal 500	Adelaide Street Circuit	Adelaide, South Australia	1–4 Mar	Michael Caruso	Ford BA Falcon
2	(Australia) Wakefield Park	Wakefield Park	Goulburn, New South Wales	30 Mar – 1 Apr	Tony D'Alberto	Holden VZ Commodore
3	(Australia) Winton	Winton Motor Raceway	Benalla, Victoria	18–20 May	Tony D'Alberto	Holden VZ Commodore
4	(Australia) Queensland 300	Queensland Raceway	Ipswich, Queensland	20–22 Jul	Michael Caruso	Ford BA Falcon
5	(Australia) Jim Beam 400	Oran Park Raceway	Sydney, New South Wales	17–19 Aug	Owen Kelly	Ford BA Falcon
6	(Australia) Supercheap Auto Bathurst 1000	Mount Panorama Circuit	Bathurst, New South Wales	4–7 Oct	Luke Youlden	Ford BA Falcon
7	(Australia) Dunlop Grand Final	Phillip Island Grand Prix Circuit	Phillip Island, Victoria	30 Nov – 2 Dec	Michael Caruso	Ford BA Falcon

== Teams and drivers ==
The following teams and drivers have competed during the 2007 Fujitsu V8 Supercar Series. This was the last year in which the Holden VX Commodore was eligible to compete in the series.

Team	Vehicle	No.	Driver	Rounds
Sieders Racing Team	Ford AU Falcon	13	(Australia) Colin Sieders	1–6
Sieders Racing Team	Ford BA Falcon	19	(Australia) David Sieders	1–6
Stones Motorsport	Holden VX Commodore	24	(Australia) Nigel Stones	3, 5–6
Team Dynamik	Holden VZ Commodore	28	(New Zealand) Simon Wills	1
MW Motorsport	Ford BA Falcon	28	(Australia) Marcus Marshall	2, 4
MW Motorsport	Ford BA Falcon	28	(Australia) Matthew White	3, 6
MW Motorsport	Ford BA Falcon	28	(New Zealand) John McIntyre	5
MW Motorsport	Ford BA Falcon	28	(Australia) Geoff Emery	7
MW Motorsport	Ford BA Falcon	29	(Australia) Tim Slade	3–6
MW Motorsport	Ford BA Falcon	29	(Australia) Grant Denyer	7
Prodigy Motorsport	Ford BA Falcon	29	(Australia) Clayton Pyne	1
Prodigy Motorsport	Ford BA Falcon	60	(Australia) José Fernández	2–7
Prodigy Motorsport	Ford BA Falcon	96	(Australia) José Fernández	1
Prodigy Motorsport	Ford BA Falcon	61	(Australia) Tom Drewer	2
Prodigy Motorsport	Ford BA Falcon	61	(New Zealand) Gene Rollinson	3
Prodigy Motorsport	Ford BA Falcon	61	(New Zealand) John McIntyre	4
Prodigy Motorsport	Ford BA Falcon	61	(Australia) Damian Assaillit	5–7
A.N.T. Racing	Ford BA Falcon	30	(Australia) Tim Slade	1–2
A.N.T. Racing	Ford BA Falcon	30	(Australia) Luke Youlden	7
HPM Racing	Ford AU Falcon	30	(Australia) Ryan Brown	6
HPM Racing	Ford AU Falcon	75	(Australia) Aaron McGill	All
HPM Racing	Ford AU Falcon	76	(Australia) Luke Youlden	1–3
HPM Racing	Ford BA Falcon	76	(Australia) Luke Youlden	4–6
HPM Racing	Ford BA Falcon	76	(Australia) Phillip Scifleet	7
Partington Race Prep	Ford AU Falcon	31	(Australia) Damian Assaillit	1–4
Howard Racing	Ford BA Falcon	32	(United Kingdom) Adam Sharpe	All
Howard Racing	Ford BA Falcon	37	(Australia) Mark Howard	All
Howard Racing	Ford BA Falcon	71	(Australia) Andrew Thompson	1–5
Howard Racing	Ford BA Falcon	71	(Australia) Shannon O'Brien	7
Peters Motorsport	Ford AU Falcon	40	(Australia) Neil McFadyen	1–2
Peters Motorsport	Ford AU Falcon	40	(Australia) Wayne Wakefield	3–5
Peters Motorsport	Ford AU Falcon	80	(Australia) Barry Tanton	1–5
Peters Motorsport	Ford BA Falcon	91	(Australia) Gary Deane	1–4
Peters Motorsport	Ford BA Falcon	91	(Australia) Joel Spychala	7
Voight Contracting	Ford AU Falcon	41	(Australia) Stephen Voight	4
Jay Motorsport	Holden VZ Commodore	42	(Australia) Jay Verdnik	All
Jack Hillerman Racing	Holden VZ Commodore	43	(Australia) Chris Alajajian	2–6
Kanga Loaders Racing	Holden VY Commodore	44	(New Zealand) Chris Pither	4–7
O’Brien Motorsport	Ford BA Falcon	45	(Australia) Shannon O'Brien	1-6
Greg Murphy Racing	Holden VZ Commodore	46	(Australia) Dale Wood	All
Greg Murphy Racing	Holden VZ Commodore	47	(Australia) Sam Walter	All
Image Racing	Ford AU Falcon	48	(Australia) Dean Neville	1–2, 4–6
Image Racing	Ford AU Falcon	49	(Australia) Terry Wyhoon	2–3, 6–7
Image Racing	Ford BA Falcon	49	(Australia) Owen Kelly	4–5
Novocastrian Motorsport	Holden VX Commodore	58	(Australia) Drew Russell	2-7
Scott Loadsman Racing	Holden VY Commodore	62	(Australia) Scott Loadsman	1–2
Scott Loadsman Racing	Holden VZ Commodore	62	(Australia) Scott Loadsman	3–7
Shane Beikoff Racing	Ford AU Falcon	68	(Australia) Shane Beikoff	1, 3, 5, 7
Shane Beikoff Racing	Ford AU Falcon	68	(Australia) Jonathan Beikoff	2, 4, 6
CarTrek Racing	Holden VX Commodore	69	(Australia) Robert Jones	3–4, 6–7
Action Racing	Holden VZ Commodore	73	(Australia) Marcus Zukanovic	All
Tony D'Alberto Racing	Holden VZ Commodore	74	(Australia) Mark McNally	1–5
Tony D'Alberto Racing	Holden VZ Commodore	99	(Australia) Tony D'Alberto	All
Ford Rising Stars Racing	Ford BA Falcon	77	(Australia) Daniel Elliott	1, 3
Ford Rising Stars Racing	Ford BA Falcon	77	(Australia) Grant Denyer	2, 4–6
Ford Rising Stars Racing	Ford BA Falcon	777	(Australia) Michael Caruso	All
Wollongong Performance Racing	Holden VZ Commodore	85	(Australia) Damien White	All
Wollongong Performance Racing	Holden VZ Commodore	100	(New Zealand) Kayne Scott	All
Stone Brothers Racing	Ford BA Falcon	94	(Australia) Jonathon Webb	All
Sydney Star Racing	Holden VY Commodore	95	(Australia) Adam Wallis	1
Sydney Star Racing	Holden VY Commodore	95	(Australia) Taz Douglas	2
Sydney Star Racing	Holden VY Commodore	95	(Australia) Ashley Cooper	3–5
Sydney Star Racing	Holden VY Commodore	95	(Australia) Ash Samadi	7
Sydney Star Racing	Holden VZ Commodore	96	(New Zealand) Chris Pither	3
Sydney Star Racing	Holden VZ Commodore	96	(Australia) Mark McNally	6–7
Sydney Star Racing	Holden VZ Commodore	98	(Australia) Brett Hobson	All

== Series standings ==
Pos	Driver	ADE		WAK			WIN			QLD			ORA			BAT		PHI		Pts
1	Tony D'Alberto	2	2	2	2	1	2	3	2	3	5	3	1	DSQ	DSQ	Ret	6	9	5	303
2	Michael Caruso	1	1	15	7	6	Ret	6	5	1	7	1	24	6	14	2	22	1	1	298
3	Kayne Scott	Ret	6	5	9	12	3	5	3	5	1	2	6	5	22	3	16	2	2	259
4	Jonathon Webb	3	5	8	1	9	24	12	Ret	13	8	4	4	3	4	Ret	10	3	Ret	206
5	Luke Youlden	Ret	DNS	20	19	Ret	7	1	14	4	3	10	5	4	15	1	1	6	20	198
6	Damien White	5	3	18	8	8	Ret	8	22	23	14	27	8	2	3	8	DNS	5	3	185
7	Dale Wood	4	10	14	DSQ	Ret	19	10	24	16	11	8	2	10	13	4	2	4	9	180
8	José Fernández	8	12	3	5	3	Ret	Ret	Ret	7	9	Ret	Ret	28	6	6	3	11	12	162
9	Tim Slade	10	7	12	13	Ret	8	23	11	9	2	7	Ret	20	7	9	4			139
10	Marcus Zukanovic	18	DSQ	11	4	19	9	2	4	22	Ret	13	23	13	Ret	7	5	17	6	127
11	Andrew Thompson	Ret	4	Ret	12	5	1	26	1	30	Ret	14	3	23	9					117
12	Shannon O'Brien	19	Ret	26	15	14	Ret	15	6	2	6	18	9	8	2	DNS	11	15	19	102
13	Jay Verdnik	17	8	7	Ret	4	Ret	22	Ret	14	DNS	17	Ret	19	19	11	7	18	8	84
14	Chris Pither						6	27	15	20	12	12	10	12	Ret	14	Ret	7	4	80
15	Marcus Marshall			4	3	2				6	4	Ret								79
16	Brett Hobson	Ret	9	6	10	24	23	14	13	34	19	16	Ret	24	11	17	Ret	8	7	77
17	David Sieders	Ret	Ret	16	25	11	DNS	DNS	DNS	17	10	5	7	11	8	13	8			75
18	Sam Walter	16	13	9	6	7	22	18	Ret	26	16	Ret	13	Ret	10	Ret	12	10	Ret	70
19	Adam Sharpe	9	16	13	26	15	5	20	12	8	22	9	Ret	14	20	15	Ret	14	Ret	67
20	Damian Assaillit	14	19	28	21	Ret	Ret	19	21	15	13	Ret	16	9	5	Ret	9	23	10	58
21	Matthew White						4	9	9							5	Ret			53
22	Mark McNally	Ret	11	10	14	10	DSQ	21	10	28	18	Ret	11	27	16	Ret	DNS	Ret	11	51
23	Owen Kelly									DNS	DNS	DNS	25	1	1					48
24	Robert Jones						10	4	7	25	21	21				Ret	18	13	22	40
25	Terry Wyhoon			21	11	17	11	7	Ret							12	23	Ret	Ret	31
26	Scott Loadsman	7	20	19	18	Ret	20	31	Ret	19	Ret	25	Ret	22	23	20	19	12	13	30
27	John McIntyre									10	30	6	12	Ret	Ret					26
28	Grant Denyer			17	22	16				Ret	28	20	Ret	17	12	10	13	Ret	18	23
29	Gene Rollinson						14	11	8											19
30	Mark Howard	12	Ret	22	Ret	20	13	Ret	16	12	27	15	17	16	21	19	Ret	22	21	19
31	Colin Sieders	15	18	23	16	21	12	30	18	11	26	23	18	21	18	23	14			19
32	Adam Wallis	6	Ret																	18
33	Wayne Wakefield						Ret	25	Ret	21	17	11	19	7	Ret					17
34	Chris Alajajian			1	Ret	Ret	Ret	17	19	Ret	Ret	DNS	Ret	15	17	Ret	DNS			16 *
35	Neil McFadyen	11	Ret	Ret	24	13														13
36	Clayton Pyne	13	15																	9
37	Aaron McGill	DNS	17	Ret	20	23	18	13	17	Ret	24	24	15	Ret	Ret	21	17	19	16	6
38	Joel Spychala																	20	14	5
39	Daniel Elliot	Ret	14				21	24	Ret											5
40	Drew Russell			25	Ret	18	15	16	20	27	Ret	22	14	18	Ret	18	Ret	Ret	DNS	5
41	Shane Beikoff	Ret	22				Ret	29	23				20	26	25			21	15	3
42	Jonathan Beikoff			27	Ret	Ret				32	25	26				16	15			3
43	Ashley Cooper						DNS	DNS	DNS	18	15	Ret	Ret	30	Ret					2
	Gary Deane	Ret	Ret	31	27	25	16	28	Ret	29	23	Ret								0
	Dean Neville	Ret	Ret	32	Ret	DNS				31	31	28	22	25	Ret	Ret	Ret			0
	Barry Tanton	DNS	DNS	30	28	22	17	32	25	33	29	Ret	DNQ	DNQ	DNQ					0
	Simon Wills	Ret	21																	0
	Taz Douglas			29	23	Ret														0
	Tom Drewer			24	17	Ret														0
	Nigel Stones						DNS	DNS	DNS				21	29	24	Ret	21			0
	Stephen Voight									24	20	19								0
	Ryan Brown															22	20			0
	Geoff Emery																	16	Ret	0
	Phillip Scifleet																	Ret	17	0
	Ash Samadi																	Ret	Ret	0

Colour	Result
Gold	Winner
Silver	Second place
Bronze	Third place
Green	Points classification
Blue	Non-points classification
Blue	Non-classified finish (NC)
Purple	Retired, not classified (Ret)
Red	Did not qualify (DNQ)
Red	Did not pre-qualify (DNPQ)
Black	Disqualified (DSQ)
White	Did not start (DNS)
White	Withdrew (WD)
White	Race cancelled (C)
Blank	Did not practice (DNP)
Blank	Did not arrive (DNA)
Blank	Excluded (EX)

Note: Chris Alajajian scored 26 points during the series but was penalized 10 points, leaving a final total of 16.
