= 2015 International V8 Supercars Championship =

Motor racing competition

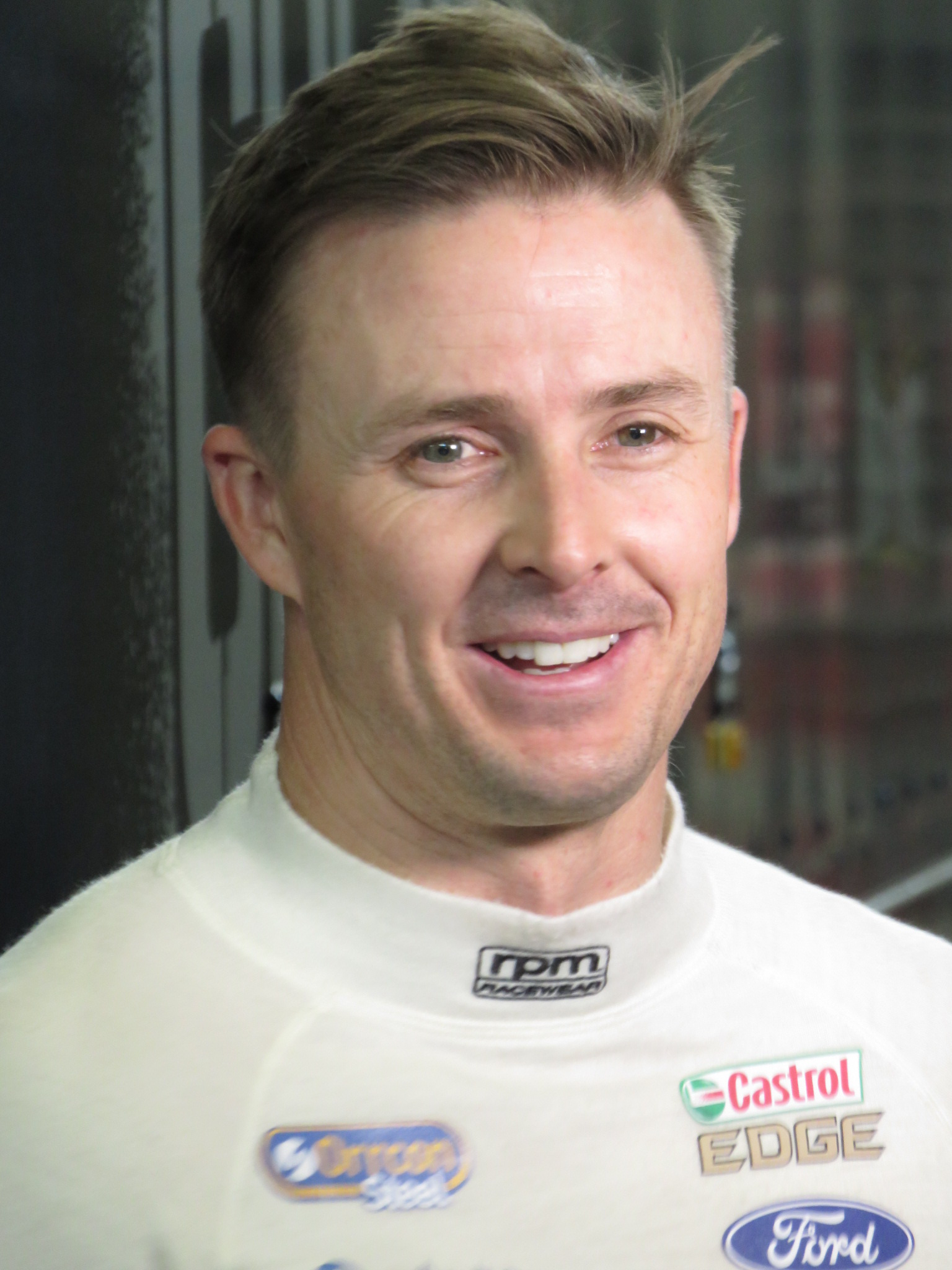
Mark Winterbottom won his first drivers' championship.

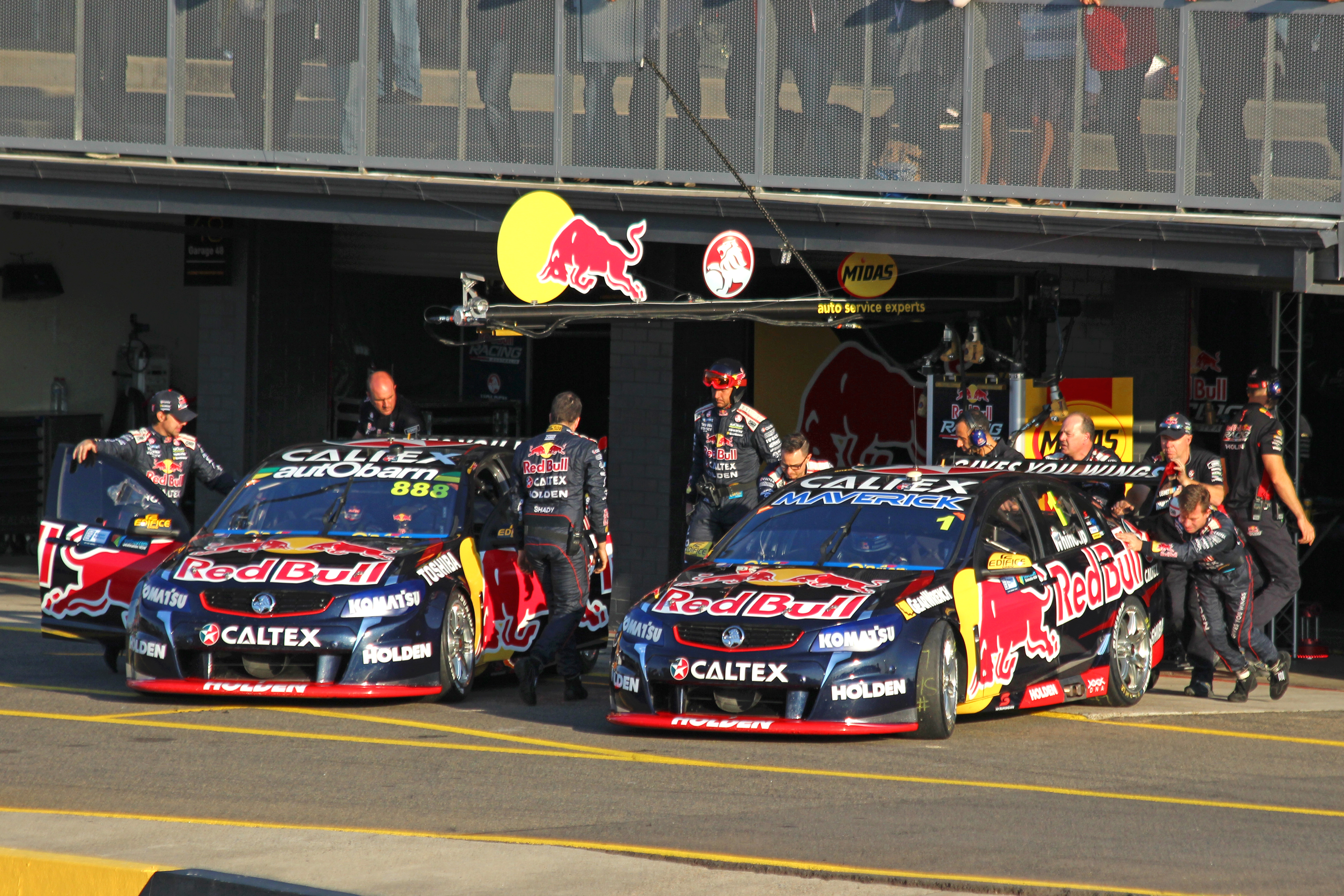
Triple Eight Race Engineering won its sixth consecutive teams' championship.

The 2015 International V8 Supercars Championship (often simplified to the 2015 V8 Supercars Championship) was an FIA-sanctioned international auto racing series for V8 Supercars. It was the seventeenth running of the V8 Supercar Championship Series and the nineteenth series in which V8 Supercars have contested the premier Australian touring car title.

Mark Winterbottom of Prodrive Racing Australia secured his first championship title with one race remaining, winning nine races during the season, while Triple Eight Race Engineering won the Teams' Championship. The Enduro Cup was won by Garth Tander and Warren Luff, driving for the Holden Racing Team.

== Teams and drivers ==
Holden, Nissan and Volvo were all represented by factory-backed teams. Ford reduced its commitment as a prelude to a complete exit from the series at the end of the season, while Mercedes-Benz continued to be represented without any factory support.

The following teams and drivers competed in the 2015 championship.

Championship entries						Endurance entries	
Manufacturer	Model	Team	No.	Driver name	Rounds	Co-driver name	Rounds
Ford	Falcon FG	Rod Nash Racing (PRA)	55	(Australia) David Reynolds	1	—N/a	
Ford	Falcon FG	Super Black Racing (PRA)	111	(New Zealand) Andre Heimgartner	1	—N/a	
Ford	Falcon FG X	Prodrive Racing Australia	5	(Australia) Mark Winterbottom	All	(Australia) Steve Owen	9–11
Ford	Falcon FG X	Prodrive Racing Australia	6	(Australia) Chaz Mostert	1–10	(Australia) Cam Waters	9–10
Ford	Falcon FG X	Prodrive Racing Australia	6	(Australia) Cam Waters	11–13	(Australia) Russell Ingall	11
Ford	Falcon FG X	Prodrive Racing Australia	6	(Australia) Steve Owen	14	—N/a	
Ford	Falcon FG X	DJR Team Penske	17	(Australia) Marcos Ambrose	1	—N/a	
Ford	Falcon FG X	DJR Team Penske	17	(Australia) Scott Pye	2–14	(Australia) Marcos Ambrose	9–11
Ford	Falcon FG X	Rod Nash Racing (PRA)	55	(Australia) David Reynolds	2–14	(Australia) Dean Canto	9–11
Ford	Falcon FG X	Super Black Racing (PRA)	111	(New Zealand) Andre Heimgartner	2–12	(New Zealand) Ant Pedersen	9–11
Ford	Falcon FG X	Super Black Racing (PRA)	111	(New Zealand) Chris Pither	13–14	—N/a	
Holden	Commodore VF	Triple Eight Race Engineering	1	(Australia) Jamie Whincup	All	(Australia) Paul Dumbrell	9–11
Holden	Commodore VF	Triple Eight Race Engineering	888	(Australia) Craig Lowndes	All	(New Zealand) Steven Richards	9–11
Holden	Commodore VF	Holden Racing Team	2	(Australia) Garth Tander	All	(Australia) Warren Luff	9–11
Holden	Commodore VF	Holden Racing Team	22	(Australia) James Courtney	1–7, 11–14	(Australia) Jack Perkins	11
Holden	Commodore VF	Holden Racing Team	22	(Australia) Jack Perkins	8–10	(Australia) Russell Ingall	9–10
Holden	Commodore VF	Lucas Dumbrell Motorsport	3	(Australia) Tim Blanchard	All	(Australia) Karl Reindler	9–11
Holden	Commodore VF	Lucas Dumbrell Motorsport	222	(Australia) Nick Percat	1–12	(United Kingdom) Oliver Gavin	9–11
Holden	Commodore VF	Lucas Dumbrell Motorsport	222	(Australia) Paul Dumbrell	13	—N/a	
Holden	Commodore VF	Lucas Dumbrell Motorsport	222	(Australia) Jack Perkins	14	—N/a	
Holden	Commodore VF	Brad Jones Racing	8	(Australia) Jason Bright	All	(Australia) Andrew Jones	9–11
Holden	Commodore VF	Brad Jones Racing	14	(New Zealand) Fabian Coulthard	All	(Australia) Luke Youlden	9–11
Holden	Commodore VF	Charlie Schwerkolt Racing (HRT)	18	(Australia) Lee Holdsworth	All	(France) Sébastien Bourdais	9–11
Holden	Commodore VF	Britek Motorsport (BJR)	21	(Australia) Dale Wood	All	(Australia) Macauley Jones	9–11
Holden	Commodore VF	Walkinshaw Racing (HRT)	47	(Australia) Tim Slade	All	(Australia) Tony D'Alberto	9–11
Holden	Commodore VF	Tekno Autosports	97	(New Zealand) Shane van Gisbergen	All	(Australia) Jonathon Webb	9–11
Mercedes-Benz	E63 AMG	Erebus Motorsport	4	(Australia) Ashley Walsh	1–12	(Australia) Jack Le Brocq	9–11
Mercedes-Benz	E63 AMG	Erebus Motorsport	4	(Australia) Dean Canto	13	—N/a	
Mercedes-Benz	E63 AMG	Erebus Motorsport	4	(Australia) Alex Davison	14	—N/a	
Mercedes-Benz	E63 AMG	Erebus Motorsport	9	(Australia) Will Davison	All	(Australia) Alex Davison	9–11
Nissan	Altima L33	Nissan Motorsport	7	(Australia) Todd Kelly	All	(United Kingdom) Alex Buncombe	9–11
Nissan	Altima L33	Nissan Motorsport	15	(Australia) Rick Kelly	All	(Australia) David Russell	9–11
Nissan	Altima L33	Nissan Motorsport	23	(Australia) Michael Caruso	All	(Australia) Dean Fiore	9–11
Nissan	Altima L33	Nissan Motorsport	99	(Australia) James Moffat	All	(Australia) Taz Douglas	9–11
Volvo	S60	Garry Rogers Motorsport	33	(New Zealand) Scott McLaughlin	All	(France) Alexandre Prémat	9–11
Volvo	S60	Garry Rogers Motorsport	34	(Australia) David Wall	All	(New Zealand) Chris Pither	9–11
Wildcard entries
Ford	Falcon FG X	Prodrive Racing Australia	200	—N/a		(Australia) Renee Gracie (Switzerland) Simona de Silvestro	10
Holden	Commodore VF	Novocastrian Motorsport	62	—N/a		(Australia) Aaren Russell (Australia) Drew Russell	10

=== Team changes ===
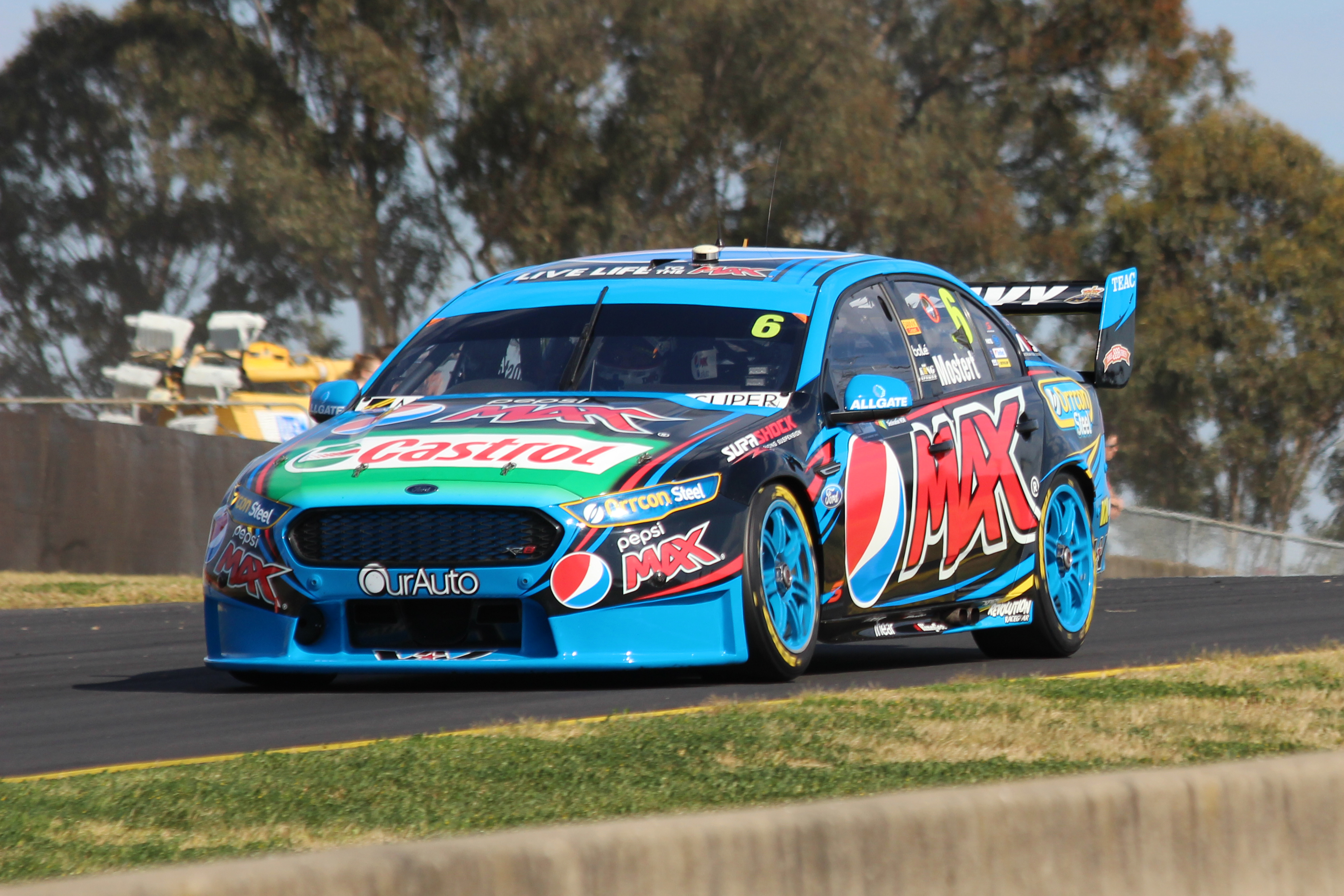
Ford teams updated to the new FG X Falcon.

Teams competing with the Ford Falcon updated to the new Falcon FG X, though Rod Nash Racing and Super Black Racing started the season with the previous FG configuration. Both teams updated to the FG X for the second event of the championship.

Ford Performance Racing was rebranded as Prodrive Racing Australia, following Ford reducing its funding to the team.

Charlie Schwerkolt Racing switched from racing a customer Ford Performance Racing Falcon to a customer Holden Racing Team Commodore.

Dick Johnson Racing was rebranded as DJR Team Penske, after Team Penske purchased a 51% stake in the team. The team scaled back to run a single car.

James Rosenberg Racing returned its Racing Entitlement Contract (REC) to the series' management.

Lucas Dumbrell Motorsport returned to fielding two cars having scaled back to run a single car in 2014.

Super Black Racing entered the series full-time as a customer of Prodrive Racing Australia with a REC leased from DJR Team Penske.

=== Driver changes ===
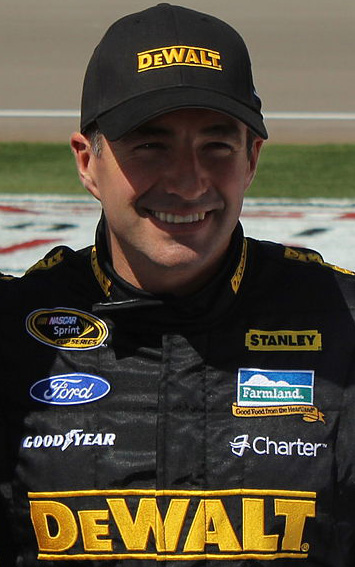
Marcos Ambrose was scheduled to return to the series full-time, but stepped down after the first event. He returned as a co-driver in the endurance races.

After making a one-off appearance at the 2014 Sydney NRMA 500 for Dick Johnson Racing, former series champion Marcos Ambrose returned to the championship on a full-time basis. With the team scaling back to run a single car for Ambrose, Scott Pye was left without a drive.

Tim Blanchard joined Lucas Dumbrell Motorsport full-time after driving for the team in the endurance races in 2014.

Andre Heimgartner competed in his first full-time season, driving for Super Black Racing, after racing in a wildcard entry in the 2014 Supercheap Auto Bathurst 1000.

Lee Holdsworth moved from Erebus Motorsport to Charlie Schwerkolt Racing, replacing Jack Perkins. Holdsworth's place at Erebus Motorsport was taken by Ashley Walsh.

Nick Percat moved from James Rosenberg Racing to Lucas Dumbrell Motorsport following Russell Ingall's retirement from full-time driving.

David Wall moved from Dick Johnson Racing to Garry Rogers Motorsport to replace Robert Dahlgren.

=== Mid-season changes ===
Marcos Ambrose stepped down from full-time driving duties at DJR Team Penske prior to the second event of the championship. He was replaced by Scott Pye, who had originally been listed as the team's endurance co-driver, for the rest of the season. Ambrose returned as a co-driver for the endurance races.

James Courtney was injured during practice for the Sydney Motorsport Park Super Sprint when he was hit by pieces of pit equipment which were flung into the air by a low-flying helicopter. His endurance co-driver, Jack Perkins, replaced him for the remainder of the weekend. Courtney also missed the Wilson Security Sandown 500 and Supercheap Auto Bathurst 1000, with Russell Ingall coming out of retirement to be co-driver for Perkins.

Cam Waters made his full-time V8 Supercar début, replacing Chaz Mostert at Prodrive Racing Australia after Mostert was injured in an accident at the Bathurst 1000. As Waters was originally scheduled to partner Mostert for the Gold Coast 600, Russell Ingall was drafted in as co-driver ahead of James Courtney's return to the Holden Racing Team. Steve Owen drove the car at the Sydney 500 to allow Waters to concentrate on his Dunlop Series commitments.

Dean Canto replaced Ashley Walsh at the Phillip Island event, with Erebus Motorsport citing the need for an experienced driver to help with car setup. Alex Davison drove the car at the Sydney 500 as Erebus Motorsport continues its development program.

Chris Pither replaced Andre Heimgartner at the Phillip Island event as Super Black Racing evaluated its full-time driver options for 2016. Pither also drove at the Sydney 500, having been confirmed as Heimgartner's replacement for 2016.

After taking part in Friday practice at the Phillip Island event, Nick Percat elected not to take part in the rest of the weekend due to a foot injury sustained at the Gold Coast 600. He was replaced by Paul Dumbrell for the rest of the event. Percat did not recover in time for the Sydney 500 and was replaced by Jack Perkins for the event.

=== Wildcard entries ===
Two wildcard entries would be granted for the Bathurst 1000. Prodrive Racing Australia elected to run an all-female wildcard for Renee Gracie and Simona De Silvestro, while family team Novocastrian Motorsport ran a Commodore for brothers Aaren Russell and Drew Russell.

== Calendar ==
The 2015 calendar was released on 12 September 2014. Two non-championship events were held; one being the V8 Supercars Challenge in conjunction with the Australian Grand Prix on 12–15 March, and the other a demonstration using five cars (one from each manufacturer) at the Kuala Lumpur City Grand Prix in Malaysia over 7–9 August.

Rnd.	Event name	Circuit	Location	Format	Date
1	(South Australia) Adelaide 500	Adelaide Street Circuit	Adelaide, South Australia	ST	28 February – 1 March
2	Tasmania SuperSprint	Symmons Plains Raceway	Launceston, Tasmania	SP	28–29 March
3	(Western Australia) Perth SuperSprint	Barbagallo Raceway	Perth, Western Australia	SP	2–3 May
4	(Victoria (state)) Winton SuperSprint	Winton Motor Raceway	Benalla, Victoria	SP	16–17 May
5	(Northern Territory) Darwin Triple Crown	Hidden Valley Raceway	Darwin, Northern Territory	SP	20–21 June
6	(Queensland) Townsville 400	Reid Park Street Circuit	Townsville, Queensland	ST	11–12 July
7	(Queensland) Ipswich SuperSprint	Queensland Raceway	Ipswich, Queensland	SP	1–2 August
8	(New South Wales) Sydney Motorsport Park SuperSprint	Sydney Motorsport Park	Eastern Creek, New South Wales	SP	22–23 August
9	(Victoria (state)) Sandown 500	Sandown Raceway	Melbourne, Victoria	EC	13 September
10	(New South Wales) Bathurst 1000	Mount Panorama Circuit	Bathurst, New South Wales	EC	11 October
11	(Queensland) Gold Coast 600	Surfers Paradise Street Circuit	Surfers Paradise, Queensland	EC	24–25 October
12	(New Zealand) Auckland 500	Pukekohe Park Raceway	Pukekohe, New Zealand	SP	6–8 November
13	(Victoria (state)) Phillip Island SuperSprint	Phillip Island Grand Prix Circuit	Phillip Island, Victoria	SP	21–22 November
14	(New South Wales) Sydney 500	Homebush Street Circuit	Sydney, New South Wales	ST	5–6 December

Icon	Meaning
ST	Super Street
SP	Super Sprint
EC	Endurance Cup

Australian rounds
New Zealand rounds

=== Calendar changes ===
The Auckland event moved from April to November, while the Winton and Perth events swapped positions on the calendar.

=== Format changes ===
Each Super Sprint event featured two hours of Friday practice which incorporated testing time for the teams. The Townsville event reverted to its original 400-kilometre format, with a 200-kilometre race held on both Saturday and Sunday. The Saturday races of Super Sprint events were contested over a shorter distance of 60 kilometres per race, compared to the 100-kilometre races held in 2014. No twilight races were held. After holding a fourth race on the Friday in 2013 and 2014, the Auckland event was reduced to three races, the same as all other Super Sprint events.

== Rule changes ==
The number of test days allocated to each team was reduced from four to three. A compulsory two-day test was held at Sydney Motorsport Park on 7–8 February 2015, with teams allocated one further day of private testing that could be used at their discretion. The amount of track time on Fridays at eight rounds has been increased to account for the reduced number of test days.

From Darwin, in response to processional racing in the 60 km SuperSprint races, the V8 Supercar Commission changed tyre allocations to give teams a set of soft compound rubber for the second race.

== Other changes ==
The season saw the commencement of a new television deal, with Foxtel and Network Ten taking over the broadcasting rights from Seven Network. All races are being shown live on Foxtel's Fox Sports with six events – Adelaide, Townsville, Sandown, Bathurst, the Gold Coast and Sydney – also being televised live on Ten. Ten also broadcasts limited highlights of the other events. The television series Inside Supercars and Supercars Life were also launched by Fox Sports to accompany their coverage. Ten revived their motorsport magazine series RPM to accompany their own coverage.

== Results and standings ==
=== Season summary ===
Round	Race	Event	Pole position	Fastest lap	Winning driver	Winning team	Report
1	1	Adelaide 500	(Australia) Jamie Whincup	(Australia) Jamie Whincup	(Australia) Jamie Whincup	Triple Eight Race Engineering	Report
1	2	Adelaide 500	(Australia) Jamie Whincup	(Australia) Tim Slade	(New Zealand) Fabian Coulthard	Brad Jones Racing	Report
1	3	Adelaide 500	(Australia) James Courtney	(Australia) Garth Tander	(Australia) James Courtney	Holden Racing Team	Report
2	4	Tasmania SuperSprint	(Australia) Craig Lowndes	(New Zealand) Shane van Gisbergen	(Australia) Craig Lowndes	Triple Eight Race Engineering	Report
2	5	Tasmania SuperSprint	(Australia) Craig Lowndes	(Australia) Craig Lowndes	(Australia) Craig Lowndes	Triple Eight Race Engineering	Report
2	6	Tasmania SuperSprint	(Australia) Craig Lowndes	(Australia) Craig Lowndes	(Australia) Jamie Whincup	Triple Eight Race Engineering	Report
3	7	Perth SuperSprint	(Australia) Chaz Mostert	(Australia) Chaz Mostert	(Australia) Mark Winterbottom	Prodrive Racing Australia	Report
3	8	Perth SuperSprint	(Australia) Mark Winterbottom	(Australia) Mark Winterbottom	(Australia) Mark Winterbottom	Prodrive Racing Australia	Report
3	9	Perth SuperSprint	(Australia) Chaz Mostert	(Australia) Rick Kelly	(Australia) Will Davison	Erebus Motorsport	Report
4	10	Winton SuperSprint	(Australia) Chaz Mostert	(Australia) Chaz Mostert	(Australia) Chaz Mostert	Prodrive Racing Australia	Report
4	11	Winton SuperSprint	(Australia) Chaz Mostert	(Australia) David Reynolds	(Australia) Mark Winterbottom	Prodrive Racing Australia	Report
4	12	Winton SuperSprint	(Australia) Chaz Mostert	(Australia) Rick Kelly	(Australia) Mark Winterbottom	Prodrive Racing Australia	Report
5	13	Darwin Triple Crown	(Australia) James Courtney	(New Zealand) Shane van Gisbergen	(Australia) Chaz Mostert	Prodrive Racing Australia	Report
5	14	Darwin Triple Crown	(Australia) Rick Kelly	(New Zealand) Shane van Gisbergen	(Australia) Craig Lowndes	Triple Eight Race Engineering	Report
5	15	Darwin Triple Crown	(Australia) David Reynolds	(Australia) Rick Kelly	(Australia) David Reynolds	Rod Nash Racing	Report
6	16	Townsville 400	(Australia) Chaz Mostert	(Australia) Mark Winterbottom	(Australia) Mark Winterbottom	Prodrive Racing Australia	Report
6	17	Townsville 400	(New Zealand) Scott McLaughlin	(Australia) Mark Winterbottom	(Australia) Mark Winterbottom	Prodrive Racing Australia	Report
7	18	Ipswich SuperSprint	(Australia) Chaz Mostert	(Australia) Mark Winterbottom	(Australia) Mark Winterbottom	Prodrive Racing Australia	Report
7	19	Ipswich SuperSprint	(Australia) Craig Lowndes	(Australia) Craig Lowndes	(Australia) Mark Winterbottom	Prodrive Racing Australia	Report
7	20	Ipswich SuperSprint	(Australia) Chaz Mostert	(Australia) Chaz Mostert	(Australia) Chaz Mostert	Prodrive Racing Australia	Report
8	21	Sydney Motorsport Park SuperSprint	(Australia) Chaz Mostert	(Australia) Chaz Mostert	(Australia) Chaz Mostert	Prodrive Racing Australia	Report
8	22	Sydney Motorsport Park SuperSprint	(Australia) Chaz Mostert	(Australia) Scott Pye	(Australia) Jamie Whincup	Triple Eight Race Engineering	Report
8	23	Sydney Motorsport Park SuperSprint	(New Zealand) Scott McLaughlin	(Australia) Craig Lowndes	(Australia) Chaz Mostert	Prodrive Racing Australia	Report
9	24	Sandown 500	(Australia) Jamie Whincup (Australia) Paul Dumbrell	(Australia) Paul Dumbrell	(Australia) Mark Winterbottom (Australia) Steve Owen	Prodrive Racing Australia	Report
10	25	Bathurst 1000	(Australia) David Reynolds	(Australia) Jamie Whincup	(Australia) Craig Lowndes (New Zealand) Steven Richards	Triple Eight Race Engineering	Report
11	26	Gold Coast 600	(New Zealand) Shane van Gisbergen	(New Zealand) Shane van Gisbergen	(New Zealand) Shane van Gisbergen (Australia) Jonathon Webb	Tekno Autosports	Report
11	27	Gold Coast 600	(New Zealand) Scott McLaughlin	(Australia) Craig Lowndes	(Australia) James Courtney (Australia) Jack Perkins	Holden Racing Team	Report
12	28	Auckland 500	(Australia) Jamie Whincup	(Australia) Jamie Whincup	(Australia) Jamie Whincup	Triple Eight Race Engineering	Report
12	29	Auckland 500	(Australia) David Reynolds	(Australia) Craig Lowndes	(Australia) David Reynolds	Rod Nash Racing	Report
12	30	Auckland 500	(New Zealand) Scott McLaughlin	(Australia) Jamie Whincup	(Australia) Jamie Whincup	Triple Eight Race Engineering	Report
13	31	Phillip Island SuperSprint	(Australia) Jamie Whincup	(Australia) Craig Lowndes	(Australia) Craig Lowndes	Triple Eight Race Engineering	Report
13	32	Phillip Island SuperSprint	(New Zealand) Scott McLaughlin	(Australia) Jamie Whincup	(Australia) Jamie Whincup	Triple Eight Race Engineering	Report
13	33	Phillip Island SuperSprint	(Australia) Mark Winterbottom	(Australia) Scott Pye	(Australia) Craig Lowndes	Triple Eight Race Engineering	Report
14	34	Sydney 500	(Australia) Mark Winterbottom	(New Zealand) Shane van Gisbergen	(Australia) Jamie Whincup	Triple Eight Race Engineering	Report
14	35	Sydney 500	(Australia) Jamie Whincup	(New Zealand) Shane van Gisbergen	(Australia) Jamie Whincup	Triple Eight Race Engineering	Report
14	36	Sydney 500	(Australia) James Courtney	(Australia) Jamie Whincup	(New Zealand) Shane van Gisbergen	Tekno Autosports	Report

=== Points system ===
Points were awarded for each race at an event, to the driver/s of a car that completed at least 75% of the race distance and was running at the completion of the race, up to a maximum of 300 points per event.

Points format	Position																										
Points format	1st	2nd	3rd	4th	5th	6th	7th	8th	9th	10th	11th	12th	13th	14th	15th	16th	17th	18th	19th	20th	21st	22nd	23rd	24th	25th	26th	27th
Short format	75	69	64	60	55	51	48	45	42	39	36	34	33	31	30	28	27	25	24	22	21	19	18	16	15	—N/a	—N/a
Long format	150	138	129	120	111	102	96	90	84	78	72	69	66	63	60	57	54	51	48	45	42	39	36	33	30	—N/a	—N/a
Endurance format	300	276	258	240	222	204	192	180	168	156	144	138	132	126	120	114	108	102	96	90	84	78	72	66	60	54	48

- Short format: Used for the 60 km races of Super Sprint events and the 125 km races of Super Street events.
- Long format: Used for the 200 km races of Super Sprint events, the 250 km race of Super Street events and in both races of the Townsville 400 and Gold Coast 600.
- Endurance format: Used for the Sandown 500 and Bathurst 1000 endurance races.

=== Drivers' championship ===
Pos.	Driver	No.	ADE (South Australia)			SYM (Tasmania)			BAR (Western Australia)			WIN (Victoria (state))			HID (Northern Territory)			TOW (Queensland)		QLD (Queensland)			SMP (New South Wales)			**SAN** **(Victoria (state))**	**BAT** **(New South Wales)**	**SUR** **(Queensland)**		PUK (New Zealand)			PHI (Victoria (state))			SYD (New South Wales)			Pen.	Pts.
1	(Australia) Mark Winterbottom	5	5	11	5	2	6	5	1	**1**	15	2	1	1	2	7	5	1	1	1	1	3	2	8	16	1	2	23	11	7	4	11	7	4	**4**	**5**	3	4	0	3246
2	(Australia) Craig Lowndes	888	4	3	9	**1**	**1**	**6**	3	5	2	12	8	3	18	1	15	14	9	3	**2**	2	5	10	10	13	1	3	4	4	Ret	2	1	3	1	15	7	6	15	3008
3	(Australia) David Reynolds	55	13	17	15	6	4	11	6	7	9	4	4	6	16	10	**1**	2	3	7	4	4	4	6	6	5	**6**	2	9	3	**1**	4	25	5	10	9	2	5	0	2910
4	(New Zealand) Shane van Gisbergen	97	6	13	2	4	8	3	4	24	14	8	5	23	12	5	4	10	20	4	Ret	21	20	5	4	3	8	**1**	5	2	5	9	4	9	7	2	6	1	25	2712
5	(Australia) Jamie Whincup	1	**1**	**21**	4	7	2	1	15	2	19	9	6	10	11	16	22	9	5	8	5	8	3	1	14	**15**	18	24	7	**1**	2	1	**2**	1	3	1	**1**	2	50	2647
6	(Australia) Garth Tander	2	7	4	3	8	5	4	Ret	11	6	16	Ret	5	20	8	12	7	4	13	12	5	18	11	12	4	3	4	3	10	10	10	8	13	9	22	12	11	0	2584
7	(New Zealand) Fabian Coulthard	14	3	1	6	10	10	9	8	3	3	6	21	2	Ret	15	3	3	13	10	15	14	11	2	2	16	4	7	13	23	9	7	12	11	11	10	14	10	0	2542
8	(New Zealand) Scott McLaughlin	33	DNS	9	18	Ret	9	7	11	Ret	18	25	9	9	Ret	9	11	4	**Ret**	2	9	13	8	4	**5**	14	5	21	**6**	9	3	**6**	3	**2**	2	8	5	19	0	2205
9	(Australia) Rick Kelly	15	15	6	7	14	16	14	9	8	20	7	2	11	3	**21**	13	16	16	16	13	17	6	12	15	10	16	9	2	14	11	17	17	8	6	7	8	3	0	2154
10	(Australia) James Courtney	22	10	2	**1**	3	3	10	10	6	5	14	23	7	**23**	6	7	6	2	6	8	6						5	1	8	6	15	6	10	13	4	4	**12**	65	2110
11	(Australia) Chaz Mostert	6	2	Ret	Ret	5	12	2	**2**	4	**4**	**1**	**3**	**25**	1	3	2	**8**	6	**5**	3	**1**	**1**	**3**	1	2	DNS												0	2017
12	(Australia) Michael Caruso	23	21	Ret	14	15	23	19	18	15	10	3	10	4	5	14	21	15	11	17	11	12	16	15	7	11	13	20	10	6	15	5	19	7	22	12	15	8	40	1898
13	(Australia) Tim Slade	47	8	Ret	8	9	14	Ret	16	10	23	19	11	14	7	2	9	20	14	11	14	19	15	14	8	6	14	14	12	15	7	23	10	16	17	6	20	Ret	15	1764
14	(Australia) Lee Holdsworth	18	9	10	Ret	22	11	16	14	14	17	18	Ret	15	13	18	18	13	7	15	21	18	14	7	13	7	9	Ret	14	13	16	8	16	18	Ret	18	10	7	0	1699
15	(Australia) Will Davison	9	Ret	DNS	19	17	7	23	7	9	1	13	7	24	14	19	24	12	24	9	7	7	13	9	20	23	12	15	16	Ret	13	16	15	17	12	13	11	18	0	1672
16	(Australia) Jason Bright	8	12	5	11	19	15	12	5	13	16	11	14	13	19	13	8	19	12	Ret	16	9	10	24	3	22	7	22	23	Ret	DNS	18	14	12	23	3	23	20	75	1671
17	(Australia) Todd Kelly	7	14	12	10	23	13	13	12	12	13	5	13	12	10	12	17	17	10	19	6	Ret	17	25	24	24	20	13	17	12	17	13	11	19	5	11	16	13	0	1664
18	(Australia) James Moffat	99	11	7	Ret	12	19	22	13	20	7	17	22	19	4	11	14	11	17	DSQ	DSQ	10	12	18	Ret	18	10	10	8	11	14	14	5	14	8	24	Ret	16	10	1643
19	(Australia) Scott Pye	17				18	17	18	22	21	Ret	15	18	8	6	4	16	5	19	Ret	10	15	9	22	17	12	Ret	8	21	5	8	3	13	6	14	16	9	9	40	1589
20	(Australia) Dale Wood	21	22	18	13	13	24	15	24	19	11	24	17	21	8	22	10	24	18	21	20	24	24	21	22	20	15	11	20	21	19	19	18	20	24	14	13	21	75	1325
21	(Australia) Tim Blanchard	3	19	19	17	21	21	20	20	23	12	23	16	20	17	Ret	23	21	21	20	18	23	23	23	18	8	Ret	12	22	22	23	12	20	22	16	25	21	14	25	1272
22	(Australia) Nick Percat	222	18	14	20	16	18	17	19	17	8	10	12	16	9	Ret	6	Ret	15	12	Ret	11	21	17	9	Ret	19	6	15	16	20	Ret							25	1204
23	(Australia) David Wall	34	17	15	16	20	20	Ret	23	22	21	21	19	18	15	17	20	18	22	22	19	20	22	20	23	21	Ret	16	Ret	18	22	20	23	23	15	19	19	17	0	1118
24	(New Zealand) Andre Heimgartner	111	23	20	21	11	25	8	21	16	Ret	20	20	17	22	Ret	19	23	8	14	17	16	7	13	19	17	Ret	18	18	19	18	21							40	1068
25	(Australia) Ashley Walsh	4	20	8	Ret	Ret	22	21	17	18	22	22	15	22	21	20	Ret	22	23	18	Ret	22	25	16	21	19	Ret	19	DSQ	20	21	24							25	769
26	(Australia) Jack Perkins	22/222																					19	19	11	9	11	5	1							17	17	DSQ	0	747
27	(Australia) Warren Luff	2																								4	3	4	3										0	747
28	(Australia) Dean Canto	55/4																								5	6	2	9				22	25	18				0	733
29	(Australia) Steve Owen	5/6																								1	2	23	11							20	Ret	Ret	0	706
30	(Australia) Jonathon Webb	97																								3	8	1	5										0	699
31	(New Zealand) Steven Richards	888																								13	1	3	4										0	681
32	(Australia) Cam Waters	6																								2	DNS	17	19	17	12	22	9	15	20				0	595
33	(Australia) Luke Youlden	14																								16	4	7	13										0	516
34	(Australia) David Russell	15																								10	16	9	2										0	492
35	(France) Alexandre Prémat	33																								14	5	21	6										0	492
36	(Australia) Tony D'Alberto	47																								6	14	14	12										0	462
37	(Australia) Alex Davison	9/4																								23	12	15	16							21	22	15	0	427
38	(France) Sébastien Bourdais	18																								7	9	Ret	14										0	423
39	(Australia) Taz Douglas	99																								18	10	10	8										10	416
40	(Australia) Russell Ingall	22/6																								9	11	17	19										0	414
41	(Australia) Paul Dumbrell	1/222																								**15**	18	24	7				21	21	21				25	410
42	(Australia) Dean Fiore	23																								11	13	20	10										0	399
43	(Australia) Marcos Ambrose	17	16	16	12																					12	Ret	8	21										0	395
44	(Australia) Andrew Jones	8																								22	7	22	23										0	345
45	(Australia) Macauley Jones	21																								20	15	11	20										0	327
46	(Australia) Karl Reindler	3																								8	Ret	12	22										0	288
47	(United Kingdom) Alex Buncombe	7																								24	20	13	17										0	276
48	(New Zealand) Chris Pither	34/111																								21	Ret	16	Ret				24	24	19	23	18	Ret	0	264
49	(United Kingdom) Oliver Gavin	222																								Ret	19	6	15										0	258
50	(New Zealand) Ant Pedersen	111																								17	Ret	18	18										25	185
51	(Australia) Jack Le Brocq	4																								19	Ret	19	DSQ										0	144
52	(Australia) Aaren Russell	62																									17												0	108
52	(Australia) Drew Russell	62																									17												0	108
54	(Australia) Renee Gracie	200																									21												0	84
54	(Switzerland) Simona de Silvestro	200																									21												0	84
Pos.	Driver	No.	ADE (South Australia)			SYM (Tasmania)			BAR (Western Australia)			WIN (Victoria (state))			HID (Northern Territory)			TOW (Queensland)		QLD (Queensland)			SMP (New South Wales)			**SAN** **(Victoria (state))**	**BAT** **(New South Wales)**	**SUR** **(Queensland)**		PUK (New Zealand)			PHI (Victoria (state))			SYD (New South Wales)			Pen.	Pts.

Colour	Result
Gold	Winner
Silver	Second place
Bronze	Third place
Green	Points classification
Blue	Non-points classification
Blue	Non-classified finish (NC)
Purple	Retired, not classified (Ret)
Red	Did not qualify (DNQ)
Red	Did not pre-qualify (DNPQ)
Black	Disqualified (DSQ)
White	Did not start (DNS)
White	Withdrew (WD)
White	Race cancelled (C)
Blank	Did not practice (DNP)
Blank	Did not arrive (DNA)
Blank	Excluded (EX)

Bold - Pole position
Italics - Fastest lap
Results count toward the Endurance Cup.

=== Teams' championship ===
Pos.	Team	No.	ADE (South Australia)			SYM (Tasmania)			BAR (Western Australia)			WIN (Victoria (state))			HID (Northern Territory)			TOW (Queensland)		QLD (Queensland)			SMP (New South Wales)			**SAN** **(Victoria (state))**	**BAT** **(New South Wales)**	**SUR** **(Queensland)**		PUK (New Zealand)			PHI (Victoria (state))			SYD (New South Wales)			Pen.	Pts.
1	Triple Eight Race Engineering	1	**1**	**21**	4	7	2	1	15	2	19	9	6	10	11	16	22	9	5	8	5	8	3	1	14	**15**	18	24	7	**1**	2	1	**2**	1	3	1	**1**	2	30	5690
1	Triple Eight Race Engineering	888	4	3	9	**1**	**1**	**6**	3	5	2	12	8	3	18	1	15	14	9	3	**2**	2	5	10	10	13	1	3	4	4	Ret	2	1	3	1	15	7	6	30	5690
2	Prodrive Racing Australia	5	5	11	5	2	6	5	1	**1**	15	2	1	1	2	7	5	1	1	1	1	3	2	8	16	1	2	23	11	7	4	11	7	4	**4**	**5**	3	4	50	5554
2	Prodrive Racing Australia	6	2	Ret	Ret	5	12	2	**2**	4	**4**	**1**	**3**	**25**	1	3	2	**8**	6	**5**	3	**1**	**1**	**3**	1	2	DNS	17	19	17	12	22	9	15	20	20	Ret	Ret	50	5554
3	Holden Racing Team	2	7	4	3	8	5	4	Ret	11	6	16	Ret	5	20	8	12	7	4	13	12	5	18	11	12	4	3	4	3	10	10	10	8	13	9	22	12	11	0	5191
3	Holden Racing Team	22	10	2	**1**	3	3	10	10	6	5	14	23	7	**23**	6	7	6	2	6	8	6	19	19	11	9	11	5	1	8	6	15	6	10	13	4	4	**12**	0	5191
4	Brad Jones Racing	8	12	5	11	19	15	12	5	13	16	11	14	13	19	13	8	19	12	Ret	16	9	10	24	3	22	7	22	23	Ret	DNS	18	14	12	23	3	23	20	0	4288
4	Brad Jones Racing	14	3	1	6	10	10	9	8	3	3	6	21	2	Ret	15	3	3	13	10	15	14	11	2	2	16	4	7	13	23	9	7	12	11	11	10	14	10	0	4288
5	Nissan Motorsport	7	14	12	10	23	13	13	12	12	13	5	13	12	10	12	17	17	10	19	6	Ret	17	25	24	24	20	13	17	12	17	13	11	19	5	11	16	13	0	3818
5	Nissan Motorsport	15	15	6	7	14	16	14	9	8	20	7	2	11	3	**21**	13	16	16	16	13	17	6	12	15	10	16	9	2	14	11	17	17	8	6	7	8	3	0	3818
6	Nissan Motorsport	23	21	Ret	14	15	23	19	18	15	10	3	10	4	5	14	21	15	11	17	11	12	16	15	7	11	13	20	10	6	15	5	19	7	22	12	15	8	0	3591
6	Nissan Motorsport	99	11	7	Ret	12	19	22	13	20	7	17	22	19	4	11	14	11	17	DSQ	DSQ	10	12	18	Ret	18	10	10	8	11	14	14	5	14	8	24	Ret	16	0	3591
7	Garry Rogers Motorsport	33	DNS	9	18	Ret	9	7	11	Ret	18	25	9	9	Ret	9	11	4	**Ret**	2	9	13	8	4	**5**	14	5	21	**6**	9	3	**6**	3	**2**	2	8	5	19	0	3323
7	Garry Rogers Motorsport	34	17	15	16	20	20	Ret	23	22	21	21	19	18	15	17	20	18	22	22	19	20	22	20	23	21	Ret	16	Ret	18	22	20	23	23	15	19	19	17	0	3323
8	Rod Nash Racing	55	13	17	15	6	4	11	6	7	9	4	4	6	16	10	**1**	2	3	7	4	4	4	6	6	5	**6**	2	9	3	**1**	4	25	5	10	9	2	5	0	2910
9	Tekno Autosports	97	6	13	2	4	8	3	4	24	14	8	5	23	12	5	4	10	20	4	Ret	21	20	5	4	3	8	**1**	5	2	5	9	4	9	7	2	6	1	0	2737
10	Lucas Dumbrell Motorsport	3	19	19	17	21	21	20	20	23	12	23	16	20	17	Ret	23	21	21	20	18	23	23	23	18	8	Ret	12	22	22	23	12	20	22	16	25	21	14	30	2634
10	Lucas Dumbrell Motorsport	222	18	14	20	16	18	17	19	17	8	10	12	16	9	Ret	6	Ret	15	12	Ret	11	21	17	9	Ret	19	6	15	16	20	15	21	21	21	17	17	DSQ	30	2634
11	Erebus Motorsport	4	20	8	Ret	Ret	22	21	17	18	22	22	15	22	21	20	Ret	22	23	18	Ret	22	25	16	21	19	Ret	19	DSQ	20	21	24	22	25	18	21	22	15	30	2621
11	Erebus Motorsport	9	Ret	DNS	19	17	7	23	7	9	1	13	7	24	14	19	24	12	24	9	7	7	13	9	20	23	12	15	16	Ret	13	16	15	17	12	13	11	18	30	2621
12	Walkinshaw Racing	47	8	Ret	8	9	14	Ret	16	10	23	19	11	14	7	2	9	20	14	11	14	19	15	14	8	6	14	14	12	15	7	23	10	16	17	6	20	Ret	0	1779
13	DJR Team Penske	17	16	16	12	18	17	18	22	21	Ret	15	18	8	6	4	16	5	19	Ret	10	15	9	22	17	12	Ret	8	21	5	8	3	13	6	14	16	9	9	0	1754
14	Charlie Schwerkolt Racing	18	9	10	Ret	22	11	16	14	14	17	18	Ret	15	13	18	18	13	7	15	21	18	14	7	13	7	9	Ret	14	13	16	8	16	18	Ret	18	10	7	0	1699
15	Britek Motorsport	21	22	18	13	13	24	15	24	19	11	24	17	21	8	22	10	24	18	21	20	24	24	21	22	20	15	11	20	21	19	19	18	20	24	14	13	22	0	1367
16	Super Black Racing	111	23	20	21	11	25	8	21	16	Ret	20	20	17	22	Ret	19	23	8	14	17	16	7	13	19	17	Ret	18	18	23	12	23	24	24	19	23	18	Ret	0	1231
17	Novocastrian Motorsport (w)	62																									17												0	108
18	Prodrive Racing Australia (w)	200																									21												0	84
Pos.	Driver	No.	ADE (South Australia)			SYM (Tasmania)			BAR (Western Australia)			WIN (Victoria (state))			HID (Northern Territory)			TOW (Queensland)		QLD (Queensland)			SMP (New South Wales)			**SAN** **(Victoria (state))**	**BAT** **(New South Wales)**	**SUR** **(Queensland)**		PUK (New Zealand)			PHI (Victoria (state))			SYD (New South Wales)			Pen.	Pts.

Colour	Result
Gold	Winner
Silver	Second place
Bronze	Third place
Green	Points classification
Blue	Non-points classification
Blue	Non-classified finish (NC)
Purple	Retired, not classified (Ret)
Red	Did not qualify (DNQ)
Red	Did not pre-qualify (DNPQ)
Black	Disqualified (DSQ)
White	Did not start (DNS)
White	Withdrew (WD)
White	Race cancelled (C)
Blank	Did not practice (DNP)
Blank	Did not arrive (DNA)
Blank	Excluded (EX)

Bold - Pole position
Italics - Fastest lap
Results count toward the Endurance Cup.

- (w) denotes wildcard entry

=== Enduro Cup ===
Pos.	Drivers	No.	**SAN** **(Victoria (state))**	**BAT** **(New South Wales)**	**SUR** **(Queensland)**		Pen.	Pts.
1	Garth Tander / Warren Luff	2	4	3	4	3	0	747
2	Shane van Gisbergen / Jonathon Webb	97	3	8	**1**	5	0	699
3	Mark Winterbottom / Steve Owen	5	1	2	23	11	0	684
4	Craig Lowndes / Steven Richards	888	13	1	3	4	0	681
5	David Reynolds / Dean Canto	55	5	**6**	2	9	0	648
6	Jack Perkins / Russell Ingall / James Courtney	22	9	11	5	1	0	573
7	Fabian Coulthard / Luke Youlden	14	16	4	7	13	0	516
8	Rick Kelly / David Russell	15	10	16	9	2	0	492
9	Scott McLaughlin / Alexandre Prémat	33	14	5	21	**6**	0	492
10	Tim Slade / Tony D'Alberto	47	6	14	14	12	0	462
11	Lee Holdsworth / Sébastien Bourdais	18	7	9	Ret	14	0	423
12	James Moffat / Taz Douglas	99	18	10	10	8	10	416
13	Michael Caruso / Dean Fiore	23	11	13	20	10	0	399
14	Chaz Mostert / Cam Waters / Russell Ingall	6	2	DNS	17	19	0	378
15	Jason Bright / Andrew Jones	8	22	7	22	23	0	345
16	Dale Wood / Macauley Jones	21	20	15	11	20	0	327
17	Will Davison / Alex Davison	9	23	12	15	16	0	327
18	Jamie Whincup / Paul Dumbrell	1	**15**	18	24	7	25	326
19	Tim Blanchard / Karl Reindler	3	8	Ret	12	22	0	288
20	Todd Kelly / Alex Buncombe	7	24	20	13	17	0	276
21	Scott Pye / Marcos Ambrose	17	12	Ret	8	21	0	270
22	Nick Percat / Oliver Gavin	222	Ret	19	6	15	0	258
23	Andre Heimgartner / Ant Pedersen	111	17	Ret	18	18	25	185
24	Ashley Walsh / Jack Le Brocq	4	19	Ret	19	DSQ	0	144
25	David Wall / Chris Pither	34	21	Ret	16	Ret	0	141
26	Aaren Russell / Drew Russell	62		17			0	108
27	Simona de Silvestro / Renee Gracie	200		21			0	84
Pos.	Drivers	No.	**SAN** **(Victoria (state))**	**BAT** **(New South Wales)**	**SUR** **(Queensland)**		Pen.	Pts.

Colour	Result
Gold	Winner
Silver	Second place
Bronze	Third place
Green	Points classification
Blue	Non-points classification
Blue	Non-classified finish (NC)
Purple	Retired, not classified (Ret)
Red	Did not qualify (DNQ)
Red	Did not pre-qualify (DNPQ)
Black	Disqualified (DSQ)
White	Did not start (DNS)
White	Withdrew (WD)
White	Race cancelled (C)
Blank	Did not practice (DNP)
Blank	Did not arrive (DNA)
Blank	Excluded (EX)

Bold - Pole position
Italics - Fastest lap

=== Manufacturers' championship ===
The Manufacturers' championship was won by Holden.

== See also ==
- 2015 V8 Supercar season
