= 2005 Australian Production Car Championship =

The 2005 Australian Production Car Championship was a CAMS sanctioned national motor racing title open to Group 3E Series Production Cars. It was organised by the Production Car Association of Australia and was the 12th Australian Production Car Championship. The title was won by Colin Osborne driving a Toyota Celica.

== Race calendar ==
The championship was contested over a seven round series with three races per round. Race 1 at each round utilised a mass standing start and Races 2 and 3 at each round featured a handicap standing start.

Round	Circuit	Date	Round winner	Car
1	Wakefield Park	26-27 February	Derek Hocking	Holden VY Commodore SS
2	Mallala	16-17 April	Derek Hocking *	Holden VY Commodore SS
3	Queensland Raceway	2-3 June	Drew Russell	Honda S2000
4	Eastern Creek	23-24 July	Scott Anderson	Holden VZ Commodore SS
5	Phillip Island	20-21 August	Colin Osborne	Toyota Celica SX
6	Oran Park	17-18 September	Leigh Mertens	Proton Satria GTi
7	Eastern Creek	3-4 December	Steve Briffa	Toyota Celica SX

- Note: Hocking was subsequently disqualified from Round 2 due to illegally modified suspension components

== Points system ==
Points for class and outright were awarded on race results as follows:

Position	1st	2nd	3rd	4th	5th	6th	7th	8th	9th	10th	11th	12th	13th	14th & other finishers
Points	30	25	22	20	18	16	14	12	10	8	6	4	2	1

In addition, the fastest competitor in each Class in Qualifying was awarded 3 points towards both class and outright.

Race 1 at each round had points awarded for class titles only and Races 2 and 3 at each round had points awarded for both class and outright titles.

Competitors registered as “Trophy” competitors are not eligible to score points in the championship.

== Championship results ==
Position	Driver	No.	Car	Entrant	Points
1	Colin Osborne	13	Toyota Celica SX	Osborne Motorsport	284
2	Drew Russell	28	Honda S2000	Go - Karts - Go	265
3	Daniel Natoli	21	Proton Satria GTi	Graham Roylett	204
4	Leigh Mertens	77	Proton Satria GTi	C V G Gas	204
5	Allan Shephard	27	Honda Integra Type R	Thrifty Car Rentals	194
6	Trevor Keene	31	Toyota Celica SX	Osborne Motorsport	192
7	Scott Anderson	19	Ford AUIII Falcon XR8; Holden VZ Commodore SS	Elf Oil	146
8	Nick Dunkley	12	Ford BA Falcon XR6 Turbo	Dayco/ Ontrack Motorsport	128
9	John Houlder	2	Ford BA Falcon XR8	In-Tune Motorsport	126
10	Lauren Gray	15	Toyota Echo Sportivo	Car Feash/Flexi Quote/ Powcon	111
11	Steve Briffa	72	Toyota Celica SX	Thrifty Car Rentals	107
12	Dane Rudolph	29	Citroen Xsara VTS	Cuttaway Hill Wines	99
13	Veijo Phillips	83	Ford BA Falcon XR6 Turbo	Hocking Racing Shop	99
14	David Ryan	30	Ford BA Falcon XR6 Turbo	Shell / Thomson Ford	84
15	Derek Hocking	62	Holden VY Commodore SS	Redback	58
16	Michael Craig	30	Ford BA Falcon XR6 Turbo	Shell / Thomson Ford	44
17	David Mertens	71	Holden Vectra	Quadrant / Bilstein	31
18	Martin Doxey	17	Holden Astra	M Doxey	30
19	Darren Best	76	Ford Focus ST170	Darren Best	28
20	Shane Baker	3	Proton Satria GTi	Proton Cars Australia	25
21	Rick Bates	42	Toyota Corolla Sportivo	Wayne Russell	22
Class A
1	Drew Russell	28	Honda S2000	Go - Karts - Go	477
2	John Houlder	2	Ford BA Falcon XR8	In-Tune Motorsport	300
3	Nick Dunkley	12	Ford BA Falcon XR6 Turbo	Dayco/ Ontrack Motorsport	286
4	Veijo Phillips	83	Ford BA Falcon XR6 Turbo	Hocking Racing Shop	279
5	Scott Anderson	19	Ford AUIII Falcon XR8; Holden VZ Commodore SS	Elf Oil	275
6	David Ryan	30	Ford BA Falcon XR6 Turbo	Shell / Thomson Ford	249
Class B
1	Colin Osborne	13	Toyota Celica SX	Osborne Motorsport	585
2	Allan Shephard	27	Honda Integra Type R	Thrifty Car Rentals	425
3	Trevor Keene	31	Toyota Celica SX	Osborne Motorsport	417
4	Steve Briffa	72	Toyota Celica SX	Thrifty Car Rentals	233
Class C
1	Daniel Natoli	21	Proton Satria GTi	Graham Roylett	565
2	Leigh Mertens	77	Proton Satria GTi	C V G Gas	451
3	Lauren Gray	15	Toyota Echo Sportivo	Car Feash/Flexi Quote/ Powcon	418
4	Dane Rudolph	29	Citroen Xsara VTS	Cuttaway Hill Wines	299
5	Darren Best	76	Ford Focus ST170	Darren Best	127
6	David Mertens	71	Holden Vectra	Quadrant / Bilstein	119
