= 2015 Bathurst 1000 =

Motor race in Australia

2015 Supercheap Auto Bathurst 1000

Seasons
- ← 2014 2016 →

(New South Wales) 2015 Supercheap Auto Bathurst 1000
Event Information
- Round 10 of 14 in the 2015 International V8 Supercars Championship
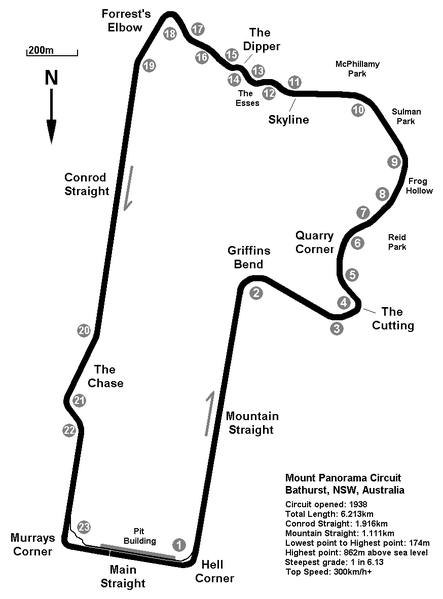
- Date: 8–11 October 2015
- Location: Bathurst, New South Wales
- Venue: Mount Panorama Circuit
- Weather: Overcast, rain midway through race

Results
Race 1
| Distance | 161 laps | 1000 km |
| Pole position | David Reynolds; Rod Nash Racing | 2:27.8201 |
| Winner | Craig Lowndes; Steven Richards; Triple Eight Race Engineering | 6:16:07.7064 |

The 2015 Supercheap Auto Bathurst 1000 was a motor race for V8 Supercars held on 11 October 2015 at the Mount Panorama Circuit, Bathurst, New South Wales. It was the twenty-fifth race of the 2015 International V8 Supercars Championship.

The race was won by Triple Eight Race Engineering pairing Craig Lowndes and Steven Richards in their Holden VF Commodore. Lowndes became the fifth driver to win at least six Bathurst 1000s, while Richards himself became a four-time winner of the race with his fourth different co-driver. Lowndes and Richards finished 1.3 seconds clear of the Prodrive Racing Australia Ford FG X Falcon of championship leader Mark Winterbottom and his co-driver Steve Owen.

The podium was completed by Garth Tander and Warren Luff in a Holden VF Commodore of the Holden Racing Team, a further 2.6 seconds behind.

== Background ==
The 2015 race was the nineteenth running of the Australian 1000 race, which was first held after the organisational split between the Australian Racing Drivers Club and V8 Supercars Australia that saw two "Bathurst 1000" races contested in both 1997 and 1998. The 2015 race was the 58th race for which the lineage can be traced back to the 1960 Armstrong 500 – held at Phillip Island – and the 55th to be held at Mount Panorama.

In addition to the twenty-five regular championship entries, two wildcard entries were accepted for the 2015 race. The first was a Holden VF Commodore run by Dunlop Series team Novocastrian Motorsport for Aaren Russell and Drew Russell. The second was a Prodrive Racing Australia-prepared Ford FG X Falcon for the all-female driver combination of Renee Gracie and Swiss IndyCar Series and Formula E racer Simona de Silvestro, run under the name "Harvey Norman Supergirls".

Regular Holden Racing Team driver James Courtney did not take part in the race due to injuries sustained at the 2015 Sydney Motorsport Park Super Sprint in August. Russell Ingall replaced Courtney, having done the same at the preceding Wilson Security Sandown 500.

Chaz Mostert and Paul Morris were the defending race winners, though Morris did not compete in the race due to his role as co-driver for Mostert being taken by Cam Waters.

=== Entry list ===
Twenty-seven cars entered the event - 13 Holden Commodores, six Ford Falcons, four Nissan Altimas, two Mercedes-Benz E63 and two Volvo S60s. In addition to the 25 regular entries, two wildcards were entered, one from Novocastrian Motorsport with brothers Aaren and Drew Russell and one from Prodrive Racing Australia with Renee Gracie and Simona de Silvestro, marking the first time since 1998 that an all women pairing raced in the Bathurst 1000, after Kerryn Brewer and Melinda Price. Six drivers made their debut in the race; all four 'Wildcard' drivers and Dunlop Series drivers Jack Le Brocq and Macauley Jones. It was the last start for two-time champion Marcos Ambrose.

| No. | Drivers | Team (Sponsor) | Car | No. | Drivers | Team (Sponsor) | Car |
|---|---|---|---|---|---|---|---|
| 1 | (Australia) Jamie Whincup (Australia) Paul Dumbrell | Triple Eight Race Engineering (Red Bull) | Holden Commodore VF | 22 | (Australia) Jack Perkins (Australia) Russell Ingall | Holden Racing Team (Holden, SP Tools, Star Wars) | Holden Commodore VF |
| 2 | (Australia) Garth Tander (Australia) Warren Luff | Holden Racing Team (Holden, SP Tools, Star Wars) | Holden Commodore VF | 23 | (Australia) Michael Caruso (Australia) Dean Fiore | Nissan Motorsport (Nissan) | Nissan Altima L33 |
| 3 | (Australia) Tim Blanchard (Australia) Karl Reindler | Lucas Dumbrell Motorsport (CoolDrive) | Holden Commodore VF | 33 | (New Zealand) Scott McLaughlin (France) Alexandre Prémat | Garry Rogers Motorsport (Wilson Security) | Volvo S60 |
| 4 | (Australia) Ashley Walsh (Australia) Jack Le Brocq | Erebus Motorsport (Wendy's Ice Cream) | Mercedes-Benz E63 AMG | 34 | (Australia) David Wall (New Zealand) Chris Pither | Garry Rogers Motorsport (Wilson Security) | Volvo S60 |
| 5 | (Australia) Mark Winterbottom (Australia) Steve Owen | Prodrive Racing Australia (Pepsi Max) | Ford Falcon FG X | 47 | (Australia) Tim Slade (Australia) Tony D'Alberto | Walkinshaw Racing (Supercheap Auto) | Holden Commodore VF |
| 6 | (Australia) Chaz Mostert (Australia) Cam Waters | Prodrive Racing Australia (Pepsi Max) | Ford Falcon FG X | 55 | (Australia) David Reynolds (Australia) Dean Canto | Rod Nash Racing (The Bottle-O) | Ford Falcon FG X |
| 7 | (Australia) Todd Kelly (United Kingdom) Alex Buncombe | Nissan Motorsport (carsales.com) | Nissan Altima L33 | 62 | (Australia) Aaren Russell (Australia) Drew Russell | Novocastrian Motorsport (Plus Fitness) | Holden Commodore VF |
| 8 | (Australia) Jason Bright (Australia) Andrew Jones | Brad Jones Racing (BOC Gas and Gear) | Holden Commodore VF | 97 | (New Zealand) Shane van Gisbergen (Australia) Jonathon Webb | Tekno Autosports (Darrell Lea STIX) | Holden Commodore VF |
| 9 | (Australia) Will Davison (Australia) Alex Davison | Erebus Motorsport (Penrite) | Mercedes-Benz E63 AMG | 99 | (Australia) James Moffat (Australia) Taz Douglas | Nissan Motorsport (Mack Trucks) | Nissan Altima L33 |
| 14 | (New Zealand) Fabian Coulthard (Australia) Luke Youlden | Brad Jones Racing (Freightliner) | Holden Commodore VF | 111 | (New Zealand) Andre Heimgartner (New Zealand) Ant Pedersen | Super Black Racing (Super Black Racing) | Ford Falcon FG X |
| 15 | (Australia) Rick Kelly (Australia) David Russell | Nissan Motorsport (Jack Daniel's Cola) | Nissan Altima L33 | 200 | (Australia) Renee Gracie (Switzerland) Simona de Silvestro | Prodrive Racing Australia (Harvey Norman) | Ford Falcon FG X |
| 17 | (Australia) Scott Pye (Australia) Marcos Ambrose | DJR Team Penske (Xbox) | Ford Falcon FG X | 222 | (Australia) Nick Percat (United Kingdom) Oliver Gavin | Lucas Dumbrell Motorsport (OPS Gateway) | Holden Commodore VF |
| 18 | (Australia) Lee Holdsworth (France) Sébastien Bourdais | Team 18 (Preston Hire) | Holden Commodore VF | 888 | (Australia) Craig Lowndes (New Zealand) Steven Richards | Triple Eight Race Engineering (Red Bull) | Holden Commodore VF |
| 21 | (Australia) Dale Wood (Australia) Macauley Jones | Britek Motorsport (ADVAM, GB Galvanising) | Holden Commodore VF | | | | |

Entries with a grey background were wildcard entries which did not compete in the full championship season.

== Report ==
=== Free Practice ===
The first free practice session took place on the Thursday morning prior to the race and was open to both championship drivers and co-drivers. Defending race winner Chaz Mostert set the fastest lap time during the session, his time of 2:06.3223 being 1.7 seconds quicker than his time in the corresponding session in 2014. David Reynolds was second fastest ahead of Shane van Gisbergen. Garth Tander was the first driver to go off the circuit, spinning into the sand at Hell Corner, while Tim Blanchard was the first driver to hit the wall, also at Hell Corner. The second practice session was held on Thursday afternoon and was open only to co-drivers. Warren Luff set the fastest lap time ahead of Dean Canto and Steven Richards. David Russell crashed at the Cutting, causing enough damage to take the car out of the third practice session held later that afternoon. The third session saw Fabian Coulthard break his own practice lap record with a time of 2:05.4786, compared to the time of 2:05.6080 he set in the 2014 qualifying session. Mark Winterbottom, Reynolds, Mostert and Van Gisbergen all set times in the 2:05 bracket as well. Reynolds was fined A$25,000 following the Thursday press conference where he referred to the entry of Renee Gracie and Simona de Silvestro as the "pussy wagon". Reynolds later apologised for his remark.

The fourth free practice session was held on Friday morning and was another session for co-drivers only. Cam Waters was fastest with a time of 2:05.7220, while Luke Youlden was the only other driver to set a time under 2:06. In the fifth practice session, held later on Friday morning, Jamie Whincup became the first driver to set a lap time under 2:05 in a V8 Supercar, recording a time of 2:04.9097. Scott Pye also went faster than Coulthard's record, setting a time of 2:05.2436.

Summary

| Session | Time | No. | Driver | Team | Car | Fastest lap | Weather |
Thursday
| Practice 1 | 11:15 | 6 | Chaz Mostert | Prodrive Racing Australia | Ford FG X Falcon | 2:06.3223 | Dry, sunny |
| Practice 2 | 13:20 | 2 | Warren Luff | Holden Racing Team | Holden VF Commodore | 2:07.2034 | Dry, sunny |
| Practice 3 | 15:20 | 14 | Fabian Coulthard | Brad Jones Racing | Holden VF Commodore | 2:05.4786 | Dry, sunny |
Friday
| Practice 4 | 09:10 | 6 | Cam Waters | Prodrive Racing Australia | Ford FG X Falcon | 2:05.7220 | Dry, sunny |
| Practice 5 | 11:40 | 1 | Jamie Whincup | Triple Eight Race Engineering | Holden VF Commodore | 2:04.9097 | Dry, sunny |
Saturday
| Practice 6 | 10:20 | 14 | Fabian Coulthard | Brad Jones Racing | Holden VF Commodore | 2:05.2119 | Dry, sunny |

=== Qualifying ===
A forty-minute qualifying session was scheduled to take place on Friday afternoon, with the fastest ten drivers in the session to proceed to the Top Ten Shootout on Saturday. However, the session was stopped after five minutes following a heavy crash for Mostert. He clipped the inside wall at turn 16 on the run down to Forrest's Elbow before making heavy contact with the opposite wall. The car then bounced across the circuit and rode up along the outside wall at the right-hand bend preceding Forrest's Elbow, with the rear end of the car knocking the roof off of a marshals' post, the contact resulting in a slow 360° spin before coming to rest at the entry to Forrest's Elbow. Mostert suffered a broken left femur and left wrist, while three of the marshals stationed at the marshals' post were also injured. Mostert and one of the marshals were flown to Orange Hospital while the other two marshals were treated at the circuit's medical centre. The remainder of the qualifying session, as well as a following support race, were cancelled due to the damage caused to the marshals' post and the surrounding safety fencing. The entry of Mostert and Waters was withdrawn from the event due to the damage sustained by the car and Mostert's injuries, while the qualifying session was postponed to Saturday afternoon and shortened to thirty minutes.

== Classification ==
=== Qualifying ===
| Pos. | No. | Driver | Team | Car | Lap time | Difference | Grid |
|---|---|---|---|---|---|---|---|
| 1 | 14 | (New Zealand) Fabian Coulthard | Brad Jones Racing | Holden VF Commodore | 2:06.1838 | | Top Ten |
| 2 | 97 | (New Zealand) Shane van Gisbergen | Tekno Autosports | Holden VF Commodore | 2:06.4470 | +0.2632 | Top Ten |
| 3 | 47 | (Australia) Tim Slade | Walkinshaw Racing | Holden VF Commodore | 2:06.5063 | +0.3225 | Top Ten |
| 4 | 1 | (Australia) Jamie Whincup | Triple Eight Race Engineering | Holden VF Commodore | 2:06.5248 | +0.3410 | Top Ten |
| 5 | 17 | (Australia) Scott Pye | DJR Team Penske | Ford FG X Falcon | 2:06.5656 | +0.3818 | Top Ten |
| 6 | 8 | (Australia) Jason Bright | Brad Jones Racing | Holden VF Commodore | 2:06.5999 | +0.4161 | Top Ten |
| 7 | 33 | (New Zealand) Scott McLaughlin | Garry Rogers Motorsport | Volvo S60 | 2:06.7177 | +0.5339 | Top Ten |
| 8 | 55 | (Australia) David Reynolds | Rod Nash Racing | Ford FG X Falcon | 2:06.7813 | +0.5975 | Top Ten |
| 9 | 18 | (Australia) Lee Holdsworth | Charlie Schwerkolt Racing | Holden VF Commodore | 2:06.8796 | +0.6958 | Top Ten |
| 10 | 99 | (Australia) James Moffat | Nissan Motorsport | Nissan Altima L33 | 2:06.9147 | +0.7309 | Top Ten |
| 11 | 9 | (Australia) Will Davison | Erebus Motorsport | Mercedes-Benz E63 AMG | 2:06.9696 | +0.7858 | 11 |
| 12 | 111 | (New Zealand) Andre Heimgartner | Super Black Racing | Ford FG X Falcon | 2:07.0383 | +0.8545 | 12 |
| 13 | 21 | (Australia) Dale Wood | Britek Motorsport | Holden VF Commodore | 2:07.1684 | +0.9846 | 13 |
| 14 | 5 | (Australia) Mark Winterbottom | Prodrive Racing Australia | Ford FG X Falcon | 2:07.2072 | +1.0234 | 14 |
| 15 | 888 | (Australia) Craig Lowndes | Triple Eight Race Engineering | Holden VF Commodore | 2:07.2586 | +1.0748 | 15 |
| 16 | 7 | (Australia) Todd Kelly | Nissan Motorsport | Nissan Altima L33 | 2:07.3073 | +1.1235 | 16 |
| 17 | 22 | (Australia) Jack Perkins | Holden Racing Team | Holden VF Commodore | 2:07.3769 | +1.1931 | 17 |
| 18 | 23 | (Australia) Michael Caruso | Nissan Motorsport | Nissan Altima L33 | 2:07.3817 | +1.1979 | 18 |
| 19 | 15 | (Australia) Rick Kelly | Nissan Motorsport | Nissan Altima L33 | 2:07.5675 | +1.3837 | 19 |
| 20 | 34 | (Australia) David Wall | Garry Rogers Motorsport | Volvo S60 | 2:07.9764 | +1.7926 | 20 |
| 21 | 222 | (Australia) Nick Percat | Lucas Dumbrell Motorsport | Holden VF Commodore | 2:08.0596 | +1.8758 | 21 |
| 22 | 2 | (Australia) Garth Tander | Holden Racing Team | Holden VF Commodore | 2:08.0756 | +1.8918 | 22 |
| 23 | 3 | (Australia) Tim Blanchard | Lucas Dumbrell Motorsport | Holden VF Commodore | 2:08.8787 | +2.6949 | 23 |
| 24 | 62 | (Australia) Aaren Russell | Novocastrian Motorsport | Holden VF Commodore | 2:09.2779 | +3.0941 | 24 |
| 25 | 200 | (Switzerland) Simona de Silvestro | Prodrive Racing Australia | Ford FG X Falcon | 2:09.6484 | +3.4646 | 25 |
| 26 | 4 | (Australia) Ashley Walsh | Erebus Motorsport | Mercedes-Benz E63 AMG | 2:10.5793 | +4.3955 | 26 |
| –^{1} | 6 | (Australia) Chaz Mostert | Prodrive Racing Australia | Ford FG X Falcon | | | |

Notes:

- ^1 – Chaz Mostert did not take part in the rescheduled qualifying session after crashing heavily in the original qualifying session.

=== Top Ten Shootout ===
| Pos. | No. | Driver | Team | Running order | Qualifying time | Qualifying position | Shootout time | Final grid position |
|---|---|---|---|---|---|---|---|---|
| 1 | 55 | (Australia) David Reynolds | Rod Nash Racing | 3rd | 2:06.7813 | 8th | 2:27.8201 | 1st |
| 2 | 33 | (New Zealand) Scott McLaughlin | Garry Rogers Motorsport | 4th | 2:06.7177 | 7th | 2:28.9746 | 2nd |
| 3 | 8 | (Australia) Jason Bright | Brad Jones Racing | 5th | 2:06.5999 | 6th | 2:29.7006 | 3rd |
| 4 | 18 | (Australia) Lee Holdsworth | Charlie Schwerkolt Racing | 2nd | 2:06.8796 | 9th | 2:29.8139 | 4th |
| 5 | 99 | (Australia) James Moffat | Nissan Motorsport | 1st | 2:06.9147 | 10th | 2:30.0084 | 5th |
| 6 | 97 | (New Zealand) Shane van Gisbergen | Tekno Autosports | 9th | 2:06.4470 | 2nd | 2:30.8456 | 6th |
| 7 | 17 | (Australia) Scott Pye | DJR Team Penske | 6th | 2:06.5656 | 5th | 2:31.6312 | 7th |
| 8 | 1 | (Australia) Jamie Whincup | Triple Eight Race Engineering | 7th | 2:06.5248 | 4th | 2:32.0536 | 8th |
| 9 | 14 | (New Zealand) Fabian Coulthard | Brad Jones Racing | 10th | 2:06.1838 | 1st | 2:32.1246 | 9th |
| 10 | 47 | (Australia) Tim Slade | Walkinshaw Racing | 8th | 2:06.5063 | 3rd | 2:34.7168 | 10th |

=== Starting grid ===
The following table represents the final starting grid for the race on Sunday:

| Inside row | | | Outside row | | |
|---|---|---|---|---|---|
| 1 | (Australia) David Reynolds (Australia) Dean Canto | 55 | 33 | (New Zealand) Scott McLaughlin (France) Alexandre Prémat | 2 |
| 1 | Rod Nash Racing (Ford Falcon FG X) | | Garry Rogers Motorsport (Volvo S60) | | 2 |
| 3 | (Australia) Jason Bright (Australia) Andrew Jones | 8 | 18 | (Australia) Lee Holdsworth (France) Sébastien Bourdais | 4 |
| 3 | Brad Jones Racing (Holden Commodore VF) | | Charlie Schwerkolt Racing (Holden Commodore VF) | | 4 |
| 5 | (Australia) James Moffat (Australia) Taz Douglas | 99 | 97 | (New Zealand) Shane van Gisbergen (Australia) Jonathon Webb | 6 |
| 5 | Nissan Motorsport (Nissan Altima L33) | | Tekno Autosports (Holden Commodore VF) | | 6 |
| 7 | (Australia) Scott Pye (Australia) Marcos Ambrose | 17 | 1 | (Australia) Jamie Whincup (Australia) Paul Dumbrell | 8 |
| 7 | DJR Team Penske (Ford Falcon FG X) | | Triple Eight Race Engineering (Holden Commodore VF) | | 8 |
| 9 | (New Zealand) Fabian Coulthard (Australia) Luke Youlden | 14 | 47 | (Australia) Tim Slade (Australia) Tony D'Alberto | 10 |
| 9 | Brad Jones Racing (Holden Commodore VF) | | Walkinshaw Racing (Holden Commodore VF) | | 10 |
| 11 | (Australia) Will Davison (Australia) Alex Davison | 9 | 111 | (New Zealand) Andre Heimgartner (New Zealand) Ant Pedersen | 12 |
| 11 | Erebus Motorsport (Mercedes-Benz E63 AMG) | | Super Black Racing (Ford Falcon FG X) | | 12 |
| 13 | (Australia) Dale Wood (Australia) Macauley Jones | 21 | 5 | (Australia) Mark Winterbottom (Australia) Steve Owen | 14 |
| 13 | Britek Motorsport (Holden Commodore VF) | | Prodrive Racing Australia (Ford Falcon FG X) | | 14 |
| 15 | (Australia) Craig Lowndes (New Zealand) Steven Richards | 888 | 7 | (Australia) Todd Kelly (United Kingdom) Alex Buncombe | 16 |
| 15 | Triple Eight Race Engineering (Holden Commodore VF) | | Nissan Motorsport (Nissan Altima L33) | | 16 |
| 17 | (Australia) Jack Perkins (Australia) Russell Ingall | 22 | 23 | (Australia) Michael Caruso (Australia) Dean Fiore | 18 |
| 17 | Holden Racing Team (Holden Commodore VF) | | Nissan Motorsport (Nissan Altima L33) | | 18 |
| 19 | (Australia) Rick Kelly (Australia) David Russell | 15 | 34 | (Australia) David Wall (New Zealand) Chris Pither | 20 |
| 19 | Nissan Motorsport (Nissan Altima L33) | | Garry Rogers Motorsport (Volvo S60) | | 20 |
| 21 | (Australia) Nick Percat (United Kingdom) Oliver Gavin | 222 | 2 | (Australia) Garth Tander (Australia) Warren Luff | 22 |
| 21 | Lucas Dumbrell Motorsport (Holden Commodore VF) | | Holden Racing Team (Holden Commodore VF) | | 22 |
| 23 | (Australia) Tim Blanchard (Australia) Karl Reindler | 3 | 62 | (Australia) Aaren Russell (Australia) Drew Russell | 24 |
| 23 | Lucas Dumbrell Motorsport (Holden Commodore VF) | | Novocastrian Motorsport (Holden Commodore VF) | | 24 |
| 25 | (Switzerland) Simona de Silvestro (Australia) Renee Gracie | 200 | 4 | (Australia) Ashley Walsh (Australia) Jack Le Brocq | 26 |
| 25 | Prodrive Racing Australia (Ford Falcon FG X) | | Erebus Motorsport (Mercedes-Benz E63 AMG) | | 26 |

=== Race ===
| Pos. | No. | Drivers | Team | Car | Laps | Time/Retired | Grid | Points |
|---|---|---|---|---|---|---|---|---|
| 1 | 888 | (Australia) Craig Lowndes (New Zealand) Steven Richards | Triple Eight Race Engineering | Holden VF Commodore | 161 | 6hr 16min 7.7064sec | 15 | 300 |
| 2 | 5 | (Australia) Mark Winterbottom (Australia) Steve Owen | Prodrive Racing Australia | Ford FG X Falcon | 161 | +1.4 s | 14 | 276 |
| 3 | 2 | (Australia) Garth Tander (Australia) Warren Luff | Holden Racing Team | Holden VF Commodore | 161 | +4.0 s | 22 | 258 |
| 4 | 14 | (New Zealand) Fabian Coulthard (Australia) Luke Youlden | Brad Jones Racing | Holden VF Commodore | 161 | +4.4 s | 9 | 240 |
| 5 | 33 | (New Zealand) Scott McLaughlin (France) Alexandre Prémat | Garry Rogers Motorsport | Volvo S60 | 161 | +9.7 s | 2 | 222 |
| 6 | 55 | (Australia) David Reynolds (Australia) Dean Canto | Rod Nash Racing | Ford FG X Falcon | 161 | +11.0 s | 1 | 204 |
| 7 | 8 | (Australia) Jason Bright (Australia) Andrew Jones | Brad Jones Racing | Holden VF Commodore | 161 | +12.0 s | 3 | 192 |
| 8 | 97 | (New Zealand) Shane van Gisbergen (Australia) Jonathon Webb | Tekno Autosports | Holden VF Commodore | 161 | +14.3 s | 6 | 180 |
| 9 | 18 | (Australia) Lee Holdsworth (France) Sébastien Bourdais | Charlie Schwerkolt Racing | Holden VF Commodore | 161 | +14.7 s | 4 | 168 |
| 10 | 99 | (Australia) James Moffat (Australia) Taz Douglas | Nissan Motorsport | Nissan Altima L33 | 161 | +20.2 s | 5 | 156 |
| 11 | 22 | (Australia) Jack Perkins (Australia) Russell Ingall | Holden Racing Team | Holden VF Commodore | 161 | +21.2 s | 17 | 144 |
| 12 | 9 | (Australia) Will Davison (Australia) Alex Davison | Erebus Motorsport | Mercedes-Benz E63 AMG | 161 | +21.6 s | 11 | 138 |
| 13 | 23 | (Australia) Michael Caruso (Australia) Dean Fiore | Nissan Motorsport | Nissan Altima L33 | 161 | +29.6 s | 18 | 132 |
| 14 | 47 | (Australia) Tim Slade (Australia) Tony D'Alberto | Walkinshaw Racing | Holden VF Commodore | 161 | +31.6 s | 10 | 126 |
| 15 | 21 | (Australia) Dale Wood (Australia) Macauley Jones | Britek Motorsport | Holden VF Commodore | 161 | +32.0 s | 13 | 120 |
| 16 | 15 | (Australia) Rick Kelly (Australia) David Russell | Nissan Motorsport | Nissan Altima L33 | 161 | +35.2 s | 19 | 114 |
| 17 | 62 | (Australia) Aaren Russell (Australia) Drew Russell | Novocastrian Motorsport | Holden VF Commodore | 161 | +43.6 s | 24 | 108 |
| 18 | 1 | (Australia) Jamie Whincup (Australia) Paul Dumbrell | Triple Eight Race Engineering | Holden VF Commodore | 161 | +1:02.0 | 8 | 102 |
| 19 | 222 | (Australia) Nick Percat (United Kingdom) Oliver Gavin | Lucas Dumbrell Motorsport | Holden VF Commodore | 159 | +2 Laps | 21 | 96 |
| 20 | 7 | (Australia) Todd Kelly (United Kingdom) Alex Buncombe | Nissan Motorsport | Nissan Altima L33 | 156 | +5 Laps | 16 | 90 |
| 21 | 200 | (Australia) Renee Gracie (Switzerland) Simona de Silvestro | Prodrive Racing Australia | Ford FG X Falcon | 121 | +40 Laps | 25 | 96 |
| Ret | 17 | (Australia) Scott Pye (Australia) Marcos Ambrose | DJR Team Penske | Ford FG X Falcon | 137 | Accident | 7 | |
| Ret | 4 | (Australia) Ashley Walsh (Australia) Jack Le Brocq | Erebus Motorsport | Mercedes-Benz E63 AMG | 135 | Accident | 26 | |
| Ret | 3 | (Australia) Tim Blanchard (Australia) Karl Reindler | Lucas Dumbrell Motorsport | Holden VF Commodore | 78 | Accident | 23 | |
| Ret | 111 | (New Zealand) Andre Heimgartner (New Zealand) Ant Pedersen | Super Black Racing | Ford FG X Falcon | 35 | Accident | 12 | |
| Ret | 34 | (Australia) David Wall (New Zealand) (Chris Pither) | Garry Rogers Motorsport | Volvo S60 | 15 | Engine | 20 | |
| DNS | 6 | (Australia) Chaz Mostert (Australia) Cam Waters | Prodrive Racing Australia | Ford FG X Falcon | | Withdrawn | | |

=== Notes ===
- Chris Pither did not drive car No. 34 during the race.
- The fastest lap of the race was recorded by Car No. 1 (Red Bull Racing Australia, J.Whincup/P.Dumbrell, Holden Commodore VF) at 2:07.1226, a new lap record.

== Broadcast ==
From 2015 onwards, V8 Supercars began producing its own television package and selling it to external rights holders. Having been exclusively on the Seven Network from 2007 to 2014, V8 Supercars signed a AU$241 million deal to broadcast all events on cable provider Fox Sports Australia (via channel 506) from 2015, with six 'marquee' events – including Bathurst – concurrently shown free-to-air on Network 10. Unlike other Fox-broadcast V8 Supercar events in 2015, the Bathurst 1000 included ad breaks.

| Fox Sports | Network 10 |
|---|---|
| Host: Jessica Yates, Russell Ingall, Mark Skaife; Booth: Neil Crompton, Chad Neylon (ad-breaks), Greg Rust; Pit-lane: Riana Crehan, Paul Morris, Greg Murphy | Presenter: Matthew White; Pundits: Rick Kelly, Mark Larkham; Roving: Scott MacKinnon, Kate Peck |
