= 2006 Australian Production Car Championship =

The 2006 Australian Production Car Championship was a CAMS sanctioned motor racing title for drivers of Group 3E Series Production Cars. The championship, which was administered by the Production Car Association of Australia, was the 13th Australian Production Car Championship.

The championship was won by David Ryan driving a Ford BF Falcon XR6 Turbo.

== Calendar ==
The title was contested over a seven-round series with three races per round.

- Round 1, Wakefield Park Raceway, New South Wales, 4 & 5 March
- Round 2, Symmons Plains International Raceway, Tasmania, 8 & 9 April
- Round 3, Oran Park Raceway, New South Wales, 6 & 7 May
- Round 4, Eastern Creek International Raceway, New South Wales, 8 & 9 July
- Round 5, Phillip Island Grand Prix Circuit, Victoria, 19 & 20 August
- Round 6, Queensland Raceway, Ipswich, Queensland, 3 September
- Round 7, Oran Park Raceway, New South Wales, 28 & 29 October

Race 1 at each round employed a massed start with Races 2 & 3 each utilising a handicap start.

== Class Structure ==
Cars competed in three classes, designated A, B & C, as per the published Vehicle Eligibility Schedule. Additional entries competed in the Trophy Class, these being cars with a record of competition in the championship, but not included on the 2006 eligibility list. Drivers of Trophy Class cars were not eligible to score championship points.

== Points system ==
Outright championship points were allocated on a 30-25-22-20-18-16-14-12-10-8-6-4-2-1 basis for the first 14 finishers in each handicap race. One point was awarded to all other finishers in these races.

Points towards the three class awards were allocated on a 30-25-22-20-18-16-14-12-10-8-6-4-2-1 basis to the first 14 finishers in each class in each race. One point was awarded to each of the other finishers in each race and three points were awarded to the fastest driver in each Class in qualifying at each round.

Trophy drivers were awarded points only to determine the highest placed competitor at each round. No outright pointscore was to be maintained for Trophy drivers.

== Results ==
Position	Driver	No.	Car	Entrant	Points
1	David Ryan	30	Ford BF Falcon XR6 Turbo	Shell / Joe Armour Auto	377
2	John Houlder	2	Ford BF Falcon XR8	In-Tune Motorsport	259
3	Nick Dunkley	12	Ford BF Falcon XR6 Turbo	Dayco / Wesfil Cooper	228
4	Colin Osborne	13	Toyota Celica SX	Osborne Motorsport	202
5	Leigh Mertens	7	Holden VZ Commodore SSZ	RHM Group P/L	195
6	Darren Best	76	Ford Focus ST170	Best Racing	153
7	Steve Briffa	8	Holden VZ Commodore SSZ	Time Mutual Finance Corp	141
8	Chris Delfsma	21	Ford BF Falcon XR8	Century 21 Hazelbrook	118
9	Drew Russell	28	Honda S2000	Go - Karts - Go	110
10	David Mertens	77	Proton Satria GTi	G+S Performance / Quadrant	98
11	Ric Shaw	35	Toyota Celica SX	Osborne Motorsport	77
12	Allan Shephard	27	Toyota Celica SX	Thrifty Car Rental	76
13	Trevor Keene	31	Toyota Celica SX	Osborne Motorsport	68
14	Amber Anderson	15	Toyota Echo Sportivo	Lauren Gray	48
15	Lauren Gray	15	Toyota Echo Sportivo	Carfresh / Kingsville Accident	46
16	Kosi Kalaitzidis	6	Volkswagen Golf GTi	Barloworld Volkswagen	42
17	Darren Harris	93	Proton Satria GTi	DJ Embroidery and Promotional	12
Class A
1	David Ryan	30	Ford BF Falcon XR6 Turbo	Shell / Joe Armour Auto	606
2	John Houlder	2	Ford BF Falcon XR8	In-Tune Motorsport	446
3	Nick Dunkley	12	Ford BF Falcon XR6 Turbo	Dayco / Wesfil Cooper	411
4	Leigh Mertens	7	Holden VZ Commodore SSZ	RHM Group P/L	346
5	Steve Briffa	8	Holden VZ Commodore SSZ	Time Mutual Finance Corp	280
6	Chris Delfsma	21	Ford BF Falcon XR8	Century 21 Hazelbrook	266
7	Drew Russell	28	Honda S2000	Go - Karts - Go	175
Class B
1	Colin Osborne	13	Toyota Celica SX	Osborne Motorsport	492
2	Allan Shephard	27	Toyota Celica SX	Thrifty Car Rental	194
3	Trevor Keene	31	Toyota Celica SX	Osborne Motorsport	176
4	Ric Shaw	35	Toyota Celica SX	Osborne Motorsport	162
5	Kosi Kalaitzidis	6	Volkswagen Golf GTi	Barloworld Volkswagen	90
Class C
1	Darren Best	76	Ford Focus ST170	Best Racing	417
2	David Mertens	77	Proton Satria GTi	G+S Performance / Quadrant	279
3	Lauren Gray	15	Toyota Echo Sportivo	Carfresh / Kingsville Accident	150
4	Amber Anderson	15	Toyota Echo Sportivo	Lauren Gray	144
5	Darren Harris	93	Proton Satria GTi	DJ Embroidery and Promotional	66
