= 2015 Sydney Motorsport Park Super Sprint =

2015 V8 Supercar championship race

(New South Wales) 2015 Sydney Motorsport Park Super Sprint
Event Information
- Round 8 of 14 in the 2015 International V8 Supercars Championship
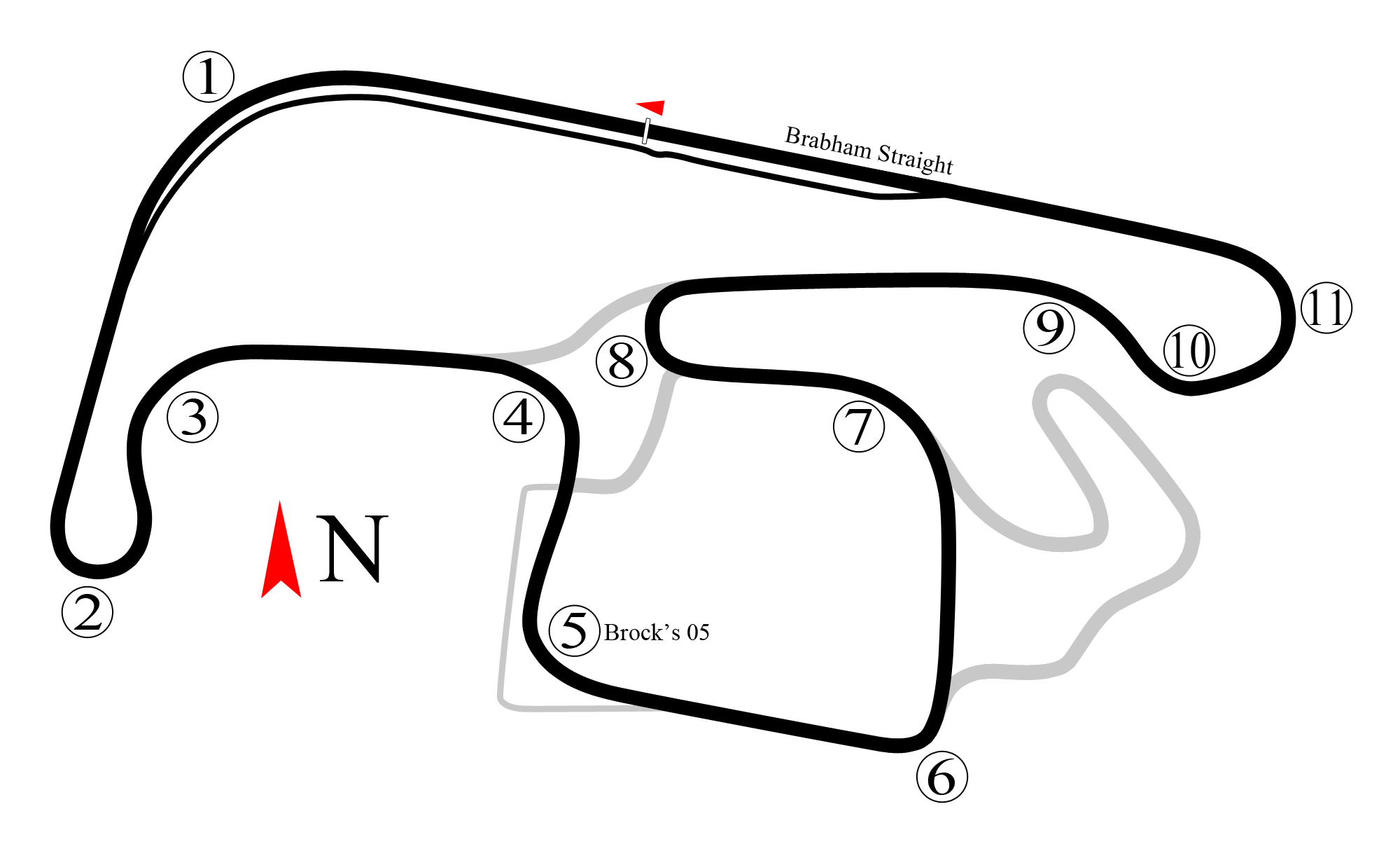
- Date: 21–23 August 2015
- Location: Eastern Creek, New South Wales
- Venue: Sydney Motorsport Park
- Weather: Fine on Saturday, rain on Sunday

Results
Race 1
Distance	16 laps	60 km
Pole position	Chaz Mostert; Prodrive Racing Australia	1:30.0837
Winner	Chaz Mostert; Prodrive Racing Australia	24:49.1655
Race 2
Distance	16 laps	60 km
Pole position	Chaz Mostert; Prodrive Racing Australia	1:28.9583
Winner	Jamie Whincup; Triple Eight Race Engineering	24:45.9934
Race 3
Distance	50 laps	197 km
Pole position	Scott McLaughlin; Garry Rogers Motorsport	1:30.1669
Winner	Chaz Mostert; Prodrive Racing Australia	1:28:29.5693

The 2015 Sydney Motorsport Park Super Sprint was a motor race for V8 Supercars held on the weekend of 21–23 August 2015. The event was held at the Sydney Motorsport Park in Sydney, New South Wales, and consisted of two sprint races, each over a distance of 60 kilometres (37 miles) and one endurance race over a distance of 200 kilometres (124 miles). It was the eighth round of fourteen in the 2015 International V8 Supercars Championship. Prior to the start of the race James Courtney withdrew due to sustaining a chest injury, two broken ribs and a punctured lung, when hit by a section of metal advertising board thrown through the air by down draught from a Royal Australian Navy helicopter.

== Championship Standings ==
Drivers' Championship standings

Pos.	Driver	Points
1	(Australia) Mark Winterbottom	1915
2	(Australia) Chaz Mostert	1741
3	(Australia) Craig Lowndes	1660
4	(Australia) David Reynolds	1633
5	(New Zealand) Fabian Coulthard	1580

Teams' Championship standings

Pos.	Constructor	Points
1	Prodrive Racing Australia	3656
2	Triple Eight Race Engineering	3136
3	Holden Racing Team	2927
4	Brad Jones Racing	2702
5	Nissan Motorsport (7/15)	2105

- Note: Only the top five positions are included for both sets of standings.
