= Ashley Cooper (racing driver) =

Australian racing driver

- Nationality: Australian
- Born: 11 July 1980 Sydney, New South Wales, Australia
- Died: 25 February 2008 (aged 27) Adelaide, South Australia, Australia

Fujitsu V8 Supercar Series
- Years active: 2007–2008
- Teams: Sydney Star Racing; Capital Finance
- Starts: 8

Previous series
- 2005 2006: Commodore Cup; V8 Utes

Ashley Alan Cooper (11 July 1980 – 25 February 2008) was an Australian race car driver. Cooper died from severe head and internal injuries after a high-speed racing accident. Preliminary investigation suggests that his car may have hit the concrete barrier at over 200 kilometres per hour (120 mph) at the Clipsal 500 meeting in Adelaide.

== Career ==
Cooper began his racing career in 1998 driving Holden HQ sedans. Leading the 2005 Commodore Cup championship for most of the year, Cooper finished fourth at the final round at Eastern Creek Raceway. In 2006, Cooper was crowned V8 Utes Rookie of the Year. He competed in three rounds of the 2007 Fujitsu V8 Supercar Series, with a top-15 finish at Queensland Raceway.

== Death ==
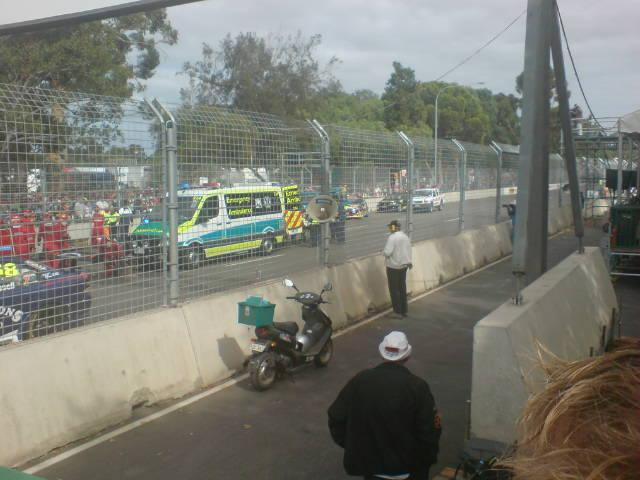
Cooper being loaded into the Ambulance

Cooper suffered severe head and internal injuries after crashing his Holden VZ Commodore into a concrete barrier at over 200 km/h (120 mph) during the Fujitsu V8 Supercars Series race at the Clipsal 500 in Adelaide on 23 February 2008.

Cooper had been given emergency medical treatment trackside from medical teams, including Dr Bill Griggs, who performed a tracheotomy to assist with Cooper's breathing. Cooper was taken to the Royal Adelaide Hospital by ambulance and was put on life support. He died two days later, at the age of 27. A registered organ donor, Cooper's heart, lungs, kidneys, pancreas and liver have been donated to seven people, including a six-year-old child.
