= Novocastrian Motorsport =

Australian car racing team 1994 - 2017

- Manufacturer: Holden
- Team Principal: Wayne Russell
- Race Drivers: 62. Aaren Russell
- Chassis: Holden VF Commodore
- Debut: 1994
- Drivers' Championships: 0
- Round wins: 0
- 2015 position: 0
- 17th (108 points)

Novocastrian Motorsport is an Australian motor racing team based in Newcastle, New South Wales. The team has competed in domestic touring car and production car competitions.

== History ==
=== Privateer entry ===
The team made its competition debut at the 1994 Bathurst 1000, with owner Wayne Russell and Bernie Gillon driving a Holden Commodore VL. The car retired after 71 laps with a well-publicised crash at Griffins Bend. Russell entered the car in the next season of the Australian Touring Car Championship, entering 5 of the 10 rounds that season. He finished a best of 14th at both Phillip Island and the final race at Oran Park. The car finished 15th and the last classified car at the hands of Russell and Ric Shaw at the 1995 Bathurst 1000, despite coming home 32 laps down.

Now in a VP Commodore, Russell entered 4 rounds plus Bathurst in 1996 - Eastern Creek, Bathurst (sprint), Mallala and Oran Park. He managed a best result of 13th in race one at Mallala. The same combination as the previous year only managed 4 laps in the wet 1996 Bathurst 1000 before John Trimbole crashed into Russell behind the safety car. 1997 began the teams' decline, with entry for only three events (Sandown, Eastern Creek and Oran Park) and cracking the top 20 once all season. Russell and Shaw's final Bathurst appearance ended in a tangle with Kevin Heffernan at the Chase on lap 126. A diminishing budget led to entry for only two rounds in 1998, at Phillip Island and Mallala respectively before the team moved to production car racing, running BMW Z3s.

=== Development Series ===
Novocastrian Motorsport re-surfaced in the Development Series in 2007 with Wayne's son Drew running a Holden VX Commodore. The team over the course of the next few seasons began the long climb up the grid, which was boosted by the introduction of a second car for Drew's brother Aaren in 2010, with the team also switching over to a pair of ex-Brad Jones Racing Ford BF Falcons. 2010 saw both brothers finish inside the top 10 in the championship, despite a heavy crash for Drew at Bathurst.

The team began to regularly challenge the established runners in the top 10, while also providing support for a third car run by privateer Michael Hector. Drew scored the team's best ever result with a second place at Queensland Raceway in 2013 before the budgetary constraints led to him giving up his seat as the team downsized to the one car for Aaren. Aaren subsequently endured his - and the teams' - best season with three podiums and seventh overall in the championship before the team's final DVS season in 2015. The sole podium at the opening round in Adelaide was all the team had to show before the team's focus shifted to moving back up into the top tier of Australian touring car racing.

=== V8 Supercars ===
With the backing of gym chain Plus Fitness, Novocastrian Motorsport made its return to V8 Supercars with a wildcard entry in the 2015 Bathurst 1000 with a Garry Rogers Motorsport-built Holden Commodore VF leased from Dragon Motor Racing. The entry managed to stay on the lead lap throughout the race, resulting in a 17th-place finish. With the support of Plus Fitness, the team took a 50% stake in the second Erebus Motorsport entry before the 2016 season, enabling Aaren to participate in the championship full-time. Despite Aaren's consistent results amid a steep learning curve, conflicting interests between the team and Plus Fitness saw the outfit's contract terminated after the 2016 Townsville 500, with Craig Baird (and later Shae Davies) taking over the #4. Aaren returned with André Heimgartner and the Lucas Dumbrell Motorsport team for the 2016 Enduro Cup.

Having attempted to get the team on the main-game grid for 2017, Aaren ultimately contested six events of the season – including the series' inaugural event in Newcastle – with LDM. The team planned to purchase the #3 Racing Entitlements Contract from LDM at the conclusion of 2017, however sufficient funding could not be found and the team disappeared from the grid.

=== Later years ===
Wayne Russell attempted to start a low-cost Toyota 86-based championship aimed at karting graduates in 2020, before these plans were scuppered by COVID-19. The team then returned to production car racing in 2022; having originally planned to just enter the Bathurst 6 Hour, they entered the subsequent rounds of the 2022 Australian Production Car Series and came away with the title. The team last competed at the 2023 Bathurst 6 Hour, finishing 2nd outright.

Wayne Russell died in December 2024 after a short battle with cancer, aged 62.

== ATCC/V8 Supercar drivers ==
The following is a list of drivers who have driven for the team in V8 Supercars, in order of their first appearance. Drivers who only drove for the team on a part-time basis are listed in italics.

- (Australia) Wayne Russell (1994–1998)
- (New Zealand) Bernie Gillon (1994)
- (Australia) Ric Shaw (1995–1997)
- (Australia) Aaren Russell (2015)
- (Australia) Drew Russell (2015)

== Super2 drivers ==
The following is a list of drivers who have driven for the team in Super2, in order of their first appearance.

- (Australia) Drew Russell (2007–2013)
- (Australia) Aaren Russell (2010–2014)
- (Australia) Michael Hector (2012–2013)

== Results ==
=== Complete Bathurst 1000 results ===
Year	No.	Car	Drivers	Position	Laps
1994	62	Holden Commodore VL	(Australia) Wayne Russell (New Zealand) Bernie Gillon	DNF	71
1995	62	Holden Commodore VP	(Australia) Wayne Russell (Australia) Ric Shaw	15th	129
1996	62	Holden Commodore VP	(Australia) Wayne Russell (Australia) Ric Shaw	DNF	4
1997	62	Holden Commodore VS	(Australia) Wayne Russell (Australia) Ric Shaw	DNF	126
2015	62	Holden Commodore VF	(Australia) Aaren Russell (Australia) Drew Russell	17th	161

=== Complete Bathurst 6 Hour results ===
Year	No.	Car	Drivers	Class	Ovr. Pos.	Laps	Cla. Pos.
2022	58	BMW M3 (F80)	(Australia) Aaren Russell (Australia) Drew Russell (Australia) Wayne Russell	X	5th	129	4th
2023	58	BMW M3 (F80)	(Australia) Aaren Russell (Australia) Drew Russell (Australia) Wayne Russell	X	2nd	112	2nd
