= 2013 Supercheap Auto Bathurst 1000 =

Motor race in Australia

Seasons
- ← 2012 2014 →

(New South Wales) 2013 Supercheap Auto Bathurst 1000
Event Information
- Round 11 of 14 in the 2013 International V8 Supercars Championship
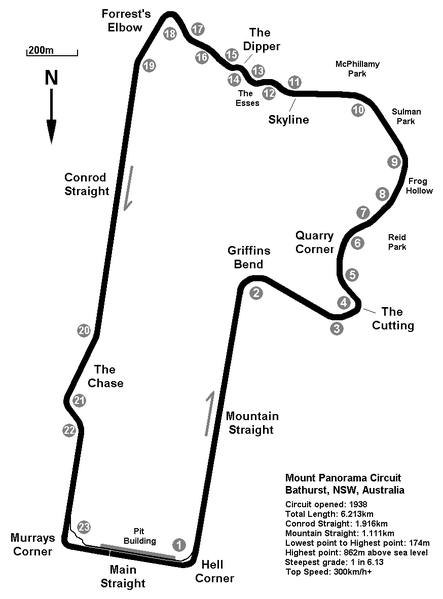
- Date: 10–13 October 2013
- Location: Bathurst, New South Wales
- Venue: Mount Panorama Circuit
- Weather: Fine, overcast late Sunday

Results
Race 1
Distance	161 laps	1000 km
Pole position	Jamie Whincup; Triple Eight Race Engineering	2:07.8825
Winner	Mark Winterbottom; Steven Richards; Ford Performance Racing	6:11:27.9315

The 2013 Supercheap Auto Bathurst 1000 was an Australian touring car motor race for V8 Supercars, the twenty-ninth race of the 2013 International V8 Supercars Championship. It was held on 13 October 2013 at the Mount Panorama Circuit in Bathurst, New South Wales.

Mark Winterbottom and Steven Richards won the race for Ford Performance Racing, ahead of the pole-sitting Triple Eight Race Engineering car of Jamie Whincup and Paul Dumbrell and their team-mates Craig Lowndes and Warren Luff. The winning race time of six hours, eleven minutes and 27.9 seconds was a new record for a full 1,000-kilometre event, beating the previous record set in 2010 by 84 seconds. Along with the 2010 race, it was the second to be covered at an average speed of over 160 kilometres per hour (100 mph).

== Background ==
The 2013 race was the seventeenth running of the Australian 1000 race, which was first held after the organisational split between the Australian Racing Drivers Club and V8 Supercars Australia that saw two "Bathurst 1000" races contested in both 1997 and 1998, with one race open to V8 Supercar entries, and the other open to Super Touring cars. The 2013 race was also the 56th race for which the lineage can be traced back to the 1960 Armstrong 500 – held at Phillip Island – and the 53rd to be held at Mount Panorama.

=== Entry list ===
With the addition of teams entering Mercedes-Benzes and Nissans it was the first time since 1998 that cars other than Fords of Holdens had entered the race. The four Nissan Altimas entered by Nissan Motorsport were the first Nissans to compete in the race since the 1998 AMP Bathurst 1000. The three Mercedes-Benz E63 AMGs entered by Erebus Motorsport were the first Mercedes-Benzes to race since the 1994 Tooheys 1000.

In addition to the twenty eight regular championship entries, one wildcard entry was accepted for the 2013 race, with Triple Eight Race Engineering providing an extra car for British driver Andy Priaulx and Swedish driver Mattias Ekström to drive under the banner of Xbox One Racing. Dick Johnson Racing ran a special livery on the car of Chaz Mostert and Dale Wood in commemoration of thirty years since Dick Johnson drove the Greens-Tuf XE Falcon, which he famously crashed in the Top 10 Shootout in 1983. The two Dick Johnson Racing cars also swapped numbers for the event, with Mostert and Wood using 17 while Tim Blanchard and Ashley Walsh used 12. The Nissan Altima of Michael Caruso and Daniel Gaunt also had a number change, using 300 in relation to the A$300,000 donation to the charity Beyond Blue by Symantec (the parent company of the team's major sponsor Norton). Garry Rogers Motorsport also ran a special livery on the car of Scott McLaughlin and Jack Perkins in celebration of the team's fiftieth year in motor racing, while Britek Motorsport ran a pink livery in support of the McGrath Foundation. Danish driver Allan Simonsen had been set to race for Britek alongside David Wall, however his death at Le Mans four months earlier saw him replaced with New Zealander Chris Pither.

The Triple Eight Race Engineering drivers Jamie Whincup and Paul Dumbrell were the defending race winners.

No.	Drivers	Team (Sponsor)	Car	No.	Drivers	Team (Sponsor)	Car
1	(Australia) Jamie Whincup (Australia) Paul Dumbrell	Triple Eight Race Engineering (Red Bull)	Holden Commodore VF	19	(Australia) Jonathon Webb (Germany) Marc Lieb	Tekno Autosports (Darrell Lea)	Holden Commodore VF
2	(Australia) Garth Tander (Australia) Nick Percat	Holden Racing Team (Holden, Toll)	Holden Commodore VF	21	(Australia) David Wall (New Zealand) Chris Pither	Britek Motorsport (Wilson Security, McGrath Foundation)	Holden Commodore VF
3	(Australia) Tony D'Alberto (New Zealand) Jonny Reid	Tony D'Alberto Racing (Hiflex Hydraulic Hoses)	Holden Commodore VF	22	(Australia) James Courtney (New Zealand) Greg Murphy	Holden Racing Team (Holden, Toll)	Holden Commodore VF
4	(Australia) Lee Holdsworth (New Zealand) Craig Baird	Erebus Motorsport (Irwin Tools)	Mercedes-Benz E63 AMG	33	(New Zealand) Scott McLaughlin (Australia) Jack Perkins	Garry Rogers Motorsport (Fujitsu)	Holden Commodore VF
5	(Australia) Mark Winterbottom (New Zealand) Steven Richards	Ford Performance Racing (Pepsi Max)	Ford Falcon FG	34	(France) Alexandre Prémat (Australia) Greg Ritter	Garry Rogers Motorsport (Fujitsu)	Holden Commodore VF
6	(Australia) Will Davison (Australia) Steve Owen	Ford Performance Racing (Pepsi Max)	Ford Falcon FG	47	(Australia) Tim Slade (Australia) Andrew Thompson	James Rosenberg Racing (Heavy Haulage Australia)	Mercedes-Benz E63 AMG
7	(Australia) Todd Kelly (Australia) David Russell	Nissan Motorsport (Jack Daniel's)	Nissan Altima L33	55	(Australia) David Reynolds (Australia) Dean Canto	Rod Nash Racing (The Bottle-O)	Ford Falcon FG
8	(Australia) Jason Bright (Australia) Andrew Jones	Brad Jones Racing (BOC Gas and Gear)	Holden Commodore VF	66	(Australia) Russell Ingall (Australia) Ryan Briscoe	Walkinshaw Racing (Supercheap Auto)	Holden Commodore VF
9	(Germany) Maro Engel (Australia) Steve Johnson	Erebus Motorsport (SP Tools)	Mercedes-Benz E63 AMG	80	(Australia) Scott Pye (Australia) Paul Morris	Lucas Dumbrell Motorsport (Sargent Security)	Holden Commodore VF
10	(United Kingdom) Andy Priaulx (Sweden) Mattias Ekström	Triple Eight Race Engineering (Xbox One)	Holden Commodore VF	88	(Australia) Dean Fiore (New Zealand) Matt Halliday	Lucas Dumbrell Motorsport (Dodo Insurance)	Holden Commodore VF
12	(Australia) Tim Blanchard (Australia) Ashley Walsh	Dick Johnson Racing (ADVAM)	Ford Falcon FG	97	(New Zealand) Shane van Gisbergen (Netherlands) Jeroen Bleekemolen	Tekno Autosports (VIP Petfoods)	Holden Commodore VF
14	(New Zealand) Fabian Coulthard (Australia) Luke Youlden	Brad Jones Racing (Lockwood)	Holden Commodore VF	300	(Australia) Michael Caruso (New Zealand) Daniel Gaunt	Nissan Motorsport (Norton AntiVirus)	Nissan Altima L33
15	(Australia) Rick Kelly (Australia) Karl Reindler	Nissan Motorsport (Jack Daniel's)	Nissan Altima L33	360	(Australia) James Moffat (Australia) Taz Douglas	Nissan Motorsport (Norton AntiVirus)	Nissan Altima L33
17	(Australia) Chaz Mostert (Australia) Dale Wood	Dick Johnson Racing (Wilson Security)	Ford Falcon FG	888	(Australia) Craig Lowndes (Australia) Warren Luff	Triple Eight Race Engineering (Red Bull)	Holden Commodore VF
18	(Australia) Alex Davison (New Zealand) John McIntyre	Team 18 (Jeld-Wen)	Ford Falcon FG				

*Entries with a grey background were wildcard entries which did not compete in the full championship season.

== Report ==
=== Free Practice ===
The first free practice session took place on the Thursday morning prior to the race with a duration of fifty minutes. The session was open to both championship drivers and co-drivers. Craig Lowndes set the fastest time during the session, ahead of Mark Winterbottom and Jason Bright. The second free practice session, held on Thursday afternoon, was only open to co-drivers and was forty-five minutes in length. Winterbottom's co-driver Steven Richards topped the session ahead of the Triple Eight Race Engineering co-drivers Paul Dumbrell and Warren Luff. The Mercedes-Benz E63 AMG of Andrew Thompson suffered damage after a brake line was severed by debris, causing Thompson to hit the wall at the Chase. The third free practice session was held later on Thursday, this time a one-hour-long session open to all drivers. Reigning Bathurst winner Jamie Whincup was quickest, three-quarters of a second faster than Winterbottom with David Reynolds in third. Tim Slade caused a red flag when he crashed heavily at the Cutting, damaging the car that Thompson had crashed in the previous session enough that it would not be able to take part in qualifying on Friday afternoon. Alex Davison also crashed at Reid Park, causing significant damage to the side of his car but it was repaired in time for the following day's sessions.

The fourth free practice session, a forty-five-minute session held on Friday morning, was again only open to co-drivers. Luff and Dumbrell finished ahead of the Bathurst rookie, Swede Mattias Ekström, driving the wildcard entry run by Triple Eight. The fifth free practice session was held later on Friday morning, with Whincup going fastest ahead of Bright and Will Davison. Chaz Mostert had a major accident a Reid Park, which eventually ruled the car out of qualifying. The sixth and final free practice session was held on Saturday morning for all drivers. Reynolds finished the session fastest ahead of Whincup and Fabian Coulthard. The cars of Slade and Thompson and Mostert and Dale Wood returned to the track in this session after being heavily damaged in their respective crashes on Thursday and Friday.

Summary

Session	Time	No.	Driver	Team	Entrant	Car	Fastest lap	Weather
Thursday
Practice 1	10:20	888	Craig Lowndes	Red Bull Racing Australia	Triple Eight Race Engineering	Holden VF Commodore	2:10.1021	Dry, sunny
Practice 2	13:15	5	Steven Richards	Pepsi Max Crew	Ford Performance Racing	Ford FG Falcon	2:10.5531	Dry, sunny
Practice 3	15:35	1	Jamie Whincup	Red Bull Racing Australia	Triple Eight Race Engineering	Holden VF Commodore	2:08.3240	Dry, sunny
Friday
Practice 4	09:40	888	Warren Luff	Red Bull Racing Australia	Triple Eight Race Engineering	Holden VF Commodore	2:08.4794	Dry, sunny
Practice 5	11:05	1	Jamie Whincup	Red Bull Racing Australia	Triple Eight Race Engineering	Holden VF Commodore	2:07.8226	Dry, sunny
Saturday
Practice 6	10:05	55	David Reynolds	Bottle-O Racing Team	Rod Nash Racing	Ford FG Falcon	2:08.6838	Dry, sunny

=== Qualifying ===
The forty-minute qualifying session took place on Friday afternoon. The session would set positions eleven to twenty-nine on the grid, with the top ten drivers advancing to the Top 10 Shootout held on Saturday afternoon. Only twenty-seven cars took part in the session, with the cars of Tim Slade and Andrew Thompson and Chaz Mostert and Dale Wood not able to be repaired in time for the session following their practice crashes. Steven Johnson qualified the #9 Erebus Motorsport Mercedes-Benz instead of regular driver Maro Engel due to his higher level of experience at the circuit.

David Reynolds led the early part of the session while several drivers went off at the Chase, including Jamie Whincup, Jason Bright and Michael Caruso. Whincup also hit the wall coming out of the Dipper but did not sustain any significant damage and no repairs were required. Whincup went on to post the fastest time, six one-hundredths of a second quicker than Mark Winterbottom. Bright, James Courtney, Shane van Gisbergen, Craig Lowndes, Will Davison, Reynolds, Scott McLaughlin and Alexandre Prémat completed the top ten, with McLaughlin and Prémat both making the Top 10 Shootout in their first qualifying attempt for the race.

Garth Tander and Lee Holdsworth, in eleventh and twelfth respectively, were knocked out of the top ten in the final moments of qualifying. They were followed by David Wall, Fabian Coulthard, Tony D'Alberto, Johnson, Caruso, rookie Mattias Ekström, James Moffat and Jonathon Webb, who completed the top twenty. The final seven positions in qualifying were taken by Tim Blanchard, Scott Pye, Todd Kelly, Rick Kelly, Russell Ingall, Alex Davison and Dean Fiore, who was just over one and a half seconds slower than Whincup's time. Despite missing qualifying, the Slade/Thompson and Mostert/Wood cars were allowed to take part in the race by the stewards.

=== Top 10 Shootout ===
The Top 10 Shootout took place later in the afternoon than in previous years, beginning at 17:00 local time. David Reynolds said that the starting time was unfair, claiming that the track is faster at the end of the hour-long session than it is at the start, thus giving the final runners an advantage. Alexandre Prémat, the first driver to take to the circuit, struggled for grip and recorded a 2:10.4145. His team-mate Scott McLaughlin then bettered his time by just over a second. Reynolds ran slightly wide at turn two and was unable to match McLaughlin's time, just five one-hundredths of a second behind. Will Davison went two-tenths of a second quicker than McLaughlin, setting a 2:09.0023, before Craig Lowndes improved on this time by half a tenth with a seemingly good lap.

Shane van Gisbergen was next to set a time and he beat Lowndes' lap by nearly seven-tenths of a second with a 2:08.2804, despite getting sideways going into the Dipper. James Courtney had a moment at the Cutting, costing him a lot of time in the first sector and he only just went quicker than Lowndes. Jason Bright then went four one-thousandths of a second faster than Van Gisbergen to be the fastest runner with two drivers still to set a lap time. Mark Winterbottom went two-tenths quicker than Bright but this was not enough to stop the final driver, Jamie Whincup, from taking pole with a time of 2:07.8825, another two-tenths quicker than Winterbottom.

==== Final starting grid ====
The following table represents the final starting grid for the race on Sunday:

Inside row			Outside row		
1	(Australia) Jamie Whincup (Australia) Paul Dumbrell	1	5	(Australia) Mark Winterbottom (New Zealand) Steven Richards	2
1	Triple Eight Race Engineering (Holden Commodore VF)		Ford Performance Racing (Ford Falcon FG)		2
3	(Australia) Jason Bright (Australia) Andrew Jones	8	97	(New Zealand) Shane van Gisbergen (Netherlands) Jeroen Bleekemolen	4
3	Brad Jones Racing (Holden Commodore VF)		Tekno Autosports (Holden Commodore VF)		4
5	(Australia) James Courtney (New Zealand) Greg Murphy	22	888	(Australia) Craig Lowndes (Australia) Warren Luff	6
5	Holden Racing Team (Holden Commodore VF)		Triple Eight Race Engineering (Holden Commodore VF)		6
7	(Australia) Will Davison (Australia) Steve Owen	6	33	(New Zealand) Scott McLaughlin (Australia) Jack Perkins	8
7	Ford Performance Racing (Ford Falcon FG)		Garry Rogers Motorsport (Holden Commodore VF)		8
9	(Australia) David Reynolds (Australia) Dean Canto	55	34	(France) Alexandre Prémat (Australia) Greg Ritter	10
9	Rod Nash Racing (Ford Falcon FG)		Garry Rogers Motorsport (Holden Commodore VF)		10
11	(Australia) Garth Tander (Australia) Nick Percat	2	4	(Australia) Lee Holdsworth (New Zealand) Craig Baird	12
11	Holden Racing Team (Holden Commodore VF)		Erebus Motorsport (Mercedes-Benz E63 AMG)		12
13	(Australia) David Wall (New Zealand) Chris Pither	21	14	(New Zealand) Fabian Coulthard (Australia) Luke Youlden	14
13	Britek Motorsport (Holden Commodore VF)		Brad Jones Racing (Holden Commodore VF)		14
15	(Australia) Tony D'Alberto (New Zealand) Jonny Reid	3	9	(Germany) Maro Engel (Australia) Steven Johnson	16
15	Tony D'Alberto Racing (Holden Commodore VF)		Erebus Motorsport (Mercedes-Benz E63 AMG)		16
17	(Australia) Michael Caruso (New Zealand) Daniel Gaunt	300	10	(United Kingdom) Andy Priaulx (Sweden) Mattias Ekström	18
17	Nissan Motorsport (Nissan Altima L33)		Triple Eight Race Engineering (Holden Commodore VF)		18
19	(Australia) James Moffat (Australia) Taz Douglas	360	19	(Australia) Jonathon Webb (Germany) Marc Lieb	20
19	Nissan Motorsport (Nissan Altima L33)		Tekno Autosports (Holden Commodore VF)		20
21	(Australia) Tim Blanchard (Australia) Ashley Walsh	12	80	(Australia) Scott Pye (Australia) Paul Morris	22
21	Dick Johnson Racing (Ford Falcon FG)		Lucas Dumbrell Motorsport (Holden Commodore VF)		22
23	(Australia) Todd Kelly (Australia) David Russell	7	15	(Australia) Rick Kelly (Australia) Karl Reindler	24
23	Nissan Motorsport (Nissan Altima L33)		Nissan Motorsport (Nissan Altima L33)		24
25	(Australia) Russell Ingall (Australia) Ryan Briscoe	66	18	(Australia) Alex Davison (New Zealand) John McIntyre	26
25	Walkinshaw Racing (Holden Commodore VF)		Charlie Schwerkolt Racing (Ford Falcon FG)		26
27	(Australia) Dean Fiore (New Zealand) Matthew Halliday	88	17	(Australia) Chaz Mostert (Australia) Dale Wood	28
27	Lucas Dumbrell Motorsport (Holden Commodore VF)		Dick Johnson Racing (Ford Falcon FG)		28
29	(Australia) Tim Slade (Australia) Andrew Thompson	47			
29	James Rosenberg Racing (Mercedes-Benz E63 AMG)				

=== Race ===
The race began at 10:30 local time. The cars of Dale Wood, driving with Chaz Mostert, and Andrew Thompson, driving with Tim Slade, entered the pit lane at the end of the warm-up lap to refuel, thus giving them a more flexible strategy for the race. However, the car of Mostert and Wood was given a pit lane drive-through penalty for not being jacked up while refuelling was taking place, though Mostert later claimed he saw the car up on the jacks.

Meanwhile, Paul Dumbrell had made a good start from pole while Mark Winterbottom bogged down and dropped to the back of the top ten. David Reynolds also dropped back after being forced wide at Griffins Bend on the opening lap. Dumbrell led from Jason Bright, Shane van Gisbergen, Greg Murphy, Scott McLaughlin, Warren Luff, Will Davison, Mark Winterbottom, Garth Tander and Fabian Coulthard. The two Ford Performance Racing cars of Winterbottom and Davison started to make their way forwards during the first stint. Drivers began to pit on lap 11, with Luff, Greg Ritter, Russell Ingall, Maro Engel and Matt Halliday all making a pit stop. Van Gisbergen passed Bright on lap 12 and began to pull away from him but could not catch Dumbrell, who was pulling away from the field. The first driver change occurred on lap 15, with Will Davison pitting and handing the car over to Steve Owen.

The first safety car period was called on lap 21 to clear debris after David Russell hit a kangaroo coming out of Griffins Bend. All of the leading cars pitted, with Dumbrell handing the car over to Jamie Whincup. The safety car pulled off the track at the end of lap 23, with Whincup leading from Steven Richards, Dean Canto, Luff, Owen, Luke Youlden, Ritter, James Courtney, Craig Baird and Jeroen Bleekemolen. The car of Ingall and Ryan Briscoe had made an extra pit stop during the safety car to be on an alternative strategy. Various cars were under investigation for weaving after the safety car lights went out, though no penalties were awarded. Following the safety car period, Whincup began to pull away from the field behind him, which consisted mostly of co-drivers. The car of Todd Kelly and David Russell was officially retired due to the damage caused by the incident with the kangaroo.

The next round of pit stops began on lap 34 with Ritter and Nick Percat pitting, while Luff and Owen followed on the next lap. The car of Coulthard and Youlden had a small power steering fluid leak but the problem was mended during a pit stop. Meanwhile, Whincup continued to pull away from Richards, though Alexandre Prémat was setting the fastest lap times after taking over from Ritter. Whincup pitted on lap 46, four laps after Richards. Lap 54 saw cars coming in to complete their third pit stops, with Will Davison taking over from Owen while Luff handed over to Lowndes on lap 55. By lap 67 all of the leaders had completed three pit stops. Steven Johnson had a problem with his cool suit which had frozen while Jonathon Webb lost the driver's side window on his car. Van Gisbergen endured a problem in his pit stop which caused him to go a lap down while Mostert had a similar delay with a starter motor problem. Tony D'Alberto's car was in the garage with a rear suspension problem.

With half of the race gone, Reynolds now led with an alternative fuel strategy which saw him pitting later than the other drivers. The safety car was called again on lap 85 after Murphy ran wide going into Reid Park and made heavy contact with the wall. This caught out Reynolds, who was unable to pit before being caught behind the safety car. Dumbrell, Percat, Mattias Ekström, Van Gisbergen and Alex Davison, who had gone off at the Chase, all took the opportunity to pit. The race was restarted on lap 89 with Richards leading from Will Davison, Luff, Dumbrell, Coulthard, Andrew Jones, Jack Perkins, Baird, Ritter and Ashley Walsh. Dumbrell went off at the Chase on lap 93, losing a place to Coulthard, before doing the same again on lap 97. He was pitted immediately to hand the car over to Whincup, who would drive to the end of the race. Lowndes had also taken over from Luff to drive to the finish. Richards pitted on lap 99 to hand over to Winterbottom. Jones and Perkins pitted on lap 101, handing over to Bright and McLaughlin respectively, who almost had a collision with the car of Tim Slade which was pushed out of the Erebus Motorsport garage (having had power steering problems) in front of them. At this stage, Whincup and Tander had completed six of their seven compulsory pit stops, one more than most others, but would be unable to get to the end without another two fuel stops. The car of Prémat and Ritter was given a mechanical black flag for leaking fuel due to a broken seal.

The penultimate round of pit stops began on lap 117 with Winterbottom and Lowndes pitting, followed by Whincup on lap 118 and Bright and Canto on lap 119. Michael Caruso's car had a major power steering leak, dropping fluid over the top section of the circuit. David Wall had a similar problem several laps later. Tander pitted on lap 126, leaving Ekström in the lead. Lowndes and Bright were battling for fifth position at this stage, going side by side around the final corner. Ekström pitted on lap 134, handing over to Andy Priaulx to finish the race. Winterbottom now led by just under two seconds over Whincup.

The car of Scott Pye and Paul Morris had used its fuel strategy to great effect to be in contention for a top five finish, with Morris pitting from third place on lap 138 to hand the car over to Pye. McLaughlin and Bright also pitted on this lap for the final time. Whincup pitted on lap 139, one lap before Winterbottom and Lowndes, who had hit the wall coming out of Forrests Elbow but did not damage the car. Tander was the final driver to pit on lap 145, leaving the order as Winterbottom, Whincup, Bright, Lowndes, Tander and Reynolds. Lowndes, Tander and Reynolds were far behind the leading trio but were the fastest drivers on the track, with Lowndes and Tander catching and pressuring Bright for third place and Reynolds closing in on the battle. The car of Dean Fiore and Matt Halliday had retired on lap 145 with gearbox problems.

Bright was able to defend Lowndes but this allowed Winterbottom and Whincup to build a lead. Tander got past Lowndes at Griffins Bend with a bold move up the inside and then set his sights on passing Bright. The two went side by side through the final corner, which allowed Lowndes to get a run on Tander and reclaim fourth place. However, Tander retook the position around the outside at Griffins Bend. On lap 157, Tander made a move at the Chase but he went in too deep, pushing Bright wide and allowing Lowndes into third place. Bright then ran wide at Griffins Bend, allowing Reynolds into fifth. However, a mistake in the previous pit stop had seen not enough fuel put into Reynolds' car and he was forced to pit on lap 159.

Meanwhile, the battle between Winterbottom and Whincup for the lead had been intensifying. Whincup began to push harder with two laps to go, dropping a wheel off the track coming out of the Chase on lap 160. On the final lap, Whincup drew alongside Winterbottom on the outside going into Griffins Bend and attempted to take the lead, but slid wide and lost ground. This gave Winterbottom a buffer, which he held for the rest of the lap to take the win, with Whincup under half a second behind. The victory was Winterbottom's first and Steven Richards' third. Lowndes held on for third ahead of Tander and Bright while Pye ended up sixth. Will Davison came home in seventh ahead of McLaughlin, Reynolds and Priaulx.

Van Gisbergen and Jonathon Webb were next, ahead of Alex Davison and Lee Holdsworth, who was the best of the Mercedes-Benzes in fourteenth. Tim Blanchard rounded out the top fifteen, followed by Coulthard, Ingall, Moffat, Rick Kelly and Engel, who was the first car a lap down. Mostert finished in twenty-first after a troublesome weekend, with Wall, Prémat, D'Alberto, Caruso and Slade the last of those who finished and all with assorted problems during the day.

== Classification ==
=== Qualifying ===
Position	No.	Drivers	Entry	Car	Lap time	Difference	Grid
1	1	(Australia) Jamie Whincup (Australia) Paul Dumbrell	Triple Eight Race Engineering	Holden VF Commodore	2:08.0054		Top; 10
2	5	(Australia) Mark Winterbottom (New Zealand) Steven Richards	Ford Performance Racing	Ford FG Falcon	2:08.0612	+0.0558	Top; 10
3	8	(Australia) Jason Bright (Australia) Andrew Jones	Brad Jones Racing	Holden VF Commodore	2:08.2184	+0.2130	Top; 10
4	22	(Australia) James Courtney (New Zealand) Greg Murphy	Holden Racing Team	Holden VF Commodore	2:08.2476	+0.2422	Top; 10
5	97	(New Zealand) Shane van Gisbergen (Netherlands) Jeroen Bleekemolen	Tekno Autosports	Holden VF Commodore	2:08.2824	+0.2770	Top; 10
6	888	(Australia) Craig Lowndes (Australia) Warren Luff	Triple Eight Race Engineering	Holden VF Commodore	2:08.4042	+0.3988	Top; 10
7	6	(Australia) Will Davison (Australia) Steve Owen	Ford Performance Racing	Ford FG Falcon	2:08.4451	+0.4397	Top; 10
8	55	(Australia) David Reynolds (Australia) Dean Canto	Rod Nash Racing	Ford FG Falcon	2:08.4475	+0.4421	Top; 10
9	33	(New Zealand) Scott McLaughlin (Australia) Jack Perkins	Garry Rogers Motorsport	Holden VF Commodore	2:08.5792	+0.5738	Top; 10
10	34	(France) Alexandre Prémat (Australia) Greg Ritter	Garry Rogers Motorsport	Holden VF Commodore	2:08.5900	+0.5846	Top; 10
11	2	(Australia) Garth Tander (Australia) Nick Percat	Holden Racing Team	Holden VF Commodore	2:08.6376	+0.6322	11
12	4	(Australia) Lee Holdsworth (New Zealand) Craig Baird	Erebus Motorsport	Mercedes-Benz E63 AMG	2:08.7156	+0.7102	12
13	21	(Australia) David Wall (New Zealand) Chris Pither	Britek Motorsport	Holden VF Commodore	2:08.8677	+0.8623	13
14	14	(New Zealand) Fabian Coulthard (Australia) Luke Youlden	Brad Jones Racing	Holden VF Commodore	2:08.8696	+0.8642	14
15	3	(Australia) Tony D'Alberto (New Zealand) Jonny Reid	Tony D'Alberto Racing	Holden VF Commodore	2:08.8834	+0.8780	15
16	9	(Australia) Steven Johnson (Germany) Maro Engel	Erebus Motorsport	Mercedes-Benz E63 AMG	2:08.9303	+0.9249	16
17	300	(Australia) Michael Caruso (New Zealand) Daniel Gaunt	Nissan Motorsport	Nissan Altima	2:08.9320	+0.9266	17
18	10	(Sweden) Mattias Ekström (United Kingdom) Andy Priaulx	Triple Eight Race Engineering	Holden VF Commodore	2:09.0000	+0.9946	18
19	360	(Australia) James Moffat (Australia) Taz Douglas	Nissan Motorsport	Nissan Altima	2:09.1029	+1.0975	19
20	19	(Australia) Jonathon Webb (Germany) Marc Lieb	Tekno Autosports	Holden VF Commodore	2:09.1358	+1.1304	20
21	12	(Australia) Tim Blanchard (Australia) Ashley Walsh	Dick Johnson Racing	Ford FG Falcon	2:09.1912	+1.1858	21
22	80	(Australia) Scott Pye (Australia) Paul Morris	Lucas Dumbrell Motorsport	Holden VF Commodore	2:09.3431	+1.3377	22
23	7	(Australia) Todd Kelly (Australia) David Russell	Nissan Motorsport	Nissan Altima	2:09.3458	+1.3404	23
24	15	(Australia) Rick Kelly (Australia) Karl Reindler	Nissan Motorsport	Nissan Altima	2:09.4861	+1.4807	24
25	66	(Australia) Russell Ingall (Australia) Ryan Briscoe	Walkinshaw Racing	Holden VF Commodore	2:09.5935	+1.5881	25
26	18	(Australia) Alex Davison (New Zealand) John McIntyre	Charlie Schwerkolt Racing	Ford FG Falcon	2:09.6668	+1.6614	26
27	88	(Australia) Dean Fiore (New Zealand) Matt Halliday	Lucas Dumbrell Motorsport	Holden VF Commodore	2:09.6968	+1.6914	27
—^{1}	17	(Australia) Chaz Mostert (Australia) Dale Wood	Dick Johnson Racing	Ford FG Falcon			28
—^{2}	47	(Australia) Tim Slade (Australia) Andrew Thompson	James Rosenberg Racing	Mercedes-Benz E63 AMG			29

Notes:

- ^1 – The car of Chaz Mostert and Dale Wood was unable to take part in qualifying due to a crash in the fifth free practice session.
- ^2 – The car of Tim Slade and Andrew Thompson was unable to take part in qualifying due to a crash in the third free practice session.

=== Top 10 Shootout ===
Position	No.	Driver	Entry	Running order	Qualifying time	Qualifying position	Shootout time	Final grid position
1	1	(Australia) Jamie Whincup	Triple Eight Race Engineering	10th	2:08.0054	1st	2:07.8825	1st
2	5	(Australia) Mark Winterbottom	Ford Performance Racing	9th	2:08.0612	2nd	2:08.0764	2nd
3	8	(Australia) Jason Bright	Brad Jones Racing	8th	2:08.2184	3rd	2:08.2763	3rd
4	97	(New Zealand) Shane van Gisbergen	Tekno Autosports	6th	2:08.2824	5th	2:08.2804	4th
5	22	(Australia) James Courtney	Holden Racing Team	7th	2:08.2476	4th	2:08.8310	5th
6	888	(Australia) Craig Lowndes	Triple Eight Race Engineering	5th	2:08.4042	6th	2:08.9636	6th
7	6	(Australia) Will Davison	Ford Performance Racing	4th	2:08.4451	7th	2:09.0023	7th
8	33	(New Zealand) Scott McLaughlin	Garry Rogers Motorsport	2nd	2:08.5792	9th	2:09.1926	8th
9	55	(Australia) David Reynolds	Rod Nash Racing	3rd	2:08.4475	8th	2:09.2433	9th
10	34	(France) Alexandre Prémat	Garry Rogers Motorsport	1st	2:08.5900	10th	2:10.4145	10th

=== Race ===
Position	No.	Drivers	Entry	Car	Laps	Time/Retired	Grid	Points
1	5	(Australia) Mark Winterbottom (New Zealand) Steven Richards	Ford Performance Racing	Ford Falcon FG	161	6:11:27.9315	2	300
2	1	(Australia) Jamie Whincup (Australia) Paul Dumbrell	Triple Eight Race Engineering	Holden Commodore VF	161	+0.4744	1	276
3	888	(Australia) Craig Lowndes (Australia) Warren Luff	Triple Eight Race Engineering	Holden Commodore VF	161	+6.2369	6	258
4	2	(Australia) Garth Tander (Australia) Nick Percat	Holden Racing Team	Holden Commodore VF	161	+7.0960	11	240
5	8	(Australia) Jason Bright (Australia) Andrew Jones	Brad Jones Racing	Holden Commodore VF	161	+14.1358	3	222
6	80	(Australia) Scott Pye (Australia) Paul Morris	Lucas Dumbrell Motorsport	Holden Commodore VF	161	+20.2543	22	204
7	6	(Australia) Will Davison (Australia) Steve Owen	Ford Performance Racing	Ford Falcon FG	161	+29.2654	7	192
8	33	(New Zealand) Scott McLaughlin (Australia) Jack Perkins	Garry Rogers Motorsport	Holden Commodore VF	161	+43.3411	8	180
9	55	(Australia) David Reynolds (Australia) Dean Canto	Rod Nash Racing	Ford Falcon FG	161	+46.0667	9	168
10	10	(United Kingdom) Andy Priaulx (Sweden) Mattias Ekström	Triple Eight Race Engineering	Holden Commodore VF	161	+48.2772	18	156
11	97	(New Zealand) Shane van Gisbergen (Netherlands) Jeroen Bleekemolen	Tekno Autosports	Holden Commodore VF	161	+50.4744	4	144
12	19	(Australia) Jonathon Webb (Germany) Marc Lieb	Tekno Autosports	Holden Commodore VF	161	+50.8454	20	138
13	18	(Australia) Alex Davison (New Zealand) John McIntyre	Charlie Schwerkolt Racing	Ford Falcon FG	161	+51.1941	26	132
14	4	(Australia) Lee Holdsworth (New Zealand) Craig Baird	Erebus Motorsport	Mercedes-Benz E63 AMG	161	+54.1818	12	126
15	12	(Australia) Tim Blanchard (Australia) Ashley Walsh	Dick Johnson Racing	Ford Falcon FG	161	+1:12.7342	21	120
16	14	(New Zealand) Fabian Coulthard (Australia) Luke Youlden	Brad Jones Racing	Holden Commodore VF	161	+1:14.1235	14	114
17	66	(Australia) Russell Ingall (Australia) Ryan Briscoe	Walkinshaw Racing	Holden Commodore VF	161	+1:35.3803	25	108
18	360	(Australia) James Moffat (Australia) Taz Douglas	Nissan Motorsport	Nissan Altima L33	161	+1:41.7340	19	102
19	15	(Australia) Rick Kelly (Australia) Karl Reindler	Nissan Motorsport	Nissan Altima L33	161	+1:43.6620	24	96
20	9	(Germany) Maro Engel (Australia) Steven Johnson	Erebus Motorsport	Mercedes-Benz E63 AMG	160	+1 lap	16	90
21	17	(Australia) Chaz Mostert (Australia) Dale Wood	Dick Johnson Racing	Ford Falcon FG	156	+5 laps	PL	84
22	21	(Australia) David Wall (New Zealand) Chris Pither	Britek Motorsport	Holden Commodore VF	156	+5 laps	13	78
23	34	(France) Alexandre Prémat (Australia) Greg Ritter	Garry Rogers Motorsport	Holden Commodore VF	154	+7 laps	10	72
24	3	(Australia) Tony D'Alberto (New Zealand) Jonny Reid	Tony D'Alberto Racing	Holden Commodore VF	149	+12 laps	15	66
25	300	(Australia) Michael Caruso (New Zealand) Daniel Gaunt	Nissan Motorsport	Nissan Altima L33	147	+14 laps	17	60
26	47	(Australia) Tim Slade (Australia) Andrew Thompson	James Rosenberg Racing	Mercedes-Benz E63 AMG	137	+24 laps	PL	54
Ret	88	(Australia) Dean Fiore (New Zealand) Matt Halliday	Lucas Dumbrell Motorsport	Holden Commodore VF	145	Gearbox	27	
Ret	22	(Australia) James Courtney (New Zealand) Greg Murphy	Holden Racing Team	Holden Commodore VF	85	Crash	5	
Ret	7	(Australia) Todd Kelly^{2} (Australia) David Russell	Nissan Motorsport	Nissan Altima L33	20	Crash damage	23	

Notes:

- ^1 – Car numbers 17 and 47 started from the pit lane.
- ^2 – Todd Kelly did not drive car number 7 during the race.

== Championship standings after the race ==
- After 29 of 36 races.

Drivers' Championship standings

	Pos.	Driver	Points
	1	Jamie Whincup	2423
	2	Craig Lowndes	2309
1	3	Mark Winterbottom	2281
1	4	Will Davison	2242
1	5	Fabian Coulthard	2015

Teams' Championship standings

Pos.	Team	Points
1	Triple Eight Race Engineering	4772
2	Ford Performance Racing	4548
3	Brad Jones Racing	3997
4	Holden Racing Team	3844
5	Tekno Autosports	3481

- Note: Only the top five positions are included for both sets of standings.

== Broadcast ==
The race was covered by the Seven Network for the seventh consecutive season.

Seven Network
Booth: Neil Crompton, Mark Skaife, Matthew White
Pit-lane: Mark Beretta, Riana Crehan, Mark Larkham
Roving: Tommy Williams
