= 2015 Darwin Triple Crown =

2015 V8 Supercar championship race

(Northern Territory) 2015 Skycity Triple Crown
Event Information
- Round 5 of 14 in the 2015 International V8 Supercars Championship
- Date: 19–21 June 2015
- Location: Darwin, Northern Territory
- Venue: Hidden Valley Raceway
- Weather: Fine

Results
Race 1
Distance	21 laps	60 km
Pole position	James Courtney; Holden Racing Team	1:07.1190
Winner	Chaz Mostert; Prodrive Racing Australia	27:48.7583
Race 2
Distance	21 laps	60 km
Pole position	Rick Kelly; Nissan Motorsport	1:06.2920
Winner	Craig Lowndes; Triple Eight Race Engineering	27:50.5225
Race 3
Distance	70 laps	200 km
Pole position	David Reynolds; Rod Nash Racing	1:06.2526
Winner	David Reynolds; Rod Nash Racing	1:20:42.3270

The 2015 Skycity Triple Crown was a motor race for V8 Supercars held on the weekend of 19–21 June 2015. The event was held at Hidden Valley in Darwin, Northern Territory, and consisted of two sprint races, each over a distance of 60 kilometres (37 miles) and one endurance race over a distance of 200 kilometres (124 miles). It was the fifth round of fourteen in the 2015 International V8 Supercars Championship.

The two sprint races were shared between Holden and Ford; Prodrive Racing Australia driver Chaz Mostert won the opening race by a second ahead of teammate, and championship leader, Mark Winterbottom, while the next three placings were taken by Nissan Motorsport drivers Rick Kelly, James Moffat and Michael Caruso. In race two, Triple Eight Race Engineering's Craig Lowndes led home a Holden 1–2 ahead of Walkinshaw Racing driver Tim Slade, while Mostert completed the podium. With victory, Lowndes became the first V8 Supercar driver to win 100 championship races, spanning 19 years from his maiden win during the 1996 Australian Touring Car Championship season.

The main 200 kilometres (124 miles) race was won by David Reynolds for Rod Nash Racing, having started from pole position. Mostert again finished on the podium, with a second-place finish, while Fabian Coulthard completed the podium for the Brad Jones Racing team. In the championship standings, the top three drivers remained the same; however, Winterbottom extended his championship lead from 12 to 95 ahead of Lowndes, while Coulthard moved closer to Lowndes, trailing by 60 points. Mostert's triple podium finish moved him up to fourth in the standings.

== Results ==
=== Race 13 ===
Pos.	No.	Driver	Car	Team	Laps	Time/Retired	Grid	Points
1	6	(Australia) Chaz Mostert	Ford FG X Falcon	Prodrive Racing Australia	21	27:48.7583	2	75
2	5	(Australia) Mark Winterbottom	Ford FG X Falcon	Prodrive Racing Australia	21	+1.0 s	6	69
3	15	(Australia) Rick Kelly	Nissan Altima L33	Nissan Motorsport	21	+2.1 s	7	64
4	99	(Australia) James Moffat	Nissan Altima L33	Nissan Motorsport	21	+2.4 s	8	60
5	23	(Australia) Michael Caruso	Nissan Altima L33	Nissan Motorsport	21	+3.4 s	19	55
6	17	(Australia) Scott Pye	Ford FG X Falcon	DJR Team Penske	21	+3.7 s	20	51
7	47	(Australia) Tim Slade	Holden VF Commodore	Walkinshaw Racing	21	+4.0 s	10	48
8	21	(Australia) Dale Wood	Holden VF Commodore	Britek Motorsport	21	+4.3 s	11	45
9	222	(Australia) Nick Percat	Holden VF Commodore	Lucas Dumbrell Motorsport	21	+4.7 s	16	42
10	7	(Australia) Todd Kelly	Nissan Altima L33	Nissan Motorsport	21	+5.0 s	18	39
11	1	(Australia) Jamie Whincup	Holden VF Commodore	Triple Eight Race Engineering	21	+5.3 s	3	36
12	97	(New Zealand) Shane van Gisbergen	Holden VF Commodore	Tekno Autosports	21	+5.9 s	5	34
13	18	(Australia) Lee Holdsworth	Holden VF Commodore	Charlie Schwerkolt Racing	21	+6.3 s	24	33
14	9	(Australia) Will Davison	Mercedes-Benz E63 AMG	Erebus Motorsport	21	+6.6 s	21	31
15	34	(Australia) David Wall	Volvo S60	Garry Rogers Motorsport	21	+7.1 s	25	30
16	55	(Australia) David Reynolds	Ford FG X Falcon	Rod Nash Racing	21	+7.3 s	12	28
17	3	(Australia) Tim Blanchard	Holden VF Commodore	Lucas Dumbrell Motorsport	21	+8.2 s	22	27
18	888	(Australia) Craig Lowndes	Holden VF Commodore	Triple Eight Race Engineering	21	+8.5 s	9	25
19	8	(Australia) Jason Bright	Holden VF Commodore	Brad Jones Racing	21	+8.8 s	13	24
20	2	(Australia) Garth Tander	Holden VF Commodore	Holden Racing Team	21	+9.4 s	15	22
21	4	(Australia) Ashley Walsh	Mercedes-Benz E63 AMG	Erebus Motorsport	21	+10.0 s	23	21
22	111	(New Zealand) Andre Heimgartner	Ford FG X Falcon	Super Black Racing	21	+10.2 s	17	19
23	22	(Australia) James Courtney	Holden VF Commodore	Holden Racing Team	21	+12.1 s	1	18
DNF	14	(New Zealand) Fabian Coulthard	Holden VF Commodore	Brad Jones Racing	0		4	
DNF	33	(New Zealand) Scott McLaughlin	Volvo S60	Garry Rogers Motorsport	0		14	

=== Race 14 ===
Pos.	No.	Driver	Car	Team	Laps	Time/Retired	Grid	Points
1	888	(Australia) Craig Lowndes	Holden VF Commodore	Triple Eight Race Engineering	21	27:50.5225	5	75
2	47	(Australia) Tim Slade	Holden VF Commodore	Walkinshaw Racing	21	+1.8 s	8	69
3	6	(Australia) Chaz Mostert	Ford FG X Falcon	Prodrive Racing Australia	21	+2.4 s	3	64
4	17	(Australia) Scott Pye	Ford FG X Falcon	DJR Team Penske	21	+3.9 s	9	60
5	97	(New Zealand) Shane van Gisbergen	Holden VF Commodore	Tekno Autosports	21	+5.3 s	4	55
6	22	(Australia) James Courtney	Holden VF Commodore	Holden Racing Team	21	+6.0 s	7	51
7	5	(Australia) Mark Winterbottom	Ford FG X Falcon	Prodrive Racing Australia	21	+6.4 s	10	48
8	2	(Australia) Garth Tander	Holden VF Commodore	Holden Racing Team	21	+7.7 s	18	45
9	33	(New Zealand) Scott McLaughlin	Volvo S60	Garry Rogers Motorsport	21	+10.2 s	11	42
10	55	(Australia) David Reynolds	Ford FG X Falcon	Rod Nash Racing	21	+10.4 s	13	39
11	99	(Australia) James Moffat	Nissan Altima L33	Nissan Motorsport	21	+11.5 s	12	36
12	7	(Australia) Todd Kelly	Nissan Altima L33	Nissan Motorsport	21	+12.1 s	15	34
13	8	(Australia) Jason Bright	Holden VF Commodore	Brad Jones Racing	21	+15.3 s	14	33
14	23	(Australia) Michael Caruso	Nissan Altima L33	Nissan Motorsport	21	+15.6 s	6	31
15	14	(New Zealand) Fabian Coulthard	Holden VF Commodore	Brad Jones Racing	21	+15.9 s	2	30
16	1	(Australia) Jamie Whincup	Holden VF Commodore	Triple Eight Race Engineering	21	+16.4 s	17	28
17	34	(Australia) David Wall	Volvo S60	Garry Rogers Motorsport	21	+19.4 s	23	27
18	18	(Australia) Lee Holdsworth	Holden VF Commodore	Charlie Schwerkolt Racing	21	+19.8 s	19	25
19	9	(Australia) Will Davison	Mercedes-Benz E63 AMG	Erebus Motorsport	21	+30.0 s	21	24
20	4	(Australia) Ashley Walsh	Mercedes-Benz E63 AMG	Erebus Motorsport	21	+30.8 s	25	22
21	15	(Australia) Rick Kelly	Nissan Altima L33	Nissan Motorsport	21	+52.5 s	1	21
22	21	(Australia) Dale Wood	Holden VF Commodore	Britek Motorsport	18	+3 laps	24	19
DNF	3	(Australia) Tim Blanchard	Holden VF Commodore	Lucas Dumbrell Motorsport	9		22	
DNF	222	(Australia) Nick Percat	Holden VF Commodore	Lucas Dumbrell Motorsport	1		20	
DNF	111	(New Zealand) Andre Heimgartner	Ford FG X Falcon	Super Black Racing	0		16	

=== Race 15 ===
Pos.	No.	Driver	Car	Team	Laps	Time/Retired	Grid	Points
1	55	(Australia) David Reynolds	Ford FG X Falcon	Rod Nash Racing	70	1:20:42.3270	1	150
2	6	(Australia) Chaz Mostert	Ford FG X Falcon	Prodrive Racing Australia	70	+0.8 s	4	138
3	14	(New Zealand) Fabian Coulthard	Holden VF Commodore	Brad Jones Racing	70	+1.4 s	2	129
4	97	(New Zealand) Shane van Gisbergen	Holden VF Commodore	Tekno Autosports	70	+9.6 s	3	120
5	5	(Australia) Mark Winterbottom	Ford FG X Falcon	Prodrive Racing Australia	70	+13.1 s	6	111
6	222	(Australia) Nick Percat	Holden VF Commodore	Lucas Dumbrell Motorsport	70	+15.6 s	8	102
7	22	(Australia) James Courtney	Holden VF Commodore	Holden Racing Team	70	+21.6 s	7	96
8	8	(Australia) Jason Bright	Holden VF Commodore	Brad Jones Racing	70	+23.4 s	9	90
9	47	(Australia) Tim Slade	Holden VF Commodore	Walkinshaw Racing	70	+29.2 s	14	84
10	21	(Australia) Dale Wood	Holden VF Commodore	Britek Motorsport	70	+32.3 s	5	78
11	33	(New Zealand) Scott McLaughlin	Volvo S60	Garry Rogers Motorsport	70	+34.2 s	21	72
12	2	(Australia) Garth Tander	Holden VF Commodore	Holden Racing Team	70	+35.0 s	23	69
13	15	(Australia) Rick Kelly	Nissan Altima L33	Nissan Motorsport	70	+38.6 s	17	66
14	99	(Australia) James Moffat	Nissan Altima L33	Nissan Motorsport	70	+39.8 s	16	63
15	888	(Australia) Craig Lowndes	Holden VF Commodore	Triple Eight Race Engineering	70	+47.1 s	15	60
16	17	(Australia) Scott Pye	Ford FG X Falcon	DJR Team Penske	70	+47.5 s	13	57
17	7	(Australia) Todd Kelly	Nissan Altima L33	Nissan Motorsport	70	+50.8 s	19	54
18	18	(Australia) Lee Holdsworth	Holden VF Commodore	Charlie Schwerkolt Racing	70	+53.8 s	18	51
19	111	(New Zealand) Andre Heimgartner	Ford FG X Falcon	Super Black Racing	70	+54.0 s	10	48
20	34	(Australia) David Wall	Volvo S60	Garry Rogers Motorsport	70	+61.9 s	25	45
21	23	(Australia) Michael Caruso	Nissan Altima L33	Nissan Motorsport	70	+67.4 s	11	42
22	1	(Australia) Jamie Whincup	Holden VF Commodore	Triple Eight Race Engineering	69	+1 lap	12	39
23	3	(Australia) Tim Blanchard	Holden VF Commodore	Lucas Dumbrell Motorsport	69	+1 lap	22	36
24	9	(Australia) Will Davison	Mercedes-Benz E63 AMG	Erebus Motorsport	69	+1 lap	20	33
DNF	4	(Australia) Ashley Walsh	Mercedes-Benz E63 AMG	Erebus Motorsport	33		24	

== Championship standings ==
- After Race 15 of 36.

Drivers' Championship standings

Pos.	Driver	Points
1	(Australia) Mark Winterbottom	1165
2	(Australia) Craig Lowndes	1070
3	(New Zealand) Fabian Coulthard	1010
4	(Australia) Chaz Mostert	991
5	(New Zealand) Shane van Gisbergen	940

Teams' Championship standings

Pos.	Constructor	Points
1	Prodrive Racing Australia	2156
2	Triple Eight Race Engineering	1989
3	Holden Racing Team	1845
4	Brad Jones Racing	1719
5	Nissan Motorsport (7/15)	1449

- Note: Only the top five positions are included for both sets of standings.
