= 2015 Auckland 500 =

Motor race meeting

(New Zealand) 2015 ITM 500 Auckland
Event Information
- Round 12 of 14 in the 2015 International V8 Supercars Championship
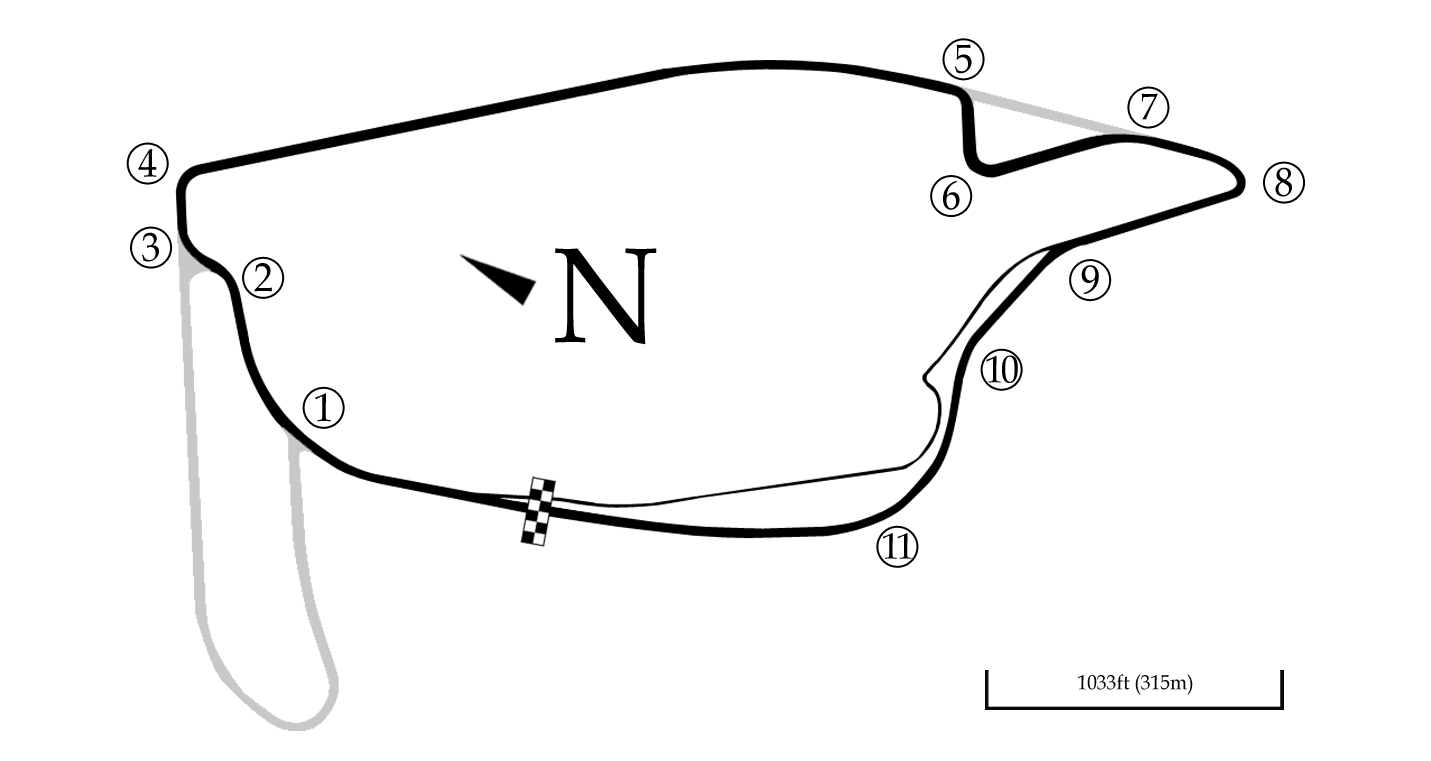
- Date: 6–8 November 2015
- Location: Pukekohe, New Zealand
- Venue: Pukekohe Park Raceway
- Weather: Fine

Results
Race 1
Distance	21 laps	60 km
Pole position	Jamie Whincup; Triple Eight Race Engineering	1:03.3203
Winner	Jamie Whincup; Triple Eight Race Engineering	24:48.8376
Race 2
Distance	21 laps	60 km
Pole position	David Reynolds; Rod Nash Racing	1:02.4690
Winner	David Reynolds; Rod Nash Racing	26:37.9563
Race 3
Distance	69 laps	200 km
Pole position	Scott McLaughlin; Garry Rogers Motorsport	1:03.1629
Winner	Jamie Whincup; Triple Eight Race Engineering	1:18:57.1974

The 2015 ITM 500 Auckland was a motor race meeting for the Australian sedan-based V8 Supercars. It was the twelfth event of the 2015 International V8 Supercars Championship. It was held on the weekend of 6–8 November at the Pukekohe Park Raceway, near Pukekohe, New Zealand.

== Race results ==
=== Race 28 ===
==== Qualifying ====
Pos.	No.	Name	Team	Car	Time
1	1	(Australia) Jamie Whincup	Triple Eight Race Engineering	Holden Commodore (VF)	1:03.3203
2	55	(Australia) David Reynolds	Rod Nash Racing	Ford Falcon (FG X)	1:03.3248
3	17	(Australia) Scott Pye	DJR Team Penske	Ford Falcon (FG X)	1:03.4053
4	97	(New Zealand) Shane van Gisbergen	Tekno Autosports	Holden Commodore (VF)	1:03.4528
5	33	(New Zealand) Scott McLaughlin	Garry Rogers Motorsport	Volvo S60	1:03.4772
6	888	(Australia) Craig Lowndes	Triple Eight Race Engineering	Holden Commodore (VF)	1:03.5682
7	5	(Australia) Mark Winterbottom	Prodrive Racing Australia	Ford Falcon (FG X)	1:03.5874
8	23	(Australia) Michael Caruso	Nissan Motorsport	Nissan Altima (L33)	1:03.6541
9	22	(Australia) James Courtney	Holden Racing Team	Holden Commodore (VF)	1:03.6552
10	99	(Australia) James Moffat	Nissan Motorsport	Nissan Altima (L33)	1:03.7285
11	47	(Australia) Tim Slade	Walkinshaw Racing	Holden Commodore (VF)	1:03.7300
12	9	(Australia) Will Davison	Erebus Motorsport	Mercedes-Benz E63 AMG	1:03.7339
13	8	(Australia) Jason Bright	Brad Jones Racing	Holden Commodore (VF)	1:03.7349
14	6	(Australia) Cam Waters	Prodrive Racing Australia	Ford Falcon (FG X)	1:03.7518
15	14	(New Zealand) Fabian Coulthard	Brad Jones Racing	Holden Commodore (VF)	1:03.7639
16	18	(Australia) Lee Holdsworth	Charlie Schwerkolt Racing	Holden Commodore (VF)	1:03.7979
17	2	(Australia) Garth Tander	Holden Racing Team	Holden Commodore (VF)	1:03.8452
18	21	(Australia) Dale Wood	Britek Motorsport	Holden Commodore (VF)	1:03.8962
19	15	(Australia) Rick Kelly	Nissan Motorsport	Nissan Altima (L33)	1:03.9610
20	7	(Australia) Todd Kelly	Nissan Motorsport	Nissan Altima (L33)	1:04.0202
21	34	(Australia) David Wall	Garry Rogers Motorsport	Volvo S60	1:04.1423
22	3	(Australia) Tim Blanchard	Lucas Dumbrell Motorsport	Holden Commodore (VF)	1:04.2212
23	111	(New Zealand) Andre Heimgartner	Super Black Racing	Ford Falcon (FG X)	1:04.4514
24	10	(Australia) Ashley Walsh	Erebus Motorsport	Mercedes-Benz E63 AMG	1:04.5406
25	222	(Australia) Nick Percat	Lucas Dumbrell Motorsport	Holden Commodore (VF)	1:05.7711

==== Race ====
Pos.	No.	Name	Team	Laps	Time	Grid
1	1	(Australia) Jamie Whincup	Triple Eight Race Engineering	21	24min 48.8376sec	1
2	97	(New Zealand) Shane van Gisbergen	Tekno Autosports	21	+ 4.38	4
3	55	(Australia) David Reynolds	Rod Nash Racing	21	+ 5.02	2
4	888	(Australia) Craig Lowndes	Triple Eight Race Engineering	21	+ 7.95	6
5 ^{1}	17	(Australia) Scott Pye	DJR Team Penske	21	+ 7.48	3
6	23	(Australia) Michael Caruso	Nissan Motorsport	21	+ 8.57	8
7	5	(Australia) Mark Winterbottom	Prodrive Racing Australia	21	+ 9.16	7
8	22	(Australia) James Courtney	Holden Racing Team	21	+ 9.65	9
9	33	(New Zealand) Scott McLaughlin	Garry Rogers Motorsport	21	+ 11.58	5
10	2	(Australia) Garth Tander	Holden Racing Team	21	+ 13.18	17
11	99	(Australia) James Moffat	Nissan Motorsport	21	+ 13.98	10
12	7	(Australia) Todd Kelly	Nissan Motorsport	21	+ 17.37	20
13	18	(Australia) Lee Holdsworth	Charlie Schwerkolt Racing	21	+ 17.92	16
14	15	(Australia) Rick Kelly	Nissan Motorsport	21	+ 18.99	19
15	47	(Australia) Tim Slade	Walkinshaw Racing	21	+ 19.36	11
16	222	(Australia) Nick Percat	Lucas Dumbrell Motorsport	21	+ 19.77	25
17	6	(Australia) Cam Waters	Prodrive Racing Australia	21	+ 20.95	14
18	34	(Australia) David Wall	Garry Rogers Motorsport	21	+ 23.15	21
19	111	(New Zealand) Andre Heimgartner	Super Black Racing	21	+ 23.45	23
20	10	(Australia) Ashley Walsh	Erebus Motorsport	21	+ 24.72	24
21	21	(Australia) Dale Wood	Britek Motorsport	21	+ 30.19	18
22	3	(Australia) Tim Blanchard	Lucas Dumbrell Motorsport	21	+ 42.24	22
23	14	(New Zealand) Fabian Coulthard	Brad Jones Racing	20	+ 1 lap	15
Ret	8	(Australia) Jason Bright	Brad Jones Racing	19	Retired	13
Ret	9	(Australia) Will Davison	Erebus Motorsport	0	Collision	12
Fastest lap: Jamie Whincup (Triple Eight Race Engineering), 1:04.3571

Notes

- ^1 – Scott Pye was demoted behind Craig Lowndes after officials deemed him to have gained an advantage by using the escape road at turn five and missing out the chicane.

=== Race 29 ===
==== Qualifying ====
Pos.	No.	Name	Team	Car	Time
1	55	(Australia) David Reynolds	Rod Nash Racing	Ford Falcon (FG X)	1:02.4690
2	888	(Australia) Craig Lowndes	Triple Eight Race Engineering	Holden Commodore (VF)	1:02.4918
3	33	(New Zealand) Scott McLaughlin	Garry Rogers Motorsport	Volvo S60	1:02.5714
4	1	(Australia) Jamie Whincup	Triple Eight Race Engineering	Holden Commodore (VF)	1:02.5910
5	22	(Australia) James Courtney	Holden Racing Team	Holden Commodore (VF)	1:02.6672
6	5	(Australia) Mark Winterbottom	Prodrive Racing Australia	Ford Falcon (FG X)	1:02.7002
7	47	(Australia) Tim Slade	Walkinshaw Racing	Holden Commodore (VF)	1:02.7703
8	17	(Australia) Scott Pye	DJR Team Penske	Ford Falcon (FG X)	1:02.8396
9	14	(New Zealand) Fabian Coulthard	Brad Jones Racing	Holden Commodore (VF)	1:02.8535
10	6	(Australia) Cam Waters	Prodrive Racing Australia	Ford Falcon (FG X)	1:02.8731
11	2	(Australia) Garth Tander	Holden Racing Team	Holden Commodore (VF)	1:02.8849
12	111	(New Zealand) Andre Heimgartner	Super Black Racing	Ford Falcon (FG X)	1:02.8855
13	97	(New Zealand) Shane van Gisbergen	Tekno Autosports	Holden Commodore (VF)	1:03.0046
14	18	(Australia) Lee Holdsworth	Charlie Schwerkolt Racing	Holden Commodore (VF)	1:03.0176
15	15	(Australia) Rick Kelly	Nissan Motorsport	Nissan Altima (L33)	1:03.0538
16	9	(Australia) Will Davison	Erebus Motorsport	Mercedes-Benz E63 AMG	1:03.1138
17	23	(Australia) Michael Caruso	Nissan Motorsport	Nissan Altima (L33)	1:03.1181
18	8	(Australia) Jason Bright	Brad Jones Racing	Holden Commodore (VF)	1:03.1188
19	7	(Australia) Todd Kelly	Nissan Motorsport	Nissan Altima (L33)	1:03.1192
20	222	(Australia) Nick Percat	Lucas Dumbrell Motorsport	Holden Commodore (VF)	1:03.1732
21	99	(Australia) James Moffat	Nissan Motorsport	Nissan Altima (L33)	1:03.1867
22	3	(Australia) Tim Blanchard	Lucas Dumbrell Motorsport	Holden Commodore (VF)	1:03.3498
23	34	(Australia) David Wall	Garry Rogers Motorsport	Volvo S60	1:03.3978
24	21	(Australia) Dale Wood	Britek Motorsport	Holden Commodore (VF)	1:03.4410
-	10	(Australia) Ashley Walsh	Erebus Motorsport	Mercedes-Benz E63 AMG	No Time

==== Race ====
Pos.	No.	Name	Team	Laps	Time	Grid
1	55	(Australia) David Reynolds	Rod Nash Racing	21	26min 37.9563sec	1
2	1	(Australia) Jamie Whincup	Triple Eight Race Engineering	21	+ 0.50	4
3	33	(New Zealand) Scott McLaughlin	Garry Rogers Motorsport	21	+ 0.87	3
4	5	(Australia) Mark Winterbottom	Prodrive Racing Australia	21	+ 1.57	6
5	97	(New Zealand) Shane van Gisbergen	Tekno Autosports	21	+ 1.91	13
6	22	(Australia) James Courtney	Holden Racing Team	21	+ 2.43	5
7	47	(Australia) Tim Slade	Walkinshaw Racing	21	+ 3.75	7
8	17	(Australia) Scott Pye	DJR Team Penske	21	+ 4.64	8
9	14	(New Zealand) Fabian Coulthard	Brad Jones Racing	21	+ 5.62	9
10	2	(Australia) Garth Tander	Holden Racing Team	21	+ 6.24	11
11	15	(Australia) Rick Kelly	Nissan Motorsport	21	+ 7.66	15
12	6	(Australia) Cam Waters	Prodrive Racing Australia	21	+ 7.89	10
13	9	(Australia) Will Davison	Erebus Motorsport	21	+ 8.36	16
14	99	(Australia) James Moffat	Nissan Motorsport	21	+ 9.17	21
15	23	(Australia) Michael Caruso	Nissan Motorsport	21	+ 9.75	17
16	18	(Australia) Lee Holdsworth	Charlie Schwerkolt Racing	21	+ 10.65	14
17	7	(Australia) Todd Kelly	Nissan Motorsport	21	+ 11.48	19
18	111	(New Zealand) Andre Heimgartner	Super Black Racing	21	+ 12.10	12
19	21	(Australia) Dale Wood	Britek Motorsport	21	+ 14.98	24
20	222	(Australia) Nick Percat	Lucas Dumbrell Motorsport	21	+ 15.18	20
21	10	(Australia) Ashley Walsh	Erebus Motorsport	21	+ 15.31	24
22	34	(Australia) David Wall	Garry Rogers Motorsport	21	+ 15.68	23
23	3	(Australia) Tim Blanchard	Lucas Dumbrell Motorsport	21	+ 16.48	22
Ret	888	(Australia) Craig Lowndes	Triple Eight Race Engineering	11	Accident	2
DNS	8	(Australia) Jason Bright	Brad Jones Racing		Did Not Start	
Fastest lap: Craig Lowndes (Triple Eight Race Engineering), 1:03.2524

=== Race 30 ===
==== Qualifying ====
Pos.	No.	Name	Team	Car	Time
1	33	(New Zealand) Scott McLaughlin	Garry Rogers Motorsport	Volvo S60	1:03.1629
2	1	(Australia) Jamie Whincup	Triple Eight Race Engineering	Holden Commodore (VF)	1:03.1643
3	17	(Australia) Scott Pye	DJR Team Penske	Ford Falcon (FG X)	1:03.2188
4	55	(Australia) David Reynolds	Rod Nash Racing	Holden Commodore (VF)	1:03.2517
5	23	(Australia) Michael Caruso	Nissan Motorsport	Nissan Altima (L33)	1:03.2848
6	14	(New Zealand) Fabian Coulthard	Brad Jones Racing	Holden Commodore (VF)	1:03.3274
7	99	(Australia) James Moffat	Nissan Motorsport	Nissan Altima (L33)	1:03.3432
8	97	(New Zealand) Shane van Gisbergen	Tekno Autosports	Holden Commodore (VF)	1:03.3619
9	5	(Australia) Mark Winterbottom	Prodrive Racing Australia	Ford Falcon (FG X)	1:03.3834
10	888	(Australia) Craig Lowndes	Triple Eight Race Engineering	Holden Commodore (VF)	1:03.4660
11	6	(Australia) Cam Waters	Prodrive Racing Australia	Ford Falcon (FG X)	1:03.4926
12	8	(Australia) Jason Bright	Brad Jones Racing	Holden Commodore (VF)	1:03.5314
13	9	(Australia) Will Davison	Erebus Motorsport	Mercedes-Benz E63 AMG	1:03.5555
14	2	(Australia) Garth Tander	Holden Racing Team	Holden Commodore (VF)	1:03.5789
15	22	(Australia) James Courtney	Holden Racing Team	Holden Commodore (VF)	1:03.6259
16	18	(Australia) Lee Holdsworth	Charlie Schwerkolt Racing	Holden Commodore (VF)	1:03.6281
17	15	(Australia) Rick Kelly	Nissan Motorsport	Nissan Altima (L33)	1:03.6327
18	222	(Australia) Nick Percat	Lucas Dumbrell Motorsport	Holden Commodore (VF)	1:03.6592
19	47	(Australia) Tim Slade	Walkinshaw Racing	Holden Commodore (VF)	1:03.6849
20	7	(Australia) Todd Kelly	Nissan Motorsport	Nissan Altima (L33)	1:03.7966
21	3	(Australia) Tim Blanchard	Lucas Dumbrell Motorsport	Holden Commodore (VF)	1:03.8064
22	10	(Australia) Ashley Walsh	Erebus Motorsport	Mercedes-Benz E63 AMG	1:03.8244
23	111	(New Zealand) Andre Heimgartner	Super Black Racing	Ford Falcon (FG X)	1:03.8248
24	34	(Australia) David Wall	Garry Rogers Motorsport	Volvo S60	1:03.9138
25	21	(Australia) Dale Wood	Britek Motorsport	Holden Commodore (VF)	1:03.9900

==== Race ====
Pos.	No.	Name	Team	Laps	Time	Grid
1	1	(Australia) Jamie Whincup	Triple Eight Race Engineering	69	1hr 18min 57.1973sec	2
2	888	(Australia) Craig Lowndes	Triple Eight Race Engineering	69	+ 4.06	10
3	17	(Australia) Scott Pye	DJR Team Penske	69	+ 10.81	3
4	55	(Australia) David Reynolds	Rod Nash Racing	69	+ 12.70	4
5	23	(Australia) Michael Caruso	Nissan Motorsport	69	+ 13.12	5
6	33	(New Zealand) Scott McLaughlin	Garry Rogers Motorsport	69	+ 17.08	1
7	14	(New Zealand) Fabian Coulthard	Brad Jones Racing	69	+ 22.34	6
8	18	(Australia) Lee Holdsworth	Charlie Schwerkolt Racing	69	+ 27.36	16
9	97	(New Zealand) Shane van Gisbergen	Tekno Autosports	69	+ 34.97	8
10	2	(Australia) Garth Tander	Holden Racing Team	69	+ 39.73	14
11	5	(Australia) Mark Winterbottom	Prodrive Racing Australia	69	+ 40.39	9
12	3	(Australia) Tim Blanchard	Lucas Dumbrell Motorsport	69	+ 44.58	21
13	7	(Australia) Todd Kelly	Nissan Motorsport	69	+ 45.07	20
14	99	(Australia) James Moffat	Nissan Motorsport	69	+ 47.09	7
15	22	(Australia) James Courtney	Holden Racing Team	69	+ 52.23	15
16	9	(Australia) Will Davison	Erebus Motorsport	69	+ 54.35	13
17	15	(Australia) Rick Kelly	Nissan Motorsport	69	+ 55.17	17
18	8	(Australia) Jason Bright	Brad Jones Racing	69	+ 66.51	12
19	21	(Australia) Dale Wood	Britek Motorsport	69	+ 66.78	25
20	34	(Australia) David Wall	Garry Rogers Motorsport	69	+ 67.01	20
21	111	(New Zealand) Andre Heimgartner	Super Black Racing	68	+ 1 lap	23
22	6	(Australia) Cam Waters	Prodrive Racing Australia	68	+ 1 lap	11
23	47	(Australia) Tim Slade	Walkinshaw Racing	68	+ 1 lap	19
24	10	(Australia) Ashley Walsh	Erebus Motorsport	67	+ 2 laps	22
Ret	222	(Australia) Nick Percat	Lucas Dumbrell Motorsport	6	Retired	18
Fastest lap: Jamie Whincup (Triple Eight Race Engineering), 1:03.2790
