= Rod Nash Racing =

Supercars Championship racing entity

- Manufacturer: Ford
- Team Principal: Rod Nash
- Team Manager: Darron Tait
- Race Drivers: 55. Thomas Randle
- Chassis: Mustang GT
- Debut: 1998
- Drivers' Championships: 0
- Round wins: 1
- Race wins: 4
- 2017 position: 9
- 10th (2748 pts)

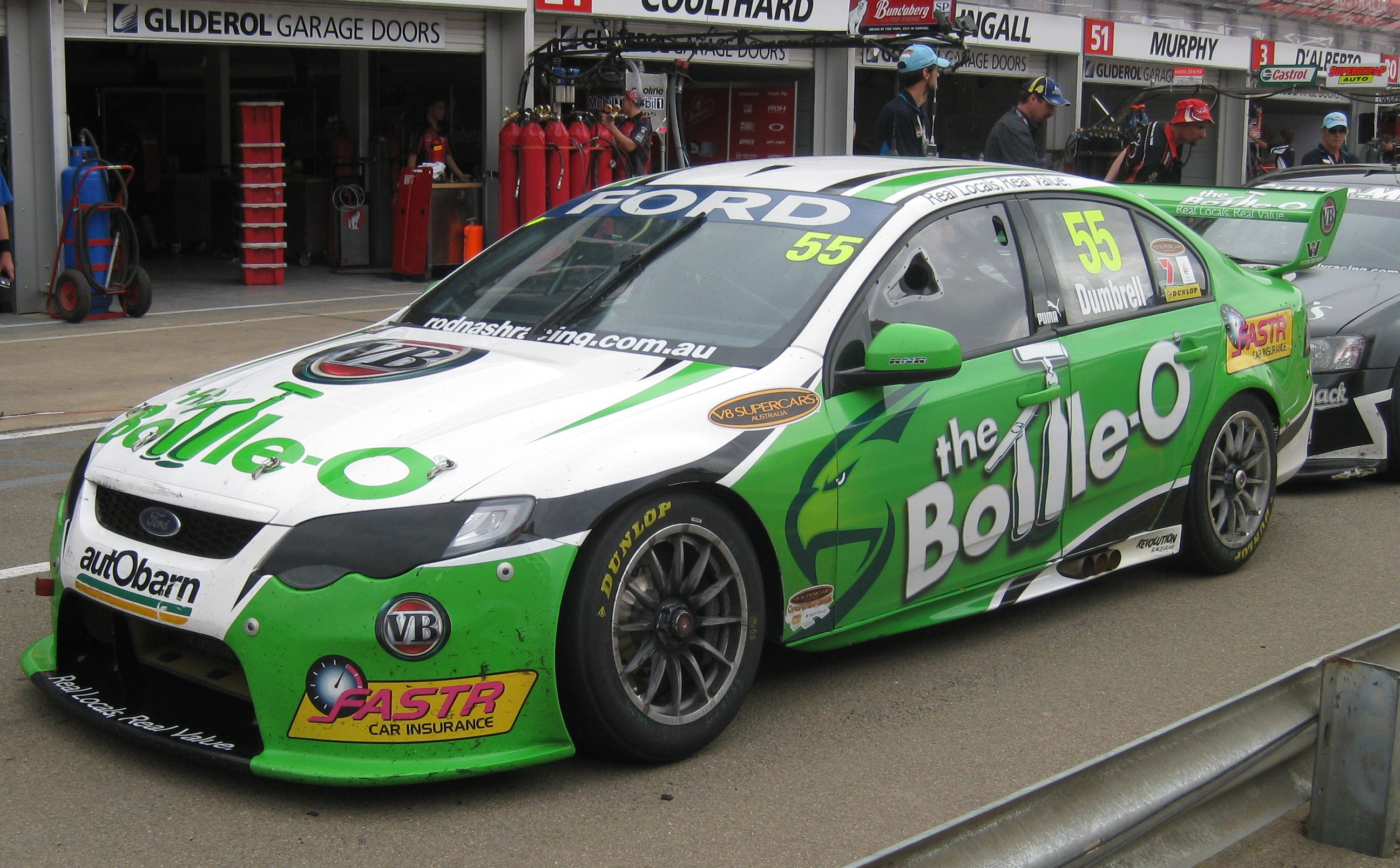
Paul Dumbrell at the 2010 Clipsal 500.

Rod Nash Racing is a Supercars Championship racing entity, owned by Rod Nash. Nash co-owns Tickford Racing and since 2018, Rod Nash Racing has run under the Tickford name.

== Racing history ==
=== Privateer entry ===
Rod Nash first appeared in the series in 1998 after purchasing a Holden VS Commodore from Wayne Gardner Racing. Nash ran the car again in 1999 debuting a new VT Commodore at Bathurst. In 2000 Nash hired Cameron McConville to drive the car before appearing in a 2nd VT later in the year. In 2001 Tony Longhurst drove the car with Nash and Tony Ricciardello driving the car in the endurance races.

=== Team Brock ===
For 2002, Nash formed an alliance with Peter Brock and ran Craig Baird under the Team Brock banner with Mark Noske co-driving at the Queensland 500 and Brock at the Bathurst 1000.

=== Ford Performance Racing ===
In 2003, Nash leased his Racing Entitlement Contract to Ford Performance Racing allowing them to enter a third Ford BA Falcon for David Besnard.

=== Perkins Engineering ===
For the 2004 Season, Nash did a deal with Larry Perkins to run a Castrol sponsored VX Commodore out of the Perkins Engineering workshop with Tony Longhurst driving. Alex Davison replaced Longhurst for the last two rounds and drove a Perkins VZ Commodore for most of 2005, being replaced by Owen Kelly for the last two rounds.

=== Paul Morris Motorsport ===
In 2006, Nash purchased a VZ Commodore from Paul Morris Motorsport with Steve Owen driving, teaming with Tony Longhurst to finish 7th at Bathurst. In 2007, Owen once again drove with the same car but now prepared by Independent Race Cars Australia. They became a privateer team over the season as well, losing support from Holden. The team struggled at the beginning of the season, but started to find form finishing 6th at Bathurst. Owen finished 19th while the team finished just outside the top 10 in 11th in the teams' championship.

=== Tony D'Alberto Racing ===
In 2008, Nash formed an alliance with Tony D'Alberto Racing, who acquired a Walkinshaw Racing built VE Commodore. Tony D'Alberto shared the Car with Jason Bargwanna in the endurance races. The relationship continued in 2009 with Andrew Thompson joining for the endurance races. After two seasons together, Nash had a new opportunity with Ford Performance Racing, so Tony D'Alberto Racing and Nash separated.

=== Ford Performance Racing/Prodrive Racing Australia ===
Late in 2009, Nash signed a deal with Ford Performance Racing for a fully prepared Ford FG Falcon, with continued sponsorship from the Bottle-O chain of liquor stores. The car was driven by Paul Dumbrell. After winning a race at Sandown, Dumbrell again raced the car in 2011 before retiring and being replaced for 2012 by David Reynolds. A season of promise was highlighted by 2nd place at Bathurst.

In January 2013, Rod Nash in partnership with Rusty French purchased Ford Performance Racing from Prodrive. Later on in the year, the team won Race 31 at the Gold Coast 600 with Reynolds and co-driver Dean Canto. In 2014 the team continued with Reynolds and recorded a best result of 3rd at the Sydney 500.

In 2015 the team upgraded to the new Ford FG X Falcon for the 2nd round of the championship, after running the FG Falcon at the Clipsal 500. Rod Nash Racing then went on to have its best-ever season with Reynolds winning race 15 in Darwin and race 29 in Auckland. Reynolds had a total of 7 podiums and 3 pole positions, with one of them being at the Bathurst 1000. He went on the finish 3rd in the championship.

In 2016 the team welcomed Chaz Mostert, who had previously driven for Prodrive Racing Australia in car No. 6 but was moved across to car No. 55 for sponsorship purposes, with Supercheap Auto becoming the primary sponsor. It was Mostert's first season back since his accident during qualifying at the 2015 Supercheap Auto Bathurst 1000. He recorded 5 pole positions and 3rd placings to finish the championship in 7th position.

In 2017 Mostert continued with Rod Nash Racing and won 3 races and the Pirtek Enduro Cup with co-driver Steve Owen. Mostert finished the championship in 5th place.

In December 2017 it was announced that Prodrive Racing Australia was going to be rebranded as Tickford Racing, meaning that the Rod Nash Racing name would no longer be used in the Supercars Championship.

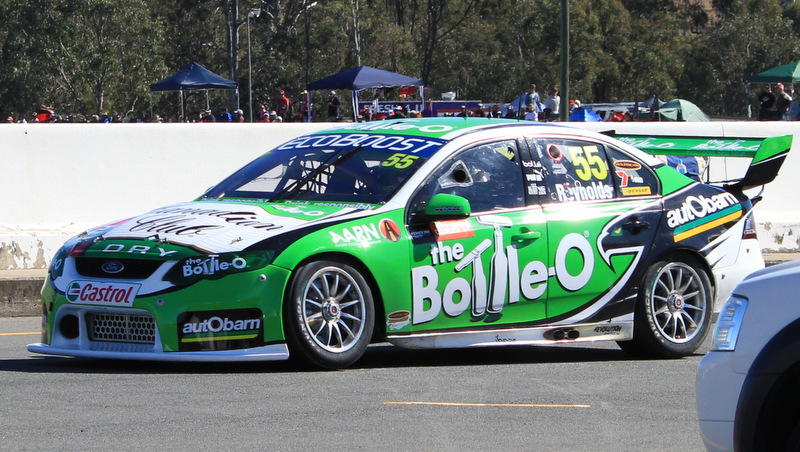
David Reynolds driving the #55 Bottle-O Racing Team Ford FG Falcon in 2012

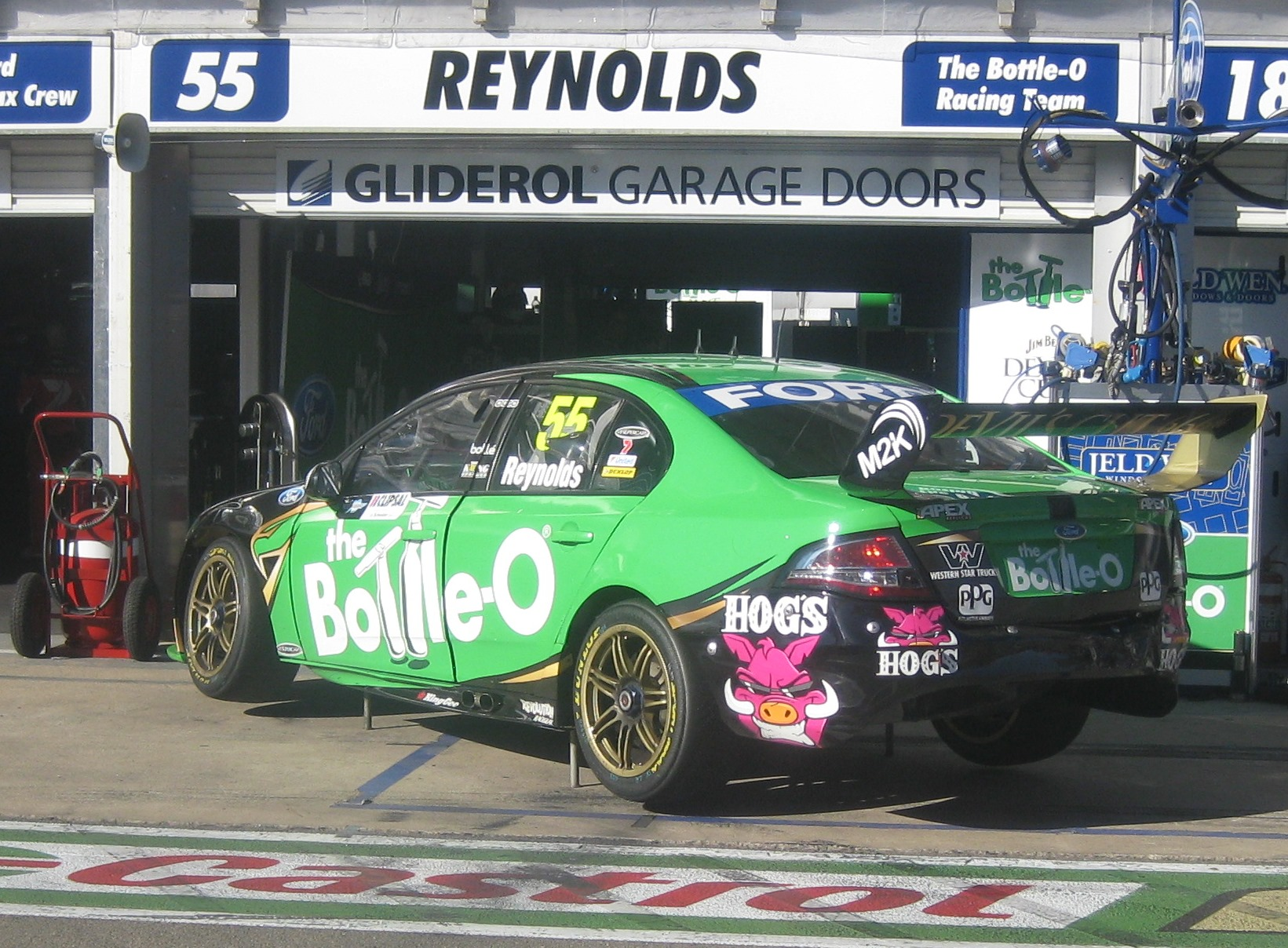
David Reynolds drove the #55 Bottle-O Racing Team Ford FG Falcon in 2014

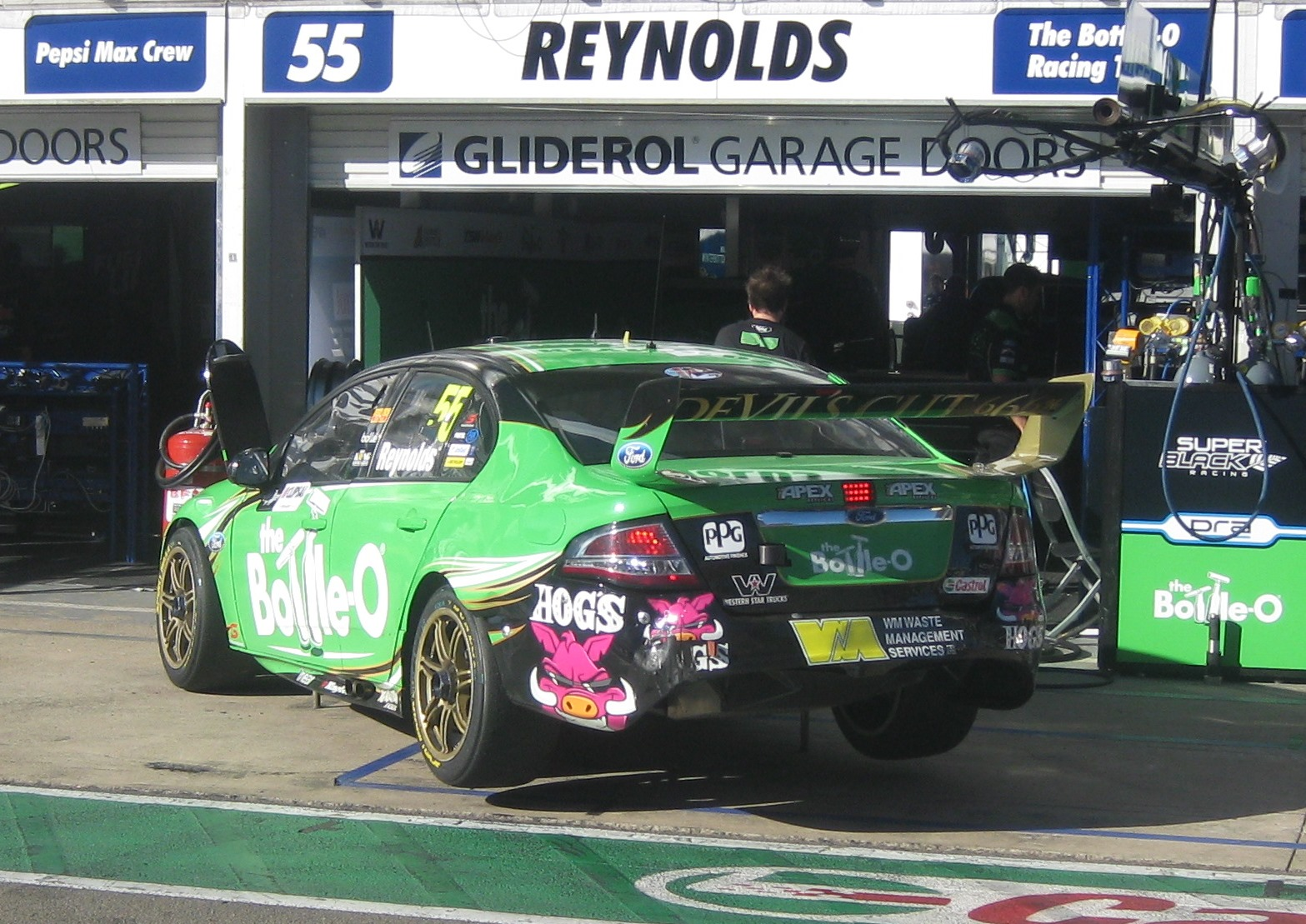
The Ford FG Falcon of David Reynolds at the 2015 Clipsal 500 Adelaide

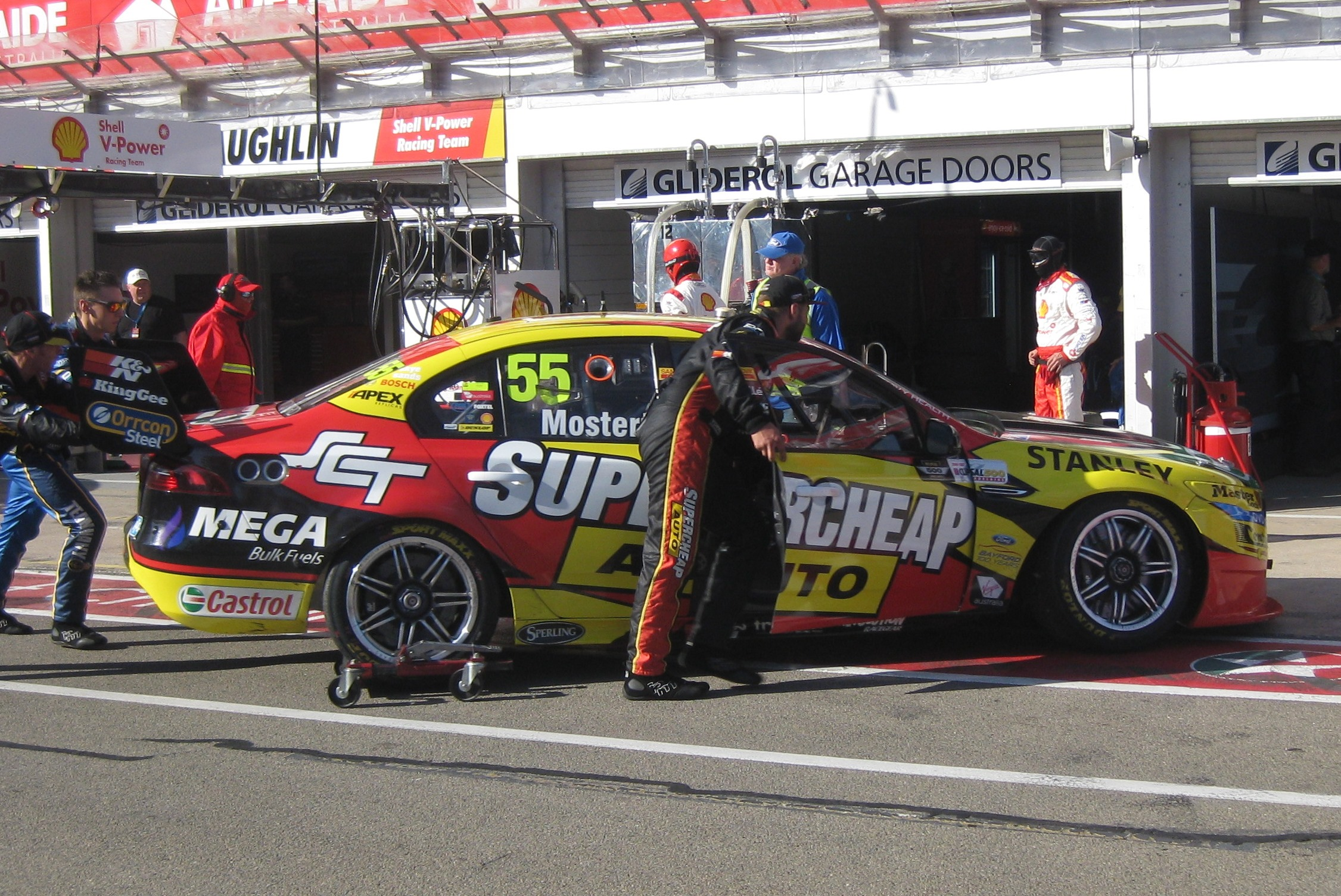
The Ford FG X Falcon of Chaz Mostert at the 2017 Clipsal 500 Adelaide

== Supercars Championship drivers ==
The following is a list of drivers who have driven for the team in V8 Supercars, in order of their first appearance. Drivers who only drove for the team on a part-time basis are listed in italics.

- (Australia) Rod Nash (1998–2001)
- (Australia) Dean Wanless (1999)
- (Australia) Cameron McConville (2000)
- (Australia) Geoff Brabham (2000)
- (Australia) Paul Dumbrell (2000, 2010–11)
- (Australia) Tony Longhurst (2001, 2006)
- (Australia) Tony Ricciardello (2001)
- (New Zealand) Craig Baird (2002)
- (Australia) Mark Noske (2002)
- (Australia) Peter Brock (2002)
- (Australia) Steve Owen (2006–07, 2016–17)
- (Australia) Tony D'Alberto (2007–09)
- (Australia) Jason Bargwanna (2008)
- (Australia) Andrew Thompson (2009)
- (Australia) Dean Canto (2010–15)
- (Canada) Jacques Villeneuve (2010)
- (Austria) Christian Klien (2011)
- (Australia) David Reynolds (2012–15)
- (Germany) Nick Heidfeld (2012)
- (Australia) Chaz Mostert (2016–17)
