= Lucas Dumbrell Motorsport =

Defunct Australian motor racing team

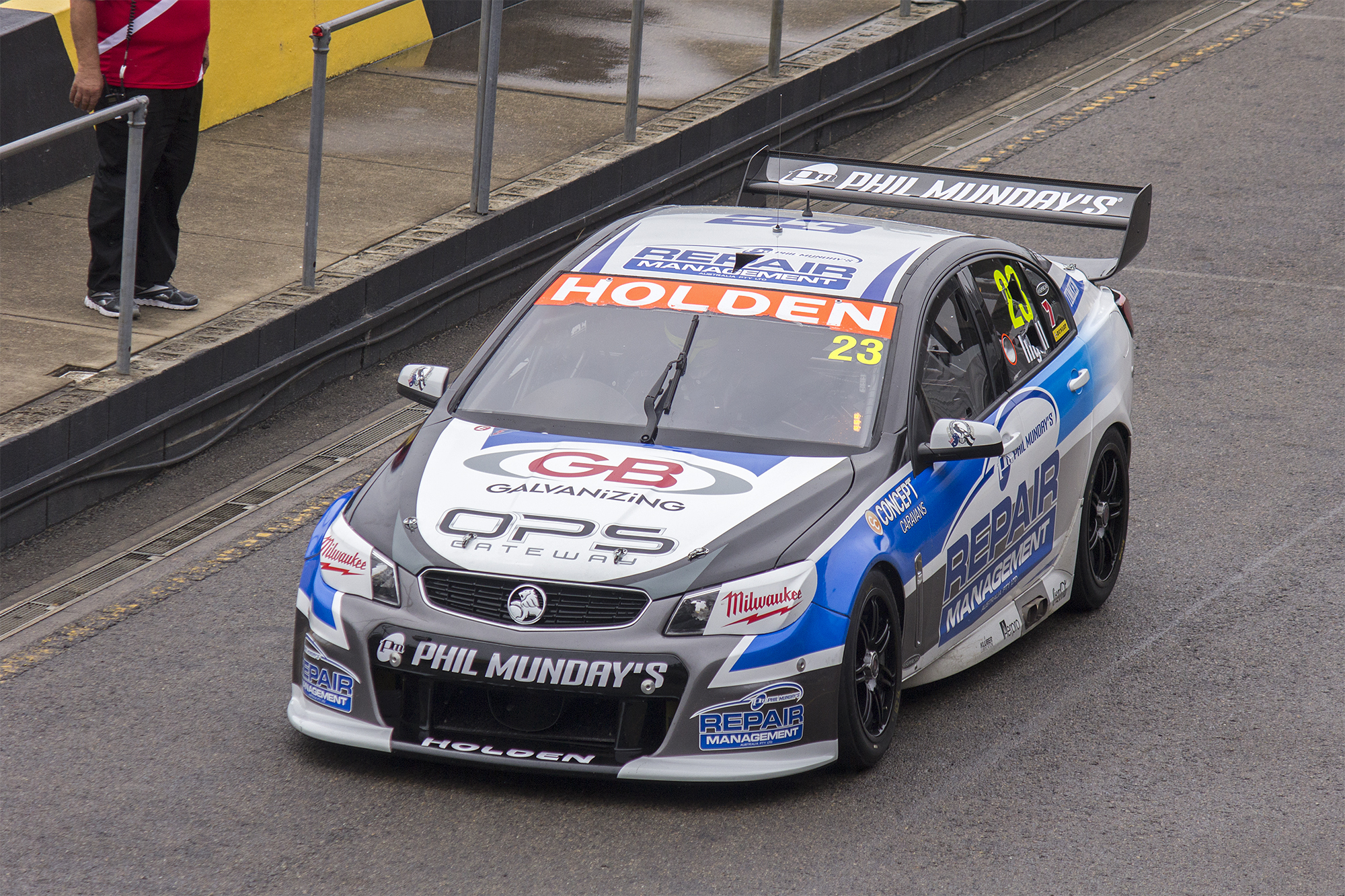
- Manufacturer: Holden
- Team Principal: Lucas Dumbrell
- Race Drivers: 3. Aaren Russell; 62. Taz Douglas
- Chassis: Holden VF Commodore
- Debut: 2010
- Drivers' Championships: 0
- Round wins: 1
- Race wins: 1
- Pole positions: 0
- 2017 position: 15th (1470 pts)

Lucas Dumbrell Motorsport was an Australian motor racing team that competed in the Virgin Australia Supercars Championship. The team was sold to Phil Munday and re-branded as 23Red Racing at the end of 2017.

== Background ==
Lucas Dumbrell comes from a strong motor racing family; both his father Garry and his brother Paul raced in open wheel and touring car racing. Garry had also owned Gibson Motorsport in 2000. Lucas was making his own way through the junior ranks of Australian motorsport when a 2008 Formula Ford accident at Oran Park Raceway left him a quadraplegic.

== Racing history ==
Dumbrell refocussed his career ambitions and began developing a V8 Supercar team to race in the 2010 season. At the end of 2009, a Racing Entitlement Contract (REC) was purchased from Tasman Motorsport, and a Holden VE Commodore was sourced from Walkinshaw Racing. Daniel Gaunt was signed to drive for the team.

In the lead-up to the 2010 Sucrogen Townsville 400, it was announced that Gaunt had left the team and been replaced in the short term by Cameron McConville. With McConville unavailable for the endurance races, the team also announced Nathan Pretty and Mark Noske as the team's drivers for the Phillip Island 500 and Bathurst 1000 endurance races, having previously announced Scott Pruett as their international driver for the Gold Coast 600. After the Gold Coast 600, it was announced Warren Luff would drive full-time for the rest of the 2010 season and in 2011. Luff remained with the team for 2011, with Nathan Pretty returning for the Phillip Island and Bathurst endurance races. For the Gold Coast 600, Marino Franchitti joined the team.

For 2012, Luff left the team and was replaced by Taz Douglas. The team purchased a Triple Eight Race Engineering-built Holden VE Commodore from Paul Morris Motorsport to run for Douglas. Scott Pye joined the team for the endurance races in his series debut.

In 2013, the team expanded to two cars, with two new VF Commodores built by Triple Eight, driven by Dean Fiore and Scott Pye. To race the second car, a REC was purchased from Paul Morris Motorsport. In 2014 the team scaled back to one car with Russell Ingall driving. The second REC was returned to V8 Supercars Australia. In the first race of the 2014 Tyrepower Tasmania 400, Ingall finished in 4th.

For the 2015 season, Tim Blanchard and former James Rosenberg Racing driver and 2011 Bathurst 1000 winner Nick Percat were signed as the team once again expanded to two cars. At the Phillip Island round, with Percat out injured, Paul Dumbrell drove for his brother's team as a substitute. Jack Perkins was used as a substitute for the final round, the Sydney 500.

In the 2016 season, Andre Heimgartner replaced Blanchard in the team's line-up, alongside Percat. Their season began with near-immediate success, with Percat winning a chaotic Sunday race at the 2016 Clipsal 500 Adelaide, and therefore winning the Clipsal 500 title. The win was the team's first, and Percat's first individual win having previously won the 2011 Supercheap Auto Bathurst 1000 with Garth Tander.

== Gallery ==
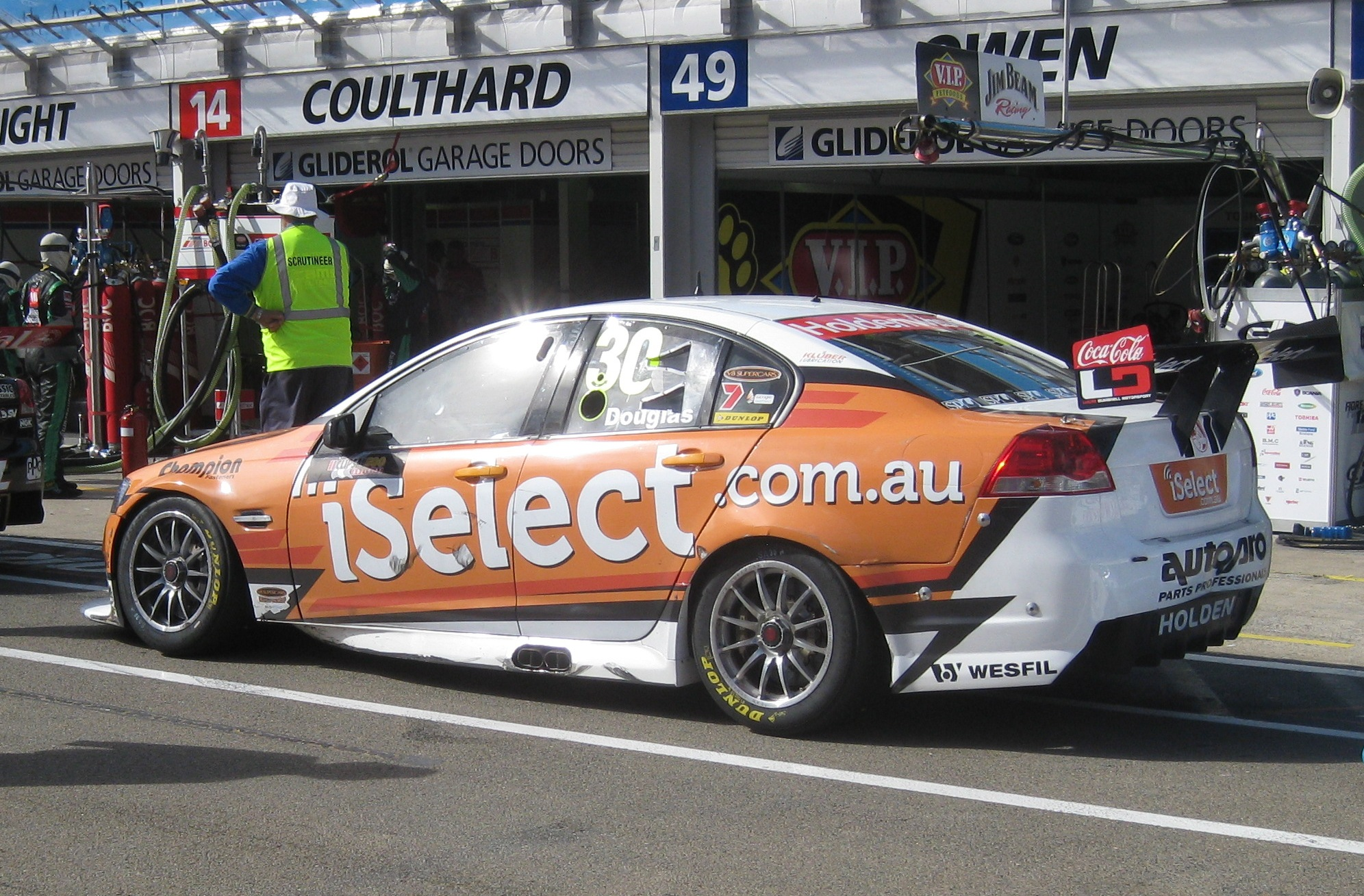
The Holden VE Commodore of Taz Douglas at the 2012 Clipsal 500.

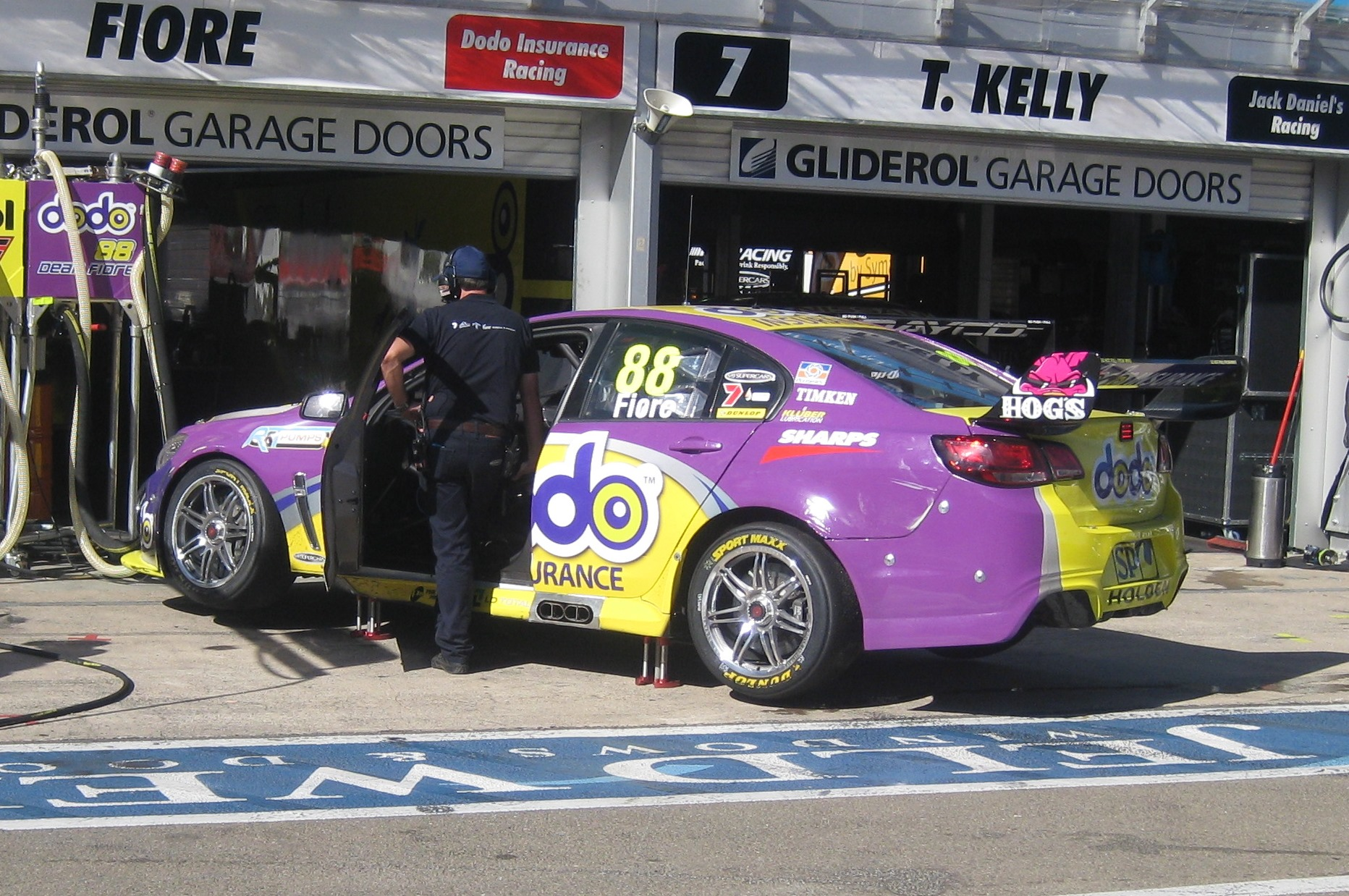
The Holden VF Commodore of Dean Fiore at the 2013 Clipsal 500.

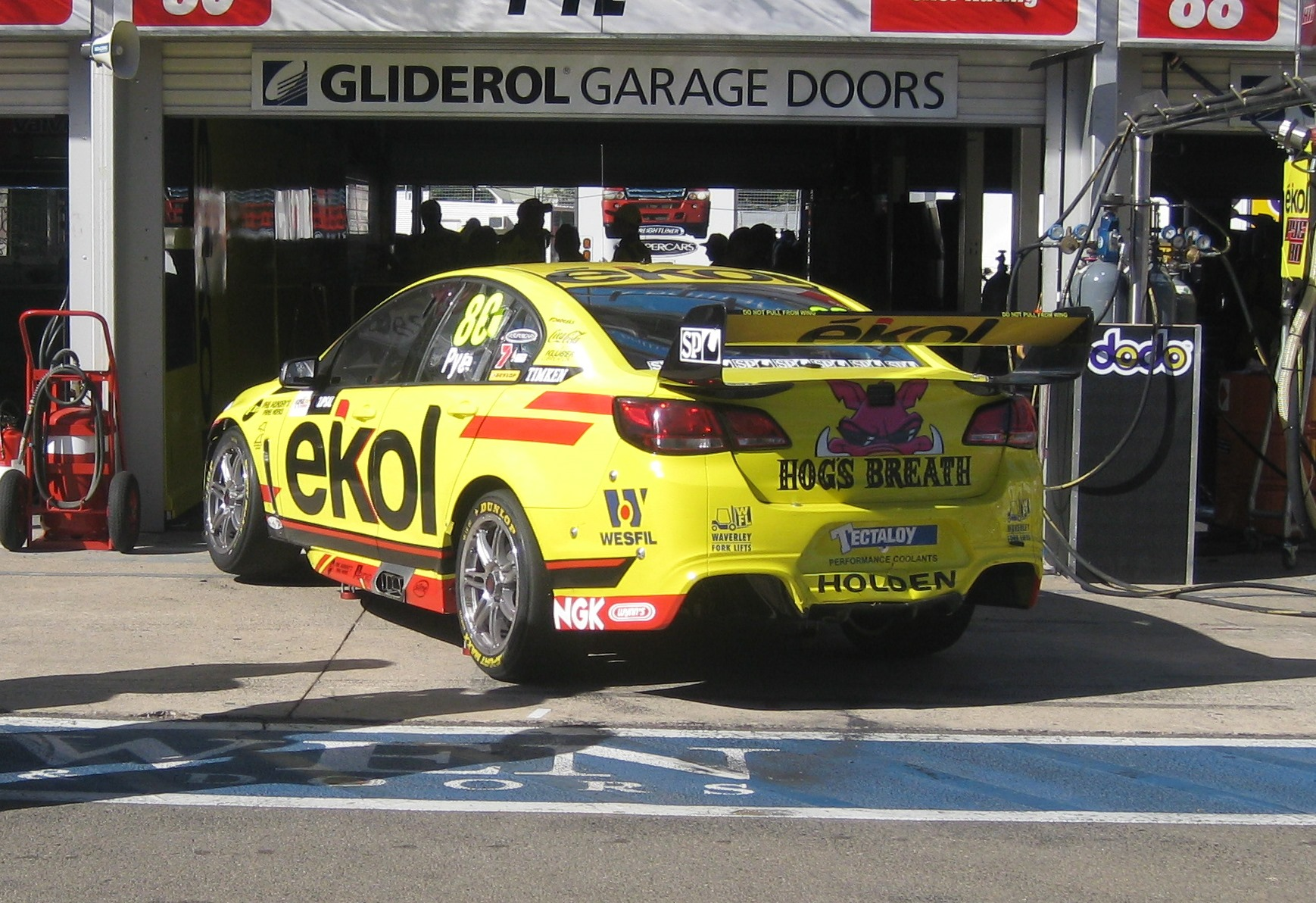
The Holden VF Commodore of Scott Pye at the 2013 Clipsal 500.

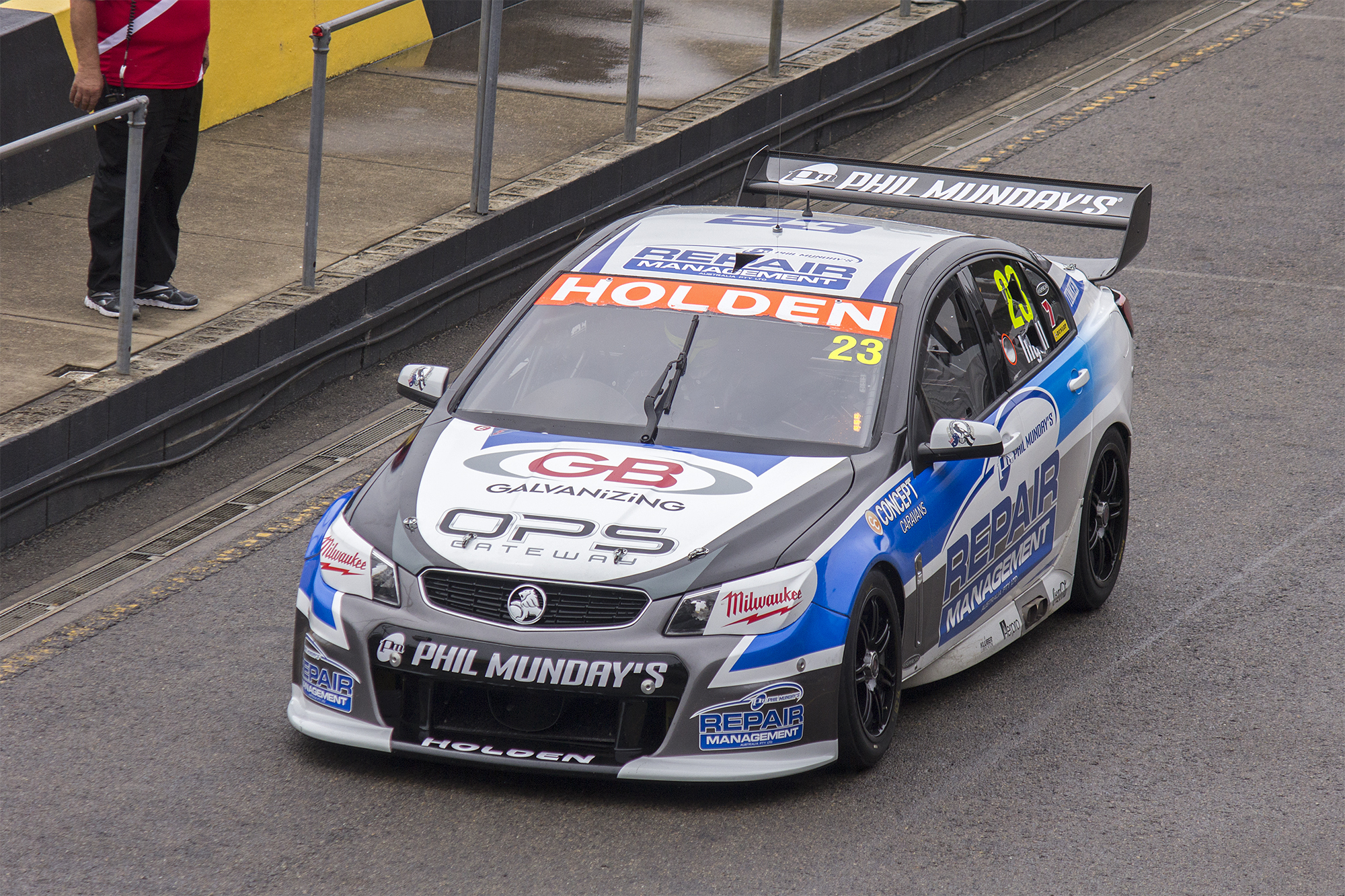
The Holden VF Commodore of Russell Ingall at Sydney Motorsport Park in February 2014.

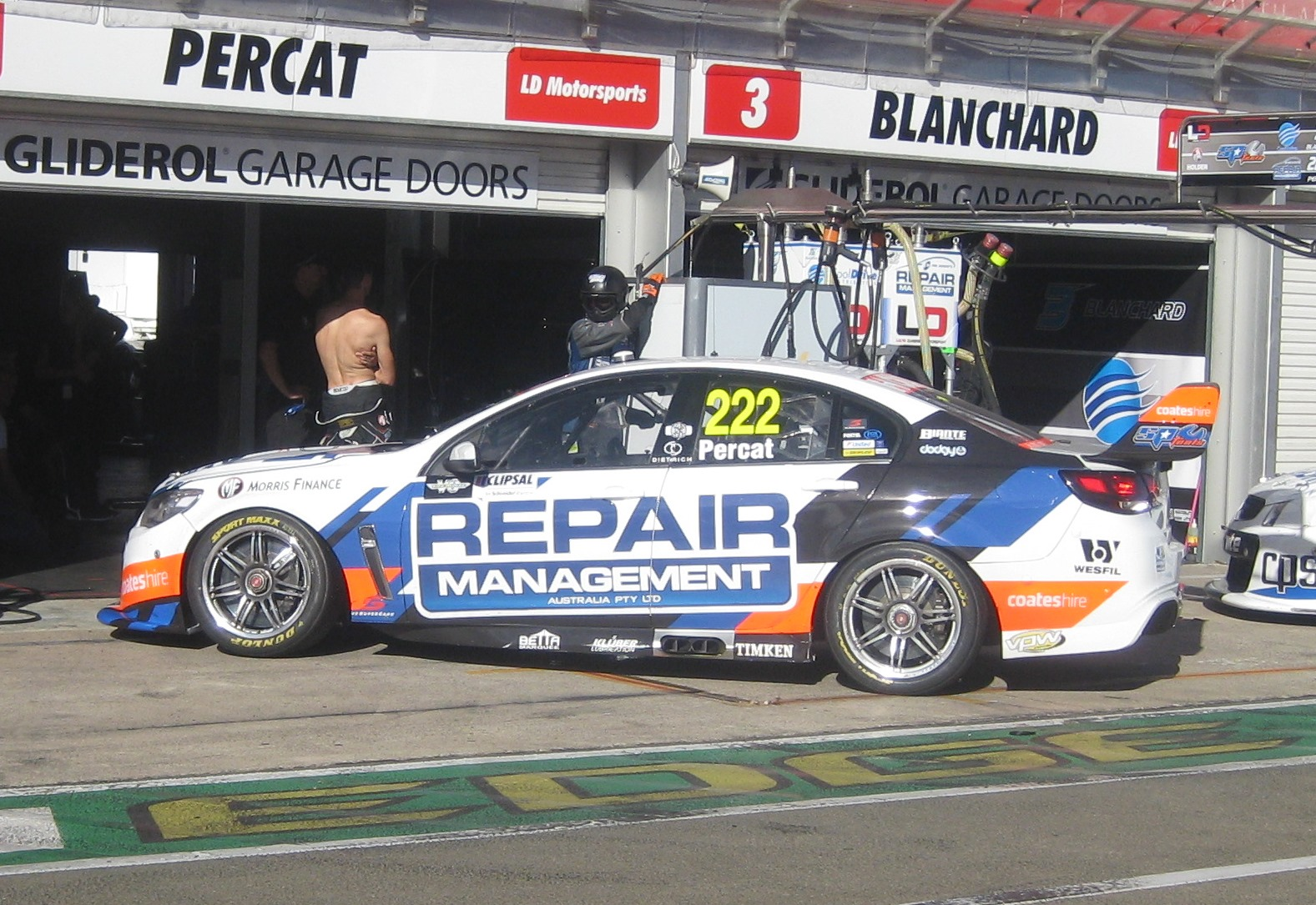
The Holden VF Commodore of Nick Percat at the 2015 Clipsal 500 Adelaide

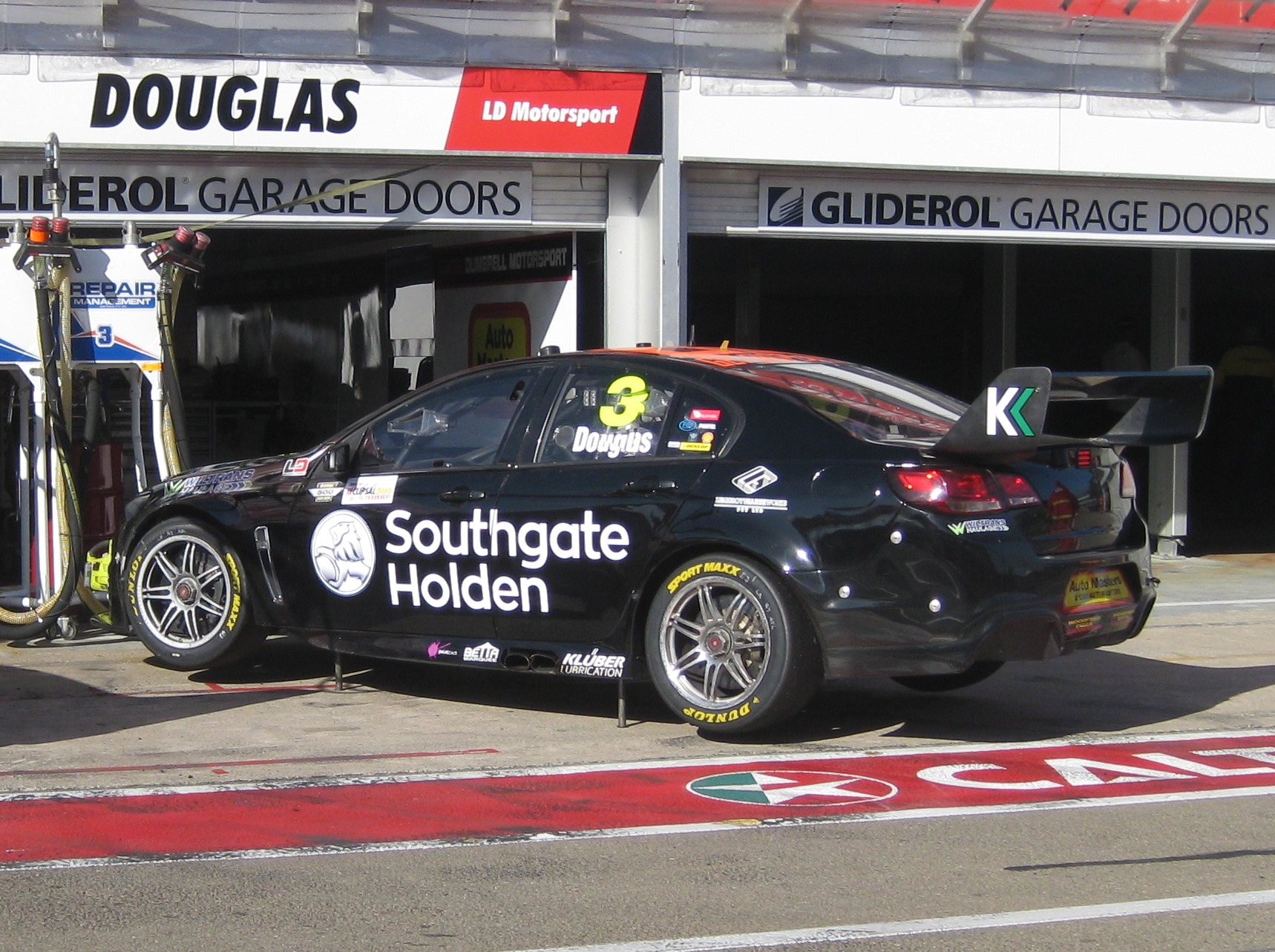
The Holden VF Commodore of Taz Douglas at the 2017 Clipsal 500 Adelaide

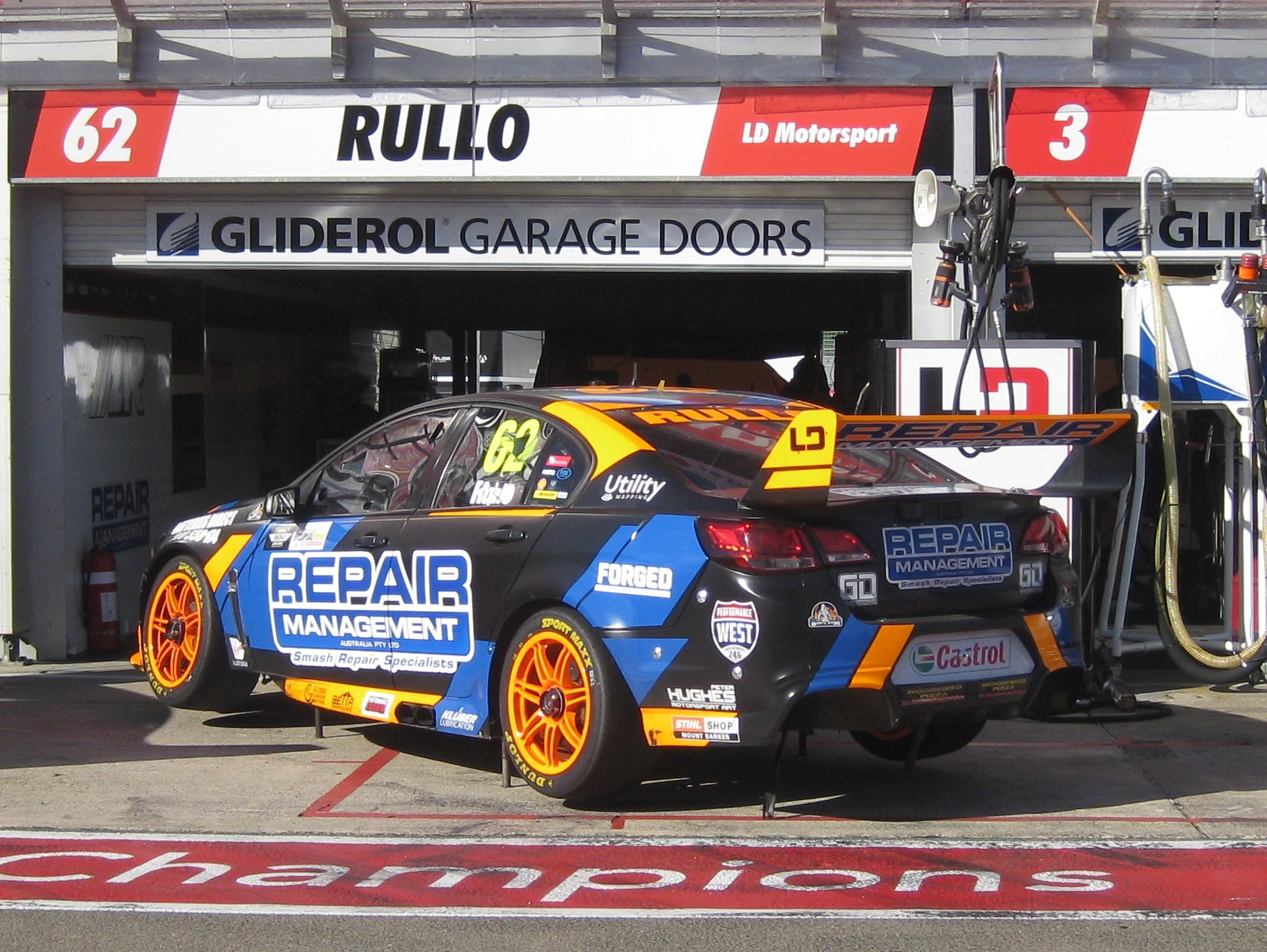
The Holden VF Commodore of Alex Rullo at the 2017 Clipsal 500 Adelaide

== Supercars Championship drivers ==
The following is a list of drivers who have driven for the team in V8 Supercars, in order of their first appearance. Drivers who only drove for the team on a part-time basis are listed in italics.

- (Australia) Daniel Gaunt (2010)
- (Australia) Cameron McConville (2010, 2016–17)
- (Australia) Mark Noske (2010)
- (Australia) Nathan Pretty (2010–11)
- (United States) Scott Pruett (2010)
- (Australia) Warren Luff (2010–11)
- (United Kingdom) Marino Franchitti (2011)
- (Australia) Taz Douglas (2012, 2017)
- (Australia) Scott Pye (2012–13)
- (United Kingdom) Mike Conway (2012)
- (Australia) Dean Fiore (2013)
- (Australia) Paul Morris (2013)
- (New Zealand) Matt Halliday (2013)
- (Australia) Russell Ingall (2014)
- (Australia) Tim Blanchard (2014–15)
- (Australia) Nick Percat (2015–16)
- (Australia) Karl Reindler (2015)
- (United Kingdom) Oliver Gavin (2015)
- (Australia) Paul Dumbrell (2015)
- (Australia) Jack Perkins (2015, 2017)
- (New Zealand) Andre Heimgartner (2016)
- (Australia) Alex Rullo (2017)
- (Australia) Alex Davison (2017)
- (Australia) Matthew Brabham (2017)
- (Australia) Aaren Russell (2016–17)

== See also ==
- Sam Schmidt Motorsports – Another motorsport team founded by a quadriplegic ex-racing driver.
