= James Moffat (racing driver) =

Australian professional racing driver (born 1984)

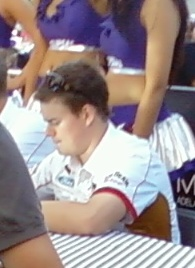
- Moffat in 2011
- Nationality: Australian
- Born: James Evan Moffat; 18 June 1984 (age 42) Melbourne, Victoria, Australia

Supercars Championship career
- Current team: Garry Rogers Motorsport (Endurance race co-driver)
- Championships: 0
- Races: 240
- Wins: 2
- Podiums: 6
- Pole positions: 1

James Evan Moffat (born 18 June 1984) is an Australian professional racing driver who competed in the Virgin Australia Supercars Championship. In 2018, he drove for Wall Racing in the Porsche Carrera Cup Australia Championship. Moffat also races as a co-driver for Tickford Racing in the Pirtek Enduro Cup in a Ford Mustang GT, alongside Thomas Randle.

== Biography ==
Moffat, son of touring car legend Allan Moffat, first appeared as a racing driver at club level before moving up to national level racing in a one-make series for Lotus Elise production cars, finishing runner-up in a tight championship fight, before graduating into V8 Utes in 2005.

After a lean 2006, Moffat returned in 2007 in a Sonic Motor Racing Services liveried Mygale in the Australian Formula Ford Championship and despite little previous open wheel experience finished third in the championship in his rookie season. With the same team. Moffat progressed to the Carrera Cup where he again ran at the front of the field, competing against his half-brother Andrew Moffat, among others.

Co-inciding with the collapse of Carrera Cup, Moffat moved into Team Sonic's newly established V8 Supercar program and finished second in the 2009 Fujitsu V8 Supercar series. At the season ending V8 Supercar prizegiving Moffat received the Mike Kable Young Gun Award, recognition of his efforts as a first year V8 Supercar driver.

In late January 2011, Dick Johnson Racing announced the signing of Moffat to pilot the number 18 car vacated by the HRT-bound James Courtney. It was the first time in 22 years that the Moffat name has competed in the top level of Australian Touring Car racing.

Moffat remained with DJR for the following year before joining Kelly Racing as the team transitioned to Nissan Motorsport racing Nissan Altimas. Moffat quickly established himself within the new team, coming home first ahead of team-mate Michael Caruso at Winton.

Moffat's second placing with co-driver Taz Douglas at the 2014 Bathurst 1000 is his best finish to date at Mount Panorama—a remarkable achievement considering his Altima made contact with the tyre wall at the top of Mountain Straight on two occasions during the race.

== Career results ==
Season	Series	Position	Car	Team
2004	Australian Lotus Trophy	2nd	Lotus Elise	Trueline Pty Ltd / PIMM
2005	Australian V8 Utes Series	7th	Ford BA Falcon XR8 Ute	Allan Grice Racing
2007	Australian Formula Ford Championship	3rd	Mygale SJ07A	Sonic Motor Racing Services
2008	Australian Carrera Cup Championship	3rd	Porsche 997 GT3 Cup	Sonic Motor Racing Services
2009	Fujitsu V8 Supercar Series	2nd	Ford Falcon (BF)	Sonic Motor Racing Services
2010	Fujitsu V8 Supercar Series	3rd	Ford Falcon (BF)	Ford Performance Racing
2010	V8 Supercar Championship Series	46th	Ford Falcon (FG)	Ford Performance Racing
2011	International V8 Supercars Championship	23rd	Ford Falcon (FG)	Dick Johnson Racing
2012	International V8 Supercars Championship	21st	Ford Falcon (FG)	Dick Johnson Racing
2013	International V8 Supercars Championship	18th	Nissan Altima L33	Nissan Motorsport
2014	International V8 Supercars Championship	16th	Nissan Altima L33	Nissan Motorsport
2015	International V8 Supercars Championship	18th	Nissan Altima L33	Nissan Motorsport
2016	International V8 Supercars Championship	20th	Volvo S60	Garry Rogers Motorsport
2017	Virgin Australia Supercars Championship	17th	Holden Commodore (VF)	Garry Rogers Motorsport
2018	Porsche Carrera Cup Australia	6th	Porsche 911 Cup	Wall Racing
2018	Virgin Australia Supercars Championship	30th	Ford FG X Falcon	Tickford Racing
2019	Virgin Australia Supercars Championship	40th	Ford Mustang GT	Tickford Racing
2020	Supercars Championship	39th	Ford Mustang GT	Tickford Racing
2021	TCR Australia	8th	Renault Mégane R.S TCR	Garry Rogers Motorsport
2021	Supercars Championship	29th	Ford Mustang GT	Tickford Racing
2021	Australian National Trans-Am Series	30th	Ford Mustang	Garry Rogers Motorsport
2022	TCR Australia	14th	Renault Mégane R.S TCR	Garry Rogers Motorsport
2022	Repco Supercars Championship	30th	Ford Mustang GT	Tickford Racing
2023	Australian National Trans-Am Series	1st	Ford Mustang	Garry Rogers Motorsport
2023	Repco Supercars Championship	54th	Ford Mustang S650	Tickford Racing
2024	Australian National Trans-Am Series	2nd	Ford Mustang	Garry Rogers Motorsport
2024	Repco Supercars Championship	30th	Ford Mustang S650	Tickford Racing
2025	Australian National Trans-Am Series	5th	Ford Mustang	Garry Rogers Motorsport
2025	Repco Supercars Championship	40th	Ford Mustang S650	Tickford Racing

=== Super2 Series results ===
Super2 Series results
Year	Team	No.	Car	1	2	3	4	5	6	7	8	9	10	11	12	13	14	15	16	17	18	Position	Points
2009	Sonic Motor Racing Services	999	Ford BF Falcon	ADE; R1; 1	ADE; R2; 3	WIN; R3; Ret	WIN; R4; 8	WIN; R5; 7	TOW; R6; 1	TOW; R7; 3	TOW; R8; 1	SAN; R9; 1	SAN; R10; Ret	SAN; R11; 2	QLD; R12; 3	QLD; R13; 8	QLD; R14; 3	BAT; R15; 9	BAT; R16; 2	SYD; R17; 1	SYD; R18; 2	2nd	1623
2010	Ford Rising Stars Racing	99	Ford BF Falcon	ADE; R1; 2	ADE; R2; 2	QLD; R3; 15	QLD; R4; 9	QLD; R5; Ret	WIN; R6; 3	WIN; R7; 5	WIN; R8; Ret	TOW; R9; 2	TOW; R10; Ret	TOW; R11; 7	BAT; R12; 4	BAT; R13; 2	SAN; R14; 3	SAN; R15; 3	SAN; R16; 2	SYD; R17; 3	SYD; R18; 3	3rd	1473

=== Supercars Championship results ===
Supercars results
Year	Team	No.	Car	1	2	3	4	5	6	7	8	9	10	11	12	13	14	15	16	17	18	19	20	21	22	23	24	25	26	27	28	29	30	31	32	33	34	35	36	37	38	39	Position	Points
2010	Ford Performance Racing	6	Ford FG Falcon	YMC; R1	YMC; R2	BHR; R3	BHR; R4	ADE; R5	ADE; R6	HAM; R7	HAM; R8	QLD; R9; PO	QLD; R10; PO	WIN; R11; PO	WIN; R12; PO	HDV; R13	HDV; R14	TOW; R15	TOW; R16	PHI; QR; 24	PHI; R17; 21	BAT; R18; 11	SUR; R19	SUR; R20	SYM; R21	SYM; R22	SAN; R23	SAN; R24	SYD; R25	SYD; R26													46th	251
2011	Dick Johnson Racing	18	Ford FG Falcon	YMC; R1; 16	YMC; R2; Ret	ADE; R3; Ret	ADE; R4; 22	HAM; R5; 9	HAM; R6; 17	BAR; R7; 18	BAR; R8; 17	BAR; R9; 21	WIN; R10; 19	WIN; R11; 9	HID; R12; 14	HID; R13; 13	TOW; R14; 17	TOW; R15; 15	QLD; R16; 10	QLD; R17; 9	QLD; R18; 4	PHI; QR; 24	PHI; R19; 25	BAT; R20; 25	SUR; R21; 4	SUR; R22; Ret	SYM; R23; 20	SYM; R24; 18	SAN; R25; Ret	SAN; R26; 25	SYD; R27; 8	SYD; R28; Ret											23rd	1306
2012	Dick Johnson Racing	18	Ford FG Falcon	ADE; R1; 15	ADE; R2; Ret	SYM; R3; 14	SYM; R4; 19	HAM; R5; Ret	HAM; R6; 18	BAR; R7; Ret	BAR; R8; 24	BAR; R9; 22	PHI; R10; Ret	PHI; R11; 16	HID; R12; 21	HID; R13; Ret	TOW; R14; 13	TOW; R15; 23	QLD; R16; 18	QLD; R17; 19	SMP; R18; 19	SMP; R19; 16	SAN; QR; 11	SAN; R20; 26	BAT; R21; 10	SUR; R22; Ret	SUR; R23; Ret	YMC; R24; 9	YMC; R25; 13	YMC; R26; 6	WIN; R27; 5	WIN; R28; 17	SYD; R29; 8	SYD; R30; 22									21st	1354
2013	Nissan Motorsport	360	Nissan Altima L33	ADE; R1; 14	ADE; R2; 13	SYM; R3; 19	SYM; R4; 20	SYM; R5; 15	PUK; R6; 22	PUK; R7; 9	PUK; R8; 13	PUK; R9; 10	BAR; R10; 10	BAR; R11; 10	BAR; R12; 8	COA; R13; 16	COA; R14; 10	COA; R15; 17	COA; R16; 14	HID; R17; 15	HID; R18; 23	HID; R19; Ret	TOW; R20; 15	TOW; R21; 14	QLD; R22; 10	QLD; R23; 23	QLD; R24; 12	WIN; R25; 1	WIN; R26; 11	WIN; R27; 8	SAN; QR; 20	SAN; R28; 26	BAT; R29; 18	SUR; R30; Ret	SUR; R31; Ret	PHI; R32; Ret	PHI; R33; 21	PHI; R34; 7	SYD; R35; 20	SYD; R36; Ret			18th	1448
2014	Nissan Motorsport	360	Nissan Altima L33	ADE; R1; 20	ADE; R2; 12	ADE; R3; 9	SYM; R4; 18	SYM; R5; 12	SYM; R6; 22	WIN; R7; 18	WIN; R8; 6	WIN; R9; 9	PUK; R10; 10	PUK; R11; 15	PUK; R12; 8	PUK; R13; 16	BAR; R14; 21	BAR; R15; 21	BAR; R16; 8	HID; R17; 11	HID; R18; Ret	HID; R19; 7	TOW; R20; 21	TOW; R21; 18	TOW; R22; 16	QLD; R23; Ret	QLD; R24; 13	QLD; R25; 5	SMP; R26; 12	SMP; R27; 6	SMP; R28; 4	SAN; QR; 22	SAN; R29; Ret	BAT; R30; 2	SUR; R31; 13	SUR; R32; Ret	PHI; R33; 18	PHI; R34; 11	PHI; R35; 18	SYD; R36; 14	SYD; R37; 17	SYD; R38; 15	16th	1734
2015	Nissan Motorsport	99	Nissan Altima L33	ADE; R1; 11	ADE; R2; 7	ADE; R3; Ret	SYM; R4; 12	SYM; R5; 19	SYM; R6; 22	BAR; R7; 13	BAR; R8; 20	BAR; R9; 7	WIN; R10; 17	WIN; R11; 22	WIN; R12; 19	HID; R13; 4	HID; R14; 11	HID; R15; 14	TOW; R16; 11	TOW; R17; 17	QLD; R18; DSQ	QLD; R19; DSQ	QLD; R20; 10	SMP; R21; 12	SMP; R22; 18	SMP; R23; Ret	SAN; QR; 20	SAN; R24; 18	BAT; R25; 10	SUR; R26; 10	SUR; R27; 8	PUK; R28; 11	PUK; R29; 14	PUK; R30; 14	PHI; R31; 5	PHI; R32; 14	PHI; R33; 8	SYD; R34; 24	SYD; R35; Ret	SYD; R36; 16			18th	1643
2016	Garry Rogers Motorsport	34	Volvo S60	ADE; R1; 17	ADE; R2; 15	ADE; R3; 22	SYM; R4; 20	SYM; R5; 16	PHI; R6; 7	PHI; R7; 15	BAR; R8; 14	BAR; R9; 17	WIN; R10; 26	WIN; R11; 19	HID; R12; Ret	HID; R13; 10	TOW; R14; 17	TOW; R15; 19	QLD; R16; 9	QLD; R17; 11	SMP; R18; 12	SMP; R19; 18	SAN; QR; 4	SAN; R20; Ret	BAT; R21; Ret	SUR; R22; 5	SUR; R23; 12	PUK; R24; 20	PUK; R25; 14	PUK; R26; 12	PUK; R27; 10	SYD; R28; 24	SYD; R29; 10										20th	1419
2017	Garry Rogers Motorsport	34	Holden VF Commodore	ADE; R1; 10	ADE; R2; 16	SYM; R3; Ret	SYM; R4; 19	PHI; R5; 14	PHI; R6; 4	BAR; R7; 12	BAR; R8; 11	WIN; R9; 19	WIN; R10; 16	HID; R11; 9	HID; R12; 25	TOW; R13; 13	TOW; R14; 7	QLD; R15; 28	QLD; R16; 14	SMP; R17; DSQ	SMP; R18; 17	SAN; QR; 16	SAN; R19; 7	BAT; R20; Ret	SUR; R21; 18	SUR; R22; 19	PUK; R23; 13	PUK; R24; 9	NEW; R25; Ret	NEW; R26; 13													17th	1542
2018	Tickford Racing	55	Ford FG X Falcon	ADE; R1	ADE; R2	MEL; R3	MEL; R4	MEL; R5	MEL; R6	SYM; R7	SYM; R8	PHI; R9	PHI; R10	BAR; R11	BAR; R12	WIN; R13; PO	WIN; R14; PO	HID; R15; PO	HID; R16; PO	TOW; R17	TOW; R18	QLD; R19; PO	QLD; R20; PO	SMP; R21	BEN; R22	BEN; R23	SAN; QR; 10	SAN; R24; 10	BAT; R25; 4	SUR; R26; 1	SUR; R27; C	PUK; R28	PUK; R29	NEW; R30	NEW; R31								30th	546
2019	Tickford Racing	55	Ford Mustang S550	ADE; R1	ADE; R2	MEL; R3	MEL; R4	MEL; R5	MEL; R6	SYM; R7; PO	SYM; R8; PO	PHI; R9	PHI; R10	BAR; R11	BAR; R12	WIN; R13; PO	WIN; R14; PO	HID; R15	HID; R16	TOW; R17	TOW; R18	QLD; R19	QLD; R20	BEN; R21; PO	BEN; R22; PO	PUK; R23	PUK; R24	BAT; R25; 15	SUR; R26; DNS	SUR; R27; DNS	SAN; QR; Ret	SAN; R28; 2	NEW; R29	NEW; R30									40th	350
2020	Tickford Racing	55	Ford Mustang S550	ADE; R1	ADE; R2	MEL; R3	MEL; R4	MEL; R5	MEL; R6	SMP1; R7	SMP1; R8	SMP1; R9	SMP2; R10	SMP2; R11	SMP2; R12	HID1; R13	HID1; R14	HID1; R15	HID2; R16	HID2; R17	HID2; R18	TOW1; R19	TOW1; R20	TOW1; R21	TOW2; R22	TOW2; R23	TOW2; R24	BEN1; R25	BEN1; R26	BEN1; R27	BEN2; R28	BEN2; R29	BEN2; R30	BAT; R31; 14									39th	126
2021	Tickford Racing	6	Ford Mustang S550	BAT1; R1	BAT1; R2	SAN; R3	SAN; R4	SAN; R5	SYM; R6	SYM; R7	SYM; R8	BEN; R9	BEN; R10	BEN; R11	HID; R12	HID; R13	HID; R14	TOW1; R15	TOW1; R16	TOW2; R17	TOW2; R18	TOW2; R19	SMP1; R20	SMP1; R21	SMP1; R22	SMP2; R23	SMP2; R24	SMP2; R25	SMP3; R26	SMP3; R27	SMP3; R28	SMP4; R29; PO	SMP4; R30; PO	BAT2; R31; 2									29th	276
2022	Tickford Racing	6	Ford Mustang S550	SMP; R1	SMP; R2	SYM; R3	SYM; R4	SYM; R5	MEL; R6	MEL; R7	MEL; R8	MEL; R9	BAR; R10	BAR; R11	BAR; R12	WIN; R13	WIN; R14	WIN; R15	HID; R16	HID; R17	HID; R18	TOW; R19	TOW; R20	BEN; R21	BEN; R22	BEN; R23	SAN; R24; PO	SAN; R25; PO	SAN; R26; PO	PUK; R27	PUK; R28	PUK; R29	BAT; R30; 3	SUR; R31	SUR; R32	NEW; R33	NEW; R34						30th	258
2023	Tickford Racing	6	Ford Mustang S650	NEW; R1	NEW; R2	MEL; R3	MEL; R4	MEL; R5	MEL; R6	BAR; R7	BAR; R8	BAR; R9	SYM; R10	SYM; R11	SYM; R12	HID; R13	HID; R14	HID; R15	TOW; R16	TOW; R17	SMP; R18	SMP; R19	BEN; R20	BEN; R21	BEN; R22	SAN; R23; 20	BAT; R24; Ret	SUR; R25	SUR; R26	ADE; R27	ADE; R28												56th	90
2024	Tickford Racing	6	Ford Mustang S650	BAT1; R1	BAT1; R2	MEL; R3	MEL; R4	MEL; R5	MEL; R6	TAU; R7	TAU; R8	BAR; R9	BAR; R10	HID; R11	HID; R12	TOW; R13	TOW; R14	SMP; R15	SMP; R16	SYM; R17	SYM; R18	SAN; R19; 6	BAT2; R20; 4	SUR; R21	SUR; R22	ADE; R23	ADE; R24																30th	444
2025	Tickford Racing	55	Ford Mustang S650	SYD; R1	SYD; R2	SYD; R3	MEL; R4	MEL; R5	MEL; R6	MEL; R7	TAU; R8	TAU; R9	TAU; R10	SYM; R11	SYM; R12	SYM; R13	BAR; R14	BAR; R15	BAR; R16	HID; R17	HID; R18	HID; R19	TOW; R20	TOW; R21	TOW; R22	QLD; R23	QLD; R24	QLD; R25	BEN; R26; 9	BAT; R27; 11	SUR; R28	SUR; R29	SAN; R30	SAN; R31	ADE; R32	ADE; R33	ADE; R34						35th	284
2026	Garry Rogers Motorsport	34	Chevrolet Camaro ZL1	SMP; R1	SMP; R2	SMP; R3	MEL; R4	MEL; R5	MEL; R6	MEL; R7	TAU; R8	TAU; R9	CHR; R10	CHR; R11	CHR; R12	CHR; R13	SYM; R14	SYM; R15	SYM; R16	HID; R20	HID; R21	HID; R22	TOW; R23	TOW; R24	TOW; R25	BAR; R17	BAR; R18	BAR; R19	QLD; R26	QLD; R27	QLD; R28	BEN; R28	BAT; R30; 19	SUR; R31	SUR; R32	SAN; R33	SAN; R34	ADE; R35	ADE; R36	ADE; R37			53rd	67

=== Bathurst 1000 results ===
Year	Team	Car	Co-driver	Position	Laps
2010	Ford Performance Racing	Ford Falcon FG	(New Zealand) Steven Richards	11th	161
2011	Dick Johnson Racing	Ford Falcon FG	(New Zealand) Matthew Halliday	25th	146
2012	Dick Johnson Racing	Ford Falcon FG	(Australia) Alex Davison	10th	161
2013	Nissan Motorsport	Nissan Altima L33	(Australia) Taz Douglas	18th	161
2014	Nissan Motorsport	Nissan Altima L33	(Australia) Taz Douglas	2nd	161
2015	Nissan Motorsport	Nissan Altima L33	(Australia) Taz Douglas	10th	161
2016	Garry Rogers Motorsport	Volvo S60	(Australia) James Golding	DNF	108
2017	Garry Rogers Motorsport	Holden Commodore VF	(Australia) Richard Muscat	DNF	141
2018	Tickford Racing	Ford Falcon FG X	(Australia) Chaz Mostert	4th	161
2019	Tickford Racing	Ford Mustang S550	(Australia) Chaz Mostert	15th	160
2020	Tickford Racing	Ford Mustang S550	(Australia) Jack Le Brocq	14th	161
2021	Tickford Racing	Ford Mustang S550	(Australia) Cameron Waters	2nd	161
2022	Tickford Racing	Ford Mustang S550	(Australia) Cameron Waters	3rd	161
2023	Tickford Racing	Ford Mustang S650	(Australia) Cameron Waters	DNF	70
2024	Tickford Racing	Ford Mustang S650	(Australia) Cameron Waters	4th	161
2025	Tickford Racing	Ford Mustang S650	(Australia) Thomas Randle	11th	161
2026	Garry Rogers Motorsport	Chevrolet Camaro ZL1	(Australia) Nathan Herne	19th	159

== Gallery ==
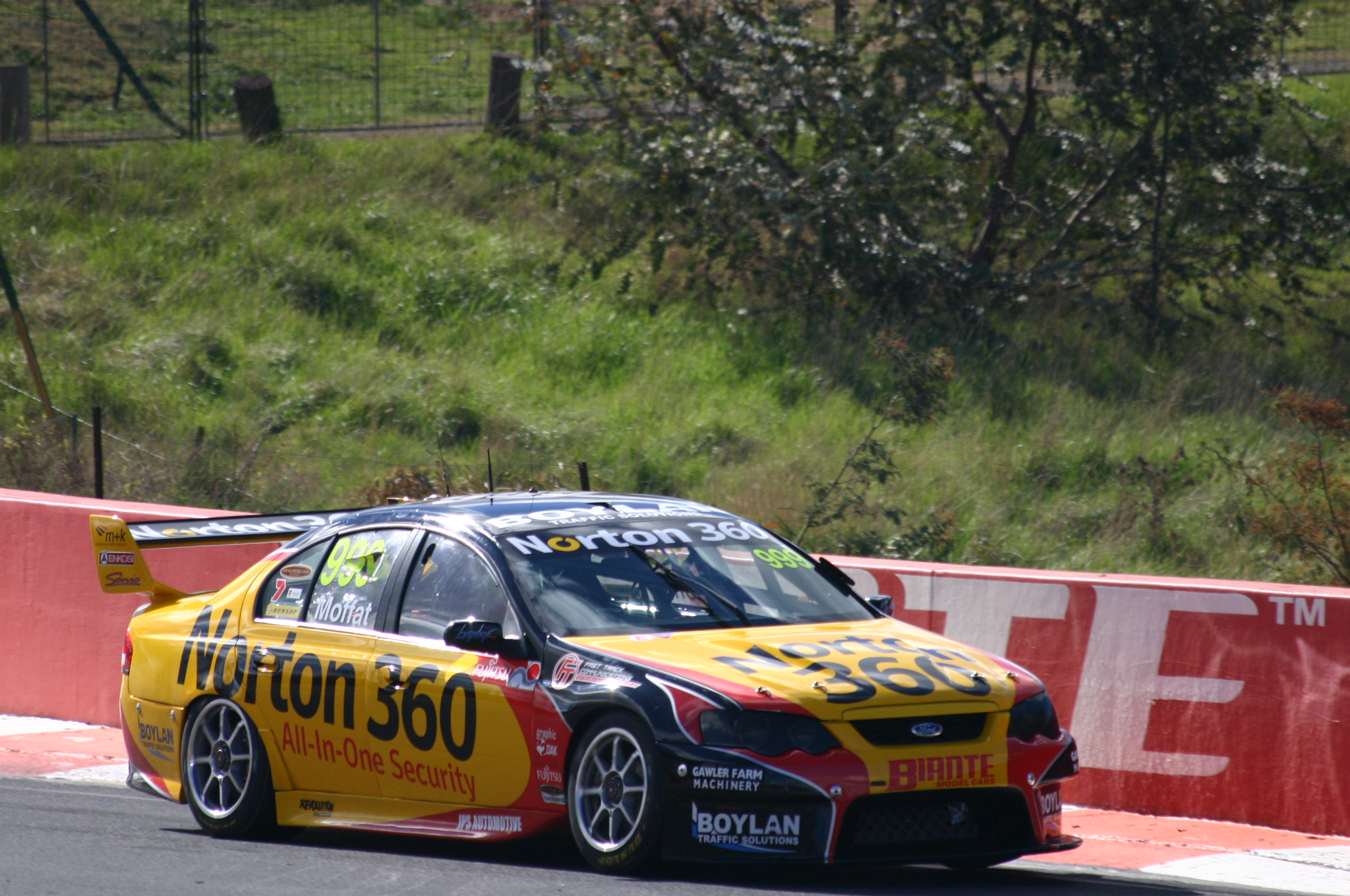
Moffat drove a Ford Falcon (BF) to 2nd place in the 2009 Fujitsu V8 Supercar Series.

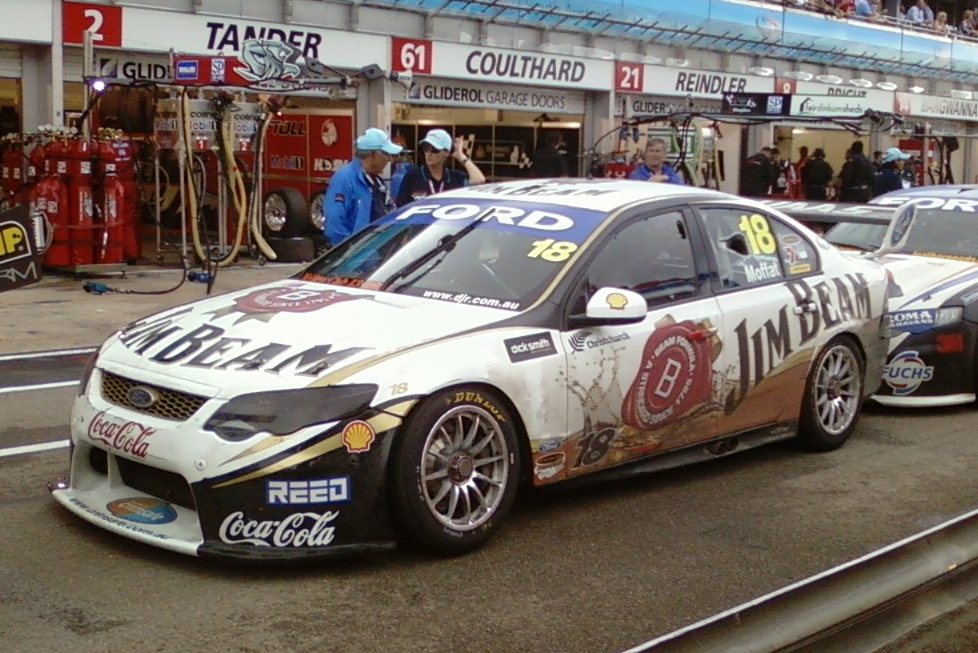
Moffat placed 23rd in a Ford Falcon (FG) in the 2011 V8 Supercars Championship.

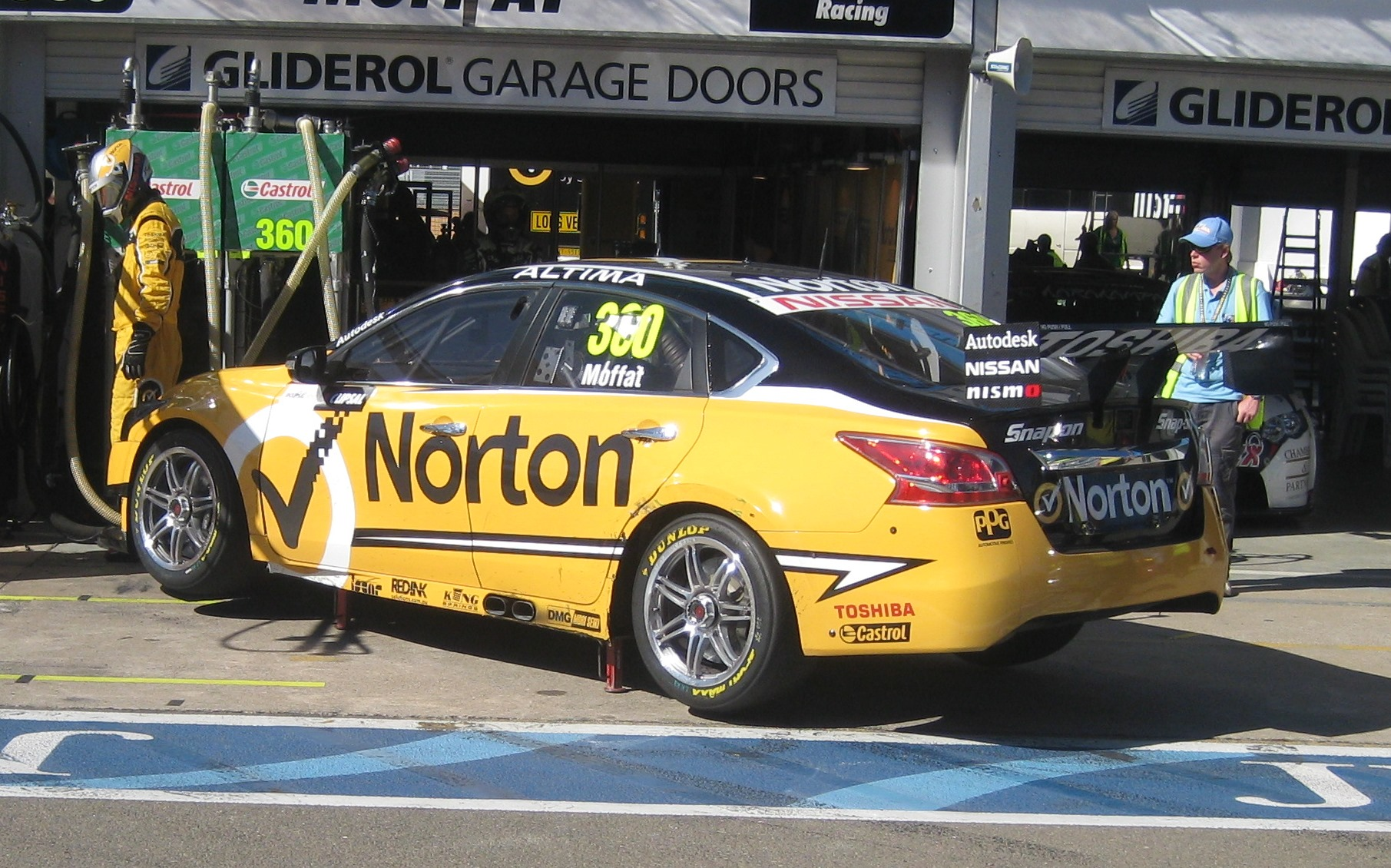
Moffat placed 18th in the 2013 V8 Supercars Championship driving a Nissan L33 Altima.

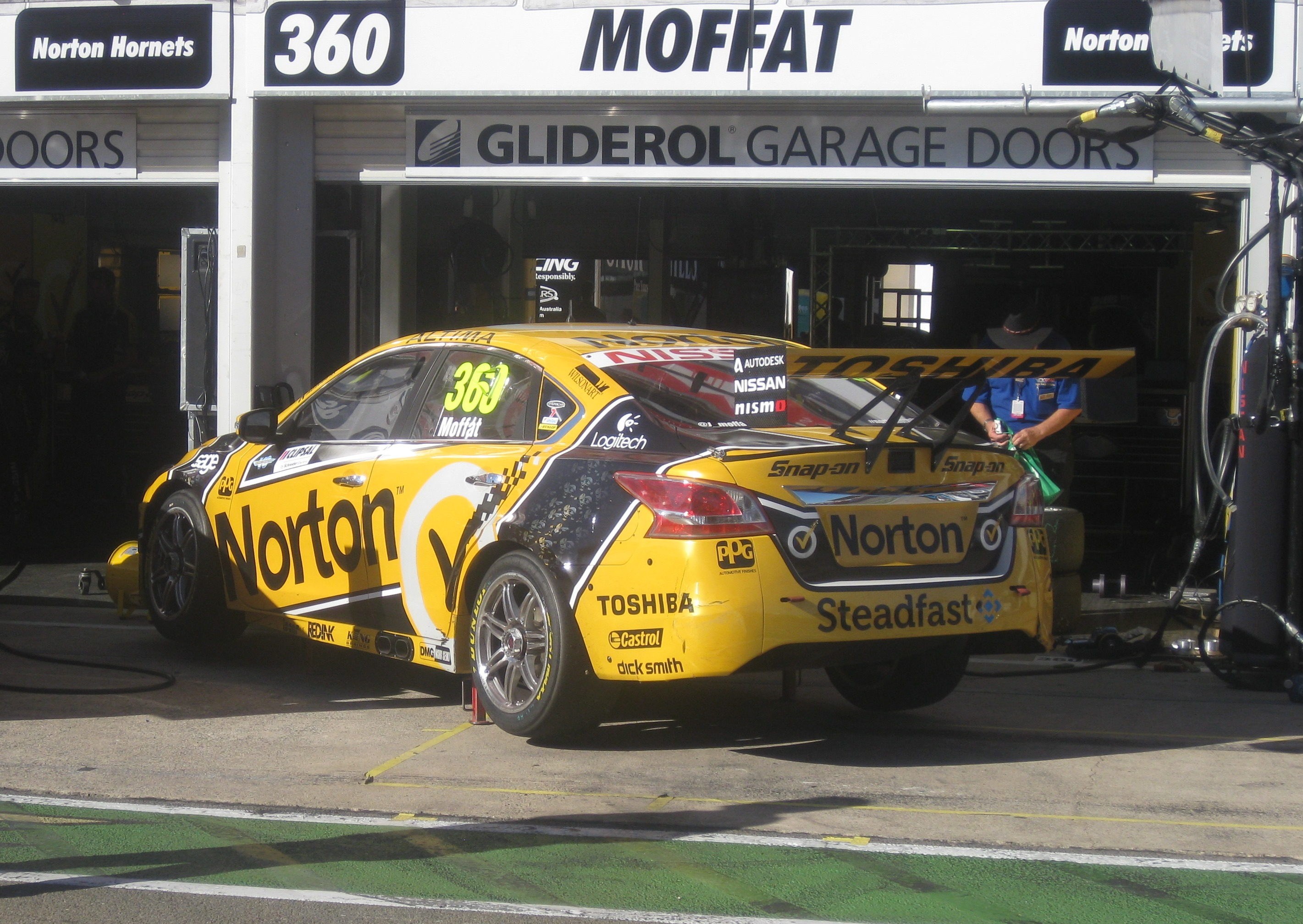
Moffat placed 16th in the 2014 V8 Supercars Championship driving a Nissan L33 Altima.

Sporting positions
Preceded by Nathan Herne	Winner of the Australian National Trans-Am Series; 2023	Succeeded by Todd Hazelwood
Awards and achievements
Preceded by Karl Reindler	Mike Kable Young Gun Award; 2009	Succeeded by Tim Blanchard
