= 2017 Perth SuperSprint =

2017 V8 Supercar championship race

(Western Australia) 2017 Perth SuperSprint
Event Information
- Round 4 of 14 in the 2017 International V8 Supercars Championship
- Date: 6–7 May 2017
- Location: Wanneroo, Western Australia
- Venue: Barbagallo Raceway

Results
Race 1
| Distance | 50 laps | 120 km |
| Pole position | (New Zealand) Fabian Coulthard; DJR Team Penske | 0:54.6667 |
| Winner | (New Zealand) Scott McLaughlin; DJR Team Penske | 48:58.8955 |
Race 2
| Distance | 83 laps | 200 km |
| Pole position | (New Zealand) Scott McLaughlin; DJR Team Penske | 0:54.5730 |
| Winner | (New Zealand) Scott McLaughlin; DJR Team Penske | 1:22:17.6422 |

The 2017 Perth SuperSprint was a motor racing event for the Supercars Championship, held on the weekend of 6 to 7 May 2017. The event was held at Barbagallo Raceway near Wanneroo, Western Australia and consisted of two races, 120 and 200 kilometres in length. It is the 4th event of fourteen in the 2017 Supercars Championship and hosted Races 7 and 8 of the season.

== Background ==
=== Driver changes ===
Taz Douglas was replaced at Lucas Dumbrell Motorsport with Matthew Brabham, becoming the first member of the Brabham family to compete in the Australian Touring Car Championship since his uncle David Brabham raced in the 2013 Gold Coast 600. Having been born in Florida, he became the first United States-born driver to participate in Supercars since Graham Rahal, Boris Said, and Marco Andretti participated as international drivers at the 2012 Gold Coast 600.

The Perth SuperSprint was the first of four events in the 2017 season that Super2 Series wildcards could compete in the main series, however no Super2 team was entered.
