= 2010 Fujitsu V8 Supercar Series =

Motor racing competition

The 2010 Fujitsu V8 Supercars Series was an Australian motor racing competition for V8 Supercars. It was the eleventh running of the V8 Supercar Development series. The series supported the 2010 V8 Supercar Championship Series, beginning on 11 March at the Clipsal 500 and ending on 5 December at the Sydney 500 after seven rounds.

Steve Owen won the series with a race in hand with victory in the first race at the 2010 Sydney Telstra 500. Owen, driving a Holden VE Commodore for Greg Murphy Racing placed in the top three in six of the seven rounds held, including round wins at the Adelaide, Queensland, Sandown and Sydney rounds, achieving eight race wins in total. It was the first time a Greg Murphy Racing driver had won the series.

Second place was attained by Tim Blanchard, driving a Ford BF Falcon for Sonic Motor Racing Services. He held onto a gap of 47 points over James Moffat. Walkinshaw Performance driver Nick Percat finished fourth, 27 behind Moffat and 9 ahead of MW Motorsport driver David Russell, who fell from third in the series with poor finishes in Sydney.

David Russell took victory at the Bathurst 1000 support round with two race victories, as well as scoring addition race wins at Winton and Sandown. Tim Blanchard, won the Townsville round, also winning his first Fujitsu Series race. Other race wins were mostly claimed by guest drivers making brief appearances in the series ahead of endurance co-driving roles in the Phillip Island 500K and Bathurst 1000 races, with wins being taken by Cameron McConville (2), Paul Morris and Jack Perkins. Taz Douglas took the remaining race win, the reverse grid race at Sandown.

== Calendar ==
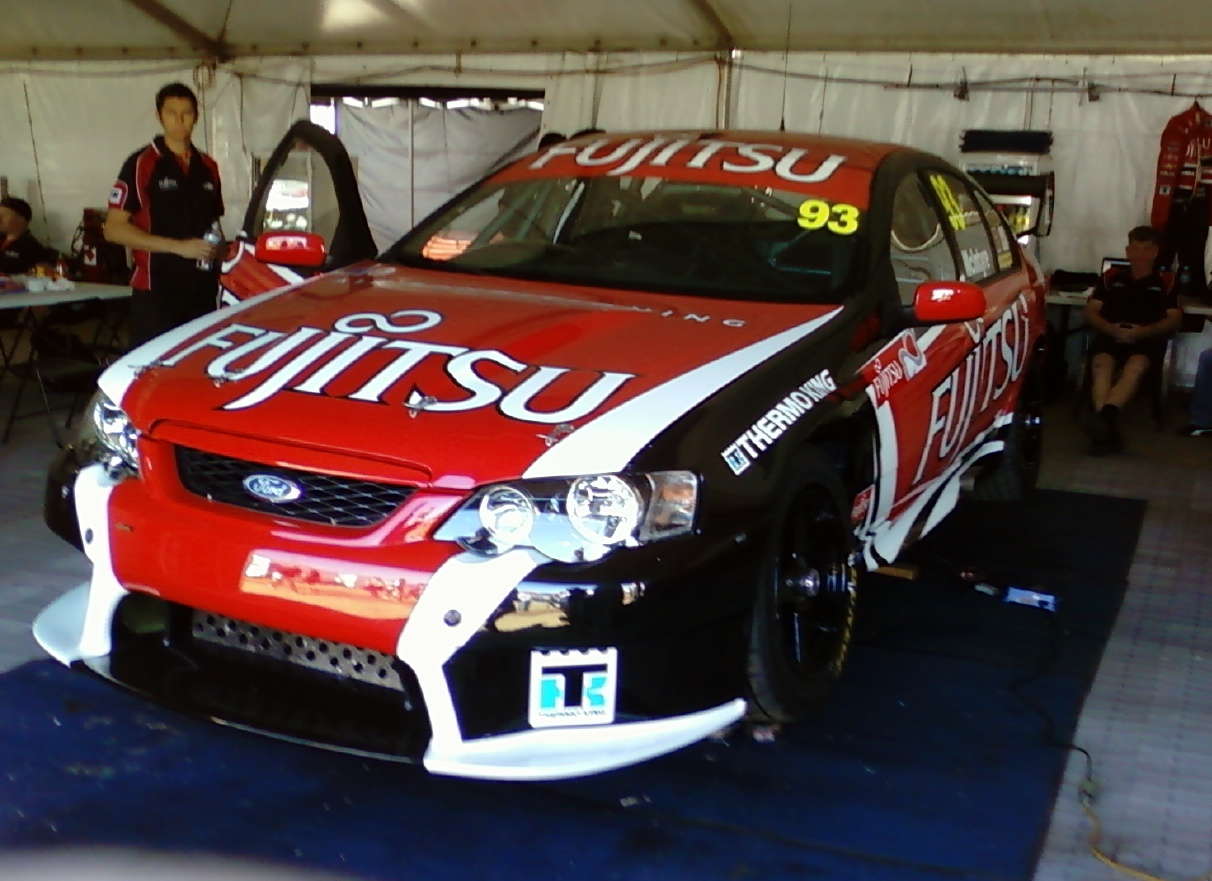
The Ford BF Falcon of John McIntyre at the Adelaide Parklands Circuit for the opening round of the 2010 Fujitsu V8 Supercar Series.

The 2010 Fujitsu V8 Supercar Series consisted of seven rounds:

Rd.	Event	Circuit	Location	Date	Winner
1	(South Australia) Clipsal 500	Adelaide Street Circuit	Adelaide, South Australia	11–14 March	Steve Owen
2	(Queensland) City of Ipswich 300	Queensland Raceway	Ipswich, Queensland	30 April-2 May	Steve Owen
3	(Victoria (state)) Winton	Winton Motor Raceway	Benalla, Victoria	14–16 May	Cameron McConville
4	(Queensland) Sucrogen Townsville 400	Townsville Street Circuit	Townsville, Queensland	9–11 July	Tim Blanchard
5	(New South Wales) Supercheap Auto Bathurst 1000	Mount Panorama Circuit	Bathurst, New South Wales	7–10 October	David Russell
6	(Victoria (state)) Norton 360 Sandown Challenge	Sandown Raceway	Melbourne, Victoria	19–21 November	Steve Owen
7	(New South Wales) Sydney Telstra 500	Homebush Street Circuit	Sydney, New South Wales	3–5 December	Steve Owen

== Teams and drivers ==
The following teams and drivers competed in the 2010 Fujitsu V8 Supercar Series.

Team	Vehicle	No	Driver	Rounds
Sieders Racing Team	Ford BF Falcon	13	(Australia) Colin Sieders	4–7
MW Motorsport	Ford BF Falcon	021	(New Zealand) Matthew Hamilton	1–3
MW Motorsport	Ford BF Falcon	021	(Australia) Marcus Marshall	4
MW Motorsport	Ford BF Falcon	26	(New Zealand) Ant Pedersen	1–3
MW Motorsport	Ford BF Falcon	26	(Australia) Luke Youlden	4
MW Motorsport	Ford BF Falcon	26	(United Kingdom) Ben Barker	5
MW Motorsport	Ford BF Falcon	26	(Australia) Matthew White	6
MW Motorsport	Ford BF Falcon	26	(Australia) Tom Tweedie	7
MW Motorsport	Ford BF Falcon	27	(Australia) Tony Bates	7
MW Motorsport	Ford BF Falcon	28	(Australia) David Russell	All
Triple F Racing	Holden VE Commodore	32	(Australia) Paul Fiore	1,3
Triple F Racing	Ford BF Falcon	32	(Australia) Paul Fiore	5, 7
Triple F Racing	Holden VE Commodore	32	(Australia) Todd Fiore	2, 4
Triple F Racing	Ford BF Falcon	32	(Australia) Todd Fiore	6
Eggleston Motorsport; Walkinshaw Racing	Holden VE Commodore	38	(Australia) Cameron McConville	3
Eggleston Motorsport; Walkinshaw Racing	Holden VE Commodore	38	(New Zealand) Craig Baird	4
Eggleston Motorsport; Walkinshaw Racing	Holden VE Commodore	38	(Australia) Ben Eggleston	5
Eggleston Motorsport; Walkinshaw Racing	Holden VE Commodore	54	(Australia) David Reynolds	4
Eggleston Motorsport; Walkinshaw Racing	Holden VE Commodore	222	(Australia) Nick Percat	5–7
Red Lion Racing Team	Holden VZ Commodore	40	(Australia) John Boston	7
Red Lion Racing Team	Holden VZ Commodore	41	(Australia) Bruce Oaklands	7
Jay Motorsport	Holden VZ Commodore	43	(Australia) Rod Salmon	5
Jay Motorsport	Holden VZ Commodore	43	(Australia) Shane Price	7
Jay Motorsport	Holden VZ Commodore	222	(Australia) Nick Percat	1–4
Greg Murphy Racing	Holden VE Commodore	45	(Australia) Steve Owen	All
Greg Murphy Racing	Holden VE Commodore	46	(New Zealand) Daniel Jilesen	3, 5–7
Greg Murphy Racing	Holden VE Commodore	46	(Australia) Geoff Emery	4
Greg Murphy Racing	Holden VZ Commodore	48	(Australia) Geoff Emery	1–3, 5–7
Greg Murphy Racing	Holden VZ Commodore	48	(Australia) Tony Bates	4
Ben McCashney Racing	Holden VZ Commodore	57	(Australia) Ben McCashney	3–4
Novocastrian Motorsport	Ford BF Falcon	58	(Australia) Drew Russell	All
Novocastrian Motorsport	Ford BF Falcon	59	(Australia) Aaren Russell	All
Warrin Mining	Holden VZ Commodore	62	(Australia) Adam Wallis	1, 5
Paul Morris Motorsport	Holden VZ Commodore	66	(Australia) Phill Foster	1–5
Paul Morris Motorsport	Holden VZ Commodore	66	(Australia) Paul Morris	1^{1}, 7
Paul Morris Motorsport	Holden VZ Commodore	66	(Australia) Amber Anderson	6
Paul Morris Motorsport	Holden VE Commodore	67	(Australia) Paul Morris	2, 4–5
Paul Morris Motorsport	Holden VE Commodore	67	(Australia) Jack Perkins	3, 6
Paul Morris Motorsport	Holden VE Commodore	78	(Australia) Jack Perkins	2
Action Racing	Holden VZ Commodore	71	(Australia) Marcus Zukanovic	All
McGill Motorsport	Ford BF Falcon	75	(Australia) Aaron McGill	1, 3–7
Kelly Racing	Holden VE Commodore	77	(Australia) Owen Kelly	2–3
Miles Racing	Ford BF Falcon	86	(Australia) Wayne Miles	2–4
Miles Racing	Ford BF Falcon	86	(Australia) Chaz Mostert	5
Fastaz Motorsport	Holden VZ Commodore	92	(Australia) Taz Douglas	4, 6–7
Stone Brothers Racing	Ford BF Falcon	93	(New Zealand) John McIntyre	1
Stone Brothers Racing	Ford BF Falcon	93	(New Zealand) Scott McLaughlin	2–7
Batavia Coast Motorsport	Ford BF Falcon	95	(Australia) Nathan Vince	All
Peters Motorsport	Ford BF Falcon	96	(Australia) Ryan Hansford	1–6
Peters Motorsport	Ford BF Falcon	96	(Australia) David Besnard	7
Ford Rising Stars Racing	Ford BF Falcon	99	(Australia) James Moffat	All
Sonic Motor Racing Services	Ford BF Falcon	777	(Australia) Rodney Jane	All
Sonic Motor Racing Services	Ford BF Falcon	999	(Australia) Tim Blanchard	All

^1 – Paul Morris was a last minute entry in Round 1 in the #66 car after the regular driver Phill Foster failed to qualify.

== Points system ==
Points were awarded only to drivers who completed 75% of race distance and were running on the completion of the final lap. Points were awarded on the following basis.

Pos	1st	2nd	3rd	4th	5th	6th	7th	8th	9th	10th	11th	12th	13th	14th	15th	16th	17th	18th	19th	20th	21st
Rounds 1, 5 & 7 Both races	150	138	129	120	111	102	96	90	84	78	72	69	66	63	60	57	54	51	48	45	42
Rounds 2–4 & 6 Races 1 & 3	120	110	103	96	89	82	77	72	67	62	57	55	53	51	48	46	43	41	38	36	33
Rounds 2–4 & 6 Race 2	60	56	52	48	44	40	38	36	34	32	30	28	26	24	23	22	21	20	19	18	17

== Driver standings ==
Pos	Driver	ADE		QLD			WIN			TOW			BAT		SAN			SYD		Pts
1	Steve Owen	1	1	2	1	2	2	4	2	1	1	15	2	17	1	5	3	1	1	1835
2	Tim Blanchard	5	5	5	10	4	4	6	17	6	3	1	14	5	5	2	5	4	4	1520
3	James Moffat	2	2	15	9	Ret	3	5	Ret	2	Ret	7	4	2	3	3	2	3	3	1473
4	Nick Percat	4	10	8	4	7	6	3	3	10	2	3	5	3	Ret	Ret	7	2	2	1446
5	David Russell	14	3	3	8	Ret	5	1	19	3	4	4	1	1	4	8	1	18	12	1437
6	Rodney Jane	7	11	6	5	10	7	9	6	20	19	11	7	8	8	6	12	9	16	1161
7	Geoff Emery	8	7	12	14	8	Ret	10	12	Ret	Ret	10	8	6	7	8	9	11	7	1002
8	Marcus Zukanovic	9	8	14	13	6	19	Ret	11	Ret	9	9	10	9	Ret	10	11	6	10	960
9	Aaren Russell	12	13	18	15	13	8	15	8	12	10	13	12	10	11	16	14	10	Ret	920
10	Drew Russell	Ret	6	11	6	9	Ret	14	7	8	16	6	Ret	11	9	9	19	Ret	5	850
11	Ryan Hansford	13	9	16	Ret	15	12	17	16	14	14	19	18	12	13	12	17			723
12	Scott McLaughlin			9	Ret	DNS	13	7	4	9	8	12	Ret	DNS	6	Ret	6	Ret	6	678
13	Jack Perkins			4	3	1	15	8	5						2	4	10			661
14	Nathan Vince	DNQ	DNQ	19	16	14	17	18	20	15	Ret	18	20	15	15	14	13	16	13	649
15	Aaron McGill	11	14				14	21	15	Ret	15	Ret	16	14	17	15	16	12	11	647
16	Paul Morris	Ret	Ret	1	7	3				4	Ret	DNS	3	Ret				5	Ret	597
17	Ant Pedersen	6	4	10	2	11	Ret	13	10											485
18	Daniel Jilesen						10	11	13				11	13	16	Ret	Ret	7	Ret	425
19	Taz Douglas									7	6	8			10	1	4	Ret	DNS	407
20	Matthew Hamilton	Ret	12	13	11	12	11	12	14											343
21	Todd Fiore			17	12	Ret				18	11	16			12	13	15			317
22	Cameron McConville						1	2	1											296
23	Ben McCashney						9	16	9	11	12	14								292
24	Phill Foster	DNQ	DNQ	20	DNS	DNS	16	19	18	16	Ret	DNS	19	18						287
25	Wayne Miles			21	17	Ret	18	20	19	17	20	20								248
26	Paul Fiore	10	Ret				Ret	DNS	DNS				13	Ret				19	17	246
27	Chaz Mostert												6	4						222
28	Colin Sieders									19	13	Ret						14	15	187
29	Tony Bates									13	17	17						17	Ret	171
30	David Besnard																	11	8	162
31	Ben Barker												15	7						156
32	Owen Kelly			7	Ret	5	DNS	DNS	DNS											151
33	David Reynolds									Ret	7	2								148
34	Matthew White														14	11	8			138
35	Craig Baird									5	5	DNS								133
36	John McIntyre	3	Ret																	129
37	John Boston																	13	14	129
38	Tom Tweedie																	15	18	111
39	Adam Wallis	Ret	DNS										17	16						111
40	Luke Youlden									Ret	18	5								109
41	Amber Anderson														18	17	18			103
42	Ben Eggleston												9	Ret						84
42	Shane Price																	Ret	9	84
	Marcus Marshall									Ret	Ret	DNS								0
	Rod Salmon												DNQ	DNQ						0
	Bruce Oaklands																	DNQ	DNQ	0

Colour	Result
Gold	Winner
Silver	Second place
Bronze	Third place
Green	Points classification
Blue	Non-points classification
Blue	Non-classified finish (NC)
Purple	Retired, not classified (Ret)
Red	Did not qualify (DNQ)
Red	Did not pre-qualify (DNPQ)
Black	Disqualified (DSQ)
White	Did not start (DNS)
White	Withdrew (WD)
White	Race cancelled (C)
Blank	Did not practice (DNP)
Blank	Did not arrive (DNA)
Blank	Excluded (EX)

== See also ==
- 2010 V8 Supercar season
