= Ben McCashney =

Australian racing driver (born 1988)

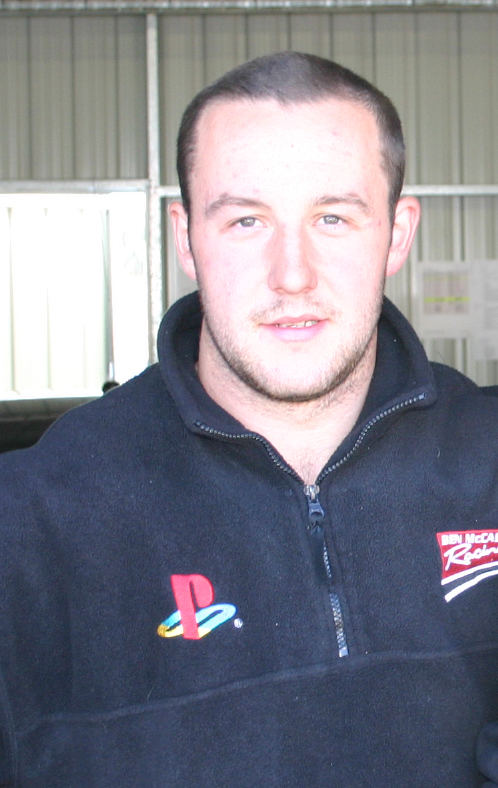
- Nationality: Australian
- Born: Benjamin Thomas McCashney; 26 October 1988 (age 38) Trentham, Victoria, Australia

Fujitsu V8 Supercar Series
- Years active: 2009–10
- Teams: Ben McCashney Racing; Image Racing
- Starts: 7
- Best finish: 15th in 2009 Fujitsu V8 Supercar Series

Previous series
- 2005 2006–08: Victorian Improved Production; Aussie Racing Cars

Benjamin Thomas McCashney (born 26 October 1988 in Trentham, Victoria) is an Australian racing driver.

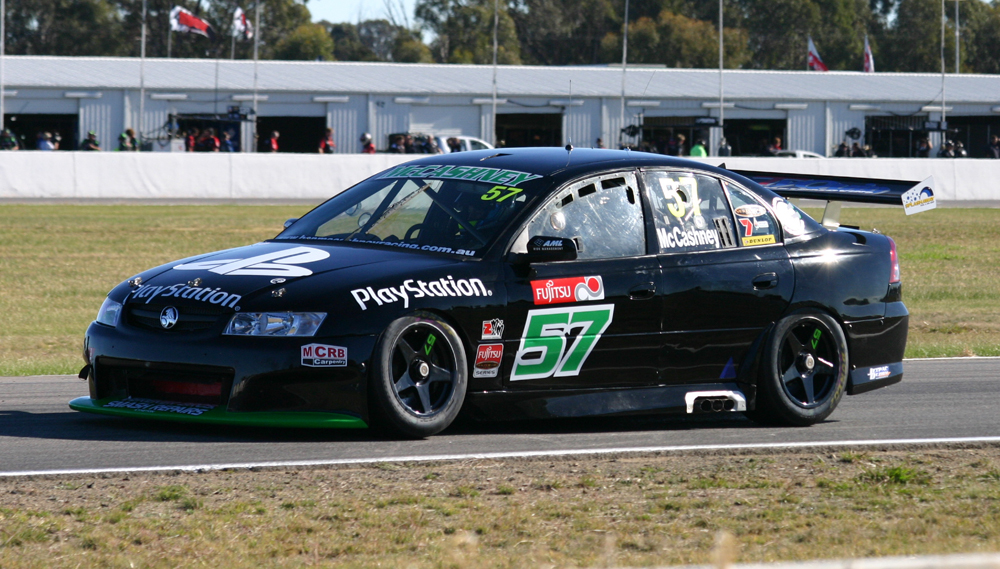
Ben McCashney at Winton, 2010

McCashney's career started at the early age of three, racing at his father's go-kart centre. Ten state championships came with his karting career. McCashney went on to race a Mitsubishi Mirage in Improved Production in 2005.

In 2006, McCashney moved into the Aussie Racing Cars series, finishing runner up in 2007 before moving to the V8 Supercar development series in 2009, driving an Image Racing BA Falcon. In 2010 McCashney competed for his own team, Ben McCashney Racing, driving a Paul Morris prepared VZ Commodore.

== Ben McCashney Racing ==
Ben McCashney Racing is the team name that McCashney has raced under during most of his career. The team is based in Kyneton, Victoria.

== Career results ==
Season	Title	Position	Car	Team
2005	Victorian Improved Production	4th	Mitsubishi Mirage	Ben McCashney Racing
2006	Aussie Racing Cars	10th	AU Falcon-Yamaha	Ben McCashney Racing
2007	Aussie Racing Cars	2nd	AU Falcon-Yamaha	Ben McCashney Racing
2008	Aussie Racing Cars	4th	AU Falcon-Yamaha	Ben McCashney Racing
2009	Fujitsu V8 Supercars Series	15th	Ford BA Falcon	Image Racing
2010	Fujitsu V8 Supercars Series	23rd	Holden VZ Commodore	Ben McCashney Racing
