= 2009 Fujitsu V8 Supercar Series =

Motor racing competition

The 2009 Fujitsu V8 Supercars Series was the tenth running of the V8 Supercar Development series. It supported the 2009 V8 Supercar Championship Series, beginning on 19 March at the Clipsal 500 and ending on 6 December at the Sydney 500 after seven rounds.

With one race to spare, Jonathon Webb secured the series, in doing so becoming the first driver from MW Motorsport to win the title after having competed in the very first series for second-tier V8 Supercars. James Moffat took second place from David Russell at the final race of the series. Ford drivers filled the top seven places with Grant Denyer, Daniel Gaunt, Brad Lowe and Damian Assaillit filling those positions. The first Holden driver was Sam Walter, over 900 points behind Webb.

Webb did not win a race until the fifth round of the series at Queensland Raceway, but from there won every race bar one, where he was second, an irresistible charge for the series that neither Moffat nor Russell had any answer to after the three drivers had been close for the first half of the series.

== Calendar ==
The 2009 Fujitsu V8 Supercar Series on consisted of seven rounds:

Rd.	Event	Circuit	Location	Date	Winner
1	(Australia) Clipsal 500	Adelaide Street Circuit	Adelaide, South Australia	19–22 Mar	David Russell
2	(Australia) Winton	Winton Motor Raceway	Benalla, Victoria	1–3 May	Jonathon Webb
3	(Australia) Dunlop Townsville 400	Townsville Street Circuit	Townsville, Queensland	10–12 Jul	James Moffat
4	(Australia) Norton 360 Sandown Challenge	Sandown Raceway	Melbourne, Victoria	31 Jul – 2 Aug	David Russell
5	(Australia) Queensland House & Land 300	Queensland Raceway	Ipswich, Queensland	21–23 Aug	Jonathon Webb
6	(Australia) Supercheap Auto Bathurst 1000	Mount Panorama Circuit	Bathurst, New South Wales	8–11 Oct	Jonathon Webb
7	(Australia) Sydney Telstra 500	Homebush Street Circuit	Sydney, New South Wales	4–6 Dec	Jonathon Webb

== Teams and drivers ==
The following teams and drivers have competed during the 2009 Fujitsu V8 Supercar Series.

Team	Vehicle	No	Driver	Rounds
Sieders Racing Team	Ford BF Falcon	19	(Australia) David Sieders	1–2, 4
Sieders Racing Team	Ford BF Falcon	19	(Australia) Colin Sieders	5–6
Sieders Racing Team	Ford BF Falcon	19	(Australia) Hayden Pullen	7
Sieders Racing Team	Ford BF Falcon	49	(Australia) David Sieders	7
Sonic Motor Racing Services	Ford BF Falcon	20	(Australia) Bryce Washington	1–2
Sonic Motor Racing Services	Ford BF Falcon	20	(Australia) Rodney Jane	3–7
Sonic Motor Racing Services	Ford BF Falcon	999	(Australia) James Moffat	All
MW Motorsport	Ford BF Falcon	26	(Australia) Jonathon Webb	All
MW Motorsport	Ford BF Falcon	28	(Australia) Brad Lowe	All
MW Motorsport	Ford BA Falcon	29	(Australia) Damian Assaillit	All
Howard Racing	Ford BF Falcon	27	(Australia) David Russell	All
Howard Racing	Ford BA Falcon	35	(Australia) Mark Howard	5
TAG Motorsport	Holden VZ Commodore	35	(Australia) Tony Bates	2, 4, 6
TAG Motorsport	Holden VZ Commodore	36	(Australia) Geoff Emery	All
Eggleston Motorsport	Holden VZ Commodore	38	(Australia) Ben Eggleston	1-2
Eggleston Motorsport	Holden VE Commodore	38	(Australia) Ben Eggleston	6-7
Jay Motorsport	Holden VZ Commodore	42	(Australia) Shane Price	1–5
Jay Motorsport	Holden VZ Commodore	42	(Australia) Jay Verdnik	6
Jay Motorsport	Holden VZ Commodore	42	(United Kingdom) James Winslow	7
Jay Motorsport	Holden VZ Commodore	43	(Australia) Chris Alajajian	1
Jay Motorsport	Holden VZ Commodore	43	(Australia) Garth Walden	7
McGill Motorsport	Ford BA Falcon	43	(Australia) Aaron McGill	6
Greg Murphy Racing	Holden VZ Commodore	47	(Australia) Sam Walter	1–5, 7
Greg Murphy Racing	Holden VZ Commodore	47	(New Zealand) Andrew Anderson	6
Image Racing	Ford BA Falcon	49	(Australia) Ben McCashney	2–6
McElrea Racing	Ford BF Falcon	50	(New Zealand) Daniel Gaunt	1–6
McElrea Racing	Ford BF Falcon	444	(Australia) Karl Reindler	4–5
Novocastrian Motorsport	Ford BF Falcon	53	(Australia) Drew Russell	6–7
Race Image Motorsport	Ford BF Falcon	60	(Australia) Drew Russell	1–2
Race Image Motorsport	Ford BF Falcon	60	(New Zealand) Gene Rollinson	5–6
Race Image Motorsport	Ford BF Falcon	60	(Australia) Marcus Marshall	7
Paul Morris Motorsport	Holden VZ Commodore	72	(New Zealand) Colin Corkery	1
Paul Morris Motorsport	Holden VE Commodore	72	(New Zealand) Colin Corkery	5, 7
Paul Morris Motorsport	Holden VE Commodore	72	(Australia) Paul Morris	3
West Coast Racing	Holden VZ Commodore	74	(Australia) Mark McNally	1–2
Fastaz Motorsport	Holden VZ Commodore	92	(Australia) Taz Douglas	All
Sydney Star Racing	Ford BA Falcon	96	(Australia) Brett Hobson	1
Sydney Star Racing	Ford BA Falcon	96	(Australia) Todd Wanless	3
Sydney Star Racing	Ford BA Falcon	96	(Australia) Ryan Hansford	7
Sydney Star Racing	Ford BA Falcon	98	(Australia) Aaron McGill	7
TanderSport	Ford BF Falcon	222	(Australia) Leanne Tander	2, 4–5
Dick Johnson Racing	Ford BF Falcon	777	(Australia) Grant Denyer	All

== Points system ==
Points are awarded to any driver that completes 75% of race distance and is running on the completion of the final lap. These are the points awarded for each race.

Pos	1st	2nd	3rd	4th	5th	6th	7th	8th	9th	10th	11th	12th	13th	14th	15th	16th	17th	18th	19th
Rounds 1, 6 & 7	150	138	129	120	111	102	96	90	84	78	72	69	66	63	60	57	54	51	48
Rounds 2 – 5	100	92	86	80	74	68	64	60	56	52	48	46	44	42	40	38	36	34	32

== Driver standings ==
Pos	Driver	ADE		WIN			TOW			SAN			QLD			BAT		SYD		Pts
1	Jonathon Webb	4	2	4	3	3	2	2	4	4	12	3	1	1	1	1	1	2	1	1874
2	James Moffat	1	3	Ret	8	7	1	3	1	1	Ret	2	3	8	3	9	2	1	2	1623
3	David Russell	2	1	9	1	2	3	12	3	9	1	1	2	7	2	2	5	Ret	5	1618
4	Grant Denyer	11	7	5	6	1	7	1	6	10	2	4	7	5	6	5	Ret	3	3	1431
5	Daniel Gaunt	7	4	17	12	Ret	4	9	2	5	4	7	5	10	8	3	4			1179
6	Brad Lowe	Ret	8	3	9	4	5	10	Ret	3	13	9	6	3	5	7	3	Ret	Ret	1077
7	Damian Assaillit	8	Ret	1	17	5	9	Ret	10	6	5	5	12	Ret	11	4	6	Ret	10	1018
8	Sam Walter	3	11	2	13	17	14	5	Ret	11	15	6	10	2	4			Ret	11	943
9	Taz Douglas	9	6	6	14	11	6	8	5	8	Ret	11	16	13	12	DNS	15	Ret	9	926
10	Geoff Emery	10	12	16	10	8	11	Ret	7	Ret	6	10	13	9	19	16	Ret	6	6	922
11	Shane Price	6	5	8	2	9	8	4	Ret	2	Ret	8	4	6	10					913
12	Rodney Jane						12	7	8	13	9	12	9	16	9	15	11	8	12	757
13	Drew Russell	5	Ret	7	5	12										17	10	7	7	619
14	David Sieders	12	DNS	11	15	14				7	3	13						5	8	594
15	Ben McCashney			13	Ret	15	13	6	Ret	14	7	Ret	14	12	17	12	Ret			495
16	Ben Eggleston	13	10	Ret	11	13										11	7	Ret	13	470
17	Tony Bates			12	16	18				Ret	11	14				13	13			340
18	Gene Rollinson												15	11	14	8	8			310
19	Karl Reindler									12	10	Ret	8	4	7					302
20	Leanne Tander			15	18	16				Ret	8	Ret	11	14	15					302
21	Colin Corkery	DNS	9										19	18	13			10	14	257
22	Marcus Marshall																	4	4	240
23	Colin Sieders												16	17	18	14	14			234
24	Bryce Washington	Ret	DNS	10	4	6														200
25	Jay Verdnik															6	7			186
26	Mark McNally	Ret	DNS	14	7	10														158
27	Andrew Anderson															10	12			147
28	Todd Wanless						15	11	9											144
29	Ryan Hansford																	13	15	126
30	Garth Walden																	11	18	123
31	Hayden Pullen																	12	17	123
32	Mark Howard												18	15	16					112
33	James Winslow																	9	Ret	84
34	Aaron McGill															DNS	DNS	Ret	16	57
35	Paul Morris						10	Ret	Ret											52
	Brett Hobson	Ret	Ret																	
	Chris Alajajian	Ret	DNS																	

Colour	Result
Gold	Winner
Silver	Second place
Bronze	Third place
Green	Points classification
Blue	Non-points classification
Blue	Non-classified finish (NC)
Purple	Retired, not classified (Ret)
Red	Did not qualify (DNQ)
Red	Did not pre-qualify (DNPQ)
Black	Disqualified (DSQ)
White	Did not start (DNS)
White	Withdrew (WD)
White	Race cancelled (C)
Blank	Did not practice (DNP)
Blank	Did not arrive (DNA)
Blank	Excluded (EX)

== See also ==
- 2009 V8 Supercar season
