= Taz Douglas =

Australian racing driver

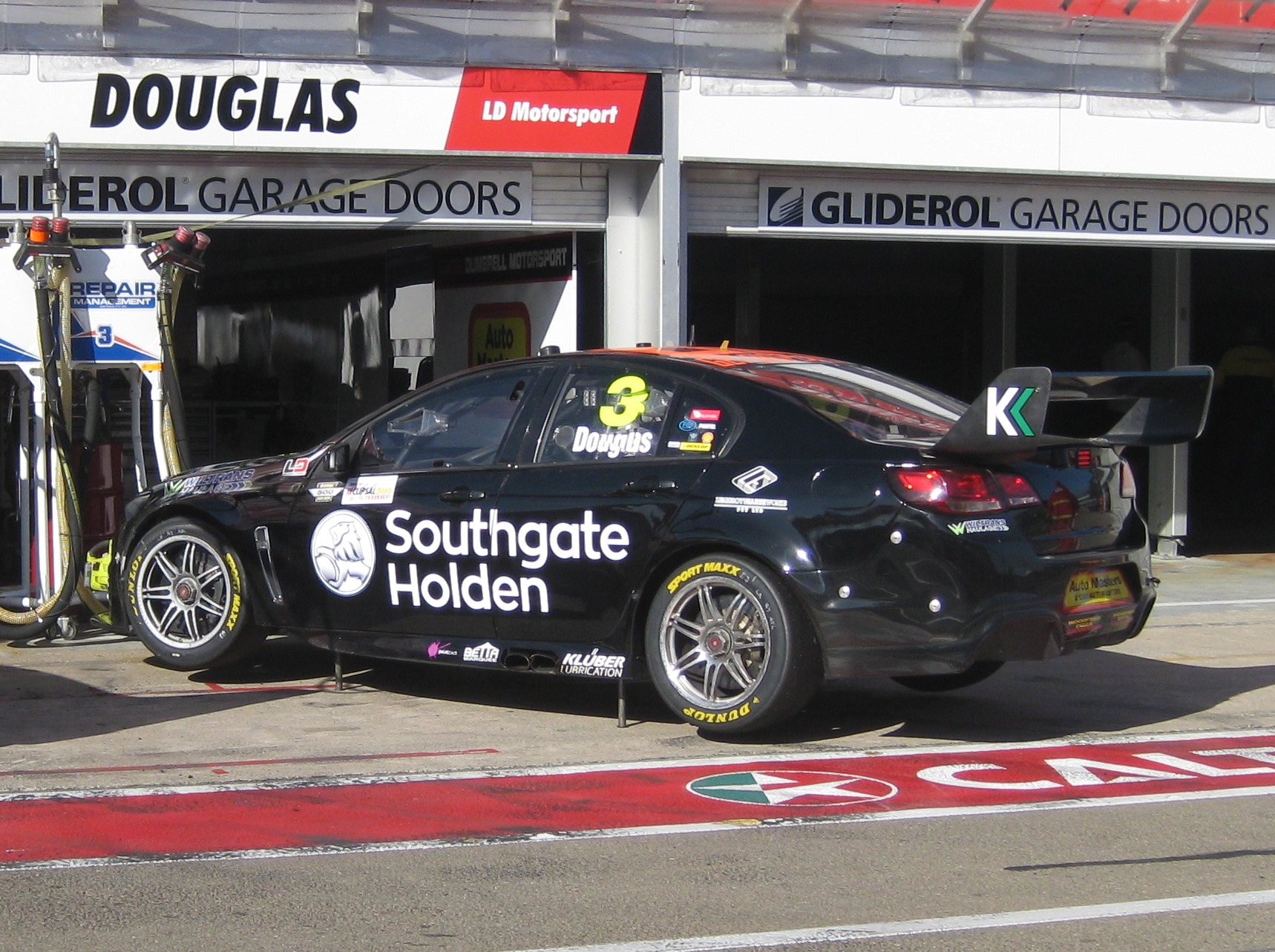
- Nationality: Australian
- Born: 11 February 1984 (age 42) Frankston, Victoria
- Categorisation: FIA Silver

Supercars Championship career
- Championships: 0
- Races: 60
- Wins: 0
- Podiums: 1
- Pole positions: 0
- 2017 position: 44th (348 pts)

Taz Douglas (born 11 February 1984) is a part-time Australian race driver. Douglas came second at the Supercheap Auto Bathurst 1000 with James Moffat in 2014.

== Biography ==
Douglas was born in Frankston, Victoria, Australia. Having scored numerous karting titles in his junior years - including the Ford Kart Stars Series in 2000.

Douglas returned to motorsport in 2005, making his Formula Ford debut in the Victorian Championship, finishing fourth.

In 2006, Douglas won the title and began working with the squad for HSV dealer team in V8 Supercars and testing their Commodore in the second half of the season.

In 2012, Douglas was called up to drive for Lucas Dumbrell Motorsport as their full-time driver.

In 2013, Douglas did not retain his full-time International V8 Supercars Championship seat at Lucas Dumbrell Motorsport. Douglas would return to the Dunlop Series where he had spent his time driving his own team prior to getting his main game call-up. Douglas would race with Image Racing in 2013 in the ex-Shane van Gisbergen, Stone Brothers Racing Ford FG Falcon. In 2013 Douglas will also make his fourth start in the V8 Supercars Endurance races, getting a call-up from Nissan Motosport to partner James Moffat in the Norton backed Nissan Altima.

== Career results ==
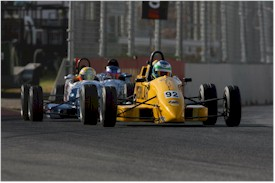
Douglas placed 8th in the 2007 Australian Formula Ford Championship driving a Mygale SJ06 Ford

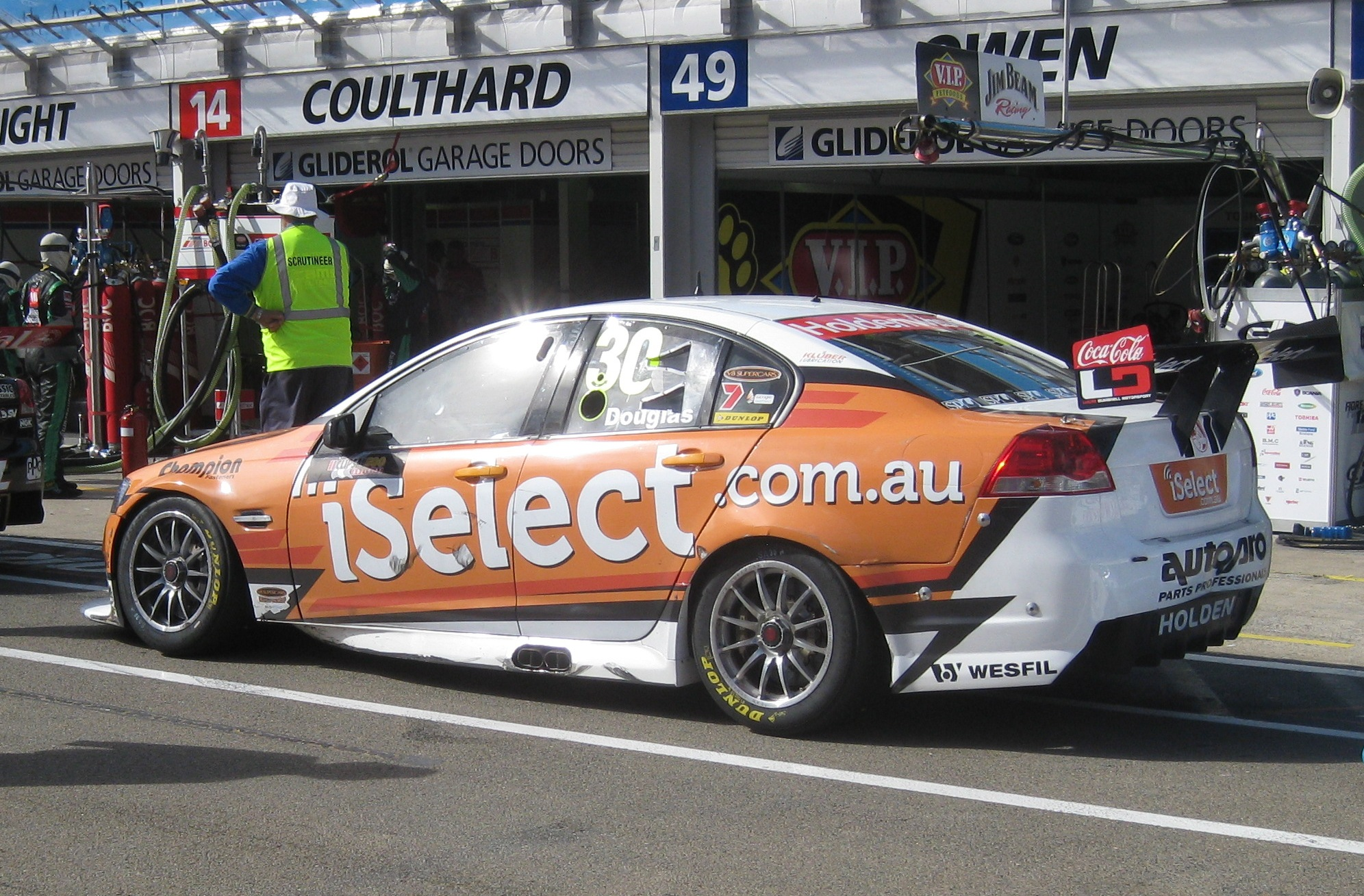
Douglas placed 26th in the 2012 V8 Supercars Championship driving a Holden VE Commodore

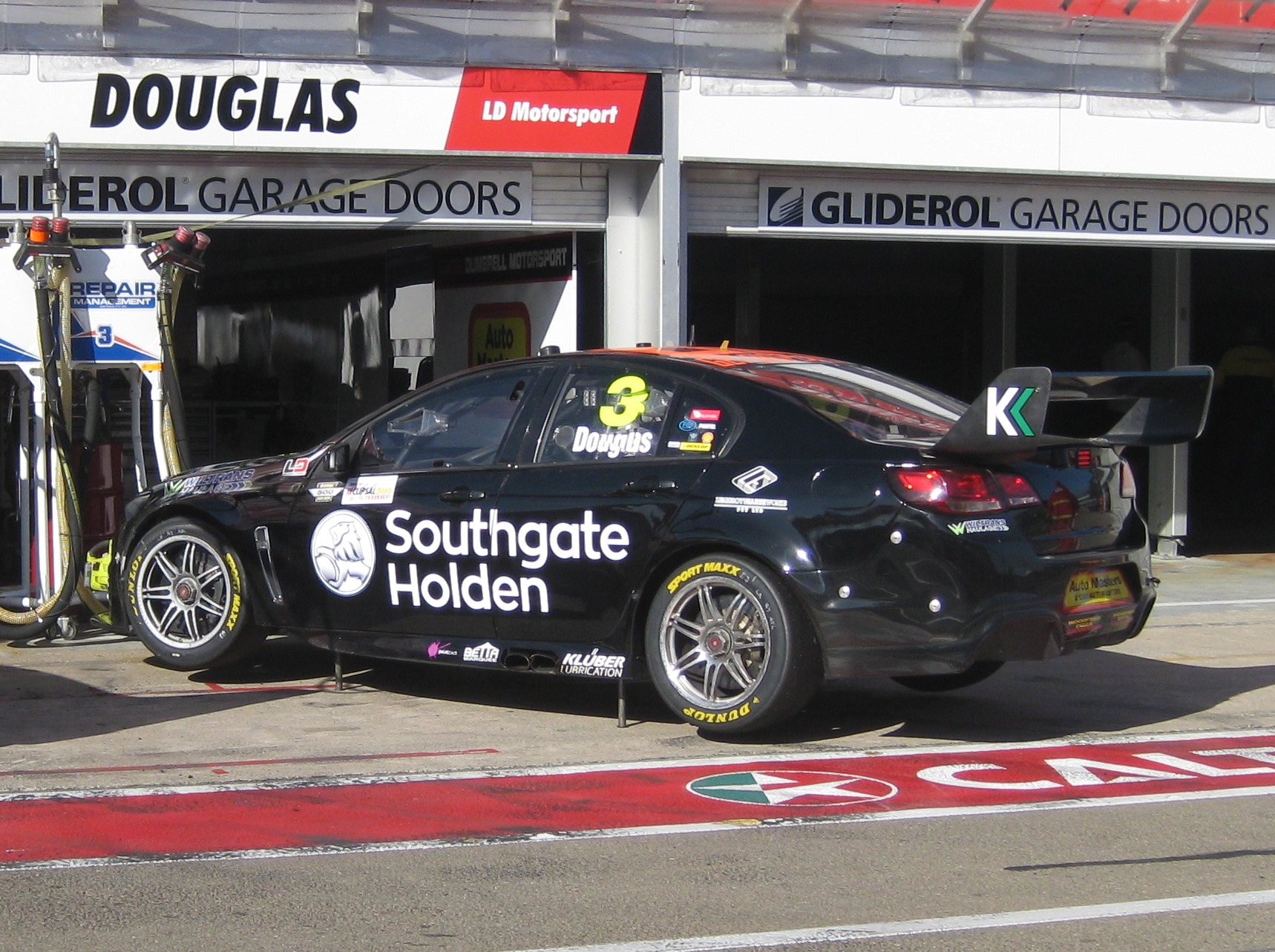
Douglas placed 44th in the 2017 Supercars Championship driving a Holden VF Commodore for Lucas Dumbrell Motorsport

Season	Series	Position	Car	Team
2000	Australian Ford Kart Stars	1st		Douglas Racing
2005	Victorian Formula Ford Championship	4th	Van Diemen RF 01 - Ford	Douglas Racing
2006	Australian Formula Ford Championship	17th	Van Diemen RF 05 - Ford	Minda Motorsport
2006	Victorian Formula Ford Championship	1st	Van Diemen RF 01 - Ford	Douglas Racing
2006	New South Wales Formula Ford Championship	17th	Van Diemen RF 01 - Ford	Minda Motorsport
2007	Australian Formula Ford Championship	8th	Mygale SJ06 - Ford	G-Force Motorsport
2007	Victorian Formula Ford Championship	20th	Van Diemen RF 01 - Ford	Douglas Racing
2008	Fujitsu V8 Supercar Series	32nd	Ford AU Falcon; Holden VZ Commodore	Image Racing; Eggleston Motorsport
2009	Fujitsu V8 Supercar Series	9th	Holden VZ Commodore	Fastaz Motorsport
2009	V8 Supercar Championship Series	62nd	Holden VE Commodore	Greg Murphy Racing
2010	Fujitsu V8 Supercar Series	19th	Holden VZ Commodore	Fastaz Motorsport
2010	V8 Supercar Championship Series	55th	Holden VE Commodore	Kelly Racing
2011	Fujitsu V8 Supercar Series	19th	Holden VZ Commodore	Fastaz Motorsport
2011	International V8 Supercars Championship	73rd	Ford FG Falcon	Tony D'Alberto Racing
2012	International V8 Supercars Championship	26th	Holden VE Commodore	Lucas Dumbrell Motorsport
2013	Dunlop V8 Supercar Series	6th	Ford FG Falcon	Image Racing
2013	International V8 Supercars Championship	55th	Nissan Altima	Nissan Motorsport
2014	Dunlop V8 Supercar Series	24th	Ford FG Falcon	Image Racing
2014	International V8 Supercars Championship	40th	Nissan Altima	Nissan Motorsport
2015	V8 Supercars Dunlop Series	21st	Holden VE Commodore	THR Developments
2015	International V8 Supercars Championship	39th	Nissan Altima	Nissan Motorsport
2016	Supercars Dunlop Series	5th	Holden VE Commodore	THR Developments; Eggleston Motorsport
2016	Australian V8 Touring Car Series	1st	Holden VE Commodore	SA Racing Logistics / THR Developments
2017	Australian Supercars Championship	44th	Holden VF Commodore	Lucas Dumbrell Motorsport

=== Supercars Championship results ===
Supercars results
Year	Team	Car	1	2	3	4	5	6	7	8	9	10	11	12	13	14	15	16	17	18	19	20	21	22	23	24	25	26	27	28	29	30	31	32	33	34	35	36	37	38	39	Pos.	Pts
2009	Greg Murphy Racing	Holden VE Commodore	ADE; R1	ADE; R2	HAM; R3	HAM; R4	WIN; R5	WIN; R6	SYM; R7	SYM; R8	HDV; R9	HDV; R10	TOW; R11	TOW; R12	SAN; R13	SAN; R14	QLD; R15	QLD; R16	PHI; Q 16	PHI; R17; 24	BAT; R18; Ret	SUR; R19	SUR; R20	SUR; R21	SUR; R22	PHI; R23	PHI; R24	BAR; R25	BAR; R26	SYD; R27	SYD; R28											63rd	70
2010	Kelly Racing	Holden VE Commodore	YMC; R1	YMC; R2	BHR; R3	BHR; R4	ADE; R5	ADE; R6	HAM; R7	HAM; R8	QLD; R9	QLD; R10	WIN; R11	WIN; R12	HDV; R13	HDV; R14	TOW; R15	TOW; R16	PHI; Q 13	PHI; R17; 25	BAT; R18; 22	SUR; R19	SUR; R20	SYM; R21	SYM; R22	SAN; R23	SAN; R24	SYD; R25	SYD; R26													55th	140
2011	Tony D'Alberto Racing	Ford FG Falcon	YMC; R1	YMC; R2	ADE; R3	ADE; R4	HAM; R5	HAM; R6	BAR; R7	BAR; R8	BAR; R9	WIN; R10	WIN; R11	HID; R12	HID; R13	TOW; R14	TOW; R15	QLD; R16	QLD; R17	QLD; R18	PHI; Q 26	PHI; R19; 21	BAT; R20	SUR; R21	SUR; R22	SYM; R23	SYM; R24	SAN; R25	SAN; R26	SYD; R27	SYD; R28											73rd	93
2012	Lucas Dumbrell Motorsport	Holden VE Commodore	ADE; R1; Ret	ADE; R2; 24	SYM; R3; 12	SYM; R4; 20	HAM; R5; 20	HAM; R6; 19	BAR; R7; 24	BAR; R8; 26	BAR; R9; 25	PHI; R10; 20	PHI; R11; 18	HID; R12; Ret	HID; R13; 16	TOW; R14; 23	TOW; R15; 17	QLD; R16; 23	QLD; R17; 22	SMP; R18; 21	SMP; R19; 24	SAN; Q 28	SAN; R20; 24	BAT; R21; Ret	SUR; R22; 14	SUR; R23; 16	YMC; R24; 26	YMC; R25; 24	YMC; R26; 22	WIN; R27; 23	WIN; R28; 24	SYD; R29; 18	SYD; R30; 13									26th	1079
2013	Nissan Motorsport	Nissan Altima L33	ADE; R1	ADE; R2	SYM; R3	SYM; R4	SYM; R5	PUK; R6	PUK; R7	PUK; R8	PUK; R9	BAR; R10	BAR; R11	BAR; R12	COA; R13	COA; R14	COA; R15	COA; R16	HID; R17	HID; R18	HID; R19	TOW; R20; PO	TOW; R21; PO	QLD; R22	QLD; R23	QLD; R24	WIN; R25	WIN; R26	WIN; R27	SAN; QR; 20	SAN; R28; 26	BAT; R29; 18	SUR; R30; Ret	SUR; R31; Ret	PHI; R32	PHI; R33	PHI; R34	SYD; R35	SYD; R36			57th	156
2014	Nissan Motorsport	Nissan Altima L33	ADE; R1	ADE; R2	ADE; R3	SYM; R4	SYM; R5	SYM; R6	WIN; R7	WIN; R8	WIN; R9	PUK; R10	PUK; R11	PUK; R12	PUK; R13	BAR; R14; PO	BAR; R15; PO	BAR; R16; PO	HID; R17	HID; R18	HID; R19	TOW; R20	TOW; R21	TOW; R22	QLD; R23	QLD; R24	QLD; R25	SMP; R26	SMP; R27	SMP; R28	SAN; QR; 23	SAN; R29; Ret	BAT; R30; 2	SUR; R31; 13	SUR; R32; Ret	PHI; R33	PHI; R34	PHI; R35	SYD; R36	SYD; R37	SYD; R38	40th	342
2015	Nissan Motorsport	Nissan Altima L33	ADE; R1	ADE; R2	ADE; R3	SYM; R4	SYM; R5	SYM; R6	BAR; R7; PO	BAR; R8; PO	BAR; R9; PO	WIN; R10; PO	WIN; R11; PO	WIN; R12; PO	HID; R13	HID; R14	HID; R15	TOW; R16; PO	TOW; R17; PO	QLD; R18; PO	QLD; R19	QLD; R20	SMP; R21	SMP; R22	SMP; R23	SAN; QR; 20	SAN; R24; 18	BAT; R25; 10	SUR; R26; 10	SUR; R27; 8	PUK; R28	PUK; R29	PUK; R30	PHI; R31	PHI; R32	PHI; R33	SYD; R34	SYD; R35	SYD; R36			39th	416
2017	Lucas Dumbrell Motorsport	Holden VF Commodore	ADE; R1; 24	ADE; R2; 24	SYM; R3; Ret	SYM; R4; DNS	PHI; R5; 20	PHI; R6; 24	BAR; R7	BAR; R8	WIN; R9; 24	WIN; R10; 27	HID; R11	HID; R12	TOW; R13	TOW; R14	QLD; R15	QLD; R16	SMP; R17	SMP; R18	SAN; QR; 26	SAN; R19; Ret	BAT; R20; 17	SUR; R21; Ret	SUR; R22; Ret	PUK; R23	PUK; R24	NEW; R25; Ret	NEW; R26; 21													44th	348

=== Complete Bathurst 1000 results ===
Year	Team	Car	Co-driver	Position	Laps
2009	Greg Murphy Racing	Holden Commodore VE	(Australia) Sam Walter	DNF	84
2010	Kelly Racing	Holden Commodore VE	(Australia) Tony Ricciardello	22nd	158
2012	Lucas Dumbrell Motorsport	Holden Commodore VE	(Australia) Scott Pye	DNF	97
2013	Nissan Motorsport	Nissan Altima L33	(Australia) James Moffat	18th	161
2014	Nissan Motorsport	Nissan Altima L33	(Australia) James Moffat	2nd	161
2015	Nissan Motorsport	Nissan Altima L33	(Australia) James Moffat	10th	161
2017	Lucas Dumbrell Motorsport	Holden Commodore VF	(Australia) Aaren Russell	17th	154
