= 2012 Armor All Gold Coast 600 =

Motor race

Coordinates: 27°59′23″S 153°25′40″E

(Queensland) 2012 Armor All Gold Coast 600
Event Information
- Round 12 of 15 in the 2012 International V8 Supercars Championship
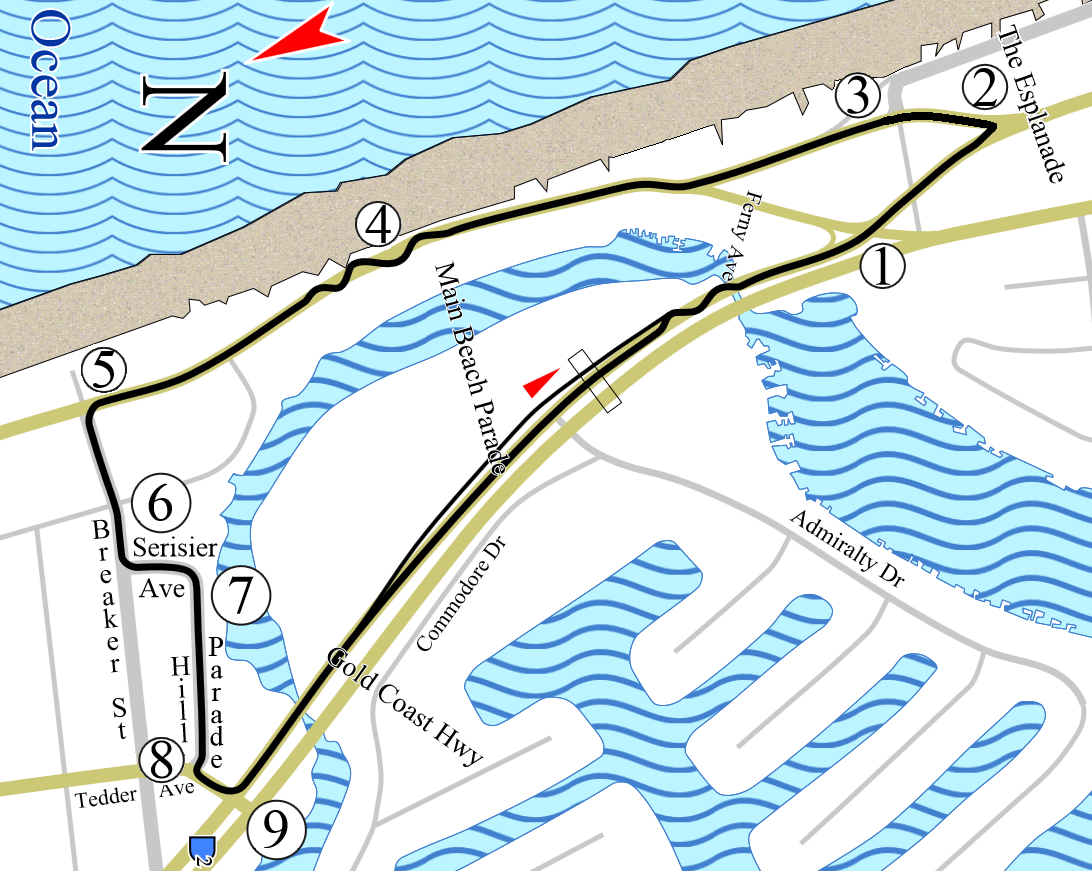
- Date: 19–21 October 2012
- Location: Surfers Paradise, Queensland
- Venue: Surfers Paradise Street Circuit
- Weather: Fine

Results
Race 1
Distance	79 laps	234 km
Pole position	Jamie Whincup; Triple Eight Race Engineering	1:11.6478
Winner	Jamie Whincup; Sébastien Bourdais; Triple Eight Race Engineering	1:45:10.0919
Race 2
Distance	102 laps	300 km
Pole position	Jamie Whincup; Triple Eight Race Engineering	1:11.1077
Winner	Will Davison; Mika Salo; Ford Performance Racing	2:16:06.9161

The 2012 Armor All Gold Coast 600 was a touring car motor race for V8 Supercars. It was the Round 12 of the 2012 International V8 Supercars Championship and the 22nd edition of the event. It occurred from 19 to 21 October at the Surfers Paradise Street Circuit on the Gold Coast, Queensland. Race 22 was won by Triple Eight Race Engineering's Jamie Whincup and Sébastien Bourdais from pole position. Will Davison and Mika Salo of Ford Performance Racing won the following day's second race from fourth place.

Whincup took the pole position by posting the fastest lap in the top ten shootout but lost his lead to Salo at the start which was twice red flagged for a total of 50 minutes because of two separate start-line crashes that reduced the distance of the race from 102 to 79 laps. Bourdais challenged Salo over laps 23 and 32 but he could not overtake Salo on both occasions as the latter struggled with acceleration. Whincup later relieved Bourdais and retook the lead, building a six-and-a-half-second advantage that was reduced to nothing when the safety car was deployed for debris retrieval. He held off Jonathon Webb for the rest of Race 22 to win for the 60th time in his career.

For Race 23, Whincup took his second consecutive pole position with the fastest lap time of qualifying. His co-driver Bourdais led the first 36 laps from Marc Lieb in second and Will Power in third before his first green flag pit stop for fuel, tyres and was relieved by Whincup. Salo led for the next 20 laps until his own stop and his car was driven by Davison. Tim Slade led the field after a safety car period for debris retrieval and he held it until Davison overtook him for the lead on the 80th lap. Davison maintained the lead for the remainder of the race to take his 13th career victory after holding off Whincup in the final five laps.

Whincup increased his Drivers' Championship lead with 3,060 points and Mark Winterbottom moved from third to second with 2,842 points. Craig Lowndes fell to third with 2,812 points and Will Davison's victory in Race 23 maintained him fourth with 2,503 points. In the Teams' Championship, Triple Eight Race Engineering led with 5,900 points over Ford Performance Racing in second with 5,285 points. Stone Brothers Racing and Holden Brothers Racing kept third and fourth with three rounds left in the season.

== Background ==
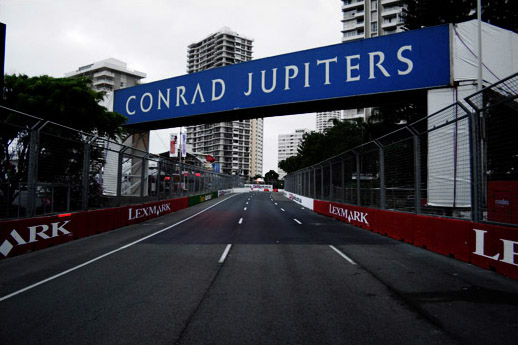
The Surfers Paradise Street Circuit (pictured in 2006), where the race was held.

The 2012 Armor All Gold Coast 600 was the 12th of the 15 touring car rounds of the Australian sedan-based V8 Supercars Championship, the third and final endurance round of the 2012 season, and the 22nd edition of the event. It took place on the weekend of the 19–21 October 2012 at the nine-turn 2.96 km (1.84 mi) temporary Surfers Paradise Street Circuit in Surfers Paradise, Queensland. The 2011 race saw the electronic detection sensors disabled and chicane bollards dismantled to allow drivers to cut those corners after claims of inconsistent decisions, causing the size of those kerbs to be enlarged to address the issue for the 2012 edition. Teams were informed via e-mail that a driver observed cutting the turns would get a pit lane drive-through or a minimum 50-point penalty.

After winning the Supercheap Auto Bathurst 1000 with co-driver Paul Dumbrell two weeks earlier, Triple Eight Race Engineering driver Jamie Whincup led the Drivers' Championship with 2,772 points. His teammate Craig Lowndes was 161 points behind in second and Ford Performance Racing's Mark Winterbottom was third with 2,584 points. Winterbottom's teammate Will Davison was fourth with 2,302 points and Shane van Gisbergen of Stone Brothers Racing was fifth with 2,020 points. In the Teams' Championship, Triple Eight Race Engineering led with 5,408 points; Ford Performance Racing was second with 4,886 points. Stone Brothers Racing and Holden Racing Team battled for third and Brad Jones Racing was in fifth place. Whincup and his international co-driver Sébastien Bourdais were the round's defending winners from 2011.

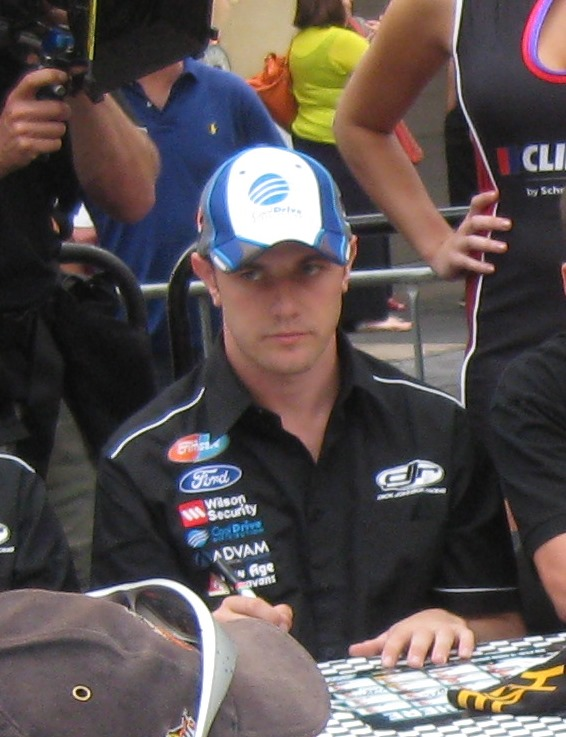
Tim Blanchard (pictured in 2013) replaced the injured Todd Kelly for the remainder of the season.

All 28 cars which contested the regular V8 Supercar season were entered in the race. Each car was driven by a full-time International V8 Supercar Championship driver, and a mandatory international guest driver who took part in a separate racing series. These guest drivers were recruited from a variety of racing categories, including the IndyCar Series (such as Will Power, partnering Winterbottom and Bourdais again joining Whincup), the World Endurance Championship (such as Darren Turner, partnering James Courtney), the FIA GT1 World Championship (such as Peter Kox, partnering James Moffat), the International Superstars Series (such as Gianni Morbidelli joining Dean Fiore), and the Rolex Sports Car Series (such as Ricky Taylor partnering Greg Ritter). Each international driver was required to complete a minimum of 34 laps out of the scheduled 102 in both races. There were two driver changes for the race. Todd Kelly was deemed unfit to compete in the remainder of the season due to a shoulder injury he picked up at a training camp, which required surgery. His car was driven by Tim Blanchard for the rest of the season, starting from the Gold Coast 600. Garry Rogers Motorsport replaced its regular driver Alexandre Prémat with Greg Ritter at the Gold Coast.

At the Bathurst 1000, a poor race from Winterbottom dropped him from second to third in the points standings. Afterwards he admitted his chances of becoming the Drivers' Champion was "on life support" but was aware that an error from Whincup or his international co-driver in the Gold Coast could effect the title. Lowndes's third-place at Bathurst moved him to second in the standings. He spoke of his certainty that Ford Performance Racing would improve, "No doubt FPR would be disappointed. They had two strong cars and one on pole and they didn't get a result. If TeamVodafone were in that position, it'd really annoy us. The championship's far from a foregone conclusion and both Will and Frosty will bounce back very strong." Whincup, the pre-race favourite, argued that Winterbottom and Davison should not be ruled out of the title fight and said he felt they would be a threat at the Gold Coast. Nevertheless, despite feeling demotivated due to burnout, he said that he wanted to race cleanly for the weekend and felt he would be motivated to win the race.

== Race 22 ==
=== Practice ===
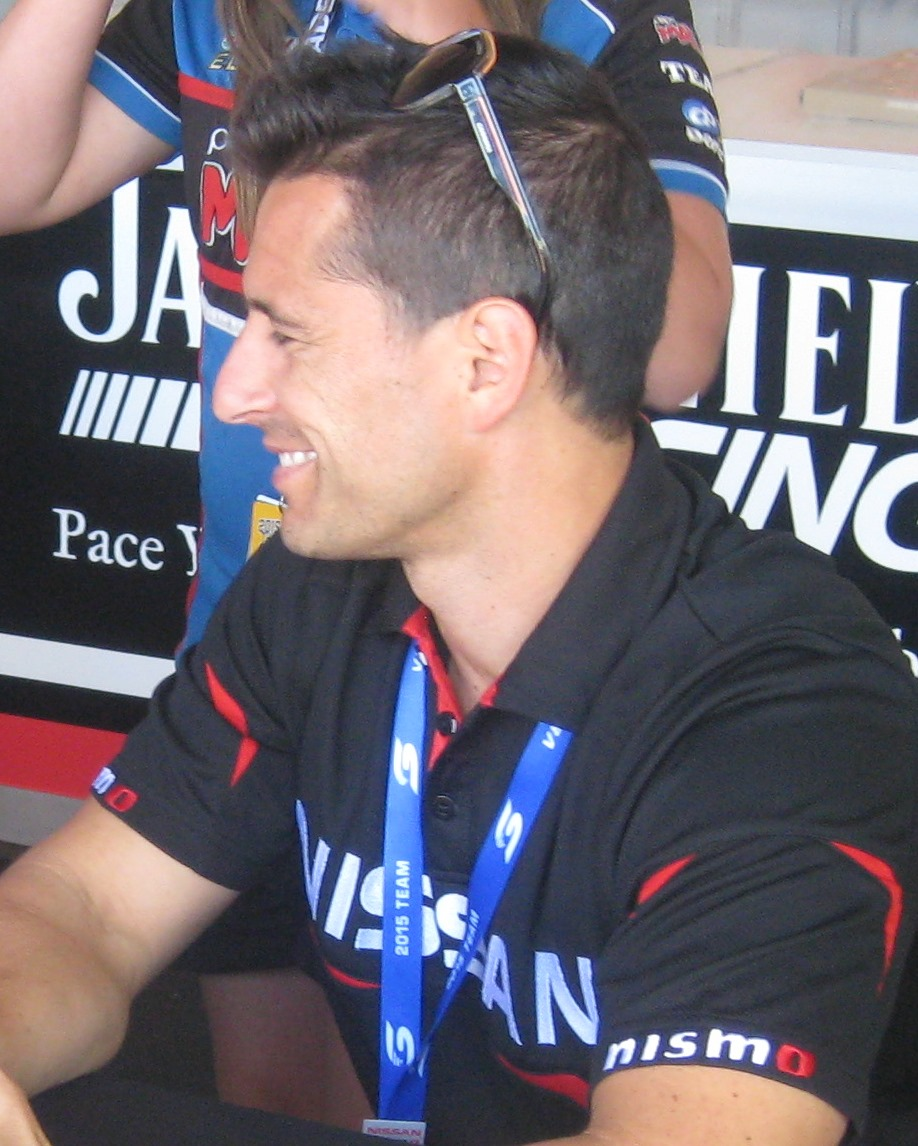
Michael Caruso (pictured in 2015) set the fastest practice lap time on Friday

A total of four 40-minute practice sessions were held on 19 October, with the second and third sessions restricted to the international co-drivers. The first morning session and the fourth session held in the late afternoon were open to all drivers. Davison lapped fastest in the first practice session at 1:12.0639, followed by Ritter, Winterbottom, Lowndes, Courtney, Rick Kelly, Holdsworth, Michael Caruso, Tony D'Alberto and Steve Owen. Ten minutes in, Taz Douglas prompted the session's first stoppage as he struck the turn 2 apex kerb and damaged his Holden Commodore VE2's left-hand side in a collision with the exit concrete wall. David Reynolds removed his car's left-hand side doors as a result of a sudden oversteer putting him into a barrier leaving the same corner and necessitating a second stoppage. The first of the international co-driver sessions was led by Marc Lieb with a lap of 1:13.0563 set in the final five minutes. Simon Pagenaud, Bourdais, Nick Heidfeld, Ryan Briscoe, Vitantonio Liuzzi, James Hinchcliffe, Turner, David Brabham and Stéphane Sarrazin made up positions two through ten. While the session passed without a major incident, Lucas di Grassi and Justin Wilson ventured onto the turn 11 escape road and Jamie Campbell-Walter went straight into the tyre barrier leaving the final hairpin.

Lieb again was fastest of all the international co-drivers with a 1:12.4763 time on his final lap of the third practice session. Briscoe, Pagenaud, Sarrazin, Richard Lyons, Brabham, Mika Salo, Bourdais, di Grassi and Heidfeld followed in the top ten. During the session, more drivers ventured onto the track's escape roads, and three drivers had crashes. Peter Dumbreck glanced the turn 14 exit barrier and Boris Said lightly touched the tyre barrier with his right-front corner at the exit to turn 9 after a suspected power steering failure. Said's teammate Kox made contact with the turn 14 wall and brought out the session's only red flag. In the final practice session, Caruso recorded the day's fastest lap time, a 1:11.6912, with 16 minutes left. Winterbottom, Reynolds, D'Alberto, Davison, Tim Slade, Moffat, Courtney and Lowndes made up positions two through ten. Garth Tander caused the session's sole stoppage when he locked a front wheel and broke his car's left-front suspension over the two kerbs. Jonathon Webb also broke his suspension at the same corner and abandoned his car at the side of the circuit two turns later.

After practice, several drivers including Winterbottom and Brabham called for the sensors on the kerbs to be removed because they argued that the presence of the higher kerb made them redundant, "What happens in the drivers' briefing is we all push for things but we don't always get what we are pushing for. There is a lot of outside influence in our sport from certain people who push for something else and shouldn't really be offering their opinion." Winterbottom stated. Courtney expressed his concern that the kerbing would cause tyres to delaminate that was observed in the 2011 event. The sensors were switched off before the first qualifying session on Friday night.

=== Qualifying and top ten shootout ===
Qualifying for Race 22 took place on Saturday morning and consisted of a half an hour session followed by an identically timed top ten shootout for the fastest ten qualifiers. Davison lapped fastest in the qualifying session at 1:11.3620. Whincup took second on his final lap of the session with Winterbottom third and Kelly fourth. Webb, Courtney, Caruso, d'Alberto, van Gisbergen and Fabian Coulthard were the final five drivers who advanced to the top ten shootout. Two red flags were necessitated for debris on the track and the third was needed to retrieve Moffat's car which stopped at turn 11 with a tailshaft failure. Tander ended his session early with a collision with the rear of David Wall's vehicle.

The top ten shootout had each of the ten fastest drivers from the qualifying session complete one fast lap each, in reverse order of their qualifying positions. Whincup took his fifth pole position of the season with a lap of 1:11.6478. He was joined on the grid's front row by Davison whose time was 0.2252 seconds slower. Kelly qualified third, Caruso fourth and Webb fifth. Sixth-placed Winterbottom's lap was disrupted by the event's broadcaster Seven Network broadcasting on his radio by accident and believed that his race engineer Campbell Little was trying to provide him with information before being informed that it was the commentary team. Coulthard, seventh, made contact with a wall. D'Alberto qualified eighth. Courtney in ninth had significant rear-brake locking and glanced the turn 11 barrier. Van Gisbergen in tenth lost time when an error put him onto the turn 11 escape road. Behind him, the rest of the grid lined up as Slade, Reynolds, Lowndes, Owen, Russell Ingall, Holdsworth, Moffat, Steven Johnson, Michael Patrizi, Ritter, Jason Bright, Greg Murphy, Karl Reindler, Tander, Blanchard, Douglas, Fiore and Wall.

==== Qualifying – Race 22 ====
Pos	No	Driver	Team	Vehicle	Time	Gap
1	6	(Australia) Will Davison	Ford Performance Racing	Ford FG Falcon	1:11.3620	
2	1	(Australia) Jamie Whincup	Triple Eight Race Engineering	Holden VE Commodore	1:11.4183	+ 0.056s
3	5	(Australia) Mark Winterbottom	Ford Performance Racing	Ford FG Falcon	1:11.5196	+ 0.158s
4	15	(Australia) Rick Kelly	Kelly Racing	Holden VE Commodore	1:11.6001	+ 0.238s
5	19	(Australia) Jonathon Webb	Tekno Autosports	Holden VE Commodore	1:11.6514	+ 0.289s
6	22	(Australia) James Courtney	Holden Racing Team	Holden VE Commodore	1:11.6893	+ 0.327s
7	34	(Australia) Michael Caruso	Garry Rogers Motorsport	Holden VE Commodore	1:11.7013	+ 0.339s
8	3	(Australia) Tony D'Alberto	Tony D'Alberto Racing	Ford FG Falcon	1:11.7645	+ 0.403s
9	9	(New Zealand) Shane van Gisbergen	Stone Brothers Racing	Ford FG Falcon	1:11.7789	+ 0.417s
10	14	(New Zealand) Fabian Coulthard	Brad Jones Racing	Holden VE Commodore	1:11.8040	+ 0.442s
11	47	(Australia) Tim Slade	James Rosenberg Racing	Ford FG Falcon	1:11.8249	+ 0.463s
12	55	(Australia) David Reynolds	Rod Nash Racing	Ford FG Falcon	1:11.8434	+ 0.481s
13	888	(Australia) Craig Lowndes	Triple Eight Race Engineering	Holden VE Commodore	1:11.8748	+ 0.513s
14	49	(Australia) Steve Owen	Paul Morris Motorsport	Holden VE Commodore	1:11.8761	+ 0.514s
15	66	(Australia) Russell Ingall	Walkinshaw Racing	Holden VE Commodore	1:11.9226	+ 0.561s
16	4	(Australia) Lee Holdsworth	Stone Brothers Racing	Ford FG Falcon	1:12.0095	+ 0.648s
17	18	(Australia) James Moffat	Dick Johnson Racing	Ford FG Falcon	1:12.0436	+ 0.682s
18	17	(Australia) Steven Johnson	Dick Johnson Racing	Ford FG Falcon	1:12.0519	+ 0.699s
19	91	(Australia) Michael Patrizi	Tekno Autosports	Holden VE Commodore	1:12.0682	+ 0.706s
20	33	(Australia) Greg Ritter	Garry Rogers Motorsport	Holden VE Commodore	1:12.1432	+ 0.781s
21	8	(Australia) Jason Bright	Brad Jones Racing	Holden VE Commodore	1:12.1475	+ 0.786s
22	51	(New Zealand) Greg Murphy	Kelly Racing	Holden VE Commodore	1:12.2718	+ 0.910s
23	11	(Australia) Karl Reindler	Kelly Racing	Holden VE Commodore	1:12.2786	+ 0.916s
24	2	(Australia) Garth Tander	Holden Racing Team	Holden VE Commodore	1:12.3608	+ 0.999s
25	7	(Australia) Tim Blanchard	Kelly Racing	Holden VE Commodore	1:12.4528	+ 1.091s
26	30	(Australia) Taz Douglas	Lucas Dumbrell Motorsport	Holden VE Commodore	1:12.7148	+ 1.353s
27	12	(Australia) Dean Fiore	Dick Johnson Racing	Ford FG Falcon	1:12.7304	+ 1.368s
28	21	(Australia) David Wall	Britek Motorsport	Holden VE Commodore	1:12.8859	+ 1.524s

==== Top ten shootout – Race 22 ====
Pos	No	Driver	Team	Time	Gap
1	1	(Australia) Jamie Whincup	Triple Eight Race Engineering	1:11.6478	
2	6	(Australia) Will Davison	Ford Performance Racing	1:11.8730	+ 0.225
3	15	(Australia) Rick Kelly	Kelly Racing	1:11.8841	+ 0.236s
4	34	(Australia) Michael Caruso	Garry Rogers Motorsport	1:11.9581	+ 0.310s
5	19	(Australia) Jonathon Webb	Tekno Autosports	1:11.9582	+ 0.310s
6	5	(Australia) Mark Winterbottom	Ford Performance Racing	1:11.9823	+ 0.335s
7	14	(New Zealand) Fabian Coulthard	Brad Jones Racing	1:12.1900	+ 0.542s
8	3	(Australia) Tony D'Alberto	Tony D'Alberto Racing	1:12.2253	+ 0.558s
9	22	(Australia) James Courtney	Holden Racing Team	1:12.4361	+ 0.788s
10	9	(New Zealand) Shane van Gisbergen	Stone Brothers Racing	1:27.0601	+ 15.412s

=== Race ===
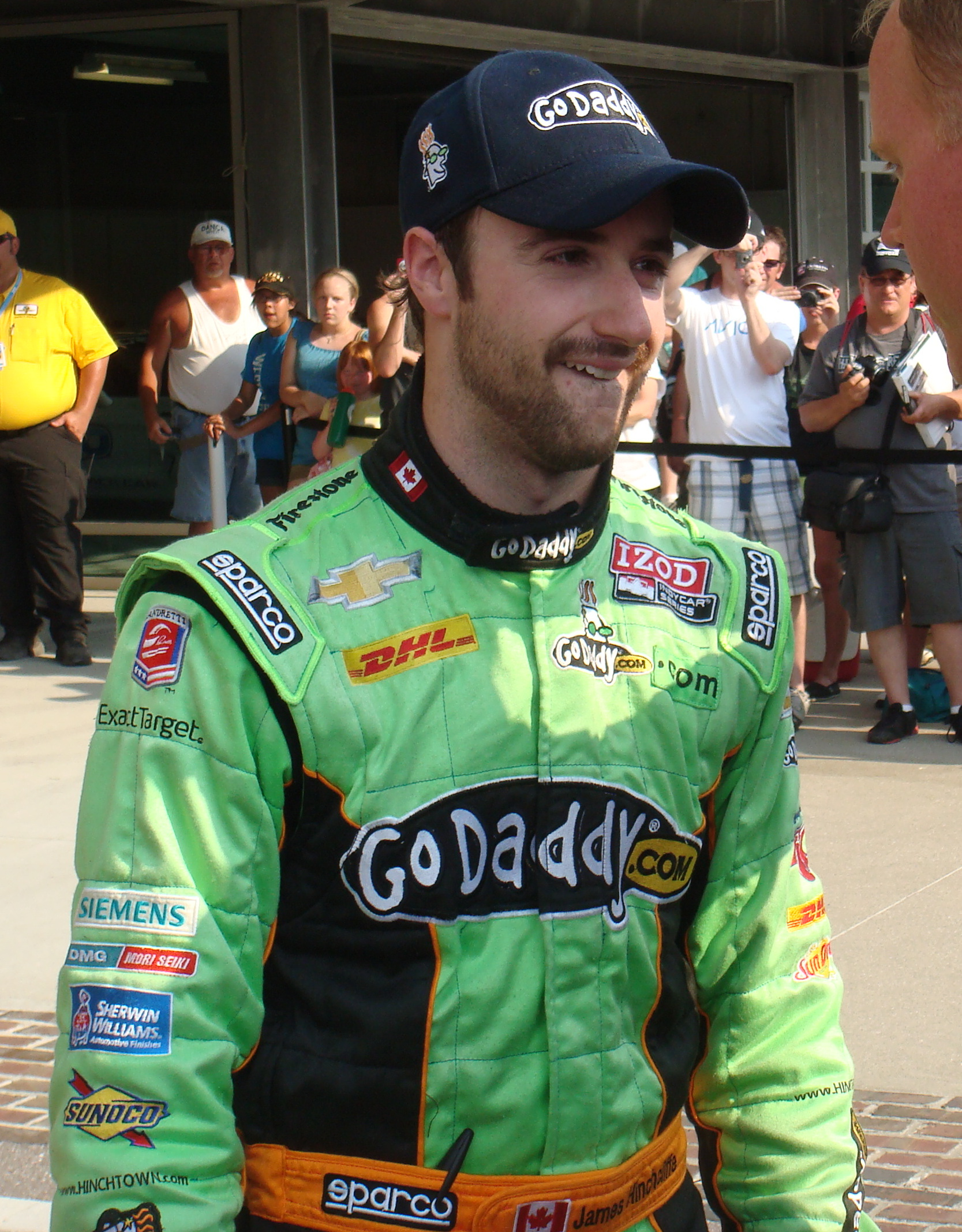
James Hinchcliffe stalled on the grid and his car caused a multi-car accident that stopped Race 22 for half an hour

Weather conditions at the start of the race at 13:40 Australian Eastern Standard Time (UTC+10:00) were dry, hot and clear with the air temperature at 30 °C (86 °F). Every car was started by its international co-driver. At the standing start, Hinchcliffe, partnering Caruso, made a slow getaway due to his stalling and Liuzzi rammed into his car's rear. Liuzzi, in turn, was hit by Pagenaud. Behind the pair, Taylor had no space to negotiate past and hit the front wheel of Pagenaud's vehicle at more than 100 km/h (62 mph). Taylor was turned onto his roof and barrel rolled several times before finishing upside down. The race was suspended for half an hour while the track was cleared of debris and the stricken vehicles removed. Sarrazin, Heidfeld and Morbidelli began from the pit lane due to technical problems caused by the original start. At the second start, Nicolas Minassian stalled his car and was missed by several drivers until he was collected by Franck Montagny at the rear. Montagny was hurled across the track and into a concrete barrier and the race was suspended for the second time.

Another 20 minutes passed until a third start was attempted by series officials. Bourdais was slow to start and Salo passed him for the lead into the first turn. Some drivers cut the corner to ensure that no multi-car accident would occur. Graham Rahal also made a quick start and temporarily held second until Bourdais overtook him at the hairpin. On lap three, Heidfeld passed Power for third. Bourdais sought pass Salo at turn one on the next lap but he backed out of the manoeuvre. That lap, Heidfeld overtook Brabham for eighth as he continued to drive quickly and Lieb attacked Rahal for third. On lap 8, Wilson overtook his teammate Marco Andretti at turn one before Andretti unsuccessfully challenged him at the fourth turn. The battle for third concluded on lap eleven as Lieb got past Rahal at turn four. On lap 13, Heidfeld overtook Lyons for seventh and Lyons immediately came under pressure from Brabham in eighth. As Bourdais gained on Salo for the lead, Morbidelli was hit by Campbell-Walter and crashed into the final corner wall three laps later, prompting the safety car's deployment.

The race was restarted on lap 19 with Salo leading, Bourdais second and Lieb third. Turner challenged Rahal for fourth but backed out before the entering the beach chicane. That lap, Kox hit the fence at turn eleven and Andretti struck his car's right-front, which had ricocheted back onto the track. The crash caused the safety car's second deployment. Kox's car was removed by track marshals and Salo retained the lead for the restart at lap 23. On the next lap, Bourdais moved to the inside of Salo at turn one but ran wide through the run-off area at full speed. Bourdais had to cede the lead back to Salo. However, Bourdais did succeed on the inside line on run to the first corner but Salo retook first at turn four. Lieb consequently got involved in the battle for the lead as Salo struggled with acceleration leaving the slower speed corners. Salo got his tyres up to temperature and stabilised the gap from lap 27. On the 31st lap, di Grassi overtook Power at turn four for eighth. Bourdais went to the inside of Salo entering turn one but went straight on at the chicane and gave the position back.

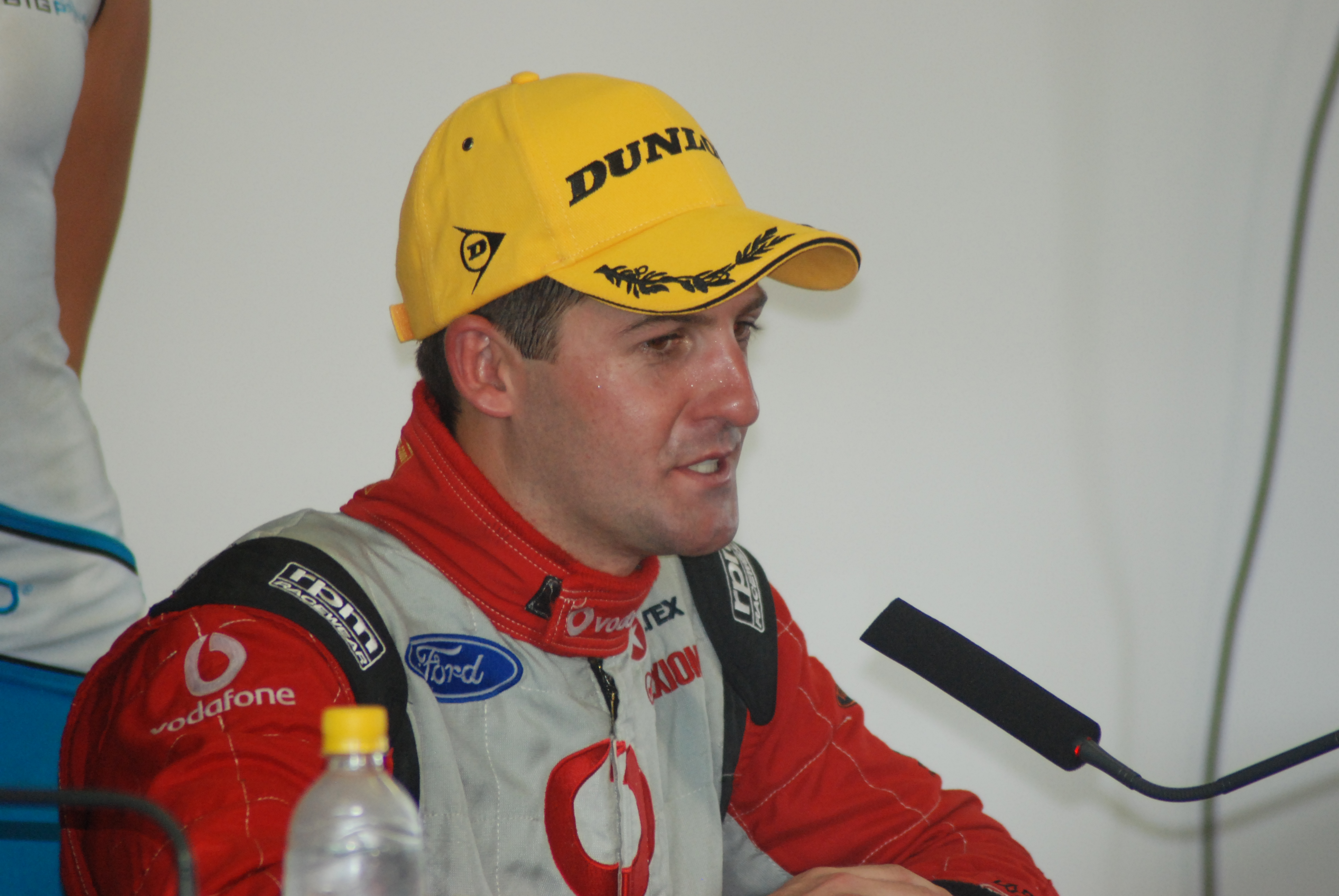
Jamie Whincup (pictured in 2007) won his 60th career victory after holding off Jonathon Webb in the event's final laps.

On the same lap, Turner was passed by Rahal at the beach chicane for fourth, but he cut the corner and had to cede the place to Turner. This provided Heidfeld with an opportunity to get ahead of Rahal and take over fifth. The first pit stops for fuel, tyres and driver changes began on the 35th lap with Bourdais stopping and was relieved by Whincup. Salo made his stop two laps later and gave the car to Davison. On lap 38, Whincup overtook Davison for the virtual lead. Two laps later, Davison's steering buckled and he crashed into the turn eleven tyre wall. Lowndes passed Kelly for eleventh on the road on the 42nd lap. Courtney short-cut the chicane during a battle with Webb for second place on lap 45 and got ahead of him at the twelfth corner for the position two laps later. Tander and Reynolds caught Courtney and Webb in the battle for second which had Tander unsuccessfully seeking his way past Webb at turn four on the 54th lap. The next lap, Courtney was overtaken by Webb to move into second at turn four. The third safety car was dispatched for debris on the track at the exit to turn eleven and Whincup's lead of six and a half seconds was reduced to nothing.

Racing resumed on lap 59 with Whincup first and Webb second. Tander held off Reynolds at turn four and Kelly was passed by Winterbottom at the beach chicane. On lap 60, Slade was overtaken by Winterbottom at turn four. Winterbottom caught Reynolds and attempted to get ahead on the inside of turn four two laps later but Reynolds blocked the pass. He did succeed at the same corner on the 65th lap and he overtook Tander on the inside for fourth in the same area. Reynolds retired with steering damage from contact with Tander at turn eleven on lap 66. On lap 68, Winterbottom advanced to third as he got ahead of Courtney on the inside for turn four. Courtney lost fourth to Tander at the same corner for fourth six laps later and fell to fifth when Slade passed him. Webb drew closer to Whincup but could not pass him as the latter had better acceleration leaving the hairpin and Whincup crossed the start/finish line after 79 laps out of the scheduled 102 laps to claim his 60th career victory. Webb and Lieb finished second and Winterbottom and Power took third. The final finishers were Tander, Slade, Lowndes, Courtney, Kelly, Ingall, van Gisbergen, Patrizi, Bright, Murphy, Douglas, Wall, Johnson, Fiore and Davison.

=== Post-race ===
Whincup said he ensured that he did not push on his worn tyres and declared his and Bourdais's happiness over the victory, "It was a crazy start to the race and I am sure it made for good television. It really threw us back in pit lane and we had to work out what to do. Our strategy had to change with the race being shortened. It turned into a one-stop race and everyone was massively on their toes. I didn't have to do much and just sat back and watched it all unfold." Webb explained that it was difficult for him and his co-driver Lieb during the race but he praised his team and the speed of his car. Winterbottom said finishing third was not good enough to help him in the title contest, "You've just got to try and keep winning each race and if you can keep winning it puts pressure on them. Third was a really good effort from the dramas we had ... that could be as good as a win if it all falls into place for you (but) deep down you've got to beat him week-in, week-out. Otherwise it's going to come down to Homebush [final event] and the only way you can beat him is if he doesn't turn up."

Regarding his first-lap accident, Taylor was unhurt; he said it was the first time in his career he had been turned upside down in a racing car, "I have never had as many cameras in my face either and unfortunately it is for all the wrong reasons. I feel very bad for the team because they have been so awesome all week. I didn't want it to end like this today – my job as a guest driver was to bring the car back in one piece and that didn't happen" Hinchcliffe explained he felt dizzy and the contact was one of the most hefty of his career, "I had a pretty good launch and then the thing just bogged. I saw cars going by and I was just starting to get the thing going again. Then I had this massive shunt in the rear. It is a tough break and it was a hard hit. I have backed an IndyCar into the wall on an oval and it wasn't quite that hard, but it was hard." Whincup defended the international co-drivers and said V8 Supercars are hard to start but praised those beginning at the front despite their unfamiliarity, "Back in the pack that's what happens but that's part of the sport. I’m sure a lot of the guys after a lot of false starts today will have had a bit of practice and will be much better tomorrow."

Tander was investigated for his contact with Reynolds that put the latter out of the event in the closing laps and he incurred a 25 championship points penalty from his season total after Tander admitted he was at fault to the stewards. He retained seventh in the points standings but was now 46 points behind sixth-placed Slade. Following the extensive amount of damage to the No. 3, 11 and 33 cars in the first two attempts to start the event, they were withdrawn from Race 23 as they could not be rebuilt in the Gold Coast. The race result left Whincup with an increased Drivers' Championship lead of 209 points. Lowndes retained second but Winterbottom now tied him with the same number of points (2,713 points). Davison maintained fourth place with 2,353 points and van Gisbergen completed the top five with 2,098 points. In the Teams' Championship, Triple Eight Race Engineering still led with 5,660 points and Ford Performance Racing kept second with 5,006 points. Stone Brothers Racing similarly retained third with 3,727 points. Holden Racing Team (3,640 points) and Brad Jones Racing (3,051 points) rounded out the top five.

==== Race 22 – Results ====
Pos	No	Driver	Team	Lap	Time / Retired	Grid
1	1	(Australia) Jamie Whincup (France) Sébastien Bourdais	Triple Eight Race Engineering	79	1hr 45min 10.0919sec	1
2	19	(Australia) Jonathon Webb (Germany) Marc Lieb	Tekno Autosports	79	+ 0.46 s	5
3	5	(Australia) Mark Winterbottom (Australia) Will Power	Ford Performance Racing	79	+ 1.10 s	3
4	2	(Australia) Garth Tander (Australia) Ryan Briscoe	Holden Racing Team	79	+ 12.22	25
5	47	(Australia) Tim Slade (Australia) David Brabham	James Rosenberg Racing	79	+ 12.95 s	11
6	888	(Australia) Craig Lowndes (United Kingdom) Richard Lyons	Triple Eight Race Engineering	79	+ 14.63 s	13
7	22	(Australia) James Courtney (United Kingdom) Darren Turner	Holden Racing Team	79	+ 17.15 s	6
8	15	(Australia) Rick Kelly (United States) Graham Rahal	Kelly Racing	79	+ 21.57 s	4
9	66	(Australia) Russell Ingall (United Kingdom) Peter Dumbreck	Walkinshaw Racing	79	+ 22.10 s	15
10	9	(New Zealand) Shane van Gisbergen (Netherlands) Jeroen Bleekemolen	Stone Brothers Racing	79	+ 22.59 s	9
11	91	(Australia) Michael Patrizi (Brazil) Lucas di Grassi	Tekno Autosports	79	+ 23.75 s	20
12	8	(Australia) Jason Bright (France) Stéphane Sarrazin	Brad Jones Racing	79	+ 23.97 s	22
13	51	(New Zealand) Greg Murphy (United Kingdom) Justin Wilson	Kelly Racing	79	+ 25.12 s	23
14	30	(Australia) Taz Douglas (United Kingdom) Mike Conway	Lucas Dumbrell Motorsport	79	+ 25.47 s	27
15	21	(Australia) David Wall (United Kingdom) Jamie Campbell-Walter	Britek Motorsport	79	+ 55.08 s	29
16	17	(Australia) Steven Johnson (Italy) Max Papis	Dick Johnson Racing	78	+ 1 Lap	19
17	12	(Australia) Dean Fiore (Italy) Gianni Morbidelli	Dick Johnson Racing	77	+ 2 Laps	28
18	6	(Australia) Will Davison (Finland) Mika Salo	Ford Performance Racing	63	+ 16 Laps	1
Ret	55	(Australia) David Reynolds (Germany) Nick Heidfeld	Rod Nash Racing	66	Retired	19
Ret	49	(Australia) Steve Owen (United States) Boris Said	Paul Morris Motorsport	40	Retired	14
Ret	7	(Australia) Tim Blanchard (United States) Marco Andretti	Kelly Racing	19	Retired	26
Ret	18	(Australia) James Moffat (Netherlands) Peter Kox	Dick Johnson Racing	18	Retired	17
Ret	34	(Australia) Michael Caruso (Canada) James Hinchcliffe	Garry Rogers Motorsport	0	Retired	7
Ret	33	(Australia) Greg Ritter (United States) Ricky Taylor	Garry Rogers Motorsport	0	Retired	21
Ret	11	(Australia) Karl Reindler (France) Franck Montagny	Kelly Racing	0	Retired	24
Ret	4	(Australia) Lee Holdsworth (France) Simon Pagenaud	Stone Brothers Racing	0	Retired	16
Ret	14	(New Zealand) Fabian Coulthard (France) Nicolas Minassian	Brad Jones Racing	0	Retired	10
Ret	3	(Australia) Tony D'Alberto (Italy) Vitantonio Liuzzi	Tony D'Alberto Racing	0	Retired	8

== Race 23 ==
=== Qualifying ===
A single half hour qualifying session, held on Sunday morning, was used to determine the grid for Race 23. A tyre bundle was assembled beforehand to prevent drivers from short-cutting the chicane at turn one. Whincup took his second consecutive pole position and his sixth of the season with a time of 1:11.1077 in the final five minutes of qualifying to repeat the achievement of clinching pole position for both Gold Coast races for the successive second year. He was joined on the grid's front row by Winterbottom whose best lap time was 0.1455 seconds slower and he had the pole position until Whincup's lap. Webb qualified in third, Davison fourth and Kelly fifth. Courtney, Lowndes, Owen, Moffat and van Gisbergen completed the top ten qualifiers. Slade, Tander, Ingall, Johnson, Holdsworth, Bright, Reynolds, Wall, Fiore, Coulthard, Caruso, Patrizi, Blanchard, Murphy and Douglas rounded out the 25 starters. The session was red flagged five times: the first three were to retrieve debris at the exit of turn 11 and the fourth was to replace a turn one tyre bundle that had been dislodged. The final stoppage was needed because Patrizi attempted to pass Bright on the inside line after Bright short-cut the turn 11 chicane; Patrizi made heavy frontal contact with an outside concrete barrier at turn 12. After qualifying, the No. 91 Tekno Autosports car of Patrizi and di Grassi was withdrawn due to the large amount of structural damage to it.

==== Qualifying – Race 23 ====
Pos	No	Driver	Team	Vehicle	Time	Gap
1	1	(Australia) Jamie Whincup	Triple Eight Race Engineering	Holden VE Commodore	1:11.1077	
2	5	(Australia) Mark Winterbottom	Ford Performance Racing	Ford FG Falcon	1:11.2532	+ 0.15 s
3	19	(Australia) Jonathon Webb	Tekno Autosports	Holden VE Commodore	1:11.3217	+ 0.21 s
4	6	(Australia) Will Davison	Ford Performance Racing	Ford FG Falcon	1:11.3444	+ 0.23 s
5	15	(Australia) Rick Kelly	Kelly Racing	Holden VE Commodore	1:11.3727	+ 0.27 s
6	22	(Australia) James Courtney	Holden Racing Team	Holden VE Commodore	1:11.5920	+ 0.48 s
7	888	(Australia) Craig Lowndes	Triple Eight Race Engineering	Holden VE Commodore	1:11.7332	+ 0.63 s
8	49	(Australia) Steve Owen	Paul Morris Motorsport	Ford FG Falcon	1:11.7685	+ 0.66 s
9	18	(Australia) James Moffat	Dick Johnson Racing	Ford FG Falcon	1:11.7922	+ 0.68 s
10	9	(New Zealand) Shane van Gisbergen	Stone Brothers Racing	Ford FG Falcon	1:11.8403	+ 0.73 s
11	47	(Australia) Tim Slade	James Rosenberg Racing	Ford FG Falcon	1:11.8832	+ 0.78 s
12	2	(Australia) Garth Tander	Holden Racing Team	Holden VE Commodore	1:11.9025	+ 0.79 s
13	66	(Australia) Russell Ingall	Walkinshaw Racing	Holden VE Commodore	1:11.9398	+ 0.83 s
14	17	(Australia) Steven Johnson	Dick Johnson Racing	Ford FG Falcon	1:11.9476	+ 0.84 s
15	4	(Australia) Lee Holdsworth	Stone Brothers Racing	Ford FG Falcon	1:12.0008	+ 0.89 s
16	8	(Australia) Jason Bright	Brad Jones Racing	Holden VE Commodore	1:12.0081	+ 0.90 s
17	55	(Australia) David Reynolds	Rod Nash Racing	Ford FG Falcon	1:12.0447	+ 0.94 s
18	21	(Australia) David Wall	Britek Motorsport	Holden VE Commodore	1:12.0458	+ 0.94 s
19	12	(Australia) Dean Fiore	Dick Johnson Racing	Ford FG Falcon	1:12.0574	+ 0.95 s
20	14	(New Zealand) Fabian Coulthard	Brad Jones Racing	Holden VE Commodore	1:12.0695	+ 0.96 s
21	34	(Australia) Michael Caruso	Garry Rogers Motorsport	Holden VE Commodore	1:12.1201	+ 1.01 s
22	91	(Australia) Michael Patrizi	Tekno Autosports	Holden VE Commodore	1:12.4186	+ 1.31 s
23	7	(Australia) Tim Blanchard	Kelly Racing	Holden VE Commodore	1:12.6142	+ 1.51 s
24	51	(New Zealand) Greg Murphy	Kelly Racing	Holden VE Commodore	1:12.6882	+ 1.58 s
25	30	(Australia) Taz Douglas	Lucas Dumbrell Motorsport	Holden VE Commodore	1:13.0722	+ 1.96 s

=== Race ===
Race 23 started at 13:40 local time in clear and hot weather conditions of 30 °C (86 °F). As with the previous event, all of the international co-drivers began in their respective cars. At the start, Kox had a drive shaft failure and several cars narrowly avoided ramming into the rear of him as Bourdais maintained his pole position advantage to lead the field into the first corner. The safety car was dispatched at the end of the first lap to remove Kox's vehicle and it remained on the circuit until the conclusion of the next lap. Bourdais held the lead and had a healthy gap over Lieb and Power in second and third. On lap six, Turner made light contact with Rahal in turn four in his unsuccessful attempt to overtake him for seventh. Lyons put Salo under heavy pressure on the following lap due to a lack of rear tyre grip as Turner managed to pass Rahal to move into seventh. Heidfeld was hit by Sarrazin and spun at turn four on lap 11 but he continued without any clear damage to his vehicle. On lap 13, the safety car was deployed for a second time after Lyons dislodged the top of the tyre wall at turn one during a battle with Turner and Salo over fifth.

Half of the field chose to make their compulsory pit stops for tyres under the safety car. Racing resumed at the start of lap 16 and Bourdais maintained the lead from Lieb and Power as the field drove through the first four turns without incident. On lap 17, Morbidelli spun on the exit to the beach chicane but he continued without any significant damage to his car despite some contact with the wall in the area. Sarrazin heavily hit the barrier at the same corner on the following lap and broke his upright rear suspension arm and had to retire his car. At the front, Bourdais began to pull away from the remainder of the field with a series of fastest lap times in the next five laps to have a five-and-a-half-second advantage by the 25th lap. After his pit stop where he had to replace his front flat-spotted tyres due to brake problems, Salo returned to the top ten on lap 28. On the next lap, Said lost tenth to Briscoe as Power and then overtook Jeroen Bleekemolen for ninth as Power closed up to Lieb and got the gap down to a second. A third deployment of the safety car was necessitated on the 30th lap as a large chunk of concrete was observed lying in the centre of turn three.

The race resumed on lap 33 as Bourdais continued to lead from Lieb and Power. That lap, Salo overtook Rahal for claim sixth at turn four and was followed by Briscoe doing the same Rahal. Green flag pit stops for fuel, tyres and driver changes began on the 34th lap. Bourdais made his stop two laps later and Whincup took over the No. 1 car. Salo took the lead as he could reach around lap 60 before making his own stop. In the meantime, Hinchcliffe and Caruso retired on lap 35 when their car had its right-rear wheel sheered as Caruso left the pit stall. On lap 46, Blanchard slid on the exit to the beach chicane but he avoided contact with the wall. Lowndes had a clutch hydraulic issue leaving the beach chicane dropping him behind Courtney for eleventh two laps later. Salo made his stop from the lead for replacement brake rotors on the 56th lap and was relieved by Davison. Brabham led until his lap 62 pit stop where Slade assumed his driving duties. Blanchard retired on lap 69 due to car damage. The safety car was dispatched for the fourth time as debris was observed on the track at turn 11 on lap 72 and Whincup took the opportunity to make a pit stop for fuel.

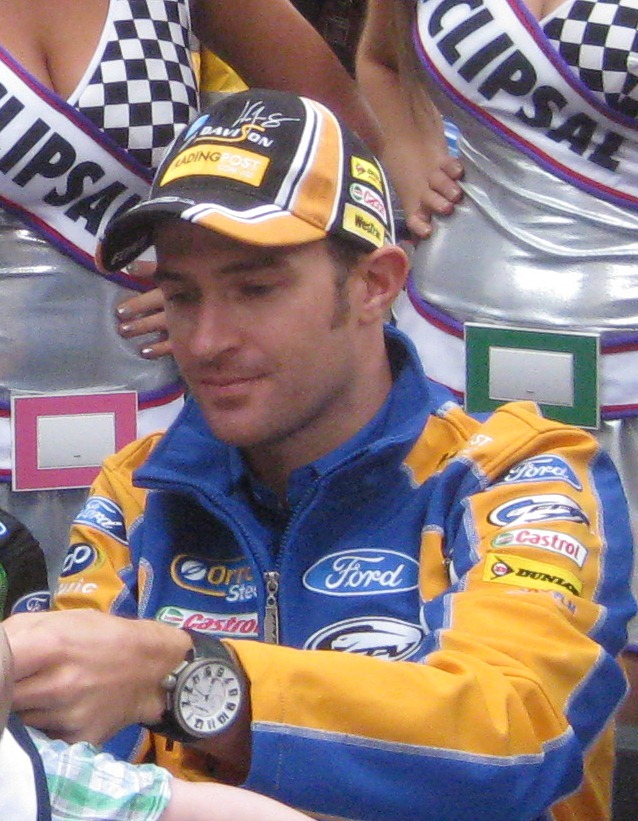
Will Davison held off Whincup in Race 23's final five laps to take his 13th career victory.

The safety car was withdrawn at the end of the 74th lap with Slade leading. Reynolds and Webb raced alongside each other into turn six during the next lap as Ingall defended from Winterbottom for fifth on lap 76. On the following lap, Winterbottom successfully passed Ingall for fifth on the back straight. Davison made contact with the rear of Slade's car as they battled for the lead through turn one on the 78th lap. On lap 80, Slade was passed on the inside by Davison for the lead entering turn four. That lap, Winterbottom overtook Tander for fourth. Whincup passed Slade on the inside for second at turn four after the two were alongside each other driving towards the chicane. Winterbottom then overtook Slade for third on lap 82. The safety car's fifth and final deployment came on lap 94 after a car door mirror was located in turn eleven. On lap 95, racing continued as Davison was slow to restart and caught out Whincup which closed the field up.

Winterbottom and Whincup collided leaving turn 15 on the next lap and the former failed to pass the latter at turn eleven on lap 97. Whincup set the fastest lap of the race on lap 99 with a 1:12.3001 time as he closed up to Davison. Courtney and Ingall made contact on the same lap, which forced Courtney into the pit lane to replace a front tyre because Ingall's exhaust cut it. Webb set a faster time on the next lap, a 1:12.2408. Davison led Whincup by half a second to begin the final lap and held him off for his 13th career victory. Whincup followed half a second later in second and Winterbottom duplicated his Race 22 result in third. Off the podium, Slade took fourth and Tander followed in fifth. Lowndes placed sixth, Ingall seventh and Holdsworth eighth. Van Gisbergen and Coulthard rounded out the top ten. The final classified finishers were Kelly, Johnson, Reynolds, Webb, Wall, Douglas, Courtney, Owen, Fiore and Murphy. Bourdais won the Dan Wheldon International Trophy as the highest-placed international co-driver for the second successive year.

=== Post-race ===
Davison said his team was under heavy pressure but praised Salo for helping contribute to his win, "It is fantastic to get another win as it feels like so long since my last one. I actually had to fight much harder than I thought as Tim [Slade] came out in front of me after the last stop which I hadn't thought of. Once I got past him I had to press on but also try and conserve my tyres which thankfully I had the car to do it with really easily." Whincup called his second-place finish "déjà vu" because he duplicated a victory and two pole positions in 2011 and enjoyed the race, "It was really on at that last restart. My tyres were pretty cold on those safety car laps but the car has been excellent and now we head into the last three events." Third-placed Winterbottom said an error in his pit stall cost him time and struggled to exit his box because of other cars around him, "We came out and tried as hard as we could but we used our rear tyres up a bit much getting back to the front. On the restart I tried to have a go at passing Jamie but he held his line and I couldn't do anymore from there."

The incidents at the start of both races led to calls for the international co-drivers to be barred from starting races with Holdsworth saying, "That's what happens when all the international drivers start the race. It wasn't Simon's fault, he got a ripper start. But a few of the guys up the front got shockers as they are not used to starting these cars. Holdsworth's co-driver Pagenaud concurred and noted that standing starts was a procedure that many international co-drivers were unfamiliar with, "It's a shame but starting where we did got us into trouble." Liuzzi spoke of his feeling that the narrowness of the Surfers Paradise Street Circuit configuration led to competitors making errors rather than their experience competing in V8 Supercars. Starting from the 2013 season, teams were no longer required to employ a co-driver from the international racing community but were allowed to partner with any co-driver from a national or international championship of their choosing. Slade said he was happy to finish fourth and believed he was "the best of the rest" of all the drivers competing in the Gold Coast.

The race results left Whincup as the Drivers' Championship leader with 3,060 points. Winterbottom (2,842 points) moved clear of Lowndes (2,815 points) in the battle for second place and Davison's victory kept him in fourth with 2,503 points. With 2,182 points, Van Gisbergen placed fifth overall. In the Teams' Championship, Triple Eight Racing Engineering retained their lead with 5,900 points. Ford Performance Racing were in second with 5,285 points and Stone Brothers Racing were third with 3,901 points. Holden Brothers Racing stood in fourth with 3,805 points and Brad Jones Racing were fifth with 3,129 points with three rounds left in the season. Despite his victory, Davison said that he admitted his chances of winning the Drivers' Championship were marginal but he vowed to push hard and claim whatever points he could earn for the remainder of the season. A record-braking 182,255 people attended the two-day event.

==== Race 23 – Results ====
Pos	No	Driver	Team	Lap	Time / Retired	Grid
1	6	(Australia) Will Davison (Finland) Mika Salo	Ford Performance Racing	102	2hr 16min 6.9161sec	4
2	1	(Australia) Jamie Whincup (France) Sébastien Bourdais	Triple Eight Race Engineering	102	+ 0.50 s	1
3	5	(Australia) Mark Winterbottom (Australia) Will Power	Ford Performance Racing	102	+ 2.19 s	2
4	47	(Australia) Tim Slade (Australia) David Brabham	James Rosenberg Racing	102	+ 4.76 s	11
5	2	(Australia) Garth Tander (Australia) Ryan Briscoe	Holden Racing Team	102	+ 6.72 s	12
6	888	(Australia) Craig Lowndes (United Kingdom) Richard Lyons	Triple Eight Race Engineering	102	+ 9.94 s	7
7	66	(Australia) Russell Ingall (United Kingdom) Peter Dumbreck	Holden Racing Team	102	+ 11.49 s	13
8	4	(Australia) Lee Holdsworth (France) Simon Pagenaud	Stone Brothers Racing	102	+ 11.61 s	15
9	9	(New Zealand) Shane van Gisbergen (Netherlands) Jeroen Bleekemolen	Stone Brothers Racing	102	+ 12.70 s	10
10	14	(New Zealand) Fabian Coulthard (France) Nicolas Minassian	Brad Jones Racing	102	+ 12.85 s	20
11	15	(Australia) Rick Kelly (United States) Graham Rahal	Kelly Racing	102	+ 13.90 s	5
12	17	(Australia) Steven Johnson (Italy) Max Papis	Dick Johnson Racing	102	+ 13.90 s	14
13	55	(Australia) David Reynolds (Germany) Nick Heidfeld	Rod Nash Racing	102	+ 14.57 s	17
14	19	(Australia) Jonathon Webb (Germany) Marc Lieb	Tekno Autosports	102	+ 17.01 s	3
15	21	(Australia) David Wall (United Kingdom) Jamie Campbell-Walter	Britek Motorsport	102	+ 18.00 s	18
16	30	(Australia) Taz Douglas (United Kingdom) Mike Conway	Lucas Dumbrell Motorsport	102	+ 21.38 s	19
17	22	(Australia) James Courtney (United Kingdom) Darren Turner	Holden Racing Team	102	+ 1:15.42 s	6
18	49	(Australia) Steve Owen (United States) Boris Said	Paul Morris Motorsport	101	+ 1 Lap	8
19	12	(Australia) Dean Fiore (Italy) Gianni Morbidelli	Dick Johnson Racing	91	+ 11 Laps	12
20	51	(New Zealand) Greg Murphy (United Kingdom) Justin Wilson	Kelly Racing	88	+ 14 Laps	24
Ret	7	(Australia) Tim Blanchard (United States) Marco Andretti	Kelly Racing	69	Retired	23
Ret	34	(Australia) Michael Caruso (Canada) James Hinchcliffe	Garry Rogers Motorsport	34	Retired	21
Ret	8	(Australia) Jason Bright (France) Stéphane Sarrazin	Brad Jones Racing	18	Retired	16
Ret	18	(Australia) James Moffat (Netherlands) Peter Kox	Dick Johnson Racing	0	Retired	9

== Championship standings after the event ==
Drivers' Championship standings

	Pos.	Driver	Points
	1	(Australia) Jamie Whincup	3,060
1	2	(Australia) Mark Winterbottom	2,842 (−218)
1	3	(Australia) Craig Lowndes	2,812 (−248)
	4	(Australia) Will Davison	2,503 (−557)
	5	(New Zealand) Shane van Gisbergen	2,182 (−878)

Teams' Championship standings

Pos.	Constructor	Points
1	Triple Eight Race Engineering	5,900
2	Ford Performance Racing	5,285 (−615)
3	Stone Brothers Racing	3,901 (−1,999)
4	Holden Brothers Racing	3,805 (−2,095)
5	Brad Jones Racing	3,129 (−2,771)

- Note: Only the top five positions are included for both sets of standings.
