= 2012 Dick Smith Sandown 500 =

2012 V8 Supercar championship race

(Victoria (state)) 2012 Dick Smith Sandown 500
Event Information
- Round 10 of 15 in the 2012 International V8 Supercars Championship
- Date: 14–16 September 2012
- Location: Melbourne, Victoria
- Venue: Sandown International Raceway
- Weather: Fine

Results
Race 1
Distance	161 laps	500 km
Pole position	Shane van Gisbergen; Luke Youlden; Stone Brothers Racing	
Winner	Craig Lowndes; Warren Luff; Triple Eight Race Engineering	3:19:14.8927

The 2012 Dick Smith Sandown 500 was a motor race for the Australian sedan-based V8 Supercars. It was the tenth event of the 2012 International V8 Supercars Championship. It was held on the weekend of 14–16 September at the Sandown Raceway, in Melbourne, Victoria.

It was the 42nd event to be held in the history of the Sandown 500 and the first to be held for V8 Supercars since 2007.

Craig Lowndes won his fifth Sandown 500, while co-driver Warren Luff broke through for his first victory in V8 Supercars, with the duo taking their Triple Eight Race Engineering Holden Commodore to the win over the Ford Performance Racing pair of Mark Winterbottom and Steven Richards.

This was the first endurance race held at the Sandown circuit to have a race average speed above 150 km/h. The 2012 record was finally broken in 2018.

== Results ==
=== Sandown 500 ===
==== Race ====
Pos.	No.	Name	Car	Team	Laps	Time/Retired	Grid	Points
1	888	(Australia) Craig Lowndes (Australia) Warren Luff	Holden VE Commodore	Triple Eight Race Engineering	161	3:19:14.8927	6	200
2	5	(Australia) Mark Winterbottom (New Zealand) Steven Richards	Ford FG Falcon	Ford Performance Racing	161	+ 1.6 s	16	184
3	1	(Australia) Jamie Whincup (Australia) Paul Dumbrell	Holden VE Commodore	Triple Eight Race Engineering	161	+ 4.7 s	19	172
4	2	(Australia) Garth Tander (Australia) Nick Percat	Holden VE Commodore	Holden Racing Team	161	+ 10.5 s	3	160
5	9	(New Zealand) Shane van Gisbergen (Australia) Luke Youlden	Ford FG Falcon	Stone Brothers Racing	161	+ 13.8 s	1	148
6	55	(Australia) David Reynolds (Australia) Dean Canto	Ford FG Falcon	Rod Nash Racing	161	+ 18.6 s	2	136
7	47	(Australia) Tim Slade (Australia) Andrew Thompson	Ford FG Falcon	James Rosenberg Racing	161	+ 19.0 s	9	128
8	4	(Australia) Lee Holdsworth (New Zealand) Craig Baird	Ford FG Falcon	Stone Brothers Racing	161	+ 24.7 s	13	120
9	22	(Australia) James Courtney (Australia) Cameron McConville	Holden VE Commodore	Holden Racing Team	161	+ 29.3 s	7	112
10	19	(Australia) Jonathon Webb (New Zealand) Scott McLaughlin	Holden VE Commodore	Tekno Autosports	161	+ 31.3 s	8	104
11	66	(Australia) Russell Ingall (Austria) Christian Klien	Holden VE Commodore	Walkinshaw Racing	161	+ 31.8 s	15	96
12	15	(Australia) Rick Kelly (Australia) David Russell	Holden VE Commodore	Kelly Racing	161	+ 37.7 s	5	92
13	8	(Australia) Jason Bright (Australia) Andrew Jones	Holden VE Commodore	Brad Jones Racing	161	+ 47.7 s	10	88
14	34	(Australia) Michael Caruso (Australia) Greg Ritter	Holden VE Commodore	Garry Rogers Motorsport	161	+ 52.3 s	4	84
15	14	(New Zealand) Fabian Coulthard (Australia) David Besnard	Holden VE Commodore	Brad Jones Racing	161	+ 54.2 s	18	80
16	12	(Australia) Dean Fiore (New Zealand) Matt Halliday	Ford FG Falcon	Triple F Racing	161	+ 1:02.0	21	76
17	6	(Australia) Will Davison (New Zealand) John McIntyre	Ford FG Falcon	Ford Performance Racing	161	+ 1:06.4	27	72
18	7	(Australia) Todd Kelly (Australia) Tim Blanchard	Holden VE Commodore	Kelly Racing	160	+ 1 lap	17	68
19	33	(France) Alexandre Prémat (Australia) Jack Perkins	Holden VE Commodore	Garry Rogers Motorsport	160	+ 1 lap	23	64
20	11	(Australia) Karl Reindler (New Zealand) Daniel Gaunt	Holden VE Commodore	Kelly Racing	160	+ 1 lap	25	60
21	17	(Australia) Steven Johnson (Denmark) Allan Simonsen	Ford FG Falcon	Dick Johnson Racing	160	+ 1 lap	12	56
22	21	(Australia) David Wall (New Zealand) Chris Pither	Holden VE Commodore	Britek Motorsport	159	+ 2 laps	20	52
23	3	(Australia) Tony D'Alberto (Australia) Dale Wood	Ford FG Falcon	Tony D'Alberto Racing	159	+ 2 laps	14	48
24	30	(Australia) Taz Douglas (Australia) Scott Pye	Holden VE Commodore	Lucas Dumbrell Motorsport	159	+ 2 laps	28	44
25	49	(Australia) Steve Owen (Australia) Paul Morris	Ford FG Falcon	Paul Morris Motorsport	159	+ 2 laps	22	40
26	18	(Australia) James Moffat (Australia) Alex Davison	Ford FG Falcon	Dick Johnson Racing	158	+ 3 laps	11	36
27	51	(New Zealand) Greg Murphy (Australia) Owen Kelly	Holden VE Commodore	Kelly Racing	132	+ 29 laps	26	32
Ret	91	(Australia) Michael Patrizi (New Zealand) Jonny Reid	Holden VE Commodore	Tekno Autosports	83	Accident	24	

== Standings ==
- After 20 of 30 races.

Pos	No	Name	Team	Points
1	1	Jamie Whincup	Triple Eight Race Engineering	2472
2	5	Mark Winterbottom	Ford Performance Racing	2440
3	888	Craig Lowndes	Triple Eight Race Engineering	2353
4	6	Will Davison	Ford Performance Racing	2236
5	9	Shane van Gisbergen	Stone Brothers Racing	1882
