= 2013 ITM 400 Auckland =

2013 V8 Supercar championship race

(New Zealand) 2013 ITM 400 Auckland
Event Information
- Round 3 of 14 in the 2013 International V8 Supercars Championship
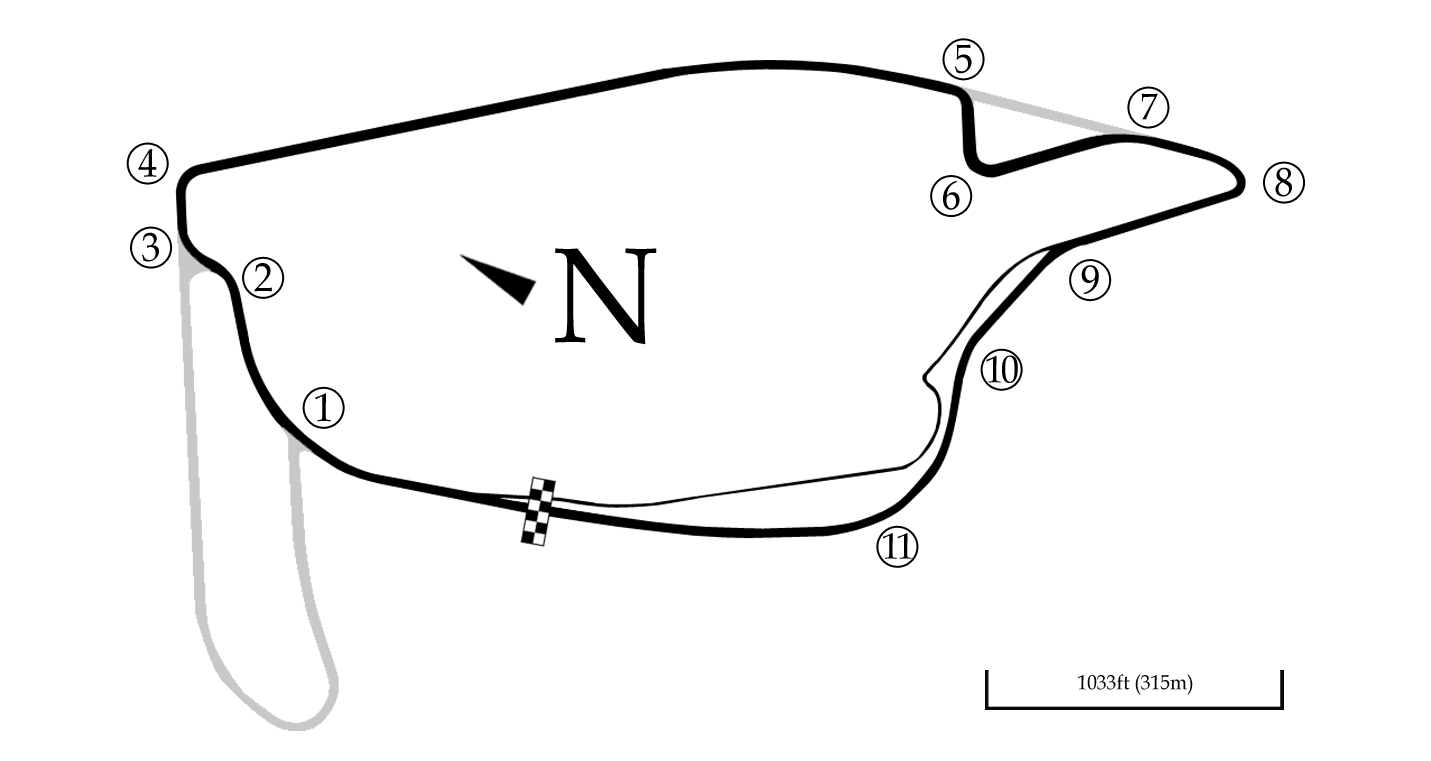
- Date: 12–14 April 2013
- Location: Pukekohe, New Zealand
- Venue: Pukekohe Park Raceway
- Weather: Fine

Results
Race 1
| Distance | 35 laps | 100 km |
| Pole position | Jamie Whincup; Triple Eight Race Engineering | 1:02.7600 |
| Winner | Scott McLaughlin; Garry Rogers Motorsport | 39:54.9225 |
Race 2
| Distance | 35 laps | 100 km |
| Pole position | Fabian Coulthard; Brad Jones Racing | 1:02.6310 |
| Winner | Jamie Whincup; Triple Eight Race Engineering | 42:32.8445 |
Race 3
| Distance | 35 laps | 100 km |
| Pole position | Jamie Whincup; Triple Eight Race Engineering | 1:02.7001 |
| Winner | Will Davison; Ford Performance Racing | 44:42.6509 |
Race 4
| Distance | 35 laps | 100 km |
| Pole position | Jason Bright; Brad Jones Racing | 1:02.6524 |
| Winner | Jason Bright; Brad Jones Racing | 37:39.1958 |

The 2013 ITM 400 Auckland was a motor race meeting for the Australasian sedan-based V8 Supercars Championship. It was the third event of the 2013 season and took place over four 100 kilometer races. Following the collapse of the Hamilton 400, this event marked the return of Pukekohe Park Raceway to the schedule and was the first running of the Auckland event since 2007.

The weekend saw the emergence of future champion, Scott McLaughlin, who captured his first win in the category after debuting full-time earlier that year. This year also saw the introduction of the Jason Richards Memorial Trophy; an award presented to the driver with the highest accumulated point total from the event. The inaugural trophy would be won by Jason Bright. It was an emotional win for Bright and his team, Brad Jones Racing. Richards had driven for the team and remained an integral part of the outfit before his death.

== Background ==
Not long after the V8 Supercar category started racing in New Zealand in 2001, Pukekohe's place on the calendar had remained in question. From 2004, alternative venues were explored, eventually culminating in the series leaving the Franklin venue for a street circuit in Hamilton from 2008 onwards. However, with the event reportedly costing the Hamilton ratepayer upwards of $40 million to host the event, the resulting friction between the local government and event organisers ultimately led to the series leaving the city after the 2012 event. In a bid to have the series return to Auckland, a race at Whenuapai airbase was explored for 2013 onwards. However, these plans never materialised, leaving negotiators back at square one and the series' future in New Zealand, once again, unclear.

After extensive talks regarding improvements to track facilities, a five-year agreement was penned between V8 Supercars, the Auckland Tourism Events and Economic Development (ATEED), New Zealand Government, Auckland Council and Counties Racing Club, to have the championship return to Pukekohe Park Raceway for 2013. Improvements to the circuit included track resurfacing, enhanced viewing areas and an additional overhead bridge between the hairpin and pit entry. The armco barriers around the circuit, which were a major source of contention regarding circuit safety, were replaced by concrete barriers, fit with catch fencing, left over by the now-defunct Hamilton event. Perhaps the biggest change made to the circuit ahead of its return was the introduction of a chicane on the back straight. This was initiated to arrest the high speeds of the cars, as well as create more overtaking opportunities. The cost of all aforementioned changes to the circuit totaled $6.6 million.

== Race report ==
=== Race 6 ===
==== Qualifying ====
| Pos. | No. | Name | Team | Car | Time |
|---|---|---|---|---|---|
| 1 | 1 | (Australia) Jamie Whincup | Triple Eight Race Engineering | Holden Commodore (VF) | 1:02.5597 |
| 2 | 14 | (New Zealand) Fabian Coulthard | Brad Jones Racing | Holden Commodore (VF) | 1:02.8534 |
| 3 | 5 | (Australia) Mark Winterbottom | Ford Performance Racing | Ford Falcon (FG) | 1:03.0533 |
| 4 | 34 | (France) Alexandre Prémat | Garry Rogers Motorsport | Holden Commodore (VF) | 1:03.0697 |
| 5 | 8 | (Australia) Jason Bright | Brad Jones Racing | Holden Commodore (VF) | 1:03.0861 |
| 6 | 888 | (Australia) Craig Lowndes | Triple Eight Race Engineering | Holden Commodore (VF) | 1:03.1018 |
| 7 | 97 | (New Zealand) Shane van Gisbergen | Tekno Autosports | Holden Commodore (VF) | 1:03.1028 |
| 8 | 55 | (Australia) David Reynolds | Rod Nash Racing | Ford Falcon (FG) | 1:03.1290 |
| 9 | 2 | (Australia) Garth Tander | Holden Racing Team | Holden Commodore (VF) | 1:03.1350 |
| 10 | 33 | (New Zealand) Scott McLaughlin | Garry Rogers Motorsport | Holden Commodore (VF) | 1:03.1526 |
| 11 | 6 | (Australia) Will Davison | Ford Performance Racing | Ford Falcon (FG) | 1:03.1925 |
| 12 | 22 | (Australia) James Courtney | Holden Racing Team | Holden Commodore (VF) | 1:03.1955 |
| 13 | 19 | (Australia) Jonathon Webb | Tekno Autosports | Holden Commodore (VF) | 1:03.3669 |
| 14 | 18 | (Australia) Alex Davison | Charlie Schwerkolt Racing | Ford Falcon (FG) | 1:03.3694 |
| 15 | 15 | (Australia) Rick Kelly | Nissan Motorsport | Nissan Altima (L33) | 1:03.3936 |
| 16 | 17 | (Australia) Tim Blanchard | Dick Johnson Racing | Ford Falcon (FG) | 1:03.4040 |
| 17 | 36 | (Australia) Michael Caruso | Nissan Motorsport | Nissan Altima (L33) | 1:03.4115 |
| 18 | 21 | (Australia) David Wall | Britek Motorsport | Holden Commodore (VF) | 1:03.4553 |
| 19 | 7 | (Australia) Todd Kelly | Nissan Motorsport | Nissan Altima (L33) | 1:03.4815 |
| 20 | 3 | (Australia) Tony D'Alberto | Tony D'Alberto Racing | Holden Commodore (VF) | 1:03.4895 |
| 21 | 4 | (Australia) Lee Holdsworth | Erebus Motorsport | Mercedes-Benz E63 AMG | 1:03.5145 |
| 22 | 66 | (Australia) Russell Ingall | Walkinshaw Racing | Holden Commodore (VF) | 1:03.5191 |
| 23 | 88 | (Australia) Dean Fiore | Lucas Dumbrell Motorsport | Holden Commodore (VF) | 1:03.5799 |
| 24 | 360 | (Australia) James Moffat | Nissan Motorsport | Nissan Altima (L33) | 1:03.6664 |
| 25 | 12 | (New Zealand) Jonny Reid | Dick Johnson Racing | Ford Falcon (FG) | 1:03.8677 |
| 26 | 9 | (Germany) Maro Engel | Erebus Motorsport | Mercedes-Benz E63 AMG | 1:03.9717 |
| 27 | 47 | (Australia) Tim Slade | James Rosenberg Racing | Mercedes-Benz E63 AMG | no time |

==== Top Ten Shootout ====
| Pos. | No. | Name | Team | Car | Time |
|---|---|---|---|---|---|
| 1 | 1 | (Australia) Jamie Whincup | Triple Eight Race Engineering | Holden Commodore (VF) | 1:02.7600 |
| 2 | 5 | (Australia) Mark Winterbottom | Ford Performance Racing | Ford Falcon (FG) | 1:03.0138 |
| 3 | 8 | (Australia) Jason Bright | Brad Jones Racing | Holden Commodore (VF) | 1:03.0468 |
| 4 | 33 | (New Zealand) Scott McLaughlin | Garry Rogers Motorsport | Holden Commodore (VF) | 1:03.2060 |
| 5 | 97 | (New Zealand) Shane van Gisbergen | Tekno Autosports | Holden Commodore (VF) | 1:03.3183 |
| 6 | 34 | (France) Alexandre Prémat | Garry Rogers Motorsport | Holden Commodore (VF) | 1:03.3438 |
| 7 | 2 | (Australia) Garth Tander | Holden Racing Team | Holden Commodore (VF) | 1:03.3923 |
| 8 | 55 | (Australia) David Reynolds | Rod Nash Racing | Ford Falcon (FG) | 1:03.7041 |
| 9 | 888 | (Australia) Craig Lowndes | Triple Eight Race Engineering | Holden Commodore (VF) | 1:04.6049 |
| EXC | 14 | (New Zealand) Fabian Coulthard | Brad Jones Racing | Holden Commodore (VF) | time excluded |

==== Race ====
Drama struck early as Whincup was eliminated from contention early owing to a puncture on the front-right tyre. He was forced to pit, ceded the lead to Winterbottom and emerged from the pitlane in last place. To pour salt on the wounds, he was then issued a drive-through penalty for speeding in the pitlane. Meanwhile, Premat was issued a 10-second time penalty for a false start.

On lap 12, Winterbottom's commanding lead was evaporated after his rear-left tyre exploded on the back straight. This misfortune gifted the lead to McLaughlin, much to the adulation of the local crowd. The excessive debris left from the tyre explosion warranted a safety car and thus limited the damage time-wise for Winterbottom. As the race resumed, McLaughlin sought to put as much distance between himself and the chasing pack. Premat was still yet to serve his penalty but for the time being remained a rear-gunner for his teammate. This lasted for only a couple laps, after which time, Premat speared off into the escape from at turn five. It was soon revealed that the brake pedal had gone to the floor and was forced to retire from the race. This left Bright free to chase after McLaughlin.

Tander strayed wide at turn three and lost third place to Lowndes. James Moffat was shuffled down the order when he slid off the track at turn three. McLaughlin withheld the pressure from Bright and came home to win the first race at Pukekohe since its return to the V8 Supercar calendar. This was also McLaughlin's first win in the category and Garry Rogers Motorsport's first win in since the 2010 Sydney 500.

| Pos. | No. | Name | Team | Laps | Time | Points |
|---|---|---|---|---|---|---|
| 1 | 33 | (New Zealand) Scott McLaughlin | Garry Rogers Motorsport | 35 | 39min 54.9226sec | 75 |
| 2 | 8 | (Australia) Jason Bright | Brad Jones Racing | 35 | + 0.82 | 69 |
| 3 | 888 | (Australia) Craig Lowndes | Triple Eight Race Engineering | 35 | + 1.31 | 64 |
| 4 | 97 | (New Zealand) Shane van Gisbergen | Tekno Autosports | 35 | + 2.46 | 60 |
| 5 | 14 | (New Zealand) Fabian Coulthard | Brad Jones Racing | 35 | + 3.29 | 55 |
| 6 | 2 | (Australia) Garth Tander | Holden Racing Team | 35 | + 4.80 | 51 |
| 7 | 6 | (Australia) Will Davison | Ford Performance Racing | 35 | + 5.03 | 48 |
| 8 | 55 | (Australia) David Reynolds | Rod Nash Racing | 35 | + 6.41 | 45 |
| 9 | 22 | (Australia) James Courtney | Holden Racing Team | 35 | + 7.71 | 42 |
| 10 | 19 | (Australia) Jonathon Webb | Tekno Autosports | 35 | + 11.22 | 39 |
| 11 | 18 | (Australia) Alex Davison | Charlie Schwerkolt Racing | 35 | + 11.59 | 36 |
| 12 | 15 | (Australia) Rick Kelly | Nissan Motorsport | 35 | + 12.63 | 34 |
| 13 | 36 | (Australia) Michael Caruso | Nissan Motorsport | 35 | + 13.16 | 33 |
| 14 | 66 | (Australia) Russell Ingall | Walkinshaw Racing | 35 | + 13.76 | 31 |
| 15 | 17 | (Australia) Tim Blanchard | Dick Johnson Racing | 35 | + 15.74 | 30 |
| 16 | 3 | (Australia) Tony D'Alberto | Tony D'Alberto Racing | 35 | + 16.09 | 28 |
| 17 | 7 | (Australia) Todd Kelly | Nissan Motorsport | 35 | + 16.73 | 27 |
| 18 | 4 | (Australia) Lee Holdsworth | Erebus Motorsport | 35 | + 17.47 | 25 |
| 19 | 5 | (Australia) Mark Winterbottom | Ford Performance Racing | 35 | + 17.87 | 24 |
| 20 | 88 | (Australia) Dean Fiore | Lucas Dumbrell Motorsport | 35 | + 20.28 | 22 |
| 21 | 21 | (Australia) David Wall | Britek Motorsport | 35 | + 20.77 | 21 |
| 22 | 360 | (Australia) James Moffat | Nissan Motorsport | 35 | + 21.73 | 19 |
| 23 | 12 | (New Zealand) Jonny Reid | Dick Johnson Racing | 35 | + 23.15 | 18 |
| 24 | 9 | (Germany) Maro Engel | Erebus Motorsport | 35 | + 23.81 | 16 |
| 25 | 47 | (Australia) Tim Slade | James Rosenberg Racing | 35 | + 24.24 | 15 |
| 26 | 1 | (Australia) Jamie Whincup | Triple Eight Race Engineering | 34 | + 1 lap | 13 |
| Ret | 34 | (France) Alexandre Prémat | Garry Rogers Motorsport | 19 | Brakes | 12 |
Fastest lap: Mark Winterbottom (Ford Performance Racing), 1:03.7638

=== Race 7 ===
==== Qualifying ====
| Pos. | No. | Name | Team | Car | Time |
|---|---|---|---|---|---|
| 1 | 14 | (New Zealand) Fabian Coulthard | Brad Jones Racing | Holden Commodore (VF) | 1:02.6310 |
| 2 | 888 | (Australia) Craig Lowndes | Triple Eight Race Engineering | Holden Commodore (VF) | 1:02.6774 |
| 3 | 1 | (Australia) Jamie Whincup | Triple Eight Race Engineering | Holden Commodore (VF) | 1:02.7217 |
| 4 | 6 | (Australia) Will Davison | Ford Performance Racing | Ford Falcon (FG) | 1:02.8310 |
| 5 | 5 | (Australia) Mark Winterbottom | Ford Performance Racing | Ford Falcon (FG) | 1:02.8897 |
| 6 | 2 | (Australia) Garth Tander | Holden Racing Team | Holden Commodore (VF) | 1:02.9474 |
| 7 | 55 | (Australia) David Reynolds | Rod Nash Racing | Ford Falcon (FG) | 1:02.9690 |
| 8 | 8 | (Australia) Jason Bright | Brad Jones Racing | Holden Commodore (VF) | 1:02.9938 |
| 9 | 33 | (New Zealand) Scott McLaughlin | Garry Rogers Motorsport | Holden Commodore (VF) | 1:03.0351 |
| 10 | 22 | (Australia) James Courtney | Holden Racing Team | Holden Commodore (VF) | 1:03.1014 |
| 11 | 97 | (New Zealand) Shane van Gisbergen | Tekno Autosports | Holden Commodore (VF) | 1:03.1498 |
| 12 | 15 | (Australia) Rick Kelly | Nissan Motorsport | Nissan Altima (L33) | 1:03.1895 |
| 13 | 4 | (Australia) Lee Holdsworth | Erebus Motorsport | Mercedes-Benz E63 AMG | 1:03.2062 |
| 14 | 34 | (France) Alexandre Prémat | Garry Rogers Motorsport | Holden Commodore (VF) | 1:03.2087 |
| 15 | 21 | (Australia) David Wall | Britek Motorsport | Holden Commodore (VF) | 1:03.2358 |
| 16 | 36 | (Australia) Michael Caruso | Nissan Motorsport | Nissan Altima (L33) | 1:03.2905 |
| 17 | 360 | (Australia) James Moffat | Nissan Motorsport | Nissan Altima (L33) | 1:03.2962 |
| 18 | 19 | (Australia) Jonathon Webb | Tekno Autosports | Holden Commodore (VF) | 1:03.3483 |
| 19 | 18 | (Australia) Alex Davison | Charlie Schwerkolt Racing | Ford Falcon (FG) | 1:03.3892 |
| 20 | 66 | (Australia) Russell Ingall | Walkinshaw Racing | Holden Commodore (VF) | 1:03.4415 |
| 21 | 88 | (Australia) Dean Fiore | Lucas Dumbrell Motorsport | Holden Commodore (VF) | 1:03.4802 |
| 22 | 9 | (Germany) Maro Engel | Erebus Motorsport | Mercedes-Benz E63 AMG | 1:03.8194 |
| 23 | 3 | (Australia) Tony D'Alberto | Tony D'Alberto Racing | Holden Commodore (VF) | 1:03.8495 |
| 24 | 7 | (Australia) Todd Kelly | Nissan Altima (L33) | Nissan Motorsport | 1:03.9588 |
| EXC | 12 | (New Zealand) Jonny Reid | Dick Johnson Racing | Ford Falcon (FG) | time excluded |
| EXC | 17 | (Australia) Tim Blanchard | Dick Johnson Racing | Ford Falcon (FG) | time excluded |

==== Race ====
Confusion reigned immediately as Fabian Coulthard jumped the start while Lee Holdsworth didn't move at all owing to a clutch issue. Coulthard's jump resulted in a ten-second penalty while Whincup and Lowndes scrapped for the effective lead of the race. The race remained relatively placid until lap 14 when Tim Slade spun off at turn one and was stranded on the circuit at turn two. He stalled and couldn't re-fire his car, thus resulting in a safety car.

When the race resumed, drivers jostled for position. A battle between Reynolds and Tander borked Bright who came under attack from van Gisbergen. The Tekno Autosports driver completed the move into turn one. But once they reached there, multiple drivers - including van Gisbergen, Bright, James Courtney and McLaughlin - spun off the track. Meanwhile, Winterbottom completed a move on teammate, Will Davison, and began his charge after the Triple Eight cars. Courtney's car was beached in the gravel trap and warranted a second safety car period.

Whincup took the affirmative lead from Coulthard shortly after the restart. Under pressure from Winterbottom, Lowndes slid off the track at the new chicane and fell out of the top ten. With a handful of laps to go, the gap between race leader Whincup and Winterbottom had come to nothing. On the final lap, Winterbottom attempted a move down the inside into the new chicane. However, he locked his rear brakes, careened into the side of Whincup's car and spun down the order. Whincup retained his lead all the way to the flag with Davison in second and Tander third.

| Pos. | No. | Name | Team | Grid | Time | Pts |
|---|---|---|---|---|---|---|
| 1 | 1 | (Australia) Jamie Whincup | Triple Eight Race Engineering | 3 | 42min 32.8445sec | 75 |
| 2 | 6 | (Australia) Will Davison | Ford Performance Racing | 4 | + 1.350 | 69 |
| 3 | 2 | (Australia) Garth Tander | Holden Racing Team | 6 | + 2.163 | 64 |
| 4 | 8 | (Australia) Jason Bright | Brad Jones Racing | 8 | + 3.338 | 60 |
| 5 | 55 | (Australia) David Reynolds | Rod Nash Racing | 7 | + 3.634 | 55 |
| 6 | 97 | (New Zealand) Shane van Gisbergen | Tekno Autosports | 11 | + 5.194 | 51 |
| 7 | 15 | (Australia) Rick Kelly | Nissan Motorsport | 12 | + 6.830 | 48 |
| 8 | 34 | (France) Alexandre Prémat | Garry Rogers Motorsport | 14 | + 7.301 | 45 |
| 9 | 360 | (Australia) James Moffat | Nissan Motorsport | 17 | + 8.185 | 42 |
| 10 | 14 | (New Zealand) Fabian Coulthard | Brad Jones Racing | 1 | + 10.672 | 39 |
| 11 | 19 | (Australia) Jonathon Webb | Tekno Autosports | 18 | + 11.132 | 36 |
| 12 | 36 | (Australia) Michael Caruso | Nissan Motorsport | 16 | + 13.027 | 34 |
| 13 | 5 | (Australia) Mark Winterbottom | Ford Performance Racing | 5 | + 13.839 | 33 |
| 14 | 66 | (Australia) Russell Ingall | Walkinshaw Racing | 20 | + 14.383 | 31 |
| 15 | 18 | (Australia) Alex Davison | Charlie Schwerkolt Racing | 19 | + 14.544 | 30 |
| 16 | 888 | (Australia) Craig Lowndes | Triple Eight Race Engineering | 2 | + 15.481 | 28 |
| 17 | 21 | (Australia) David Wall | Britek Motorsport | 15 | + 15.660 | 27 |
| 18 | 7 | (Australia) Todd Kelly | Nissan Motorsport | 21 | + 16.697 | 25 |
| 19 | 88 | (Australia) Dean Fiore | Lucas Dumbrell Motorsport | 21 | + 18.655 | 24 |
| 20 | 3 | (Australia) Tony D'Alberto | Tony D'Alberto Racing | 23 | + 18.873 | 22 |
| 21 | 9 | (Germany) Maro Engel | Erebus Motorsport | 22 | + 19.471 | 21 |
| 22 | 12 | (New Zealand) Jonny Reid | Dick Johnson Racing | 25 | + 19.472 | 19 |
| 23 | 17 | (Australia) Tim Blanchard | Dick Johnson Racing | 26 | + 19.769 | 18 |
| 24 | 33 | (New Zealand) Scott McLaughlin | Garry Rogers Motorsport | 9 | + 24.279 | 16 |
| 25 | 4 | (Australia) Lee Holdsworth | Erebus Motorsport | 13 | + 27.377 | 15 |
| 26 | 47 | (Australia) Tim Slade | James Rosenberg Racing | 27 | + 7 laps | 13 |
| Ret | 22 | (Australia) James Courtney | Holden Racing Team | 10 | Retired | 12 |
Fastest lap: Mark Winterbottom (Ford Performance Racing), 1:03.8565

=== Race 8 ===
==== Qualifying ====
| Pos. | No. | Name | Team | Car | Time |
|---|---|---|---|---|---|
| 1 | 1 | (Australia) Jamie Whincup | Triple Eight Race Engineering | Holden Commodore (VF) | 1:02.7001 |
| 2 | 5 | (Australia) Mark Winterbottom | Ford Performance Racing | Ford Falcon (FG) | 1:02.7917 |
| 3 | 14 | (New Zealand) Fabian Coulthard | Brad Jones Racing | Holden Commodore (VF) | 1:02.8210 |
| 4 | 22 | (Australia) James Courtney | Holden Racing Team | Holden Commodore (VF) | 1:02.9360 |
| 5 | 6 | (Australia) Will Davison | Ford Performance Racing | Ford Falcon (FG) | 1:02.9385 |
| 6 | 34 | (France) Alexandre Prémat | Garry Rogers Motorsport | Holden Commodore (VF) | 1:02.9691 |
| 7 | 33 | (New Zealand) Scott McLaughlin | Garry Rogers Motorsport | Holden Commodore (VF) | 1:02.9825 |
| 8 | 97 | (New Zealand) Shane van Gisbergen | Tekno Autosports | Holden Commodore (VF) | 1:03.0433 |
| 9 | 888 | (Australia) Craig Lowndes | Triple Eight Race Engineering | Holden Commodore (VF) | 1:03.0655 |
| 10 | 18 | (Australia) Alex Davison | Charlie Schwerkolt Racing | Ford Falcon (FG) | 1:03.1923 |
| 11 | 55 | (Australia) David Reynolds | Rod Nash Racing | Ford Falcon (FG) | 1:03.2439 |
| 12 | 8 | (Australia) Jason Bright | Brad Jones Racing | Holden Commodore (VF) | 1:03.2510 |
| 13 | 2 | (Australia) Garth Tander | Holden Racing Team | Holden Commodore (VF) | 1:03.2616 |
| 14 | 360 | (Australia) James Moffat | Nissan Motorsport | Nissan Altima (L33) | 1:03.3017 |
| 15 | 15 | (Australia) Rick Kelly | Nissan Motorsport | Nissan Altima (L33) | 1:03.3284 |
| 16 | 88 | (Australia) Dean Fiore | Lucas Dumbrell Motorsport | Holden Commodore (VF) | 1:03.3510 |
| 17 | 19 | (Australia) Jonathon Webb | Tekno Autosports | Holden Commodore (VF) | 1:03.3683 |
| 18 | 36 | (Australia) Michael Caruso | Nissan Motorsport | Nissan Altima (L33) | 1:03.4047 |
| 19 | 66 | (Australia) Russell Ingall | Walkinshaw Racing | Holden Commodore (VF) | 1:03.4333 |
| 20 | 7 | (Australia) Todd Kelly | Nissan Motorsport | Nissan Altima (L33) | 1:03.5053 |
| 21 | 3 | (Australia) Tony D'Alberto | Tony D'Alberto Racing | Holden Commodore (VF) | 1:03.5601 |
| 22 | 17 | (Australia) Tim Blanchard | Dick Johnson Racing | Ford Falcon (FG) | 1:03.5755 |
| 23 | 4 | (Australia) Lee Holdsworth | Erebus Motorsport | Mercedes-Benz E63 AMG | 1:03.5838 |
| 24 | 47 | (Australia) Tim Slade | James Rosenberg Racing | Mercedes-Benz E63 AMG | 1:03.6354 |
| 25 | 21 | (Australia) David Wall | Britek Motorsport | Holden Commodore (VF) | 1:03.6631 |
| 26 | 9 | (Germany) Maro Engel | Erebus Motorsport | Mercedes-Benz E63 AMG | 1:03.7884 |
| 27 | 12 | (New Zealand) Jonny Reid | Dick Johnson Racing | Ford Falcon (FG) | 1:03.9715 |

==== Race ====
| Pos. | No. | Name | Team | Laps | Time | Grid |
|---|---|---|---|---|---|---|
| 1 | 6 | (Australia) Will Davison | Ford Performance Racing | 32 | 44min 42.6510sec | 5 |
| 2 | 97 | (New Zealand) Shane van Gisbergen | Tekno Autosports | 32 | + 0.603 | 8 |
| 3 | 14 | (New Zealand) Fabian Coulthard | Brad Jones Racing | 32 | + 0.814 | 3 |
| 4 | 888 | (Australia) Craig Lowndes | Triple Eight Race Engineering | 32 | + 1.034 | 9 |
| 5 | 2 | (Australia) Garth Tander | Holden Racing Team | 32 | + 1.357 | 13 |
| 6 | 8 | (Australia) Jason Bright | Brad Jones Racing | 32 | + 2.062 | 12 |
| 7 | 55 | (Australia) David Reynolds | Rod Nash Racing | 32 | + 2.268 | 11 |
| 8 | 19 | (Australia) Jonathon Webb | Tekno Autosports | 32 | + 2.500 | 17 |
| 9 | 18 | (Australia) Alex Davison | Charlie Schwerkolt Racing | 32 | + 2.801 | 10 |
| 10 | 15 | (Australia) Rick Kelly | Nissan Motorsport | 32 | + 3.691 | 15 |
| 11 | 66 | (Australia) Russell Ingall | Walkinshaw Racing | 32 | + 3.856 | 19 |
| 12 | 88 | (Australia) Dean Fiore | Lucas Dumbrell Motorsport | 32 | + 4.332 | 16 |
| 13 | 360 | (Australia) James Moffat | Nissan Motorsport | 32 | + 4.579 | 14 |
| 14 | 36 | (Australia) Michael Caruso | Nissan Motorsport | 32 | + 5.582 | 18 |
| 15 | 7 | (Australia) Todd Kelly | Nissan Motorsport | 32 | + 5.864 | 20 |
| 16 | 47 | (Australia) Tim Slade | James Rosenberg Racing | 32 | + 6.431 | 24 |
| 17 | 4 | (Australia) Lee Holdsworth | Erebus Motorsport | 32 | + 7.072 | 23 |
| 18 | 12 | (New Zealand) Jonny Reid | Dick Johnson Racing | 32 | + 7.172 | 27 |
| 19 | 21 | (Australia) David Wall | Britek Motorsport | 32 | + 7.719 | 25 |
| 20 | 9 | (Germany) Maro Engel | Erebus Motorsport | 32 | + 8.455 | 26 |
| 21 | 34 | (France) Alexandre Prémat | Garry Rogers Motorsport | 32 | + 8.814 | 6 |
| 22 | 22 | (Australia) James Courtney | Holden Racing Team | 30 | + 2 laps | 4 |
| 23 | 5 | (Australia) Mark Winterbottom | Ford Performance Racing | 30 | + 2 laps | 2 |
| 24 | 1 | (Australia) Jamie Whincup | Triple Eight Race Engineering | 30 | + 2 laps | 1 |
| Ret | 33 | (New Zealand) Scott McLaughlin | Garry Rogers Motorsport | 27 | Retired | 7 |
| Ret | 17 | (Australia) Tim Blanchard | Dick Johnson Racing | 14 | Retired | 22 |
| Ret | 3 | (Australia) Tony D'Alberto | Tony D'Alberto Racing | 0 | Retired | 21 |
Fastest lap: Mark Winterbottom (Ford Performance Racing), 1:04.0783

=== Race 9 ===
==== Qualifying ====
| Pos. | No. | Name | Team | Car | Time |
|---|---|---|---|---|---|
| 1 | 8 | (Australia) Jason Bright | Brad Jones Racing | Holden Commodore (VF) | 1:02.6524 |
| 2 | 1 | (Australia) Jamie Whincup | Triple Eight Race Engineering | Holden Commodore (VF) | 1:02.6858 |
| 3 | 14 | (New Zealand) Fabian Coulthard | Holden Commodore (VF) | Brad Jones Racing | 1:02.7732 |
| 4 | 2 | (Australia) Garth Tander | Holden Commodore (VF) | Holden Racing Team | 1:02.8009 |
| 5 | 22 | (Australia) James Courtney | Holden Racing Team | Holden Commodore (VF) | 1:02.8963 |
| 6 | 5 | (Australia) Mark Winterbottom | Ford Performance Racing | Ford Falcon (FG) | 1:02.8966 |
| 7 | 33 | (New Zealand) Scott McLaughlin | Garry Rogers Motorsport | Holden Commodore (VF) | 1:02.9533 |
| 8 | 18 | (Australia) Alex Davison | Charlie Schwerkolt Racing | Ford Falcon (FG) | 1:03.0433 |
| 9 | 6 | (Australia) Will Davison | Ford Performance Racing | Ford Falcon (FG) | 1:03.0655 |
| 10 | 888 | (Australia) Craig Lowndes | Triple Eight Race Engineering | Holden Commodore (VF) | 1:03.1923 |
| 11 | 66 | (Australia) Russell Ingall | Walkinshaw Racing | Holden Commodore (VF) | 1:03.2439 |
| 12 | 55 | (Australia) David Reynolds | Rod Nash Racing | Ford Falcon (FG) | 1:03.2510 |
| 13 | 97 | (New Zealand) Shane van Gisbergen | Tekno Autosports | Holden Commodore (VF) | 1:03.2616 |
| 14 | 360 | (Australia) James Moffat | Nissan Motorsport | Nissan Altima (L33) | 1:03.3017 |
| 15 | 88 | (Australia) Dean Fiore | Lucas Dumbrell Motorsport | Holden Commodore (VF) | 1:03.3284 |
| 16 | 34 | (France) Alexandre Prémat | Garry Rogers Motorsport | Holden Commodore (VF) | 1:03.3510 |
| 17 | 36 | (Australia) Michael Caruso | Nissan Motorsport | Nissan Altima (L33) | 1:03.3683 |
| 18 | 3 | (Australia) Tony D'Alberto | Tony D'Alberto Racing | Holden Commodore (VF) | 1:03.4047 |
| 19 | 19 | (Australia) Jonathon Webb | Tekno Autosports | Holden Commodore (VF) | 1:03.4333 |
| 20 | 15 | (Australia) Rick Kelly | Nissan Motorsport | Nissan Altima (L33) | 1:03.5053 |
| 21 | 7 | (Australia) Todd Kelly | Nissan Motorsport | Nissan Altima (L33) | 1:03.5601 |
| 22 | 4 | (Australia) Lee Holdsworth | Erebus Motorsport | Mercedes-Benz E63 AMG | 1:03.5755 |
| 23 | 21 | (Australia) David Wall | Britek Motorsport | Holden Commodore (VF) | 1:03.5838 |
| 24 | 17 | (Australia) Tim Blanchard | Dick Johnson Racing | Ford Falcon (FG) | 1:03.6354 |
| 25 | 47 | (Australia) Tim Slade | James Rosenberg Racing | Mercedes-Benz E63 AMG | 1:03.7145 |
| 26 | 9 | (Germany) Maro Engel | Erebus Motorsport | Mercedes-Benz E63 AMG | 1:03.7217 |
| 27 | 12 | (New Zealand) Jonny Reid | Dick Johnson Racing | Ford Falcon (FG) | 1:03.8026 |

==== Race ====
| Pos. | No. | Name | Team | Laps | Time | Grid |
|---|---|---|---|---|---|---|
| 1 | 8 | (Australia) Jason Bright | Brad Jones Racing | 35 | 37min 39.1958sec | 1 |
| 2 | 2 | (Australia) Garth Tander | Holden Racing Team | 35 | + 5.299 | 4 |
| 3 | 1 | (Australia) Jamie Whincup | Triple Eight Race Engineering | 35 | + 6.348 | 2 |
| 4 | 14 | (New Zealand) Fabian Coulthard | Brad Jones Racing | 35 | + 6.650 | 3 |
| 5 | 6 | (Australia) Will Davison | Ford Performance Racing | 35 | + 7.314 | 9 |
| 6 | 22 | (Australia) James Courtney | Holden Racing Team | 35 | + 10.009 | 5 |
| 7 | 18 | (Australia) Alex Davison | Charlie Schwerkolt Racing | 35 | + 10.119 | 8 |
| 8 | 55 | (Australia) David Reynolds | Rod Nash Racing | 35 | + 10.782 | 12 |
| 9 | 888 | (Australia) Craig Lowndes | Triple Eight Race Engineering | 35 | + 15.103 | 10 |
| 10 | 360 | (Australia) James Moffat | Nissan Motorsport | 35 | + 18.375 | 14 |
| 11 | 97 | (New Zealand) Shane van Gisbergen | Tekno Autosports | 35 | + 24.373 | 13 |
| 12 | 34 | (France) Alexandre Prémat | Garry Rogers Motorsport | 35 | + 24.986 | 16 |
| 13 | 66 | (Australia) Russell Ingall | Walkinshaw Racing | 35 | + 28.974 | 11 |
| 14 | 7 | (Australia) Todd Kelly | Nissan Motorsport | 35 | + 29.432 | 21 |
| 15 | 15 | (Australia) Rick Kelly | Nissan Motorsport | 35 | + 30.030 | 20 |
| 16 | 36 | (Australia) Michael Caruso | Nissan Motorsport | 35 | + 30.385 | 17 |
| 17 | 3 | (Australia) Tony D'Alberto | Tony D'Alberto Racing | 35 | + 33.306 | 18 |
| 18 | 19 | (Australia) Jonathon Webb | Tekno Autosports | 35 | + 35.084 | 19 |
| 19 | 21 | (Australia) David Wall | Britek Motorsport | 35 | + 35.415 | 23 |
| 20 | 17 | (Australia) Tim Blanchard | Dick Johnson Racing | 35 | + 36.940 | 24 |
| 21 | 9 | (Germany) Maro Engel | Erebus Motorsport | 35 | + 37.810 | 26 |
| 22 | 4 | (Australia) Lee Holdsworth | Erebus Motorsport | 35 | + 38.240 | 22 |
| 23 | 47 | (Australia) Tim Slade | James Rosenberg Racing | 35 | + 38.919 | 25 |
| 24 | 5 | (Australia) Mark Winterbottom | Ford Performance Racing | 34 | + 1 lap | 6 |
| 25 | 12 | (New Zealand) Jonny Reid | Dick Johnson Racing | 34 | + 1 lap | 27 |
| Ret | 88 | (Australia) Dean Fiore | Lucas Dumbrell Motorsport | 6 | Retired | 15 |
Fastest lap: Jason Bright (Brad Jones Racing), 1:03.7947

== Aftermath ==
=== Championship standings ===
- After 9 of 36 races.

Drivers' Championship standings

| | Pos. | Driver | Points |
|---|---|---|---|
| 1 | 1 | (Australia) Will Davison | 697 |
| 1 | 2 | (Australia) Jamie Whincup | 666 |
| 1 | 3 | (Australia) Craig Lowndes | 591 |
| 6 | 4 | (Australia) Garth Tander | 553 |
| 2 | 5 | (New Zealand) Fabian Coulthard | 552 |

Teams' Championship standings

| | Pos. | Constructor | Points |
|---|---|---|---|
| | 1 | Triple Eight Race Engineering | 1197 |
| | 2 | Ford Performance Racing | 1145 |
| 2 | 3 | Brad Jones Racing | 1106 |
| 1 | 4 | Holden Racing Team | 1078 |
| 1 | 5 | Tekno Autosports | 1009 |

- Note: Only the top five positions are included for both sets of standings.
