= Tekno Autosports =

Australian motor racing team

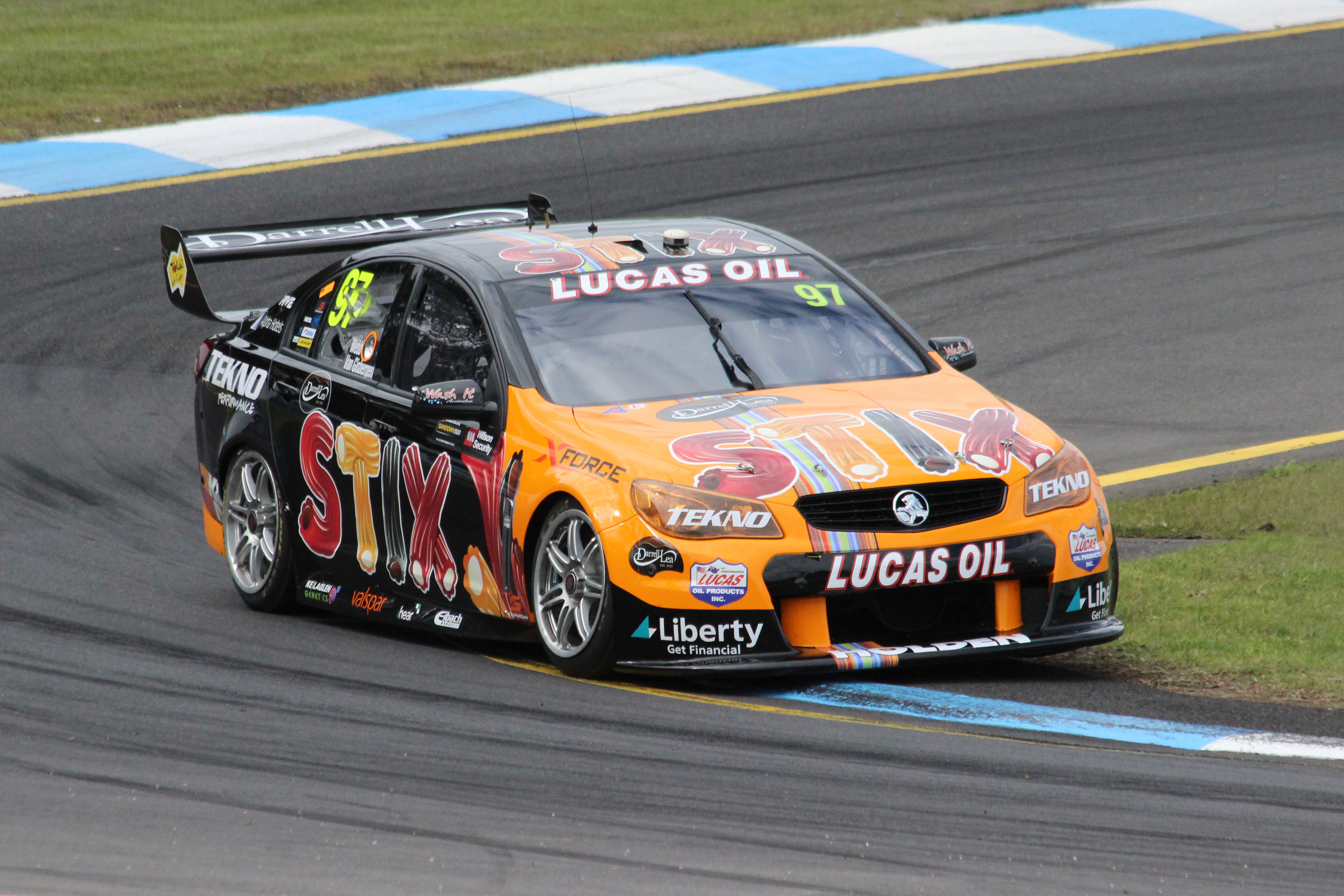
- Team Principal: Jonathon Webb; Kobe Webb; Stephen Webb
- Debut: 2010
- Final Season: 2021
- Round wins: 5
- Pole positions: 10
- 2021 position: 11th (1720 pts)

Tekno Autosports was an Australian motor racing team, established in the 1990s initially for the motor racing activities of Stephen Webb, and later his son Jonathon Webb. The team competed in the Supercars Championship using two Holden ZB Commodores built by Triple Eight Race Engineering. Fabian Coulthard and Garry Jacobson were the team's final drivers. At the end of 2021, the Supercars team was sold to Peter Xiberras and rebranded to PremiAir Racing.

In 2016, the team won both the Bathurst 12 Hour and Bathurst 1000.

== History ==
Formed originally as a Porsche team running in the Australian Porsche Cup by Steve Webb, having previously raced Kaditchas in the Australian Sports Car Championship and Ralts in the Australian Drivers' Championship. Webb raced Porsches with modest success for several seasons, moving into the Australian Nations Cup Championship, a GT based racing series, in 2000. Gradually as the 2000s progressed the team's emphasis shifted from Steve to Jonathon as he emerged through the ranks of Australian motor racers. Jonathon Webb joined the Australian Carrera Cup Championship when it was formed in 2003 and finished third in his best ever season in 2005.

=== V8 Supercar Development Series ===
For 2007, Tekno moved into the second-tier Fujitsu V8 Supercar Series and operated a Ford BA Falcon in the series with the assistance of Stone Brothers Racing. Under the racing number of #94, Webb placed fourth for the season. This relationship continued into 2008, with Webb placing third. In 2009, Tekno wound down as an operational racing team with Webb moving to the MW Motorsport team.

=== Supercars Championship ===
In 2010 Tekno entered what was then known as the V8 Supercar Championship Series with a Racing Entitlement Contract (REC) purchased from Tasman Motorsport. It linked up with veteran Queensland Ford racing team, Dick Johnson Racing with Webb racing a former Craig Lowndes Triple Eight Race Engineering Ford FG Falcon as #19. Mid-season, the team attained a title sponsor, Mother Energy Drinks. David Russell joined the team for the endurance events, the Phillip Island 500 and Bathurst 1000. Sebastian Bourdais joined the team for the Gold Coast 600. At the final event of the year, the 2010 Sydney Telstra 500, the team recorded their first win, with Webb winning the rain-affected Saturday race.

Tekno severed their relationship with Dick Johnson Racing in 2011 and became an independent single car team, still utilising the #19. The team maintained the sponsorship links with Mother Energy Drinks and had their engines built by InnoV8 Race Engines. Richard Lyons was the endurance co-driver for Phillip Island and Bathurst, with Gil de Ferran joining Webb for the Gold Coast 600.

The 2012 season saw the team expand to two cars which included a move to Holden and becoming a Triple Eight Race Engineering customer. Webb continued to drive the #19 car, with Michael Patrizi recruited to drive the #91 Commodore with a REC leased from Paul Morris Motorsport. Scott McLaughlin and Jonny Reid were the endurance drivers for Sandown and Bathurst, with Marc Lieb and Lucas di Grassi joining Webb and Patrizi respectively on the Gold Coast. Webb finished the 2012 season in 12th Position, with Patrizi in 18th despite competing without a full-time title sponsor all year.

Michael Patrizi was replaced in 2013 with Shane van Gisbergen, in a controversial move after van Gisbergen was granted a release from his Stone Brothers Racing contract on the basis he wanted time away from the sport. Both entries acquired new sponsors, with Darrell Lea sponsoring Webb's car #19 and VIP Petfoods van Gisbergen's #97 entry. Van Gisbergen quickly established himself a race winning threat in the team's new Triple Eight constructed Holden VF Commodore taking victory at Race 2 at the 2013 Clipsal 500 and Sydney 500. Webb also won the Skycity Triple Crown event despite not winning a race over the weekend. For the newly introduced Enduro Cup, Marc Lieb returned to join Webb, with Jeroen Bleekemolen joining van Gisbergen.

For 2014, the team returned to a single car operation with the leased REC returned to Paul Morris Motorsport and van Gisbergen driving the single entry to finish second in the championship. Webb joined van Gisbergen in the Enduro Cup, and after starting from pole, the pair were leading the 2014 Bathurst 1000 in the closing stages before a starter motor failed, leaving the car stuck in the pits for several minutes. In both 2014 and 2015, van Gisbergen and Webb won one race of the Gold Coast 600. Van Gisbergen finished fourth in the 2015 championship, only adding another race win at the Sydney 500 to his Gold Coast victory.

In 2016, Will Davison replaced van Gisbergen. The move brought near-immediate success, with the team winning the second round of the year, the Tasmania SuperSprint. After a lean patch in the middle of the year, Davison, partnered with Webb, returned to form at the Enduro Cup. After finishing third at Sandown, at the Bathurst 1000, Davison achieved an even better result, capitalising on late drama between the race leaders to take his second Bathurst crown, despite not leading any laps, only one tenth of a second ahead of van Gisbergen.

In 2020, the team will return to a two-car operation and relocate to Western Sydney.

In January 2022 the team was sold to Peter Xiberras and rebranded PremiAir Racing.

=== Endurance/GT racing ===
Tekno Autosports campaigned two McLaren 650S GT3 cars in the 2016 Liqui Moly Bathurst 12 Hour. Shane van Gisbergen, Jonathon Webb and Álvaro Parente won the race, with the sister car of Will Davison, Robert Bell and Andrew Watson finishing 9th. With a third car this relationship continued into the 2016 Australian GT Championship.

== Supercars Results ==
=== Car No. 19 results ===
Year	Driver	No.	Make	1	2	3	4	5	6	7	8	9	10	11	12	13	14	15	16	17	18	19	20	21	22	23	24	25	26	27	28	29	30	31	32	33	34	35	36	37	38	39	40	Position	Pts
2010	Jonathon Webb	19	Ford	YMC; R1; 8	YMC; R2; 18	BHR; R3; 14	BHR; R4; 16	ADE; R5; 15	ADE; R6; 15	HAM; R7; 13	HAM; R8; 10	QLD; R9; 10	QLD; R10; 12	WIN; R11; 26	WIN; R12; 11	HDV; R13; 24	HDV; R14; 13	TOW; R15; 16	TOW; R16; 9	PHI; QR; 18	PHI; R17; 6	BAT; R18; 19	SUR; R19; 8	SUR; R20; 16	SYM; R21; 18	SYM; R22; 16	SAN; R23; 20	SAN; R24; 9	SYD; R25; 1	SYD; R26; 10														13th	1852
2011	Jonathon Webb	19	Ford	YMC; R1; 20	YMC; R2; 6	ADE; R3; 14	ADE; R4; 11	HAM; R5; Ret	HAM; R6; 12	BAR; R7; 20	BAR; R8; 15	BAR; R9; 23	WIN; R10; 24	WIN; R11; 12	HID; R12; 22	HID; R13; 16	TOW; R14; 21	TOW; R15; Ret	QLD; R16; 26	QLD; R17; 20	QLD; R18; 22	PHI; QR; 13	PHI; R19; 18	BAT; R20; 13	SUR; R21; 9	SUR; R22; 13	SYM; R23; 21	SYM; R24; 9	SAN; R25; 11	SAN; R26; 16	SYD; R27; Ret	SYD; R28; 4												21st	1493
2012	Jonathon Webb	19	Holden	ADE; R1; 23	ADE; R2; DNS	SYM; R3; Ret	SYM; R4; 9	HAM; R5; 19	HAM; R6; 13	BAR; R7; 14	BAR; R8; 21	BAR; R9; 20	PHI; R10; 7	PHI; R11; 7	HID; R12; 9	HID; R13; 15	TOW; R14; 19	TOW; R15; 8	QLD; R16; Ret	QLD; R17; Ret	SMP; R18; 9	SMP; R19; 17	SAN; QR; 9	SAN; R20; 10	BAT; R21; 6	SUR; R22; 2	SUR; R23; 14	YMC; R24; 10	YMC; R25; 9	YMC; R26; EX	WIN; R27; 7	WIN; R28; 7	SYD; R29; 4	SYD; R30; 6										12th	1987
2013	Jonathon Webb	19	Holden	ADE; R1; 8	ADE; R2; 10	SYM; R3; 10	SYM; R4; 11	SYM; R5; 7	PUK; R6; 10	PUK; R7; 11	PUK; R8; 8	PUK; R9; 18	BAR; R10; 16	BAR; R11; 22	BAR; R12; 19	COA; R13; 7	COA; R14; 4	COA; R15; 4	COA; R16; 9	HID; R17; 4	HID; R18; 6	HID; R19; 4	TOW; R20; 22	TOW; R21; 12	QLD; R22; 26	QLD; R23; 15	QLD; R24; 14	WIN; R25; 20	WIN; R26; 24	WIN; R27; 22	SAN; QR; 23	SAN; R28; 13	BAT; R29; 12	SUR; R30; 10	SUR; R31; 17	PHI; R32; 18	PHI; R33; 18	PHI; R34; Ret	SYD; R35; 2	SYD; R36; 23				12th	1901
2016	Will Davison	19	Holden	ADE; R1; 11	ADE; R2; 9	ADE; R3; 15	SYM; R4; 3	SYM; R5; 1	PHI; R6; 16	PHI; R7; 9	BAR; R8; 4	BAR; R9; 10	WIN; R10; 6	WIN; R11; 17	HID; R12; 4	HID; R13; 4	TOW; R14; 5	TOW; R15; 11	QLD; R16; 7	QLD; R17; 17	SMP; R18; 21	SMP; R19; 26	SAN; QR; 10	SAN; R20; 3	BAT; R21; 1	SUR; R22; 16	SUR; R23; 13	PUK; R24; 10	PUK; R25; 6	PUK; R26; 8	PUK; R27; 13	SYD; R28; 7	SYD; R29; 8											5th	2589
2017	Will Davison	19	Holden	ADE; R1; Ret	ADE; R2; 13	SYM; R3; Ret	SYM; R4; DNS	PHI; R5; 9	PHI; R6; Ret	BAR; R7; 8	BAR; R8; 5	WIN; R9; 5	WIN; R10; 9	HID; R11; 13	HID; R12; 11	TOW; R13; 19	TOW; R14; 8	QLD; R15; 17	QLD; R16; Ret	SMP; R17; 12	SMP; R18; 12	SAN; QR; 25	SAN; R19; 12	BAT; R20; 14	SUR; R21; 20	SUR; R22; 14	PUK; R23; 12	PUK; R24; 23	NEW; R25; 9	NEW; R26; 9														15th	1659
2018	Jack Le Brocq	19	Holden	ADE; R1; 20	ADE; R2; 22	MEL; R3; 20	MEL; R4; 22	MEL; R5; 22	MEL; R6; 21	SYM; R7; 10	SYM; R8; 5	PHI; R9; 20	PHI; R10; 18	BAR; R11; 16	BAR; R12; 9	WIN; R13; 15	WIN; R14; 17	HID; R15; 18	HID; R16; Ret	TOW; R17; 22	TOW; R18; 18	QLD; R19; 21	QLD; R20; 10	SMP; R21; 9	BEN; R22; 16	BEN; R23; 18	SAN; QR; 20	SAN; R24; 22	BAT; R25; 15	SUR; R26; 16	SUR; R27; C	PUK; R28; 22	PUK; R29; 23	NEW; R30; 19	NEW; R31; 18									19th	1673
2019	Jack Le Brocq	19	Holden	ADE; R1; 20	ADE; R2; 21	MEL; R3; 20	MEL; R4; 20	MEL; R5; 15	MEL; R6; 23	SYM; R7; 22	SYM; R8; 22	PHI; R9; 20	PHI; R10; 20	BAR; R11; 20	BAR; R12; 22	WIN; R13; 20	WIN; R14; 20	HID; R15; Ret	HID; R16; 21	TOW; R17; 23	TOW; R18; 14	QLD; R19; 22	QLD; R20; 23	BEN; R21; 21	BEN; R22; 25	PUK; R23; 21	PUK; R24; 23	BAT; R25; 17	SUR; R26; 13	SUR; R27; 13	SAN; QR; 24	SAN; R28; 19	NEW; R29; Ret	NEW; R30; 17										22nd	1277
2020	James Courtney	19	Holden	ADE; R1; Ret	ADE; R2; 15	MEL; R3	MEL; R4	MEL; R5	MEL; R6																																			23rd	794
2020	Alex Davison	19	Holden	ADE; R1	ADE; R2	MEL; R3	MEL; R4	MEL; R5	MEL; R6	SMP1; R7; Ret	SMP1; R8; 17	SMP1; R9; 21	SMP2; R10; 20	SMP2; R11; 23	SMP2; R12; 20	HID1; R13; 16	HID1; R14; 17	HID1; R15; 24	HID2; R16; 18	HID2; R17; 22	HID2; R18; 20	TOW1; R19; 18	TOW1; R20; 22	TOW1; R21; 20	TOW2; R22; 13	TOW2; R23; 19	TOW2; R24; 15	BEN1; R25; 22	BEN1; R26; 20	BEN1; R27; 18	BEN2; R28; 22	BEN2; R29; DNS	BEN2; R30; DNS	BAT; R31; 12										23rd	794
2021	Fabian Coulthard	19	Holden	BAT; R1; 14	BAT; R2; 22	SAN; R3; 21	SAN; R4; 17	SAN; R5; 20	SYM; R6; 21	SYM; R7; Ret	SYM; R8; 13	BEN; R9; 20	BEN; R10; Ret	BEN; R11; 17	HID; R12; Ret	HID; R13; 16	HID; R14; 13	TOW; R15; 21	TOW; R16; Ret	TOW2; R17; Ret	TOW2; R18; 21	TOW2; R19; 20	SYD1; R20; 11	SYD1; R21; 23	SYD1; R22; Ret	SYD2; R23; 17	SYD2; R24; 14	SYD2; R25; 19	SYD3; R26; 16	SYD3; R27; 17	SYD3; R28; 22	SYD4; R29; 21	SYD4; R30; NC	BAT; R31; 19										24th	936

=== Car No. 22 results ===
Year	Driver	No.	Make	1	2	3	4	5	6	7	8	9	10	11	12	13	14	15	16	17	18	19	20	21	22	23	24	25	26	27	28	29	30	31	32	33	34	35	36	37	38	39	40	Position	Pts
2012	Michael Patrizi	91	Holden	ADE; R1	ADE; R2	SYM; R3	SYM; R4	HAM; R5	HAM; R6	BAR; R7	BAR; R8	BAR; R9	PHI; R10	PHI; R11	HID; R12	HID; R13	TOW; R14	TOW; R15	QLD; R16	QLD; R17	SMP; R18	SMP; R19	SAN; QR	SAN; R20	BAT; R21	SUR; R22	SUR; R23	YMC; R24	YMC; R25	YMC; R26	WIN; R27	WIN; R28	SYD; R29	SYD; R30										18th	1397
2013	Shane Van Gisbergen	97	Holden	ADE; R1; Ret	ADE; R2; 1	SYM; R3; 7	SYM; R4; 12	SYM; R5; 9	PUK; R6; 4	PUK; R7; 6	PUK; R8; 2	PUK; R9; 11	BAR; R10; 9	BAR; R11; 7	BAR; R12; 6	COA; R13; 26	COA; R14; 5	COA; R15; 5	COA; R16; 3	HID; R17; 2	HID; R18; 8	HID; R19; 6	TOW; R20; 17	TOW; R21; 3	QLD; R22; 12	QLD; R23; 17	QLD; R24; 11	WIN; R25; 13	WIN; R26; 5	WIN; R27; 5	SAN; QR; 14	SAN; R28; 12	BAT; R29; 11	SUR; R30; 2	SUR; R31; Ret	PHI; R32; 7	PHI; R33; 3	PHI; R34; 10	SYD; R35; 3	SYD; R36; 1				5th	2508
2014	Shane Van Gisbergen	97	Holden	ADE; R1; 3	ADE; R2; 16	ADE; R3; 3	SYM; R4; 11	SYM; R5; 11	SYM; R6; 7	WIN; R7; 2	WIN; R8; 20	WIN; R9; 12	PUK; R10; 2	PUK; R11; 5	PUK; R12; 1	PUK; R13; 4	BAR; R14; 25	BAR; R15; 19	BAR; R16; 20	HID; R17; 3	HID; R18; 7	HID; R19; 2	TOW; R20; 5	TOW; R21; 4	TOW; R22; 3	QLD; R23; 10	QLD; R24; 4	QLD; R25; 10	SMP; R26; 1	SMP; R27; 1	SMP; R28; 7	SAN; QR; 2	SAN; R29; 6	BAT; R30; 16	SUR; R31; 1	SUR; R32; 5	PHI; R33; 24	PHI; R34; 17	PHI; R35; 5	SYD; R36; 6	SYD; R37; 2	SYD; R38; 1		2nd	2781
2015	Shane Van Gisbergen	97	Holden	ADE; R1; 6	ADE; R2; 13	ADE; R3; 2	SYM; R4; 4	SYM; R5; 8	SYM; R6; 3	BAR; R7; 4	BAR; R8; 24	BAR; R9; 14	WIN; R10; 8	WIN; R11; 5	WIN; R12; 23	HID; R13; 12	HID; R14; 5	HID; R15; 4	TOW; R16; 10	TOW; R17; 20	QLD; R18; 4	QLD; R19; Ret	QLD; R20; 21	SMP; R21; 20	SMP; R22; 5	SMP; R23; 4	SAN; QR; 4	SAN; R24; 3	BAT; R25; 8	SUR; R26; 1	SUR; R27; 5	PUK; R28; 2	PUK; R29; 5	PUK; R30; 9	PHI; R31; 4	PHI; R32; 9	PHI; R33; 7	SYD; R34; 2	SYD; R35; 6	SYD; R36; 1				4th	2712
2020	Chris Pither	22	Holden	ADE; R1	ADE; R2	MEL; R3; C	MEL; R4; C	MEL; R5; C	MEL; R6; C	SMP1; R7	SMP1; R8	SMP1; R9	SMP2; R10	SMP2; R11	SMP2; R12	HID1; R13	HID1; R14	HID1; R15	HID2; R16	HID2; R17	HID2; R18	TOW1; R19	TOW1; R20	TOW1; R21	TOW2; R22	TOW2; R23	TOW2; R24	BEN1; R25	BEN1; R26	BEN1; R27	BEN2; R28	BEN2; R29	BEN2; R30	BAT; R31										20th	866
2021	Garry Jacobson	22	Holden	BAT; R1; Ret	BAT; R2; 20	SAN; R3; 20	SAN; R4; 20	SAN; R5; 19	SYM; R6; 20	SYM; R7; 19	SYM; R8; 24	BEN; R9; 24	BEN; R10; 14	BEN; R11; Ret	HID; R12; 18	HID; R13; Ret	HID; R14; 18	TOW; R15; 20	TOW; R16; 19	TOW2; R17; 18	TOW2; R18; 17	TOW2; R19; 17	SYD1; R20; 17	SYD1; R21; 22	SYD1; R22; 21	SYD2; R23; 20	SYD2; R24; 23	SYD2; R25; 12	SYD3; R26; 15	SYD3; R27; 24	SYD3; R28; 18	SYD4; R29; 22	SYD4; R30; NC	BAT; R31; 14										22nd	1003

=== Bathurst 1000 results ===
Year	No.	Car	Drivers	Position	Laps
2010	19	Ford Falcon FG	(Australia) Jonathon Webb (Australia) David Russell	19th	161
2011	19	Ford Falcon FG	(Australia) Jonathon Webb (United Kingdom) Richard Lyons	13th	161
2012	19	Holden Commodore VE	(Australia) Jonathon Webb (New Zealand) Scott McLaughlin	6th	161
2012	91	Holden Commodore VE	(Australia) Michael Patrizi (New Zealand) Jonny Reid	DNF	19
2013	19	Holden Commodore VF	(Australia) Jonathon Webb (Germany) Marc Lieb	12th	161
2013	97	Holden Commodore VF	(New Zealand) Shane van Gisbergen (Netherlands) Jeroen Bleekemolen	11th	161
2014	97	Holden Commodore VF	(New Zealand) Shane van Gisbergen (Australia) Jonathon Webb	16th	158
2015	97	Holden Commodore VF	(New Zealand) Shane van Gisbergen (Australia) Jonathon Webb	8th	161
2016	19	Holden Commodore VF	(Australia) Will Davison (Australia) Jonathon Webb	1st	161
2017	19	Holden Commodore VF	(Australia) Will Davison (Australia) Jonathon Webb	14th	159
2018	19	Holden Commodore ZB	(Australia) Jack Le Brocq (Australia) Jonathon Webb	15th	161
2019	19	Holden Commodore ZB	(Australia) Jack Le Brocq (Australia) Jonathon Webb	17th	160
2020	19	Holden Commodore ZB	(Australia) Alex Davison (Australia) Jonathon Webb	12th	161
2020	22	Holden Commodore ZB	(New Zealand) Chris Pither (Australia) Steve Owen	16th	159
2021	19	Holden Commodore ZB	(New Zealand) Fabian Coulthard (Australia) Jonathon Webb	19th	156
2021	22	Holden Commodore ZB	(Australia) Garry Jacobson (Australia) Dylan O'Keeffe	14th	161

== Supercars Championship drivers ==
The following is a list of drivers who have driven for the team in the Supercars Championship, in order of their first appearance. Drivers who only drove for the team on a part-time basis are listed in italics.

- (Australia) Jonathon Webb (2010–21)
- (Australia) David Russell (2010)
- (France) Sébastien Bourdais (2010)
- (United Kingdom) Richard Lyons (2011)
- (Brazil) Gil de Ferran (2011)
- (Australia) Michael Patrizi (2012)
- (New Zealand) Scott McLaughlin (2012)
- (New Zealand) Jonny Reid (2012)
- (Germany) Marc Lieb (2012–13)
- (Brazil) Lucas di Grassi (2012)
- (New Zealand) Shane van Gisbergen (2013–15)
- (Netherlands) Jeroen Bleekemolen (2013)
- (Australia) Will Davison (2016–17)
- (Australia) Jack Le Brocq (2018–19)
- (Australia) James Courtney (2020)
- (New Zealand) Chris Pither (2020)
- (Australia) Alex Davison (2020)
- (Australia) Steve Owen (2020)
- (New Zealand) Fabian Coulthard (2021)
- (Australia) Garry Jacobson (2021)
- (Australia) Dylan O'Keeffe (2021)

== Gallery ==
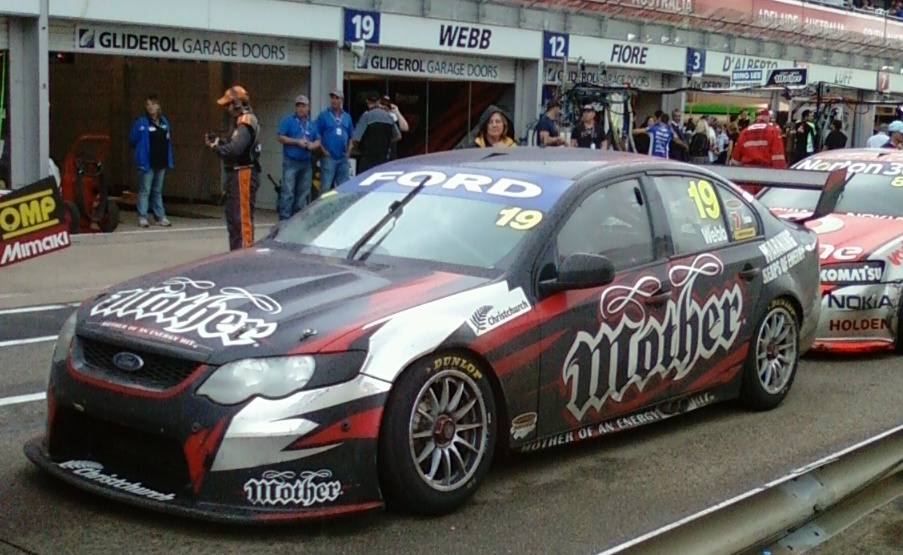
The Ford FG Falcon of Jonathon Webb at the 2011 Clipsal 500 Adelaide.

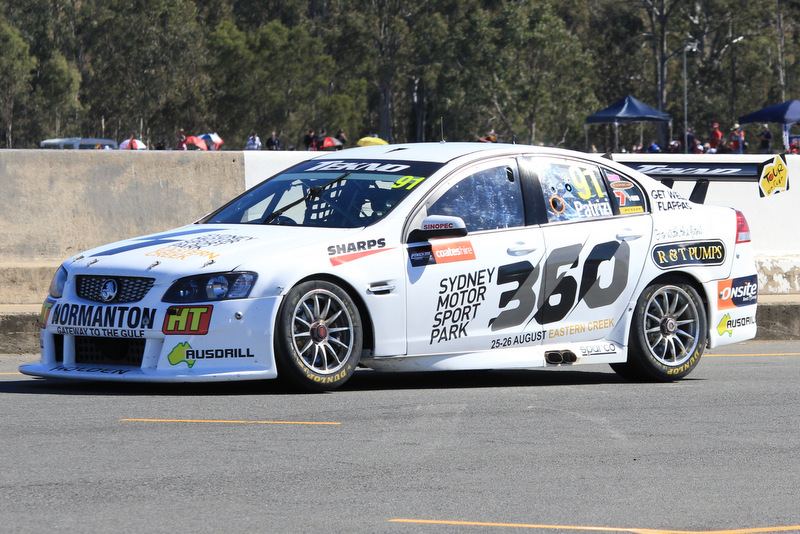
The Holden VE Commodore of Michael Patrizi at the 2012 Coates Hire Ipswich 300.

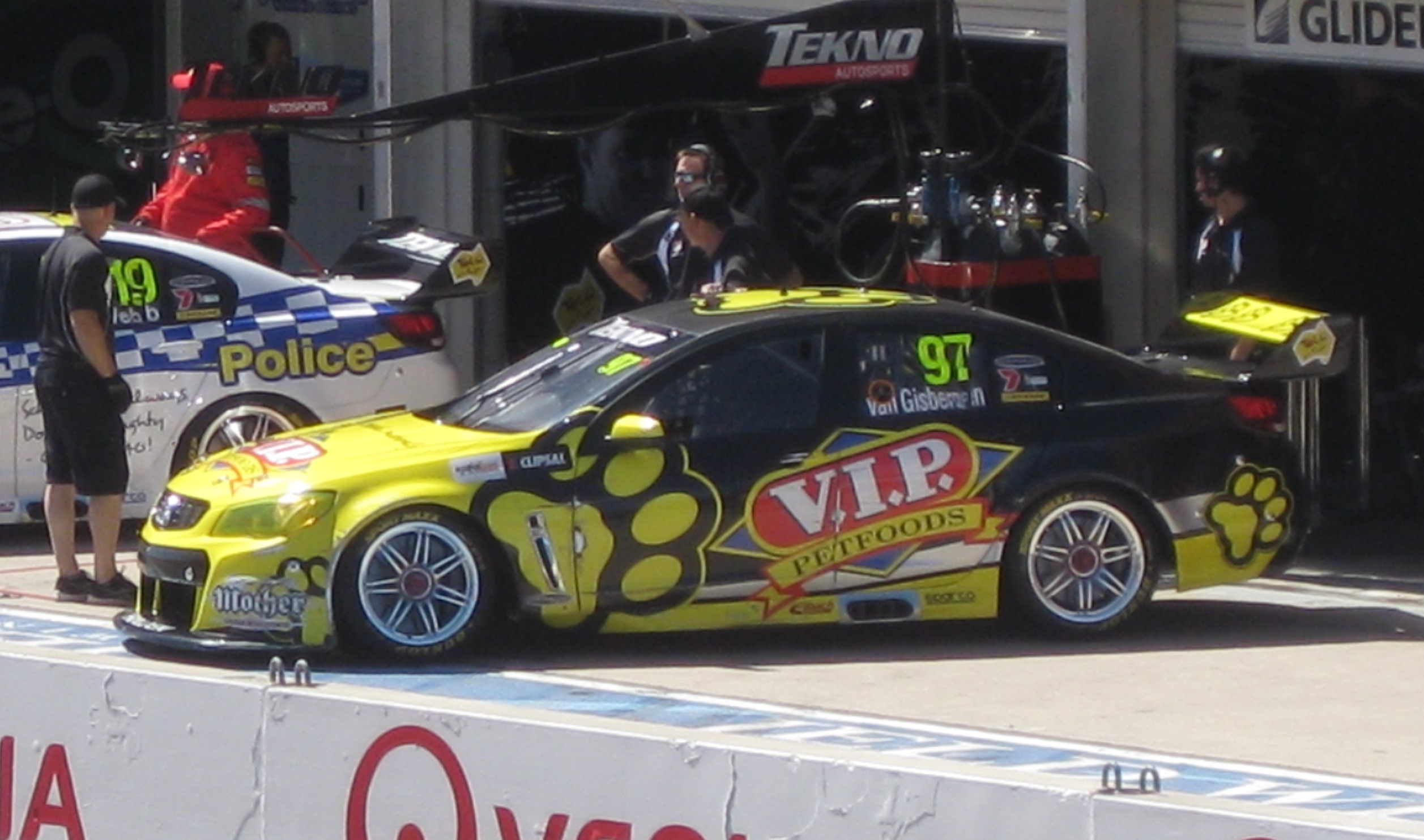
The Holden VF Commodore of Shane van Gisbergen at the 2013 Clipsal 500 Adelaide.

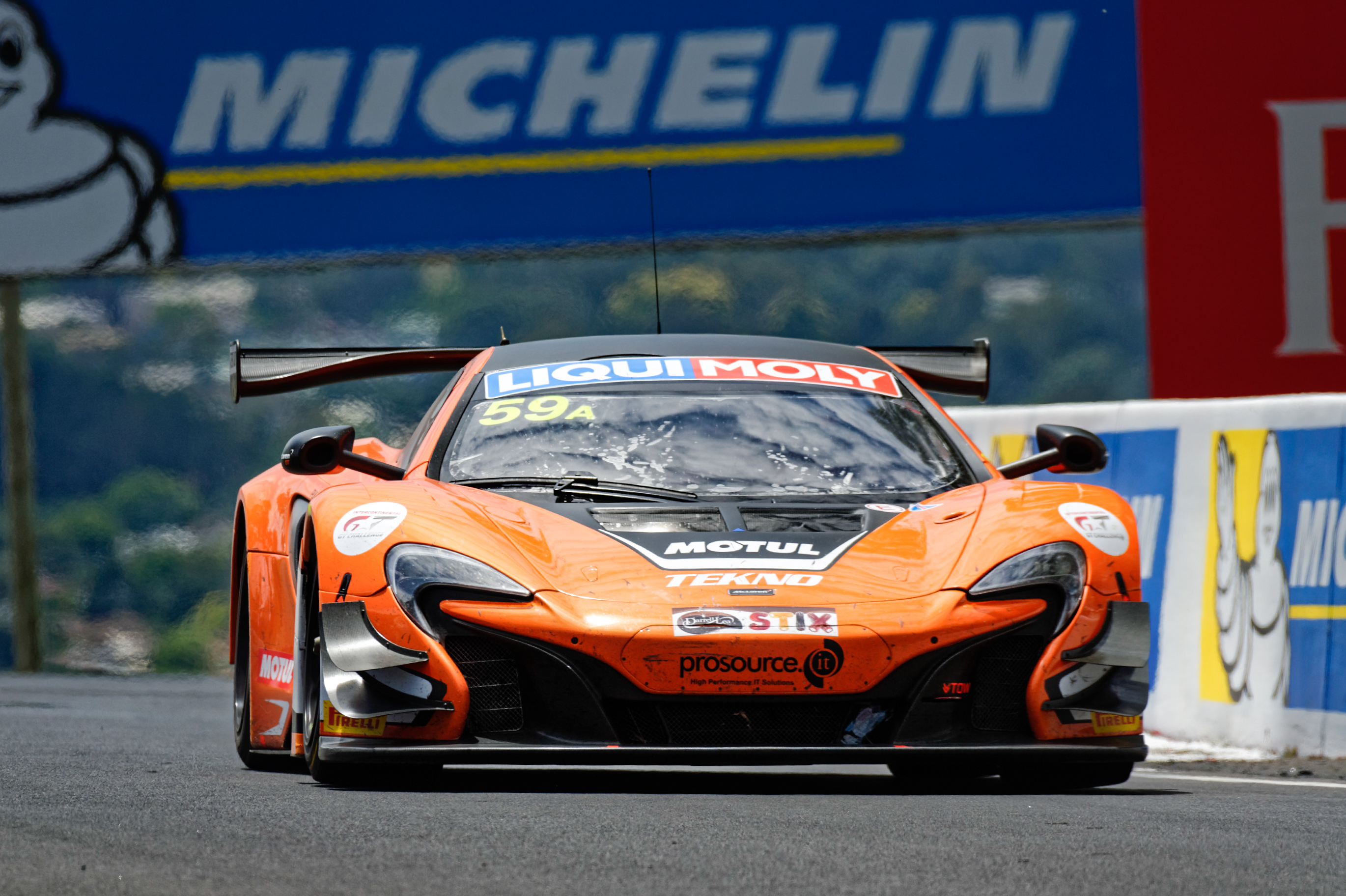
The McLaren 650S GT3 of Álvaro Parente, Shane van Gisbergen and Jonathon Webb which won the 2016 Liqui Moly Bathurst 12 Hour.

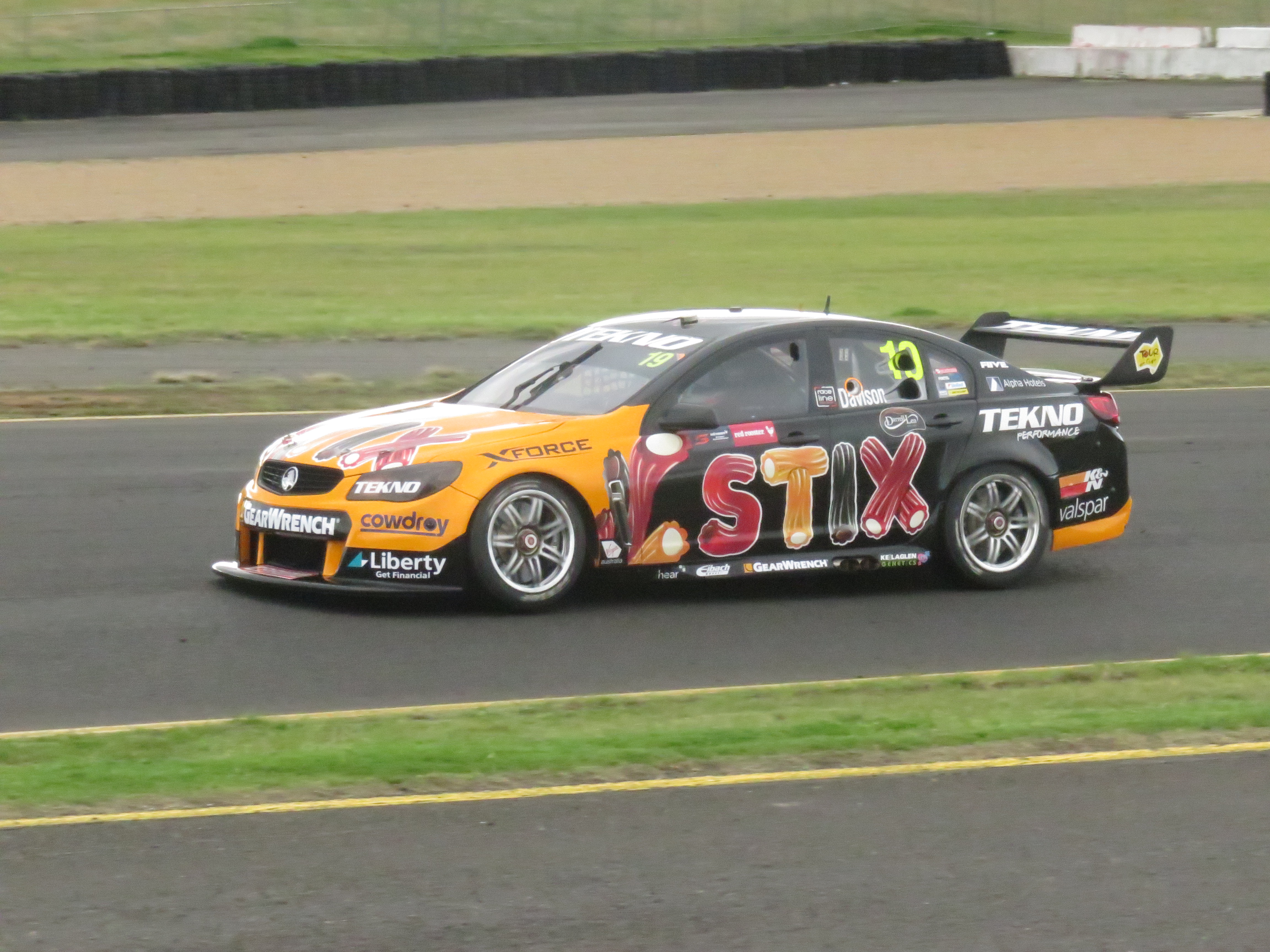
The Holden VF Commodore of Will Davison at the 2016 Red Rooster Sydney SuperSprint
