= 2013 Clipsal 500 Adelaide =

Motor race

(South Australia) 2013 Clipsal 500 Adelaide
Event Information
- Round 1 of 14 in the 2013 International V8 Supercars Championship
- Date: 28 February–3 March 2013
- Location: Adelaide, South Australia
- Venue: Adelaide Street Circuit
- Weather: Fine

Results
Race 1
Distance	78 laps	250 km
Pole position	Shane van Gisbergen; Tekno Autosports	1:21.3595
Winner	Craig Lowndes; Triple Eight Race Engineering	1:49:37.3127
Race 2
Distance	78 laps	250 km
Pole position	Shane van Gisbergen; Tekno Autosports	1:20.7148
Winner	Shane van Gisbergen; Tekno Autosports	1:51:52.4116

The 2013 Clipsal 500 Adelaide was a motor race for V8 Supercars held on 2 and 3 March 2013. The event was held at the Adelaide Street Circuit in Adelaide, South Australia, and consisted of two races of two hundred and fifty kilometres in length. It was the first round of the 2013 International V8 Supercars Championship, and marked the racing debuts of the Holden VF Commodore, Mercedes-Benz E63 AMG, and Nissan Altima L33, all of which were entered in the series under the brand-new "Car of the Future" regulations; Ford continued to use the FG Falcon model raced in previous years, but built to Car of the Future specifications.

== Report ==
=== Race 1 ===
==== Qualifying ====
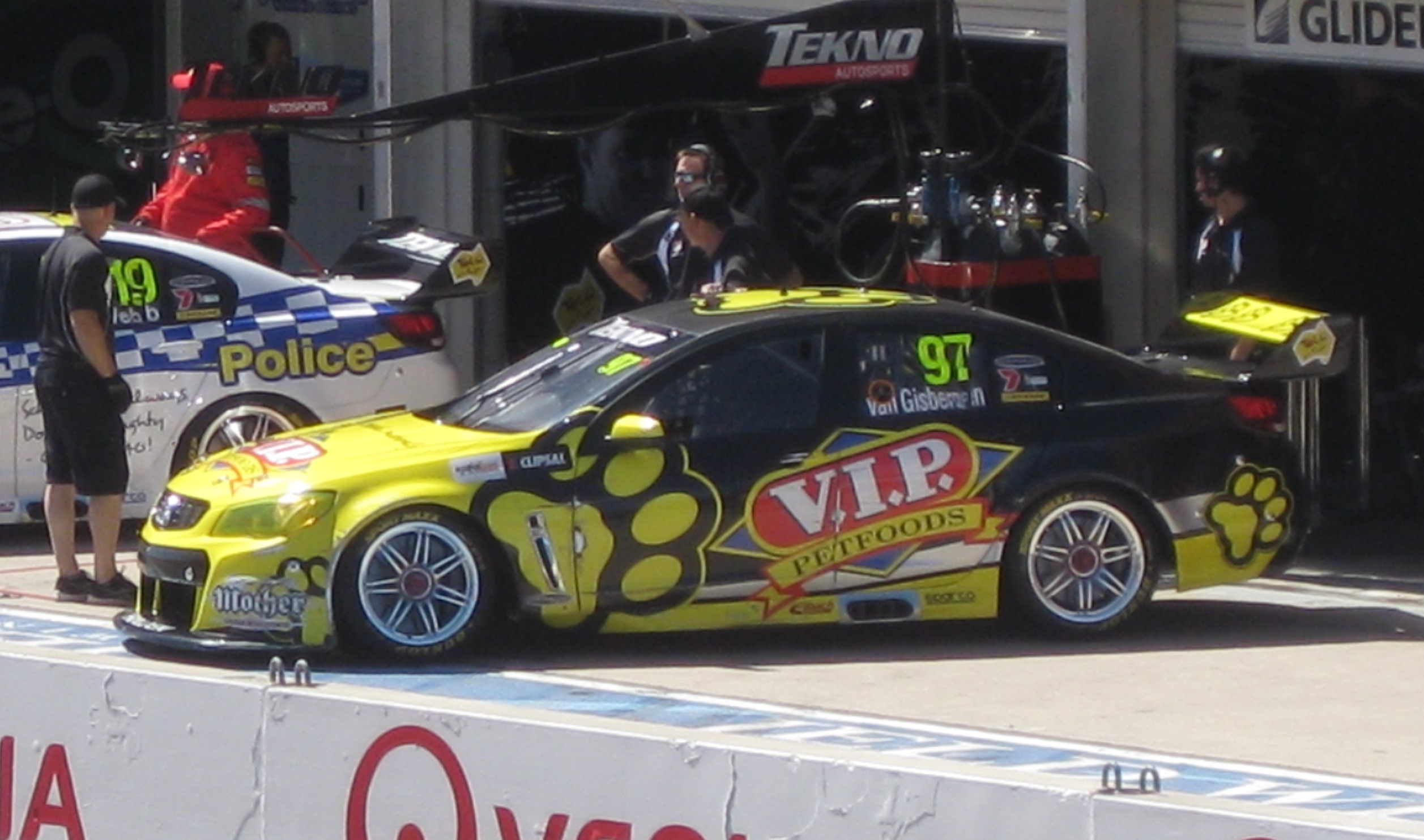
The Holden VF Commodore of Shane van Gisbergen at the 2013 Clipsal 500 Adelaide

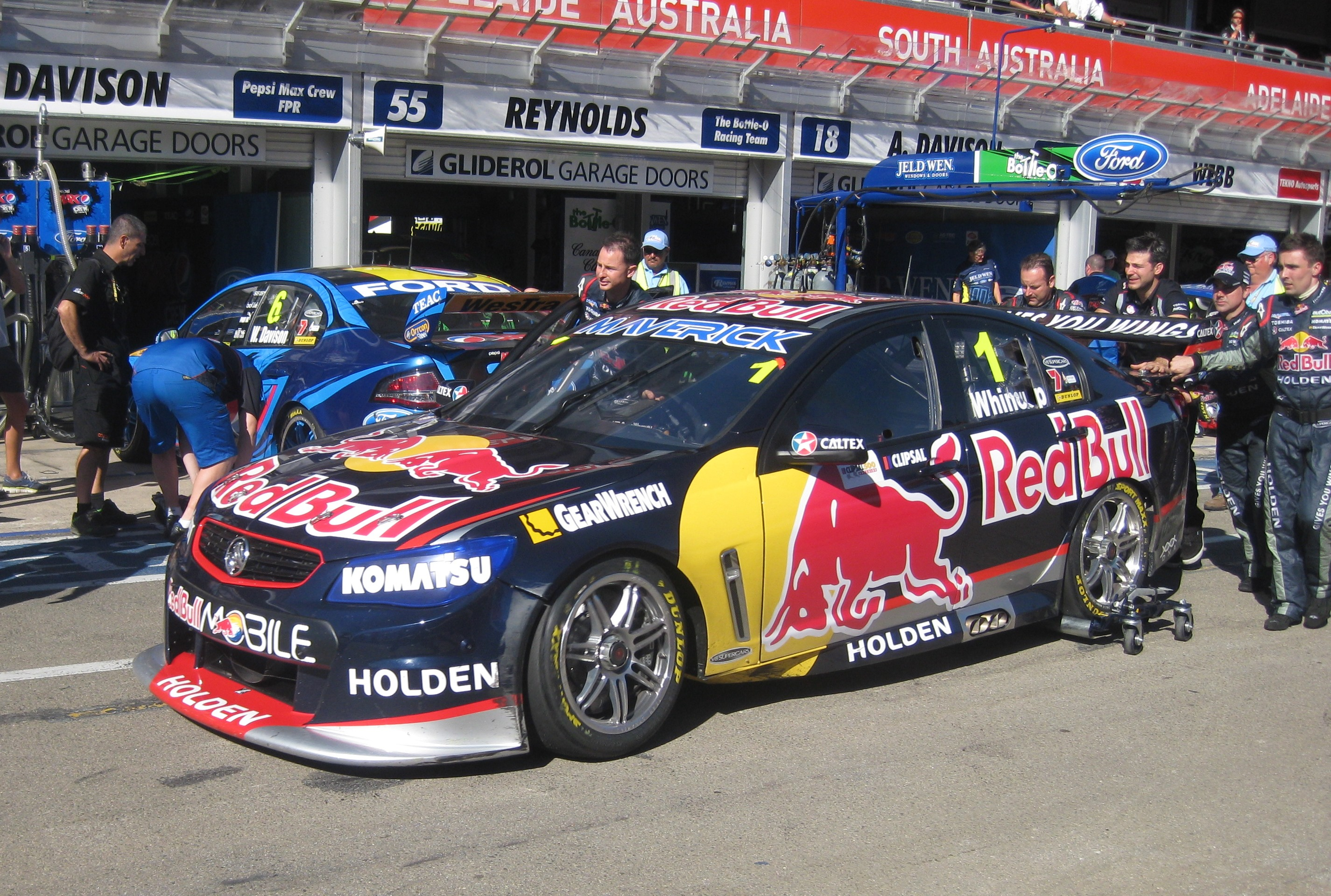
The Holden VF Commodore of Jamie Whincup at the 2013 Clipsal 500 Adelaide

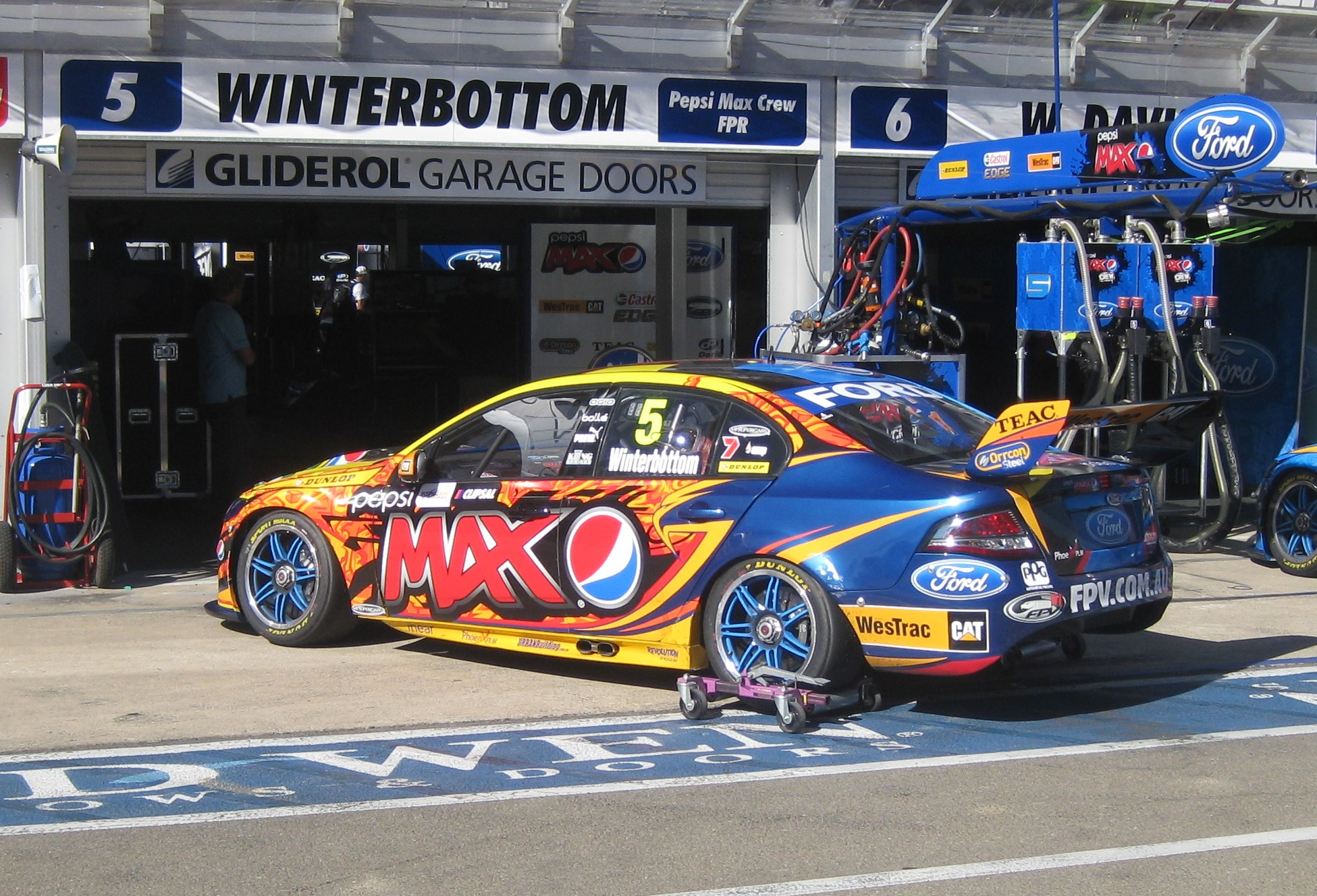
The Ford FG Falcon of Mark Winterbottom at the 2013 Clipsal 500 Adelaide

Pos.	No.	Name	Car	Team	Time
1	888	(Australia) Craig Lowndes	Holden VF Commodore	Triple Eight Race Engineering	1:20.8731^{1}
2	97	(New Zealand) Shane van Gisbergen	Holden VF Commodore	Tekno Autosports	1:20.8731^{1}
3	1	(Australia) Jamie Whincup	Holden VF Commodore	Triple Eight Race Engineering	1:20.8892
4	6	(Australia) Will Davison	Ford FG Falcon	Ford Performance Racing	1:21.0594
5	14	(New Zealand) Fabian Coulthard	Holden VF Commodore	Brad Jones Racing	1:21.1496
6	33	(New Zealand) Scott McLaughlin	Holden VF Commodore	Garry Rogers Motorsport	1:21.1865
7	34	(France) Alexandre Prémat	Holden VF Commodore	Garry Rogers Motorsport	1:21.2323
8	5	(Australia) Mark Winterbottom	Ford FG Falcon	Ford Performance Racing	1:21.2653
9	19	(Australia) Jonathon Webb	Holden VF Commodore	Tekno Autosports	1:21.3006
10	22	(Australia) James Courtney	Holden VF Commodore	Holden Racing Team	1:21.3136
11	80	(Australia) Scott Pye	Holden VF Commodore	Lucas Dumbrell Motorsport	1:21.5084
12	66	(Australia) Russell Ingall	Holden VF Commodore	Walkinshaw Racing	1:21.6164
13	36	(Australia) Michael Caruso	Nissan Altima L33	Nissan Motorsport	1:21.6701
14	360	(Australia) James Moffat	Nissan Altima L33	Nissan Motorsport	1:21.6903
15	88	(Australia) Dean Fiore	Holden VF Commodore	Lucas Dumbrell Motorsport	1:21.6930
16	18	(Australia) Alex Davison	Ford FG Falcon	Charlie Schwerkolt Racing	1:21.7393
17	7	(Australia) Todd Kelly	Nissan Altima L33	Nissan Motorsport	1:21.7477
18	2	(Australia) Garth Tander	Holden VF Commodore	Holden Racing Team	1:21.7832
19	15	(Australia) Rick Kelly	Nissan Altima L33	Nissan Motorsport	1:21.8651
20	8	(Australia) Jason Bright	Holden VF Commodore	Brad Jones Racing	1:21.8754
21	55	(Australia) David Reynolds	Ford FG Falcon	Rod Nash Racing	1:21.9048
22	3	(Australia) Tony D'Alberto	Holden VF Commodore	Tony D'Alberto Racing	1:21.9709
23	4	(Australia) Lee Holdsworth	Mercedes-Benz E63 AMG	Erebus Motorsport	1:22.1206
24	47	(Australia) Tim Slade	Mercedes-Benz E63 AMG	James Rosenberg Racing	1:22.2518
25	17	(Australia) Tim Blanchard	Ford FG Falcon	Dick Johnson Racing	1:22.2749
26	21	(Australia) David Wall	Holden VF Commodore	Britek Motorsport	1:22.2837
27	12	(New Zealand) Jonny Reid	Ford FG Falcon	Dick Johnson Racing	1:22.8720
28	9	(Germany) Maro Engel	Mercedes-Benz E63 AMG	Erebus Motorsport	1:23.2133

Notes:

- ^1 — Craig Lowndes and Shane van Gisbergen both set lap times that were identical to the ten-thousandth of a second. As Lowndes had set his laptime before Van Gisbergen, he was awarded provisional pole.

==== Top 10 Shootout ====
FPos.	No.	Name	Car	Team	QPos.	Time
1	97	(New Zealand) Shane van Gisbergen	Holden VF Commodore	Tekno Autosports	2	1:21.3595
2	5	(Australia) Mark Winterbottom	Ford FG Falcon	Ford Performance Racing	8	1:21.4075
3	888	(Australia) Craig Lowndes	Holden VF Commodore	Triple Eight Race Engineering	1	1:21.4453
4	14	(New Zealand) Fabian Coulthard	Holden VF Commodore	Brad Jones Racing	5	1:21.4852
5	1	(Australia) Jamie Whincup	Holden VF Commodore	Triple Eight Race Engineering	3	1:21.5258
6	19	(Australia) Jonathon Webb	Holden VF Commodore	Tekno Autosports	9	1:21.5916
7	6	(Australia) Will Davison	Ford FG Falcon	Ford Performance Racing	4	1:21.6558
8	34	(France) Alexandre Prémat	Holden VF Commodore	Garry Rogers Motorsport	7	1:21.7859
9	22	(Australia) James Courtney	Holden VF Commodore	Holden Racing Team	10	1:22.1825
10	33	(New Zealand) Scott McLaughlin	Holden VF Commodore	Garry Rogers Motorsport	6	1:22.2235

==== Race ====
Pos.	No.	Name	Car	Team	Grid	Time	Points
1	888	(Australia) Craig Lowndes	Holden VF Commodore	Triple Eight Race Engineering	3	1:49:37.3127	150
2	6	(Australia) Will Davison	Ford FG Falcon	Ford Performance Racing	7	+20.5203	138
3	1	(Australia) Jamie Whincup	Holden VF Commodore	Triple Eight Race Engineering	5	+32.1287	129
4	34	(France) Alexandre Prémat	Holden VF Commodore	Garry Rogers Motorsport	8	+35.5821	120
5	22	(Australia) James Courtney	Holden VF Commodore	Holden Racing Team	9	+37.3925	111
6	33	(New Zealand) Scott McLaughlin	Holden VF Commodore	Garry Rogers Motorsport	10	+38.6829	102
7	2	(Australia) Garth Tander	Holden VF Commodore	Holden Racing Team	18	+39.0363	96
8	19	(Australia) Jonathon Webb	Holden VF Commodore	Tekno Autosports	6	+48.4746	90
9	18	(Australia) Alex Davison	Ford FG Falcon	Charlie Schwerkolt Racing	16	+49.2109	84
10	66	(Australia) Russell Ingall	Holden VF Commodore	Walkinshaw Racing	12	+66.0578	78
11	15	(Australia) Rick Kelly	Nissan Altima L33	Nissan Motorsport	19	+68.5664	72
12	3	(Australia) Tony D'Alberto	Holden VF Commodore	Tony D'Alberto Racing	22	+71.4827	69
13	80	(Australia) Scott Pye	Holden VF Commodore	Lucas Dumbrell Motorsport	11	+73.2353	66
14	360	(Australia) James Moffat	Nissan Altima L33	Nissan Motorsport	14	+1 lap	63
15	47	(Australia) Tim Slade	Mercedes-Benz E63 AMG	James Rosenberg Racing	24	+1 lap	60
16	21	(Australia) David Wall	Holden VF Commodore	Britek Motorsport	26	+1 lap	57
17	4	(Australia) Lee Holdsworth	Mercedes-Benz E63 AMG	Erebus Motorsport	23	+1 lap	54
18	17	(Australia) Tim Blanchard	Ford FG Falcon	Dick Johnson Racing	25	+2 laps	51
19	14	(New Zealand) Fabian Coulthard	Holden VF Commodore	Brad Jones Racing	4	+3 laps	48
20	55	(Australia) David Reynolds	Ford FG Falcon	Rod Nash Racing	21	+6 laps	45
21	88	(Australia) Dean Fiore	Holden VF Commodore	Lucas Dumbrell Motorsport	15	+7 laps	42
22	8	(Australia) Jason Bright	Holden VF Commodore	Brad Jones Racing	20	+11 laps	39
23	36	(Australia) Michael Caruso	Nissan Altima L33	Nissan Motorsport	13	+14 laps	36
24	9	(Germany) Maro Engel	Mercedes-Benz E63 AMG	Erebus Motorsport	28	+19 laps	33
Ret	97	(New Zealand) Shane van Gisbergen	Holden VF Commodore	Tekno Autosports	1	Retired	
Ret	12	(New Zealand) Jonny Reid	Ford FG Falcon	Dick Johnson Racing	27	Retired	
Ret	7	(Australia) Todd Kelly	Nissan Altima L33	Nissan Motorsport	17	Retired	
Ret	5	(Australia) Mark Winterbottom	Ford FG Falcon	Ford Performance Racing	2	Retired	

=== Race 2 ===
==== Qualifying ====
Pos.	No.	Name	Car	Team	Time
1	97	(New Zealand) Shane van Gisbergen	Holden VF Commodore	Tekno Autosports	1:20.7148
2	5	(Australia) Mark Winterbottom	Ford FG Falcon	Ford Performance Racing	1:20.8233
3	1	(Australia) Jamie Whincup	Holden VF Commodore	Triple Eight Race Engineering	1:20.8553
4	6	(Australia) Will Davison	Ford FG Falcon	Ford Performance Racing	1:20.9329
5	14	(New Zealand) Fabian Coulthard	Holden VF Commodore	Brad Jones Racing	1:20.9338
6	34	(France) Alexandre Prémat	Holden VF Commodore	Garry Rogers Motorsport	1:21.1051
7	33	(New Zealand) Scott McLaughlin	Holden VF Commodore	Garry Rogers Motorsport	1:21.1071
8	888	(Australia) Craig Lowndes	Holden VF Commodore	Triple Eight Race Engineering	1:21.1406
9	66	(Australia) Russell Ingall	Holden VF Commodore	Walkinshaw Racing	1:21.1900
10	22	(Australia) James Courtney	Holden VF Commodore	Holden Racing Team	1:21.3450
11	3	(Australia) Tony D'Alberto	Holden VF Commodore	Tony D'Alberto Racing	1:21.4110
12	18	(Australia) Alex Davison	Ford FG Falcon	Charlie Schwerkolt Racing	1:21.4325
13	55	(Australia) David Reynolds	Ford FG Falcon	Rod Nash Racing	1:21.4386
14	2	(Australia) Garth Tander	Holden VF Commodore	Holden Racing Team	1:21.4568
15	80	(Australia) Scott Pye	Holden VF Commodore	Lucas Dumbrell Motorsport	1:21.5321
16	15	(Australia) Rick Kelly	Nissan Altima L33	Nissan Motorsport	1:21.5378
17	88	(Australia) Dean Fiore	Holden VF Commodore	Lucas Dumbrell Motorsport	1:21.5578
18	8	(Australia) Jason Bright	Holden VF Commodore	Brad Jones Racing	1:21.5747
19	360	(Australia) James Moffat	Nissan Altima L33	Nissan Motorsport	1:21.7091
20	19	(Australia) Jonathon Webb	Holden VF Commodore	Tekno Autosports	1:21.7143
21	17	(Australia) Tim Blanchard	Ford FG Falcon	Dick Johnson Racing	1:21.9685
22	21	(Australia) David Wall	Holden VF Commodore	Britek Motorsport	1:22.1783
23	36	(Australia) Michael Caruso	Nissan Altima L33	Nissan Motorsport	1:22.2016
24	7	(Australia) Todd Kelly	Nissan Altima L33	Nissan Motorsport	1:22.2814
25	47	(Australia) Tim Slade	Mercedes-Benz E63 AMG	James Rosenberg Racing	1:22.3014
26	12	(New Zealand) Jonny Reid	Ford FG Falcon	Dick Johnson Racing	1:22.3925
27	4	(Australia) Lee Holdsworth	Mercedes-Benz E63 AMG	Erebus Motorsport	1:22.3968
28	9	(Germany) Maro Engel	Mercedes-Benz E63 AMG	Erebus Motorsport	1:23.3731

==== Race ====
Pos.	No.	Name	Car	Team	Grid	Time	Points
1	97	(New Zealand) Shane van Gisbergen	Holden VF Commodore	Tekno Autosports	1	1:51:52.4116	150
2	1	(Australia) Jamie Whincup	Holden VF Commodore	Triple Eight Race Engineering	3	+2.2193	138
3	888	(Australia) Craig Lowndes	Holden VF Commodore	Triple Eight Race Engineering	8	+3.8293	129
4	66	(Australia) Russell Ingall	Holden VF Commodore	Walkinshaw Racing	9	+7.0731	120
5	5	(Australia) Mark Winterbottom	Ford FG Falcon	Ford Performance Racing	2	+7.3886	111
6	6	(Australia) Will Davison	Ford FG Falcon	Ford Performance Racing	4	+7.9701	102
7	22	(Australia) James Courtney	Holden VF Commodore	Holden Racing Team	10	+8.9026	96
8	3	(Australia) Tony D'Alberto	Holden VF Commodore	Tony D'Alberto Racing	11	+12.5191	90
9	33	(New Zealand) Scott McLaughlin	Holden VF Commodore	Garry Rogers Motorsport	7	+14.3227	84
10	19	(Australia) Jonathon Webb	Holden VF Commodore	Tekno Autosports	20	+14.6458	78
11	80	(Australia) Scott Pye	Holden VF Commodore	Lucas Dumbrell Motorsport	15	+18.0410	72
12	88	(Australia) Dean Fiore	Holden VF Commodore	Lucas Dumbrell Motorsport	17	+18.8045	69
13	360	(Australia) James Moffat	Nissan Altima L33	Nissan Motorsport	19	+19.9581	66
14	15	(Australia) Rick Kelly	Nissan Altima L33	Nissan Motorsport	16	+53.4477	63
15	17	(Australia) Tim Blanchard	Ford FG Falcon	Dick Johnson Racing	21	+1 lap	60
16	21	(Australia) David Wall	Holden VF Commodore	Britek Motorsport	22	+1 lap	57
17	4	(Australia) Lee Holdsworth	Mercedes-Benz E63 AMG	Erebus Motorsport	27	+1 lap	54
Ret	8	(Australia) Jason Bright	Holden VF Commodore	Brad Jones Racing	18	Retired	
Ret	2	(Australia) Garth Tander	Holden VF Commodore	Holden Racing Team	14	Retired	
Ret	7	(Australia) Todd Kelly	Nissan Altima L33	Nissan Motorsport	24	Retired	
Ret	18	(Australia) Alex Davison	Ford FG Falcon	Charlie Schwerkolt Racing	12	Retired	
Ret	12	(New Zealand) Jonny Reid	Ford FG Falcon	Dick Johnson Racing	26	Retired	
Ret	47	(Australia) Tim Slade	Mercedes-Benz E63 AMG	James Rosenberg Racing	25	Retired	
Ret	36	(Australia) Michael Caruso	Nissan Altima L33	Nissan Motorsport	23	Retired	
Ret	9	(Germany) Maro Engel	Mercedes-Benz E63 AMG	Erebus Motorsport	28	Retired	
Ret	14	(New Zealand) Fabian Coulthard	Holden VF Commodore	Brad Jones Racing	5	Retired	
Ret	55	(Australia) David Reynolds	Ford FG Falcon	Rod Nash Racing	13	Retired	
Ret	34	(France) Alexandre Prémat	Holden VF Commodore	Garry Rogers Motorsport	6	Retired	

== Championship standings after the race ==
Drivers' Championship standings

Pos.	Driver	Points
1	Craig Lowndes	279
2	Jamie Whincup	267
3	Will Davison	240
4	Russell Ingall	198
5	James Courtney	192

Teams' Championship standings

Pos.	Constructor	Points
1	Triple Eight Race Engineering	546
2	Ford Performance Racing	351
3	Tekno Autosports	318
4	Garry Rogers Motorsport	306
5	Holden Racing Team	303

- Note: Only the top five positions are included for both sets of standings.
