= 2012 Coates Hire Ipswich 300 =

2012 V8 Supercar championship race

(Queensland) 2012 Coates Hire Ipswich 300
Event Information
- Round 8 of 15 in the 2012 International V8 Supercars Championship
- Date: 3–5 August 2012
- Location: Ipswich, Queensland
- Venue: Queensland Raceway
- Weather: Fine

Results
Race 1
Distance	45 laps	140 km
Pole position	Craig Lowndes; Triple Eight Race Engineering	1:09:2218
Winner	Craig Lowndes; Triple Eight Race Engineering	54:57:5057
Race 2
Distance	65 laps	200 km
Pole position	Will Davison; Ford Performance Racing	1:09:4828
Winner	Craig Lowndes; Triple Eight Race Engineering	1:18:23:0855

The 2012 Coates Hire Ipswich 300 was a motor race for the Australian sedan-based V8 Supercars. It was the eighth event of the 2012 International V8 Supercars Championship. It was held on the weekend of 3–5 August at Queensland Raceway, in Ipswich, Queensland.

Craig Lowndes clean-swept the event, leading to five-straight victories at this circuit and this event. The results of the two races were remarkable similar with Lowndes, Mark Winterbottom and Jamie Whincup completing the podium in order in both races. Fabian Coulthard, Will Davison and Russell Ingall shared fourth to sixth in different orders. Shane van Gisbergen was seventh in both races while Michael Caruso and Tim Slade shared eight and ninth. With Lowndes winning and Winterbottom finishing ahead of Whincup the top four positions in the championship chase tightened will pulling further away from the rest of the field.

Canadian Formula One world champion Jacques Villeneuve again performed a fill-in role, substituting for Greg Murphy for the second time while Murphy recovered from back surgery.

== Report ==
=== Race 16 ===
==== Race ====
Pos.	No.	Name	Car	Team	Laps	Time/Retired	Grid	Points
1	888	(Australia) Craig Lowndes	Holden VE Commodore	Triple Eight Race Engineering	45	54:57.5057	1	150
2	5	(Australia) Mark Winterbottom	Ford FG Falcon	Ford Performance Racing	45	+ 1.7 s	3	138
3	1	(Australia) Jamie Whincup	Holden VE Commodore	Triple Eight Race Engineering	45	+ 9.4 s	2	129
4	14	(New Zealand) Fabian Coulthard	Holden VE Commodore	Brad Jones Racing	45	+ 11.8 s	5	120
5	66	(Australia) Russell Ingall	Holden VE Commodore	Walkinshaw Racing	45	+ 16.7 s	8	111
6	6	(Australia) Will Davison	Ford FG Falcon	Ford Performance Racing	45	+ 17.3 s	4	102
7	9	(New Zealand) Shane van Gisbergen	Ford FG Falcon	Stone Brothers Racing	45	+ 28.2 s	6	96
8	34	(Australia) Michael Caruso	Holden VE Commodore	Garry Rogers Motorsport	45	+ 33.3 s	9	90
9	47	(Australia) Tim Slade	Ford FG Falcon	Stone Brothers Racing	45	+ 37.6 s	15	84
10	17	(Australia) Steven Johnson	Ford FG Falcon	Dick Johnson Racing	45	+ 37.6 s	16	78
11	12	(Australia) Dean Fiore	Ford FG Falcon	Triple F Racing	45	+ 38.8 s	11	72
12	15	(Australia) Rick Kelly	Holden VE Commodore	Jack Daniel's Racing	45	+ 39.2 s	17	69
13	7	(Australia) Todd Kelly	Holden VE Commodore	Jack Daniel's Racing	45	+ 43.2 s	24	66
14	11	(Australia) Karl Reindler	Holden VE Commodore	Kelly Racing	45	+ 43.6 s	26	63
15	22	(Australia) James Courtney	Holden VE Commodore	Holden Racing Team	45	+ 45.5 s	21	60
16	49	(Australia) Steve Owen	Ford FG Falcon	Paul Morris Motorsport	45	+ 47.5 s	20	57
17	91	(Australia) Michael Patrizi	Holden VE Commodore	Tekno Autosports	45	+ 53.9 s	23	54
18	18	(Australia) James Moffat	Ford FG Falcon	Dick Johnson Racing	45	+ 56.1 s	13	51
19	33	(France) Alexandre Prémat	Holden VE Commodore	Garry Rogers Motorsport	45	+ 57.8 s	19	48
20	8	(Australia) Jason Bright	Holden VE Commodore	Brad Jones Racing	45	+ 58.6 s	14	45
21	21	(Australia) David Wall	Holden VE Commodore	Britek Motorsport	45	+ 59.7 s	28	42
22	55	(Australia) David Reynolds	Ford FG Falcon	Rod Nash Racing	45	+ 1:04.5	7	39
23	30	(Australia) Taz Douglas	Holden VE Commodore	Lucas Dumbrell Motorsport	44	+ 1 lap	25	36
24	51	(Canada) Jacques Villeneuve	Holden VE Commodore	Kelly Racing	44	+ 1 lap	26	
25	3	(Australia) Tony D'Alberto	Ford FG Falcon	Tony D'Alberto Racing	44	+ 1 lap	12	30
26	4	(Australia) Lee Holdsworth	Ford FG Falcon	Stone Brothers Racing	44	+ 1 lap	10	27
27	2	(Australia) Garth Tander	Holden VE Commodore	Holden Racing Team	40	+ 5 laps	18	24
Ret	19	(Australia) Jonathon Webb	Holden VE Commodore	Tekno Autosports	35	Mechanical	22	

=== Race 17 ===
==== Race ====
Pos.	No.	Name	Car	Team	Laps	Time/Retired	Grid	Points
1	888	(Australia) Craig Lowndes	Holden VE Commodore	Triple Eight Race Engineering	65	1:18:23.0855	4	150
2	5	(Australia) Mark Winterbottom	Ford FG Falcon	Ford Performance Racing	65	+ 2.0 s	2	138
3	1	(Australia) Jamie Whincup	Holden VE Commodore	Triple Eight Race Engineering	65	+ 16.1 s	3	129
4	6	(Australia) Will Davison	Ford FG Falcon	Ford Performance Racing	65	+ 23.7 s	1	120
5	14	(New Zealand) Fabian Coulthard	Holden VE Commodore	Brad Jones Racing	65	+ 32.5 s	7	111
6	66	(Australia) Russell Ingall	Holden VE Commodore	Walkinshaw Racing	65	+ 33.3 s	5	102
7	9	(New Zealand) Shane van Gisbergen	Ford FG Falcon	Stone Brothers Racing	65	+ 34.7 s	8	96
8	47	(Australia) Tim Slade	Ford FG Falcon	Stone Brothers Racing	65	+ 36.1 s	11	90
9	34	(Australia) Michael Caruso	Holden VE Commodore	Garry Rogers Motorsport	65	+ 41.5 s	9	84
10	49	(Australia) Steve Owen	Ford FG Falcon	Paul Morris Motorsport	65	+ 55.2 s	15	78
11	17	(Australia) Steven Johnson	Ford FG Falcon	Dick Johnson Racing	65	+ 57.3 s	14	72
12	91	(Australia) Michael Patrizi	Holden VE Commodore	Tekno Autosports	65	+ 57.7 s	22	69
13	3	(Australia) Tony D'Alberto	Ford FG Falcon	Tony D'Alberto Racing	65	+ 1:06.2	10	66
14	22	(Australia) James Courtney	Holden VE Commodore	Holden Racing Team	65	+ 1:07.8	18	63
15	2	(Australia) Garth Tander	Holden VE Commodore	Holden Racing Team	64	+ 1 lap	24	60
16	7	(Australia) Todd Kelly	Holden VE Commodore	Jack Daniel's Racing	64	+ 1 lap	16	57
17	8	(Australia) Jason Bright	Holden VE Commodore	Brad Jones Racing	64	+ 1 lap	17	54
18	21	(Australia) David Wall	Holden VE Commodore	Britek Motorsport	64	+ 1 lap	27	51
19	18	(Australia) James Moffat	Ford FG Falcon	Dick Johnson Racing	64	+ 1 lap	21	48
20	12	(Australia) Dean Fiore	Ford FG Falcon	Triple F Racing	64	+ 1 lap	12	45
21	11	(Australia) Karl Reindler	Holden VE Commodore	Kelly Racing	64	+ 1 lap	26	42
22	30	(Australia) Taz Douglas	Holden VE Commodore	Lucas Dumbrell Motorsport	64	+ 1 lap	25	39
23	33	(France) Alexandre Prémat	Holden VE Commodore	Garry Rogers Motorsport	64	+ 1 lap	20	36
24	51	(Canada) Jacques Villeneuve	Holden VE Commodore	Kelly Racing	64	+ 1 lap	28	
25	15	(Australia) Rick Kelly	Holden VE Commodore	Jack Daniel's Racing	64	+ 1 lap	23	30
26	55	(Australia) David Reynolds	Ford FG Falcon	Rod Nash Racing	62	+ 3 laps	13	27
Ret	4	(Australia) Lee Holdsworth	Ford FG Falcon	Stone Brothers Racing	55		19	
Ret	19	(Australia) Jonathon Webb	Holden VE Commodore	Tekno Autosports	54		6	

== Standings ==
- After 17 of 30 races.

Pos	No	Name	Team	Points
1	1	Jamie Whincup	Triple Eight Race Engineering	2052
2	5	Mark Winterbottom	Ford Performance Racing	1970
3	6	Will Davison	Ford Performance Racing	1876
4	888	Craig Lowndes	Triple Eight Race Engineering	1796
5	9	Shane van Gisbergen	Stone Brothers Racing	1472
