= 2018 Sandown 500 =

2018 V8 Supercar championship race

(Victoria (state)) 2018 Rabble.club Sandown 500
Event Information
- Round 12 of 16 in the 2018 Supercars Championship
- Date: 14–16 September 2018
- Location: Melbourne, Victoria
- Venue: Sandown Raceway
- Weather: Friday: Showers; Saturday: Showers; Sunday: Clearing

Results
Race 1
Distance	161 laps	505.254 km
Pole position	(Australia) Jamie Whincup (Australia) Paul Dumbrell; Triple Eight Race Engineering	1:07.8389
Winner	(Australia) Jamie Whincup (Australia) Paul Dumbrell; Triple Eight Race Engineering	3:17:28.6203

The 2018 Sandown 500 (known for sponsorship purposes as the 2018 Rabble.club Sandown 500) was a motor racing event for Supercars, held on the weekend of 14 to 16 September 2018. The event was held at Sandown Raceway in Melbourne, Victoria, Australia and consisted of one race, 500 kilometres in length. It was the twelfth event of sixteen in the 2018 Supercars Championship and hosted Race 24 of the series. It was also the first event of the 2018 Enduro Cup.

The race was won by Jamie Whincup and Paul Dumbrell driving a Holden Commodore ZB.

== Background ==
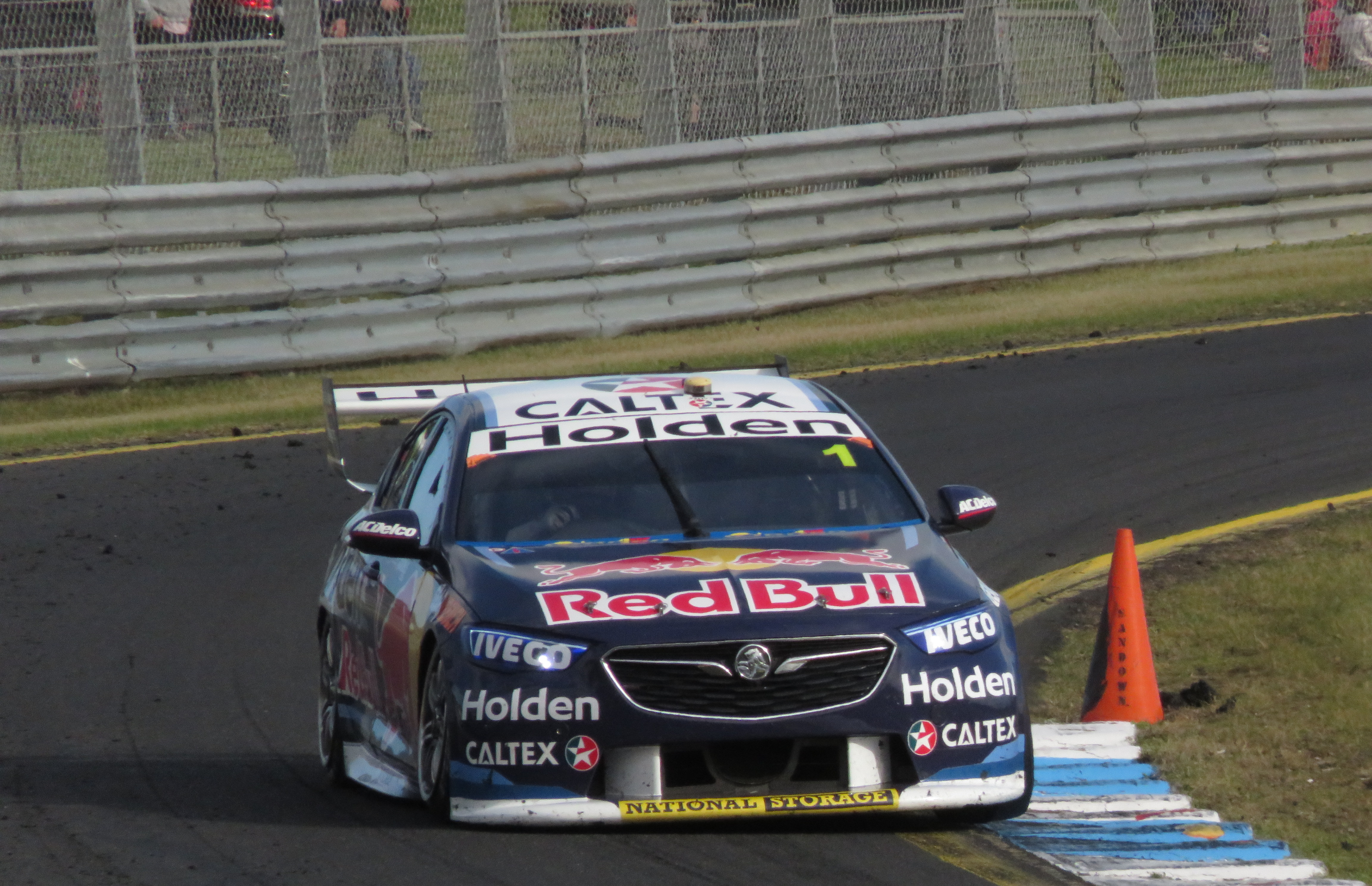
Jamie Whincup and Paul Dumbrell won the 2018 Sandown 500 for Triple Eight Race Engineering

The event was the 48th running of the Sandown 500, which was first held in 1964 as a six-hour race for series production touring cars. It was the fourteenth time the race had been held as part of the Supercars Championship and the sixth time it formed part of the Enduro Cup. The defending winners of the race were Cam Waters and Richie Stanaway.

The event was promoted as a "retro round", with teams encouraged to use adaptations of Australian touring car liveries from the 1960s, 1970s and 1980s, although some teams extended beyond these parameters when devising a livery.

The following cars carried a retro livery during the event:

Vehicle		Notes
Walkinshaw Andretti United	2	Holden Racing Team livery used by Garth Tander and Mark Skaife in the 2008 V8 Supercar Championship Series.
Walkinshaw Andretti United	25	Holden Racing Team livery used by Garth Tander and Mark Skaife in the 2008 V8 Supercar Championship Series.
Erebus Motorsport	9	Roadways Racing 'Chickadee' livery used by 1986 Bathurst 1000 winners, Allan Grice and Graeme Bailey.
Erebus Motorsport	99	'Chickadee Chicken' livery used by Graeme Bailey and Steve Land in the 1982 Sandown 400
DJR Team Penske	12	Dick Johnson Racing livery used by Dick Johnson and John Bowe in the 1988 Australian Touring Car Championship.
DJR Team Penske	17	Dick Johnson Racing livery used by Dick Johnson and John Bowe in the 1988 Australian Touring Car Championship.
Brad Jones Racing	14	Livery based on one used by Bob Jane in the 1970s on his Holden HQ Monaro GTS350 Sports Sedan.
Nissan Motorsport	15	Perkins Engineering livery used by Russell Ingall, Steven Richards and Larry Perkins in the 2002 V8 Supercar Championship Series.
Nissan Motorsport	78	Livery inspired by various 1960's Nissan Motorsport liveries.
Team 18	18	Wyong Motors Pty Ltd livery used by Bruce McPhee and Barry Mulholland in the 1968 Hardie-Ferodo 500.
Tim Blanchard Racing	21	Benson & Hedges Racing livery used by Blanchard's father, John in the 1993 Tooheys 1000.
Garry Rogers Motorsport	33	Bob Jane T-Marts livery used by Garry Rogers in the 1978 Hardie-Ferodo 1000.
Garry Rogers Motorsport	34	Soundwave Discos livery used by Garry Rogers in the 1983 James Hardie 1000.
Tickford Racing	55	Steven Ellery Racing livery used by Steven Ellery in the 2004 V8 Supercar Championship Series.
23Red Racing	230	Livery featured vintage cream look.

== Results ==
=== Practice ===
Practice summary
Session	Day	Fastest lap				
Session	Day	No.	Driver	Team	Car	Time
Practice 1	Friday	1	(Australia) Paul Dumbrell	Triple Eight Race Engineering	Holden Commodore ZB	1:07.8467
Practice 2	Friday	1	(Australia) Jamie Whincup	Triple Eight Race Engineering	Holden Commodore ZB	1:07.9688
Practice 3	Friday	99	(Australia) Will Brown	Erebus Motorsport	Holden Commodore ZB	1:08.6230
Practice 4	Saturday	15	(Australia) Rick Kelly	Nissan Motorsport	Nissan Altima L33	1:14.3447
Warm-Up	Sunday	1	(Australia) Jamie Whincup (Australia) Paul Dumbrell	Triple Eight Race Engineering	Holden Commodore ZB	1:08.4080

=== Qualifying ===
Pos.	No.	Driver	Team	Car	Time	Gap	Grid
1	1	(Australia) Jamie Whincup	Triple Eight Race Engineering	Holden Commodore ZB	1:07.8389		1
2	55	(Australia) Chaz Mostert	Tickford Racing	Ford Falcon FG X	1:08.1206	+0.2817	2
3	25	(Australia) James Courtney	Walkinshaw Andretti United	Holden Commodore ZB	1:08.1223	+0.2834	3
4	9	(Australia) David Reynolds	Erebus Motorsport	Holden Commodore ZB	1:08.2097	+0.3708	4
5	2	(Australia) Scott Pye	Walkinshaw Andretti United	Holden Commodore ZB	1:08.3580	+0.5191	5
6	7	(New Zealand) Andre Heimgartner	Nissan Motorsport	Nissan Altima L33	1:08.3610	+0.5221	9^{1}
7	99	(Australia) Anton de Pasquale	Erebus Motorsport	Holden Commodore ZB	1:08.3668	+0.5279	6
8	8	(Australia) Nick Percat	Brad Jones Racing	Holden Commodore ZB	1:08.3996	+0.5607	7
9	34	(Australia) James Golding	Garry Rogers Motorsport	Holden Commodore ZB	1:08.3998	+0.5609	8
10	97	(New Zealand) Shane van Gisbergen	Triple Eight Race Engineering	Holden Commodore ZB	1:08.4181	+0.5792	10
11	6	(Australia) Cam Waters	Tickford Racing	Ford Falcon FG X	1:08.4195	+0.5806	11
12	12	(New Zealand) Fabian Coulthard	DJR Team Penske	Ford Falcon FG X	1:08.4516	+0.6127	12
13	888	(Australia) Craig Lowndes	Triple Eight Race Engineering	Holden Commodore ZB	1:08.4601	+0.6212	13
14	17	(New Zealand) Scott McLaughlin	DJR Team Penske	Ford Falcon FG X	1:08.4731	+0.6342	14
15	5	(Australia) Mark Winterbottom	Tickford Racing	Ford Falcon FG X	1:08.4802	+0.6413	15
16	15	(Australia) Rick Kelly	Nissan Motorsport	Nissan Altima L33	1:08.5391	+0.7002	16
17	14	(Australia) Tim Slade	Brad Jones Racing	Holden Commodore ZB	1:08.6103	+0.7714	17
18	23	(Australia) Michael Caruso	Nissan Motorsport	Nissan Altima L33	1:08.6421	+0.8032	18
19	33	(Australia) Garth Tander	Garry Rogers Motorsport	Holden Commodore ZB	1:08.6457	+0.8068	19
20	230	(Australia) Will Davison	23Red Racing	Ford Falcon FG X	1:08.6907	+0.8518	20
21	18	(Australia) Lee Holdsworth	Team 18	Holden Commodore ZB	1:08.7279	+0.8890	21
22	19	(Australia) Jack Le Brocq	Tekno Autosports	Holden Commodore ZB	1:08.7972	+0.9583	22
23	21	(Australia) Tim Blanchard	Tim Blanchard Racing	Holden Commodore ZB	1:08.9461	+1.1072	23
24	78	(Switzerland) Simona de Silvestro	Nissan Motorsport	Nissan Altima L33	1:08.9753	+1.1364	24
25	35	(Australia) Todd Hazelwood	Matt Stone Racing	Holden Commodore VF	1:09.0383	+1.1994	25
26	56	(New Zealand) Richie Stanaway	Tickford Racing	Ford Falcon FG X	1:09.2527	+1.4138	26

Notes

- ^1– Andre Heimgartner received a 3-place grid penalty for impeding Scott Pye during Qualifying.

=== Race ===
Pos.	No.	Driver	Team	Car	Laps	Time/Retired	Grid	Points
1	1	(Australia) Jamie Whincup (Australia) Paul Dumbrell	Triple Eight Race Engineering	Holden Commodore ZB	161	3:17:28.6203	2	300
2	97	(New Zealand) Shane van Gisbergen (New Zealand) Earl Bamber	Triple Eight Race Engineering	Holden Commodore ZB	161	+6.831	11	276
3	888	(Australia) Craig Lowndes (New Zealand) Steven Richards	Triple Eight Race Engineering	Holden Commodore ZB	161	+8.257	10	258
4	17	(New Zealand) Scott McLaughlin (France) Alexandre Prémat	DJR Team Penske	Ford Falcon FG X	161	+25.177	3	240
5	9	(Australia) David Reynolds (Australia) Luke Youlden	Erebus Motorsport	Holden Commodore ZB	161	+25.750	1	222
6	2	(Australia) Scott Pye (Australia) Warren Luff	Walkinshaw Andretti United	Holden Commodore ZB	161	+34.222	19	204
7	12	(New Zealand) Fabian Coulthard (Australia) Tony D'Alberto	DJR Team Penske	Ford Falcon FG X	161	+38.734	4	192
8	15	(Australia) Rick Kelly (Australia) Garry Jacobson	Nissan Motorsport	Nissan Altima L33	161	+48.816	16	180
9	33	(Australia) Garth Tander (New Zealand) Chris Pither	Garry Rogers Motorsport	Holden Commodore ZB	161	+51.814	15	168
10	55	(Australia) Chaz Mostert (Australia) James Moffat	Tickford Racing	Ford Falcon FG X	161	+58.183	7	156
11	230	(Australia) Will Davison (Australia) Alex Davison	23Red Racing	Ford Falcon FG X	161	+58.270	12	144
12	99	(Australia) Anton de Pasquale (Australia) Will Brown	Erebus Motorsport	Holden Commodore ZB	160	+1 lap	9	138
13	6	(Australia) Cam Waters (Australia) David Russell	Tickford Racing	Ford Falcon FG X	160	+1 lap	13	132
14	7	(New Zealand) Andre Heimgartner (Australia) Aaren Russell	Nissan Motorsport	Nissan Altima L33	160	+1 lap	6	126
15	14	(Australia) Tim Slade (Australia) Ashley Walsh	Brad Jones Racing	Holden Commodore ZB	160	+1 lap	8	120
16	25	(Australia) James Courtney (Australia) Jack Perkins	Walkinshaw Andretti United	Holden Commodore ZB	160	+1 lap	26	114
17	5	(Australia) Mark Winterbottom (Australia) Dean Canto	Tickford Racing	Ford Falcon FG X	160	+1 lap	5	108
18	34	(Australia) James Golding (Australia) Richard Muscat	Garry Rogers Motorsport	Holden Commodore ZB	160	+1 lap	24	102
19	21	(Australia) Tim Blanchard (Australia) Dale Wood	Tim Blanchard Racing	Holden Commodore ZB	160	+1 lap	14	96
20	56	(New Zealand) Richie Stanaway (Australia) Steve Owen	Tickford Racing	Ford Falcon FG X	160	+1 lap	17	90
21	35	(Australia) Todd Hazelwood (Australia) Bryce Fullwood	Matt Stone Racing	Holden Commodore VF	160	+1 lap	23	84
22	19	(Australia) Jack Le Brocq (Australia) Jonathon Webb	Tekno Autosports	Holden Commodore ZB	156	+5 laps	20	78
23	18	(Australia) Lee Holdsworth (Australia) Jason Bright	Team 18	Holden Commodore ZB	145	+16 laps	21	72
24	8	(Australia) Nick Percat (Australia) Macauley Jones	Brad Jones Racing	Holden Commodore ZB	142	+19 laps	25	66
25	23	(Australia) Michael Caruso (Australia) Dean Fiore	Nissan Motorsport	Nissan Altima L33	134	+27 laps	18	60
NC	78	(Switzerland) Simona de Silvestro (Australia) Alex Rullo	Nissan Motorsport	Nissan Altima L33	129	Retirement	22	
Fastest lap: Jamie Whincup and Paul Dumbrell (Triple Eight Race Engineering) 1:09.1938 (on lap 66)

=== Championship standings after Race 24 ===
Drivers' Championship standings

Pos	Driver	Pts	Gap
1	(New Zealand) Shane van Gisbergen	3054	
2	(New Zealand) Scott McLaughlin	2999	-55
3	(Australia) Jamie Whincup	2716	-338
4	(Australia) Craig Lowndes	2487	-567
5	(Australia) David Reynolds	2435	-619

Teams Championship

	Pos	Team	Pts	Gap
	1	Triple Eight Race Engineering (1, 97)	5769	
	2	DJR Team Penske	5113	-656
1	3	Tickford Racing (5, 55)	3688	-2081
1	4	Erebus Motorsport	3685	-2084
2	5	Brad Jones Racing	3621	-2148

Enduro Cup

Pos	Drivers	Pts	Gap
1	(Australia) Jamie Whincup (Australia) Paul Dumbrell	300	
2	(New Zealand) Shane van Gisbergen (New Zealand) Earl Bamber	276	-24
3	(Australia) Craig Lowndes (New Zealand) Steven Richards	258	-42
4	(New Zealand) Scott McLaughlin (France) Alexandre Prémat	240	-60
5	(Australia) David Reynolds (Australia) Luke Youlden	222	-78

- Note: Only the top five positions are included for three sets of standings.
