= Ford Futura =

Australian-made car

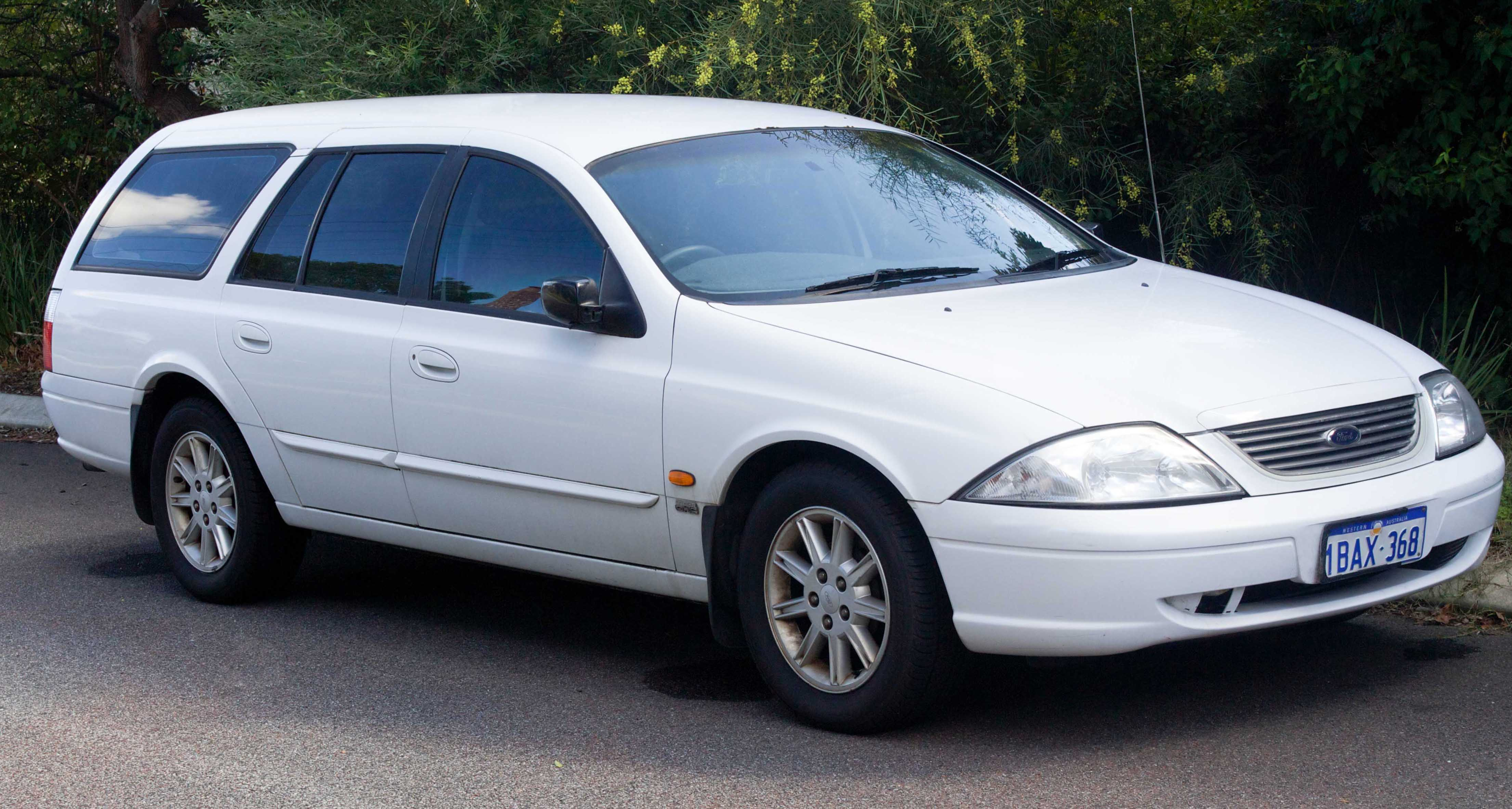
Ford Falcon Futura (AU II)

The Ford Futura is a large car that was made by Ford Australia between 1962 and 2008. Although the last Futura was part of the BF Series Ford Falcon range it was badged and marketed as the 'Ford Futura' rather than the 'Ford Falcon Futura'. Ford Australia first used the Futura name on the Ford Falcon Futura which was introduced in 1962 as the new luxury sedan in the Falcon XL Series range. The name was dropped from the XR Falcon range of 1966 and reintroduced in the XW range of 1969. It was discontinued again for the XC Series of 1976 and reappeared in the ED range of 1993. The name was used continuously by Ford Australia from that time until the replacement of the BF Series Ford Futura by the FG Series Ford G6 in 2008.

== US market ==
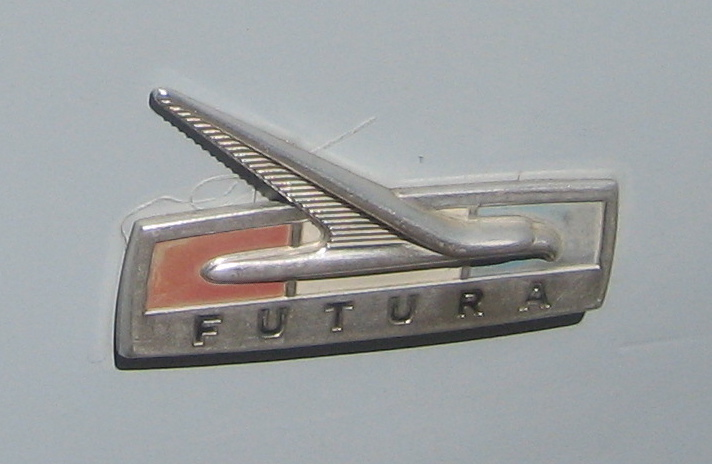
Logo plaque from 1960s US Futura

Ford Futura was scheduled to denote a new sedan entry for the North American market in 2005 (the 2006 model year), the car it was destined for was renamed Ford Fusion while still under development, due to a trademark dispute. Futura proved to be owned by the Pep Boys auto parts chain, due to a tire line marketed by them under that brand. Ford's claim failed because the company had not used the name for more than three years.

The company did use the name sporadically for several decades. In the 1950s, the 1955 Lincoln Futura show car was produced; it was modified in 1966, used as the basis for the Batmobile in the Batman television series. In the early 1960s, the Ford Falcon had a specialty coupe submodel called Futura, and the same was true of the Ford Fairmont in the late 1970s.

== Dutch market ==
In the 2000s, Ford in the Netherlands sold Futura special editions of many of its mainstream models.
