= Ford Falcon (FG) =

Australian full-size car

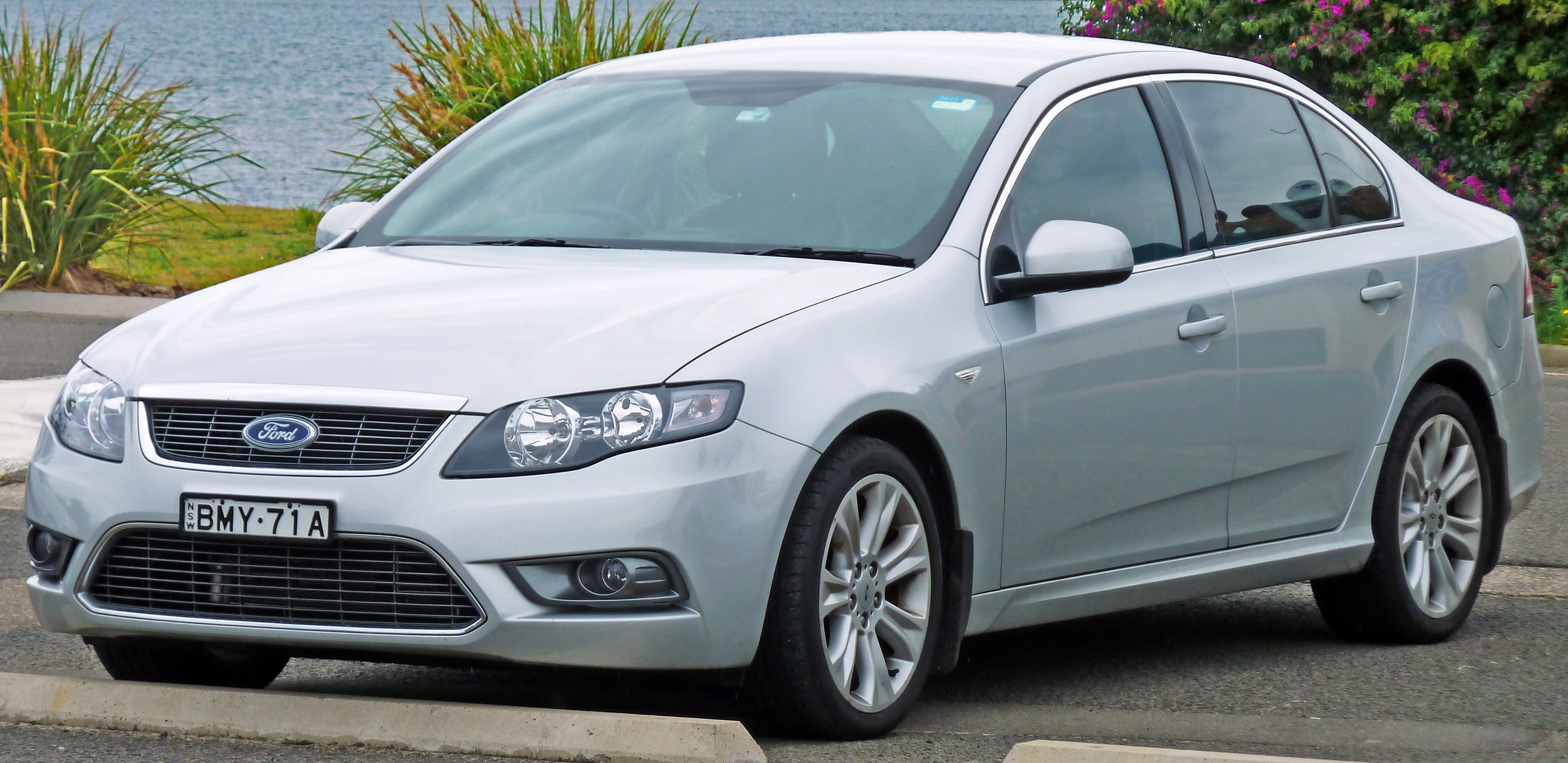
- Ford Falcon G6 Limited Edition

Overview
- Manufacturer: Ford Australia
- Production: February 2008 – October 2014
- Assembly: Australia: Melbourne, Victoria (Broadmeadows)
- Designer: Steve Park

Body and chassis
- Class: Full-size (E)
- Body style: 4-door sedan 2-door coupé utility 2-door cab chassis utility
- Layout: FR layout
- Platform: E8 (FoA Orion)

Powertrain
- Engine: Inline-four: 2.0 L Ecoboost (2012–2014); Straight-six: 4.0 L Barra 195; 4.0 L Barra E-Gas (2008–2011); 4.0 L Barra EcoLPi (2011–2014); 4.0 L Barra 270T; 4.0 L Barra 310T (FPV); V8: 5.4 L BOSS 290; 5.4 L BOSS 302 (FPV); 5.4 L BOSS 315 (FPV); 5.0 L BOSS 315 (FPV); 5.0 L BOSS 335 (FPV)
- Transmission: 4-speed M93LE automatic (E-Gas); 5-speed 5R55S automatic (I6); 6-speed 6HP 21 automatic (I4); 6-speed 6HP 26 automatic (I6, V8); 6-speed TR-6060 manual

Dimensions
- Wheelbase: 2,838 mm (111.7 in)
- Length: 4,955 mm (195.1 in) (XT)
- Width: 1,868 mm (73.5 in)
- Height: 1,453 mm (57.2 in)
- Kerb weight: 1,704 kg (3,757 lb) (XT)

Chronology
- Predecessor: Ford Falcon (BF)
- Successor: Ford Falcon (FG X)

The Ford Falcon (FG) is a full-sized car that was produced by Ford Australia from 2008 to 2014. It was the first iteration of the seventh and last generation of the Falcon. Its range no longer featured the Fairmont luxury badge, replaced instead by the G Series.

== Introduction and changes ==
The FG series Falcon was first previewed at a press event on 17 February 2008 and sold until October 2014.

Range change

To make a fresh start, Ford Australia decided to revolutionize the designation of all models within the range. In particular, the long-standing Futura, Fairmont, and Fairmont Ghia models were replaced by the more contemporary G6 and G6 E models. The FG moniker references the now-discontinued Fairmont Ghia. The FG was superseded in December 2014, by the FG X series.

== Powertrains ==
The standard FG Falcon engine is a 24-valve, 4.0-litre, in-line six (I6) with variable cam timing, which produces peak power of 195 kW (261 hp) at 6000 rpm and peak torque of 391 N⋅m (288 lb⋅ft) at 3250 rpm on regular 91-octane fuels. This power output raises up to 210 kW and 422 N⋅m with 98-octane fuels. From July 2010, all I6 engines (excluding E-Gas models) meet Euro 4 emission standards. The ZF six-speed automatic is an optional extra, the XR6 series having a five-speed as standard. This, combined with hardware updates, has improved fuel consumption to 9.9 L/100 km (29 mpg_{‑imp}; 24 mpg_{‑US}) for all entry-level, naturally aspirated petrol sedans and 10.7 L/100 km (26 mpg_{‑imp}; 22 mpg_{‑US}) for the equivalent utility variants. The high-performance, turbocharged version of the I6 produces 270 kW (362 hp) at 5250 rpm and 533 N⋅m (393 lb⋅ft) of torque from 1950 rpm; this engine is available in the XR6 Turbo and G6 E Turbo with the 10-second over-boost function that increases torque to 640 Nm and power to 324 kW. The Turbo variant makes as much as 515 N⋅m (380 lb⋅ft) of torque at just 1250 rpm.

In 2011, Ford introduced a new LPG system to the Falcon; marketed as "EcoLPI", the system features liquid injection as opposed to the vapour setup used in the previous E-Gas system. The new injection setup is accompanied by new lightweight pistons and rings, a higher compression ratio of 12.0:1, and other modifications that improve power and economy. The power has risen 27% from 156 to 198 kW (209 to 266 hp) at 5000 rpm, and torque has risen 10% from 374 to 409 N⋅m (276 to 302 lb⋅ft) at 3250 rpm. These figures virtually match the petrol version for power and torque when running on 95 octane fuel. In addition to the power gains, fuel use has dropped by around 15%, while the peak power of 198 kW (266 hp) is reached at just 5000 rpm. In addition to the engine improvements, the new LPG system now features a six-speed automatic as standard. The new system was available from July 2011 and was an option on models fitted with the naturally aspirated, I6 engine.

Ford introduced the 2.0L Ecoboost engine in 2012. which will reputedly use 20% less fuel and emit significantly less CO_{2} emissions than the current 4.0L engine. The engine was to have at least 179 kW (240 hp) and 353 N⋅m (260 lb⋅ft), with peak torque from 2,000 to 5,500 rpm. The fuel consumption was estimated at 8 L/100 km (29 mpg_{‑US}; 35 mpg_{‑imp}). The Falcon would be the first rear-drive application using the Ecoboost engine, but not capable of matching 380 N⋅m (280 lb⋅ft) of torque available at as low as 1500 rpm on the 4.0L petrol version due to the 4.0L petrol version's twin independent variable cam timing, a new intake manifold, new cam profiles, and combustion-chamber changes over the Barra182. The Barra190 and 195 were virtually identical except for the intake manifold and an extra knock sensor for the Barra195, allowing it to use (as above) RON98 to gain significant torque and power gains.

== Safety ==
The FG range achieved an ANCAP five-star safety rating, being the first Australian manufactured car to do so, achieving a score of 35.6 out of 37.

ANCAP test results* Ford Falcon all variants (2008)
Test	Score
Overall	5 /5 stars
Frontal offset	14.61/16
Side impact	16/16
Pole	2/2
Seat belt reminders	2/3
Whiplash protection	Not Assessed
Pedestrian protection	Marginal
Electronic stability control	Standard

ANCAP test results* Ford Falcon Ute variants with dual frontal airbags (2008)
Test	Score
Overall	4 /5 stars
Frontal offset	14.62/16
Side impact	13.89/16
Pole	Not Assessed
Seat belt reminders	1/3
Whiplash protection	Not Assessed
Pedestrian protection	Marginal
Electronic stability control	Optional

ANCAP test results* Ford Falcon Ute variants fitted with ESC and 4 airbags (2008)
Test	Score
Overall	5 /5 stars
Frontal offset	14.62/16
Side impact	15.96/16
Pole	2/2
Seat belt reminders	1/3
Whiplash protection	Not Assessed
Pedestrian protection	Marginal
Electronic stability control	Optional

ANCAP test results* Ford Falcon Ute all variants (2011)
Test	Score
Overall	5 /5 stars
Frontal offset	14.62/16
Side impact	15.96/16
Pole	2/2
Seat belt reminders	2/3
Whiplash protection	Good
Pedestrian protection	Marginal
Electronic stability control	Standard

== Model range ==
The Ford FG Falcon comprised seven different trim levels, divided into three distinct groups:

- Base Falcon - XT
- Luxury Falcon - G-Series
- Sports Falcon - XR

The specific models included the Falcon XT; the luxury G6, G6E, and G6E Turbo; and the sports XR6, XR6 Turbo, and XR8. The utility variants included the base Falcon Ute, R6, XR6, XR6 Turbo, and XR8.

=== Falcon XT ===
The XT is the base model of the FG Falcon range. It has a standard suspension tune; the rear suspension is Ford's Control Blade IRS, and the front suspension is the virtual pivot link, the same architecture as found in the Territory. The brakes are carried over from the BF Falcon. The engine is the revised I6 Barra engine, which now produces 195 kW (261 hp) at 6000 rpm and 391 N⋅m (288 lb⋅ft) of torque.

The naturally aspirated XT engine specification is identical to the nonturbo XR6, G6, G6E, and Utility vehicle variants powered by the 4.0 L engine. At launch, the standard transmission was a new five-speed auto, replacing the previous Australian designed and made four-speed. The ZF six-speed automatic was optional from the launch in 2008. In July 2010, the six-speed was made standard. Both the five- and six-speed transmissions retain the 2.73:1 final open-differential ratio, with LSD optional on XR6 models.

The new styling is based around the kinetic design Ford Europe uses for their cars. The interior was improved from the previous model. The centre console was lifted to make for a more luxurious and spacious feeling. The interior is more roomy and has better entry and exit for front and rear passengers. The XT is now better equipped, with an MP3-compatible CD player, 3.5 mm (0.14 in) auxiliary audio input jack, single-zone automatic climate control, cruise control, 60/40 split fold-down rear seat back, front and rear power windows, four airbags, dynamic stability control with emergency brake assist, and a driver-fatigue warning system. From 1 September 2008, all XT models were specified with alloy wheels as standard equipment, previously an extra-cost option. This replaced the 16" x 6.5" steel wheels that used plastic wheel covers or centre hubcaps.

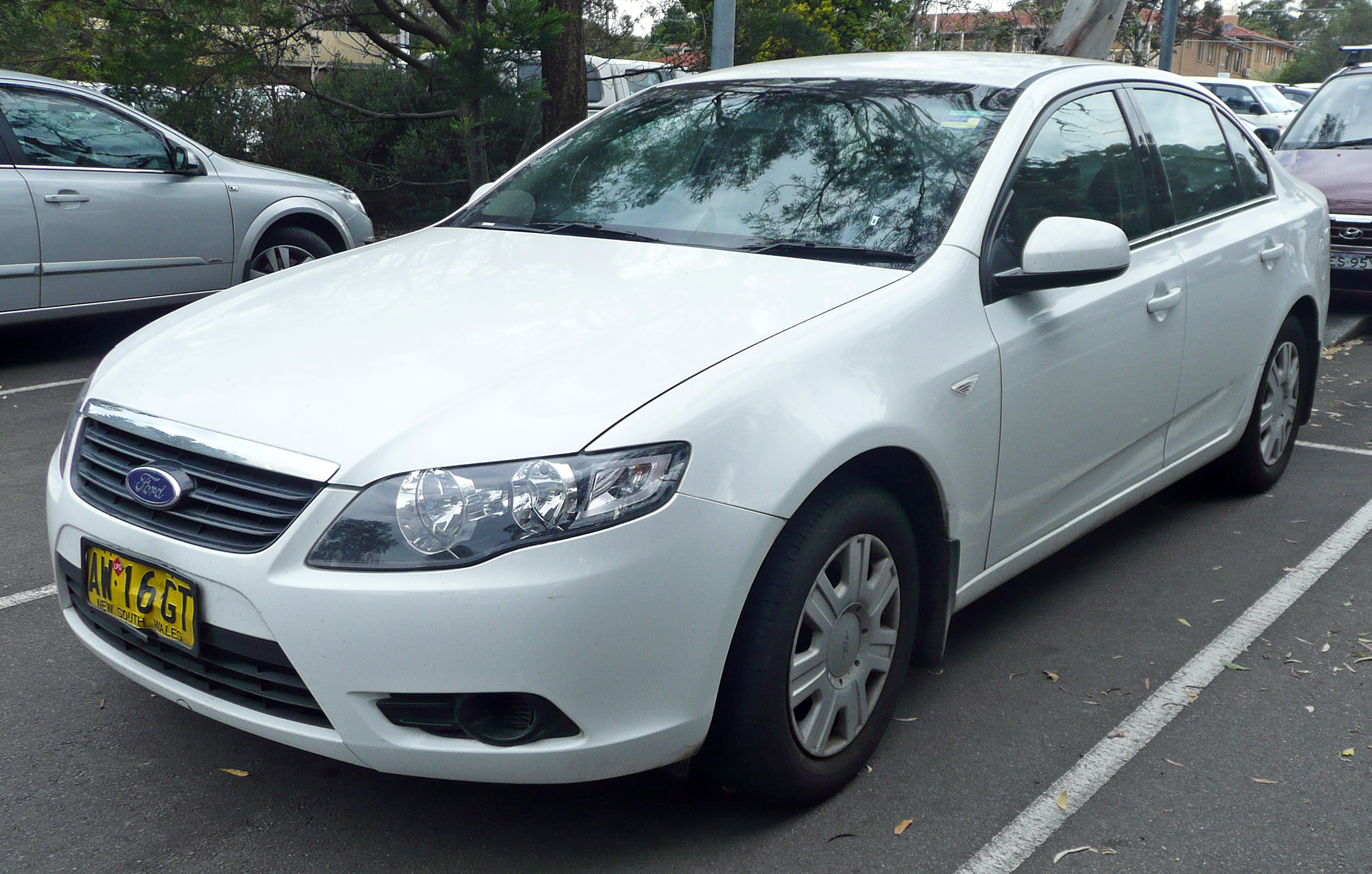
Ford Falcon XT

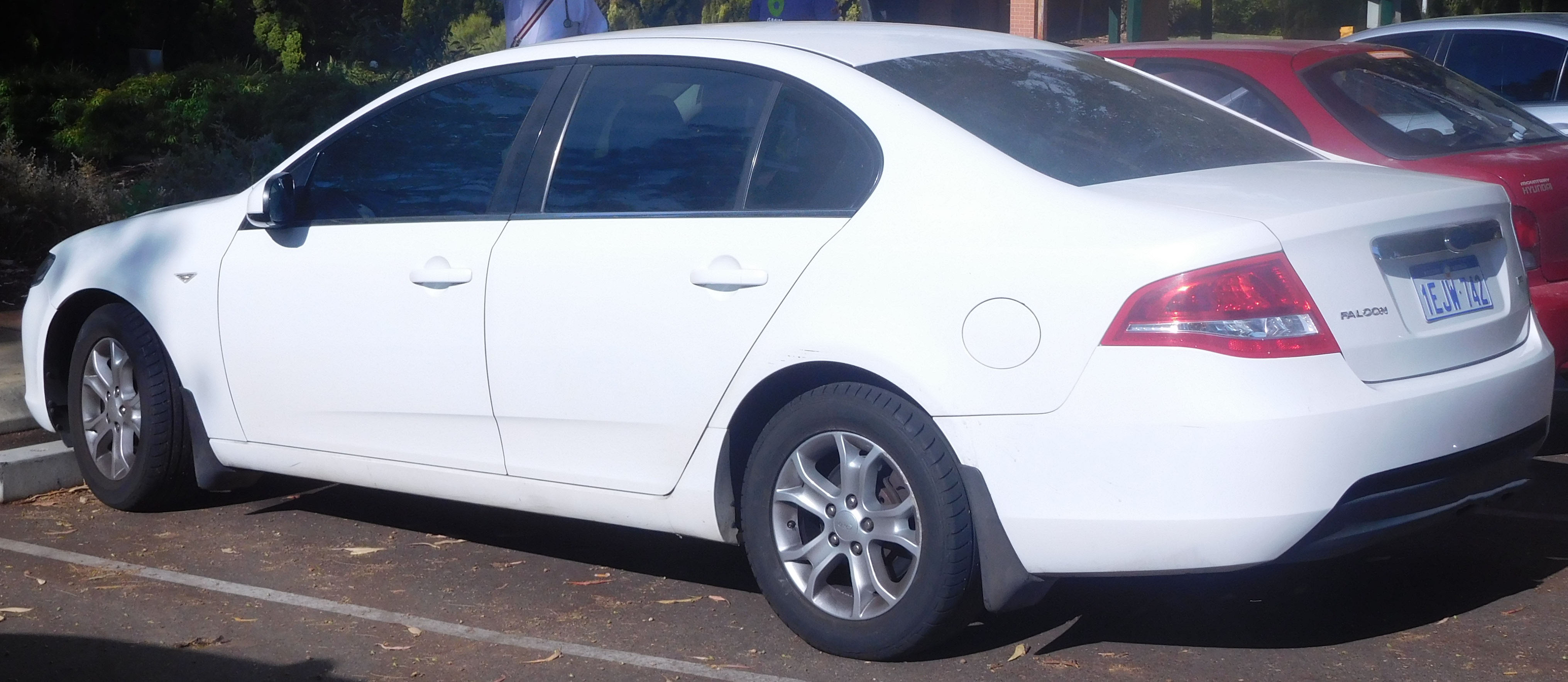
Ford Falcon XT

Ford Falcon XT taxi

=== Falcon XR6 ===
The base model in the XR range, which features the same 4.0 L I6 engine found in the XT, G6, and G6E, coming with a different ECU with a unique sport-tune. It came with a five- or six-speed automatic transmission, or a six-speed manual transmission, 17 x 8-inch, five-spoke alloy wheels; optional 18- or 19-inch wheels were available, Sports Control Blade independent rear suspension, Sports body kit with side skirts and rear bumper, rear spoiler, front fog lamps, leather-wrapped steering wheel with mounted audio controls, Bluetooth as an extra, alloy pedal covers, and cloth sports seats. As of July 2010, the five-speed automatic was no longer available to purchase due to the range upgrading to the ZF six-speed across all models.

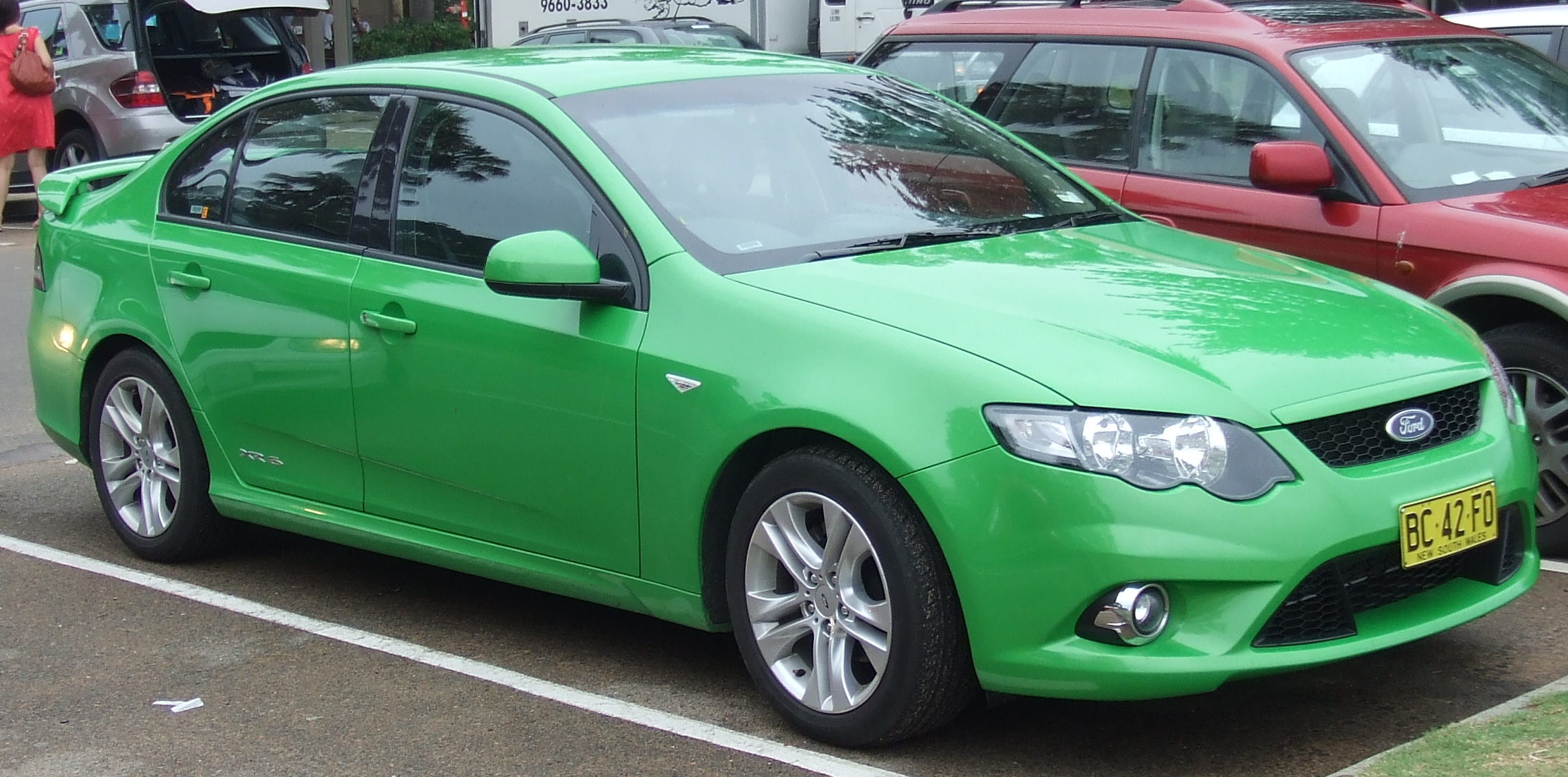
Ford Falcon XR6

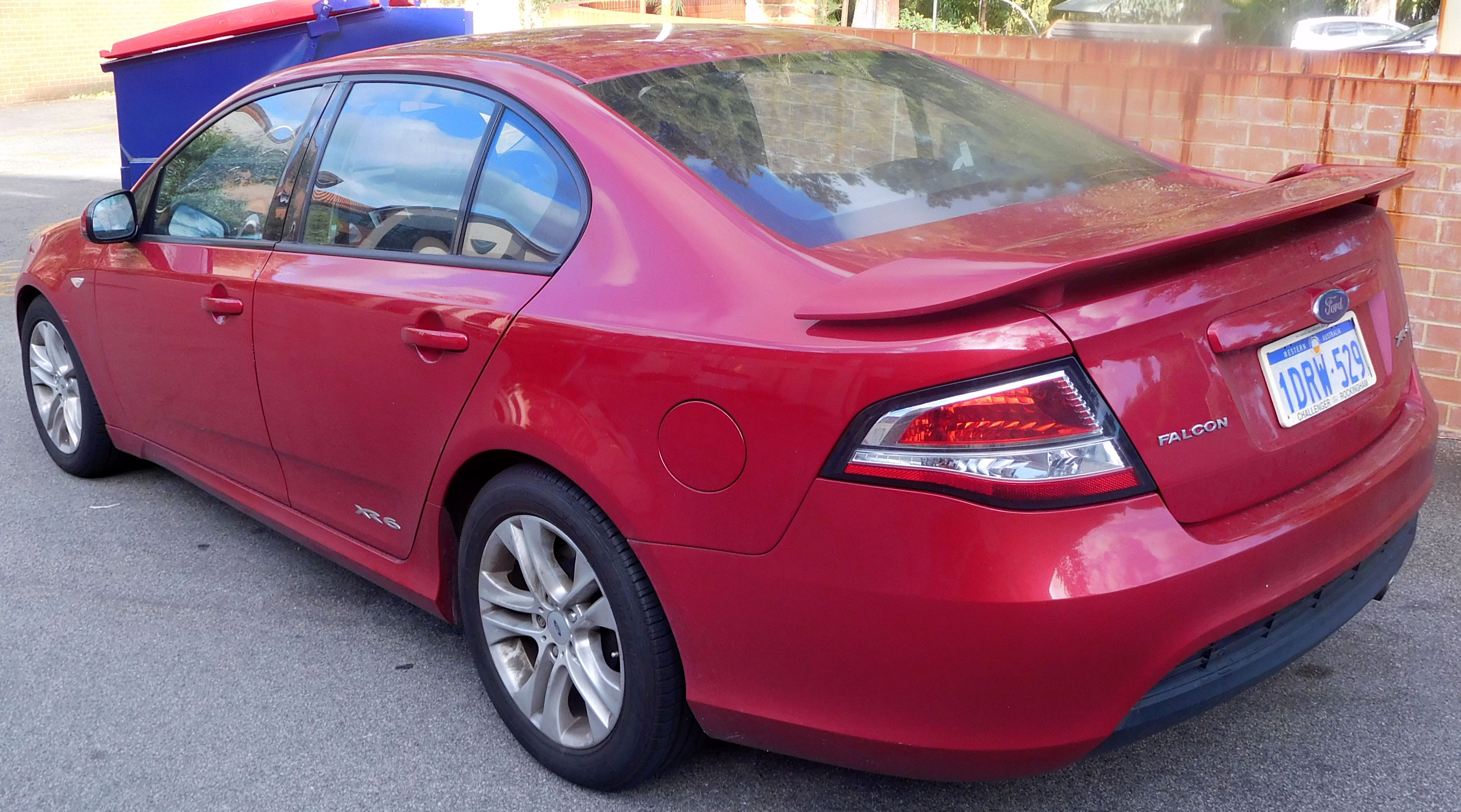
Ford Falcon XR6

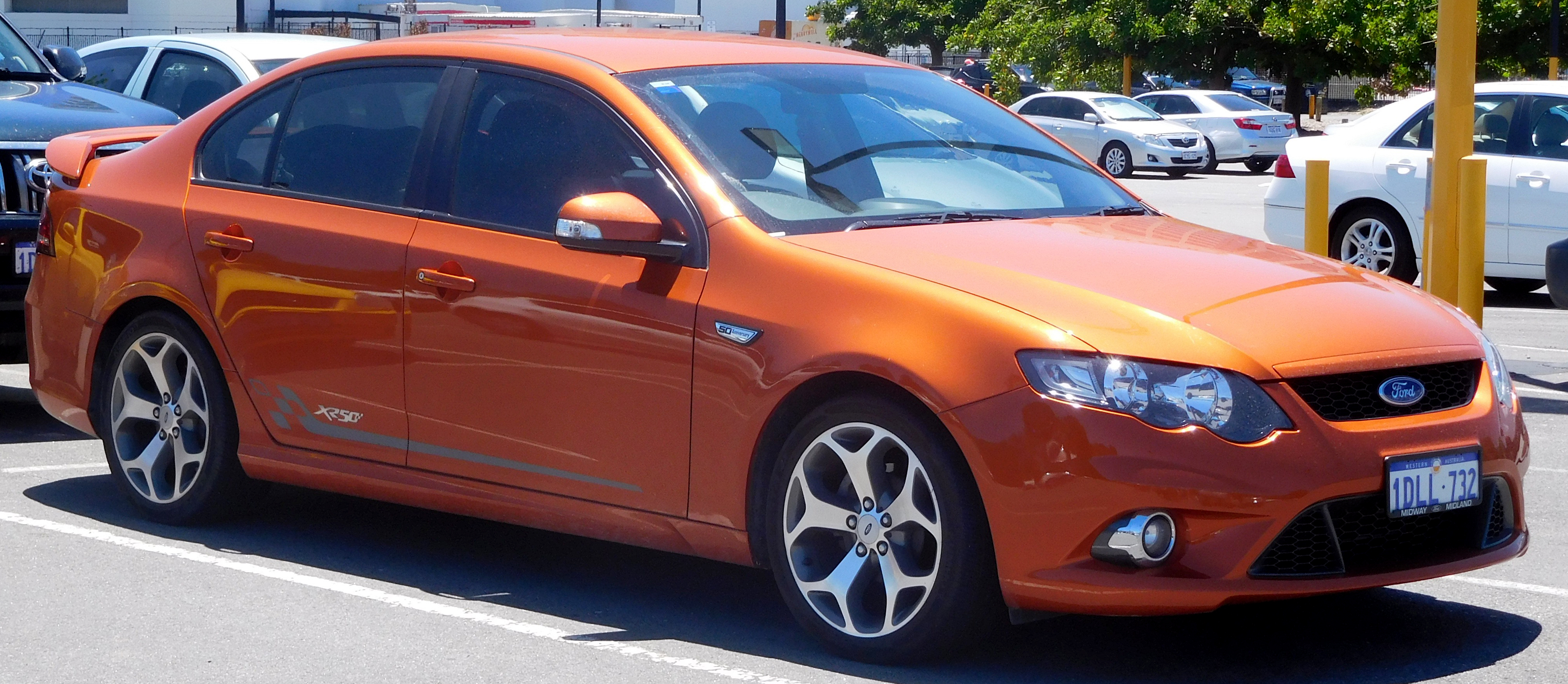
Ford Falcon XR6 50th Anniversary

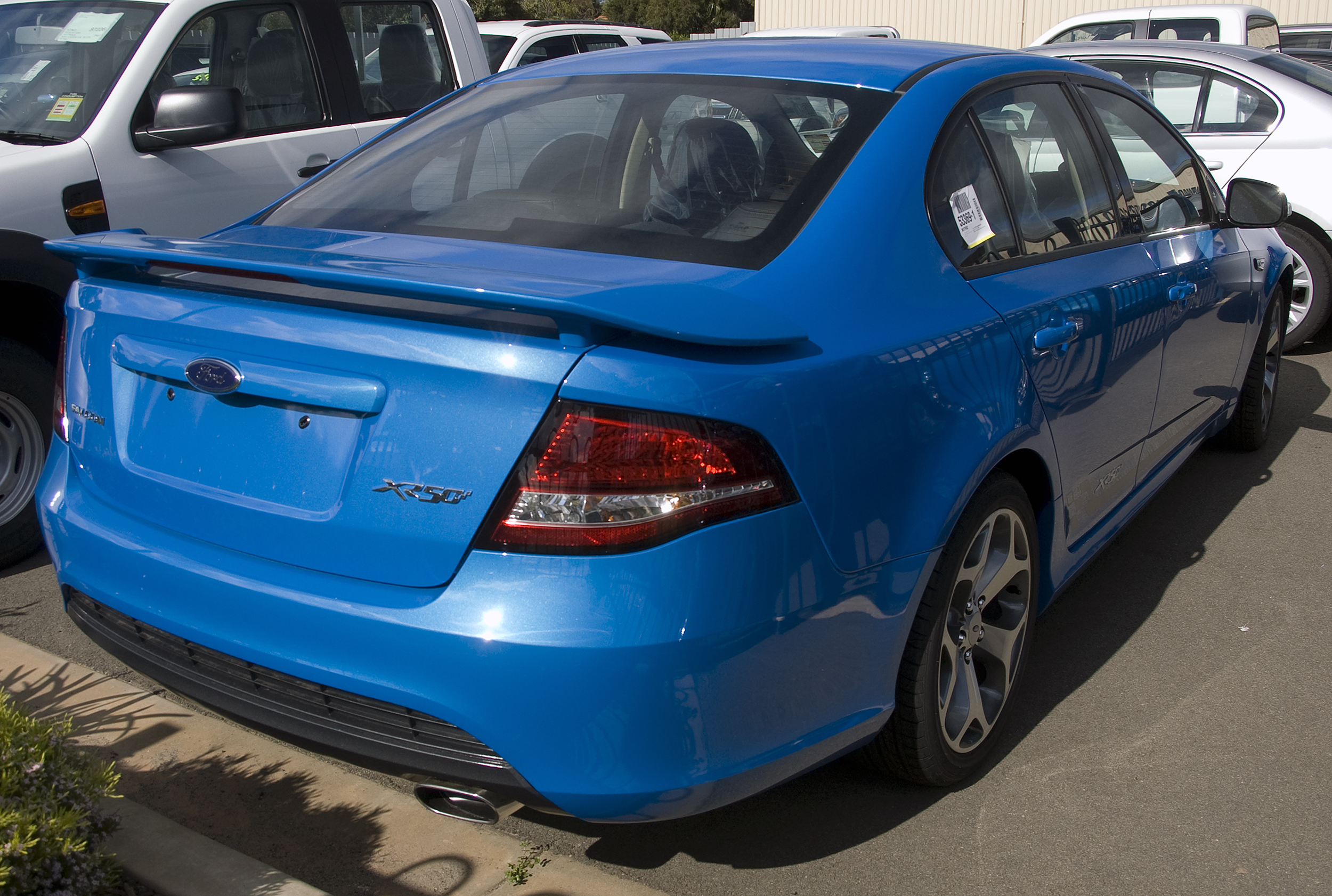
Ford Falcon XR6 50th Anniversary

=== Falcon XR6 Turbo ===
The Turbo model of the XR6 came with all of the features of the standard XR6 plus 18 x 8-inch, five-spoke, alloy wheels, limited-slip differential, and upgraded front brakes (322 mm rotors instead of the standard 298 mm) without an option for 328 x 26 mm ventilated rear discs as found on BF Mk1 XR6T and XR8 models, losing on the braking capacity overall with 303 x 16 mm solid rear discs, the same hardware found on the original BA XT from 2002. It uses the same 4.0 L I6 turbo engine that is found in the G6E Turbo. The six-speed automatic transmission used in turbocharged models is the 6HP26, which is rated to handle more torque than the 6HP21 used in the FGX nonturbo models. Performance-wise, it is considered the fastest model in the FG Falcon range capable of 0–100 km/h (0-62 mph) in 4.8 s, excluding the Falcon-based FPV models from Ford Australia's partner Ford Performance Vehicles. The inline-six turbocharged engine has a maximum power of 270 kW (362 hp) and maximum torque of 533 N⋅m (393 lb⋅ft). The I6 engine also has the ability to provide the driver with an "over-boost" feature, which engages temporarily when the throttle is fully depressed at speed and correct atmospheric measures are met. Once correct conditions have been met, the engine provides an increase in boost pressure up to 12 psi from a standard maximum of 10 psi, which allows for power around 310 kW (416 hp).

Both the XR6 and XR6 Turbo can be optioned with the "XR Luxury Pack", which adds sports leather seats and black carbon-look trim inserts, dual-zone climate control, 19- x 8-inch alloy wheels, and premium sound. The "Tech Pack", also available, adds Bluetooth and iPod integration; both option packs add almost all the features from the G6E (minus reversing camera, curtain and side thorax airbags, an eight-way power-adjustable driver's seat and memory mirrors, overhead sunglasses holder, and mirror indicators)

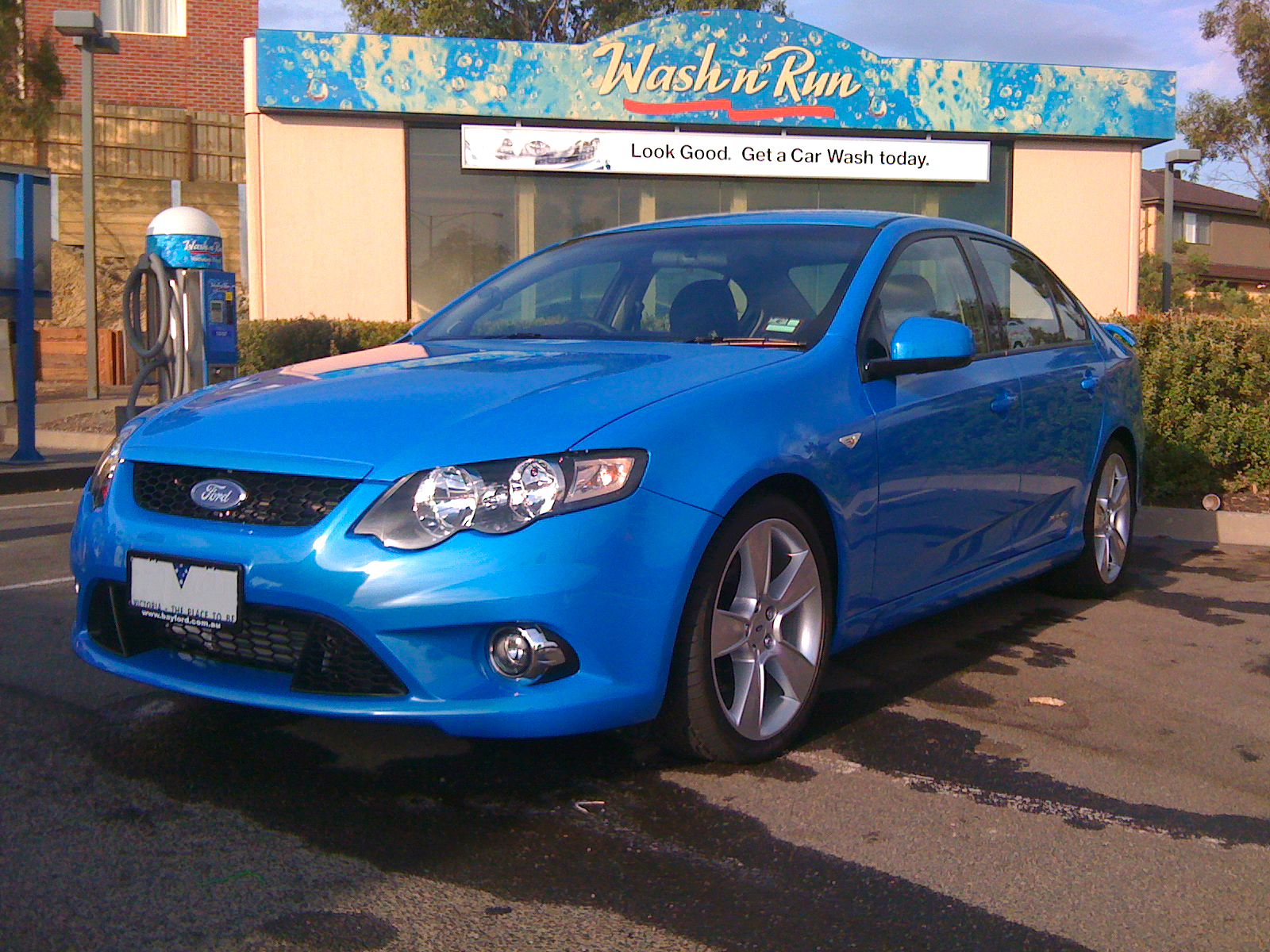
Ford Falcon XR6 Turbo

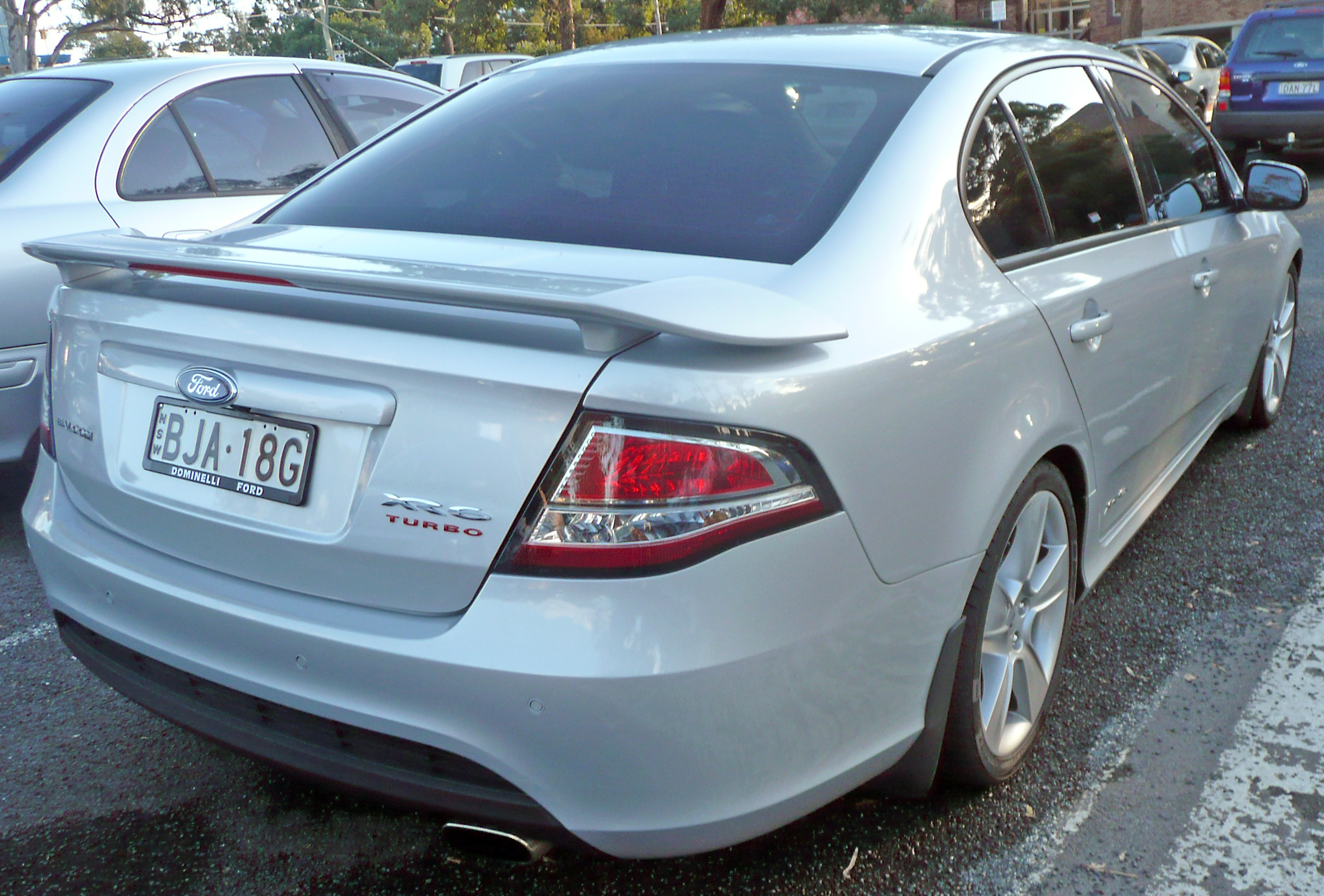
Ford Falcon XR6 Turbo

=== Falcon XR8 ===
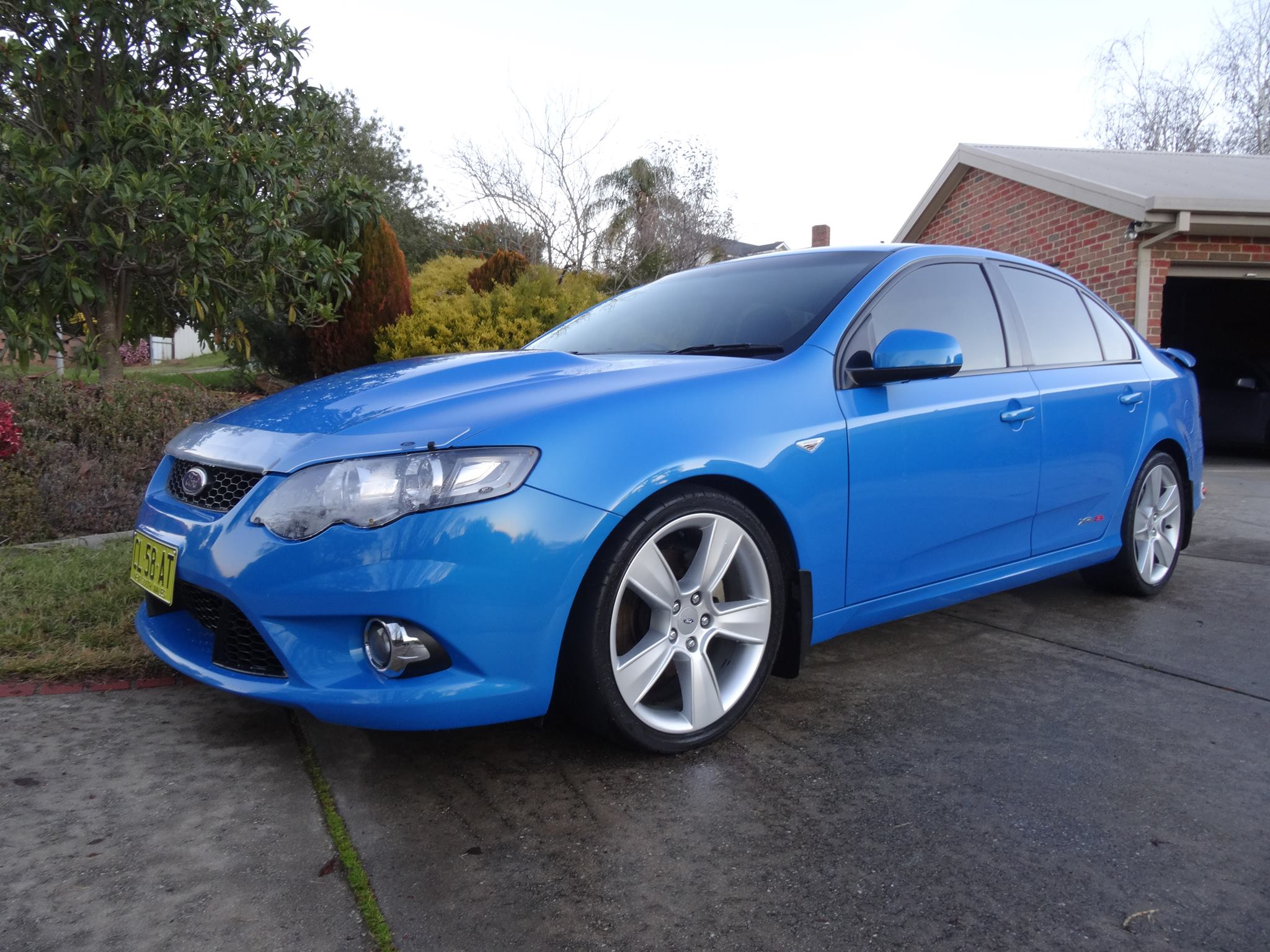
Ford Falcon XR8 with Luxury Pack

The XR8 had the same features found in the XR6 Turbo. The bulging hood and supporting emblems on the side skirts differentiated it visually from other XR models. The V8 was in a similar state of tune to the Boss 290 in the BA-BF FPV V8 models (though not exactly the same), with a maximum power of 290 kW (389 hp) and maximum torque of 520 N⋅m (380 lb⋅ft); however, its performance figures were similar to those of the XR6 Turbo despite having a 20 kW (27 hp) advantage according to official figures. A unique feature of the FG XR8 was a semi-active muffler, which opened above 2800 rpm for a throatier sound. However, the XR8 was less agile through corners than I6 variants due to a significantly heavier front end. The XR8 sold poorly compared to the XR6 Turbo, with the majority of volume being in utility sales.

The Falcon XR8 was discontinued in June 2010 as a result of its 5.4-litre engine not complying with the Euro IV emissions standard adopted by Australia at that time. The Euro IV emissions would have robbed the engine of power and torque and would have required further investment and development. Although initially expected to be reintroduced with the 5.0-litre "Coyote" engine used in the Ford Mustang GT during 2011, the model was reintroduced in 2014 with the FG-X series Falcon, featuring the 5.0-litre supercharged Miami motor.

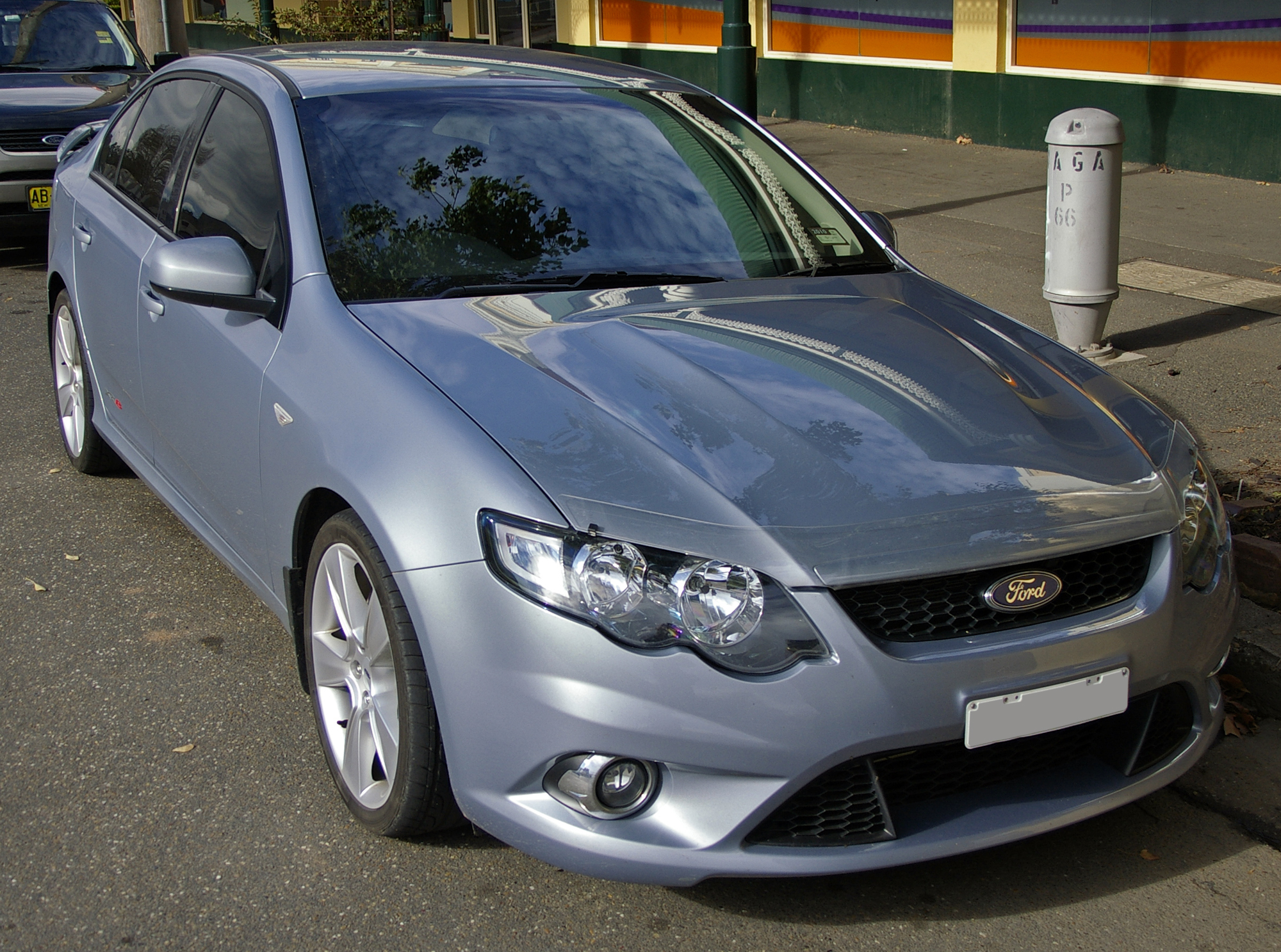
Ford Falcon XR8

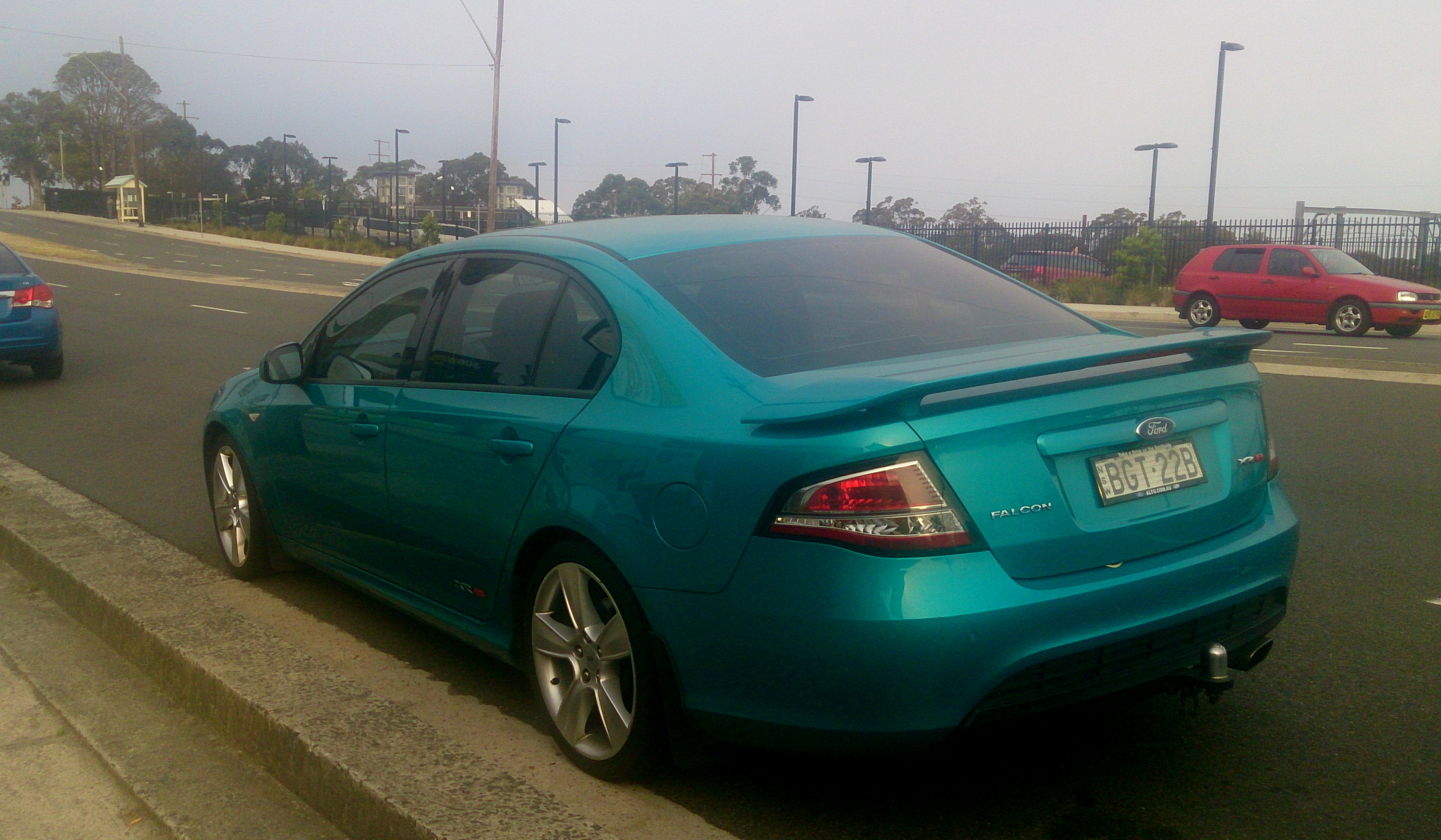
Ford Falcon XR8

=== Falcon G6 ===
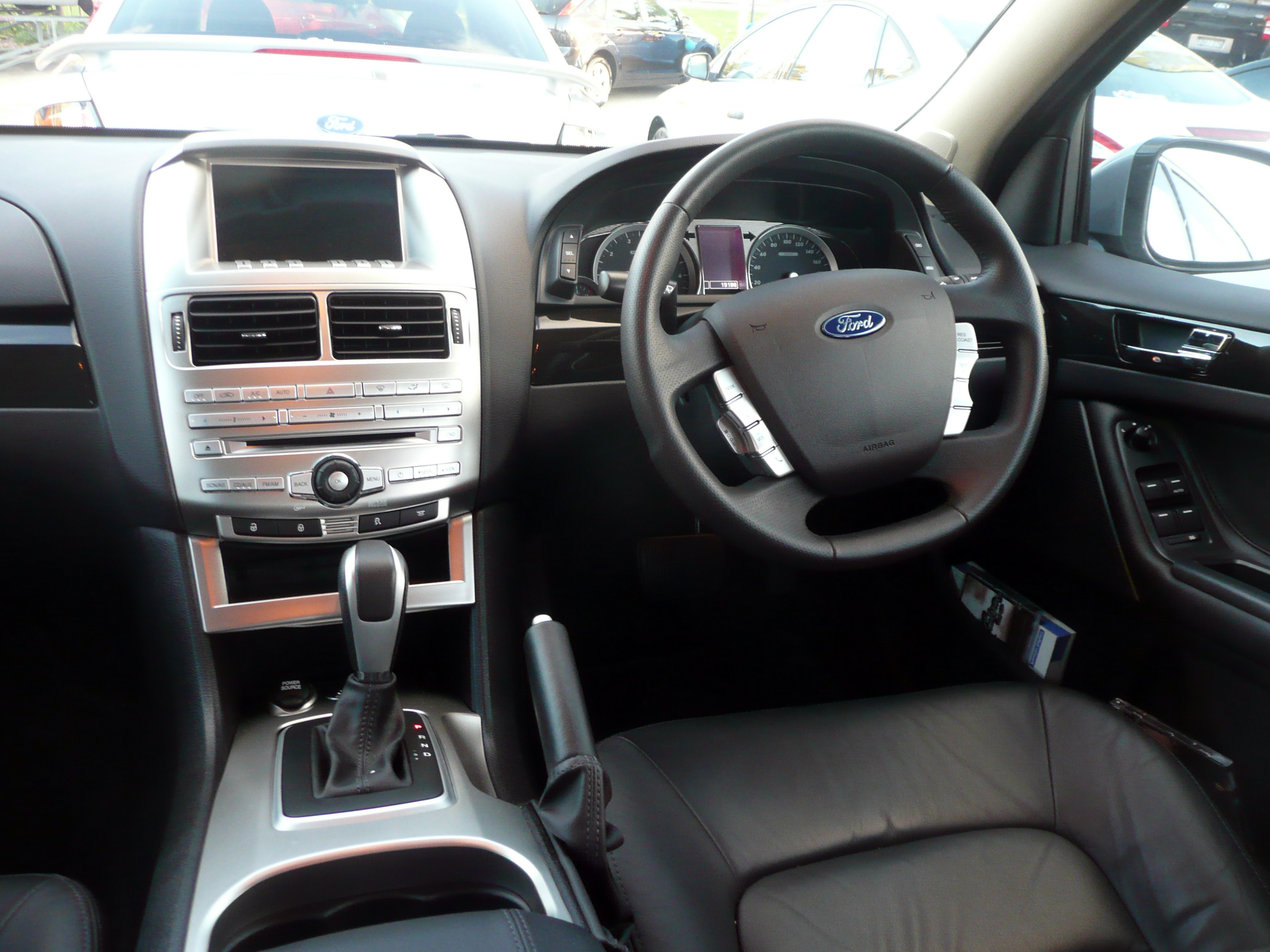
Interior, Falcon G6E

Up from the XT, this is the base model in the G Series. The G6 is the direct replacement for the Futura. It is powered by the same 4.0 L engine and was originally mated to the five-speed automatic (upgraded to the ZF six-speed automatic in 2010). Besides the suspension, which is the sport-luxury tune found in the G6E, the drivetrain of the car is the same as the XT. Equipment levels are increased in the G6. It comes with front fog lights, a leather-wrapped steering wheel with mounted audio controls, rear parking sensors, sports body kit with side skirts and rear bumper, and 17-inch alloy wheels.

A G6 Limited Edition consisting of just 1500 units, based on the G6. How many of these 1500 units were fitted with the EcoBoost engine is unknown. The G6 Limited Edition added leather seats in Shadow, Bluetooth, iPod integration, sports leather-wrapped steering wheel, unique fog-lamp bezels, unique front grille (upper and lower), a unique rear-bumper insert, side-curtain airbags, and 18-inch alloy wheels (17-inch on the E-Gas model).

GPS-equipped Ford Falcons (Ford G Series) can warn of traffic incidents via a traffic message channel.

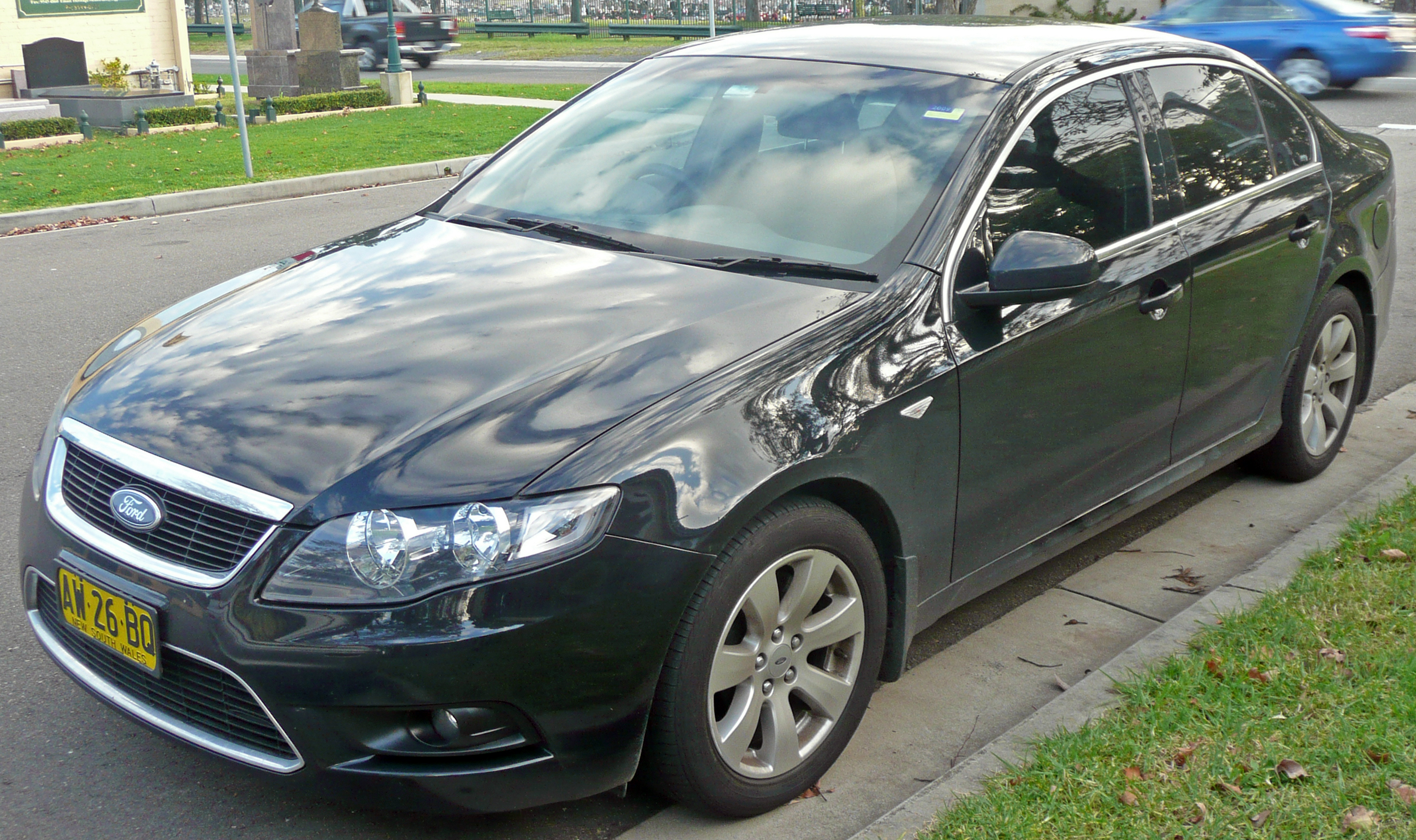
Ford Falcon G6

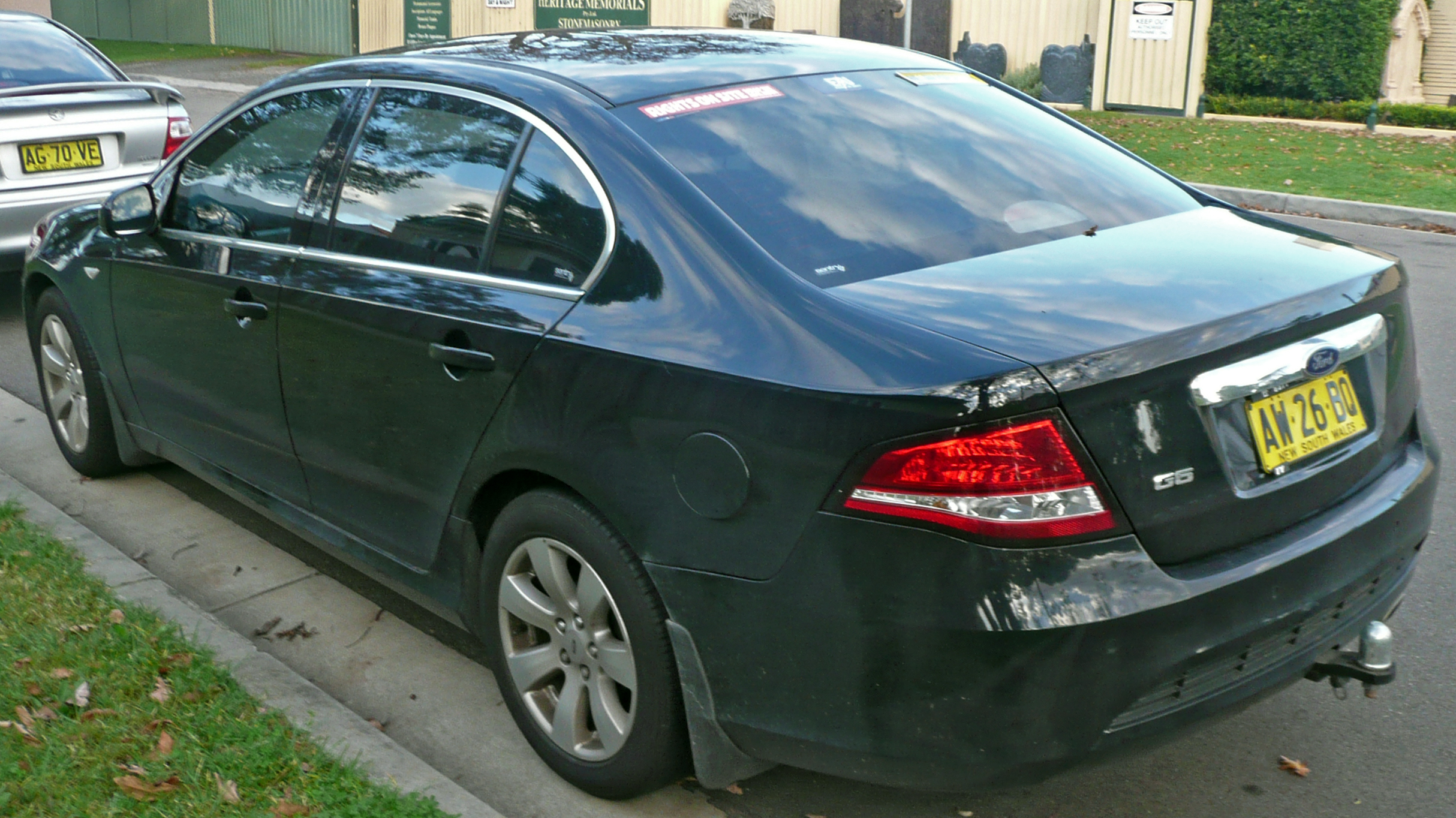
Ford Falcon G6

=== Falcon G6E ===
The G6E, a step up from the G6, is the replacement for the old Fairmont Ghia. It includes all of the features of the G6, plus a ZF six-speed automatic transmission, dual-zone automatic climate control, a premium audio system, leather seats, Bluetooth mobile phone integration, reversing camera, curtain and side thorax airbags, an eight-way, power-adjustable driver's seat, 17 x 8-inch, 10-spoke alloy wheels, front scuff plates, and an overhead sunglass console. It also features Mercedes-Benz-styled side indicators on the side mirrors, similar to those on premium European cars.

The G6E Turbo is the same as the G6E, except it has an I6 turbocharged engine, 18 x 8-inch, seven-spoke alloy wheels, lowered suspension, piano-black centre console rather than silver, iPod integration, turbo decals, and a boot-mounted spoiler. The engine is the same as that found in the XR6 Turbo.

From April 2009, an update was introduced. This involved an improvement in fuel consumption on I6 models fitted with the optional six-speed automatic. The LPG E-Gas models, like the petrol-powered versions of the FG sedan range, had been awarded the full five stars in the Australasian New Car Assessment Program crash-safety test. The five-star rating, up from four, was not due to any structural changes to the FG, but by the introduction of electronic stability control (ESC), which was previously only fitted to petrol-powered FG sedans. ESC also was made standard on the E-Gas BF III Falcon wagons still in production (previously unavailable). ESC fitment was extended to the utility body styles from May 2009, excluding the base XL and R6 Ute, where it was optional. From June 2010, all sedan models received Bluetooth mobile phone and iPod integrations as standard equipment.

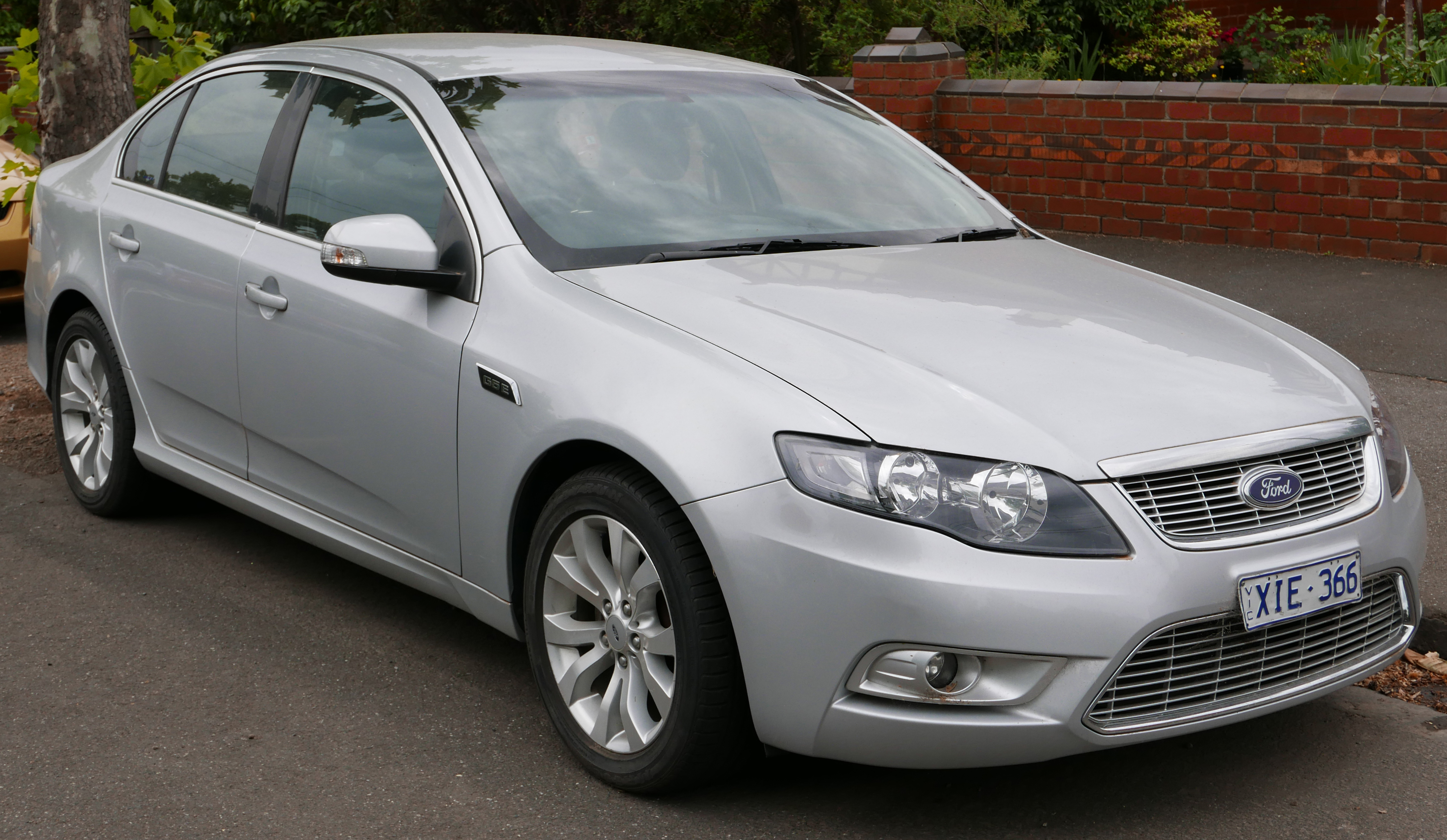
Ford Falcon G6E

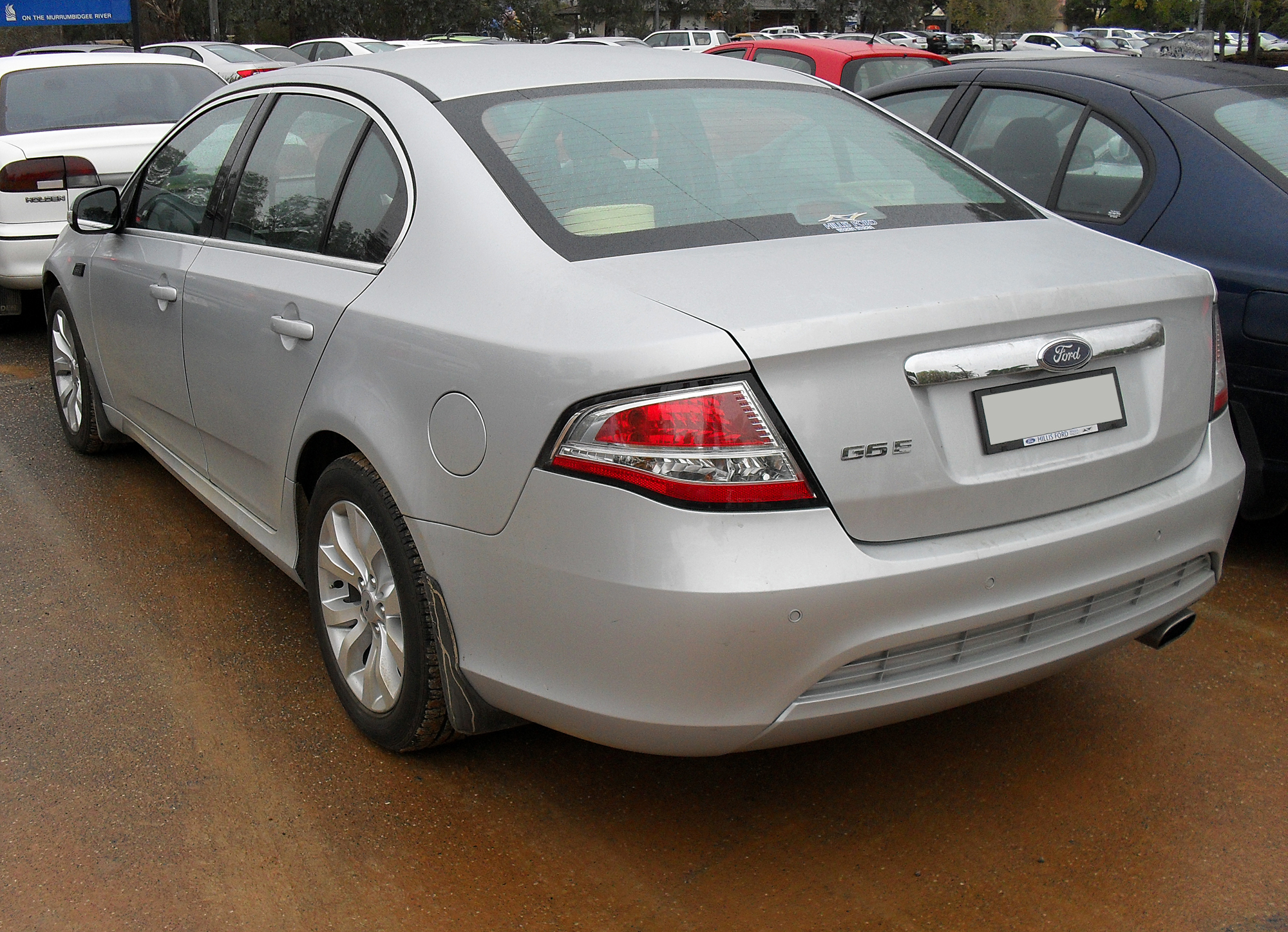
Ford Falcon G6E

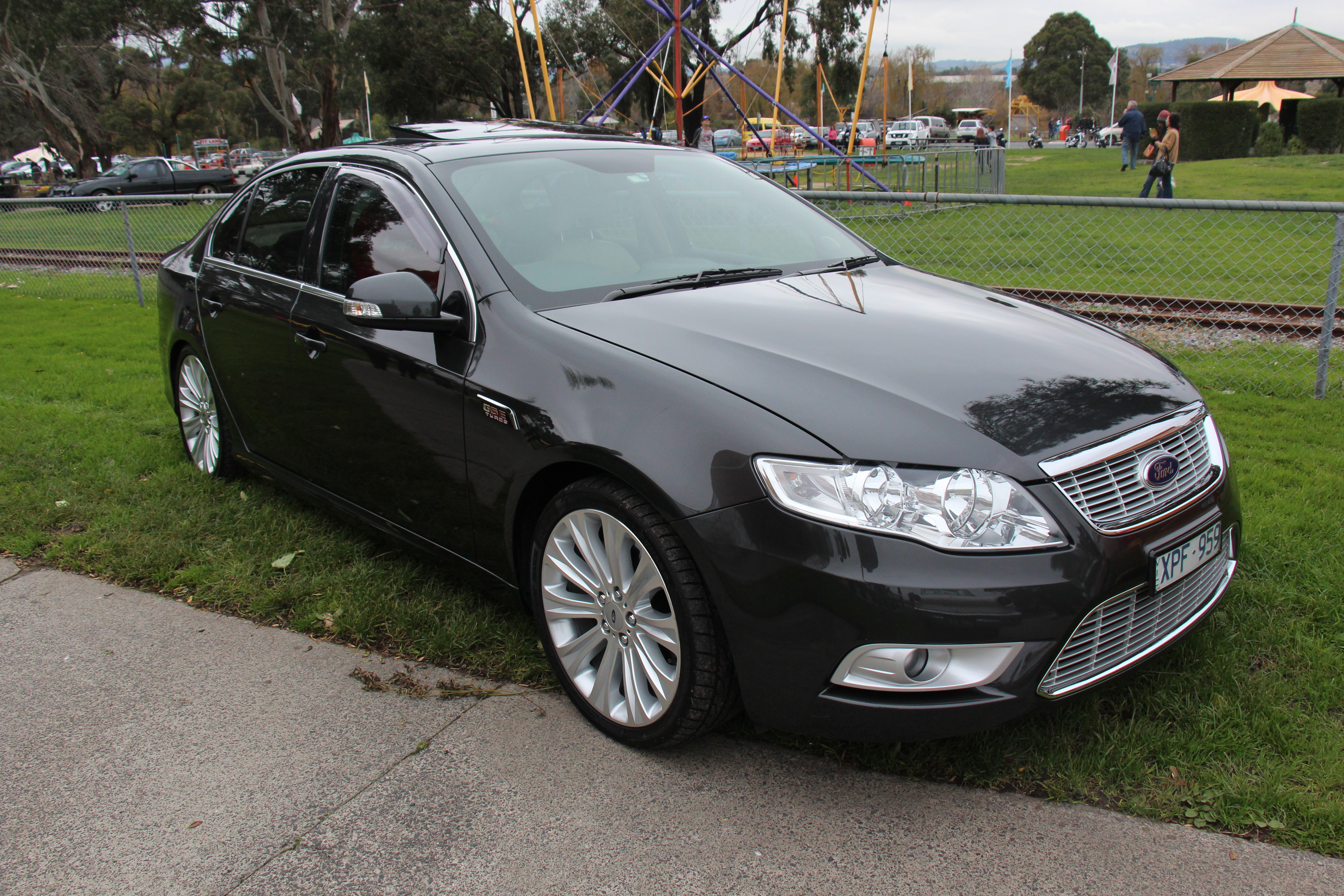
Ford Falcon G6E Turbo

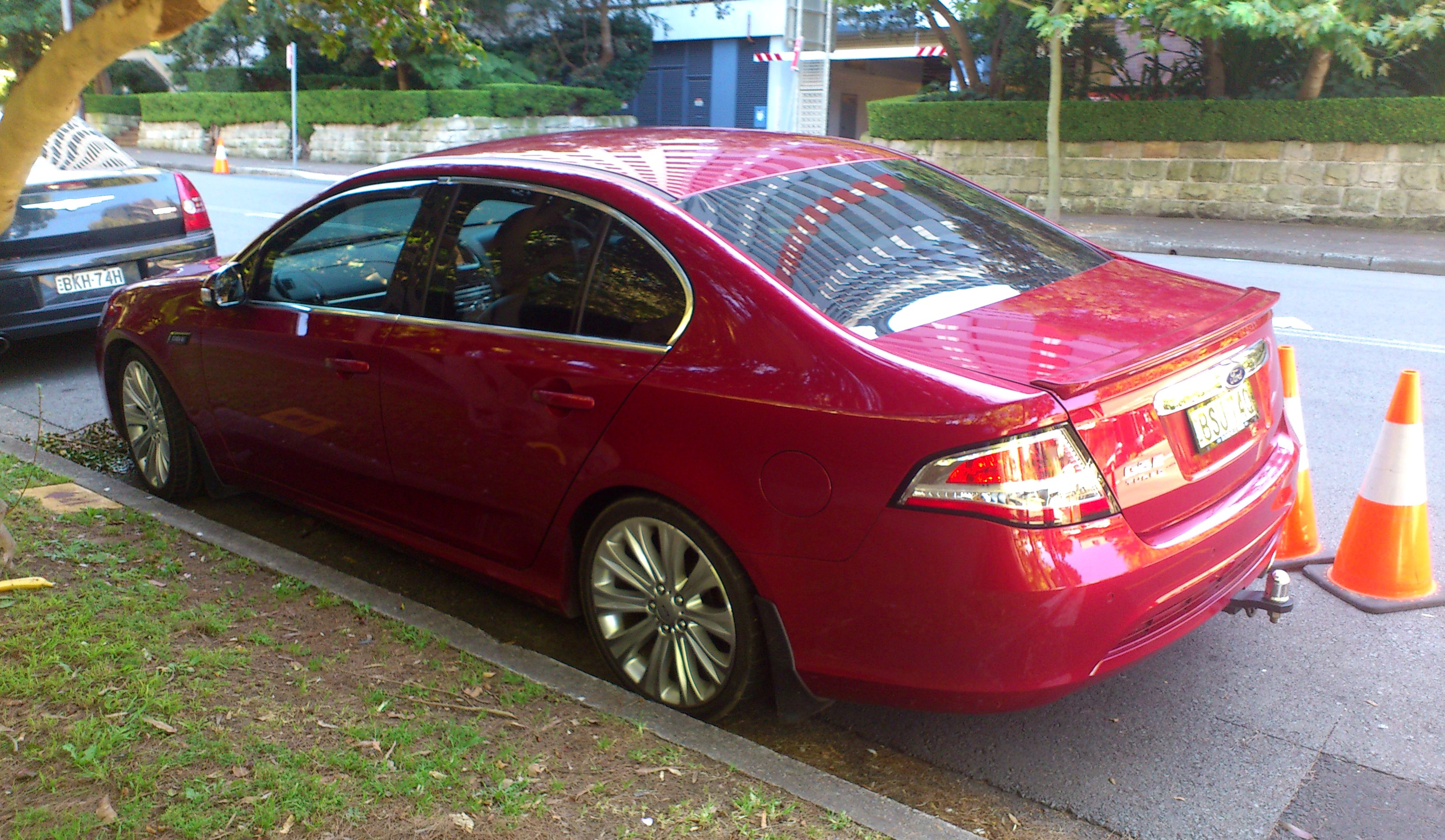
Ford Falcon G6E Turbo

== Model changes ==
=== Mk II ===
The Mk II, introduced in 2011, was the first major visual upgrade for the FG Falcon since its introduction in 2008. The MkII has a revised front fascia similar to that of the SZ Ford Territory, including a smaller upper grille and a larger octagonal lower grille, along with revised headlight and fog light assemblies; G6E and G6E turbo models came standard with LED running lights. All new specification levels (except XT and XL) got the new Interior Command Centre, the unit is an 8-inch touch screen with 2D and 3D maps, SUNA traffic updates, overspeed and speed camera warnings, and street house number display, and is fully integrated.

Improved safety features on the MkII included six airbags (dual front, side, and curtains) as standard on all sedan models, the Generation 9.0 dynamic stability control system was standard across the range and rear parking sensors were now standard. The MkII was placed on sale in late 2011, with a turbocharged four-cylinder EcoBoost engine option becoming available in early 2012.

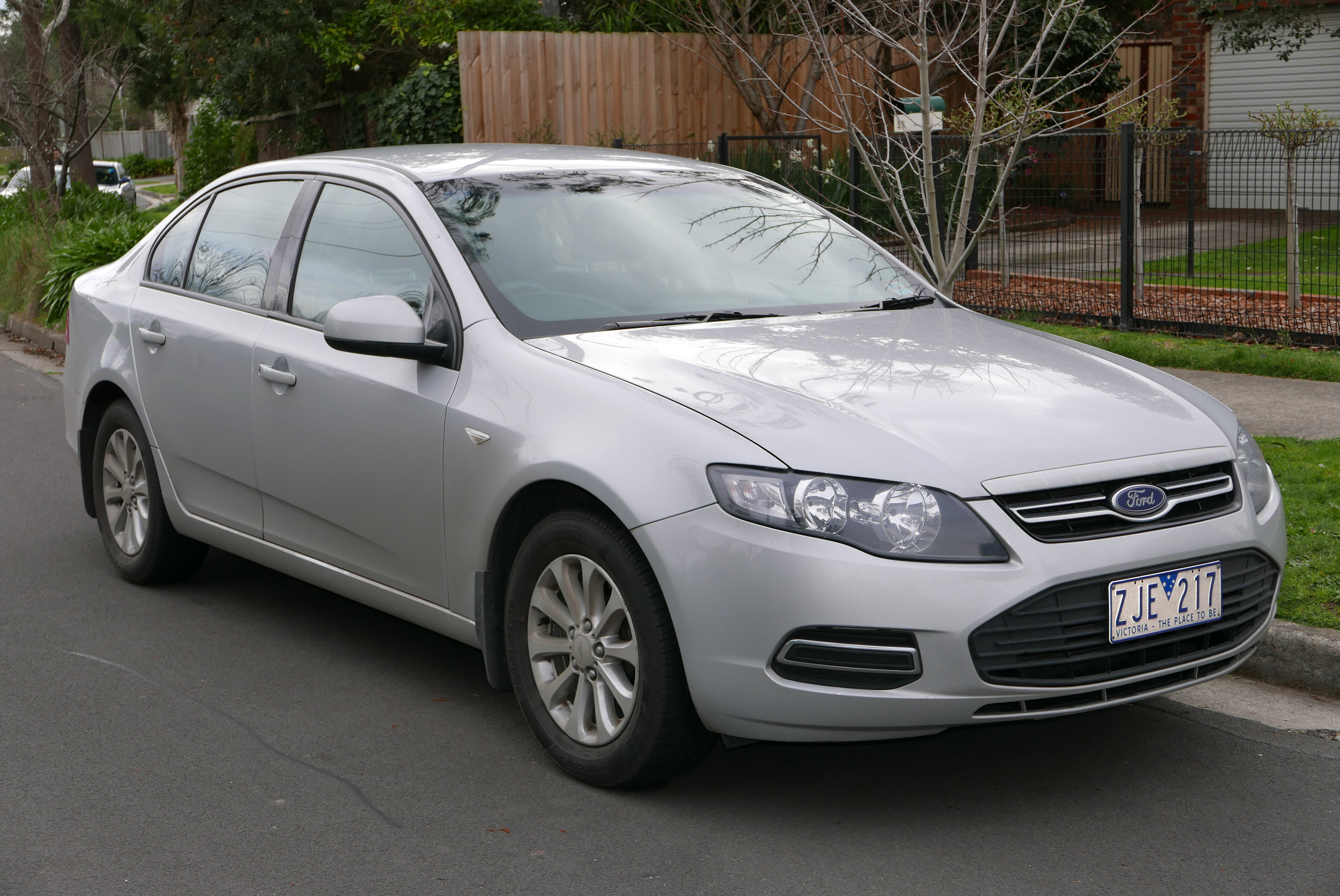
Ford Falcon XT (Mk II)

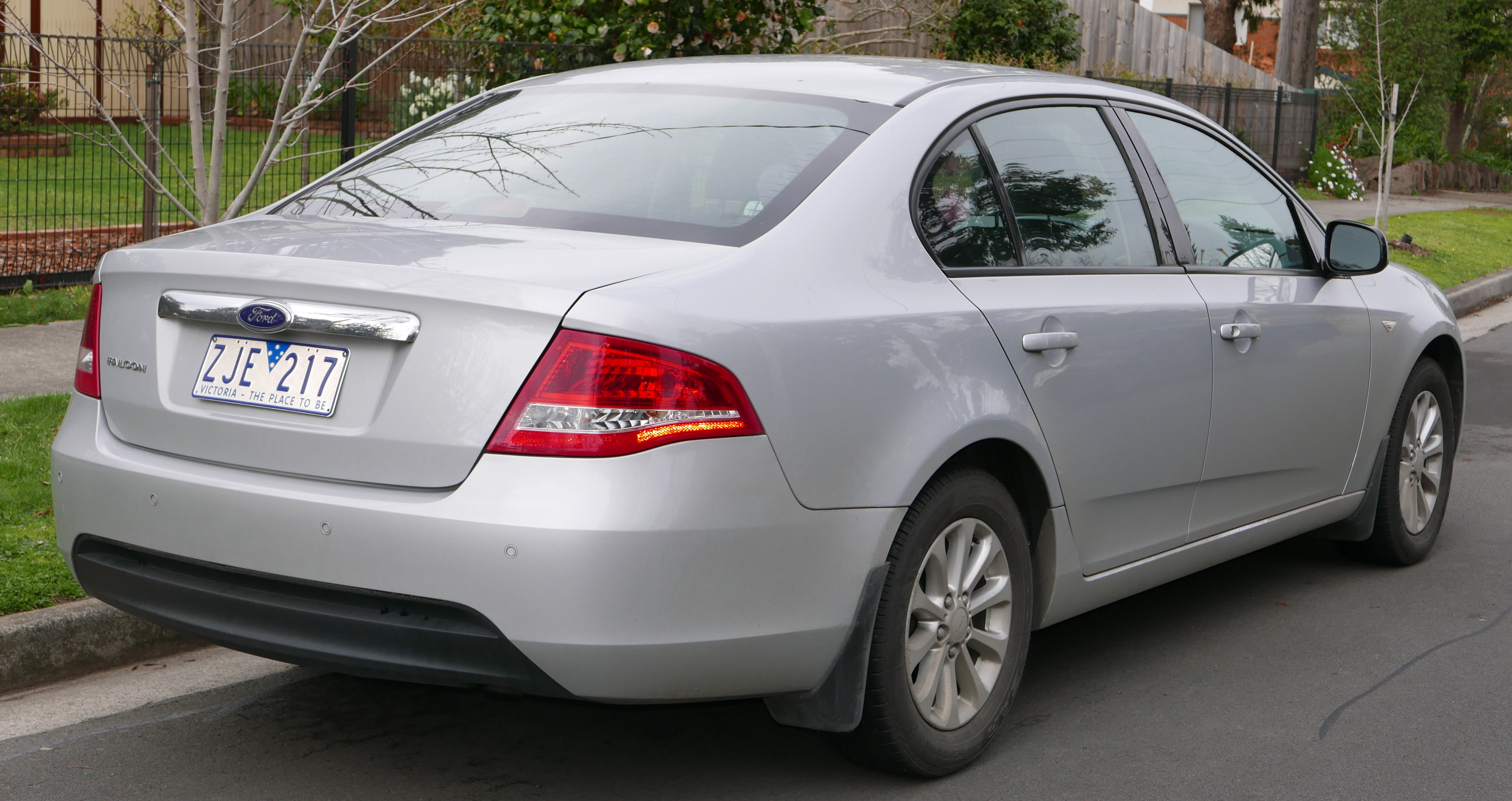
Ford Falcon XT (Mk II)

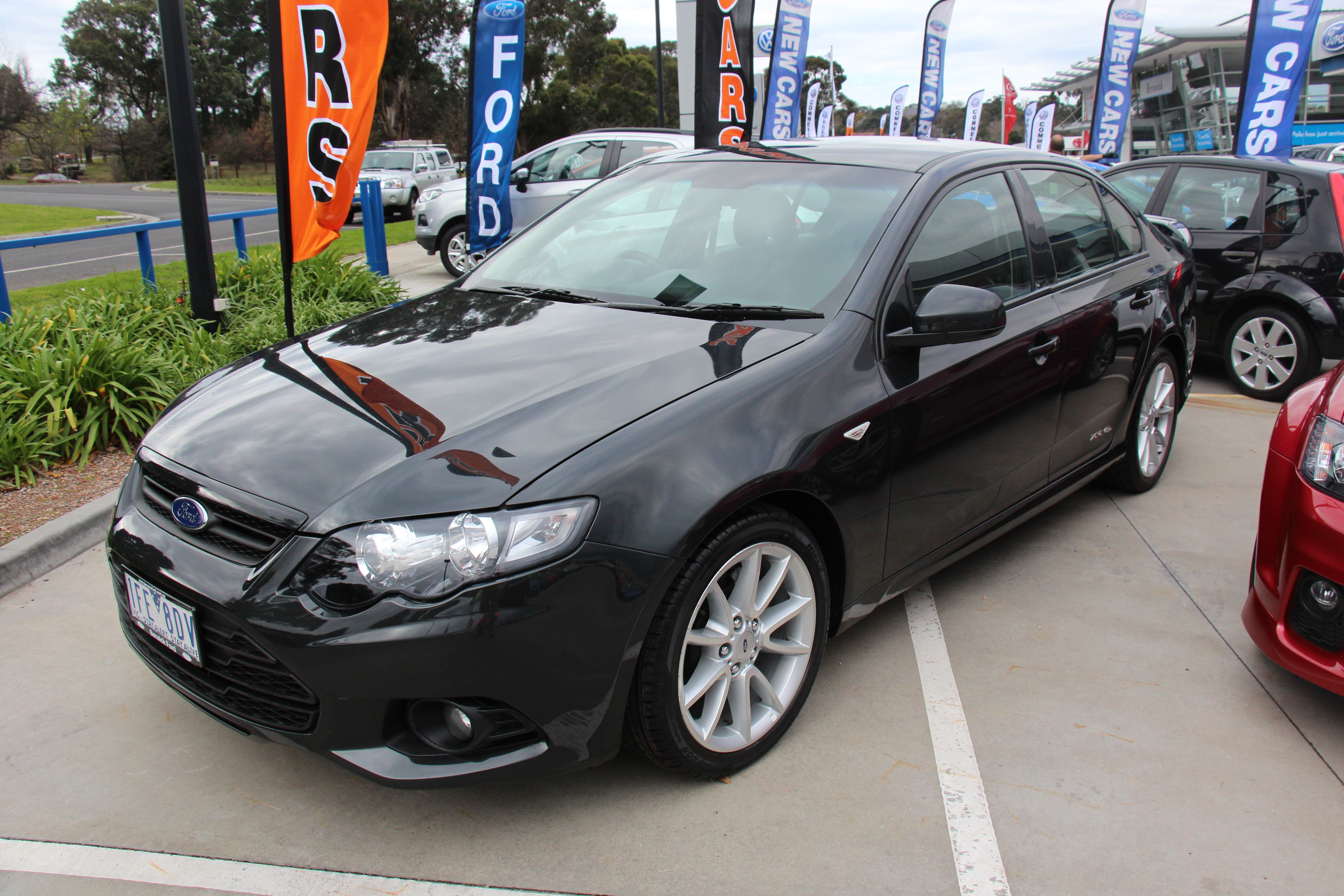
Ford Falcon XR6 (Mk II)

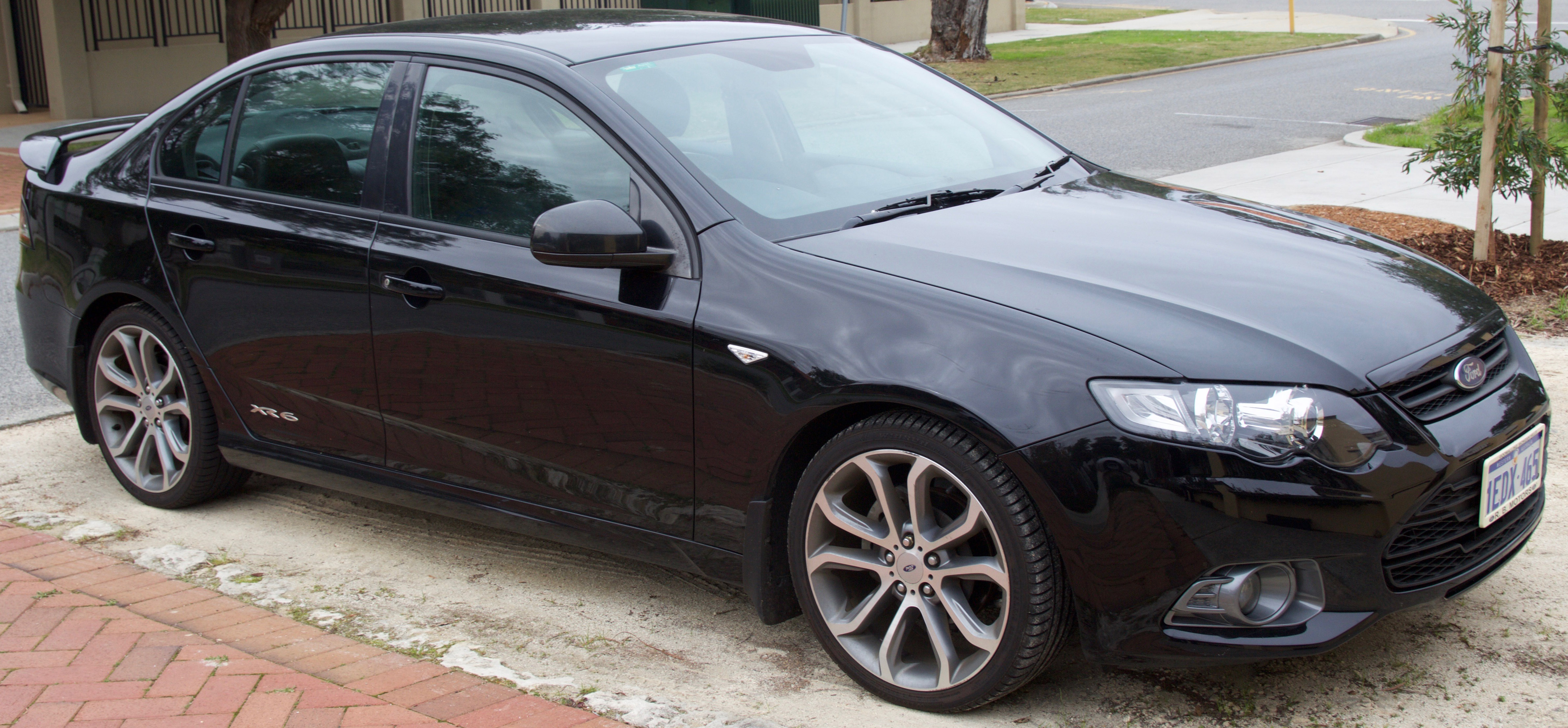
Ford Falcon XR6 Limited Edition (Mk II)

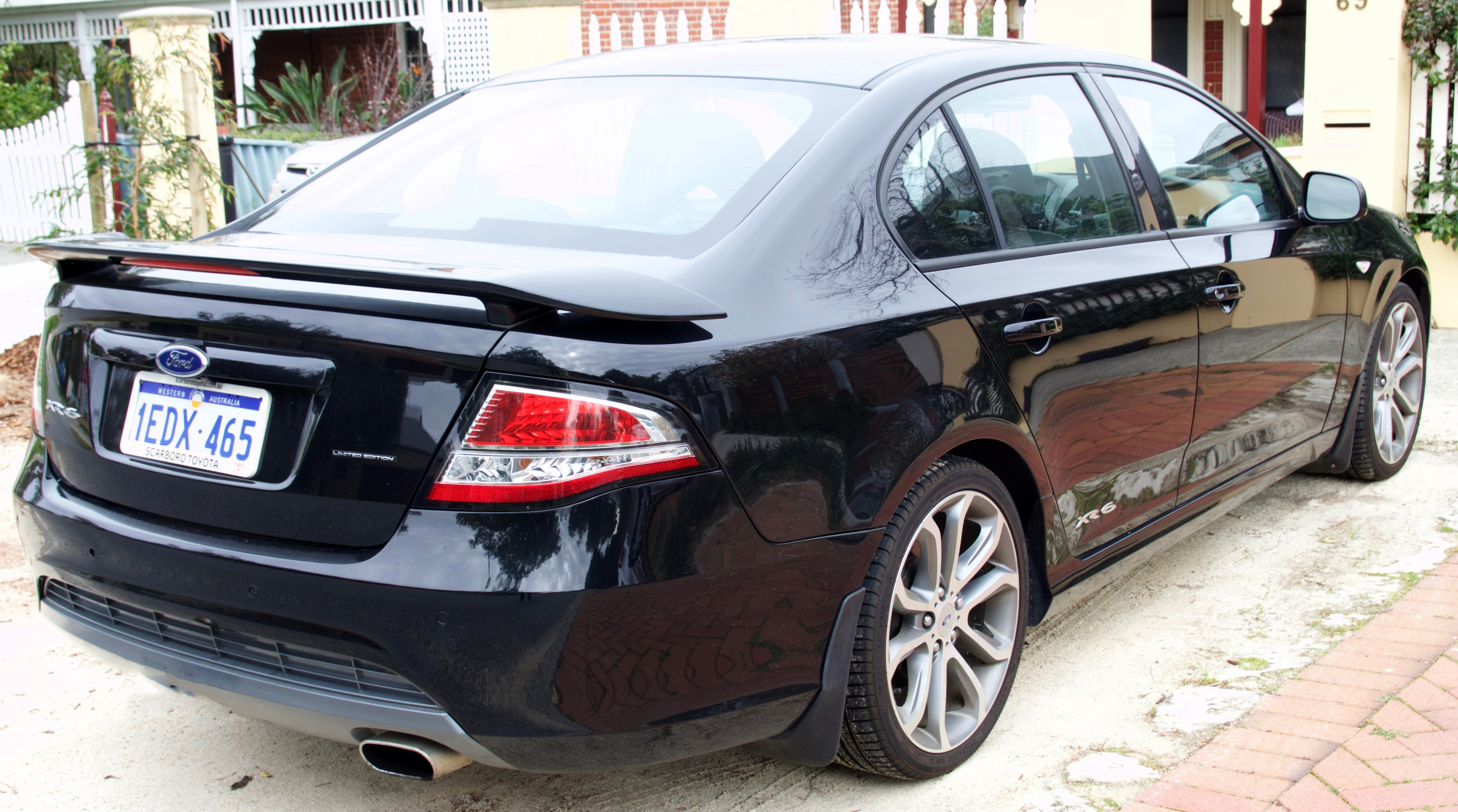
Ford Falcon XR6 Limited Edition (Mk II)

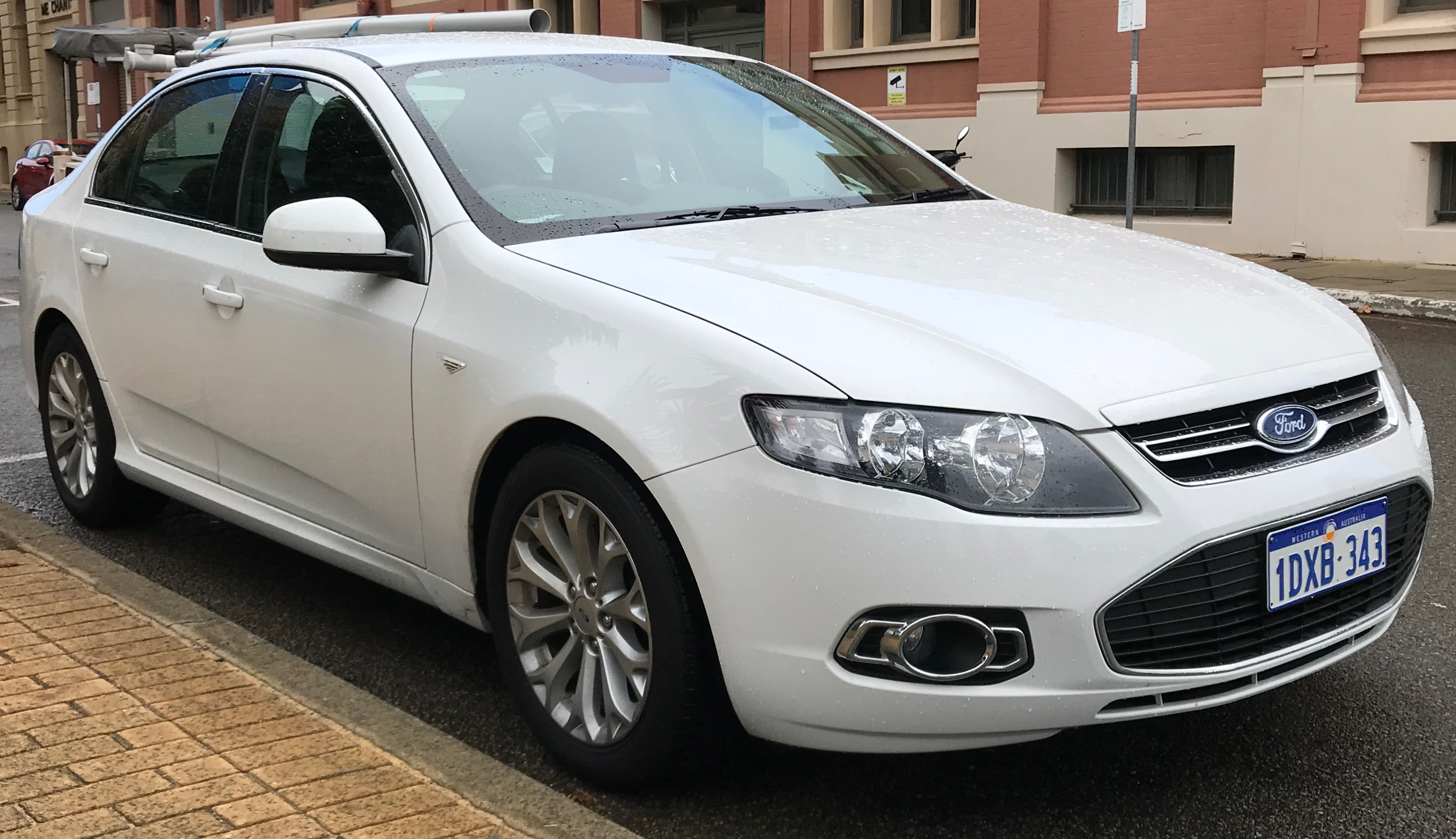
Ford Falcon G6 (Mk II)

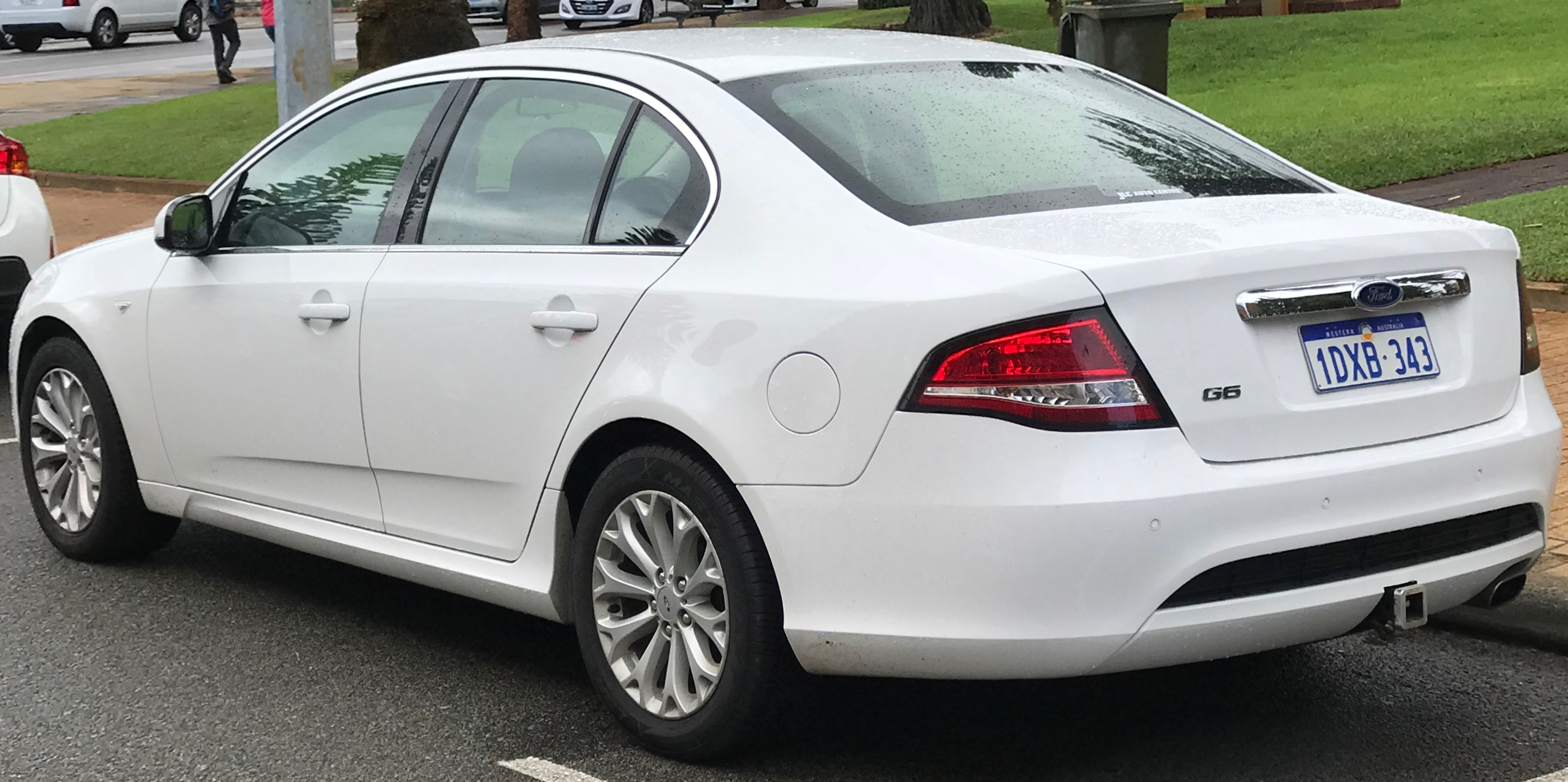
Ford Falcon G6 (Mk II)

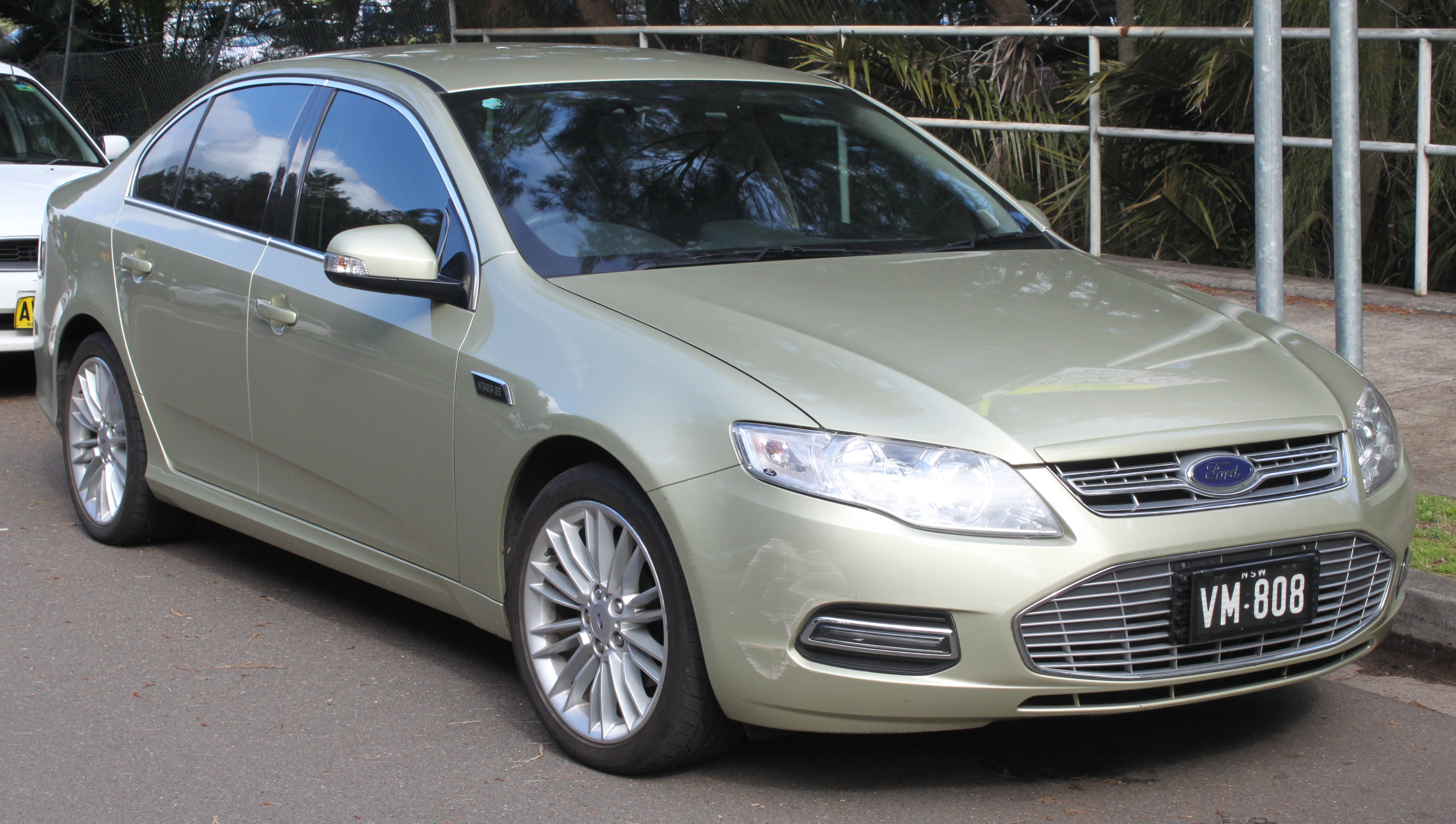
Ford Falcon G6E (Mk II)

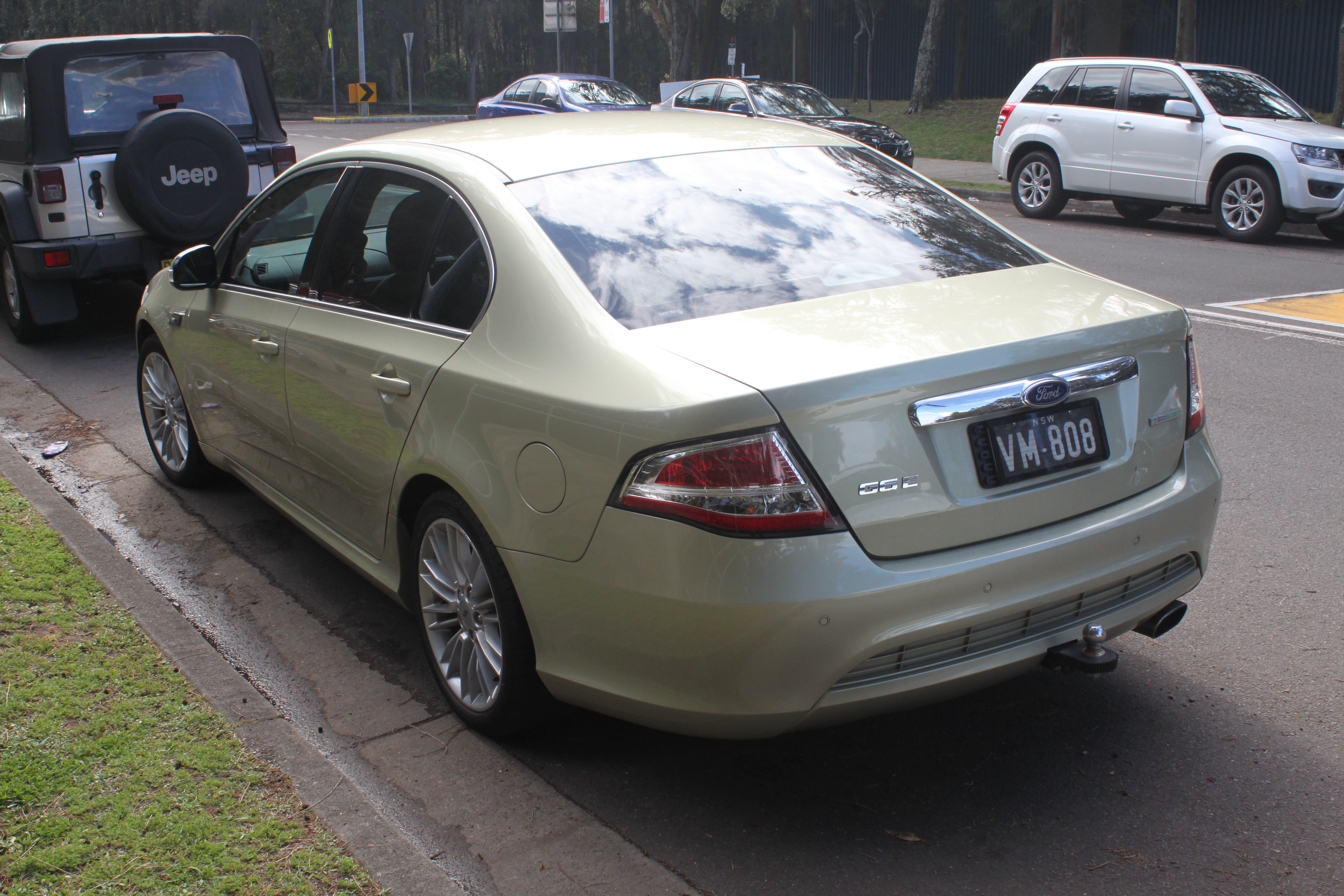
Ford Falcon G6E (Mk II)

== FPV range ==
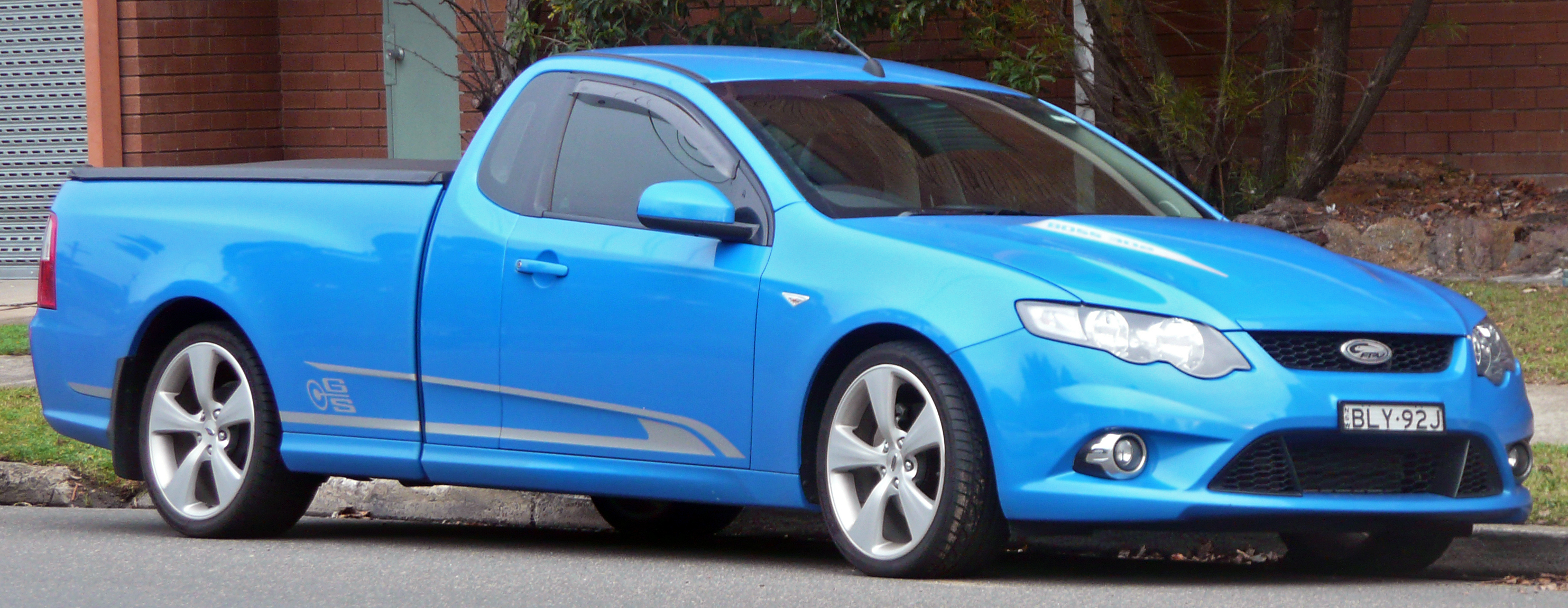
FPV FG GS Ute

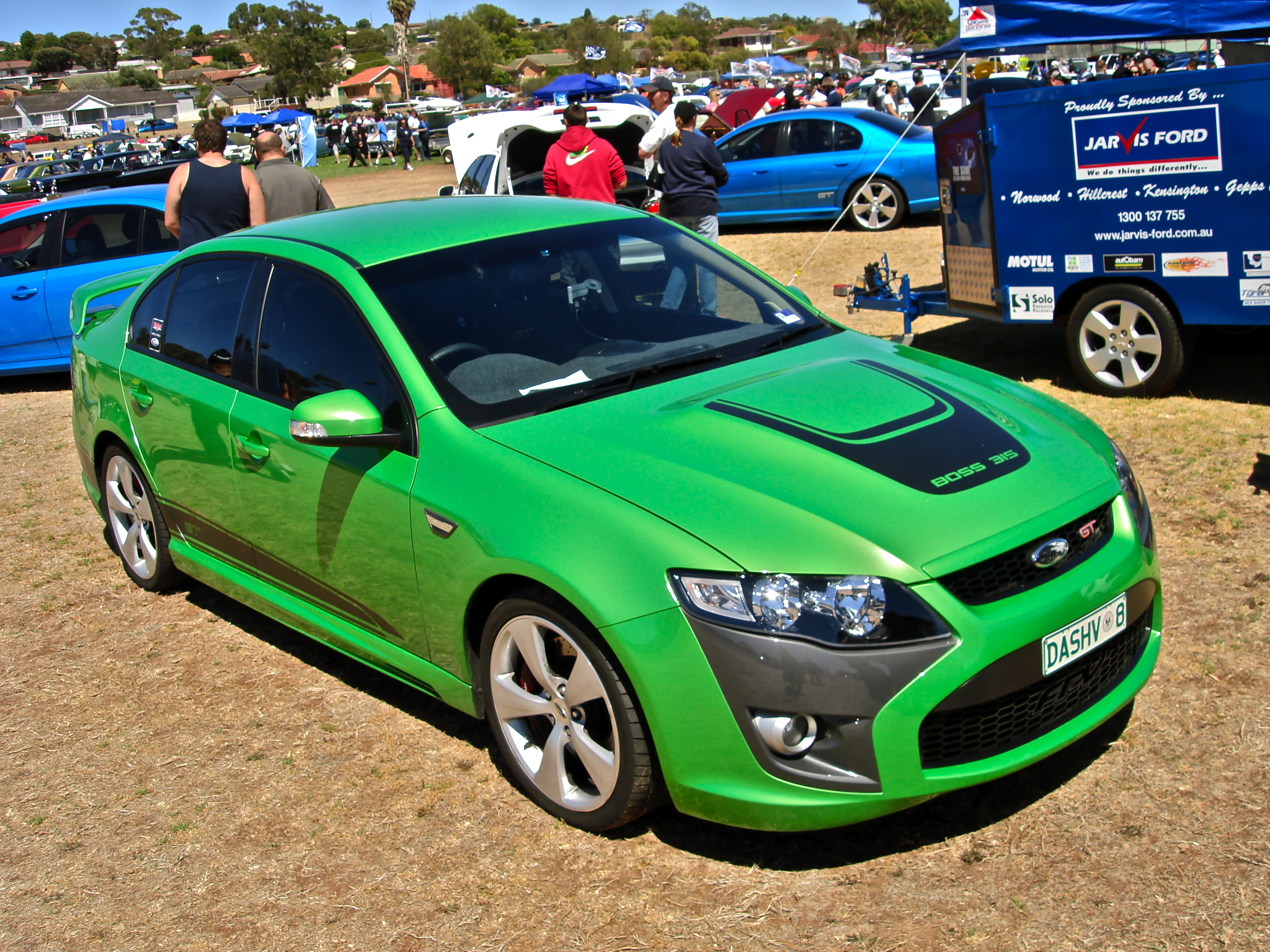
FPV FG GT Boss 315

As with the previous Falcon BA and BF series, Ford Performance Vehicles (FPV) produced high-performance versions of the Falcon FG. They included the F6 and V8-powered GT, GT-P, and GT E variants of the sedan, and the F6 Ute and V8-powered Pursuit and Super Pursuit models based on the Falcon Ute. The F6 models featured a 4.0 L, turbocharged DOHC 24-valve, I6 engine, which produced a maximum power of 310 kW (416 hp) at 5,500 rpm and maximum torque of 565 N⋅m (417 lb⋅ft) across the range from 1,950 to 5,200 rpm. All other models were powered by a 5.4 L Boss V8 engine, which produces 315 kW (422 hp) at 6,500 rpm and 551 N⋅m (406 lb⋅ft) of torque at 4,750 rpm. As of October 2009, FPV released a luxury F6-E model variant, which was equipped the same as a GT E, but with an F6 engine. Also in October 2009, FPV released a GS model to commemorate the historic GS nameplate from the 1970s, which was sold in lieu of a Falcon XR8. It was limited to 250 sedans and 75 utilities, and was powered by a detuned V8 from the GT. Its distinguishing exterior features included unique "GS" decals and dark argent wheels.

In October 2010, FPV introduced a supercharged, all-alloy, DOHC four valves per cylinder Coyote "Miami" 5.0 L; 302.1 cu in (4,951 cc) V8 engine to replace the older 5.4 L Boss unit. A 315 kW (422 hp) version was introduced in the FPV GS model (which replaces the defunct XR8 model) and a 335 kW (449 hp) version was developed for the FPV GT, GT E, and GT-P models.

Limited editions in this series included the Fifth-Anniversary, GT "Black", GT "R-Spec", and most importantly, the GT F "351". These cars had more powerful engines (335 kW (449 hp) for the first two and 351 kW (477 PS; 471 bhp) at 6000 rpm and 570 N⋅m (420 lbf⋅ft) at 2500-5500 rpm of torque for the GT F) and both the "R-Spec" and "351" also featured an enhanced handling package highlighted by wider 9-inch rear wheels. Further, the dynamometer testing showed that this engine makes significantly more power than the quoted 315, 335, 345, and 351 kW, figures in excess of 380-400 kW (510-535 hp) at the rear wheels or about 450-470 kW (600-630 hp) at the flywheel. They also introduced launch control and the "351" nomenclature of the GT F, which has become the "Final GT Falcon" ever, represents both its engine output and pays tribute to the original Falcon GT's cubic-inch displacement.
