= 2009 Perth 300 =

2009 Supercar Championship event

(Western Australia) 2009 BigPond 300
Event Information
- Round 13 of 14 in the 2009 V8 Supercar Championship Series
- Date: 20–22 November 2009
- Location: Perth, Western Australia
- Venue: Barbagallo Raceway
- Weather: Fine

Results
Race 1
Distance	42 laps	100 km
Pole position	Craig Lowndes; Triple Eight Race Engineering	57.1862
Winner	Jamie Whincup; Triple Eight Race Engineering	41:33.5350
Race 2
Distance	84 laps	200 km
Pole position	Jamie Whincup; Triple Eight Race Engineering	57.1146
Winner	Craig Lowndes; Triple Eight Race Engineering	1:27:42.4547

The 2009 Perth 300 (known for naming rights reasons as the 2009 BigPond 300) was the thirteenth round of the 2009 V8 Supercar Championship Series. It was the 34th ATCC/V8 Supercar event to be held at Barbagallo Raceway and was held on the weekend of 20 to 22 November in Perth, Western Australia.

The weekend was dominated by the Triple Eight Race Engineering duo of Craig Lowndes and Jamie Whincup. Lowndes claimed pole position for the first race of the weekend while Whincup claimed victory in the race itself. On Sunday, the roles were reversed with Whincup claiming pole position and Lowndes winning the race. The large points haul for Whincup put him within striking distance of retaining his championship with one round remaining.

== Background ==
The event was held on the weekend of 20 to 22 November 2009. It was the 34th ATCC/V8 Supercar event to be held at Barbagallo Raceway, and consisted of one 100 kilometre race held as Race 23 on Saturday, with a 200 kilometre race held on Sunday as Race 24.

=== Entry list ===
There were 29 drivers entered into this event. 18 drivers would compete in a VE Holden Commodore while ten drivers would utilise the FG Ford Falcon and one, Michael Patrizi of Paul Cruickshank Racing, would remain with the BF Ford Falcon.

=== Support categories ===
Category	Races	Round winner
Australian Mini Challenge	3	(Australia) Nathan Caratti (MINI Cooper S JCWR56)
Western Australian Formula Ford Championship	3	(Australia) Todd Fiore (Van Diemen RF)
Aussie Super 6 Series	3	(Australia) Grant Johnson (Holden Commodore (VT))
Formula Classic	3	(Australia) Michael Henderson (Ralt RT4)
Historic Touring Cars	3	(Australia) Paul Stubber (Chevrolet Camaro)

== Race report ==
=== Race 23 ===
==== Qualifying ====
Pos	No	Name	Team	Vehicle	Qual 1	Qual 2
1	1	(Australia) Jamie Whincup	Triple Eight Race Engineering	Ford Falcon (FG)		56.9288
2	7	(Australia) Todd Kelly	Kelly Racing	Holden Commodore (VE)		57.2013
3	2	(Australia) Garth Tander	Holden Racing Team	Holden Commodore (VE)		57.2192
4	22	(Australia) Will Davison	Holden Racing Team	Holden Commodore (VE)		57.2308
5	888	(Australia) Craig Lowndes	Triple Eight Race Engineering	Ford Falcon (FG)		57.2439
6	17	(Australia) Steven Johnson	Dick Johnson Racing	Ford Falcon (FG)		57.2445
7	39	(Australia) Russell Ingall	Paul Morris Motorsport	Holden Commodore (VE)		57.2819
8	5	(Australia) Mark Winterbottom	Ford Performance Racing	Ford Falcon (FG)		57.2948
9	18	(Australia) James Courtney	Dick Johnson Racing	Ford Falcon (FG)		57.3019
10	33	(Australia) Lee Holdsworth	Garry Rogers Motorsport	Holden Commodore (VE)		57.3316
11	15	(Australia) Rick Kelly	Kelly Racing	Holden Commodore (VE)		57.3585
12	24	(Australia) David Reynolds	Walkinshaw Racing	Holden Commodore (VE)		57.3589
13	25	(Australia) Jason Bright	Britek Motorsport	Ford Falcon (FG)		57.4287
14	34	(Australia) Michael Caruso	Garry Rogers Motorsport	Holden Commodore (VE)		57.4354
15	10	(Australia) Paul Dumbrell	Walkinshaw Racing	Holden Commodore (VE)		57.4395
16	6	(New Zealand) Steven Richards	Ford Performance Racing	Ford Falcon (FG)		57.4518
17	67	(Australia) Tim Slade	Paul Morris Motorsport	Holden Commodore (VE)		57.4566
18	111	(New Zealand) Fabian Coulthard	Paul Cruickshank Racing	Ford Falcon (FG)		57.5572
19	9	(New Zealand) Shane van Gisbergen	Stone Brothers Racing	Ford Falcon (FG)		57.6110
20	3	(Australia) Jason Bargwanna	Tasman Motorsport	Holden Commodore (VE)		57.6211
21	4	(Australia) Alex Davison	Stone Brothers Racing	Ford Falcon (FG)	57.4493	—N/a
22	51	(New Zealand) Greg Murphy	Tasman Motorsport	Holden Commodore (VE)	57.4583	—N/a
23	14	(Australia) Cameron McConville	Brad Jones Racing	Holden Commodore (VE)	57.5438	—N/a
24	12	(Australia) Dean Fiore	Triple F Racing	Holden Commodore (VE)	57.5547	—N/a
25	55	(Australia) Tony D'Alberto	Rod Nash Racing	Holden Commodore (VE)	57.6107	—N/a
26	11	(Australia) Jack Perkins	Kelly Racing	Holden Commodore (VE)	57.6263	—N/a
27	8	(New Zealand) Jason Richards	Brad Jones Racing	Holden Commodore (VE)	57.6864	—N/a
28	333	(Australia) Michael Patrizi	Paul Cruickshank Racing	Ford Falcon (BF)	58.0029	—N/a
29	16	(Australia) Mark McNally	Kelly Racing	Holden Commodore (VE)	58.3131	—N/a

==== Top ten shootout ====
Pos	No	Name	Team	Vehicle	Time
1	888	(Australia) Craig Lowndes	Triple Eight Race Engineering	Ford Falcon (FG)	57.1862
2	1	(Australia) Jamie Whincup	Triple Eight Race Engineering	Ford Falcon (FG)	57.1914
3	17	(Australia) Steven Johnson	Dick Johnson Racing	Ford Falcon (FG)	57.2446
4	22	(Australia) Will Davison	Holden Racing Team	Holden Commodore (VE)	57.2688
5	7	(Australia) Todd Kelly	Kelly Racing	Holden Commodore (VE)	57.3226
6	5	(Australia) Mark Winterbottom	Ford Performance Racing	Ford Falcon (FG)	57.3753
7	33	(Australia) Lee Holdsworth	Garry Rogers Motorsport	Holden Commodore (VE)	57.3938
8	2	(Australia) Garth Tander	Holden Racing Team	Holden Commodore (VE)	57.4571
9	39	(Australia) Russell Ingall	Paul Morris Motorsport	Holden Commodore (VE)	57.5289
10	18	(Australia) James Courtney	Dick Johnson Racing	Ford Falcon (FG)	57.7084

==== Race ====
Pos	No	Name	Team	Vehicle	Laps	Time/Retired	Grid
1	1	(Australia) Jamie Whincup	Triple Eight Race Engineering	Ford Falcon (FG)	42	41:33.5350	
2	7	(Australia) Todd Kelly	Kelly Racing	Holden Commodore (VE)	42		
3	5	(Australia) Mark Winterbottom	Ford Performance Racing	Ford Falcon (FG)	42		
4	18	(Australia) James Courtney	Dick Johnson Racing	Ford Falcon (FG)	42		
5	22	(Australia) Will Davison	Holden Racing Team	Holden Commodore (VE)	42		
6	888	(Australia) Craig Lowndes	Triple Eight Race Engineering	Ford Falcon (FG)	42		
7	15	(Australia) Rick Kelly	Kelly Racing	Holden Commodore (VE)	42		
8	51	(New Zealand) Greg Murphy	Tasman Motorsport	Holden Commodore (VE)	42		
9	39	(Australia) Russell Ingall	Paul Morris Motorsport	Holden Commodore (VE)	42		
10	17	(Australia) Steven Johnson	Dick Johnson Racing	Ford Falcon (FG)	42		
11	2	(Australia) Garth Tander	Holden Racing Team	Holden Commodore (VE)	42		
12	33	(Australia) Lee Holdsworth	Garry Rogers Motorsport	Holden Commodore (VE)	42		
13	111	(New Zealand) Fabian Coulthard	Paul Cruickshank Racing	Ford Falcon (FG)	42		
14	34	(Australia) Michael Caruso	Garry Rogers Motorsport	Holden Commodore (VE)	41	+ 1 lap	
15	9	(New Zealand) Shane van Gisbergen	Stone Brothers Racing	Ford Falcon (FG)	41	+ 1 lap	
16	10	(Australia) Paul Dumbrell	Walkinshaw Racing	Holden Commodore (VE)	41	+ 1 lap	
17	4	(Australia) Alex Davison	Stone Brothers Racing	Ford Falcon (FG)	41	+ 1 lap	
18	3	(Australia) Jason Bargwanna	Tasman Motorsport	Holden Commodore (VE)	41	+ 1 lap	
19	67	(Australia) Tim Slade	Paul Morris Motorsport	Holden Commodore (VE)	41	+ 1 lap	
20	8	(New Zealand) Jason Richards	Brad Jones Racing	Holden Commodore (VE)	41	+ 1 lap	
21	333	(Australia) Michael Patrizi	Paul Cruickshank Racing	Ford Falcon (BF)	41	+ 1 lap	
22	55	(Australia) Tony D'Alberto	Rod Nash Racing	Holden Commodore (VE)	41	+ 1 lap	
23	6	(New Zealand) Steven Richards	Ford Performance Racing	Ford Falcon (FG)	41	+ 1 lap	
24	25	(Australia) Jason Bright	Britek Motorsport	Ford Falcon (BF)	41	+ 1 lap	
25	14	(Australia) Cameron McConville	Brad Jones Racing	Holden Commodore (VE)	41	+ 1 lap	
26	11	(Australia) Jack Perkins	Kelly Racing	Holden Commodore (VE)	41	+ 1 lap	
27	16	(Australia) Mark McNally	Kelly Racing	Holden Commodore (VE)	41	+ 1 lap	
28	24	(Australia) David Reynolds	Walkinshaw Racing	Holden Commodore (VE)	40	+ 2 laps	
Ret	12	(Australia) Dean Fiore	Triple F Racing	Holden Commodore (VE)	36	Retired	
Fastest Lap: Rick Kelly (Kelly Racing) - 56.6498 on lap 3

=== Race 24 ===
==== Qualifying ====
Pos	No	Name	Team	Vehicle	Time
1	1	(Australia) Jamie Whincup	Triple Eight Race Engineering	Ford Falcon (FG)	57.1146
2	5	(Australia) Mark Winterbottom	Ford Performance Racing	Ford Falcon (FG)	57.2379
3	2	(Australia) Garth Tander	Holden Racing Team	Holden Commodore (VE)	57.3237
4	22	(Australia) Will Davison	Holden Racing Team	Holden Commodore (VE)	57.3660
5	15	(Australia) Rick Kelly	Kelly Racing	Holden Commodore (VE)	57.3715
6	111	(New Zealand) Fabian Coulthard	Paul Cruickshank Racing	Ford Falcon (FG)	57.4135
7	888	(Australia) Craig Lowndes	Triple Eight Race Engineering	Ford Falcon (FG)	57.4145
8	18	(Australia) James Courtney	Dick Johnson Racing	Ford Falcon (FG)	57.4283
9	17	(Australia) Steven Johnson	Dick Johnson Racing	Ford Falcon (FG)	57.4450
10	25	(Australia) Jason Bright	Britek Motorsport	Ford Falcon (FG)	57.5321
11	51	(New Zealand) Greg Murphy	Tasman Motorsport	Holden Commodore (VE)	57.5809
12	6	(New Zealand) Steven Richards	Ford Performance Racing	Ford Falcon (FG)	57.5987
13	7	(Australia) Todd Kelly	Kelly Racing	Holden Commodore (VE)	57.6077
14	39	(Australia) Russell Ingall	Paul Morris Motorsport	Holden Commodore (VE)	57.6388
15	33	(Australia) Lee Holdsworth	Garry Rogers Motorsport	Holden Commodore (VE)	57.6451
16	10	(Australia) Paul Dumbrell	Walkinshaw Racing	Holden Commodore (VE)	57.6549
17	4	(Australia) Alex Davison	Stone Brothers Racing	Ford Falcon (FG)	57.6588
18	11	(Australia) Jack Perkins	Kelly Racing	Holden Commodore (VE)	57.6729
19	67	(Australia) Tim Slade	Paul Morris Motorsport	Holden Commodore (VE)	57.6846
20	3	(Australia) Jason Bargwanna	Tasman Motorsport	Holden Commodore (VE)	57.7078
21	14	(Australia) Cameron McConville	Brad Jones Racing	Holden Commodore (VE)	57.7839
22	9	(New Zealand) Shane van Gisbergen	Stone Brothers Racing	Ford Falcon (FG)	57.7908
23	333	(Australia) Michael Patrizi	Paul Cruickshank Racing	Ford Falcon (BF)	57.8004
24	24	(Australia) David Reynolds	Walkinshaw Racing	Holden Commodore (VE)	57.8771
25	55	(Australia) Tony D'Alberto	Rod Nash Racing	Holden Commodore (VE)	57.8982
26	12	(Australia) Dean Fiore	Triple F Racing	Holden Commodore (VE)	57.9055
27	34	(Australia) Michael Caruso	Garry Rogers Motorsport	Holden Commodore (VE)	57.9463
28	8	(New Zealand) Jason Richards	Brad Jones Racing	Holden Commodore (VE)	58.1023
29	16	(Australia) Mark McNally	Kelly Racing	Holden Commodore (VE)	58.4412

==== Race ====
Pos	No	Name	Team	Vehicle	Laps	Time/Retired	Grid
1	888	(Australia) Craig Lowndes	Triple Eight Race Engineering	Ford Falcon (FG)	84	01:27:42.4547	
2	17	(Australia) Steven Johnson	Dick Johnson Racing	Ford Falcon (FG)	84		
3	2	(Australia) Garth Tander	Holden Racing Team	Holden Commodore (VE)	84		
4	1	(Australia) Jamie Whincup	Triple Eight Race Engineering	Ford Falcon (FG)	84		
5	39	(Australia) Russell Ingall	Paul Morris Motorsport	Holden Commodore (VE)	84		
6	25	(Australia) Jason Bright	Britek Motorsport	Ford Falcon (BF)	84		
7	3	(Australia) Jason Bargwanna	Tasman Motorsport	Holden Commodore (VE)	84		
8	6	(New Zealand) Steven Richards	Ford Performance Racing	Ford Falcon (FG)	84		
9	14	(Australia) Cameron McConville	Brad Jones Racing	Holden Commodore (VE)	84		
10	18	(Australia) James Courtney	Dick Johnson Racing	Ford Falcon (FG)	84		
11	111	(New Zealand) Fabian Coulthard	Paul Cruickshank Racing	Ford Falcon (FG)	84		
12	10	(Australia) Paul Dumbrell	Walkinshaw Racing	Holden Commodore (VE)	84		
13	9	(New Zealand) Shane van Gisbergen	Stone Brothers Racing	Ford Falcon (FG)	84		
14	8	(New Zealand) Jason Richards	Brad Jones Racing	Holden Commodore (VE)	84		
15	24	(Australia) David Reynolds	Walkinshaw Racing	Holden Commodore (VE)	84		
16	15	(Australia) Rick Kelly	Kelly Racing	Holden Commodore (VE)	84		
17	5	(Australia) Mark Winterbottom	Ford Performance Racing	Ford Falcon (FG)	84		
18	34	(Australia) Michael Caruso	Garry Rogers Motorsport	Holden Commodore (VE)	84		
19	51	(New Zealand) Greg Murphy	Tasman Motorsport	Holden Commodore (VE)	84		
20	12	(Australia) Dean Fiore	Triple F Racing	Holden Commodore (VE)	83	+ 1 lap	
21	4	(Australia) Alex Davison	Stone Brothers Racing	Ford Falcon (FG)	83	+ 1 lap	
22	67	(Australia) Tim Slade	Paul Morris Motorsport	Holden Commodore (VE)	83	+ 1 lap	
23	55	(Australia) Tony D'Alberto	Rod Nash Racing	Holden Commodore (VE)	83	+ 1 lap	
24	11	(Australia) Jack Perkins	Kelly Racing	Holden Commodore (VE)	83	+ 1 lap	
25	16	(Australia) Mark McNally	Kelly Racing	Holden Commodore (VE)	82	+ 2 laps	
Ret	22	(Australia) Will Davison	Holden Racing Team	Holden Commodore (VE)	41	Retired	
Ret	33	(Australia) Lee Holdsworth	Garry Rogers Motorsport	Holden Commodore (VE)	39	Retired	
Ret	7	(Australia) Todd Kelly	Kelly Racing	Holden Commodore (VE)	38	Retired	
Ret	333	(Australia) Michael Patrizi	Paul Cruickshank Racing	Ford Falcon (BF)	29	Retired	
Fastest Lap: Michael Caruso (Garry Rogers Motorsport) - 57.3380 on lap 48

== Championship standings ==
- After Race 24 of 26

Pos	No	Name	Team	Points
1	1	Jamie Whincup	Team Vodafone	3175
2	22	Will Davison	Toll Holden Racing Team	2894
3	2	Garth Tander	Toll Holden Racing Team	2766
4	888	Craig Lowndes	Team Vodafone	2544
5	17	Steven Johnson	Jim Beam Racing	2177
