= 2006 Australian Formula Ford Championship =

Motor racing competition

Seasons
- ← 2005 2007 →

The 2006 Australian Formula Ford Championship was an Australian motor racing competition for racing cars complying with Formula Ford regulations as published by the Confederation of Australian Motor Sport (CAMS). It was recognised by CAMS as a National Championship. The championship was the 37th national series for Formula Fords to be held in Australia and the 14th to carry the Australian Formula Ford Championship name.

The championship was won by John Martin driving a Spectrum 011 Ford.

== Teams and drivers ==
Team	Chassis	No	Driver	Rounds
Sonic Motor Racing Services	Van Diemen RF04	3	(Australia) Tim Slade	All
Sonic Motor Racing Services	Van Diemen RF04	4	(Australia) Todd Fiore	All
Sonic Motor Racing Services	Van Diemen RF04	5	(Australia) Tim Blanchard	All
Borland Racing Developments	Spectrum 011	8	(Australia) Kristian Lindbom	7–8
Borland Racing Developments	Spectrum 011	24	(Australia) John Martin	All
Borland Racing Developments	Spectrum 011	71	(Australia) Paul Laskazeski	1–2, 6–8
John Mostyn Racing	Spectrum 011	10	(Australia) John Mostyn	1–2
John Mostyn Racing	Spectrum 011	25	(Australia) Daniel Cotton	3, 8
Team Spirit	Spirit WL06	11	(Australia) Joel Spychala	1–6
JB Motorsport	Van Diemen RF06	13	(Australia) James Bergmuller	1, 3–6, 8
Doulman Industries Racing	Spirit WL06	15	(Australia) Grant Doulman	All
VIP Petfoods	Van Diemen RF06	16	(Australia) Sam Sewell	1–6
VIP Petfoods	Van Diemen RF06	45	(Australia) Ashley Walsh	All
Anglo Australian Motorsport	Spirit WL06	17	(Australia) Luke Wood	4
Anglo Australian Motorsport	Spectrum 011	41	(Australia) Brad Lowe	All
Team BRM	Van Diemen RF06	20	(Australia) Shane Wright	1
Team BRM	Van Diemen RF06	20	(Australia) John Magro	6
Team BRM	Van Diemen RF06	21	(United Kingdom) Ben Clucas	1
Team BRM	Van Diemen RF06	21	(Australia) Kain Magro	6
JagMag	Van Diemen RF04	23	(Australia) Tristan Hughes	1–3
Fastlane Racing	Van Diemen RF04	32	(Australia) Nathan Caratti	All
Fastlane Racing	Van Diemen RF05	46	(Australia) Dale Wood	1–3
Fastlane Racing	Mygale SJ06	46	(Australia) Dale Wood	4–8
Escalate Management	Van Diemen RF06	37	(Australia) Tony LeMessurier	All
Toshiba Mobile Computers	Van Diemen RF03	42	(Australia) Samantha Reid	All
Nomad Racing	Van Diemen RF05	74	(Australia) Mark McNally	1–2
King Racing	Spectrum 011	89	(Australia) Joshua Scott	1–7
Minda Motorsport	Van Diemen RF05	92	(Australia) Taz Douglas	5

== Calendar ==
The title was contested over an eight-round series with three races per round.

Round	Circuit	Dates	Supporting	Map
1	(South Australia) Adelaide Street Circuit	23–26 March	V8 Supercar Championship Series	2006 Australian Formula Ford Championship is located in Australia
2	(Western Australia) Wanneroo Raceway	12–14 May	V8 Supercar Championship Series	2006 Australian Formula Ford Championship is located in Australia
3	Queensland Raceway	21–23 July	V8 Supercar Championship Series	2006 Australian Formula Ford Championship is located in Australia
4	(New South Wales) Oran Park Raceway	11–13 August	V8 Supercar Championship Series	2006 Australian Formula Ford Championship is located in Australia
5	(Victoria (state)) Sandown Raceway	1–3 September	V8 Supercar Championship Series	2006 Australian Formula Ford Championship is located in Australia
6	(South Australia) Mallala Motor Sport Park	15–17 September	Fujitsu V8 Supercar Series	2006 Australian Formula Ford Championship is located in Australia
7	(Tasmania) Symmons Plains Raceway	10–12 November	V8 Supercar Championship Series	2006 Australian Formula Ford Championship is located in Australia
8	(Victoria (state)) Phillip Island Grand Prix Circuit	8–10 December	V8 Supercar Championship Series	2006 Australian Formula Ford Championship is located in Australia

== Season summary ==
Rd	Race	Circuit	Pole position	Fastest lap	Winning driver	Winning team	Round Winner
1	1	(South Australia) Adelaide Street Circuit	(Australia) Paul Laskazeski	(Australia) Tim Slade	(Australia) Tim Slade	Sonic Motor Racing Services	(Australia) John Martin
1	2	(South Australia) Adelaide Street Circuit		(Australia) Tim Slade	(Australia) John Martin	Borland Racing Developments	(Australia) John Martin
1	3	(South Australia) Adelaide Street Circuit		(Australia) John Martin	(Australia) John Martin	Borland Racing Developments	(Australia) John Martin
2	1	(Western Australia) Wanneroo Raceway	(Australia) Ashley Walsh	(Australia) Tim Slade	(Australia) Ashley Walsh	VIP Petfoods	(Australia) Todd Fiore
2	2	(Western Australia) Wanneroo Raceway		(Australia) Ashley Walsh	(Australia) Todd Fiore	Sonic Motor Racing Services	(Australia) Todd Fiore
2	3	(Western Australia) Wanneroo Raceway		(Australia) Grant Doulman	(Australia) Todd Fiore	Sonic Motor Racing Services	(Australia) Todd Fiore
3	1	Queensland Raceway	(Australia) Todd Fiore	(Australia) Ashley Walsh	(Australia) Tim Slade	Sonic Motor Racing Services	(Australia) Tim Slade
3	2	Queensland Raceway		(Australia) Tim Slade	(Australia) Tim Slade	Sonic Motor Racing Services	(Australia) Tim Slade
3	3	Queensland Raceway		(Australia) John Martin	(Australia) Joshua Scott	King Racing	(Australia) Tim Slade
4	1	(New South Wales) Oran Park Raceway	(Australia) Grant Doulman	(Australia) John Martin	(Australia) John Martin	Borland Racing Developments	(Australia) Dale Wood
4	2	(New South Wales) Oran Park Raceway		(Australia) Joshua Scott	(Australia) John Martin	Borland Racing Developments	(Australia) Dale Wood
4	3	(New South Wales) Oran Park Raceway		(Australia) Dale Wood	(Australia) Dale Wood	Fastlane Racing	(Australia) Dale Wood
5	1	(Victoria (state)) Sandown Raceway	(Australia) Tim Slade	(Australia) Tim Blanchard	(Australia) John Martin	Borland Racing Developments	(Australia) John Martin
5	2	(Victoria (state)) Sandown Raceway		(Australia) Tim Slade	(Australia) Ashley Walsh	VIP Petfoods	(Australia) John Martin
5	3	(Victoria (state)) Sandown Raceway		(Australia) John Martin	(Australia) John Martin	Borland Racing Developments	(Australia) John Martin
6	1	(South Australia) Mallala Motor Sport Park	(Australia) Tim Slade	(Australia) Tim Slade	(Australia) Ashley Walsh	VIP Petfoods	(Australia) Tim Slade
6	2	(South Australia) Mallala Motor Sport Park		(Australia) John Martin	(Australia) Tim Slade	Sonic Motor Racing Services	(Australia) Tim Slade
6	3	(South Australia) Mallala Motor Sport Park		(Australia) John Martin	(Australia) Tim Slade	Sonic Motor Racing Services	(Australia) Tim Slade
7	1	(Tasmania) Symmons Plains Raceway	(Australia) Tim Slade	(Australia) Joshua Scott	(Australia) John Martin	Borland Racing Developments	(Australia) Dale Wood
7	2	(Tasmania) Symmons Plains Raceway		(Australia) Tim Slade	(Australia) Dale Wood	Fastlane Racing	(Australia) Dale Wood
7	3	(Tasmania) Symmons Plains Raceway		(Australia) John Martin	(Australia) Paul Laskazeski	Borland Racing Developments	(Australia) Dale Wood
8	1	(Victoria (state)) Phillip Island Grand Prix Circuit	(Australia) Joshua Scott	(Australia) Tim Slade	(Australia) Joshua Scott	King Racing	(Australia) Ashley Walsh
8	2	(Victoria (state)) Phillip Island Grand Prix Circuit		(Australia) Joshua Scott	(Australia) John Martin	Borland Racing Developments	(Australia) Ashley Walsh
8	3	(Victoria (state)) Phillip Island Grand Prix Circuit		(Australia) Ashley Walsh	(Australia) Ashley Walsh	VIP Petfoods	(Australia) Ashley Walsh

== Points system ==
Championship points were awarded on a 20-16-14-12-10-8-6-4-2-1 basis to the top ten classified finishers in each race. An additional point was awarded to the driver gaining pole position for each round.

== Drivers' championship standings ==
Pos.	Driver	(South Australia) ADE			(Western Australia) WAN			(Queensland) QUE			(New South Wales) ORA			(Victoria (state)) SAN			(South Australia) MAL			(Tasmania) SYM			(Victoria (state)) PHI			Pts
Pos.	Driver	R1	R2	R3	R1	R2	R3	R1	R2	R3	R1	R2	R3	R1	R2	R3	R1	R2	R3	R1	R2	R3	R1	R2	R3	Pts
1	(Australia) John Martin	4	1	1	4	4	3	6	4	3	1	1	4	1	Ret	1	8	15	6	1	Ret	5	3	1	5	300
2	(Australia) Tim Slade	1	12	2	12	7	5	1	1	2	4	3	2	Ret	4	3	3	1	1	4	2	Ret	4	8	9	279
3	(Australia) Ashley Walsh	Ret	7	Ret	1	15	7	4	8	4	5	5	Ret	6	1	5	1	6	5	3	3	Ret	2	6	1	229
4	(Australia) Todd Fiore	9	4	3	3	1	1	2	2	5	8	12	8	Ret	6	11	7	7	10	Ret	Ret	8	7	3	3	192
5	(Australia) Tim Blanchard	DSQ	13	7	5	3	4	5	5	6	9	Ret	9	2	11	8	4	2	2	7	8	4	5	Ret	2	186
6	(Australia) Dale Wood	Ret	8	5	Ret	11	11	Ret	12	7	2	2	1	5	3	2	Ret	9	8	5	1	2	6	Ret	5	182
7	(Australia) Nathan Caratti	5	3	Ret	2	2	2	7	13	10	6	6	6	Ret	Ret	10	2	4	4	Ret	Ret	9	Ret	7	Ret	152
8	(Australia) Brad Lowe	Ret	16	11	8	5	6	10	7	Ret	7	Ret	7	4	2	7	5	5	3	Ret	10	3	8	4	7	146
9	(Australia) Joshua Scott	Ret	Ret	Ret	Ret	9	19	3	3	1	Ret	7	3	3	12	4	9	8	14	6	5	10	1	14	Ret	142
10	(Australia) Paul Laskazeski	2	Ret	4	7	6	8										10	10	9	2	6	1	9	2	8	117
11	(Australia) Joel Spychala	14	6	6	Ret	12	15	8	Ret	DNS	3	4	5	9	Ret	13	6	3	7							86
12	(Australia) Grant Doulman	Ret	10	8	11	18	12	15	10	8	Ret	8	Ret	8	5	9	16	16	13	8	4	7	10	9	12	56
13	(Australia) Kristian Lindbom																			Ret	9	6	Ret	5	4	32
14	(United Kingdom) Ben Clucas	3	2	12																						30
15	(Australia) John Mostyn	7	5	10	9	8	10																			24
16	(Australia) Sam Sewell	8	Ret	14	10	10	9	12	6	14	Ret	Ret	12	7	Ret	Ret	12	11	12							22
17	(Australia) Taz Douglas													Ret	7	6										14
18	(Australia) Samantha Reid	10	9	13	14	14	14	13	14	11	12	9	13	Ret	10	12	Ret	DNS	Ret	10	7	11	12	12	Ret	13
19	(Australia) Mark McNally	Ret	14	9	6	13	16																			10
=	(Australia) Tristan Hughes	6	11	Ret	13	17	13																			10
21	(Australia) James Bergmuller	12	15	16				11	11	13	10	10	11	10	9	Ret	14	12	15				11	10	10	7
22	(Australia) Tony LeMessurier	11	Ret	Ret	15	16	17	14	15	15	13	11	14	11	8	Ret	13	Ret	Ret	9	11	12	13	13	11	6
23	(Australia) Daniel Cotton							9	Ret	9													Ret	11	Ret	4
24	(Australia) Luke Wood										11	Ret	10													1
-	(Australia) Shane Wright	13	Ret	15																						0
-	(Australia) John Magro																11	14	11							0
-	(Australia) Kain Magro																15	13	Ret							0
Pos.	Driver	(South Australia) ADE			(Western Australia) WAN			(Queensland) QUE			(New South Wales) ORA			(Victoria (state)) SAN			(South Australia) MAL			(Tasmania) SYM			(Victoria (state)) PHI			Pts

Note: The 1600cc Ford “Duratec” engine as used in the Ford Fiesta was introduced for the 2006 championship, replacing the Ford “Kent” engine that had been mandatory for Formula Ford in Australia for over 30 years.
