= Tim Blanchard =

Australian racing driver

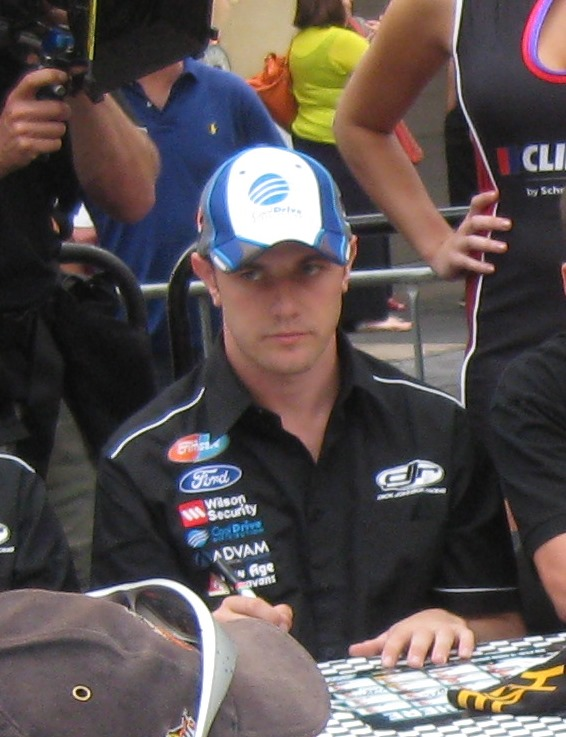
- Blanchard in 2013
- Nationality: Australian
- Born: Timothy William John Blanchard; 30 June 1987 (age 39) Melbourne, Victoria
- Relatives: John Blanchard (father)
- Categorisation: FIA Silver

Supercars Championship career
- Championships: 0
- Races: 182
- Wins: 0
- Podiums: 0
- Pole positions: 0
- 2021 position: 35th (168 pts)

Timothy William John Blanchard (born 30 June 1987) is an Australian racing driver, who has raced in the premier Motorsport series in Australia, the Supercars Championship. Blanchard is the co-team principal of his family owned Supercars team, Blanchard Racing Team.

Blanchard has raced in several other motor racing series, including the British Formula Ford Championship, and was the winner of the 2007 Australian Formula Ford Championship.

== Early career ==
=== Karting ===
Blanchard raced in various classes throughout his karting career, resulting in numerous titles. His final two years were particularly notable, taking out all before him in a dominant two years for the young Victorian. 2003 saw Blanchard take out the Victorian Junior National Heavy Title before winning the Australian Junior National Heavy Title in the National Sprint Kart Championships at Ipswich Kart Raceway, Ipswich, QLD. This was another successful year for Tim as he looked to move into the senior class after taking both junior titles on offer. In the 2004 season, Blanchard took out the Victorian Senior National Heavy Title before winning the Australian Title at Hume International Raceway in Puckapunyal. This would prove to be his final year in karts as a foray into Formula Ford awaited.

=== Formula Ford ===
==== Australia ====
Blanchard progressed into Formula Ford in 2005, participating in both the Australian and Victoria State Championships in his first season. He finished third in the Victorian Series, however only entering three races in the Australian Championship as he gathered much-needed experience in the open wheeler class.

Blanchard turned his concentration fully onto the Australian Championship in 2006, and under the guidance of Sonic Motor Racing Services, finished the season with 186 points and five podiums, resulting in a fifth place in the championship. 2007 saw Blanchard have his biggest success to date when he took out the Australian Formula Ford Championship with seven wins and sixteen podiums from the twenty-four race series.

==== UK ====
After winning the 2007 Australian Formula Ford Championship, Blanchard set his sights on conquering the British Formula Ford Championship, a series with a rich history, and a proving ground for many of the biggest names in motorsport. Blanchard signed with Jamun Racing Services, one of the most successful teams in British Formula Ford, and together with his teammate Wayne Boyd, set about dominating the championship. With three race wins, 16 podiums and five poles, Blanchard finished the 2008 British Formula Ford Championship in second place, 50 points behind his teammate Wayne Boyd. This was another breakout year for Blanchard, culminating in a third-place finish at the season-ending Formula Ford Festival. His mechanic for the season was Scott Malvern who went on to be a successful racing driver in his own right winning the British Formula Ford Championship and Formula Ford Festival with Jamun in 2011.

Due to funding shortfalls after the 2008 financial crisis, Blanchard was unable to secure a drive for the 2009 season. Tim instead concentrated his efforts on completing his accounting degree at Swinburne University whilst also assisting a number of teams in both V8s and Formula Ford throughout the season.

== Supercars ==
=== Development Series ===
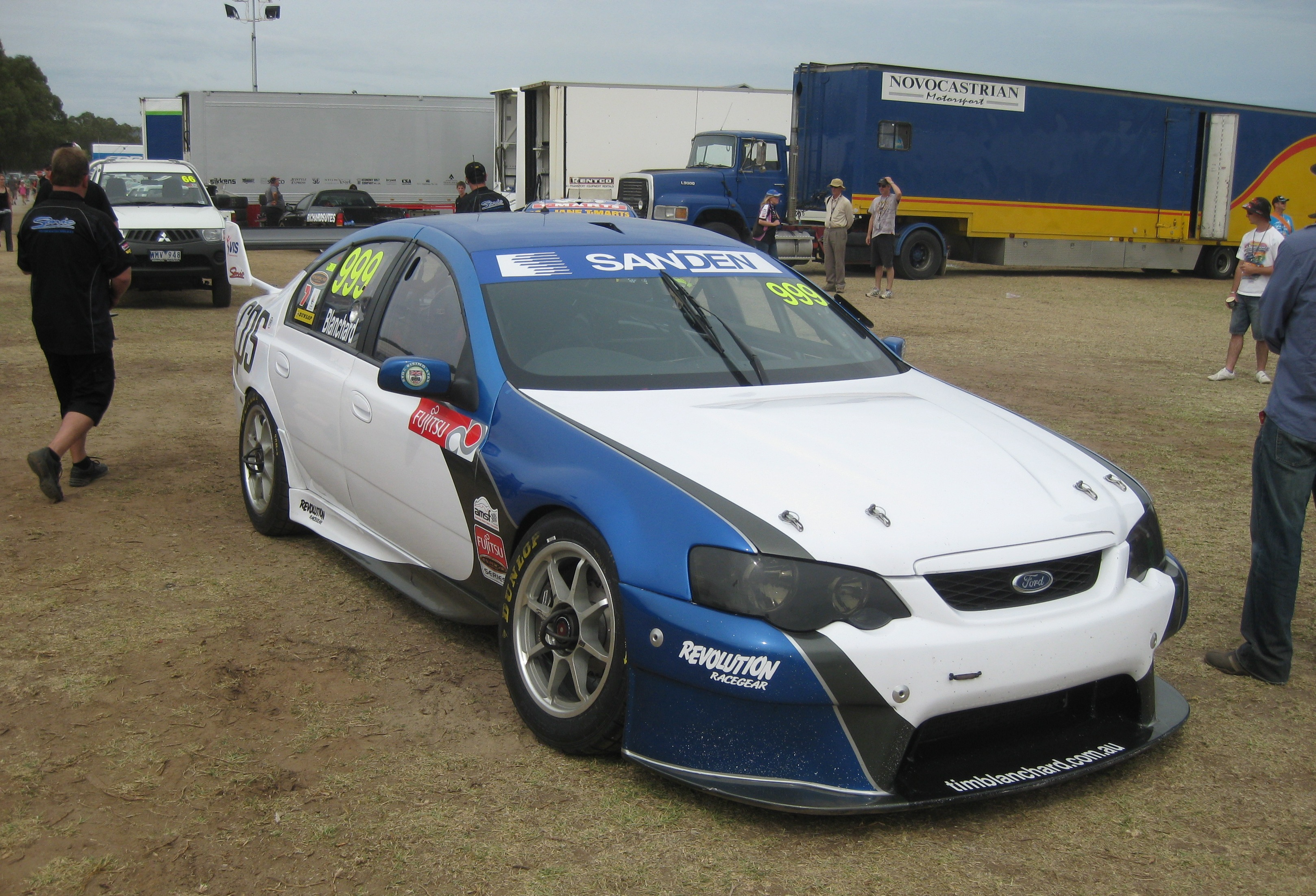
Blanchard placed second in the 2010 Fujitsu V8 Supercar Series driving a Ford Falcon BF for Sonic Motor Racing Services

In 2010, Blanchard reunited with Sonic Motor Racing Services for the 2010 Fujitsu V8 Supercar Series. Blanchard drove the ex-Triple Eight Falcon BF that James Moffat drove in the 2009 Fujitsu V8 Series. Following a season in the wilderness, Blanchard took no time to settle, finishing fifth in both races at the 2010 Clipsal 500. His standout performance came in Round 4 at the 2010 Sucrogen Townsville 400, winning the round with two podiums including his first race win. Consistency was the key throughout the season, as Blanchard finished 2nd in the 2010 Fujitsu V8 Supercar Series.

Following the 2010 Fujitsu V8 Supercar Series, Blanchard collected the coveted Mike Kable Young Gun Award.

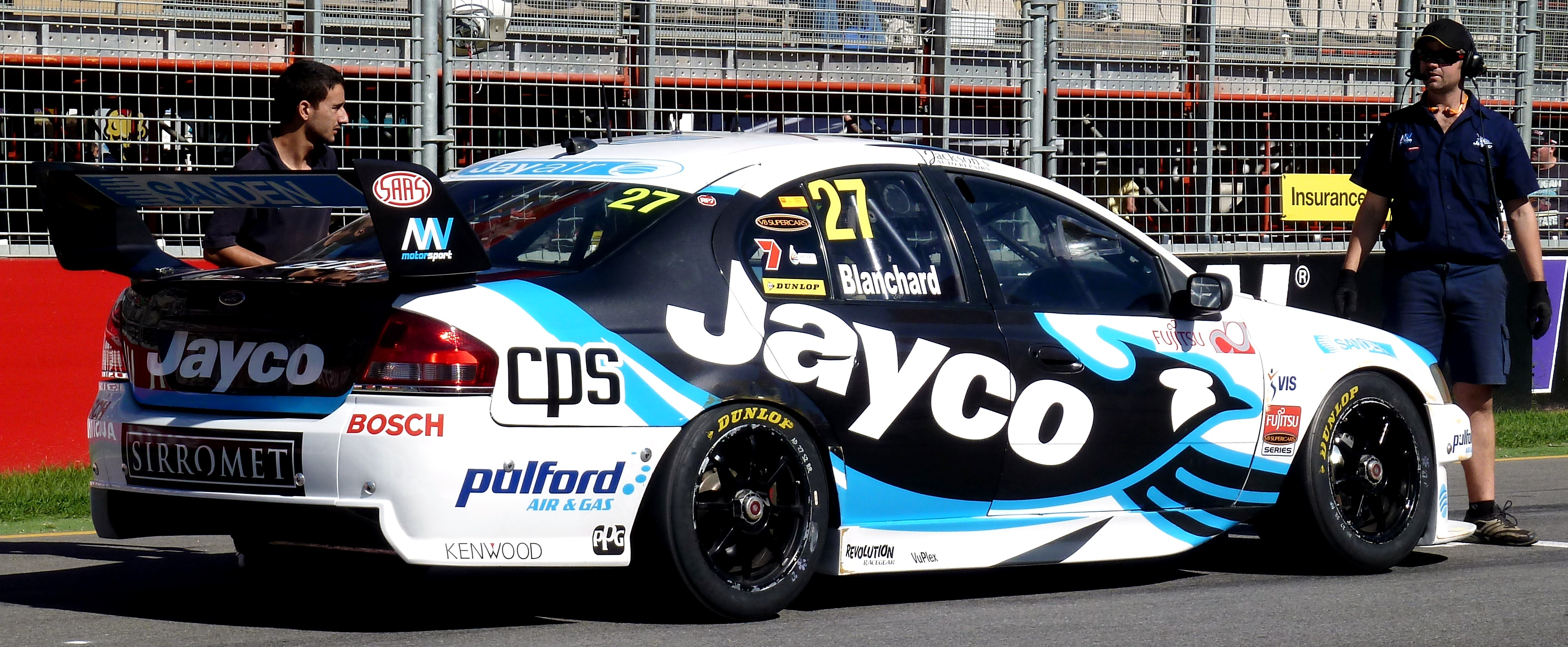
Blanchard's Jayco Ford BF Falcon at the Clipsal 500, 19 March 2011.

2011 saw Blanchard sign with MW Motorsport to team up with the experienced David Russell in the Team Jayco BF Falcons. Blanchard drove the ex-FPR Falcon BF that Tony Bates drove in the 2010 Fujitsu V8 Supercar Series. After a successful year with Sonic Motor Racing Services, Blanchard started off the season at MW Motorsport with his best result for the year, finishing second in the opening round of the 2011 Fujitsu V8 Supercar Series at the 2011 Clipsal 500. Another standout result was his second Fujitsu V8 Supercar Series career race win at the 2011 Sucrogen Townsville 400. Blanchard finished every round of the season in the top-ten, culminating in a fifth-place finish in the 2011 Fujitsu V8 Supercar Series.

2012 saw Blanchard remain in the Dunlop V8 Supercar Series with MW Motorsport. He piloted the ex-FPR Falcon FG that Mark Winterbottom drove in the 2011 V8 Supercars Championship. Following an incident-packed first round at the 2012 Clipsal 500, Blanchard recorded his best finish of the year, a fifth at the 2012 Trading Post Perth Challenge. Consistent strong results followed, but Blanchard's development series program came to a premature end as main series commitments with Kelly Racing, substituting for the injured Todd Kelly, meant he could not complete the season with MW Motorsport.

=== Supercars Championship ===
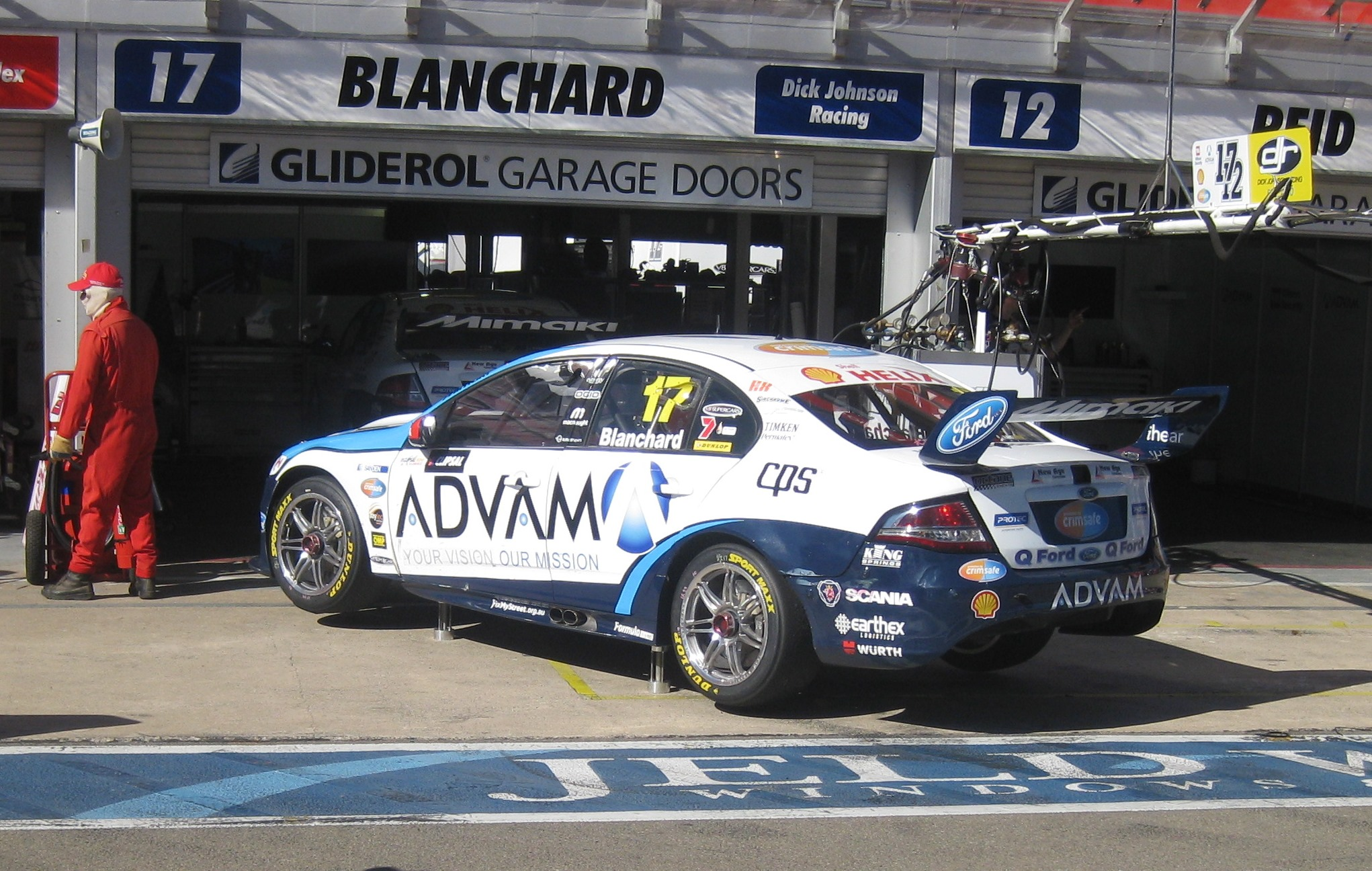
Blanchard placed 26th in the 2013 V8 Supercars Championship driving a Ford Falcon (FG) for Dick Johnson Racing

Blanchard's first experience in the main series came when he picked up an endurance co-driving role with Paul Morris Motorsport, partnering Greg Murphy in the 2010 L&H 500, where they finished 13th.

In 2011, Blanchard signed with Kelly Racing for the two endurance events in the 2011 V8 Supercars Championship, the 2011 L&H 500 and the 2011 Supercheap Auto Bathurst 1000. Blanchard raced alongside David Reynolds in the teams No. 16 Stratco Commodore, making his Bathurst 1000 debut where mechanical issues saw them finish 19th following a standout 6th place at the 2011 L&H 500.

2012 saw Blanchard retained by Kelly Racing for the two endurance events in the 2012 V8 Supercars Championship, the 2012 Dick Smith Sandown 500 and the 2012 Supercheap Auto Bathurst 1000. Blanchard partnered Todd Kelly in the teams No. 7 Jack Daniels Commodore, finishing credible 18th at both events. Following the 2012 Supercheap Auto Bathurst 1000, Blanchard was called up by Kelly Racing to substitute for an injured Todd Kelly for the remaining four rounds of the 2012 V8 Supercars Championship.

In 2013, Blanchard was given a full-time drive with Dick Johnson Racing, Driving the No. 17 Entry.

In 2014, Blanchard became an endurance cup driver, joining Lucas Dumbrell Motorsport.

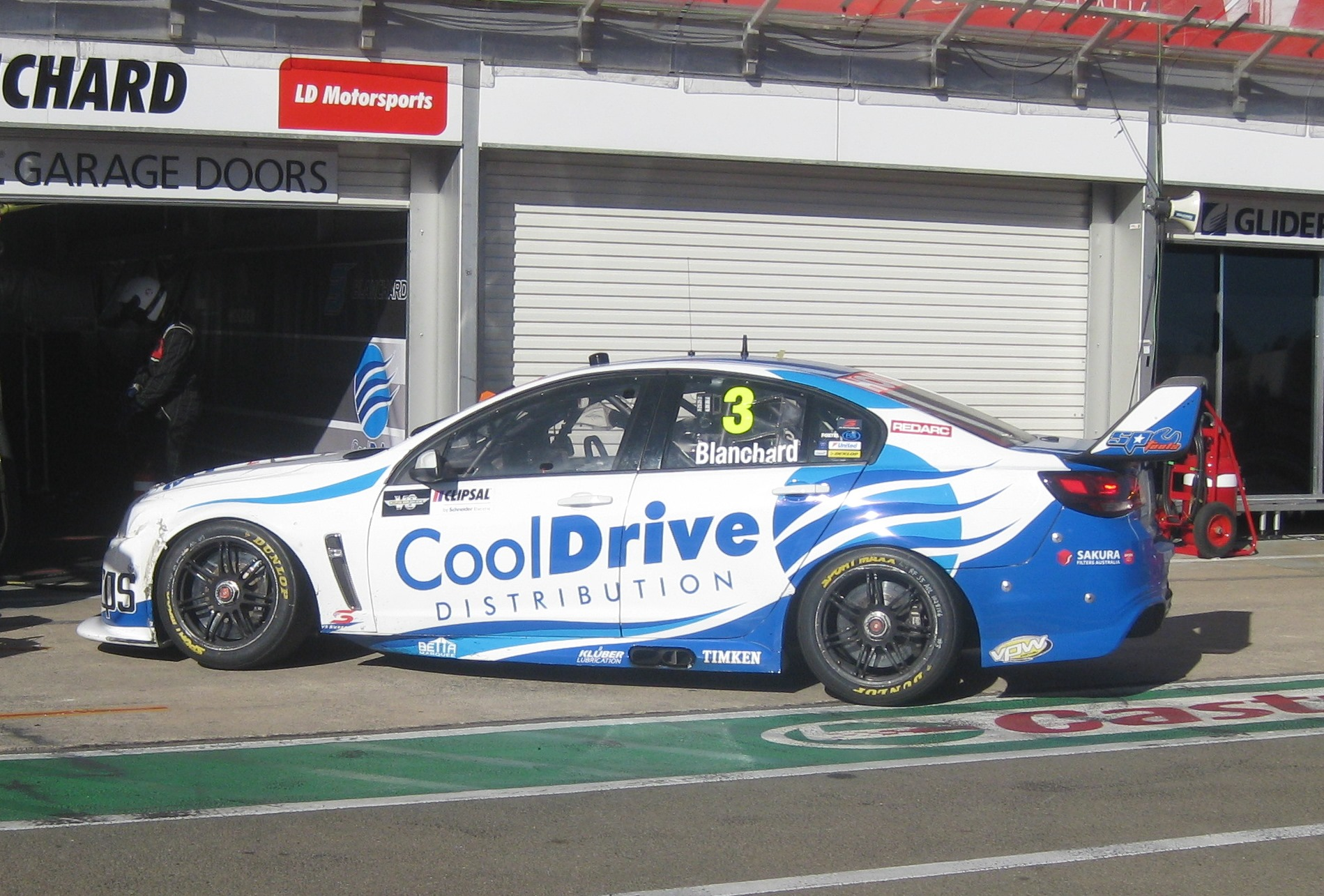
Blanchard placed 21st in the 2015 V8 Supercars Championship driving a Holden Commodore (VF) for Lucas Dumbrell Motorsport

In 2015, Blanchard continued with LDM but was promoted to a full-time drive in the team's No. 3 Commodore.

In 2016, Blanchard moved to Britek Motorsport, a satellite team of Brad Jones Racing.

In 2017, the Britek REC was replaced by Blanchard's own, Blanchard Racing Team, purchased from Super Black Racing.

Blanchard stepped back from full-time racing in the Supercars Championship at the end of the 2018 season, however continuing in following years as a co-driver at endurance events. Blanchard then stepped away from co-driving duties following the 2023 season, in order to focus on managing the family-owned race team as it became a two-car operation.

=== Post-Supercars career ===
Having shifted his focus to managing Blanchard Racing Team, Blanchard only sporadically returned to racing. Blanchard raced in the Australian National Trans-Am Series at Hidden Valley Raceway in 2025 and 2026, a support category to the Supercars Championship for the Darwin Triple Crown.

== Motor racing record ==
Season	Series	Car	Team	Races	Poles	Wins	Points	Position
2005	Victorian Formula Ford Championship	Van Diemen RF04	Sonic Motor Racing Services	15	0	1	392	3rd
2005	Australian Formula Ford Championship	Van Diemen RF04	Sonic Motor Racing Services	3	0	0	0	—
2006	Australian Formula Ford Championship	Van Diemen RF04	Sonic Motor Racing Services	24	0	0	186	5th
2007	Australian Formula Ford Championship	Mygale SJ07A	Sonic Motor Racing Services	24	2	7	346	1st
2008	British Formula Ford Championship	Mygale SJ08	Jamun Racing Services	25	5	3	584	2nd
2010	Fujitsu V8 Supercar Series	Ford Falcon (BF)	Sonic Motor Racing Services	18		1	1520	2nd
2010	V8 Supercar Championship Series	Holden Commodore (VE)	Paul Morris Motorsport	1	0	0	122	59th
2011	Fujitsu V8 Supercar Series	Ford Falcon (BF)	MW Motorsport	17		1	1262	5th
2011	International V8 Supercars Championship	Holden Commodore (VE)	Kelly Racing	2	0	0	288	39th
2012	Dunlop V8 Supercar Series	Ford Falcon (FG)	MW Motorsport	13		1	808	14th
2012	International V8 Supercars Championship	Holden Commodore (VE)	Kelly Racing	11	0	0	460	32nd
2013	International V8 Supercars Championship	Ford Falcon (FG)	Dick Johnson Racing	37	0	0	1080	26th
2014	International V8 Supercars Championship	Holden Commodore (VF)	Lucas Dumbrell Motorsport	3	0	0	23	43rd
2015	International V8 Supercars Championship	Holden Commodore (VF)	Lucas Dumbrell Motorsport	36	0	0	1272	21st
2016	International V8 Supercars Championship	Holden Commodore (VF)	Britek Motorsport	29	0	0	1266	23rd
2017	Virgin Australia Supercars Championship	Holden Commodore (VF)	Tim Blanchard Racing	26	0	0	1302	22nd
2018	Virgin Australia Supercars Championship	Holden Commodore (ZB)	Tim Blanchard Racing	30	0	0	1277	24th
2019	Virgin Australia Supercars Championship	Holden Commodore (ZB)	Brad Jones Racing	7	0	0	499	34th
2019	Dunlop Super2 Series	Holden Commodore (VF)	Brad Jones Racing	2	0	0	258	20th
2020	Virgin Australia Supercars Championship	Holden Commodore (ZB)	Tim Blanchard Racing	1	0	0	132	38th
2021	Repco Supercars Championship	Ford Mustang GT	Tim Blanchard Racing	1	0	0	168	35th
2021	Dunlop Super2 Series	Holden Commodore (VF)	Eggleston Motorsport	2	0	0	267	15th
2022	Repco Supercars Championship	Ford Mustang GT	Blanchard Racing Team	1	0	0		
2022	Australian Formula Ford Championship	Mygale SJ2012	Sonic Motor Racing Services	2	0	2		

=== Super2 Series results ===
(key) (Round results only), (2021 Race results only)

Super2 Series results
Year	Team	No.	Car	1	2	3	4	5	6	7	8	9	10	11	12	13	14	15	16	17	18	Position	Points
2010	Sonic Motor Racing Services	999	Ford BF Falcon	ADE; R1; 5	ADE; R2; 5	QLD; R3; 5	QLD; R4; 10	QLD; R5; 4	WIN; R6; 4	WIN; R7; 6	WIN; R8; 17	TOW; R9; 6	TOW; R10; 3	TOW; R11; 1	BAT; R12; 14	BAT; R13; 5	SAN; R14; 5	SAN; R15; 2	SAN; R16; 5	HOM; R17; 4	HOM; R18; 4	2nd	1520
2011	MW Motorsport	27	Ford BF Falcon	ADE; R1; 4	ADE; R2; 4	BAR; R3; 11	BAR; R4; 9	TOW; R5; 9	TOW; R6; 1	TOW; R7; 11	QLD; R8; 11	QLD; R9; 14	QLD; R10; 6	BAT; R11; 6	BAT; R12; 6	SAN; R13; 7	SAN; R14; 2	SAN; R15; 18	HOM; R16; 6	HOM; R17; 19		5th	1262
2012	MW Motorsport	27	Ford FG Falcon	ADE; R1; Ret	ADE; R2; 8	BAR; R3; 6	BAR; R4; 2	BAR; R5; 5	TOW; R6; 7	TOW; R7; 20	TOW; R8; 4	QLD; R9; 19	QLD; R10; 16	QLD; R11; 9	BAT; R12; 6	BAT; R13; 7	WIN; R14	WIN; R15	WIN; R16	HOM; R17	HOM; R18	14th	808
2014	MW Motorsport	27	Ford FG Falcon	ADE; R1	ADE; R2	WIN; R3	WIN; R4	BAR; R5	BAR; R6	TOW; R7	TOW; R8	QLD; R9; 21	QLD; R10; 9	BAT; R11	HOM; R12	HOM; R13						37th	126
2019	Brad Jones Racing	77	Holden VF Commodore	ADE; R1	ADE; R2	ADE; R3	BAR; R4	BAR; R5	TOW; R6; 3	TOW; R7; 3	QLD; R8	QLD; R9	BAT; R10	SAN; R11	SAN; R12	NEW; R13	NEW; R14					20th	258
2021	Eggleston Motorsport	88	Holden VF Commodore	BAT; R1	BAT; R2	TOW1; R3; 3	TOW1; R4; 2	TOW2; R5	TOW2; R6	SMP; R7; 17	SMP; R8; C	BAT2; R9; 8	BAT2; R10; 8									14th	501
2022	Eggleston Motorsport	54	Holden VF Commodore	SMP; R1	SMP; R2	BAR; R3	BAR; R4	TOW2; R5; 7	TOW2; R6; 9	SAN; R7	SAN; R8	BAT; R9	BAT; R10	ADE; R11	ADE; R12							20th	180

=== Supercars Championship results ===
Supercars results
Year	Team	No.	Car	1	2	3	4	5	6	7	8	9	10	11	12	13	14	15	16	17	18	19	20	21	22	23	24	25	26	27	28	29	30	31	32	33	34	35	36	37	38	39	Position	Points
2010	Paul Morris Motorsport	51	Holden VE Commodore	YMC; R1	YMC; R2	BHR; R3	BHR; R4	ADE; R5	ADE; R6	HAM; R7	HAM; R8	QLD; R9	QLD; R10	WIN; R11	WIN; R12	HDV; R13	HDV; R14	TOW; R15	TOW; R16	PHI; Q 27	PHI; R17; 13	BAT; R18	SUR; R19	SUR; R20	SYM; R21	SYM; R22	SAN; R23	SAN; R24	SYD; R25	SYD; R26													59th	122
2011	Kelly Racing	16	Holden VE Commodore	YMC; R1	YMC; R2	ADE; R3	ADE; R4	HAM; R5	HAM; R6	BAR; R7	BAR; R8	BAR; R9	WIN; R10	WIN; R11	HID; R12	HID; R13	TOW; R14	TOW; R15	QLD; R16	QLD; R17	QLD; R18	PHI; Q 19	PHI; R19; 6	BAT; R20; 19	SUR; R21	SUR; R22	SYM; R23	SYM; R24	SAN; R25	SAN; R26	SYD; R27	SYD; R28											40th	288
2012	Kelly Racing	7	Holden VE Commodore	ADE; R1	ADE; R2	SYM; R3	SYM; R4	HAM; R5	HAM; R6	BAR; R7	BAR; R8	BAR; R9	PHI; R10; PO	PHI; R11; PO	HID; R12; PO	HID; R13; PO	TOW; R14; PO	TOW; R15; PO	QLD; R16; PO	QLD; R17; PO	SMP; R18	SMP; R19	SAN; Q 17	SAN; R20; 18	BAT; R21; 18	SUR; R22; Ret	SUR; R23; Ret	YMC; R24; 24	YMC; R25; 26	YMC; R26; 21	WIN; R27; 22	WIN; R28; 22	SYD; R29; 14	SYD; R30; 20									32nd	460
2013	Dick Johnson Racing	17	Ford FG Falcon	ADE; R1; 18	ADE; R2; 15	SYM; R3; 17	SYM; R4; 26	SYM; R5; 22	PUK; R6; 15	PUK; R7; 23	PUK; R8; Ret	PUK; R9; 20	BAR; R10; 21	BAR; R11; 20	BAR; R12; 23	COA; R13; 19	COA; R14; 24	COA; R15; 26	COA; R16; 23	HID; R17; Ret	HID; R18; 24	HID; R19; 15	TOW; R20; 23	TOW; R21; 23	QLD; R22; 16	QLD; R23; 19	QLD; R24; Ret	WIN; R25; 27	WIN; R26; 21	WIN; R27; 9	SAN; Q 22	SAN; R28; Ret	BAT; R29; 15	SUR; R30; 19	SUR; R31; 16	PHI; R32; 6	PHI; R33; 12	PHI; R34; 16	SYD; R35; Ret	SYD; R36; Ret			26th	1080
2014	Lucas Dumbrell Motorsport	23	Holden VF Commodore	ADE; R1	ADE; R2	ADE; R3	SYM; R4	SYM; R5	SYM; R6	WIN; R7	WIN; R8	WIN; R9	PUK; R10	PUK; R11	PUK; R12	PUK; R13	BAR; R14	BAR; R15	BAR; R16	HID; R17	HID; R18	HID; R19	TOW; R20	TOW; R21	TOW; R22	QLD; R23	QLD; R24	QLD; R25	SMP; R26	SMP; R27	SMP; R28	SAN; Q 19	SAN; R29; 14	BAT; R30; Ret	SUR; R31; 8	SUR; R32; 8	PHI; R33	PHI; R34	PHI; R35	SYD; R36	SYD; R37	SYD; R38	43rd	306
2015	Lucas Dumbrell Motorsport	3	Holden VF Commodore	ADE; R1; 19	ADE; R2; 19	ADE; R3; 17	SYM; R4; 21	SYM; R5; 21	SYM; R6; 20	BAR; R7; 20	BAR; R8; 23	BAR; R9; 12	WIN; R10; 23	WIN; R11; 16	WIN; R12; 20	HID; R13; 17	HID; R14; Ret	HID; R15; 23	TOW; R16; 21	TOW; R17; 21	QLD; R18; 20	QLD; R19; 18	QLD; R20; 23	SMP; R21; 23	SMP; R22; 23	SMP; R23; 18	SAN; Q 15	SAN; R24; 8	BAT; R25; Ret	SUR; R26; 12	SUR; R27; 22	PUK; R28; 22	PUK; R29; 23	PUK; R30; 12	PHI; R31; 20	PHI; R32; 22	PHI; R33; 16	SYD; R34; 25	SYD; R35; 21	SYD; R36; 14			21st	1272
2016	Britek Motorsport	21	Holden VF Commodore	ADE; R1; 24	ADE; R2; 24	ADE; R3; 11	SYM; R4; 15	SYM; R5; Ret	PHI; R6; 22	PHI; R7; 17	BAR; R8; 23	BAR; R9; 22	WIN; R10; 20	WIN; R11; 22	HID; R12; 19	HID; R13; 21	TOW; R14; 19	TOW; R15; 17	QLD; R16; 18	QLD; R17; 25	SMP; R18; 19	SMP; R19; 22	SAN; Q 19	SAN; R20; 20	BAT; R21; 10	SUR; R22; 14	SUR; R23; 18	PUK; R24; 18	PUK; R25; 20	PUK; R26; 26	PUK; R27; 20	SYD; R28; 19	SYD; R29; Ret										23rd	1266
2017	Tim Blanchard Racing	21	Holden VF Commodore	ADE; R1; 19	ADE; R2; 21	SYM; R3; Ret	SYM; R4; Ret	PHI; R5; 15	PHI; R6; 15	BAR; R7; 26	BAR; R8; 23	WIN; R9; 17	WIN; R10; 21	HID; R11; 12	HID; R12; 21	TOW; R13; 14	TOW; R14; 20	QLD; R15; 21	QLD; R16; 17	SMP; R17; 10	SMP; R18; 13	SAN; Q DNS	SAN; R19; DNS	BAT; R20; 12	SUR; R21; 15	SUR; R22; 20	PUK; R23; 19	PUK; R24; 16	NEW; R25; 12	NEW; R26; 16													22nd	1302
2018	Tim Blanchard Racing	21	Holden ZB Commodore	ADE; R1; Ret	ADE; R2; 23	MEL; R3; 23	MEL; R4; 21	MEL; R5; 11	MEL; R6; 20	SYM; R7; 21	SYM; R8; 16	PHI; R9; 21	PHI; R10; 23	BAR; R11; Ret	BAR; R12; 24	WIN; R13; 24	WIN; R14; 18	HID; R15; 19	HID; R16; 18	TOW; R17; 24	TOW; R18; 24	QLD; R19; 23	QLD; R20; 22	SMP; R21; 16	BEN; R22; 15	BEN; R23; 21	SAN; QR; 14	SAN; R24; 19	BAT; R25; 18	SUR; R26; 17	SUR; R27; C	PUK; R28; 12	PUK; R29; 26	NEW; R30; Ret	NEW; R31; 22								24th	1277
2019	Brad Jones Racing	77	Holden ZB Commodore	ADE; R1	ADE; R2	MEL; R3	MEL; R4	MEL; R5	MEL; R6	SYM; R7; PO	SYM; R8; PO	PHI; R9	PHI; R10	BAR; R11; 21	BAR; R12; 18	WIN; R13	WIN; R14	HID; R15	HID; R16	TOW; R17	TOW; R18	QLD; R19; PO	QLD; R20; PO	BEN; R21	BEN; R22	PUK; R23	PUK; R24																34th	499
2019	Brad Jones Racing	8	Holden ZB Commodore																									BAT; R25; 14	SUR; R26; 14	SUR; R27; 10	SAN; QR; 16	SAN; R28; 11	NEW; R29	NEW; R30									34th	499
2020	Tim Blanchard Racing	3	Holden ZB Commodore	ADE; R1	ADE; R2	MEL; R3	MEL; R4	MEL; R5	MEL; R6	SMP1; R7	SMP1; R8	SMP1; R9	SMP2; R10	SMP2; R11	SMP2; R12	HID1; R13	HID1; R14	HID1; R15	HID2; R16	HID2; R17	HID2; R18	TOW1; R19	TOW1; R20	TOW1; R21	TOW2; R22	TOW2; R23	TOW2; R24	BEN1; R25	BEN1; R26	BEN1; R27	BEN2; R28	BEN2; R29	BEN2; R30	BAT; R31; 13									38th	132
2021	Tim Blanchard Racing	3	Ford Mustang S550	BAT1; R1	BAT1; R2	SAN; R3	SAN; R4	SAN; R5	SYM; R6	SYM; R7	SYM; R8	BEN; R9	BEN; R10	BEN; R11	HID; R12	HID; R13	HID; R14	TOW1; R15	TOW1; R16	TOW2; R17	TOW2; R18	TOW2; R19	SMP1; R20	SMP1; R21	SMP1; R22	SMP2; R23	SMP2; R24	SMP2; R25	SMP3; R26	SMP3; R27	SMP3; R28	SMP4; R29	SMP4; R30	BAT2; R31; 9									35th	168
2022	Blanchard Racing Team	3	Ford Mustang S550	SYD; R1	SYD; R2	SYM; R6	SYM; R7	SYM; R8	MEL; R6	MEL; R7	MEL; R8	MEL; R9	WAN; R10	WAN; R11	WAN; R12	WIN; R13	WIN; R14	WIN; R15	HID; R16	HID; R17	HID; R18	TOW; R19	TOW; R20	BEN; R21	BEN; R22	BEN; R23	SAN; R24	SAN; R25	SAN; R26	PUK; R27	PUK; R28	PUK; R29	BAT; R30; 19	SUR; R31	SUR; R32	ADE; R33	ADE; R34						50th	96
2023	Blanchard Racing Team	3	Ford Mustang S650	NEW; R1	NEW; R2	MEL; R3	MEL; R4	MEL; R5	MEL; R6	BAR; R7	BAR; R8	BAR; R9	SYM; R10	SYM; R11	SYM; R12	HID; R13	HID; R14	HID; R15	TOW; R16	TOW; R17	SMP; R18	SMP; R19	BEN; R20	BEN; R21	BEN; R22	SAN; R23; 17	BAT; R24; Ret	SUR; R25	SUR; R26	ADE; R27	ADE; R28												53rd	108

=== Complete Bathurst 1000 results ===
Year	Team	Car	Co-driver	Position	Laps
2011	Kelly Racing	Holden Commodore VE	(Australia) David Reynolds	19th	161
2012	Kelly Racing	Holden Commodore VE	(Australia) Todd Kelly	18th	161
2013	Dick Johnson Racing	Ford Falcon FG	(Australia) Ashley Walsh	15th	161
2014	Lucas Dumbrell Motorsport	Holden Commodore VF	(Australia) Russell Ingall	DNF	137
2015	Lucas Dumbrell Motorsport	Holden Commodore VF	(Australia) Karl Reindler	DNF	78
2016	Britek Motorsport	Holden Commodore VF	(Australia) Macauley Jones	10th	161
2017	Tim Blanchard Racing	Holden Commodore VF	(Australia) Todd Hazelwood	12th	160
2018	Tim Blanchard Racing	Holden Commodore ZB	(Australia) Dale Wood	18th	159
2019	Brad Jones Racing	Holden Commodore ZB	(Australia) Nick Percat	14th	160
2020	Tim Blanchard Racing	Holden Commodore ZB	(Australia) Macauley Jones	13th	161
2021	Blanchard Racing Team	Ford Mustang S550	(Australia) Tim Slade	9th	161
2022	Blanchard Racing Team	Ford Mustang S550	(Australia) Tim Slade	19th	161
2023	Blanchard Racing Team	Ford Mustang S650	(Australia) Todd Hazelwood	DNF	156

Sporting positions
Preceded by John Martin	Australian Formula Ford Championship; Champion; 2007	Succeeded by Paul Laskazeski
Awards and achievements
Preceded by James Moffat	Mike Kable Young Gun Award; 2010	Succeeded by Chaz Mostert
