= 2007 Australian Formula Ford Championship =

Motor racing competition

Seasons
- ← 2006 2008 →

The 2007 Australian Formula Ford Championship was an Australian motor racing competition open to Formula Ford racing cars. Managed by Australian Formula Ford Management Pty. Ltd., it was recognised by the Confederation of Australian Motor Sport (CAMS) as a National Championship. It was the 38th national series for Formula Fords to be contested in Australia and the 15th series to carry the Australian Formula Ford Championship name.

The championship was won by Tim Blanchard driving a Mygale SJ07A.

== Teams and drivers ==
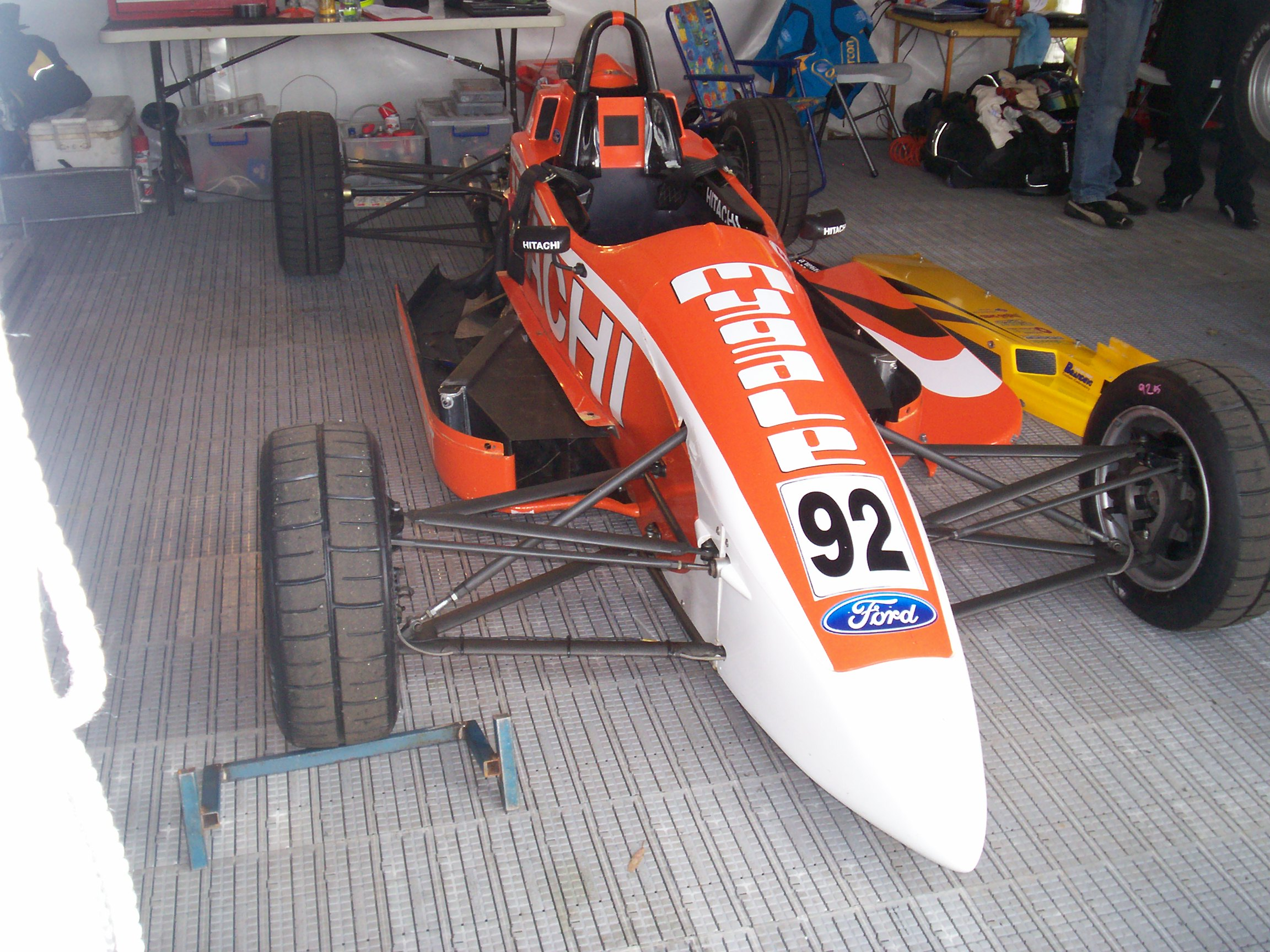
The Mygale SJ06 Ford of Taz Douglas at the Sandown round of the championship.

Team	Chassis	No	Driver	Rounds
Centenary Classic	Van Diemen RF06	2	(Australia) Jonathan Grant	1–3, 5
Sonic Motor Racing Services	Mygale SJ07A	3	(Australia) Tim Blanchard	All
Sonic Motor Racing Services	Mygale SJ07A	4	(Australia) Glen Wood	All
Sonic Motor Racing Services	Mygale SJ07A	5	(Australia) James Moffat	All
Borland Racing Developments	Spectrum 011b	8	(Australia) Kristian Lindbom	All
Borland Racing Developments	Spectrum 011b	45	(Australia) Ashley Walsh	All
Borland Racing Developments	Spectrum 011b	89	(Australia) Joshua Scott	All
Escalate Management	Van Diemen RF06	11	(Australia) Tony LeMessurier	1, 3
Escalate Management	Van Diemen RF06	11	(Australia) Daniel Pappas	6, 8
Escalate Management	Van Diemen RF06	27	(Australia) Victoria Whitley	4–5
Preston Motors Racing	Van Diemen RF06	13	(Australia) James Bergmuller	1, 3–4, 6, 8
Doulman Industries Racing	Spirit WL06	15	(Australia) Grant Doulman	1, 3–6, 8
Walkinshaw Racing	Spectrum 011b	16	(Australia) Nick Percat	All
Anglo Motorsport	Spirit WL06	17	(Australia) Luke Wood	All
Anglo Motorsport	Spirit WL07	41	(Australia) Brad Lowe	1, 3–6
G-Force Motorsport	Mygale SJ07A	18	(Australia) Asher Johnston	1, 6
G-Force Motorsport	Mygale SJ06	92	(Australia) Taz Douglas	All
Team BRM	Van Diemen RF06	20	(Australia) John Magro	1–5
Team BRM	Van Diemen RF06	20	(Republic of Ireland) Lee Farrell	8
Team BRM	Van Diemen RF06	99	(Australia) Paul Pittam	1–4
Unit Clothing	Van Diemen RF06	20	(Australia) Chris Reindler	6
E-Steel (Aust.) P/L	Spectrum 011	21	(Australia) James Crozier	7–8
Cotton Painters	Spectrum 011	25	(Australia) Daniel Cotton	All
Mozna Motors-Mygale	Mygale SJ08A	30	(Australia) Trent Harrison	8
Orrcon - Pioneer Electronics	Van Diemen RF05	36	(Australia) Michael Pereira	6
ComCorp Global Products	Spectrum 011	40	(Australia) Trent Ulmer	1, 3–4
Toshiba Mobile Computers	Van Diemen RF03	42	(Australia) Samantha Reid	1
Icon Motorsport	Spectrum 011b	43	(Australia) Ben Morley	4
Excelerate Motorsport	Mygale SJ02	50	(Australia) Mark Samson	3
MakoTrac International Racetrack	Van Diemen RF06	55	(Australia) Tobia Kipper	All
	Spectrum 011	58	(Australia) Troy Woodger	1
Affordable Mower Spares	Van Diemen RF06	62	(Australia) Sam Sewell	1, 3–8
Minda Motorsport	Spectrum 011	66	(Australia) Adam Graham	5–6, 8
No Sponsor Racing	Van Diemen RF04	74	(Australia) Yudi Doyle	1, 3–4, 6, 8
Autobarn Virginia/Motul Oils	Spectrum 011b	77	(Australia) Blake Varney	All

== Calendar ==
The championship was contested over an eight-round series with three races per round.

Round	Circuit	Dates	Supporting	Map
1	(South Australia) Adelaide Street Circuit	1–4 March	V8 Supercar Championship Series	2007 Australian Formula Ford Championship is located in Australia
2	(Western Australia) Wanneroo Raceway	23–25 March	V8 Supercar Championship Series	2007 Australian Formula Ford Championship is located in Australia
3	(Victoria (state)) Winton Motor Raceway	18–20 May	V8 Supercar Championship Series	2007 Australian Formula Ford Championship is located in Australia
4	(New South Wales) Eastern Creek Raceway	9–11 June	V8 Supercar Championship Series	2007 Australian Formula Ford Championship is located in Australia
5	Queensland Raceway	19–22 July	V8 Supercar Championship Series	2007 Australian Formula Ford Championship is located in Australia
6	(Victoria (state)) Sandown Raceway	14–16 September	V8 Supercar Championship Series	2007 Australian Formula Ford Championship is located in Australia
7	(Tasmania) Symmons Plains Raceway	16–18 November	V8 Supercar Championship Series	2007 Australian Formula Ford Championship is located in Australia
8	(Victoria (state)) Phillip Island Grand Prix Circuit	29 November–1 December	V8 Supercar Championship Series	2007 Australian Formula Ford Championship is located in Australia

== Season summary ==
Rd	Race	Circuit	Pole position	Fastest lap	Winning driver	Winning team	Round Winner
1	1	(South Australia) Adelaide Street Circuit	(Australia) Tim Blanchard	(Australia) Nick Percat	(Australia) Tim Blanchard	Sonic Motor Racing Services	(Australia) Tim Blanchard
1	2	(South Australia) Adelaide Street Circuit		(Australia) Ashley Walsh	(Australia) Tim Blanchard	Sonic Motor Racing Services	(Australia) Tim Blanchard
1	3	(South Australia) Adelaide Street Circuit		(Australia) Ashley Walsh	(Australia) Ashley Walsh	Sonic Motor Racing Services	(Australia) Tim Blanchard
2	1	(Western Australia) Wanneroo Raceway	(Australia) Ashley Walsh	(Australia) Ashley Walsh	(Australia) James Moffat	Sonic Motor Racing Services	(Australia) James Moffat
2	2	(Western Australia) Wanneroo Raceway		(Australia) Joshua Scott	(Australia) James Moffat	Sonic Motor Racing Services	(Australia) James Moffat
2	3	(Western Australia) Wanneroo Raceway		(Australia) James Moffat	(Australia) Ashley Walsh	Sonic Motor Racing Services	(Australia) James Moffat
3	1	(Victoria (state)) Winton Motor Raceway	(Australia) Tim Blanchard	(Australia) Ashley Walsh	(Australia) Tim Blanchard	Sonic Motor Racing Services	(Australia) Tim Blanchard
3	2	(Victoria (state)) Winton Motor Raceway		(Australia) Nick Percat	(Australia) Tim Blanchard	Sonic Motor Racing Services	(Australia) Tim Blanchard
3	3	(Victoria (state)) Winton Motor Raceway		(Australia) Ashley Walsh	(Australia) Tim Blanchard	Sonic Motor Racing Services	(Australia) Tim Blanchard
4	1	(New South Wales) Eastern Creek Raceway	(Australia) Ashley Walsh	(Australia) James Moffat	(Australia) Ashley Walsh	Borland Racing Developments	(Australia) Ashley Walsh
4	2	(New South Wales) Eastern Creek Raceway		(Australia) Ashley Walsh	(Australia) Ashley Walsh	Borland Racing Developments	(Australia) Ashley Walsh
4	3	(New South Wales) Eastern Creek Raceway		(Australia) Ashley Walsh	(Australia) Ashley Walsh	Borland Racing Developments	(Australia) Ashley Walsh
5	1	Queensland Raceway	(Australia) Glen Wood	(Australia) Ashley Walsh	(Australia) Ashley Walsh	Borland Racing Developments	(Australia) Ashley Walsh
5	2	Queensland Raceway		(Australia) Ashley Walsh	(Australia) Ashley Walsh	Borland Racing Developments	(Australia) Ashley Walsh
5	3	Queensland Raceway		(Australia) Ashley Walsh	(Australia) Ashley Walsh	Borland Racing Developments	(Australia) Ashley Walsh
6	1	(Victoria (state)) Sandown Raceway	(Australia) Joshua Scott	(Australia) Joshua Scott	(Australia) Ashley Walsh	Borland Racing Developments	(Australia) Glen Wood
6	2	(Victoria (state)) Sandown Raceway		(Australia) Joshua Scott	(Australia) Ashley Walsh	Borland Racing Developments	(Australia) Glen Wood
6	3	(Victoria (state)) Sandown Raceway		(Australia) Tim Blanchard	(Australia) Glen Wood	Sonic Motor Racing Services	(Australia) Glen Wood
7	1	(Tasmania) Symmons Plains Raceway	(Australia) Joshua Scott	(Australia) Joshua Scott	(Australia) Kristian Lindbom	Borland Racing Developments	(Australia) Kristian Lindbom
7	2	(Tasmania) Symmons Plains Raceway		(Australia) Nick Percat	(Australia) Kristian Lindbom	Borland Racing Developments	(Australia) Kristian Lindbom
7	3	(Tasmania) Symmons Plains Raceway		(Australia) Ashley Walsh	(Australia) Nick Percat	Walkinshaw Racing	(Australia) Kristian Lindbom
8	1	(Victoria (state)) Phillip Island Grand Prix Circuit	(Australia) Ashley Walsh	(Australia) James Moffat	(Australia) James Moffat	Sonic Motor Racing Services	(Australia) Tim Blanchard
8	2	(Victoria (state)) Phillip Island Grand Prix Circuit		(Australia) Ashley Walsh	(Australia) Tim Blanchard	Sonic Motor Racing Services	(Australia) Tim Blanchard
8	3	(Victoria (state)) Phillip Island Grand Prix Circuit		(Australia) Ashley Walsh	(Australia) Tim Blanchard	Sonic Motor Racing Services	(Australia) Tim Blanchard

== Points system ==
Championship points were awarded on a 20-16-14-12-10-8-6-4-2-1 basis to the top ten finishers in each race, with a bonus point awarded to the driver achieving pole position for the first race at each round.

== Championship results ==
Pos.	Driver	(South Australia) ADE			(Western Australia) WAN			(Victoria (state)) WIN			(New South Wales) EAS			(Queensland) QUE			(Victoria (state)) SAN			(Tasmania) SYM			(Victoria (state)) PHI			Pts
Pos.	Driver	R1	R2	R3	R1	R2	R3	R1	R2	R3	R1	R2	R3	R1	R2	R3	R1	R2	R3	R1	R2	R3	R1	R2	R3	Pts
1	(Australia) Tim Blanchard	1	1	3	4	4	2	1	1	1	3	2	3	4	5	5	16	2	13	2	2	4	3	1	1	346
2	(Australia) Ashley Walsh	Ret	5	1	14	2	1	Ret	10	5	1	1	1	1	1	1	1	1	10	6	Ret	2	Ret	2	2	297
3	(Australia) James Moffat	3	2	2	1	1	3	5	2	Ret	2	6	4	6	3	4	10	12	6	8	5	5	1	4	3	275
4	(Australia) Kristian Lindbom	4	3	4	2	6	5	4	3	3	5	Ret	DNS	2	2	8	3	Ret	8	1	1	3	5	Ret	4	252
5	(Australia) Glen Wood	6	4	Ret	5	5	7	3	7	6	8	3	5	Ret	9	6	2	4	1	5	4	Ret	2	Ret	9	201
6	(Australia) Joshua Scott	7	11	7	3	3	4	Ret	13	4	Ret	7	2	3	4	2	17	3	4	4	Ret	8	9	3	Ret	188
7	(Australia) Nick Percat	2	Ret	12	10	10	14	2	5	2	DSQ	DSQ	DSQ	7	16	Ret	4	5	2	3	3	1	Ret	5	5	167
8	(Australia) Taz Douglas	Ret	8	Ret	9	14	8	Ret	4	Ret	6	4	14	Ret	8	3	Ret	9	Ret	Ret	Ret	10	4	Ret	Ret	75
9	(Australia) Sam Sewell	10	19	13				10	Ret	13	Ret	18	10	5	7	7	5	10	Ret	7	6	6	6	Ret	Ret	66
10	(Australia) Tobia Kipper	12	13	Ret	15	12	11	7	6	11	7	5	6	11	13	14	7	11	7	10	7	9	8	14	Ret	63
11	(Australia) Grant Doulman	5	9	6				11	15	7	16	11	11	10	10	9	8	Ret	9				11	7	8	46
12	(Australia) Brad Lowe	11	7	5				Ret	18	Ret	4	Ret	DNS	Ret	DNS	DNS	Ret	8	Ret							32
13	(Australia) Adam Graham													9	6	12	Ret	7	3				17	9	Ret	32
14	(Australia) Luke Wood	9	6	Ret	8	8	10	12	9	8	9	9	12	15	Ret	Ret	13	14	Ret	12	Ret	Ret	16	Ret	Ret	29
15	(Australia) Michael Pereira																6	6	5							26
16	(Australia) Jonathan Grant	8	20	10	7	9	6	14	19	DNS				8	12	13										25
17	(Australia) Blake Varney	Ret	Ret	Ret	12	11	Ret	13	Ret	12	14	15	Ret	12	15	Ret	Ret	13	12	9	Ret	7	10	6	7	23
18	(Australia) John Magro	13	14	Ret	6	7	9	Ret	14	10	10	14	Ret	13	11	11										18
19	(Australia) James Bergmuller	18	10	Ret				9	11	17	15	16	15				11	Ret	Ret				7	11	6	17
20	(Australia) Daniel Cotton	Ret	Ret	Ret	13	13	13	8	Ret	15	11	10	8	14	14	10	9	Ret	14	11	8	11	14	13	11	16
21	(Australia) Trent Ulmer	15	Ret	14				6	8	9	12	13	13													14
22	(Australia) Ben Morley										Ret	8	7													10
23	(Australia) Samantha Reid	16	15	8																						4
24	(Australia) Trent Harrison																						Ret	8	Ret	4
25	(Australia) Tony LeMessurier	17	16	9				15	17	16																2
26	(Australia) James Crozier																			13	9	12	13	15	Ret	2
27	(Australia) Paul Pittam	20	12	Ret	11	Ret	12	16	12	14	13	12	9													2
28	(Australia) Daniel Pappas																12	17	11				12	10	Ret	1
29	(Republic of Ireland) Lee Farrell																						15	Ret	10	1
-	(Australia) Asher Johnston	14	Ret	11													14	16	Ret							0
-	(Australia) Troy Woodger	19	18	Ret																						0
-	(Australia) Yudi Doyle	Ret	17	15				Ret	16	18	17	17	16				15	18	Ret				18	12	Ret	0
-	(Australia) Mark Samson							17	20	19																0
-	(Australia) Victoria Whitley										18	19	17	16	17	15										0
-	(Australia) Chris Reindler																18	15	Ret							0
Pos.	Driver	(South Australia) ADE			(Western Australia) WAN			(Victoria (state)) WIN			(New South Wales) EAS			(Queensland) QUE			(Victoria (state)) SAN			(Tasmania) SYM			(Victoria (state)) PHI			Pts
Pos.	Driver	R1	R2	R3	R1	R2	R3	R1	R2	R3	R1	R2	R3	R1	R2	R3	R1	R2	R3	R1	R2	R3	R1	R2	R3	Pts

- Note 1: All cars were required to use a 1600cc Ford Duratec engine.
- Note 2: A 5-point penalty was imposed on Nick Percat at Eastern Creek (Round 4) due to a breach of the Sporting Regulations.
