= 2015 Perth Super Sprint =

2015 V8 Supercar championship race

(Western Australia) 2015 Ubet Perth Super Sprint
Event Information
- Round 3 of 14 in the 2015 International V8 Supercars Championship
- Date: 1–3 May 2015
- Location: Perth, Western Australia
- Venue: Barbagallo Raceway
- Weather: Fine

Results
Race 1
Distance	25 laps	60 km
Pole position	Chaz Mostert; Prodrive Racing Australia	57.0403
Winner	Mark Winterbottom; Prodrive Racing Australia	24:36.1409
Race 2
Distance	25 laps	60 km
Pole position	Mark Winterbottom; Prodrive Racing Australia	56.9013
Winner	Mark Winterbottom; Prodrive Racing Australia	24:34.8717
Race 3
Distance	83 laps	200 km
Pole position	Chaz Mostert; Prodrive Racing Australia	57.1321
Winner	Will Davison; Erebus Motorsport	1:25:26.7266

The 2015 Ubet Perth Super Sprint was a motor race for V8 Supercars held from 1–3 May 2015. The event was held at Barbagallo Raceway in Wanneroo, Western Australia, and consisted of two sprint races, each over a distance of 60 kilometres (37 miles) and one endurance race over a distance of 200 kilometres (124 miles). It was the third round of fourteen in the 2015 International V8 Supercars Championship.

On Saturday, Prodrive Racing Australia's Chaz Mostert scored his first V8 Supercar pole position for Race 7, while teammate Mark Winterbottom scored pole position for Race 8. Winterbottom took the lead from Mostert at the start of Race 7 and did not look back, taking the first championship win for the Ford FG X Falcon in V8 Supercars. Jamie Whincup could only manage to finish 15th after starting 21st on the grid. Winterbottom also won Race 8 from starting on pole, ahead of Whincup and Fabian Coulthard.

Mostert scored another pole position for Race 9 on Sunday, with Winterbottom starting alongside, completing a weekend front-row lockout for Prodrive Racing Australia. With Craig Lowndes looking towards his 100th career race win, it was looking certain after compulsory pit stops were completed. With 10 laps remaining, Erebus Motorsport's Will Davison was quick to catch up to Lowndes and managed to pass him with 5 laps remaining. Davison took the race win – his first since the 2013 Sucrogen Townsville 400 and his first in a Mercedes-Benz. Lowndes held on to second place, while Coulthard scored another podium finish.

== Results ==
=== Race 7 ===
Pos.	No.	Driver	Car	Team	Laps	Time/Retired	Grid	Points
1	5	(Australia) Mark Winterbottom	Ford FG X Falcon	Prodrive Racing Australia	25	24:36.1409	2	75
2	6	(Australia) Chaz Mostert	Ford FG X Falcon	Prodrive Racing Australia	25	+0.6 s	1	69
3	888	(Australia) Craig Lowndes	Holden VF Commodore	Triple Eight Race Engineering	25	+2.9 s	3	64
4	97	(New Zealand) Shane van Gisbergen	Holden VF Commodore	Tekno Autosports	25	+8.8 s	5	60
5	8	(Australia) Jason Bright	Holden VF Commodore	Brad Jones Racing	25	+9.2 s	8	55
6	55	(Australia) David Reynolds	Ford FG X Falcon	Rod Nash Racing	25	+10.1 s	7	51
7	9	(Australia) Will Davison	Mercedes-Benz E63 AMG	Erebus Motorsport	25	+13.0 s	9	48
8	14	(New Zealand) Fabian Coulthard	Holden VF Commodore	Brad Jones Racing	25	+16.3 s	14	45
9	15	(Australia) Rick Kelly	Nissan Altima L33	Nissan Motorsport	25	+18.0 s	11	42
10	22	(Australia) James Courtney	Holden VF Commodore	Holden Racing Team	25	+18.5 s	6	39
11	33	(New Zealand) Scott McLaughlin	Volvo S60	Garry Rogers Motorsport	25	+18.9 s	13	36
12	7	(Australia) Todd Kelly	Nissan Altima L33	Nissan Motorsport	25	+24.3 s	12	34
13	99	(Australia) James Moffat	Nissan Altima L33	Nissan Motorsport	25	+25.0 s	17	33
14	18	(Australia) Lee Holdsworth	Holden VF Commodore	Charlie Schwerkolt Racing	25	+25.2 s	15	31
15	1	(Australia) Jamie Whincup	Holden VF Commodore	Triple Eight Race Engineering	25	+25.6 s	21	30
16	300	(Australia) Tim Slade	Holden VF Commodore	Walkinshaw Racing	25	+26.6 s	10	28
17	4	(Australia) Ashley Walsh	Mercedes-Benz E63 AMG	Erebus Motorsport	25	+27.5 s	16	27
18	23	(Australia) Michael Caruso	Nissan Altima L33	Nissan Motorsport	25	+27.9 s	20	25
19	222	(Australia) Nick Percat	Holden VF Commodore	Lucas Dumbrell Motorsport	25	+28.2 s	24	24
20	3	(Australia) Tim Blanchard	Holden VF Commodore	Lucas Dumbrell Motorsport	25	+29.1 s	23	22
21	111	(New Zealand) Andre Heimgartner	Ford FG X Falcon	Super Black Racing	25	+29.6 s	18	21
22	17	(Australia) Scott Pye	Ford FG X Falcon	DJR Team Penske	25	+30.5 s	22	19
23	34	(Australia) David Wall	Volvo S60	Garry Rogers Motorsport	25	+31.2 s	25	18
24	21	(Australia) Dale Wood	Holden VF Commodore	Britek Motorsport	25	+31.6 s	19	16
DNF	2	(Australia) Garth Tander	Holden VF Commodore	Holden Racing Team	7		4	

=== Race 8 ===
Pos.	No.	Driver	Car	Team	Laps	Time/Retired	Grid	Points
1	5	(Australia) Mark Winterbottom	Ford FG X Falcon	Prodrive Racing Australia	25	24:34.8717	1	75
2	1	(Australia) Jamie Whincup	Holden VF Commodore	Triple Eight Race Engineering	25	+2.9 s	2	69
3	14	(New Zealand) Fabian Coulthard	Holden VF Commodore	Brad Jones Racing	25	+3.3 s	3	64
4	6	(Australia) Chaz Mostert	Ford FG X Falcon	Prodrive Racing Australia	25	+3.7 s	5	60
5	888	(Australia) Craig Lowndes	Holden VF Commodore	Triple Eight Race Engineering	25	+4.7 s	4	55
6	22	(Australia) James Courtney	Holden VF Commodore	Holden Racing Team	25	+4.9 s	6	51
7	55	(Australia) David Reynolds	Ford FG X Falcon	Rod Nash Racing	25	+7.3 s	7	48
8	15	(Australia) Rick Kelly	Nissan Altima L33	Nissan Motorsport	25	+11.4 s	9	45
9	9	(Australia) Will Davison	Mercedes-Benz E63 AMG	Erebus Motorsport	25	+11.7 s	8	42
10	300	(Australia) Tim Slade	Holden VF Commodore	Walkinshaw Racing	25	+12.4 s	10	39
11	2	(Australia) Garth Tander	Holden VF Commodore	Holden Racing Team	25	+12.7 s	11	36
12	7	(Australia) Todd Kelly	Nissan Altima L33	Nissan Motorsport	25	+15.2 s	13	34
13	8	(Australia) Jason Bright	Holden VF Commodore	Brad Jones Racing	25	+15.9 s	14	33
14	18	(Australia) Lee Holdsworth	Holden VF Commodore	Charlie Schwerkolt Racing	25	+17.2 s	16	31
15	23	(Australia) Michael Caruso	Nissan Altima L33	Nissan Motorsport	25	+17.6 s	17	30
16	111	(New Zealand) Andre Heimgartner	Ford FG X Falcon	Super Black Racing	25	+17.9 s	15	28
17	222	(Australia) Nick Percat	Holden VF Commodore	Lucas Dumbrell Motorsport	25	+21.5 s	20	27
18	4	(Australia) Ashley Walsh	Mercedes-Benz E63 AMG	Erebus Motorsport	25	+25.2 s	25	25
19	21	(Australia) Dale Wood	Holden VF Commodore	Britek Motorsport	25	+27.3 s	21	24
20	99	(Australia) James Moffat	Nissan Altima L33	Nissan Motorsport	25	+29.2 s	22	22
21	17	(Australia) Scott Pye	Ford FG X Falcon	DJR Team Penske	25	+31.8 s	19	21
22	34	(Australia) David Wall	Volvo S60	Garry Rogers Motorsport	25	+32.1 s	23	19
23	3	(Australia) Tim Blanchard	Holden VF Commodore	Lucas Dumbrell Motorsport	25	+45.8 s	24	18
24	97	(New Zealand) Shane van Gisbergen	Holden VF Commodore	Tekno Autosports	25	+59.6 s	18	16
DNF	33	(New Zealand) Scott McLaughlin	Volvo S60	Garry Rogers Motorsport	11		12	

=== Race 9 ===
Pos.	No.	Driver	Car	Team	Laps	Time/Retired	Grid	Points
1	9	(Australia) Will Davison	Mercedes-Benz E63 AMG	Erebus Motorsport	83	1:25:26.7266	7	150
2	888	(Australia) Craig Lowndes	Holden VF Commodore	Triple Eight Race Engineering	83	+5.6 s	6	138
3	14	(New Zealand) Fabian Coulthard	Holden VF Commodore	Brad Jones Racing	83	+7.4 s	24	129
4	6	(Australia) Chaz Mostert	Ford FG X Falcon	Prodrive Racing Australia	83	+12.1 s	1	120
5	22	(Australia) James Courtney	Holden VF Commodore	Holden Racing Team	83	+14.8 s	11	111
6	2	(Australia) Garth Tander	Holden VF Commodore	Holden Racing Team	83	+16.7 s	3	102
7	99	(Australia) James Moffat	Nissan Altima L33	Nissan Motorsport	83	+20.2 s	10	96
8	222	(Australia) Nick Percat	Holden VF Commodore	Lucas Dumbrell Motorsport	83	+24.5 s	14	90
9	55	(Australia) David Reynolds	Ford FG X Falcon	Rod Nash Racing	83	+24.8 s	5	84
10	23	(Australia) Michael Caruso	Nissan Altima L33	Nissan Motorsport	83	+25.1 s	20	78
11	21	(Australia) Dale Wood	Holden VF Commodore	Britek Motorsport	83	+28.6 s	22	72
12	3	(Australia) Tim Blanchard	Holden VF Commodore	Lucas Dumbrell Motorsport	83	+30.3 s	21	69
13	7	(Australia) Todd Kelly	Nissan Altima L33	Nissan Motorsport	83	+31.1 s	18	66
14	97	(New Zealand) Shane van Gisbergen	Holden VF Commodore	Tekno Autosports	83	+34.9 s	9	63
15	5	(Australia) Mark Winterbottom	Ford FG X Falcon	Prodrive Racing Australia	83	+35.5 s	2	60
16	8	(Australia) Jason Bright	Holden VF Commodore	Brad Jones Racing	83	+35.9 s	19	57
17	18	(Australia) Lee Holdsworth	Holden VF Commodore	Charlie Schwerkolt Racing	83	+36.3 s	25	54
18	33	(New Zealand) Scott McLaughlin	Volvo S60	Garry Rogers Motorsport	83	+40.9 s	13	51
19	1	(Australia) Jamie Whincup	Holden VF Commodore	Triple Eight Race Engineering	82	+1 lap	4	48
20	15	(Australia) Rick Kelly	Nissan Altima L33	Nissan Motorsport	82	+1 lap	12	45
21	34	(Australia) David Wall	Volvo S60	Garry Rogers Motorsport	82	+1 lap	23	42
22	4	(Australia) Ashley Walsh	Mercedes-Benz E63 AMG	Erebus Motorsport	77	+6 laps	16	39
23	300	(Australia) Tim Slade	Holden VF Commodore	Walkinshaw Racing	69	+14 laps	8	36
DNF	111	(New Zealand) Andre Heimgartner	Ford FG X Falcon	Super Black Racing	78		15	
DNF	17	(Australia) Scott Pye	Ford FG X Falcon	DJR Team Penske	78		17	

== Championship standings ==
- After Race 9 of 36

Drivers' Championship standings

Pos.	Driver	Points
1	(Australia) Craig Lowndes	717
2	(Australia) James Courtney	665
3	(Australia) Mark Winterbottom	643
4	(New Zealand) Fabian Coulthard	641
5	(Australia) Jamie Whincup	630

Teams' Championship standings

Pos.	Constructor	Points
1	Triple Eight Race Engineering	1347
2	Holden Racing Team	1260
3	Prodrive Racing Australia	1188
4	Brad Jones Racing	1070
5	Nissan Motorsport (7/15)	825

- Note: Only the top five positions are included for both sets of standings.
