= 2005 Australian Formula Ford Championship =

Motor racing competition

Seasons
- ← 2004 2006 →

The 2005 Australian Formula Ford Championship was an Australian motor racing competition for Formula Ford racing cars. Contested as the 2005 Ford Racing Australian Formula Ford Championship, it was recognised by the Confederation of Australian Motor Sport (CAMS) as a National Championship. The championship, which was administered by Formula Ford Australia Inc., was the 36th Australian national series for Formula Fords and the 13th to be contested under the Australian Formula Ford Championship name.

The championship was won by Daniel Elliott driving a Van Diemen RF05 for Fastlane Racing.

== Teams and drivers ==
The following teams and drivers contested the 2005 Australian Formula Ford Championship. All teams were Australian-registered.

Team	Chassis	No	Driver	Rounds
Sonic Motor Racing Services	Van Diemen RF02	2	(Australia) Daniel Pappas	1
Sonic Motor Racing Services	Van Diemen RF04	3	(Australia) David Sieders	All
Sonic Motor Racing Services	Van Diemen RF04	4	(Australia) Dean Fiore	All
Project Motorsports	Spectrum 010	5	(Australia) Lee Holdsworth	All
Project Motorsports	Spectrum 010b	7	(New Zealand) Jason Liefting	All
Project Motorsports	Spectrum 09b	9	(Australia) Trent Harrison	8
Bosch Batteries	Spectrum 010	8	(Australia) Anthony Preston	All
Barrie Pinder	Van Diemen RF01	10	(Australia) Barrie Pinder	1
Mid Coast Ford	Van Diemen RF05	11	(Australia) Joel Spychala	All
Toll Freight/Sandover Pinder	Van Diemen RF01	12	(Australia) Michael Henderson	2
JB Motorsport	Van Diemen RF02	13	(Australia) James Bergmuller	1, 3–6, 8
Audi Centre Melbourne	Van Diemen RF01	14	(Australia) Leigh Pyke	1, 7
Nomad Racing	Spectrum 06B	14	(Australia) Glenn McNally	2
Nomad Racing	Spectrum 010	74	(Australia) Mark McNally	All
Ben Guest Motorsport	Van Diemen RF01	14	(Australia) Ben Guest	3, 6
Doulman Industries	Van Diemen RF94	15	(Australia) Grant Doulman	All
HSE Mining/North City Holden	Van Diemen RF01	16	(Australia) Mark Douglas	2
Resorts Racing	Van Diemen RF96	16	(Australia) Sam Sewell	3, 5
Sime Tyres	Van Diemen RF93	17	(Australia) Luke Wood	6
Fastlane Racing	Van Diemen RF92	20	(Australia) Daniel Ricciardo	8
Fastlane Racing	Van Diemen RF04	32	(Australia) Nathan Caratti	All
Fastlane Racing	Van Diemen RF05	36	(Australia) Daniel Elliott	All
Fastlane Racing	Van Diemen RF90	92	(Australia) John McCowan	2
Borland Racing Developments	Van Diemen RF04	21	(Australia) Brett Hobson	All
Borland Racing Developments	Van Diemen RF01	45	(Australia) Ashley Walsh	5, 8
Borland Racing Developments	Spectrum 010	62	(Australia) Andrew Thompson	1–3
Borland Racing Developments	Spectrum 010b	71	(Australia) Paul Laskazeski	4, 6
Perkins Engineering	Van Diemen RF92	22	(Australia) Jack Perkins	1, 7
J.A.R. Racing	Mygale SJ97	23	(Australia) Jarrod Andrews	8
GK Martin	Spectrum 010b	24	(Australia) John Martin	3, 8
Percat Auto	Mygale SJ97	25	(Australia) Nick Percat	1
Adroit Internet Solutions	Spectrum 06b	25	(Australia) Terry Kerr	8
Minda Motorsport	Van Diemen RF01	25	(Australia) Nick Percat	1, 7
Minda Motorsport	Van Diemen RF01	92	(Australia) Taz Douglas	4, 8
O'Brien Motorsport	Van Diemen RF03	26	(Australia) Shannon O'Brien	1–3, 5–8
Stubbies Workwear Racing	Spectrum 09	27	(Australia) Dane Rudolph	3
Stubbies Workwear Racing	Spectrum 09	27	(Australia) Ben Morley	6
Stubbies Workwear Racing	Spectrum 06B	66	(Australia) Derryn Harrison	6
Collex/Davies Craig	Van Diemen RF01	28	(Australia) Cade Southall	8
K-Tec	Van Diemen RF94	31	(Australia) Adrian Corp	2
Cisco Systems	Van Diemen RF03	31	(Australia) Craig Kermond	8
Drew Milne	Van Diemen RF01	33	(Australia) Drew Milne	1
Motorsports Training Australia	Van Diemen RF04	33	(Australia) Tim Berryman	3
Auto Exclusive Perth/B-TYPE	Van Diemen RF90	35	(Australia) Michael Epple	2
Escalate Management	Van Diemen RF93	37	(Australia) Tony LeMessurier	1, 3–5
Escalate Management	Van Diemen RF95	37	(Australia) Tristan Hughes	6, 8
Drew Price Racing	Spectrum 010b	39	(Australia) Shane Price	All
Landscape Development	Van Diemen RF04	40	(Australia) Todd Fiore	8
Marshall Tyres	Van Diemen RF95	41	(Australia) Brad Lowe	6
Jayair/Sanden	Van Diemen RF04	41	(Australia) Tim Blanchard	8
Toshiba Mobile Computers	Van Diemen RF03	42	(Australia) Samantha Reid	1
Toshiba Mobile Computers	Swift SC94	90	(Australia) David Reid	1
Power Solutions	Spectrum 07	45	(Australia) Trent Ulmer	7
G-Force Motorsport	Mygale SJ04	46	(Australia) Dale Wood	1, 3, 8
Chubb Fire/Intel Group	Van Diemen RF01	50	(Australia) Graham Knuckey	1
NIZZA Recruitment Services	Vector MG096	61	(Australia) Romain Krumins	5
Refrigerated Rentals & Sales	Van Diemen RF95	63	(Australia) Martin Swindells	5
Donut King	Van Diemen RF01	72	(Australia) Rachel Smeaton	3–5
Knowledge Plus	Mygale SJ97	84	(Australia) Asher Johnston	1
Subway D.C./Mills Records	Van Diemen RF90	88	(Australia) Justin Locke	2
Yellow Tail	Van Diemen RF01	91	(Australia) Aiden Zanotto	1, 3–4
Tuart Ridge Wines	Van Diemen RF96	94	(Australia) Jason Youd	2
Powerbuilt Tools	Van Diemen RF01	97	(New Zealand) Andy Knight	1, 5
Nexus Racing	Van Diemen RF93	99	(Australia) Damien Flack	5

== Championship calendar ==
The championship was contested over an eight-round series with three races per round.

Round	Circuit	Dates	Supporting	Map
1	(South Australia) Adelaide Street Circuit	17-20 March	V8 Supercar Championship Series	2005 Australian Formula Ford Championship is located in Australia
2	(Western Australia) Wanneroo Raceway	6-8 May	V8 Supercar Championship Series	2005 Australian Formula Ford Championship is located in Australia
3	(New South Wales) Eastern Creek Raceway	27-29 May	V8 Supercar Championship Series	2005 Australian Formula Ford Championship is located in Australia
4	(New South Wales) Eastern Creek Raceway	8-10 July	HPDC V8 Supercar Series	2005 Australian Formula Ford Championship is located in Australia
5	Queensland Raceway	22-24 July	V8 Supercar Championship Series	2005 Australian Formula Ford Championship is located in Australia
6	(New South Wales) Oran Park Raceway	12-14 August	V8 Supercar Championship Series	2005 Australian Formula Ford Championship is located in Australia
7	(South Australia) Mallala Motor Sport Park	19-21 August	HPDC V8 Supercar Series	2005 Australian Formula Ford Championship is located in Australia
8	(Victoria (state)) Sandown Raceway	9-11 September	V8 Supercar Championship Series	2005 Australian Formula Ford Championship is located in Australia

== Season summary ==
Rd	Race	Circuit	Pole position	Fastest lap	Winning driver	Winning team	Round Winner
1	1	(South Australia) Adelaide Street Circuit	(Australia) Daniel Elliott	(Australia) David Sieders	(Australia) Daniel Elliott	Fastlane Racing	(Australia) Daniel Elliott
1	2	(South Australia) Adelaide Street Circuit		(Australia) Daniel Elliott	(Australia) Daniel Elliott	Fastlane Racing	(Australia) Daniel Elliott
1	3	(South Australia) Adelaide Street Circuit		(Australia) Daniel Elliott	(Australia) Daniel Elliott	Fastlane Racing	(Australia) Daniel Elliott
2	1	(Western Australia) Wanneroo Raceway	(Australia) Daniel Elliott	(Australia) Daniel Elliott	(Australia) Daniel Elliott	Fastlane Racing	(Australia) Daniel Elliott
2	2	(Western Australia) Wanneroo Raceway		(Australia) Daniel Elliott	(Australia) Daniel Elliott	Fastlane Racing	(Australia) Daniel Elliott
2	3	(Western Australia) Wanneroo Raceway		(Australia) Daniel Elliott	(Australia) Daniel Elliott	Fastlane Racing	(Australia) Daniel Elliott
3	1	(New South Wales) Eastern Creek Raceway	(Australia) David Sieders	(Australia) Shannon O'Brien	(Australia) Shannon O'Brien	O'Brien Motorsport	(Australia) David Sieders
3	2	(New South Wales) Eastern Creek Raceway		(Australia) Joel Spychala	(New Zealand) Jason Liefting	Project Motorsports	(Australia) David Sieders
3	3	(New South Wales) Eastern Creek Raceway		(Australia) Anthony Preston	(Australia) Shane Price	Drew Price Racing	(Australia) David Sieders
4	1	(New South Wales) Eastern Creek Raceway	(Australia) David Sieders	(New Zealand) Jason Liefting	(Australia) David Sieders	Sonic Motor Racing Services	(Australia) Shane Price
4	2	(New South Wales) Eastern Creek Raceway		(Australia) David Sieders	(Australia) Shane Price	Drew Price Racing	(Australia) Shane Price
4	3	(New South Wales) Eastern Creek Raceway		(Australia) Shane Price	(Australia) Shane Price	Drew Price Racing	(Australia) Shane Price
5	1	Queensland Raceway	(Australia) Daniel Elliott	(Australia) Shannon O'Brien	(Australia) Shannon O'Brien	O'Brien Motorsport	(Australia) Shannon O'Brien
5	2	Queensland Raceway		(Australia) Daniel Elliott	(Australia) Shannon O'Brien	O'Brien Motorsport	(Australia) Shannon O'Brien
5	3	Queensland Raceway		(Australia) Shannon O'Brien	(Australia) Shannon O'Brien	O'Brien Motorsport	(Australia) Shannon O'Brien
6	1	(New South Wales) Oran Park Raceway	(Australia) Brad Lowe	(Australia) Shannon O'Brien	(Australia) Brad Lowe	Marshall Tyres	(Australia) Shannon O'Brien
6	2	(New South Wales) Oran Park Raceway		(Australia) Brad Lowe	(Australia) Shannon O'Brien	O'Brien Motorsport	(Australia) Shannon O'Brien
6	3	(New South Wales) Oran Park Raceway		(Australia) Grant Doulman	(Australia) Shannon O'Brien	O'Brien Motorsport	(Australia) Shannon O'Brien
7	1	(South Australia) Mallala Motor Sport Park	(Australia) Shane Price	(Australia) Shannon O'Brien	(Australia) Shane Price	Drew Price Racing	(Australia) David Sieders
7	2	(South Australia) Mallala Motor Sport Park		(Australia) Daniel Elliott	(Australia) Shane Price	Drew Price Racing	(Australia) David Sieders
7	3	(South Australia) Mallala Motor Sport Park		(Australia) David Sieders	(Australia) David Sieders	Sonic Motor Racing Services	(Australia) David Sieders
8	1	(Victoria (state)) Sandown Raceway	(Australia) John Martin	(Australia) Nathan Caratti	(Australia) John Martin	GK Martin P/L	(Australia) John Martin
8	2	(Victoria (state)) Sandown Raceway		(Australia) Dean Fiore	(Australia) John Martin	GK Martin P/L	(Australia) John Martin
8	3	(Victoria (state)) Sandown Raceway		(Australia) David Sieders	(Australia) Shane Price	Drew Price Racing	(Australia) John Martin

== Points system ==
Championship points were awarded on a 20-16-14-12-10-8-6-4-2-1 basis to the top ten finishers in each race with an additional point awarded to the driver earning pole position for Race 1 at each round.

== Championship standings ==
Pos.	Driver	(South Australia) ADE			(Western Australia) BAR			(New South Wales) EAS1			(New South Wales) EAS2			(Queensland) QUE			(New South Wales) ORA			(South Australia) MAL			(Victoria (state)) SAN			Pts
Pos.	Driver	R1	R2	R3	R1	R2	R3	R1	R2	R3	R1	R2	R3	R1	R2	R3	R1	R2	R3	R1	R2	R3	R1	R2	R3	Pts
1	(Australia) Daniel Elliott	1	1	1	1	1	1	4	4	10	Ret	Ret	3	2	2	2	6	2	3	2	2	6	7	6	10	307
2	(Australia) Shane Price	5	4	2	5	4	9	7	3	1	3	1	1	Ret	7	5	10	15	7	1	1	Ret	4	2	1	260
3	(Australia) David Sieders	3	7	5	6	5	8	3	5	2	1	2	2	7	4	6	15	Ret	16	3	3	1	8	5	Ret	236
4	(Australia) Dean Fiore	4	3	6	Ret	9	6	2	2	14	Ret	6	Ret	3	5	4	9	7	17	Ret	6	2	2	3	7	192
5	(Australia) Shannon O'Brien	11	9	14	3	6	7	1	DSQ	Ret				1	1	1	2	1	1	12	5	4	Ret	DNS	DNS	168
6	(New Zealand) Jason Liefting	15	8	9	4	3	3	5	1	Ret	2	4	4	6	Ret	Ret	4	16	10	9	13	3	11	Ret	Ret	154
7	(Australia) Nathan Caratti	8	5	4	Ret	13	5	17	DSQ	11	4	7	12	4	3	3	13	9	8	5	15	Ret	6	10	Ret	115
8	(Australia) Mark McNally	14	14	11	2	2	2	12	Ret	12	6	Ret	9	Ret	8	7	8	6	Ret	4	4	Ret	9	16	12	106
9	(Australia) Brett Hobson	2	2	3	9	11	17	Ret	12	6	5	5	7	5	Ret	DNS	16	Ret	13	Ret	10	9	Ret	DNS	Ret	95
10	(Australia) John Martin							13	8	3													1	1	4	71
11	(Australia) Lee Holdsworth	16	17	13	8	10	11	10	11	5	Ret	3	5	11	Ret	8	17	12	9	7	7	7				67
12	(Australia) Joel Spychala	10	12	Ret	7	8	10	6	6	8	7	9	8	9	6	9	11	11	14	Ret	14	10	15	18	19	59
13	(Australia) Paul Laskaseski										Ret	8	6				3	4	2							52
14	(Australia) Grant Doulman	21	Ret	19	10	12	Ret	16	DNS	16	8	Ret	11	10	10	10	5	5	5	6	9	Ret	Ret	12	Ret	48
15	(Australia) Brad Lowe																1	3	4							47
=	(Australia) Dale Wood	12	13	Ret				11	9	7													5	4	2	47
17	(Australia) Andrew Thompson	6	6	7	Ret	7	4	9	Ret	9																46
18	(Australia) Ben Guest							8	7	4							7	8	6							42
19	(Australia) Anthony Preston	Ret	10	8	Ret	15	12	18	10	19	9	Ret	10	8	17	Ret	14	13	12	Ret	8	5	19	13	6	33
20	(Australia) Jack Perkins	13	15	12																Ret	12	8	3	15	5	28
21	(Australia) Cade Southall																						DNS	11	3	14
22	(Australia) Daniel Pappas	7	11	10																						7
=	(Australia) Terry Kerr																						10	7	11	7
24	(Australia) Tristan Hughes													14	9	Ret	20	Ret	Ret	10	17	11	Ret	Ret	9	5
25	(Australia) Trent Ulmer																			8	11	12				4
=	(Australia) Taz Douglas																						13	8	18	4
=	(Australia) Todd Fiore																						Ret	DNS	8	4
28	(New Zealand) Andy Knight	9	Ret	15										12	Ret	DNS										2
=	(Australia) Ben Morley																12	10	11							2
=	(Australia) Tim Blanchard																						14	9	Ret	2
31	(Australia) Tony LeMessurier	20	19	21				19	17	18	10	11	14													1
=	(Australia) James Bergmuller	25	Ret	Ret				Ret	Ret	Ret	11	10	13	17	12	12	18	Ret	Ret				Ret	DNS	Ret	1
-	(Australia) Asher Johnston	17	20	16																						0
-	(Australia) Samantha Reid	18	23	20																						0
-	(Australia) Graham Knuckey	19	22	Ret																						0
-	(Australia) David Reid	22	21	18																						0
-	(Australia) Leigh Pyke	23	18	17																11	Ret	14				0
-	(Australia) Drew Milne	24	24	23																						0
-	(Australia) Barrie Pinder	Ret	25	22																						0
-	(Australia) Aiden Zanotto	Ret	16	Ret																						0
-	(Australia) Nick Percat	Ret	Ret	Ret																Ret	16	13				0
-	(Australia) Justin Locke				11	Ret	DNS																			0
-	(Australia) Michael Epple				12	Ret	DNS																			0
-	(Australia) Adrian Corp				13	17	13																			0
-	(Australia) Jason Youd				14	Ret	16																			0
-	(Australia) Glenn McNally				15	16	14																			0
-	(Australia) Mark Douglas				Ret	14	Ret																			0
-	(Australia) Michael Henderson				Ret	DNS	DNS																			0
-	(Australia) John McCowan				Ret	Ret	15																			0
-	(Australia) Sam Sewell							15	15	17				13	15	Ret										0
-	(Australia) Aidan Zanotto							14	14	13																0
-	(Australia) Dane Rudolph							20	13	15																0
-	(Australia) Tim Berryman							21	16	Ret																0
-	(Australia) Rachel Smeaton							22	18	20	12	Ret	15	19	16	14										0
-	(Australia) Trent Usher													15	13	11										0
-	(Australia) Damien Flack													16	11	13										0
-	(Australia) Roman Krumins													18	14	Ret										0
-	(Australia) Martin Swindells													Ret	DSQ	Ret										0
-	(Australia) Ashley Walsh													Ret	DNS	DNS							12	14	Ret	0
-	(Australia) Derryn Harrison																19	17	18							0
-	(Australia) Luke Wood																21	14	15							0
-	(Australia) Jarrod Andrews																						21	20	17	0
-	(Australia) Brett Holdsworth																						20	21	15	0
-	(Australia) Daniel Ricciardo																						17	Ret	16	0
-	(Australia) Craig Kermond																						16	17	13	0
-	(Australia) Trent Harrison																						18	19	14	0
Pos.	Driver	(South Australia) ADE			(Western Australia) BAR			(New South Wales) EAS1			(New South Wales) EAS2			(Queensland) QUE			(New South Wales) ORA			(South Australia) MAL			(Victoria (state)) SAN			Pts

=== Notes ===
- All cars were required to comply with Formula Ford regulations as published by CAMS. These regulations specified the use of a Ford 1600cc crossflow engine.
- Shannon O'Brien was excluded from Round 3 and suspended from Round 4 for technical infringements.
- Shane Price was penalised 10 championship points as a result of an incident in Round 3.
- Nathan Caratti was penalised 2 championship points as a result of an incident in Round 4.
- Anthony Preston was penalised 2 championship points as a result of an incident in Round 4.
- The table shows nett points after these penalties were applied.
