= Mark McNally (racing driver) =

Australian racing driver (born 1981)

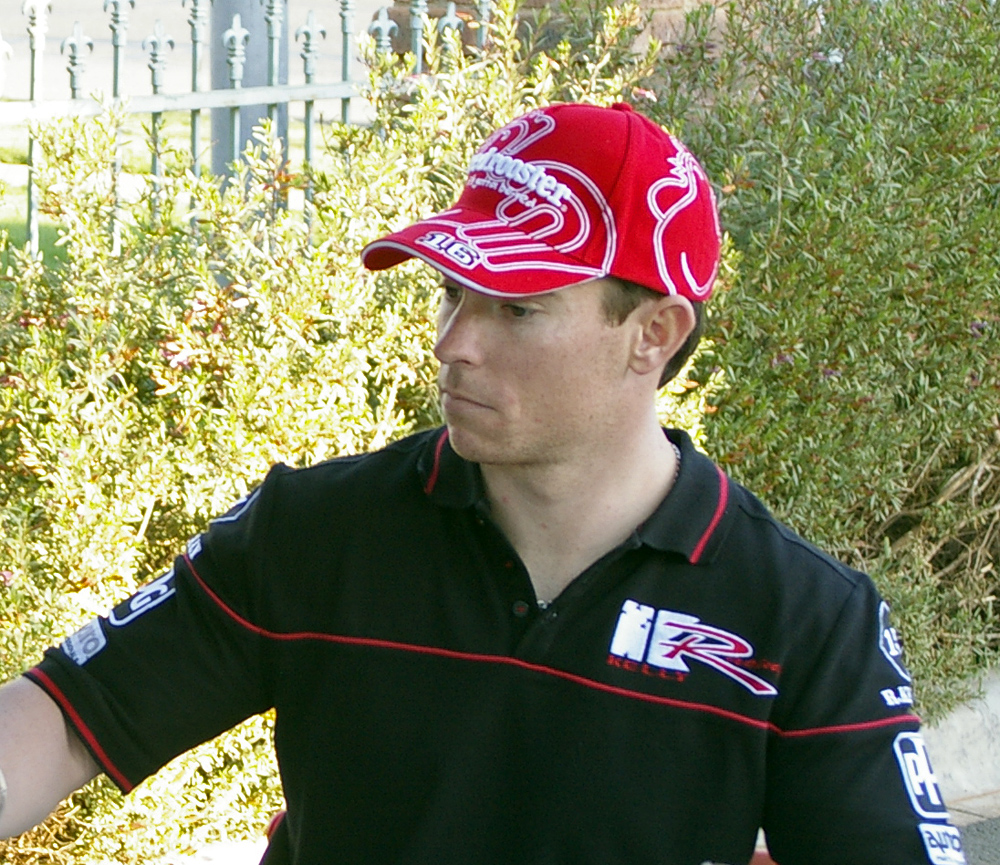
- McNally in 2009
- Nationality: (Australia) Australian
- Born: Mark Daniel McNally; 23 November 1981 (age 44) Perth, Western Australia

V8 Supercars
- Years active: 2009
- Teams: Kelly Racing
- Starts: 9
- Best finish: 30th in 2009 V8 Supercar Championship Series

Previous series
- 2001-05 2005 2006-09 2009: West.Aust. Formula Ford; Australian Formula Ford; Fujitsu V8 Supercar Series; V8 Supercars

Mark Daniel McNally (born 23 November 1981) is a former Australian racing driver. He made his V8 Supercar debut at the 2009 Dunlop Townsville 400.

== Career ==
McNally, the eldest of three racing brothers, began his circuit racing career at Barbagallo Raceway in the Western Australian Formula Ford Championship racing a Spectrum 06. After peaking in 2003 as runner up in the state championship McNally moved on to the Australian Formula Ford Championship in 2005, finishing eighth in points. In 2006, McNally made his debut in the Fujitsu V8 Supercar Series with Tony D'Alberto Racing finishing the season 23rd in points and 2007 one spot higher in 22nd. For the 2008 Fujitsu V8 Supercar Series, his car was run by Brad Jones Racing and in 2009 McNally made with V8 Supercar Championship debut for Kelly Racing at the 2009 Dunlop Townsville 400 replacing Dale Wood in the #16 Commodore for the rest of the 2009 season. McNally was unable to find a drive for 2010 season.

== Career results ==
| Season | Series | Position | Car | Team |
|---|---|---|---|---|
| 2001 | Western Australia Formula Ford Championship | 19th | Spectrum 06 Ford | |
| 2002 | Western Australia Formula Ford Championship | 5th | Spectrum 06 Ford | |
| 2003 | Western Australia Formula Ford Championship | 2nd | Spectrum 06 Ford | |
| 2005 | Australian Formula Ford Championship | 8th | Van Diemen RF05 Ford | Nomad Racing / Fastlane |
| 2005 | Western Australia Formula Ford Championship | 13th | Van Diemen RF05 Ford | |
| 2006 | Fujitsu V8 Supercar Series | 23rd | Holden VY Commodore | Tony D'Alberto Racing |
| 2007 | Fujitsu V8 Supercar Series | 22nd | Holden VZ Commodore | West Coast Racing |
| 2008 | Fujitsu V8 Supercar Series | 10th | Holden VZ Commodore | Brad Jones Racing |
| 2009 | Fujitsu V8 Supercar Series | 26th | Holden VZ Commodore | Brad Jones Racing |
| 2009 | V8 Supercar Championship Series | 30th | Holden VE Commodore | Kelly Racing |

=== Complete Bathurst 1000 results ===
| Year | Team | Car | Co-driver | Position | Laps |
|---|---|---|---|---|---|
| 2009 | Kelly Racing | Holden Commodore VE | (Australia) Tony Ricciardello | 17th | 160 |
