= Holden Commodore (VF) =

Australian full-size car

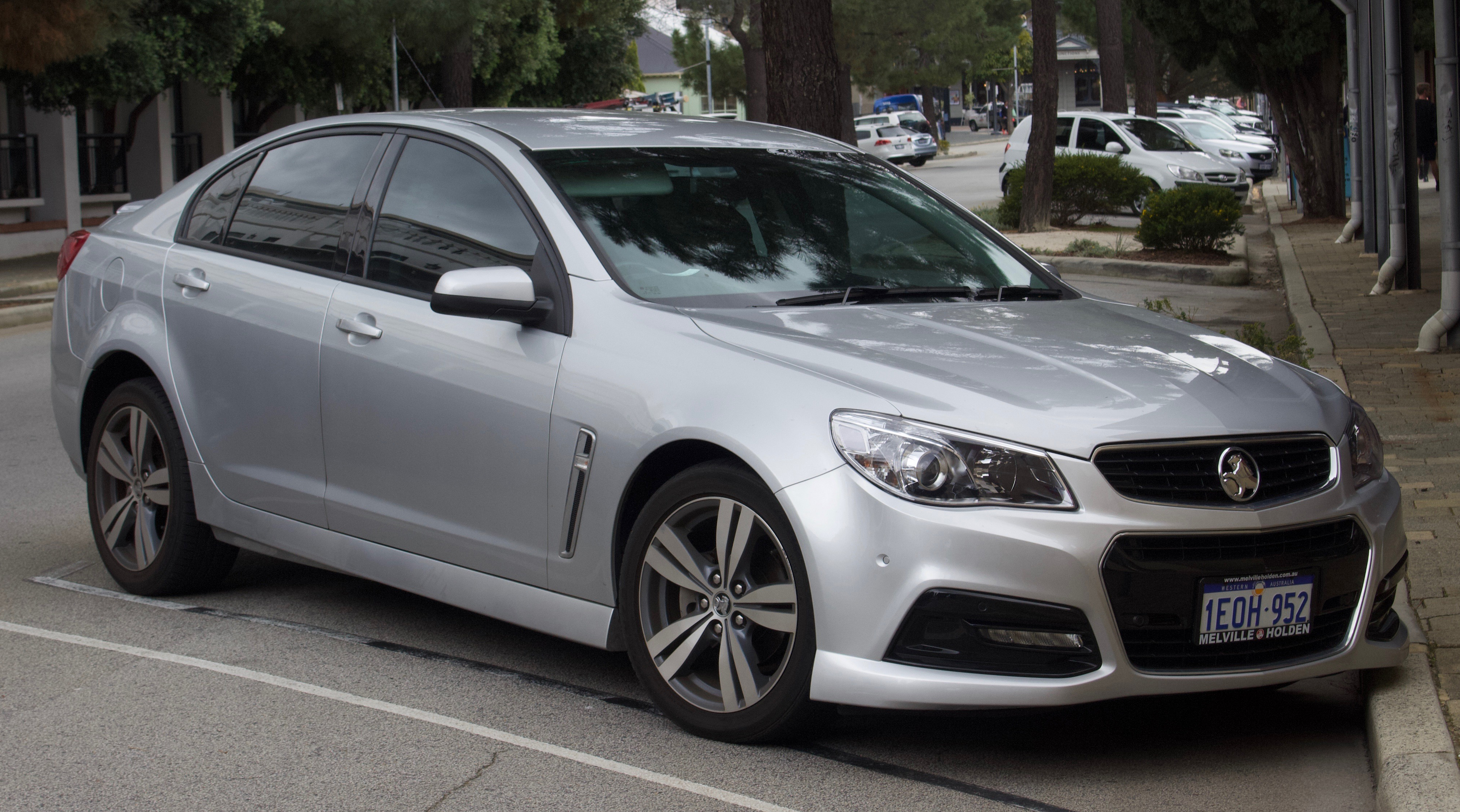

Overview
- Manufacturer: Holden
- Also called: Holden Calais; Holden Ute; HSV Gen-F; Chevrolet SS (United States); Vauxhall VXR8 (United Kingdom)
- Production: June 2013 – October 2017
- Assembly: Australia: Adelaide, South Australia (Elizabeth)
- Designer: Justin Thompson (2008)

Body and chassis
- Class: Full-size
- Body style: 2-door coupé utility 4-door sedan 5-door station wagon
- Layout: Front-engine, rear-wheel drive
- Platform: GM Zeta
- Related: Chevrolet Camaro (fifth generation); Chevrolet Caprice; Holden Caprice (WN)

Powertrain
- Engine: 3.0 L LFW V6; 3.6 L LFX V6; 6.0 L L77 V8; 6.2 L LS3 V8; 6.2 L LSA V8 (HSV only); 6.2 L LS9 V8 (HSV only)
- Transmission: 6-speed GM 6L45-E automatic 6-speed GM 6L80-E automatic 6-speed GM 6L90-E automatic (LSA only); 6-speed Aisin AY6 manual 6-speed Tremec TR-6060 manual

Dimensions
- Wheelbase: 2,915 mm (114.8 in) (sedan & wagon); 3,009 mm (118.5 in) (utility)
- Length: 4,947–4,966 mm (194.8–195.5 in) (sedan); 4,919–4,939 mm (193.7–194.4 in) (wagon); 5,062–5,083 mm (199.3–200.1 in) (utility)
- Width: 1,898 mm (74.7 in)
- Height: 1,471 mm (57.9 in) (sedan); 1,474 mm (58.0 in) (wagon); 1,494 mm (58.8 in) (utility)
- Kerb weight: 1,622–1,780 kg (3,576–3,924 lb) (sedan); 1,717–1,866 kg (3,785–4,114 lb) (wagon); 1,656–1,733 kg (3,651–3,821 lb) (utility)

Chronology
- Predecessor: Holden Commodore (VE)
- Successor: Holden Commodore (ZB)

The Holden Commodore (VF) is a full-size car that was produced from June 2013 to October 2017 by Holden, the former Australian subsidiary of General Motors. It was available under the luxury Holden Calais nameplate; utility models were sold as the Holden Ute.

It succeeded the VE series, and was the second iteration of the fourth generation of the Holden Commodore. It was the last model in the series to be manufactured in Australia. It was offered as a sedan and wagon. The long-wheelbase Holden Caprice (WN) released in 2013.

From 2013 to 2017 the VF Commodore was rebadged in the United States as the Chevrolet SS. Holden Special Vehicles (HSV) sold VF Commodore-based models in the Gen-F series, HSV also sold models in the United Kingdom under Vauxhall VXR8 range.

In December 2013, General Motors (GM) announced that it would discontinue all Australian production in 2017.

== Development ==
The VF Commodore was built on the GM Zeta platform, first used by the VE Commodore. The VF was an evolution of the VE, with several visual changes. The VF featured new styling at the front and rear; changes included altered headlights, altered tail lamps (on sedans only), alterations to the plastic of the intake and grille and the use of a lip-spoiler instead of a rear wing on the performance models. The body shell, windows, doors, mirrors and roof were all carried over from the VE. The wheelbase and track also remain unchanged. The long-wheelbase Holden Caprice (WN) released in June 2013.

The interior underwent major changes, with switches such as the boot lid release being relocated from the glovebox to the doors and the fitting of an electronic handbrake. All models were fitted with an eight-inch touch screen in the centre console, with keyless entry and auto-park assist also standard across all models. Optional features included: a head-up display on the windscreen, forward and rear collision warning systems, blind spot monitors and a lane departure warning system. The VF used an electric power steering system, replacing the hydraulic system used on previous Commodores, improving fuel economy at the expense of steering feel.

The majority of the testing for the VF was completed in Australia but it was also driven in Germany, the Middle East, North America and Sweden. Show-car versions of the SS V and the Calais V were unveiled to the public on 10 February 2013, with the first pre-production models completed in April 2013.

== Safety ==
The VF achieved five stars in the ANCAP safety ratings. On top of the ratings tests, the VF was found to have good whiplash protection for occupants, though pedestrian protection was classified as marginal, with the car scoring 15.41 of a possible 36 points in this area.

ANCAP test results* Holden Commodore (2013)
Test	Score
Overall	5 /5 stars
Frontal offset	14.06/16
Side impact	16/16
Pole	2/2
Seat belt reminders	3/3
Whiplash protection	Good
Pedestrian protection	Marginal
Electronic stability control	Standard

In May 2014, Holden recalled nearly 42,000 VF and WN Caprice models after a potential problem with the front seatbelts was identified. It was found that the pretensioner wiring harness for the seatbelts could make contact with part of the buckle assembly, leading to premature wearing of the wiring harness which could disable the pretensioner system in the event of an accident. The VF was recalled again a month later, when it was found that the drive gear for the windscreen wiper motor could fail. LPG models were recalled in July after it was identified that the feed hose could develop a slow leak at the end of the vehicle's lifetime, creating a (low) risk of fire.

== Powertrains ==
The VF uses the same engines as the VE, with minor alterations to improve performance and fuel efficiency, while the automatic gearbox was redesigned to give more appropriate gear selections. The VE's E85 compatibility was carried forward to the VF V8 engines, and the V6 engine until it was dropped in the 2015MY. Fuel economy has also been improved by the use of aluminium body panels and components, leading to the VF being 43 kilograms (95 lb) lighter than the VE, and the electric power steering system. The new styling has also improved the aerodynamic efficiency, with the coefficient of drag dropping from 0.33 to 0.30. As a result, fuel consumption has dropped by between three and eight percent depending on the engine and specification level. Starting with the VF II 2015, the 6.0-litre L77 was replaced by the 6.2-litre LS3. The VF II model also saw the discontinuation of the LPG versions of the Commodore.

Eng. disp.; configuration	Engine	Power (Note: Power figures are measured in accordance with the ECE standard.)	Torque	Transmission (Note: Manual transmission not offered for the Wagon body style.)	Fuel type	Fuel consumption (sedan) (Note: Fuel consumption figures are measured in accordance with the ADR 81/02 standard. Fuel economy figures may differ between body styles and specification levels.)	Production
3.0 L (2,997 cc); V6	SIDI (LFW)	189 kW (253 hp)	290 N⋅m (214 lbf⋅ft)	6-speed GM 6L50 transmission automatic	Petrol	8.3 L/100 km (28.3 mpg_{‑US})	2013–2017
3.6 L (3,564 cc); V6	SIDI (LFX)	210 kW (282 hp)	350 N⋅m (258 lbf⋅ft)	6-speed Aisin AY6 manual	Petrol	9.0 L/100 km (26.1 mpg_{‑US})	2013–2017
3.6 L (3,564 cc); V6	SIDI (LFX)	210 kW (282 hp)	350 N⋅m (258 lbf⋅ft)	6-speed GM 6L45-E automatic	Petrol	9.0 L/100 km (26.1 mpg_{‑US})	2013–2017
3.6 L (3,564 cc); V6	LPG (LWR)	180 kW (241 hp)	320 N⋅m (236 lbf⋅ft)	6-speed GM 6L45-E automatic	LPG	11.5 L/100 km (20.5 mpg_{‑US})	2013–2015
6.0 L (5,967 cc); V8	Generation 4 Alloy (L77)	270 kW (362 hp)	530 N⋅m (391 lbf⋅ft)	6-speed Tremec TR-6060 manual	Petrol	11.5 L/100 km (20.5 mpg_{‑US})	2013–2015
6.0 L (5,967 cc); V8	Generation 4 Alloy (AFM) (L77)	260 kW (349 hp)	510 N⋅m (376 lbf⋅ft)	6-speed GM 6L80-E automatic	Petrol	11.5 L/100 km (20.5 mpg_{‑US})	2013–2015
6.2 L (6,162 cc); V8	Generation 4 Alloy (LS3)	304 kW (408 hp)	570 N⋅m (420 lbf⋅ft)	6-speed Tremec TR-6060 manual or 6-speed GM 6L80-E automatic	Petrol	12.9 L/100 km (18.2 mpg_{‑US})	2015–2017

== Models ==
=== Commodore Evoke ===
The Evoke was the entry-level nameplate, replacing both the Berlina and Omega. It used the 3.0-litre SIDI V6 engine, with an optional 3.6-litre LPG-powered V6. It was only available with an automatic transmission. The central console display was increased in size from 6.5 to 8 inches (17 to 20 cm), featuring a single-CD player, compatibility with MP3 and iPod and mobile phone integration. The audio, navigation and mobile phone controls all featured voice recognition technology. Safety features included six airbags, traction control and ABS. The Evoke came with 16-inch wheels.

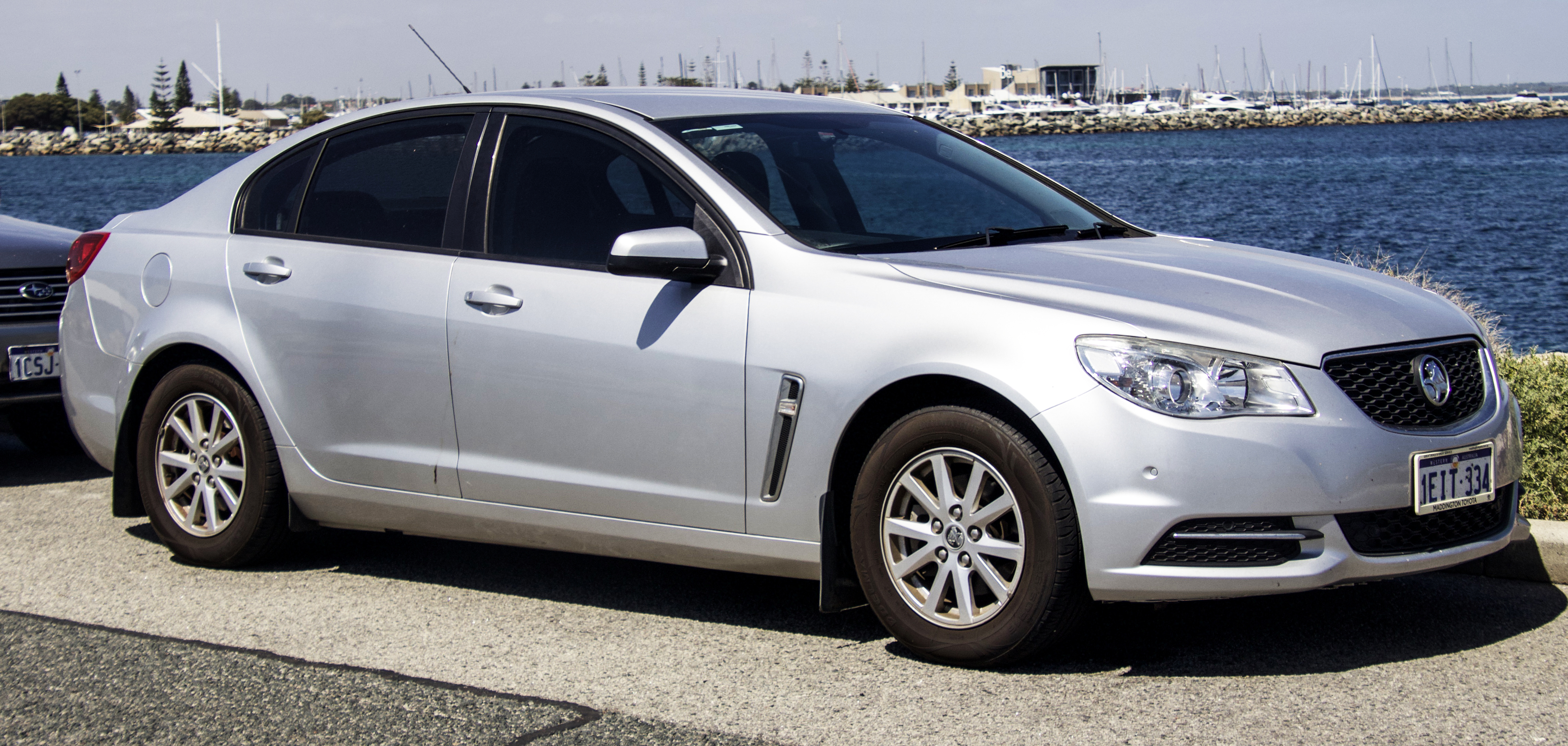
Commodore Evoke sedan

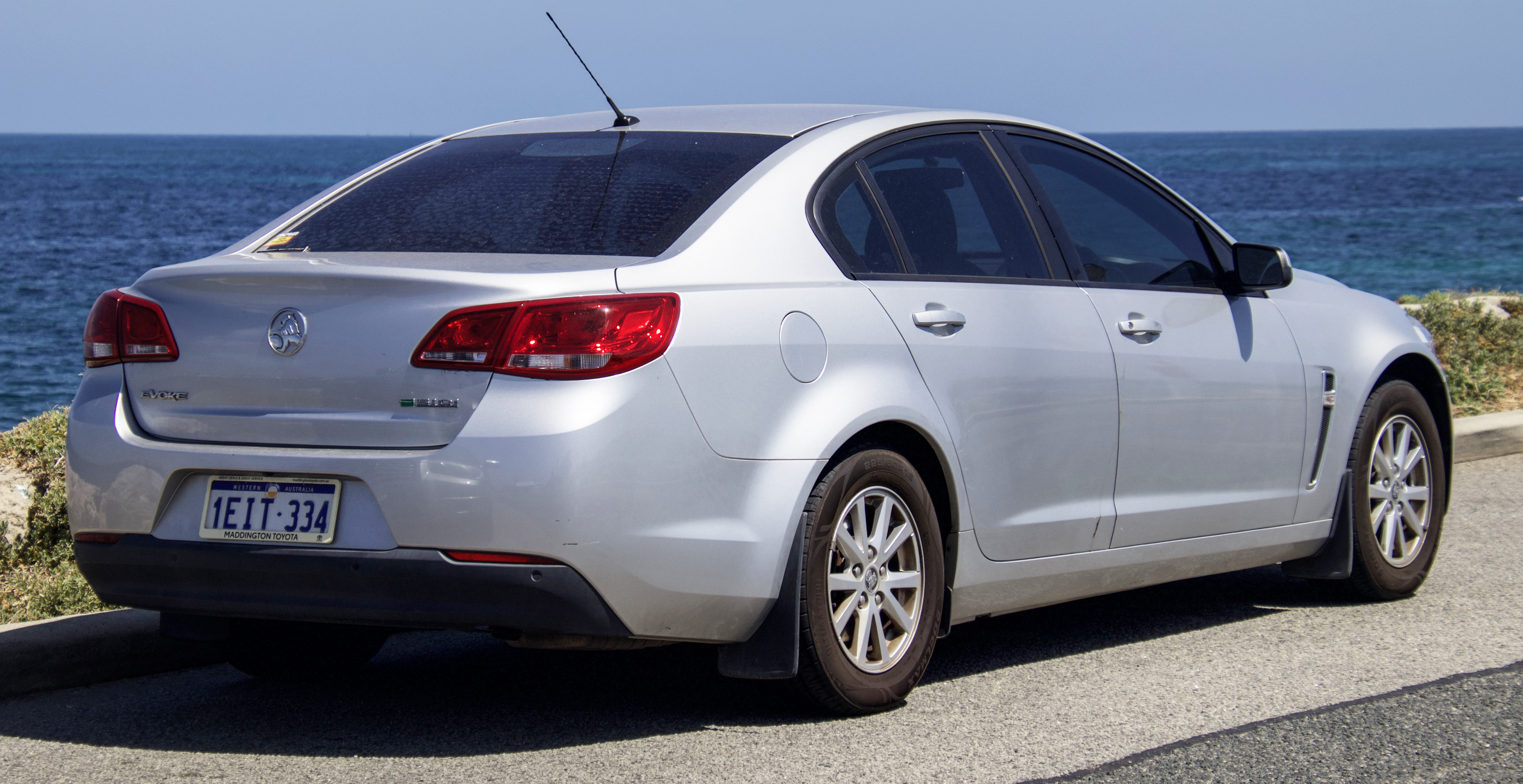
Commodore Evoke sedan

=== Commodore SV6 ===
The SV6 was the sports V6 nameplate. It used the 3.6-litre SIDI V6, with an optional 3.6-litre LPG V6. It was available with both manual and automatic transmissions. It featured a sports bodykit, LED running lights, a lip spoiler, FE2 suspension and 18-inch alloy wheels. The interior fittings are sports seats with suede/leather trim, rear arm rest, leather steering wheel and gear shift lever.

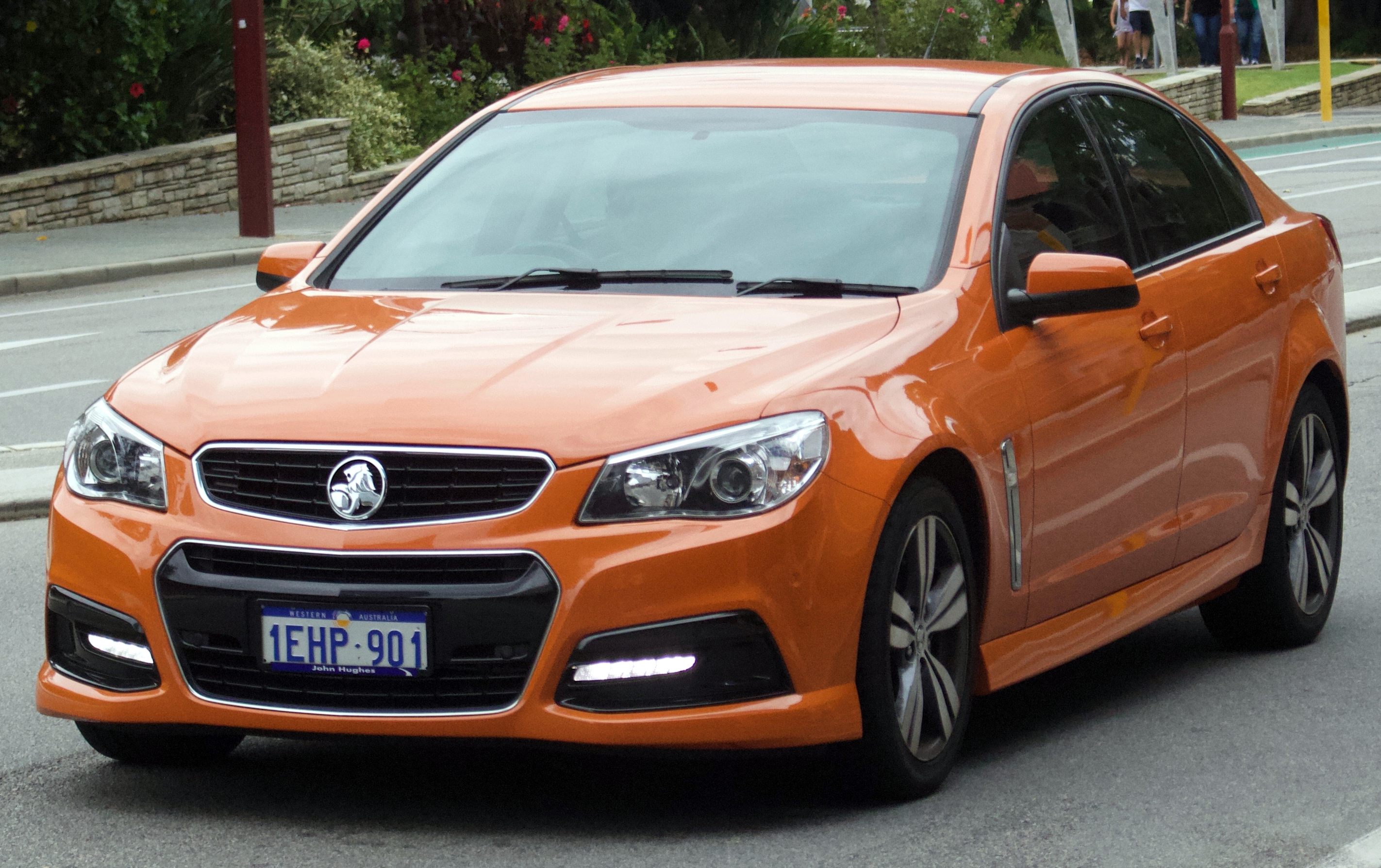
Holden Commodore SV6 (VF)

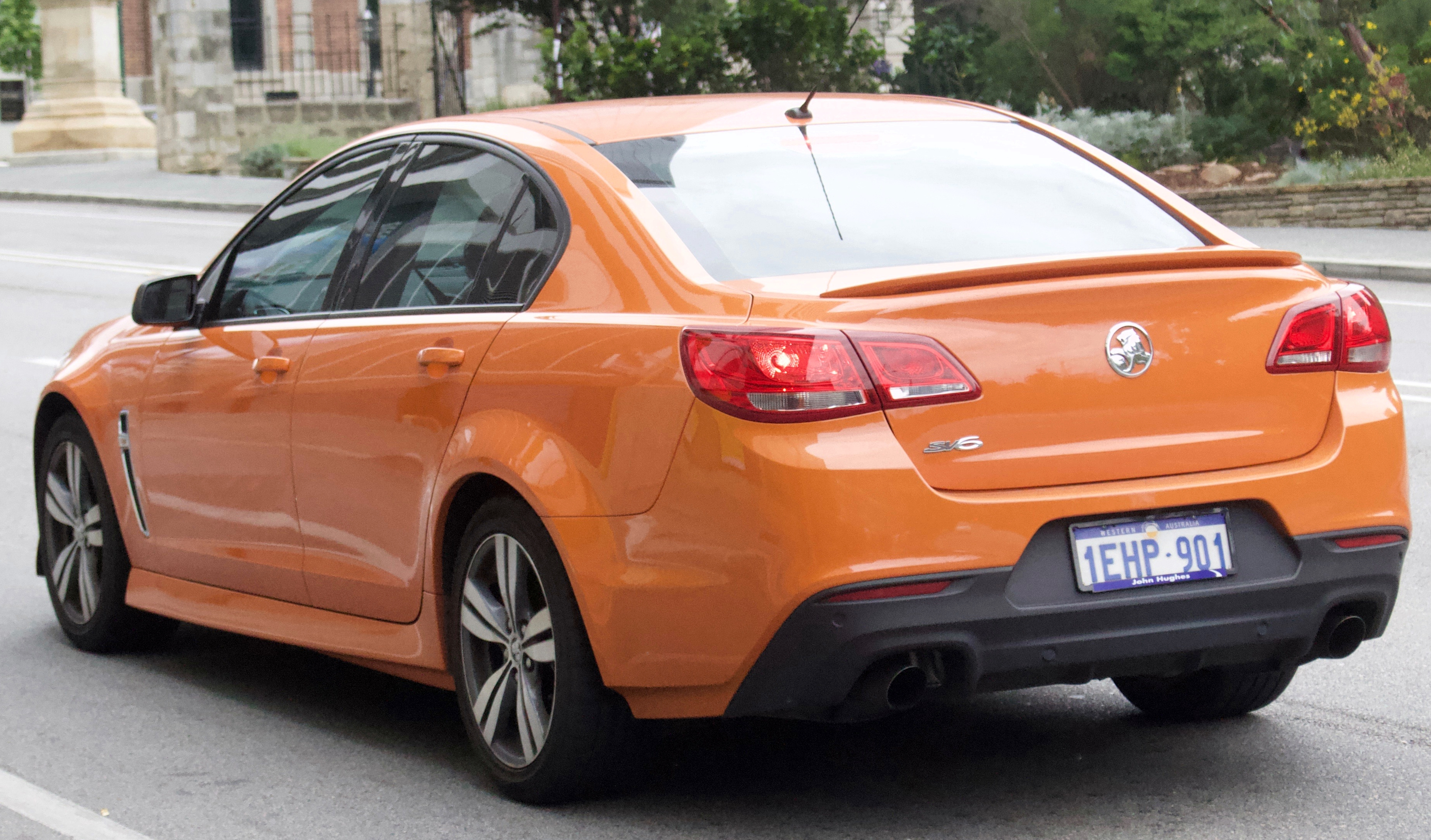
Holden Commodore SV6 (VF)

=== Commodore SS, SS V and SS V Redline ===
The SS was the sports sedan nameplate. It was based on the SV6. It used a 6.0-litre L77 V8 engine, replaced by the 6.2-litre LS3 V8 engine in the Series II. The SS-V featured 19-inch wheels, fog lights, leather seats, an enhanced instrument display, satellite navigation system. The SS V Redline featured improved brakes and suspension, more collision senors, launch control in the manual, sunroof, and Bose audio.

Across the SS range the Sportwagon was only available with an automatic transmission.

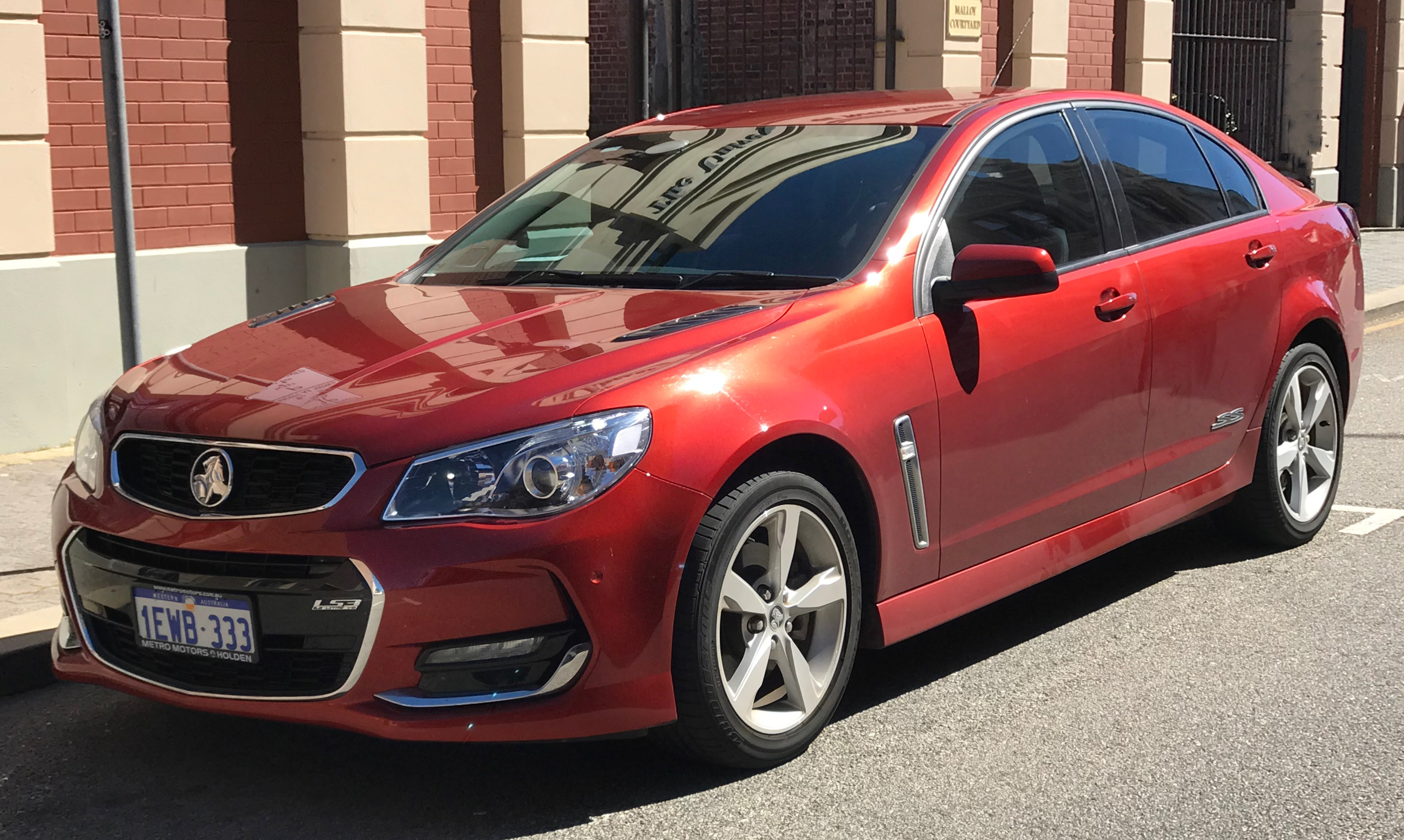
Holden Commodore SS (VF)

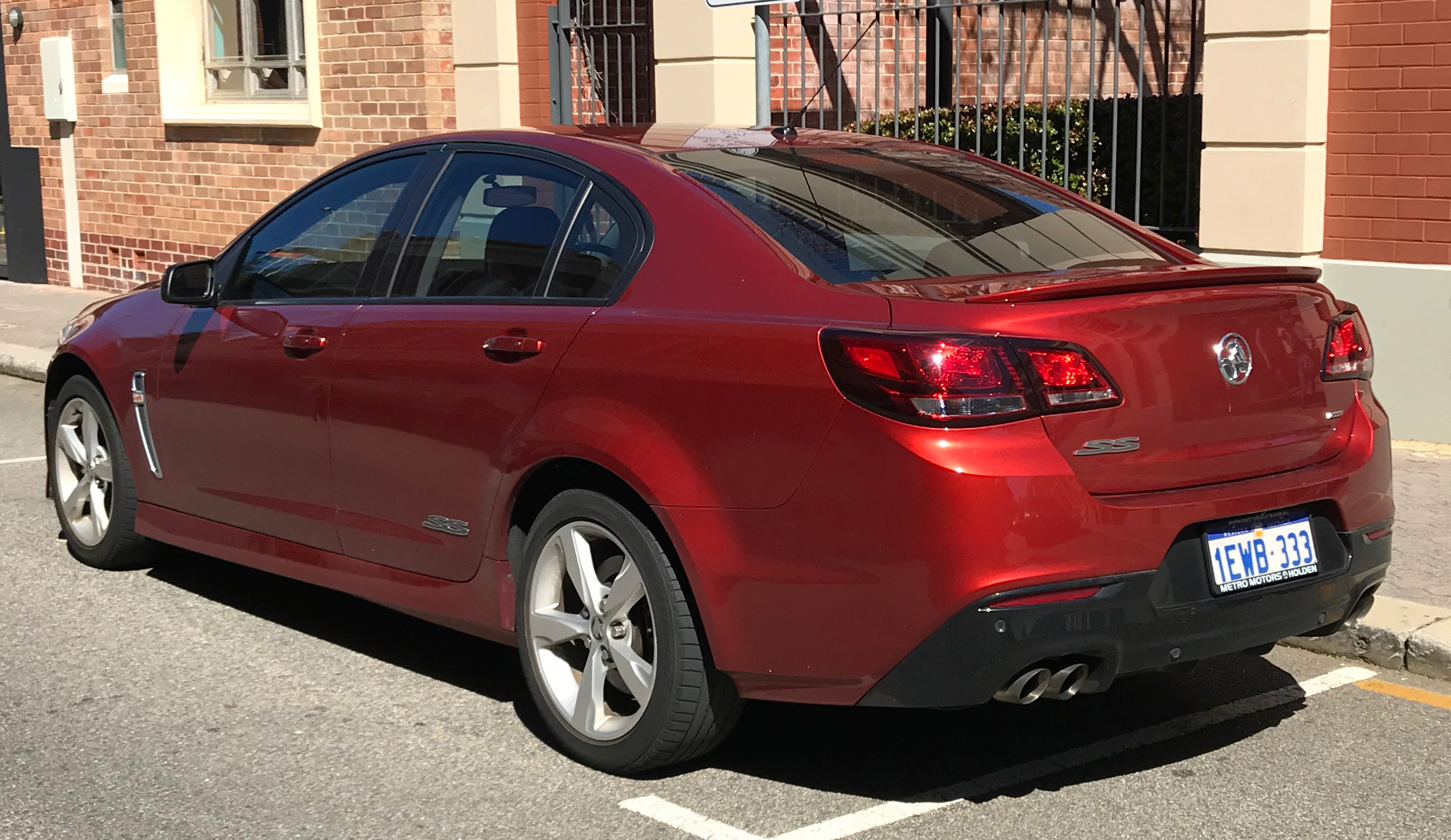
Holden Commodore SS (VF)

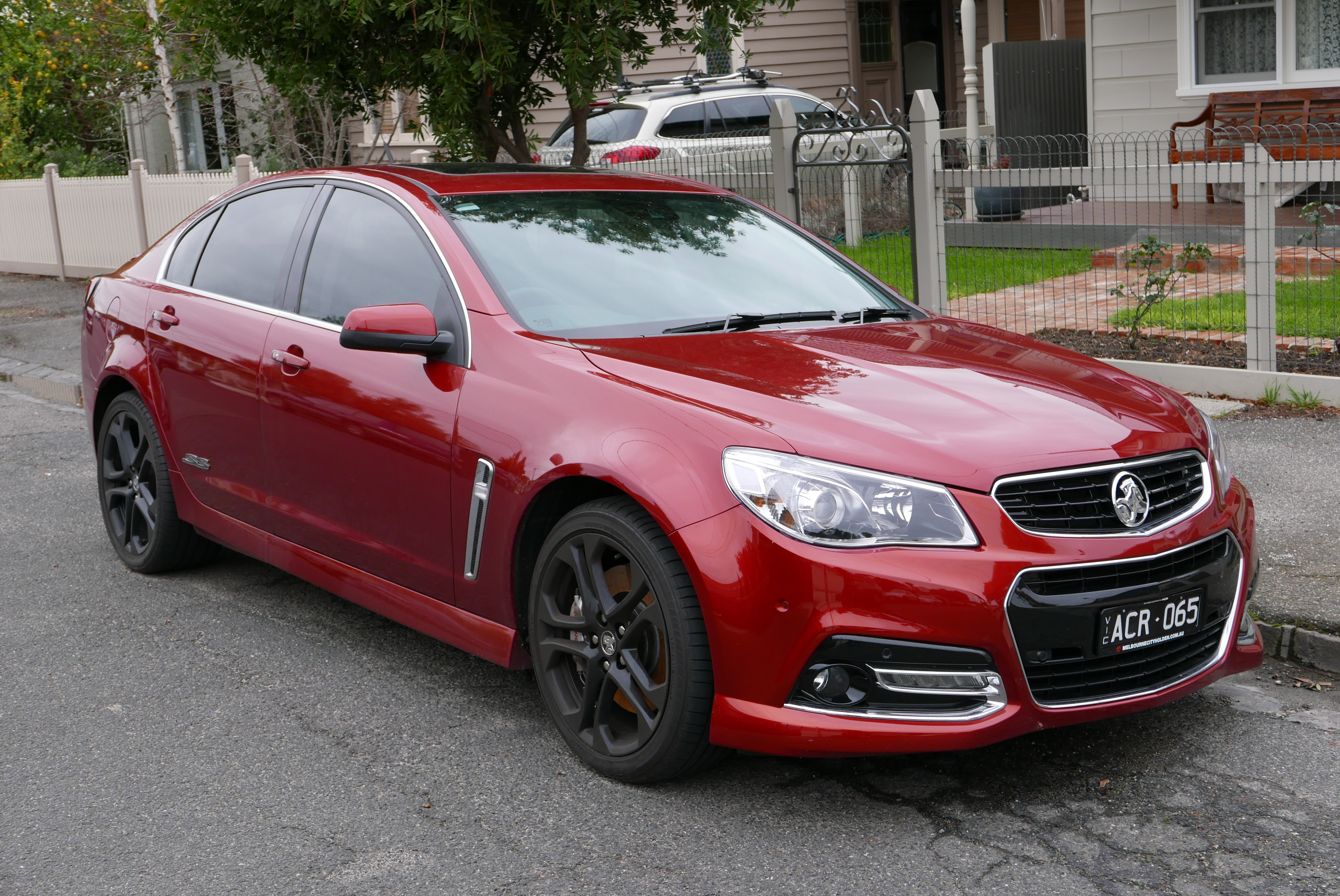
Commodore SS V Redline sedan (VF)

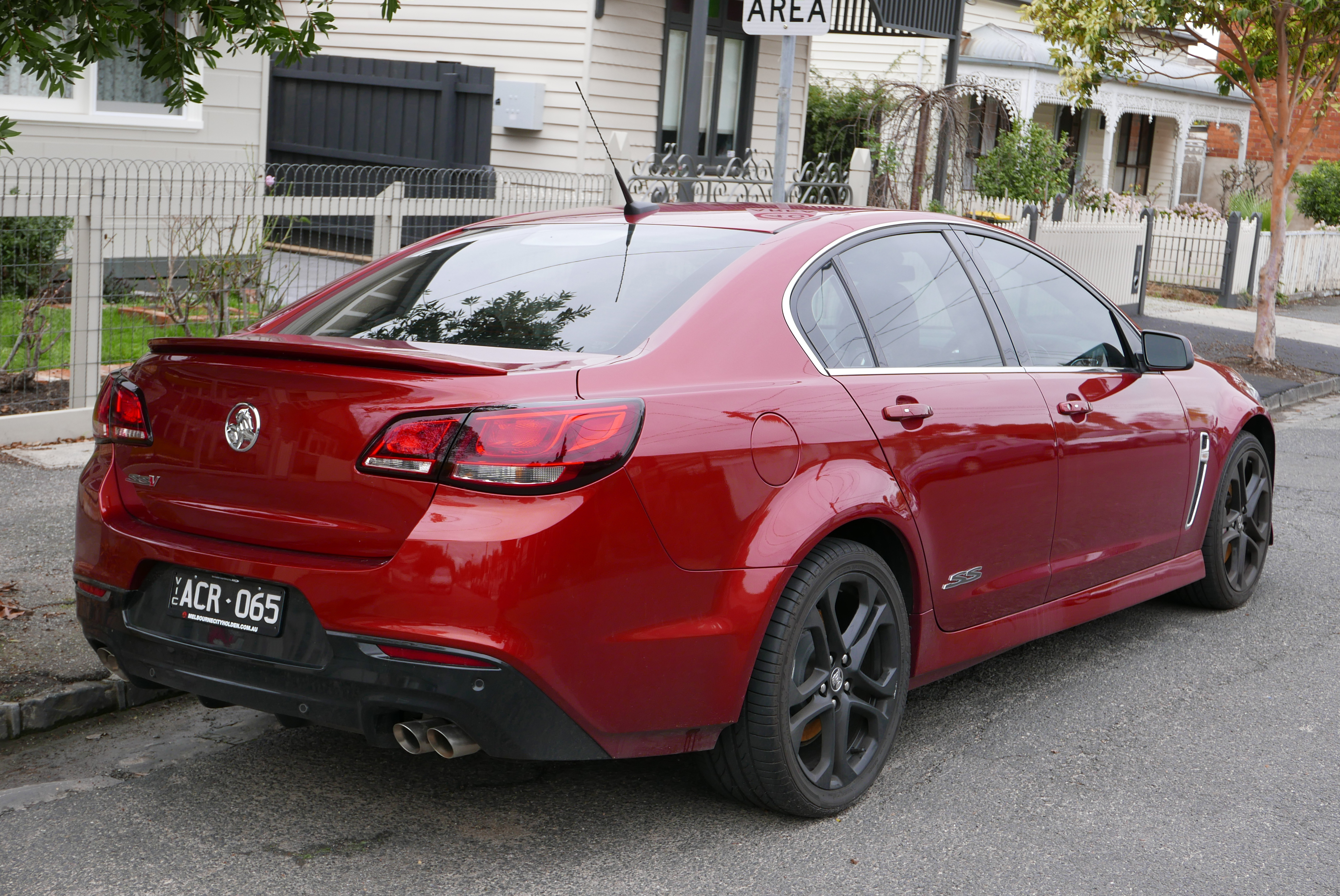
Commodore SS V Redline sedan (VF)

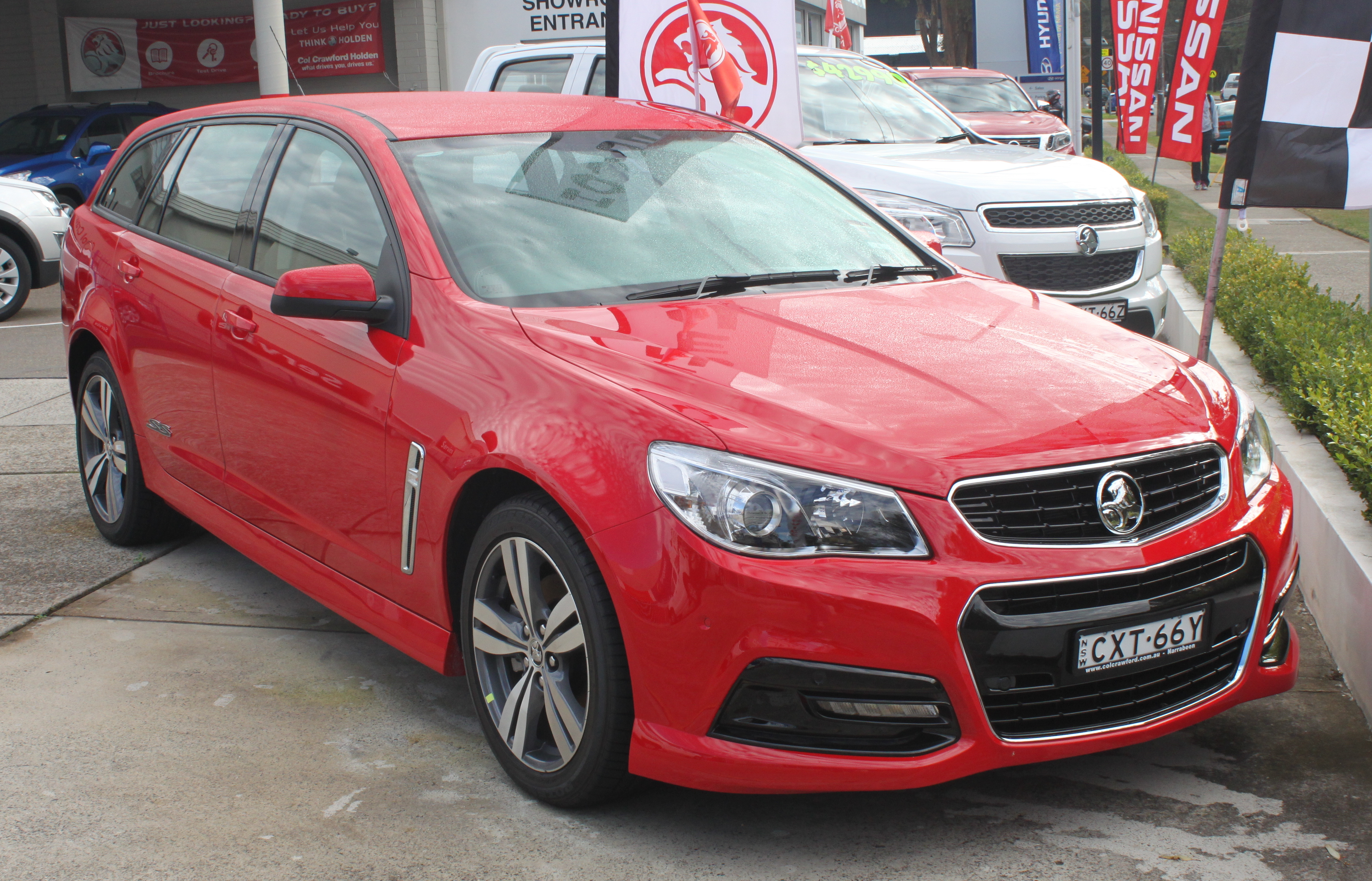
Commodore SS wagon (VF)

=== Calais and Calais V ===
The Calais and Calais V used the 3.6-litre SIDI V6, The 6.0-litre L77 V8 was optional in the Calais V, replaced by the 6.2-litre LS3 V8 in Series II. Both models were only available with an automatic transmission. The models featured chrome highlights in the interior and exterior, leather seats and 18-inch wheels, and optional limited slip differential. The Calais V featured a satellite navigation system, parking assist, side intrusion alert, lane departure warning, forward collision alert, self parking,. The Calais V sedan featured a sunroof, 9-speaker Bose audio, and optional Light Titanium Leather seating.

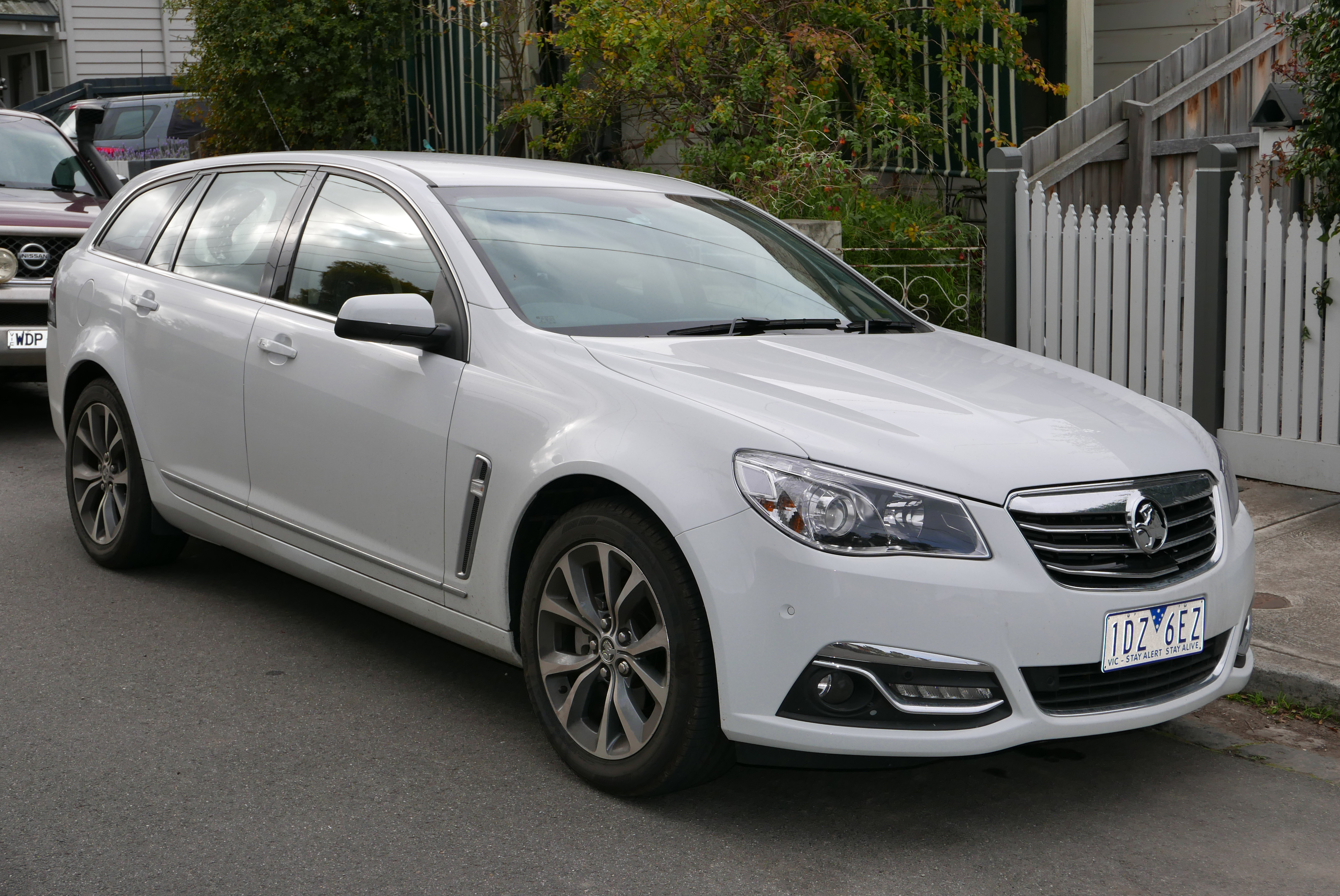
Calais Sportwagon

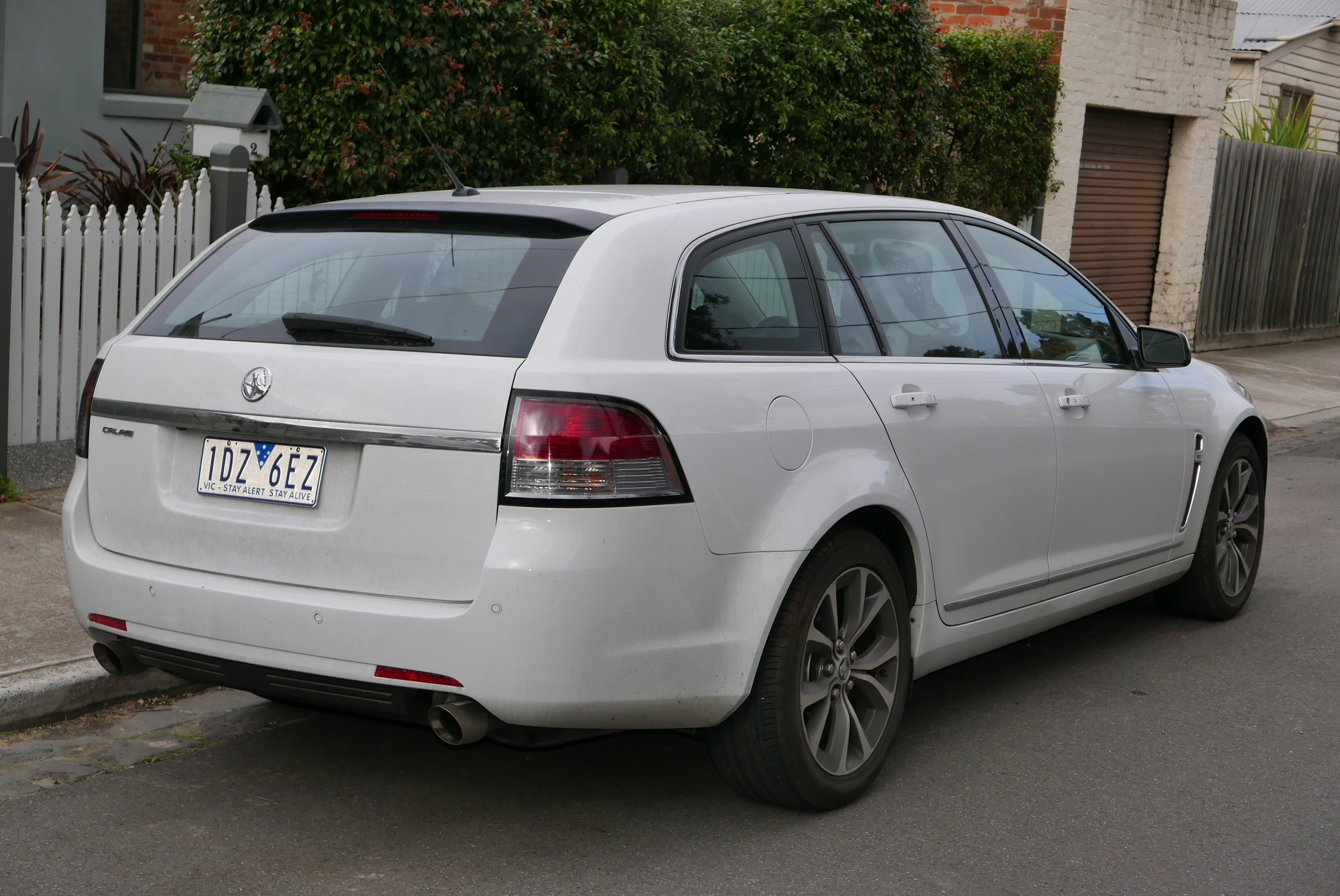
Calais Sportwagon

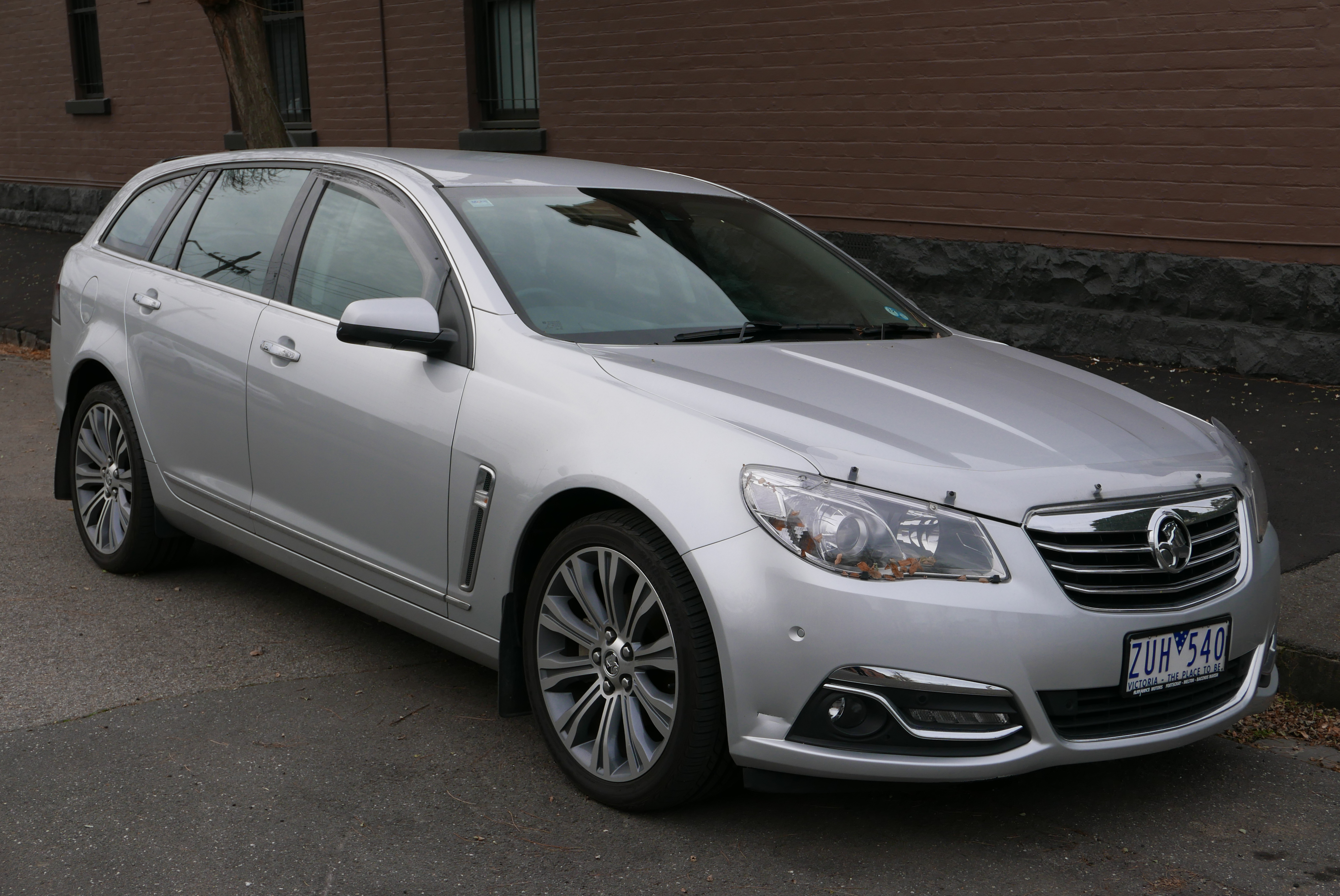
Calais V Sportwagon

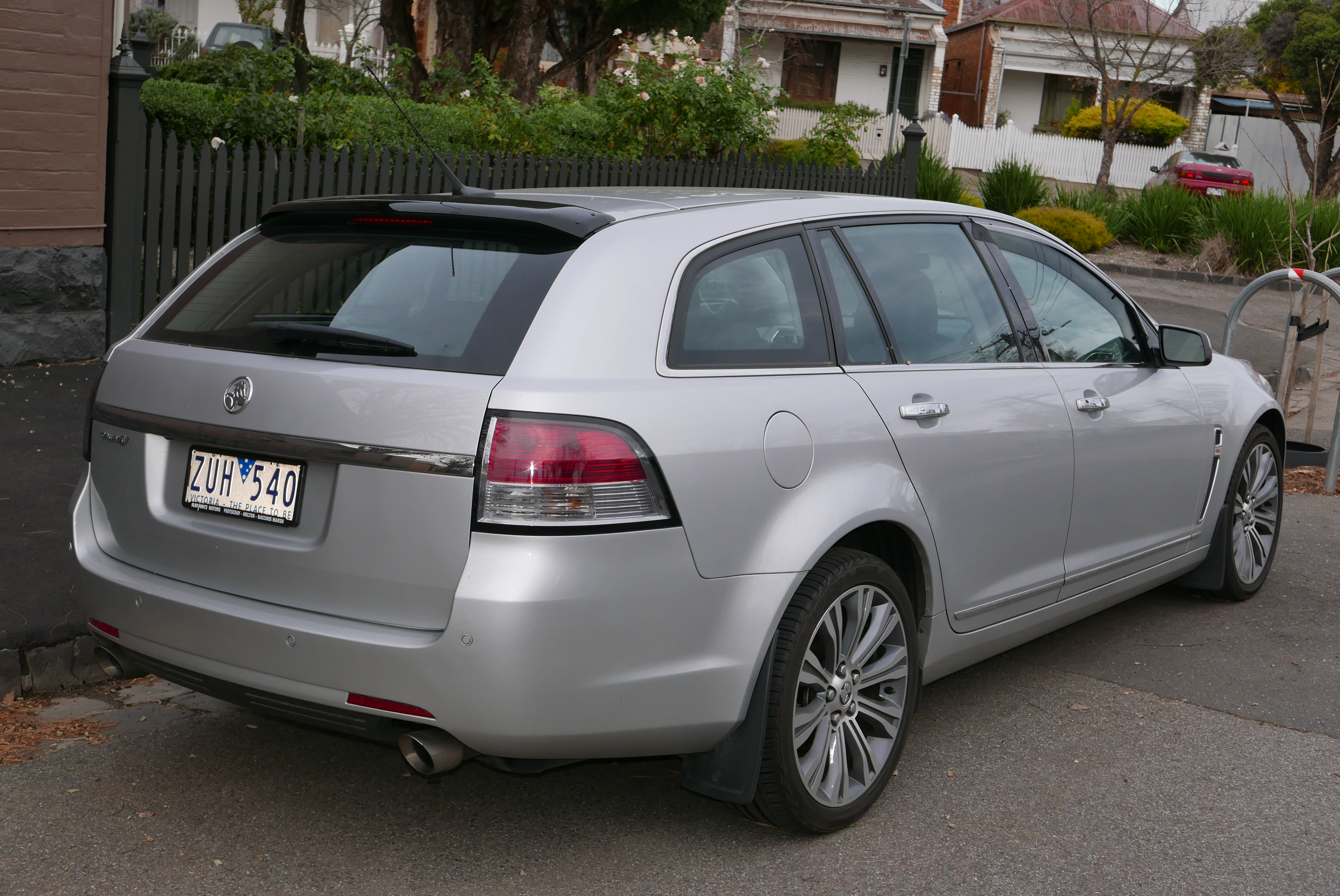
Calais V Sportwagon

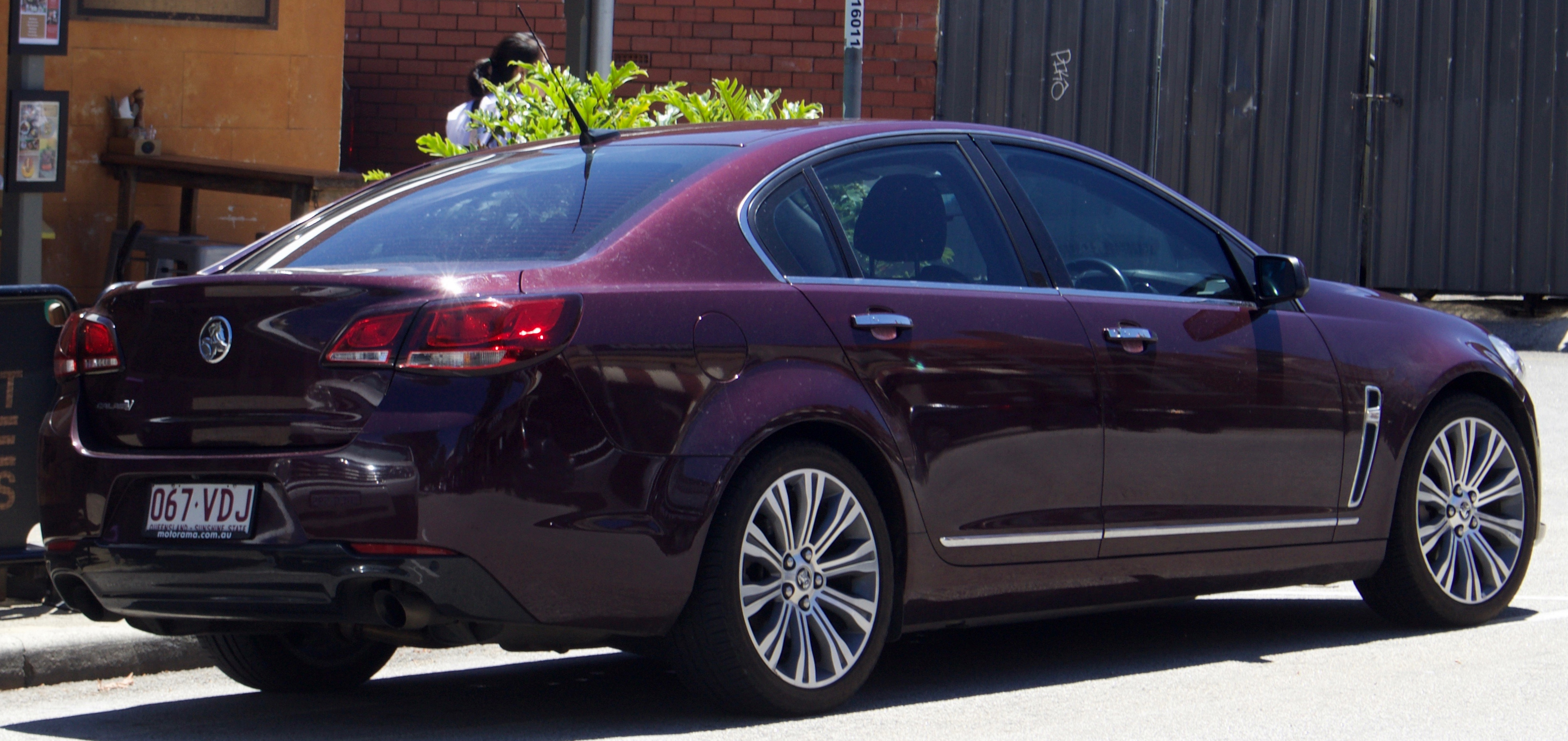
MY15 Calais V sedan

=== Limited editions ===
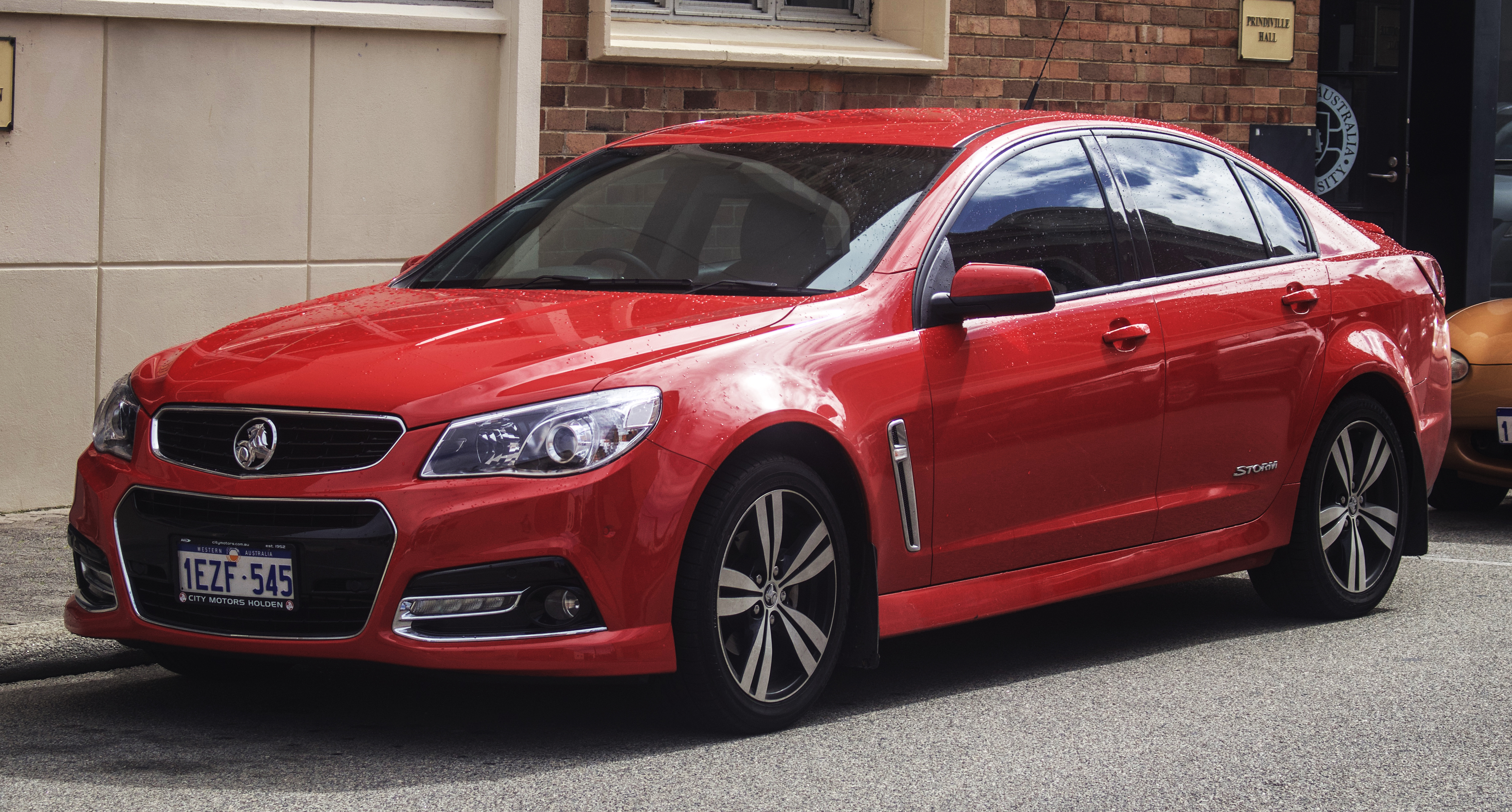
Commodore SV6 Storm

There have been several limited edition Commodore models produced, available on a range of specification levels:

- International: based on the Evoke, available on the sedan and Sportwagon specifications. It featured 18-inch wheels, minor alterations to the exterior and interior styling (LED running lights), blind spot alert, rear cross traffic alert, and leather seats. It was released to celebrate the 35th anniversary of the Commodore nameplate.

2014 Model Year

- Storm: available on the SV6 and SS sedan, Sportwagon, and Ute specifications. It featured "Storm" badging inside and out, satellite navigation and red stitching in the seats, front fog lights with chrome trim, and wheels unique to the model with black paint in-between spokes.
- Collingwood: available in SV6, SS or SS V sedan specification. It was produced in Heron White, and featured unique 20-inch wheels and decals celebrating the Collingwood Football Club: black-and-white stripes, floor mats embroidered with the team's logo, and a rear special edition badge.

2015 Model Year

- Craig Lowndes: available in SS V Redline specification. It was produced in Heron White or Red Hot, and featured upgraded Brembo front and rear brakes; 20-inch staggered wheels; black roof, spoiler, guard vents, bonnet and door stripes; red engine cover; and an embroidered "Craig Lowndes" signature on the dashboard. It was released to celebrate Craig Lowndes' 20th anniversary of first competing with Holden in local touring car racing.
- Sandman: Available in SV6 and SS-V Redline specifications. It was available as a Sportswagon and Ute. It featured "Sandman" decals, 20-inch wheels and optional orange sheep-skin seat covers. The name is a tribute to the Holden Sandman.
- Black Edition: available in the SV6 and SS specifications. It featured exterior chroming blacked out, black mirror covers, darker 18-inch alloy rims, red leather stitching to the interior, heads up display, navigation and special floor mats.

2016 and 2017 Model Years.

- Reserve Edition: Available in SV6 and SS-V Redline specifications. It was only sold to Holden employees. It featured 19-inch forged alloy wheels and "Reserve" badging and the buyer's employee number on the build plate.

2017 Model Year

- Director: based on the Calais V sedan. It featured a 6.2-litre LS3 V8 producing 304 kW (408 hp) and a six-speed automatic gearbox, Brembo brakes, paddle shifters, and Magnetic Ride Control (MRC). The name was chosen to pay homage to Peter Brock's HDT Director.
- Motorsport: based on the SS-V Redline sedan. It featured MRC, 20-inch wheels, and front and rear cross-drilled Brembo brake rotors.
- Magnum: Based on SS-V Redline Ute. It features the suspension from the SS-V Redline sedan. The name is a tribute to the HDT Magnum.

== Series II update ==
In September 2015, Holden introduced the MY16, Series II (VF II) upgrade to the Commodore. The biggest change is the addition of the larger, more powerful 6.2-litre 304 kW (408 hp) and 570 N⋅m (420 lb⋅ft), LS3 V8 engine across all current V8 models of the Commodore, Calais, Caprice and Ute. A Bimodal exhaust was fitted standard to the SS, SS V and Redline models and was optional on Calais V when the LS3 V8 was fitted. All wagon models got new LED taillights. As well as this, the front bumper and running lights were restyled, the gear ratios on the SS V Redline were altered, and the Redline's suspension tune was adjusted. For 2017 the SSV pack and Calais wagon were dropped from the range. SV6 models got HUD/GPS plus wheels previously used on "Black Edition". SS gained HUD/GPS and 19-inch wheels. Redline and Calais V models gained chrome V Series door sill plates. Calais V also gained auto tinting rear view mirror and Calais lettering on the flanks of the car. The VF II Ute was unveiled in October at the Deniliquin Ute Muster.

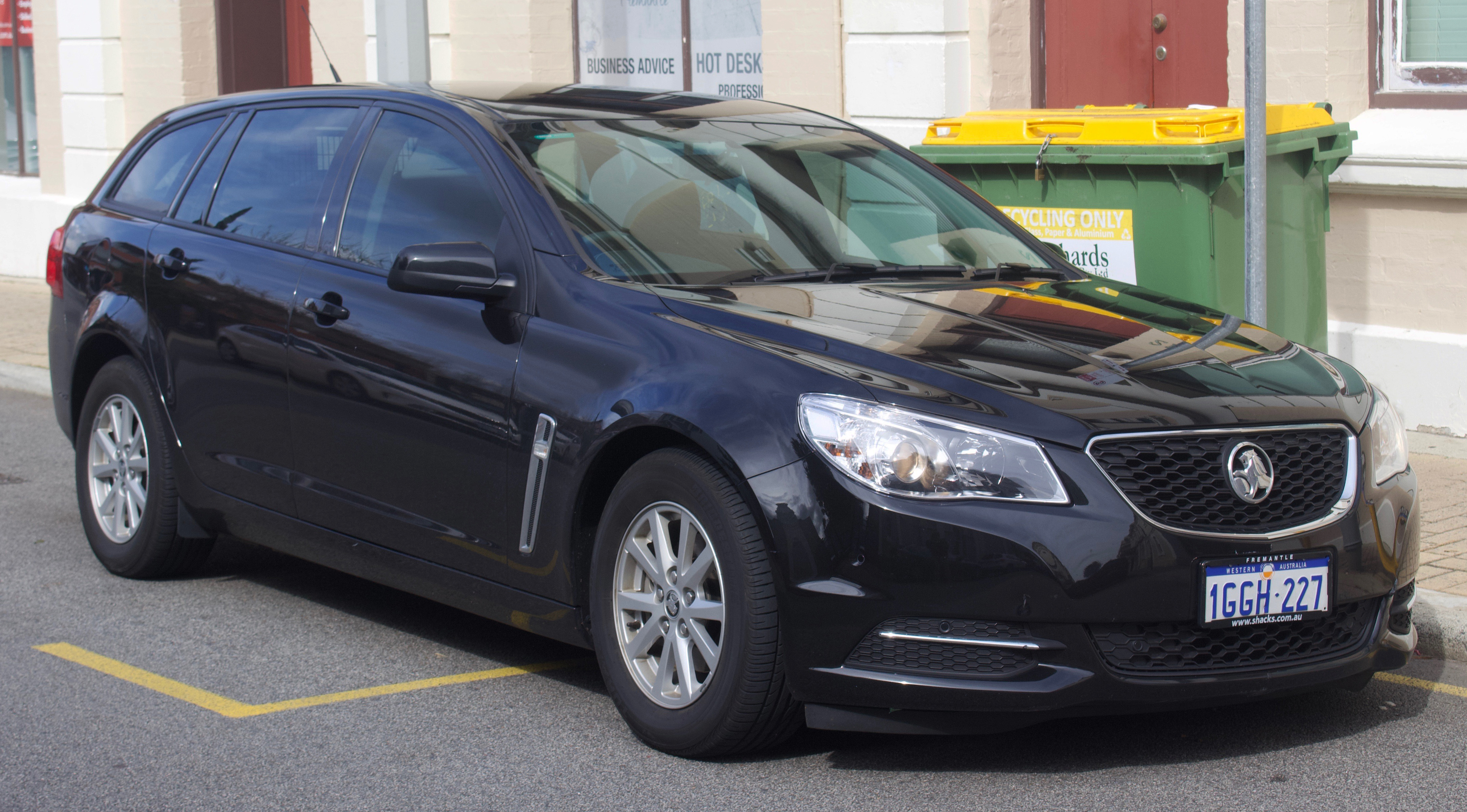
MY17 Commodore Evoke (Series II)

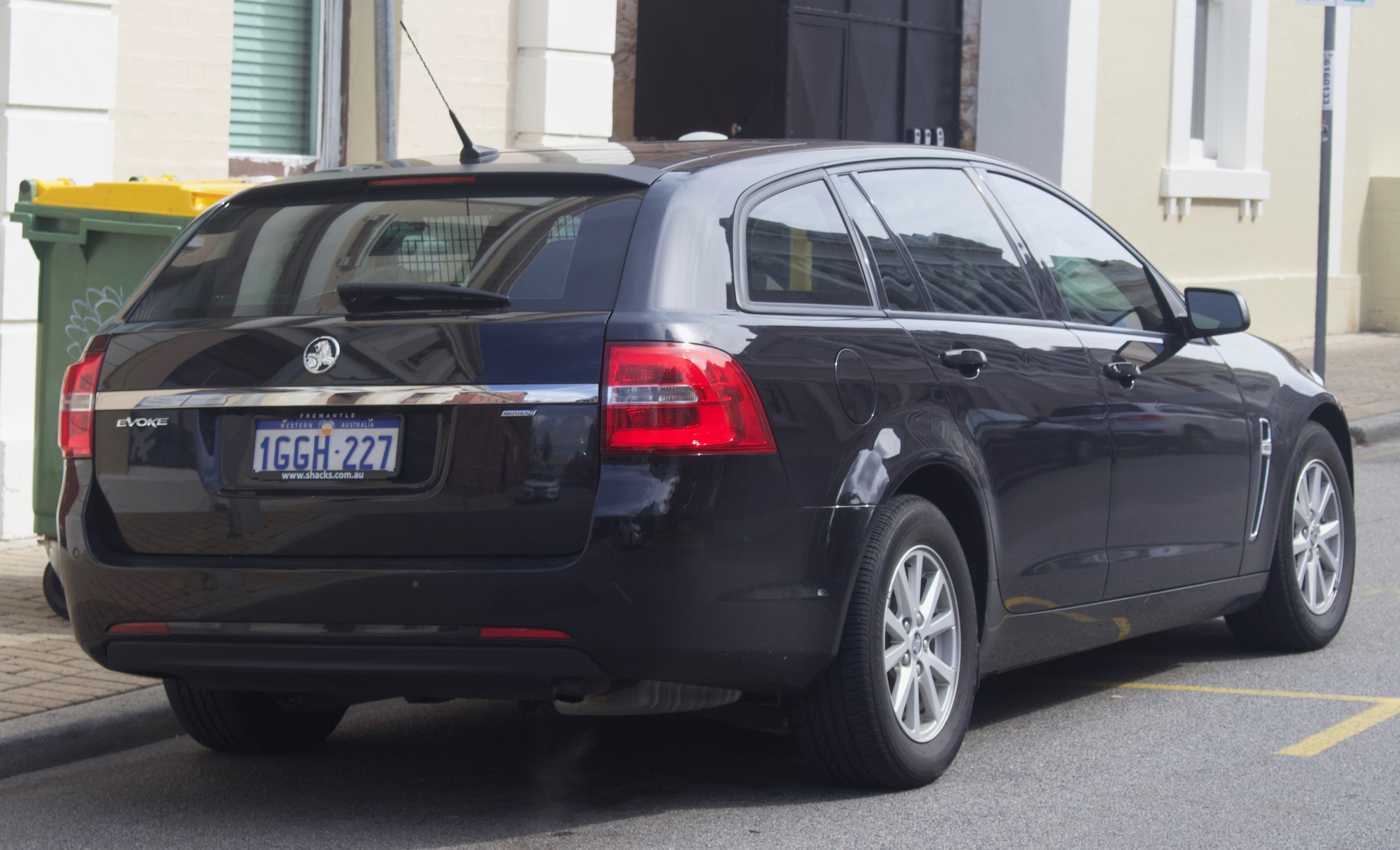
MY17 Commodore Evoke (Series II)

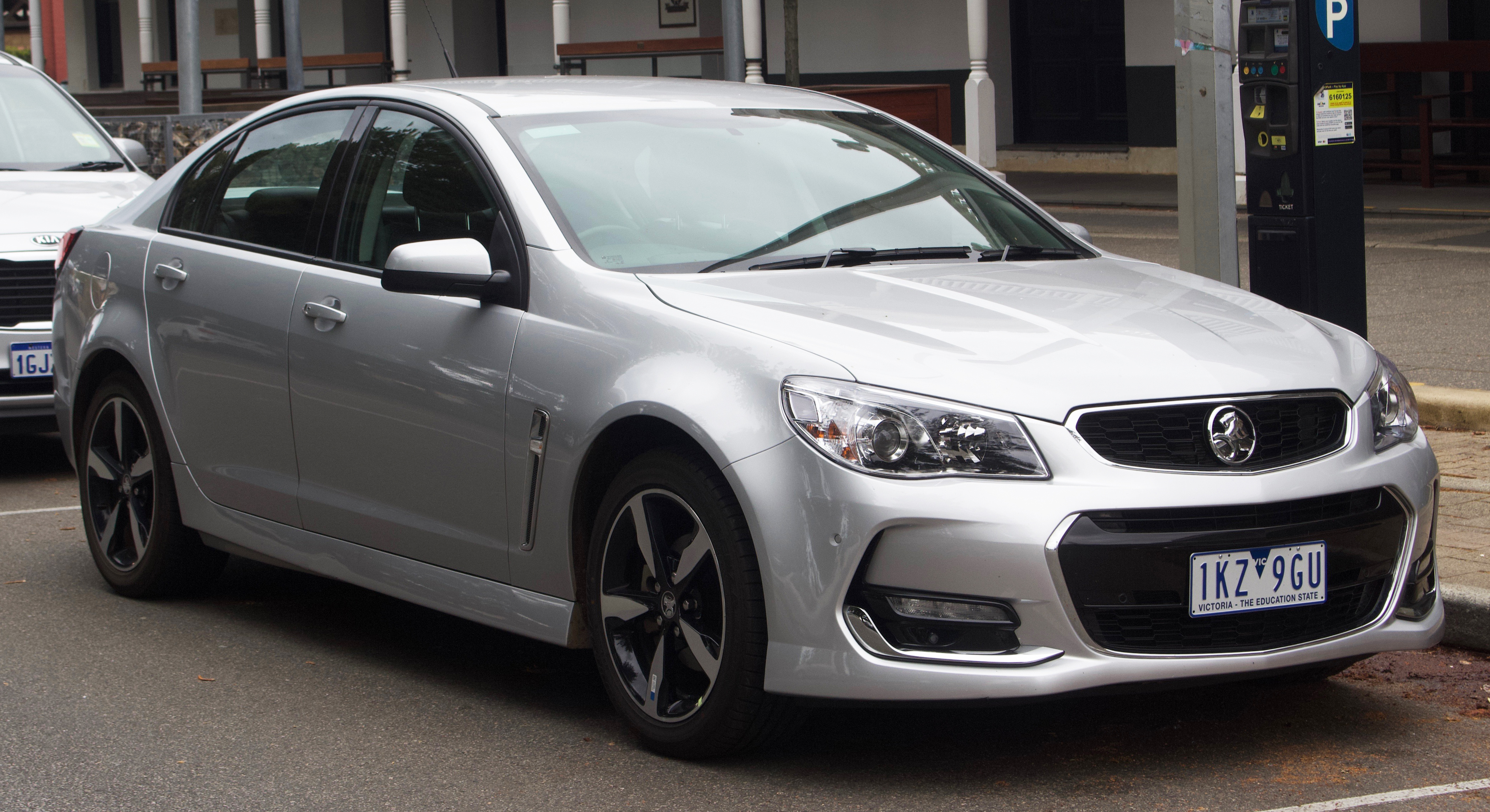
MY17 Commodore SV6 (Series II)

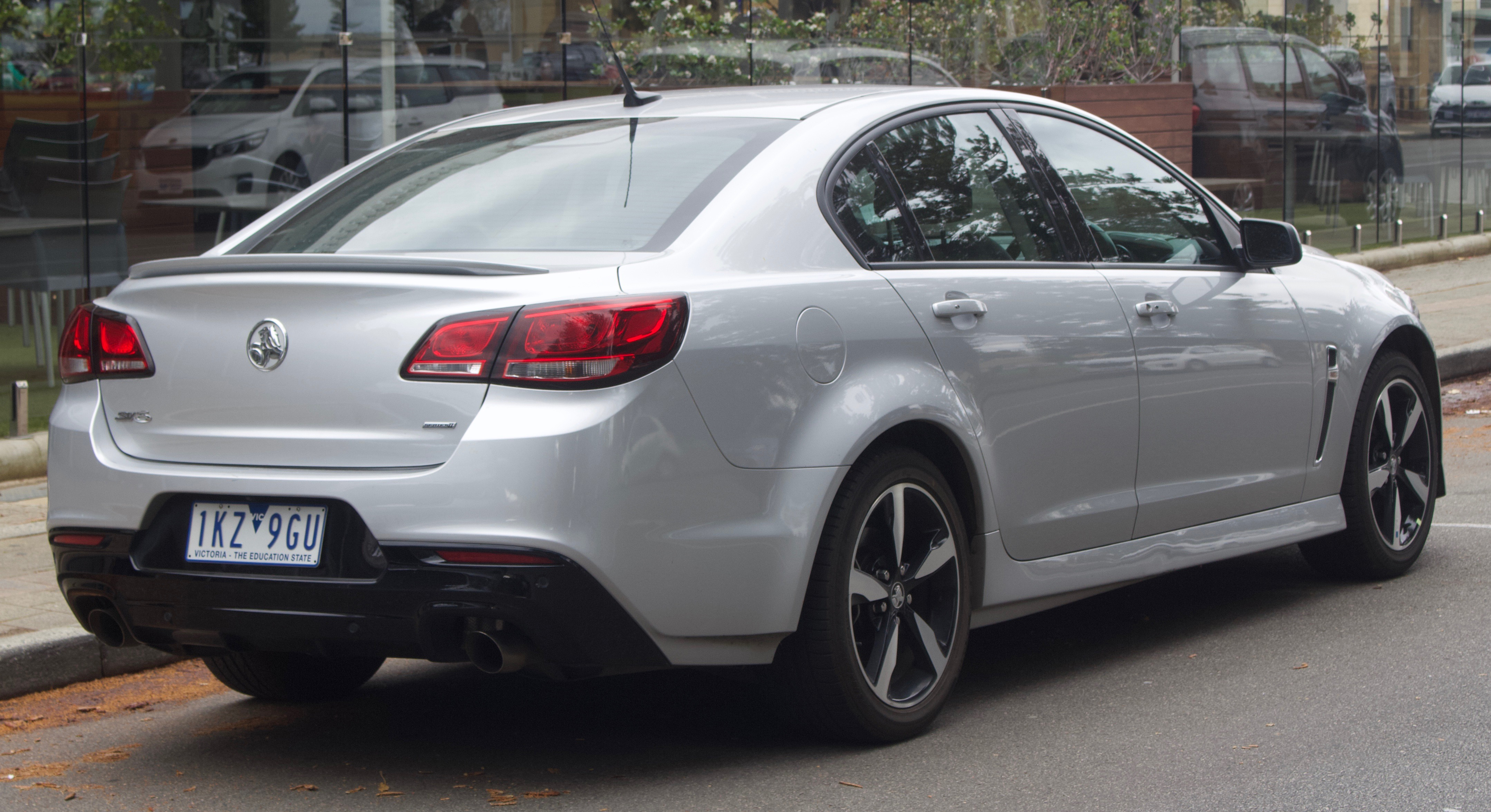
MY17 Commodore SV6 (Series II)

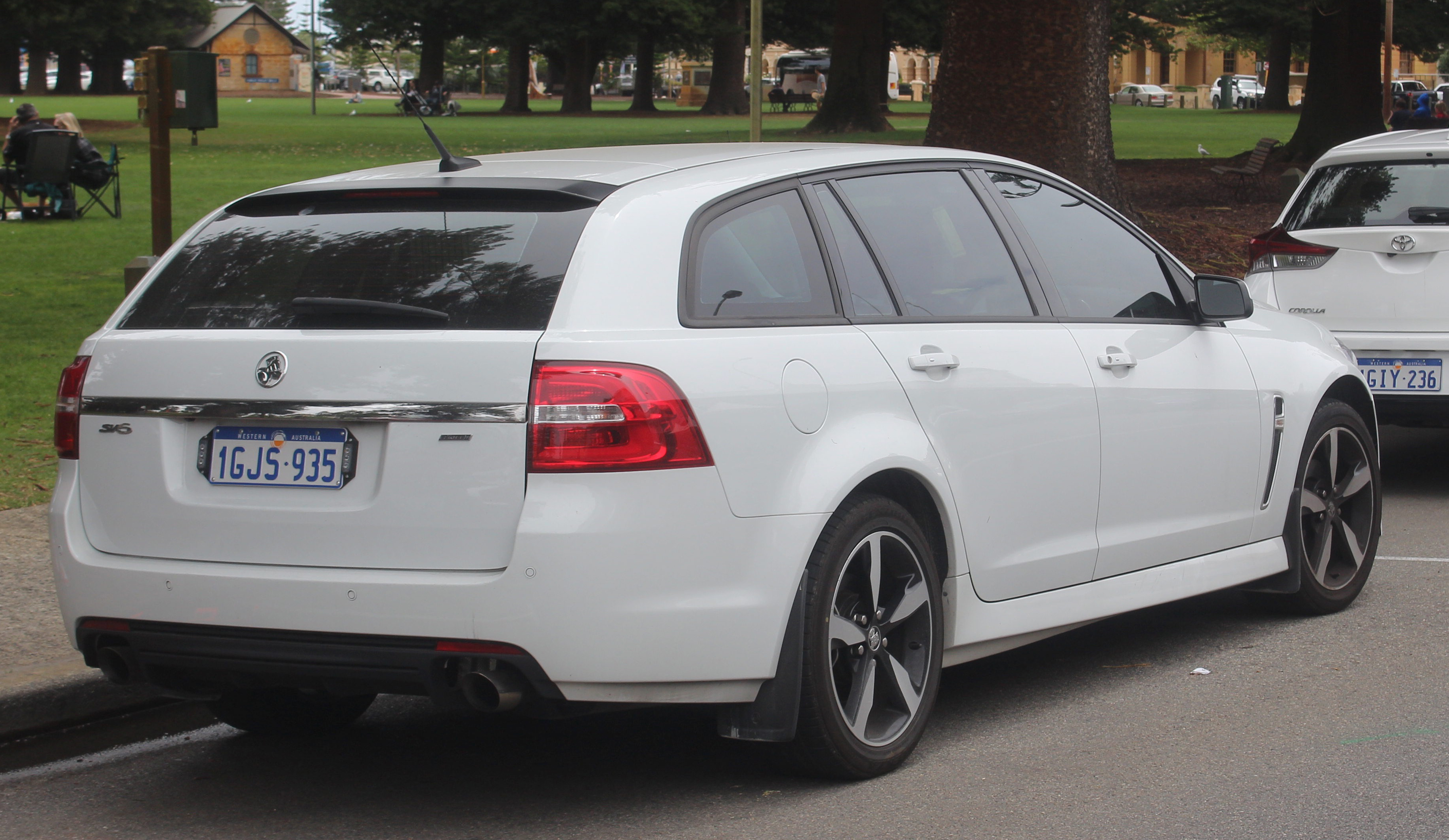
MY17 Commodore SV6 Sportwagon (Series II)

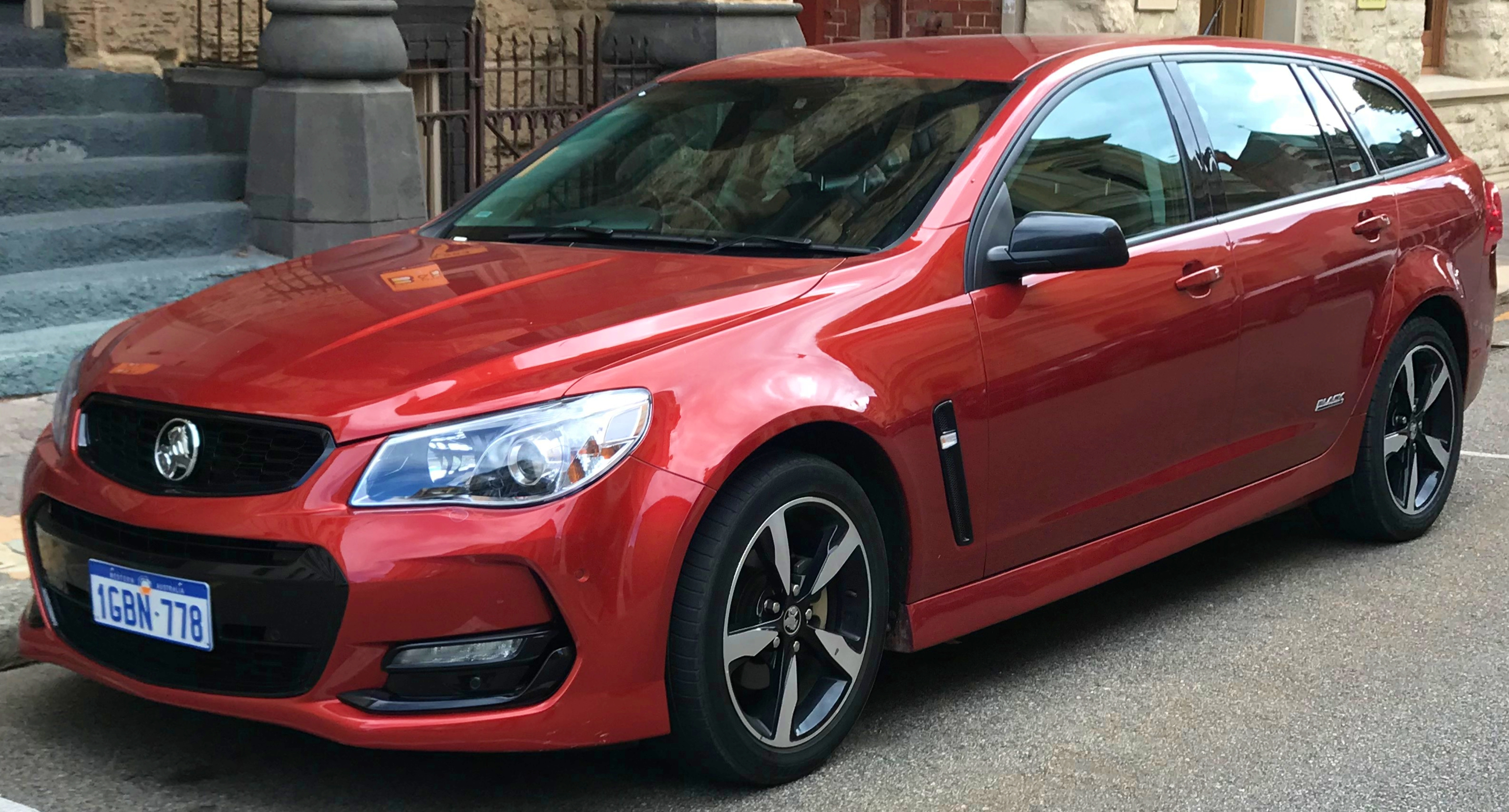
MY16 Commodore SV6 Black Edition (Series II)

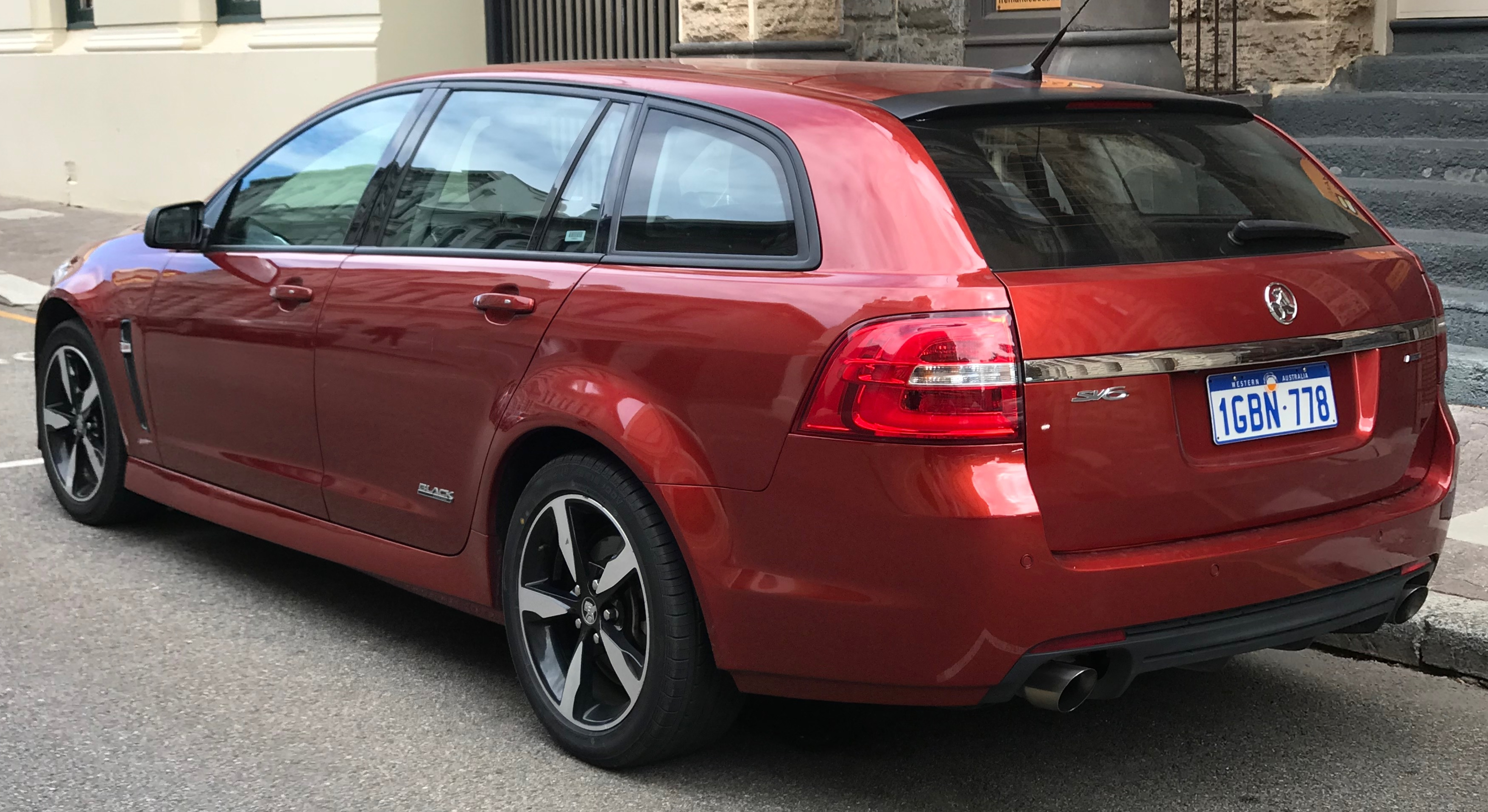
MY16 Commodore SV6 Black Edition (Series II)

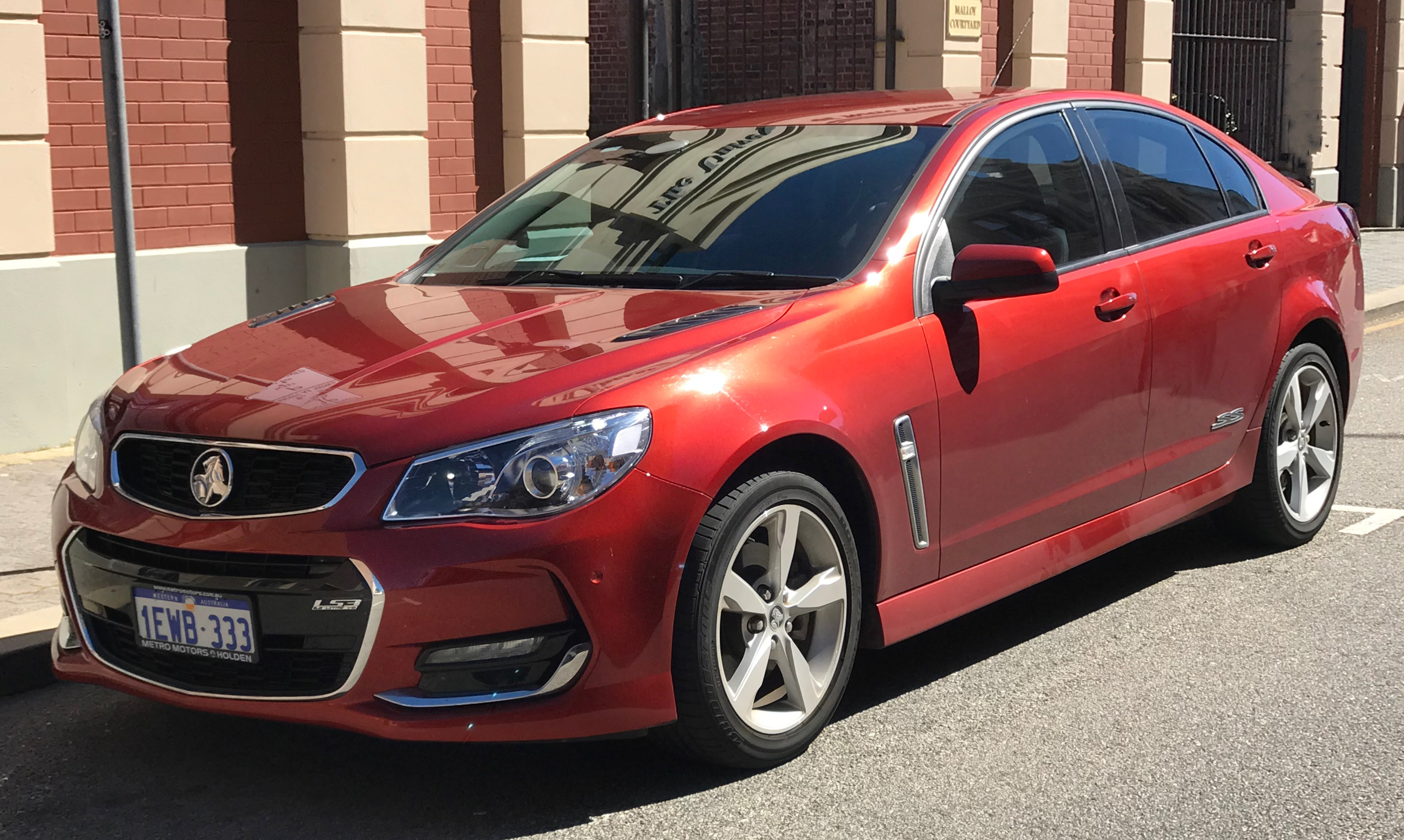
MY16 Commodore SS (Series II)

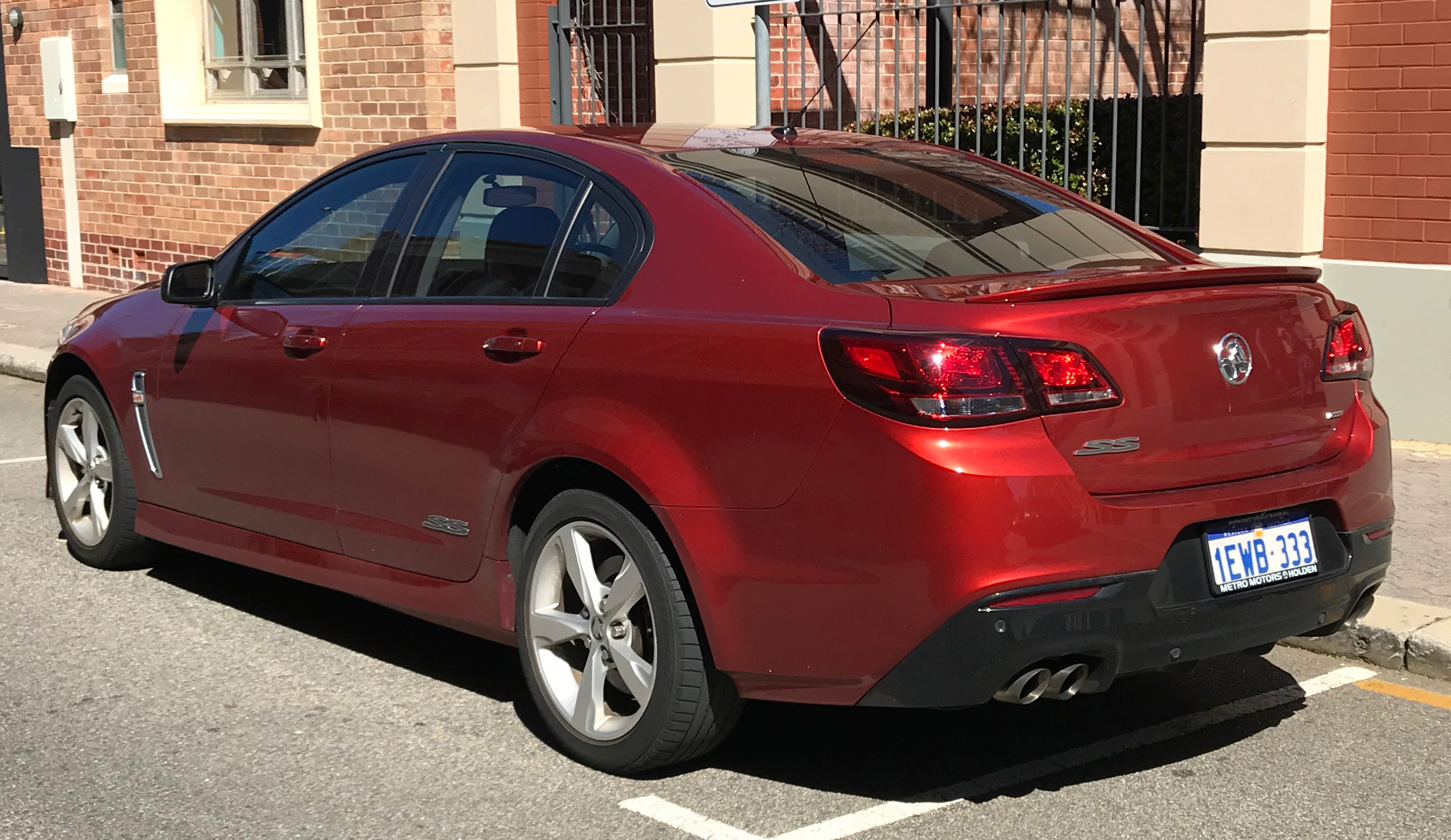
MY16 Commodore SS (Series II)

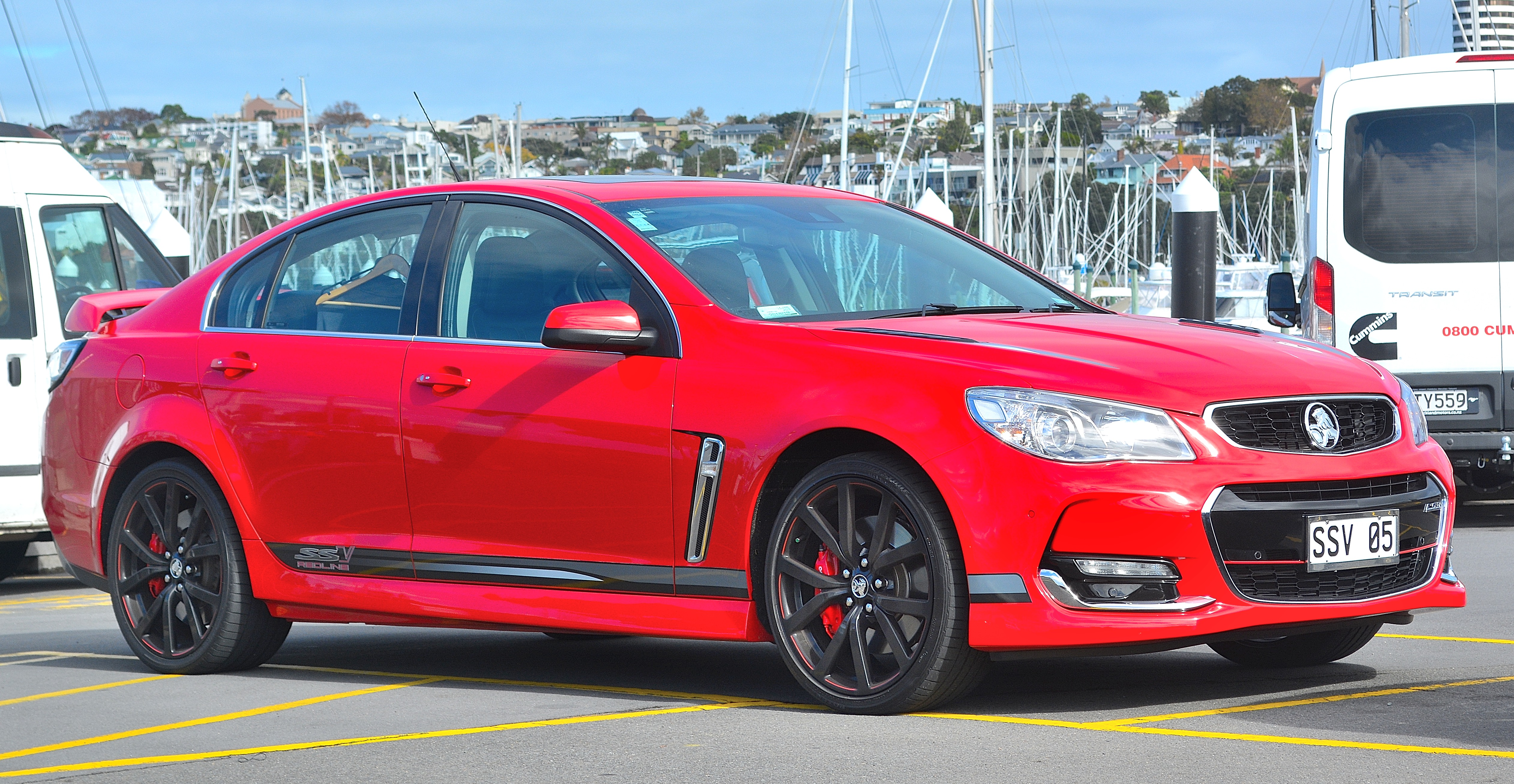
MY17 SS V Redline (Series II)

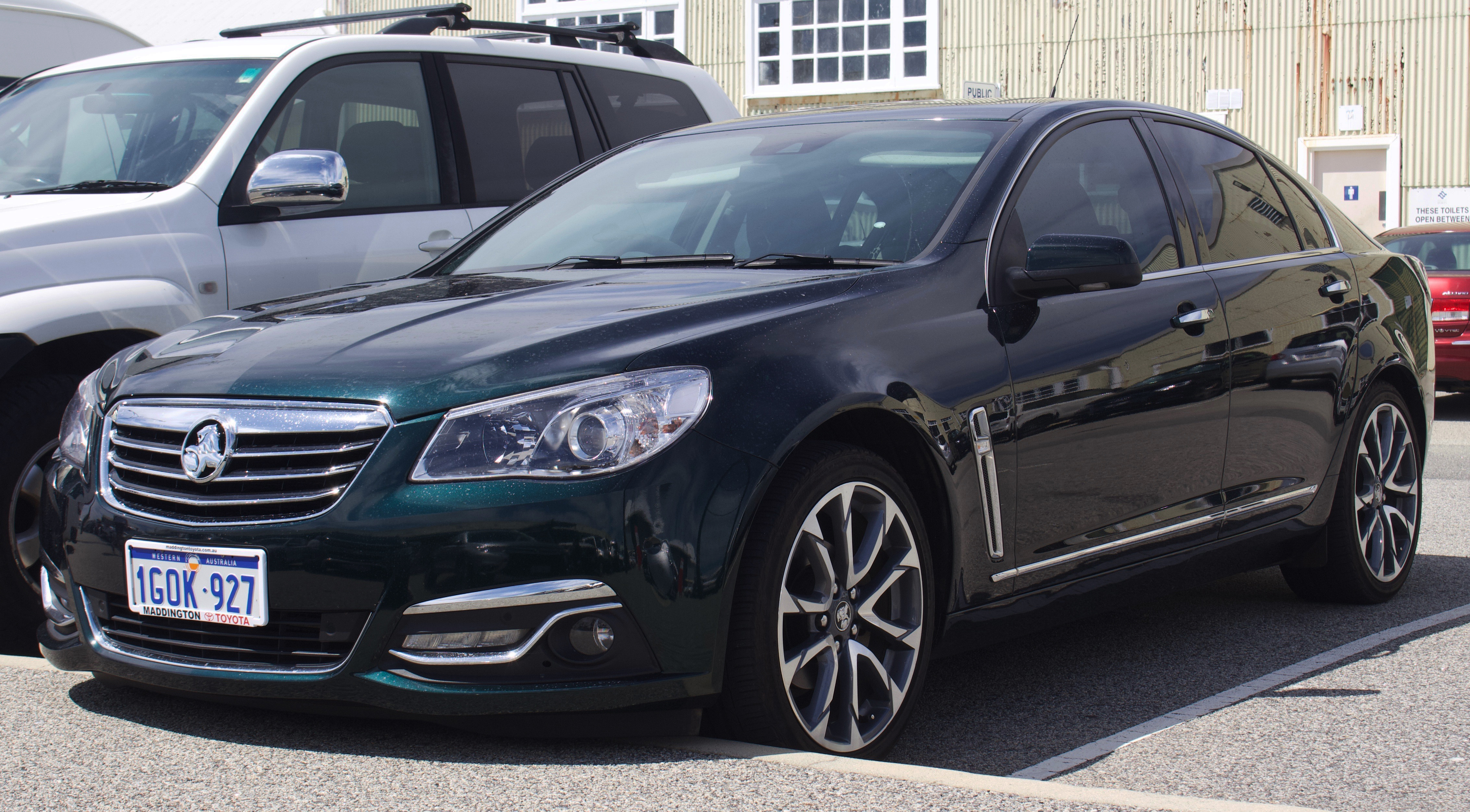
MY16 Calais V (Series II)

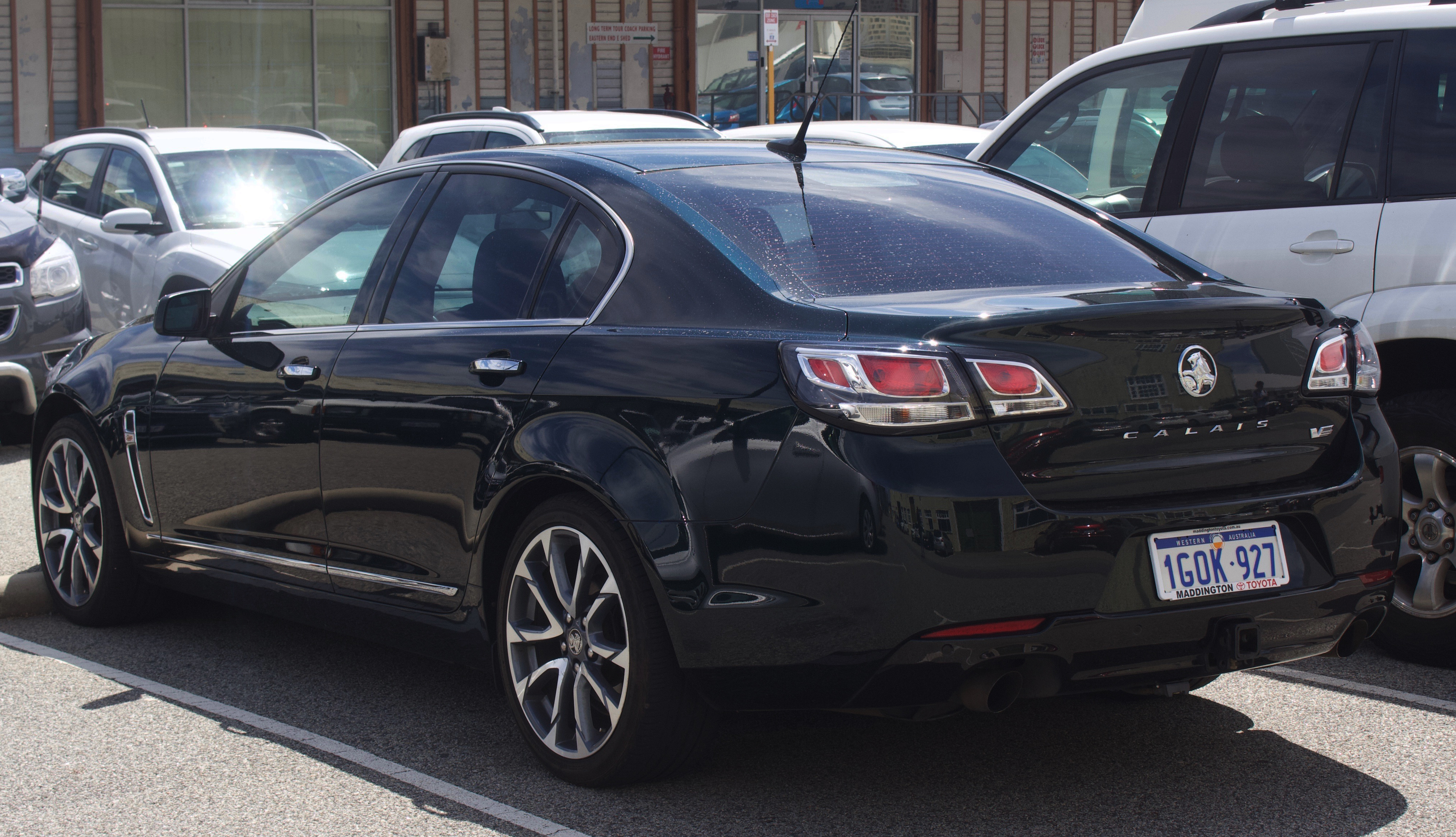
MY16 Calais V (Series II)

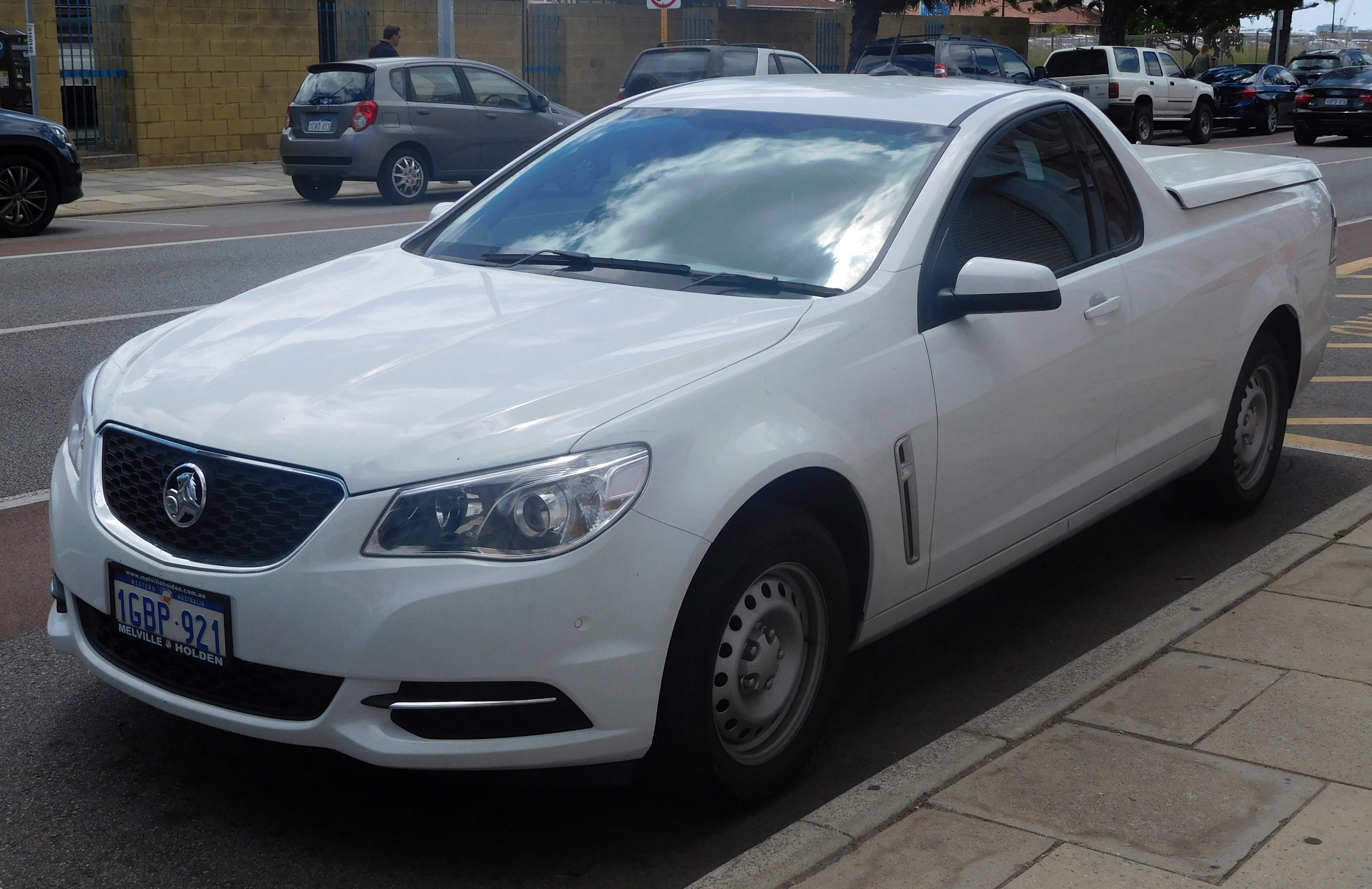
MY16 Ute (Series II)

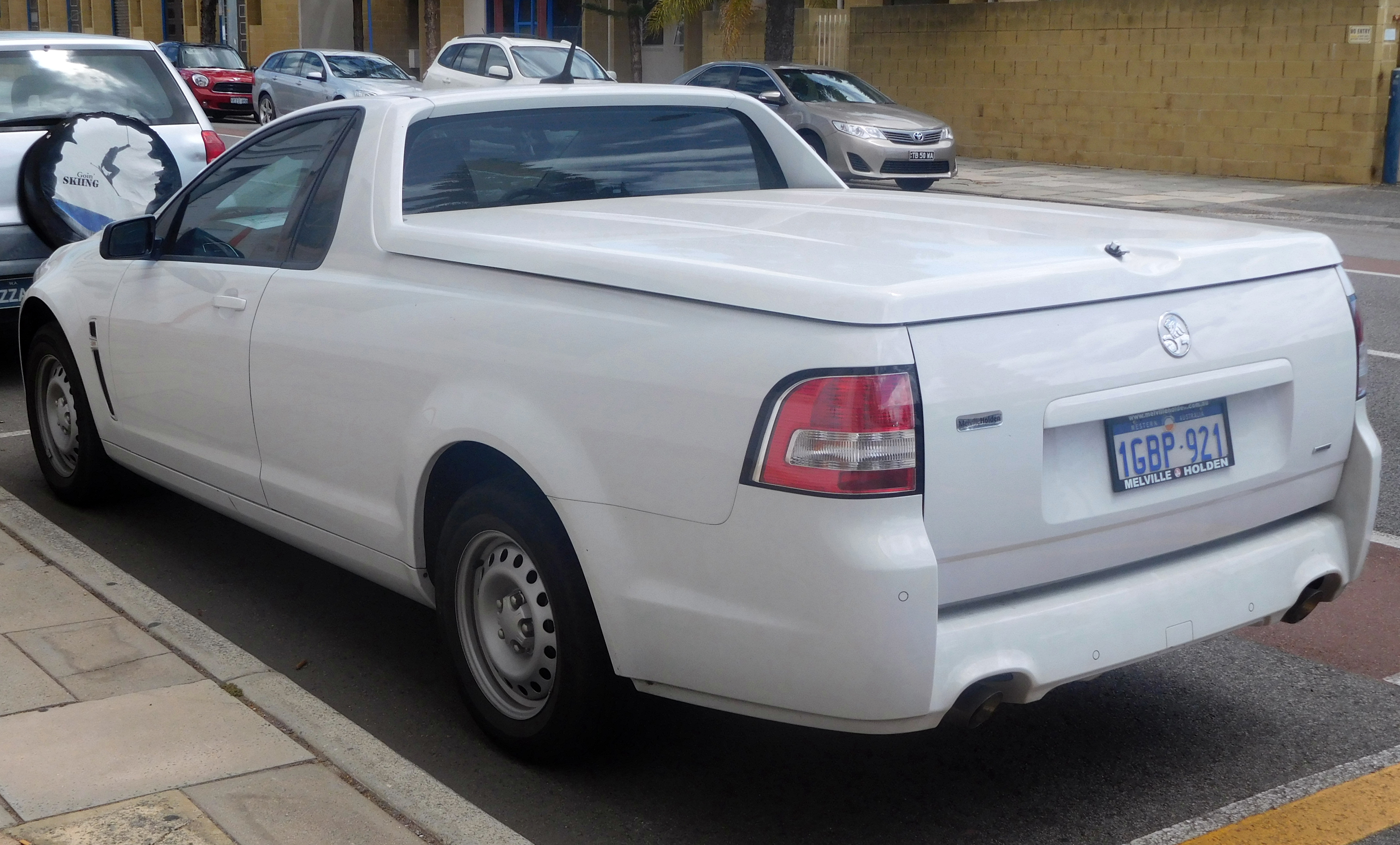
MY16 Ute (Series II)

== HSV range (Gen-F) ==
Holden Special Vehicles versions of the VF went on sale in August 2013 as the Gen-F series. The Gen-F range included: the ClubSport, Grange, GTS, Maloo, and Senator Signature. The Caprice-based Grange ended production in 2016. The rest of the Commodore-based range ending production in 2017. The HSV GTS and Maloo were sold in the United Kingdom in the Vauxhall VXR8 range, which was discontinued in 2017.

2017 Vauxhall VXR8 GTSR

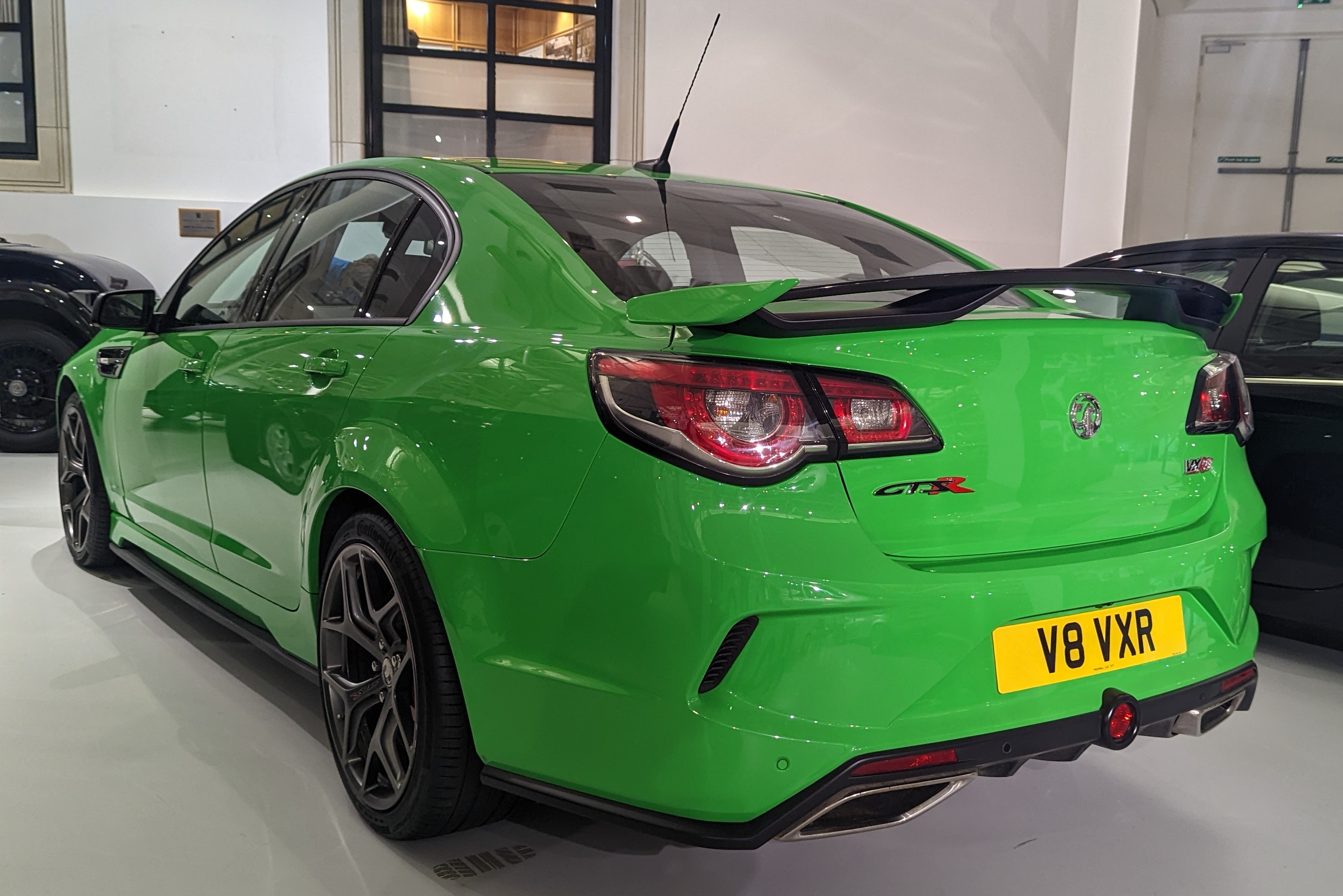
Rear view

=== ClubSport ===
The HSV ClubSport was the entry-level model. It was powered by a 6.2-litre LS3 V8 engine, producing 317 kW (425 hp) and 550 N⋅m (406 lb⋅ft). the ClubSport R8 variant increased the power to 325 kW (436 hp), the ClubSport R8 SV enhnaced option increased the power to 340 kW (456 hp) and 570 N⋅m (420 lb⋅ft). The ClubSport R8 Tourer was the only wagon in the Gen-F range.

In November 2014, as part of the MY15 update, the power was increased to 325 kW (436 hp) for the base ClubSport and 340 kW (456 hp) for the R8. In 2015 the ClubSport R8 LSA was released, powered by a 6.2-litre supercharged LSA producing 400 kW (536 hp).

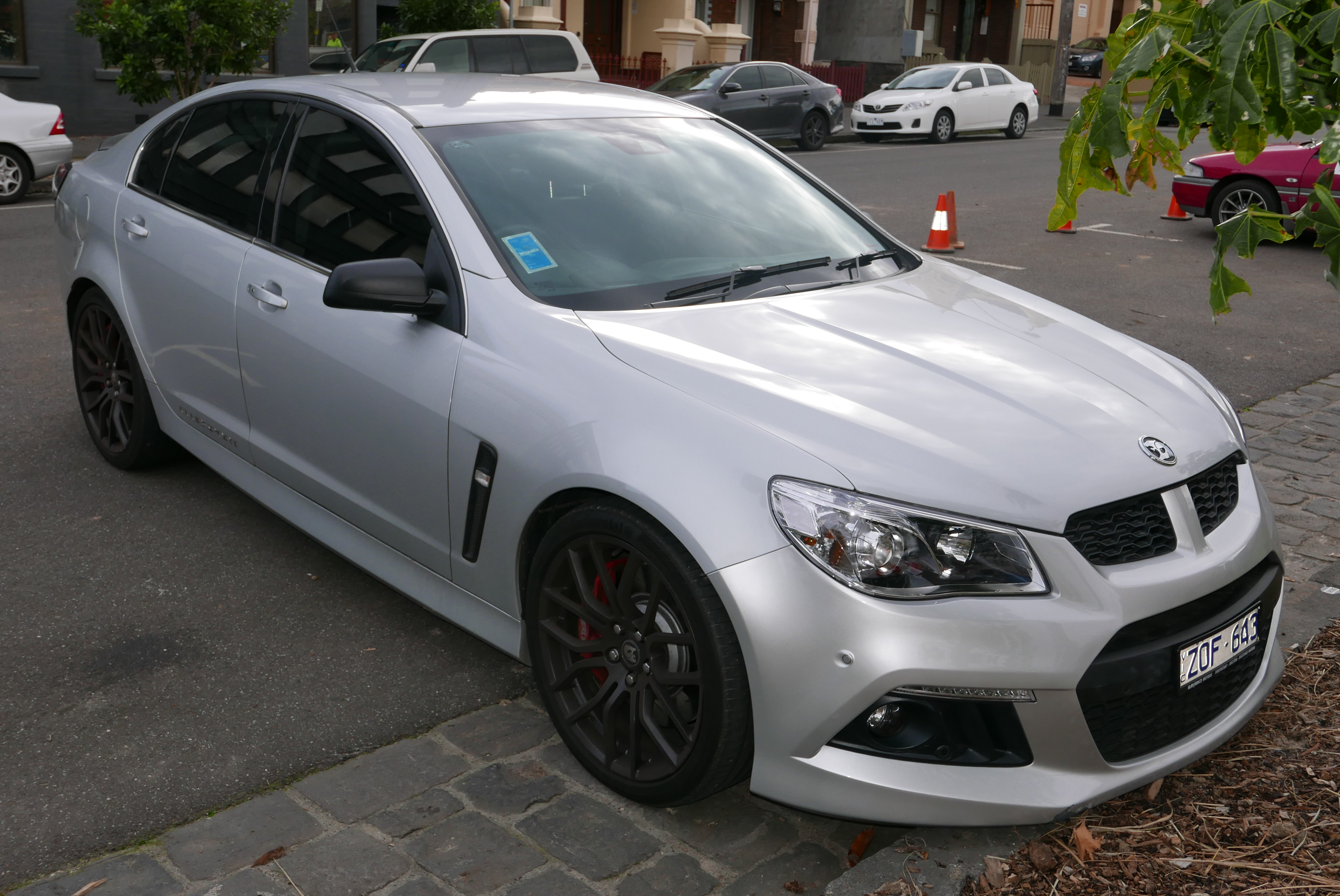
Clubsport R8

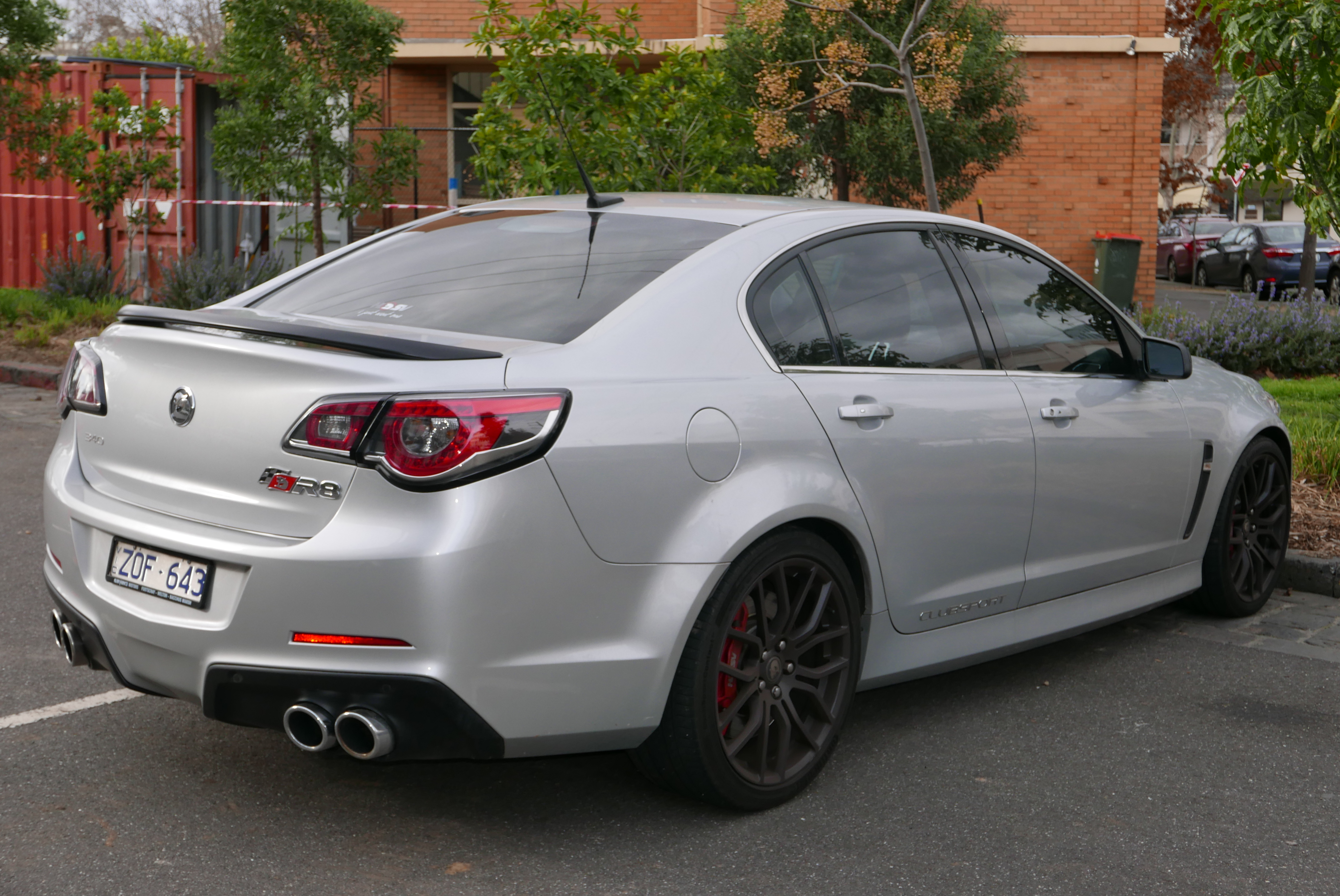
Rear view

=== GTS ===
The GTS was the flagship model. It was powered by a 6.2-litre supercharged LSA engine, producing 430 kW (577 bhp) and 740 N⋅m (546 lb⋅ft) of torque, and featured Magnetic Ride Control (MRC) suspension.

The GTSR was introduced in 2015. It was powered by a 6.2-litre supercharged LSA engine, producing 435 kW (583 hp) and 740 N⋅m (546 lb⋅ft) of torque, equipped with a Tremec TR-6060 6-speed manual transmission or optional 6-speed automatic transmission with Active Select and paddle shifters.

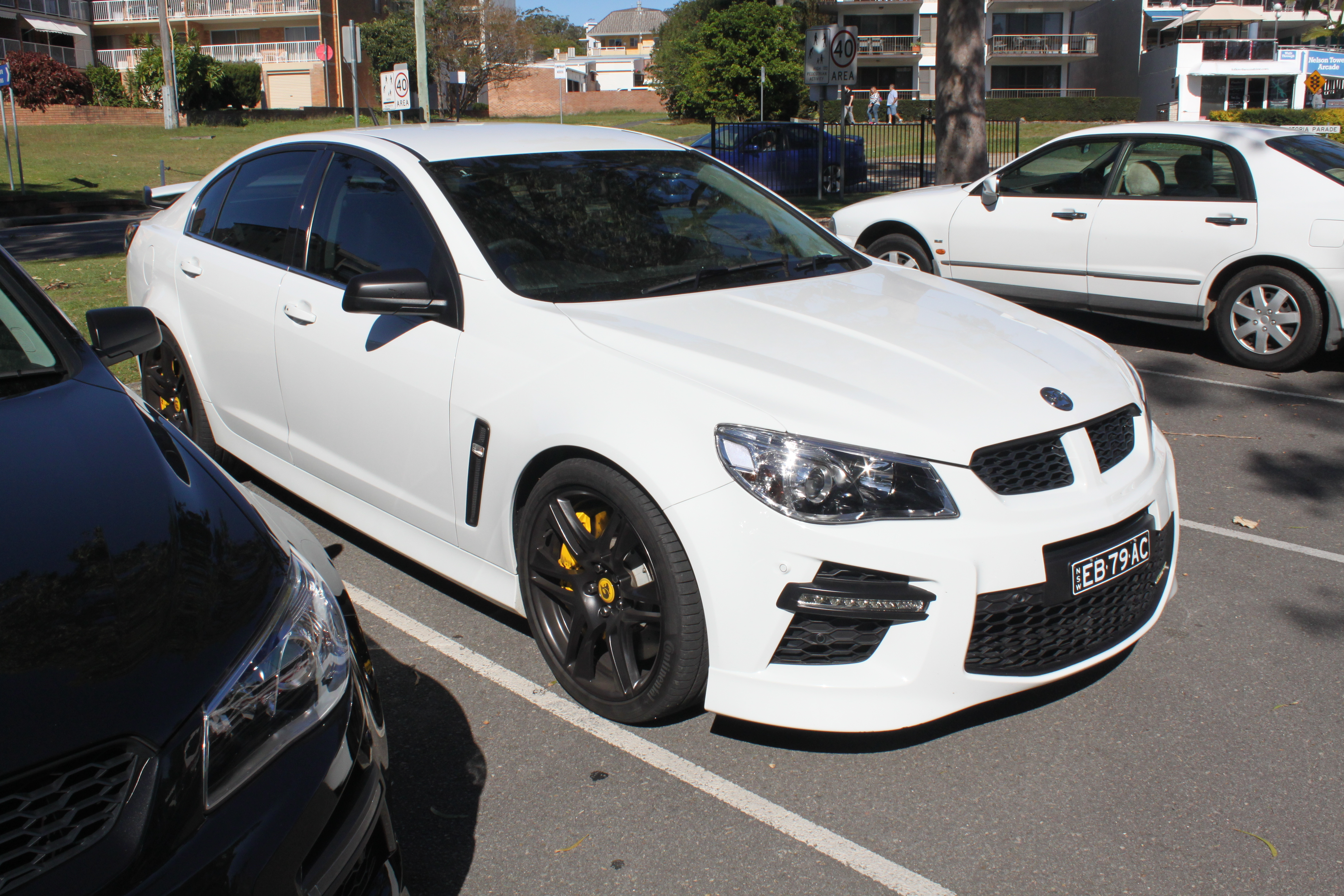
GTS

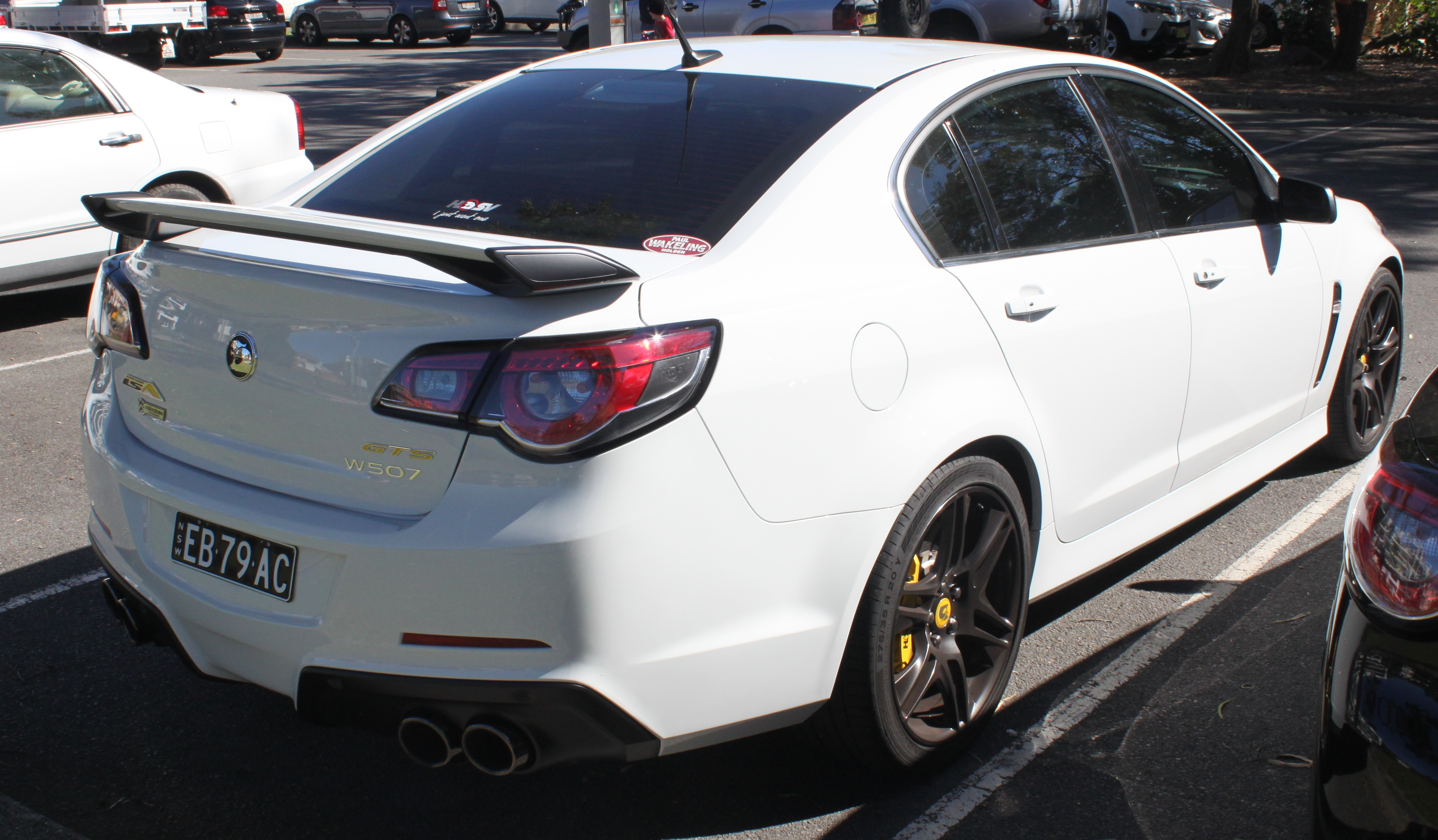
Rear view

=== Maloo ===
The Maloo was the utility model, based on the Holden Ute. The Maloo is powered by a 6.2-litre LS3 producing 317 kW (425 hp), the Maloo R8 increasing the power to 325 kW (436 hp), and the Maloo R8 SV Enhanced increasing the power farther to 340 kW (456 hp).

In November 2014, as part of the MY15 update the power of the base Maloo was increased to 325 kW (436 hp), and the Maloo R8 to 340 kW (456 hp). The Maloo R8 LSA was released in 2016. It was powered by a 6.2-litre supercharged LSA engine, producing 400 kW (536 hp).

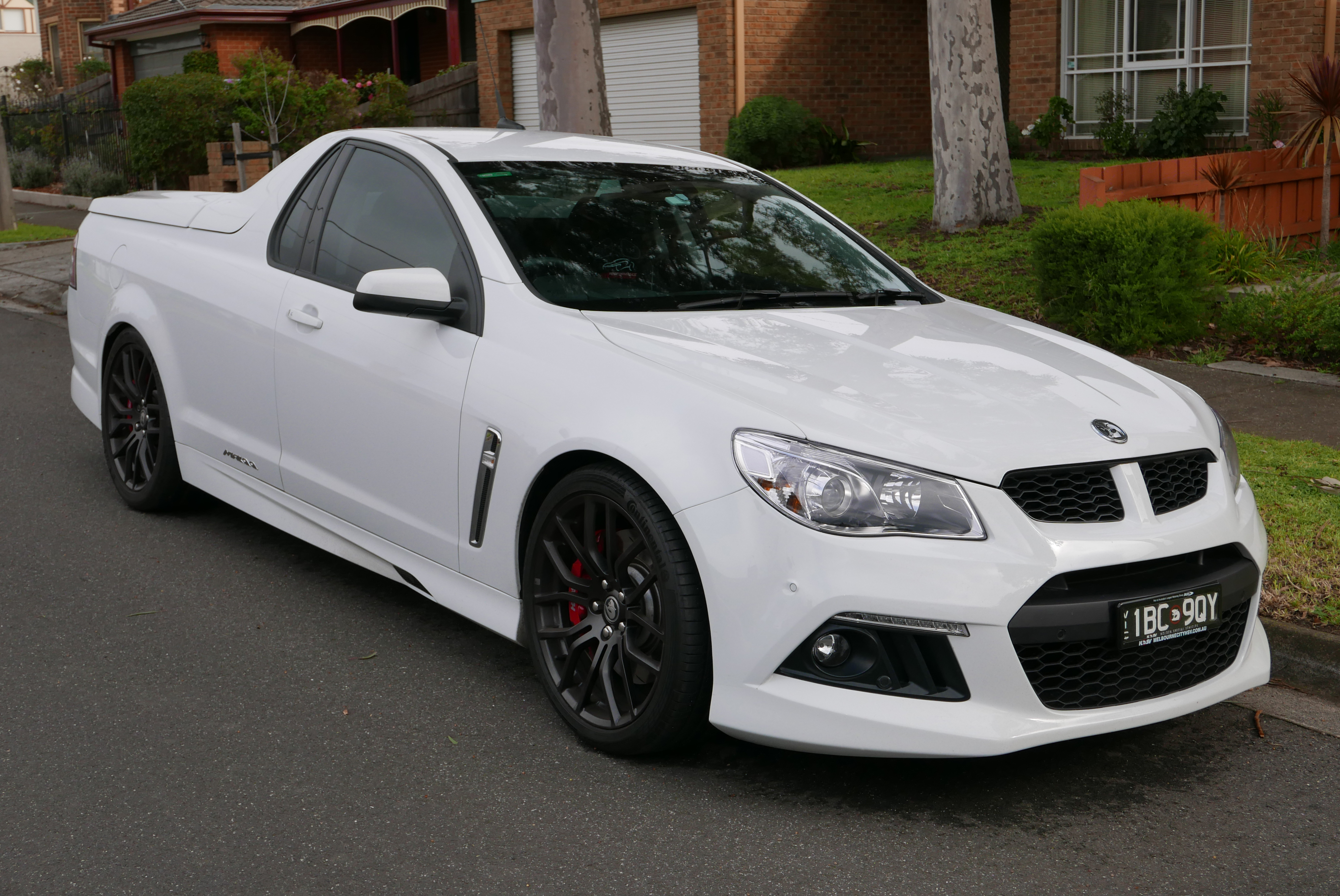
Maloo

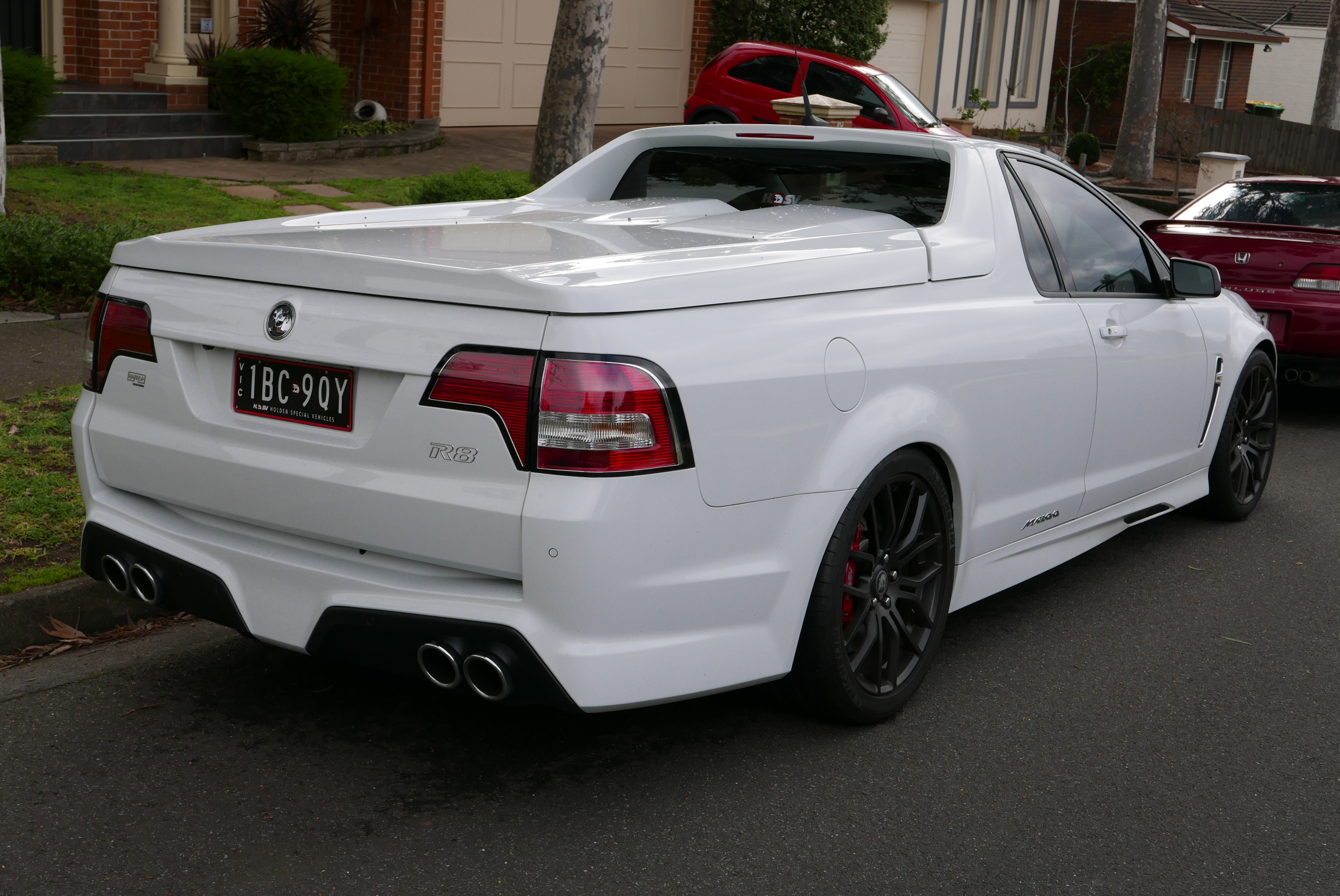
Rear view

=== Senator Signature ===
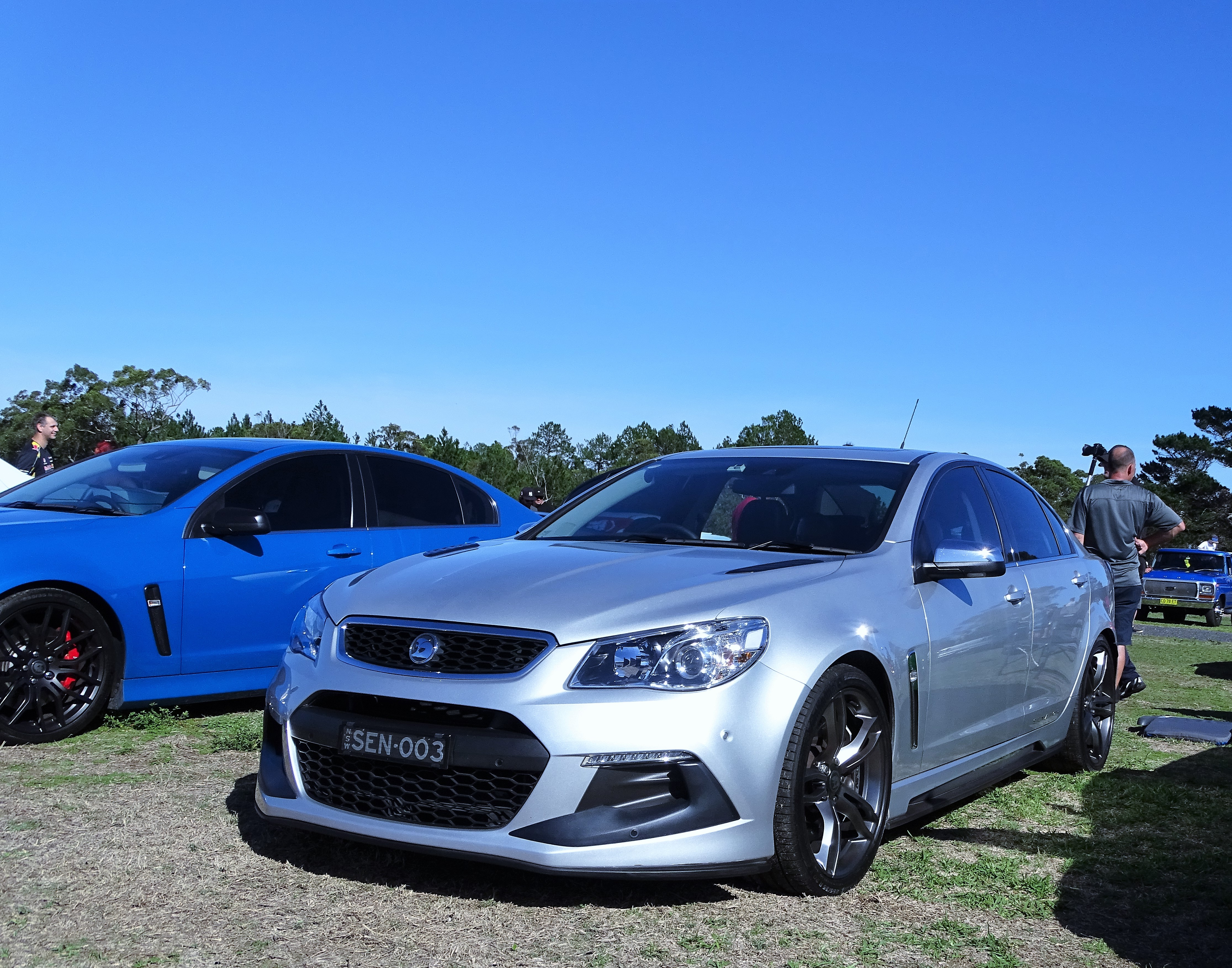
Senator Signature

The Senator Signature was the luxury model. It was powered by a 6.2-litre LS3 engine, producing 340 kW (456 hp), and featured MRC suspension, with two, "Touring" and "Sport" options.

== Production ==
In 2013 the sales of large cars dropped by 14.7 per cent, with the Commodore, Ford Falcon, and Toyota Aurion dropping in sales. The Ford Falcon (FG) was the direct competitor to the VF Commodore. Between 2013 and 2017 the VF Commodore re-branded in the United States as the Chevrolet SS.

The final VF Commodore was produced on 20 October 2017. It was the final Holden-branded vehicle manufactured in Australia.

== Chevrolet SS ==
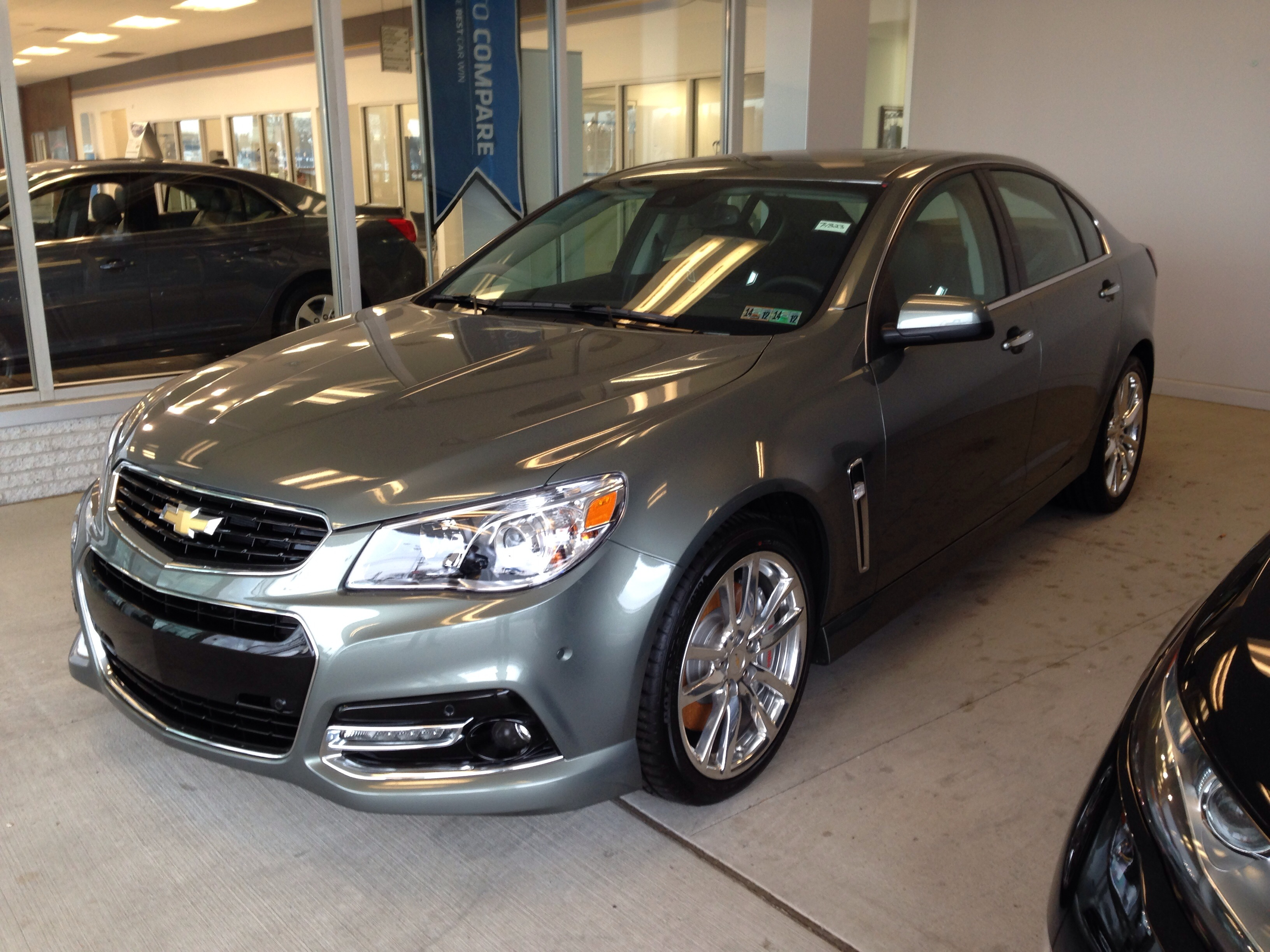
Chevrolet SS

The Chevrolet SS is a full-size sedan sold under the Chevrolet marque in United States, produced from 2013 to 2017. It was manufactured by Holden, based on the Holden VF Commodore. It is considered a successor to the Pontiac G8, a rebadged VE Commodore sold under the Pontiac marque.

It was powered by the 6.2-litre LS3 V8 at 309 kW (415 hp) and 563 N⋅m (415 lb⋅ft).

== V8 Supercars ==
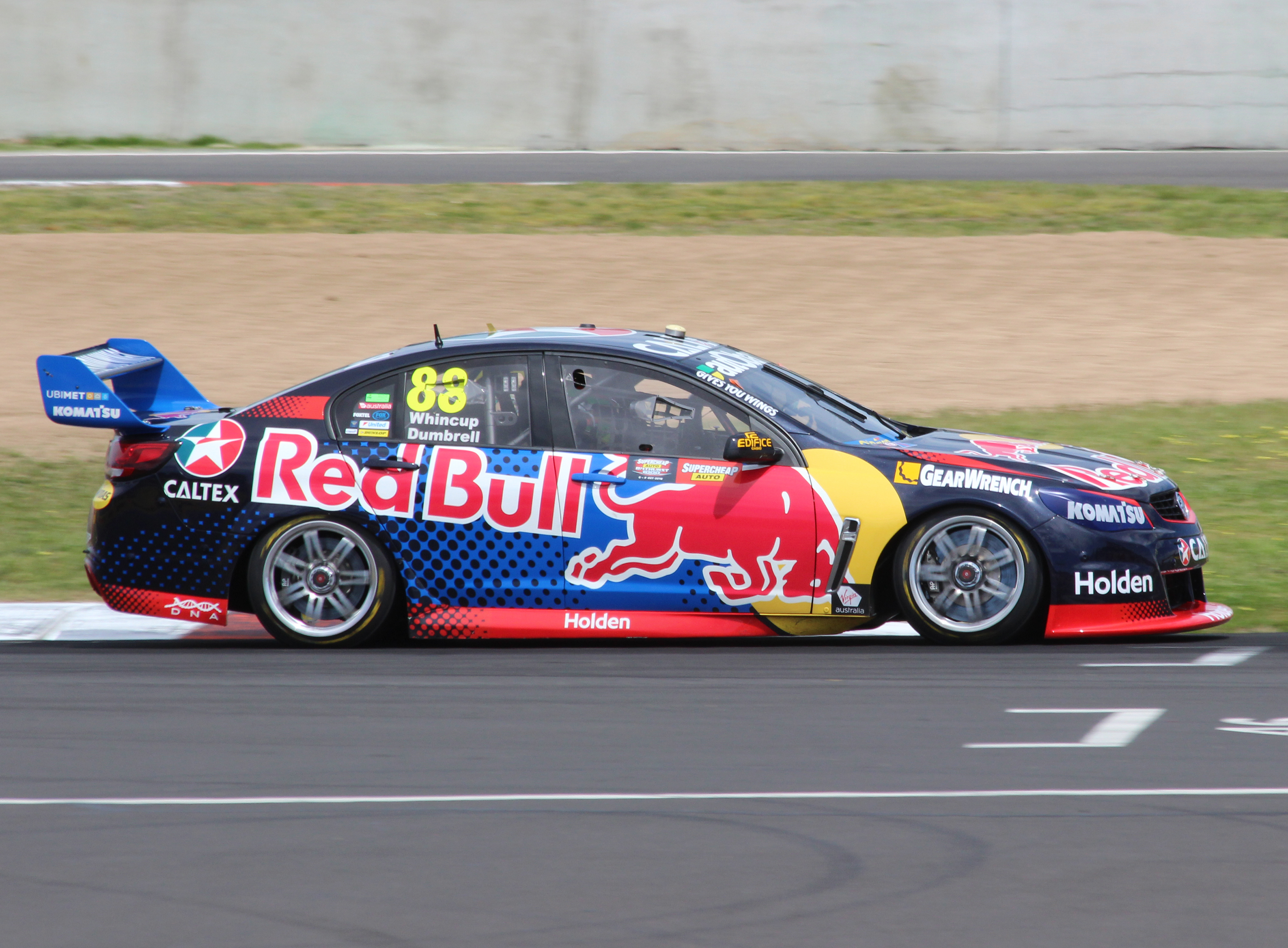
VF Commodore V8 Supercar, driven by Jamie Whincup during the 2016 Supercheap Auto Bathurst 1000

The program for the V8 Supercar version of the VF was headed up by Holden Motorsport technical manager Peter Harker, with the aero package designed by Triple Eight Race Engineering's Ludo Lacroix in conjunction with Doug Skinner from the Holden Racing Team. The VF Commodore race car prototype, fitted with VE Commodore body panels, ran for the first time on 13 October 2012 at Holden's Lang Lang Proving Ground as part of the series' aerodynamic validation. The homologated version of the VF Commodore V8 Supercar was first shown by Garry Rogers Motorsport on 11 February 2013; this was followed by an official unveiling by the Holden Racing Team at Holden's headquarters later in the day.

The VF was the first Holden model built to New Generation V8 Supercar regulations, a formula designed to decrease the cost of building and repairing cars. The V8 Supercar version features a 5-litre V8 engine, 18-inch control wheels, a specially designed aerodynamics kit, a polycarbonate windscreen as well as many category control parts. It was the first Holden V8 Supercar to feature an end-mounted rear wing since the VP Commodore in the 1990s. Only certain body panels are common between the road car and the V8 Supercar, as well as the headlights and tail lamps, with the rest of the components being custom made by each team.

The VF had a successful debut at the 2013 Clipsal 500, with Craig Lowndes and Shane van Gisbergen taking their cars to victory in the two races. Van Gisbergen also claimed both pole positions. The VF Commodore won twenty-eight of the thirty-six races in 2013, with Triple Eight Race Engineering, Tekno Autosports, Brad Jones Racing, Garry Rogers Motorsport and the Holden Racing Team all taking wins in the new Commodore. Holden secured the 2013 Manufacturers' Championship with fourteen races remaining in the season. Jamie Whincup won the championship in his Commodore, ahead of Triple Eight Race Engineering teammate Lowndes.

The VF Commodore secured its first Bathurst 1000 win at the 2015 race by the Red Bull Racing Australia team with Craig Lowndes and Steven Richards.

In 2017 the VF Commodore driven by Jamie Whincup won the Supercars championship in final race after McLaughlin was penalized for causing Whincup's teammate Craig Lowndes to hit the wall, damaging his suspension.

== Advertising ==
As part of the VF Commodore launch in Australia, two television commercials were produced. The 'Turns Heads. Changes Minds.' commercial demonstrated the vehicle's available head-up display and Automatic Parking Assist feature. The 'Think now. Think Tomorrow. Think Holden.' is centered around a patriotic support theme. In conjunction with the launch of the VF Series II, a television commercial titled "Power Ahead" was also released.
