= Troy Bayliss =

Australian motorcycle racer

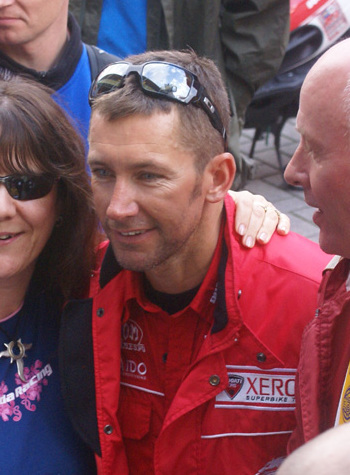
- Bayliss in 2006
- Nationality: Australian
- Born: 30 March 1969 (age 57); Taree, New South Wales, Australia
- Current team: Desmosport Ducati
- Bike number: 21
Motorcycle racing career statistics
Grand Prix motorcycle racing
Active years	1997, 2003–2006
First race	1997 250cc Australian Grand Prix
Last race	2006 MotoGP Valencian Community Grand Prix
First win	2006 MotoGP Valencian Community Grand Prix
Last win	2006 MotoGP Valencian Community Grand Prix
Team(s)	Suzuki, Ducati, Honda
Championships	0
Starts / Wins / Podiums / Poles / F. laps / Points; 45 / 1 / 5 / 0 / 0 / 288
Superbike World Championship
Active years	2000–2002, 2006–2008, 2015
Manufacturers	Ducati
Championships	3 (2001, 2006, 2008)
2015 championship position	24th (15 pts)
Starts / Wins / Podiums / Poles / F. laps / Points; 156 / 52 / 94 / 26 / 35 / 2442

Troy Andrew Bayliss (born 30 March 1969 in Taree, New South Wales, Australia) is an Australian motorcycle racer. During his career Bayliss won the Superbike World Championship three times and a MotoGP race, all with Ducati. He finished his career after winning the 2008 World Superbike title. His 52 World Superbike victories ranks fifth all time in the history of the championship behind Jonathan Rea, Toprak Razgatlioglu, Álvaro Bautista and Carl Fogarty. His son with Kim Bayliss is named Oli Bayliss, he competes in the World Supersport Championship.

== Early life ==
Bayliss did much of his growing up in the Northwest NSW town of Warialda. His father, Warren, was a baker, and his mother Lorraine drove a local school bus part-time. The family lived across from the local high school. By the age of ten, he was an accomplished motocross rider, and could often be found riding through the local bushland which surrounded the town and came right up to the back of the family house. The family moved to Taree when Bayliss was about 11 years old.

Bayliss showed much promise as a youngster in the sport, however when he entered his teens his enthusiasm for racing waned. He commenced an apprenticeship as a spraypainter at Joe Berry's and commuted to work by bicycle. On this daily commute Bayliss would pass a motorcycle dealership and finally was tempted enough to obtain a loan to purchase a Kawasaki ZXR 750 on which he commenced racing. He won the first race he entered on the bike and performed well in subsequent events. As a result of this early success and despite the financial risk he was taking, Bayliss decided to compete in the Australian Supersport championship, Age 26.

== Career ==
=== Early career ===
After finishing as runner-up in the Australian supersport championship in 1995, Bayliss moved up to the Australian Superbikes series the next year, finishing third that year and second in 1997.

Bayliss' big break came that year – he was entered as a wildcard for the 1997 Australian 250 Grand Prix riding for the Dutch Arie Molenaar Suzuki team. On a significantly underpowered machine compared to his competitors, Bayliss finished in sixth despite exiting the final corner in third place, such was the lack of power of his machine.

Bayliss' remarkable performance on a clearly underpowered machine earned him considerable attention, and he was subsequently offered a ride in the British championship with the new GSE Ducati team the next year. His first win came in race 11 at Oulton Park, followed by another win at race 20 at Silverstone, but a large number of crashes and mechanical failures prevented a serious title challenge. This changed in 1999, Bayliss beating Chris Walker to the title.

=== Superbike World Championship ===
Bayliss began the 2000 season competing for Ducati in the US's AMA Superbike Championship, but was called in to replace Carl Fogarty in the Superbike World Championship when the latter was injured at Philip Island. Despite missing the first three rounds and having a poor start at his first race in Sugo, Bayliss had a creditable season, winning two races and earning sixth overall in the championship.

In the 2001 season, Bayliss opened with four seconds in five races, and took his first victory in race 8 at Monza. His consistent performances and six race wins paved for the way for the championship title, defeating reigning champion Colin Edwards. Bayliss clinched the title in the penultimate meeting at Assen when Edwards broke down, however he failed to earn any points in the final meeting after crashing in race 1 and suffering a broken collarbone.

Bayliss started 2002 in dominant form breaking the record (at the time) for most race wins in a season, but Edwards thanks to his consistency in usually minimizing the points lost when Bayliss won by finishing second overturned the advantage, Edwards won his second title at a thrilling final round in Imola. Bayliss crossed the line first in race one, but lost on aggregate, as the first part of race one being red flagged because of an oil leak by Peter Goddard's Benelli. Incidentally, Peter Goddard vacated his seat on the Suzuki superbike in the Australian series in 1997 and recommended Bayliss for his position.

In retrospect, the 2002 season had been lost partially due to mishaps created by his own team. Bayliss was injured at Brands Hatch when colliding with his teammate Ruben Xaus, while Xaus was swerving to bring heat into his tyres, and after the Laguna Seca round, Ducati changed the frame. This frame change would prove costly as Bayliss consistently complained that the bike didn't feel like the same machine he had been riding previously. It was only at the final round in Imola that the team reverted to the original frame. Bayliss was very competitive all weekend.

=== MotoGP World Championship ===
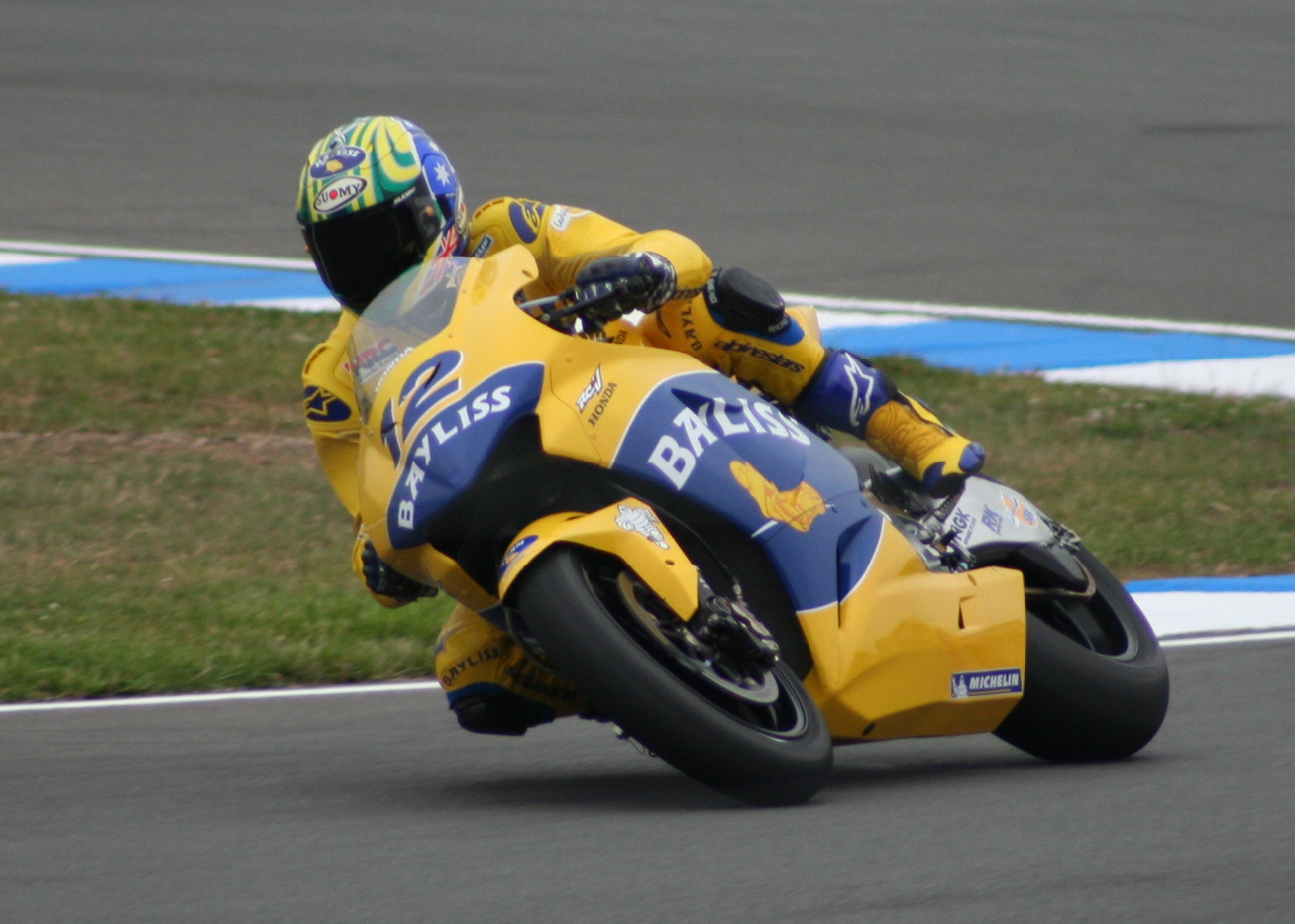
Bayliss in the 2005 MotoGP season on a Honda RC211V

Both Bayliss and Edwards moved to MotoGP in 2003, and it was Bayliss who was initially more successful. In Ducati's first season in the class their bike was highly competitive, with Bayliss taking three third places and finishing sixth overall in the championship. He briefly led at Philip Island, Brno and Welkom, and only narrowly losing the rookie of the year race to Nicky Hayden. Teammate Loris Capirossi took their first win at the Circuit de Catalunya.

2004 was a difficult year for the team however, with Bayliss only 14th in the standings. Despite (or perhaps due to) its prodigious straight-line speed the bike didn't handle well, with Bayliss often over-riding and crashing frequently, this led to Bayliss' subsequent sacking from the factory Ducati squad, a part of which Bayliss had been for five years previous. This move was considered an unpopular one by many, considering that neither Bayliss nor Capirossi were able to perform as well as they had the previous year.

According to some, confirmation that Bayliss' sacking was influenced by sponsorship pressure rather than any performance based reasons was seen in the appointment of Carlos Checa as Bayliss' replacement. However, Bayliss is much older than Capirossi, and had not been as close to him in 2004 as he had in 2003, so some questioned whether he had any more to offer the team.

However, good results near the end of the season earned him a ride with Sito Pons' Camel Honda team for 2005, but was not a frontrunner, despite promising speed shown in his first tests on the 2004 machine and Alex Barros winning in Portugal. A severely broken arm meant that Bayliss was unable to compete in the final six races, had he done so, the season ending Valencian Grand Prix would have been his 50th Grand Prix appearance. Bayliss did give an insight as to his inability to crack into the upper echelons of Grand Prix racing, describing the Honda MotoGP bike and MotoGP bikes in general as too inflexible, rigid, and like a 250 for his style.

After the success of 2006 Superbike, Ducati offered Bayliss a one-off entry in the final MotoGP race of the year in Valencia, due to Sete Gibernau being injured. Remarkably, Bayliss qualified 2nd and led the whole race, which ended in a Ducati 1–2. This was the first time any rider had won a race in both the Superbike and the Grand Prix world championships in the same year, and the first by a reigning champion. His impressive victory was somewhat overshadowed by the dramatic events involving Valentino Rossi and Nicky Hayden that ultimately determined the 2006 title winner.

=== Return to Superbike ===
Bayliss in the 2006 Superbike World Championship on a Ducati 999 F06

After a rather unsuccessful journey in MotoGP and a particularly disappointing 2005 season, Bayliss returned to the Superbike World Championship in 2006 and was reunited with factory Ducati team.

Bayliss' pre-season form in testing for 2006 showed much promise, with Bayliss topping the timesheets at both Qatar and Valencia. Even more remarkable is the fact that both he and Troy Corser were lapping faster at Qatar than many MotoGP contenders from the previous season, despite MotoGP bikes being purpose built racing prototypes and Superbikes being based on road-going machines.

Bayliss started 2006 in dominant fashion, leading the points table after the first five rounds with seven consecutive race wins and additional podiums. His form continued to the point that he went into round 10 at Lausitzring with a chance of clinching the title with three rounds to go. A fall in race one prevented this, but he only required a fourth place in any of the final four races to seal the title. Bayliss duly won the title at Imola with a fifth place in Race 1, which was enough as James Toseland did not win. He won race 2, to cement the title.

Although he scored an impressive win in the final MotoGP race of 2006 at Valencia, Bayliss continued to race in WSBK with the Ducati team in 2007.

On 1 April 2007, at Donington Park, Bayliss crashed at Coppice corner on lap six of the first Superbike race of the day. His right hand was momentarily caught under the motorcycle during the crash, and the injury required the eventual surgical removal of a testicle and of the intermediate and distal phalanges of his little finger. Bayliss' injury prevented him from competing in the second Donington race. He finished the season fourth overall.

2008 saw Bayliss continue racing for the factory Ducati team, riding the new Ducati 1098. At the season opener at the Losail circuit in Qatar, Bayliss won the race one to give Ducati their first win with the new 1098 model. He also won both races at Philip Island on what was his final appearance at his home round. At Misano he took his record to nine podiums in ten starts at the track. Conversely, his victory in race 1 at Donington Park was his first win at the circuit. He came within three corners of clinching the title at Vallelunga, but crashed out at a low-speed corner which meant that Troy Corser and Noriyuki Haga retained a mathematical hope. He clinched the title in the next round by finishing 3rd at Magny Cours, and put the seal on it by winning race 2 – his 50th World Superbike victory. He took a double victory in his final World Superbike meeting at Portimão.

Bayliss tested a Ducati 1198 in a special private test at Mugello in May 2010, setting impressive times and leading to speculation that he would make a comeback to racing

In February 2015, Bayliss made the comeback, when he was called to replace injured Ducati rider Davide Giugliano at Phillip Island opener, riding the unfamiliar 1199 Panigale R.

=== Touring/GT Cars ===
Bayliss has since embarked on a new career after signing to drive as co-driver for Triple F Racing in the domestic V8 Supercar touring car series. He teamed with their regular driver Dean Fiore at the Phillip Island 500 and Bathurst 1000 long-distance events. They broke an alternator and did not start the Phillip Island race and did not finish the Bathurst 1000.

Bayliss also has raced as a co-driver in the 2013 and 2014 Australian Porsche Carrera Cup Championship.

=== ASBK Comeback ===
Now aged 49, Bayliss came out of retirement again with his DesmoSport Ducati team to pursue his maiden Australian title. He finished the 2018 ASBK season in third. Bayliss took delivery of the new factory Ducati Panigale V4R and switched to race number 32 for the 2019 season, but a crash in Free Practice at the opening Round of the season left him with a finger injury on his right hand and he elected to extend his break from riding to have metalwork removed from his foot. Bayliss suffered a subsequent injury following a bicycle accident in 2021.

=== Riding accident ===
In August 2025, Bayliss reportedly suffered serious injuries after a riding incident. He explained on his personal Instagram account that the incident resulted in a broken collarbone, seven ribs, and a punctured lung. Prior to the incident, Bayliss was also reportedly struggling with an injury to his left ankle from a motocross accident.

== Career statistics ==
=== Grand Prix motorcycle racing ===
==== By season ====
Season	Class	Motorcycle	Team	Race	Win	Podium	Pole	FLap	Pts	Plcd	WCh
1997	250cc	Suzuki		1	0	0	0	0	10	27th	–
2003	MotoGP	Ducati	Ducati Marlboro Team	16	0	3	0	0	128	6th	–
2004	MotoGP	Ducati	Ducati Marlboro Team	16	0	1	0	0	71	14th	–
2005	MotoGP	Honda	Camel Honda	11	0	0	0	0	54	15th	–
2006	MotoGP	Ducati	Ducati Marlboro Team	1	1	1	0	0	25	19th	–
Total				**45**	**1**	**5**	**0**	**0**	**288**		**0**

==== Races by year ====
(key) (Races in bold indicate pole position, races in italics indicate fastest lap)

Year	Class	Bike	1	2	3	4	5	6	7	8	9	10	11	12	13	14	15	16	17	Pos	Pts
1997	250cc	Suzuki	MAL	JPN	SPA	ITA	AUT	FRA	NED	IMO	GER	BRA	GBR	CZE	CAT	INA	AUS; 6			27th	10
2003	MotoGP	Ducati	JPN; 5	RSA; 4	SPA; 3	FRA; Ret	ITA; Ret	CAT; 10	NED; 9	GBR; 5	GER; 3	CZE; 3	POR; 6	BRA; 10	PAC; Ret	MAL; 9	AUS; Ret	VAL; 7		6th	128
2004	MotoGP	Ducati	RSA; 14	SPA; Ret	FRA; 8	ITA; 4	CAT; Ret	NED; Ret	BRA; Ret	GER; Ret	GBR; 5	CZE; Ret	POR; 8	JPN; Ret	QAT; Ret	MAL; 10	AUS; 9	VAL; 3		14th	71
2005	MotoGP	Honda	SPA; 6	POR; 11	CHN; Ret	FRA; 10	ITA; 13	CAT; 8	NED; 11	USA; 6	GBR; Ret	GER; Ret	CZE; 9	JPN	MAL	QAT	AUS	TUR	VAL	15th	54
2006	MotoGP	Ducati	SPA	QAT	TUR	CHN	FRA	ITA	CAT	NED	GBR	GER	USA	CZE	MAL	AUS	JPN	POR	VAL; 1	19th	25

=== Superbike World Championship ===
==== Races by year ====
(key) (Races in bold indicate pole position, races in italics indicate fastest lap)

Year	Bike	1		2		3		4		5		6		7		8		9		10		11		12		13		14		Pos	Pts
Year	Bike	R1	R2	R1	R2	R1	R2	R1	R2	R1	R2	R1	R2	R1	R2	R1	R2	R1	R2	R1	R2	R1	R2	R1	R2	R1	R2	R1	R2	Pos	Pts
1997	Suzuki	AUS; 5	AUS; 5	SMR	SMR	GBR	GBR	GER	GER	ITA	ITA	USA	USA	EUR	EUR	AUT	AUT	NED	NED	SPA	SPA	JPN	JPN	INA	INA					20th	22
1998	Ducati	AUS	AUS	GBR; Ret	GBR; Ret	ITA	ITA	SPA	SPA	GER	GER	SMR	SMR	RSA	RSA	USA	USA	EUR; 13	EUR; 15	AUT	AUT	NED	NED	JPN	JPN					40th	4
2000	Ducati	RSA	RSA	AUS	AUS	JPN; Ret	JPN; Ret	GBR	GBR	ITA; 4	ITA; 4	GER; 1	GER; 4	SMR; 2	SMR; 2	SPA; 4	SPA; 3	**USA**; Ret	**USA**; 7	EUR; 1	EUR; 2	NED; Ret	NED; Ret	GER; 3	GER; 2	GBR; 2	GBR; Ret			6th	243
2001	Ducati	SPA; 2	SPA; 2	RSA; 2	RSA; 2	AUS; 3	AUS; C	JPN; 13	JPN; 15	**ITA**; 1	**ITA**; 1	GBR; 13	GBR; 9	GER; 2	GER; 1	SMR; 1	SMR; 2	USA; 4	USA; 4	EUR; 5	EUR; 3	GER; Ret	GER; 3	**NED**; 1	**NED**; 1	ITA; Ret	ITA; DNS			1st	369
2002	Ducati	**SPA**; 1	**SPA**; 1	AUS; 1	AUS; 1	RSA; 1	RSA; 1	JPN; 5	JPN; 4	ITA; 1	ITA; 1	**GBR**; 5	**GBR**; 1	**GER**; 1	**GER**; 1	**SMR**; 1	**SMR**; 1	USA; 1	USA; 2	GBR; 3	GBR; 2	GER; 2	GER; 2	NED; 2	NED; Ret	ITA; 2	ITA; 2			2nd	541
2006	Ducati	**QAT**; 2	**QAT**; 2	**AUS**; 6	**AUS**; 1	SPA; 1	SPA; 1	ITA; 1	ITA; 1	EUR; 1	EUR; 1	SMR; 1	SMR; 12	CZE; Ret	CZE; 8	**GBR**; 1	**GBR**; 2	NED; Ret	NED; 1	**GER**; 7	**GER**; 3	**ITA**; 5	**ITA**; 1	FRA; 4	FRA; 1					1st	431
2007	Ducati	QAT; 5	QAT; 8	**AUS**; 1	**AUS**; 2	**EUR**; Ret	**EUR**; DNS	**SPA**; 3	**SPA**; 6	NED; 4	NED; 1	ITA; 2	ITA; 3	**GBR**; 1	**GBR**; C	SMR; 1	SMR; 1	CZE; Ret	CZE; 6	**GBR**; Ret	**GBR**; 7	GER; 4	GER; 1	**ITA**; 2	**ITA**; 1	FRA; 2	FRA; 5			4th	372
2008	Ducati	QAT; 1	QAT; 4	**AUS**; 1	**AUS**; 1	SPA; 2	SPA; 2	**NED**; 1	**NED**; 1	**ITA**; 3	**ITA**; Ret	USA; Ret	USA; 22	GER; 2	GER; 4	SMR; 3	SMR; 3	**CZE**; 1	**CZE**; 1	**GBR**; 2	**GBR**; 11	**EUR**; 1	**EUR**; Ret	**ITA**; 6	**ITA**; 16	FRA; 3	FRA; 1	**POR**; 1	**POR**; 1	1st	460
2015	Ducati	AUS; 13	AUS; 16	THA; 9	THA; 11	SPA	SPA	NED	NED	ITA	ITA	GBR	GBR	POR	POR	SMR	SMR	USA	USA	MAL	MAL	SPA	SPA	FRA	FRA	QAT	QAT			24th	15

=== Complete V8 Supercar results ===
Year	Team	1	2	3	4	5	6	7	8	9	10	11	12	13	14	15	16	17	18	19	20	21	22	23	24	25	26	27	Pos	Pts
2009	Triple F Racing	ADE; R1	ADE; R2	HAM; R3	HAM; R4	WIN; R5	WIN; R6	SYM; R7	SYM; R8	HDV; R9	HDV; R10	TOW; R11	TOW; R12	SAN; R13	SAN; R14	QLD; R15	QLD; R16	PHI; Q 29	PHI; R17; DNS	BAT; R18; Ret	SUR; R19	SUR; R20	PHI; R21	PHI; R22	PTH; R23	PTH; R22	SYD; R23	SYD; R24	65th	27

=== Complete Bathurst 1000 results ===
Year	Team	Car	Co-driver	Position	Laps
2009	Triple F Racing	Holden VE Commodore	(Australia) Dean Fiore	DNF	59

== Bibliography ==
- Bayliss, Troy (27 August 2009). Troy Bayliss: My Life My Career. Edit Vallardi. ISBN 978-8895684130.
- Bayliss, Troy; Trevitt, Andrew (16 July 2014). Troy Bayliss: A Faster Way. David Bull Publishing. ISBN 978-1935007227.
- Flack, Darryl (30 August 2023). The Immortals of Australian Motorcycle Racing: The World Champs (Part of the 7-volume comprehensive sports collection). Immortals of Australian Sport (7-book series). Gelding Street Press. ISBN 978-0-6452070-5-7.
