= 2014 Australian Carrera Cup Championship =

Australian motor racing competition

Seasons
- ← 2013 2015 →

The 2014 Australian Carrera Cup Championship was a CAMS sanctioned Australian motor racing title open to Porsche 911 GT3 Cup cars. Porsche Cars Australia Pty Ltd was appointed as the Category Manager for the championship, which was the tenth Australian Carrera Cup Championship.

The championship was won by Steven Richards.

== Teams and drivers ==
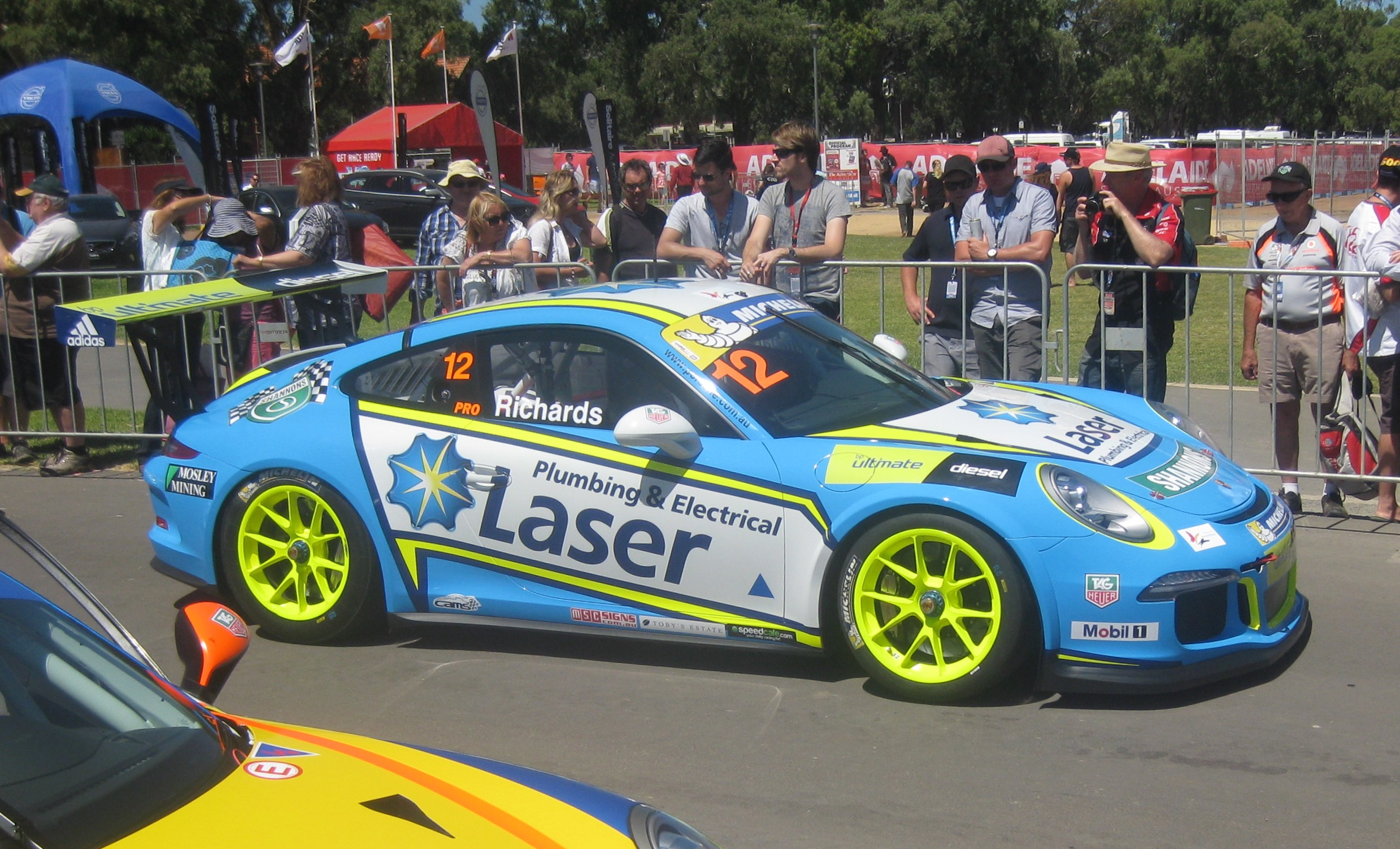
Steven Richards won the championship driving this Laser Plumbing & Electrical entry

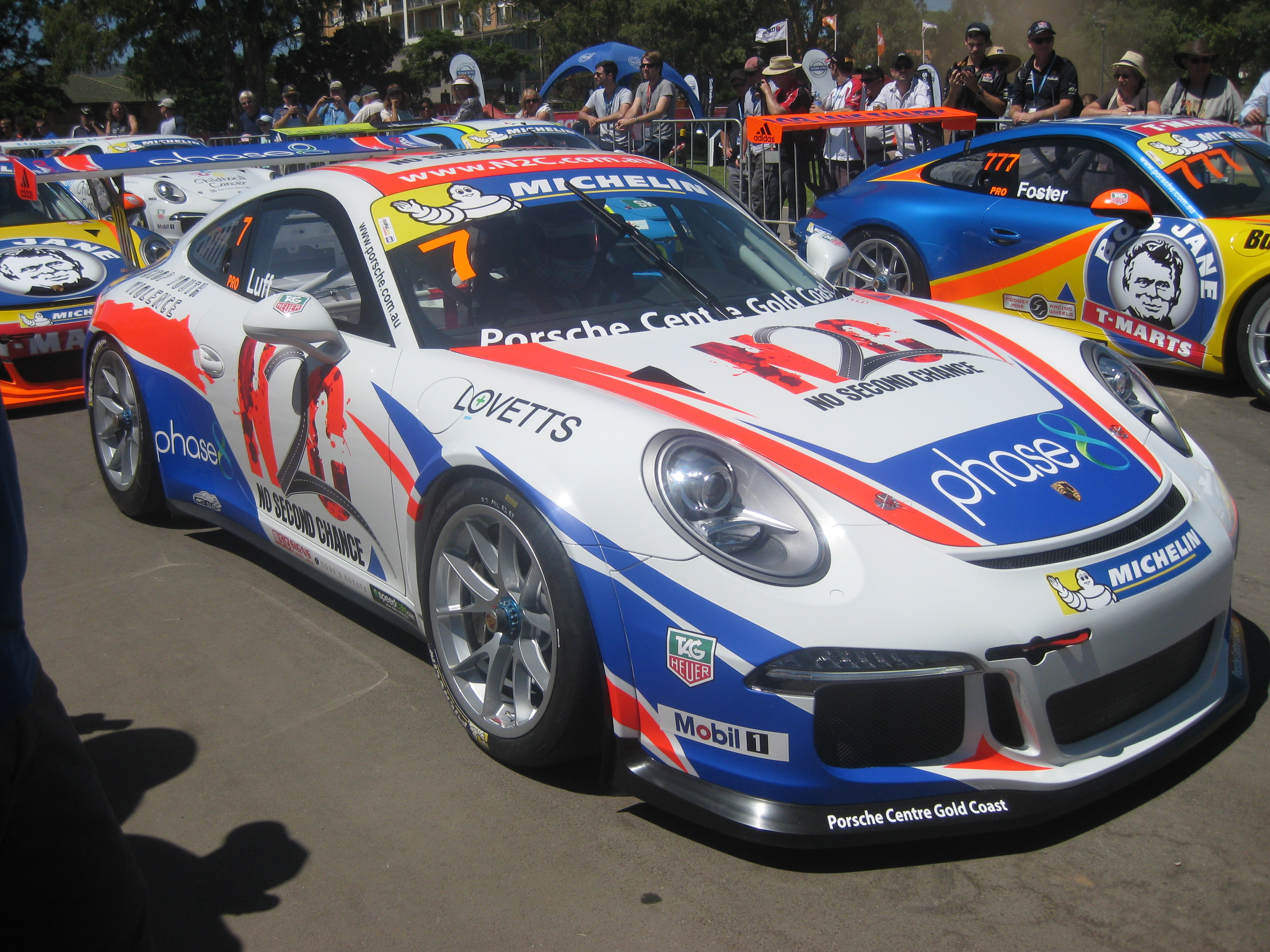
Warren Luff placed second in the championship in this No Second Chance/Phase 8 entry

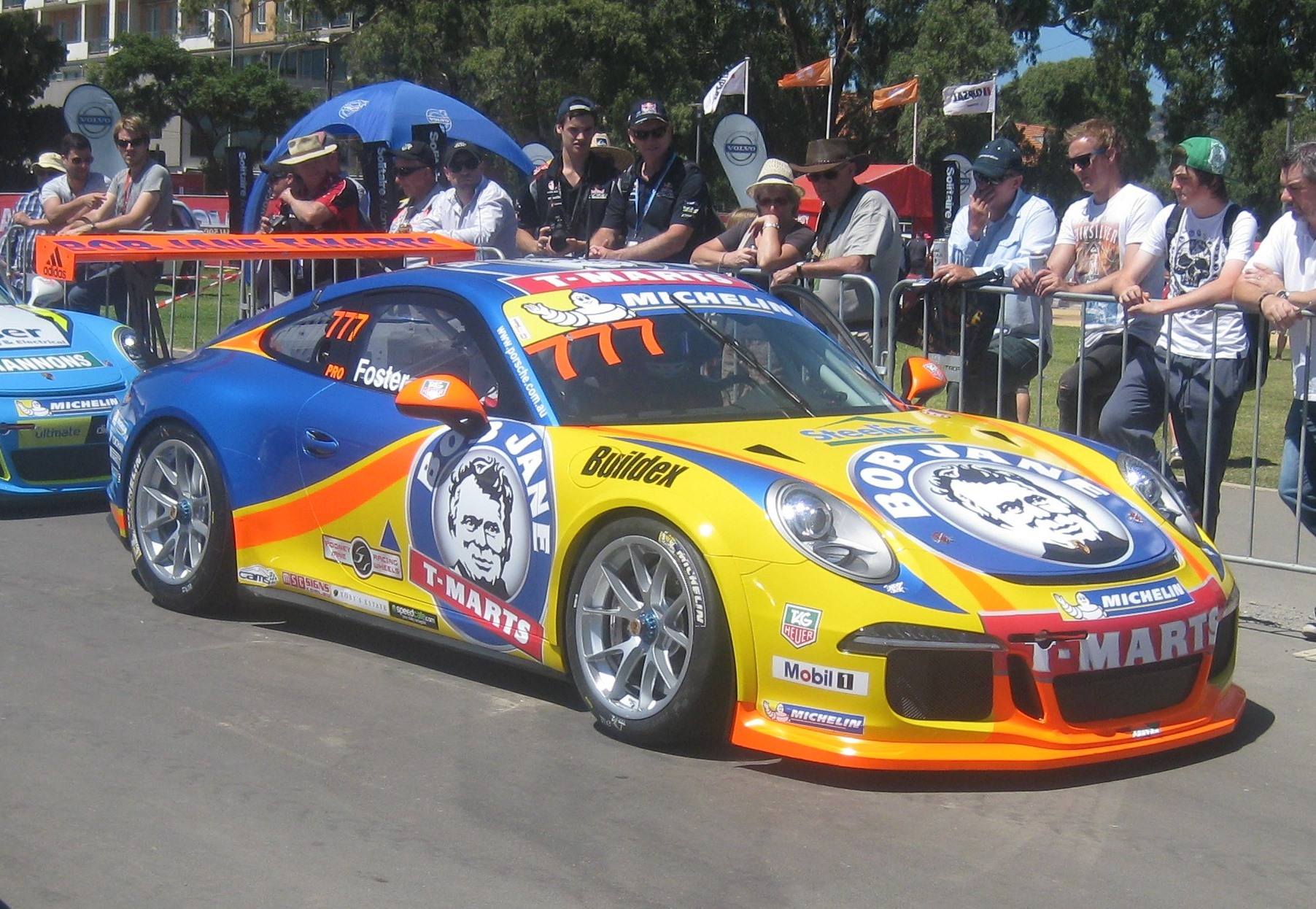
Nick Foster placed fifth in the championship in this Sonic Motor Racing Services entry

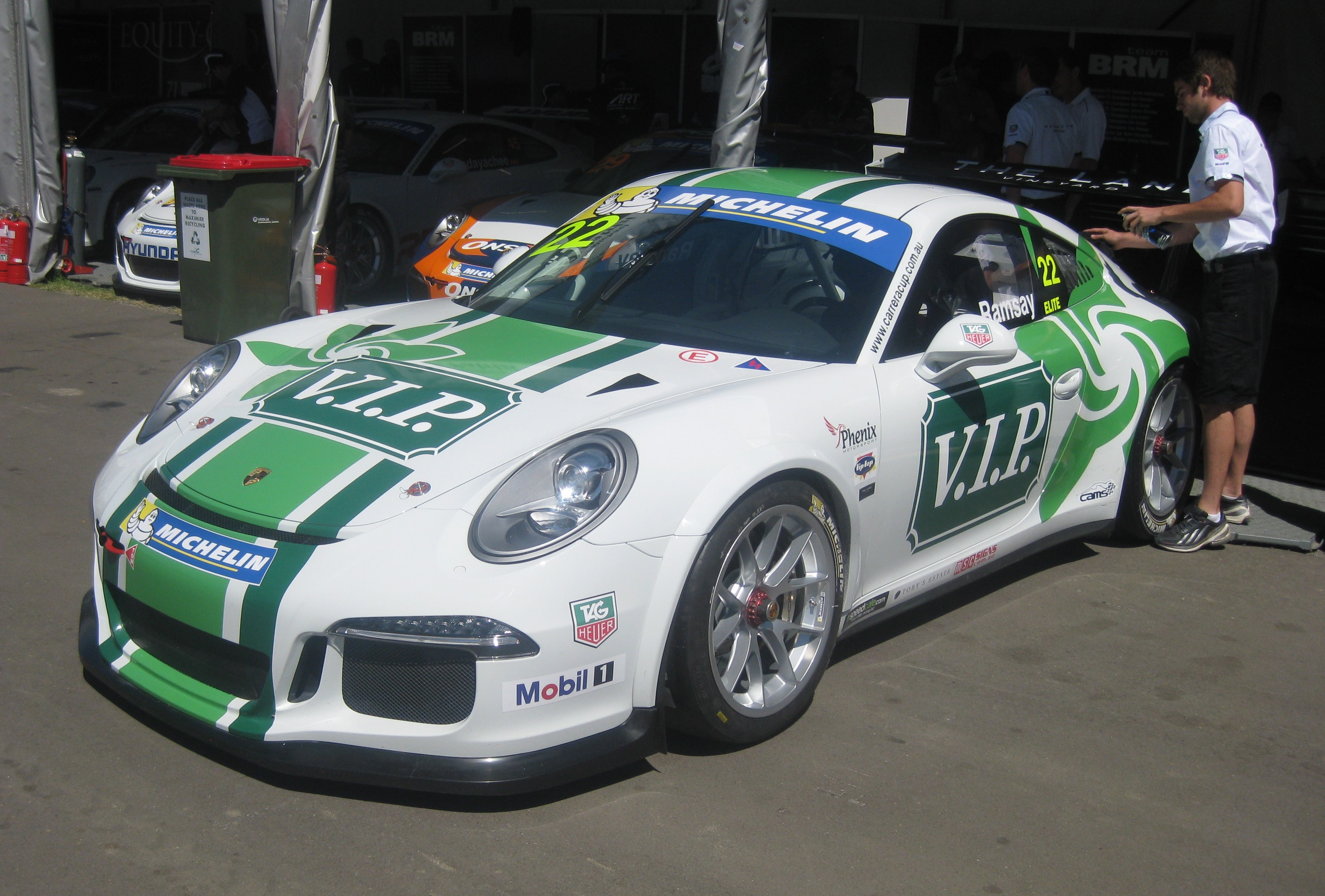
Brenton Ramsay placed 17th in the championship in this Phenix Motorsport entry

The following teams and drivers contested the 2014 Australian Carrera Cup Championship.

| Team | No. | Driver | Co-driver | Class | Rounds |
|---|---|---|---|---|---|
| Alliance Group Racing | 1 | (New Zealand) Craig Baird | (New Zealand) Max Twigg | Pro | All |
| Grove Group | 4 | (Australia) Stephen Grove | (New Zealand) Scott McLaughlin | Elite | All |
| Objective Racing | 5 | (Australia) Tony Walls | (Australia) David Reynolds | Elite | All |
| McElrea Racing | 7 | (Australia) Warren Luff | (Australia) Geoff Emery | Pro | All |
| McElrea Racing | 55 | (Australia) Renee Gracie | (Australia) Tim Miles | Pro | All |
| McElrea Racing | 88 | (Australia) Shae Davies | (Australia) Adam Gowans | Pro | All |
| Hallmarc | 9 | (Australia) Marc Cini | (Australia) Dean Fiore | Elite | 1–4, 6–8 |
| Finance EZI Racing | 10 | (Australia) Maurice Pickering | | Elite | 1–2, 4–8 |
| Garth Walden Racing | 11 | (Australia) Ash Samadi | (New Zealand) Jonny Reid | Elite | All |
| Steve Richards Motorsport | 12 | (New Zealand) Steven Richards | (Australia) Damien Flack | Pro | All |
| Steve Richards Motorsport | 13 | (Australia) James Bergmuller | (Australia) Dale Wood | Elite | All |
| Phenix Motorsport | 22 | (Australia) Brenton Ramsay | (Australia) Jason Bright | Elite | All |
| Lago Racing | 23 | (Australia) Roger Lago | (Australia) David Russell | Elite | 1–6 |
| Lago Racing | 23 | (Australia) David Russell | | Pro | 7–8 |
| Tony Bates Racing | 24 | (Australia) Tony Bates | (New Zealand) Daniel Gaunt | Elite | All |
| Almond Racing | 26 | (Australia) Michael Almond | (Australia) John Karytinos | Pro | All |
| Team BRM | 27 | (Australia) Sam Power | (Australia) James Koundouris | Pro | All |
| Team BRM | 29 | (Australia) Michael Patrizi | (Australia) Troy Bayliss | Pro | 1–7 |
| Team BRM | 45 | (Australia) Duvashen Padayachee | (Australia) Neale Muston | Pro | All |
| David Wall Racing | 38 | (Australia) Greg Taylor | | Elite | 5–6, 8 |
| Sonic Motor Racing Services | 39 | (Australia) Adrian Mastronardo | (Australia) Tim Slade | Elite | All |
| Sonic Motor Racing Services | 77 | (Australia) Nick McBride | (Australia) Rodney Jane | Pro | All |
| Sonic Motor Racing Services | 777 | (Australia) Nick Foster | (Australia) Ryan Simpson | Pro | All |
| Hamilton Autohaus | 56 | (Australia) Shane Smollen | (Australia) Nick Percat | Elite | All |
| Equity-One | 71 | (Australia) Dean Koutsoumidis | | Elite | 1–2 |
| Scott Taylor Motorsport | 222 | (Australia) Scott Taylor | | Elite | 5–8 |

Note: All teams competed with the Porsche 911 GT3 Cup Type 991, which was the only model eligible for the championship.

== Race calendar ==
The championship was contested over an eight round series.

| Round | Circuit | City / state | Date | Format | Winning driver(s) |
|---|---|---|---|---|---|
| 1 | (South Australia) Adelaide Street Circuit | Adelaide, South Australia | 27 February—2 March | Three races | Warren Luff |
| 2 | (Victoria (state)) Albert Park Grand Prix Circuit | Melbourne, Victoria | 13—16 March | Three races | Warren Luff |
| 3 | (Victoria (state)) Phillip Island Grand Prix Circuit | Phillip Island, Victoria | 23–25 May | Two races | Stephen Grove; Scott McLaughlin |
| 4 | (Queensland) Townsville Street Circuit | Townsville, Queensland | 4—6 July | Three races | Steven Richards |
| 5 | (New South Wales) Sydney Motorsport Park | Eastern Creek, New South Wales | 22–24 August | Three races | Craig Baird |
| 6 | (Victoria (state)) Sandown Raceway | Melbourne, Victoria | 12–14 September | Three races | Michael Patrizi |
| 7 | (New South Wales) Mount Panorama Circuit | Bathurst, New South Wales | 9—12 October | Three races | Shae Davies |
| 8 | (Queensland) Surfers Paradise Street Circuit | Surfers Paradise, Queensland | 24—26 October | Three races | Nick Foster |

== Points system ==
Championship points were awarded to the first 25 finishers in each race as per the following table.

| Position | 1st | 2nd | 3rd | 4th | 5th | 6th | 7th | 8th | 9th | 10th | 11th | 12th | 13th | 14th | 15th | 16th | 17th | 18th | 19th | 20th | 21st | 22nd | 23rd | 24th | 25th |
|---|---|---|---|---|---|---|---|---|---|---|---|---|---|---|---|---|---|---|---|---|---|---|---|---|---|
| Points | 60 | 54 | 48 | 42 | 36 | 32 | 29 | 26 | 23 | 20 | 18 | 16 | 14 | 12 | 11 | 10 | 9 | 8 | 7 | 6 | 5 | 4 | 3 | 2 | 1 |

In addition to contesting the outright championship, each driver was classified as either Professional or Elite and competed for the relevant class title.

Points were awarded for class places in each race on the same basis as for the outright championship.

The results for each round were determined by the number of championship points scored by each driver at that round.

The driver gaining the highest points total over all rounds was declared the winner of the championship.

Race 2 at the Sandown round was abandoned following a multi-car accident and no championship points were awarded.

== Championship standings ==
=== Overall ===
| Position | Driver | No | Car | Competitor / Team | Points |
| 1 | Steven Richards | 12 | Porsche 911 GT3 Cup Type 991 | Laser Plumbing & Electrical | 954 |
| 2 | Warren Luff | 7 | Porsche 911 GT3 Cup Type 991 | No Second Chance / Phase 8 | 921 |
| 3 | Craig Baird | 1 | Porsche 911 GT3 Cup Type 991 | Bonaire / Wilson Security | 914 |
| 4 | Shae Davies | 88 | Porsche 911 GT3 Cup Type 991 | Davbridge Constructions | 777 |
| 5 | Nick Foster | 777 | Porsche 911 GT3 Cup Type 991 | Sonic Motor Racing Services | 767 |
| 6 | Sam Power | 27 | Porsche 911 GT3 Cup Type 991 | AVCS | 668 |
| 7 | Michael Almond | 26 | Porsche 911 GT3 Cup Type 991 | Copyworld | 551 |
| 8 | Michael Patrizi | 29 | Porsche 911 GT3 Cup Type 991 | Onsite Racing | 525.5 |
| 9 | Nick McBride | 77 | Porsche 911 GT3 Cup Type 991 | Sonic Motor Racing Services | 489 |
| 10 | Stephen Grove | 4 | Porsche 911 GT3 Cup Type 991 | Grove Group | 460 |
| 11 | Duvashen Padayachee | 45 | Porsche 911 GT3 Cup Type 991 | Rentcorp | 406 |
| 12 | Shane Smollen | 56 | Porsche 911 GT3 Cup Type 991 | McGrath Estate Agents | 393 |
| 13 | James Bergmuller | 13 | Porsche 911 GT3 Cup Type 991 | Porsche Brighton | 359 |
| 14 | Tony Bates | 24 | Porsche 911 GT3 Cup Type 991 | Alternative Freight Services | 324 |
| 15 | Renee Gracie | 55 | Porsche 911 GT3 Cup Type 991 | Fujitsu Racing | 322.5 |
| 16 | Tony Walls | 5 | Porsche 911 GT3 Cup Type 991 | Objective Ra | 270 |
| 17 | Brenton Ramsay | 22 | Porsche 911 GT3 Cup Type 991 | Phenix Motorsport | 239.5 |
| 18 | Roger Lago | 23 | Porsche 911 GT3 Cup Type 991 | JBS Swift | 233 |
| 19 | David Russell | 23 | Porsche 911 GT3 Cup Type 991 | JBS Australia | 218 |
| 20 | Ash Samadi | 11 | Porsche 911 GT3 Cup Type 991 | Royal Purple Oil / Garth Walden | 215 |
| 21 | Marc Cini | 9 | Porsche 911 GT3 Cup Type 991 | Hallmarc | 167 |
| 22 | Maurie Pickering | 10 | Porsche 911 GT3 Cup Type 991 | Finance EZI | 126 |
| 23 | Adrian Mastronardo | 39 | Porsche 911 GT3 Cup Type 991 | Adrian Mastronadro | 124 |
| 24 | Scott Taylor | 222 | Porsche 911 GT3 Cup Type 991 | Scott Taylor Motorsport | 64.5 |
| 25 | Greg Taylor | 38 | Porsche 911 GT3 Cup Type 991 | Taylor Motorsport / Adina Apartm | 35 |
| 26 | Dean Koutsoumidis | 71 | Porsche 911 GT3 Cup Type 991 | Equity-One | 31 |

=== Professional Class ===
| Position | Driver | No | Car | Competitor / Team | Points |
| 1 | Steven Richards | 12 | Porsche 911 GT3 Cup Type 991 | Laser Plumbing & Electrical | 972 |
| 2 | Warren Luff | 7 | Porsche 911 GT3 Cup Type 991 | No Second Chance / Phase 8 | 939 |
| 3 | Craig Baird | 1 | Porsche 911 GT3 Cup Type 991 | Bonaire / Wilson Security | 929 |
| 4 | Shae Davies | 88 | Porsche 911 GT3 Cup Type 991 | Davbridge Constructions | 808 |
| 5 | Nick Foster | 777 | Porsche 911 GT3 Cup Type 991 | Sonic Motor Racing Services | 772 |
| 6 | Sam Power | 27 | Porsche 911 GT3 Cup Type 991 | AVCS | 701 |
| 7 | Michael Almond | 26 | Porsche 911 GT3 Cup Type 991 | Copyworld | 618.5 |
| 8 | Michael Patrizi | 29 | Porsche 911 GT3 Cup Type 991 | Onsite Racing | 541.5 |
| 9 | Renee Gracie | 55 | Porsche 911 GT3 Cup Type 991 | Fujitsu Racing | 527 |
| 10 | Nick McBride | 7 | Porsche 911 GT3 Cup Type 991 | Sonic Motor Racing Services | 516 |
| 11 | Duvashen Padayachee | 45 | Porsche 911 GT3 Cup Type 991 | Rentcorp | 439.5 |
| 12 | David Russell | 23 | Porsche 911 GT3 Cup Type 991 | JBS Australia | 236 |

=== Elite Class ===
| Position | Driver | No | Car | Competitor / Team | Points |
| 1 | Stephen Grove | 4 | Porsche 911 GT3 Cup Type 991 | Grove Group | 1046 |
| 2 | Shane Smollen | 56 | Porsche 911 GT3 Cup Type 991 | McGrath Estate Agents | 963 |
| 3 | Tony Bates | 24 | Porsche 911 GT3 Cup Type 991 | Alternative Freight Services | 925 |
| 4 | James Bergmuller | 13 | Porsche 911 GT3 Cup Type 991 | Porsche Brighton | 896 |
| 5 | Tony Walls | 5 | Porsche 911 GT3 Cup Type 991 | Objective Racing | 736 |
| 6 | Brenton Ramsay | 22 | Porsche 911 GT3 Cup Type 991 | Phenix Motorsport | 669 |
| 7 | Roger Lago | 23 | Porsche 911 GT3 Cup Type 991 | JBS Swift | 640 |
| 8 | Ash Samadi | 11 | Porsche 911 GT3 Cup Type 991 | Royal Purple Oil / Garth Walden | 571 |
| 9 | Marc Cini | 9 | Porsche 911 GT3 Cup Type 991 | Hallmarc | 500 |
| 10 | Maurie Pickering | 10 | Porsche 911 GT3 Cup Type 991 | Finance EZI | 407 |
| 11 | Adrian Mastronardo | 39 | Porsche 911 GT3 Cup Type 991 | Adrian Mastronadro | 406 |
| 12 | Scott Taylor | 222 | Porsche 911 GT3 Cup Type 991 | Scott Taylor Motorsport | 196 |
| 13 | Dean Koutsoumidis | 71 | Porsche 911 GT3 Cup Type 991 | Equity-One | 119 |
| 14 | Greg Taylor | 38 | Porsche 911 GT3 Cup Type 991 | Taylor Motorsport / Adina Apartm | 113 |
