= Steven Richards =

New Zealand racing driver (born 1972)

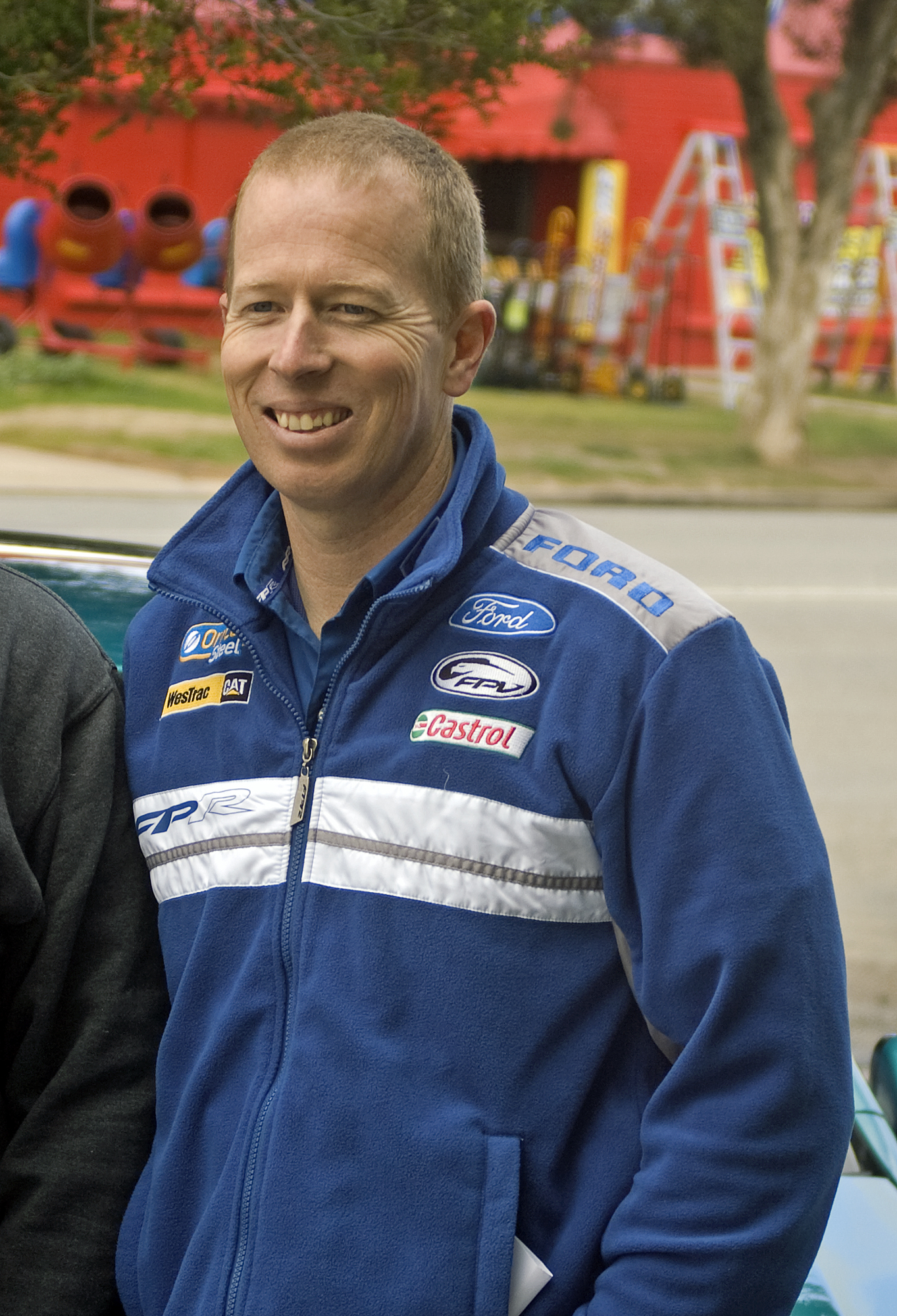
- Richards in 2010
- Nationality: New Zealander
- Born: Steven James Richards; 11 July 1972 (age 54) Auckland, New Zealand

Supercars Championship career
- Championships: 0
- Races: 451
- Wins: 10
- Podiums: 60
- Pole positions: 6
- 2019 position: 37th (438 pts)

Steven James Richards (born 11 July 1972) is a New Zealand-Australian racing driver, currently competing in the Porsche Carrera Cup Australia Championship.

Richards, the son of seven-time Bathurst 1000 winner Jim Richards, is himself a five-time Bathurst 1000 winner, having won the event in 1998, 1999, 2013, 2015 and 2018. Colloquially known as 'Richo', he also won the Bathurst 24 Hour in 2002.

== Career history ==
=== Early career ===
Richards' first major career success was winning the Australian Formula Ford Championship on his second attempt in 1994 for Garry Rogers Motorsport. In 1995, Richards made his debut in the Bathurst 1000, finishing fourth for Gibson Motorsport with Anders Olofsson. Richards continued his association with Garry Rogers Motorsport in the years following, competing in the Australian Super Touring Championship from 1995 to 1997 driving an Alfa Romeo 155, Honda Accord and Nissan Primera and making his Australian Touring Car Championship debut for the team in 1996 in a Holden VR Commodore. Richards competed with his father Jim at the Bathurst 1000 in 1996 and 1997, finishing second in the latter. Richards continued with the team for 1998 before leaving to take up a testing role with Nissan in England.

At the 1998 AMP Bathurst 1000, Richards finished second in a Nissan Primera, only two seconds behind his father Jim. A month later driving a Ford EL Falcon, he won the FAI 1000 with Jason Bright for Stone Brothers Racing.

=== Supercars Championship ===
In 1999, Richards took up a full-time drive with Gibson Motorsport in 1999, as a team-mate to Greg Murphy in a Holden VT Commodore. Richards finished seventh in the championship with the highlight being defending his Bathurst crown with Murphy. By winning his second Bathurst title in a Holden, he became the first driver to win the Bathurst 1000 in both a Ford and Holden, and remains the only driver to do so in consecutive years. Richards continued with Gibson Motorsport in 2000, winning the inaugural Canberra 400 as well as a round at Calder Park Raceway.

In 2001, Richards moved to Ford Tickford Racing. Richards finished 12th in the standings for the team in 2001. With Ford Tickford Racing scaling back to one car, Richards moved to Perkins Engineering in 2002. He continued with the team for five years and achieved consistent championship finishes between fifth and seventh. Richards won two rounds for the team, both at the Perth 400 at Barbagallo Raceway.

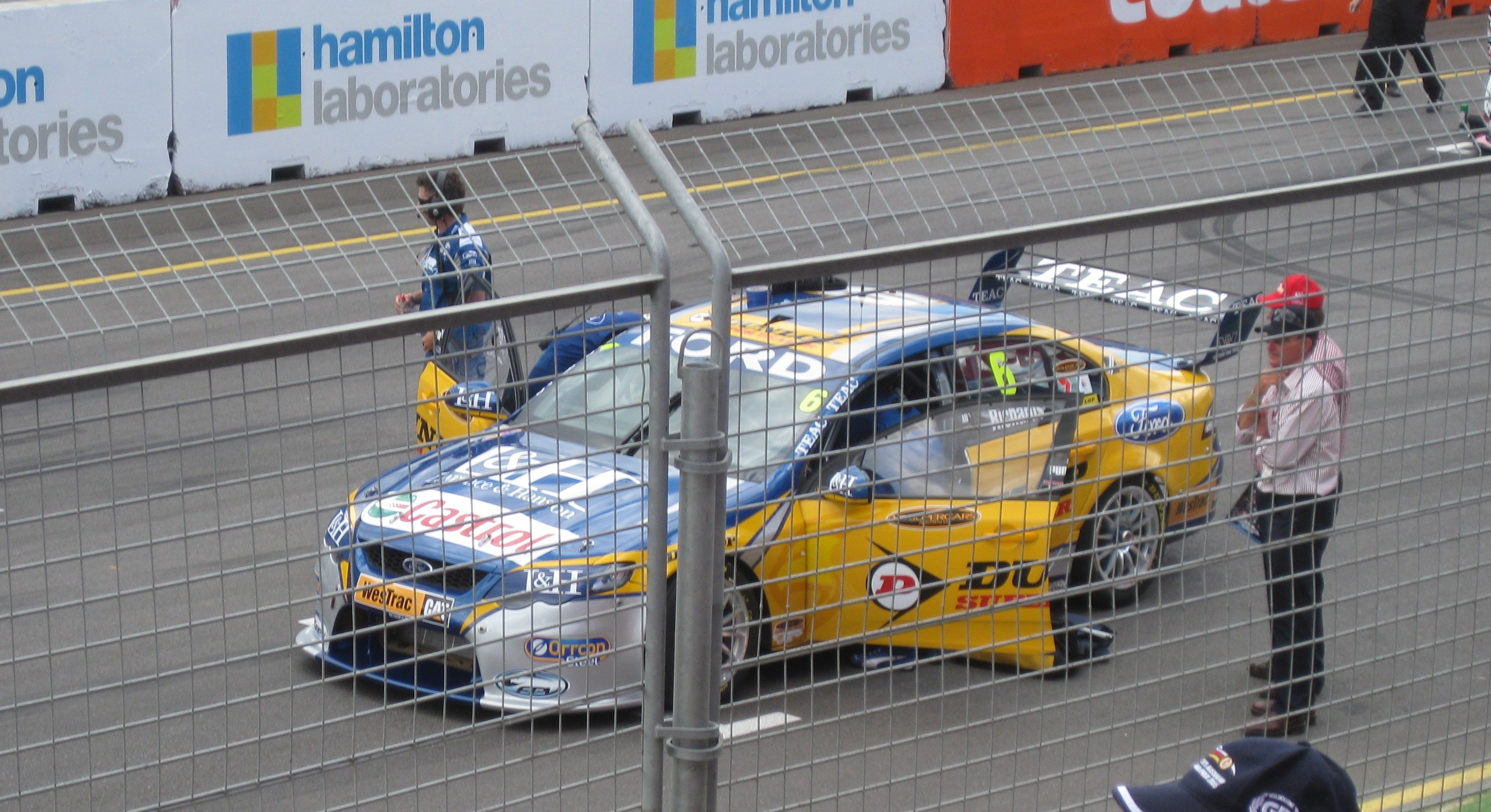
Ford Performance Racing Ford FG Falcon of Steven Richards at the 2010 Clipsal 500 Adelaide

In 2007, Richards made another manufacturer switch, joining Ford Performance Racing. Richards started competitively for the team, with championship finishes of seventh and eighth, but dropped off in 2009 and 2010 with finishes of thirteenth and fifteenth. Richards was subsequently replaced by Will Davison for 2011, and finished his full-time career with a podium in the final race of the season at the Sydney 500. Richards' highlights for the team were winning the Skycity Triple Crown in 2008, and podium finishes at the 2007 Sandown 500 and 2009 Phillip Island 500 with Owen Kelly and Mark Winterbottom respectively. Richards and Winterbottom were leading the 2007 Bathurst 1000 late in the race before Winterbottom went off the track in wet conditions.

==== Endurance co-driver ====
Following his full-time career ending, Richards became a highly sought-after co-driver for V8 Supercars' two endurance events, the Sandown 500 and Bathurst 1000. He decided to stay on with Ford Performance Racing, renewing his partnership with Winterbottom. In 2013, Richards and Winterbottom won the 2013 Bathurst 1000 on their sixth attempt together. It was the first Bathurst victory for Winterbottom and the team, and Richards' first since 1999.

After his success in 2013, Richards was poached by Triple Eight Race Engineering to drive with Craig Lowndes from 2014 onwards in what had become known as the Pirtek Enduro Cup. The move brought Richards a fourth Bathurst victory in 2015. In doing this Richards joined Lowndes, who along with Tony Longhurst and Jamie Whincup had matched the feat of winning in both a Ford and Holden since Richards had achieved it, as the only two drivers to win more than one Bathurst 1000 for both Ford and Holden. Richards won the race again with Lowndes in 2018 winning his Fifth Bathurst crown becoming one of the most successful winners of the great race throughout the current decade and sixth on the all-time list of Bathurst champions.

Richards announced his retirement from Supercars racing after the 2019 season.

=== Endurance racing ===
Richards won the inaugural Bathurst 24 Hour race in 2002 driving a Holden Monaro 427C for Garry Rogers Motorsport. Richards won the race alongside Garth Tander, Cameron McConville and Nathan Pretty. Driving the same car in the 2003 race, the same quartet finished in second place, less than a second behind their teammates Greg Murphy, Todd Kelly, Jason Bright, and Peter Brock, who had formed a famous partnership with his father Jim in the 1970s and 1980s.

Richards competed in the 2014 24 Hours of Spa with Roger Lago, David Russell and Steve Owen, driving a Lamborghini Gallardo LP600+ GT3. They did not finish the race. Richards has also achieved a class victory at the Bathurst 12 Hour, in 2012.

=== Carrera Cup ===
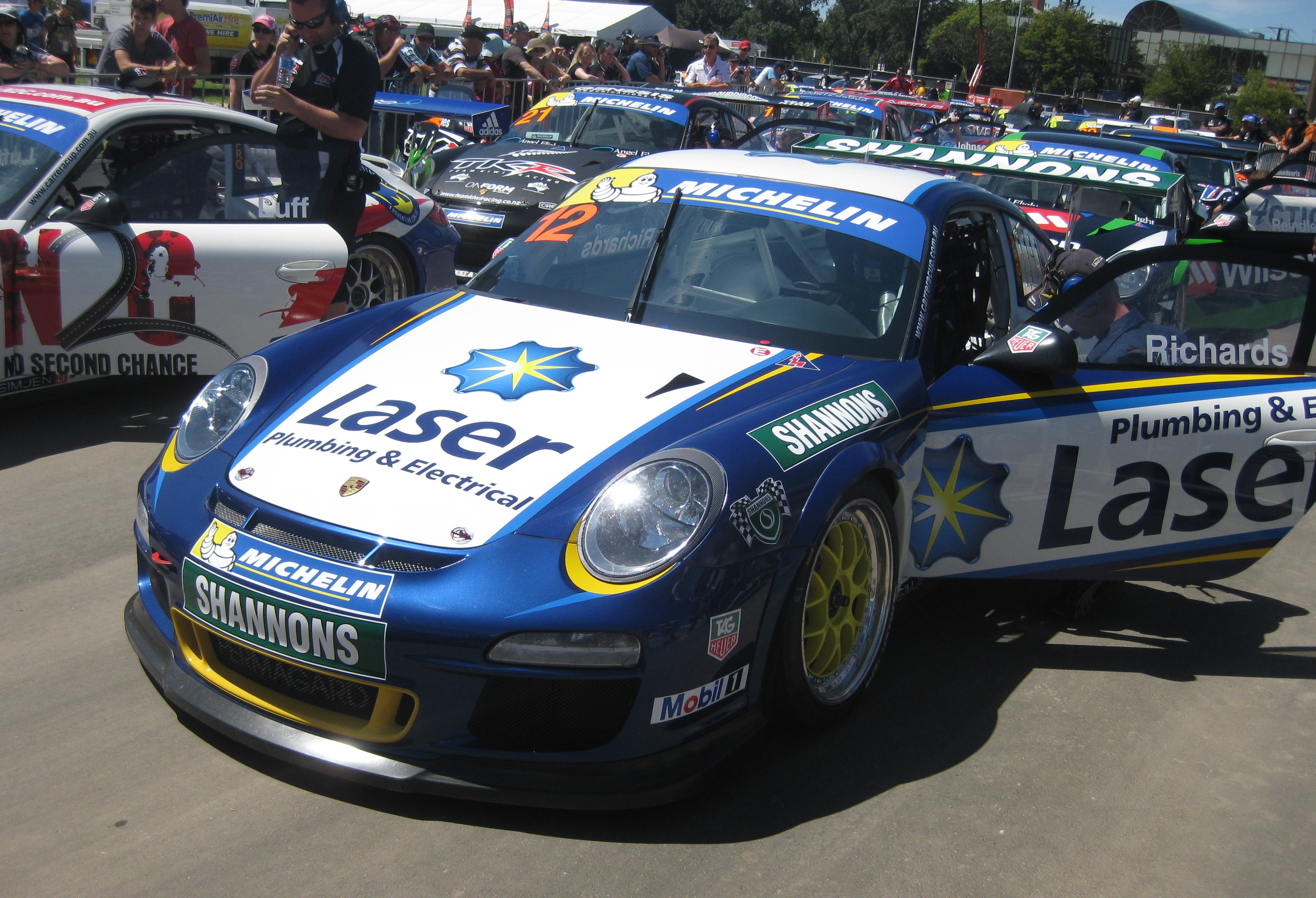
Richards placed fourth in the 2013 Australian Carrera Cup Championship

After the conclusion of his full-time V8 Supercars career, Richards entered the Australian Carrera Cup Championship in 2011 in a team backed by Laser Plumbing & Electrical. He consistently became a top-five championship runner since joining the series. His highlight was in 2014 when he won the championship title and broke the stranglehold on the series held by Craig Baird. It was Richards' first championship title in twenty years. Richards slipped back in the following two years before stepping back from the series to focus on his team's entry in the Australian GT Championship.

=== Australian GT ===
In 2013 and 2014, Richards competed in selected events of the Australian GT Championship in a Lamborghini Gallardo alongside Justin McMillan. They finished fifth in the 2014 championship. Richards then made a one-off appearance in the 2015 season in a Chevrolet Camaro.

In 2016, Richards re-joined the series full-time, this time with his own team, Steven Richards Motorsport. The team became the factory-supported customer entrant for the new BMW M6 GT3 in Australia. The team has also entered two cars in the 2017 Bathurst 12 Hour.

== Personal life ==
Before taking up motor racing full-time, Richards served his apprenticeship as an aircraft engineer.

Richards is married to Angela (m. 1998) and has two children, Clayton (born 2000) and Priya (born 2001).

Richards lives with his family in Melbourne, Victoria.

== Career results ==
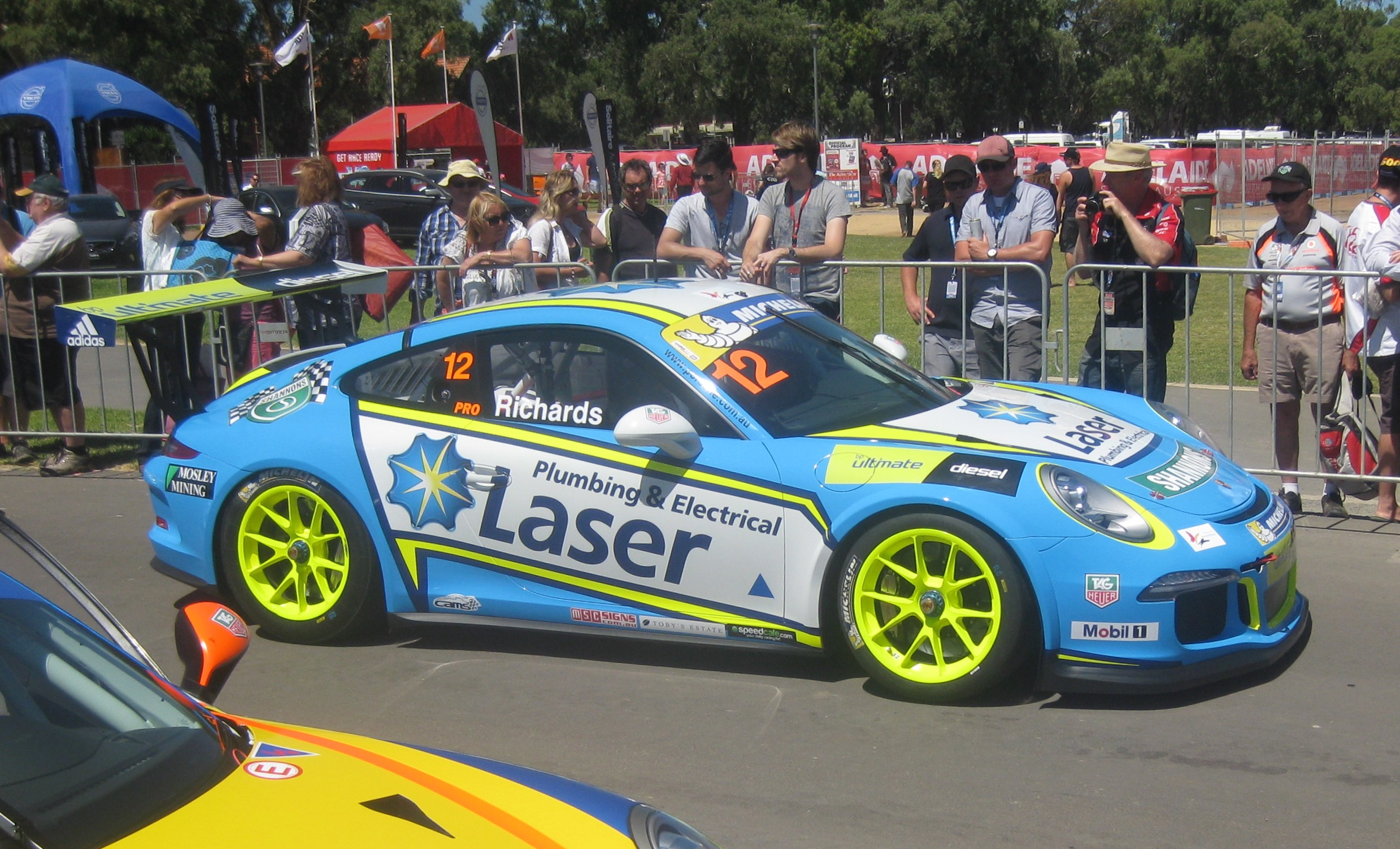
Richards won the 2014 Australian Carrera Cup Championship

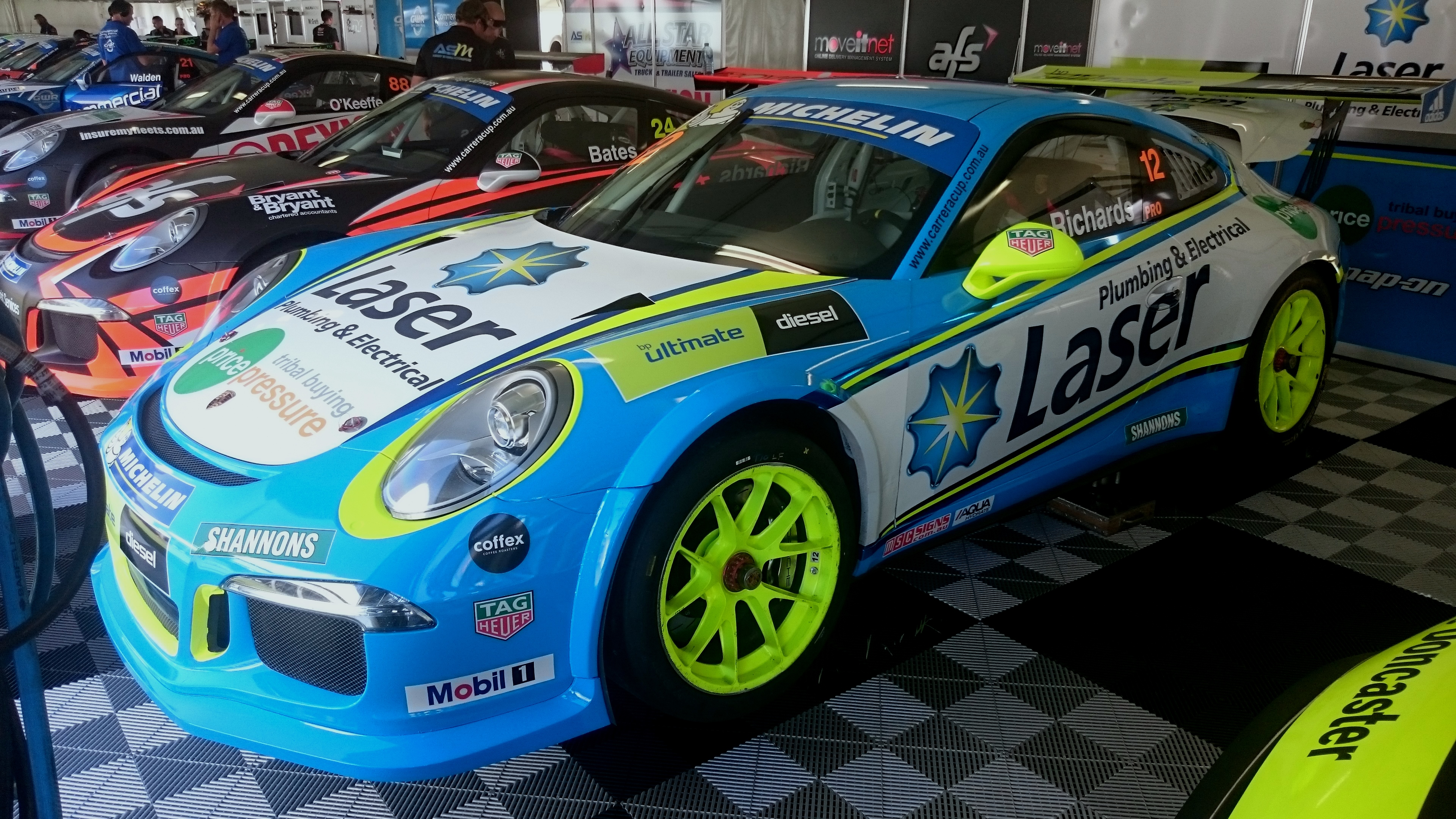
Richards placed fifth in the 2016 Porsche Carrera Cup Australia series

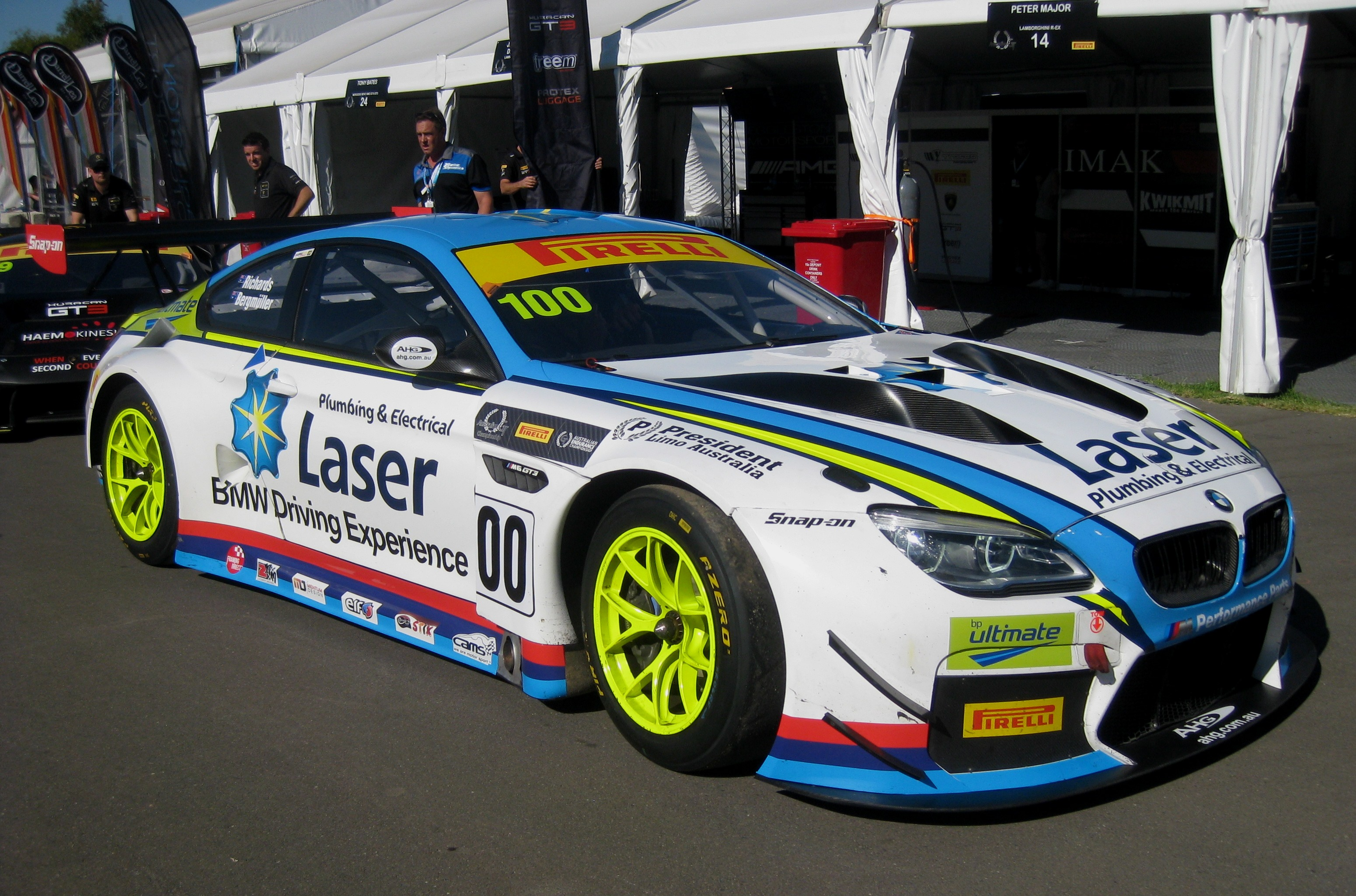
Richards placed 14th in the 2017 Australian GT Championship driving a BMW M6 GT3

Season	Series	Position	Car	Team
1983–84	New Zealand Formula Ford Championship	**1st**	Titan Mk6 Ford	Steven Richards
1992	Motorcraft Formula Ford Driver to Europe Series	7th	Van Diemen RF91 Ford	Steven Richards
1993	Australian Formula Ford Championship	5th	Van Diemen RF93 Ford	Team Valvoline / Garry Rogers
1994	Australian Formula Ford Championship	**1st**	Van Diemen RF94 Ford	Garry Rogers Motorsport
1995	Australian Super Touring Championship	9th	Alfa Romeo 155 TS	Garry Rogers Motorsport
1996	Australian Touring Car Championship	12th	Holden VR Commodore	Garry Rogers Motorsport
1996	Australian Super Touring Championship	5th	Honda Accord; Alfa Romeo 155 TS	Garry Rogers Motorsport
1997	Australian Touring Car Championship	12th	Holden VS Commodore	Garry Rogers Motorsport
1997	Australian Super Touring Championship	7th	Nissan Primera; Honda Accord	Garry Rogers Motorsport
1998	Australian Touring Car Championship	18th	Holden VS Commodore	Garry Rogers Motorsport
1999	Shell Championship Series	7th	Holden VT Commodore	Gibson Motorsport
2000	Shell Championship Series	9th	Holden VT Commodore	Gibson Motorsport
2001	Shell Championship Series	12th	Ford AU Falcon	Ford Tickford Racing
2002	V8 Supercar Championship Series	6th	Holden VX Commodore	Perkins Engineering
2003	V8 Supercar Championship Series	6th	Holden VX Commodore; Holden VY Commodore	Perkins Engineering
2004	V8 Supercar Championship Series	5th	Holden VY Commodore	Perkins Engineering
2005	V8 Supercar Championship Series	7th	Holden VY Commodore	Perkins Engineering
2006	V8 Supercar Championship Series	7th	Holden VZ Commodore	Perkins Engineering
2007	V8 Supercar Championship Series	7th	Ford BF Falcon	Ford Performance Racing
2008	V8 Supercar Championship Series	8th	Ford BF Falcon	Ford Performance Racing
2009	V8 Supercar Championship Series	13th	Ford FG Falcon	Ford Performance Racing
2010	V8 Supercar Championship Series	15th	Ford FG Falcon	Ford Performance Racing
2011	Australian Carrera Cup Championship	4th	Porsche 997 GT3 Cup R	Laser Racing
2011	International V8 Supercars Championship	36th	Ford FG Falcon	Ford Performance Racing
2012	Australian Carrera Cup Championship	5th	Porsche 997 GT3 Cup R	Laser Racing
2012	V8SuperTourer Championship	11th	Ford FG Falcon	John McIntyre Racing
2012	International V8 Supercars Championship	38th	Ford FG Falcon	Ford Performance Racing
2013	Australian Carrera Cup Championship	4th	Porsche 997 GT3 Cup	Laser Racing
2013	Australian GT Championship	33rd	Lamborghini Gallardo LP560	M Motorsport
2013	International V8 Supercars Championship	31st	Ford FG Falcon	Ford Performance Racing
2014	Australian Carrera Cup Championship	**1st**	Porsche 911 GT3 Cup Type 991	Laser Plumbing & Electrical
2014	Australian GT Championship	5th	Lamborghini Gallardo FL2	Interlloy M Motorsport
2014	International V8 Supercars Championship	31st	Holden VF Commodore	Triple Eight Race Engineering
2015	Australian GT Championship	43rd	Chevrolet Camaro	DPM Motorsport
2015	Australian Carrera Cup Championship	4th	Porsche 911 GT3 Cup Type 991	Laser Plumbing & Electrical
2015	International V8 Supercars Championship	31st	Holden VF Commodore	Triple Eight Race Engineering
2016	Porsche Carrera Cup Australia	5th	Porsche 911 GT3 Cup Type 991	Laser Plumbing & Electrical
2016	Australian GT Championship	28th	BMW M6 GT3	Steven Richards Motorsport
2016	Australian Endurance Championship	29th	BMW M6 GT3	Steven Richards Motorsport
2016	International V8 Supercars Championship	31st	Holden VF Commodore	Triple Eight Race Engineering
2017	Virgin Australia Supercars Championship	32nd	Holden VF Commodore	Triple Eight Race Engineering
2017	Australian GT Championship	14th	BMW M6 GT3	BMW Team SRM
2018	Virgin Australia Supercars Championship	27th	Holden ZB Commodore	Triple Eight Race Engineering
2019	Virgin Australia Supercars Championship	37th	Holden ZB Commodore	Team 18

=== Supercars Championship results ===
(Races in bold indicate pole position) (Races in italics indicate fastest lap)

Supercars results
Year	Team	Car	1	2	3	4	5	6	7	8	9	10	11	12	13	14	15	16	17	18	19	20	21	22	23	24	25	26	27	28	29	30	31	32	33	34	35	36	37	38	39	Position	Points
1996	Garry Rogers Motorsport	Holden VR Commodore	EAS; R1; Ret	EAS; R2; Ret	EAS; R3; 14	SAN; R4; 12	SAN; R5; 8	SAN; R6; 6	BAT; R7; 15	BAT; R8; Ret	BAT; R9; 15	SYM; R10; 9	SYM; R11; 11	SYM; R12; Ret	PHI; R13; 7	PHI; R14; 9	PHI; R15; 6	CAL; R16; 11	CAL; R17; 6	CAL; R18; 12	LAK; R19; 14	LAK; R20; 10	LAK; R21; 6	BAR; R22; 9	BAR; R23; 9	BAR; R24; 10	MAL; R25; 9	MAL; R26; 7	MAL; R27; 2	ORA; R28; 8	ORA; R29; 11	ORA; R30; 8										12th	84
1997	Garry Rogers Motorsport	Holden VS Commodore	CAL; R1; 11	CAL; R2; 24	CAL; R3; 13	PHI; R4; Ret	PHI; R5; 10	PHI; R6; 8	SAN; R7; 10	SAN; R8; 9	SAN; R9; 12	SYM; R10	SYM; R11	SYM; R12	WIN; R13; Ret	WIN; R14; 11	WIN; R15; 15	EAS; R16; 13	EAS; R17; 12	EAS; R18; 9	LAK; R19; 9	LAK; R20; Ret	LAK; R21; 9	BAR; R22; Ret	BAR; R23; 7	BAR; R24; 2	MAL; R25; 8	MAL; R26; 6	MAL; R27; 5	ORA; R28; 9	ORA; R29; 7	ORA; R30; 3										12th	263
1998	Garry Rogers Motorsport	Holden VS Commodore	SAN; R1; 4	SAN; R2; 11	SAN; R3; 9	SYM; R4; 17	SYM; R5; 9	SYM; R6; 8	LAK; R7; 14	LAK; R8; 8	LAK; R9; 6	PHI; R10	PHI; R11	PHI; R12	WIN; R13	WIN; R14	WIN; R15	MAL; R16	MAL; R17	MAL; R18	BAR; R19	BAR; R20	BAR; R21	CAL; R22	CAL; R23	CAL; R24	HDV; R25	HDV; R26	HDV; R27	ORA; R28	ORA; R29	ORA; R30										18th	188
1999	Gibson Motorsport	Holden VT Commodore	EAS; R1; 11	EAS; R2; Ret	EAS; R3; 20	ADE; R4; 5	BAR; R5; 11	BAR; R6; 7	BAR; R7; 5	PHI; R8; 7	PHI; R9; 8	PHI; R10; 4	HDV; R11; 17	HDV; R12; Ret	HDV; R13; Ret	SAN; R14; 8	SAN; R15; Ret	SAN; R16; 19	QLD; R17; 17	QLD; R18; 9	QLD; R19; Ret	CAL; R20; 8	CAL; R21; Wth	CAL; R22; Wth	SYM; R23; 11	SYM; R24; 8	SYM; R25; Wth	WIN; R26; 14	WIN; R27; 9	WIN; R28; 15	ORA; R29; Ret	ORA; R30; 14	ORA; R31; 10	QLD; R32; 6	BAT; R33; 1							7th	1310
2000	Gibson Motorsport	Holden VT Commodore	PHI; R1; 11	PHI; R2; 10	BAR; R3; 14	BAR; R4; Ret	BAR; R5; 15	ADE; R6; 4	ADE; R7; 17	EAS; R8; 14	EAS; R9; 10	EAS; R10; 8	HDV; R11; Ret	HDV; R12; Ret	HDV; R13; 22	CAN; R14; 3	CAN; R15; 4	CAN; R16; 5	QLD; R17; 24	QLD; R18; 10	QLD; R19; 13	WIN; R20; 20	WIN; R21; 10	WIN; R22; Ret	ORA; R23; 7	ORA; R24; Ret	ORA; R25; 17	CAL; R26; 4	CAL; R27; 2	CAL; R28; 1	QLD; R29; 3	SAN; R30; 12	SAN; R31; Ret	SAN; R32; 17	BAT; R33; 3							8th	993
2001	Glenn Seton Racing	Ford AU Falcon	PHI; R1; 6	PHI; R2; 5	ADE; R3; 16	ADE; R4; 7	EAS; R5; 14	EAS; R6; 31	HDV; R7; 9	HDV; R8; 6	HDV; R9; 4	CAN; R10; 26	CAN; R11; 1	CAN; R12; 10	BAR; R13; 14	BAR; R14; 9	BAR; R15; 9	CAL; R16; 9	CAL; R17; 7	CAL; R18; 10	ORA; R19; 19	ORA; R20; 12	QLD; R21; Ret	WIN; R22; 20	WIN; R23; 11	BAT; R24; 9	PUK; R25; Ret	PUK; R26; 25	PUK; R27; 20	SAN; R28; 15	SAN; R29; 8	SAN; R30; Ret										12th	1912
2002	Perkins Engineering	Holden VX Commodore	ADE; R1; 5	ADE; R2; 3	PHI; R3; Ret	PHI; R4; 20	EAS; R5; 10	EAS; R6; 11	EAS; R7; 12	HDV; R8; 7	HDV; R9; 6	HDV; R10; 4	CAN; R11; 2	CAN; R12; 9	CAN; R13; 8	BAR; R14; 8	BAR; R15; 17	BAR; R16; 23	ORA; R17; 3	ORA; R18; 4	WIN; R19; 12	WIN; R20; 7	QLD; R21; 2	BAT; R22; 2	SUR; R23; 4	SUR; R24; 7	PUK; R25; 6	PUK; R26; 6	PUK; R27; 18	SAN; R28; 6	SAN; R29; Ret											6th	1310
2003	Perkins Engineering	Holden VY Commodore	ADE; R1; 4	ADE; R1; 2	PHI; R3; 7	EAS; R4; 8	WIN; R5; 3	BAR; R6; 4	BAR; R7; 3	BAR; R8; 8	HDV; R9; 9	HDV; R10; 6	HDV; R11; 5	QLD; R12; Ret	ORA; R13; 23	SAN; R14; 6	BAT; R15; 4	SUR; R16; Ret	SUR; R17; 22	PUK; R18; 20	PUK; R19; 6	PUK; R20; 6	EAS; R21; 4	EAS; R22; 16																		6th	1709
2004	Perkins Engineering	Holden VY Commodore	ADE; R1; 2	ADE; R2; 2	EAS; R3; 4	PUK; R4; 6	PUK; R5; 5	PUK; R6; 4	HDV; R7; 5	HDV; R8; 3	HDV; R9; 3	**BAR**; **R10**; **Ret**	BAR; R11; 6	BAR; R12; 2	QLD; R13; 2	WIN; R14; 13	ORA; R15; 10	ORA; R16; 11	SAN; R17; 15	**BAT**; **R18**; **21**	SUR; R19; Ret	SUR; R20; Ret	SYM; R21; 4	SYM; R22; 13	SYM; R23; 6	EAS; R24; 8	EAS; R25; 4	EAS; R26; 8														5th	1819
2005	Perkins Engineering	Holden VY Commodore	ADE; R1; 5	ADE; R2; 26	PUK; R3; 28	PUK; R4; 8	PUK; R5; 3	BAR; R6; 3	BAR; R7; 1	**BAR**; **R8**; **2**	EAS; R9; 3	EAS; R10; 5	SHA; R11; 2	SHA; R12; 2	SHA; R13; 2	HDV; R14; 22	HDV; R15; 12	HDV; R16; 4	QLD; R17; 5	ORA; R18; 1	**ORA**; **R19**; **11**	SAN; R20; 13	BAT; R21; Ret	SUR; R22; 27	SUR; R23; 28	SUR; R24; 18	**SYM**; **R25**; **2**	SYM; R26; 2	SYM; R27; 4	PHI; R28; 27	PHI; R29; 12	PHI; R30; 26										7th	1669
2006	Perkins Engineering	Holden VZ Commodore	ADE; R1; 7	ADE; R2; 5	PUK; R3; 7	PUK; R4; Ret	PUK; R5; 6	BAR; R6; 2	BAR; R7; 2	BAR; R8; 7	WIN; R9; 7	WIN; R10; 23	WIN; R11; 10	HDV; R12; 7	HDV; R13; 22	HDV; R14; 28	QLD; R15; 6	QLD; R16; 14	QLD; R17; 6	ORA; R18; 8	ORA; R19; 11	ORA; R20; Ret	SAN; R21; 28	BAT; R22; 5	SUR; R23; 5	SUR; R24; Ret	SUR; R25; 10	SYM; R26; 6	SYM; R27; 11	SYM; R28; 6	BHR; R29; 6	BHR; R30; 8	BHR; R31; 11	PHI; R32; 8	PHI; R33; 5	PHI; R34; 8						7th	2740
2007	Ford Performance Racing	Ford BF Falcon	ADE; R1; 11	ADE; R2; 8	BAR; R3; 22	BAR; R4; 13	BAR; R5; 9	PUK; R6; 5	PUK; R7; 18	PUK; R8; 12	WIN; R9; 2	WIN; R10; 16	WIN; R11; 12	EAS; R12; 6	EAS; R13; 6	EAS; R14; 7	HDV; R15; 7	HDV; R16; 9	HDV; R17; 8	QLD; R18; 13	QLD; R19; Ret	QLD; R20; Ret	ORA; R21; 5	ORA; R22; 6	ORA; R23; 5	SAN; R24; 3	**BAT**; **R25**; **10**	SUR; R26; Ret	SUR; R27; 5	SUR; R28; 1	BHR; R29; 25	BHR; R30; 6	BHR; R31; 25	SYM; R32; 4	SYM; R33; 2	SYM; R34; 2	PHI; R35; 27	PHI; R36; 12	PHI; R37; 9			7th	380
2008	Ford Performance Racing	Ford BF Falcon	ADE; R1; 5	ADE; R2; 15	EAS; R3; 27	EAS; R4; 7	EAS; R5; Ret	**HAM**; **R6**; **3**	HAM; R7; 2	HAM; R8; 2	BAR; R9; 4	BAR; R10; 7	BAR; R11; 9	SAN; R12; 23	SAN; R13; 16	SAN; R14; 9	HDV; R15; 2	HDV; R16; 2	HDV; R17; 1	QLD; R18; 7	QLD; R19; 7	QLD; R20; 11	WIN; R21; 5	WIN; R22; 24	WIN; R23; Ret	PHI; Q 9	PHI; R24; 4	BAT; R25; 4	SUR; R26; 11	SUR; R27; 12	SUR; R28; 8	BHR; R29; 8	BHR; R30; 5	BHR; R31; 9	SYM; R32; Ret	SYM; R33; Ret	SYM; R34; 17	ORA; R35; 4	ORA; R36; 3	ORA; R37; 17		8th	2416
2009	Ford Performance Racing	Ford FG Falcon	ADE; R1; Ret	ADE; R2; 9	HAM; R3; 15	HAM; R4; 12	WIN; R5; 3	WIN; R6; 16	SYM; R7; 15	SYM; R8; 15	HDV; R9; 21	HDV; R10; 14	TOW; R11; 21	TOW; R12; 20	SAN; R13; 14	SAN; R14; 12	QLD; R15; 11	QLD; R16; 7	PHI; Q 1	**PHI**; **R17**; **3**	BAT; R18; Ret	SUR; R19; 7	SUR; R20; 6	SUR; R21; 12	SUR; R22; Ret	PHI; R23; 17	PHI; R24; 14	BAR; R25; 23	BAR; R26; 8	SYD; R27; 8	SYD; R28; 15											13th	1780
2010	Ford Performance Racing	Ford FG Falcon	YMC; R1; 16	YMC; R2; 17	BHR; R3; Ret	BHR; R4; 15	ADE; R5; 17	ADE; R6; 13	HAM; R7; 24	HAM; R8; DSQ	QLD; R9; 27	QLD; R10; 9	WIN; R11; 14	WIN; R12; 21	HDV; R13; Ret	HDV; R14; 10	TOW; R15; 9	TOW; R16; 5	PHI; R17; 21	BAT; R18; 11	SUR; R19; Ret	SUR; R20; 13	SYM; R21; 8	SYM; R22; 9	SAN; R23; 12	SAN; R24; 15	SYD; R25; 11	SYD; R26; 2														15th	1630
2011	Ford Performance Racing	Ford FG Falcon	YMC; R1	YMC; R2	ADE; R3	ADE; R4	HAM; R5	HAM; R6	BAR; R7	BAR; R8	BAR; R9	WIN; R10	WIN; R11	HID; R12	HID; R13	TOW; R14	TOW; R15	QLD; R16	QLD; R17	QLD; R18	PHI; R19; 17	BAT; R20; 4	SUR; R21	SUR; R22	SYM; R23	SYM; R24	SAN; R25	SAN; R26	SYD; R27	SYD; R28												36th	366
2012	Ford Performance Racing	Ford FG Falcon	ADE; R1	ADE; R2	SYM; R3	SYM; R4	HAM; R5	HAM; R6	BAR; R7	BAR; R8	BAR; R9	PHI; R10	PHI; R11	HID; R12	HID; R13	TOW; R14	TOW; R15	QLD; R16	QLD; R17	SMP; R18	SMP; R19	SAN; QR; EX	SAN; R20; 2	BAT; R21; 11	SUR; R22	SUR; R23	YMC; R24	YMC; R25	YMC; R26	WIN; R27	WIN; R28	SYD; R29	SYD; R30									38th	347
2013	Ford Performance Racing	Ford FG Falcon	ADE; R1	ADE; R2	SYM; R3	SYM; R4	SYM; R5	PUK; R6	PUK; R7	PUK; R8	PUK; R9	BAR; R10	BAR; R11	BAR; R12	COA; R13	COA; R14	COA; R15	COA; R16	HID; R17	HID; R18	HID; R19	TOW; R20	TOW; R21	QLD; R22	QLD; R23	QLD; R24	WIN; R25	WIN; R26	WIN; R27	SAN; R28; 6	BAT; R29; 1	SUR; R30; 3	SUR; R31; 18	PHI; R32	PHI; R33	PHI; R34	SYD; R35	SYD; R36				31st	684
2014	Triple Eight Race Engineering	Holden VF Commodore	ADE; R1	ADE; R2	ADE; R3	SYM; R4	SYM; R5	SYM; R6	WIN; R7	WIN; R8	WIN; R9	PUK; R10	PUK; R11	PUK; R12	PUK; R13	BAR; R14	BAR; R15	BAR; R16	HID; R17	HID; R18	HID; R19	TOW; R20	TOW; R21	TOW; R22	QLD; R23	QLD; R24	QLD; R25	SMP; R26	SMP; R27	SMP; R28	SAN; QR; 9	SAN; R29; 4	BAT; R30; 10	SUR; R31; 17	SUR; R32; 11	PHI; R33	PHI; R34	PHI; R35	SYD; R36	SYD; R37	SYD; R38	31st	522
2015	Triple Eight Race Engineering	Holden VF Commodore	ADE; R1	ADE; R2	ADE; R3	SYM; R4	SYM; R5	SYM; R6	BAR; R7	BAR; R8	BAR; R9	WIN; R10	WIN; R11	WIN; R12	HID; R13	HID; R14	HID; R15	TOW; R16	TOW; R17	QLD; R18	QLD; R19	QLD; R20	SMP; R21	SMP; R22	SMP; R23	SAN; QR; 12	SAN; R24; 13	BAT; R25; 1	SUR; R26; 3	SUR; R27; 4	PUK; R28	PUK; R29	PUK; R30	PHI; R31	PHI; R32	PHI; R33	SYD; R34	SYD; R35	SYD; R36			31st	681
2016	Triple Eight Race Engineering	Holden VF Commodore	ADE; R1	ADE; R2	ADE; R3	SYM; R4	SYM; R5	PHI; R6	PHI; R7	BAR; R8	BAR; R9	WIN; R10	WIN; R11	HID; R12	HID; R13	TOW; R14	TOW; R15	QLD; R16	QLD; R17	SMP; R18	SMP; R19	SAN; QR; 16	SAN; R20; 8	BAT; R21; 16	SUR; R22; 6	SUR; R23; 4	PUK; R24	PUK; R25	PUK; R26	PUK; R27	SYD; R28	SYD; R29										31st	516
2017	Triple Eight Race Engineering	Holden VF Commodore	ADE; R1	ADE; R2	SYM; R3	SYM; R4	PHI; R5	PHI; R6	BAR; R7	BAR; R8	WIN; R9	WIN; R10	HID; R11	HID; R12	TOW; R13	TOW; R14	QLD; R15	QLD; R16	SMP; R17	SMP; R18	SAN; R19; 11	BAT; R20; 11	SUR; R21; 7	SUR; R22; 4	PUK; R23	PUK; R24	NEW; R25	NEW; R26														32nd	504
2018	Triple Eight Race Engineering	Holden ZB Commodore	ADE; R1	ADE; R2	MEL; R3	MEL; R4	MEL; R5	MEL; R6	SYM; R7	SYM; R8	PHI; R9	PHI; R10	BAR; R11	BAR; R12	WIN; R13	WIN; R14	HID; R15	HID; R16	TOW; R17	TOW; R18	QLD; R19	QLD; R20	SMP; R21	BEN; R22	BEN; R23	SAN; R24; 3	BAT; R25; 1	SUR; R26; 2	SUR; R27; C	PUK; R28	PUK; R29	NEW; R30	NEW; R31									27th	696
2019	Team 18	Holden ZB Commodore	ADE; R1	ADE; R2	MEL; R3	MEL; R4	MEL; R5	MEL; R6	SYM; R7	SYM; R8	PHI; R9	PHI; R10	BAR; R11	BAR; R12	WIN; R13	WIN; R14	HID; R15	HID; R16	TOW; R17	TOW; R18	QLD; R19	QLD; R20	BEN; R21	BEN; R22	PUK; R23	PUK; R24	BAT; R25; 6	SUR; R26; 19	SUR; R27; 19	SAN; QR; 12	SAN; R28; 12	NEW; R29	NEW; R30									37th	438

=== Complete Bathurst 1000 results ===
Year	No.	Team	Car	Co-driver	Position	Laps
1995	2	Gibson Motorsport	Holden Commodore VR	(Sweden) Anders Olofsson	4th	161
1996	32	Garry Rogers Motorsport	Holden Commodore VR	(New Zealand) Jim Richards	DNF	33
1997*	34	Garry Rogers Motorsport	Nissan Primera	(United Kingdom) Matt Neal	DNF	84
1997	34	Garry Rogers Motorsport	Holden Commodore VS	(New Zealand) Jim Richards	**2nd**	161
1998*	34	Team Dynamics	Nissan Primera	(United Kingdom) Matt Neal	**2nd**	161
1998	4	Stone Brothers Racing	Ford Falcon EL	(Australia) Jason Bright	**1st**	161
1999	7	Gibson Motorsport	Holden Commodore VT	(New Zealand) Greg Murphy	**1st**	161
2000	7	Gibson Motorsport	Holden Commodore VT	(New Zealand) Greg Murphy	**3rd**	161
2001	5	Ford Tickford Racing	Ford Falcon AU	(Australia) Glenn Seton	9th	161
2002	16	Perkins Engineering	Holden Commodore VX	(Australia) Russell Ingall	**2nd**	161
2003	11	Perkins Engineering	Holden Commodore VY	(Australia) Larry Perkins	4th	161
2004	11	Perkins Engineering	Holden Commodore VY	(New Zealand) Jim Richards	21st	148
2005	24	Perkins Engineering	Holden Commodore VZ	(Australia) Paul Dumbrell	DNF	28
2006	7	Perkins Engineering	Holden Commodore VZ	(Australia) Paul Dumbrell	5th	161
2007	6	Ford Performance Racing	Ford Falcon BF	(Australia) Mark Winterbottom	10th	161
2008	6	Ford Performance Racing	Ford Falcon BF	(Australia) Mark Winterbottom	4th	161
2009	6	Ford Performance Racing	Ford Falcon FG	(Australia) Mark Winterbottom	DNF	49
2010	6	Ford Performance Racing	Ford Falcon FG	(Australia) James Moffat	11th	161
2011	5	Ford Performance Racing	Ford Falcon FG	(Australia) Mark Winterbottom	4th	161
2012	5	Ford Performance Racing	Ford Falcon FG	(Australia) Mark Winterbottom	11th	161
2013	5	Ford Performance Racing	Ford Falcon FG	(Australia) Mark Winterbottom	**1st**	161
2014	888	Triple Eight Race Engineering	Holden Commodore VF	(Australia) Craig Lowndes	10th	161
2015	888	Triple Eight Race Engineering	Holden Commodore VF	(Australia) Craig Lowndes	**1st**	161
2016	888	Triple Eight Race Engineering	Holden Commodore VF	(Australia) Craig Lowndes	16th	156
2017	888	Triple Eight Race Engineering	Holden Commodore VF	(Australia) Craig Lowndes	11th	160
2018	888	Triple Eight Race Engineering	Holden Commodore ZB	(Australia) Craig Lowndes	**1st**	161
2019	18	Team 18	Holden Commodore ZB	(Australia) Mark Winterbottom	6th	161

* Super Touring race

=== Complete Australian Carrera Cup Championship results ===
(key) (Races in bold indicate pole position – 1 point awarded all races) (Races in italics indicate fastest lap) (* signifies that driver lead feature race for at least one lap – 1 point awarded)

Year	Team	Car	1	2	3	4	5	6	7	8	9	10	11	12	13	14	15	16	17	18	19	20	21	22	23	24	Pos	Pts
2011	Jim Richards Racing	Porsche 911 GT3 Cup	ALB; R1; 3	ALB; R2; 3	ALB; R3; 3	BAR; R4; 1	BAR; R5; 3	BAR; R6; 2	TOW; R7; 6	TOW; R8; 9	TOW; R9; 5	PHI; R10; 5	PHI; R11; 4	PHI; R12; 4	BAT; R13; 2	BAT; R14; 3	BAT; R15; 3	SUR; R16; 7	SUR; R17; 4	SUR; R18; 2	HOM; R19; Ret	HOM; R20; 4	HOM; R21; 3				4th	882
2012	Laser Racing	Porsche 911 GT3 Cup	ADE; R1; Ret	ADE; R2; Ret	ADE; R3; 4	ALB; R4; 11	ALB; R5; 6	ALB; R6; 4	BAR; R7; 6	BAR; R8; 4	BAR; R9; 6	TOW; R10; 2	TOW; R11; 3	TOW; R12; 11	PHI; R13; 5	PHI; R14; 5	PHI; R15; 4	BAT; R16; 3	BAT; R17; 5	BAT; R18; 5	SUR; R19; 3	SUR; R20; 3	SUR; R21; 2	HOM; R22; 3	HOM; R23; 4	HOM; R24; 6	5th	884
2013	Steve Richards Motorsport	Porsche 911 GT3 Cup	ADE; R1; 3	ADE; R2; 2	ADE; R3; 1	ALB; R4; 1	ALB; R5; 6	ALB; R6; 5	SYD; R7; 6	SYD; R8; 13	TOW; R9; 5	TOW; R10; 5	TOW; R11; 3	WIN; R12; 9	WIN; R13; 4	WIN; R14; 7	BAT; R15; 4	BAT; R16; 5	BAT; R17; 3	SUR; R18; 2	SUR; R19; 2	SUR; R20; 1					4th	879
2014	Steve Richards Motorsport	Porsche 911 GT3 Cup	ADE; R1; 4	ADE; R2; 2	ADE; R3; 2	ALB; R4; 1	ALB; R5; 2	ALB; R6; 2	PHI; R7; 14	PHI; R8; 5	TOW; R9; 3	TOW; R10; 1	TOW; R11; 1	SMP; R12; 3	SMP; R13; 2	SMP; R14; 3	SAN; R15; 2	SAN; R16; 21	SAN; R17; C	BAT; R18; 1	BAT; R19; 4	BAT; R20; 21	SUR; R21; 2	SUR; R22; 2	SUR; R23; 5		1st	954
2015	Steve Richards Motorsport	Porsche 911 GT3 Cup	ADE; R1; 1	ADE; R2; 1	ADE; R3; 1	ALB; R4; 2	ALB; R5; 1	ALB; R6; 1	PHI; R7; 7	PHI; R8; 10	TOW; R9; 6	TOW; R10; 3	TOW; R11; 2	SMP; R12; 3	SMP; R13; Ret	SMP; R14; 8	SAN; R15; Ret	SAN; R16; 7	SAN; R17; 4	BAT; R18; 4	BAT; R19; 3	SUR; R20; 12	SUR; R21; 12	SUR; R22; 11			4th	846.5
2016	Steve Richards Motorsport	Porsche 911 GT3 Cup	ADE; R1; 8	ADE; R2; 4	ADE; R3; Ret	ALB; R4; 8	ALB; R5; 2	ALB; R6; 2	ALB; R7; 2	SMP; R8; 12	SMP; R9; 12	HID; R10; 5	HID; R11; 4	HID; R12; 3	SMP; R13; 5	SMP; R14; 7	SAN; R15; 5	SAN; R16; 4	SAN; R17; 2	BAT; R18; 3	BAT; R19; 2	BAT; R20; 2	SUR; R21; 4	SUR; R22; 4	SUR; R23; 5		5th	898.5
2019	Sonic Motor Racing Services	Porsche 911 GT3 Cup	ADE; R1	ADE; R2	ADE; R3	MEL; R4; 24	MEL; R5; 14	MEL; R6; 12	PHI; R8; 11	PHI; R9; 10	PHI; R10; 8	HID; R11; 7	HID; R12; 7	HID; R13; 8	TOW; R14; 15	TOW; R15; 21	TOW; R16; 10	BEN; R17; 8	BEN; R18; 21	BEN; R19; 10	BAT; R20; 16	BAT; R21; 6	BAT; R22; 6	SUR; R23; 8	SUR; R24; 12	SUR; R25; 10	11th	364

=== Complete Bathurst 24 Hour results ===
Year	Team	Co-drivers	Car	Class	Laps	Overall position	Class position
2002	(Australia) Garry Rogers Motorsport	(Australia) Garth Tander (Australia) Nathan Pretty (Australia) Cameron McConville	Holden Monaro 427C	1	532	**1st**	**1st**
2003	(Australia) Garry Rogers Motorsport	(Australia) Garth Tander (Australia) Nathan Pretty (Australia) Cameron McConville	Holden Monaro 427C	A	527	**2nd**	**2nd**

=== Complete Bathurst 12 Hour results ===
Year	Team	Co-drivers	Car	Class	Laps	Overall position	Class position
1993	(Australia) Garry Rogers Motorsport	(Australia) Paul Fordham	Nissan Pulsar SSS	B	234	21st	**3rd**
2012	(Australia) Hunter Sports Group	(Australia) Steven Johnson (Australia) Nathan Tinkler	Porsche 997 GT3 Cup	B	254	4th	**1st**
2013	(Australia) GB Galvanising	(Australia) Ross Lilley (Australia) Justin McMillan	Lamborghini Gallardo LP560	A	247	13th	10th
2014	(Australia) M Motorsport	(Australia) Ross Lilley (Australia) Justin McMillan (Australia) Dale Wood	Lamborghini Gallardo LP560-4	A	78	DNF	DNF
2015	(Australia) M Motorsport	(New Zealand) Craig Baird (Australia) Justin McMillan	Lamborghini Gallardo LP560-4	AP	129	DNF	DNF
2017	(Australia) BMW Team SRM	(Germany) Marco Wittmann (Australia) Mark Winterbottom	BMW M6 GT3	AP	281	14th	7th
2018	(Australia) BMW Team SRM	(Germany) Timo Glock (Austria) Philipp Eng	BMW M6 GT3	AP	270	9th	5th

=== Complete Bathurst Showroom Showdown results ===
Year	Team	Co-drivers	Car	Class	Laps	Pos.	Class pos.
1999	(Australia) Gibson Motorsport	(New Zealand) Greg Murphy	Holden Vectra GL 2.2	D	56	21st	**1st**
2000	(Australia) Gibson Motorsport	(New Zealand) Greg Murphy	Holden Vectra GL 2.2	E	51	27th	**1st**

Sporting positions
Preceded by Larry Perkins; Russell Ingall	Winner of the Bathurst Classic; 1998 (with Jason Bright)	Succeeded by Steven Richards; Greg Murphy
Preceded by Rickard Rydell; Jim Richards	Winner of the Bathurst 1000; 1999 (with Greg Murphy)	Succeeded by Garth Tander; Jason Bargwanna
Preceded by Jamie Whincup; Paul Dumbrell	Winner of the Bathurst 1000; 2013 (with Mark Winterbottom)	Succeeded by Chaz Mostert; Paul Morris
Preceded by Craig Baird	Winner of the Australian Carrera Cup Championship; 2014	Succeeded by Nick Foster
Preceded by Chaz Mostert; Paul Morris	Winner of the Bathurst 1000; 2015 (with Craig Lowndes)	Succeeded by Will Davison; Jonathon Webb
Preceded by David Reynolds; Luke Youlden	Winner of the Bathurst 1000; 2018 (with Craig Lowndes)	Succeeded by Scott McLaughlin; Alexandre Prémat
Preceded by Chaz Mostert; Steve Owen	Winner of the Enduro Cup; 2018 (with Craig Lowndes)	Succeeded by Jamie Whincup; Craig Lowndes
