= 2013 Australian Carrera Cup Championship =

Australian motor racing competition

Seasons
- ← 2012 2014 →

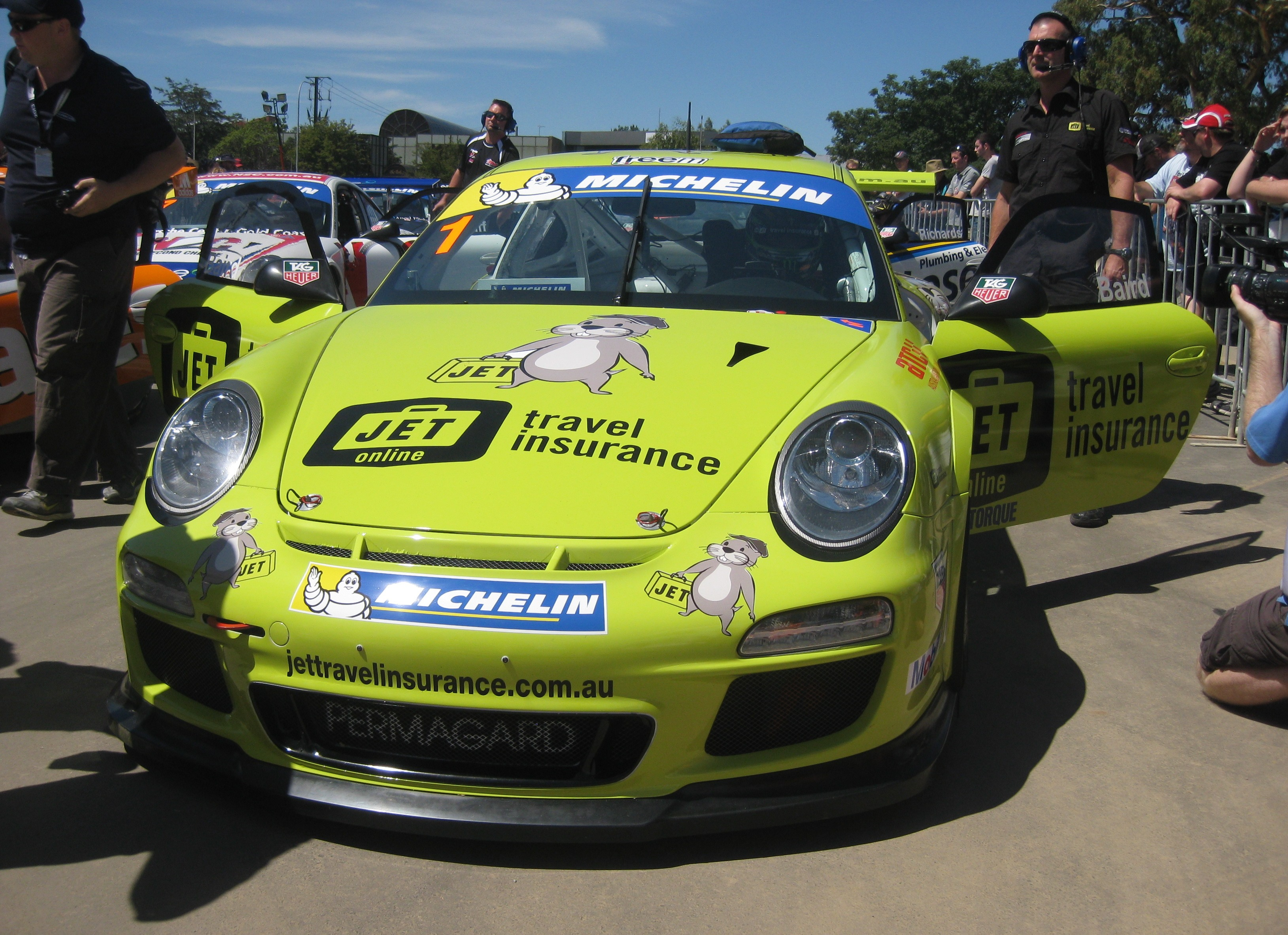
Reigning champion Craig Baird successfully defended his title, and won his fifth Australian Carrera Cup Championship

The 2013 Australian Carrera Cup Championship was a CAMS sanctioned Australian motor racing title open to Porsche 911 GT3 Cup cars. The title, which was the ninth Australian Carrera Cup Championship, was won by Craig Baird.

== Teams and drivers ==
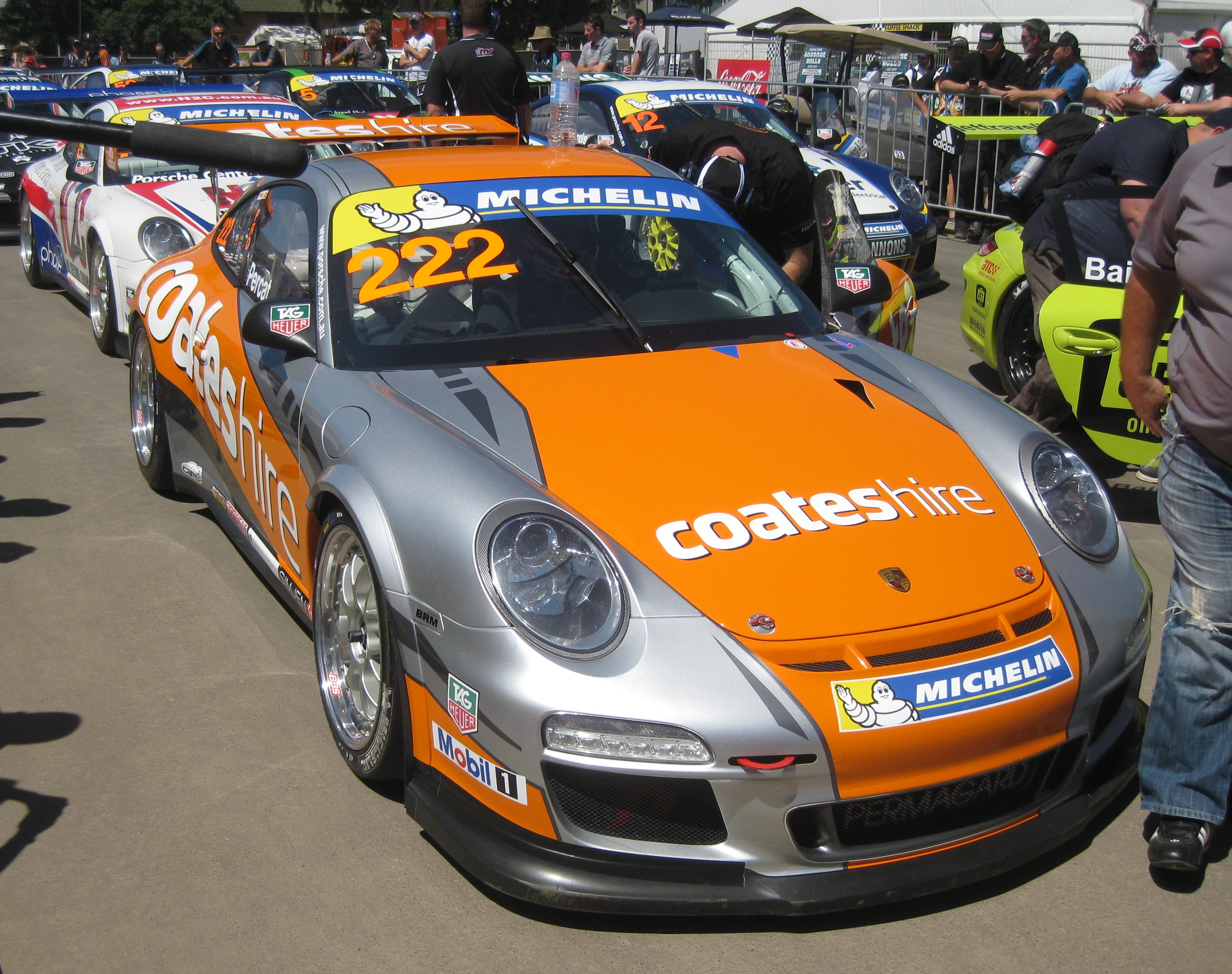
Nick Percat placed second in the championship

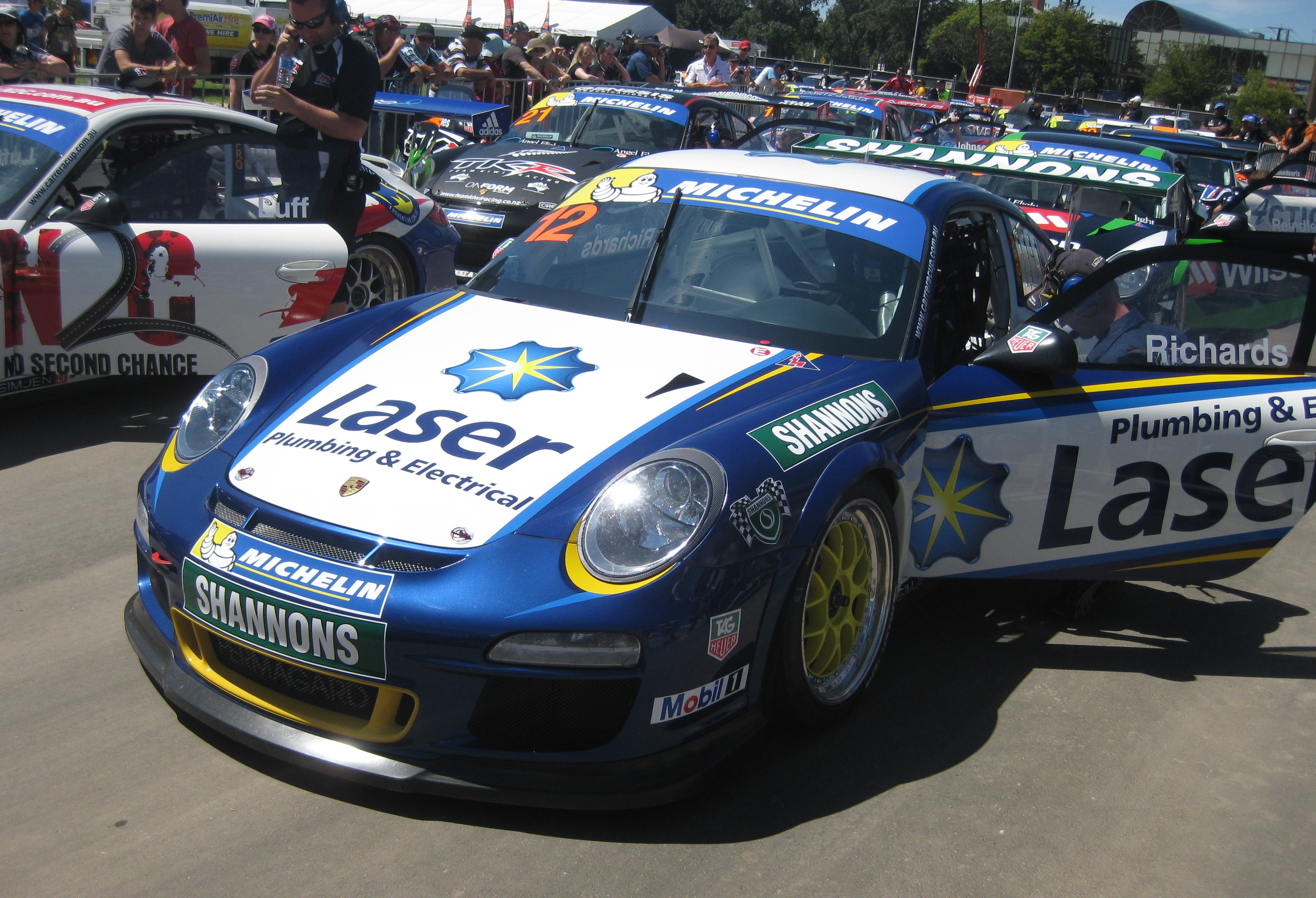
Steven Richards placed fourth in the championship

Team	No.	Driver	Co-driver	Class	Rounds
Alliance Group Racing	1	(New Zealand) Craig Baird	(New Zealand) John Penny	Pro	All
Grove Group	4	(Australia) Stephen Grove	(New Zealand) Earl Bamber	Elite	All
Team BRM	5	(Australia) Karl Reindler		Pro	1–2
Team BRM	20	(Australia) Duvashen Padayachee	(Australia) Jeff Bobik	Pro	All
Team BRM	222	(Australia) Nick Percat	(Australia) Rodney Jane	Pro	All
Objective Racing	5	(Australia) Tony Walls		Elite	4–7
Objective Racing	6	(Australia) Tony Walls	(Australia) James Davison	Elite	1–3
Skye Sands	6	(Australia) Rusty French		Elite	5–6
McElrea Racing	7	(Australia) Warren Luff	(Australia) Geoff Emery	Pro	All
McElrea Racing	24	(Australia) Tony Bates	(Australia) Alex Davison	Elite	All
McElrea Racing	29	(Australia) Michael Patrizi	(Australia) Troy Bayliss	Pro	All
McElrea Racing	55	(Australia) Renee Gracie	(Australia) Peter Hill	Pro	All
Twigg Motorsport	8	(Australia) Max Twigg	(Australia) Luke Youlden	Elite	All
Hallmarc	9	(Australia) Marc Cini	(Australia) Tim Slade	Elite	All
Hallmarc	10	(Australia) Michael Loccisano	(New Zealand) Jonny Reid	Elite	All
Steve Richards Motorsport	12	(New Zealand) Steven Richards	(Australia) Theo Koundouris	Pro	All
Steve Richards Motorsport	13	(Australia) James Burgmuller	(Australia) Dale Wood	Elite	All
Steve Richards Motorsport	34	(Australia) Richard Muscat	(Australia) Simon Middleton	Pro	3, 5
Porsche Cars Australia	16	(Australia) Gavin Bullas		Elite	6
Porsche Cars Australia	88	(Australia) Andrew Jones	(Australia) Xavier West	Pro	3
Porsche Cars Australia	88	(Australia) Shae Davies		Pro	4–7
Hunter Sports Group	17	(Australia) Steven Johnson		Pro	1–2
Nexus Racing	19	(Australia) Damien Flack	(Australia) David Wall	Elite	All
Team Kiwi Racing	21	(Australia) Shae Davies	(Australia) Adam Gowans	Pro	1–3
Team Kiwi Racing	21	(Australia) Adam Gowans		Elite	5–6
Supabarn Supermarkets	47	(Australia) James Koundouris	(Australia) Steve Owen	Elite	1–4
Action Tyres	50	(Australia) Matthew Kingsley	(Australia) John Goodacre	Pro	1–3
Hamilton Autohaus	56	(Australia) Shane Smollen	(Australia) David Russell	Elite	All
Eggleston Motorsport	77	(Australia) Martin Wagg		Elite	4–5
Paul Kelly Motor Group	90	(New Zealand) Paul Kelly		Elite	2, 4–7

== Race calendar ==
The championship was contested over a seven-round series.

Round	Circuit	City / state	Date	Format	Winning driver(s)
1	(South Australia) Adelaide Street Circuit	Adelaide, South Australia	28 February—3 March	Three races	Craig Baird
2	(Victoria (state)) Albert Park Grand Prix Circuit	Melbourne, Victoria	14—17 March	Three races	Craig Baird
3	(New South Wales) Sydney Motorsport Park	Eastern Creek, New South Wales	25—26 May	Two races	Max Twigg/Luke Youlden
4	(Queensland) Townsville Street Circuit	Townsville, Queensland	5—7 July	Three races	Craig Baird
5	(Victoria (state)) Winton Motor Raceway	Benalla, Victoria	23—25 August	Three races	Michael Patrizi
6	(New South Wales) Mount Panorama Circuit	Bathurst, New South Wales	10—13 October	Three races	Warren Luff
7	(Queensland) Surfers Paradise Street Circuit	Surfers Paradise, Queensland	25—27 October	Three races	Nick Percat

== Points system ==
Championship points were awarded to the first 25 finishers in each race as per the following table.

Position	1st	2nd	3rd	4th	5th	6th	7th	8th	9th	10th	11th	12th	13th	14th	15th	16th	17th	18th	19th	20th	21st	22nd	23rd	24th	25th
Points	60	54	48	42	36	32	29	26	23	20	18	16	14	12	11	10	9	8	7	6	5	4	3	2	1

In addition to contesting the outright championship, each driver was classified as either Professional or Elite and competed for the relevant class title. Points were awarded for class places in each race on the same basis as for the outright championship.

The results for each round were determined by the number of championship points scored by each driver at that round, with both the Professional and Elite class having round winners.

The driver gaining the highest points total over all rounds was declared the winner of the championship.

== Championship standings ==
=== Overall ===
Pos.	Driver	No.	ADE (South Australia)			MEL (Victoria (state))			SYD (New South Wales)		TOW (Queensland)			WIN (Victoria (state))			BAT (New South Wales)			SUR (Queensland)			Pen.	Pts.
1	(New Zealand) Craig Baird	1	1st	1st	3rd	2nd	1st	1st	7th	6th	1st	1st	1st	15th	6th	2nd	3rd	2nd	1st	6th	6th	5th		972.5
2	(Australia) Nick Percat	222	2nd	3rd	2nd	3rd	2nd	Ret	1st	8th	2nd	2nd	Ret	8th	3rd	1st	1st	3rd	8th	1st	1st	2nd		937
3	(Australia) Warren Luff	7	4th	4th	8th	4th	3rd	2nd	4th	3rd	3rd	3rd	2nd	20th	10th	5th	2nd	1st	2nd	5th	5th	4th		883
4	(New Zealand) Steven Richards	12	3rd	2nd	1st	1st	6th	5th	6th	13th	5th	5th	3rd	9th	4th	7th	4th	5th	3rd	2nd	2nd	1st		879
5	(Australia) Michael Patrizi	29	13th	7th	4th	5th	5th	12th	5th	5th	4th	4th	4th	1st	2nd	3rd	5th	4th	4th	3rd	4th	Ret		785
6	(Australia) Shae Davies	21/88	5th	5th	7th	8th	19th	7th	2nd	2nd	6th	6th	5th	5th	1st	4th	6th	6th	Ret	4th	3rd	3rd		765
7	(Australia) Max Twigg	8	10th	8th	10th	10th	7th	8th	3rd	1st	12th	9th	6th	Ret	13th	Ret	8th	8th	6th	10th	13th	15th		517
8	(Australia) Duvashen Padayachee	20	Ret	15th	Ret	14th	11th	9th	12th	15th	8th	7th	7th	4th	8th	14th	9th	9th	7th	7th	7th	6th		433.5
9	(Australia) Damien Flack	19	12th	EX	13th	12th	9th	11th	8th	7th	9th	8th	9th	6th	5th	8th	11th	11th	10th	9th	15th	Ret		425.5
10	(Australia) Shane Smollen	56	18th	11th	14th	13th	14th	14th	14th	11th	7th	Ret	Ret	Ret	15th	9th	10th	12th	9th	8th	8th	7th		324
11	(Australia) Stephen Grove	4	17th	13th	15th	20th	17th	Ret	10th	4th	14th	11th	12th	10th	Ret	Ret	13th	15th	14th	11th	16th	14th		285
12	(Australia) Tony Bates	24	11th	Ret	DNS	18th	21st	17th	Ret	9th	10th	10th	8th	7th	Ret	10th	Ret	DNS	DNS	12th	12th	13th		235.5
13	(Australia) Tony Walls	5	16th	17th	17th	22nd	20th	18th	17th	18th	16th	15th	17th	13th	16th	12th	18th	16th	15th	15th	9th	9th		227.5
14	(New Zealand) Paul Kelly	90				15th	12th	15th			15th	Ret	10th	12th	11th	13th	12th	10th	11th	Ret	11th	8th		215
15	(Australia) James Koundouris	47	9th	9th	11th	11th	8th	10th	9th	10th	11th	Ret												210.5
16	(Australia) James Bergmuller	31	15th	14th	18th	16th	13th	13th	15th	Ret	Ret	14th	11th	16th	14th	11th	Ret	DNS	DNS	13th	10th	10th		209.5
17	(Australia) Marc Cini	9	Ret	12th	12th	19th	16th	19th	11th	16th	Ret	13th	13th	11th	Ret	Ret	15th	14th	12th	Ret	Ret	11th		201
18	(Australia) Matt Kingsley	50	7th	10th	5th	6th	10th	4th	13th	Ret														200
19	(Australia) Renee Gracie	55	19th	16th	19th	21st	18th	16th	20th	17th	Ret	16th	14th	17th	18th	Ret	17th	17th	17th	16th	14th	12th		173.5
20	(Australia) Adam Gowans	21												3rd	7th	Ret	7th	7th	5th					171
21	(Australia) Michael Loccisano	10	14th	Ret	16th	17th	15th	Ret	16th	Ret	13th	12th	15th	14th	12th	Ret	16th	18th	16th	14th	Ret	Ret		166
22	(Australia) Karl Reindler	5	6th	6th	6th	7th	Ret	6th																157
23	(Australia) Steven Johnson	17	8th	Ret	9th	9th	5th	5th																144
24	(Australia) Richard Muscat	34							18th	14th				2nd	9th	6th								139
25	(Australia) Rusty French	6												18th	17th	15th	19th	19th	DNS					42
26	(Australia) Gavin Bullas	16															14th	13th	13th					40
27	(Australia) Martin Wagg	77									17th	17th	16th	19th	Ret	Ret								35
28	(Australia) Andrew Jones								19th	12th														34.5

Colour	Result
Gold	Winner
Silver	Second place
Bronze	Third place
Green	Points classification
Blue	Non-points classification
Blue	Non-classified finish (NC)
Purple	Retired, not classified (Ret)
Red	Did not qualify (DNQ)
Red	Did not pre-qualify (DNPQ)
Black	Disqualified (DSQ)
White	Did not start (DNS)
White	Withdrew (WD)
White	Race cancelled (C)
Blank	Did not practice (DNP)
Blank	Did not arrive (DNA)
Blank	Excluded (EX)

Bold - Pole position
Italics - Fastest lap

=== Professional Class ===
Pos.	Driver	Pts.
1	(New Zealand) Craig Baird	1014
2	(Australia) Nick Percat	968
3	(Australia) Warren Luff	924
4	(New Zealand) Steven Richards	916.5
5	(Australia) Michael Patrizi	828
6	(Australia) Shae Davies	793
7	(Australia) Duvashen Padayachee	553
8	(Australia) Renee Gracie	444
9	(Australia) Matt Kingsley	233
10	(Australia) Richard Muscat	188.5
11	(Australia) Karl Reindler	157
12	(Australia) Steven Johnson	144
13	(Australia) Andrew Jones	78

=== Elite Class ===
Pos.	Driver	Pts.
1	(Australia) Max Twigg	988
2	(Australia) Damien Flack	926
3	(Australia) Shane Smollen	768
4	(New Zealand) Stephen Grove	607
5	(Australia) Tony Walls	575.5
6	(Australia) Tony Bates	534
7	(Australia) James Bergmuller	524.5
8	(Australia) Paul Kelly	506
9	(Australia) James Koundouris	498
10	(Australia) Marc Cini	479.5
11	(Australia) Michael Loccisano	416
12	(Australia) Adam Gowans	294
13	(Australia) Rusty French	108
14	(Australia) Gavin Bullas	90
15	(Australia) Martin Wagg	84
