= 2009 The Island 300 =

2009 Supercar Championship event

(Victoria (state)) 2009 The Island 300
Event Information
- Round 12 of 14 in the 2009 V8 Supercar Championship Series
- Date: 7–8 November 2009
- Location: Phillip Island, Victoria
- Venue: Phillip Island Grand Prix Circuit
- Weather: Fine

Results
Race 1
Distance	22 laps	100 km
Pole position	Jason Bright; Britek Motorsport	1:33.6487
Winner	Jamie Whincup; Triple Eight Race Engineering	38:06.6490
Race 2
Distance	44 laps	200 km
Pole position	Jamie Whincup; Triple Eight Race Engineering	1:35.1992
Winner	Jamie Whincup; Triple Eight Race Engineering	1:17:54.0865

The 2009 The Island 300 was the twelfth round of the 2009 V8 Supercar Championship Series. It was the 16th ATCC/V8 Supercar event to be held at the Phillip Island Grand Prix Circuit in the sprint format, the second event to be held at the venue in 2009, and was held on the weekend of 6 to 8 November in Phillip Island, Victoria. The event was organised after the Desert 400, set to be held at the Bahrain International Circuit, was removed from the 2009 calendar and shifted into the 2010 season in order to better link up with the newly announced round to be held at nearby Yas Marina Circuit in Abu Dhabi.

Qualifying for race one provided a surprise package with Jason Bright claiming pole position, setting a time nearly four-tenths faster than nearest competitor Will Davison. The Britek Motorsport driver was ultimately unable to sustain the pace for the race which was won by championship leader Jamie Whincup. Whincup would dominate proceedings the following day by taking pole position and winning the second race. Scoring the maximum 300 points, Whincup had extended his championship lead out to over a hundred points over Davison with two rounds remaining.

== Background ==
The event was held on the weekend of 6 to 8 November 2009. It was the 16th V8 Supercar event to be held at Phillip Island Grand Prix Circuit in the sprint format, and consisted of one 100 kilometre race held as Race 21 on Saturday, with a 200 kilometre race held on Sunday as Race 22.

=== Entry list ===
There were 29 drivers entered into this event. 18 drivers would compete in a VE Holden Commodore while ten drivers would utilise the FG Ford Falcon and one, Michael Patrizi of Paul Cruickshank Racing, would remain with the BF Ford Falcon.

=== Support categories ===
Category	Races	Round winner
Saloon Cars	3	(Australia) Timothy Rowse (Holden Commodore (VT))
Targa Invitational	3	(Australia) Greg Garwood (Porsche RS GT3)

== Race results ==
=== Race 21 ===
==== Qualifying ====
Pos	No	Name	Team	Vehicle	Shootout	Qualifying
1	25	(Australia) Jason Bright	Britek Motorsport	Ford Falcon (FG)	1:33.6487	1:34.0903
2	22	(Australia) Will Davison	Holden Racing Team	Holden Commodore (VE)	1:34.0346	1:34.3631
3	1	(Australia) Jamie Whincup	Triple Eight Race Engineering	Ford Falcon (FG)	1:34.1541	1:34.1805
4	7	(Australia) Todd Kelly	Kelly Racing	Holden Commodore (VE)	1:34.2253	1:34.4735
5	15	(Australia) Rick Kelly	Kelly Racing	Holden Commodore (VE)	1:34.4099	1:34.4699
6	33	(Australia) Lee Holdsworth	Garry Rogers Motorsport	Holden Commodore (VE)	1:34.4810	1:34.4531
7	888	(Australia) Craig Lowndes	Triple Eight Race Engineering	Ford Falcon (FG)	1:34.4921	1:34.1760
8	9	(New Zealand) Shane van Gisbergen	Stone Brothers Racing	Ford Falcon (FG)	1:34.5078	1:34.3459
9	111	(New Zealand) Fabian Coulthard	Paul Cruickshank Racing	Ford Falcon (FG)	1:34.7177	1:34.4982
10	5	(Australia) Mark Winterbottom	Ford Performance Racing	Ford Falcon (FG)	1:35.1458	1:34.4097
11	2	(Australia) Garth Tander	Holden Racing Team	Holden Commodore (VE)		1:34.5076
12	17	(Australia) Steven Johnson	Dick Johnson Racing	Ford Falcon (FG)		1:34.5157
13	18	(Australia) James Courtney	Dick Johnson Racing	Ford Falcon (FG)		1:34.5505
14	8	(New Zealand) Jason Richards	Brad Jones Racing	Holden Commodore (VE)		1:34.6892
15	4	(Australia) Alex Davison	Stone Brothers Racing	Ford Falcon (FG)		1:34.7535
16	24	(Australia) David Reynolds	Walkinshaw Racing	Holden Commodore (VE)		1:34.8512
17	39	(Australia) Russell Ingall	Paul Morris Motorsport	Holden Commodore (VE)		1:34.8910
18	34	(Australia) Michael Caruso	Garry Rogers Motorsport	Holden Commodore (VE)		1:34.9231
19	67	(Australia) Tim Slade	Paul Morris Motorsport	Holden Commodore (VE)		1:34.9446
20	10	(Australia) Paul Dumbrell	Walkinshaw Racing	Holden Commodore (VE)		1:35.0608
21	3	(Australia) Jason Bargwanna	Tasman Motorsport	Holden Commodore (VE)		1:35.1193
22	14	(Australia) Cameron McConville	Brad Jones Racing	Holden Commodore (VE)		1:35.1524
23	51	(New Zealand) Greg Murphy	Tasman Motorsport	Holden Commodore (VE)		1:35.1692
24	55	(Australia) Tony D'Alberto	Rod Nash Racing	Holden Commodore (VE)		1:35.3998
25	11	(Australia) Jack Perkins	Kelly Racing	Holden Commodore (VE)		1:35.4166
26	6	(New Zealand) Steven Richards	Ford Performance Racing	Ford Falcon (FG)		1:35.4837
27	12	(Australia) Dean Fiore	Triple F Racing	Holden Commodore (VE)		1:35.6362
28	333	(Australia) Michael Patrizi	Paul Cruickshank Racing	Ford Falcon (BF)		1:36.0544
29	16	(Australia) Mark McNally	Kelly Racing	Holden Commodore (VE)		1:36.8857

==== Race ====
Pos	No	Name	Team	Vehicle	Laps	Time/Retired	Grid	Points
1	1	(Australia) Jamie Whincup	Triple Eight Race Engineering	Ford Falcon (FG)	22	38:06.6490	3	150
2	22	(Australia) Will Davison	Holden Racing Team	Holden Commodore (VE)	22	+1.8s	2	138
3	15	(Australia) Rick Kelly	Kelly Racing	Holden Commodore (VE)	22	+2.3s	5	129
4	2	(Australia) Garth Tander	Holden Racing Team	Holden Commodore (VE)	22	+4.5s	11	120
5	9	(New Zealand) Shane van Gisbergen	Stone Brothers Racing	Ford Falcon (FG)	22	+5.5s	8	111
6	5	(Australia) Mark Winterbottom	Ford Performance Racing	Ford Falcon (FG)	22	+6.3s	10	102
7	33	(Australia) Lee Holdsworth	Garry Rogers Motorsport	Holden Commodore (VE)	22	+6.7s	6	96
8	17	(Australia) Steven Johnson	Dick Johnson Racing	Ford Falcon (FG)	22	+7.1s	12	90
9	18	(Australia) James Courtney	Dick Johnson Racing	Ford Falcon (FG)	22	+8.9s	13	84
10	8	(New Zealand) Jason Richards	Brad Jones Racing	Holden Commodore (VE)	22	+9.5s	14	78
11	4	(Australia) Alex Davison	Stone Brothers Racing	Ford Falcon (FG)	22	+11.8s	15	72
12	10	(Australia) Paul Dumbrell	Walkinshaw Racing	Holden Commodore (VE)	22	+12.5s	20	69
13	39	(Australia) Russell Ingall	Paul Morris Motorsport	Holden Commodore (VE)	22	+12.7s	17	66
14	111	(New Zealand) Fabian Coulthard	Paul Cruickshank Racing	Ford Falcon (FG)	22	+13.9s	9	63
15	51	(New Zealand) Greg Murphy	Tasman Motorsport	Holden Commodore (VE)	22	+15.2s	23	60
16	25	(Australia) Jason Bright	Britek Motorsport	Ford Falcon (FG)	22	+15.6s	1	57
17	6	(New Zealand) Steven Richards	Ford Performance Racing	Ford Falcon (FG)	22	+16.0s	26	54
18	24	(Australia) David Reynolds	Walkinshaw Racing	Holden Commodore (VE)	22	+16.8s	16	51
19	55	(Australia) Tony D'Alberto	Rod Nash Racing	Holden Commodore (VE)	22	+17.8s	24	48
20	34	(Australia) Michael Caruso	Garry Rogers Motorsport	Holden Commodore (VE)	22	+18.7s	18	45
21	67	(Australia) Tim Slade	Paul Morris Motorsport	Holden Commodore (VE)	22	+19.3s	19	42
22	12	(Australia) Dean Fiore	Triple F Racing	Holden Commodore (VE)	22	+19.9s	27	39
23	3	(Australia) Jason Bargwanna	Tasman Motorsport	Holden Commodore (VE)	22	+20.4s	21	36
24	14	(Australia) Cameron McConville	Brad Jones Racing	Holden Commodore (VE)	22	+22.5s	22	33
25	11	(Australia) Jack Perkins	Kelly Racing	Holden Commodore (VE)	22	+23.5s	25	30
26	16	(Australia) Mark McNally	Kelly Racing	Holden Commodore (VE)	22	+25.4s	29	27
27	333	(Australia) Michael Patrizi	Paul Cruickshank Racing	Ford Falcon (BF)	22	+37.7s	28	24
28	888	(Australia) Craig Lowndes	Triple Eight Race Engineering	Ford Falcon (FG)	22	+54.4s	7	21
29	7	(Australia) Todd Kelly	Kelly Racing	Holden Commodore (VE)	21	+ 1 lap	4	18
Fastest Lap

=== Race 22 ===
==== Qualifying ====
Pos	No	Name	Team	Vehicle	Time
1	1	(Australia) Jamie Whincup	Triple Eight Race Engineering	Ford Falcon (FG)	1:35.1992
2	5	(Australia) Mark Winterbottom	Ford Performance Racing	Ford Falcon (FG)	1:35.2470
3	10	(Australia) Paul Dumbrell	Walkinshaw Racing	Holden Commodore (VE)	1:35.4984
4	8	(New Zealand) Jason Richards	Brad Jones Racing	Holden Commodore (VE)	1:35.5161
5	15	(Australia) Rick Kelly	Kelly Racing	Holden Commodore (VE)	1:35.5433
6	9	(New Zealand) Shane van Gisbergen	Stone Brothers Racing	Ford Falcon (FG)	1:35.5745
7	17	(Australia) Steven Johnson	Dick Johnson Racing	Ford Falcon (FG)	1:35.5747
8	25	(Australia) Jason Bright	Britek Motorsport	Ford Falcon (FG)	1:35.6667
9	22	(Australia) Will Davison	Holden Racing Team	Holden Commodore (VE)	1:35.6711
10	34	(Australia) Michael Caruso	Garry Rogers Motorsport	Holden Commodore (VE)	1:35.7320
11	7	(Australia) Todd Kelly	Kelly Racing	Holden Commodore (VE)	1:35.7848
12	888	(Australia) Craig Lowndes	Triple Eight Race Engineering	Ford Falcon (FG)	1:35.8131
13	2	(Australia) Garth Tander	Holden Racing Team	Holden Commodore (VE)	1:35.8234
14	111	(New Zealand) Fabian Coulthard	Paul Cruickshank Racing	Ford Falcon (FG)	1:35.8551
15	4	(Australia) Alex Davison	Stone Brothers Racing	Ford Falcon (FG)	1:35.8700
16	33	(Australia) Lee Holdsworth	Garry Rogers Motorsport	Holden Commodore (VE)	1:35.8702
17	67	(Australia) Tim Slade	Paul Morris Motorsport	Holden Commodore (VE)	1:36.0147
18	18	(Australia) James Courtney	Dick Johnson Racing	Ford Falcon (FG)	1:36.0313
19	39	(Australia) Russell Ingall	Paul Morris Motorsport	Holden Commodore (VE)	1:36.1764
20	3	(Australia) Jason Bargwanna	Tasman Motorsport	Holden Commodore (VE)	1:36.2916
21	51	(New Zealand) Greg Murphy	Tasman Motorsport	Holden Commodore (VE)	1:36.3223
22	24	(Australia) David Reynolds	Walkinshaw Racing	Holden Commodore (VE)	1:36.3596
23	14	(Australia) Cameron McConville	Brad Jones Racing	Holden Commodore (VE)	1:36.4367
24	6	(New Zealand) Steven Richards	Ford Performance Racing	Ford Falcon (FG)	1:36.4701
25	55	(Australia) Tony D'Alberto	Rod Nash Racing	Holden Commodore (VE)	1:36.6728
26	333	(Australia) Michael Patrizi	Paul Cruickshank Racing	Ford Falcon (BF)	1:36.7024
27	12	(Australia) Dean Fiore	Team Kiwi Racing	Holden Commodore (VE)	1:36.7710
28	11	(Australia) Jack Perkins	Kelly Racing	Holden Commodore (VE)	1:36.8395
29	16	(Australia) Mark McNally	Kelly Racing	Holden Commodore (VE)	1:38.0072

==== Race ====
Pos	No	Name	Team	Vehicle	Laps	Time/Retired	Grid	Points
1	1	(Australia) Jamie Whincup	Triple Eight Race Engineering	Ford Falcon (FG)	44	1:17:54.0865		150
2	15	(Australia) Rick Kelly	Kelly Racing	Holden Commodore (VE)	44	+5.2s		138
3	2	(Australia) Garth Tander	Holden Racing Team	Holden Commodore (VE)	44	+13.3s		129
4	18	(Australia) James Courtney	Dick Johnson Racing	Ford Falcon (FG)	44	+15.1s		120
5	25	(Australia) Jason Bright	Britek Motorsport	Ford Falcon (FG)	44	+18.7s		111
6	9	(New Zealand) Shane van Gisbergen	Stone Brothers Racing	Ford Falcon (FG)	44	+20.0s		102
7	888	(Australia) Craig Lowndes	Triple Eight Race Engineering	Ford Falcon (FG)	44			96
8	10	(Australia) Paul Dumbrell	Walkinshaw Racing	Holden Commodore (VE)	44			90
9	111	(New Zealand) Fabian Coulthard	Paul Cruickshank Racing	Ford Falcon (FG)	44			84
10	34	(Australia) Michael Caruso	Garry Rogers Motorsport	Holden Commodore (VE)	44			78
11	22	(Australia) Will Davison	Holden Racing Team	Holden Commodore (VE)	44			72
12	4	(Australia) Alex Davison	Stone Brothers Racing	Ford Falcon (FG)	44			69
13	33	(Australia) Lee Holdsworth	Garry Rogers Motorsport	Holden Commodore (VE)	44			66
14	6	(New Zealand) Steven Richards	Ford Performance Racing	Ford Falcon (FG)	44			63
15	8	(New Zealand) Jason Richards	Brad Jones Racing	Holden Commodore (VE)	44			60
16	67	(Australia) Tim Slade	Paul Morris Motorsport	Holden Commodore (VE)	44			57
17	55	(Australia) Tony D'Alberto	Rod Nash Racing	Holden Commodore (VE)	44			54
18	24	(Australia) David Reynolds	Walkinshaw Racing	Holden Commodore (VE)	44			51
19	3	(Australia) Jason Bargwanna	Tasman Motorsport	Holden Commodore (VE)	44			48
20	333	(Australia) Michael Patrizi	Paul Cruickshank Racing	Ford Falcon (BF)	44			45
21	7	(Australia) Todd Kelly	Kelly Racing	Holden Commodore (VE)	44			42
22	16	(Australia) Mark McNally	Kelly Racing	Holden Commodore (VE)	44			39
23	11	(Australia) Jack Perkins	Kelly Racing	Holden Commodore (VE)	44			36
24	17	(Australia) Steven Johnson	Dick Johnson Racing	Ford Falcon (FG)	44			33
25	14	(Australia) Cameron McConville	Brad Jones Racing	Holden Commodore (VE)	44			30
26	51	(New Zealand) Greg Murphy	Tasman Motorsport	Holden Commodore (VE)	43	+ 1 lap		27
27	39	(Australia) Russell Ingall	Paul Morris Motorsport	Holden Commodore (VE)	43	+ 1 lap		24
Ret	12	(Australia) Dean Fiore	Triple F Racing	Holden Commodore (VE)	18	Retired		
Ret	5	(Australia) Mark Winterbottom	Ford Performance Racing	Ford Falcon (FG)	1	Retired		
Fastest Lap

== Standings ==
- After Race 22 of 26

Pos	No	Name	Team	Points
1	1	Jamie Whincup	Triple Eight Race Engineering	2905
2	22	Will Davison	Holden Racing Team	2783
3	2	Garth Tander	Holden Racing Team	2565
4	888	Craig Lowndes	Triple Eight Race Engineering	2292
5	5	Mark Winterbottom	Ford Performance Racing	1964
