= 2016 Porsche Carrera Cup Australia =

Australian motor racing series

Seasons
- ← 2015 2017 →

The 2016 Porsche Carrera Cup Australia was an Australian motor racing series open to Porsche 911 GT3 Cup cars. It was sanctioned by the Confederation of Australian Motor Sport (CAMS) as a National Series with Porsche Cars Australia Pty Ltd appointed as the Category Manager. It was the 12th Carrera Cup to be contested in Australia and the first to be sanctioned as a national series rather than a national championship.

The series was won by Matt Campbell.

== Teams and drivers ==
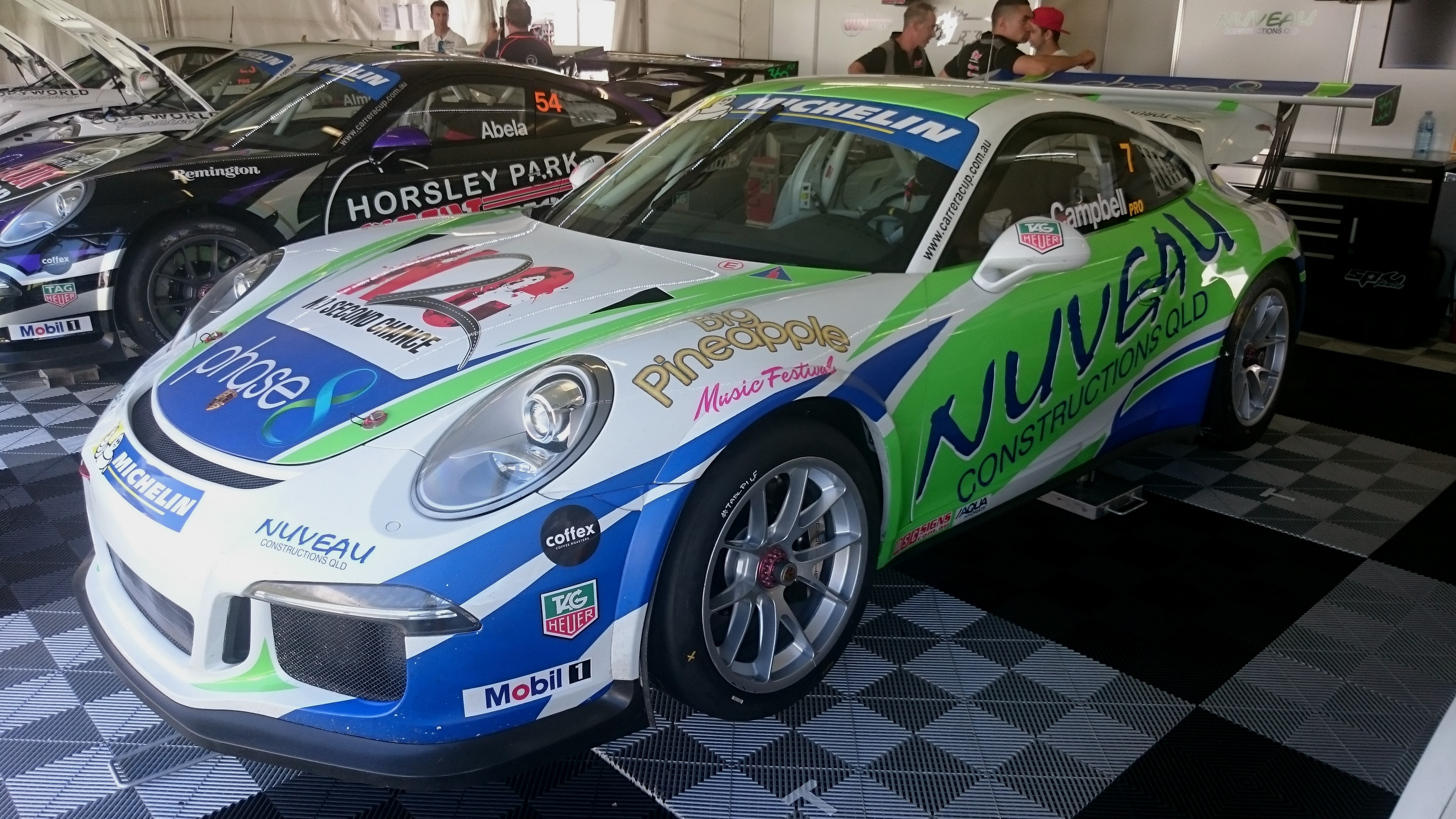
Matt Campbell won the series driving for McElrea Racing

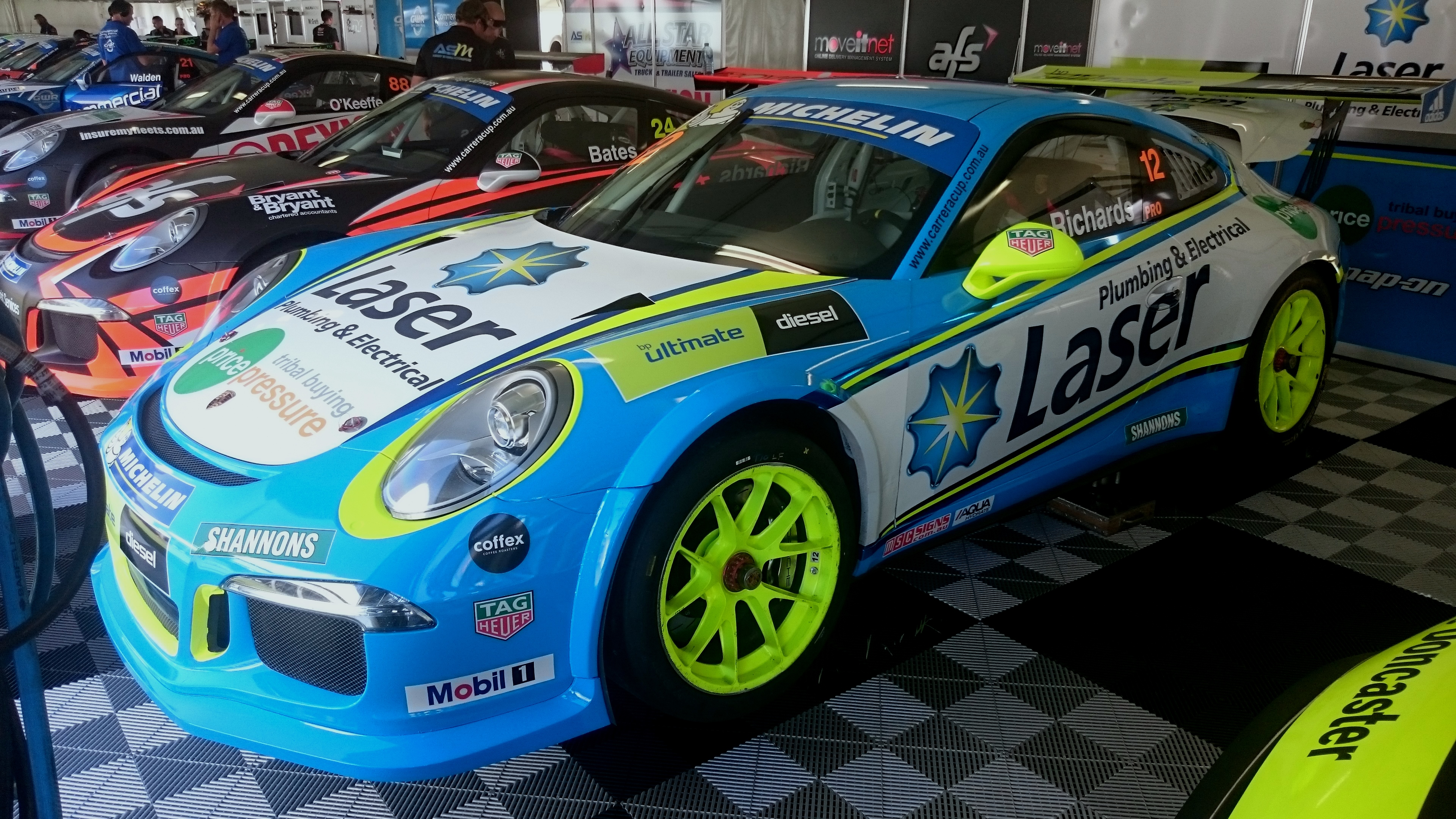
Steven Richards placed fifth in the series

The following teams and drivers contested the series.

Team	Class	No.	Driver	Pro-am co-driver	Rounds
Grove Hire	Challenge	4	(Australia) Stephen Grove	(Australia) Lee Holdsworth	All
McElrea Racing	Pro	7	(Australia) Matt Campbell	(Australia) Geoff Emery	All
McElrea Racing	Pro	45	(Australia) Duvashen Padayachee	(Australia) Roger Lago	All
McElrea Racing	Pro	54	(Australia) James Abela	(Australia) Tony Walls	All
Porsche Centre Melbourne	Pro	8	(Australia) Dean Fiore	(Australia) Jake Camilleri	1–7
Porsche Centre Melbourne	Guest	8	(Australia) Tony Longhurst		8
Porsche Centre Melbourne	Challenge	9	(Australia) Marc Cini	(Australia) Michael Caruso	All
Steve Richards Motorsport	Guest	11	(Australia) Tony Longhurst		7
Steve Richards Motorsport	Pro	12	(New Zealand) Steven Richards	(Australia) Dean Grant	All
Steve Richards Motorsport	Challenge	13	(Australia) James Bergmuller	(Australia) Garth Tander	All
Twigg Motorsport	Guest	18	(Australia) Max Twigg		7
Garth Walden Racing	Pro	21	(Australia) Garth Walden	(Australia) Ash Samadi	All
Tony Bates Racing	Challenge	24	(Australia) Tony Bates	(Australia) David Reynolds	All
Buik Motorsport	Pro	25	(Australia) Alex Davison	(Australia) David-Calvert Jones	All
Buik Motorsport	Pro	26	(Australia) Michael Almond	(Australia) John Goodacre	All
FreeM	Guest	32	(Australia) Daniel Stutterd		7
Wall Racing	Pro	38	(Australia) David Wall	(Australia) Adrian Flack	All
Sonic Motor Racing Services	Challenge	39	(Australia) Adrian Mastronardo	(Australia) Tim Slade	All
Sonic Motor Racing Services	Pro	77	(Australia) Nick McBride	(Australia) Dylan Thomas	All
Sonic Motor Racing Services	Pro	777	(Australia) Ashley Walsh	(Australia) Max Twigg	All
McGrath Estate Agents	Challenge	56	(Australia) Shane Smollen	(Australia) Nick Percat	All
Dexion Supply Centre	Pro	88	(Australia) Dylan O'Keeffe	(Australia) Sam Walter	All
Scott Taylor Motorsport	Pro	222	(New Zealand) Shane van Gisbergen	(New Zealand) Paul Kelly	3
Scott Taylor Motorsport	Challenge	222	(Australia) Scott Taylor		4–5, 7–8
DNA Racing	Pro	360	(Australia) Fraser Ross	(Australia) David Ryan	1–5, 8

All vehicles were Porsche 911 GT3 Cup Type 991 cars.

== Race calendar ==
The championship was contested over eight rounds.

Round		Circuit	City / state	Date	Pole position	Fastest lap	Winning driver	Winning team	Round winner
1	R1	(South Australia) Adelaide Street Circuit	Adelaide, South Australia	4 March	(Australia) Ashley Walsh	(Australia) Matt Campbell	(Australia) Matt Campbell	McElrea Racing	(Australia) Nick McBride
1	R2	(South Australia) Adelaide Street Circuit	Adelaide, South Australia	5 March		(Australia) Ashley Walsh	(Australia) Ashley Walsh	Sonic Motor Racing Services	(Australia) Nick McBride
1	R3	(South Australia) Adelaide Street Circuit	Adelaide, South Australia	6 March		(Australia) Alex Davison	(Australia) Michael Almond	Buik Motorsport	(Australia) Nick McBride
2	R1	(Victoria (state)) Albert Park Grand Prix Circuit	Melbourne, Victoria	17 March	(Australia) Matt Campbell	(Australia) Matt Campbell	(Australia) Matt Campbell	McElrea Racing	(Australia) Alex Davison
2	R2	(Victoria (state)) Albert Park Grand Prix Circuit	Melbourne, Victoria	18 March		(New Zealand) Steven Richards	(Australia) Alex Davison	Buik Motorsport	(Australia) Alex Davison
2	R3	(Victoria (state)) Albert Park Grand Prix Circuit	Melbourne, Victoria	19 March		(Australia) Alex Davison	(Australia) Alex Davison	Buik Motorsport	(Australia) Alex Davison
2	R4	(Victoria (state)) Albert Park Grand Prix Circuit	Melbourne, Victoria	20 March		(Australia) Ashley Walsh	(Australia) Alex Davison	Buik Motorsport	(Australia) Alex Davison
3	R1	(New South Wales) Sydney Motorsport Park	Eastern Creek, New South Wales	30 April	(Australia) Matt Campbell (Australia) Geoff Emery	(New Zealand) Shane van Gisbergen (New Zealand) Paul Kelly	(Australia) Matt Campbell (Australia) Geoff Emery	McElrea Racing	(Australia) Matt Campbell (Australia) Geoff Emery
3	R2	(New South Wales) Sydney Motorsport Park	Eastern Creek, New South Wales	1 May	(Australia) Matt Campbell (Australia) Geoff Emery	(New Zealand) Shane van Gisbergen (New Zealand) Paul Kelly	(Australia) Matt Campbell (Australia) Geoff Emery	McElrea Racing	(Australia) Matt Campbell (Australia) Geoff Emery
4	R1	(Northern Territory) Hidden Valley Raceway	Darwin, Northern Territory	18 June	(Australia) Matt Campbell	(Australia) Matt Campbell	(Australia) Alex Davison	Buik Motorsport	(Australia) Alex Davison
4	R2	(Northern Territory) Hidden Valley Raceway	Darwin, Northern Territory	19 June		(Australia) Alex Davison	(Australia) David Wall	Wall Racing	(Australia) Alex Davison
4	R3	(Northern Territory) Hidden Valley Raceway	Darwin, Northern Territory	19 June		(Australia) Matt Campbell	(Australia) Alex Davison	Buik Motorsport	(Australia) Alex Davison
5	R1	(New South Wales) Sydney Motorsport Park	Eastern Creek, New South Wales	27 August	(Australia) Matt Campbell	(New Zealand) Steven Richards	(Australia) Matt Campbell	McElrea Racing	(Australia) Matt Campbell
5	R2	(New South Wales) Sydney Motorsport Park	Eastern Creek, New South Wales	28 August		(Australia) Ashley Walsh	(Australia) Matt Campbell	McElrea Racing	(Australia) Matt Campbell
6	R1	(Victoria (state)) Sandown Raceway	Melbourne, Victoria	17 September	(Australia) Matt Campbell	(Australia) Alex Davison	(Australia) Matt Campbell	McElrea Racing	(Australia) Alex Davison
6	R2	(Victoria (state)) Sandown Raceway	Melbourne, Victoria	17 September		(Australia) Matt Campbell	(Australia) Matt Campbell	McElrea Racing	(Australia) Alex Davison
6	R3	(Victoria (state)) Sandown Raceway	Melbourne, Victoria	18 September		(Australia) Ashley Walsh	(Australia) Alex Davison	Buik Motorsport	(Australia) Alex Davison
7	R1	(New South Wales) Mount Panorama Circuit	Bathurst, New South Wales	7 October	(Australia) Matt Campbell	(Australia) Ashley Walsh	(Australia) Matt Campbell	McElrea Racing	(Australia) Matt Campbell
7	R2	(New South Wales) Mount Panorama Circuit	Bathurst, New South Wales	8 October		(Australia) Matt Campbell	(Australia) Matt Campbell	McElrea Racing	(Australia) Matt Campbell
7	R3	(New South Wales) Mount Panorama Circuit	Bathurst, New South Wales	9 October		(Australia) Matt Campbell	(Australia) Matt Campbell	McElrea Racing	(Australia) Matt Campbell
8	R1	(Queensland) Surfers Paradise Street Circuit	Surfers Paradise, Queensland	22 October	(Australia) Matt Campbell	(Australia) Ashley Walsh	(Australia) Matt Campbell	McElrea Racing	(Australia) Matt Campbell
8	R2	(Queensland) Surfers Paradise Street Circuit	Surfers Paradise, Queensland	22 October		(Australia) Matt Campbell	(Australia) Matt Campbell	McElrea Racing	(Australia) Matt Campbell
8	R3	(Queensland) Surfers Paradise Street Circuit	Surfers Paradise, Queensland	23 October		(Australia) Ashley Walsh	(Australia) Alex Davison	Buik Motorsport	(Australia) Matt Campbell

== Series standings ==
The series was won by Matt Campbell.

The following table reflects the series standings as at the completion of the season.

Pos.	Driver	ADE (South Australia)			MEL (Victoria (state))				SMP (New South Wales)		HID (Northern Territory)			SMP (New South Wales)		SAN (Victoria (state))			BAT (New South Wales)			SUR (Queensland)			Pts.
1	Matt Campbell	1	**9**	2	**1**	**3**	4	5	**1**	**1**	**3**	16	6	**1**	**1**	**1**	**1**	**Ret**	**1**	**1**	**1**	**1**	**1**	**3**	1204.5
2	Alex Davison	4	8	4	4	1	**1**	**1**	6	7	1	**2**	1	6	4	4	2	1	4	4	19	3	2	1	1072
3	David Wall	7	5	5	5	5	8	6	4	17	2	1	**2**	2	2	3	5	3	2	3	3	6	6	6	993
4	Nick McBride	2	2	3	2	4	3	3	8	2	6	3	17	3	3	2	3	5	7	6	5	12	16	12	940
5	Steven Richards	8	4	Ret	8	2	2	2	12	12	5	4	3	5	7	5	4	2	3	2	2	4	4	5	898.5
6	Ashley Walsh	**3**	1	**Ret**	Ret	10	6	4	7	5	7	9	5	11	6	16	Ret	9	6	5	4	5	5	4	706
7	Michael Almond	6	3	1	10	7	5	8	15	14	Ret	8	16	9	8	7	Ret	10	5	8	6	2	3	2	676.5
8	Dean Fiore	9	7	7	3	18	Ret	9	14	13	11	7	4	4	5	6	6	4	10	9	DNS				544
9	Duvashen Padayachee	10	17	9	7	9	9	7	17	8	17	13	10	12	11	9	7	7	15	12	10	7	7	7	501.5
10	Dylan O'Keeffe	DNS	13	Ret	11	15	11	11	18	10	4	5	9	7	9	Ret	8	6	9	11	8	8	Ret	10	435
11	Fraser Ross	5	6	6	6	6	7	Ret	13	9	8	15	15	8	12							9	8	8	421.5
12	James Abela	Ret	14	10	9	8	16	10	19	Ret	9	6	7	10	10	8	9	11	12	10	9	11	9	9	415.5
13	Tony Bates^{†}	11	10	8	13	14	15	Ret	3	15	14	12	12	15	16	10	10	Ret	20	13	12	15	14	13	379.5
14	James Bergmuller^{†}	15	18	12	15	Ret	13	16	2	6	12	17	Ret	17	18	15	13	12	16	14	13	14	12	14	368
15	Garth Walden	Ret	12	Ret	12	11	10	DSQ	20	18	Ret	10	8	13	13	11	11	8	8	7	7	10	10	Ret	361.5
16	Shane Smollen^{†}	12	11	Ret	16	13	Ret	12	10	3	10	11	11	16	14	Ret	15	13	13	Ret	15	DNS	DNS	DNS	315
17	Stephen Grove^{†}	13	15	Ret	14	12	12	13	11	11	Ret	14	Ret	14	15	12	14	14	17	Ret	14	13	11	11	290.5
18	Adrian Mastronardo^{†}	16	19	13	17	16	14	14	9	16	15	18	18	18	17	14	16	16	19	17	20	18	17	16	257
19	Marc Cini^{†}	14	16	11	18	17	Ret	15	16	19	13	Ret	14	19	19	13	12	15	21	16	18	16	13	15	242.5
20	Shane van Gisbergen								5	4															117
21	Scott Taylor										16	Ret	13	20	20				18	15	17	DNS	DNS	DNS	80
22	Max Twigg								7	5									11	18	11				44
23	Daniel Stutterd																		14	Ret	16				22
24	Tony Longhurst																		DNS	DNS	DNS	17	15	Ret	20
Pos.	Driver	ADE (South Australia)			MEL (Victoria (state))				SMP (New South Wales)		HID (Northern Territory)			SMP (New South Wales)		SAN (Victoria (state))			BAT (New South Wales)			SUR (Queensland)			Pts.

Colour	Result
Gold	Winner
Silver	Second place
Bronze	Third place
Green	Points classification
Blue	Non-points classification
Blue	Non-classified finish (NC)
Purple	Retired, not classified (Ret)
Red	Did not qualify (DNQ)
Red	Did not pre-qualify (DNPQ)
Black	Disqualified (DSQ)
White	Did not start (DNS)
White	Withdrew (WD)
White	Race cancelled (C)
Blank	Did not practice (DNP)
Blank	Did not arrive (DNA)
Blank	Excluded (EX)

Bold - Pole position
Italics - Fastest lap
† - Challenge Class
