= 2014 Australian GT Championship =

Motor racing competition

Seasons
- ← 2013 2015 →

The 2014 Australian GT Championship was an Australian motor racing competition open to FIA GT3 cars and similar cars as approved for the championship. It was sanctioned by the Confederation of Australian Motor Sport (CAMS) as a National Championship with The Australian GT Sportscar Group Pty Ltd appointed by CAMS as the Category Manager. The title, which was the 18th Australian GT Championship, was won by Richard Muscat, driving a Mercedes-Benz SLS AMG GT3.

== Race calendar ==
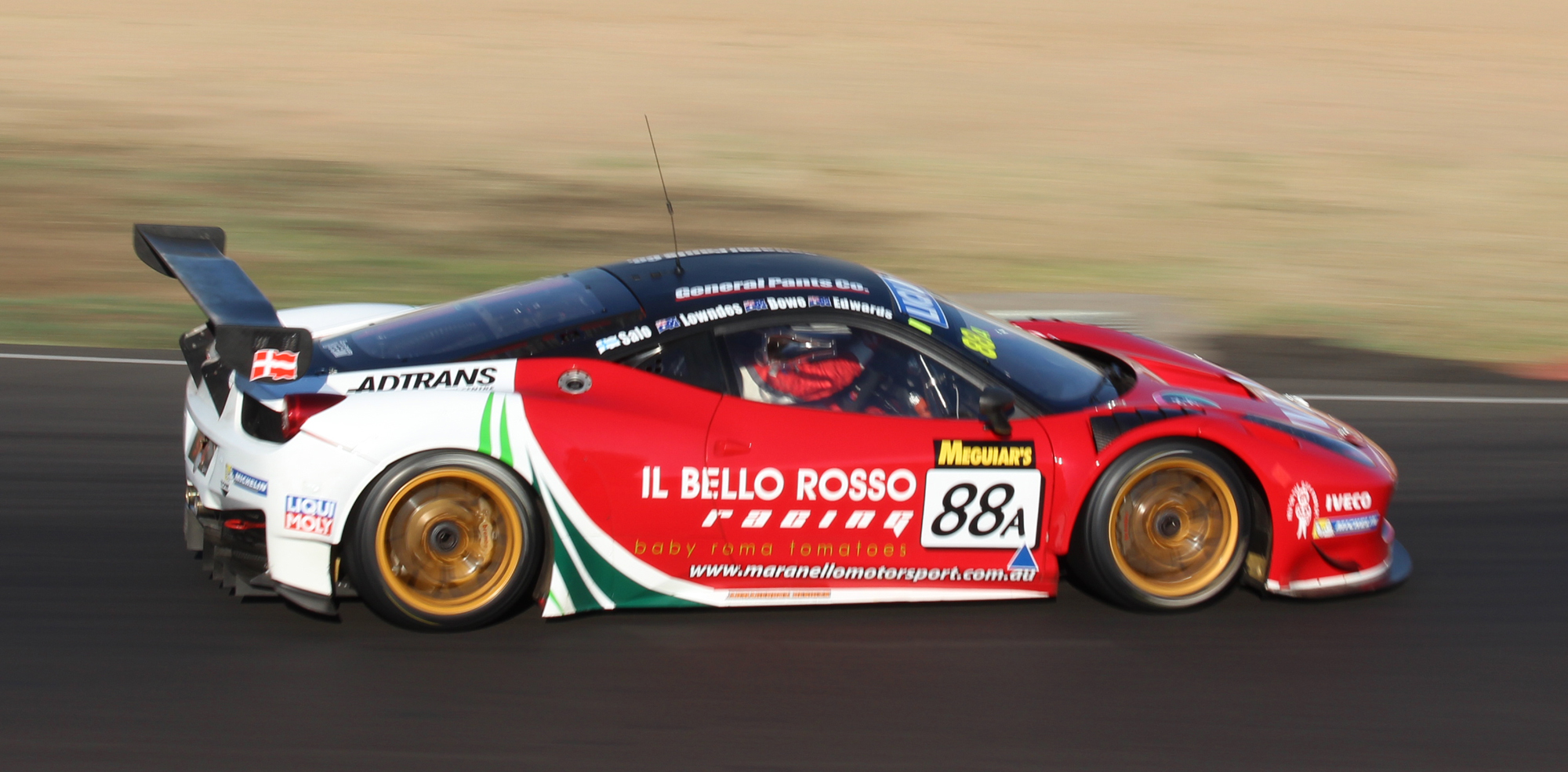
John Bowe and Peter Edwards placed third in the championship driving a Ferrari 458 Italia. The car is pictured at the non-championship 2014 Liqui Moly Bathurst 12 Hour

The championship was contested over a six-round series.

Round	Circuit	Date	Format
1	Sandown Raceway	28 – 30 March	Two races
2	Phillip Island	23 – 25 May	One race
3	Townsville	4–6 July	Three races
4	Sydney Motorsport Park	22–24 August	Two races
5	Sandown Raceway	12 – 14 September	Three races
6	Highlands Motorsport Park	8–9 November	Two races

The results for each round of the Championship were determined by the number of points scored by each driver within their division at that round.

== Divisions ==
Drivers' titles were awarded in four divisions.

- GT Championship - for FIA GT3 specification vehicles
- GT Trophy - for older specification FIA GT3 vehicles
- GT Challenge - for cars that no longer fitted within the GT Championship and GT Trophy divisions
- GT Sports - for GT4 specification cars

== Points system ==
Championship points were awarded to each eligible driver, based on their qualifying position at each round of the Championship relative to the other drivers within their division, and on their finishing position in each race of the Championship relative to the other drivers within their division, in accordance with the following table.

Position	1st	2nd	3rd	4th	5th	6th	7th	8th	9th	10th	11th	12th	13th	14th	15th	16th	17th	18th	19th	All other finishers
Qualifying	10	8	7	6	5	4	3	2	1	0	0	0	0	0	0	0	0	0	0	-
Races	50	42	35	30	25	20	18	16	14	12	10	9	8	7	6	5	4	3	2	1

== Championship results ==
GT Championship
Position	Driver	No.	Car	Competitor / Team	Total
1	Richard Muscat	36	Mercedes-Benz SLS AMG GT3	Wilson Security / Erebus Academy	595
2	Tony Quinn	7	Aston Martin Vantage GT3	VIP Petfoods	542
3	John Bowe	88	Ferrari 458 Italia	IL Bello Rosso	470
3	Peter Edwards	88 & 08	Ferrari 458 Italia; Bentley Continental GT3	IL Bello Rosso; Flying B Racing / Asia Pacific Digital	314
4	Klark Quinn	1	McLaren MP4-12C	Darrell Lea	347
5	Justin McMillan	48	Lamborghini Gallardo FL2	Interlloy M Motorsport	347
5	Steven Richards	48	Lamborghini Gallardo FL2	Interlloy M Motorsport	247
6	Tony D'Alberto	49 & 88	Ferrari 458 Italia	DeFelice Homes & IL Bello Rosso	147
7	Ross Lilley	63	Lamborghini Gallardo LP600	Koala Furniture	146
8	Garth Tander	7	Aston Martin Vantage GT3	VIP Petfoods	145
9	James Koundouris	47	Porsche 911 GT3-R	Supabarn Supermarkets	138
10	Andrew MacPherson	51	Porsche 911 GT3-R Type 997	Amac Motorsport	130
11	Jim Manolios	29	Ferrari 458 Italia	Trofeo Motorsports / Pirelli	127
11	Ryan Millier	29	Ferrari 458 Italia	Trofeo Motorsports / Pirelli	123
12	Steven McLaughlan	75	Audi R8 LMS Ultra	JAMEC PEM Racing	115
13	David Russell	48	Lamborghini Gallardo FL2	Interlloy M Motorsport	101
14	John Morriss	34	Porsche 911 GT3-R Type 997	The GT Factory	89
15	Steve Owen	47	Porsche 911 GT3-R	Supabarn Supermarkets	84
16	Adrian Deitz	8	Ferrari 458 Italia	Maranello Motorsport	69
17	Warren Luff	75	Audi R8 LMS Ultra	JAMEC PEM Racing	58
18	Shane van Gisbergen	1	McLaren MP4-12C	Darrell Lea	55
19	Jack Le Brocq	36	Mercedes-Benz SLS AMG GT3	Wilsons Security / Erebus Academy	52
20	Josh Hunt	8	Ferrari 458 Italia	Maranello Motorsport	43
21	Ben Porter	51	Porsche 911 GT3-R Type 997	Amac Motorsport	35
22	Peter Fitzgerald	2	Audi R8 LMS GT3 Ultra	Evolve Technik / Fitzgerald Racing Services	33
23	Tony DeFelice	49	Ferrari 458 Italia	DeFelice Homes	32
24	Ian Tulloch	22	Chevrolet Camaro GT3	Interislander	30
24	Craig Lowndes	22	Chevrolet Camaro GT3	Interislander	30
25	Craig Baird	1	McLaren MP4-12C	Darrell Lea	30
26	Cameron McConville	8	Ferrari 458 Italia GT3	Maranello Motorsport	26
27	Jono Lester	27	Ferrari 458 Italia GT3	Trass Family Motorsport	26
28	Paul Kelly	63	Lamborghini Gallardo	Koala Furniture	10
29	Roger Lago	23	Lamborghini Gallardo LP600	Lago Racing	1
GT Trophy
Position	Driver	No.	Car	Competitor / Team	Total
1	Rod Salmon	6	Audi R8 LMS	Swirk	574
1	Nathan Antunes	6	Audi R8 LMS	Swirk	506
2	Dean Koutsoumidis	71	Audi R8 LMS	Equity-One Mortgage Fund	543
2	James Winslow	71	Audi R8 LMS	Equity-One Mortgage Fund	543
3	Michael Hovey	73	Porsche 911 GT3 Cup Car Type 997	Associated Projects	374
3	Matt Campbell	73	Porsche 911 GT3 Cup Car Type 997	Associated Projects	235
4	Jan Jinadasa	77	Lamborghini Gallardo LP520	JJA Consulting Group	356
4	Daniel Gaunt	77	Lamborghini Gallardo LP520	JJA Consulting Group	356
5	Theo Koundouris	69	Porsche 911 GT3 Cup Car	Supabarn Supermarkets	265
6	Simon Ellingham	33	Porsche 911 GT3 Cup Car Type 997	Fastway Couriers	249
7	Ockert Fourie	72	Audi R8 LMS	OLOF Family & Cosmetic	174
7	John Magro	72	Audi R8 LMS	OLOF Family & Cosmetic	174
8	Indiran Padayachee	35	Porsche 911 GT3 Cup Car Type 996	Rentcorp	136
9	Kevin Weeks	5	Ford GT	Superloc Racing	132
10	Steven McLaughlan	75	Audi R8 LMS	JAMEC PEM Racing	97
11	Andre Heimgartner	33	Porsche 911 GT3 Cup Car Type 997	Fastway Racing	76
12	Dale Paterson	70	Mosler MT900	Dale Paterson	70
13	Liam Talbot	6	Audi R8 LMS	Swirk	68
14	Ben Eggleston	38	Aston Martin DBRS9	Eggleston Motorsport	56
15	Sam Power	69	Porsche 911 GT3 Cup Car	Supabarn Supermarkets	52
16	Barton Mawer	98	Lotus Exige	Prep'd Motorsport	48
17	Andrew MacPherson	51	Porsche 911 GT3 Cup Car	Amac Motorsport	47
18	Duvashen Padayachee	35	Porsche 911 GT3 Cup Car	Rentcorp	36
19	Keith Kassulke	52	Ascari KZ1R	Keith Kassulke	36
20	Jono Lester	33	Porsche 911 GT3 Cup Car	Fastway Couriers	29
22	Sam Fillmore	23	Porsche 911 GT3 Cup Car	Motorsport Services	22
22	Danny Stutterd	23	Porsche 911 GT3 Cup Car	Motorsport Services	22
23	Peter Conroy	14	Porsche 911 GT3 Cup Car Type 997	Peter Conroy Motorsport	18
23	Dean Grant	14	Porsche 911 GT3 Cup Car Type 997	Peter Conroy Motorsport	18
24	Warren Luff	75	Audi R8 LMS	JAMEC PEM Racing	15
GT Challenge
Position	Driver	No.	Car	Competitor / Team	Total
1	Ben Foessel	3	Porsche 911 GT3 Cup Car Type 997	Motor School	649
2	Brendon Cook	25	Porsche 911 GT3 Cup Car Type 997	Walz Group	503
2	Matt Kingsley	25	Porsche 911 GT3 Cup Car Type 997	Walz Group	503
3	Paul Van Leonhout	11	Ferrari 458 Challenge	Mt. Magnet Drilling	193
4	Michael Almond	3	Porsche 911 GT3 Cup Car Type 997	Motor School	150
5	George Foessel	3	Porsche 911 GT3 Cup Car Type 997	Motor School	149
6	Renato Loberto	11	Ferrari 458 Challenge	Mt. Magnet Drilling	102
7	Indiran Padayachee	35	Porsche 911 GT3 Cup Car Type 996	Rentcorp	77
8	Jeff Neale	21	Porsche 911 GT3 Cup Car Type 997	RockStar Racing	43
8	Terry Knight	21	Porsche 911 GT3 Cup Car Type 997	RockStar Racing	43
GT Sports
Position	Driver	No.	Car	Competitor / Team	Total
1	Mark Griffith	19	Ginetta G50 GT4	Hog's Breath Cafe	593
2	Tony Martin	9	Ginetta G50 GT4	TM Motorsports	425
3	Tony Alford	54	Lotus Exige V6 Cup R	Donut King	297
4	Mark O'Connor	54	Lotus Exige V6 Cup R	Donut King	110
5	Hayden Cooper	74	Ginetta G50 GT4	Hayden Cooper	102
6	Karl Reindler	19	Ginetta G50 GT4	Hogs Breath Cafe	58
7	Grant Bromley	9	Ginetta G50 GT4	TM Motorsports	52
8	Ryan McLeod	54	Lotus Exige V6 Cup R	Donut King	42

- The driver gaining the highest points total over all rounds of the Championship, within their division, was declared the winner of that division.
- If two drivers competed in the same automobile for all, or the majority of the rounds, then the final division position was awarded to both drivers.

== 2014 Australian Tourist Trophy ==
The 2014 Australian Tourist Trophy was awarded by the Confederation of Australian Motor Sport to the driver accumulating the highest aggregate points total from Rounds 2 and 6 of the Australian GT Championship. The title, which was the 24th Australian Tourist Trophy, was won by Richard Muscat driving a Mercedes-Benz SLS AMG GT3.
