= Duvashen Padayachee =

Australian racing driver (born 1990)

- Nationality: Australian
- Born: 4 May 1990 (age 36)
- Categorisation: FIA Silver

Awards
- 2012: International Series British Formula 3 (runner-up in class national); 2014: Mount Panorama Production Sports Car One Hour race (winner)

Duvashen Padayachee (born 4 May 1990) is an Australian racing driver.

== Career ==
=== Beginnings ===
Padayachee began his career in racing in 2010, competing in the Pacific Formula BMW. With the achievements of 49 points, he was ranked 11th in the overall standings. A year later, he raced in the JK Racing Asia Series was fifth. In 2011, Padayachee started well in the Radical Australia Cup, where, however, was not classified.

=== Formula Renault 2.0 ===
In 2011, in addition to competing in Formula Ford2011, Padayachee also raced in British Formula Renault. The main series of 19 points gave him 16th position in the overall standings, and the final round was the thirteenth.

=== Formula 3 ===
For the 2012 season, Padayachee signed a contract with the Finnish team Double R Racing to compete in the International Series British Formula 3 and European Formula 3. He was only classified in the British edition. In the classroom National, he won six races and 21 podium finishes. This allowed him to win the title in his class.

=== Porsche ===
In 2013, Padayachee moved to the Australian Porsche Carrera Cup, joining Team BRM.

== Racing record ==
=== Career summary ===
Season	Series	Team	Races	Wins	Poles	F/laps	Podiums	Points	Position
2010	Formula BMW Pacific	Eurasia Motorsport	15	0	0	0	1	49	11th
2011	JK Racing Asia Series	Eurasia Motorsport	14	0	0	0	1	100	5th
2012	British Formula 3 International Series - Rookie	Double R Racing	28	6	0	7	22	377	2nd
2012	FIA Formula 3 European Championship	Double R Racing	5	0	0	0	0	0	NC†
2012	PSCRAA Enduro Championship	Rentcorp Forklifts	1	0	0	0	0	15	33rd
2013	Australian Carrera Cup Championship	Team BRM	20	0	0	0	0	433.5	8th
2014	Australian Carrera Cup Championship	Team BRM	21	0	0	0	0	406	11th
2014	Australian GT Championship - GT Trophy	Rentcorp Motorsport	3	0	0	0	0	57	16th
2015	Australian Carrera Cup Championship	Team BRM	21	0	0	0	0	366.5	12th
2015	24H Series - SP2	MARC Cars Australia	2	1	0	0	1	51	10th
2016	Porsche Carrera Cup Australia	McElrea Racing	24	0	0	0	0	504.5	9th
2016	Australian Endurance Championship	Walkinshaw Racing	2	0	1	0	2	364	5th
2017	Porsche Carrera Cup Australia	Garth Walden Racing	2	0	0	0	0	0	NC†
2017	Australian GT Championship	Supabarn Supermarkets	6	0	0	0	2	266	13th
2017	Intercontinental GT Challenge	Walkinshaw GT3	1	0	0	0	0	0	NC†
2018	Australian GT Championship	McElrea Racing	4	0	0	0	1	510	14th
2019	Porsche Carrera Cup Australia	Garth Walden Racing	25	0	0	0	0	455	10th
2020	Porsche Carrera Cup Australia	Garth Walden Racing	4	0	0	0	0	63	9th
2021	TCR Australia Touring Car Series	HMO Customer Racing	6	0	0	0	0	95	22nd
2022	Porsche Carrera Cup Australia	Garth Walden Racing							
2022	Intercontinental GT Challenge	Valmont Racing							

† – Padayachee was ineligible to score points.
