= 2015 Australian Carrera Cup Championship =

Australian motor racing competition

Seasons
- ← 2014 2016 →

The 2015 Australian Carrera Cup Championship was an Australian motor racing competition for Porsche 911 GT3 Cup cars. It was sanctioned by the Confederation of Australian Motor Sport (CAMS) as a national championship with Porsche Cars Australia Pty Ltd appointed as the Category Manager by CAMS. The title, which was the eleventh Porsche Carrera Cup Australia Championship, was won by Nick Foster.

Sonic Motor Racing Services driver Foster won eight races during the season, with two runs of four consecutive victories including weekend sweeps at Townsville and Sandown. Foster finished sixty-four points ahead of Finance EZI Racing's David Russell, who took eleven podium finishes during the season but only one win, at Bathurst. Third place in the championship went to Matt Campbell (McElrea Racing), who won six races, including a weekend sweep at Surfers Paradise as part of a four-race win streak to close the season. Defending champion Steven Richards won five of the first six races, but only returned to the podium four times over the remaining sixteen races to finish fourth in the championship. Foster's teammate Nick McBride and Hamilton Autohaus driver Shane Smollen were the other race-winners, winning at Albert Park and Phillip Island respectively. Foster also won the Professional sub-classification by 46 points, while Smollen won the Elite sub-classification by 60 points ahead of Stephen Grove.

== Teams and drivers ==
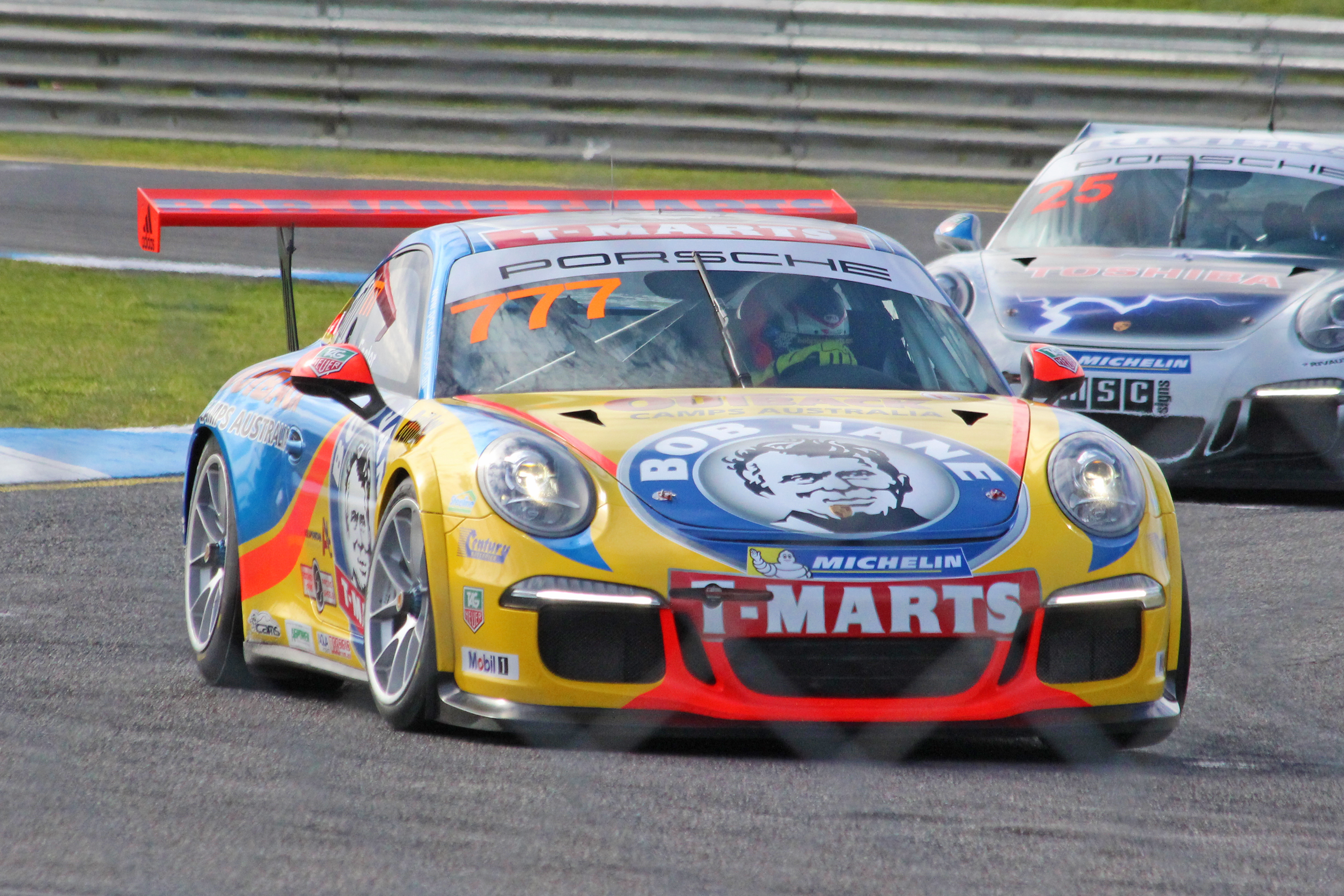
Nick Foster won the championship driving for Sonic Motor Racing Services.

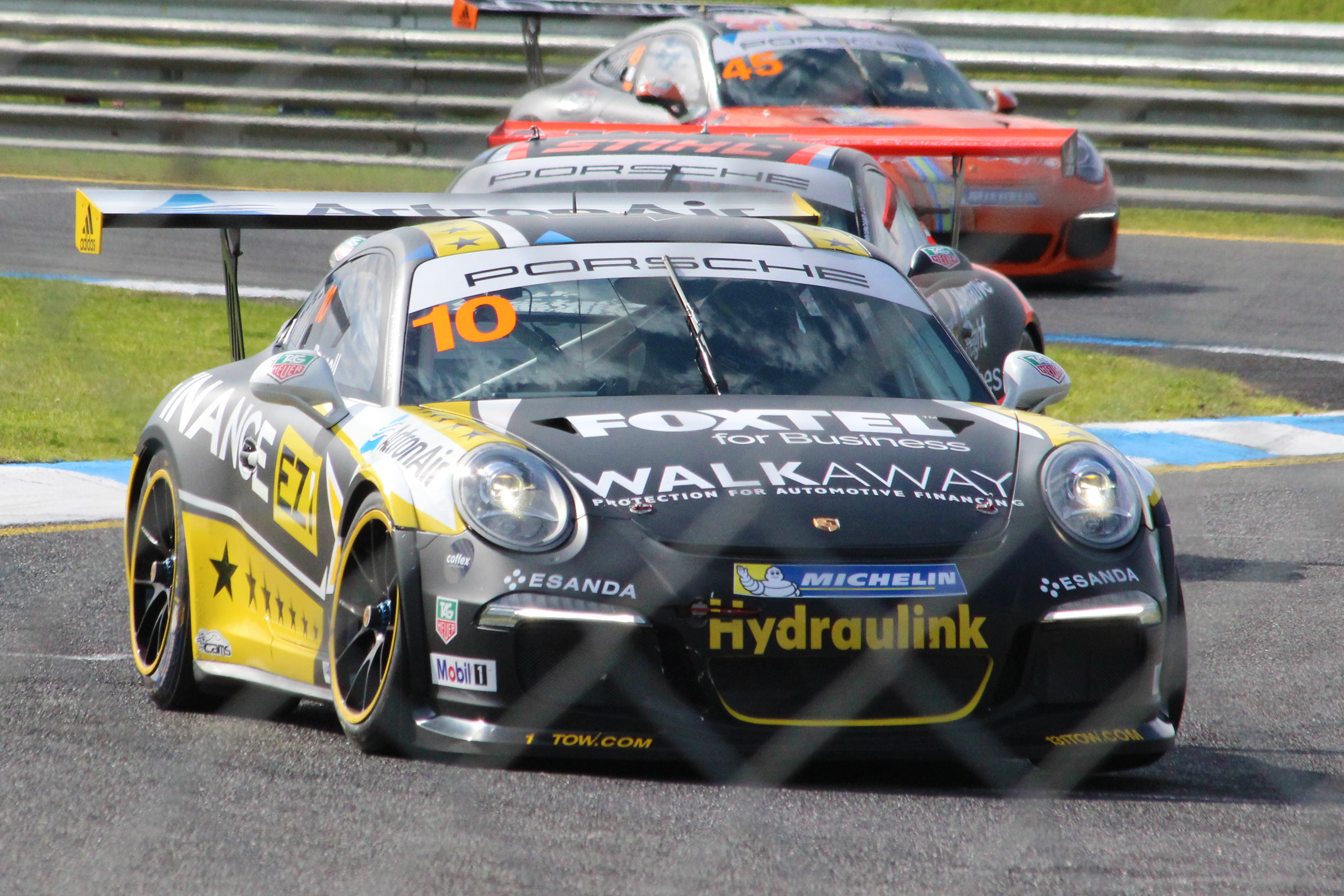
David Russell finished runner-up in the championship driving for Finance EZI Racing.

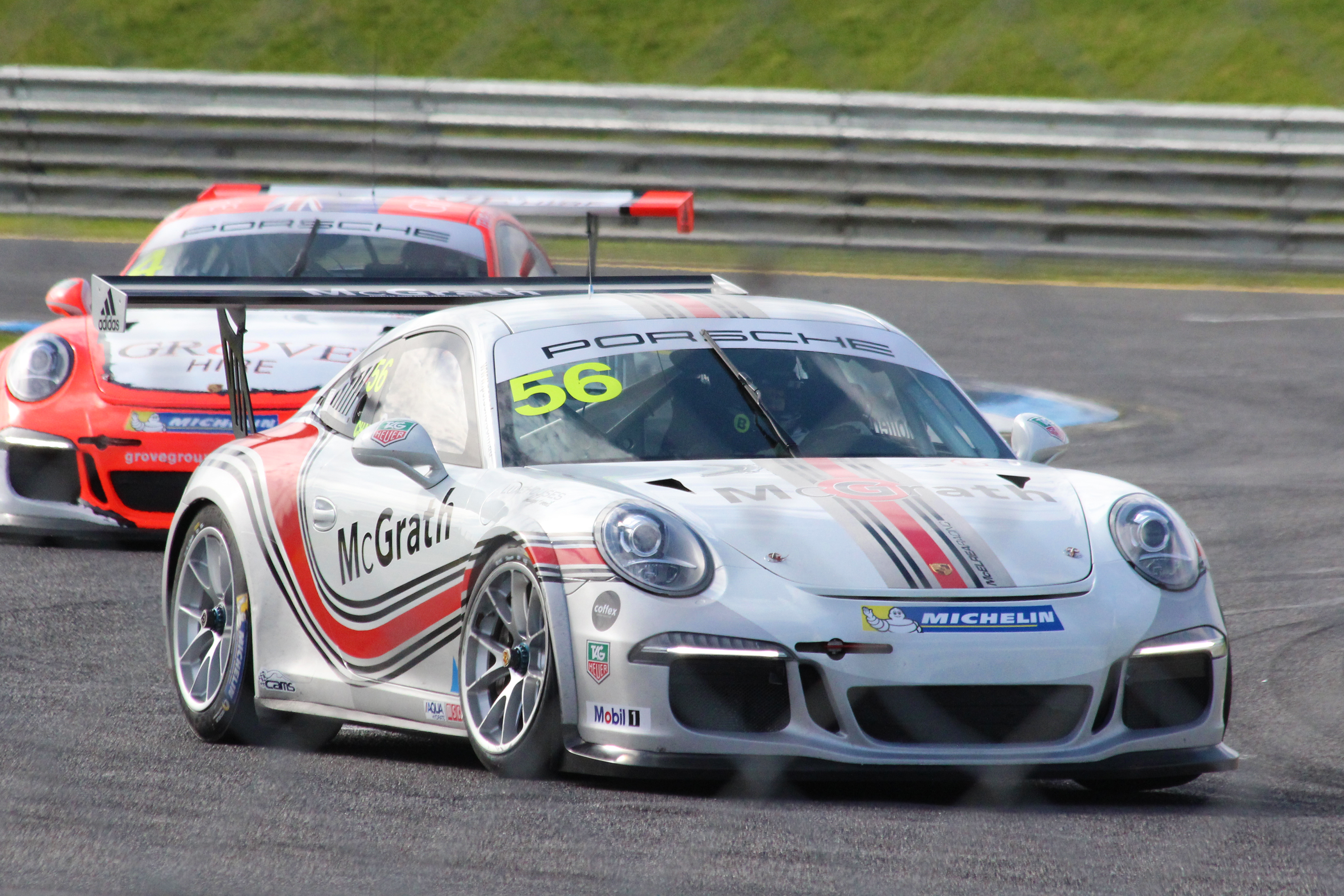
Shane Smollen won the Elite class driving for Hamilton Autohaus.

The following teams and drivers contested the championship.

Team	No.	Driver	Rd 3 co-driver	Class	Rounds
Steve Richards Motorsport	1	(New Zealand) Steven Richards	(Australia) Dean Grant	Professional	All
Grove Group	4	(Australia) Stephen Grove	(New Zealand) Scott McLaughlin	Elite	All
McElrea Racing	5	(Australia) Spike Goddard		Professional	1–2
McElrea Racing	5	(Australia) Tony Walls		Elite	7
McElrea Racing	7	(Australia) Matt Campbell	(Australia) Tim Miles	Professional	All
McElrea Racing	56	(Australia) Shane Smollen	(Australia) Nick Percat	Elite	All
Garth Walden Racing	6	(Australia) Ash Samadi	(Australia) Dean Fiore	Elite	All
Porsche Centre Melbourne	8	(New Zealand) Craig Baird	(Australia) Max Twigg	Professional	All
Hallmarc	9	(Australia) Marc Cini	(Germany) Christopher Mies	Elite	All
Finance EZI Racing	10	(Australia) David Russell	(Australia) James Koundouris	Professional	All
Team BRM	11	(Australia) Simon Hodge	(Australia) Ray Angus	Professional	1–5
Team BRM	11	(Australia) John Magro		Professional	6
Team BRM	22	(Australia) Richard Muscat	(Australia) Sam Walter	Professional	All
Team BRM	45	(Australia) Duvashen Padayachee	(Australia) Indiran Padayachee	Professional	All
Porsche Centre Brighton	13	(Australia) James Bergmuller	(Australia) Alex Davison	Elite	All
Buik Motorsport	14	(Australia) Cameron McConville	(Australia) John Goodacre	Professional	1–3
Buik Motorsport	25	(Australia) John Martin		Professional	4–8
Buik Motorsport	26	(Australia) Michael Almond	(Australia) John Karytinos	Professional	All
AVCS	18	(Australia) Max Twigg		Elite	2
Lago Racing	23	(Australia) Roger Lago	(Australia) Steve Owen	Elite	1–4
Tony Bates Racing	24	(Australia) Tony Bates	(New Zealand) Daniel Gaunt	Elite	All
Sonic Motor Racing Services	39	(Australia) Adrian Mastronardo	(Australia) Tim Slade	Elite	All
Sonic Motor Racing Services	77	(Australia) Nick McBride	(Australia) Neale Muston	Professional	All
Sonic Motor Racing Services	777	(Australia) Nick Foster	(Australia) Dylan Thomas	Professional	All
DNA Racing	65	(Australia) Fraser Ross	(Australia) David Ryan	Professional	All
Koala Motorsport	69	(Australia) Brenton Griguol		Elite	7
Scott Taylor Motorsport	88	(Australia) Shae Davies	(Australia) Geoff Emery	Professional	2–3, 5-6, 8
Scott Taylor Motorsport	222	(Australia) Scott Taylor	(Australia) Dean Canto	Elite	1–5, 7–8
Scott Taylor Motorsport	222	(Australia) Aaron Seton		Professional	6

All vehicles were Porsche 911 GT3 Cup Type 991 cars, as mandated by the championship regulations.

== Race calendar ==
The championship was contested over eight rounds.

Round		Circuit	City / state	Date	Pole position	Fastest lap	Winning driver	Winning team	Round winner
1	R1	(South Australia) Adelaide Street Circuit	Adelaide, South Australia	27 February	(Australia) Nick Foster	(New Zealand) Steven Richards	(New Zealand) Steven Richards	Steve Richards Motorsport	(New Zealand) Steven Richards
1	R2	(South Australia) Adelaide Street Circuit	Adelaide, South Australia	28 February		(Australia) Nick Foster	(New Zealand) Steven Richards	Steve Richards Motorsport	(New Zealand) Steven Richards
1	R3	(South Australia) Adelaide Street Circuit	Adelaide, South Australia	1 March		(New Zealand) Steven Richards	(New Zealand) Steven Richards	Steve Richards Motorsport	(New Zealand) Steven Richards
2	R1	(Victoria (state)) Albert Park Grand Prix Circuit	Melbourne, Victoria	13 March	(Australia) Nick McBride	(Australia) Cameron McConville	(Australia) Nick McBride	Sonic Motor Racing Services	(New Zealand) Steven Richards
2	R2	(Victoria (state)) Albert Park Grand Prix Circuit	Melbourne, Victoria	14 March		(New Zealand) Steven Richards	(New Zealand) Steven Richards	Steve Richards Motorsport	(New Zealand) Steven Richards
2	R3	(Victoria (state)) Albert Park Grand Prix Circuit	Melbourne, Victoria	15 March		(Australia) Shae Davies	(New Zealand) Steven Richards	Steve Richards Motorsport	(New Zealand) Steven Richards
3	R1	(Victoria (state)) Phillip Island Grand Prix Circuit	Phillip Island, Victoria	23 May	(Australia) Cameron McConville (Australia) John Goodacre	(Australia) Stephen Grove (New Zealand) Scott McLaughlin	(Australia) Shane Smollen (Australia) Nick Percat	Hamilton Autohaus	(Australia) Shane Smollen (Australia) Nick Percat
3	R2	(Victoria (state)) Phillip Island Grand Prix Circuit	Phillip Island, Victoria	24 May	(Australia) Matt Campbell (Australia) Tim Miles	(Australia) Stephen Grove (New Zealand) Scott McLaughlin	(Australia) Nick Foster (Australia) Dylan Thomas	Sonic Motor Racing Services	(Australia) Shane Smollen (Australia) Nick Percat
4	R1	(Queensland) Townsville Street Circuit	Townsville, Queensland	11 July	(Australia) David Russell	(Australia) Richard Muscat	(Australia) Nick Foster	Sonic Motor Racing Services	(Australia) Nick Foster
4	R2	(Queensland) Townsville Street Circuit	Townsville, Queensland	12 July		(New Zealand) Steven Richards	(Australia) Nick Foster	Sonic Motor Racing Services	(Australia) Nick Foster
4	R3	(Queensland) Townsville Street Circuit	Townsville, Queensland	12 July		(Australia) Nick Foster	(Australia) Nick Foster	Sonic Motor Racing Services	(Australia) Nick Foster
5	R1	(New South Wales) Sydney Motorsport Park	Eastern Creek, New South Wales	22 August	(Australia) Nick Foster	(Australia) Matt Campbell	(Australia) Matt Campbell	McElrea Racing	(Australia) Nick Foster
5	R2	(New South Wales) Sydney Motorsport Park	Eastern Creek, New South Wales	22 August		(Australia) Nick Foster	(Australia) Matt Campbell	McElrea Racing	(Australia) Nick Foster
5	R3	(New South Wales) Sydney Motorsport Park	Eastern Creek, New South Wales	23 August		(Australia) Nick Foster	(Australia) Nick Foster	Sonic Motor Racing Services	(Australia) Nick Foster
6	R1	(Victoria (state)) Sandown Raceway	Melbourne, Victoria	12 September	(Australia) Matt Campbell	(Australia) Nick Foster	(Australia) Nick Foster	Sonic Motor Racing Services	(Australia) Nick Foster
6	R2	(Victoria (state)) Sandown Raceway	Melbourne, Victoria	12 September		(Australia) Nick McBride	(Australia) Nick Foster	Sonic Motor Racing Services	(Australia) Nick Foster
6	R3	(Victoria (state)) Sandown Raceway	Melbourne, Victoria	13 September		(Australia) Nick McBride	(Australia) Nick Foster	Sonic Motor Racing Services	(Australia) Nick Foster
7	R1	(New South Wales) Mount Panorama Circuit	Bathurst, New South Wales	9 October	(Australia) Matt Campbell	(Australia) Matt Campbell	(Australia) David Russell	Finance EZI Racing	(Australia) Matt Campbell
7	R2	(New South Wales) Mount Panorama Circuit	Bathurst, New South Wales	10 October		Race abandoned (Note: Race abandoned due to heavy rain.)			(Australia) Matt Campbell
7	R3	(New South Wales) Mount Panorama Circuit	Bathurst, New South Wales	11 October		(Australia) Matt Campbell	(Australia) Matt Campbell	McElrea Racing	(Australia) Matt Campbell
8	R1	(Queensland) Surfers Paradise Street Circuit	Surfers Paradise, Queensland	24 October	(Australia) David Russell	(Australia) Matt Campbell	(Australia) Matt Campbell	McElrea Racing	(Australia) Matt Campbell
8	R2	(Queensland) Surfers Paradise Street Circuit	Surfers Paradise, Queensland	25 October		(New Zealand) Craig Baird	(Australia) Matt Campbell	McElrea Racing	(Australia) Matt Campbell
8	R3	(Queensland) Surfers Paradise Street Circuit	Surfers Paradise, Queensland	25 October		(Australia) Matt Campbell	(Australia) Matt Campbell	McElrea Racing	(Australia) Matt Campbell

== Championship standings ==
Points system

Championship points were awarded at each race as per the table below:

Points format	Position																								
Points format	1st	2nd	3rd	4th	5th	6th	7th	8th	9th	10th	11th	12th	13th	14th	15th	16th	17th	18th	19th	20th	21st	22nd	23rd	24th	25th
Three races	60	54	48	42	36	32	29	26	23	20	18	16	14	12	11	10	9	8	7	6	5	4	3	2	1
Two races	90	81	72	63	54	48	43.5	39	34.5	30	27	24	21	18	16.5	15	13.5	12	10.5	9	7.5	6	4.5	3	1.5

Each driver was deemed by the Category Manager to be in either the Professional Class or the Elite Class for the purpose of awarding class points. For class awards, each driver in each class who was classified as a finisher received points in accordance with the above pointscore table relative to each other driver in their class.

=== Overall ===
Pos.	Driver	No.	ADE (South Australia)			MEL (Victoria (state))			PHI (Victoria (state))		TOW (Queensland)			SYD (New South Wales)			SAN (Victoria (state))			BAT (New South Wales)		SUR (Queensland)			Pts.
1	(Australia) Nick Foster	777	**Ret**	Ret	DNS	Ret	10th	5th	6th	1st	1st	**1st**	**1st**	**2nd**	2nd	1st	1st	**1st**	**1st**	3rd	4th	3rd	3rd	3rd	956
2	(Australia) David Russell	10	2nd	4th	3rd	5th	8th	6th	Ret	16th	**3rd**	2nd	17th	5th	3rd	3rd	4th	4th	5th	1st	**2nd**	**2nd**	2nd	2nd	892
3	(Australia) Matt Campbell	7	Ret	15th	Ret	4th	7th	7th	Ret	**11th**	4th	6th	5th	1st	**1st**	**5th**	**2nd**	2nd	2nd	**2nd**	1st	1st	**1st**	**1st**	860
4	(New Zealand) Steven Richards	1	1st	**1st**	**1st**	2nd	1st	**1st**	7th	10th	6th	3rd	2nd	3rd	Ret	8th	Ret	7th	4th	4th	3rd	12th	12th	11th	846.5
5	(New Zealand) Craig Baird	8	4th	2nd	2nd	6th	4th	2nd	9th	7th	5th	5th	3rd	6th	4th	2nd	Ret	10th	6th	5th	5th	5th	4th	Ret	806
6	(Australia) Richard Muscat	22	5th	5th	6th	8th	6th	8th	12th	3rd	2nd	4th	4th	Ret	DNS	9th	3rd	3rd	3rd	8th	7th	6th	5th	4th	754
7	(Australia) Nick McBride	77	3rd	3rd	4th	**1st**	**3rd**	23rd	4th	5th	DNS	10th	7th	8th	6th	6th	17th	11th	11th	6th	6th	9th	8th	7th	692
8	(Australia) Michael Almond	26	7th	7th	7th	10th	9th	9th	11th	Ret	7th	7th	Ret	10th	7th	7th	8th	5th	8th	7th	11th	4th	7th	8th	538
9	(Australia) Shane Smollen	56	15th	14th	12th	17th	17th	16th	1st	2nd	12th	11th	13th	13th	13th	13th	9th	16th	14th	12th	13th	10th	15th	15th	445
10	(Australia) Shae Davies	88				7th	5th	4th	5th	8th				4th	5th	4th	12th	13th	9th			8th	6th	6th	438
11	(Australia) Stephen Grove	4	11th	13th	13th	13th	18th	18th	2nd	6th	13th	12th	11th	14th	11th	15th	13th	15th	15th	14th	14th	18th	14th	13th	388
12	(Australia) Duvashen Padayachee	45	Ret	11th	9th	9th	13th	12th	16th	17th	9th	16th	8th	12th	9th	12th	Ret	17th	12th	9th	9th	7th	16th	10th	366.5
13	(Australia) Fraser Ross	65	8th	9th	Ret	14th	12th	10th	15th	Ret	11th	19th	12th	9th	8th	19th	10th	6th	Ret	10th	10th	15th	9th	9th	359.5
14	(Australia) Cameron McConville	14	6th	6th	5th	3rd	2nd	3rd	**3rd**	Ret															322
15	(Australia) Tony Bates	24	9th	10th	10th	15th	14th	17th	14th	19th	Ret	13th	10th	DNS	DNS	DNS	7th	14th	13th	13th	12th	11th	11th	12th	284.5
16	(Australia) John Martin	25									10th	9th	6th	7th	Ret	10th	Ret	9th	7th	11th	8th	20th	10th	5th	282
17	(Australia) Simon Hodge	11	10th	8th	8th	Ret	Ret	14th	17th	18th	8th	8th	9th	11th	10th	11th									240.5
18	(Australia) Ash Samadi	6	13th	17th	15th	20th	21st	20th	13th	13th	16th	15th	15th	15th	16th	16th	14th	20th	18th	16th	17th	17th	17th	18th	227
19	(Australia) Adrian Mastronardo	39	Ret	16th	16th	21st	20th	21st	10th	4th	18th	20th	Ret	Ret	14th	17th	16th	18th	17th	18th	20th	19th	Ret	17th	221
20	(Australia) Marc Cini	9	14th	Ret	14th	16th	19th	19th	18th	14th	15th	14th	16th	18th	17th	Ret	15th	19th	19th	17th	19th	14th	Ret	16th	191
21	(Australia) James Bergmuller	13	DNS	DNS	DNS	18th	22nd	22nd	Ret	15th	14th	18th	14th	16th	12th	14th	11th	21st	16th	Ret	18th	13th	13th	14th	183.5
22	(Australia) Roger Lago	23	12th	12th	11th	Ret	15th	15th	8th	9th	DNS	DNS	DNS												145.5
23	(Australia) Scott Taylor	222	16th	18th	17th	19th	23rd	Ret	Ret	12th	17th	17th	Ret	17th	15th	18th				Ret	16th	16th	18th	Ret	135
24	(Australia) Aaron Seton	222															6th	12th	10th						68
25	(Australia) John Magro	11															5th	8th	Ret						62
26	(Australia) Max Twigg	18				11th	11th	13th																	50
27	(Australia) Spike Goddard	5	Ret	DNS	DNS	12th	16th	11th																	44
28	(Australia) Tony Walls	5																		15th	15th				22
29	(Australia) Brenton Griguol	69																		19th	Ret				7

Colour	Result
Gold	Winner
Silver	Second place
Bronze	Third place
Green	Points classification
Blue	Non-points classification
Blue	Non-classified finish (NC)
Purple	Retired, not classified (Ret)
Red	Did not qualify (DNQ)
Red	Did not pre-qualify (DNPQ)
Black	Disqualified (DSQ)
White	Did not start (DNS)
White	Withdrew (WD)
White	Race cancelled (C)
Blank	Did not practice (DNP)
Blank	Did not arrive (DNA)
Blank	Excluded (EX)

Bold - Pole position
Italics - Fastest lap

=== Professional ===
Pos.	Driver	Pts.
1	(Australia) Nick Foster	971
2	(Australia) David Russell	925
3	(Australia) Matt Campbell	883.5
4	(New Zealand) Steven Richards	881
5	(New Zealand) Craig Baird	839
6	(Australia) Richard Muscat	778
7	(Australia) Nick McBride	748
8	(Australia) Michael Almond	557.5
9	(Australia) Shae Davies	478
10	(Australia) Duvashen Padayachee	423.5
11	(Australia) Fraser Ross	416.5
12	(Australia) Cameron McConville	340
13	(Australia) John Martin	292
14	(Australia) Simon Hodge	277
15	(Australia) Aaron Seton	68
16	(Australia) John Magro	62
17	(Australia) Spike Goddard	50

=== Elite ===
Pos.	Driver	Pts.
1	(Australia) Shane Smollen	1178
2	(Australia) Stephen Grove	1118
3	(Australia) Tony Bates	972.5
4	(Australia) Ash Samadi	784
5	(Australia) James Bergmuller	684
6	(Australia) Marc Cini	675
7	(Australia) Adrian Mastronardo	637
8	(Australia) Scott Taylor	459
9	(Australia) Roger Lago	393
10	(Australia) Max Twigg	180
11	(Australia) Tony Walls	84
12	(Australia) Brenton Griguol	26
