= Richard Muscat =

Australian racing driver (born 1992)

- Nationality: Australian
- Born: Richard Daniel Muscat; 9 July 1992 (age 34) Melbourne, Victoria

Supercars Championship career
- Debut season: 2017
- Starts: 13
- Wins: 0
- Podiums: 0
- Poles: 0
- Best finish: 39th in 2018

Previous series
- 2013, 2015 2014: Porsche Carrera Cup Australia; Australian GT Championship

Championship titles
- 2014 2013 2012: Australian GT Championship; Porsche GT3 Cup Australia; Victorian Porsche 944 Challenge

Richard Daniel Muscat (born 9 July 1992) is an Australian former racing driver who last competed in the 24H GT Series in 2020. Muscat had also competed in the Supercars Championship as an endurance driver for Garry Rogers Motorsport.

Muscat had enjoyed a successful developmental career, winning the Victorian Porsche 944 Challenge, the Porsche GT3 Cup Challenge Australia and the 2014 Australian GT Championship in a three year stretch. Soon after, Muscat would compete in the Super2 Series for Garry Rogers Motorsport with aims to compete in the Supercars Championship. After securing several endurance series drives for the outfit, Muscat's career in the category came to an end in 2019.

As of 2026, Muscat's last professional racing appearance came in the 2020 Dubai 24 Hour endurance race.

== Career summary ==
Muscat's debuting in racing cars came in 2012, competing in the Victorian Porsche 944 Challenge. Claiming five of a possible seven pole positions, as well as recording 13 race wins, Muscat become the first rookie to win the title in the championships history.

For 2013, Muscat would graduate to the Porsche GT3 Cup Challenge Australia. He would dominate the series, claiming 13 wins, securing the championship as well as the Jim Richards Endurance Trophy. During the year, Muscat would make sporadic appearances in the 2013 Australian Carrera Cup Championship for Steven Richards Motorsport at Sydney Motorsport Park and Winton Motor Raceway. His best result came in the opening race at Winton, securing a second-placed finish behind Michael Patrizi. His efforts throughout the year led to him being named as the inaugural Shannons Nationals Driver of the Year.

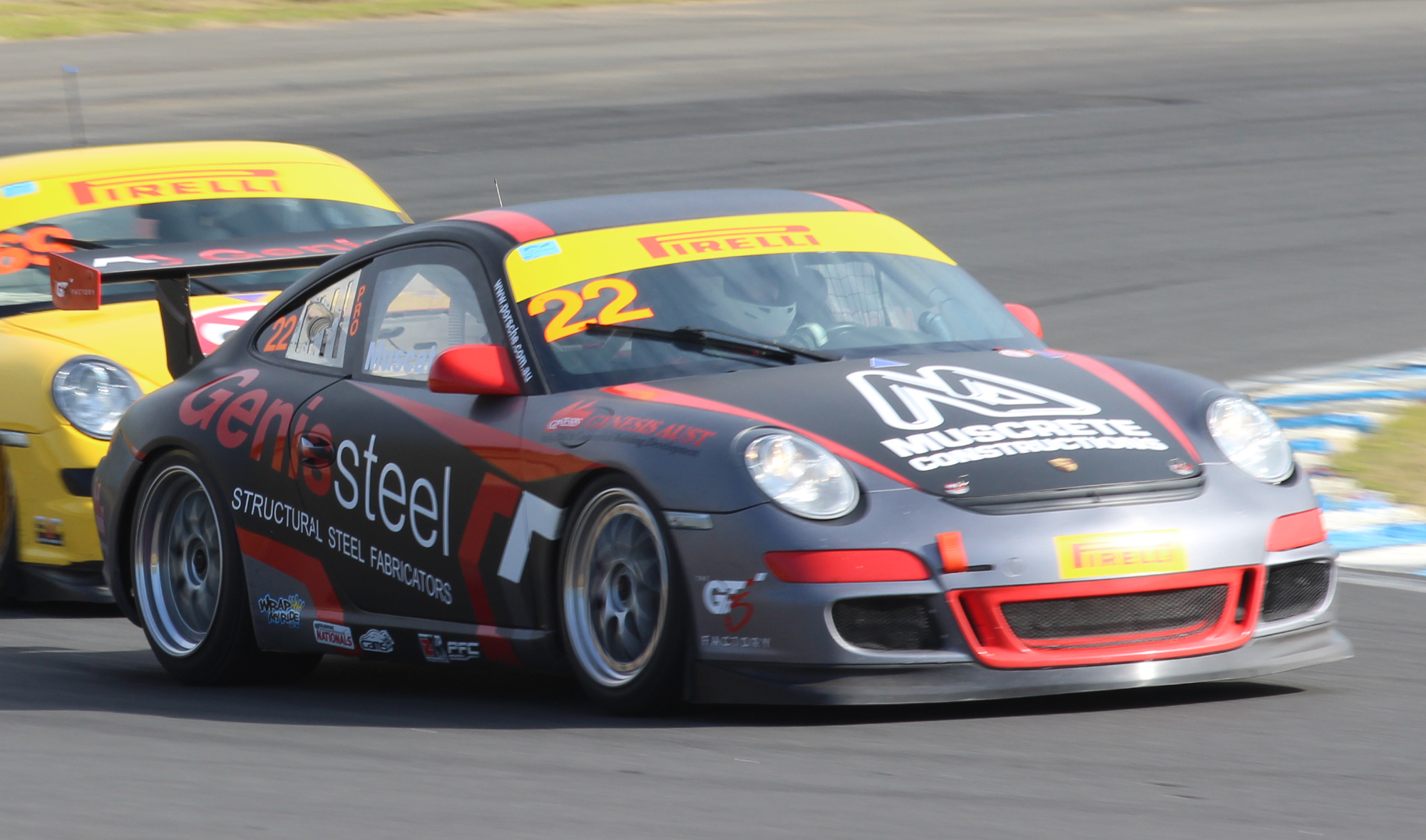
Muscat racing in the Porsche GT3 Cup Challenge Australia

Muscat would step up to the Australian GT Championship in 2014, driving a Mercedes-Benz SLS AMG GT3 as part of the Erebus Motorsport Academy. Claiming seven wins that season, Muscat would win the championship by over 50 points. Along with capturing the Australian Tourist Trophy, this marked Muscat's third championship title in three years. During the year, Muscat would take his talents across the globe, competing in an array of international championships. He made a one-off appearance in the Porsche Carrera Cup Great Britain for Redline Racing at the Snetterton Circuit, claiming two podiums. He would also compete in the 2014 Gulf 12 Hours for Black Falcon alongside Abdulaziz Al Faisal and Hubert Haupt. The team would win the Pro-Am class and finished fourth overall.

For 2015, Muscat would sign with Team BRM to drive in the Australian Carrera Cup Championship. The best-placed of the BRM drivers, Muscat would finish the year sixth in the drivers standings, scoring five podiums and consistently finishing in the top ten. He also competed in the Bathurst 12 Hour that year for Erebus Motorsport alongside Dean Canto and Jack Le Brocq, finishing fifth overall. For his efforts, Muscat was selected as a wildcard entry for the Porsche Supercup scholarship shootout in Germany.

While undertaking Supercars endurance duties in 2018, Muscat also signed on to drive in the Lamborghini Super Trofeo Asia with Leipert Motorsport, co-driving with countryman, Ben Gersekowski. The pair enjoyed a successful campaign, regularly finishing on the podium and finishing fifth in the Pro standings. The following year, Muscat would return to the category with the GDL Racing Team, co-driving with Daniel Stutterd, in the Pro-Am category.

In 2020, Muscat drove in the 2020 Dubai 24 Hour race aboard a Porsche 991 Cup car with JFC / LB Living Racing alongside Stutterd, Sam Fillmore and Andrew Fawcet. As of 2026, this remains his last professional motor racing appearance.

=== Supercars career ===
In 2016, Muscat would sign with Garry Rogers Motorsport to race in the Supercars Dunlop Series with the aim of adapting to the notoriously difficult category. He would finish eighth overall for the season with a best result of second coming at Sandown Raceway.

The following year, Muscat would return to the series for a second campaign. As well as this, he would be signed on as an endurance driver for Garry Rogers Motorsport in the Supercars Championship, driving alongside James Moffat. In the Dunlop Series, Muscat struggled for consistency and endured finished tenth in the driver standings with only one podium to his credit. His Supercars endurance events with Moffat bore little more fruit. After completing two practice sessions at Winton and Queensland, the pairing finished a commendable seventh in the Sandown 500. In what was an eventful Bathurst 1000, Muscat and Moffat found themselves third on the road with 22 laps to go despite numerous excursions. However, Moffat crashed heavily into the wall at McPhillamy Park, ending their race.

Muscat would be retained by Garry Rogers Motorsport for the 2018 endurance events alongside James Golding. He would return for the 2019 season, again with Golding. However, with the exit of Garry Rogers Motorsport from the category and few options available elsewhere, Muscat's career in the Supercars category came to an abrupt end.

== Personal life ==
Muscat works as a concreter for his family business, Muscrete Constructions.

== Racing record ==
=== Career summary ===
Season	Series	Team	Races	Wins	Poles	F. Laps	Podiums	Points	Position
2012	Victorian Porsche 944 Challenge		?	13	5	?	?	?	1st
2013	Porsche GT3 Cup Challenge Australia	Genis Steel	18	13	5	16	16	488	1st
2013	Australian Carrera Cup Championship	Steven Richards Motorsport	5	0	0	0	1	139	24th
2014	Australian GT Championship	Erebus Motorsport	13	7	2	8	12	595	1st
2014	Porsche Carrera Cup Great Britain	Redline Racing	2	0	0	0	2	0	-
2015	Australian Carrera Cup Championship	Team BRM	21	0	0	1	5	754	6th
2016	Supercars Dunlop Series	Garry Rogers Motorsport	16	0	0	1	1	1124	8th
2017	Supercars Dunlop Series	Garry Rogers Motorsport	21	0	0	1	1	1038	10th
2017	Supercars Championship	Garry Rogers Motorsport	5	0	0	0	0	291	50th
2018	Supercars Championship	Garry Rogers Motorsport	4	0	0	0	0	315	39th
2018	Lamborghini Super Trofeo Asia - Pro	Leipert Motorsport	10	1	3	1	7	92	5th
2019	Supercars Championship	Garry Rogers Motorsport	5	0	0	0	0	229	49th
2019	Lamborghini Super Trofeo Asia - Pro-Am	GDL Racing Team	8	0	0	1	4	70	4th
2020	24H GT Series	JFC / LB Living Racing	1	0	0	0	0	12	11th

=== Super2 Series results ===
Super2 Series results
Year	Team	No.	Car	1	2	3	4	5	6	7	8	9	10	11	12	13	14	15	16	17	18	19	20	21	Position	Points
2016	Garry Rogers Motorsport	44	Holden VF Commodore	ADE; R1; 5	ADE; R2; Ret	PHI; R3; 6	PHI; R4; 25	PHI; R5; 18	BAR; R6; 13	BAR; R7; 12	BAR; R8; 9	TOW; R9; 5	TOW; R10; DSQ	SAN; R11; 2	SAN; R12; 7	SAN; R13; 7	BAT; R14; 4	SYD; R15; 10	SYD; R16; 7						8th	1124
2017	Garry Rogers Motorsport	44	Holden VF Commodore	ADE; R1; 6	ADE; R2; Ret	ADE; R3; Ret	SYM; R4; 20	SYM; R5; 10	SYM; R6; 6	SYM; R7; 12	PHI; R8; 8	PHI; R9; 7	PHI; R10; 5	PHI; R11; 8	TOW; R12; 3	TOW; R13; 17	SMP; R14; 11	SMP; R15; 8	SMP; R16; 7	SMP; R17; 20	SAN; R18; 6	SAN; R19; Ret	NEW; R20; 11	NEW; R21; 4	10th	1038

=== Supercars Championship results ===
Supercars results
Year	Team	No.	Car	1	2	3	4	5	6	7	8	9	10	11	12	13	14	15	16	17	18	19	20	21	22	23	24	25	26	27	28	29	30	31	32	Position	Points
2017	Garry Rogers Motorsport	34	Holden VF Commodore	ADE; R1	ADE; R2	SYM; R3	SYM; R4	PHI; R5	PHI; R6	BAR; R7	BAR; R8	WIN; R9; PO	WIN; R10; PO	HID; R11	HID; R12	TOW; R13	TOW; R14	QLD; R15; PO	QLD; R16; PO	SMP; R17	SMP; R18	SAN; QR; 17	SAN; R19; 7	BAT; R20; Ret	SUR; R21; 18	SUR; R22; 19	PUK; R23	PUK; R24	NEW; R25	NEW; R26						50th	291
2018	Garry Rogers Motorsport	34	Holden ZB Commodore	ADE; R1	ADE; R2	MEL; R3	MEL; R4	MEL; R5	MEL; R6	SYM; R7	SYM; R8	PHI; R9	PHI; R10	BAR; R11	BAR; R12	WIN; R13; PO	WIN; R14; PO	HID; R15	HID; R16	TOW; R17	TOW; R18	QLD; R19	QLD; R20	SMP; R21	BEN; R22	BEN; R23	SAN; QR; 23	SAN; R24; 18	BAT; R25; 8	SUR; R26; 24	SUR; R27; C	PUK; R28	PUK; R29	NEW; R30	NEW; R31	39th	315
2019	Garry Rogers Motorsport	34	Holden ZB Commodore	ADE; R1	ADE; R2	MEL; R3	MEL; R4	MEL; R5	MEL; R6	SYM; R7	SYM; R8	PHI; R9	PHI; R10	BAR; R11	BAR; R12	WIN; R13	WIN; R14	HID; R15	HID; R16	TOW; R17	TOW; R18	QLD; R19	QLD; R20	BEN; R21	BEN; R22	PUK; R23	PUK; R24	BAT; R25; 11	SUR; R26; 16	SUR; R27; Ret	SAN; QR; 9	SAN; R28; Ret	NEW; R29	NEW; R30		49th	229

=== Bathurst 1000 results ===
Year	Team	Car	Co-driver	Position	Laps
2017	Garry Rogers Motorsport	Holden Commodore VF	(Australia) James Moffat	DNF	141
2018	Garry Rogers Motorsport	Holden Commodore ZB	(Australia) James Golding	8th	161
2019	Garry Rogers Motorsport	Holden Commodore ZB	(Australia) James Golding	11th	161

Sporting positions
Preceded by Klark Quinn	Australian GT; Champion; 2014	Succeeded by Christopher Mies
