= 2017 Wilson Security Sandown 500 =

Australian motor racing event

(Victoria (state)) 2017 Wilson Security Sandown 500
Event Information
- Round 10 of 14 in the 2017 International V8 Supercars Championship
- Date: 15–17 September 2017
- Location: Melbourne, Victoria
- Venue: Sandown Raceway
- Weather: Friday: Showers; Saturday: Clearing; Sunday: Fine

Results
Race 1
Distance	125 laps	388 km
Pole position	Cam Waters (New Zealand) Richie Stanaway; Prodrive Racing Australia	
Winner	Cam Waters (New Zealand) Richie Stanaway; Prodrive Racing Australia	3:31:35.7850

The 2017 Wilson Security Sandown 500 was a motor racing event for Supercars, held from 15 to 17 September 2017 at Sandown Raceway in Melbourne, Victoria. It consisted of one race, scheduled for 499.744 kilometres in length (161 laps), it was shortened to 388 kilometres in length because of a time limit (4:48 p.m. local time) imposed by Supercars. It was the tenth event of fourteen in the 2017 Supercars Championship and hosted Race 19 of the season. It was also the first event of the 2017 Enduro Cup.

== Background ==
The event was the 47th running of the Sandown 500, which was first held in 1964 as a six-hour race for series production touring cars. It was the thirteenth time the race had been held as part of the Supercars Championship and the fifth time it formed part of the Enduro Cup. The defending winners of the race were Garth Tander and Warren Luff.

The event was promoted as a "retro round", with teams encouraged to use adaptations of Australian touring car liveries from the 1960s, 1970s and 1980s, although some teams extended beyond these parameters when devising a livery, using sponsors and manufacturer heritage.

The following cars carried a retro livery during the event:

Vehicle		Notes
Walkinshaw Racing	02	Holden Racing Team livery used by Peter Brock and the team in the 1994 Australian Touring Car Championship.
Walkinshaw Racing	22	HSV Dealer Team livery used by Garth Tander to win the 2007 V8 Supercar Championship Series.
Lucas Dumbrell Motorsport	3	1990s-era retro livery featuring the original logo of primary sponsor, Plus Fitness, when the business was launched in 1996.
Lucas Dumbrell Motorsport	62	1970s-era retro livery featuring the original logo of primary sponsor, Phil Munday's Panel Works, when the business was launched in 1977.
Tim Blanchard Racing	4	Neptune Racing Team livery used by Norm Beechey to win the 1965 Australian Touring Car Championship.
Nissan Motorsport	7	Brock Racing Enterprises livery used by John Morton (No. 15) and Bobby Allison (No. 7) in winning the 1970 and 1971 SCCA C Production National Championship and the 1971 and 1972 Under 2.5 Litres Trans-Am Championship.
Nissan Motorsport	15	Brock Racing Enterprises livery used by John Morton (No. 15) and Bobby Allison (No. 7) in winning the 1970 and 1971 SCCA C Production National Championship and the 1971 and 1972 Under 2.5 Litres Trans-Am Championship.
Nissan Motorsport	23	Calsonic Team Impul livery used by Kazuyoshi Hoshino and his team to win the 1990 and 1993 Japanese Touring Car Championship.
Nissan Motorsport	78	Nissan test livery used by Tatsu Yokoyama to set seven new international speed records at Yatabe Test Track in 1967.
Brad Jones Racing	8	Tridents Racing Team livery used by Norm Beechey in the 1967 Australian Touring Car Championship.
Brad Jones Racing	75	Shell Racing Team livery used by Norm Beechey to win the 1970 Australian Touring Car Championship.
Erebus Motorsport	9	Team Brock livery used by Peter Brock to win the 1976 Sandown 400.
Erebus Motorsport	99	GB Galvanizing livery used by Jimmy Ellis in the 1998-99 Australian NASCAR Championship.
DJR Team Penske	12	Regular 2017 livery with retro Shell logos to commemorate their 50 year association with Dick Johnson which began in 1967.
DJR Team Penske	17	Regular 2017 livery with retro Shell logos to commemorate their 50 year association with Dick Johnson which began in 1967.
Team 18	18	Split livery featuring their regular 2017 livery on one side and a retro livery featuring retro logos of their sponsors on the other which include their primary sponsor, Preston Hire, which was known as Preston Erection from 1969 to 2001.
Garry Rogers Motorsport	33	Valvoline livery used by Garth Tander and the team in the 1998 Australian Touring Car Championship.
Garry Rogers Motorsport	34	Rothmans livery used by Allan Moffat and John Harvey in the 1987 World Touring Car Championship.
Tickford Racing	55	Supercheap Auto livery used by John Briggs in the 1999 Shell Championship Series.
Triple Eight Race Engineering	88	Holden livery used by the Holden Dealer Team in the late 1960s and early 1970s.
Triple Eight Race Engineering	97	Holden livery used by the Holden Dealer Team in the late 1960s and early 1970s.
Triple Eight Race Engineering	888	Caltex Colin Bond Racing livery used by Colin Bond and his team in the 1989 and 1990 Australian Touring Car Championship.

== Results ==
=== Race ===
Pos.	No.	Driver	Team	Car	Laps	Time/Retired	Grid	Points
1	6	(Australia) Cam Waters (New Zealand) Richie Stanaway	Prodrive Racing Australia	Ford FG X Falcon	125	3:31:35.7850	1	300
2	17	(New Zealand) Scott McLaughlin (France) Alexandre Prémat	DJR Team Penske	Ford FG X Falcon	125	+0.675	2	276
3	55	(Australia) Chaz Mostert (Australia) Steve Owen	Rod Nash Racing	Ford FG X Falcon	125	+22.575	5	258
4	33	(Australia) Garth Tander (Australia) James Golding	Garry Rogers Motorsport	Holden VF Commodore	125	+27.168	8	240
5	12	(New Zealand) Fabian Coulthard (Australia) Tony D'Alberto	DJR Team Penske	Ford FG X Falcon	125	+27.720	6	222
6	88	(Australia) Jamie Whincup (Australia) Paul Dumbrell	Triple Eight Race Engineering	Holden VF Commodore	125	+36.396	4	204
7	34	(Australia) James Moffat (Australia) Richard Muscat	Garry Rogers Motorsport	Holden VF Commodore	125	+37.339	16	192
8	18	(Australia) Lee Holdsworth (Australia) Karl Reindler	Team 18	Holden VF Commodore	125	+38.776	12	180
9	5	(Australia) Mark Winterbottom (Australia) Dean Canto	Prodrive Racing Australia	Ford FG X Falcon	125	+43.940	9	168
10	22	(Australia) James Courtney (Australia) Jack Perkins	Walkinshaw Racing	Holden VF Commodore	125	+47.230	14	156
11	888	(Australia) Craig Lowndes (New Zealand) Steven Richards	Triple Eight Race Engineering	Holden VF Commodore	125	+57.638	24	144
12	19	(Australia) Will Davison (Australia) Jonathon Webb	Tekno Autosports	Holden VF Commodore	125	+1:09.604	25	138
13	99	(Australia) Dale Wood (New Zealand) Chris Pither	Erebus Motorsport	Holden VF Commodore	124	+1 lap	7	132
14	15	(Australia) Rick Kelly (Australia) David Wall	Nissan Motorsport	Nissan L33 Altima	124	+1 lap	13	126
15	97	(New Zealand) Shane van Gisbergen (Australia) Matthew Campbell	Triple Eight Race Engineering	Holden VF Commodore	124	+1 lap	21	120
16	7	(Australia) Todd Kelly (Australia) Jack Le Brocq	Nissan Motorsport	Nissan L33 Altima	124	+1 lap	18	108
17	9	(Australia) David Reynolds (Australia) Luke Youlden	Erebus Motorsport	Holden VF Commodore	124	+1 lap	3	102
18	78	(Switzerland) Simona de Silvestro (Australia) David Russell	Nissan Motorsport	Nissan L33 Altima	124	+1 lap	22	96
19	56	(Australia) Jason Bright (Australia) Garry Jacobson	Britek Motorsport	Ford FG X Falcon	124	+1 lap	23	114
20	23	(Australia) Michael Caruso (Australia) Dean Fiore	Nissan Motorsport	Nissan L33 Altima	123	+2 laps	11	90
21	02	(Australia) Scott Pye (Australia) Warren Luff	Walkinshaw Racing	Holden VF Commodore	113	+12 laps	15	84
22	8	(Australia) Nick Percat (Australia) Macauley Jones	Brad Jones Racing	Holden VF Commodore	109	+16 laps	10	78
Ret	62	(Australia) Alex Rullo (Australia) Alex Davison	Lucas Dumbrell Motorsport	Holden VF Commodore	43	Mechanical	20	
Ret	3	(Australia) Aaren Russell (Australia) Taz Douglas	Lucas Dumbrell Motorsport	Holden VF Commodore	1	Accident	19	
DSQ	75	(Australia) Tim Slade (Australia) Ashley Walsh	Brad Jones Racing	Holden VF Commodore	125	Driving Time	17	
DNS	4	(Australia) Tim Blanchard (Australia) Todd Hazelwood	Tim Blanchard Racing	Holden VF Commodore				
