= Matt Campbell (racing driver) =

Australian race car driver (born 1995)

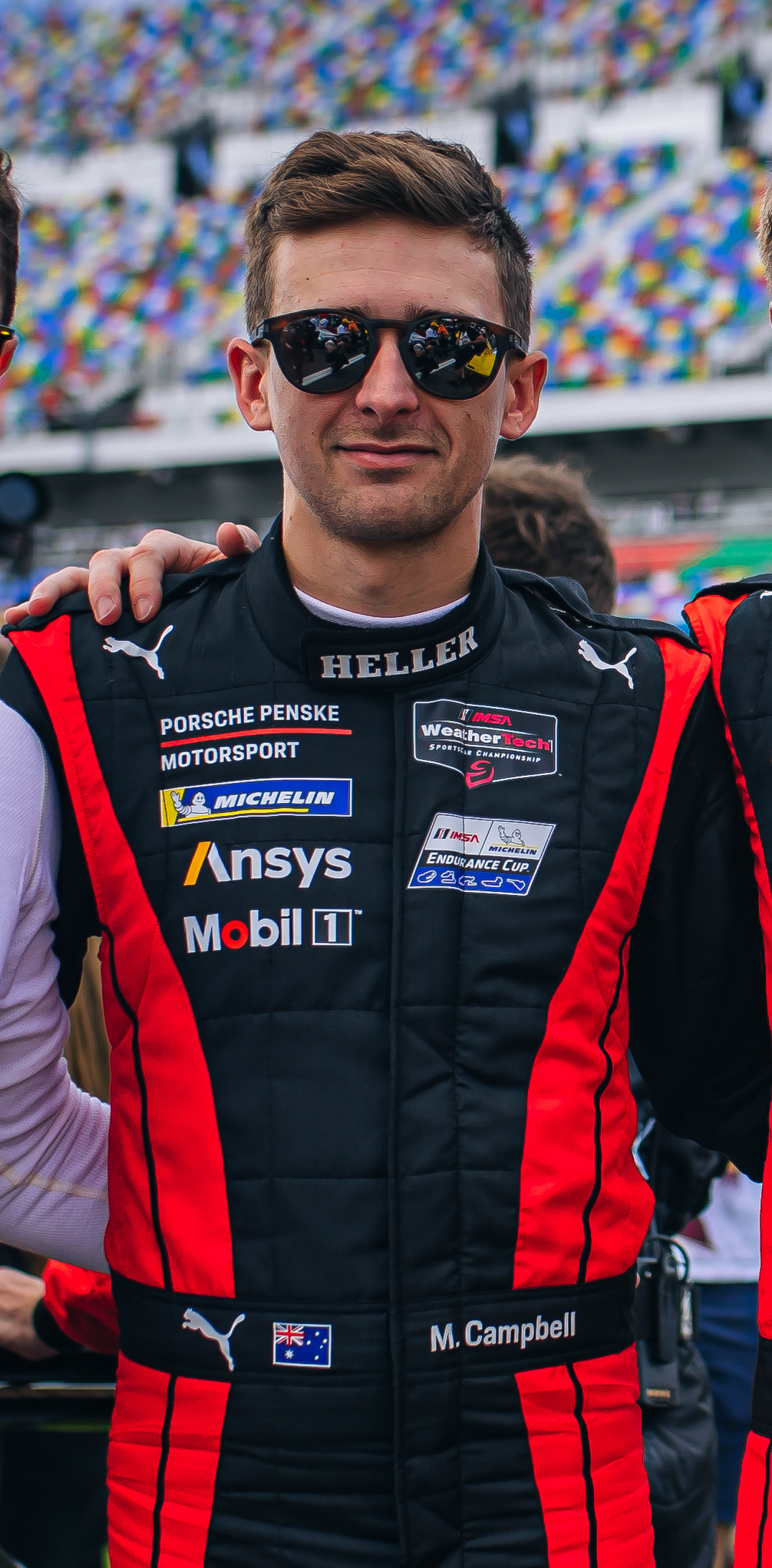
- Campbell at the 2024 24 Hours of Daytona.
- Nationality: Australian
- Born: 17 February 1995 (age 31) Warwick, Queensland, Australia

WEC career
- Debut season: 2018–19
- Current team: Porsche Penske Motorsport
- Categorisation: FIA Silver (until 2017); FIA Gold (2018–2022); FIA Platinum (2023–)
- Car number: 6
- Former teams: Dempsey-Proton Racing
- Starts: 33
- Wins: 6
- Poles: 6
- Fastest laps: 5
- Best finish: 2nd in 2018-19

Previous series
- 2019 2017 2017 2016-17, 2021-2022 2015-16 2014-15 2014 2012-13 2011-12: Intercontinental GT Challenge; Porsche Supercup; Carrera Cup Germany; Supercars Carrera Cup Australia; Australian GT Championship; Porsche GT3 Challenge Aus; Australian Formula Ford; Queensland Formula Ford

Championship titles
- 2025 2022 2016 2012: IMSA SportsCar Championship; IMSA SportsCar GTD Pro; Carrera Cup Australia; Queensland Formula Ford
Medal record
GT3
Representing Australia
FIA Motorsport Games
Gold medal – first place	2022 Le Castellet	GT Sprint

Matt Campbell (born 17 February 1995) is an Australian racing car driver, specialising in sports car racing. He is a Porsche factory driver, having formerly been a junior then young professional. Campbell won the 2022 IMSA SportsCar Championship in the GTD Pro class (with Jaminet) and is now a full-time driver of the No. 5 Porsche 963 for Porsche Penske Motorsport in the World Endurance Championship in the Hypercar class. Campbell won the 2016 Porsche Carrera Cup Australia driving for McElrea Racing. Campbell moved to Germany in 2017 and was third in the 2017 Porsche Supercup. He has a victory in the LMGTE Am Class at the 2018 24 Hours of Le Mans. Campbell also won overall the Bathurst 12 Hour in 2019 and 2024, driving a Porsche 911 GT3 R for Earl Bamber Motorsport and Manthey Racing respectively.

== Racing career ==
=== Early career ===
When Campbell was 14, he got a Datsun 1200 coupe, he raced with that with the support of his mother. Campbell's grandfather Bill and aunt Teresa are both racing drivers, Bill managed Morgan Park Raceway in the family's home town of Warwick for many years until his death in 2015. Matt then got some driver coaching and entered the Queensland and Australian Formula Ford Series racing with Synergy Motorsport in the national series.

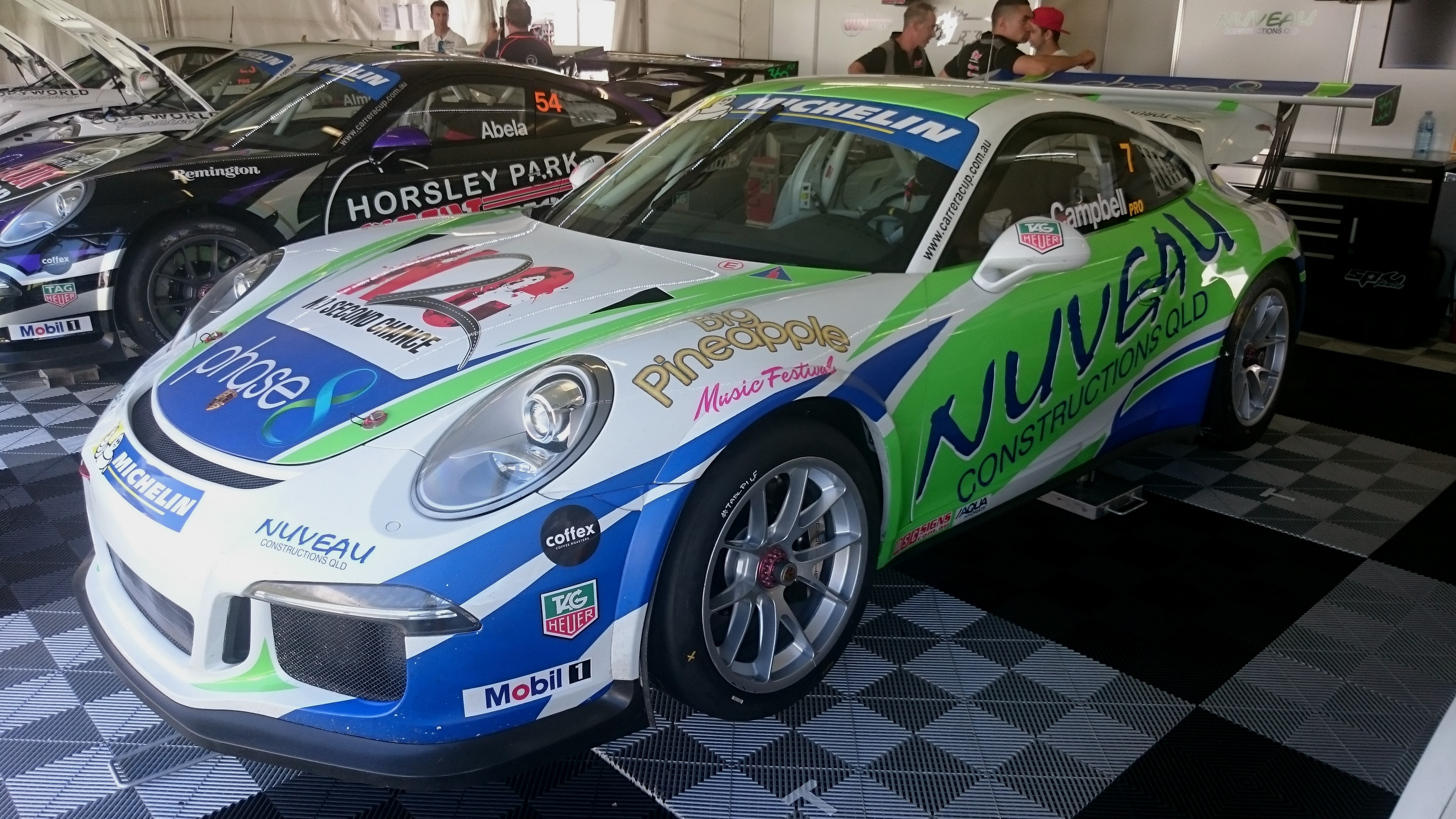
Campbell won the 2016 Porsche Carrera Cup Australia series driving for McElrea Racing

=== GT Racing ===
In 2014, Campbell competed in the Porsche GT3 Cup Challenge Australia dominating the B class championship. He moved up to the Porsche Carrera Cup Australia Championship in 2015, finishing third in the series, and then won the 2016 series.

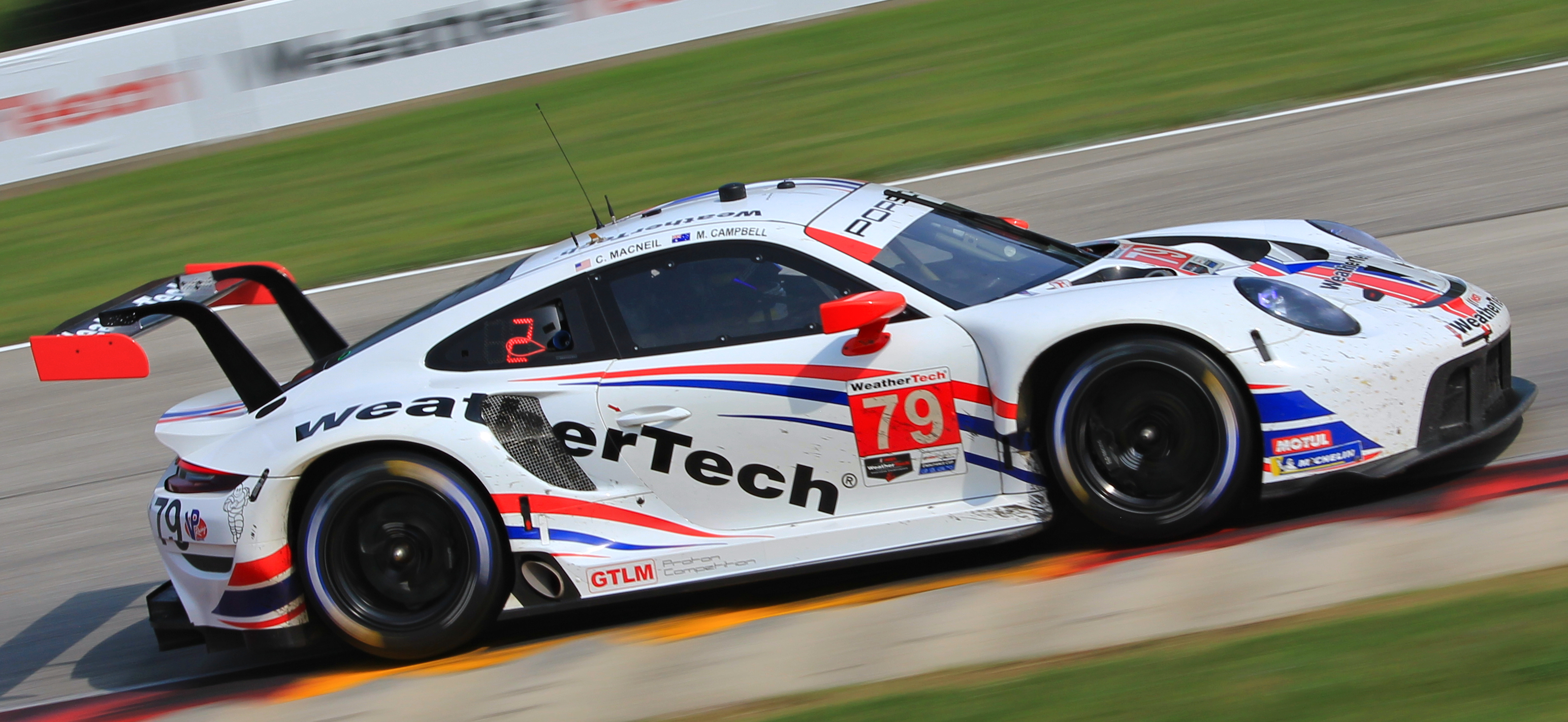
Campbell won at Road America during the 2021 IMSA SportsCar Championship.

In 2017, Campbell relocated to Germany and he drove for Fach Auto Tech in the Porsche Supercup, finishing third overall. This led to a drive for Dempsey-Proton Racing in the LMGTE Am class of the 2018–19 FIA World Endurance Championship. He won the class at the second round of the series, the 2018 24 Hours of Le Mans, driving with Christian Ried and Julien Andlauer. The same driver combination also took victory in the third round, the 2018 6 Hours of Silverstone. Campbell and Andlauer would finish second in the LMGTE Am championship after receiving a points penalty for a software issue that ultimately denied them a championship victory despite winning five of the eight rounds.

The 2019–20 season with Dempsey-Proton was disappointing ending eighth in the championship. Campbell also raced in GT3 around the world, for Rowe Racing in the 2019 Blancpain GT Series Endurance Cup in Europe and for Wright Motorsports in the 2019 Blancpain GT World Challenge America making top five finishes in both series. The season highlight was his charge through the field in the final hour to win the 2019 Bathurst 12 Hour with Earl Bamber Motorsport. In 2020, outside of his Dempsey-Proton duties, Campbell was runner up in the Intercontinental GT Challenge racing with Mathieu Jaminet and Patrick Pilet, racing with the Absolute Racing and GPX Racing teams. He also raced with star Belgian GT3 team Manthey Racing in the Nürburgring Langstrecken Serie and with CORE Autosport in the IMSA Sportscar Championship.

The 2021 season saw Campbell link with Proton Competition's American campaign in the IMSA Sportscar Championship as a co-driver with Cooper MacNeil in the GTLM class, placing fourth in the series sharing victories three times. In the World Endurance Championship, Dempsey-Proton was the best of the Porsche teams in LMGTE Am and finished third in the championship with Christian Ried and Jaxon Evans after a pair of second places at the final two rounds. Another highlight was a come-from-behind victory in the 2021 Paul Ricard 1000km with GPX Racing.

Campbell and Jaminet dominated the 2022 IMSA Sportscar Championship in the GTD Pro class with Pfaff Motorsports, winning five of the ten races.

=== Supercars ===
Campbell made his Supercars debut for Nissan Motorsport in 2016, co-driving with Todd Kelly in the Pirtek Enduro Cup. In 2017, Campbell joined defending champion Shane van Gisbergen at Triple Eight Race Engineering and took fifth place at Bathurst, to date his best finish in the Bathurst 1000.

== Racing record ==
=== Career summary ===
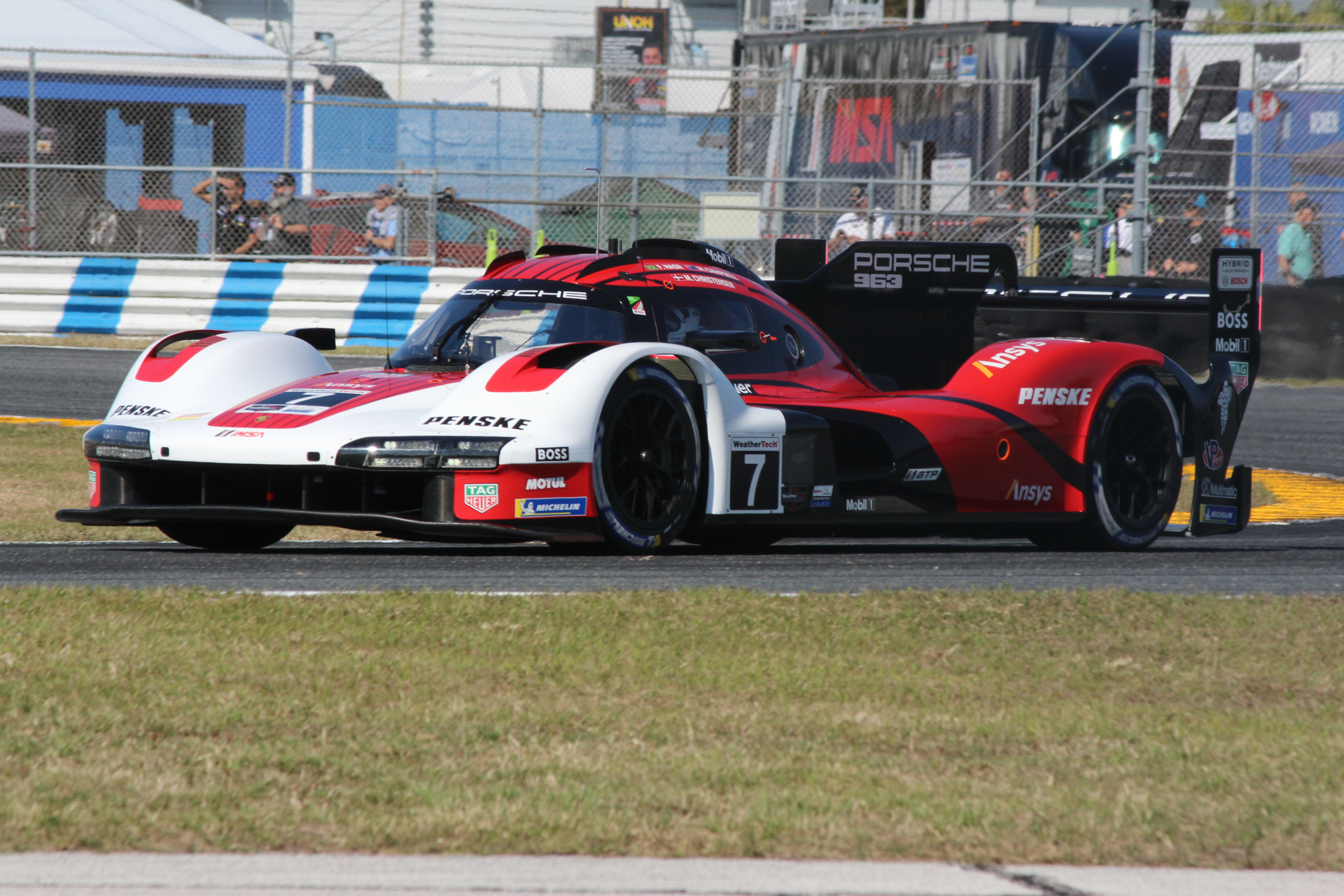
Campbell made his prototype debut at the 2023 24 Hours of Daytona.

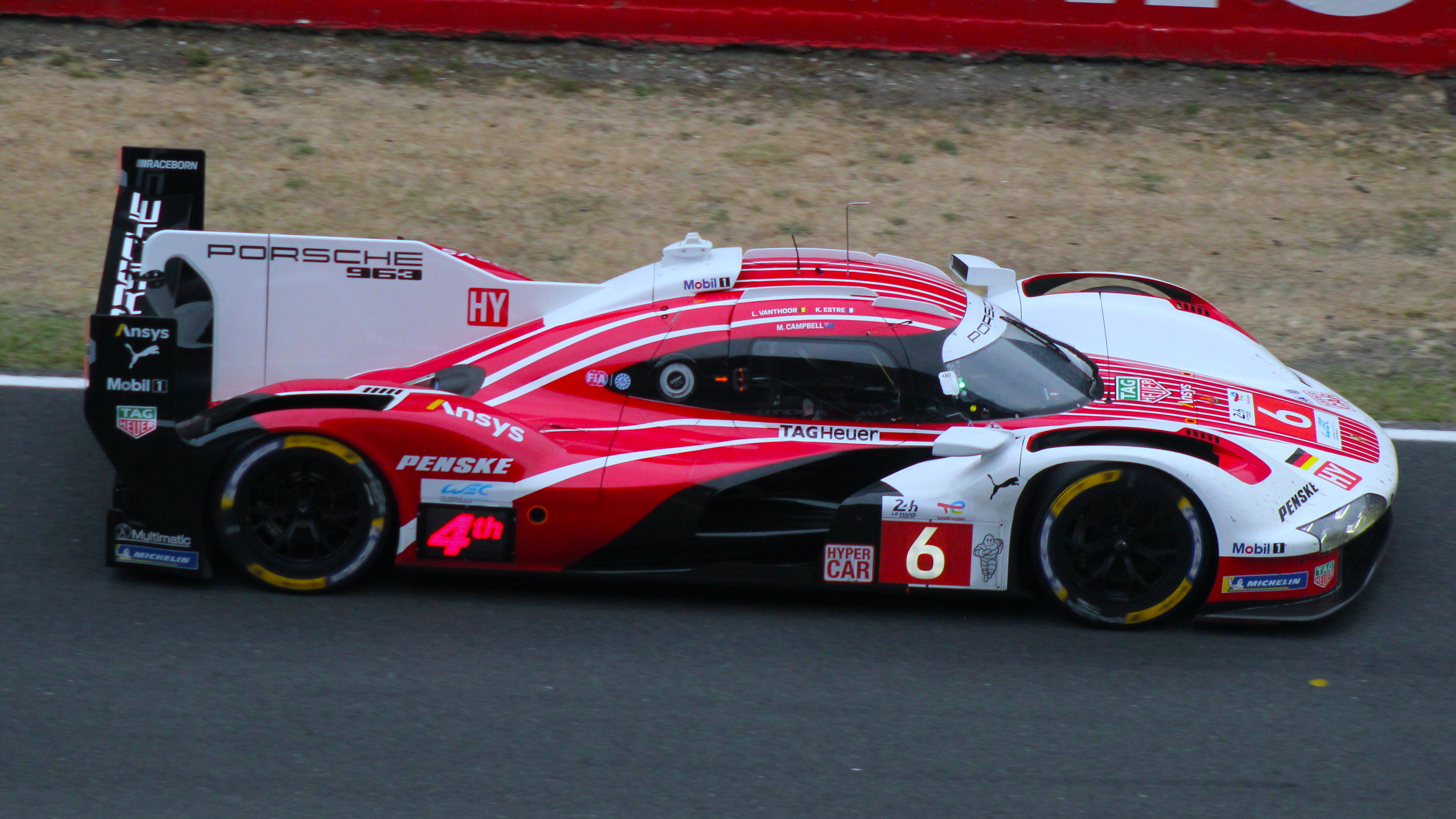
Campbell's No. 6 car at the 2025 24 Hours of Le Mans

Season	Series	Team	Races	Wins	Poles	F/laps	Podiums	Points	Position
2011	Queensland Formula Ford Championship	Greg Fahey Motorsport	12	0	1	1	6	147	**2nd**
2011	Queensland Race Car Series	Greg Fahey Motorsport	7	0	0	2	4	94	**3rd**
2012	Queensland Formula Ford Championship	Greg Fahey Motorsport	12	9	4	11	12	241	**1st**
2012	New South Wales Formula Ford Championship	Greg Fahey Motorsport	3	0	0	1	3	77	15th
2012	Australian Formula Ford Championship	Synergy Motorsport	9	0	0	0	0	41	12th
2013	Australian Formula Ford Championship	Synergy Motorsport	22	0	0	1	0	67	11th
2013	Queensland Sports Sedan and Invited Championship		2	0	0	0	0	18	20th
2013	Queensland Historic Touring Car Championship		4	0	0	1	0	47	19th
2014	Porsche GT3 Cup Challenge Australia	McElrea Racing	18	3	1	3	5	325	4th
2014	Australian GT Championship - GT Trophy	HHH Racing	6	0	0	0	1	236	8th
2014	Queensland Historic Touring Car Championship		8	0	0	1	1	103	10th
2015	Australian Carrera Cup Championship	McElrea Racing	22	6	2	5	10	860	**3rd**
2015	Australian GT Championship - GT Trophy	HHH Racing	4	0	0	1	0	3	51st
2015	Queensland Historic Touring Car Championship		6	0	0	0	0	60	13th
2016	Australian Carrera Cup Championship	McElrea Racing	24	14	7	8	18	1204.5	**1st**
2016	International V8 Supercars Championship	Nissan Motorsport Australia	4	0	0	1	0	324	43rd
2016	Queensland Historic Touring Car Championship		5	0	0	0	0	23	20th
2017	Porsche Supercup	Fach Auto Tech	11	4	5	1	5	151	**3rd**
2017	Porsche Carrera Cup Germany	Fach Auto Tech	2	1	1	1	2	-	N/A
2017	Supercars Championship	Triple Eight Race Engineering	4	0	0	0	0	591	30th
2017	Pirtek Enduro Cup	Triple Eight Race Engineering	4	0	0	0	0	591	4th
2018	Intercontinental GT Challenge	Competition Motorsports	1	0	0	0	0	12	18th
2018	24H GT Series - A6	Herberth Motorsport							
2018	24H GT Series - 911	Fach Auto Tech							
2018	24 Hours of Le Mans - LMGTE Am	Dempsey-Proton Racing	1	1	0	0	1	N/A	**1st**
2018	24 Hours of Nürburgring - SP9	Frikadelli Racing Team	1	0	0	0	0	N/A	10th
2018–19	FIA World Endurance Championship - LMGTE Am	Dempsey-Proton Racing	8	5	2	2	3	110	**2nd**
2019	Blancpain GT Series Endurance Cup	Rowe Racing	5	0	0	0	0	22	12th
2019	Blancpain GT World Challenge America	Wright Motorsports	8	0	1	1	0	46	14th
2019	Blancpain GT World Challenge America - Pro-Am	Wright Motorsports	8	0	2	4	7	111	7th
2019	IMSA SportsCar Championship - GTD	Wright Motorsports	1	0	0	1	0	85	30th
2019	IMSA SportsCar Championship - GTD	Park Place Motorsports	1	0	0	0	0	85	30th
2019	IMSA SportsCar Championship - GTD	Pfaff Motorsports	1	1	0	0	1	85	30th
2019	ADAC GT Masters	Frikadelli Racing Team	2	0	0	0	0	0	NC†
2019	ADAC GT Masters	SSR Performance	2	0	0	0	0	0	NC†
2019	Intercontinental GT Challenge	EBM	1	1	0	0	1	52	7th
2019	Intercontinental GT Challenge	Wright Motorsports	1	0	0	0	0	52	7th
2019	Intercontinental GT Challenge	Rowe Racing	1	0	0	0	0	52	7th
2019	Intercontinental GT Challenge	Absolute Racing	1	0	0	0	1	52	7th
2019	Intercontinental GT Challenge	Dinamic Motorsport	1	0	0	0	0	52	7th
2019	Queensland Historic Touring Car Championship		4	0	0	0	0	76	11th
2019	24 Hours of Le Mans - LMGTE Am	Dempsey-Proton Racing	1	0	0	0	0	N/A	4th
2019	24 Hours of Nürburgring - SP9	Frikadelli Racing Team	1	0	0	0	0	N/A	DNF
2019–20	FIA World Endurance Championship - LMGTE Am	Dempsey-Proton Racing	7	0	2	1	2	98.5	8th
2020	GT World Challenge Europe Endurance Cup	GPX Racing	4	0	0	0	2	65	**2nd**
2020	IMSA SportsCar Championship - GTLM	Porsche GT Team	2	1	1	0	2	65	11th
2020	Intercontinental GT Challenge	Absolute Racing	1	0	1	0	1	45	**2nd**
2020	Intercontinental GT Challenge	GPX Racing	2	0	0	1	2	45	**2nd**
2021	FIA World Endurance Championship - LMGTE Am	Dempsey-Proton Racing	6	0	0	1	2	79	**3rd**
2021	24 Hours of Le Mans - LMGTE Am	Dempsey-Proton Racing	1	0	0	0	0	N/A	5th
2021	IMSA SportsCar Championship - GTD	Pfaff Motorsports	2	0	0	0	1	222	61st
2021	IMSA SportsCar Championship - GTLM	WeatherTech Racing	6	3	0	0	5	2084	4th
2021	European Le Mans Series - LMGTE	WeatherTech Racing	2	0	0	0	0	14	20th
2021	GT World Challenge Europe Endurance Cup	GPX Martini Racing	5	1	0	0	1	35	10th
2021	Intercontinental GT Challenge	GPX Martini Racing	1	0	0	0	0	0	NC
2021	Supercars Championship	Kelly Grove Racing	1	0	0	0	0	0	NC
2021	Historic Grand Prix of Monaco - Series F	Shadow Racing Cars	1	0	0	0	0	N/A	13th
2021	24 Hours of Nürburgring - SP9	Frikadelli Racing Team	1	0	0	0	0	N/A	DNF
2022	IMSA SportsCar Championship - GTD Pro	Pfaff Motorsports	10	5	3	1	8	3497	**1st**
2022	GT World Challenge Europe Endurance Cup	EMA Motorsport	1	0	0	0	0	2	33rd
2022	Supercars Championship	Grove Racing	1	0	0	0	0	0	NC
2022	24 Hours of Le Mans - LMGTE Am	Proton Competition	1	0	0	0	0	N/A	16th
2022	FIA Motorsport Games GT Sprint	Team Australia	1	1	0	0	1	N/A	**1st**
2022	24 Hours of Nürburgring - SP9	Toksport WRT	1	0	0	0	0	N/A	DNF
2023	IMSA SportsCar Championship - GTP	Porsche Penske Motorsport	9	1	2	1	3	2691	5th
2023	24 Hours of Le Mans - Hypercar	Porsche Penske Motorsport	Reserve driver						
2023	Intercontinental GT Challenge	Manthey EMA	1	0	0	0	1	18	19th
2023	GT World Challenge Australia - Pro-Am	EMA Motorsport							
2023	24 Hours of Nürburgring - SP9	Lionspeed by Car Collection Motorsport	1	0	0	0	0	N/A	DNF
2024	FIA World Endurance Championship - Hypercar	Porsche Penske Motorsport	8	0	2	1	4	104	5th
2024	IMSA SportsCar Championship - GTP	Porsche Penske Motorsport	3	1	0	0	3	1038	15th
2024	Intercontinental GT Challenge	Manthey EMA							
2024	Intercontinental GT Challenge	Herberth Motorsport							
2024	GT World Challenge Europe Endurance Cup	SSR Herberth	1	0	0	0	0	4	28th
2024	24 Hours of Nürburgring - SP9	Herberth Motorsport	1	0	0	0	0	N/A	16th
2025	IMSA SportsCar Championship - GTP	Porsche Penske Motorsport	9	1	0	2	6	2907	**1st**
2025	FIA World Endurance Championship - Hypercar	Porsche Penske Motorsport	5	1	0	0	2	65	8th
2025	GT World Challenge Europe Endurance Cup	Dinamic GT	1	0	0	0	0	0	NC
2026	IMSA SportsCar Championship - GTP	Porsche Penske Motorsport	3	1	0	1	2	1030	17th
2026	Nürburgring Langstrecken-Serie - SP9	Manthey Racing EMA							
2026	GT World Challenge Europe Endurance Cup	Schumacher CLRT	1	0	0	0	0	12	21st

^{†} As Campbell was a guest driver, he was ineligible to score points. ^{*} Season still in progress.

=== Complete Bathurst 12 Hour results ===
Year	Team	Co-drivers	Car	Class	Laps	Pos.	Class pos.
2014	(Australia) Fiat Abarth Motorsport	(Australia) Matt Cherry (Australia) Luke Ellery	Fiat Abarth 500	F	10	28th	**3rd**
2015	(Australia) Amac Motorsport	(Australia) Andrew Macpherson (Australia) Bradley Shiels	Porsche 997 GT3-R	AA	41	DNF	DNF
2016	(Australia) Objective Racing	(Australia) Warren Luff (Australia) Tim Slade (Australia) Tony Walls	McLaren 650S GT3	AA	49	DNF	DNF
2017	(United States) Competition Motorsports	(Australia) David Calvert-Jones (United States) Patrick Long (Germany) Marc Lieb	Porsche 911 GT3 R	APA	289	**2nd**	**1st**
2018	(United States) Competition Motorsports	(Australia) David Calvert-Jones (United States) Patrick Long (Australia) Alex Davison	Porsche 911 GT3 R	APA	271	4th	**2nd**
2019	(New Zealand) Earl Bamber Motorsport	(Norway) Dennis Olsen (Germany) Dirk Werner	Porsche 911 GT3 R	APP	312	**1st**	**1st**
2020	(China) Absolute Racing	(France) Mathieu Jaminet (France) Patrick Pilet	Porsche 911 GT3 R	Pro	312	4th	4th
2023	(Germany) Manthey Racing / (Australia) EMA Motorsport	(France) Mathieu Jaminet (Austria) Thomas Preining	Porsche 911 GT3 R	Pro	323	**2nd**	**2nd**
2024	(Germany) Manthey Racing / (Australia) EMA Motorsport	(Turkey) Ayhancan Güven (Belgium) Laurens Vanthoor	Porsche 911 GT3 R (992)	Pro	275	**1st**	**1st**
2025	(China) Absolute Racing	(Turkey) Ayhancan Güven (Belgium) Alessio Picariello	Porsche 911 GT3 R (992)	Pro	306	6th	6th
2026	(Hong Kong) Absolute Racing	(Denmark) Bastian Buus (Belgium) Alessio Picariello	Porsche 911 GT3 R (992)	Pro	262	6th	4th

=== Supercars Championship results ===
Supercars results
Year	Team	No.	Car	1	2	3	4	5	6	7	8	9	10	11	12	13	14	15	16	17	18	19	20	21	22	23	24	25	26	27	28	29	30	31	32	33	34	Pos.	Pts	Ref
2016	Nissan Motorsport	7	Nissan Altima L33	ADE; R1	ADE; R2	ADE; R3	SYM; R4	SYM; R5	PHI; R6	PHI; R7	BAR; R8	BAR; R9	WIN; R10; PO	WIN; R11; PO	HID; R12	HID; R13	TOW; R14	TOW; R15	QLD; R16; PO	QLD; R17; PO	SMP; R18	SMP; R19	SAN; QR; 21	SAN; R20; 7	BAT; R21; Ret	SUR; R22; 8	SUR; R23; 21	PUK; R24	PUK; R25	PUK; R26	PUK; R27	SYD; R28	SYD; R29					43rd	324	
2017	Triple Eight Race Engineering	97	Holden VF Commodore	ADE; R1	ADE; R2	SYM; R3	SYM; R4	PHI; R5	PHI; R6	BAR; R7	BAR; R8	WIN; R9	WIN; R10	HID; R11	HID; R12	TOW; R13	TOW; R14	QLD; R15	QLD; R16	SMP; R17	SMP; R18	SAN; QR; 25	SAN; R19; 15	BAT; R20; 5	SUR; R21; 4	SUR; R22; 3	PUK; R23	PUK; R24	NEW; R25	NEW; R26								30th	591	
2021	Kelly Grove Racing	7	Ford Mustang S550	BAT1; R1	BAT1; R2	SAN; R3	SAN; R4	SAN; R5	SYM; R6	SYM; R7	SYM; R8	BEN; R9	BEN; R10	BEN; R11	HID; R12	HID; R13	HID; R14	TOW1; R15	TOW1; R16	TOW2; R17	TOW2; R18	TOW2; R19	SMP1; R20	SMP1; R21	SMP1; R22	SMP2; R23	SMP2; R24	SMP2; R25	SMP3; R26	SMP3; R27	SMP3; R28	SMP4; R29; PO	SMP4; R30; PO	BAT2; R31; NC				45th	0	
2022	Grove Racing	26	Ford Mustang S550	SMP; R1	SMP; R2	SYM; R3	SYM; R4	SYM; R5	MEL; R6	MEL; R7	MEL; R8	MEL; R9	BAR; R10	BAR; R11	BAR; R12	WIN; R13	WIN; R14	WIN; R15	HID; R16	HID; R17	HID; R18	TOW; R19	TOW; R20	BEN; R21	BEN; R22	BEN; R23	SAN; R24	SAN; R25	SAN; R26	PUK; R27	PUK; R28	PUK; R29	BAT; R30; Ret	SUR; R31	SUR; R32	NEW; R33	NEW; R34	NC	0	

=== Bathurst 1000 results ===
Year	Team	Car	Co-driver	Position	Lap
2016	Nissan Motorsport	Nissan Altima L33	(Australia) Todd Kelly	DNF	157
2017	Triple Eight Race Engineering	Holden Commodore VF	(New Zealand) Shane van Gisbergen	5th	161
2021	Kelly Grove Racing	Ford Mustang Mk.6	(New Zealand) Andre Heimgartner	NC	159
2022	Grove Racing	Ford Mustang Mk.6	(Australia) David Reynolds	DNF	4

=== Complete Porsche Supercup results ===
(key) (Races in bold indicate pole position) (Races in italics indicate fastest lap)

Year	Team	1	2	3	4	5	6	7	8	9	10	11	DC	Points
2017	Fach Auto Tech	**CAT**; 5	**CAT**; 3	MON; 5	**RBR**; 1	SIL; 7	HUN; 16	SPA; 6	SPA; 5	**MNZ**; 1	MEX; 1	**MEX**; 1	3rd	151

=== Complete FIA World Endurance Championship results ===
(key) (Races in bold indicate pole position; races in italics indicate fastest lap)

Year	Entrant	Class	Chassis	Engine	1	2	3	4	5	6	7	8	Rank	Points
2018–19	Dempsey-Proton Racing	LMGTE Am	Porsche 911 RSR	Porsche 4.0 L Flat-6	**SPA**; 4	LMS; 1	SIL; 1	FUJ; DSQ	SHA; 1	**SEB**; 1	SPA; 1	LMS; 2	2nd	110^{1}
2019–20	Dempsey-Proton Racing	LMGTE Am	Porsche 911 RSR	Porsche 4.0 L Flat-6	SIL; 5	FUJ; 5	SHA; 11	BHR; 6	COA; 5	**SPA**; 2	**LMS**; 2	BHR	8th	98.5
2021	Dempsey-Proton Racing	LMGTE Am	Porsche 911 RSR-19	Porsche 4.2 L Flat-6	SPA; Ret	ALG; Ret	MNZ; 5	LMS; 4	BHR; 2	BHR; 2			3rd	79
2024	Porsche Penske Motorsport	Hypercar	Porsche 963	Porsche 4.6 L Turbo V8	**QAT**; 3	IMO; 3	**SPA**; Ret	LMS; 6	SÃO; 3	COA; 7	FUJ; Ret	BHR; 2	5th	104
2025	Porsche Penske Motorsport	Hypercar	Porsche 963	Porsche 4.6 L Turbo V8	QAT; 11	IMO; 8	SPA	LMS; 2	SÃO	COA; 1	FUJ	BHR; 13	8th	65

Notes

- **^1** – All points earned by the team prior to the Shanghai round were nullified.

=== Complete 24 Hours of Le Mans results ===
Year	Team	Co-drivers	Car	Class	Laps	Pos.	Class pos.
2018	(Germany) Dempsey-Proton Racing	(Germany) Christian Ried (France) Julien Andlauer	Porsche 911 RSR	GTE; Am	335	25th	**1st**
2019	(Germany) Dempsey-Proton Racing	(Germany) Christian Ried (France) Julien Andlauer	Porsche 911 RSR	GTE; Am	332	34th	4th
2020	(Germany) Dempsey-Proton Racing	(Germany) Christian Ried (Italy) Riccardo Pera	Porsche 911 RSR	GTE; Am	339	25th	**2nd**
2021	(Germany) Dempsey-Proton Racing	(Germany) Christian Ried (New Zealand) Jaxon Evans	Porsche 911 RSR-19	GTE; Am	335	31st	5th
2022	(Germany) Proton Racing	(Republic of Ireland) Michael Fassbender (Canada) Zacharie Robichon	Porsche 911 RSR-19	GTE; Am	329	51st	16th
2024	(Germany) Porsche Penske Motorsport	(Denmark) Michael Christensen (France) Frédéric Makowiecki	Porsche 963	Hypercar	311	6th	6th
2025	(Germany) Porsche Penske Motorsport	(France) Kévin Estre (Belgium) Laurens Vanthoor	Porsche 963	Hypercar	387	**2nd**	**2nd**

=== Complete 24 Hours of Nürburgring results ===
Year	Team	Co-Drivers	Car	Class	Laps	Pos.	Class Pos.
2018	(Germany) Frikadelli Racing Team	(Germany) Lance David Arnold (Germany) Wolf Henzler (Germany) Alex Müller	Porsche 911 GT3 R (991)	SP9	132	11th	10th
2019	(Germany) Frikadelli Racing Team	(France) Romain Dumas (France) Mathieu Jaminet (Germany) Sven Müller	Porsche 911 GT3 R (991.2)	SP9	134	DNF	DNF
2021	(Germany) Frikadelli Racing Team	(New Zealand) Earl Bamber (France) Mathieu Jaminet (United Kingdom) Nick Tandy	Porsche 911 GT3 R (991.2)	SP9	26	DNF	DNF
2022	(Germany) Toksport WRT	(France) Julien Andlauer (France) Mathieu Jaminet	Porsche 911 GT3 R (991.2)	SP9; Pro	18	DNF	DNF
2023	(Germany) Lionspeed by Car Collection Motorsport	(France) Mathieu Jaminet (Germany) Patrick Kolb (France) Patrick Pilet	Porsche 911 GT3 R (992)	SP9; Pro	16	DNF	DNF
2024	(Germany) Herberth Motorsport	(Germany) Vincent Kolb (Norway) Dennis Olsen (Germany) Robert Renauer	Porsche 911 GT3 R (992)	SP9; Pro	49	16th	13th

=== Complete 24 Hours of Spa results ===
Year	Team	Co-drivers	Car	Class	Laps	Pos.	Class pos.
2019	(Germany) Rowe Racing	(Norway) Dennis Olsen (Germany) Dirk Werner	Porsche 911 GT3 R (991.2)	Pro	362	7th	7th
2020	(United Arab Emirates) GPX Racing	(France) Mathieu Jaminet (France) Patrick Pilet	Porsche 911 GT3 R (991.2)	Pro	527	4th	4th
2021	(United Arab Emirates) GPX Martini Racing	(New Zealand) Earl Bamber (France) Mathieu Jaminet	Porsche 911 GT3 R (991.2)	Pro	246	NC	NC
2022	(Australia) EMA Motorsport	(France) Mathieu Jaminet (Brazil) Felipe Nasr	Porsche 911 GT3 R (991.2)	Pro	529	22nd	16th
2024	(Germany) SSR Herberth	(France) Mathieu Jaminet (France) Frédéric Makowiecki	Porsche 911 GT3 R (992)	Pro	478	8th	7th
2025	(Italy) Dinamic GT	(Denmark) Bastian Buus (France) Mathieu Jaminet	Porsche 911 GT3 R (992)	Pro	60	DNF	DNF

=== Complete IMSA SportsCar Championship results ===
(key) (Races in bold indicate pole position; races in italics indicate fastest lap)

Year	Entrant	Class	Make	Engine	1	2	3	4	5	6	7	8	9	10	11	12	Rank	Points	Ref
2019	Park Place Motorsports	GTD	Porsche 911 GT3 R	Porsche 4.0 L Flat-6	DAY; 7	SEB	MDO	DET	WGL	MOS							30th	85	
2019	Wright Motorsports	GTD	Porsche 911 GT3 R	Porsche 4.0 L Flat-6							LIM; 5						30th	85	
2019	Pfaff Motorsports	GTD	Porsche 911 GT3 R	Porsche 4.0 L Flat-6								ELK; 1	VIR	LGA	PET		30th	85	
2020	Porsche GT Team	GTLM	Porsche 911 RSR-19	Porsche 4.2 L Flat-6	**DAY**; 3	DAY	SEB	ELK	VIR	ATL	MDO	CLT	PET; 1	LGA	SEB		11th	65	
2021	Pfaff Motorsports	GTD	Porsche 911 GT3 R	Porsche 4.0 L Flat-6	DAY; 12		MDO										61st	222	
2021	WeatherTech Racing	GTLM	Porsche 911 RSR-19	Porsche 4.2 L Flat-6		SEB; 1		DET	WGL; 5	WGL; 3	LIM	ELK; 1	LGA; 3	LBH	VIR	PET; 1	4th	2084	
2022	Pfaff Motorsports	GTD Pro	Porsche 911 GT3 R	Porsche MA1.76/MDG.G 4.0 L Flat-6	DAY; 1	SEB; 5	LBH; 5	**LGA**; 1	WGL; 3	**MOS**; 1	**LIM**; 1	ELK; 2	VIR; 1	PET; 3			1st	3497	
2023	Porsche Penske Motorsport	GTP	Porsche 963	Porsche 9RD 4.6 L V8	DAY; 7	SEB; 5	LBH; 3	**LGA**; 9	WGL; 7	MOS; 6	ELK; 1	**IMS**; 2	PET; 4				5th	2691	
2024	Porsche Penske Motorsport	GTP	Porsche 963	Porsche 9RD 4.6 L V8	DAY; 1	SEB; 3	LBH	LGA	DET	WGL	ELK	IMS	PET; 3				15th	1038	
2025	Porsche Penske Motorsport	GTP	Porsche 963	Porsche 9RD 4.6 L V8	DAY; 3	SEB; 2	LBH; 2	LGA; 1	DET; 3	WGL; 4	ELK; 5	IMS; 7	PET; 3				1st	2907	
2026	Porsche Penske Motorsport	GTP	Porsche 963	Porsche 9RD 4.6 L V8	DAY; 4	SEB; 2	LBH	LGA	DET	WGL	ELK	IMS	PET; 1				17th	1030	

=== Complete European Le Mans Series results ===
(key) (Races in bold indicate pole position; results in italics indicate fastest lap)

Year	Entrant	Class	Chassis	Engine	1	2	3	4	5	6	Rank	Points
2021	WeatherTech Racing	LMGTE	Porsche 911 RSR-19	Porsche 4.2 L Flat-6	CAT	RBR; 6	LEC	MNZ	SPA; 7	ALG	20th	14

Sporting positions
Preceded by Nick Foster	Porsche Carrera Cup Australia; Champion; 2016	Succeeded by David Wall
Preceded by Robin Frijns; Stuart Leonard; Dries Vanthoor	Winner of the Bathurst 12 Hour; 2019; With: Dennis Olsen & Dirk Werner	Succeeded by Jules Gounon; Jordan Pepper; Maxime Soulet
Preceded by Antonio García; Jordan Taylor (GTLM)	IMSA SportsCar Championship; GTD Pro Champion; 2022; With: Mathieu Jaminet	Succeeded by Jack Hawksworth; Ben Barnicoat
Preceded by Jules Gounon; Kenny Habul; Luca Stolz	Winner of the Bathurst 12 Hour; 2024; With: Ayhancan Güven & Laurens Vanthoor	Succeeded by Augusto Farfus; Kelvin van der Linde; Sheldon van der Linde
Preceded by Felipe Nasr; Dane Cameron	IMSA SportsCar Championship; Champion; 2025; With: Mathieu Jaminet	Succeeded by Jack Aitken
Awards and achievements
Preceded by Daniel Ricciardo; 2014	Sir Jack Brabham Award; 2017	Succeeded by Will Power
Preceded by Raffaele Marciello	Allan Simonsen Trophy (Pole position Bathurst 12 Hour); 2020	Succeeded by Chaz Mostert
