= 2017 Porsche Carrera Cup Australia =

Australian motor racing competition

The 2017 Porsche Carrera Cup Australia was an Australian motor racing series for Porsche 911 GT3 Cup (Type 991) cars. It was sanctioned by the Confederation of Australian Motor Sport (CAMS) as a National Series with Porsche Cars Australia Pty Ltd appointed as the Category Manager. It was the 13th Carrera Cup to be contested in Australia in which the series was won by David Wall.

== Teams and drivers ==
Team	Class	Car#	Driver	Pro-am co-driver	Rounds
Grove Motorsport	Challenge	4^{a}	(Australia) Stephen Grove	(Australia) Tim Slade	All
Zagame Motorsport	Pro	5^{b}	(Australia) Cameron McConville	(Australia) Tony Bates	All
Zagame Motorsport	Pro	6	(Australia) Michael Almond		1–2, 4
McElrea Racing	Pro	7^{c}	(New Zealand) Jaxon Evans	(New Zealand) Tim Miles	All
McElrea Racing	Pro	33^{d}	(New Zealand) Simon Ellingham	(Australia) John Goodacre	All
McElrea Racing	Pro	54	(Australia) James Abela	(Australia) Anthony Gilbertson	1–3
McElrea Racing	Pro	136	(Australia) James Abela		4–8
Porsche Centre Melbourne	Pro	8^{e}	(Germany) Lars Kern		1–2, 5
Porsche Centre Melbourne	Challenge	8^{e}	(Australia) Dean Grant	(Australia) Lee Holdsworth	3
Porsche Centre Melbourne	Pro	8^{e}	(New Zealand) Daniel Gaunt		7
Porsche Centre Melbourne	Challenge	9^{f}	(Australia) Marc Cini	(Australia) Dean Fiore	1–3, 5–8
Porsche Centre Melbourne	Pro	23	(Australia) Brenton Grove		6, 8
Buik Motorsport	Challenge	13	(Australia) Sam Shahin	(New Zealand) Daniel Gaunt	3–4, 6–8
Buik Motorsport	Pro	26	(Australia) Michael Almond		6–8
Twigg Motorsport	Challenge	18	(Australia) Max Twigg		7–8
Garth Walden Racing	Challenge	21	(Australia) Rob Woods	(Australia) Duvashen Padayachee	3
Garth Walden Racing	Pro	29	(Australia) Garth Walden		8
DNA Racing	Challenge	22^{g}	(Australia) Dean Cook		2, 5–6, 8
DNA Racing	Challenge	131	(Australia) Graham Williams	(Australia) Nick Foster	2–3, 5–8
Motorsport Leasing	Challenge	34	(Australia) John Morriss		6
Wall Racing	Pro	38^{h}	(Australia) David Wall	(Australia) Shane Smollen	All
Wall Racing	Challenge	156	(Australia) Shane Smollen		5
STR Truck Radios	Challenge	48	(Australia) Matt Palmer		2
Miles Advisory Partners	Challenge	70^{i}	(New Zealand) Tim Miles		4–7
Sonic Motor Racing Services	Pro	77^{j}	(Australia) Nick McBride	(Australia) Dylan Thomas	All
Sonic Motor Racing Services	Pro	79	(Australia) Jordan Love		6–8
Sonic Motor Racing Services	Pro	777	(New Zealand) Andre Heimgartner	(Australia) Aaron Ireland	All
Ashley Seward Motorsport	Pro	88^{k}	(Australia) Dylan O'Keeffe	(Australia) Adam Gowans	All
Ashley Seward Motorsport	Pro	888	(Australia) Alex Davison	(Australia) Geoff Emery	All

Notes

- ^a — raced as number 104 at the Sepang Round and number 4 for all other rounds
- ^b — raced as number 105 at the Sepang Round and number 5 for all other rounds
- ^c — raced as number 107 at the Sepang Round and number 7 for all other rounds
- ^d — raced as number 133 at the Sepang Round and number 33 for all other rounds
- ^e — raced as number 108 at the Sepang Round and number 8 for all other rounds
- ^f — raced as number 109 at the Sepang Round and number 9 for all other rounds
- ^g — raced as number 122 at the Sepang Round and number 22 for all other rounds
- ^h — raced as number 138 at the Sepang Round and number 38 for all other rounds
- ^i — raced as number 170 at the Sepang Round and number 70 for all other rounds
- ^j — raced as number 177 at the Sepang Round and number 77 for all other rounds
- ^k — raced as number 188 at the Sepang Round and number 88 for all other rounds

== Race calendar ==
The series was contested over eight rounds with a joined round with Porsche Carrera Cup Asia at Sepang International Circuit in Malaysia.

Round		Circuit	City / state	Date	Pole position	Fastest lap	Winning driver	Winning team	Round winner
1	R1	(South Australia) Adelaide Street Circuit	Adelaide, South Australia	3 March	(New Zealand) Andre Heimgartner	(Germany) Lars Kern	(New Zealand) Andre Heimgartner	Sonic Motor Racing Services	(New Zealand) Andre Heimgartner
1	R2	(South Australia) Adelaide Street Circuit	Adelaide, South Australia	4 March		(New Zealand) Jaxon Evans	(Australia) David Wall	Wall Racing	(New Zealand) Andre Heimgartner
1	R3	(South Australia) Adelaide Street Circuit	Adelaide, South Australia	5 March		(Australia) David Wall	(New Zealand) Andre Heimgartner	Sonic Motor Racing Services	(New Zealand) Andre Heimgartner
2	R1	(Victoria (state)) Albert Park Grand Prix Circuit	Melbourne, Victoria	23 March	(Australia) Nick McBride	(Australia) Cameron McConville	(Australia) Nick McBride	Sonic Motor Racing Services	(Australia) Cameron McConville
2	R2	(Victoria (state)) Albert Park Grand Prix Circuit	Melbourne, Victoria	24 March		(Australia) Nick McBride	(Australia) Nick McBride	Sonic Motor Racing Services	(Australia) Cameron McConville
2	R3	(Victoria (state)) Albert Park Grand Prix Circuit	Melbourne, Victoria	25 March		(Australia) Alex Davison	(Australia) Cameron McConville	Zagame Motorsport	(Australia) Cameron McConville
2	R4	(Victoria (state)) Albert Park Grand Prix Circuit	Melbourne, Victoria	26 March		(Australia) Alex Davison	(Australia) Alex Davison	Ashley Seward Motorsport	(Australia) Cameron McConville
3	R1	(Victoria (state)) Phillip Island Grand Prix Circuit	Phillip Island, Victoria	27 May	(New Zealand) Andre Heimgartner (Australia) Aaron Ireland	(Australia) Graham Williams (Australia) Nick Foster	(Australia) Nick McBride (Australia) Dylan Thomas	Sonic Motor Racing Services	(Australia) David Wall (Australia) Shane Smollen
3	R2	(Victoria (state)) Phillip Island Grand Prix Circuit	Phillip Island, Victoria	28 May	(Australia) Dylan O'Keeffe (Australia) Adam Gowans	(New Zealand) Andre Heimgartner (Australia) Aaron Ireland	(Australia) Dean Grant (Australia) Lee Holdsworth	Porsche Centre Melbourne	(Australia) David Wall (Australia) Shane Smollen
4	R1	(Northern Territory) Hidden Valley Raceway	Darwin, Northern Territory	17 June	(Australia) David Wall	(Australia) Alex Davison	(New Zealand) Jaxon Evans	McElrea Racing	(New Zealand) Jaxon Evans
4	R2	(Northern Territory) Hidden Valley Raceway	Darwin, Northern Territory	18 June		(Australia) Alex Davison	(New Zealand) Jaxon Evans	McElrea Racing	(New Zealand) Jaxon Evans
4	R3	(Northern Territory) Hidden Valley Raceway	Darwin, Northern Territory	18 June		(New Zealand) Andre Heimgartner	(New Zealand) Jaxon Evans	McElrea Racing	(New Zealand) Jaxon Evans
5	R1	(Malaysia) Sepang International Circuit	Sepang, Malaysia	22 July	(Australia) David Wall	(Australia) Alex Davison	(Australia) David Wall	Wall Racing	(Australia) David Wall
5	R2	(Malaysia) Sepang International Circuit	Sepang, Malaysia	23 July		(Australia) David Wall	(Australia) David Wall	Wall Racing	(Australia) David Wall
6	R1	(Victoria (state)) Sandown Raceway	Melbourne, Victoria	16 September	(Australia) Nick McBride	(Australia) Alex Davison	(Australia) Nick McBride	Sonic Motor Racing Services	(Australia) Nick McBride
6	R2	(Victoria (state)) Sandown Raceway	Melbourne, Victoria	16 September		(Australia) Alex Davison	(Australia) Nick McBride	Sonic Motor Racing Services	(Australia) Nick McBride
6	R3	(Victoria (state)) Sandown Raceway	Melbourne, Victoria	17 September		(Australia) Alex Davison	(Australia) Alex Davison	Ashley Seward Motorsport	(Australia) Nick McBride
7	R1	(New South Wales) Mount Panorama Circuit	Bathurst, New South Wales	6 October	(Australia) David Wall	(New Zealand) Andre Heimgartner	(Australia) David Wall	Wall Racing	(New Zealand) Andre Heimgartner
7	R2	(New South Wales) Mount Panorama Circuit	Bathurst, New South Wales	7 October		(Australia) Alex Davison	(New Zealand) Andre Heimgartner	Sonic Motor Racing Services	(New Zealand) Andre Heimgartner
7	R3	(New South Wales) Mount Panorama Circuit	Bathurst, New South Wales	8 October		(New Zealand) Andre Heimgartner^{†}	(New Zealand) Andre Heimgartner	Sonic Motor Racing Services	(New Zealand) Andre Heimgartner
8	R1	(Queensland) Surfers Paradise Street Circuit	Surfers Paradise, Queensland	21 October	(New Zealand) Andre Heimgartner	(New Zealand) Jaxon Evans	(New Zealand) Jaxon Evans	McElrea Racing	(New Zealand) Jaxon Evans
8	R2	(Queensland) Surfers Paradise Street Circuit	Surfers Paradise, Queensland	22 October		(New Zealand) Andre Heimgartner	(New Zealand) Andre Heimgartner	Sonic Motor Racing Services	(New Zealand) Jaxon Evans
8	R3	(Queensland) Surfers Paradise Street Circuit	Surfers Paradise, Queensland	22 October		(Australia) Alex Davison	(New Zealand) Jaxon Evans	McElrea Racing	(New Zealand) Jaxon Evans

- ^{†} New lap records

== Series standings ==
Pos.	Driver	ADE (South Australia)			AGP (Victoria (state))				PHI (Victoria (state))		HID (Northern Territory)			SEP (Malaysia)		SAN (Victoria (state))			BAT (New South Wales)			SUR (Queensland)			Pts.
Pro
1	David Wall	2	1	2	6	5	5	5	2	4	2	3	3	1	1	4	6	6	1	2	3	3	5	5	1145
2	Andre Heimgartner	1	3	1	2	2	7	3	6	3	8	6	4	4	8	2	3	2	3	1	1	2	1	3	1125
3	Alex Davison	4	Ret	7	5	4	2	1	14	2	3	2	2	2	5	3	2	1	2	3	2	10	3	2	1055
4	Nick McBride	8	7	4	1	1	3	4	1	Ret	7	8	8	9	4	1	1	3	5	6	4	8	7	7	901
5	Jaxon Evans	3	6	5	10	DNS	6	6	8	6	1	1	1	5	7	DNS	5	4	4	Ret	6	1	2	1	879.5
6	Dylan O'Keeffe	7	5	3	4	6	4	7	3	Ret	4	4	7	3	2	9	8	5	6	7	9	4	6	4	855
7	Cameron McConville	6	2	9	3	3	1	2	15	8	6	7	5	7	9	5	7	7	7	4	5	6	10	10	789
8	James Abela	5	4	8	8	9	10	10	7	Ret	5	5	6	10	Ret	8	13	8	11	9	8	Ret	9	6	527.5
9	Michael Almond	Ret	Ret	6	7	7	8	8	9	10	9	12	12			10	9	Ret	8	Ret	11	5	4	8	465
10	Simon Ellingham	DNS	10	12	12	11	Ret	12	13	11	12	11	11	16	15	12	14	12	14	13	13	15	13	13	344
11	Lars Kern	Ret	Ret	DNS	9	8	9	9						6	3										191.5
12	Jordan Love															6	Ret	14	9	5	10	11	8	9	187
13	Brenton Grove															7	4	10				9	12	12	146
14	Daniel Gaunt																		10	8	7				75
15	Garth Walden																					7	11	11	65
Challenge
1	Stephen Grove	9	8	10	11	10	11	11	5	7	13	12	Ret	11	10	15	10	9	Ret	12	Ret	12	Ret	DNS	1061
2	Marc Cini	10	9	11	Ret	12	12	13	9	12				15	14	16	16	13	13	11	Ret	18	15	15	904.5
3	Sam Shahin								4	9	11	10	9			17	12	15	DNS	14	15	16	16	16	681
4	Graham Williams				15	15	15	16	11	10				17	16	18	18	17	15	15	16	17	17	17	668.5
5	Tim Miles										10	Ret	10	12	11	11	11	11	12	10	12				634
6	Dean Cook				14	14	13	15						14	13	12	15	16				14	14	14	580
7	Dean Grant								10	1															153
8	Matt Palmer				13	13	14	14																	144
9	Shane Smollen													16	12										136
10	Rob Woods								12	5															129
11	Max Twigg																		Ret	Ret	14	13	Ret	DNS	108
guest drivers ineligible to score points
	John Morriss															14	17	Ret							0
