= Supabarn Supermarkets =

Australian supermarket chain

- Logo used since 2012
- Type: Private
- Industry: Retail
- Founded: 1991; 35 years ago
- Headquarters: Canberra, Australian Capital Territory, Australia
- Number of locations: 22 stores List: 14 Supaexpress; 8 Supabarn; (2025)
- Area served: Australian Capital Territory; New South Wales
- Key people: Theo Koundouris (General Manager)
- Products: Grocery items (ie. Food, drinks & daily essentials)
- Number of employees: 500+
- Website: www.supabarn.com.au

Supabarn is a family owned supermarket chain based in Canberra founded in 1991.

== History ==
In 2007, Supabarn was recognised for making over $1,000,000 in donations to their local community. Their old slogan was "Bite Into Life".

== Operations ==
Logo used between 1995-2012

The chain operates 22 stores across the Australian Capital Territory and New South Wales in Australia with its head office located in Canberra.

=== Current store formats ===
- Supabarn - standard format
- Supaexpress - convenience store format

== See also ==
List of supermarket chains in Oceania
