= Nissan Altima =

Mid-size car by Nissan

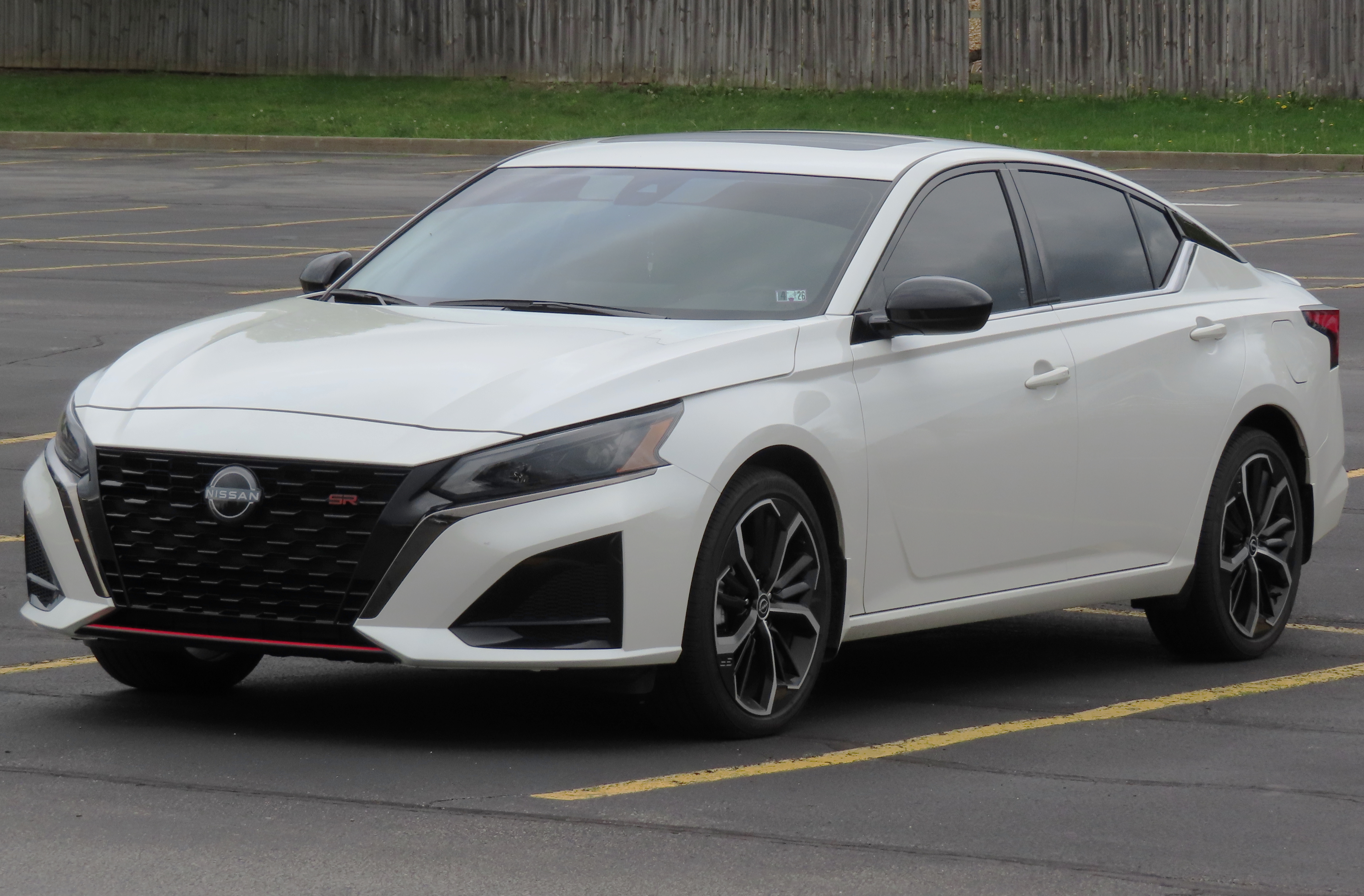
- 2024 Nissan Altima SR (L34; US)

Overview
- Manufacturer: Nissan
- Also called: Nissan Stanza Altima (1992–1993); Nissan Bluebird (1992–1997); Nissan Teana (2012–2020, 2025–present)
- Production: 1992–present
- Model years: 1993–present

Body and chassis
- Class: Compact car (1993–1997; 2007–2013 for coupes only); Mid-size car (1998–present)

Chronology
- Predecessor: Nissan Bluebird; Nissan Stanza

The Nissan Altima is a mid-size car manufactured by Nissan since 1992. It is an offshoot of the Nissan Bluebird line, which began in 1955.

The Altima has historically been larger, more powerful, and more luxurious than the Nissan Sentra but less so than the Nissan Maxima. The first through fourth-generation cars were manufactured exclusively in the United States and officially sold in North and South America, along with the Middle East and Australia. For other markets, Nissan sold a related mid-size sedan called the Nissan Teana which was between the Altima and Maxima in terms of size. In 2013, the Teana became a rebadged version of the fifth-generation Altima.

The name "Altima" was originally applied to a top trim line of the Nissan Leopard for the Japanese market in 1986, and then to the Nissan Laurel Altima mid-size car sold in Central America and the Caribbean before 1992. In 1992, Nissan discontinued the Stanza which was a Nissan Bluebird clone, replacing it with the US-built Altima, while remaining a compact car. The first Altima was produced in June 1992, as a 1993 model. All Altima models for the North American market were built in Smyrna, Tennessee, until June 2004, when Nissan's Canton, Mississippi plant also began producing the model to meet high demand.

== First generation (U13; 1992) ==
First generation
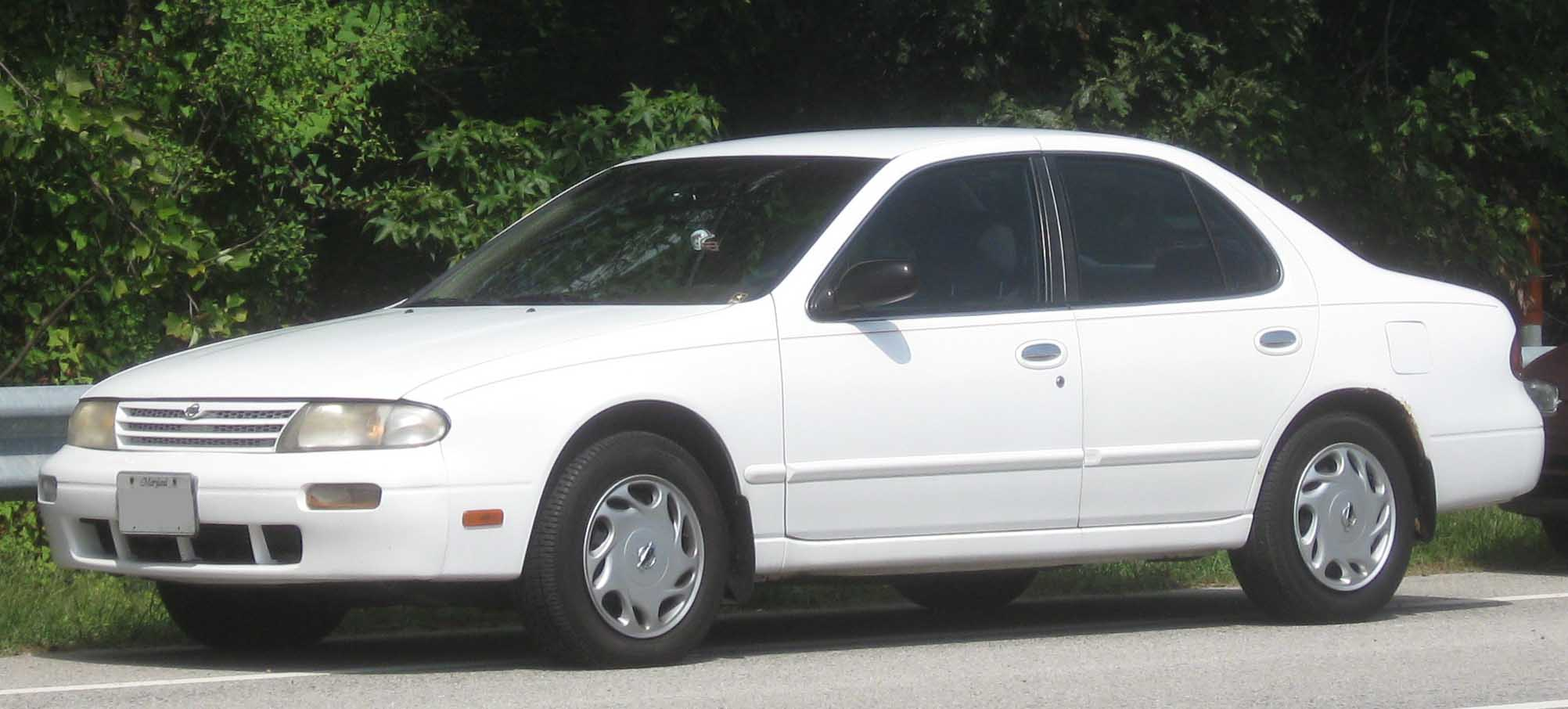

Overview
- Model code: U13
- Also called: Nissan Bluebird (U13); Nissan Stanza Altima (1992–1993); Nissan Bluebird Altima (Philippines)
- Production: June 1992 – May 1997
- Model years: 1993–1997
- Assembly: United States: Smyrna, Tennessee (Nissan Smyrna Assembly Plant); Japan: Yokosuka; Taiwan: Miaoli; Philippines: Makati
- Designer: Allan Flowers (1988)

Body and chassis
- Body style: 4-door sedan
- Layout: Front-engine, front-wheel-drive
- Related: Nissan Quest (V40)/Mercury Villager

Powertrain
- Engine: 2.4 L KA24DE I4
- Power output: 150 hp (152 PS; 112 kW)
- Transmission: 5-speed manual 4-speed automatic

Dimensions
- Wheelbase: 103.1 in (2,619 mm)
- Length: 180.5 in (4,585 mm)
- Width: 67.1 in (1,704 mm)
- Height: 55.9 in (1,420 mm)

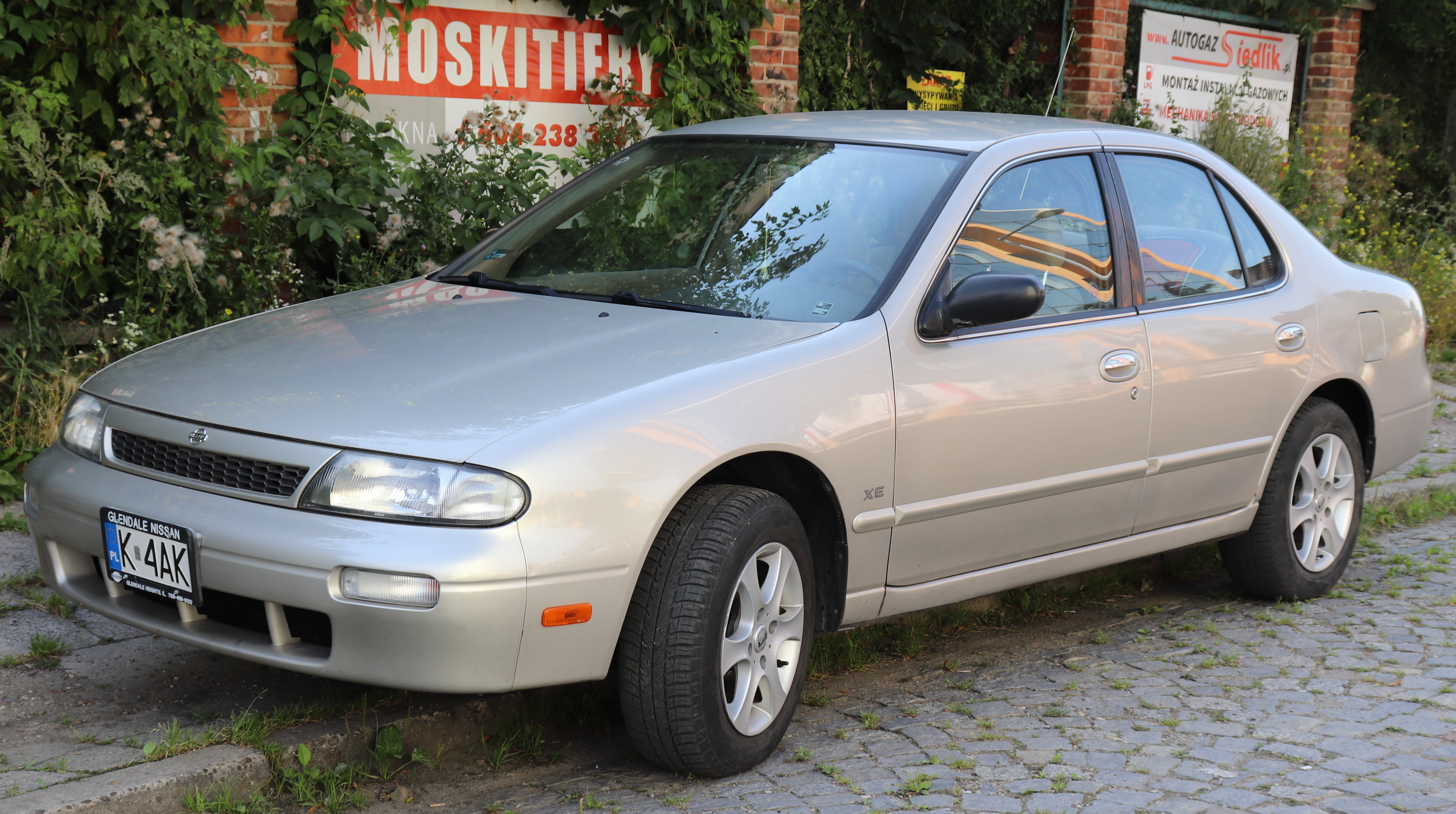
1993–1994 Altima XE

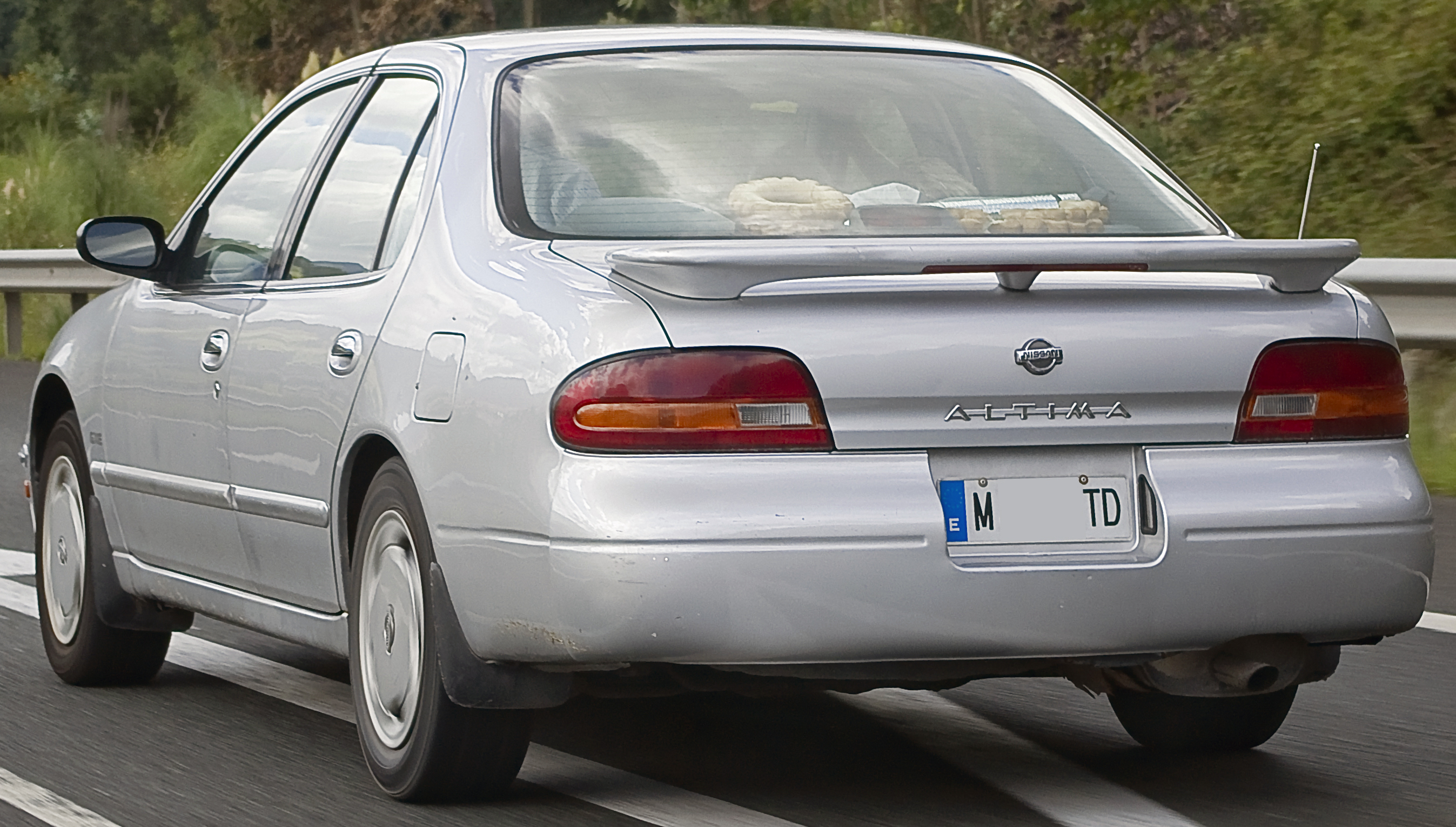
Rear view

Like the Stanza before it, the original Altima was the export version of the Nissan Bluebird SSS (chassis model U13), though its original styling hailed from Nissan's California design group (Blue Studio under Allan Flowers) in 1989. Initially, the car's official name was "Stanza Altima", which appears on the early owner's manuals. 1993 models can be seen with a sticker reading "Stanza" in small lettering to the right of the ALTIMA emblem on the trunk lid.

All Altima models used Nissan's 150 hp (112 kW) KA24DE straight-four DOHC engine mated to a 5-speed manual or 4-speed automatic (acceleration performance: 9.4 seconds 0–60 mph (0–100 km/h) with automatic and 8.2 with manual). (By contrast, the Japanese top trim package Bluebird SSS could be had with Nissan's SR20DET engine and ATTESA all-wheel-drive.) The suspension was composed of struts with stabilizer bars at both ends and was noted for sporty, satisfying handling (plus a firm ride and moderate road noise); all wheels were 15 inches. Being one of the bigger compact cars, the Altima could seat four adults fairly comfortably, though its body was too narrow for five. Trim lines consisted of the stripped XE, mid-line GXE, sporty SE, and luxury GLE. Some options included a gold emblem package, molded mud guards, and a pinstripe. All models had small cup holders under the radio and a small glovebox which were improved in the 1998 redesign.

The base XE (rare) had manual windows. The mid-line GXE had power windows, a power-retracting antenna, a pass-through rear armrest, a digital clock in the dash (optional on 1995 models), and color-matched plastic speaker grilles for the rear 6-inch speakers. The XE and GXE models only had the fixed intermittent wiper switch.

In addition to the GXE features, the SE had a stiffer suspension, fog lights, 3-leg mount rear spoiler (1993 models with a clear LED brake light), side skirts (no upper side moldings), and sport seats (plus a standard sunroof in 1994–1995). It also had 4-wheel disc brakes, which came on the other trim lines when antilock brakes were ordered.

The GLE's enhancements included a digital automotive head-up display (1993 and 1994 only), which displayed speed in mph or km/h, turn signals, and various warning lights on a unique mirrored patch made into the windshield. The 1989 to 1994 Maxima and 240SX had similar technology but only showed speed. Other features included a coin holder built into the fuse panel cover (1993 and 1994 only), adjustable lumbar support on the front seats, automatic digital climate control, keyless entry with alarm (optional), floor mats, color-matched side mirrors, cornering lights, sunroof, and a higher-powered six-speaker cassette/CD stereo which included 6X9 rear speakers with black metal "active speaker" grilles, metal color matched "active speaker" grilles for the front door speakers (1993 and 1994 only), and a pair of A pillar tweeters all powered by two factory amps mounted underneath the rear deck. In 1997 it gave up all of the above in exchange for standard leather (previously optional). All SE and GLE models had alloy wheels and variable intermittent wipers.

1993 Altimas came with rosewood-colored dash trim and a driver's side airbag coupled with automatic shoulder belts (the center console was slimmer to accommodate the lap belts). The 1994 Altima gained a darker burl wood dash trim, a flush-mount passenger airbag, and regular seat belts. 1993 and 1994 models came with chrome inner door handles standard with an auto door lock/unlock feature on the passenger side. For 1995, the inner door handles were changed to color-matched plastic, and a plug was replaced where the passenger auto door lock/unlock feature was. 1993 and 1994 models also had a slim 1 1/2 armrest lid; however, if an optional leather armrest was selected, it brought the height up to about 4.5 inches (110 mm). For 1995, all the armrest lids were thicker and about 4.5 inches (110 mm) tall. The 1995 model year (introduced in 1994) also brought a new venetian blind-like grille, new taillights (red and clear), and a new 2-leg mount spoiler with a red LED brake light for the SE. Some other changes included the removal of the rear speaker grilles for a flat rear deck, a cheaper cloth interior, a plastic cover replacing the rear ashtray, and the digital in-dash clock was now optional. A 1995.5 model, entering production on March 3, 1995, introduced a raised-mount passenger airbag with a new inflator. 1996 brought new wheel covers for base models. During the 1997 model year, the GXE gained a new "Limited Edition" package including alloy wheels, keyless entry, alarm, floor mats, and a Limited Edition sticker on each side near the front wheels. Most final-year Altima models were dubbed "1997.5" models, signifying the added crash protection necessary to meet 1997 side-impact standards.

== Second generation (L30; 1997) ==
Second generation
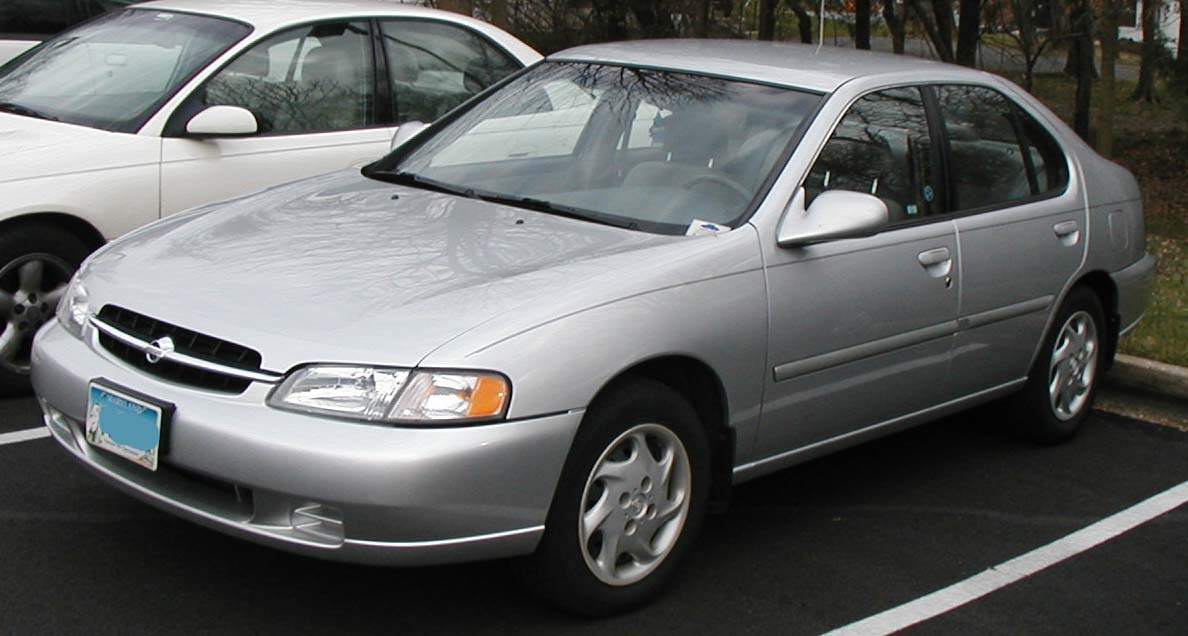

Overview
- Model code: L30
- Production: May 1997 – July 2001
- Model years: 1998–2001
- Assembly: United States: Smyrna, Tennessee
- Designer: Doug Wilson (1994)

Body and chassis
- Body style: 4-door sedan
- Layout: Front-engine, front-wheel-drive
- Related: Nissan Bluebird (U14); Nissan Quest (V41)/Mercury Villager

Powertrain
- Engine: Gasoline: 2.4 L KA24DE I4
- Power output: 150–155 hp (152–157 PS; 112–116 kW)
- Transmission: 5-speed manual 4-speed automatic

Dimensions
- Wheelbase: 103.1 in (2,619 mm)
- Length: 185.8 in (4,719 mm) (2000–01); 183.5 in (4,661 mm) (1997–99)
- Width: 69.1 in (1,755 mm)
- Height: 55.9 in (1,420 mm)

The second generation (chassis model L30) was an American/Canadian market-only version, again styled by Nissan's California design center under Doug Wilson through 1994 (design freeze in 1995). A new interior (by Diane Allen) brought a revised glove box and cup holders, a folding back seat (except on XE), and depowered airbags. The Japanese domestic market Bluebird U14 has different front and rear ends, and slightly narrower width dimensions to comply with the Japanese government dimension regulations.

While total volume remained identical at 108 cubic feet (3.1 m^{3}), most felt it was distributed better and resulted in a slightly roomier-feeling cabin. On the downside, many were let down by the new model's plainer styling and cheapened interior; some also felt the gas pedal was now too lightly sprung.

Trim lines were the stripped XE, volume-selling GXE, sporty SE, and luxury-trimmed GLE. The SE can be distinguished by its body-color grille, fog lights, rear spoiler, alloy wheels, and white-faced gauges. In this generation of Altima, all GLEs had leather seats standard.

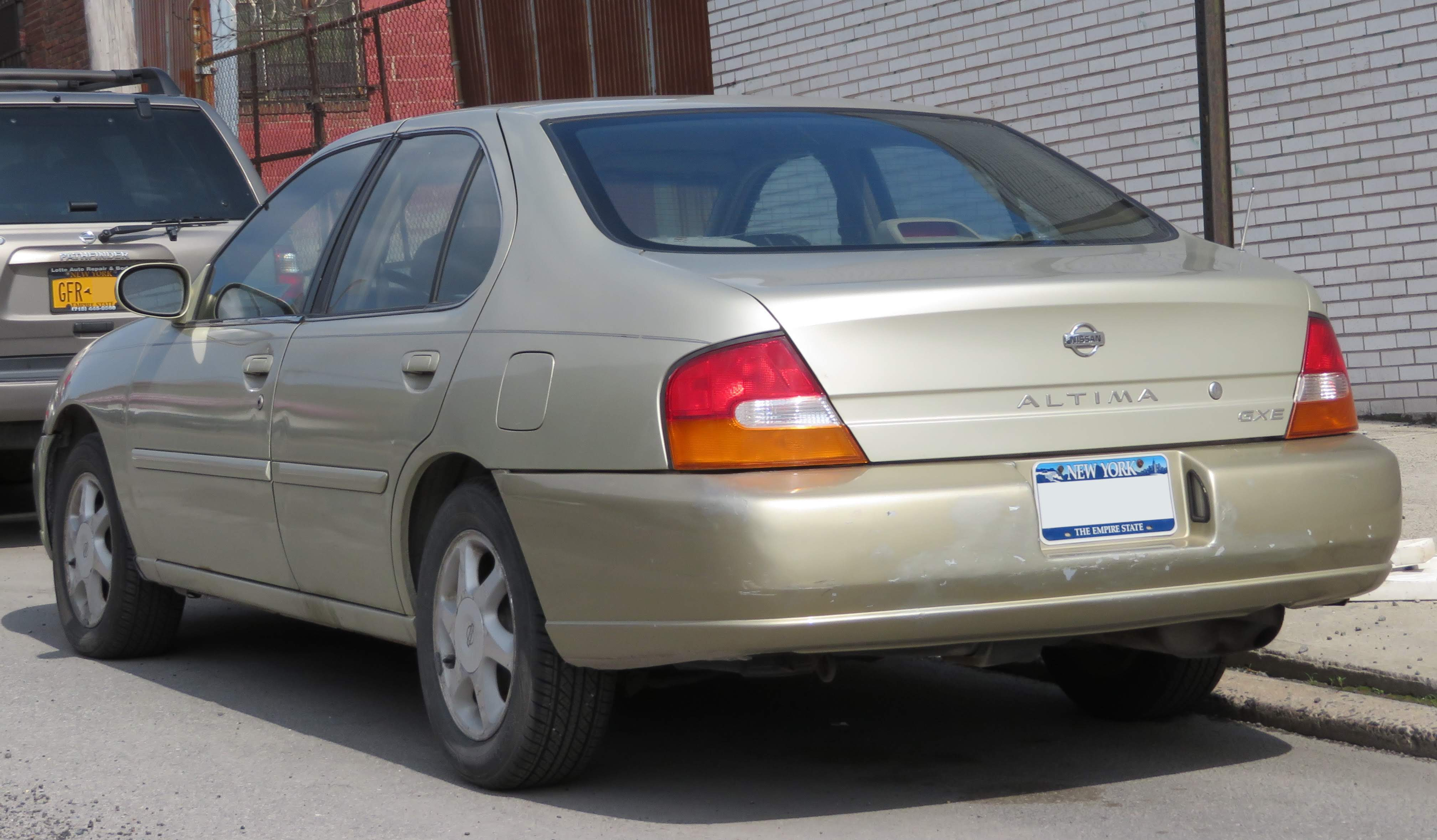
MY1998–1999 Nissan Altima rear

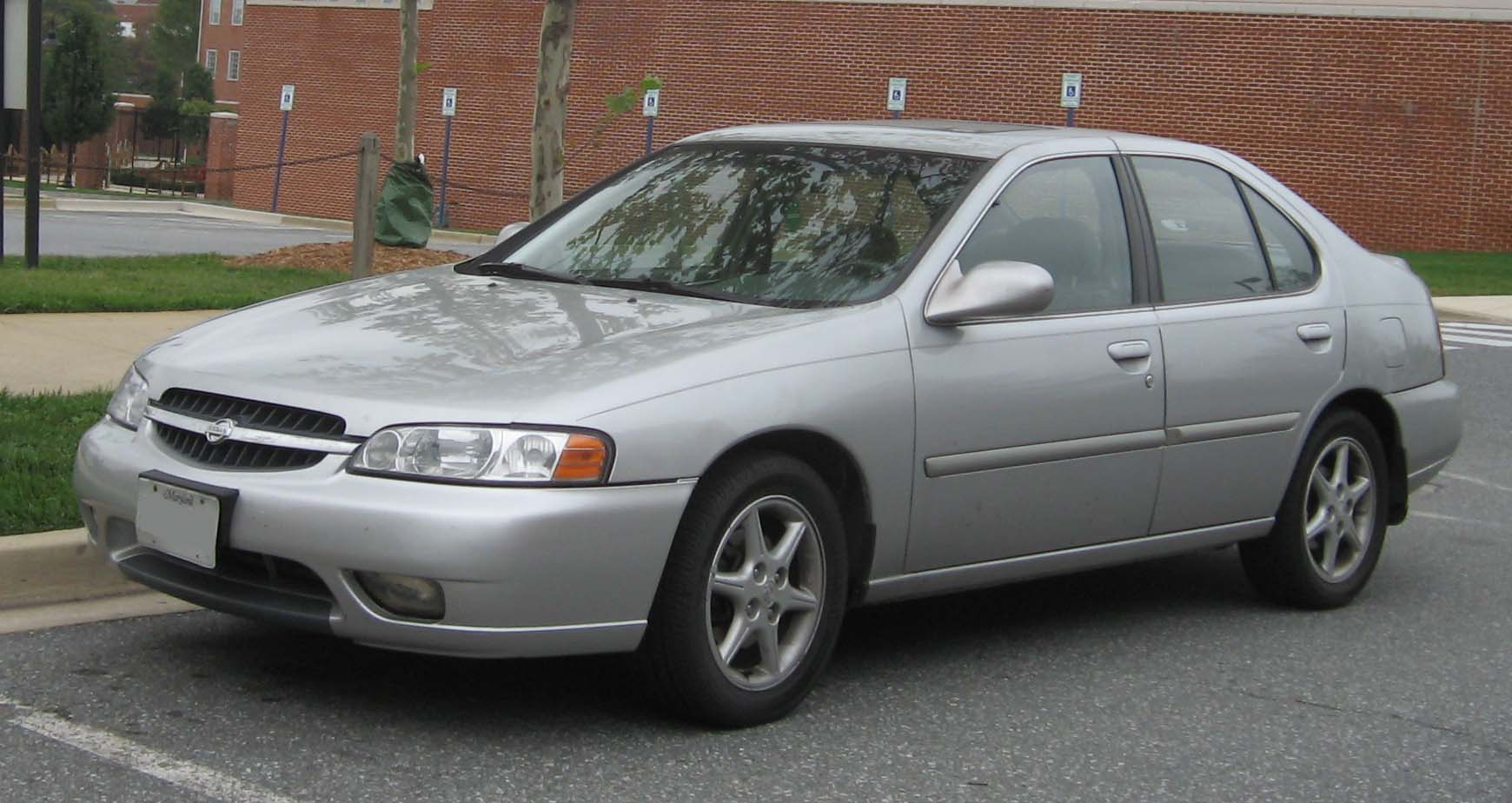
MY2000–2001 Nissan Altima SE

In 1998 for the 1999 model year, the uplevel cassette/CD stereo got a new faceplate, GXE and SE models gained variable intermittent wipers, and GLEs gained standard alloy wheels. The majority of changes came in 1999 for the 2000 model year. The engine increased in power from 150 to 160 horsepower with 4-way sparks, while it also improved the 0–60 mph time from 8.7 to 8.4 seconds. Gearing and final drive ratios were shortened on both transmissions, stabilizer bars were thickened, and the steering was firmed up. SE and GLE models also upgraded to 16-inch wheels with lower-profile tires, new Monroe struts with "acceleration-sensitive strut valving", and a front strut tower brace for sportier handling (all optional on GXE).

The Altima grew slightly longer and got a deeper front grille, one-piece headlamps with integrated turn signals and standard low-speed cornering lamps, all-red taillights, and the plastic trim on the deck lid. Inside were new front seats with a driver's height adjuster, cup holders for the rear seat (automatic transmission models only), revised seat cloth, a new instrument panel with digital odometer, a new rear window antenna, and the keyless entry fob now included a trunk release. Side airbags were newly standard on GLE and available on GXE and SE. For 2001, the Altima GXE again gained a Limited Edition package: a power driver's seat, keyless entry with alarm, and floor mats.

== Third generation (L31; 2001) ==
Third generation
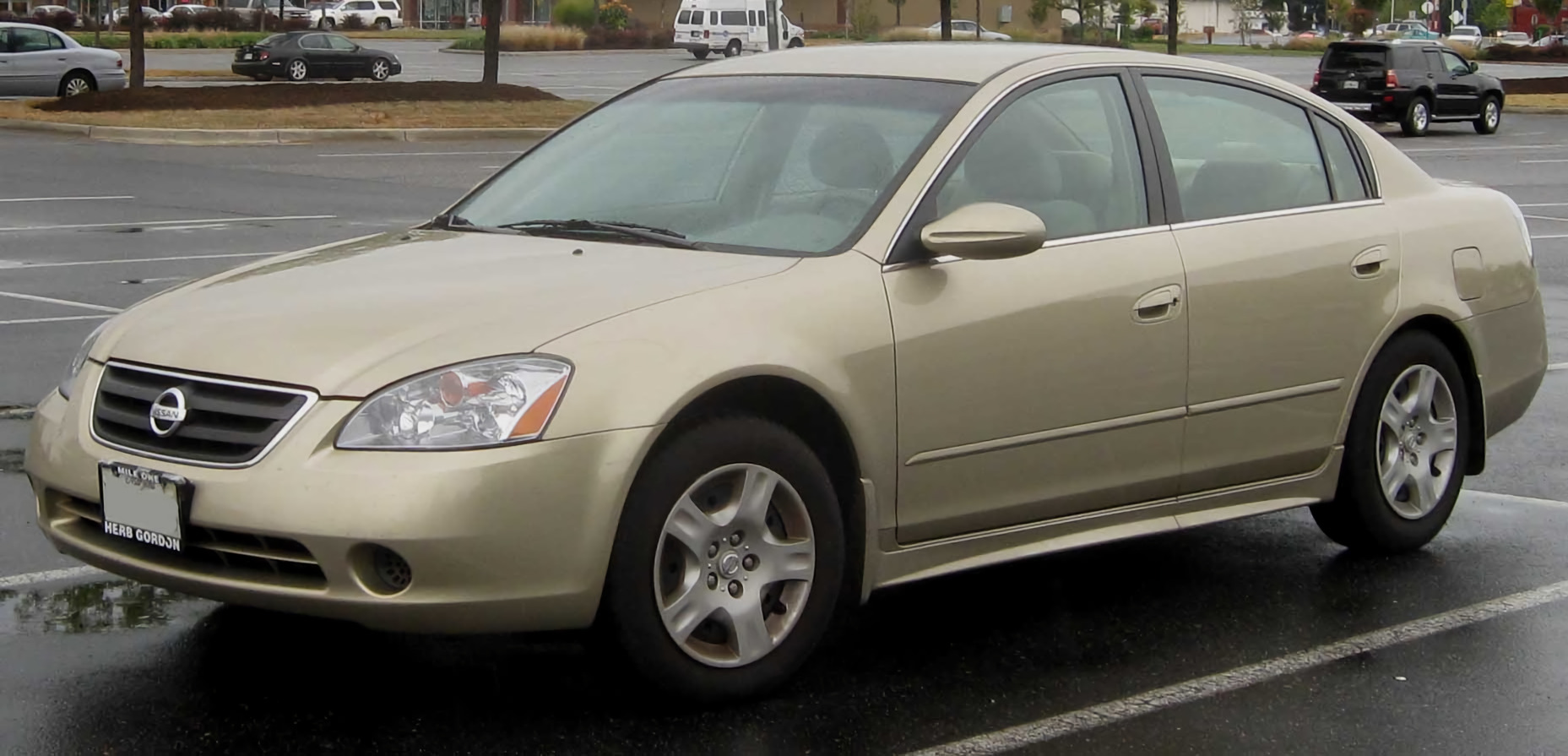

Overview
- Model code: L31
- Production: August 2001 – October 2006
- Model years: 2002–2006
- Assembly: United States: Smyrna, Tennessee; Canton, Mississippi
- Designer: Jerry Hirshberg (1999)

Body and chassis
- Body style: 4-door sedan
- Layout: Front-engine, front-wheel-drive
- Platform: Nissan FF-L platform
- Related: Nissan Maxima; Nissan Murano; Nissan Quest; Nissan Teana; Renault Samsung SM5; Renault Samsung SM7

Powertrain
- Engine: Gasoline: 2.5 L QR25DE I4; 3.5 L VQ35DE V6
- Transmission: 5/6-speed manual; 4-speed automatic; 5-speed AF33 manumatic

Dimensions
- Wheelbase: 110.2 in (2,799 mm)
- Length: 192.3 in (4,884 mm) (2005–06); 191.5 in (4,864 mm) (2001–04)
- Width: 70.4 in (1,788 mm)
- Height: 57.9 in (1,471 mm)

The third-generation Altima (chassis model L31) debuted in 2001 for the 2002 model year. It was the first mass-market product built on Nissan's new FF-L platform, which was unique to North America and had no equivalent model in Japan. The Asian Nissan Teana is similar but not quite identical, designed for Asian market requirements; all three model lines shared the same platform. The Altima grew significantly for this generation, as interior volume expanded to 118.8 cubic feet (3.36 m^{3}). The Altima's interior dimensions even surpassed those of the higher-end 2000–03 Maxima, so the 2004 Maxima was moved more upscale into the full-size bracket. Also, the biggest in class was the Altima's 20 US gal (76 L; 17 imp gal) fuel tank. Additionally, the Altima upgraded its rear suspension to a multi-link type and its brakes to 4-wheel discs. This was the first generation to offer a V6 engine.

2003–2004 models received a two-tone dash color, and the 3.5 SE received an upgrade in horsepower, from 240 hp (179 kW) to 245 hp (183 kW), though torque stayed the same at 246 lb⋅ft (334 N⋅m). 2002–2004 models with manual gearbox were the lightest of the V6 (4DR) cars. The 2.5-liter 4-cylinder engine accelerated the sedan from 0–60 mph (95 km/h) in 8.6 seconds.

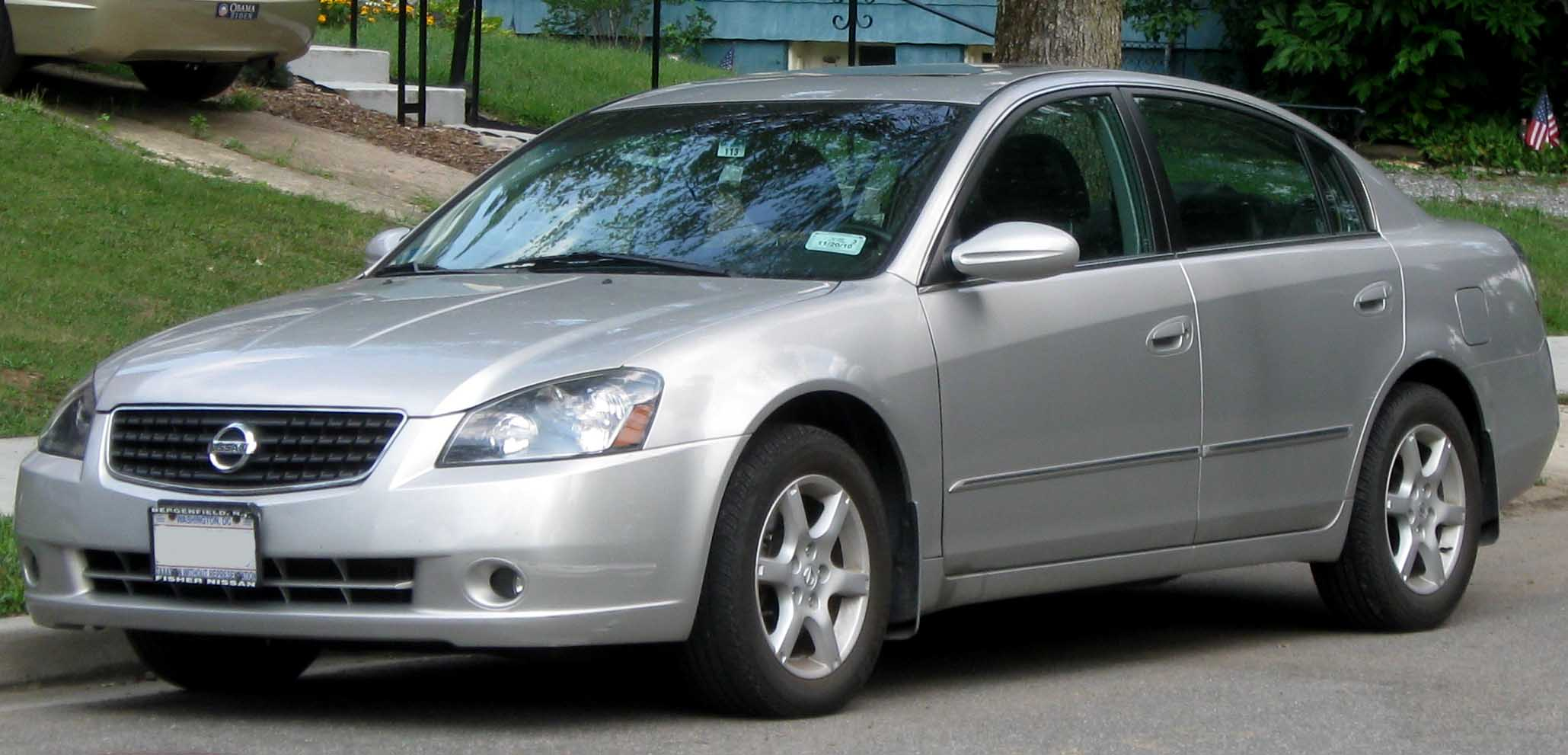
MY2005–2006 Altima 2.5S

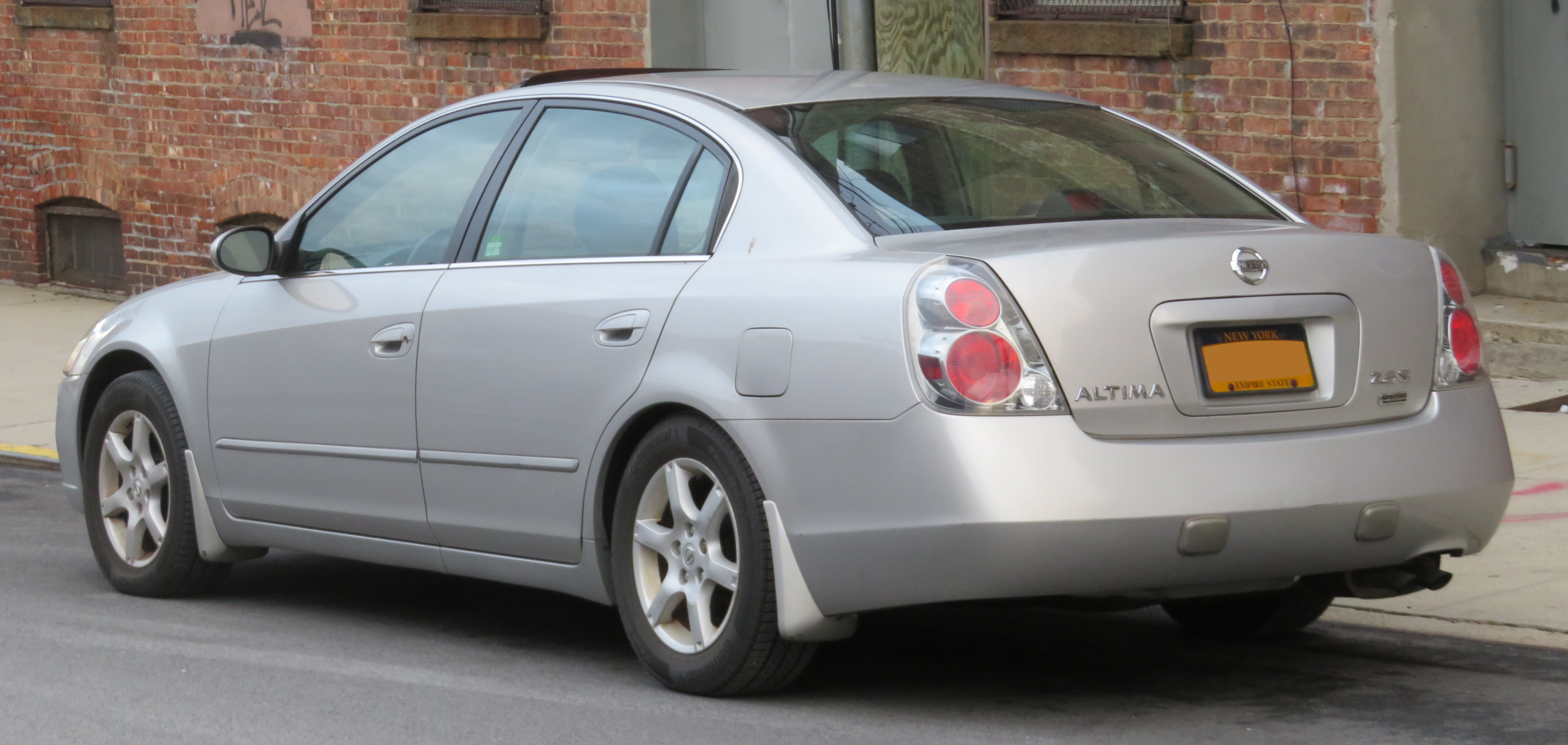
2006 Nissan Altima 2.5S Special Edition

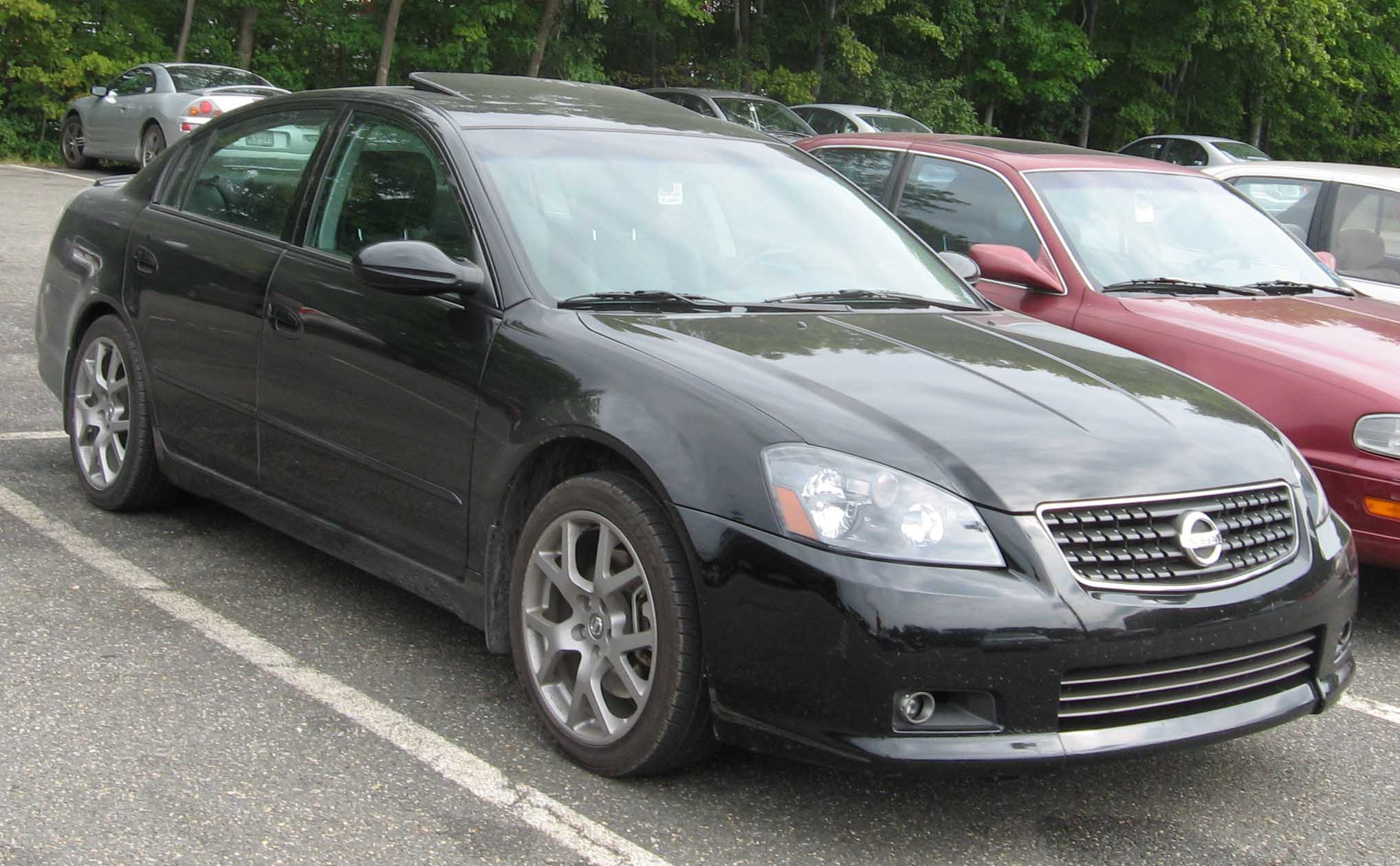
MY2005–2006 Altima SE-R

The 2005 Nissan Altima received a facelift, including a new front grille, all-red taillights, redesigned interior, and an optional DVD-based navigation system. The V6 was now rated at 250 hp (186 kW) with torque rated at 249 lb⋅ft (338 N⋅m), and a 0–60 mph (97 km/h) time of 6.2 seconds utilizing the 5-speed automatic transmission. Also new was the SE-R model with a 260 hp (194 kW) and 251 lb⋅ft (340 N⋅m) of torque version of the V6, a 6-speed manual transmission (automatic still optional), upgraded brakes, 18-inch wheels, a suspension even stiffer than that of the 3.5 SE's, and a high-flow exhaust. Car and Driver tested the SE-R resulting in 0–60 mph (95 km/h) in 6.1 seconds. MotorWeek episode #2432 tested a SE-R equipped with an automatic transmission that produced a 0–60 mph time of 5.8 seconds.

=== Reception ===
The third-generation Altima was well received by the press, with many critics praising its new style and extra space and calling it one of the most powerful and best-handling family sedans available. As the Altima offered the performance and space of the upper-market Maxima in a less expensive car, this significantly reduced Maxima sales but made Nissan competitive in the mid-size segment for the first time. While previous iterations received decent reviews, the third-generation Altima was the first to enjoy considerable success, and it was credited with a turnaround of Nissan's operations from debt-ridden to among the industry's most profitable.

Most criticism centered on the interior found in the 2002–2004 models, which were cited for using hard and brittle plastics. Some also found the steering too light and/or abrupt, and the turning circle too wide due to its elongated wheelbase.

=== Mechanical issues ===
The 2002 2.5-liter Altimas had major excessive oil consumption issues causing potential catastrophic engine failures. Some cases were because of owner neglect and other cases involved the catalytic converter failing, forcing foreign objects back into the exhaust manifold. Most reports were received after the vehicle was beyond 100,000 miles and more than eight years old (beyond any warranties) and most of the reports had only to do with the 2002–2003 model ranges.

In April 2015, a class action lawsuit was filed in the United States District Court for the Northern District of Illinois on behalf of all Nissan Altima owners of 2002 through 2006 model years. The lawsuit originally alleged that Nissan manufactured those model years with defective floorboards on both the driver and passenger side of the vehicle but was dismissed by a judge in January 2016. The resulting premature rust was extensive and generally happened out of warranty. The real cause was that the front mudguards were not high enough and there was no stone guard applied to the metal plates underneath the vehicle. Other car models from other car manufacturers have also experienced the same problem to a lesser extent. Nissan changed the design of the floorboards for the fourth generation and thus the problem did not recur from 2007 onwards.

== Fourth generation (L32; 2006) ==
Fourth generation
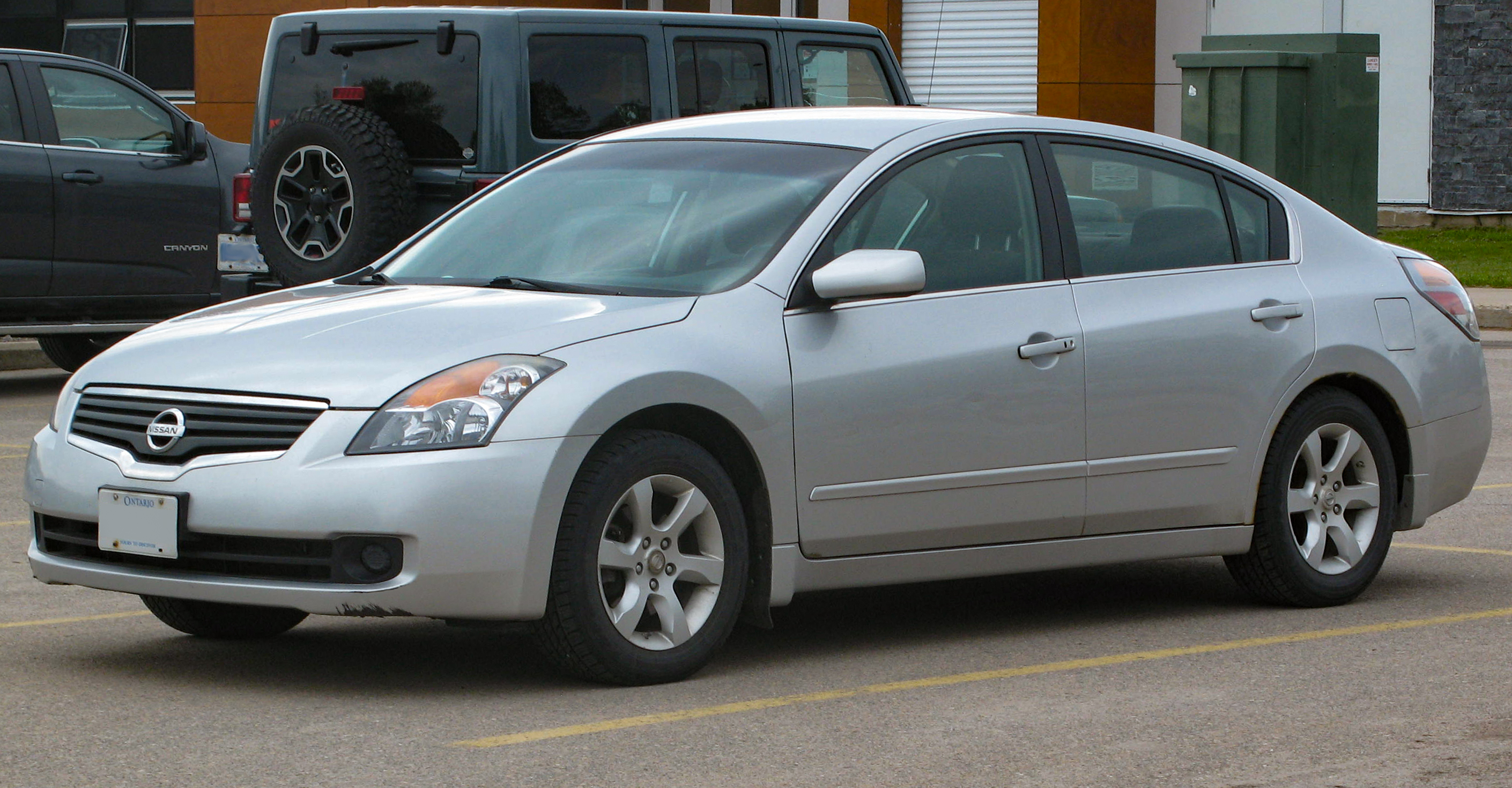
- 2008 Nissan Altima 2.5 S (pre-facelift, Canada)

Overview
- Model code: L32
- Production: September 2006 – May 2012 (sedan); May 2007–July 2013 (coupe)
- Model years: 2007–2012 (sedan); 2008–2013 (coupe)
- Assembly: United States: Smyrna, Tennessee; Canton, Mississippi
- Designer: Ajay Panchal, Takashi Noguchi (sedan: 2004); Toshiyuki Abe (coupe: 2005)

Body and chassis
- Body style: 4-door sedan 2-door coupe
- Layout: Front-engine, front-wheel-drive
- Platform: Renault–Nissan D platform
- Related: Nissan Maxima (A35)

Powertrain
- Engine: Gasoline: 2.5 L QR25DE I4; 3.5 L VQ35DE V6
- Transmission: 6-speed manual CVT

Dimensions
- Wheelbase: 109.3 in (2,776 mm) (sedan); 105.3 in (2,675 mm) (coupe)
- Length: 189.8–190.7 in (4,821–4,844 mm) (sedan); 180.9–182.5 in (4,595–4,636 mm) (coupe)
- Width: 70.7 in (1,796 mm) (sedan & coupe); 69.6 in (1,768 mm) (hybrid)
- Height: 57.9–58.3 in (1,471–1,481 mm) (sedan); 55.3–55.9 in (1,405–1,420 mm) (coupe)
- Curb weight: 3,179–3,289 lb (1,442–1,492 kg)

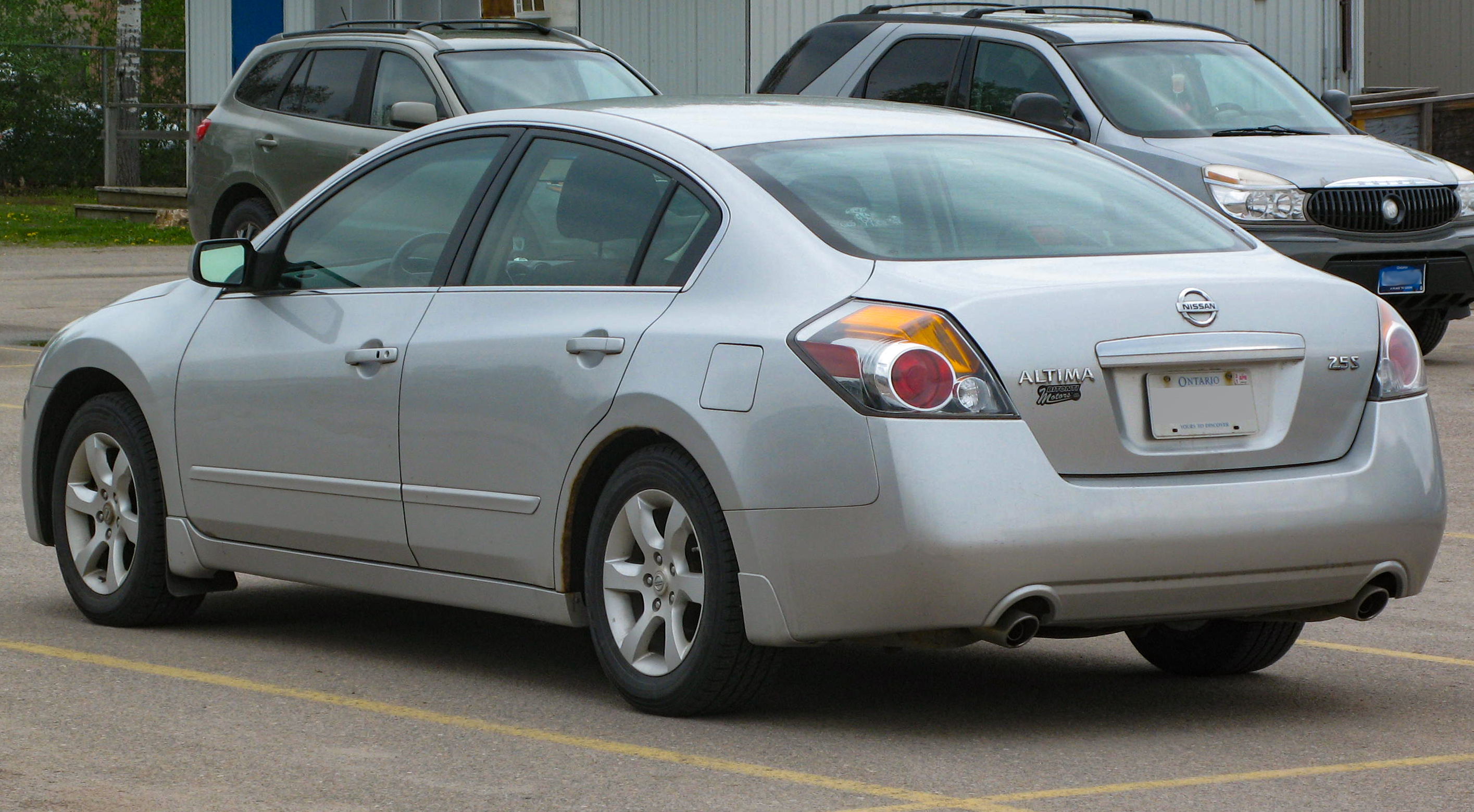
Rear view

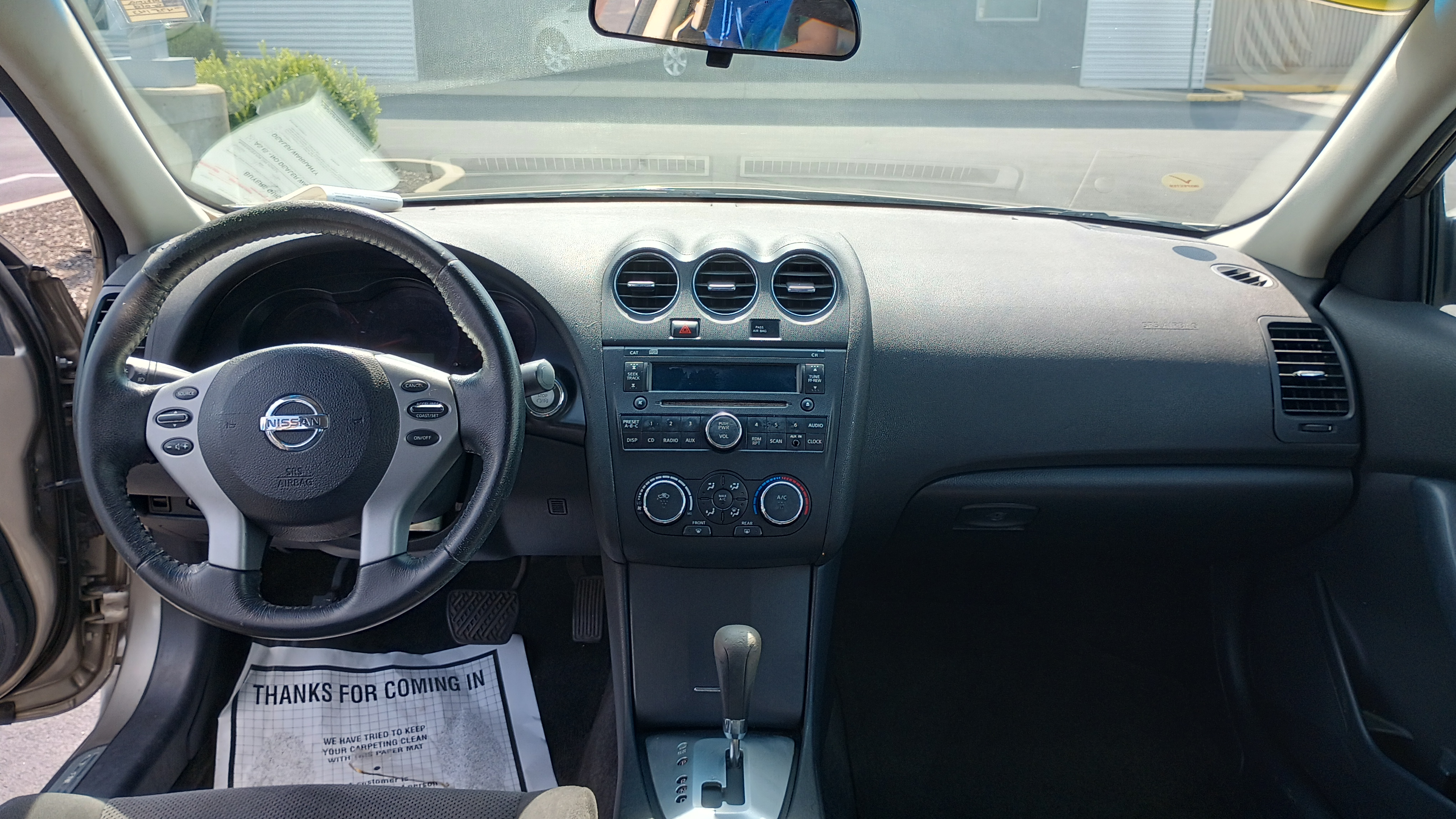
Interior

The fourth-generation Nissan Altima (chassis model L32A) was announced at the 2006 New York International Auto Show on April 12, 2006. It was the first Nissan sold in America to use the smaller Nissan D platform, with a new front and upgraded rear suspension. The wheelbase is 1-inch (25 mm) shorter than the third-generation Altima, but interior space was mostly unchanged. The Maxima and Murano also used this new platform starting with the 2009 models. As with the previous generation, it shares much of its mechanicals and platform with the Nissan Teana which is built for different market conditions in Asia.

The fourth-generation Altima used revised versions of the engines from the third-generation model. The VQ35DE 3.5 L V6 engine produces 270 hp (201 kW) and 258 lb⋅ft (350 N⋅m) of torque, and the QR25DE 2.5 L straight-four engine produces 175 hp (130 kW) and 180 lb⋅ft (244 N⋅m) of torque. A 6-speed manual is standard, and a continuously variable transmission replaced the traditional automatic as the optional transmission.

This generation Altima came packaged with new technology such as a standard Smart Key (referred to as the "Nissan Intelligent Key"), along with available Bluetooth capability for cell phones, and a parking camera. The dashboard was designed with larger buttons for easy readability and a total of eight cup holders, two in front of the center console, two in the rear armrest, and one 20-ounce cup holder in each door. Several hidden compartments were added as well as doubling the glove compartment space to 0.46 cubic feet (13 L). For 2008, all Altima models received ABS with electronic brake-force distribution.

In 2008, a new base model named the 2.5 became available as a more affordable version by offering less equipment.

=== Facelift ===
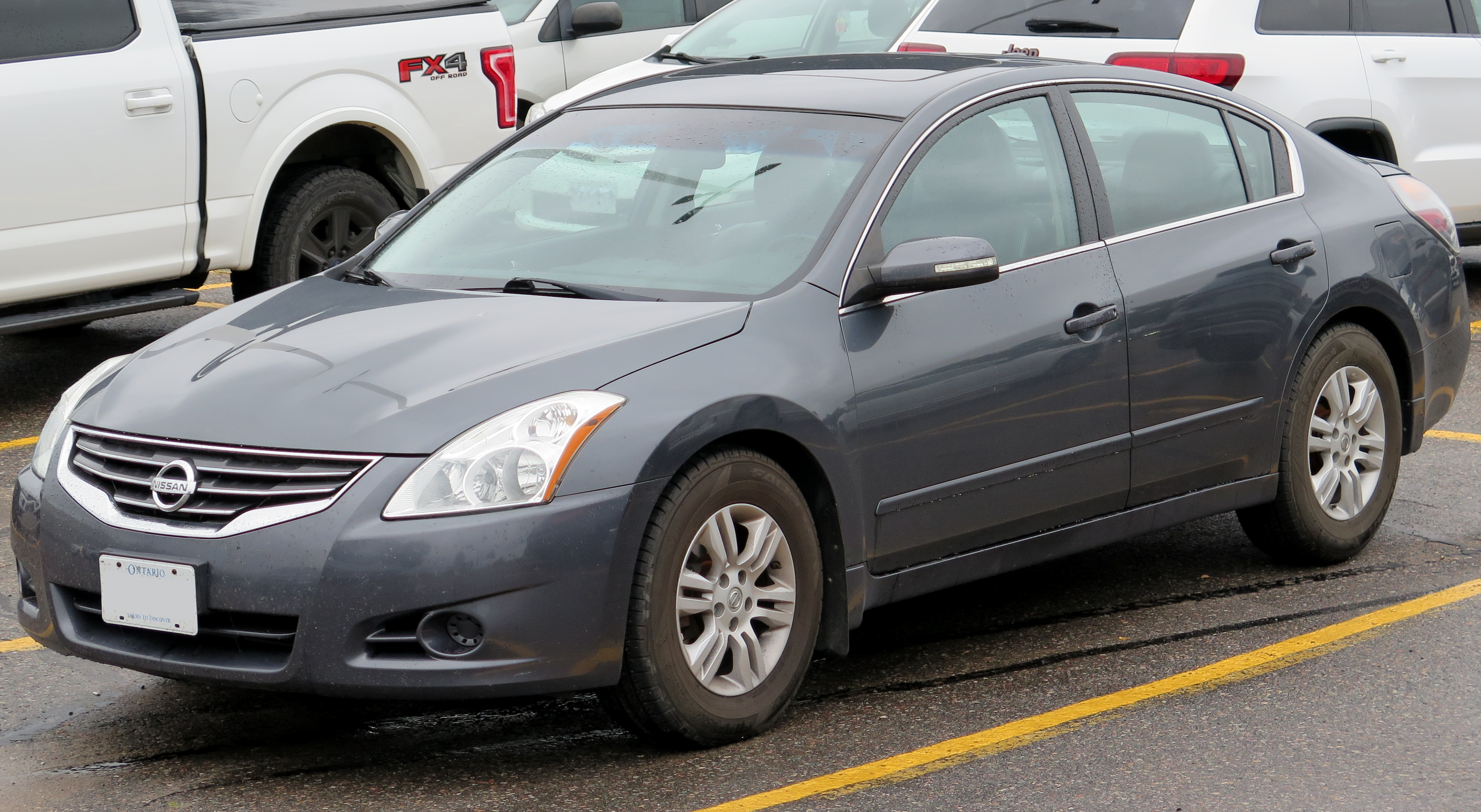
2011 Nissan Altima 2.5S (Facelift, Canada)

In 2009 for the 2010 model year, the Nissan Altima was facelifted with a new front fascia, hood, and headlights, as well as new wheels and interior materials. Electronic stability control, previously only offered as part of an option package on V6 models and unavailable with 4-cylinder engines, is now standard on all Altima trims including 4-cylinder models. The CVT had been made standard by this point for most trims; the manual was dropped from dealer orders for the 2010 model year. However, the SR (formerly the SE) could still be had with a 6-speed manual (though this was for customer orders only); it was pulled from the sedan for good for the 2011 model year.

=== Coupe (D32, 2007) ===
The coupe version of the Nissan Altima (codename D32) was officially revealed at the 2006 Los Angeles Auto Show, Nissan's first-ever two-door Altima. It had a shorter wheelbase, shorter overall length, and lower height than the Altima Sedan. It was released on May 25, 2007, for the 2008 model year.

The 2008 Altima Coupe was available with two engines: the same updated VQ35DE in the sedan, a 270 hp (201 kW) 3.5-liter 24-valve DOHC V6 or the QR25DE, a 175 hp (130 kW) 2.5-liter DOHC 16-valve inline 4-cylinder.

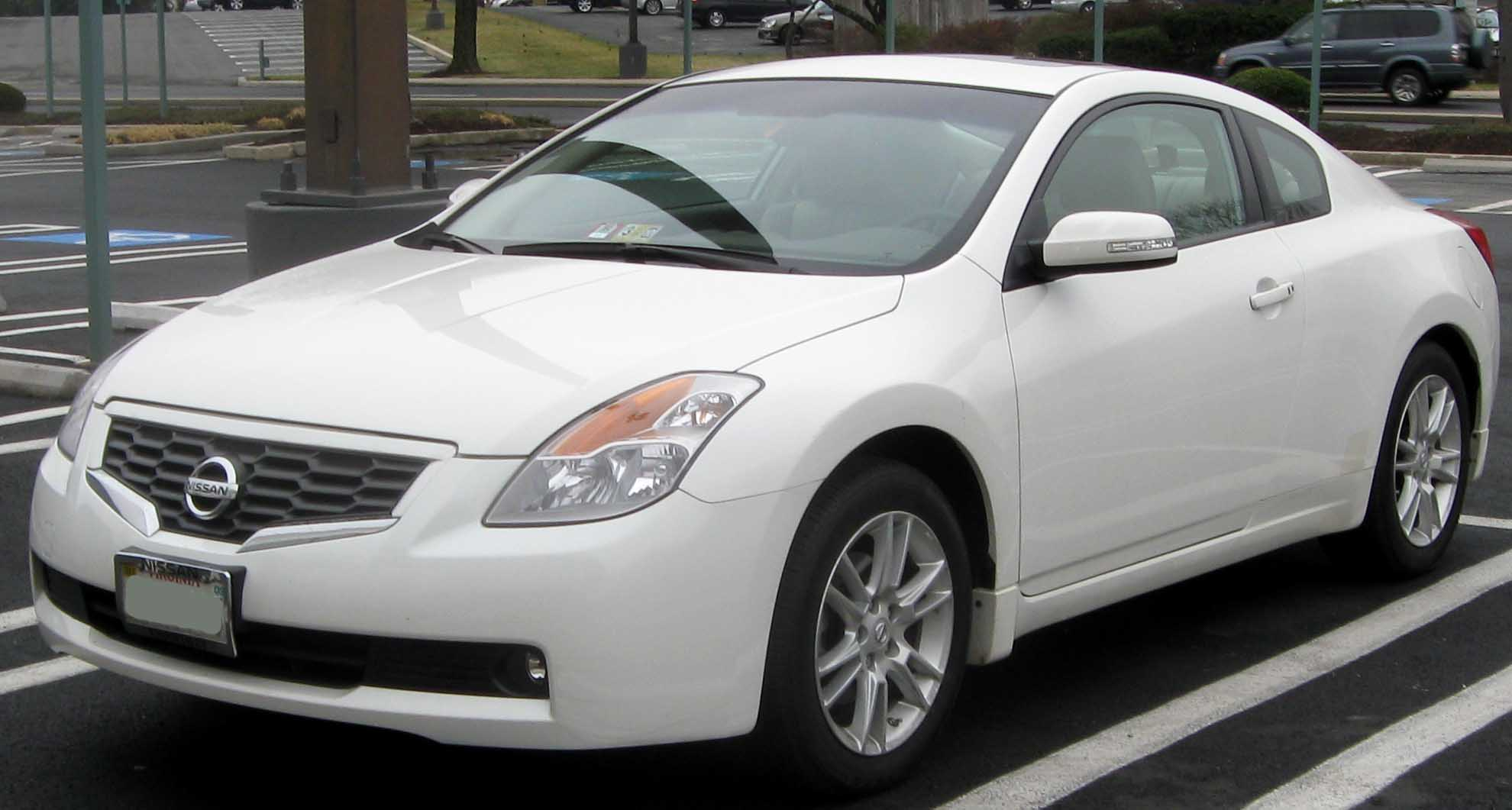
MY2008–2009 Nissan Altima coupe

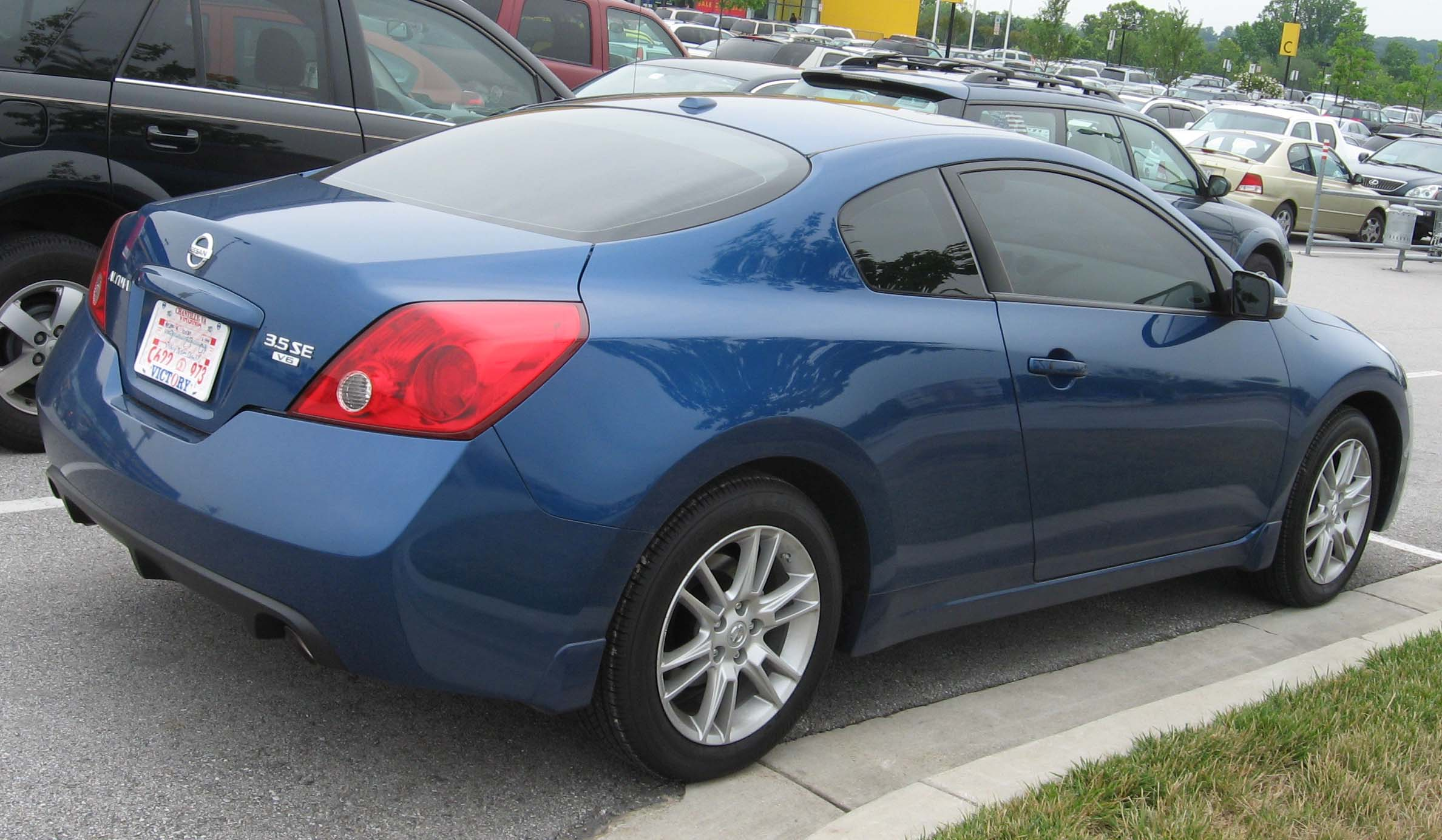
MY2008–2009 Nissan Altima coupe

==== Facelift ====
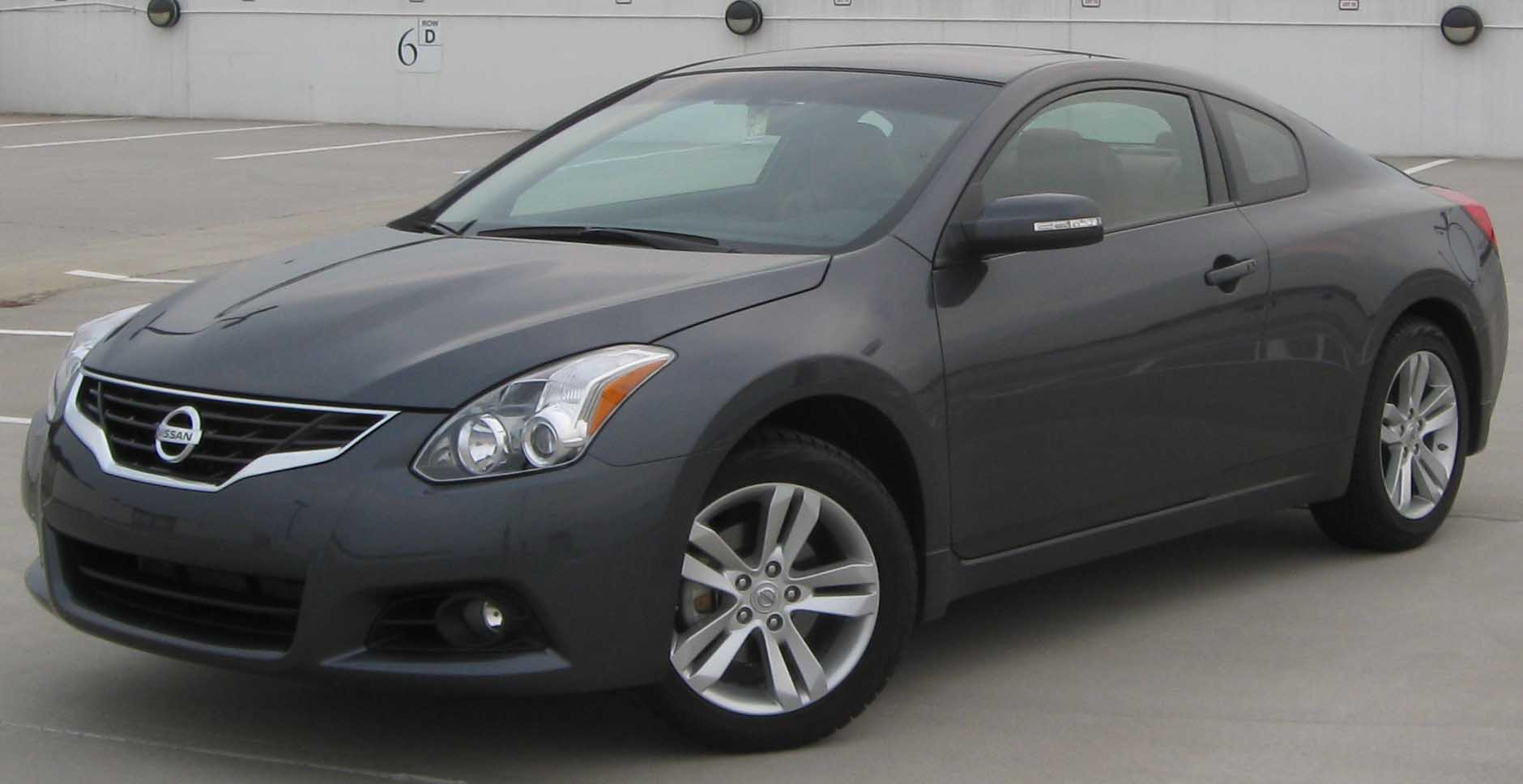
2010 Nissan Altima 2.5S coupe

Like the sedan, the Altima Coupe received a facelift for 2010 which included a redesigned front end, hood and grille, new projector-beam headlights, and the Altima Coupe 2.5 S model came standard with 17" × 7.5" 5-split-spoke aluminum alloy wheels, along with P215/55TR17 all-season tires instead of the 16" steel wheels provided in the former. The SE model was renamed SR and came standard with 18" × 8.0" 5-split-spoke aluminum-alloy wheels, and there was a revision to the fabric and trim pieces in the interior. The 2010 models came with Nissan's Vehicle Dynamic Control as standard equipment, which was previously a $600 (~$886.00 in 2025) stand-alone option. A new premium Bose audio system with a 4.3-inch color display and Nissan's next-generation navigation system with a 6.5-inch color display with an internal hard drive providing 9.3 GB of music storage and USB connectivity were also included with the refresh. Azure Blue was replaced by Navy Blue and there were two additional colors: Crimson Black and Ocean Gray.

In 2012 for the 2013 model year (Generation 5), the 3.5 SR trim level was dropped completely for the coupe, meaning that for this particular model year, only the sedan was available with a 3.5 L V6, and 2013 is the final model year for the Altima Coupe, while the sedan gets redesigned for the 2013 model year and continues production for future model years. This model year also included the first, standard-equipped, NASA-inspired "zero gravity" front row seating. These seats use research from the U.S. space and aeronautics agency to reduce muscle fatigue in drivers. Zero Gravity seating is now available in the 2015 and 2016 Rogue, 2015 Altima, 2015 Murano, 2016 Maxima, and 2016 Titan.

=== Hybrid ===
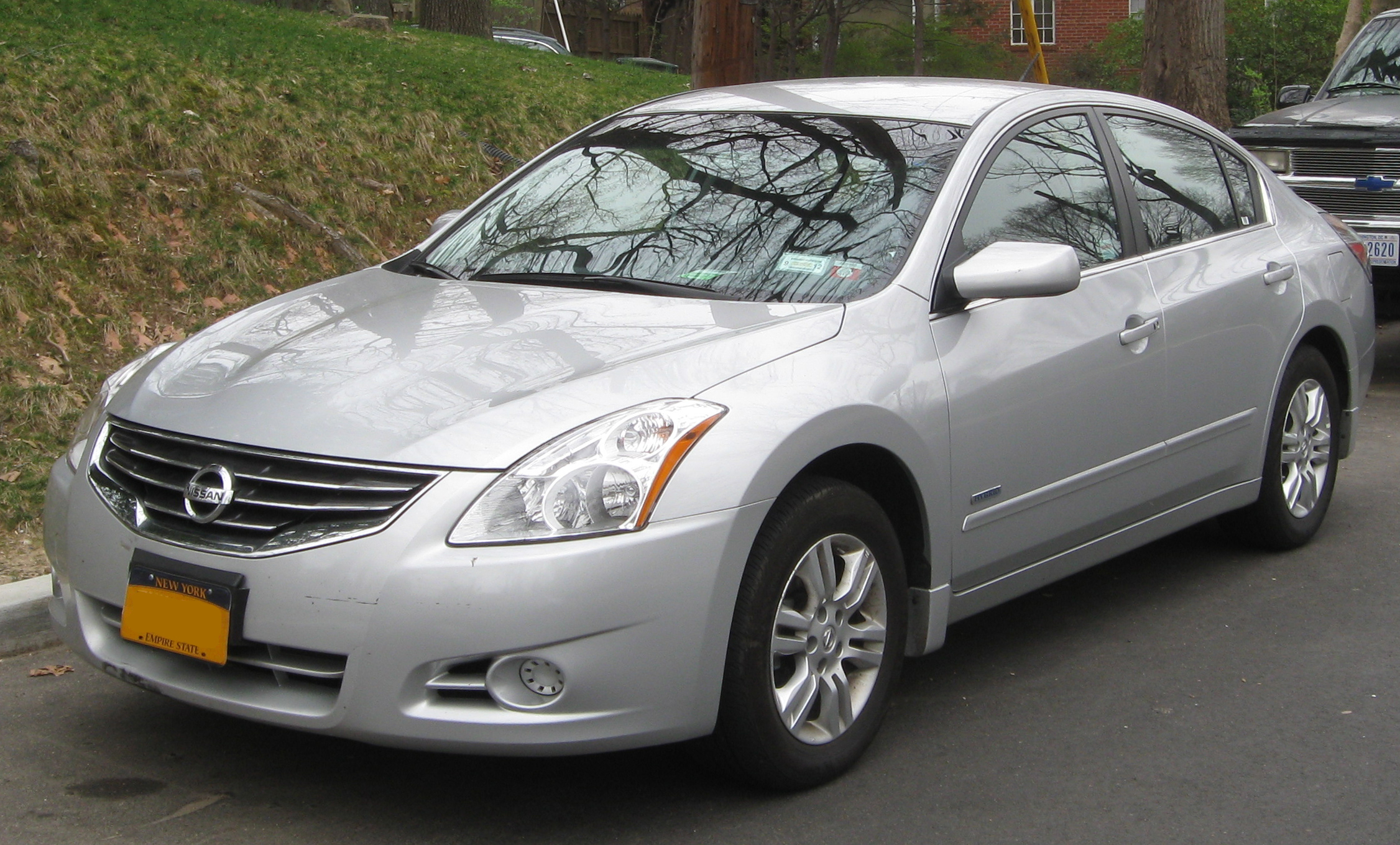
Nissan Altima Hybrid

The Altima Hybrid was Nissan's first hybrid car, first introduced in February 2007 and discontinued in 2011 for the 2011 model year. In the U.S. it was only available in 10 states that followed California's strict energy laws (California, Oregon, Connecticut, Maine, Maryland, Massachusetts, New Jersey, New York, Rhode Island, and Vermont), and was also available in Canada. Its hybrid-drive system was licensed from Toyota's hybrid technology; the company asserted that subsequent hybrid models would be based on hybrid technology developed in-house. Up to 40,000 per year were to be built at Nissan's Smyrna plant. The Altima Hybrid was also used as a regular taxi vehicle and as a police cruiser with the New York City Police Department until it was discontinued.

The Hybrid featured a 2.5 L QR25DE engine producing 158 hp (118 kW) and 162 lb⋅ft (220 N⋅m) of torque, and CVT. The electric motor/generator put out an additional 40-horsepower putting out max power of 198 hp (148 kW), and 199 lb⋅ft (270 N⋅m). Its fuel efficiency was 6.7 L/100 km (42 mpg_{‑imp}; 35 mpg_{‑US}) city and 7.1 L/100 km (40 mpg_{‑imp}; 33 mpg_{‑US}) highway, based on revised EPA measures for fuel economy ratings. After the 2011 model year, Nissan discontinued the Altima Hybrid due to poor sales.

Features on the Hybrid were identical to those of the gasoline-only 2.5 S trim, and additional packages were also available, including a package that added leather-trimmed seating surfaces. The Hybrid also included the aluminum-alloy wheels that were otherwise optional on the 2.5 S.

== Fifth generation (L33; 2012) ==
Fifth generation
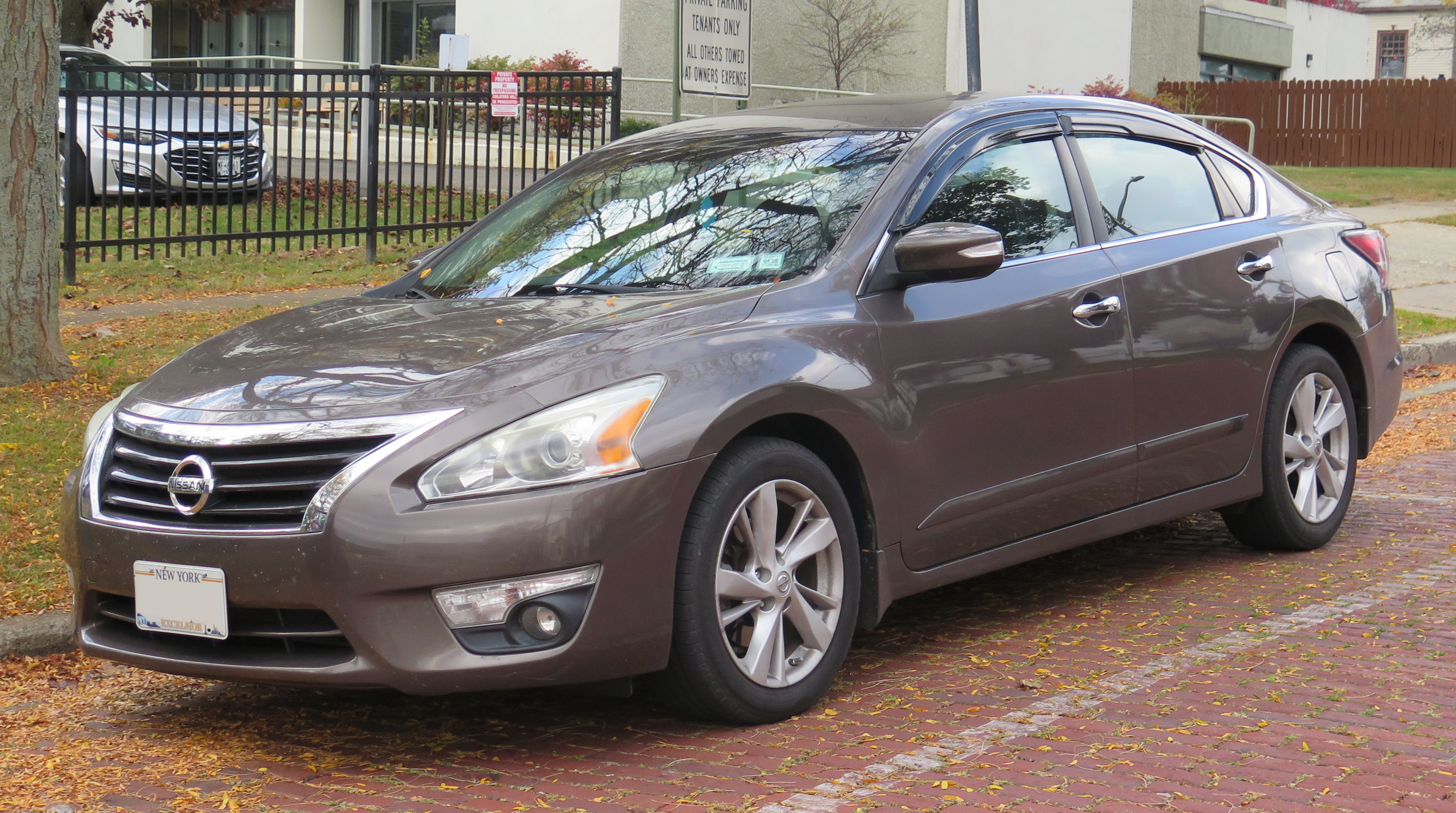

Overview
- Model code: L33
- Also called: Nissan Teana
- Production: May 2012–August 2018; 2013–2020 (outside North America and China)
- Model years: 2013–2018
- Assembly: United States: Smyrna, Tennessee; Canton, Mississippi (Nissan USA); Japan: Kanda, Fukuoka (Nissan Motor Kyushu); China: Xiangyang (DMCL); Russia: Saint Petersburg; Thailand: Samut Prakan (Nissan Motors Thailand); Malaysia: Serendah (TCMA)
- Designer: Toshiyuki Abe, Dai Sato and Giovanny Arroba

Body and chassis
- Body style: 4-door sedan
- Layout: Front-engine, front-wheel-drive Front-engine, all-wheel-drive
- Platform: Renault–Nissan D platform
- Related: Nissan Maxima; Nissan Quest; Nissan Murano; Nissan Pathfinder; Infiniti JX

Powertrain
- Engine: Gasoline: 1.6 L MR16DDT I4; 2.0 L MR20DE I4; 2.5 L QR25DE I4; 3.5 L VQ35DE V6
- Transmission: Jatco CVT8 with L gear X-Tronic CVT; Jatco CVT7 with manual mode X-Tronic CVT

Dimensions
- Wheelbase: 109.3 in (2,776 mm)
- Length: 191.3 in (4,859 mm)
- Width: 72.0 in (1,829 mm)
- Height: 57.9 in (1,471 mm)
- Curb weight: 3,153–3,373 lb (1,430–1,530 kg)

A redesigned Altima debuted at the 2012 New York International Auto Show for the 2013 model year and went on sale in July 2012. The exterior design took cues from the Ellure Concept previewed at the 2010 LA Auto Show.

It continued to offer a base 4-cylinder engine with a 3.5-liter V6 as the range-topper. Specifications for the QR25DE 2.5-liter 16-valve DOHC inline-four engine are 182 hp (136 kW) and 180 lb⋅ft (244 N⋅m), while the VQ35DE 3.5-liter 24-valve DOHC V6 remains 270 hp (201 kW) and 251 lb⋅ft (340 N⋅m). Nissan estimates the 2.5-liter fuel economy to be 27 city/38 hwy and the 3.5-liter V6 at 22 city/30 hwy thanks to its refined CVT that has been lightened by 8 lbs. Most of the major mechanical components of this generation Altima are carried over. Much of the exterior styling seems to draw familiar traits from the Nissan Maxima. For the first time, a manual transmission is not available.

Despite the larger size of the Altima compared to the previous model, the new Altima weighs about 120 pounds less. The Altima continues to be the lightest midsize sedan in its class; this is mostly due to its efficient use of ultra-high-strength steel and aluminum in areas such as the trunk, hood, and roof. The front end shares the same new corporate grille as the 2012 Versa with more angular headlights than Versa's rounded ones. It draws many styling influences from "coke bottle styling", an appearance that was popular during the 1960s and 1970s, a return to an appearance Nissan used during that time.

In the US, Nissan offers the L33 Altima in five different trims: 2.5, 2.5 S, 2.5 SV, 2.5 SL, and 3.5 SL. 3.5 S and 3.5 SV were available at launch, but discontinued for the 2015 model year. Alongside the L33 Altima sedan, the previous-generation L32 Altima coupe will continue on sale. The coupe will only be offered with the QR25DE 2.5-Liter four-cylinder rated at 175 hp (130 kW) and 180 lb⋅ft (244 N⋅m) of torque mated with a CVT. The 6-speed manual transmission is no longer available in the Altima Sedan due to slow sales. The SL model, which was once an equipment package for the Altima 2.5 S, is now separate.

Production began in late May 2012 and the car went on sale in June in the United States and in August in Canada. The Altima will also be on sale in various other markets (existing or new), particularly the Middle East where it replaces the fourth-generation L32A models, and the Australian market for the first time, replacing the Nissan Maxima J32 (Teana). The L33 Altima was discontinued in Australia and New Zealand on 5 April 2017, alongside the B17 Sylphy-based Pulsar sedan.

The Nissan Altima Coupe was discontinued due to slow sales in 2013 after the 2013 model year, which means Nissan will only focus on the sedan model for the Altima while the hybrid and coupe are discontinued.

The Advanced Drive-Assist Display was added in 2013.

In 2015 for the 2016 model year, the SR performance model returned to the US.

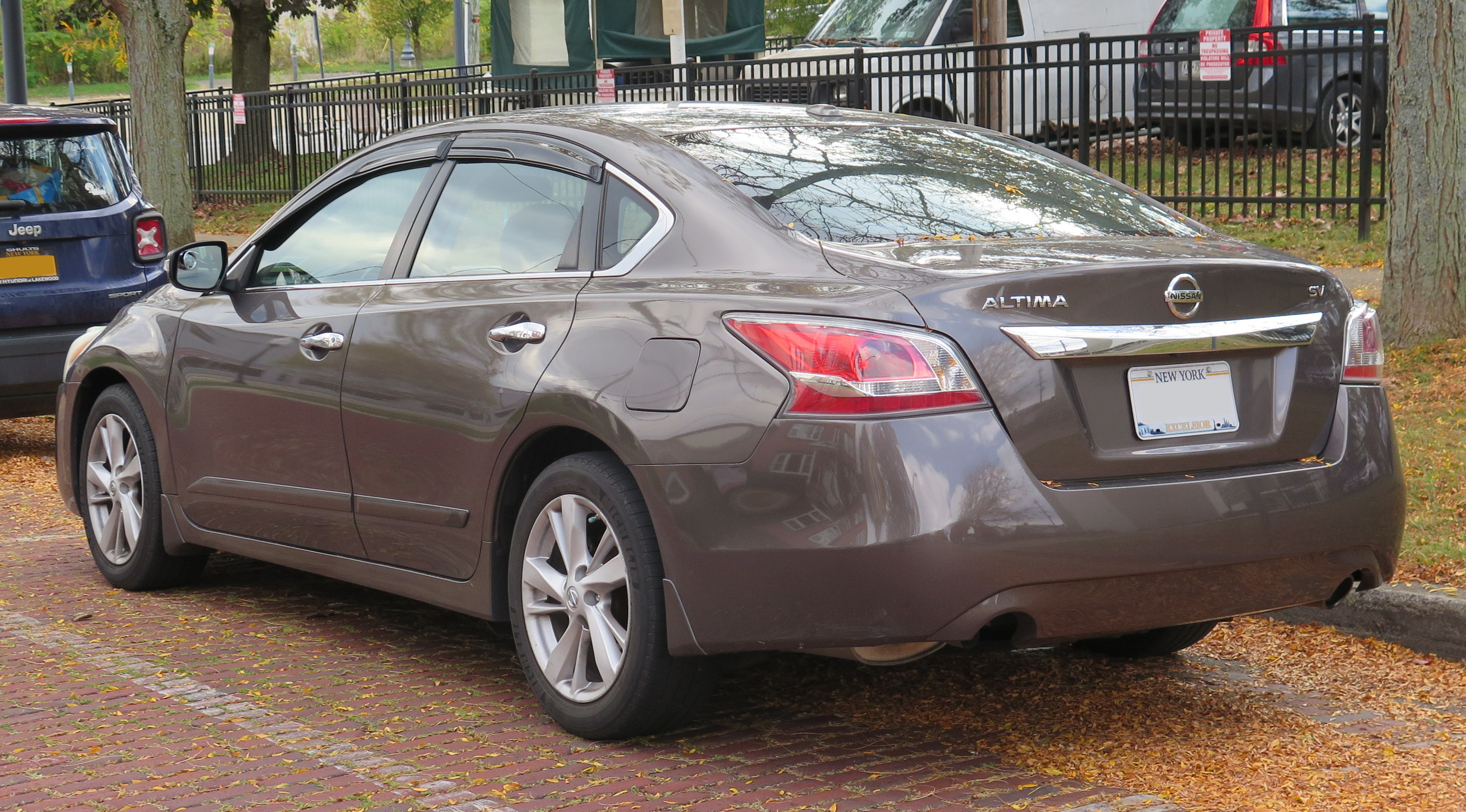
Nissan Altima (US, pre-facelift)

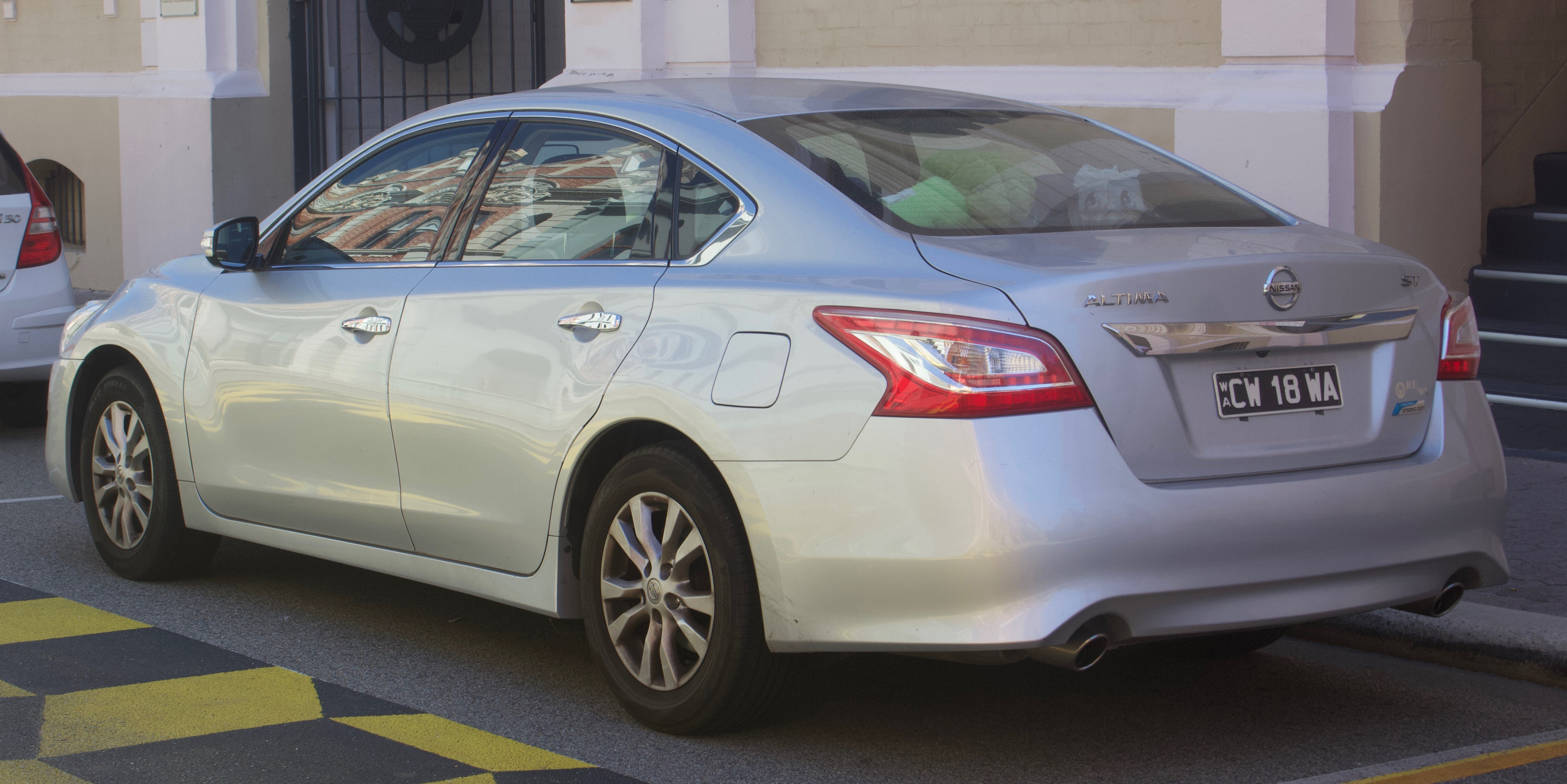
Nissan Altima ST (Australia, pre-facelift)

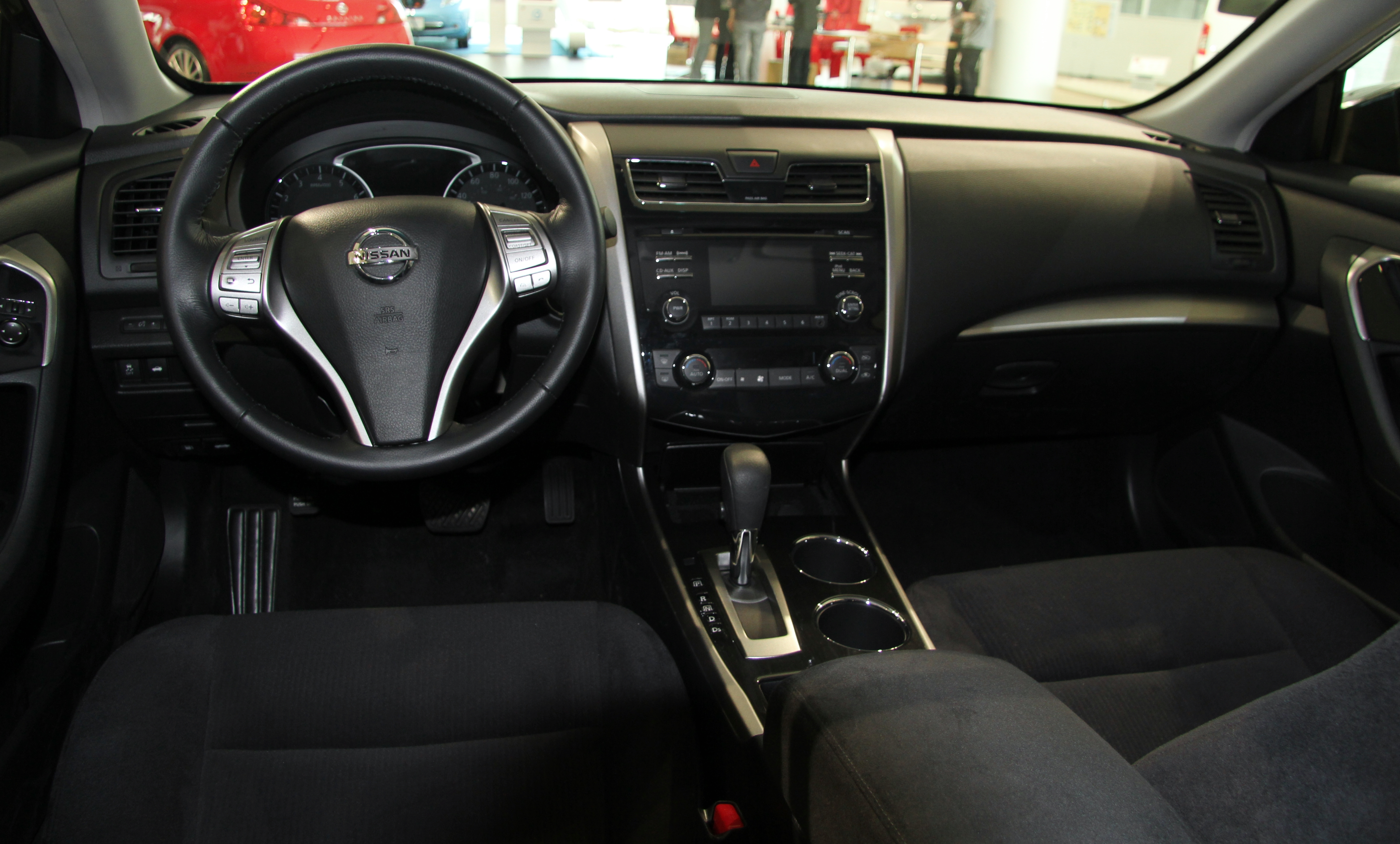
Interior

=== Nissan Teana ===
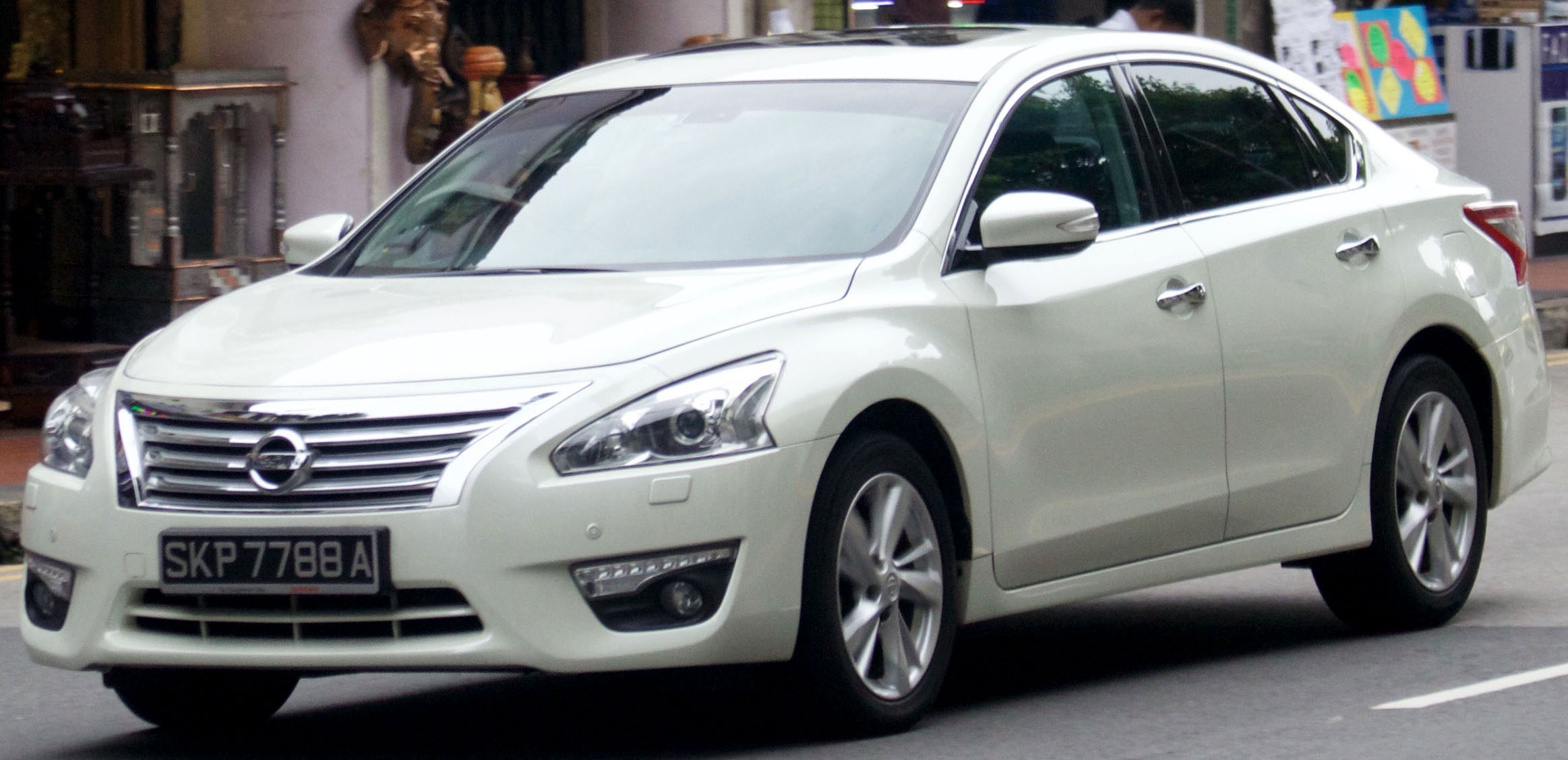
Third generation Teana (L33; pre-facelift)

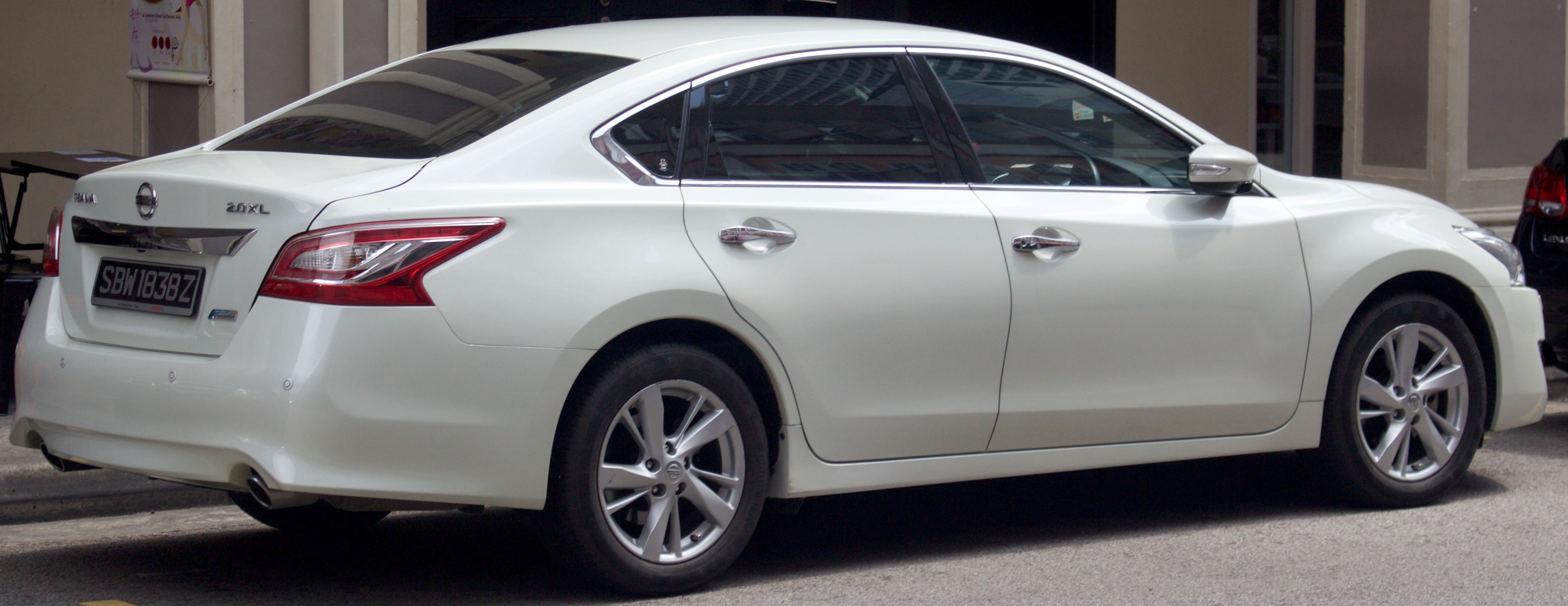
Third generation Teana (L33; pre-facelift)

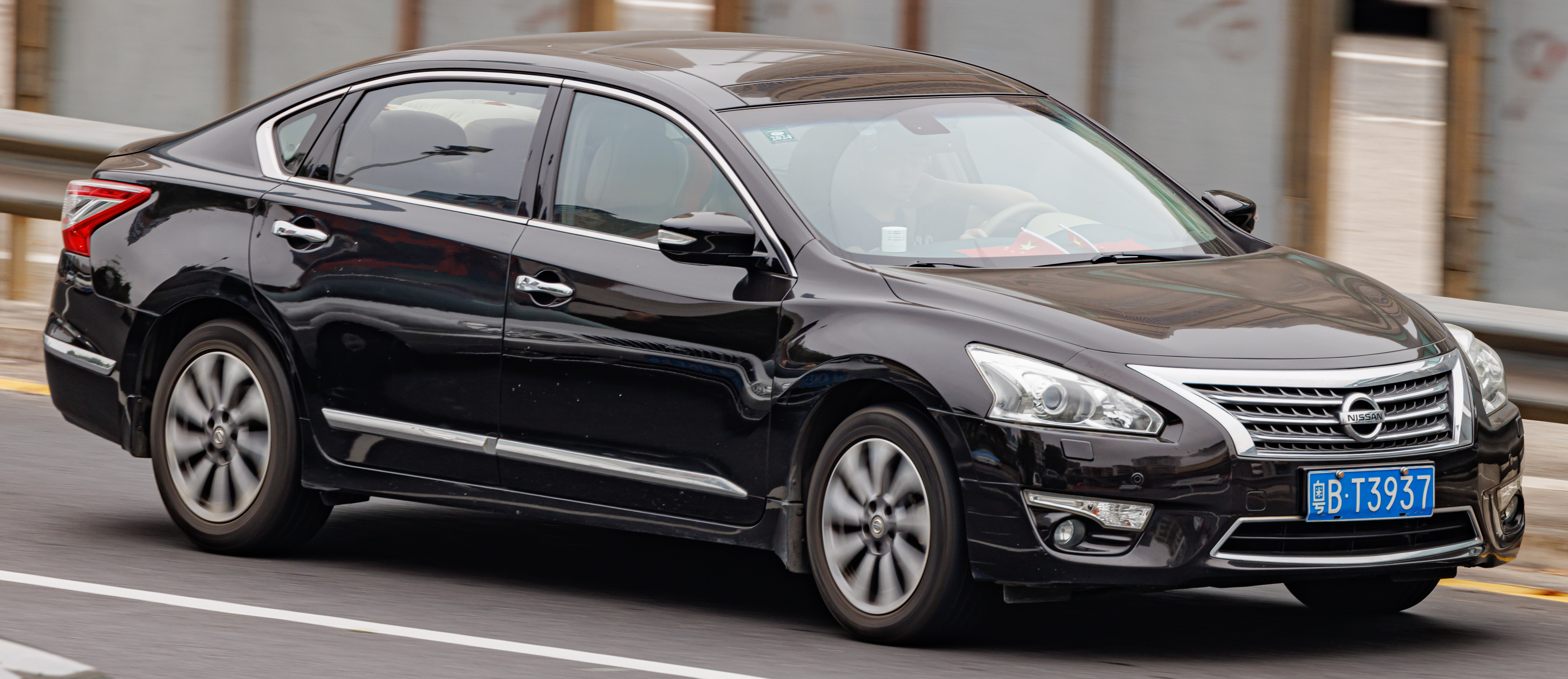
Nissan Teana VIP (China, pre-facelift)

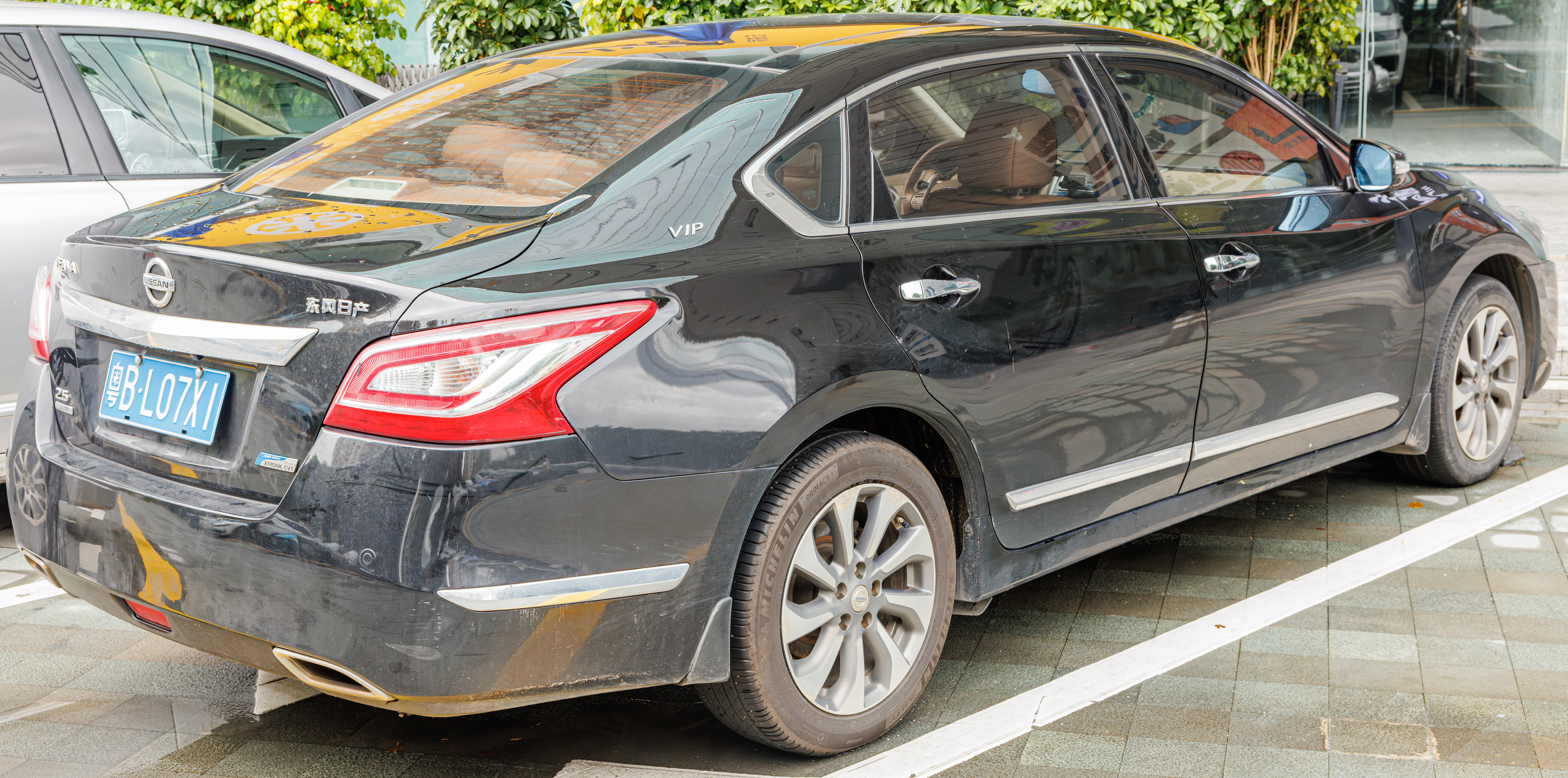
Nissan Teana VIP (China, pre-facelift)

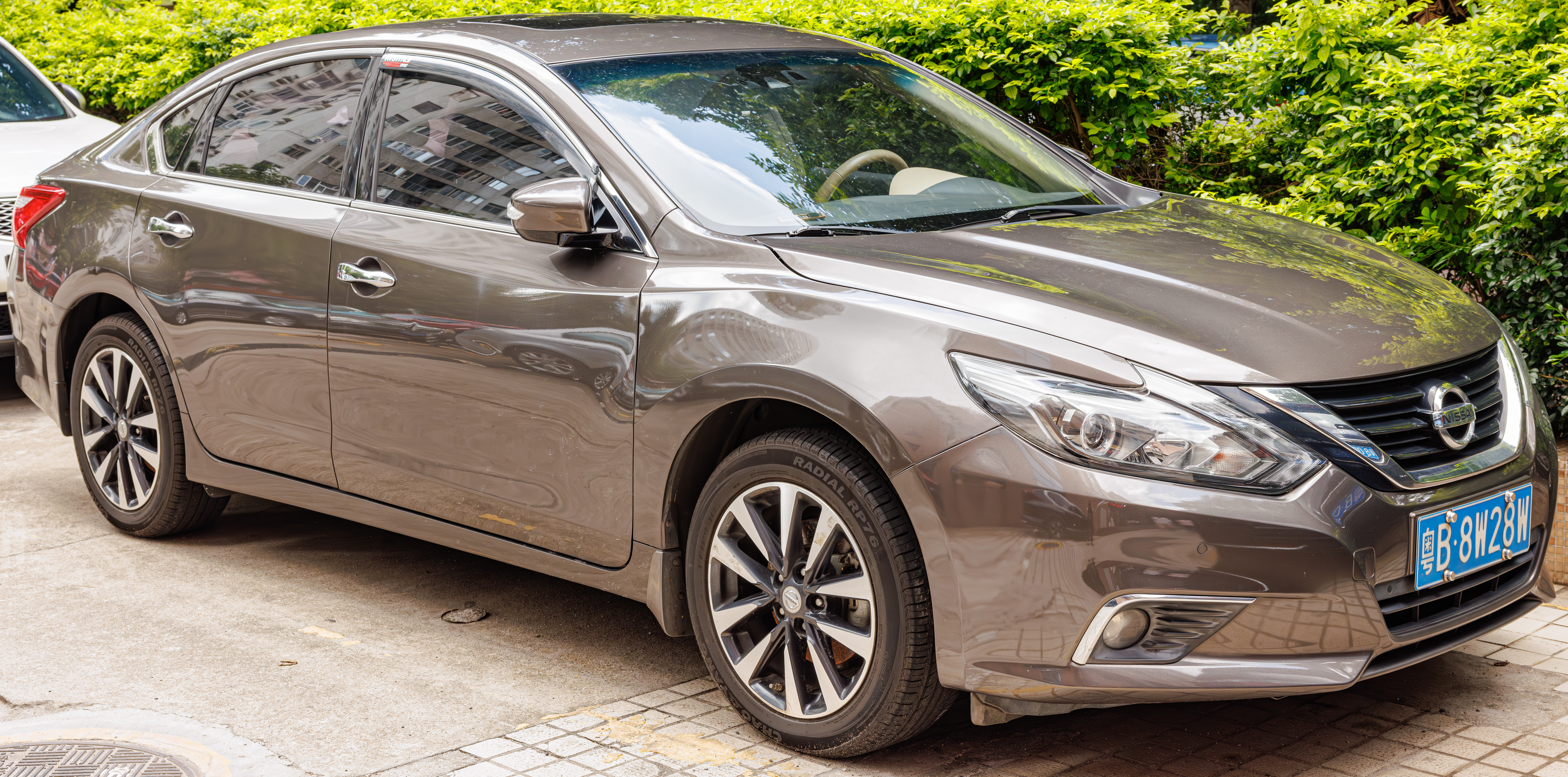
Third generation Teana (L33; facelift)

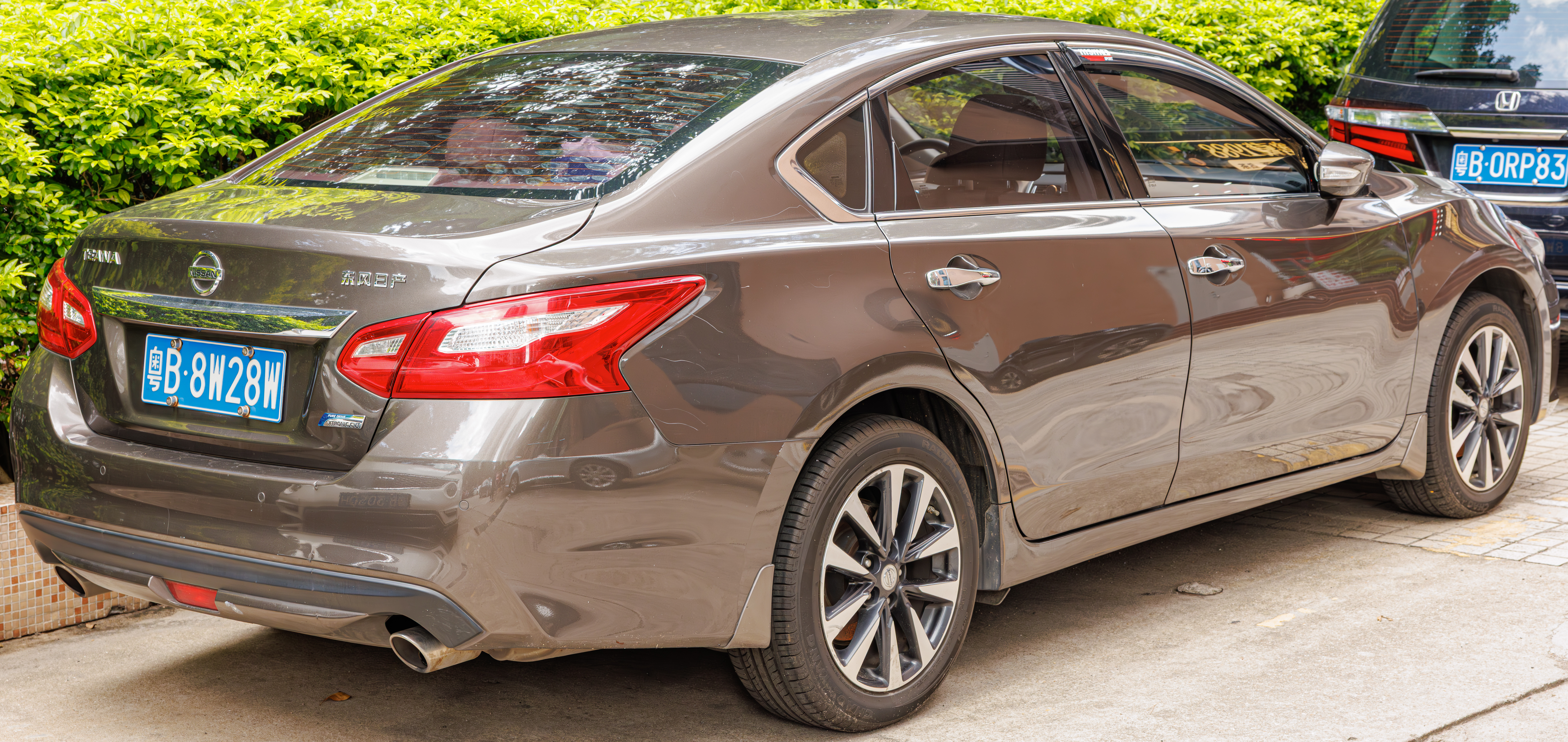
Third generation Teana (L33; facelift)

In Japan, China, and other Asian markets, the L33 Altima became the third-generation Teana.

The third generation Nissan Teana was introduced to Japan as a rebadged version of the North American Altima. In Japan, the Teana is offered in 2.5L engine with three different trims; XV, XL and XE.

It has been available in most Asian countries since its introduction.

In Thailand, the L33 Teana debuted in August 2013 where it was available with either a 2.0L engine with three variants, XE, XL, and XL Navi, or a 2.5L engine with two variants, XV and XV Navi. Five years later, the L33 Teana in Thailand received the front end of the facelifted Altima. Variants was also streamlined down to just three: 2.0XL, 2.0XL Navi and 2.5XV Navi.

In Malaysia, the L33 Teana was launched in June 2014 and it is available with either 2.0L or 2.5L engines. Three variants were available which were the 2.0XE, 2.0XL, and 2.5XV. In December 2016, two optional accessories packages became available: Nismo Aero Package and Nismo Performance Package. The Nismo Aero Package added front bumper spoilers, rear bumper spoilers, side skirts, trunk lid spoiler, and exhaust finisher. The Nismo Performance Package added all that with the Nismo Aero Package in addition to Nismo sport springs and Nismo LMX6 18-inch alloy wheels. The L33 Teana has since been discontinued in Malaysia.

In China, a longer wheelbase luxury Teana is sold as the "Teana VIP" and bears VIP logos stitched into the seats and a "VIP" badge on the trunk lid. The Teana VIP has an extended backseat door and wheelbase (+75/+125mm) and is equipped with a 9-speaker Bose surround system, rear-passenger controls, and rear-passenger video screens.

Nissan India has discontinued its Teana D-segment sedan as Teana failed to generate volumes for the carmaker in India in 2014. The company has also removed the saloon from its official website.

=== Facelift ===
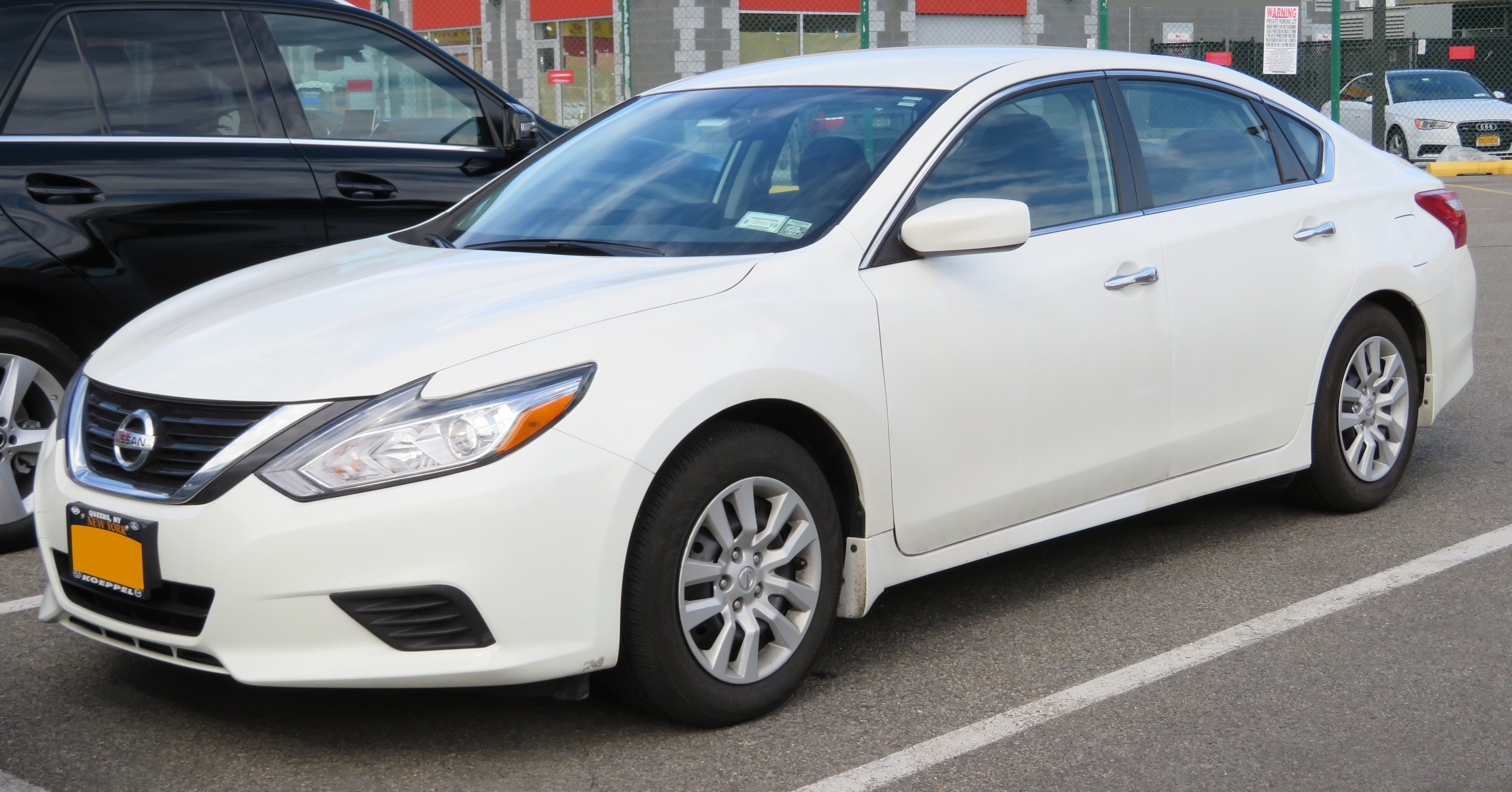
2016 Altima 2.5 S (facelift)

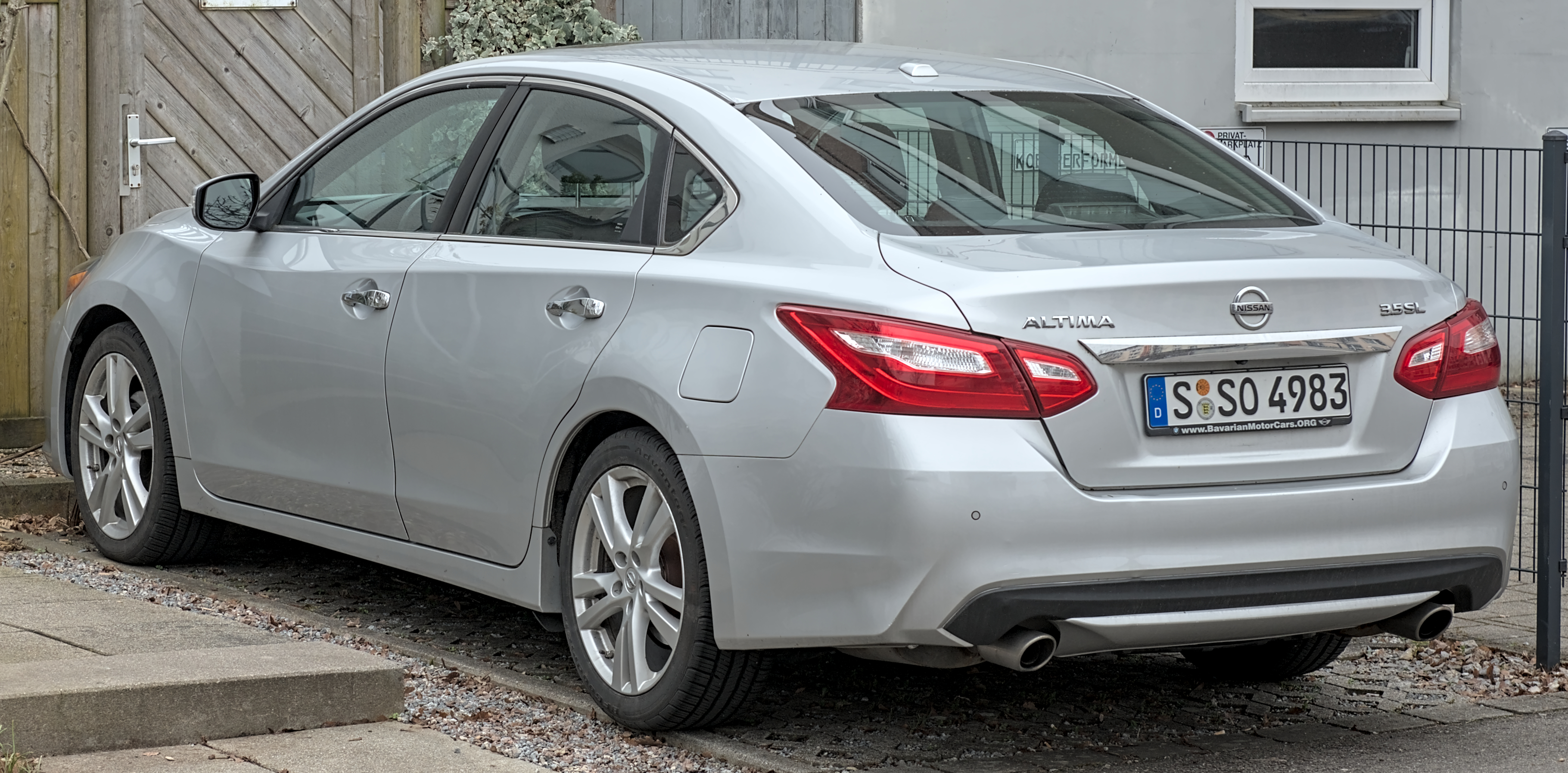
Altima 3.5 SL (facelift)

In the US, the 2016 model year received a thorough facelift including new front and rear bumpers, headlamps, and taillights, reshaped Zero Gravity front seats, steering wheel, and central console. The car was built with new cabin silencing materials and new sound-reducing windshield. A new SR trim level was also introduced. The 3.5 SR was dropped in 2017 for the 2018 model year, leaving the 2.5 SR as the only available SR trim level.

For 2018, the 2.5 SR trim level in the US received two new "Special Edition" packages, which are the 2.5 SR Special Edition and the 2.5 SR Midnight Edition.

Also for 2018, the previously base 2.5 trim was discontinued, which now meant that the 2.5 S became the new "base" trim of the Altima. The NissanConnect Infotainment System is revised, adding in the standard Apple CarPlay and Android Auto connectivity and a redesigned user interface.

The facelifted Teana was launched in China in July 2016 and Thailand in November 2018. The Thai-market facelifted Teana retained the pre-facelift Teana rear end.

=== Reception ===
In a 2012 comparison test by Motor Trend in the US, the Nissan Altima 2.5 SV came in fourth place out of six cars behind the first place Volkswagen Passat, second place Honda Accord, and third place Ford Fusion.

This was followed by a third-place showing in a comparison done by the Car and Driver team. This was a series of three comparison tests involving mid-size sedans. In this particular test, four cars were tested. It consisted of the all-new Ford Fusion and Honda Accord as well as the Nissan Altima. The Volkswagen Passat was included in the test as it won the first round of mid-sized sedan comparison. In that round, it won decisively against the Chevrolet Malibu, Toyota Camry, Hyundai Sonata, and Kia Optima. However, the Passat only managed last in the 2nd round being led by the Altima (3rd), Fusion (2nd) and the Accord (1st). This is followed by the final round where the Mazda 6 won against the Honda Accord.

More recently, in a comparison test conducted by Edmunds.com, the Nissan Altima beat out the Honda Accord and the Mazda6 to win 1st place. It is stated that the Altima is good in almost everything with only minor deficiencies. It drives well, is entertaining on twisty roads, has comfortable seats, and remains quiet on highways. It is the least expensive but doesn't feel like it. The mileage figures only add to its high appeal.

Since its launch, the Altima has accumulated several accolades including being named to Kelley Blue Book's Top 10 best new sedans under $25,000, Kiplinger's Personal Finance best new model in class and Edmund's top recommended sedans.

=== Motorsports ===
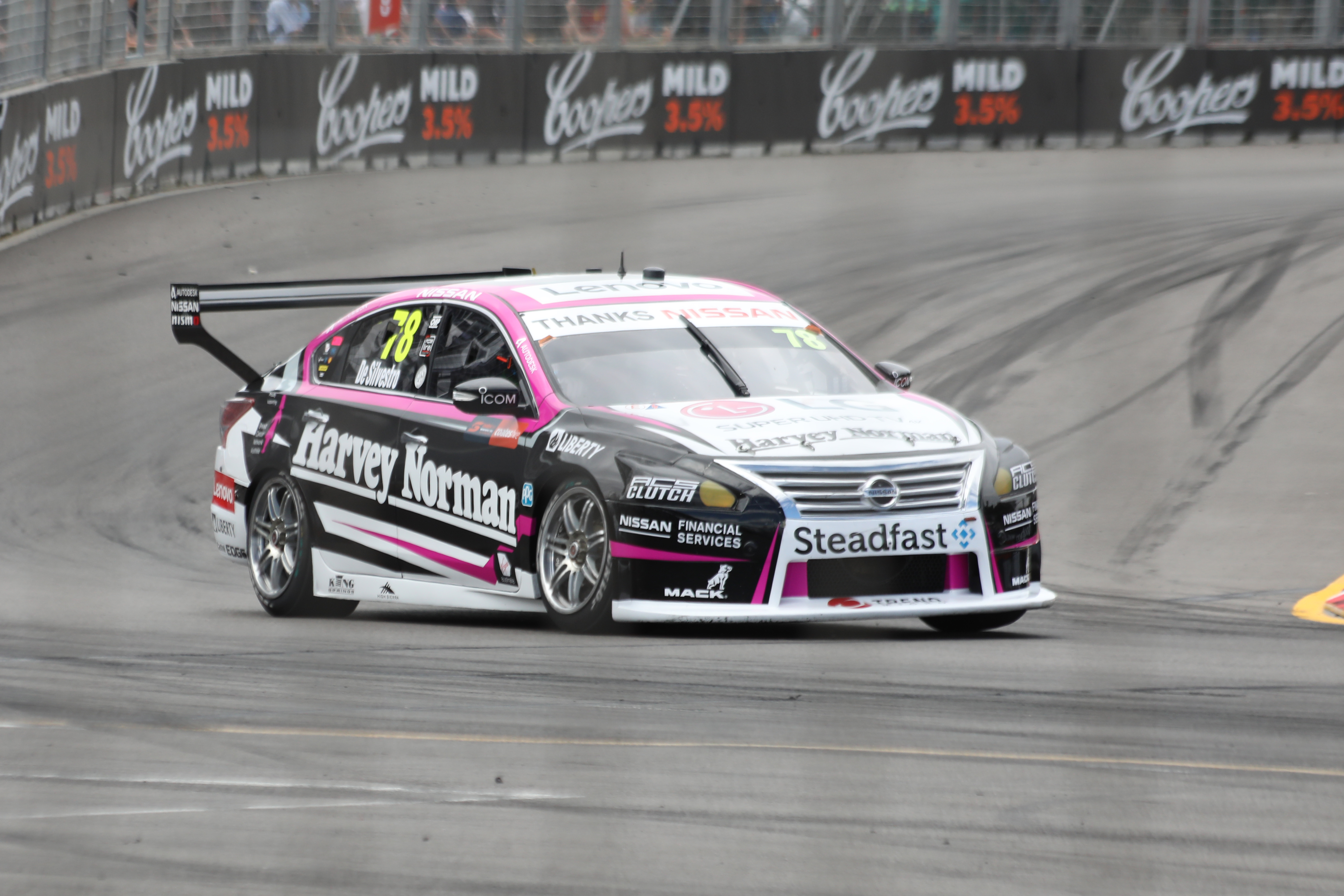
Simona de Silvestro at the 2018 Newcastle 500.

In 2012, Kelly Racing announced that it would enter four custom Nissan Altima race cars into the 2013 International V8 Supercars Championship. The car was revealed in October 2012 and was the first car to be homologated for the New Generation V8 Supercar regulations, which were to be used in the V8 Supercars Championship from 2013 onwards. It was the first time Nissan had raced in the series since 1992 when Nissan's Skyline GT-R was forced out of racing due to regulation changes. The team has scored three race wins since moving to Nissan, with James Moffat in 2013, Michael Caruso in 2016 and Rick Kelly in 2018. Moffat and co-driver Taz Douglas finished on the podium at the 2014 Supercheap Auto Bathurst 1000, and the team has taken numerous other podium finishes.

2019 marked the last season in which Kelly Racing campaigned Altimas in the Supercars Championship.

The cars were also used racing in the Dunlop Super2 Series from 2017 to 2023 & 2024 in the Super3 Series Class by MW Motorsport, in 2021 & 2022 by Grove Racing & Partially by Kelly Racing, AIM Motorsport, Ryan McLeod Racing & Team Johnson in the Super3 Series Class in 2023. Bryce Fullwood would win the Drivers Championship in the 2019 Super2 Series & Thomas Randle also winning the Drivers Championship in the 2020 Super2 Series with the Nissan Altima L33. Cody Burcher also won the Drivers' Championship in the Super3 Series Class in the 2024 Super2 & Super3 Series with the Nissan Altima L33 in which he would be the final drivers' champion for the Super3 Series before it became defunct after the end of the 2024 Super2 & Super3 Series Season due to low grid numbers in the Super3 Series Class.

=== Safety ===
ANCAP test results* Nissan Altima (2013)
Test	Score
Overall	5 /5 stars
Frontal offset	15.42/16
Side impact	16/16
Pole	2/2
Seat belt reminders	3/3
Whiplash protection	Good
Pedestrian protection	Adequate
Electronic stability control	Standard

ASEAN NCAP test results Nissan Teana (2014)
Test	Points	Stars
Adult occupant:	16.00	5 /5 stars
Child occupant:	88%	5 /5 stars
Safety assist:	NA	

== Sixth generation (L34; 2018) ==
Sixth generation
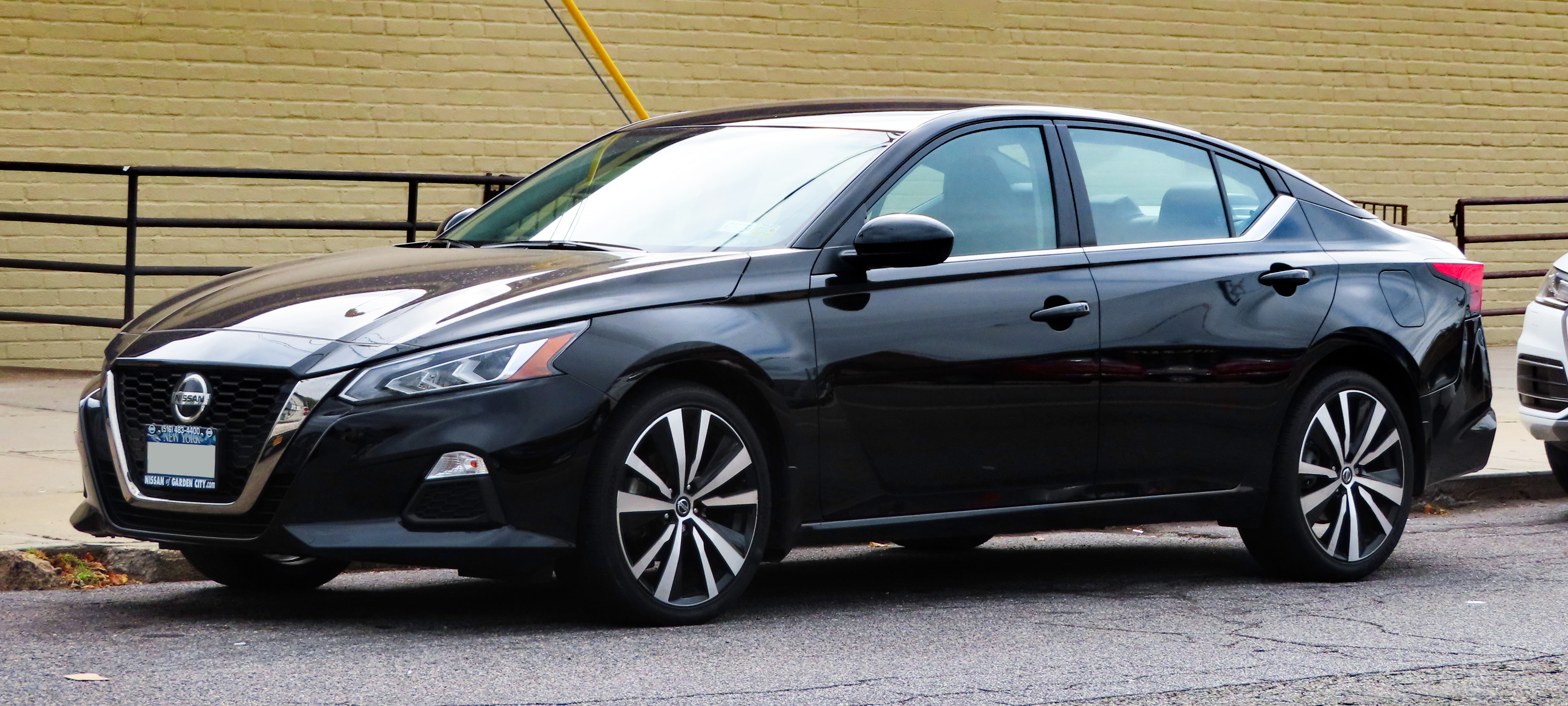
- 2019 Nissan Altima SR (US)

Overview
- Model code: L34
- Also called: Nissan Teana (China, 2025–present)
- Production: August 2018 – present
- Model years: 2019–present (US); 2019–2025 (Canada); 2019–present (China)
- Assembly: United States: Smyrna, Tennessee (Nissan Smyrna Assembly Plant, 2018–2020); Canton, Mississippi (Canton Vehicle Assembly Plant, 2018–present); China: Xiangyang (Dongfeng Nissan)
- Designer: Teppei Kusunoki, Takashi Utsunomiya and Kenneth Lee

Body and chassis
- Body style: 4-door sedan
- Layout: Front-engine, front-wheel-drive or all-wheel-drive
- Platform: Renault–Nissan D platform

Powertrain
- Engine: Gasoline: 2.0 L MR20DD I4 (China); 2.0 L KR20DDET turbo I4 (2019–2024); 2.5 L PR25DD I4
- Transmission: Jatco CVT8 Xtronic CVT

Dimensions
- Wheelbase: 111.2 in (2,825 mm)
- Length: 193.0 in (4,901 mm); 193.7 in (4,920 mm) (Teana)
- Width: 72.8 in (1,850 mm)
- Height: 57.0 in (1,447 mm)
- Curb weight: 3,164–3,472 lb (1,435–1,575 kg)

The sixth-generation Altima debuted at the 2018 New York International Auto Show in March for the North American market, and in December 2018 for the Chinese market. Its design was previously previewed by the Nissan Vmotion 2.0 Concept, which was first showcased at the 2017 North American International Auto Show in January.

The sixth-generation Altima is available with a 188 hp (191 PS; 140 kW) 2.5-liter naturally aspirated direct-injected four-cylinder engine, 182 hp (136 kW) with available all-wheel drive, or a 248 hp (251 PS; 185 kW) 2.0-liter variable compression turbocharged four-cylinder engine (available for SR and Platinum models) that replaces the V6 powertrain in the previous generation. It is the world's first production-ready variable compression turbo engine. All engines are mated to a continuous variable transmission.

The sixth-generation Altima is equipped with Pro-Pilot Assist, Nissan Intelligent Around View Monitor, Automatic Emergency Braking with Pedestrian Detection System and Intelligent Lane Intervention. The car arrived at dealerships in the US in October 2018 and in Mexican Nissan dealerships in May 2019. In the US, the Altima is offered in five trim levels: S, SR, SV, SL, and Platinum. The base engine is available with all-wheel drive, the first for an Altima. An Edition One Special Edition model was offered exclusively to buyers who chose to pre-order their all-new Altima.

Production of the sixth-generation Altima began in Nissan's Smyrna plant on August 24, 2018, and in Canton, Mississippi, on September 27, 2018.

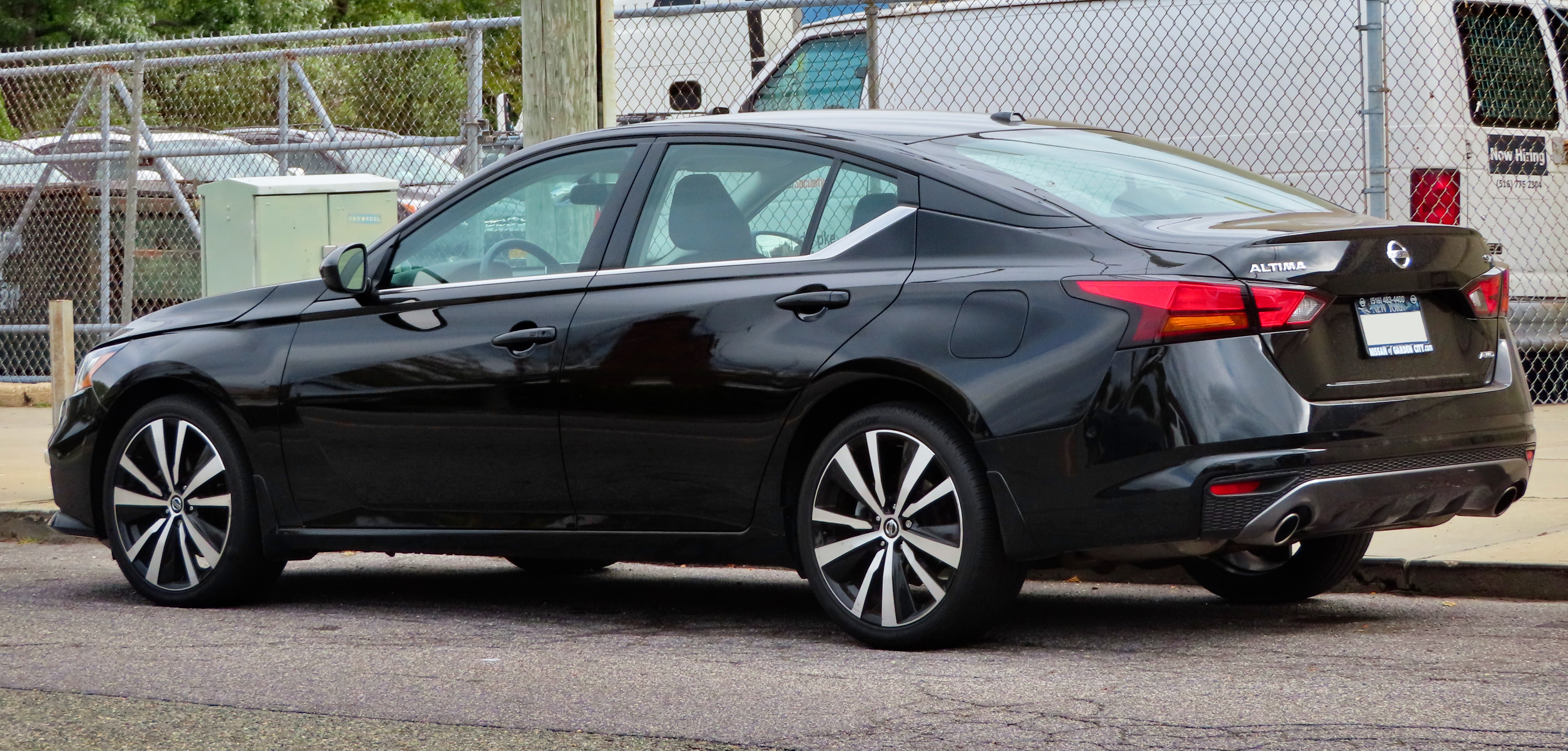
Rear view

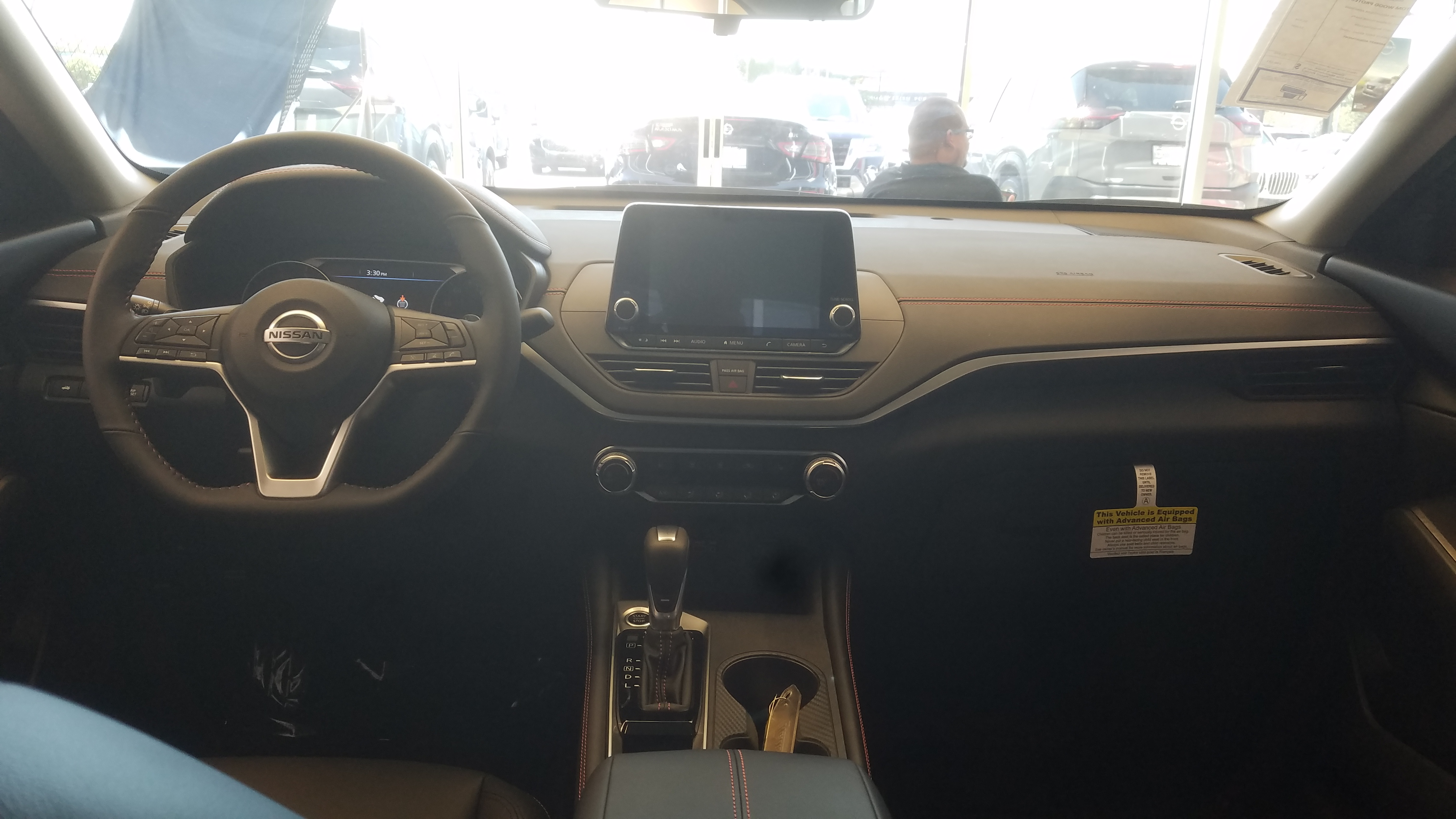
Interior

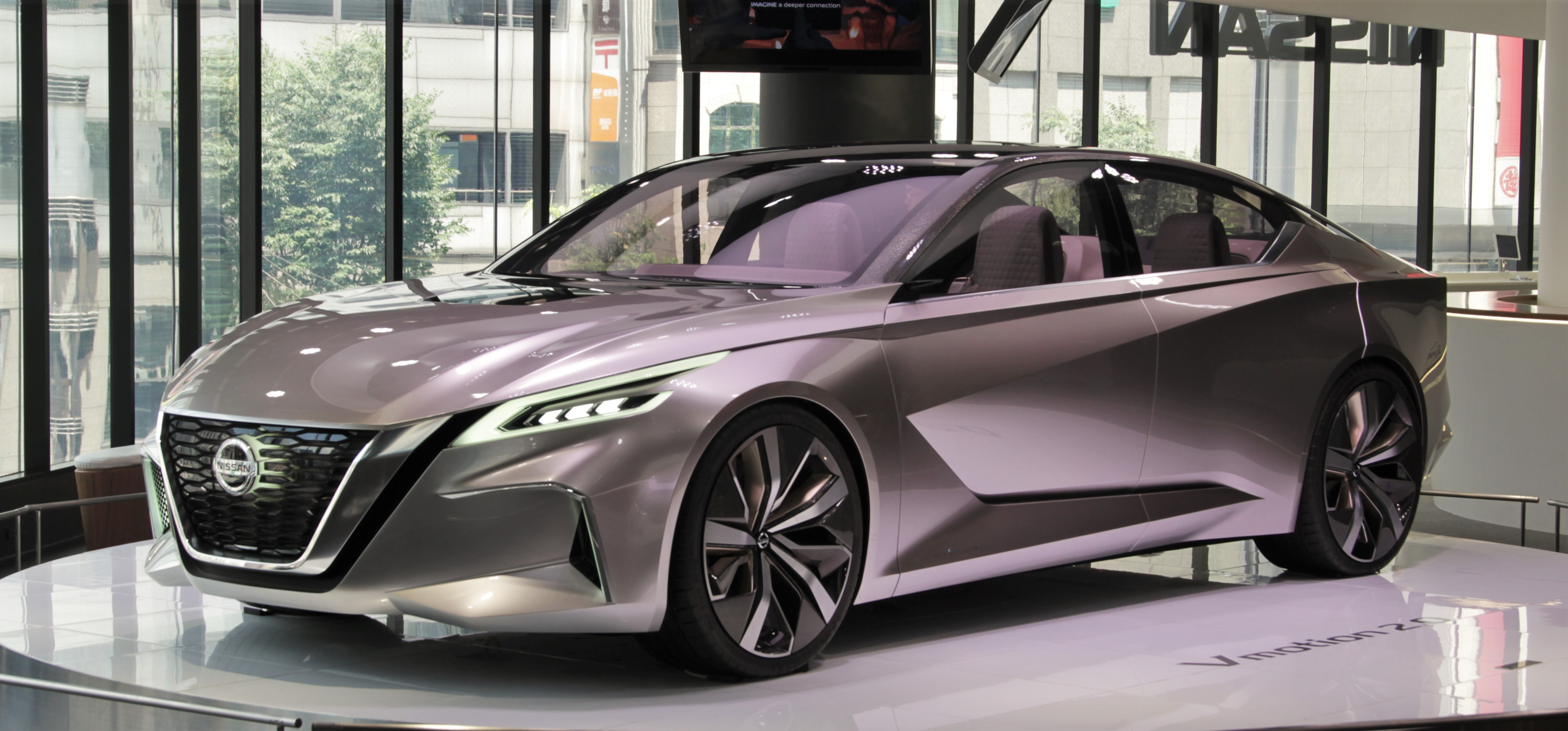
The Nissan Vmotion 2.0 Concept, which previewed the sixth-generation Altima

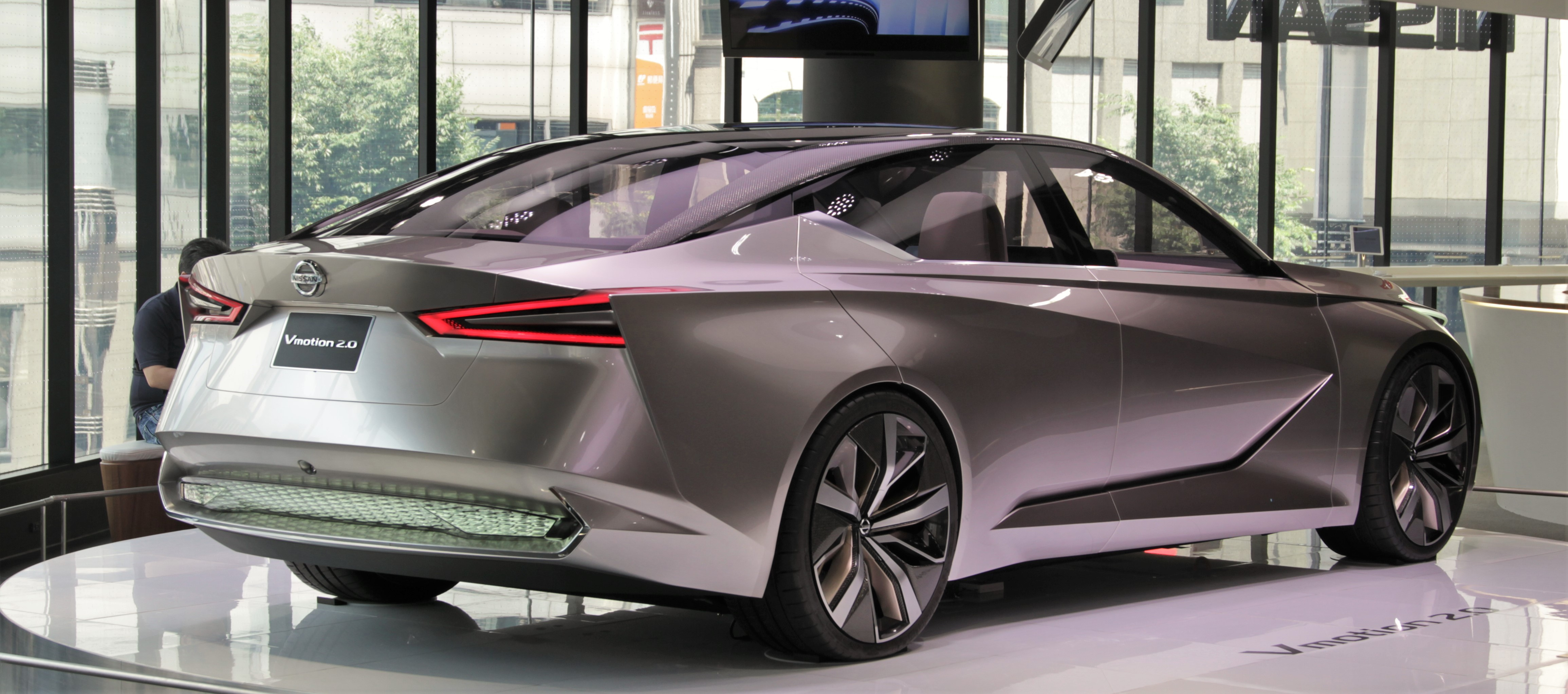
Rear view

In China, the L34 generation was originally launched as the Altima in December 2018 while retaining the original Chinese name of the Teana, Tianlai (Chinese: 天籁; pinyin: tiān lài; lit. 'heavenly music') when advertising.

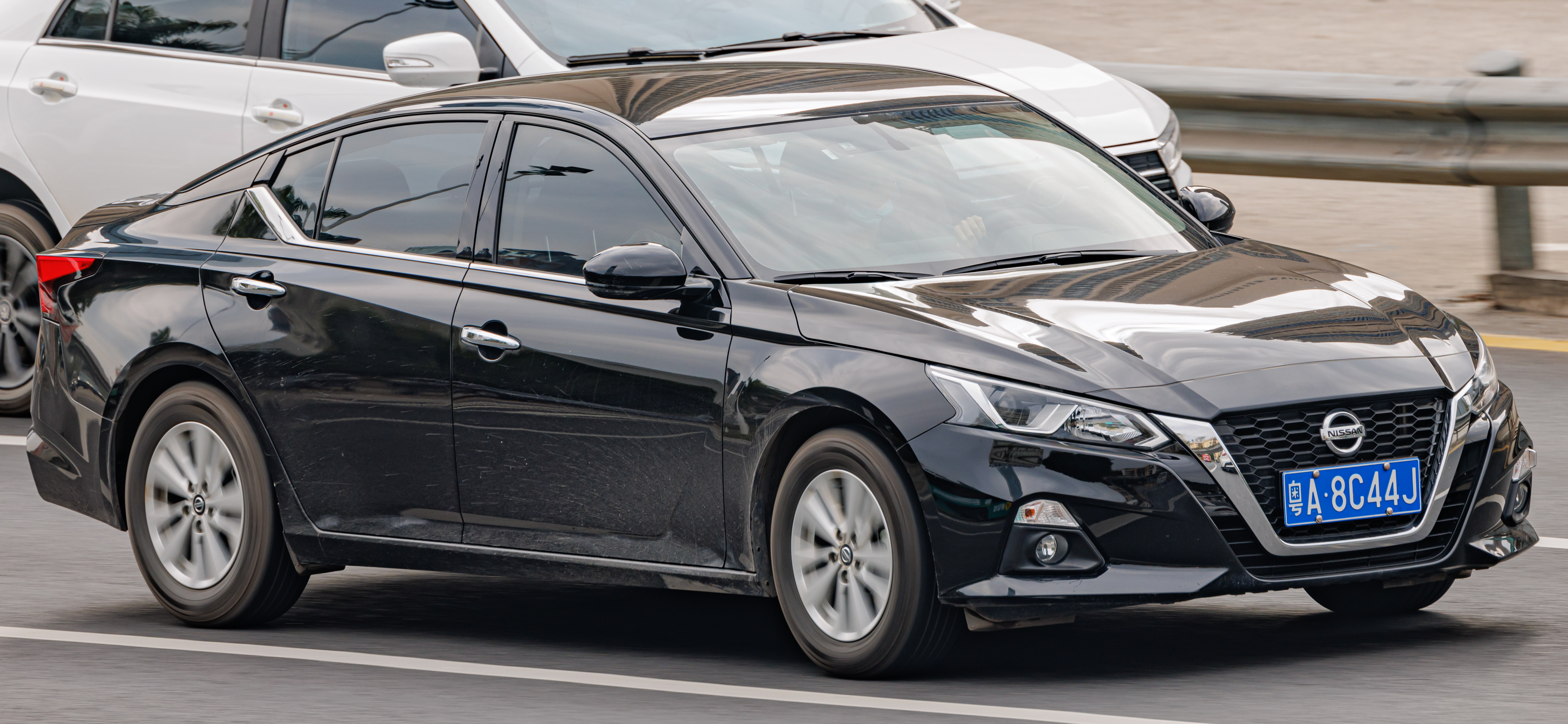
Nissan Altima by Dongfeng-Nissan

=== 2022 refresh ===
The refreshed Altima was introduced on June 9, 2022, for the 2023 model year in the North American market. It features a redesigned front fascia with new standard LED headlights and the manufacturer's new logo. The Platinum trim was discontinued along with some of its features, such as the driver's seat memory.

The Altima now features a standard 12.3-inch touchscreen in SL and SR VC-Turbo (optional in SV), replacing the previous 8-inch one and adding wireless Apple CarPlay (Android Auto still requires a wired connection). Available options include a wireless charger and a Wi-Fi hotspot. New standard safety equipment includes automatic emergency braking with pedestrian detection, rear automatic braking, lane departure warning, blind spot warning, rear cross-traffic alert, and high-beam assist.

The 2.0-liter variable compression engine was discontinued after the 2024 model year, leaving the 2.5-liter the sole remaining engine option in North America.

In 2023, reports initially emerged that Nissan would discontinue the Altima after the 2025 model year, along with the Versa in North America. Production was expected to end for the 2025 model year with the introduction of a new unnamed electric sedan for 2026. However, in December of 2025, Nissan revealed pricing and details for the 2026 Altima, although only for the United States and discontinuing the car in Canada. For 2026, the S and SL trims were dropped, leaving only the SV and SR trims; All Wheel Drive was also retained as an option.

The Altima was widely expected to be discontinued after the 2026 model year. However, in July 2026 after widespread media coverage of the Altima's discontinuation, Nissan confirmed the Altima would see a 2027 model year.

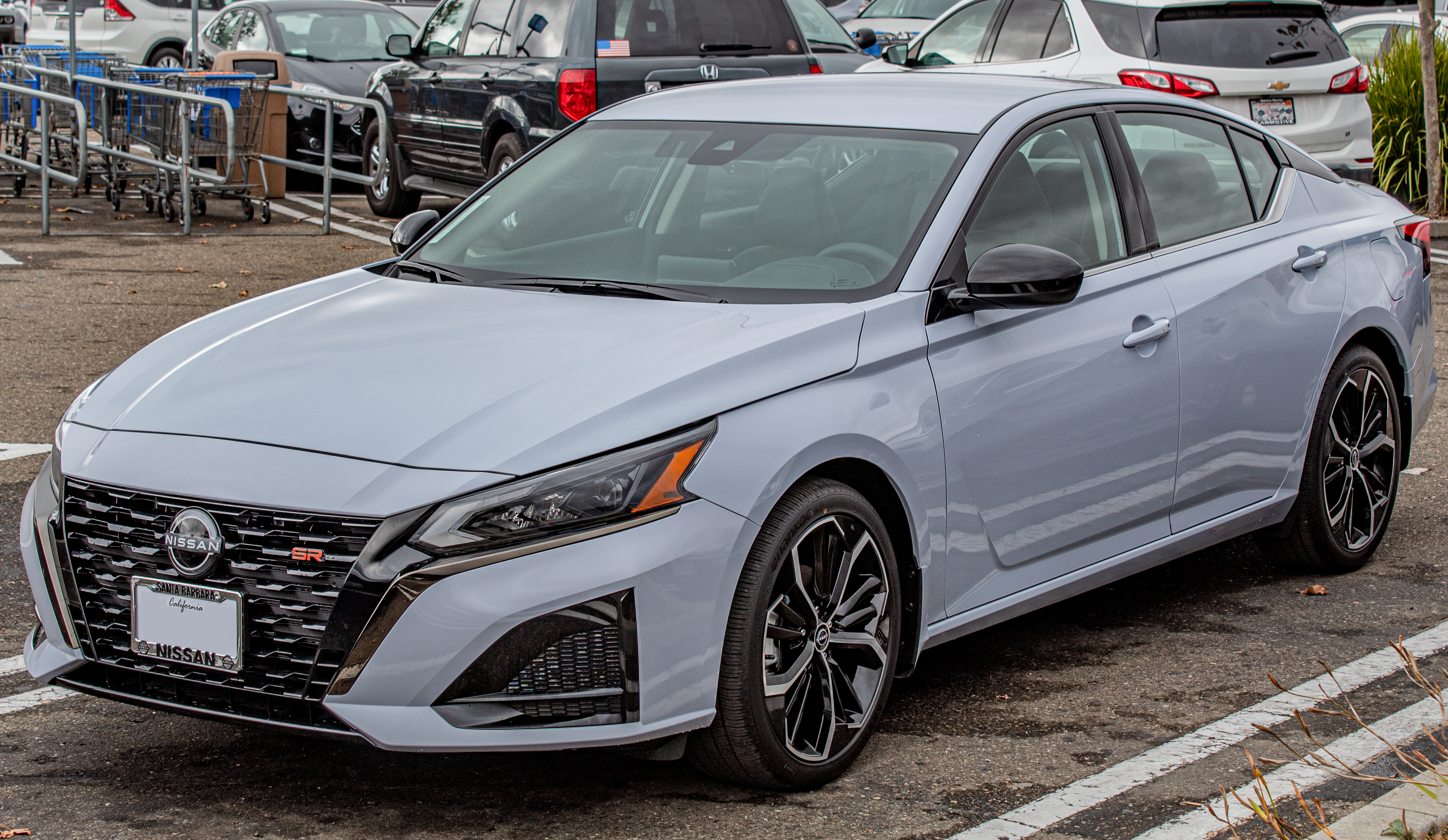
2023 Nissan Altima SR (US)

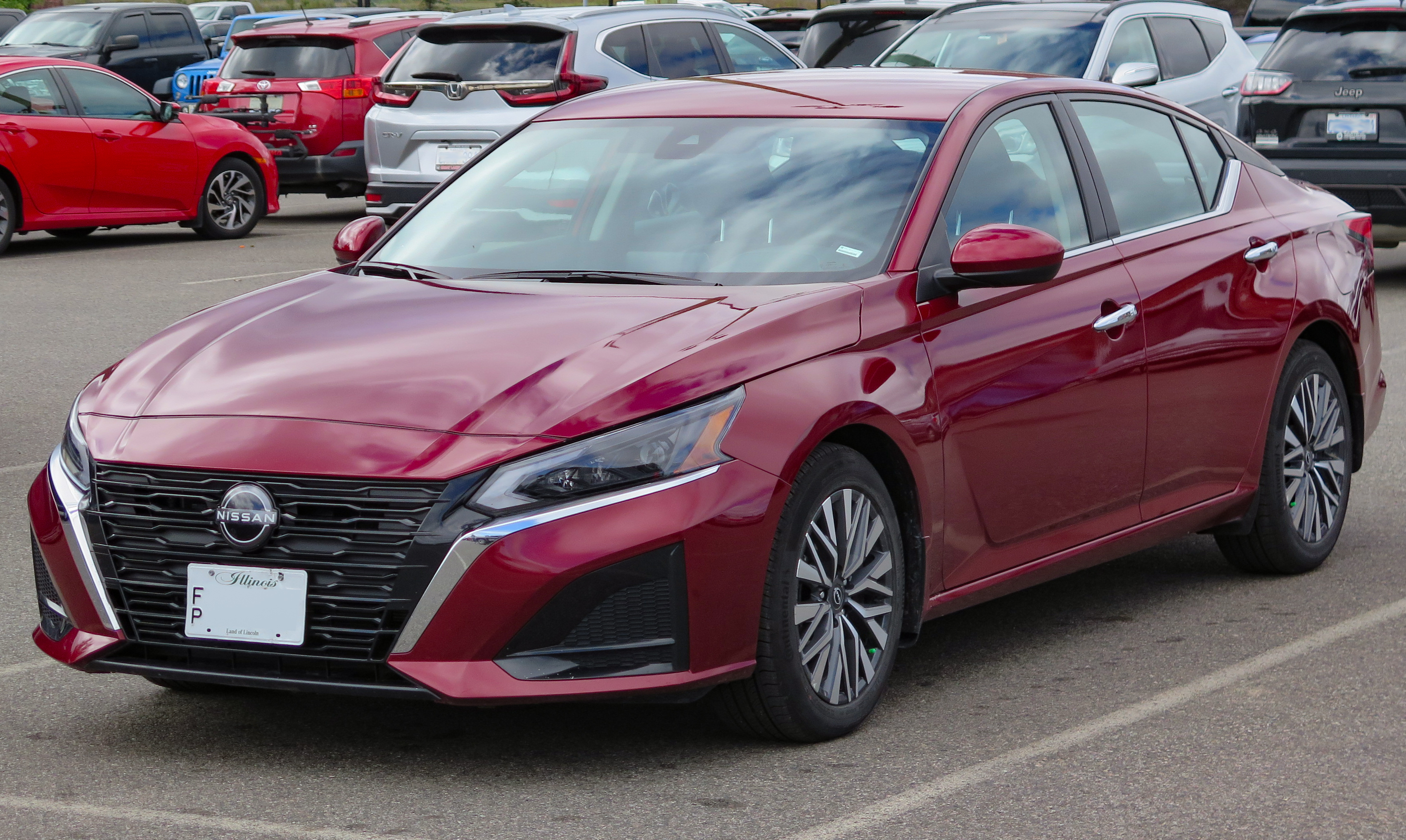
2023 Nissan Altima SV (US)

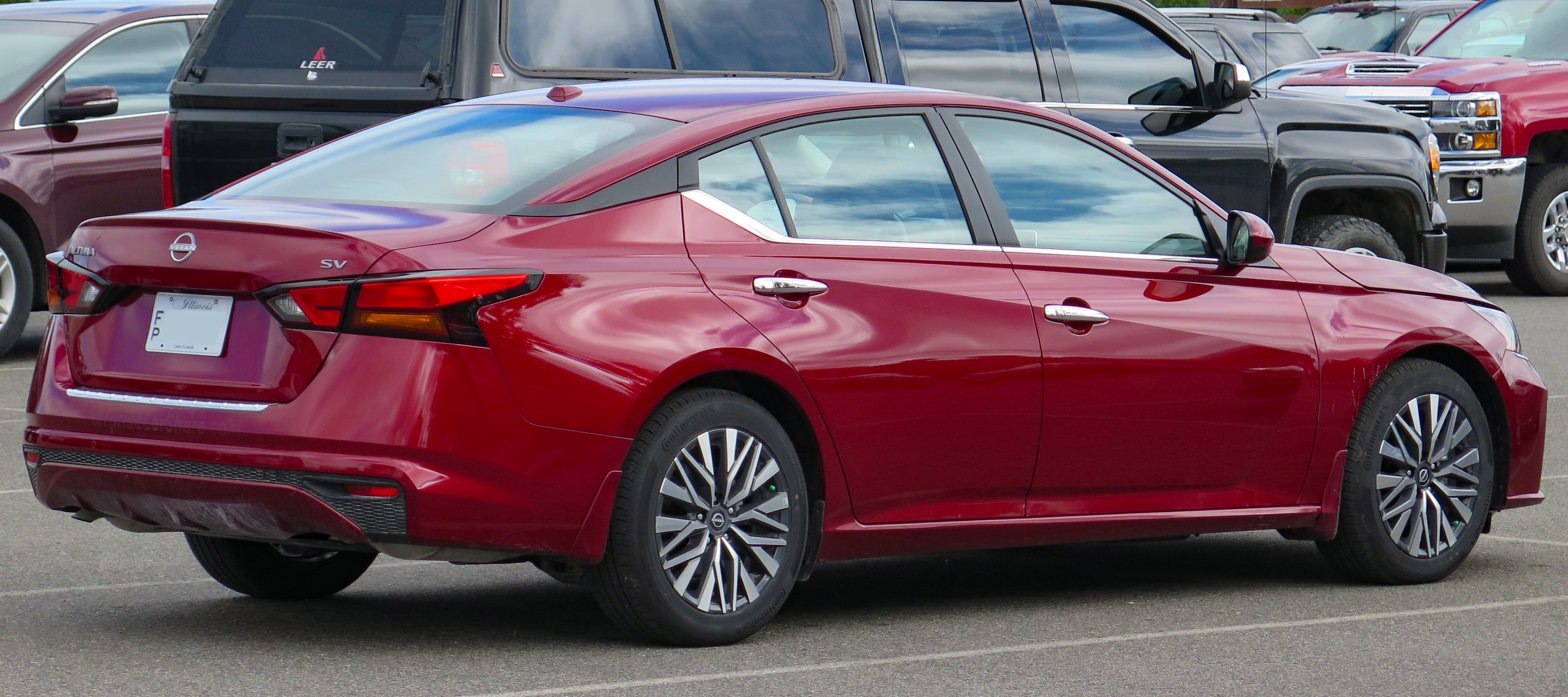
Rear view

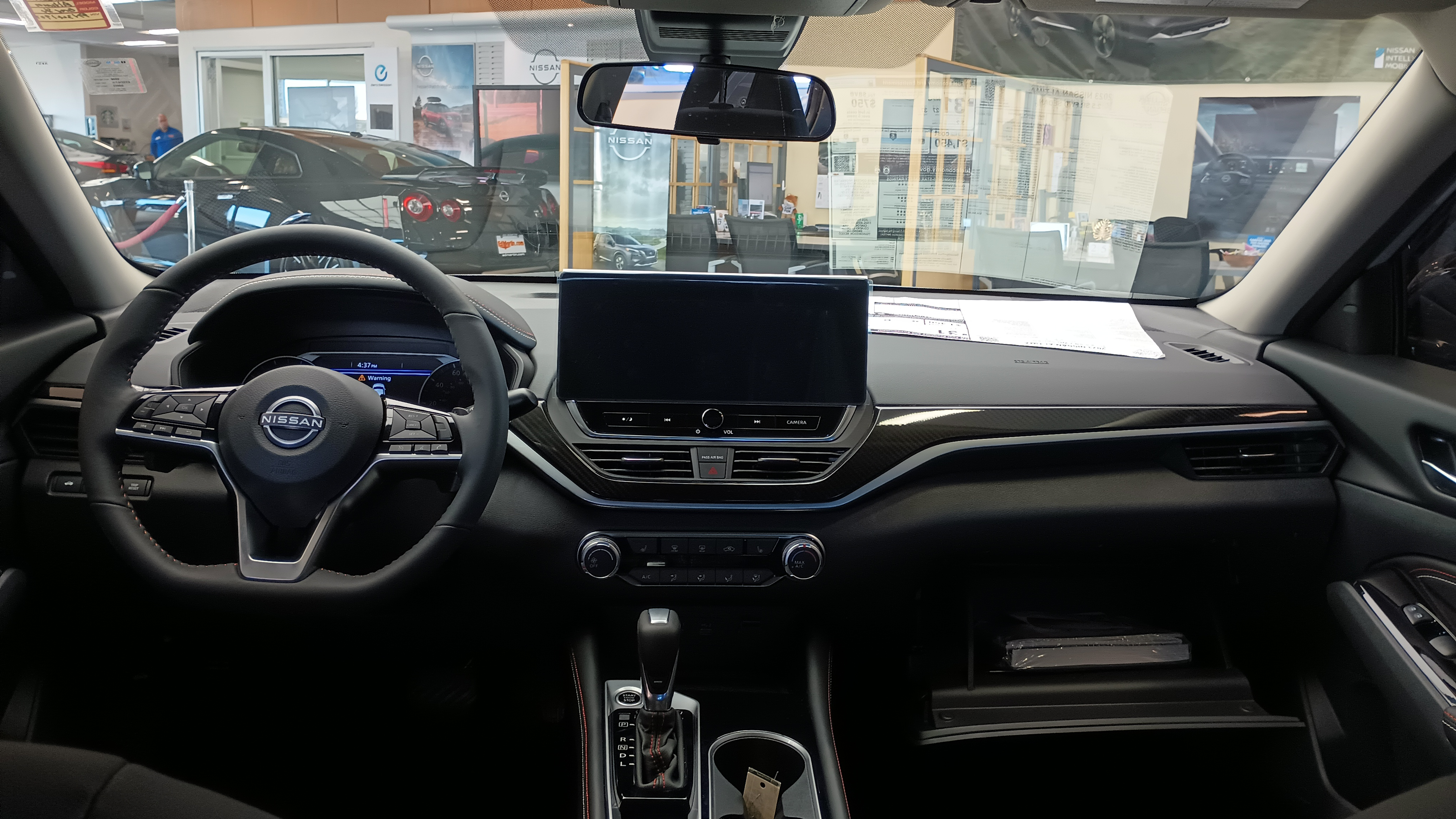
Interior (US)

In China, the Altima received a refreshed exterior design and interior in the 2022 facelift, launched in August 2022.

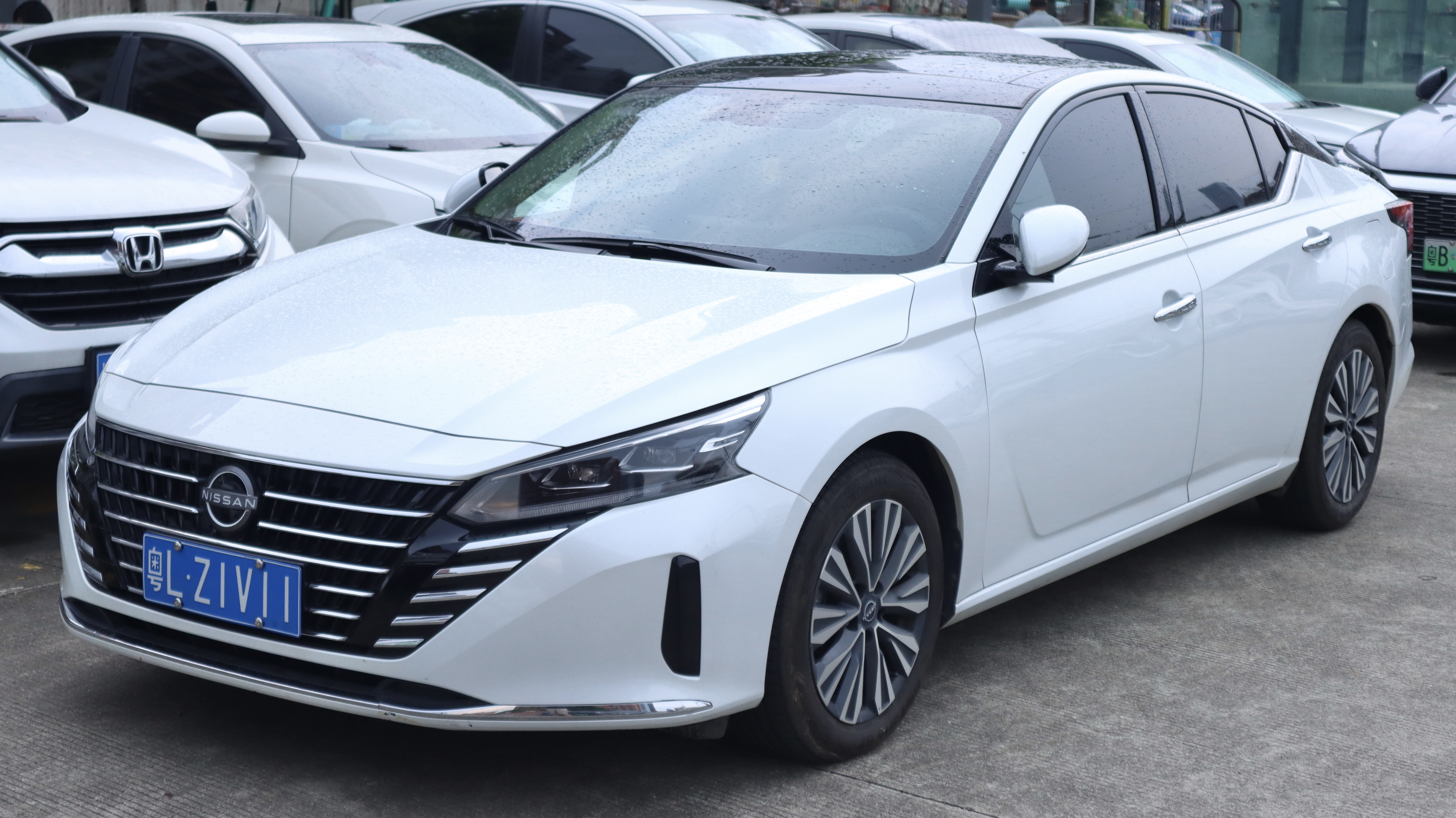
2023 Nissan Altima (China)

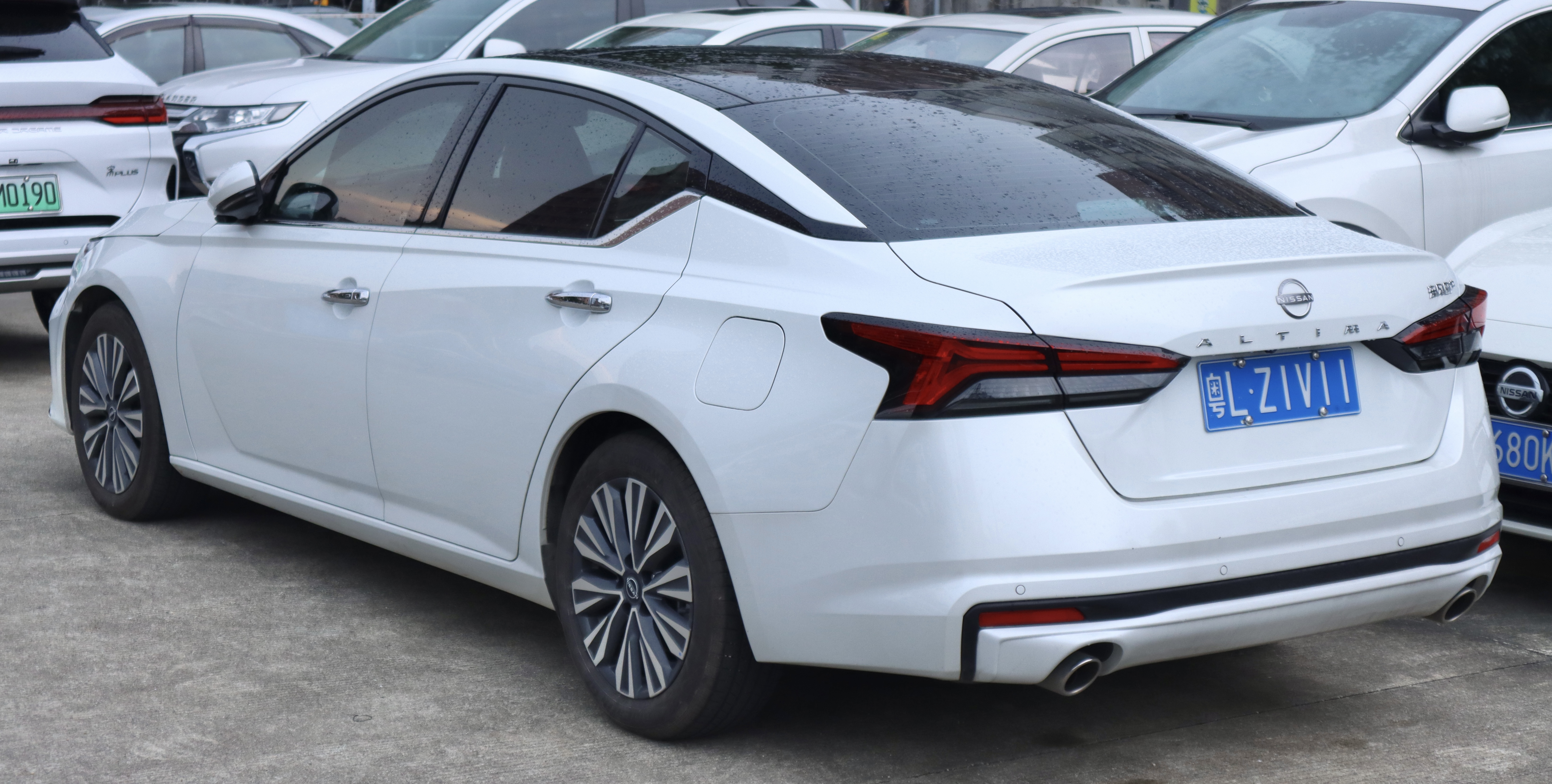
Rear view

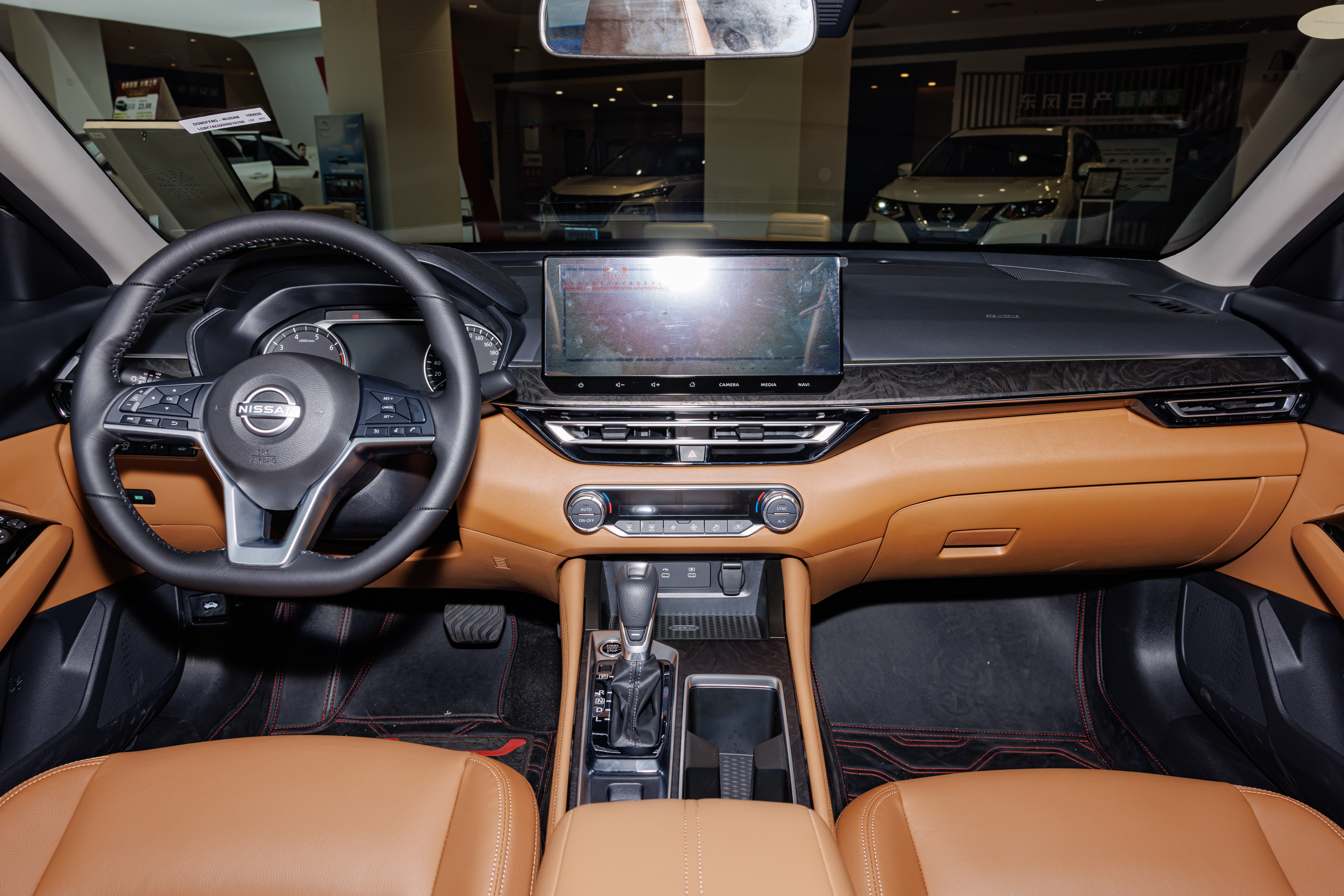
Interior (China)

=== Reviews and reception ===
NY Daily News gave a 161/190 points score and an overall rating of 8.5 points to the vehicle; saying that "The new Altima is better looking, better equipped, more technologically advanced, and more enjoyable to drive".

=== KR20DDET engine NHTSA investigation ===
On December 13, 2023, the NHTSA opened an investigation into customer complaints of engine failure in Nissan's KR15DDT and KR20DDET engines, the latter available as an option on the L34 Altima. The complaints allege engine failure, loss of motive power, engine knock or noise and/or metal chunks and shavings found in the oil pan of vehicles with these engines. The cause appears to be seizures and damages to the main bearings and L-links. Nissan stated that they are attempting to address these failures by changing their manufacturing process.

=== Safety ===
The 2019 Altima received a Top Safety Pick award from the IIHS, not a "Plus" award.

IIHS scores (2019 model year)
Small overlap front (Driver)	Good	
Small overlap front (Passenger)	Good	
Moderate overlap front	Good	
Side (original test)	Good	
Roof strength	Good	
Head restraints and seats	Good	
Headlights	Acceptable / Marginal	varies by trim/option
Front crash prevention (Vehicle-to-Vehicle)	Superior	optional
Front crash prevention (Vehicle-to-Vehicle)	Superior	standard
Front crash prevention (Vehicle-to-Pedestrian, day)	Advanced	
Child seat anchors (LATCH) ease of use	Good	

== Awards and recognition ==
- 2002 North American Car of the Year.
- 2010 Altima received the National Highway Traffic Safety Administration's Highest Front-Impact Crash Safety Rating (five stars).
- 2017 Nissan Altima named a Top Safety Pick by the Insurance Institute of Highway Safety.
- 2019 Nissan Altima named a finalist of the 2019 Green Car of the Year® by the Green Car Journal.

== Sales ==
Year	U.S.	Canada	Mexico		China
Year	U.S.	Canada	Sedan	Coupe	China
1992	30,659				
1993	134,791				
1994	163,138				
1995	148,172				
1996	147,910				
1997	160,000				
1998	144,451				
1999	153,525				
2000	136,971				
2001	148,345				
2002	201,822				
2003	201,240				
2004	235,889				
2005	255,371	15,069	6,802		
2006	232,457	13,997	6,586		
2007	284,762	17,126	6,786	341	
2008	269,668	16,676	4,739	474	
2009	203,568	13,852	2,717	286	
2010	229,263	13,425	3,790	417	
2011	268,981	12,537	2,827	220	
2012	302,934	12,793	5,246	167	
2013	320,723	10,488	4,980		
2014	335,644	9,475	4,902		
2015	333,398	7,293	5,149		
2016	307,380	7,753	3,604		
2017	254,996	6,626	2,200		
2018	209,146	5,207	1,430		
2019	209,183	3,342	1,707		
2020	137,988	1,416	723		
2021	103,777	1,217	463		
2022	139,955	1,828	419		
2023	128,030	1,577	901		88,949
2024	113,898	1,387	241		79,052
2025	93,268	1,155			55,625

In the past, about a third of Nissan Altima's sales in the U.S. went to rental fleets. High percentage of fleet sales is found to hit both used-car values and brand image negatively.
