= 2010 V8 Supercars Winton round =

2010 V8 supercar race

(Victoria (state)) 2010 V8 Supercars Winton round
Event Information
- Round 6 of 14 in the 2010 V8 Supercar Championship Series
- Date: 14–16 May 2010
- Location: Benalla, Victoria
- Venue: Winton Motor Raceway
- Weather: Fine

Results
Race 1
Distance	40 laps	120 km
Pole position	James Courtney; Dick Johnson Racing	1:21.8739
Winner	James Courtney; Dick Johnson Racing	57:49.1567
Race 2
Distance	64 laps	192 km
Pole position	Rick Kelly; Kelly Racing	1:21.8487
Winner	James Courtney; Dick Johnson Racing	1:37:31.2546

The 2010 V8 Supercars Winton round was the sixth race meeting of the 2010 V8 Supercar Championship Series. It contained Races 11 and 12 of the series and was held on the weekend of May 15–16 at Winton Motor Raceway, near Benalla, in rural Victoria.

James Courtney backed up his double win at Queensland Raceway with another double victory, moving into the lead of the championship for the first time in his V8 Supercar career.

== Results ==
Results as follows:

=== Qualifying Race 11 ===
Qualifying timesheets:

Pos	No	Name	Car	Team	Shootout	Qualifying
Pole	18	James Courtney	Ford FG Falcon	Dick Johnson Racing	1:21.8739	1:22.2503
2	2	Garth Tander	Holden VE Commodore	Holden Racing Team	1:22.0056	1:22.3491
3	5	Mark Winterbottom	Ford FG Falcon	Ford Performance Racing	1:22.1313	1:22.3755
4	6	Steven Richards	Ford FG Falcon	Ford Performance Racing	1:22.2085	1:22.3058
5	888	Craig Lowndes	Holden VE Commodore	Triple Eight Race Engineering	1:22.4243	1:22.4173
6	1	Jamie Whincup	Holden VE Commodore	Triple Eight Race Engineering	1:22.4805	1:22.2388
7	22	Will Davison	Holden VE Commodore	Holden Racing Team	1:22.5360	1:22.4217
8	17	Steven Johnson	Ford FG Falcon	Dick Johnson Racing	1:22.5403	1:22.3733
9	7	Todd Kelly	Holden VE Commodore	Kelly Racing	1:22.5506	1:22.3139
10	34	Michael Caruso	Holden VE Commodore	Garry Rogers Motorsport	1:22.6283	1:22.3296
11	55	Paul Dumbrell	Ford FG Falcon	Rod Nash Racing		1:22.4454
12	14	Jason Bright	Holden VE Commodore	Brad Jones Racing		1:22.4681
13	15	Rick Kelly	Holden VE Commodore	Kelly Racing		1:22.4710
14	47	Tim Slade	Ford FG Falcon	James Rosenberg Racing		1:22.5006
15	9	Shane van Gisbergen	Ford FG Falcon	Stone Brothers Racing		1:22.5584
16	33	Lee Holdsworth	Holden VE Commodore	Garry Rogers Motorsport		1:22.5988
17	19	Jonathon Webb	Ford FG Falcon	Tekno Autosports		1:22.6058
18	24	Fabian Coulthard	Holden VE Commodore	Walkinshaw Racing		1:22.6458
19	8	Jason Richards	Holden VE Commodore	Brad Jones Racing		1:22.6954
20	12	Dean Fiore	Ford FG Falcon	Triple F Racing		1:22.7025
21	11	Jason Bargwanna	Holden VE Commodore	Kelly Racing		1:22.7211
22	3	Tony D'Alberto	Holden VE Commodore	Tony D'Alberto Racing		1:22.7227
23	4	Alex Davison	Ford FG Falcon	Stone Brothers Racing		1:22.7870
24	51	Greg Murphy	Holden VE Commodore	Paul Morris Motorsport		1:22.8792
25	39	Russell Ingall	Holden VE Commodore	Paul Morris Motorsport		1:22.9838
26	10	Andrew Thompson	Holden VE Commodore	Walkinshaw Racing		1:23.0310
27	30	Daniel Gaunt	Holden VE Commodore	Lucas Dumbrell Motorsport		1:23.2390
28	21	Karl Reindler	Holden VE Commodore	Britek Motorsport		1:23.3511
29	16	Tony Ricciardello	Holden VE Commodore	Kelly Racing		1:24.0254

=== Race 11 ===
Race timesheets:

Pos	No	Name	Team	Laps	Time/Retired	Grid	Points
1	18	James Courtney	Dick Johnson Racing	40	57:49.1567	1	150
2	888	Craig Lowndes	Triple Eight Race Engineering	40	+3.8s	5	138
3	1	Jamie Whincup	Triple Eight Race Engineering	40	+16.4s	6	129
4	17	Steven Johnson	Dick Johnson Racing	40	+17.6s	8	120
5	9	Shane van Gisbergen	Stone Brothers Racing	40	+20.3s	15	111
6	7	Todd Kelly	Kelly Racing	40	+34.1s	9	102
7	14	Jason Bright	Brad Jones Racing	40	+35.7s	12	96
8	34	Michael Caruso	Garry Rogers Motorsport	40	+38.0s	10	90
9	3	Tony D'Alberto	Tony D'Alberto Racing	40	+38.7s	22	84
10	33	Lee Holdsworth	Garry Rogers Motorsport	40	+39.5s	16	78
11	39	Russell Ingall	Paul Morris Motorsport	40	+40.9s	25	72
12	47	Tim Slade	James Rosenberg Racing	40	+42.7s	14	69
13	51	Greg Murphy	Paul Morris Motorsport	40	+44.0s	24	66
14	6	Steven Richards	Ford Performance Racing	40	+44.4s	4	63
15	5	Mark Winterbottom	Ford Performance Racing	40	+45.4s	3	60
16	4	Alex Davison	Stone Brothers Racing	40	+48.3s	23	57
17	2	Garth Tander	Holden Racing Team	40	+50.8s	2	54
18	15	Rick Kelly	Kelly Racing	40	+51.0s	13	51
19	8	Jason Richards	Brad Jones Racing	40	+51.4s	19	48
20	24	Fabian Coulthard	Walkinshaw Racing	40	+51.9s	18	45
21	21	Karl Reindler	Britek Motorsport	40	+52.4s	28	42
22	22	Will Davison	Holden Racing Team	40	+1:00.0s	7	39
23	11	Jason Bargwanna	Kelly Racing	40	+1:04.3s	21	36
24	12	Dean Fiore	Triple F Racing	40	+1:04.4s	20	33
25	30	Daniel Gaunt	Lucas Dumbrell Motorsport	40	+1:08.3s	27	30
26	19	Jonathon Webb	Tekno Autosports	40	+1:12.4s	17	27
27	16	Tony Ricciardello	Kelly Racing	40	+1:13.0s	29	24
28	55	Paul Dumbrell	Rod Nash Racing	40	+1:28.0s	11	21
Ret	10	Andrew Thompson	Walkinshaw Racing	1		26	

=== Qualifying Race 12 ===
Qualifying timesheets:

Pos	No	Name	Car	Team	Qualifying
Pole	15	Rick Kelly	Holden VE Commodore	Kelly Racing	1:21.8487
2	1	Jamie Whincup	Holden VE Commodore	Triple Eight Race Engineering	1:21.8906
3	55	Paul Dumbrell	Ford FG Falcon	Rod Nash Racing	1:22.0181
4	888	Craig Lowndes	Holden VE Commodore	Triple Eight Race Engineering	1:22.0900
5	5	Mark Winterbottom	Ford FG Falcon	Ford Performance Racing	1:22.1160
6	18	James Courtney	Ford FG Falcon	Dick Johnson Racing	1:22.1224
7	2	Garth Tander	Holden VE Commodore	Holden Racing Team	1:22.1296
8	34	Michael Caruso	Holden VE Commodore	Garry Rogers Motorsport	1:22.1834
9	33	Lee Holdsworth	Holden VE Commodore	Garry Rogers Motorsport	1:22.1989
10	6	Steven Richards	Ford FG Falcon	Ford Performance Racing	1:22.2176
11	17	Steven Johnson	Ford FG Falcon	Dick Johnson Racing	1:22.2740
12	22	Will Davison	Holden VE Commodore	Holden Racing Team	1:22.2805
13	39	Russell Ingall	Holden VE Commodore	Paul Morris Motorsport	1:22.2864
14	12	Dean Fiore	Ford FG Falcon	Triple F Racing	1:22.3150
15	19	Jonathon Webb	Ford FG Falcon	Tekno Autosports	1:22.3195
16	51	Greg Murphy	Holden VE Commodore	Paul Morris Motorsport	1:22.3569
17	14	Jason Bright	Holden VE Commodore	Brad Jones Racing	1:22.3607
18	3	Tony D'Alberto	Holden VE Commodore	Tony D'Alberto Racing	1:22.4232
19	9	Shane van Gisbergen	Ford FG Falcon	Stone Brothers Racing	1:22.4541
20	24	Fabian Coulthard	Holden VE Commodore	Walkinshaw Racing	1:22.4545
21	4	Alex Davison	Ford FG Falcon	Stone Brothers Racing	1:22.4683
22	21	Karl Reindler	Holden VE Commodore	Britek Motorsport	1:22.6324
23	8	Jason Richards	Holden VE Commodore	Brad Jones Racing	1:22.6707
24	47	Tim Slade	Ford FG Falcon	James Rosenberg Racing	1:22.6716
25	11	Jason Bargwanna	Holden VE Commodore	Kelly Racing	1:22.6844
26	7	Todd Kelly	Holden VE Commodore	Kelly Racing	1:22.7260
27	30	Daniel Gaunt	Holden VE Commodore	Lucas Dumbrell Motorsport	1:22.9253
28	10	Andrew Thompson	Holden VE Commodore	Walkinshaw Racing	1:23.4013
29	16	Tony Ricciardello	Holden VE Commodore	Kelly Racing	1:23.4861

=== Race 12 ===
Race 12 was cut short by three laps as the telecast run over.

Race timesheets:

Pos	No	Name	Team	Laps	Time/Retired	Grid	Points
1	18	James Courtney	Dick Johnson Racing	64	1:37:31.2546	6	150
2	888	Craig Lowndes	Triple Eight Race Engineering	64	+5.8s	4	138
3	33	Lee Holdsworth	Garry Rogers Motorsport	64	+7.9s	9	129
4	15	Rick Kelly	Kelly Racing	64	+8.3s	1	120
5	34	Michael Caruso	Garry Rogers Motorsport	64	+10.9s	8	111
6	5	Mark Winterbottom	Ford Performance Racing	64	+13.4s	5	102
7	47	Tim Slade	James Rosenberg Racing	64	+15.0s	24	96
8	2	Garth Tander	Holden Racing Team	64	+15.5s	7	90
9	3	Tony D'Alberto	Tony D'Alberto Racing	64	+15.8s	18	84
10	55	Paul Dumbrell	Rod Nash Racing	64	+18.9s	3	78
11	19	Jonathon Webb	Tekno Autosports	64	+21.7s	15	72
12	9	Shane van Gisbergen	Stone Brothers Racing	64	+23.3s	19	69
13	8	Jason Richards	Brad Jones Racing	64	+23.4s	23	66
14	17	Steven Johnson	Dick Johnson Racing	64	+24.1s	11	63
15	51	Greg Murphy	Paul Morris Motorsport	64	+24.4s	16	60
16	39	Russell Ingall	Paul Morris Motorsport	64	+25.0s	13	57
17	4	Alex Davison	Stone Brothers Racing	64	+25.3s	21	54
18	22	Will Davison	Holden Racing Team	64	+38.4s	12	51
19	30	Daniel Gaunt	Lucas Dumbrell Motorsport	64	+48.4s	27	48
20	16	Tony Ricciardello	Kelly Racing	64	+49.9s	29	45
21	6	Steven Richards	Ford Performance Racing	64	+1:10.4s	10	42
22	7	Todd Kelly	Kelly Racing	64	+1:14.7s	26	39
23	21	Karl Reindler	Britek Motorsport	63	+ 1 lap	22	36
24	1	Jamie Whincup	Triple Eight Race Engineering	62	+ 2 laps	2	33
25	10	Andrew Thompson	Walkinshaw Racing	52	+ 12 laps	28	30
Ret	14	Jason Bright	Brad Jones Racing	52		17	
Ret	12	Dean Fiore	Triple F Racing	39		14	
Ret	11	Jason Bargwanna	Kelly Racing	36		25	
Ret	24	Fabian Coulthard	Walkinshaw Racing	34		20	

== Standings ==
After race 12 of 26

Pos	Name	Team	Points
1	James Courtney	Dick Johnson Racing	1467
2	Jamie Whincup	Triple Eight Race Engineering	1353
3	Craig Lowndes	Triple Eight Race Engineering	1245
4	Shane van Gisbergen	Stone Brothers Racing	1164
5	Garth Tander	Holden Racing Team	1116
