= 2010 City of Ipswich 300 =

2010 V8 supercar race

(Queensland) 2010 City of Ipswich 300
Event Information
- Round 5 of 14 in the 2010 V8 Supercar Championship Series
- Date: 30 April–2 May 2010
- Location: Ipswich, Queensland
- Venue: Queensland Raceway
- Weather: Fine

Results
Race 1
| Distance | 38 laps | 120 km |
| Pole position | Garth Tander; Holden Racing Team | 1:09.8526 |
| Winner | James Courtney; Dick Johnson Racing | 46:13.2975 |
Race 2
| Distance | 65 laps | 200 km |
| Pole position | Jamie Whincup; Triple Eight Race Engineering | 1:09.7934 |
| Winner | James Courtney; Dick Johnson Racing | 1:26:25.0810 |

The 2010 City of Ipswich 300 was the fifth race meeting of the 2010 V8 Supercar Championship Series. It contained Races 9 and 10 of the series and was held on the weekend of 1–2 May at Queensland Raceway, Ipswich, Queensland.

== Background ==
The meeting appeared on early announced calendars, but was subsequently cancelled in January after V8 Supercar and circuit operators Queensland Raceways were unable to agree to terms. The Ipswich venue was later restored to the calendar in a deal brokered by Ipswich City Council mayor Paul Pisasale which saw the Council foot the bill for some of the previously unresolvable issues. Part of the resolution saw that the event was run for the first time by V8 Supercar Events rather than the circuit operators. Crowds however were the lowest ever seen for a V8 Supercar event at this circuit, a major factor was an accident in an Australian Mini Challenge race on Saturday which saw Kane Magro's Mini tumble over the fence and into the spectator area where two spectators were injured.

== Results ==
=== Race 9 ===
==== Qualifying ====
| Pos | No | Name | Car | Team | Time |
|---|---|---|---|---|---|
| 1 | 18 | (Australia) James Courtney | Dick Johnson Racing | Ford Falcon (FG) | |
| 2 | 9 | (New Zealand) Shane van Gisbergen | Stone Brothers Racing | Ford Falcon (FG) | |
| 3 | 17 | (Australia) Steven Johnson | Dick Johnson Racing | Ford Falcon (FG) | |
| 4 | 888 | (Australia) Craig Lowndes | Triple Eight Race Engineering | Holden Commodore (VE) | |
| 5 | 5 | (Australia) Mark Winterbottom | Ford Performance Racing | Ford Falcon (FG) | |
| 6 | 33 | (Australia) Lee Holdsworth | Garry Rogers Motorsport | Holden Commodore (VE) | |
| 7 | 22 | (Australia) Will Davison | Holden Racing Team | Holden Commodore (VE) | |
| 8 | 2 | (Australia) Garth Tander | Holden Racing Team | Holden Commodore (VE) | |
| 9 | 12 | (Australia) Dean Fiore | Triple F Racing | Ford Falcon (FG) | |
| 10 | 14 | (Australia) Jason Bright | Brad Jones Racing | Holden Commodore (VE) | |
| 11 | 15 | (Australia) Rick Kelly | Kelly Racing | Holden Commodore (VE) | |
| 12 | 1 | (Australia) Jamie Whincup | Triple Eight Race Engineering | Holden Commodore (VE) | |
| 13 | 19 | (Australia) Jonathon Webb | Tekno Autosports | Ford Falcon (FG) | |
| 14 | 4 | (Australia) Alex Davison | Stone Brothers Racing | Ford Falcon (FG) | |
| 15 | 6 | (New Zealand) Steven Richards | Ford Performance Racing | Ford Falcon (FG) | |
| 16 | 51 | (New Zealand) Greg Murphy | Paul Morris Motorsport | Holden Commodore (VE) | |
| 17 | 7 | (Australia) Todd Kelly | Kelly Racing | Holden Commodore (VE) | |
| 18 | 3 | (Australia) Tony D'Alberto | Tony D'Alberto Racing | Holden Commodore (VE) | |
| 19 | 34 | (Australia) Michael Caruso | Garry Rogers Motorsport | Holden Commodore (VE) | |
| 20 | 24 | (New Zealand) Fabian Coulthard | Walkinshaw Racing | Holden Commodore (VE) | |
| 21 | 30 | (New Zealand) Daniel Gaunt | Lucas Dumbrell Motorsport | Holden Commodore (VE) | |
| 22 | 55 | (Australia) Paul Dumbrell | Rod Nash Racing | Ford Falcon (FG) | |
| 23 | 8 | (New Zealand) Jason Richards | Brad Jones Racing | Holden Commodore (VE) | |
| 24 | 39 | (Australia) Russell Ingall | Paul Morris Motorsport | Holden Commodore (VE) | |
| 25 | 47 | (Australia) Tim Slade | James Rosenberg Racing | Ford Falcon (FG) | |
| 26 | 21 | (Australia) Karl Reindler | Britek Motorsport | Holden Commodore (VE) | |
| 27 | 10 | (Australia) Andrew Thompson | Walkinshaw Racing | Holden Commodore (VE) | |
| 28 | 11 | (Australia) Jason Bargwanna | Kelly Racing | Holden Commodore (VE) | |
| 29 | 16 | (Australia) Tony Ricciardello | Kelly Racing | Holden Commodore (VE) | |

==== Top ten shootout ====
| Pos | No | Name | Car | Team | Time |
|---|---|---|---|---|---|
| 1 | 2 | (Australia) Garth Tander | Holden Racing Team | Holden Commodore (VE) | 1:09.8526 |
| 2 | 18 | (Australia) James Courtney | Dick Johnson Racing | Ford Falcon (FG) | 1:09.9499 |
| 3 | 9 | (New Zealand) Shane van Gisbergen | Stone Brothers Racing | Ford Falcon (FG) | 1:09.9803 |
| 4 | 5 | (Australia) Mark Winterbottom | Ford Performance Racing | Ford Falcon (FG) | 1:10.0275 |
| 5 | 17 | (Australia) Steven Johnson | Dick Johnson Racing | Ford Falcon (FG) | 1:10.0409 |
| 6 | 33 | (Australia) Lee Holdsworth | Garry Rogers Motorsport | Holden Commodore (VE) | 1:10.2304 |
| 7 | 22 | (Australia) Will Davison | Holden Racing Team | Holden Commodore (VE) | 1:10.2772 |
| 8 | 888 | (Australia) Craig Lowndes | Triple Eight Race Engineering | Holden Commodore (VE) | 1:10.3083 |
| 9 | 14 | (Australia) Jason Bright | Brad Jones Racing | Holden Commodore (VE) | 1:10.6301 |
| 10 | 12 | (Australia) Dean Fiore | Triple F Racing | Ford Falcon (FG) | 1:10.8342 |

=== Race 10 ===
==== Qualifying ====
| Pos | No | Name | Car | Team | Time |
|---|---|---|---|---|---|
| 1 | 1 | (Australia) Jamie Whincup | Triple Eight Race Engineering | Holden Commodore (VE) | 1:09.7934 |
| 2 | 18 | (Australia) James Courtney | Dick Johnson Racing | Ford Falcon (FG) | |
| 3 | 888 | (Australia) Craig Lowndes | Triple Eight Race Engineering | Holden Commodore (VE) | |
| 4 | 9 | (New Zealand) Shane van Gisbergen | Stone Brothers Racing | Ford Falcon (FG) | |
| 5 | 33 | (Australia) Lee Holdsworth | Garry Rogers Motorsport | Holden Commodore (VE) | |
| 6 | 39 | (Australia) Russell Ingall | Paul Morris Motorsport | Holden Commodore (VE) | |
| 7 | 17 | (Australia) Steven Johnson | Dick Johnson Racing | Ford Falcon (FG) | |
| 8 | 2 | (Australia) Garth Tander | Holden Racing Team | Holden Commodore (VE) | |
| 9 | 19 | (Australia) Jonathon Webb | Tekno Autosports | Ford Falcon (FG) | |
| 10 | 6 | (New Zealand) Steven Richards | Ford Performance Racing | Ford Falcon (FG) | |
| 11 | 15 | (Australia) Rick Kelly | Kelly Racing | Holden Commodore (VE) | |
| 12 | 7 | (Australia) Todd Kelly | Kelly Racing | Holden Commodore (VE) | |
| 13 | 24 | (New Zealand) Fabian Coulthard | Walkinshaw Racing | Holden Commodore (VE) | |
| 14 | 3 | (Australia) Tony D'Alberto | Tony D'Alberto Racing | Holden Commodore (VE) | |
| 15 | 8 | (New Zealand) Jason Richards | Brad Jones Racing | Holden Commodore (VE) | |
| 16 | 14 | (Australia) Jason Bright | Brad Jones Racing | Holden Commodore (VE) | |
| 17 | 5 | (Australia) Mark Winterbottom | Ford Performance Racing | Ford Falcon (FG) | |
| 18 | 55 | (Australia) Paul Dumbrell | Rod Nash Racing | Ford Falcon (FG) | |
| 19 | 47 | (Australia) Tim Slade | James Rosenberg Racing | Ford Falcon (FG) | |
| 20 | 12 | (Australia) Dean Fiore | Triple F Racing | Ford Falcon (FG) | |
| 21 | 11 | (Australia) Jason Bargwanna | Kelly Racing | Holden Commodore (VE) | |
| 22 | 21 | (Australia) Karl Reindler | Britek Motorsport | Holden Commodore (VE) | |
| 23 | 30 | (New Zealand) Daniel Gaunt | Lucas Dumbrell Motorsport | Holden Commodore (VE) | |
| 24 | 22 | (Australia) Will Davison | Holden Racing Team | Holden Commodore (VE) | |
| 25 | 4 | (Australia) Alex Davison | Stone Brothers Racing | Ford Falcon (FG) | |
| 26 | 51 | (New Zealand) Greg Murphy | Paul Morris Motorsport | Holden Commodore (VE) | |
| 27 | 34 | (Australia) Michael Caruso | Garry Rogers Motorsport | Holden Commodore (VE) | |
| 28 | 10 | (Australia) Andrew Thompson | Walkinshaw Racing | Holden Commodore (VE) | |
| 29 | 16 | (Australia) Tony Ricciardello | Kelly Racing | Holden Commodore (VE) | |

== Standings ==
After race 10 of 26

| Pos | No. | Name | Team | Points |
|---|---|---|---|---|
| 1 | 1 | (Australia) Jamie Whincup | Triple Eight Race Engineering | 1191 |
| 2 | 18 | (Australia) James Courtney | Dick Johnson Racing | 1167 |
| 3 | 9 | (New Zealand) Shane van Gisbergen | Stone Brothers Racing | 984 |
| 4 | 2 | (Australia) Garth Tander | Holden Racing Team | 972 |
| 5 | 888 | (Australia) Craig Lowndes | Triple Eight Race Engineering | 969 |
