= 2010 Skycity Triple Crown =

2010 V8 supercar race

(Northern Territory) 2010 Skycity Triple Crown
Event Information
- Round 7 of 14 in the 2010 V8 Supercar Championship Series
- Date: 18–20 June 2010
- Location: Darwin, Northern Territory
- Venue: Hidden Valley Raceway
- Weather: Fine

Results
Race 1
Distance	42 laps	120 km
Pole position	Mark Winterbottom; Ford Performance Racing	1:09.6854
Winner	Mark Winterbottom; Ford Performance Racing	51:17.8454
Race 2
Distance	69 laps	200 km
Pole position	Alex Davison; Stone Brothers Racing	1:10.0614
Winner	Jamie Whincup; Triple Eight Race Engineering	1:24:35.0111

The 2010 Skycity Triple Crown was the seventh race meeting of the 2010 V8 Supercar Championship Series. It featured Races 13 and 14 of the series and was held on the weekend of 18–20 June at Hidden Valley Raceway, in Darwin, in the Northern Territory, Australia.

== Race 13 ==
In provisional qualifying Jason Richards returned to the scene of his 2009 pole position and took fastest away from Jamie Whincup late in the session. Into the shoot out Tim Slade surprised many by briefly topping the session until Mark Winterbottom secured pole position with Jamie Whincup second. Beside Slade in fourth was Garth Tander.

Winterbottom won the start from Whincup, Tander, Slade, Courtney, Dumbrell, Van Gisbergen and Jason Richards while Will Davison limped around the track with his newly finished Commodore stuck in gear. Dumbrell lost ground in the early running dropping to ninth. Reindler dropped out of the race with a broken steering arm after a miserable qualifying session.

Winterbottom and Whincup built a gap on the field. Winterbottom was an early race stopper, followed by teammate Paul Dumbrell. Lowndes also stopped early, while Davison pitted again still with mechanical issues. Courtney, Todd Kelly and Lee Holdsworth followed shortly. Whincup continued out in front for two laps before he stopped with Tander following. After the stops Winterbottom emerged with an enlarged lead over Whincup while the first car in Jason Richards leapt up the order. Tander rejoined just in front of Courtney and Dumbrell with Slade jumping in front of Dumbrell. Van Gisbergen and Todd Kelly were close behind. Greg Murphy.

Steven Richards car failed to restart after a pitstops. Van Gisbergen was a mover in the middle part of the race, picking off Slade and Courtney, while a set-up change allowed Lowndes to start moving up the order after a slow start to the race. Last to pit was Russell Ingall, who led in his final laps prior to his pitstop. Van Gisbergen took Tander on lap 26. Six laps later Van Gisbergen claimed third from Jason Richards. Late in the race there was a couple of minor contact incidents. Dean Fiore was tipped wide over the back of the circuit. Russell Ingall clashed with Rick Kelly and Michael Caruso tipped Jonathon Webb into a spin. Lap 37 saw Tander spear off the track at the first turn, dumping himself from fifth to tenth.

Winterbottom hung on to win from Whincup, Van Gisbergen, Jason Richards and James Courtney. Tim Slade had a career best performance to finish sixth ahead of Lowndes, Dumbrell, Todd Kelly and Tander.

== Race 14 ==
Alex Davison won the start from his first pole position with Todd Kelly, Whincup, Rick Kelly, Courtney, Will Davison, Holdsworth, D'Alberto, Winterbottom and Coulthard with Tander spearing off at the first turn and Dumbrell spinning at the exit of turn 1.

Todd Kelly was the first of the leaders to pit on lap 15, with brother Rick following a lap later, switching from soft to hard tyres. Courtney follow the following lap.

Alex Davison pitted on lap 21 for his first stop with Whincup following a lap later. After a 30 lap battle Courtney passed Todd Kelly for position on lap 31. Lap 37 saw Jamie Whincup complete his hunt down of race leader Alex Davison and the Commodore moved into the lead. Russell Ingall received the 'meatball' flag for a minor but persistent fluid leak at the back of his Commodore.

Lap 48 saw a problem with Craig Lowndes pitstop, the car was dropped with only three tyres on the car but the car was raised back on its jacks prior to Lowndes attempting to resume with the front left tyre missing. A lap later Alex Davison pulled into the pits with an electrical or electronic malady that was robbing the car of power after a career best race performance to that point. Davison was hauled into the bay, the team needing the space to pit teammate Shane van Gisbergen, any chance of a good result was gone.

As the race reached its closing laps, race leader Whincup, on fading hard tyres was being caught rapidly by Mark Winterbottom. On Lap 61 Lowndes took Jason Richards for fifth, lap 64 saw Van Gisbergen relieve Courtney of third.

Whincup hung on to win from a fast closing Winterbottom. Van Gisbergen took third from Courtney with five laps to go. Lowndes took fifth from Jason Richards with eight laps to go. Tim Slade worked his way past the Kelly brothers and Richards in the closing laps to finish sixth in a career best performance. Behind Richards Todd Kelly led home brother Rick with Steven Richards clawing past Will Davison for a long-awaited top ten finish. Down in 18th Murphy crossed the line with a damaged car but did not lose enough time for Garth Tander to pick up a spot after a poor Sunday race.

== Results ==
Results as follows:

=== Qualifying Race 13 ===
Qualifying timesheets:

Pos	No	Name	Car	Team	Shootout	Qualifying
Pole	5	Mark Winterbottom	Ford FG Falcon	Ford Performance Racing	1:09.6854	1:10.0167
2	1	Jamie Whincup	Holden VE Commodore	Triple Eight Race Engineering	1:09.8333	1:09.9460
3	47	Tim Slade	Ford FG Falcon	James Rosenberg Racing	1:09.8836	1:10.1060
4	2	Garth Tander	Holden VE Commodore	Holden Racing Team	1:09.9374	1:10.1108
5	7	Todd Kelly	Holden VE Commodore	Kelly Racing	1:10.0184	1:10.0381
6	18	James Courtney	Ford FG Falcon	Dick Johnson Racing	1:10.2081	1:09.9648
7	9	Shane van Gisbergen	Ford FG Falcon	Stone Brothers Racing	1:10.3361	1:10.1287
8	55	Paul Dumbrell	Ford FG Falcon	Rod Nash Racing	1:10.3565	1:10.1700
9	888	Craig Lowndes	Holden VE Commodore	Triple Eight Race Engineering	1:10.4351	1:10.0095
10	8	Jason Richards	Holden VE Commodore	Brad Jones Racing	1:10.5488	1:09.9079
11	33	Lee Holdsworth	Holden VE Commodore	Garry Rogers Motorsport		1:10.2032
12	22	Will Davison	Holden VE Commodore	Holden Racing Team		1:10.2372
13	51	Greg Murphy	Holden VE Commodore	Paul Morris Motorsport		1:10.2550
14	12	Dean Fiore	Ford FG Falcon	Triple F Racing		1:10.2899
15	17	Steven Johnson	Ford FG Falcon	Dick Johnson Racing		1:10.2992
16	3	Tony D'Alberto	Holden VE Commodore	Tony D'Alberto Racing		1:10.3499
17	34	Michael Caruso	Holden VE Commodore	Garry Rogers Motorsport		1:10.3738
18	14	Jason Bright	Holden VE Commodore	Brad Jones Racing		1:10.3958
19	10	Andrew Thompson	Holden VE Commodore	Walkinshaw Racing		1:10.4230
20	39	Russell Ingall	Holden VE Commodore	Paul Morris Motorsport		1:10.4347
21	15	Rick Kelly	Holden VE Commodore	Kelly Racing		1:10.4616
22	24	Fabian Coulthard	Holden VE Commodore	Walkinshaw Racing		1:10.4677
23	19	Jonathon Webb	Ford FG Falcon	Tekno Autosports		1:10.4678
24	11	Jason Bargwanna	Holden VE Commodore	Kelly Racing		1:10.5073
25	4	Alex Davison	Ford FG Falcon	Stone Brothers Racing		1:10.5780
26	6	Steven Richards	Ford FG Falcon	Ford Performance Racing		1:10.5903
27	21	Karl Reindler	Holden VE Commodore	Britek Motorsport		1:10.6732
28	16	Tony Ricciardello	Holden VE Commodore	Kelly Racing		1:10.9525
29	30	Daniel Gaunt	Holden VE Commodore	Lucas Dumbrell Motorsport		1:11.2240

=== Race 13 ===
Race timesheets:

Pos	No	Name	Team	Laps	Time/Retired	Grid	Points
1	5	Mark Winterbottom	Ford Performance Racing	42	51:17.8454	1	150
2	1	Jamie Whincup	Triple Eight Race Engineering	42	+0.8s	2	138
3	9	Shane van Gisbergen	Stone Brothers Racing	42	+21.7s	7	129
4	8	Jason Richards	Brad Jones Racing	42	+27.3s	10	120
5	18	James Courtney	Dick Johnson Racing	42	+30.2s	6	111
6	47	Tim Slade	James Rosenberg Racing	42	+30.7s	3	102
7	888	Craig Lowndes	Triple Eight Race Engineering	42	+31.9s	9	96
8	55	Paul Dumbrell	Rod Nash Racing	42	+32.7s	8	90
9	7	Todd Kelly	Kelly Racing	42	+35.0s	5	84
10	2	Garth Tander	Holden Racing Team	42	+35.8s	4	78
11	39	Russell Ingall	Paul Morris Motorsport	42	+35.9s	20	72
12	14	Jason Bright	Brad Jones Racing	42	+36.8s	18	69
13	3	Tony D'Alberto	Tony D'Alberto Racing	42	+40.5s	16	66
14	15	Rick Kelly	Kelly Racing	42	+45.7s	21	63
15	4	Alex Davison	Stone Brothers Racing	42	+46.1s	25	60
16	51	Greg Murphy	Paul Morris Motorsport	42	+46.5s	13	57
17	34	Michael Caruso	Garry Rogers Motorsport	42	+52.1s	17	54
18	17	Steven Johnson	Dick Johnson Racing	42	+56.2s	15	51
19	11	Jason Bargwanna	Kelly Racing	42	+56.8s	24	48
20	12	Dean Fiore	Triple F Racing	42	+1:00.2s	14	45
21	10	Andrew Thompson	Walkinshaw Racing	42	+1:02.7s	19	42
22	33	Lee Holdsworth	Garry Rogers Motorsport	42	+1:05.3s	11	39
23	24	Fabian Coulthard	Walkinshaw Racing	42	+1:06.2s	22	36
24	19	Jonathon Webb	Tekno Autosports	42	+1:06.4s	23	33
25	16	Tony Ricciardello	Kelly Racing	41	+1 lap	28	30
26	30	Daniel Gaunt	Lucas Dumbrell Motorsport	41	+1 lap	29	27
Ret	21	Karl Reindler	Britek Motorsport	29		27	
Ret	6	Steven Richards	Ford Performance Racing	27	Electrical	26	
Ret	22	Will Davison	Holden Racing Team	1	Gearbox	12	

=== Qualifying Race 14 ===
Qualifying timesheets:

Pos	No	Name	Car	Team	Qualifying
Pole	4	Alex Davison	Ford FG Falcon	Stone Brothers Racing	1:10.0614
2	1	Jamie Whincup	Holden VE Commodore	Triple Eight Race Engineering	1:10.0616
3	5	Mark Winterbottom	Ford FG Falcon	Ford Performance Racing	1:10.0715
4	7	Todd Kelly	Holden VE Commodore	Kelly Racing	1:10.1625
5	18	James Courtney	Ford FG Falcon	Dick Johnson Racing	1:10.2811
6	15	Rick Kelly	Holden VE Commodore	Kelly Racing	1:10.3177
7	888	Craig Lowndes	Holden VE Commodore	Triple Eight Race Engineering	1:10.3898
8	33	Lee Holdsworth	Holden VE Commodore	Garry Rogers Motorsport	1:10.4539
9	17	Steven Johnson	Ford FG Falcon	Dick Johnson Racing	1:10.4778
10	9	Shane van Gisbergen	Ford FG Falcon	Stone Brothers Racing	1:10.4898
11	22	Will Davison	Holden VE Commodore	Holden Racing Team	1:10.5069
12	2	Garth Tander	Holden VE Commodore	Holden Racing Team	1:10.5106
13	14	Jason Bright	Holden VE Commodore	Brad Jones Racing	1:10.5665
14	47	Tim Slade	Ford FG Falcon	James Rosenberg Racing	1:10.5784
15	19	Jonathon Webb	Ford FG Falcon	Tekno Autosports	1:10.5957
16	3	Tony D'Alberto	Holden VE Commodore	Tony D'Alberto Racing	1:10.6069
17	24	Fabian Coulthard	Holden VE Commodore	Walkinshaw Racing	1:10.6329
18	55	Paul Dumbrell	Ford FG Falcon	Rod Nash Racing	1:10.6346
19	12	Dean Fiore	Ford FG Falcon	Triple F Racing	1:10.6393
20	51	Greg Murphy	Holden VE Commodore	Paul Morris Motorsport	1:10.6501
21	8	Jason Richards	Holden VE Commodore	Brad Jones Racing	1:10.6527
22	6	Steven Richards	Ford FG Falcon	Ford Performance Racing	1:10.6908
23	39	Russell Ingall	Holden VE Commodore	Paul Morris Motorsport	1:10.6950
24	11	Jason Bargwanna	Holden VE Commodore	Kelly Racing	1:10.7901
25	34	Michael Caruso	Holden VE Commodore	Garry Rogers Motorsport	1:10.8265
26	10	Andrew Thompson	Holden VE Commodore	Walkinshaw Racing	1:10.8398
27	21	Karl Reindler	Holden VE Commodore	Britek Motorsport	1:11.4110
28	16	Tony Ricciardello	Holden VE Commodore	Kelly Racing	1:11.5766
29	30	Daniel Gaunt	Holden VE Commodore	Lucas Dumbrell Motorsport	No time

=== Race 14 ===
Race timesheets:

Pos	No	Name	Team	Laps	Time/Retired	Points
1	1	Jamie Whincup	Triple Eight Race Engineering	69	1:24:35.011	150
2	5	Mark Winterbottom	Ford Performance Racing	69	+4.001s	138
3	9	Shane van Gisbergen	Stone Brothers Racing	69	+6.858s	129
4	18	James Courtney	Dick Johnson Racing	69	+16.893s	120
5	888	Craig Lowndes	Triple Eight Race Engineering	69	+22.875s	111
6	47	Time Slade	James Rosenberg Racing	69	+25.561s	102
7	8	Jason Richards	Brad Jones Racing	69	+28.203s	96
8	7	Todd Kelly	Kelly Racing	69	+34.101s	90
9	15	Rick Kelly	Kelly Racing	69	+34.888s	84
10	6	Steven Richards	Ford Performance Racing	69	+35.904s	78
11	22	Will Davison	Holden Racing Team	69	+38.900s	72
12	33	Lee Holdsworth	Garry Rogers Motorsport	69	+40.400s	69
13	19	Jonathon Webb	Tekno Autosports	69	+40.971s	66
14	24	Fabian Coulthard	Walkinshaw Racing	69	+43.316s	63
15	34	Michael Caruso	Garry Rogers Motorsport	69	+44.200s	60
16	17	Steven Johnson	Dick Johnson Racing	69	+49.184s	57
17	3	Anthony D'Alberto	Tony D'Alberto Racing	69	+53.329s	54
18	51	Greg Murphy	Paul Morris Motorsport	69	+53.792s	51
19	2	Garth Tander	Holden Racing Team	69	+55.914s	48
20	14	Jason Bright	Brad Jones Racing	69	+59.894s	45
21	11	Jason Bargwanna	Kelly Racing	69	+1:00.398s	42
22	12	Dean Fiore	Triple F Racing	69	+1:10.555	39
23	55	Paul Dumbrell	Rod Nash Racing	68	+1 lap	36
24	10	Andrew Thompson	Walkinshaw Racing	68	+1 lap	33
25	39	Russell Ingall	Paul Morris Motorsport	68	+1 lap	30
26	21	Karl Reindler	Britek Motorsport	68	+1 lap	27
27	16	Tony Ricciardello	Kelly Racing	68	+1 lap	24
28	30	Daniel Gaunt	Lucas Dumbrell Motorsport	67	+2 laps	21
DNF	4	Alex Davison	Stone Brothers Racing	47	Electrical	0

== Standings ==
After race 14 of 26 race series the driver's with the top 5 points were:

Pos	Name	Team	Points
1	James Courtney	Dick Johnson Racing	1698
2	Jamie Whincup	Triple Eight Race Engineering	1641
3	Craig Lowndes	Triple Eight Race Engineering	1452
4	Shane van Gisbergen	Stone Brothers Racing	1412
5	Mark Winterbottom	Ford Performance Racing	1344
