= 2010 Sydney 500 =

2010 V8 supercar race

(New South Wales) 2010 Sydney 500
Event Information
- Round 14 of 14 in the 2010 V8 Supercar Championship Series
- Date: 3–5 December 2010
- Location: Sydney Olympic Park, New South Wales
- Venue: Sydney Olympic Park Street Circuit
- Weather: Mixed

Results
Race 1
Distance	69 laps	235.980 km
Pole position	(Australia) Lee Holdsworth; Garry Rogers Motorsport	1:29.8733
Winner	(Australia) Jonathon Webb; Tekno Autosports	2:09:06.9995
Race 2
Distance	74 laps	253.080 km
Pole position	(Australia) Lee Holdsworth; Garry Rogers Motorsport	1:28.7999
Winner	(Australia) Lee Holdsworth; Garry Rogers Motorsport	2:03:58.6442

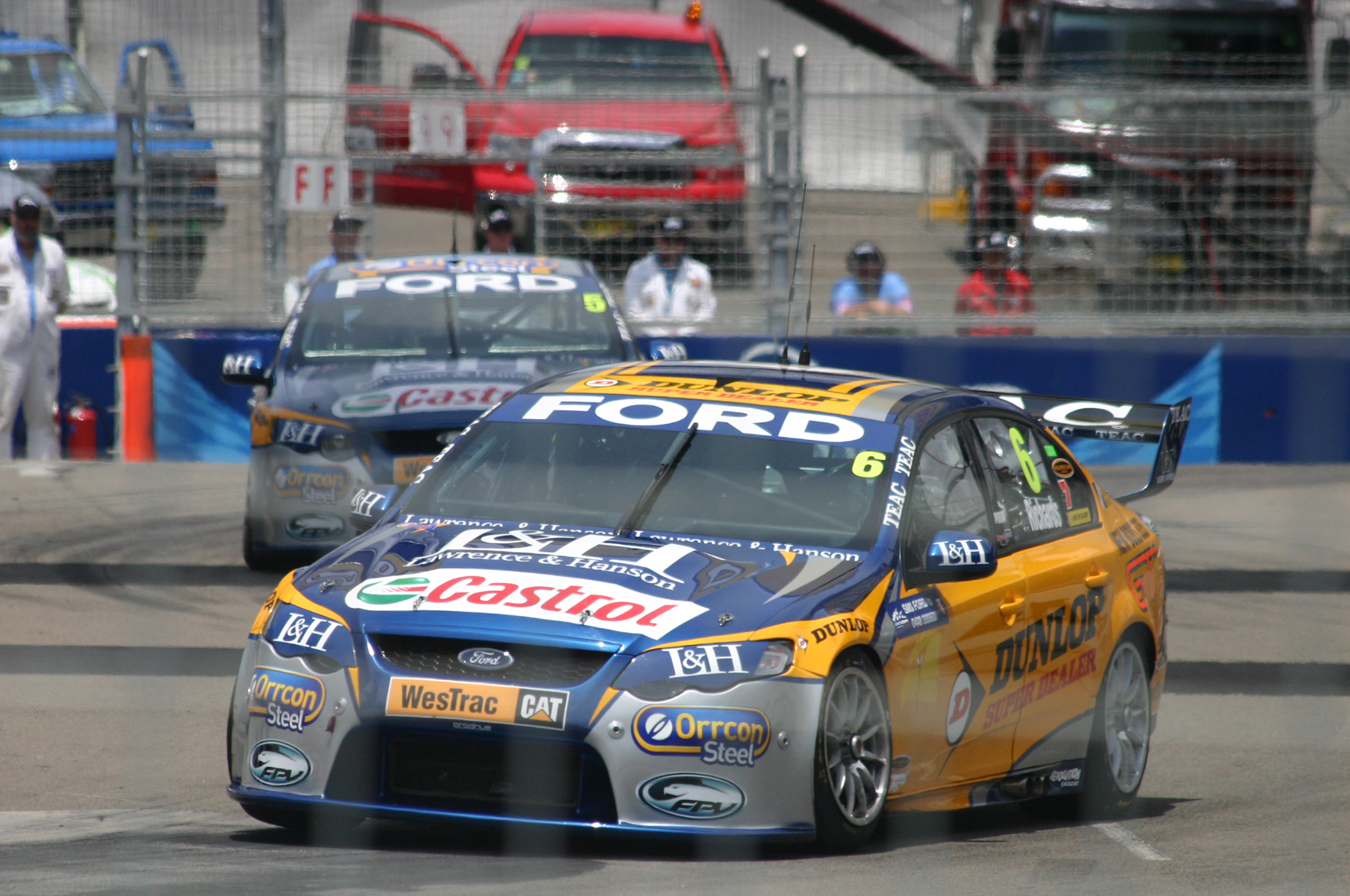
Steven Richards contesting the 2010 Sydney Telstra 500 in a Ford Falcon FG.

The 2010 Sydney 500 (commercially titled 2010 Sydney Telstra 500) was the fourteenth and final event of the 2010 V8 Supercar Championship Series and the second running of the Sydney 500. It was held on the weekend of the December 3 to 5 on the Homebush Street Circuit in Sydney Olympic Park, Sydney, New South Wales.

The Sydney Telstra 500 comprised the 25th and 26th races of the season. The race format followed the same as the Adelaide 500, with a 250 kilometre race each day.

== Report ==
Leading into the weekend, James Courtney of Dick Johnson Racing, reigning champion Jamie Whincup of Triple Eight Race Engineering and Mark Winterbottom of Ford Performance Racing were in contention to win the championship. With the trio running in the top three, a late-race downpour on the Saturday saw all three drivers, amongst many others, hit the wall at Turn 5 (which resulted in the commentary team famously quipping "They're all in the fence!"). Dick Johnson Racing, unlike Triple Eight and Ford Performance Racing, crucially managed to get Courtney on track in time to score points. This gave Courtney the advantage heading into the Sunday race, in which his 14th-place finish was sufficient to secure his maiden championship.

Meanwhile, the Saturday race was won by Tekno Autosports' Jonathon Webb, who had only started 21st after a qualifying crash. Webb survived the chaos during the late-race rain to take his first race victory narrowly ahead of Jason Bright. Lee Holdsworth, who started both races on pole, won the Sunday race, after taking the lead from the low-on-fuel Shane van Gisbergen on the final lap. Steven Richards finished second, in his final full-time drive in the championship.

== Results ==
=== Qualifying 1 ===
Pos.	No.	Driver	Team	Car	Times	
Pos.	No.	Driver	Team	Car	Qualifying	Shootout
1	33	(Australia) Lee Holdsworth	Garry Rogers Motorsport	Holden Commodore VE	+0.4817	1:29.8733
2	5	(Australia) Mark Winterbottom	Ford Performance Racing	Ford Falcon FG	+0.5493	+0.0990
3	1	(Australia) Jamie Whincup	Triple Eight Race Engineering	Holden Commodore VE	1:29.0936	+0.1009
4	34	(Australia) Michael Caruso	Garry Rogers Motorsport	Holden Commodore VE	+0.4611	+0.3513
5	47	(Australia) Tim Slade	James Rosenberg Racing	Ford Falcon FG	+0.3597	+0.6142
6	18	(Australia) James Courtney	Dick Johnson Racing	Ford Falcon FG	+0.5700	+0.8273
7	7	(Australia) Todd Kelly	Kelly Racing	Holden Commodore VE	+0.3840	+0.9895
8	4	(Australia) Alex Davison	Stone Brothers Racing	Ford Falcon FG	+0.5901	+1.0649
9	39	(Australia) Russell Ingall	Paul Morris Motorsport	Holden Commodore VE	+0.3303	+1.8818
10	9	(New Zealand) Shane van Gisbergen	Stone Brothers Racing	Ford Falcon FG	+0.2307	+9.9038
11	888	(Australia) Craig Lowndes	Triple Eight Race Engineering	Holden Commodore VE	+0.6684	
12	51	(New Zealand) Greg Murphy	Paul Morris Motorsport	Holden Commodore VE	+0.7956	
13	24	(New Zealand) Fabian Coulthard	Walkinshaw Racing	Holden Commodore VE	+0.7988	
14	15	(Australia) Rick Kelly	Kelly Racing	Holden Commodore VE	+0.8465	
15	6	(New Zealand) Steven Richards	Ford Performance Racing	Ford Falcon FG	+0.8663	
16	17	(Australia) Steven Johnson	Dick Johnson Racing	Ford Falcon FG	+0.8716	
17	22	(Australia) Will Davison	Holden Racing Team	Holden Commodore VE	+0.9605	
18	3	(Australia) Tony D'Alberto	Tony D'Alberto Racing	Holden Commodore VE	+1.1460	
19	21	(Australia) Karl Reindler	Britek Motorsport	Holden Commodore VE	+1.1582	
20	11	(Australia) Jason Bargwanna	Kelly Racing	Holden Commodore VE	+1.3334	
21	19	(Australia) Jonathon Webb	Tekno Autosports	Ford Falcon FG	+1.3903	
22	2	(Australia) Garth Tander	Holden Racing Team	Holden Commodore VE	+1.4065	
23	30	(Australia) Warren Luff	Lucas Dumbrell Motorsport	Holden Commodore VE	+1.4320	
24	10	(Australia) Andrew Thompson	Walkinshaw Racing	Holden Commodore VE	+1.7704	
25	8	(Australia) Andrew Jones	Brad Jones Racing	Holden Commodore VE	+1.9899	
26	12	(Australia) Dean Fiore	Triple F Racing	Ford Falcon FG	+2.0486	
27	16	(Australia) Tony Ricciardello	Kelly Racing	Holden Commodore VE	+2.9606	
28	14	(Australia) Jason Bright	Brad Jones Racing	Holden Commodore VE	+3.9239	
29	55	(Australia) Paul Dumbrell	Rod Nash Racing	Ford Falcon FG	+13.3859	

=== Race 1 ===
Pos.	No.	Driver	Team	Car	Laps	Time/Retired	Grid	Pts.
1	19	(Australia) Jonathon Webb	Tekno Autosports	Ford Falcon FG	69	2:09:06.9995	21	150
2	14	(Australia) Jason Bright	Brad Jones Racing	Holden Commodore VE	69	+0.6375	28	138
3	15	(Australia) Rick Kelly	Kelly Racing	Holden Commodore VE	69	+6.6071	14	129
4	17	(Australia) Steven Johnson	Dick Johnson Racing	Ford Falcon FG	69	+9.9613	16	120
5	24	(New Zealand) Fabian Coulthard	Walkinshaw Racing	Holden Commodore VE	69	+12.1441	13	111
6	34	(Australia) Michael Caruso	Garry Rogers Motorsport	Holden Commodore VE	69	+19.0878	4	102
7	33	(Australia) Lee Holdsworth	Garry Rogers Motorsport	Holden Commodore VE	69	+26.7878	1	96
8	10	(Australia) Andrew Thompson	Walkinshaw Racing	Holden Commodore VE	69	+1:02.4793	24	90
9	11	(Australia) Jason Bargwanna	Kelly Racing	Holden Commodore VE	68	+1 lap	20	84
10	55	(Australia) Paul Dumbrell	Rod Nash Racing	Ford Falcon FG	68	+1 lap	29	78
11	6	(New Zealand) Steven Richards	Ford Performance Racing	Ford Falcon FG	67	+2 laps	15	72
12	39	(Australia) Russell Ingall	Paul Morris Motorsport	Holden Commodore VE	67	+2 laps	9	69
13	3	(Australia) Tony D'Alberto	Tony D'Alberto Racing	Holden Commodore VE	67	+2 laps	18	66
14	12	(Australia) Dean Fiore	Triple F Racing	Ford Falcon FG	65	+4 laps	26	63
15	18	(Australia) James Courtney	Dick Johnson Racing	Ford Falcon FG	62	+7 laps	6	60
NC	1	(Australia) Jamie Whincup	Triple Eight Race Engineering	Holden Commodore VE	61	+8 laps (Note: In Race 1, Jamie Whincup crossed the finish line at the chequered flag – however, he had done so on an out lap as opposed to a flying lap and as such was not classified as a finisher.)	3	
DNF	9	(New Zealand) Shane van Gisbergen	Stone Brothers Racing	Ford Falcon FG	60	Crash damage	10	
DNF	888	(Australia) Craig Lowndes	Triple Eight Race Engineering	Holden Commodore VE	60	Crash damage	11	
DNF	5	(Australia) Mark Winterbottom	Ford Performance Racing	Ford Falcon FG	60	Crash damage	2	
DNF	7	(Australia) Todd Kelly	Kelly Racing	Holden Commodore VE	59	Crash	7	
DNF	22	(Australia) Will Davison	Holden Racing Team	Holden Commodore VE	59	Crash	17	
DNF	2	(Australia) Garth Tander	Holden Racing Team	Holden Commodore VE	59	Crash	22	
DNF	4	(Australia) Alex Davison	Stone Brothers Racing	Ford Falcon FG	59	Crash	8	
DNF	8	(Australia) Andrew Jones	Brad Jones Racing	Holden Commodore VE	59	Crash	25	
DNF	51	(New Zealand) Greg Murphy	Paul Morris Motorsport	Holden Commodore VE	57	Crash	12	
DNF	47	(Australia) Tim Slade	James Rosenberg Racing	Ford Falcon FG	53	Crash	5	
DNF	16	(Australia) Tony Ricciardello	Kelly Racing	Holden Commodore VE	33		27	
DNF	30	(Australia) Warren Luff	Lucas Dumbrell Motorsport	Holden Commodore VE	15	Crash	23	
DNF	21	(Australia) Karl Reindler	Britek Motorsport	Holden Commodore VE	5	Crash	19	
Fastest Lap: Mark Winterbottom (Ford Performance Racing), 1:29.4966

=== Qualifying 2 ===
Pos.	No.	Driver	Team	Car	Time
1	33	(Australia) Lee Holdsworth	Garry Rogers Motorsport	Holden Commodore VE	1:28.7999
2	1	(Australia) Jamie Whincup	Triple Eight Race Engineering	Holden Commodore VE	+0.0742
3	5	(Australia) Mark Winterbottom	Ford Performance Racing	Ford Falcon FG	+0.1572
4	14	(Australia) Jason Bright	Brad Jones Racing	Holden Commodore VE	+0.1635
5	22	(Australia) Will Davison	Holden Racing Team	Holden Commodore VE	+0.2896
6	34	(Australia) Michael Caruso	Garry Rogers Motorsport	Holden Commodore VE	+0.3015
7	7	(Australia) Todd Kelly	Kelly Racing	Holden Commodore VE	+0.3866
8	2	(Australia) Garth Tander	Holden Racing Team	Holden Commodore VE	+0.4147
9	888	(Australia) Craig Lowndes	Triple Eight Race Engineering	Holden Commodore VE	+0.4809
10	47	(Australia) Tim Slade	James Rosenberg Racing	Ford Falcon FG	+0.4922
11	11	(Australia) Jason Bargwanna	Kelly Racing	Holden Commodore VE	+0.6563
12	18	(Australia) James Courtney	Dick Johnson Racing	Ford Falcon FG	+0.6835
13	15	(Australia) Rick Kelly	Kelly Racing	Holden Commodore VE	+0.6836
14	9	(New Zealand) Shane van Gisbergen	Stone Brothers Racing	Ford Falcon FG	+0.7054
15	4	(Australia) Alex Davison	Stone Brothers Racing	Ford Falcon FG	+0.7061
16	6	(New Zealand) Steven Richards	Ford Performance Racing	Ford Falcon FG	+0.7513
17	17	(Australia) Steven Johnson	Dick Johnson Racing	Ford Falcon FG	+0.7658
18	19	(Australia) Jonathon Webb	Tekno Autosports	Ford Falcon FG	+0.8785
19	51	(New Zealand) Greg Murphy	Paul Morris Motorsport	Holden Commodore VE	+0.9919
20	39	(Australia) Russell Ingall	Paul Morris Motorsport	Holden Commodore VE	+1.0042
21	21	(Australia) Karl Reindler	Britek Motorsport	Holden Commodore VE	+1.0818
22	10	(Australia) Andrew Thompson	Walkinshaw Racing	Holden Commodore VE	+1.1772
23	24	(New Zealand) Fabian Coulthard	Walkinshaw Racing	Holden Commodore VE	+1.1927
24	3	(Australia) Tony D'Alberto	Tony D'Alberto Racing	Holden Commodore VE	+1.3603
25	55	(Australia) Paul Dumbrell	Rod Nash Racing	Ford Falcon FG	+1.5792
26	30	(Australia) Warren Luff	Lucas Dumbrell Motorsport	Holden Commodore VE	+1.7410
27	12	(Australia) Dean Fiore	Triple F Racing	Ford Falcon FG	+1.7803
28	8	(Australia) Andrew Jones	Brad Jones Racing	Holden Commodore VE	+2.5674
29	16	(Australia) Tony Ricciardello	Kelly Racing	Holden Commodore VE	+2.9884

=== Race 2 ===
Pos.	No.	Driver	Team	Car	Laps	Time/Retired	Grid	Pts.
1	33	(Australia) Lee Holdsworth	Garry Rogers Motorsport	Holden Commodore VE	74	2:03:58.6442	1	150
2	6	(New Zealand) Steven Richards	Ford Performance Racing	Ford Falcon FG	74	+1.5358	16	138
3	9	(New Zealand) Shane van Gisbergen	Stone Brothers Racing	Ford Falcon FG	74	+8.4239	14	129
4	17	(Australia) Steven Johnson	Dick Johnson Racing	Ford Falcon FG	74	+8.4437	17	120
5	1	(Australia) Jamie Whincup	Triple Eight Race Engineering	Holden Commodore VE	74	+10.2476	2	111
6	888	(Australia) Craig Lowndes	Triple Eight Race Engineering	Holden Commodore VE	74	+13.4918	9	102
7	15	(Australia) Rick Kelly	Kelly Racing	Holden Commodore VE	74	+16.0408	13	96
8	34	(Australia) Michael Caruso	Garry Rogers Motorsport	Holden Commodore VE	74	+16.2850	6	90
9	2	(Australia) Garth Tander	Holden Racing Team	Holden Commodore VE	74	+19.8472	8	84
10	19	(Australia) Jonathon Webb	Tekno Autosports	Ford Falcon FG	74	+22.8910	18	78
11	3	(Australia) Tony D'Alberto	Tony D'Alberto Racing	Holden Commodore VE	74	+23.8604	24	72
12	51	(New Zealand) Greg Murphy	Paul Morris Motorsport	Holden Commodore VE	74	+24.8702	19	69
13	8	(Australia) Andrew Jones	Brad Jones Racing	Holden Commodore VE	74	+27.5751	28	66
14	18	(Australia) James Courtney	Dick Johnson Racing	Ford Falcon FG	74	+29.7892	12	63
15	55	(Australia) Paul Dumbrell	Rod Nash Racing	Ford Falcon FG	74	+30.6741	25	60
16	12	(Australia) Dean Fiore	Triple F Racing	Ford Falcon FG	74	+34.5637	27	57
17	16	(Australia) Tony Ricciardello	Kelly Racing	Holden Commodore VE	74	+40.8822	29	54
18	30	(Australia) Warren Luff	Lucas Dumbrell Motorsport	Holden Commodore VE	74	+45.8667	26	51
19	24	(New Zealand) Fabian Coulthard	Walkinshaw Racing	Holden Commodore VE	74	+56.0602	23	48
20	39	(Australia) Russell Ingall	Paul Morris Motorsport	Holden Commodore VE	74	+1:20.1665	20	45
21	7	(Australia) Todd Kelly	Kelly Racing	Holden Commodore VE	72	+2 laps	7	42
22	11	(Australia) Jason Bargwanna	Kelly Racing	Holden Commodore VE	70	+4 laps	11	39
23	4	(Australia) Alex Davison	Stone Brothers Racing	Ford Falcon FG	59	+15 laps	15	36
DNF	5	(Australia) Mark Winterbottom	Ford Performance Racing	Ford Falcon FG	65	Tailshaft	3	
DNF	47	(Australia) Tim Slade	James Rosenberg Racing	Ford Falcon FG	58	Crash	10	
DNF	14	(Australia) Jason Bright	Brad Jones Racing	Holden Commodore VE	54	Engine	4	
DNF	22	(Australia) Will Davison	Holden Racing Team	Holden Commodore VE	47	Engine	5	
DNF	21	(Australia) Karl Reindler	Britek Motorsport	Holden Commodore VE	44	Radiator	21	
DNF	10	(Australia) Andrew Thompson	Walkinshaw Racing	Holden Commodore VE	37	Mechanical	22	
Fastest Lap: Craig Lowndes (Triple Eight Race Engineering), 1:29.3901
