= 2010 Yas V8 400 =

2010 V8 supercar race

(United Arab Emirates) 2010 Yas V8 400
Event Information
- Round 1 of 14 in the 2010 V8 Supercar Championship Series
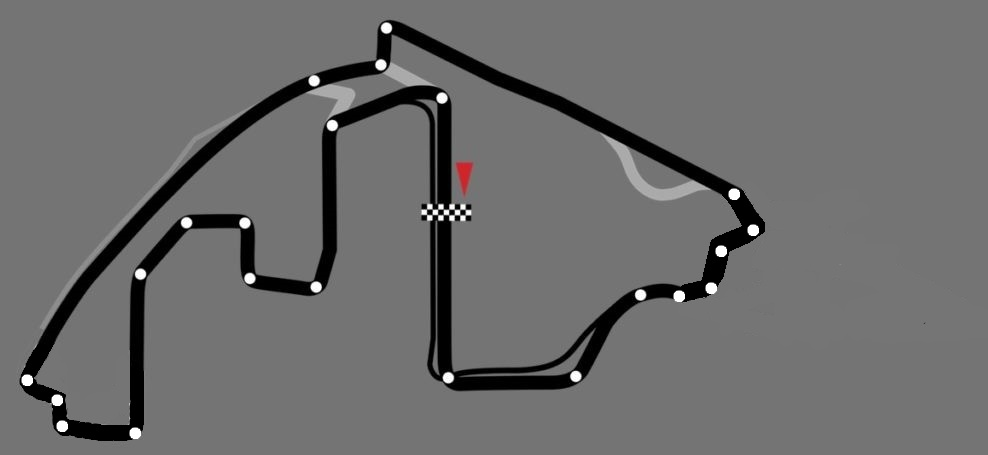
- Date: 18–20 February 2010
- Location: Yas Island, United Arab Emirates
- Venue: Yas Marina Circuit
- Weather: Fine

Results
Race 1
Distance	43 laps	200 km
Pole position	Jamie Whincup; Triple Eight Race Engineering	1:58.114
Winner	Jamie Whincup; Triple Eight Race Engineering	1:28:04.434
Race 2
Distance	43 laps	200 km
Pole position	Mark Winterbottom; Ford Performance Racing	1:58.037
Winner	Jamie Whincup; Triple Eight Race Engineering	1:27:28.373

The 2010 Yas V8 400 was a motor race for the Australian sedan-based V8 Supercars. It was the first race of the 2010 V8 Supercar Championship Series. It was held on the weekend of February 18–20 on Yas Marina Circuit, in Abu Dhabi, United Arab Emirates. It was the first time V8 Supercar visited the circuit and only the fourth time V8 Supercar had visited the Middle-East, having three times previously raced at the Bahrain International Circuit. The two Asian venues were linked together for the 2010 season, causing the cancellation of the 2009 Desert 400 at Bahrain, and the 2010 Desert 400 will take place the week following the Yas V8 400.

The weekend was dominated by Triple Eight Race Engineering and by reigning champion Jamie Whincup who won both races over the course of the weekend. Team mate Craig Lowndes had a second and fifth, proving that the off-season change from Ford to Holden has been no impediment to their success. Between them on points is leading Ford driver Mark Winterbottom taking a third and a second for the weekend. The other driver to claim a top three finish was Stone Brothers Racing Ford driver Shane van Gisbergen who finished third under pressure in Race 2.

== Results ==
Results as follows:

=== Race 1 ===
==== Qualifying ====
Pos	No	Name	Team	Car	Time
1	1	(Australia) Jamie Whincup	Triple Eight Race Engineering	Holden VE Commodore	1:58.204
2	9	(New Zealand) Shane van Gisbergen	Stone Brothers Racing	Ford FG Falcon	1:58.405
3	888	(Australia) Craig Lowndes	Triple Eight Race Engineering	Holden VE Commodore	1:58.499
4	5	(Australia) Mark Winterbottom	Ford Performance Racing	Ford FG Falcon	1:58.521
5	22	(Australia) Will Davison	Holden Racing Team	Holden VE Commodore	1:58.709
6	18	(Australia) James Courtney	Dick Johnson Racing	Ford FG Falcon	1:58.897
7	4	(Australia) Alex Davison	Stone Brothers Racing	Ford FG Falcon	1:58.979
8	33	(Australia) Lee Holdsworth	Garry Rogers Motorsport	Holden VE Commodore	1:59.050
9	14	(Australia) Jason Bright	Brad Jones Racing	Holden VE Commodore	1:59.113
10	55	(Australia) Paul Dumbrell	Rod Nash Racing	Ford FG Falcon	1:59.136
11	34	(Australia) Michael Caruso	Garry Rogers Motorsport	Holden VE Commodore	1:59.198
12	39	(Australia) Russell Ingall	Paul Morris Motorsport	Holden VE Commodore	1:59.240
13	17	(Australia) Steven Johnson	Dick Johnson Racing	Ford FG Falcon	1:59.321
14	11	(Australia) Jason Bargwanna	Kelly Racing	Holden VE Commodore	1:59.371
15	19	(Australia) Jonathon Webb	Tekno Autosports	Ford FG Falcon	1:59.376
16	15	(Australia) Rick Kelly	Kelly Racing	Holden VE Commodore	1:59.427
17	3	(Australia) Tony D'Alberto	Tony D'Alberto Racing	Holden VE Commodore	1:59.897
18	47	(Australia) Tim Slade	James Rosenberg Racing	Ford FG Falcon	1:59.903
19	8	(New Zealand) Jason Richards	Brad Jones Racing	Holden VE Commodore	1:59.912
20	7	(Australia) Todd Kelly	Kelly Racing	Holden VE Commodore	2:00.073
21	10	(Australia) Andrew Thompson	Walkinshaw Racing	Holden VE Commodore	2:00.077
22	6	(New Zealand) Steven Richards	Ford Performance Racing	Ford FG Falcon	2:00.177
23	24	(New Zealand) Fabian Coulthard	Walkinshaw Racing	Holden VE Commodore	2:00.183
24	21	(Australia) Karl Reindler	Britek Motorsport	Holden VE Commodore	2:00.379
25	12	(Australia) Dean Fiore	Triple F Racing	Ford FG Falcon	2:00.390
26	51	(Australia) Paul Morris	Paul Morris Motorsport	Holden VE Commodore	2:00.845
27	30	(New Zealand) Daniel Gaunt	Lucas Dumbrell Motorsport	Holden VE Commodore	2:00.885
28	16	(Australia) Tony Ricciardello	Kelly Racing	Holden VE Commodore	2:03.013
EXC	2	(Australia) Garth Tander	Holden Racing Team	Holden VE Commodore	1:58.322

==== Top Ten Shootout ====
Pos	No	Name	Team	Car	Time
1	1	(Australia) Jamie Whincup	Triple Eight Race Engineering	Holden VE Commodore	1:58.114
2	5	(Australia) Mark Winterbottom	Ford Performance Racing	Ford FG Falcon	1:58.662
3	18	(Australia) James Courtney	Dick Johnson Racing	Ford FG Falcon	1:58.679
4	22	(Australia) Will Davison	Holden Racing Team	Holden VE Commodore	1:58.854
5	14	(Australia) Jason Bright	Brad Jones Racing	Holden VE Commodore	1:58.900
6	33	(Australia) Lee Holdsworth	Garry Rogers Motorsport	Holden VE Commodore	1:59.356
7	4	(Australia) Alex Davison	Stone Brothers Racing	Ford FG Falcon	1:59.418
8	9	(New Zealand) Shane van Gisbergen	Stone Brothers Racing	Ford FG Falcon	1:59.525
9	888	(Australia) Craig Lowndes	Triple Eight Race Engineering	Holden VE Commodore	2:09.287
-	55	(Australia) Paul Dumbrell	Rod Nash Racing	Ford FG Falcon	no time

==== Race ====
After qualifying second, Garth Tander sent to the rear of grid for not having jack stands under the car while crew member were working on the car. Mark Winterbottom won the start of the race ahead of Jamie Whincup, Will Davison, Lee Holdsworth, James Courtney and Alex Davison.

Paul Morris hit and spun Todd Kelly off the track, with Garth Tander getting tangled up as a result.

James Courtney, suffering from clutch problems, tapped the rear of Lee Holdsworth, shoving slightly aside at the chicane. Courtney later moved aside and let Holdsowrth back in front.

Four laps in, race leader Winterbottom was assigned a ten-second penalty for starting outside of his grid box. Whincup took the lead from Winterbottom at turn 1 on lap 8. It was a lead Winterbottom would never regain with Craig Lowndes climbing into second after Winterbottom served his ten-second penalty at his first pitstop.

James Courtney finished in fourth position ahead of Lee Holdsworth and Shane van Gisbergen. Paul Dumbrell drove an excellent race for his new team to finish seventh ahead of V8 Supercar rookie Jonathon Webb after an excellent drive. Alex Davison and Rick Kelly rounded out the top ten.

Holden Racing Team had a poor day with 2009 series runner up Will Davison stopping with engine failure while Garth Tander was disqualified from qualifying for a pitlane infringement. The rear of grid start saw Tander get tangled with other cars during the race leaving the car damaged and he limped home for 26th position after losing four laps.

Pos	No	Name	Team	Laps	Time/Retired	Grid	Points
1	1	(Australia) Jamie Whincup	Triple Eight Race Engineering	43	1hr 28min 04.434sec	1	150
2	888	(Australia) Craig Lowndes	Triple Eight Race Engineering	43	+0.9s	9	138
3	5	(Australia) Mark Winterbottom	Ford Performance Racing	43	+2.0s	2	129
4	18	(Australia) James Courtney	Dick Johnson Racing	43	+11.9s	3	120
5	33	(Australia) Lee Holdsworth	Garry Rogers Motorsport	43	+13.0s	6	111
6	9	(New Zealand) Shane van Gisbergen	Stone Brothers Racing	43	+22.2s	8	102
7	55	(Australia) Paul Dumbrell	Rod Nash Racing	43	+23.7s	10	96
8	19	(Australia) Jonathon Webb	Tekno Autosports	43	+31.3	15	90
9	4	(Australia) Alex Davison	Stone Brothers Racing	43	+35.3	7	84
10	15	(Australia) Rick Kelly	Kelly Racing	43	+37.6s	16	78
11	17	(Australia) Steven Johnson	Dick Johnson Racing	43	+38.3s	13	72
12	8	(New Zealand) Jason Richards	Brad Jones Racing	43	+41.0s	19	69
13	11	(Australia) Jason Bargwanna	Kelly Racing	43	+42.7s	14	66
14	47	(Australia) Tim Slade	James Rosenberg Racing	43	+43.9s	18	63
15	34	(Australia) Michael Caruso	Garry Rogers Motorsport	43	+45.8s	11	60
16	6	(New Zealand) Steven Richards	Ford Performance Racing	43	+1:00.1s	22	57
17	24	(New Zealand) Fabian Coulthard	Walkinshaw Racing	43	+1:01.3s	23	54
18	3	(Australia) Tony D'Alberto	Tony D'Alberto Racing	43	+1:18.5s	17	51
19	10	(Australia) Andrew Thompson	Walkinshaw Racing	43	+1:22.6s	21	48
20	12	(Australia) Dean Fiore	Triple F Racing	43	+1:36.7s	25	45
21	14	(Australia) Jason Bright	Brad Jones Racing	43	+1:50.2s	9	42
22	30	(New Zealand) Daniel Gaunt	Lucas Dumbrell Motorsport	43	+1:51.7s	27	39
23	51	(Australia) Paul Morris	Paul Morris Motorsport	42	+ 1 lap	26	36
24	16	(Australia) Tony Ricciardello	Kelly Racing	42	+ 1 lap	28	33
25	7	(Australia) Todd Kelly	Kelly Racing	40	+ 3 laps	20	30
26	2	(Australia) Garth Tander	Holden Racing Team	36	+ 7 laps	29	27
27	39	(Australia) Russell Ingall	Paul Morris Motorsport	34	+ 9 laps	12	24
Ret	22	(Australia) Will Davison	Holden Racing Team	28	Engine	4	
Ret	21	(Australia) Karl Reindler	Britek Motorsport	23	Retired	24	
Fastest lap: Shane van Gisbergen (Stone Brothers Racing), 1:59.1140

=== Race 2 ===
==== Qualifying ====
Pos	No	Name	Team	Car	Time
1	5	(Australia) Mark Winterbottom	Ford Performance Racing	Ford FG Falcon	1:58.037
2	1	(Australia) Jamie Whincup	Triple Eight Race Engineering	Holden VE Commodore	1:58.215
3	15	(Australia) Rick Kelly	Kelly Racing	Holden VE Commodore	1:58.378
4	2	(Australia) Garth Tander	Holden Racing Team	Holden VE Commodore	1:58.393
5	18	(Australia) James Courtney	Dick Johnson Racing	Ford FG Falcon	1:58.442
6	888	(Australia) Craig Lowndes	Triple Eight Race Engineering	Holden VE Commodore	1:58.524
7	9	(New Zealand) Shane van Gisbergen	Stone Brothers Racing	Ford FG Falcon	1:58.530
8	8	(New Zealand) Jason Richards	Brad Jones Racing	Holden VE Commodore	1:58.552
9	4	(Australia) Alex Davison	Stone Brothers Racing	Ford FG Falcon	1:58.585
10	34	(Australia) Michael Caruso	Garry Rogers Motorsport	Holden VE Commodore	1:58.588
11	14	(Australia) Jason Bright	Brad Jones Racing	Holden VE Commodore	1:58.595
12	7	(Australia) Todd Kelly	Kelly Racing	Holden VE Commodore	1:58.612
13	17	(Australia) Steven Johnson	Dick Johnson Racing	Ford FG Falcon	1:58.663
14	11	(Australia) Jason Bargwanna	Kelly Racing	Holden VE Commodore	1:58.845
15	33	(Australia) Lee Holdsworth	Garry Rogers Motorsport	Holden VE Commodore	1:58.848
16	19	(Australia) Jonathon Webb	Tekno Autosports	Ford FG Falcon	1:59.043
17	39	(Australia) Russell Ingall	Paul Morris Motorsport	Holden VE Commodore	1:59.176
18	47	(Australia) Tim Slade	James Rosenberg Racing	Ford FG Falcon	1:59.308
19	24	(New Zealand) Fabian Coulthard	Walkinshaw Racing	Holden VE Commodore	1:59.373
20	6	(New Zealand) Steven Richards	Ford Performance Racing	Ford FG Falcon	1:59.527
21	55	(Australia) Paul Dumbrell	Rod Nash Racing	Ford FG Falcon	1:59.569
22	22	(Australia) Will Davison	Holden Racing Team	Holden VE Commodore	1:59.683
23	3	(Australia) Tony D'Alberto	Tony D'Alberto Racing	Holden VE Commodore	1:59.752
24	12	(Australia) Dean Fiore	Triple F Racing	Ford FG Falcon	1:59.927
25	21	(Australia) Karl Reindler	Britek Motorsport	Holden VE Commodore	1:59.962
26	10	(Australia) Andrew Thompson	Walkinshaw Racing	Holden VE Commodore	2:00.078
27	51	(Australia) Paul Morris	Paul Morris Motorsport	Holden VE Commodore	2:00.562
28	30	(New Zealand) Daniel Gaunt	Lucas Dumbrell Motorsport	Holden VE Commodore	2:01.438
29	16	(Australia) Tony Ricciardello	Kelly Racing	Holden VE Commodore	2:02.002

==== Race ====
Paul Morris pulled into the pits before the start of the race. Todd Kelly and Michael Caruso tangled in a chaotic start which also saw Steven Richards spun in front of the field after contact with Tony D'Alberto and contact between Craig Lowndes and Shane van Gisbergen. Alex Davison also completed the lap with a fender bent onto a tyre, forcing a lap one pitstop. The steel cords from the tyre wrapped themselves around the front left suspension causing a long stop.

Jamie Whincup won the start from Garth Tander, Rick Kelly, James Courtney and a slow away polesitter, Mark Winterbottom with a short gap to Lowndes and Van Gisbergen. Van Gisbergen soon fought past Lowndes, the Triple Eight Commodore slowing after the heavy contact on the opening lap and fell into the clutches of Steven Johnson.

Todd Kelly was spun around by Dean Fiore, then later made heavy contact with Daniel Gaunt on lap 18, resulting in a puncture and deranged front right corner of Kelly's Commodore.

Garth Tander pitted on lap 20 after the wheel nut fell off the front left wheel. The hub was damaged returned to the pits and a replacement wheel was not able to be fitted successfully and his car was pushed into the garage to attempt a repair.

Whincup capitalised on a good race start and held the lead for most of the race, winning from Winterbottom who clawed back to second after his poor start. Shane van Gisbergen claimed third after strong race to return Stone Brothers Racing to form after a rebuilding year in 2009. Rick Kelly got the best of Craig Lowndes for fourth position with James Courtney next. Lee Holdsworth took Steven Johnson for seventh on the final lap with Russell Ingall and Jason Bright completing the top ten.

Pos	No	Name	Team	Laps	Time/Retired	Grid	Points
1	1	(Australia) Jamie Whincup	Triple Eight Race Engineering	43	1hr 27min 28.373sec	2	150
2	5	(Australia) Mark Winterbottom	Ford Performance Racing	43	+4.1 s	1	138
3	9	(New Zealand) Shane van Gisbergen	Stone Brothers Racing	43	+11.8 s	7	129
4	15	(Australia) Rick Kelly	Kelly Racing	43	+17.4 s	3	120
5	888	(Australia) Craig Lowndes	Triple Eight Race Engineering	43	+18.3 s	6	111
6	18	(Australia) James Courtney	Dick Johnson Racing	43	+31.6 s	5	102
7	33	(Australia) Lee Holdsworth	Garry Rogers Motorsport	43	+35.5 s	15	96
8	17	(Australia) Steven Johnson	Dick Johnson Racing	43	+35.6 s	13	90
9	39	(Australia) Russell Ingall	Paul Morris Motorsport	43	+39.4 s	17	84
10	14	(Australia) Jason Bright	Brad Jones Racing	43	+42.1 s	11	78
11	34	(Australia) Michael Caruso	Garry Rogers Motorsport	43	+45.3 s	10	72
12	55	(Australia) Paul Dumbrell	Rod Nash Racing	43	+51.5 s	21	69
13	47	(Australia) Tim Slade	James Rosenberg Racing	43	+57.6 s	18	66
14	22	(Australia) Will Davison	Holden Racing Team	43	+1:03.0 s	22	63
15	11	(Australia) Jason Bargwanna	Kelly Racing	43	+1:03.4 s	14	60
16	24	(New Zealand) Fabian Coulthard	Walkinshaw Racing	43	+1:15.9 s	19	57
17	6	(New Zealand) Steven Richards	Ford Performance Racing	43	+1:17.2 s	20	54
18	19	(Australia) Jonathon Webb	Tekno Autosports	43	+1:17.8 s	16	51
19	3	(Australia) Tony D'Alberto	Tony D'Alberto Racing	43	+1:20.1 s	23	48
20	10	(Australia) Andrew Thompson	Walkinshaw Racing	43	+1:26.5 s	26	45
21	8	(New Zealand) Jason Richards	Brad Jones Racing	43	+1:27.9 s	8	42
22	12	(Australia) Dean Fiore	Triple F Racing	43	+1:53.1 s	24	39
23	21	(Australia) Karl Reindler	Britek Motorsport	42	+ 1 lap	25	36
24	30	(New Zealand) Daniel Gaunt	Lucas Dumbrell Motorsport	42	+ 1 lap	28	33
25	16	(Australia) Tony Ricciardello	Kelly Racing	42	+ 1 lap	29	30
26	7	(Australia) Todd Kelly	Kelly Racing	42	+ 1 lap	12	27
27	4	(Australia) Alex Davison	Stone Brothers Racing	41	+ 2 laps	9	24
Ret	2	(Australia) Garth Tander	Holden Racing Team	19	Wheel hub	4	
DNS	51	(Australia) Paul Morris	Paul Morris Motorsport	0	Did Not Start	27	
Fastest lap: Shane van Gisbergen (Stone Brothers Racing), 1:58.7370

== Standings ==
- After Race 2 of 26

Pos	No	Name	Team	Points
1	1	Jamie Whincup	Triple Eight Race Engineering	300
2	5	Mark Winterbottom	Ford Performance Racing	267
3	888	Craig Lowndes	Triple Eight Race Engineering	249
4	9	Shane van Gisbergen	Stone Brothers Racing	231
5	18	James Courtney	Dick Johnson Racing	222
