= 2010 V8 Supercar Championship Series =

Motor racing competition

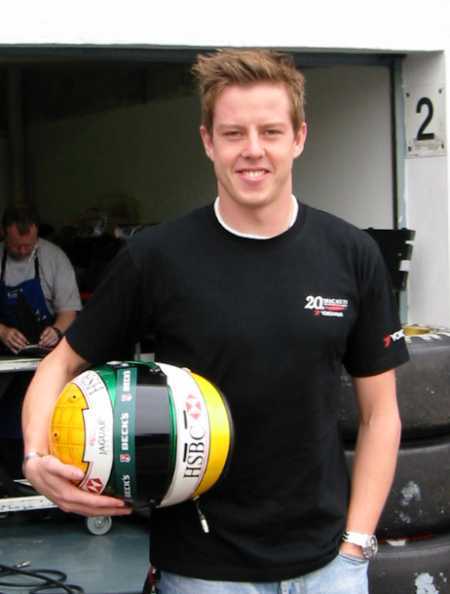
James Courtney became a V8 Supercar Champion for the first time with Dick Johnson Racing.

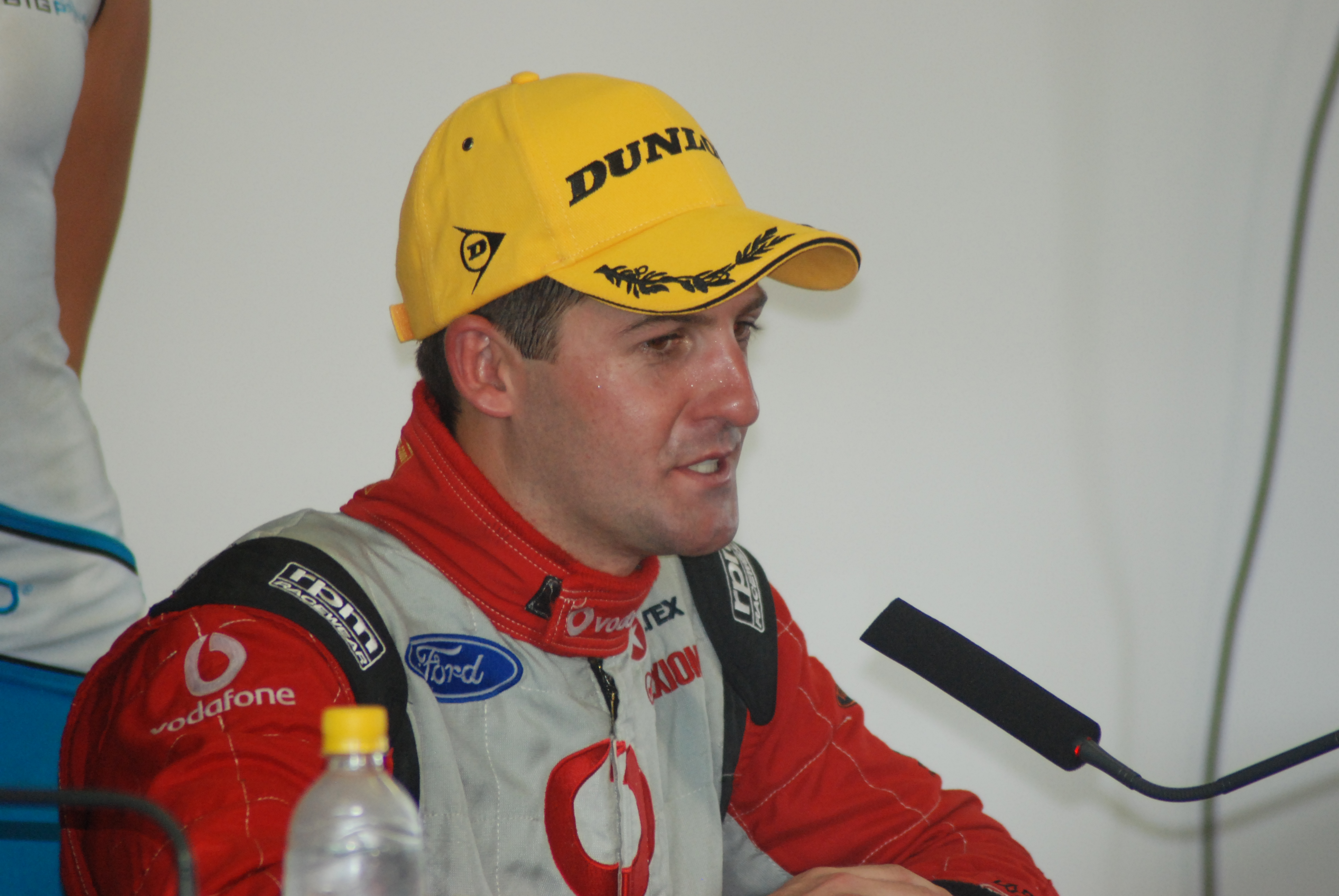
Jamie Whincup finished Runner up for the 2010 Season, ending a two-year championship winning streak.

Mark Winterbottom, finished third in the championship for 2010.

The 2010 V8 Supercar Championship Series was an FIA sanctioned international motor racing series for V8 Supercars. It was the twelfth V8 Supercar Championship Series and the fourteenth series in which V8 Supercars have contested the premier Australian touring car title. The championship began on 19 February in the Middle East at Abu Dhabi's Yas Marina Circuit and concluded on 5 December at the Homebush Street Circuit. These events were held in all states of Australia and in the Northern Territory as well as in the United Arab Emirates, Bahrain and New Zealand. The 51st Australian Touring Car Championship title was awarded to the winner of the Drivers Championship by the Confederation of Australian Motor Sport.

James Courtney won the Drivers Championship for Dick Johnson Racing by 65 points from Jamie Whincup in the final race of the season at the 2010 Sydney Telstra 500. Championship Team of the Year was awarded to Triple Eight Race Engineering and Champion Manufacturer of the Year to Holden.

== Teams and drivers ==
The following teams and drivers competed in the 2010 championship.

Manufacturer	Model	Team	No.	Driver name	Rounds	Phillip Island/Bathurst	Gold Coast
Ford	Falcon FG	Stone Brothers Racing	4	(Australia) Alex Davison	All	(Australia) David Brabham	
Ford	Falcon FG	Stone Brothers Racing	9	(New Zealand) Shane van Gisbergen	All	(New Zealand) John McIntyre	
Ford	Falcon FG	Ford Performance Racing	5	(Australia) Mark Winterbottom	All	(Australia) Luke Youlden	
Ford	Falcon FG	Ford Performance Racing	6	(New Zealand) Steven Richards	All	(Australia) James Moffat	(Australia) Will Power
Ford	Falcon FG	Triple F Racing	12	(Australia) Dean Fiore	All	(Australia) Michael Patrizi	(Italy) Gianni Morbidelli
Ford	Falcon FG	Dick Johnson Racing	17	(Australia) Steven Johnson	All	(Australia) Marcus Marshall	(United Kingdom) Dario Franchitti
Ford	Falcon FG	Dick Johnson Racing	18	(Australia) James Courtney	All	(Australia) Warren Luff	
Ford	Falcon FG	Tekno Autosports (DJR)	19	(Australia) Jonathon Webb	All	(Australia) David Russell	(France) Sébastien Bourdais
Ford	Falcon FG	James Rosenberg Racing (SBR)	47	(Australia) Tim Slade	All	(Australia) Jack Perkins	(Brazil) Hélio Castroneves
Ford	Falcon FG	Rod Nash Racing (FPR)	55	(Australia) Paul Dumbrell	All	(Australia) Dean Canto	(Canada) Jacques Villeneuve
Holden	Commodore VE	Triple Eight Race Engineering	1	(Australia) Jamie Whincup	All	(Australia) Steve Owen	
Holden	Commodore VE	Triple Eight Race Engineering	888	(Australia) Craig Lowndes	All	(Australia) Mark Skaife	(United Kingdom) Andy Priaulx
Holden	Commodore VE	Holden Racing Team	2	(Australia) Garth Tander	All	(Australia) Cameron McConville	
Holden	Commodore VE	Holden Racing Team	22	(Australia) Will Davison	All	(Australia) David Reynolds	(Australia) Ryan Briscoe
Holden	Commodore VE	Tony D'Alberto Racing	3	(Australia) Tony D'Alberto	All	(Australia) Shane Price	(Portugal) Tiago Monteiro
Holden	Commodore VE	Kelly Racing	7	(Australia) Todd Kelly	All	(Australia) Dale Wood	(New Zealand) Scott Dixon
Holden	Commodore VE	Kelly Racing	11	(Australia) Jason Bargwanna	All	(Australia) Glenn Seton	(Canada) Alex Tagliani
Holden	Commodore VE	Kelly Racing	15	(Australia) Rick Kelly	All	(Australia) Owen Kelly	
Holden	Commodore VE	Kelly Racing	16	(Australia) Tony Ricciardello	All	(Australia) Taz Douglas	(Australia) Dale Wood
Holden	Commodore VE	Brad Jones Racing	8	(New Zealand) Jason Richards	1–12	(Australia) Andrew Jones	
Holden	Commodore VE	Brad Jones Racing	8	(Australia) Andrew Jones	13–14	(Australia) Andrew Jones	
Holden	Commodore VE	Brad Jones Racing	14	(Australia) Jason Bright	All	(New Zealand) Matthew Halliday	(Switzerland) Alain Menu
Holden	Commodore VE	Walkinshaw Racing (HRT)	10	(Australia) Andrew Thompson	All	(Australia) Nick Percat (Australia) Ryan Briscoe	(Finland) Mika Salo
Holden	Commodore VE	Walkinshaw Racing (HRT)	24	(New Zealand) Fabian Coulthard	All	(New Zealand) Craig Baird	(Australia) David Reynolds
Holden	Commodore VE	Britek Motorsport (BJR)	21	(Australia) Karl Reindler	All	(Australia) David Wall	(Italy) Fabrizio Giovanardi
Holden	Commodore VE	Lucas Dumbrell Motorsport	30	(New Zealand) Daniel Gaunt	1–7	(Australia) Mark Noske	(United States) Scott Pruett
Holden	Commodore VE	Lucas Dumbrell Motorsport	30	(Australia) Cameron McConville	8	(Australia) Mark Noske	(United States) Scott Pruett
Holden	Commodore VE	Lucas Dumbrell Motorsport	30	(Australia) Nathan Pretty	9–11	(Australia) Mark Noske	(United States) Scott Pruett
Holden	Commodore VE	Lucas Dumbrell Motorsport	30	(Australia) Warren Luff	12–14	(Australia) Mark Noske	(United States) Scott Pruett
Holden	Commodore VE	Garry Rogers Motorsport	33	(Australia) Lee Holdsworth	All	(Australia) David Besnard	(Australia) Greg Ritter
Holden	Commodore VE	Garry Rogers Motorsport	34	(Australia) Michael Caruso	All	(Australia) Greg Ritter	(United States) Patrick Long
Holden	Commodore VE	Paul Morris Motorsport	39	(Australia) Russell Ingall	All	(Australia) Paul Morris	(Australia) Jack Perkins
Holden	Commodore VE	Paul Morris Motorsport	51	(Australia) Paul Morris	1	(Australia) Tim Blanchard (Denmark) Allan Simonsen	(France) Yvan Muller
Holden	Commodore VE	Paul Morris Motorsport	51	(New Zealand) Greg Murphy	2–14	(Australia) Tim Blanchard (Denmark) Allan Simonsen	(France) Yvan Muller
Wildcard entries
Ford	Falcon BF	MW Motorsport	27	—N/a	9–10	(New Zealand) Ant Pedersen (Australia) Damien Assaillit	—N/a
Holden	Commodore VE	Greg Murphy Racing	44	—N/a	9–10	(Australia) Geoff Emery (Australia) Marcus Zukanovic	—N/a

=== Team changes ===
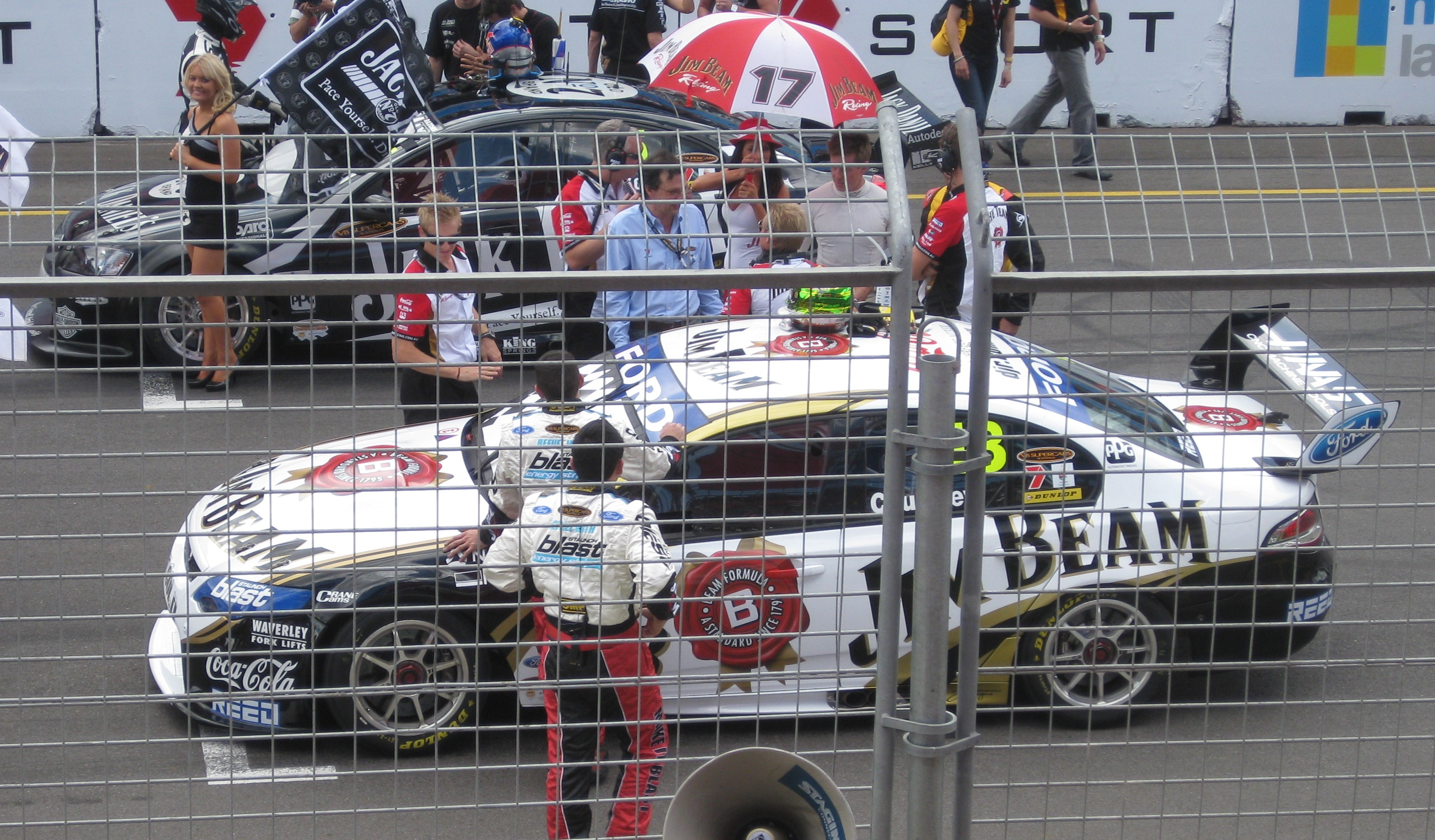
The Ford FG Falcon of 2010 champion James Courtney

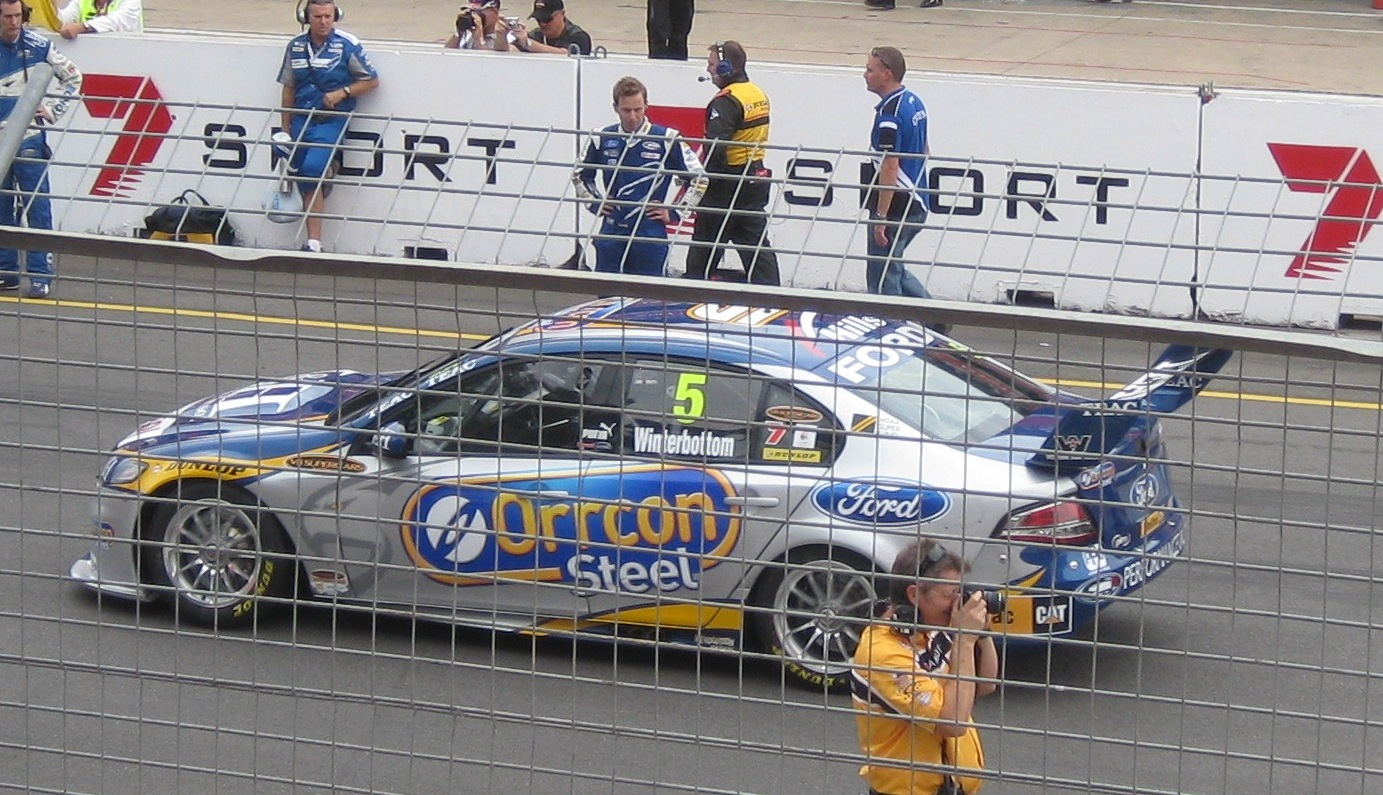
The Ford Performance Racing entered Ford FG Falcon of Mark Winterbottom at the 2010 Clipsal 500 in Adelaide.

Triple Eight Race Engineering switched from Ford to Holden following Ford's withdrawal of funding from all of their teams except for Ford Performance Racing and Stone Brothers Racing.

Rod Nash Racing, owners of the #55 Racing Entitlement Contract which was operated by Tony D'Alberto Racing in 2008 and 2009, became a customer team of Ford Performance Racing and as such moved from Holden to Ford.

James Rosenberg Racing was revived using the Racing Entitlement Contract (REC) of Paul Cruickshank Racing. The team used a customer Stone Brothers Racing Ford.

Tasman Motorsport was disbanded, with the team selling its RECs to Tony D'Alberto Racing and the newly formed Lucas Dumbrell Motorsport.

Jason Bright moved his Britek Motorsport license to operate it as a third car under Brad Jones Racing.

=== Driver changes ===
Paul Dumbrell moved from Walkinshaw Racing to join Rod Nash Racing in a manufacturer switch. Tony D'Alberto departed to drive for his newly formed team.

Fabian Coulthard was released from his Paul Cruickshank Racing contract to replace Dumbrell at Walkinshaw Racing. Andrew Thompson also joined Walkinshaw Racing after a year on the sidelines, replacing David Reynolds in an all-new lineup. Reynolds was left without a full-time drive and later joined the Holden Racing Team for the endurance events.

Tim Slade moved from Paul Morris Motorsport to the newly-formed James Rosenberg Racing. He was replaced by Greg Murphy, who came over from the defunct Tasman Motorsport.

Jason Bargwanna was announced as a new signing for Kelly Racing, joining the Kelly brothers. Multiple Sports Sedan Champion, Tony Ricciardello was confirmed to drive the fourth Kelly car. Jack Perkins and Mark McNally were left without full-time drives. Perkins later joined James Rosenberg Racing and Paul Morris Motorsport for the endurance events.

Jason Bright moved from Britek Motorsport to Brad Jones Racing as a result of the deal to utilise his REC as a third car. He replaced Cameron McConville, who was left without a full-time seat. Karl Reindler would drive the additional car.

Daniel Gaunt was announced as the driver for Lucas Dumbrell Motorsport.

=== Mid-season changes ===
Greg Murphy missed the opening round of the series at the Yas V8 400 due to a date clash with his hosting duties for Top Gear Live in New Zealand. Team principal Paul Morris replaced him for the event.

Jason Richards withdrew from the series prior to the Sandown Challenge to have surgery to remove a tumor. Andrew Jones took over the seat for the remainder of the season.

Daniel Gaunt was replaced by Cameron McConville after the Darwin Triple Crown, with Lucas Dumbrell Motorsport citing the need for an experienced driver to progress further. Nathan Pretty and Mark Noske drove the team's Commodore for the three endurance events. It was later announced that Warren Luff would be the team's driver for the rest of the season.

=== Wildcard entries ===
Three Fujitsu V8 Supercar Series teams were granted wildcard entries to the two co-driver endurance events, the Phillip Island 500 and the Bathurst 1000. The three teams, Greg Murphy Racing, MW Motorsport and Sieders Racing Team, were also the three teams who were granted wildcard entries in 2009. A fourth team, Adrenaline Motor Racing (who last raced at Bathurst as Novocastrian Motorsport in 1997), withdrew their application.

MW Motorsport subsequently confirmed it would use one of its own BF Falcons. The Sieders Racing Team later withdrew their wildcard entry after a budget shortfall.

== Rule changes ==
Full-time drivers were no longer allowed to partner one another for the endurance races at the L&H 500 at Phillip Island and the Supercheap Auto Bathurst 1000 at Mount Panorama in an effort to make both the championship and the endurance races more competitive.

For the Armor All Gold Coast 600, each team had to include a driver who races in an overseas series. The majority of nominated drivers were sourced from the IndyCar Series.

Following a failed attempt to get former champion Marcos Ambrose to make a one-off guest appearance at the 2009 Sydney Telstra 500, the V8 Supercars Executive Board approved plans to allow for one-off guest drives. The system would work in a similar fashion to the "Wildcard" entries that the series allows to drivers and teams from the Fujitsu Development Series to step up to the V8 Supercars during the endurance races. Ambrose had been earmarked as a target for such an appearance, with the series looking to allow international drivers to take part in the offshore races in Bahrain and Abu Dhabi at the start of the season.

== Race calendar ==
The following events made up the 2010 series. The proposed event for Queensland Raceway in early May was cancelled in January after V8 Supercar and circuit operators were unable to agree to terms. The Ipswich venue was later restored to the calendar. Barbagallo Raceway was later removed with V8 Supercar citing workplace health and safety regulations.

Calendar is as follows:

Event	Race	Event	Circuit	City / state	Date	Winner	Team	Report
1	1	(United Arab Emirates) Yas V8 400	Yas Marina Circuit	Yas Island, Abu Dhabi	18–20 Feb	Jamie Whincup	Triple Eight Race Engineering	report
1	2	(United Arab Emirates) Yas V8 400	Yas Marina Circuit	Yas Island, Abu Dhabi	18–20 Feb	Jamie Whincup	Triple Eight Race Engineering	report
2	3	(Bahrain) Desert 400	Bahrain International Circuit	Sakhir, Manama	25–27 Feb	Jamie Whincup	Triple Eight Race Engineering	report
2	4	(Bahrain) Desert 400	Bahrain International Circuit	Sakhir, Manama	25–27 Feb	Jamie Whincup	Triple Eight Race Engineering	report
3	5	(South Australia) Clipsal 500	Adelaide Street Circuit	Adelaide, South Australia	11–14 Mar	Garth Tander	Holden Racing Team	report
3	6	(South Australia) Clipsal 500	Adelaide Street Circuit	Adelaide, South Australia	11–14 Mar	Garth Tander	Holden Racing Team	report
4	7	(New Zealand) ITM Hamilton 400	Hamilton Street Circuit	Hamilton, Waikato	16–18 Apr	Jamie Whincup	Triple Eight Race Engineering	report
4	8	(New Zealand) ITM Hamilton 400	Hamilton Street Circuit	Hamilton, Waikato	16–18 Apr	Jamie Whincup	Triple Eight Race Engineering	report
5	9	(Queensland) City of Ipswich 300	Queensland Raceway	Ipswich, Queensland	30 Apr – 2 May	James Courtney	Dick Johnson Racing	report
5	10	(Queensland) City of Ipswich 300	Queensland Raceway	Ipswich, Queensland	30 Apr – 2 May	James Courtney	Dick Johnson Racing	report
6	11	(Victoria (state)) Winton Motor Raceway	Winton Motor Raceway	Benalla, Victoria	14–16 May	James Courtney	Dick Johnson Racing	report
6	12	(Victoria (state)) Winton Motor Raceway	Winton Motor Raceway	Benalla, Victoria	14–16 May	James Courtney	Dick Johnson Racing	report
7	13	(Northern Territory) Skycity Triple Crown	Hidden Valley Raceway	Darwin, Northern Territory	18–20 Jun	Mark Winterbottom	Ford Performance Racing	report
7	14	(Northern Territory) Skycity Triple Crown	Hidden Valley Raceway	Darwin, Northern Territory	18–20 Jun	Jamie Whincup	Triple Eight Race Engineering	report
8	15	(Queensland) Sucrogen Townsville 400	Reid Park Street Circuit	Townsville, Queensland	9–11 Jul	Jamie Whincup	Triple Eight Race Engineering	report
8	16	(Queensland) Sucrogen Townsville 400	Reid Park Street Circuit	Townsville, Queensland	9–11 Jul	Mark Winterbottom	Ford Performance Racing	report
9	17	(Victoria (state)) L&H 500	Phillip Island Grand Prix Circuit	Phillip Island, Victoria	10–12 Sep	Craig Lowndes; Mark Skaife	Triple Eight Race Engineering	report
10	18	(New South Wales) Supercheap Auto Bathurst 1000	Mount Panorama Circuit	Bathurst, New South Wales	7–10 Oct	Craig Lowndes; Mark Skaife	Triple Eight Race Engineering	report
11	19	(Queensland) Armor All Gold Coast 600	Surfers Paradise Street Circuit	Surfers Paradise, Queensland	21–24 Oct	Garth Tander; Cameron McConville	Holden Racing Team	report
11	20	(Queensland) Armor All Gold Coast 600	Surfers Paradise Street Circuit	Surfers Paradise, Queensland	21–24 Oct	Jamie Whincup; Steve Owen	Triple Eight Race Engineering	report
12	21	Falken Tasmania Challenge	Symmons Plains Raceway	Launceston, Tasmania	12–14 Nov	Craig Lowndes	Triple Eight Race Engineering	report
12	22	Falken Tasmania Challenge	Symmons Plains Raceway	Launceston, Tasmania	12–14 Nov	Mark Winterbottom	Ford Performance Racing	report
13	23	(Victoria (state)) Norton 360 Sandown Challenge	Sandown Raceway	Melbourne, Victoria	19–21 Nov	Paul Dumbrell	Rod Nash Racing	report
13	24	(Victoria (state)) Norton 360 Sandown Challenge	Sandown Raceway	Melbourne, Victoria	19–21 Nov	James Courtney	Dick Johnson Racing	report
14	25	(New South Wales) Sydney Telstra 500	Homebush Street Circuit	Sydney, New South Wales	3–5 Dec	Jonathon Webb	Tekno Autosports	report
14	26	(New South Wales) Sydney Telstra 500	Homebush Street Circuit	Sydney, New South Wales	3–5 Dec	Lee Holdsworth	Garry Rogers Motorsport	report
Maps of event locations
2010 V8 Supercar Championship Series is located in Persian Gulf 2010 V8 Supercar Championship Series is located in Australia 2010 V8 Supercar Championship Series is located in New Zealand

== Publicity ==
Immediately prior to the season start, V8 Supercar launched a new publicity campaign, centred around American singer Pink and her 2001 recording Get the Party Started. The advertising campaign is called "The Greatest Show on Wheels" and is the first of a three-year deal between V8 Supercar and Pink.

== Points system ==
Points are awarded to the driver or drivers of a car that completes 75% of the race distance and is running at the completion of the final lap.

Pos	1st	2nd	3rd	4th	5th	6th	7th	8th	9th	10th	11th	12th	13th	14th	15th	16th	17th	18th	19th	20th	21st	22nd	23rd	24th	25th	26th	27th	28th	29th	30th
Std	150	138	129	120	111	102	96	90	84	78	72	69	66	63	60	57	54	51	48	45	42	39	36	33	30	27	24	21	18	—N/a
L&H 500 Qual	50	46	43	40	37	34	32	30	28	26	24	23	22	21	20	19	18	17	16	15	14	13	12	11	10	9	8	7	6	—N/a
L&H 500 Feature	200	184	172	160	148	136	128	120	112	104	96	92	88	84	80	76	72	68	64	60	56	52	48	44	40	36	32	28	24	20
Bathurst	300	276	258	240	222	204	192	180	168	156	144	138	132	126	120	114	108	102	96	90	84	78	72	66	60	54	48	42	36	30

NOTES:

Std denotes all races except the L&H 500, Bathurst 1000, and Surfers Paradise. These three races have unique rules.

L&H 500: The Phillip Island event was split into two qualifying races and a 500 km feature race. The two drivers per team were grouped into separate qualifying races that counted towards drivers' individual point totals and towards the starting grid for the feature race. The two drivers then shared one car for the 500 km endurance race.

Bathurst: Two drivers shared one car for the race.

Armor All Gold Coast 600: Each V8 Supercar team was required to have an international driver included in its driver lineup for each 300 km race. The international driver was required to complete 30% of the race distance. The event was run under a National permit, allowing International licence holders to compete but not to score championship points. This differed from the Bathurst event which was run under an International permit.

== Championship standings ==
=== Drivers Championship ===
Pos.	Driver	No.	YMC (United Arab Emirates)		BHR (Bahrain)		ADE (South Australia)		HAM (New Zealand)		QLD (Queensland)		WIN (Victoria (state))		HID (Northern Territory)		TOW (Queensland)		PHI (Victoria (state))	BAT (New South Wales)	SUR (Queensland)		SYM (Tasmania)		SAN (Victoria (state))		SYD (New South Wales)		Pen.	Pts.
1	(Australia) James Courtney	18	4	6	6	7	2	2	3	21	1	1	**1**	1	5	4	5	2	12	5	10	4	11	12	4	1	15	14	0	3055
2	(Australia) Jamie Whincup	1	**1**	1	**1**	**1**	**4**	18	**1**	1	4	**Ret**	3	24	2	1	**1**	**23**	**29**	2	6	1	6	15	**2**	3	Ret	5	0	2990
3	(Australia) Mark Winterbottom	5	3	**2**	2	2	21	3	7	DSQ	9	Ret	15	6	**1**	2	3	1	2	**9**	21	**3**	5	**1**	3	2	Ret	Ret	0	2729
4	(Australia) Craig Lowndes	888	2	5	3	12	19	16	4	19	2	5	2	2	7	5	26	Ret	1	1	2	10	1	Ret	8	11	Ret	6	0	2669
5	(Australia) Garth Tander	2	26	Ret	4	Ret	1	**1**	2	**2**	**5**	2	17	8	10	19	2	3	9	3	**1**	Ret	**2**	6	Ret	17	Ret	9	0	2466
6	(New Zealand) Shane van Gisbergen	9	6	3	5	3	22	4	Ret	7	3	3	5	12	3	3	8	7	27	21	3	2	13	11	9	Ret	Ret	3	10	2391
7	(Australia) Lee Holdsworth	33	5	7	12	5	3	11	10	4	7	23	10	3	22	12	4	15	Ret	7	19	9	10	10	6	4	**7**	**1**	15	2387
8	(Australia) Rick Kelly	15	10	4	9	4	23	6	8	6	8	7	18	**4**	14	9	15	13	4	16	14	6	14	25	7	8	3	7	20	2347
9	(Australia) Paul Dumbrell	55	7	12	27	10	5	5	9	20	21	19	28	10	8	23	10	4	7	14	22	5	4	2	1	**7**	10	15	0	2232
10	(Australia) Steven Johnson	17	11	8	11	11	12	8	6	DSQ	6	8	4	14	18	16	11	22	16	12	16	Ret	17	13	13	5	4	4	10	2006
11	(Australia) Michael Caruso	34	15	11	10	9	8	10	5	3	25	6	8	5	17	15	19	11	11	10	4	11	9	20	16	Ret	6	8	100	2004
12	(Australia) Russell Ingall	39	27	9	7	13	10	19	Ret	12	14	4	11	16	11	25	6	Ret	8	8	12	8	7	4	5	13	12	20	10	1967
13	(Australia) Jonathon Webb	19	8	18	14	16	15	15	13	10	10	12	26	11	24	13	16	9	6	19	8	16	18	16	20	9	1	10	45	1852
14	(Australia) Jason Bright	14	21	10	13	24	6	26	21	13	13	11	7	Ret	12	20	Ret	18	Ret	4	7	Ret	12	3	14	24	2	Ret	10	1642
15	(New Zealand) Steven Richards	6	16	17	Ret	15	17	13	24	DSQ	27	9	14	21	Ret	10	9	5	21	11	Ret	13	8	9	12	15	11	2	10	1630
16	(Australia) Tim Slade	47	14	13	21	18	Ret	17	Ret	16	16	17	12	7	6	6	12	12	5	18	18	19	19	18	18	6	Ret	Ret	0	1595
17	(New Zealand) Jason Richards	8	12	21	19	8	Ret	9	11	11	22	13	19	13	4	7	7	8	3	23	15	Ret	16	22					0	1547
18	(Australia) Todd Kelly	7	25	26	20	Ret	13	12	20	8	29	14	6	22	9	8	17	19	18	20	20	Ret	15	7	11	19	Ret	21	0	1435
19	(New Zealand) Greg Murphy	51			16	22	Ret	Ret	18	15	23	Ret	13	15	16	18	23	17	13	6	13	15	3	5	23	10	Ret	12	10	1432
20	(Australia) Tony D'Alberto	3	18	19	23	19	14	7	12	Ret	11	10	9	9	13	17	Ret	Ret	15	Ret	Ret	17	21	24	25	14	13	11	0	1325
21	(Australia) Alex Davison	4	9	27	18	17	11	23	17	Ret	28	21	16	17	15	**Ret**	13	14	10	13	5	Ret	20	19	15	21	Ret	23	35	1317
22	(Australia) Will Davison	22	Ret	14	8	6	9	14	Ret	5	15	16	22	18	Ret	11	18	6	28	Ret	Ret	7	22	Ret	10	Ret	Ret	Ret	0	1236
23	(New Zealand) Fabian Coulthard	24	17	16	17	Ret	7	27	22	Ret	12	20	20	Ret	23	14	14	Ret	19	Ret	17	12	27	8	28	12	5	19	0	1229
24	(Australia) Jason Bargwanna	11	13	15	15	14	Ret	24	15	9	19	Ret	23	Ret	19	21	22	10	20	Ret	11	20	Ret	17	17	20	9	22	15	1208
25	(Australia) Dean Fiore	12	20	22	Ret	20	16	22	Ret	14	18	15	24	Ret	20	22	20	21	14	Ret	Ret	14	23	23	19	18	14	16	10	1070
26	(Australia) Tony Ricciardello	16	24	25	25	21	20	21	23	Ret	26	22	27	20	25	27	25	20	25	22	Ret	18	26	Ret	26	23	Ret	17	0	857
27	(Australia) Karl Reindler	21	Ret	23	24	Ret	Ret	20	16	18	24	Ret	21	23	Ret	26	21	Ret	17	15	9	Ret	Ret	14	24	22	Ret	Ret	15	823
28	(Australia) Warren Luff	18/30																	12	5	10	4	25	21	27	Ret	Ret	18	0	721
29	(Australia) Cameron McConville	30/2															24	16	9	3	1	Ret							0	669
30	(Australia) Andrew Thompson	10	19	20	22	Ret	DNS	DNS	14	DNS	20	Ret	Ret	25	21	24	Ret	Ret	26	25	Ret	Ret	24	Ret	22	16	8	Ret	10	667
31	(Australia) Steve Owen	1																	**29**	2	6	1							0	623
32	(Australia) Luke Youlden	5																	2	9	21	3							0	578
33	(Australia) Mark Skaife	888																	1	1									0	560
34	(New Zealand) Daniel Gaunt	30	22	24	26	23	18	25	19	17	17	18	25	19	26	28													10	539
35	(Australia) Owen Kelly	15																	4	16	14	6							0	501
36	(Australia) Andrew Jones	8																	3	23	15	Ret			21	Ret	Ret	13	0	461
37	(Australia) Jack Perkins	47/39																	5	18	12	8							0	452
38	(New Zealand) John McIntyre	9																	27	21	3	2							0	442
39	(Australia) Greg Ritter	34/33																	11	10	19	9							10	387
40	(Australia) Paul Morris	51/39	23	DNS															8	8									10	356
41	(Australia) Dean Canto	55																	7	14									0	309
42	(Australia) David Russell	19																	6	19									0	274
43	(New Zealand) Matt Halliday	14																	Ret	4									0	269
44	(Australia) Marcus Marshall	17																	16	12									0	261
45	(Australia) Dale Wood	7/16																	18	20	Ret	18							0	253
46	(Australia) James Moffat	6																	21	11									0	251
47	(Australia) David Besnard	33																	Ret	7									0	233
48	(Australia) David Wall	21																	17	15									0	217
49	(Denmark) Allan Simonsen	51																		6									0	204
50	(Australia) David Reynolds	22/24																	28	Ret	17	12							0	201
51	(Australia) Nathan Pretty	30																	24	17	Ret	Ret							0	182
51	(Australia) Mark Noske	30																	24	17									0	182
53	(Australia) Geoff Emery	44																	23	24									0	142
53	(Australia) Marcus Zukanovic	44																	23	24									0	142
55	(Australia) Taz Douglas	16																	25	22									0	140
56	(Australia) Damian Assaillit	27																	22	26									0	137
56	(New Zealand) Ant Pedersen	27																	22	26									0	137
58	(Australia) Michael Patrizi	12																	14	Ret									0	123
59	(Australia) Tim Blanchard	51																	13										0	122
60	(Australia) Shane Price	3																	15	Ret									0	116
61	(Australia) Glenn Seton	11																	20	Ret									0	113
62	(New Zealand) Craig Baird	24																	19	Ret									0	98
63	(Australia) Nick Percat	10																	26										0	53
Pos.	Driver	No.	YMC (United Arab Emirates)		BHR (Bahrain)		ADE (South Australia)		HAM (New Zealand)		QLD (Queensland)		WIN (Victoria (state))		HID (Northern Territory)		TOW (Queensland)		PHI (Victoria (state))	BAT (New South Wales)	SUR (Queensland)		SYM (Tasmania)		SAN (Victoria (state))		SYD (New South Wales)		Pen.	Pts.

Colour	Result
Gold	Winner
Silver	Second place
Bronze	Third place
Green	Points classification
Blue	Non-points classification
Blue	Non-classified finish (NC)
Purple	Retired, not classified (Ret)
Red	Did not qualify (DNQ)
Red	Did not pre-qualify (DNPQ)
Black	Disqualified (DSQ)
White	Did not start (DNS)
White	Withdrew (WD)
White	Race cancelled (C)
Blank	Did not practice (DNP)
Blank	Did not arrive (DNA)
Blank	Excluded (EX)

Bold - Pole position
Italics - Fastest lap

=== Teams Championship ===
Pos.	Team	No.	YMC (United Arab Emirates)		BHR (Bahrain)		ADE (South Australia)		HAM (New Zealand)		QLD (Queensland)		WIN (Victoria (state))		HID (Northern Territory)		TOW (Queensland)		PHI (Victoria (state))	BAT (New South Wales)	SUR (Queensland)		SYM (Tasmania)		SAN (Victoria (state))		SYD (New South Wales)		Pen.	Pts.
1	Triple Eight Race Engineering	1	**1**	1	**1**	**1**	**4**	18	**1**	1	4	**Ret**	3	24	2	1	**1**	**23**	29	2	6	1	6	15	**2**	3	Ret	5	0	5659
1	Triple Eight Race Engineering	888	2	5	3	12	19	16	4	19	2	5	2	2	7	5	26	Ret	1	1	2	10	1	Ret	8	11	Ret	6	0	5659
2	Dick Johnson Racing	17	11	8	11	11	12	8	6	DSQ	6	8	4	14	18	16	11	22	16	12	16	Ret	17	13	13	5	4	4	0	5071
2	Dick Johnson Racing	18	4	6	6	7	2	2	3	21	1	1	**1**	1	5	4	5	2	12	5	10	4	11	12	4	1	15	14	0	5071
3	Garry Rogers Motorsport	33	5	7	12	5	3	11	10	4	7	23	10	3	22	12	4	15	Ret	7	19	21	10	10	6	4	**7**	**1**	20	4486
3	Garry Rogers Motorsport	34	15	11	10	9	8	10	5	3	25	6	8	5	17	15	19	11	11	10	4	11	9	20	16	Ret	6	8	20	4486
4	Ford Performance Racing	5	3	**2**	2	2	21	3	7	DSQ	9	Ret	15	6	**1**	2	3	1	2	**9**	21	**3**	5	**1**	3	2	Ret	Ret	0	4369
4	Ford Performance Racing	6	16	17	Ret	15	17	13	24	DSQ	27	9	14	21	Ret	10	9	5	21	11	Ret	13	8	9	12	15	11	2	0	4369
5	Jack Daniels Racing	7	25	26	20	Ret	13	12	20	8	29	14	6	22	9	8	17	19	18	20	20	Ret	15	7	11	19	Ret	21	0	3797
5	Jack Daniels Racing	15	10	4	9	4	23	6	8	6	8	7	18	**4**	14	9	15	13	**4**	16	14	6	14	25	7	8	3	7	0	3797
6	Stone Brothers Racing	4	9	27	18	17	11	23	17	Ret	28	21	16	17	15	**Ret**	13	14	10	13	5	Ret	20	19	15	21	Ret	23	0	3753
6	Stone Brothers Racing	9	6	3	5	3	22	4	Ret	7	3	3	5	12	3	3	8	7	27	9	3	2	13	11	9	Ret	Ret	3	0	3753
7	Holden Racing Team	2	26	Ret	4	Ret	1	**1**	2	**2**	**5**	2	17	8	10	19	2	3	9	3	**1**	Ret	**2**	6	Ret	17	Ret	9	0	3618
7	Holden Racing Team	22	Ret	14	8	6	9	14	Ret	5	15	16	22	18	Ret	11	18	6	28	Ret	Ret	7	22	Ret	10	Ret	Ret	Ret	0	3618
8	Paul Morris Motorsport	39	27	9	7	13	10	19	Ret	12	14	4	11	16	11	25	6	Ret	8	8	12	8	7	4	5	13	12	20	0	3455
8	Paul Morris Motorsport	51	23	DNS	16	22	Ret	Ret	18	15	23	Ret	13	15	16	18	23	17	13	6	13	15	3	5	23	10	Ret	12	0	3455
9	Brad Jones Racing	8	12	21	19	8	Ret	9	11	11	22	13	19	13	4	7	7	8	3	11	15	Ret	16	22	21	Ret	Ret	13	100	3207
9	Brad Jones Racing	14	21	10	13	24	6	26	21	13	13	11	7	Ret	12	20	Ret	18	Ret	4	7	Ret	12	3	14	24	2	Ret	100	3207
10	Rod Nash Racing (s)	55	7	12	27	10	5	5	9	20	21	19	28	10	8	23	10	4	7	14	22	5	4	2	1	**7**	10	15	0	2232
11	Kelly Racing	11	13	15	15	14	Ret	24	15	9	19	Ret	23	Ret	19	21	22	10	20	Ret	11	20	Ret	17	17	20	9	22	0	2080
11	Kelly Racing	16	24	25	25	21	20	21	23	Ret	26	22	27	20	25	27	25	20	25	22	Ret	18	26	Ret	26	23	Ret	17	0	2080
12	Walkinshaw Racing	10	19	20	22	Ret	DNS	DNS	14	DNS	20	Ret	Ret	25	21	24	Ret	Ret	26	25	Ret	Ret	24	Ret	22	16	8	Ret	0	1906
12	Walkinshaw Racing	24	17	16	17	Ret	7	27	22	Ret	12	20	20	Ret	23	14	14	Ret	19	Ret	17	12	27	8	28	12	5	19	0	1906
13	Tekno Autosports (s)	19	8	18	14	16	15	15	13	10	10	12	26	11	24	13	16	9	6	19	20	16	18	16	20	9	1	10	0	1897
14	James Rosenberg Racing (s)	47	14	13	21	18	Ret	17	Ret	16	16	17	12	7	6	6	12	12	5	18	18	19	19	18	18	6	Ret	Ret	0	1595
15	Tony D'Alberto Racing (s)	3	18	19	23	19	14	7	12	Ret	11	10	9	9	13	17	Ret	Ret	15	Ret	Ret	17	21	24	25	14	13	11	0	1325
16	Triple F Racing (s)	12	20	22	Ret	20	16	22	Ret	14	18	15	24	Ret	20	22	20	21	14	Ret	Ret	14	23	23	19	18	14	16	0	1080
17	Lucas Dumbrell Motorsport (s)	30	22	24	26	23	18	25	19	17	17	18	25	19	26	28	24	16	24	17	Ret	Ret	25	21	27	Ret	Ret	18	0	968
18	Britek Motorsport (s)	21	Ret	23	24	Ret	Ret	20	16	18	24	Ret	21	23	Ret	26	21	Ret	17	15	9	Ret	Ret	14	24	22	Ret	Ret	0	838
19	Greg Murphy Racing (w)	44																	23	24									0	142
20	MW Motorsport (w)	27																	22	26									0	137
Pos.	Team	No.	YMC (United Arab Emirates)		BHR (Bahrain)		ADE (South Australia)		HAM (New Zealand)		QLD (Queensland)		WIN (Victoria (state))		HID (Northern Territory)		TOW (Queensland)		PHI (Victoria (state))	BAT (New South Wales)	SUR (Queensland)		SYM (Tasmania)		SAN (Victoria (state))		SYD (New South Wales)		Pen.	Pts.

Colour	Result
Gold	Winner
Silver	Second place
Bronze	Third place
Green	Points classification
Blue	Non-points classification
Blue	Non-classified finish (NC)
Purple	Retired, not classified (Ret)
Red	Did not qualify (DNQ)
Red	Did not pre-qualify (DNPQ)
Black	Disqualified (DSQ)
White	Did not start (DNS)
White	Withdrew (WD)
White	Race cancelled (C)
Blank	Did not practice (DNP)
Blank	Did not arrive (DNA)
Blank	Excluded (EX)

Bold - Pole position
Italics - Fastest lap

- (s) denotes a single-car team.
- (w) denotes a wildcard Fujitsu series team.

=== Champion Manufacturer of the Year ===
Holden took out the Champion Manufacturer of the Year award, having clinched the title at the Gold Coast 600 event with its 14th race win of the year. The award is given to the manufacturer that scores the most race wins during the Championship season.

== See also ==
2010 V8 Supercar season
