= Andrew Thompson (racing driver) =

Australian racing driver (born 1987)

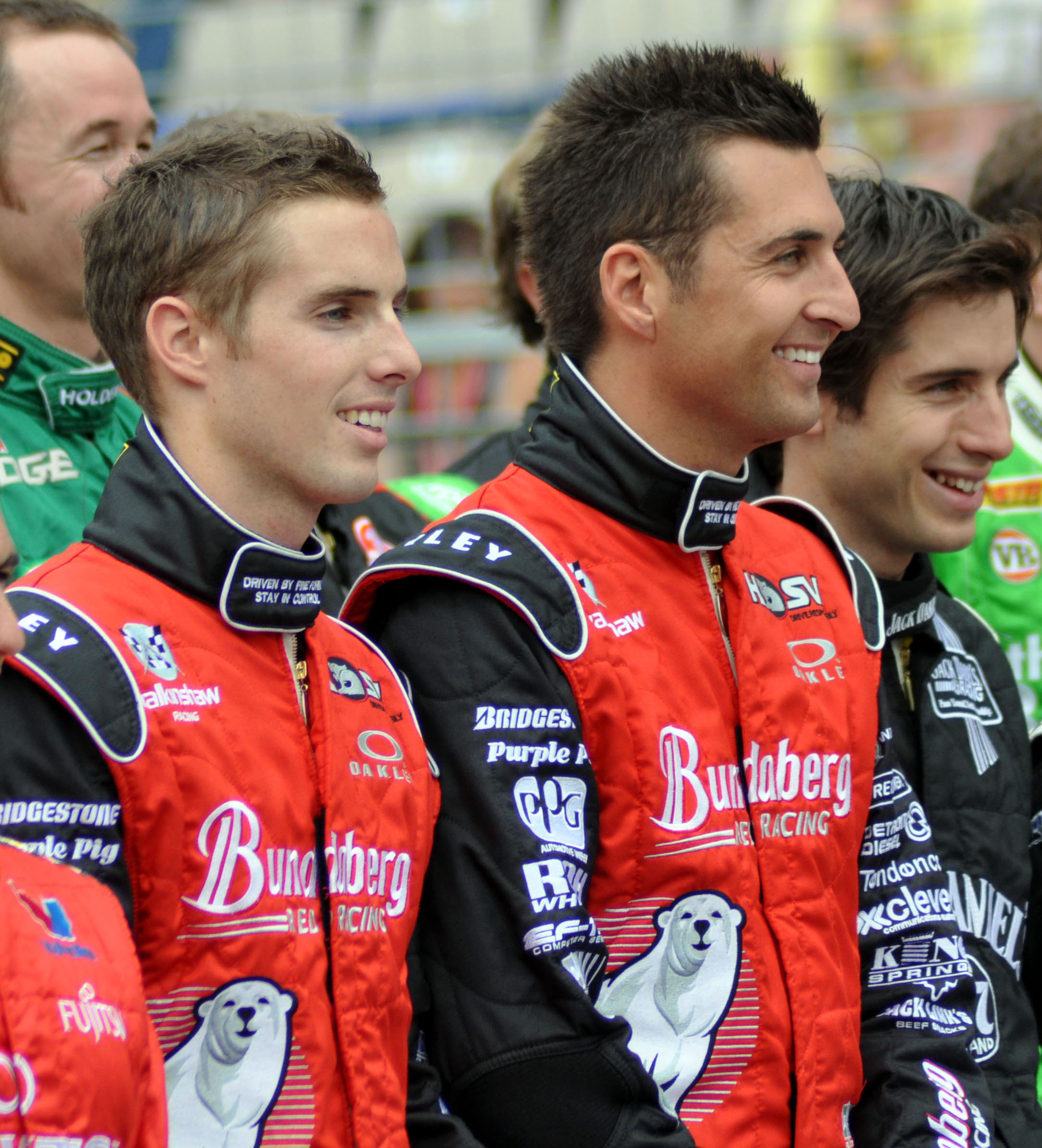
- Thompson (left) in 2010
- Nationality: (Australia) Australian
- Born: 3 November 1987 (age 39) Byron Bay, New South Wales

Fujitsu V8 Supercar Series career
- Debut season: 2006
- Former teams: Dick Johnson Racing; Howard Racing; Triple Eight Race Engineering
- Starts: 33
- Wins: 8
- Poles: 4
- Fastest laps: 6
- Best finish: 1st in 2011

Previous series
- 2004–05 2007–13: Australian Formula Ford; V8 Supercar Champ. Series

Championship titles
- 2011 Fujitsu V8 Supercar Series

Supercars Championship career
- Championships: 0
- Races: 35
- Wins: 0
- Podiums: 1
- Pole positions: 0

Andrew Thompson (born 3 November 1987 in Byron Bay, New South Wales) is an Australian former racing driver.

== Racing career ==
=== Karts ===
Thompson has a successful career in junior karting. His biggest win was the Australian National Sprint Kart Championship - Junior Piston Port in 2002.

=== Formula Ford ===
Thompson's circuit racing career began in Formula Ford where in the 2004 season placed him into the then new Spectrum 010 chassis and finished eleventh in his only full-time season in the Australian Formula Ford Championship.

== V8 Supercar ==
=== Dick Johnson Racing ===
2005 saw a partial season in Formula Ford as he focused on making the transition to V8 Supercar. 2006 saw his V8 Supercar debut racing in Dick Johnson Racing's three car team in the second tier Fujitsu V8 Supercars Series alongside teammates Grant Denyer and Marcus La Delle. Thompson finished the season in eighth position, one spot ahead of Denyer. His season highlight was winning the sixth round of the series at Mount Panorama, winning both races at the meeting where Mark Porter was killed.

DJR did not run a team in the Fujitsu series in 2007 but Thompson moved across to the series champions, Howard Racing but only completed a partial season with the team. Thompson did however take two further wins at the third round of the series at Winton Motor Raceway.

Thompson returned to Dick Johnson Racing for the endurance race season where he co-drove with Alex Davison in the team's second car. While no points were received at the Sandown 500, Bathurst was a different story with the #18 Falcon racing well all day with Davison on the fringe of the fight for the lead at races end. Eighth was an excellent reward for the duo, backing up team leaders Steven Johnson and Will Davison who finished third.

=== Paul Weel Racing ===
There was much speculation about Thompson joining Ford Rising Stars Racing full-time for season 2008, so it was a slight surprise when Paul Weel Racing announced Thompson would drive for the team in 2008 after the team had previously announced it would be closing and selling its franchises.

=== Rod Nash Racing ===
In 2009, Thompson joined Tony D'Alberto in the #55 The Bottle-O Racing Commodore for the endurance events at Phillip Island and Bathurst. At Phillip Island, the team finished in 15th position, and Bathurst, the team finished in the top-ten, in tenth position.

=== Walkinshaw Racing ===
Thompson rejoined the series full-time for the 2010 season, joining Walkinshaw Racing to drive the team's #10 Commodore. Thompson finished 30th in the standings, behind numerous part-time drivers, and left the team at season's end.

=== Triple Eight Race Engineering ===
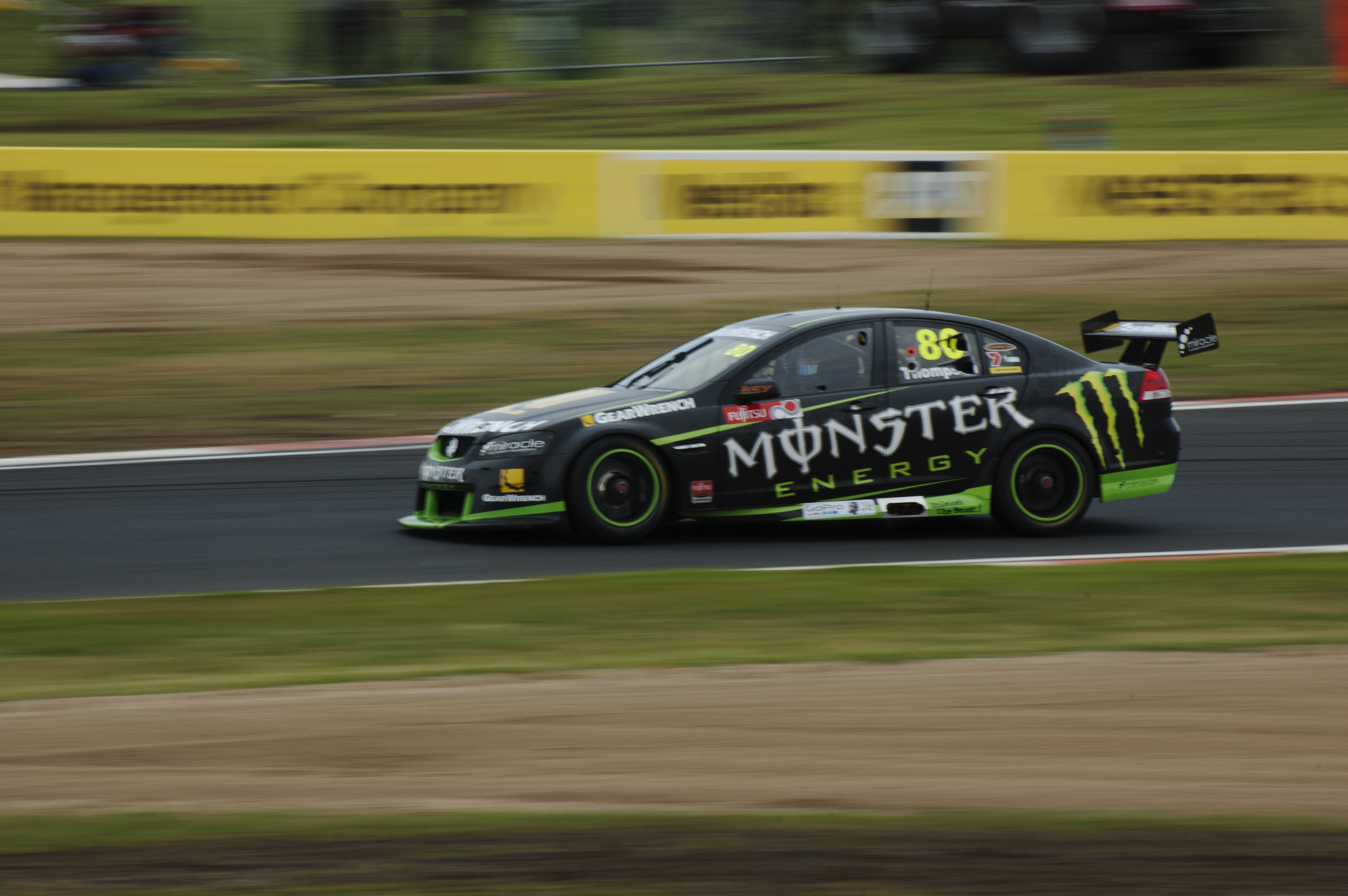
Thompson competing for Triple Eight in the 2011 Fujitsu V8 Supercar Series.

For 2011, Thompson joined Team Vodafone for the endurance events. This led to the team entering a Monster Energy backed car in the Fujitsu V8 series. At the endurance events, Thompson was paired with two-time V8 Supercar champion, Jamie Whincup. At Phillip Island, the #88 Commodore finished in second place, behind the team's #888 Commodore of Craig Lowndes and Mark Skaife, however at Bathurst Thompson and Whincup finished in 21st position due to Electrical issues. Thompson however won the Fujitsu Series for the team.

== Career results ==
Thompson had the following results:

Season	Series	Position	Car	Team
2004	Australian Formula Ford Championship	11th	Spectrum 010 Ford	Borland Racing
2004	Victorian Formula Ford Championship	4th	Spectrum 09b Ford	
2005	Australian Formula Ford Championship	17th	Spectrum 010 Ford	Borland Racing
2006	Fujitsu V8 Supercars Series	8th	Ford Falcon (BA)	Dick Johnson Racing
2007	Fujitsu V8 Supercars Series	11th	Ford Falcon (BA)	Howard Racing
2007	V8 Supercar Championship Series	36th	Ford Falcon (BF)	Dick Johnson Racing
2008	V8 Supercar Championship Series	28th	Holden Commodore (VE)	Paul Weel Racing
2009	V8 Supercar Championship Series	35th	Holden Commodore (VE)	Tony D'Alberto Racing
2010	V8 Supercar Championship Series	30th	Holden Commodore (VE)	Walkinshaw Racing
2011	Fujitsu V8 Supercars Series	1st	Holden Commodore (VE)	Triple Eight Race Engineering
2011	International V8 Supercars Championship	38th	Holden Commodore (VE)	Triple Eight Race Engineering
2012	International V8 Supercars Championship	35th	Ford Falcon (FG)	James Rosenberg Racing
2013	International V8 Supercars Championship	58th	Mercedes-Benz E63 AMG	Erebus Motorsport

=== Complete Bathurst 1000 results ===
Year	Team	Car	Co-driver	Position	Laps
2007	Dick Johnson Racing	Ford Falcon (BF)	(Australia) Alex Davison	8th	161
2008	Paul Weel Racing	Holden Commodore (VE)	(Australia) Paul Weel	DNS	0
2009	Rod Nash Racing	Holden Commodore VE	(Australia) Tony D'Alberto	10th	161
2010	Walkinshaw Racing	Holden Commodore VE	(Australia) Ryan Briscoe	25th	154
2011	Triple Eight Race Engineering	Holden Commodore VE	(Australia) Jamie Whincup	21st	160
2012	James Rosenberg Racing	Ford Falcon (FG)	(Australia) Tim Slade	7th	161
2013	James Rosenberg Racing	Mercedes-Benz E63 AMG	(Australia) Tim Slade	26th	137

Sporting positions
Preceded by Steve Owen	Winner of the Fujitsu V8 Supercars Series; 2011	Succeeded by Scott McLaughlin
Awards and achievements
Preceded by Adam Graham	Jon Targett Perpetual Karting Trophy; 2000	Succeeded by Tim Slade
