= Triple F Racing =

Australian motor racing team (2009–2012)

- Debut: 2009
- Final Season: 2012
- Round wins: 0
- Pole positions: 0
- 2012 position: 14th (1470 pts)

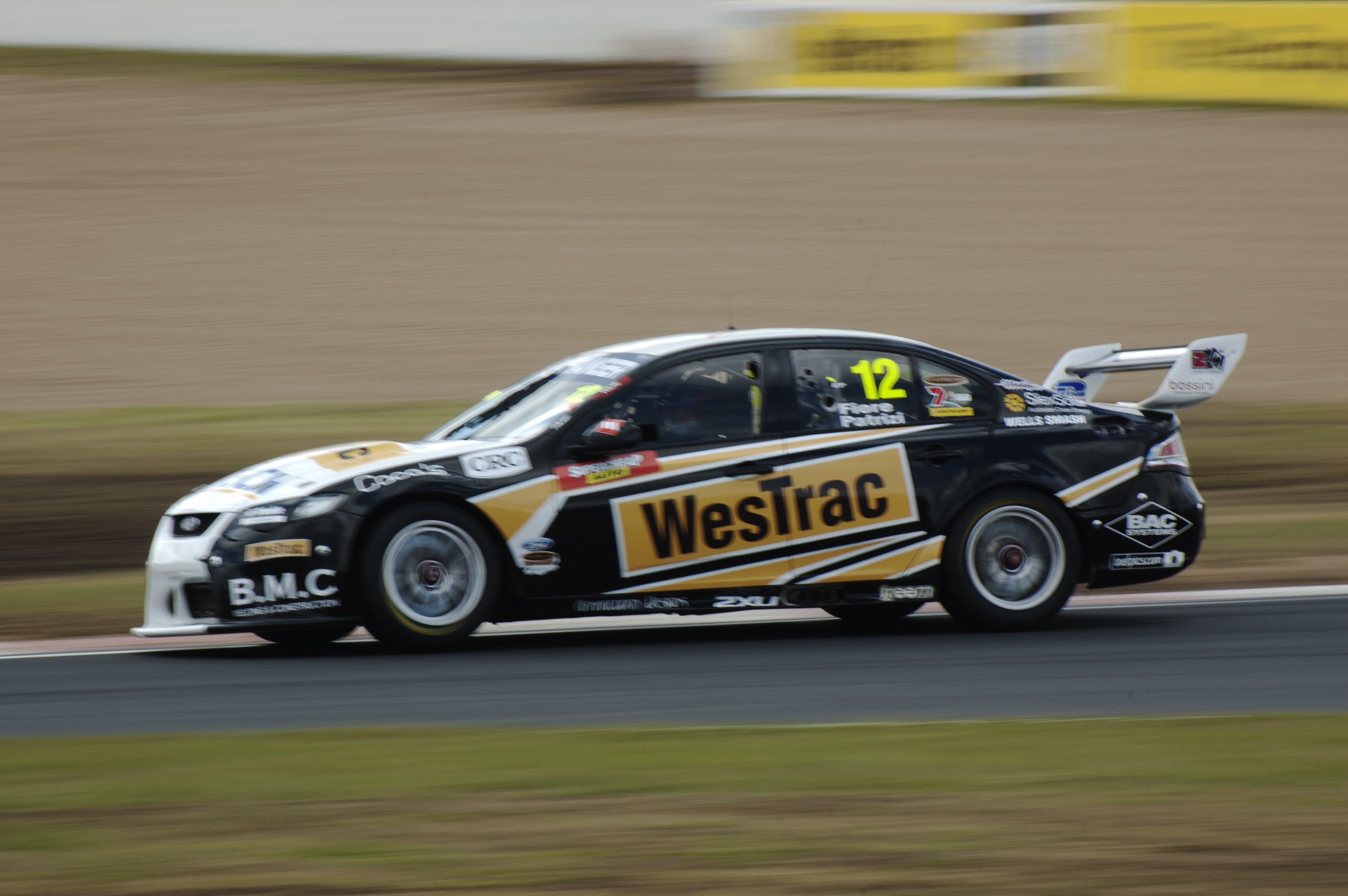
Dean Fiore and Michael Patrizi at the 2011 Bathurst 1000.

Triple F Racing was an Australian motor racing team that competed in the International V8 Supercars Championship between 2009 and 2012. The team was based on the Gold Coast in Queensland but continued to have strong links with the team's original home in Perth.

In its final two years its Racing Entitlement Contract (REC) was leased to Dick Johnson Racing. At the end of 2012 the REC was returned to the issueing organisation, V8 Supercars Australia, formally ending its participation in V8 Supercar.

== History ==
The team was formed by the West Australian Fiore racing family, with the team name referencing the three Fiore brothers Dean, Paul and Todd. The team raced out of Western Australia for many years running mainly in state level series in Formula Ford and Saloon Car racing. After the collapse of Team Kiwi Racing as a V8 Supercar team in early 2009, Triple F Racing was created to keep Dean Fiore, who had been racing the Holden VE Commodore utilising the Team Kiwi Racing REC, but the car was in essence a third car for the Paul Morris Motorsport team. Triple F Racing formally took over the car as of the Winton round of the 2009 series. In keeping with results achieved by second and/or third Paul Morris Motorsport supported vehicles, results were modest.

For the 2010 season, a Ford FG Falcon was acquired from Paul Cruikshank Racing and the team moved into their own workshop on the Gold Coast. Dean Fiore moved up the grid in terms of performance with the later model car. The former VE Commodore was used by Paul and Todd Fiore in the second-tier Development Series until round 5 where the team debuted an ex Triple 8 BF Falcon, which was used for the rest of the season. Michael Patrizi was the team's co-driver in the endurance races.

In 2011 season. the team continued with the FG Falcon, while the BF Falcon was used by the team in the V8 Supercar Development Series. Patrizi was retained as the team's endurance driver.

In 2012, the REC, Fiore and car moved to become a third Dick Johnson Racing entry. Matt Halliday co-drove in the endurance events.

In 2013 the REC remained with Dick Johnson with Jonny Reid and later Chaz Mostert driving a new Ford FG Falcon, with Dean Fiore driving a Holden VF Commodore for Lucas Dumbrell Motorsport. At the end of the season the REC was returned by Dick Johnson Racing, and after unsuccessfully trying to raise sponsorship for a 2014 campaign, was returned to V8 Supercars Australia.

In addition to the V8 Supercar team, the original West Australian based Triple F Racing continued to support Paul Fiore racing Holden Commodore in Saloon Cars, and Todd Fiore in Formula Ford during the 2009 season.

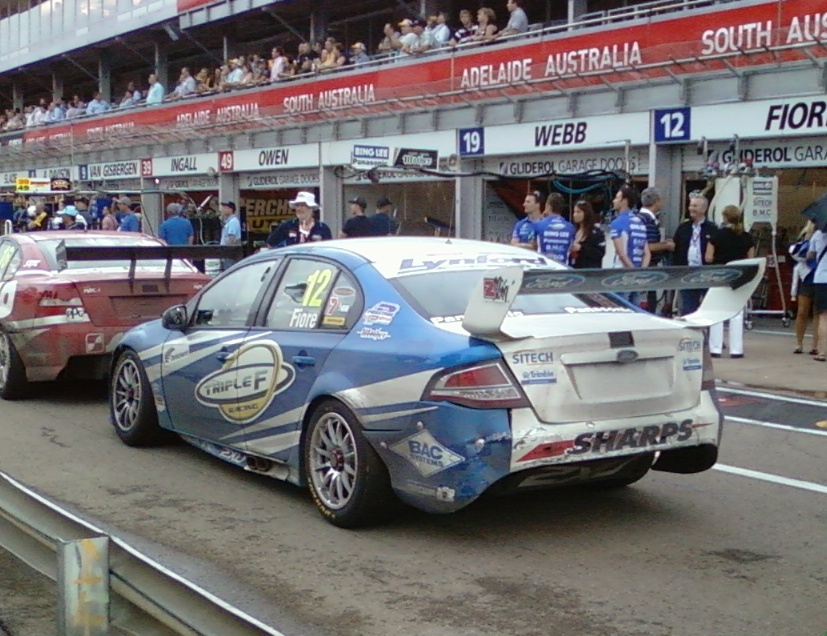
Ford FG Falcon of Dean Fiore at the 2011 Clipsal 500

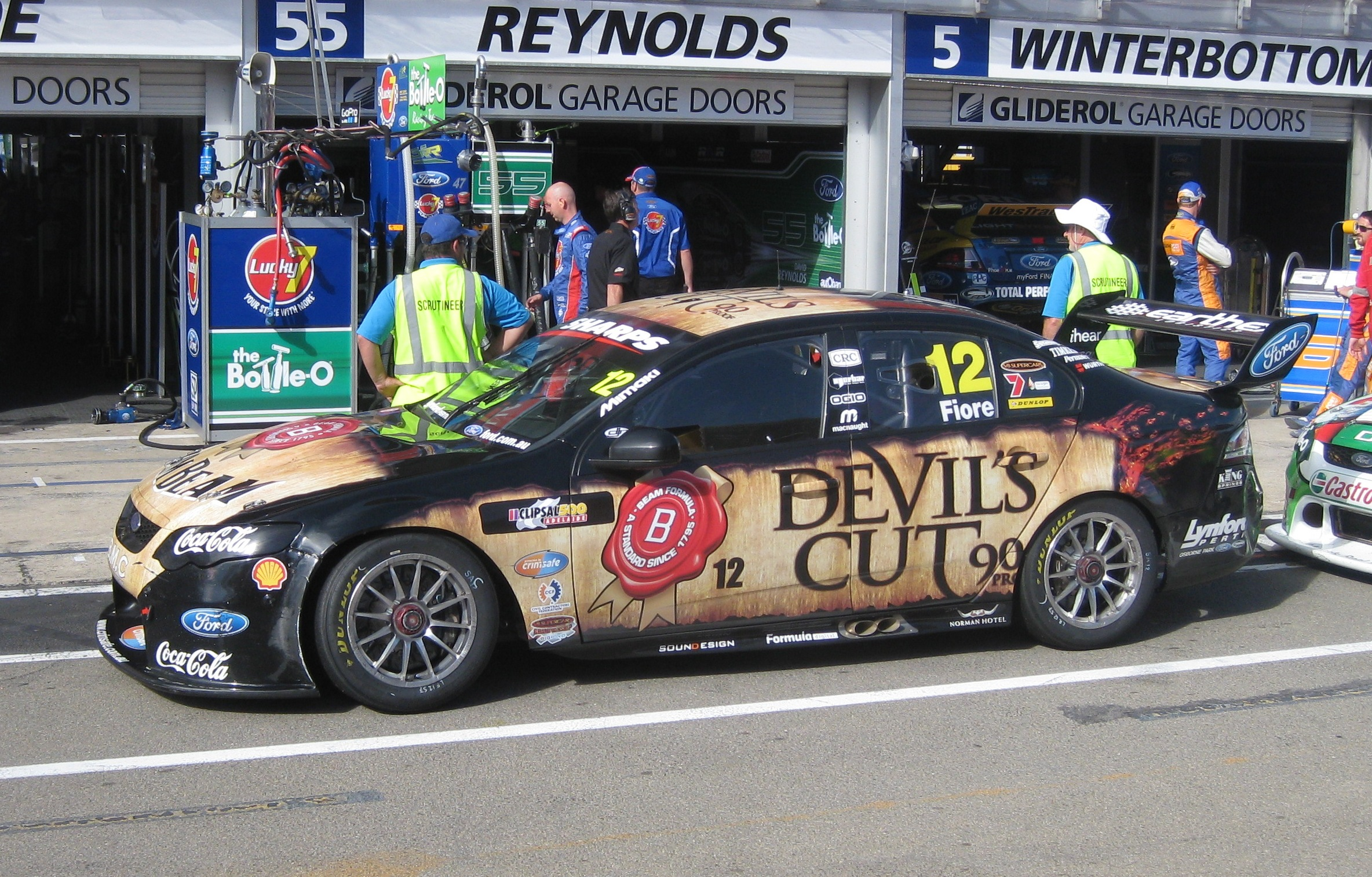
Ford FG Falcon of Dean Fiore at the 2012 Clipsal 500

=== Complete Bathurst 1000 results ===
Year	No.	Car	Drivers	Position	Laps
2009	12	Holden Commodore VE	(Australia) Dean Fiore (Australia) Troy Bayliss	DNF	59
2010	12	Ford Falcon FG	(Australia) Dean Fiore (Australia) Michael Patrizi	DNF	56
2011	12	Ford Falcon FG	(Australia) Dean Fiore (Australia) Michael Patrizi	20th	160
2012	12	Ford Falcon FG	(Australia) Dean Fiore (New Zealand) Matthew Halliday	22nd	147
