= 2011 Trading Post Perth Challenge =

2011 V8 Supercar championship race

(Western Australia) 2011 Trading Post Perth Challenge
Event Information
- Round 4 of 14 in the 2011 International V8 Supercars Championship
- Date: 29 April–1 May 2011
- Location: Perth, Western Australia
- Venue: Barbagallo Raceway
- Weather: Fine

Results
Race 1
Distance	50 laps	120 km
Pole position	Jamie Whincup; Triple Eight Race Engineering	56.0734
Winner	Jamie Whincup; Triple Eight Race Engineering	49:38.6955
Race 2
Distance	50 laps	120 km
Pole position	Jamie Whincup; Triple Eight Race Engineering	54.9898
Winner	Jason Bright; Brad Jones Racing	49:03.8794
Race 3
Distance	50 laps	120 km
Pole position	Jamie Whincup; Triple Eight Race Engineering	55.1464
Winner	Jamie Whincup; Triple Eight Race Engineering	49:04.0396

The 2011 Trading Post Perth Challenge was a motor race for the Australian sedan-based V8 Supercars racing cars. The Trading Post Perth Challenge was the fourth event of the 2011 International V8 Supercars Championship. It was the 34th time a motor racing event held at Barbagallo Raceway had contributed to the Australian Touring Car Championship and its successors. It was held on the weekend of April 29 to May 1 at Barbagallo Raceway, near Wanneroo, just outside Perth, Western Australia.

The event hosted races 7, 8 and 9 of the 2011 season in a unique to this event format. Each race was held of 50 laps of the 2.4 kilometre venue, making for race distances of 120 kilometres for each race. An alternative pointscore was used, giving 100 points for each race instead of the usual 150 points, meaning that the extra race would not make the Perth Challenge worth any more than the standard two race event. In keeping with the concept introduced in 2010 that each race is a standalone event, a different qualifying procedure was established. The usual Saturday Top Ten Shootout was abandoned and the grid for the two Sunday races was established by a single qualifying session with each driver's second fastest lap used to establish the grid for Sunday's Race 9.

The meeting was overshadowed by a heavy collision at the start of Race 8 which saw Steve Owen collide with the stalled Holden Commodore of Karl Reindler. The impact ruptured the fuel tank at the rear of Reindler's Brad Jones Racing Commodore, causing the car to erupt into a fireball. Reindler received only minor burns and Owen only minor injuries. It was doubly unfortunate for Reindler after he had finished seventh the previous race, a career best performance.

Jamie Whincup collected the most championship points for the weekend, 292 out of the possible 300, after winning races 7 and 9 and finished second in race 8. Jason Bright was next best performed with 260 points which included second in race 9, and victory in race 8. The race win was additionally notable as it was the first championship race win recorded by a Brad Jones Racing driver, recorded after joining V8 Supercar in 2000. Whincup's team mate Craig Lowndes was third for the weekend having collected 252 points over the three races, including a second in Race 7, making for a 1–2 finish in the race for the Triple Eight Race Engineering team. The best performed Ford driver of the weekend was Stone Brothers Racing lead driver, Shane van Gisbergen, who scored 196 points. The best individual performance by a Ford driver was by Will Davison of Ford Performance Racing with a third-place finish in Race 7, the only Ford podium result for the weekend.

== Results ==
Results as follows:

=== Qualifying Race 7 ===
Qualifying timesheet:

Pos	No	Name	Car	Team	Time
1	88	Jamie Whincup	Holden VE Commodore	Triple Eight Race Engineering	56.0734 s
2	6	Will Davison	Ford FG Falcon	Ford Performance Racing	56.2865 s
3	888	Craig Lowndes	Holden VE Commodore	Triple Eight Race Engineering	56.6132 s
4	17	Steven Johnson	Ford FG Falcon	Dick Johnson Racing	56.6990 s
5	15	Rick Kelly	Holden VE Commodore	Kelly Racing	56.7047 s
6	21	Karl Reindler	Holden VE Commodore	Britek Motorsport	56.7185 s
7	1	James Courtney	Holden VE Commodore	Holden Racing Team	56.7224 s
8	4	Alex Davison	Ford FG Falcon	Stone Brothers Racing	56.7279 s
9	18	James Moffat	Ford FG Falcon	Dick Johnson Racing	56.7406 s
10	8	Jason Bright	Holden VE Commodore	Brad Jones Racing	56.7691 s
11	33	Lee Holdsworth	Holden VE Commodore	Garry Rogers Motorsport	56.8444 s
12	5	Mark Winterbottom	Ford FG Falcon	Ford Performance Racing	56.8523 s
13	34	Michael Caruso	Holden VE Commodore	Garry Rogers Motorsport	56.8583 s
14	55	Paul Dumbrell	Ford FG Falcon	Rod Nash Racing	56.8831 s
15	16	David Reynolds	Holden VE Commodore	Kelly Racing	56.8844 s
16	9	Shane van Gisbergen	Ford FG Falcon	Stone Brothers Racing	56.9073 s
17	49	Steve Owen	Holden VE Commodore	Paul Morris Motorsport	56.9707 s
18	19	Jonathon Webb	Ford FG Falcon	Tekno Autosports	56.9774 s
19	47	Tim Slade	Ford FG Falcon	James Rosenberg Racing	56.9848 s
20	39	Russell Ingall	Holden VE Commodore	Paul Morris Motorsport	56.9979 s
21	14	Jason Bargwanna	Holden VE Commodore	Brad Jones Racing	57.0046 s
22	11	Greg Murphy	Holden VE Commodore	Kelly Racing	57.0363 s
23	2	Garth Tander	Holden VE Commodore	Holden Racing Team	57.0530 s
24	12	Dean Fiore	Ford FG Falcon	Triple F Racing	57.1402 s
25	7	Todd Kelly	Holden VE Commodore	Kelly Racing	57.1574 s
26	30	Warren Luff	Holden Commodore VE	Lucas Dumbrell Motorsport	57.1867 s
27	61	Fabian Coulthard	Holden VE Commodore	Walkinshaw Racing	57.2114 s
28	3	Tony D'Alberto	Ford FG Falcon	Tony D'Alberto Racing	57.5109 s

=== Race 7 ===
Race timesheets:

Pos	No	Name	Team	Laps	Time/Retired	Grid	Points
1	88	Jamie Whincup	Triple Eight Race Engineering	50	49 m 38.6955 s	1	100
2	888	Craig Lowndes	Triple Eight Race Engineering	50	+0.9 s	3	92
3	6	Will Davison	Ford Performance Racing	50	+6.7 s	6	86
4	9	Shane van Gisbergen	Stone Brothers Racing	50	+8.1 s	16	80
5	17	Steven Johnson	Dick Johnson Racing	50	+11.1 s	4	74
6	8	Jason Bright	Brad Jones Racing	50	+14.8 s	10	68
7	21	Karl Reindler	Britek Motorsport	50	+17.6 s	6	64
8	5	Mark Winterbottom	Ford Performance Racing	50	+21.1 s	12	60
9	15	Rick Kelly	Kelly Racing	50	+22.0 s	5	56
10	1	James Courtney	Holden Racing Team	50	+22.3 s	7	52
11	14	Jason Bargwanna	Brad Jones Racing	50	+30.7 s	25	48
12	34	Michael Caruso	Garry Rogers Motorsport	50	+32.4 s	13	46
13	2	Garth Tander	Holden Racing Team	50	+32.7 s	23	44
14	39	Russell Ingall	Paul Morris Motorsport	50	+33.1 s	20	42
15	11	Greg Murphy	Kelly Racing	50	+33.3 s	22	40
16	33	Lee Holdsworth	Garry Rogers Motorsport	50	+34.1 s	11	38
17	49	Steve Owen	Paul Morris Motorsport	50	+34.4 s	17	36
18	18	James Moffat	Dick Johnson Racing	50	+34.6 s	9	34
19	16	David Reynolds	Kelly Racing	50	+35.8 s	15	32
20	19	Jonathon Webb	Tekno Autosports	50	+36.5 s	18	30
21	4	Alex Davison	Stone Brothers Racing	50	+40.2 s	8	28
22	47	Tim Slade	James Rosenberg Racing	50	+40.4 s	19	26
23	61	Fabian Coulthard	Walkinshaw Racing	50	+40.9 s	27	24
24	12	Dean Fiore	Triple F Racing	50	+50.7 s	24	22
25	3	Tony D'Alberto	Tony D'Alberto Racing	50	+54.9 s	28	20
26	30	Warren Luff	Lucas Dumbrell Motorsport	49	+ 1 lap	26	18
27	7	Todd Kelly	Kelly Racing	49	+ 1 lap	25	16
Ret	55	Paul Dumbrell	Rod Nash Racing	40		14	

=== Qualifying Race 8 ===
Qualifying timesheet:

Pos	No	Name	Car	Team	Time
1	88	Jamie Whincup	Holden VE Commodore	Triple Eight Race Engineering	54.9898 s
2	8	Jason Bright	Holden VE Commodore	Brad Jones Racing	55.1614 s
3	888	Craig Lowndes	Holden VE Commodore	Triple Eight Race Engineering	55.3178 s
4	4	Alex Davison	Ford FG Falcon	Stone Brothers Racing	55.3445 s
5	2	Garth Tander	Holden VE Commodore	Holden Racing Team	55.3548 s
6	17	Steven Johnson	Ford FG Falcon	Dick Johnson Racing	55.3631 s
7	14	Jason Bargwanna	Holden VE Commodore	Brad Jones Racing	55.3666 s
8	6	Will Davison	Ford FG Falcon	Ford Performance Racing	55.4050 s
9	1	James Courtney	Holden VE Commodore	Holden Racing Team	55.4377 s
10	33	Lee Holdsworth	Holden VE Commodore	Garry Rogers Motorsport	55.4447 s
11	5	Mark Winterbottom	Ford FG Falcon	Ford Performance Racing	55.4461 s
12	18	James Moffat	Ford FG Falcon	Dick Johnson Racing	55.4604 s
13	21	Karl Reindler	Holden VE Commodore	Britek Motorsport	55.5029 s
14	15	Rick Kelly	Holden VE Commodore	Kelly Racing	55.5545 s
15	3	Tony D'Alberto	Ford FG Falcon	Tony D'Alberto Racing	55.5648 s
16	61	Fabian Coulthard	Holden VE Commodore	Walkinshaw Racing	55.5788 s
17	47	Tim Slade	Ford FG Falcon	James Rosenberg Racing	55.5830 s
18	11	Greg Murphy	Holden VE Commodore	Kelly Racing	55.5879 s
19	34	Michael Caruso	Holden VE Commodore	Garry Rogers Motorsport	55.6119 s
20	9	Shane van Gisbergen	Ford FG Falcon	Stone Brothers Racing	55.6239 s
21	55	Paul Dumbrell	Ford FG Falcon	Rod Nash Racing	55.6656 s
22	19	Jonathon Webb	Ford FG Falcon	Tekno Autosports	55.7658 s
23	12	Dean Fiore	Ford FG Falcon	Triple F Racing	55.8213 s
24	39	Russell Ingall	Holden VE Commodore	Paul Morris Motorsport	55.8815 s
25	49	Steve Owen	Holden VE Commodore	Paul Morris Motorsport	55.8929 s
26	16	David Reynolds	Holden VE Commodore	Kelly Racing	55.8995 s
27	7	Todd Kelly	Holden VE Commodore	Kelly Racing	55.9244 s
28	30	Warren Luff	Holden Commodore VE	Lucas Dumbrell Motorsport	55.9347 s

== Standings ==
- After 9 of 28 races.

Pos	No	Name	Team	Points
1	88	Jamie Whincup	Triple Eight Race Engineering	946
2	888	Craig Lowndes	Triple Eight Race Engineering	804
3	2	Garth Tander	Holden Racing Team	737
4	9	Shane van Gisbergen	Stone Brothers Racing	730
5	6	Will Davison	Ford Performance Racing	714
