= 2011 Sucrogen Townsville 400 =

2011 V8 Supercar championship race

(Queensland) 2011 Sucrogen Townsville 400
Event Information
- Round 7 of 14 in the 2011 International V8 Supercars Championship
- Date: 8–10 July 2011
- Location: Townsville, Queensland
- Venue: Townsville Street Circuit
- Weather: Fine

Results
Race 1
| Distance | 72 laps | 205 km |
| Pole position | Mark Winterbottom; Ford Performance Racing | 1:12.9424 |
| Winner | Garth Tander; Holden Racing Team | 1:31:22.6745 |
Race 2
| Distance | 72 laps | 205 km |
| Pole position | Craig Lowndes; Triple Eight Race Engineering | 1:12.8533 |
| Winner | Jamie Whincup; Triple Eight Race Engineering | 1:32:45.8802 |

The 2011 Sucrogen Townsville 400 was a motor race for the Australian sedan-based V8 Supercars racing cars. It was the seventh event of the 2011 International V8 Supercars Championship. It was held on the weekend of July 8 to 10 at the Townsville Street Circuit in Townsville, Queensland. It was the third running of the Townsville 400.

The event hosted races 14 and 15 of the 2011 season. A 72 lap, 200-kilometre race was held on both Saturday and Sunday. Qualifying for Race 14 consisted of a 20-minute, all-in session with the fastest ten progressing to the top ten shootout. Qualifying for Race 15 was a single 20 minute, all-in session.

Mark Winterbottom used the number 95 for this event in a promotion for the Pixar movie Cars 2, in which he starred. Winterbottom became the first driver to score four straight series poles since Mark Skaife in 1998 when he took pole for Race 14. The Holden Racing Team's Garth Tander won Race 14 from Jamie Whincup and Winterbottom's team mate Will Davison. Winterbottom finished fifth behind Craig Lowndes. There was controversy over Tander's win when he escaped a drive-through penalty despite hitting the bollard and appearing to cross the blend line at pit entry. Kelly Racing driver Greg Murphy was later penalized for a similar incident at the pit exit. Murphy's teammate David Reynolds led the race early on in an impressive drive but collided with James Courtney on his way into pit lane. The incident put Courtney out of the race and significantly damaged Reynolds car, leaving him 24th at race's end, ten laps off the lead.

Lowndes claimed pole position for Race 15 from Winterbottom and Reynolds. Lowndes led for most of the race before team mate Whincup, who had to queue behind Lowndes in his second pit stop, passed him in the closing stages. Winterbottom completed the podium. The two Stone Brothers Racing drivers, Alex Davison and Shane van Gisbergen, finished fourth and fifth respectively. Saturday winner Tander was in contention until a rear suspension failure dropped him several laps off the lead. Reynolds again had a disappointing race after a strong qualifying performance.

The weekend saw Whincup extend his championship lead over Lowndes from 156 to 186 points, the two Triple Eight drivers starting to pull away from third placed Van Gisbergen. Whincup scored 288 points to Lowndes' 258, while Winterbottom had the third highest total for the event with 240.

== Results ==
Results as follows:

=== Qualifying Race 14 ===
Qualifying timesheet:

| Pos | No | Name | Car | Team | Qualifying | Shootout |
|---|---|---|---|---|---|---|
| 1 | 95 | Mark Winterbottom | Ford FG Falcon | Ford Performance Racing | 1:13.0832 | 1:12.9424 |
| 2 | 88 | Jamie Whincup | Holden VE Commodore | Triple Eight Race Engineering | 1:12.9282 | 1:13.0667 |
| 3 | 6 | Will Davison | Ford FG Falcon | Ford Performance Racing | 1:13.1923 | 1:13.0764 |
| 4 | 888 | Craig Lowndes | Holden VE Commodore | Triple Eight Race Engineering | 1:13.1363 | 1:13.1731 |
| 5 | 2 | Garth Tander | Holden VE Commodore | Holden Racing Team | 1:13.0529 | 1:13.2245 |
| 6 | 33 | Lee Holdsworth | Holden VE Commodore | Garry Rogers Motorsport | 1:13.2717 | 1:13.2966 |
| 7 | 17 | Steven Johnson | Ford FG Falcon | Dick Johnson Racing | 1:13.1923 | 1:13.3250 |
| 8 | 16 | David Reynolds | Holden VE Commodore | Kelly Racing | 1:13.2031 | 1:13.3408 |
| 9 | 15 | Rick Kelly | Holden VE Commodore | Kelly Racing | 1:13.1045 | 1:13.4942 |
| 10 | 49 | Steve Owen | Holden VE Commodore | Paul Morris Motorsport | 1:13.2768 | 1:14.1755 |
| 11 | 61 | Fabian Coulthard | Holden VE Commodore | Walkinshaw Racing | 1:13.2894 | |
| 12 | 19 | Jonathon Webb | Ford FG Falcon | Tekno Autosports | 1:13.3499 | |
| 13 | 14 | Jason Bargwanna | Holden VE Commodore | Brad Jones Racing | 1:13.3515 | |
| 14 | 34 | Michael Caruso | Holden VE Commodore | Garry Rogers Motorsport | 1:13.3909 | |
| 15 | 55 | Paul Dumbrell | Ford FG Falcon | Rod Nash Racing | 1:13.4877 | |
| 16 | 18 | James Moffat | Ford FG Falcon | Dick Johnson Racing | 1:13.4892 | |
| 17 | 11 | Greg Murphy | Holden Commodore VE | Kelly Racing | 1:13.5025 | |
| 18 | 39 | Russell Ingall | Holden VE Commodore | Paul Morris Motorsport | 1:13.5053 | |
| 19 | 1 | James Courtney | Holden VE Commodore | Holden Racing Team | 1:13.5119 | |
| 20 | 47 | Tim Slade | Ford FG Falcon | James Rosenberg Racing | 1:13.5184 | |
| 21 | 8 | Jason Bright | Holden VE Commodore | Brad Jones Racing | 1:13.5220 | |
| 22 | 9 | Shane van Gisbergen | Ford FG Falcon | Stone Brothers Racing | 1:13.5295 | |
| 23 | 7 | Todd Kelly | Holden VE Commodore | Kelly Racing | 1:13.5611 | |
| 24 | 3 | Tony D'Alberto | Ford FG Falcon | Tony D'Alberto Racing | 1:13.6126 | |
| 25 | 12 | Dean Fiore | Ford FG Falcon | Triple F Racing | 1:13.7110 | |
| 26 | 4 | Alex Davison | Ford FG Falcon | Stone Brothers Racing | 1:13.7794 | |
| 27 | 30 | Warren Luff | Holden VE Commodore | Lucas Dumbrell Motorsport | 1:13.9782 | |
| 28 | 21 | Karl Reindler | Holden VE Commodore | Britek Motorsport | 1:14.1916 | |

=== Race 14 ===
Race timesheets:

| Pos | No | Name | Team | Laps | Time/Retired | Grid | Points |
|---|---|---|---|---|---|---|---|
| 1 | 2 | Garth Tander | Holden Racing Team | 72 | 1:31:22.6745 | 5 | 150 |
| 2 | 88 | Jamie Whincup | Triple Eight Race Engineering | 72 | +3.3s | 2 | 138 |
| 3 | 6 | Will Davison | Ford Performance Racing | 72 | +12.8s | 3 | 129 |
| 4 | 888 | Craig Lowndes | Triple Eight Race Engineering | 72 | +13.2s | 4 | 120 |
| 5 | 95 | Mark Winterbottom | Ford Performance Racing | 72 | +15.6s | 1 | 111 |
| 6 | 33 | Lee Holdsworth | Garry Rogers Motorsport | 72 | +17.6s | 6 | 102 |
| 7 | 15 | Rick Kelly | Kelly Racing | 72 | +23.8s | 9 | 96 |
| 8 | 49 | Steve Owen | Paul Morris Motorsport | 72 | +31.7s | 10 | 90 |
| 9 | 8 | Jason Bright | Brad Jones Racing | 72 | +35.3s | 21 | 84 |
| 10 | 39 | Russell Ingall | Paul Morris Motorsport | 72 | +35.8s | 18 | 78 |
| 11 | 9 | Shane van Gisbergen | Stone Brothers Racing | 72 | +39.6s | 22 | 72 |
| 12 | 55 | Paul Dumbrell | Rod Nash Racing | 72 | +41.6s | 15 | 69 |
| 13 | 17 | Steven Johnson | Dick Johnson Racing | 72 | +44.2s | 7 | 66 |
| 14 | 7 | Todd Kelly | Kelly Racing | 72 | +47.1s | 23 | 63 |
| 15 | 61 | Fabian Coulthard | Walkinshaw Racing | 72 | +49.7s | 11 | 60 |
| 16 | 34 | Michael Caruso | Garry Rogers Motorsport | 72 | +1m 2.1s | 14 | 57 |
| 17 | 18 | James Moffat | Dick Johnson Racing | 72 | +1m 3.2s | 16 | 54 |
| 18 | 3 | Tony D'Alberto | Tony D'Alberto Racing | 71 | + 1 lap | 24 | 51 |
| 19 | 11 | Greg Murphy | Kelly Racing | 71 | + 1 lap | 17 | 48 |
| 20 | 12 | Dean Fiore | Triple F Racing | 71 | + 1 lap | 25 | 45 |
| 21 | 19 | Jonathon Webb | Tekno Autosports | 71 | + 1 lap | 12 | 42 |
| 22 | 21 | Karl Reindler | Britek Motorsport | 70 | + 2 laps | 28 | 39 |
| 23 | 14 | Jason Bargwanna | Brad Jones Racing | 64 | + 8 laps | 13 | 36 |
| 24 | 16 | David Reynolds | Kelly Racing | 62 | + 10 laps | 8 | 33 |
| 25 | 47 | Tim Slade | James Rosenberg Racing | 58 | + 14 laps | 20 | 30 |
| 26 | 4 | Alex Davison | Stone Brothers Racing | 57 | + 15 laps | 26 | 27 |
| Ret | 30 | Warren Luff | Lucas Dumbrell Motorsport | 62 | | 27 | |
| Ret | 1 | James Courtney | Holden Racing Team | 30 | Accident | 19 | |

=== Qualifying Race 15 ===
Qualifying timesheet:

| Pos | No | Name | Car | Team | Time |
|---|---|---|---|---|---|
| 1 | 888 | Craig Lowndes | Holden VE Commodore | Triple Eight Race Engineering | 1:12.8533 |
| 2 | 95 | Mark Winterbottom | Ford FG Falcon | Ford Performance Racing | 1:13.1731 |
| 3 | 16 | David Reynolds | Holden VE Commodore | Kelly Racing | 1:13.2065 |
| 4 | 2 | Garth Tander | Holden VE Commodore | Holden Racing Team | 1:13.2192 |
| 5 | 6 | Will Davison | Ford FG Falcon | Ford Performance Racing | 1:13.2581 |
| 6 | 8 | Jason Bright | Holden VE Commodore | Brad Jones Racing | 1:13.2978 |
| 7 | 33 | Lee Holdsworth | Holden VE Commodore | Garry Rogers Motorsport | 1:13.3115 |
| 8 | 88 | Jamie Whincup | Holden VE Commodore | Triple Eight Race Engineering | 1:13.3530 |
| 9 | 15 | Rick Kelly | Holden VE Commodore | Kelly Racing | 1:13.4124 |
| 10 | 18 | James Moffat | Ford FG Falcon | Dick Johnson Racing | 1:13.4885 |
| 11 | 9 | Shane van Gisbergen | Ford FG Falcon | Stone Brothers Racing | 1:13.5452 |
| 12 | 1 | James Courtney | Holden VE Commodore | Holden Racing Team | 1:13.5459 |
| 13 | 14 | Jason Bargwanna | Holden VE Commodore | Brad Jones Racing | 1:13.5767 |
| 14 | 47 | Tim Slade | Ford FG Falcon | James Rosenberg Racing | 1:13.5816 |
| 15 | 39 | Russell Ingall | Holden VE Commodore | Paul Morris Motorsport | 1:13.6108 |
| 16 | 17 | Steven Johnson | Ford FG Falcon | Dick Johnson Racing | 1:13.6767 |
| 17 | 61 | Fabian Coulthard | Holden VE Commodore | Walkinshaw Racing | 1:13.6951 |
| 18 | 11 | Greg Murphy | Holden VE Commodore | Kelly Racing | 1:13.6952 |
| 19 | 49 | Steve Owen | Holden VE Commodore | Paul Morris Motorsport | 1:13.7193 |
| 20 | 7 | Todd Kelly | Holden VE Commodore | Kelly Racing | 1:13.7671 |
| 21 | 19 | Jonathon Webb | Ford FG Falcon | Tekno Autosports | 1:13.7960 |
| 22 | 4 | Alex Davison | Ford FG Falcon | Stone Brothers Racing | 1:13.8308 |
| 23 | 21 | Karl Reindler | Holden VE Commodore | Britek Motorsport | 1:13.8665 |
| 24 | 34 | Michael Caruso | Holden VE Commodore | Garry Rogers Motorsport | 1:13.8702 |
| 25 | 12 | Dean Fiore | Ford FG Falcon | Triple F Racing | 1:13.9722 |
| 26 | 30 | Warren Luff | Holden Commodore VE | Lucas Dumbrell Motorsport | 1:14.1653 |
| 27 | 3 | Tony D'Alberto | Ford FG Falcon | Tony D'Alberto Racing | 1:14.2244 |
| 28 | 55 | Paul Dumbrell | Ford FG Falcon | Rod Nash Racing | 1:20.7799 |

=== Race 15 ===
Race timesheets:

| Pos | No | Name | Team | Laps | Time/Retired | Grid | Points |
|---|---|---|---|---|---|---|---|
| 1 | 88 | Jamie Whincup | Triple Eight Race Engineering | 72 | 01:32:45.8802 | 8 | 150 |
| 2 | 888 | Craig Lowndes | Triple Eight Race Engineering | 72 | +4.4s | 1 | 138 |
| 3 | 95 | Mark Winterbottom | Ford Performance Racing | 72 | +11.2s | 2 | 129 |
| 4 | 4 | Alex Davison | Stone Brothers Racing | 72 | +13.9s | 22 | 120 |
| 5 | 9 | Shane van Gisbergen | Stone Brothers Racing | 72 | +19.9s | 11 | 111 |
| 6 | 33 | Lee Holdsworth | Garry Rogers Motorsport | 72 | +20.4s | 7 | 102 |
| 7 | 47 | Tim Slade | James Rosenberg Racing | 72 | +27.3s | 14 | 96 |
| 8 | 61 | Fabian Coulthard | Walkinshaw Racing | 72 | +29.4s | 17 | 90 |
| 9 | 39 | Russell Ingall | Paul Morris Motorsport | 72 | +30.1s | 15 | 84 |
| 10 | 55 | Paul Dumbrell | Rod Nash Racing | 72 | +32.3s | 28 | 78 |
| 11 | 14 | Jason Bargwanna | Brad Jones Racing | 72 | +32.8s | 13 | 72 |
| 12 | 17 | Steven Johnson | Dick Johnson Racing | 72 | +35.6s | 16 | 69 |
| 13 | 15 | Rick Kelly | Kelly Racing | 72 | +35.6s | 9 | 66 |
| 14 | 49 | Steve Owen | Paul Morris Motorsport | 72 | +36.0s | 19 | 63 |
| 15 | 18 | James Moffat | Dick Johnson Racing | 72 | +36.5s | 10 | 60 |
| 16 | 34 | Michael Caruso | Garry Rogers Motorsport | 72 | +42.3s | 24 | 57 |
| 17 | 7 | Todd Kelly | Kelly Racing | 72 | +43.3s | 20 | 54 |
| 18 | 6 | Will Davison | Ford Performance Racing | 72 | +44.9s | 5 | 51 |
| 19 | 1 | James Courtney | Holden Racing Team | 72 | +48.8s | 12 | 48 |
| 20 | 11 | Greg Murphy | Kelly Racing | 72 | +52.7s | 18 | 45 |
| 21 | 30 | Warren Luff | Lucas Dumbrell Motorsport | 72 | +55.6s | 26 | 42 |
| 22 | 8 | Jason Bright | Brad Jones Racing | 72 | +56.8s | 6 | 39 |
| 23 | 16 | David Reynolds | Kelly Racing | 72 | +1m 9.2s | 3 | 36 |
| 24 | 21 | Karl Reindler | Britek Motorsport | 68 | + 4 laps | 23 | 33 |
| 25 | 3 | Tony D'Alberto | Tony D'Alberto Racing | 67 | + 5 laps | 27 | 30 |
| 26 | 2 | Garth Tander | Holden Racing Team | 62 | + 10 laps | 4 | 27 |
| Ret | 12 | Dean Fiore | Triple F Racing | 39 | | 25 | |
| Ret | 19 | Jonathon Webb | Tekno Autosports | 1 | | 21 | |

== Standings ==
- After 15 of 28 races.

| Pos | No | Name | Team | Points |
|---|---|---|---|---|
| 1 | 88 | Jamie Whincup | Triple Eight Race Engineering | 1683 |
| 2 | 888 | Craig Lowndes | Triple Eight Race Engineering | 1497 |
| 3 | 9 | Shane van Gisbergen | Stone Brothers Racing | 1317 |
| 4 | 15 | Rick Kelly | Kelly Racing | 1244 |
| 5 | 5 | Mark Winterbottom | Ford Performance Racing | 1201 |
