= 2010 Sucrogen Townsville 400 =

2010 V8 supercar race

(Queensland) 2010 Sucrogen Townsville 400
Event Information
- Round 8 of 14 in the 2010 V8 Supercar Championship Series
- Date: 9–11 July 2010
- Location: Townsville, Queensland
- Venue: Townsville Street Circuit
- Weather: Fine

Results
Race 1
Distance	72 laps	205 km
Pole position	Jamie Whincup; Triple Eight Race Engineering	1:13.3223
Winner	Jamie Whincup; Triple Eight Race Engineering	1:31:16.3310
Race 2
Distance	71 laps	202 km
Pole position	Jamie Whincup; Triple Eight Race Engineering	1:12.7275
Winner	Mark Winterbottom; Ford Performance Racing	1:36:49.3580

The 2010 Sucrogen Townsville 400 was the eighth race meeting of the 2010 V8 Supercar Championship Series. It featured Races 15 and 16 of the series and was held on the weekend of 9–11 July at the Townsville Street Circuit, in Townsville, in Queensland, Australia. It was the second running of the Townsville 400 street race.

== Race 15 ==
Jamie Whincup secured pole position with a clean run in the top ten shootout, three-tenths faster than Mark Winterbottom and half a second ahead of Garth Tander. Jason Bright highlighted a resurgence for Brad Jones Racing to qualify fourth fastest. Teammate Jason Richards had been fastest in Friday practice but faded without explanation in qualifying. The two Dick Johnson Racing Falcons were next, James Courtney ahead of Steven Johnson. Craig Lowndes had qualified fastest, but a mistake in the Top Ten Shootout at the final corner saw Lowndes start tenth behind Fabian Coulthard, Lee Holdsworth and Shane van Gisbergen. Cameron McConville on his return to the V8 Supercar series, replacing Daniel Gaunt in the Lucas Dumbrell Motorsport Commodore, qualified twentieth while Jonathon Webb, debuting his new sponsor Mother Energy Drinks, qualified next-to last with Tony Ricciardello half a second behind the field.

Tony D'Alberto started from pit lane after breaking an axle during qualifying with unidentified further damage putting him into the pits after the warm-up lap. Winterbottom won the start to lead early with Craig Lowndes clouting the wall at the kink before turn 1, breaking his Watts linkage. Tander took the lead at the end of turn 1 with Whincup moving into second at turn 1 of the second lap. Jason Bright was taken by the two DJR Falcons with turn 1 seeing Courtney tap teammate Johnson into a spin. A queue quickly built up behind Bright, the BJR Commodore not able to lap as quickly as the three leaders.

Jason Bargwanna acquired a 'meatball' flag, calling him into the pits to get a dislodged and dragging rear bar removed from the car. Lap eight saw Whincup pinch the race lead from Tander into turn 1. Lap 11 saw Holdsworth take fourth from Bright. A lap later Courtney took Bright as well with Coulthard closing in. The race settled down and once pit stop cycles were completed

Whincup went on for a nine-second victory over Tander with Winterbottom ten seconds away in third. Holdsworth drove into fourth position, getting past James Courtney at the final pitstop. Russell Ingall climbed into sixth position, winning a dice with Jason Richards. Shane van Gisbergen, Steven Richards and Paul Dumbrell completed the top ten. Bright would eventually suffer an engine failure, ending his best run of the year. After his dramas Craig Lowndes finished 11 laps down in 26th position.

== Race 16 ==
Whincup wins the start from Tander, Lowndes and Courtney. There was contact early between Steven Johnson and Steven Richards, later on the opening lap there was contact between Rick Kelly and Tony D'Alberto which saw the pair lurch into the path of Russell Ingall. Ingall was out on the spot with a broken left rear and D'Alberto limped back to the pits to retire.

Steven Richards tagged Jason Richards into a spin, sending Lee Holdsworth and Steven Johnson across the infield in avoidance with Johnsons hitting Jason Richards stationery Commodore. Whincup pitted after eight laps with brake failure caused by a cut brake line. Winterbottom was first to pit on lap.

Lap 31 saw contact between Jason Bargwanna and Lee Holdsworth, sending Holdsworth into the tyre barrier. Holdsworth restarted. Not long after Lowndes fighting for second with Tander brushed a wall, bending a front suspension arm, damaging the cars steering. Lowndes immediately fell away from Tander and back towards Courtney. It took about five laps, but Courtney finally took Lowndes for third.

Tander speared off the track about ten laps at the same corner where track was starting to break up. Tander nosed into the barriers, recovered quickly and backed up across the path of Courtney and Lowndes. Courtney braked and Lowndes, unsighted, hit the back of Courtney's Falcon. Lowndes limped back to the pits to retire. Courtney continued with little damage.

Safety car was called when Dean Fiore got stuck in the tyre barriers and could not back out. Todd Kelly was spun around by Michael Caruso at the restart.

Winterbottom built up a lead over Courtney at the chequered flag with Tander third. Fourth for Paul Dumbrell and fifth for Steven Richards saw all three Ford Performance Racing prepared Falcons make the top five. Will Davison returned to the top six with Shane van Gisbergen getting the better of a long fight with Jonathon Webb. Jason Richards pinched eighth from Webb in the last few laps. Jason Bargwanna had his best result for the year and led the Kelly Racing quartet in tenth. Sixteenth for Cameron McConville on his V8 Supercar return was the best result for the year for Lucas Dumbrell Motorsport. Cruel luck again dogged Jason Bright with another engine failure, this time with five laps to go while sitting fifth.

== Results ==
Results as follows:

=== Qualifying Race 15 ===
Qualifying timesheets:

Pos	No	Name	Car	Team	Shootout	Qualifying
Pole	1	Jamie Whincup	Holden VE Commodore	Triple Eight Race Engineering	1:13.3223	1:13.0634
2	5	Mark Winterbottom	Ford FG Falcon	Ford Performance Racing	1:13.6361	1:13.2559
3	2	Garth Tander	Holden VE Commodore	Holden Racing Team	1:13.8638	1:13.5838
4	14	Jason Bright	Holden VE Commodore	Brad Jones Racing	1:13.8859	1:13.3126
5	18	James Courtney	Ford FG Falcon	Dick Johnson Racing	1:13.9123	1:13.3422
6	17	Steven Johnson	Ford FG Falcon	Dick Johnson Racing	1:13.9416	1:13.5924
7	24	Fabian Coulthard	Holden VE Commodore	Walkinshaw Racing	1:14.0071	1:13.6186
8	33	Lee Holdsworth	Holden VE Commodore	Garry Rogers Motorsport	1:14.0149	1:13.6042
9	9	Shane van Gisbergen	Ford FG Falcon	Stone Brothers Racing	1:14.5248	1:13.5284
10	888	Craig Lowndes	Holden VE Commodore	Triple Eight Race Engineering	1:14.6617	1:13.0511
11	6	Steven Richards	Ford FG Falcon	Ford Performance Racing		1:13.6230
12	7	Todd Kelly	Holden VE Commodore	Kelly Racing		1:13.6450
13	15	Rick Kelly	Holden VE Commodore	Kelly Racing		1:13.6708
14	22	Will Davison	Holden VE Commodore	Holden Racing Team		1:13.7111
15	11	Jason Bargwanna	Holden VE Commodore	Kelly Racing		1:13.7701
16	34	Michael Caruso	Holden VE Commodore	Garry Rogers Motorsport		1:13.8024
17	47	Tim Slade	Ford FG Falcon	James Rosenberg Racing		1:13.8851
18	10	Andrew Thompson	Holden VE Commodore	Walkinshaw Racing		1:14.0246
19	4	Alex Davison	Ford FG Falcon	Stone Brothers Racing		1:14.0263
20	30	Cameron McConville	Holden VE Commodore	Lucas Dumbrell Motorsport		1:14.1207
21	21	Karl Reindler	Holden VE Commodore	Britek Motorsport		1:14.1392
22	12	Dean Fiore	Ford FG Falcon	Triple F Racing		1:14.1621
23	51	Greg Murphy	Holden VE Commodore	Paul Morris Motorsport		1:14.2218
24	55	Paul Dumbrell	Ford FG Falcon	Rod Nash Racing		1:14.2494
25	8	Jason Richards	Holden VE Commodore	Brad Jones Racing		1:14.2771
26	3	Tony D'Alberto	Holden VE Commodore	Tony D'Alberto Racing		1:14.2850
27	39	Russell Ingall	Holden VE Commodore	Paul Morris Motorsport		1:14.4912
28	19	Jonathon Webb	Ford FG Falcon	Tekno Autosports		1:14.5145
29	16	Tony Ricciardello	Holden VE Commodore	Kelly Racing		1:15.1660
