= 2011 Coates Hire Ipswich 300 =

2011 V8 Supercar championship race

(Queensland) 2011 Coates Hire Ipswich 300
Event Information
- Round 8 of 14 in the 2011 International V8 Supercars Championship
- Date: 19–21 August 2011
- Location: Ipswich, Queensland
- Venue: Queensland Raceway
- Weather: Fine

Results
Race 1
Distance	22 laps	70 km
Pole position	Craig Lowndes; Triple Eight Race Engineering	1:09.8034
Winner	Craig Lowndes; Triple Eight Race Engineering	26:21.5763
Race 2
Distance	22 laps	70 km
Winner	Craig Lowndes; Triple Eight Race Engineering	28:44.5740
Race 3
Distance	65 laps	200 km
Pole position	Craig Lowndes; Triple Eight Race Engineering	1:09.5725
Winner	Craig Lowndes; Triple Eight Race Engineering	1:19:06.1660

The 2011 Coates Hire Ipswich 300 was a motor race for the Australian sedan-based V8 Supercars racing cars. It was the eighth event of the 2011 International V8 Supercars Championship. It was held on the weekend of August 19 to 21 at Queensland Raceway, near Ipswich, Queensland. It was the ninth running of the Queensland 300 and the 15th V8 Supercar event held at Queensland Raceway.

The event hosted races 16, 17 and 18 of the 2011 season in a unique three-race format. Two 22 lap, 70-kilometre races were run on Saturday split by a fifteen-minute 'service window', while Sunday saw a single 65-lap, 200-kilometre race. The pointscore was adjusted for the event, with 75 points going to the winner of each Saturday race before the normal pointscore was used on Sunday. The qualifying format for Races 16 and 18 remained the same as other events while the grid for Race 17 was based on the finishing results of Race 16.

Triple Eight Race Engineering driver Craig Lowndes dominated the event, taking both pole positions and winning all three races. Tim Slade had an impressive weekend for James Rosenberg Racing, finishing in the top three in each race and keeping pace with Lowndes and Lowndes' team mate Jamie Whincup. After finishing both Saturday races on the podium, Whincup's weekend took a turn for the worse when an engine trumpet cover was accidentally left on his car at the beginning of Race 18. Whincup was forced to vacate his front row grid spot and enter the pits to fix the issue. His race was made worse when he received a black flag for speeding in pitlane. Whincup fought back through the field to finish in 10th, setting a new lap record along the way.

Lowndes, Slade and Whincup were the standout performers of the weekend, with most others having mediocre results. The Holden Racing Team's Garth Tander experienced a flat tyre at the end of Race 16 after contact with Paul Dumbrell which dropped him to last place and meant he would start Race 17 from 28th position. Tander fought his way through the field only to be turned around by Jason Bargwanna, who was given a 25-point penalty for causing the incident. Ford Performance Racing had a very disappointing weekend, struggling to find pace on the soft tyres. Shane van Gisbergen took the final podium place on Sunday, albeit some thirty seconds off the lead. James Moffat scored his career best result, finishing fourth on Sunday, and David Reynolds scored his second top five finish of the season in the same race.

Lowndes scored the maximum of 300 points for the weekend while Slade scored 272 with his three podium finishes. Despite his Sunday problems, Whincup still managed to score the third highest points total for the weekend with 212. The weekend saw Whincup's championship lead over Lowndes decrease from 186 to 98.

== Results ==
Results as follows:

=== Qualifying Race 16 ===
Qualifying timesheet:

Pos	No	Name	Car	Team	Time
1	888	Craig Lowndes	Holden VE Commodore	Triple Eight Race Engineering	1:09.8034
2	47	Tim Slade	Ford FG Falcon	James Rosenberg Racing	1:09.8287
3	15	Rick Kelly	Holden VE Commodore	Kelly Racing	1:10.0666
4	88	Jamie Whincup	Holden VE Commodore	Triple Eight Race Engineering	1:10.1144
5	21	Karl Reindler	Holden VE Commodore	Britek Motorsport	1:10.1268
6	33	Lee Holdsworth	Holden VE Commodore	Garry Rogers Motorsport	1:10.1489
7	8	Jason Bright	Holden VE Commodore	Brad Jones Racing	1:10.1559
8	49	Steve Owen	Holden VE Commodore	Paul Morris Motorsport	1:10.1610
9	55	Paul Dumbrell	Ford FG Falcon	Rod Nash Racing	1:10.1611
10	16	David Reynolds	Holden VE Commodore	Kelly Racing	1:10.1749
11	19	Jonathon Webb	Ford FG Falcon	Tekno Autosports	1:10.2623
12	5	Mark Winterbottom	Ford FG Falcon	Ford Performance Racing	1:10.2660
13	17	Steven Johnson	Ford FG Falcon	Dick Johnson Racing	1:10.2696
14	6	Will Davison	Ford FG Falcon	Ford Performance Racing	1:10.2767
15	39	Russell Ingall	Holden VE Commodore	Paul Morris Motorsport	1:10.2817
16	9	Shane van Gisbergen	Ford FG Falcon	Stone Brothers Racing	1:10.2856
17	11	Greg Murphy	Holden VE Commodore	Kelly Racing	1:10.2999
18	4	Alex Davison	Ford FG Falcon	Stone Brothers Racing	1:10.3092
19	34	Michael Caruso	Holden VE Commodore	Garry Rogers Motorsport	1:10.4007
20	2	Garth Tander	Holden VE Commodore	Holden Racing Team	1:10.4082
21	1	James Courtney	Holden VE Commodore	Holden Racing Team	1:10.4263
22	18	James Moffat	Ford FG Falcon	Dick Johnson Racing	1:10.4534
23	61	Fabian Coulthard	Holden VE Commodore	Walkinshaw Racing	1:10.4672
24	7	Todd Kelly	Holden VE Commodore	Kelly Racing	1:10.5207
25	12	Dean Fiore	Ford FG Falcon	Triple F Racing	1:10.6151
26	14	Jason Bargwanna	Holden Commodore VE	Brad Jones Racing	1:10.7114
27	3	Tony D'Alberto	Ford FG Falcon	Tony D'Alberto Racing	1:10.7840
28	30	Warren Luff	Holden VE Commodore	Lucas Dumbrell Motorsport	1:11.0052

=== Race 16 ===
Race timesheets:

Pos	No	Name	Team	Laps	Time/Retired	Grid	Points
1	888	Craig Lowndes	Triple Eight Race Engineering	22	26:21.5763	1	75
2	47	Tim Slade	James Rosenberg Racing	22	+1.0s	2	69
3	88	Jamie Whincup	Triple Eight Race Engineering	22	+6.8s	4	65
4	15	Rick Kelly	Kelly Racing	22	+17.3s	3	60
5	49	Steve Owen	Paul Morris Motorsport	22	+21.9s	8	56
6	11	Greg Murphy	Kelly Racing	22	+24.2s	17	51
7	33	Lee Holdsworth	Garry Rogers Motorsport	22	+26.4s	6	48
8	17	Steven Johnson	Dick Johnson Racing	22	+26.4s	13	45
9	21	Karl Reindler	Britek Motorsport	22	+27.8s	5	42
10	18	James Moffat	Dick Johnson Racing	22	+28.7s	22	39
11	9	Shane van Gisbergen	Stone Brothers Racing	22	+30.4s	16	36
12	4	Alex Davison	Stone Brothers Racing	22	+31.1s	18	35
13	5	Mark Winterbottom	Ford Performance Racing	22	+31.9s	12	33
14	55	Paul Dumbrell	Rod Nash Racing	22	+31.9s	9	32
15	6	Will Davison	Ford Performance Racing	22	+33.0s	14	30
16	39	Russell Ingall	Paul Morris Motorsport	22	+33.5s	15	29
17	7	Todd Kelly	Kelly Racing	22	+34.3s	24	27
18	16	David Reynolds	Kelly Racing	22	+35.2s	10	26
19	34	Michael Caruso	Garry Rogers Motorsport	22	+36.9s	19	24
20	1	James Courtney	Holden Racing Team	22	+38.1s	21	23
21	8	Jason Bright	Brad Jones Racing	22	+38.3s	7	21
22	14	Jason Bargwanna	Brad Jones Racing	22	+38.5s	26	20
23	12	Dean Fiore	Triple F Racing	22	+38.9s	25	18
24	61	Fabian Coulthard	Walkinshaw Racing	22	+40.1s	23	17
25	3	Tony D'Alberto	Tony D'Alberto Racing	22	+42.8s	27	15
26	19	Jonathon Webb	Tekno Autosports	22	+49.3s	11	14
27	30	Warren Luff	Lucas Dumbrell Motorsport	22	+58.7s	28	12
28	2	Garth Tander	Holden Racing Team	22	+1m 23.5s	20	11

=== Race 17 ===
Race timesheets:

Pos	No	Name	Team	Laps	Time/Retired	Grid	Points
1	888	Craig Lowndes	Triple Eight Race Engineering	22	28:44.5740	1	75
2	88	Jamie Whincup	Triple Eight Race Engineering	22	+1.4s	3	69
3	47	Tim Slade	James Rosenberg Racing	22	+2.6s	2	65
4	15	Rick Kelly	Kelly Racing	22	+9.8s	4	60
5	49	Steve Owen	Paul Morris Motorsport	22	+14.2s	5	56
6	17	Steven Johnson	Dick Johnson Racing	22	+15.2s	8	51
7	11	Greg Murphy	Kelly Racing	22	+16.2s	6	48
8	9	Shane van Gisbergen	Stone Brothers Racing	22	+18.9s	11	45
9	18	James Moffat	Dick Johnson Racing	22	+19.4s	10	42
10	5	Mark Winterbottom	Ford Performance Racing	22	+23.3s	13	39
11	33	Lee Holdsworth	Garry Rogers Motorsport	22	+23.5s	7	36
12	39	Russell Ingall	Paul Morris Motorsport	22	+23.8s	6	35
13	14	Jason Bargwanna	Brad Jones Racing	22	+25.6s	22	33
14	8	Jason Bright	Brad Jones Racing	22	+25.7s	21	32
15	6	Will Davison	Ford Performance Racing	22	+26.4s	15	30
16	21	Karl Reindler	Britek Motorsport	22	+28.3s	9	29
17	3	Tony D'Alberto	Tony D'Alberto Racing	22	+29.9s	25	27
18	61	Fabian Coulthard	Walkinshaw Racing	22	+30.2s	24	26
19	34	Michael Caruso	Garry Rogers Motorsport	22	+32.0s	19	24
20	19	Jonathon Webb	Tekno Autosports	22	+35.0s	26	23
21	12	Dean Fiore	Triple F Racing	22	+35.2s	23	21
22	4	Alex Davison	Stone Brothers Racing	22	+41.2s	12	20
23	2	Garth Tander	Holden Racing Team	22	+41.8s	28	18
24	30	Warren Luff	Lucas Dumbrell Motorsport	22	+46.1s	27	17
25	55	Paul Dumbrell	Rod Nash Racing	21	+ 1 lap	14	15
26	16	David Reynolds	Kelly Racing	18	+ 4 laps	18	14
Ret	7	Todd Kelly	Kelly Racing	1	Accident	17	
Ret	1	James Courtney	Holden Racing Team	1	Accident	20	

=== Qualifying Race 18 ===
Qualifying timesheet:

Pos	No	Name	Car	Team	Time
1	888	Craig Lowndes	Holden VE Commodore	Triple Eight Race Engineering	1:09.5725
2	88	Jamie Whincup	Holden VE Commodore	Triple Eight Race Engineering	1:09.7248
3	47	Tim Slade	Ford FG Falcon	James Rosenberg Racing	1:09.7612
4	8	Jason Bright	Holden VE Commodore	Brad Jones Racing	1:09.8593
5	9	Shane van Gisbergen	Ford FG Falcon	Stone Brothers Racing	1:09.8689
6	16	David Reynolds	Holden VE Commodore	Kelly Racing	1:09.9302
7	17	Steven Johnson	Ford FG Falcon	Dick Johnson Racing	1:09.9486
8	61	Fabian Coulthard	Holden VE Commodore	Walkinshaw Racing	1:10.0030
9	39	Russell Ingall	Holden VE Commodore	Paul Morris Motorsport	1:10.0108
10	6	Will Davison	Ford FG Falcon	Ford Performance Racing	1:10.0328
11	18	James Moffat	Ford FG Falcon	Dick Johnson Racing	1:10.0732
12	15	Rick Kelly	Holden VE Commodore	Kelly Racing	1:10.1047
13	19	Jonathon Webb	Ford FG Falcon	Tekno Autosports	1:10.1287
14	49	Steve Owen	Holden VE Commodore	Paul Morris Motorsport	1:10.1638
15	34	Michael Caruso	Holden VE Commodore	Garry Rogers Motorsport	1:10.1831
16	4	Alex Davison	Ford FG Falcon	Stone Brothers Racing	1:10.1894
17	14	Jason Bargwanna	Holden VE Commodore	Brad Jones Racing	1:10.2325
18	12	Dean Fiore	Ford FG Falcon	Triple F Racing	1:10.2648
19	2	Garth Tander	Holden VE Commodore	Holden Racing Team	1:10.2726
20	5	Mark Winterbottom	Ford FG Falcon	Ford Performance Racing	1:10.2986
21	11	Greg Murphy	Holden VE Commodore	Kelly Racing	1:10.3013
22	1	James Courtney	Holden VE Commodore	Holden Racing Team	1:10.3481
23	3	Tony D'Alberto	Ford FG Falcon	Tony D'Alberto Racing	1:10.3520
24	33	Lee Holdsworth	Holden VE Commodore	Garry Rogers Motorsport	1:10.3552
25	55	Paul Dumbrell	Ford FG Falcon	Ford Performance Racing	1:10.4006
26	21	Karl Reindler	Holden Commodore VE	Britek Motorsport	1:10.4099
27	7	Todd Kelly	Holden VE Commodore	Kelly Racing	1:10.4197
28	30	Warren Luff	Holden VE Commodore	Lucas Dumbrell Motorsport	1:10.4985

=== Race 18 ===
Race timesheets:

Pos	No	Name	Team	Laps	Time/Retired	Grid	Points
1	888	Craig Lowndes	Triple Eight Race Engineering	65	1:19:06.1660	1	150
2	47	Tim Slade	James Rosenberg Racing	65	+1.0s	3	138
3	9	Shane van Gisbergen	Stone Brothers Racing	65	+33.9s	5	129
4	18	James Moffat	Dick Johnson Racing	65	+35.4s	11	120
5	16	David Reynolds	Kelly Racing	65	+42.7s	6	111
6	2	Garth Tander	Holden Racing Team	65	+46.4s	19	102
7	61	Fabian Coulthard	Walkinshaw Racing	65	+46.9s	8	96
8	4	Alex Davison	Stone Brothers Racing	65	+48.0s	16	90
9	17	Steven Johnson	Dick Johnson Racing	65	+51.4s	7	84
10	88	Jamie Whincup	Triple Eight Race Engineering	65	+56.6s	2	78
11	39	Russell Ingall	Paul Morris Motorsport	65	+57.5s	9	72
12	1	James Courtney	Holden Racing Team	65	+57.6s	22	69
13	11	Greg Murphy	Kelly Racing	65	+59.7s	21	66
14	34	Michael Caruso	Garry Rogers Motorsport	65	+59.8s	15	63
15	7	Todd Kelly	Kelly Racing	65	+1m 0.0s	27	60
16	21	Karl Reindler	Britek Motorsport	65	+1m 3.8s	26	57
17	15	Rick Kelly	Kelly Racing	65	+1m 7.3s	12	54
18	33	Lee Holdsworth	Garry Rogers Motorsport	65	+1m 8.6s	24	51
19	5	Mark Winterbottom	Ford Performance Racing	65	+1m 12.1s	20	48
20	3	Tony D'Alberto	Tony D'Alberto Racing	65	+1m 12.8s	23	45
21	6	Will Davison	Ford Performance Racing	64	+ 1 lap	10	42
22	19	Jonathon Webb	Tekno Autosports	64	+ 1 lap	13	39
23	30	Warren Luff	Lucas Dumbrell Motorsport	64	+ 1 lap	28	36
24	55	Paul Dumbrell	Rod Nash Racing	64	+ 1 lap	25	33
25	12	Dean Fiore	Triple F Racing	64	+ 1 lap	18	30
26	14	Jason Bargwanna	Brad Jones Racing	64	+ 1 lap	17	27
27	49	Steve Owen	Paul Morris Motorsport	63	+ 2 laps	14	24
28	8	Jason Bright	Brad Jones Racing	53	+ 12 laps	4	21

== Standings ==
- After 18 of 28 races.

Pos	No	Name	Team	Points
1	88	Jamie Whincup	Triple Eight Race Engineering	1895
2	888	Craig Lowndes	Triple Eight Race Engineering	1797
3	9	Shane van Gisbergen	Stone Brothers Racing	1502
4	15	Rick Kelly	Kelly Racing	1418
5	17	Steven Johnson	Dick Johnson Racing	1345
