= 2011 Armor All Gold Coast 600 =

2011 V8 Supercar championship race

Coordinates: 27°59′23″S 153°25′40″E

(Queensland) 2011 Armor All Gold Coast 600
Event Information
- Round 11 of 14 in the 2011 International V8 Supercars Championship
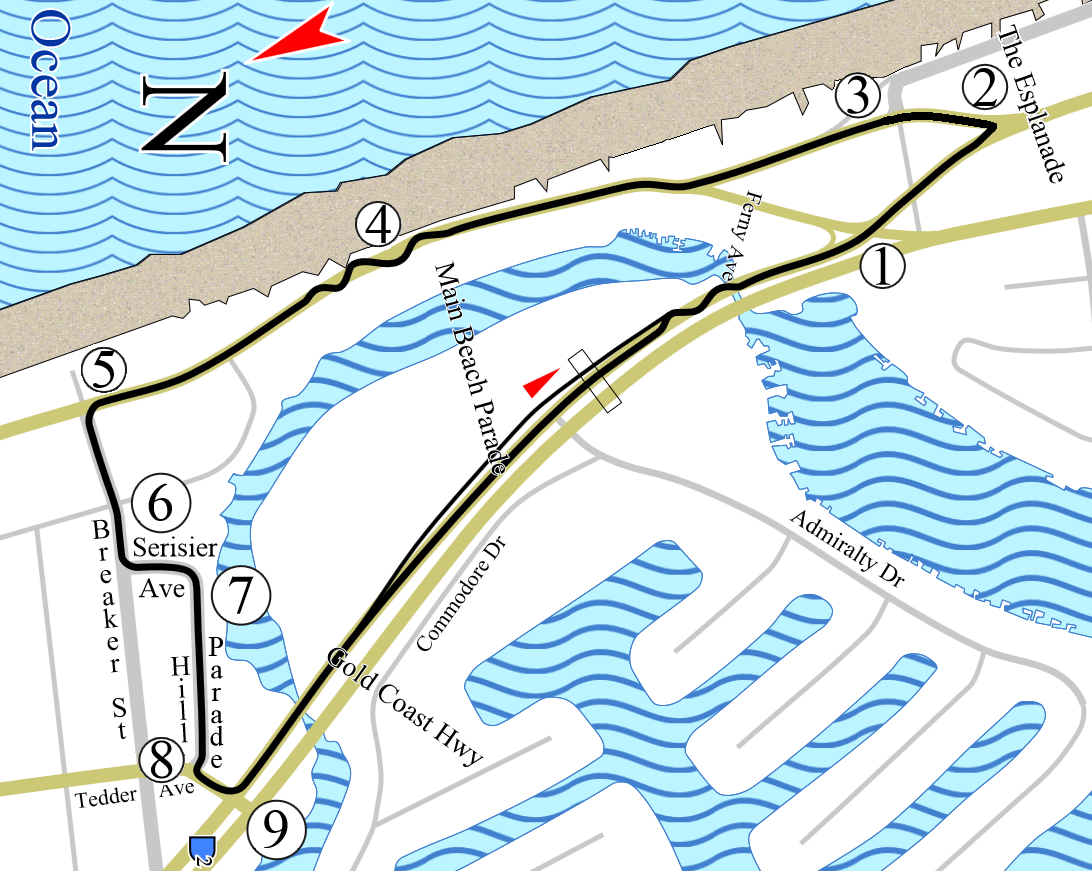
- Date: 21–23 October 2011
- Location: Surfers Paradise, Queensland
- Venue: Surfers Paradise Street Circuit
- Weather: Fine

Results
Race 1
Distance	102 laps	300 km
Pole position	Jamie Whincup; Triple Eight Race Engineering	1:11.7184
Winner	Jamie Whincup; Sébastien Bourdais; Triple Eight Race Engineering	2:13:21.5515
Race 2
Distance	102 laps	300 km
Pole position	Jamie Whincup; Triple Eight Race Engineering	1:10.9615
Winner	Mark Winterbottom; Richard Lyons; Ford Performance Racing	2:14:08.1572

The 2011 Armor All Gold Coast 600 was a motor race for the Australian sedan-based V8 Supercars racing cars. It was the eleventh event of the 2011 International V8 Supercars Championship. It was held on the weekend of 21 to 23 October at the Surfers Paradise Street Circuit in Surfers Paradise, Queensland. It was the tenth V8 Supercar championship event held at the circuit, the second running of the Gold Coast 600, and the eighteenth annual overall Australian Touring Car event at the circuit (including seven non-championship ATCC/V8 Supercar rounds and two non-championship Super Touring rounds), and the twenty-first race meet overall at the street circuit, dating back to the 1991 CART race.

The event hosted races 21 and 22 of the 2011 season. As in 2010, a single 102 lap, 300-kilometre race was held on Saturday and Sunday. Qualifying for Race 21 consisted of a 20-minute, all-in session with the fastest ten progressing to the top ten shootout. Qualifying for Race 22 was a single 20 minute, all-in session. Each team was required to employ a driver with an 'international reputation' for the event, with one driver needing to complete a minimum of 34 laps in each race.

Many international drivers came from the IndyCar Series, Formula One and Sports Car racing. A restriction was put in place preventing international drivers who competed in the L&H 500 and the Bathurst 1000 from taking part. However, in light of the Las Vegas crash that killed Holden Racing Team international driver Dan Wheldon a week prior to the event, this restriction was lifted to accommodate drivers who could not participate due to the accident, as Will Power (Ford Performance Racing, injured in the Lap 11 crash) and Tony Kanaan (Brad Jones Racing, was leading when race abandoned) also withdrew. Darren Turner (Wheldon), Richard Lyons (Power), and Allan Simonsen (Kanaan) were named replacements. The International Drivers Trophy was renamed in Wheldon's honor. The winner of this was French Indycar and Sportscar driver Sébastien Bourdais.

As with Bathurst, Fox Sports brought commentators Mike Joy (Statesville, North Carolina) and Darrell Waltrip (Franklin, Tennessee to Surfers Paradise for live coverage overseas.

== Entry list ==
No.	Drivers	Team (Sponsor)	Car	No.	Drivers	Team (Sponsor)	Car
1	(Australia) James Courtney (United Kingdom) Darren Turner	Holden Racing Team (Toll, Rockstar Energy)	Holden Commodore VE	17	(Australia) Steven Johnson (Germany) Dirk Muller	Dick Johnson Racing (Jim Beam, Coca-Cola)	Ford FG Falcon
2	(Australia) Garth Tander (Australia) Ryan Briscoe	Holden Racing Team (Toll, Rockstar Energy)	Holden Commodore VE	18	(Australia) James Moffat (United States) Joey Hand	Dick Johnson Racing (Jim Beam, Coca-Cola)	Ford FG Falcon
3	(Australia) Tony D'Alberto (Italy) Vitantonio Liuzzi	Tony D'Alberto Racing (Wilson Security)	Ford FG Falcon	19	(Australia) Jonathon Webb (Brazil) Gil de Ferran	Tekno Autosports (Mother Energy, Tekno Performance)	Ford FG Falcon
4	(Australia) Alex Davison (Germany) Marc Lieb	Stone Brothers Racing (Irwin Industrial Tools)	Ford FG Falcon	21	(Australia) Karl Reindler (Italy) Fabrizio Giovanardi	Britek Motorsport (Fair Dinkum Sheds, Wilson Security)	Holden Commodore VE
5	(Australia) Mark Winterbottom (United Kingdom) Richard Lyons	Ford Performance Racing (Orrcon Steel, Dunlop Tires)	Ford FG Falcon	30	(Australia) Warren Luff (United Kingdom) Marino Franchitti	Lucas Dumbrell Motorsport (Gulf Western Oils)	Holden Commodore VE
6	(Australia) Will Davison (Finland) Mika Salo	Ford Performance Racing (Trading Post, Castrol)	Ford FG Falcon	33	(Australia) Lee Holdsworth (France) Simon Pagenaud	Garry Rogers Motorsport (Fujitsu, Valvoline)	Holden Commodore VE
7	(Australia) Todd Kelly (United Kingdom) Richard Westbrook	Kelly Racing (Jack Daniels)	Holden Commodore VE	34	(Australia) Michael Caruso (Brazil) Augusto Farfus	Garry Rogers Motorsport (Fujitsu, Valvoline)	Holden Commodore VE
8	(Australia) Jason Bright (France) Stephane Sarrazin	Brad Jones Racing (BOC)	Holden Commodore VE	39	(Australia) Russell Ingall (Denmark) Jan Magnussen	Paul Morris Motorsport (Supercheap Auto, Castrol)	Holden Commodore VE
9	(New Zealand) Shane van Gisbergen (Italy) Emanuele Pirro	Stone Brothers Racing (SP Tools)	Ford FG Falcon	47	(Australia) Tim Slade (Brazil) Helio Castroneves	James Rosenberg Racing (Lucky 7 Convenience Stores)	Ford FG Falcon
11	(New Zealand) Greg Murphy (United Kingdom) Oliver Gavin	Kelly Racing (Pepsi Max)	Holden Commodore VE	49	(Australia) Steve Owen (United States) Boris Said	Paul Morris Motorsport (V.I.P Petfoods)	Holden Commodore VE
12	(Australia) Dean Fiore (Italy) Gianni Morbidelli	Triple F Racing (WesTrac)	Ford FG Falcon	55	(Australia) Paul Dumbrell (Austria) Christian Klien	Rod Nash Racing (The Bottle-O)	Ford FG Falcon
14	(Australia) Jason Bargwanna (Denmark) Allan Simonsen	Brad Jones Racing (Jana Living)	Holden Commodore VE	61	(New Zealand) Fabian Coulthard (United States) Patrick Long	Walkinshaw Racing (Bundaberg Rum)	Holden Commodore VE
15	(Australia) Rick Kelly (Germany) Jorg Bergmeister	Kelly Racing (Jack Daniels)	Holden Commodore VE	88	(Australia) Jamie Whincup (France) Sebastien Bourdais	Triple Eight Race Engineering (Vodafone)	Holden Commodore VE
16	(Australia) David Reynolds (Canada) Alex Tagliani	Kelly Racing (Stratco)	Holden Commodore VE	888	(Australia) Craig Lowndes (United Kingdom) Andy Priaulx	Triple Eight Race Engineering (Vodafone)	Holden Commodore VE

== Results ==
=== Race 21 ===
Pos	No	Driver	Team	Laps	Time/Retired	Grid	Points
1	88	(Australia) Jamie Whincup (France) Sébastien Bourdais	Triple Eight Race Engineering	102	2:13:21.5515	1	150
2	6	(Australia) Will Davison (Finland) Mika Salo	Ford Performance Racing	102	+2.2s	3	138
3	5	(Australia) Mark Winterbottom (United Kingdom) Richard Lyons	Ford Performance Racing	102	+2.5s	17	129
4	18	(Australia) James Moffat (United States) Joey Hand	Dick Johnson Racing	102	+2.8s	6	120
5	61	(New Zealand) Fabian Coulthard (United States) Patrick Long	Walkinshaw Racing	102	+5.8s	11	111
6	11	(New Zealand) Greg Murphy (United Kingdom) Oliver Gavin	Kelly Racing	102	+7.1s	18	102
7	15	(Australia) Rick Kelly (Germany) Jörg Bergmeister	Kelly Racing	102	+12.4s	8	96
8	34	(Australia) Michael Caruso (Brazil) Augusto Farfus	Garry Rogers Motorsport	102	+13.6s	14	90
9	19	(Australia) Jonathon Webb (Brazil) Gil de Ferran	Tekno Autosports	102	+15.0s	16	84
10	33	(Australia) Lee Holdsworth (France) Simon Pagenaud	Garry Rogers Motorsport	102	+16.8s	7	78
11	2	(Australia) Garth Tander (Australia) Ryan Briscoe	Holden Racing Team	102	+16.8s	2	72
12	47	(Australia) Tim Slade (Brazil) Hélio Castroneves	James Rosenberg Racing	102	+17.1s	24	69
13	7	(Australia) Todd Kelly (United Kingdom) Richard Westbrook	Kelly Racing	102	+17.4s	22	66
14	1	(Australia) James Courtney (United Kingdom) Darren Turner	Holden Racing Team	102	+20.7s	10	63
15	55	(Australia) Paul Dumbrell (Austria) Christian Klien	Ford Performance Racing	102	+22.1s	23	60
16	9	(New Zealand) Shane van Gisbergen (Italy) Emanuele Pirro	Stone Brothers Racing	102	+23.9s	9	57
17	14	(Australia) Jason Bargwanna (Denmark) Allan Simonsen	Brad Jones Racing	102	+25.9s	26	54
18	49	(Australia) Steve Owen (United States) Boris Said	Paul Morris Motorsport	102	+28.9s	4	51
19	16	(Australia) David Reynolds (Canada) Alex Tagliani	Kelly Racing	100	+ 2 laps	12	48
20	12	(Australia) Dean Fiore (Italy) Gianni Morbidelli	Triple F Racing	100	+ 2 laps	27	45
21	8	(Australia) Jason Bright (France) Stéphane Sarrazin	Brad Jones Racing	99	+ 3 laps	28	42
22	39	(Australia) Russell Ingall (Denmark) Jan Magnussen	Paul Morris Motorsport	97	+ 5 laps	13	39
23	4	(Australia) Alex Davison (Germany) Marc Lieb	Stone Brothers Racing	78	+ 24 laps	5	36
Ret	3	(Australia) Tony D'Alberto (Italy) Vitantonio Liuzzi	Tony D'Alberto Racing	75		25	
Ret	888	(Australia) Craig Lowndes (United Kingdom) Andy Priaulx	Triple Eight Race Engineering	52		15	
Ret	17	(Australia) Steven Johnson (Germany) Dirk Müller	Dick Johnson Racing	24		20	
Ret	30	(Australia) Warren Luff (United Kingdom) Marino Franchitti	Lucas Dumbrell Motorsport	14		19	
Ret	21	(Australia) Karl Reindler (Italy) Fabrizio Giovanardi	Britek Motorsport	13		21	

=== Race 22 ===
Pos	No	Driver	Team	Laps	Time/Retired	Grid	Points
1	5	(Australia) Mark Winterbottom (United Kingdom) Richard Lyons	Ford Performance Racing	102	2:13:21.5515	3	150
2	88	(Australia) Jamie Whincup (France) Sébastien Bourdais	Triple Eight Race Engineering	102	+1.6s	1	138
3	33	(Australia) Lee Holdsworth (France) Simon Pagenaud	Garry Rogers Motorsport	102	+3.1s	8	129
4	11	(New Zealand) Greg Murphy (United Kingdom) Oliver Gavin	Kelly Racing	102	+8.7s	7	120
5	15	(Australia) Rick Kelly (Germany) Jörg Bergmeister	Kelly Racing	102	+11.3s	14	111
6	1	(Australia) James Courtney (United Kingdom) Darren Turner	Holden Racing Team	102	+12.0s	23	102
7	49	(Australia) Steve Owen (United States) Boris Said	Paul Morris Motorsport	102	+13.5s	6	96
8	39	(Australia) Russell Ingall (Denmark) Jan Magnussen	Paul Morris Motorsport	102	+14.9s	16	90
9	7	(Australia) Todd Kelly (United Kingdom) Richard Westbrook	Kelly Racing	102	+15.3s	17	84
10	47	(Australia) Tim Slade (Brazil) Hélio Castroneves	James Rosenberg Racing	102	+15.6s	22	78
11	16	(Australia) David Reynolds (Canada) Alex Tagliani	Kelly Racing	102	+17.1s	10	72
12	17	(Australia) Steven Johnson (Germany) Dirk Müller	Dick Johnson Racing	102	+17.6s	21	69
13	19	(Australia) Jonathon Webb (Brazil) Gil de Ferran	Tekno Autosports	102	+17.7s	19	66
14	6	(Australia) Will Davison (Finland) Mika Salo	Ford Performance Racing	102	+19.7s	4	63
15	61	(New Zealand) Fabian Coulthard (United States) Patrick Long	Walkinshaw Racing	102	+21.8s	15	60
16	9	(New Zealand) Shane van Gisbergen (Italy) Emanuele Pirro	Stone Brothers Racing	102	+27.1s	18	57
17	14	(Australia) Jason Bargwanna (Denmark) Allan Simonsen	Brad Jones Racing	102	+39.0s	24	54
18	4	(Australia) Alex Davison (Germany) Marc Lieb	Stone Brothers Racing	102	+43.4s	12	51
19	3	(Australia) Tony D'Alberto (Italy) Vitantonio Liuzzi	Tony D'Alberto Racing	102	+44.0s	20	48
20	888	(Australia) Craig Lowndes (United Kingdom) Andy Priaulx	Triple Eight Race Engineering	102	+53.1s	5	45
21	34	(Australia) Michael Caruso (Brazil) Augusto Farfus	Garry Rogers Motorsport	99	+ 3 laps	11	42
22	21	(Australia) Karl Reindler (Italy) Fabrizio Giovanardi	Britek Motorsport	98	+ 4 laps	28	39
23	2	(Australia) Garth Tander (Australia) Ryan Briscoe	Holden Racing Team	82	+ 20 laps	2	36
Ret	18	(Australia) James Moffat (United States) Joey Hand	Dick Johnson Racing	77		9	
Ret	12	(Australia) Dean Fiore (Italy) Gianni Morbidelli	Triple F Racing	51		26	
Ret	8	(Australia) Jason Bright (France) Stéphane Sarrazin	Brad Jones Racing	51		25	
Ret	30	(Australia) Warren Luff (United Kingdom) Marino Franchitti	Lucas Dumbrell Motorsport	15		27	
Ret	55	(Australia) Paul Dumbrell (Austria) Christian Klien	Ford Performance Racing	0		13	

== Dan Wheldon Trophy Points ==
Pos	No	Name	Team	Points
1	88	(France) Sébastien Bourdais	Triple Eight Race Engineering	288
2	5	(United Kingdom) Richard Lyons	Ford Performance Racing	279
3	11	(United Kingdom) Oliver Gavin	Kelly Racing	222
4	33	(France) Simon Pagenaud	Garry Rogers Motorsport	207
5	15	(Germany) Jörg Bergmeister	Kelly Racing	207

== Standings ==
- After 22 of 28 races.

Pos	No	Name	Team	Points
1	88	(Australia) Jamie Whincup	Triple Eight Race Engineering	2517
2	888	(Australia) Craig Lowndes	Triple Eight Race Engineering	2374
3	9	(New Zealand) Shane van Gisbergen	Stone Brothers Racing	2009
4	5	(Australia) Mark Winterbottom	Ford Performance Racing	1966
5	2	(Australia) Garth Tander	Holden Racing Team	1956
