= 2011 Skycity Triple Crown =

V8 Supercars race in Darwin, Australia

(Northern Territory) 2011 Skycity Triple Crown
Event Information
- Round 6 of 14 in the 2011 International V8 Supercars Championship
- Date: 17–19 June 2011
- Location: Darwin, Northern Territory
- Venue: Hidden Valley Raceway
- Weather: Fine

Results
Race 1
Distance	42 laps	120 km
Pole position	Mark Winterbottom; Ford Performance Racing	1:09.1697
Winner	Rick Kelly; Kelly Racing	54:30.8593
Race 2
Distance	69 laps	200 km
Pole position	Mark Winterbottom; Ford Performance Racing	1:09.7935
Winner	Shane van Gisbergen; Stone Brothers Racing	1:27:04.3716

The 2011 Skycity Triple Crown was a motor race for the Australian sedan-based V8 Supercars racing cars. It was the sixth event of the 2011 International V8 Supercars Championship. It was held on the weekend of June 17 to 19 at Hidden Valley Raceway in Darwin, Northern Territory. It was the fourteenth V8 Supercar event held at the circuit.

The event hosted races 12 and 13 of the 2011 season. A 42 lap, 120-kilometre race was held on Saturday while Sunday saw a 69 lap, 200-kilometre race. Qualifying for Race 12 consisted of a 20-minute, all-in session with the fastest ten progressing to the top ten shootout. Qualifying for Race 13 was a single 20 minute, all-in session.

Ford Performance Racing's Mark Winterbottom took his second consecutive pole position in qualifying for Race 12 after taking pole for the Sunday race at Winton. He was followed by the Triple Eight Race Engineering Holden of championship leader Jamie Whincup and Shane van Gisbergen of Stone Brothers Racing. These three drivers remained untroubled at the front for the majority of the race until the final safety car restart. Whincup tapped the back of Winterbottom and in response, Winterbottom slowed. This backed the field up and Winterbottom, Whincup and Van Gisbergen raced down the main straight three abreast. Towards the end of the straight, Garry Rogers Motorsport driver Lee Holdsworth pulled out of the slipstream of the top three and made it four-wide into turn one. Winterbottom and Whincup made contact which sent Whincup and Van Gisbergen off onto the grass and Winterbottom then made contact with Holdsworth before spinning in the middle of turn one and being hit by Karl Reindler. Kelly Racing's Rick Kelly emerged in the lead followed by Holdsworth, Steven Johnson and Craig Lowndes. Kelly went on to win the race, his second of the season, from Johnson and Lowndes, with Holdsworth slipping back to fourth with damaged steering. After being the top three for most of the race, Winterbottom, Whincup and Van Gisbergen finished fifteenth, ninth and seventh respectively, with each driver being penalised 25 championship points for their involvement in the incident.

Drivers in the midfield also had their dramas. Rod Nash Racing driver Paul Dumbrell went off at turn five on lap one, rejoining in the lead at turn seven. Dumbrell readdressed his position on the main straight and a penalty was not applied, causing controversy amongst the field. Jason Bright, winner for Brad Jones Racing on Sunday at Winton, experienced a puncture after contact with Tony D'Alberto and was hit by David Reynolds as he attempted to limp back to the pit lane. The collision put both drivers out of the race. Garth Tander was given a penalty after he left his Holden Racing Team pit bay with the air hose still attached and dragged it along the pit lane.

Winterbottom and Whincup again filled the front row for Race 13, with Lowndes and Holdsworth on row two. Holdsworth, one of the only drivers on the softer tyre, led into turn one while Whincup, also on the soft tyre, bogged it down and dropped to the back of the top ten. Jason Bright again failed to finish when his engine failed at the end of the main straight, causing him to spin off the track. Reigning champion James Courtney, Karl Reindler and Rick Kelly went off on Bright's oil. Whincup and Holdsworth were first and second until late in the race, courtesy of using the soft tyre early on. Lowndes passed Holdsworth, five seconds behind Whincup, on lap 58 and on the same lap Reindler spun off the track and into the wall at turn eleven. The safety car was deployed, reducing Whincup's lead to nothing. Lowndes overtook Whincup on the restart and Whincup and Holdsworth began to slide down the order on hard tyres with the other drivers on soft tyres. Van Gisbergen caught and passed Lowndes with two laps remaining and held on to take his second win of the season.

With Lowndes finishing ahead of Whincup in both races and Whincup's 25-point penalty, the gap between the Triple Eight team mates in the championship decreased from 262 points to 156. Van Gisbergen remained in third place, 261 points behind Whincup. Following the event, Lowndes was fined $10,000 for performing a burnout at the entry to the podium area.

== Results ==
Results as follows:

=== Qualifying Race 12 ===
Qualifying timesheet:

Pos	No	Name	Car	Team	Qualifying	Shootout
1	5	Mark Winterbottom	Ford FG Falcon	Ford Performance Racing	1:09.2123	1:09.1697
2	88	Jamie Whincup	Holden VE Commodore	Triple Eight Race Engineering	1:09.4666	1:09.1749
3	9	Shane van Gisbergen	Ford FG Falcon	Stone Brothers Racing	1:09.5613	1:09.3509
4	17	Steven Johnson	Ford FG Falcon	Dick Johnson Racing	1:09.4370	1:09.3581
5	47	Tim Slade	Ford FG Falcon	James Rosenberg Racing	1:09.6157	1:09.4035
6	33	Lee Holdsworth	Holden VE Commodore	Garry Rogers Motorsport	1:09.6496	1:09.4425
7	888	Craig Lowndes	Holden VE Commodore	Triple Eight Race Engineering	1:09.5040	1:09.6001
8	11	Greg Murphy	Holden Commodore VE	Kelly Racing	1:09.5003	1:09.6093
9	49	Steve Owen	Holden VE Commodore	Paul Morris Motorsport	1:09.5671	1:10.1316
10	55	Paul Dumbrell	Ford FG Falcon	Rod Nash Racing	1:09.6445	no time^{1}
11	1	James Courtney	Holden VE Commodore	Holden Racing Team	1:09.6744	
12	15	Rick Kelly	Holden VE Commodore	Kelly Racing	1:09.7195	
13	16	David Reynolds	Holden VE Commodore	Kelly Racing	1:09.7198	
14	3	Tony D'Alberto	Ford FG Falcon	Tony D'Alberto Racing	1:09.7815	
15	8	Jason Bright	Holden VE Commodore	Brad Jones Racing	1:09.8073	
16	34	Michael Caruso	Holden VE Commodore	Garry Rogers Motorsport	1:09.8080	
17	14	Jason Bargwanna	Holden VE Commodore	Brad Jones Racing	1:09.8170	
18	39	Russell Ingall	Holden VE Commodore	Paul Morris Motorsport	1:09.8397	
19	2	Garth Tander	Holden VE Commodore	Holden Racing Team	1:09.8419	
20	6	Will Davison	Ford FG Falcon	Ford Performance Racing	1:09.8674	
21	61	Fabian Coulthard	Holden VE Commodore	Walkinshaw Racing	1:09.8798	
22	18	James Moffat	Ford FG Falcon	Dick Johnson Racing	1:09.9412	
23	12	Dean Fiore	Ford FG Falcon	Triple F Racing	1:09.9566	
24	4	Alex Davison	Ford FG Falcon	Stone Brothers Racing	1:09.9702	
25	7	Todd Kelly	Holden VE Commodore	Kelly Racing	1:09.9859	
26	19	Jonathon Webb	Ford FG Falcon	Tekno Autosports	1:10.0551	
27	21	Karl Reindler	Holden VE Commodore	Britek Motorsport	1:10.0872	
28	30	Warren Luff	Holden VE Commodore	Lucas Dumbrell Motorsport	1:10.1573	

1. - Paul Dumbrell ran off the road at turn one on his shootout lap and opted not to complete the lap.

=== Race 12 ===
Race timesheets:

Pos	No	Name	Team	Laps	Time/Retired	Grid	Points
1	15	Rick Kelly	Kelly Racing	42	54:30.8593	12	150
2	17	Steven Johnson	Dick Johnson Racing	42	+2.5s	4	138
3	888	Craig Lowndes	Triple Eight Race Engineering	42	+4.5s	7	129
4	33	Lee Holdsworth	Garry Rogers Motorsport	42	+5.4s	6	120
5	6	Will Davison	Ford Performance Racing	42	+6.0s	20	111
6	3	Tony D'Alberto	Tony D'Alberto Racing	42	+6.4s	14	102
7	9	Shane van Gisbergen	Stone Brothers Racing	42	+6.6s	3	96
8	14	Jason Bargwanna	Brad Jones Racing	42	+7.3s	17	90
9	88	Jamie Whincup	Triple Eight Race Engineering	42	+8.4s	2	84
10	49	Steve Owen	Paul Morris Motorsport	42	+12.8s	9	78
11	34	Michael Caruso	Garry Rogers Motorsport	42	+12.9s	16	72
12	11	Greg Murphy	Kelly Racing	42	+13.0s	8	69
13	61	Fabian Coulthard	Walkinshaw Racing	42	+13.4s	21	66
14	18	James Moffat	Dick Johnson Racing	42	+13.8s	22	63
15	5	Mark Winterbottom	Ford Performance Racing	42	+15.6s	1	60
16	7	Todd Kelly	Kelly Racing	42	+17.0s	25	57
17	12	Dean Fiore	Triple F Racing	42	+17.5s	23	54
18	2	Garth Tander	Holden Racing Team	42	+18.4s	19	51
19	4	Alex Davison	Stone Brothers Racing	42	+18.7s	24	48
20	55	Paul Dumbrell	Rod Nash Racing	42	+22.4s	10	45
21	47	Tim Slade	James Rosenberg Racing	42	+22.8s	5	42
22	19	Jonathon Webb	Tekno Autosports	42	+23.1s	26	39
23	39	Russell Ingall	Paul Morris Motorsport	42	+24.0s	18	36
24	30	Warren Luff	Lucas Dumbrell Motorsport	41	+ 1 lap	27	33
25	1	James Courtney	Holden Racing Team	40	+ 2 laps	11	30
Ret	21	Karl Reindler	Britek Motorsport	38	Accident	28	
Ret	8	Jason Bright	Brad Jones Racing	9	Collision	15	
Ret	16	David Reynolds	Kelly Racing	9	Collision	13	

=== Qualifying Race 13 ===
Qualifying timesheet:

Pos	No	Name	Car	Team	Time
1	5	Mark Winterbottom	Ford FG Falcon	Ford Performance Racing	1:09.7935
2	88	Jamie Whincup	Holden VE Commodore	Triple Eight Race Engineering	1:09.8556
3	888	Craig Lowndes	Holden VE Commodore	Triple Eight Race Engineering	1:09.8624
4	33	Lee Holdsworth	Holden VE Commodore	Garry Rogers Motorsport	1:09.9089
5	3	Tony D'Alberto	Ford FG Falcon	Tony D'Alberto Racing	1:09.9221
6	6	Will Davison	Ford FG Falcon	Ford Performance Racing	1:09.9280
7	47	Tim Slade	Ford FG Falcon	James Rosenberg Racing	1:09.9331
8	17	Steven Johnson	Ford FG Falcon	Dick Johnson Racing	1:10.0067
9	4	Alex Davison	Ford FG Falcon	Stone Brothers Racing	1:10.0298
10	39	Russell Ingall	Holden VE Commodore	Paul Morris Motorsport	1:10.0305
11	19	Jonathon Webb	Ford FG Falcon	Tekno Autosports	1:10.1186
12	9	Shane van Gisbergen	Ford FG Falcon	Stone Brothers Racing	1:10.1219
13	16	David Reynolds	Holden VE Commodore	Kelly Racing	1:10.1322
14	15	Rick Kelly	Holden VE Commodore	Kelly Racing	1:10.1338
15	2	Garth Tander	Holden VE Commodore	Holden Racing Team	1:10.1567
16	61	Fabian Coulthard	Holden VE Commodore	Walkinshaw Racing	1:10.1681
17	11	Greg Murphy	Holden VE Commodore	Kelly Racing	1:10.1766
18	8	Jason Bright	Holden VE Commodore	Brad Jones Racing	1:10.1881
19	55	Paul Dumbrell	Ford FG Falcon	Rod Nash Racing	1:10.2009
20	34	Michael Caruso	Holden VE Commodore	Garry Rogers Motorsport	1:10.2202
21	1	James Courtney	Holden VE Commodore	Holden Racing Team	1:10.2220
22	21	Karl Reindler	Holden VE Commodore	Britek Motorsport	1:10.3047
23	7	Todd Kelly	Holden VE Commodore	Kelly Racing	1:10.3243
24	30	Warren Luff	Holden Commodore VE	Lucas Dumbrell Motorsport	1:10.4014
25	12	Dean Fiore	Ford FG Falcon	Triple F Racing	1:10.4051
26	18	James Moffat	Ford FG Falcon	Dick Johnson Racing	1:10.4504
27	49	Steve Owen	Holden VE Commodore	Paul Morris Motorsport	1:10.4593
28	14	Jason Bargwanna	Holden VE Commodore	Brad Jones Racing	1:10.4973

=== Race 13 ===
Race timesheets:

Pos	No	Name	Team	Laps	Time/Retired	Grid	Points
1	9	Shane van Gisbergen	Stone Brothers Racing	69	1:27:04.3716	12	150
2	888	Craig Lowndes	Triple Eight Race Engineering	69	+0.9s	3	138
3	5	Mark Winterbottom	Ford Performance Racing	69	+1.7s	1	129
4	47	Tim Slade	James Rosenberg Racing	69	+2.1s	7	120
5	39	Russell Ingall	Paul Morris Motorsport	69	+5.0s	10	111
6	88	Jamie Whincup	Triple Eight Race Engineering	69	+7.2s	2	102
7	6	Will Davison	Ford Performance Racing	69	+7.8s	6	96
8	4	Alex Davison	Stone Brothers Racing	69	+10.7s	9	90
9	17	Steven Johnson	Dick Johnson Racing	69	+11.3s	8	84
10	14	Jason Bargwanna	Brad Jones Racing	69	+13.0s	28	78
11	55	Paul Dumbrell	Rod Nash Racing	69	+13.1s	19	72
12	34	Michael Caruso	Garry Rogers Motorsport	69	+14.7s	20	69
13	18	James Moffat	Dick Johnson Racing	69	+16.0s	26	66
14	49	Steve Owen	Paul Morris Motorsport	69	+16.1s	27	63
15	33	Lee Holdsworth	Garry Rogers Motorsport	69	+18.1s	4	60
16	19	Jonathon Webb	Tekno Autosports	69	+20.6s	11	57
17	3	Tony D'Alberto	Tony D'Alberto Racing	69	+24.7s	5	54
18	61	Fabian Coulthard	Walkinshaw Racing	69	+27.8s	16	51
19	12	Dean Fiore	Triple F Racing	69	+29.1s	25	48
20	15	Rick Kelly	Kelly Racing	69	+39.6s	14	45
21	16	David Reynolds	Kelly Racing	69	+45.5s	13	42
22	11	Greg Murphy	Kelly Racing	68	+ 1 lap	17	39
23	30	Warren Luff	Lucas Dumbrell Motorsport	68	+ 1 lap	24	36
24	1	James Courtney	Holden Racing Team	63	+ 6 laps	21	33
25	21	Karl Reindler	Britek Motorsport	63	+ 6 laps	22	30
26	2	Garth Tander	Holden Racing Team	56	+ 13 laps	15	27
Ret	7	Todd Kelly	Kelly Racing	45	Wheel	23	
Ret	8	Jason Bright	Brad Jones Racing	10	Engine	18	

== Standings ==
- After 13 of 28 races.

Pos	No	Name	Team	Points
1	88	Jamie Whincup	Triple Eight Race Engineering	1395
2	888	Craig Lowndes	Triple Eight Race Engineering	1239
3	9	Shane van Gisbergen	Stone Brothers Racing	1134
4	15	Rick Kelly	Kelly Racing	1082
5	17	Steven Johnson	Dick Johnson Racing	1030
