= 2011 Yas V8 400 =

2011 V8 Supercar championship race

(United Arab Emirates) 2011 Yas V8 400
Event Information
- Round 1 of 14 in the 2011 International V8 Supercars Championship
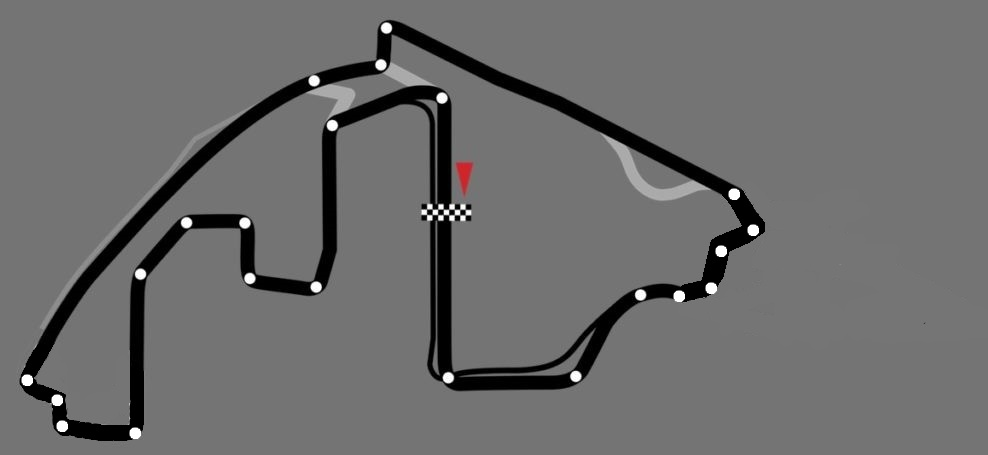
- Date: 10–12 February 2011
- Location: Yas Island, United Arab Emirates
- Venue: Yas Marina Circuit
- Weather: Fine

Results
Race 1
Distance	43 laps	200 km
Pole position	Craig Lowndes; Triple Eight Race Engineering	1:57.229
Winner	Jamie Whincup; Triple Eight Race Engineering	1:27:01.678
Race 2
Distance	43 laps	200 km
Pole position	Jamie Whincup; Triple Eight Race Engineering	1:56.429
Winner	James Courtney; Holden Racing Team	1:43:14.651

The 2011 Yas V8 400 was a motor race for the Australian sedan-based V8 Supercars. It was the first race of the 2011 International V8 Supercars Championship. It was held on the weekend of 10–12 February at the Yas Marina Circuit, in Abu Dhabi, United Arab Emirates. It was the second time V8 Supercar visited the circuit.

The weekend's race victories were shared between 2008 and 2009 champion Jamie Whincup of Triple Eight Race Engineering and 2010 champion James Courtney, who made his début with Holden Racing Team, having moved from Dick Johnson Racing over the off-season. Whincup took the championship lead after following up his race one victory, with third place behind Courtney and Brad Jones Racing's Jason Bright in race two. Despite winning the second race, Courtney trailed Whincup by 152 points after the weekend, after being docked 50 points for careless driving in race one. Stone Brothers Racing drivers Alex Davison equalled his best result in the series, matching his second-place finish at the Darwin round in 2009, in race one. Davison's seventh-place finish in the second race was enough for him to end the weekend second in points. Team-mate Shane van Gisbergen also finished both races in the top ten, with his fourth and eighth places enough to place him third in points.

== Results ==
Results as follows:

=== Race 1 ===
==== Qualifying ====
Pos	No	Name	Car	Team	Time
1	888	(Australia) Craig Lowndes	Triple Eight Race Engineering	Holden VE Commodore	1:57.229
2	88	(Australia) Jamie Whincup	Triple Eight Race Engineering	Holden VE Commodore	1:57.460
3	4	(Australia) Alex Davison	Stone Brothers Racing	Ford FG Falcon	1:57.529
4	5	(Australia) Mark Winterbottom	Ford Performance Racing	Ford FG Falcon	1:57.619
5	55	(Australia) Paul Dumbrell	Rod Nash Racing	Ford FG Falcon	1:57.628
6	47	(Australia) Tim Slade	James Rosenberg Racing	Ford FG Falcon	1:57.739
7	8	(Australia) Jason Bright	Brad Jones Racing	Holden VE Commodore	1:57.779
8	17	(Australia) Steven Johnson	Dick Johnson Racing	Ford FG Falcon	1:57.783
9	33	(Australia) Lee Holdsworth	Garry Rogers Motorsport	Holden VE Commodore	1:57.813
10	19	(Australia) Jonathon Webb	Tekno Autosports	Ford FG Falcon	1:57.955
11	61	(New Zealand) Fabian Coulthard	Walkinshaw Racing	Holden VE Commodore	1:57.960
12	6	(Australia) Will Davison	Ford Performance Racing	Ford FG Falcon	1:57.964
13	49	(Australia) Steve Owen	Paul Morris Motorsport	Holden VE Commodore	1:57.982
14	2	(Australia) Garth Tander	Holden Racing Team	Holden VE Commodore	1:57.986
15	9	(New Zealand) Shane van Gisbergen	Stone Brothers Racing	Ford FG Falcon	1:58.011
16	3	(Australia) Tony D'Alberto	Tony D'Alberto Racing	Holden VE Commodore	1:58.071
17	7	(Australia) Todd Kelly	Kelly Racing	Holden VE Commodore	1:58.205
18	34	(Australia) Michael Caruso	Garry Rogers Motorsport	Holden VE Commodore	1:58.312
19	14	(Australia) Jason Bargwanna	Brad Jones Racing	Holden VE Commodore	1:58.316
20	1	(Australia) James Courtney	Holden Racing Team	Holden VE Commodore	1:58.381
21	39	(Australia) Russell Ingall	Paul Morris Motorsport	Holden VE Commodore	1:58.454
22	21	(Australia) Karl Reindler	Britek Motorsport	Holden VE Commodore	1:58.463
23	16	(Australia) David Reynolds	Kelly Racing	Holden VE Commodore	1:58.480
24	30	(Australia) Warren Luff	Lucas Dumbrell Motorsport	Holden VE Commodore	1:58.578
25	15	(Australia) Rick Kelly	Kelly Racing	Holden VE Commodore	1:58.607
26	12	(Australia) Dean Fiore	Triple F Racing	Ford FG Falcon	1:58.926
27	11	(New Zealand) Greg Murphy	Kelly Racing	Holden VE Commodore	1:59.056
28	18	(Australia) James Moffat	Dick Johnson Racing	Ford FG Falcon	1:59.108

==== Race ====
Race timesheets:

Pos	No	Name	Team	Laps	Time/Retired	Grid	Points
1	88	(Australia) Jamie Whincup	Triple Eight Race Engineering	43	1hr 27min 01.678sec	2	150
2	4	(Australia) Alex Davison	Stone Brothers Racing	43	+13.202	3	138
3	5	(Australia) Mark Winterbottom	Ford Performance Racing	43	+15.282	4	129
4	9	(New Zealand) Shane van Gisbergen	Stone Brothers Racing	43	+19.901	15	120
5	47	(Australia) Tim Slade	James Rosenberg Racing	43	+20.984	6	111
6	2	(Australia) Garth Tander	Holden Racing Team	43	+30.989	14	102
7	888	(Australia) Craig Lowndes	Triple Eight Race Engineering	43	+37.346	1	96
8	61	(New Zealand) Fabian Coulthard	Walkinshaw Racing	43	+38.428	11	90
9	33	(Australia) Lee Holdsworth	Garry Rogers Motorsport	43	+57.995	9	84
10	7	(Australia) Todd Kelly	Kelly Racing	43	+1:01.376	17	78
11	17	(Australia) Steven Johnson	Dick Johnson Racing	43	+1:03.349	8	72
12	6	(Australia) Will Davison	Ford Performance Racing	43	+1:10.576	12	69
13	15	(Australia) Rick Kelly	Kelly Racing	43	+1:16.422	25	66
14	49	(Australia) Steve Owen	Paul Morris Motorsport	43	+1:17.254	13	63
15	34	(Australia) Michael Caruso	Garry Rogers Motorsport	43	+1:19.802	18	60
16	18	(Australia) James Moffat	Dick Johnson Racing	43	+1:22.062	28	57
17	16	(Australia) David Reynolds	Kelly Racing	43	+1:27.459	23	54
18	3	(Australia) Tony D'Alberto	Tony D'Alberto Racing	43	+1:29.439	16	51
19	14	(Australia) Jason Bargwanna	Brad Jones Racing	43	+1:32.847	19	48
20	19	(Australia) Jonathon Webb	Tekno Autosports	43	+1:35.233	10	45
21	11	(New Zealand) Greg Murphy	Kelly Racing	43	+1:40.083	27	42
22	12	(Australia) Dean Fiore	Triple F Racing	43	+1:57.979	26	39
23	30	(Australia) Warren Luff	Lucas Dumbrell Motorsport	42	+ 1 lap	24	36
24	39	(Australia) Russell Ingall	Paul Morris Motorsport	42	+ 1 lap	21	33
25	55	(Australia) Paul Dumbrell	Rod Nash Racing	39	+ 4 laps	5	30
26	1	(Australia) James Courtney	Holden Racing Team	39	+ 4 laps	20	27
Ret	21	(Australia) Karl Reindler	Britek Motorsport	41	Accident	22	
NC	8	(Australia) Jason Bright	Brad Jones Racing	20	+ 23 laps	7	
Fastest lap: Jamie Whincup (Triple Eight Race Engineering), 1:57.8540

=== Race 2 ===
==== Qualifying ====
Pos	No	Name	Team	Car	Time
1	88	(Australia) Jamie Whincup	Triple Eight Race Engineering	Holden VE Commodore	1:56.429
2	888	(Australia) Craig Lowndes	Triple Eight Race Engineering	Holden VE Commodore	1:56.718
3	5	(Australia) Mark Winterbottom	Ford Performance Racing	Ford FG Falcon	1:56.771
4	17	(Australia) Steven Johnson	Dick Johnson Racing	Ford FG Falcon	1:56.966
5	1	(Australia) James Courtney	Holden Racing Team	Holden VE Commodore	1:56.988
6	33	(Australia) Lee Holdsworth	Garry Rogers Motorsport	Holden VE Commodore	1:57.049
7	8	(Australia) Jason Bright	Brad Jones Racing	Holden VE Commodore	1:57.050
8	4	(Australia) Alex Davison	Stone Brothers Racing	Ford FG Falcon	1:57.052
9	34	(Australia) Michael Caruso	Garry Rogers Motorsport	Holden VE Commodore	1:57.096
10	47	(Australia) Tim Slade	James Rosenberg Racing	Ford FG Falcon	1:57.116
11	55	(Australia) Paul Dumbrell	Rod Nash Racing	Ford FG Falcon	1:57.403
12	7	(Australia) Todd Kelly	Kelly Racing	Holden VE Commodore	1:57.406
13	6	(Australia) Will Davison	Ford Performance Racing	Ford FG Falcon	1:57.419
14	2	(Australia) Garth Tander	Holden Racing Team	Holden VE Commodore	1:57.443
15	39	(Australia) Russell Ingall	Paul Morris Motorsport	Holden VE Commodore	1:57.532
16	3	(Australia) Tony D'Alberto	Tony D'Alberto Racing	Holden VE Commodore	1:57.550
17	19	(Australia) Jonathon Webb	Tekno Autosports	Ford FG Falcon	1:57.571
18	9	(New Zealand) Shane van Gisbergen	Stone Brothers Racing	Ford FG Falcon	1:57.628
19	61	(New Zealand) Fabian Coulthard	Walkinshaw Racing	Holden VE Commodore	1:57.673
20	49	(Australia) Steve Owen	Paul Morris Motorsport	Holden VE Commodore	1:57.742
21	16	(Australia) David Reynolds	Kelly Racing	Holden VE Commodore	1:57.770
22	18	(Australia) James Moffat	Dick Johnson Racing	Ford FG Falcon	1:57.869
23	12	(Australia) Dean Fiore	Triple F Racing	Ford FG Falcon	1:58.165
24	11	(New Zealand) Greg Murphy	Kelly Racing	Holden VE Commodore	1:58.175
25	14	(Australia) Jason Bargwanna	Brad Jones Racing	Holden VE Commodore	1:58.175
26	30	(Australia) Warren Luff	Lucas Dumbrell Motorsport	Holden VE Commodore	1:58.206
27	15	(Australia) Rick Kelly	Kelly Racing	Holden VE Commodore	1:58.391
28	21	(Australia) Karl Reindler	Britek Motorsport	Holden VE Commodore	1:58.651

==== Race ====
Pos	No	Name	Team	Laps	Time/Retired	Grid	Points
1	1	(Australia) James Courtney	Holden Racing Team	43	1hr 43min 14.651sec	5	150
2	8	(Australia) Jason Bright	Brad Jones Racing	43	+0.607	7	138
3	88	(Australia) Jamie Whincup	Triple Eight Race Engineering	43	+4.827	1	129
4	16	(Australia) David Reynolds	Kelly Racing	43	+7.941	21	120
5	34	(Australia) Michael Caruso	Garry Rogers Motorsport	43	+12.345	9	111
6	19	(Australia) Jonathon Webb	Tekno Autosports	43	+13.100	17	102
7	4	(Australia) Alex Davison	Stone Brothers Racing	43	+13.656	8	96
8	9	(New Zealand) Shane van Gisbergen	Stone Brothers Racing	43	+14.199	18	90
9	11	(New Zealand) Greg Murphy	Kelly Racing	43	+18.076	24	84
10	55	(Australia) Paul Dumbrell	Rod Nash Racing	43	+20.280	11	78
11	21	(Australia) Karl Reindler	Britek Motorsport	43	+20.497	28	72
12	14	(Australia) Jason Bargwanna	Brad Jones Racing	43	+21.070	25	69
13	49	(Australia) Steve Owen	Paul Morris Motorsport	43	+25.713	20	66
14	5	(Australia) Mark Winterbottom	Ford Performance Racing	43	+28.110	3	63
15	61	(New Zealand) Fabian Coulthard	Walkinshaw Racing	43	+42.488	19	60
16	6	(Australia) Will Davison	Ford Performance Racing	43	+49.120	13	57
17	30	(Australia) Warren Luff	Lucas Dumbrell Motorsport	43	+55.617	26	54
18	17	(Australia) Steven Johnson	Dick Johnson Racing	43	+59.414	4	51
19	15	(Australia) Rick Kelly	Kelly Racing	42	+1 lap	27	48
20	12	(Australia) Dean Fiore	Triple F Racing	42	+1 lap	23	45
21	888	(Australia) Craig Lowndes	Triple Eight Race Engineering	42	+1 lap	2	42
22	33	(Australia) Lee Holdsworth	Garry Rogers Motorsport	38	+5 laps	6	39
Ret	18	(Australia) James Moffat	Dick Johnson Racing	26	Retired	22	
Ret	39	(Australia) Russell Ingall	Paul Morris Motorsport	19	Collision	15	
Ret	7	(Australia) Todd Kelly	Kelly Racing	3	Suspension	12	
Ret	47	(Australia) Tim Slade	James Rosenberg Racing	0	Collision	10	
Ret	3	(Australia) Tony D'Alberto	Tony D'Alberto Racing	0	Collision	16	
Ret	2	(Australia) Garth Tander	Holden Racing Team	0	Collision	14	
Fastest lap: Jason Bargwanna (Brad Jones Racing), 1:57.7400

== Standings ==
- After 2 of 28 races.

Pos	No	Name	Team	Points
1	88	(Australia) Jamie Whincup	Triple Eight Race Engineering	279
2	4	(Australia) Alex Davison	Stone Brothers Racing	234
3	9	(New Zealand) Shane van Gisbergen	Stone Brothers Racing	210
4	5	(Australia) Mark Winterbottom	Ford Performance Racing	192
5	1	(Australia) James Courtney	Holden Racing Team	177

== See also ==
- 2011 Yas Marina Circuit GP2 Asia Series round
