= Karl Reindler =

Australian racing driver (born 1985)

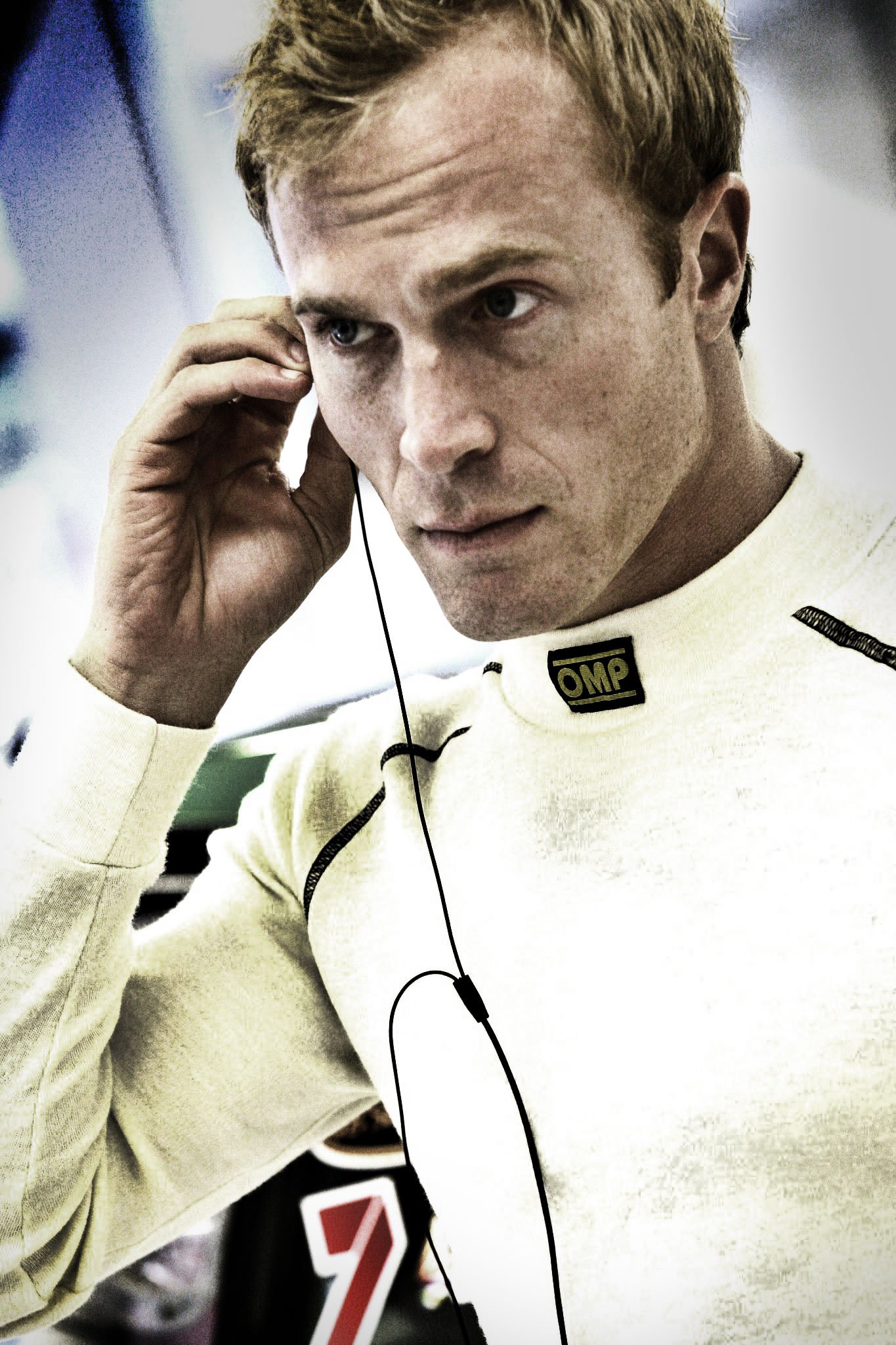
- Reindler in Abu Dhabi, 2011
- Nationality: (Australia) Australian
- Born: Karl William Reindler; 18 April 1985 (age 41) Perth, Western Australia

Supercars career
- Debut season: 2008
- Former teams: Ford Rising Stars Racing; Britek Motorsport; Stone Brothers Racing; Brad Jones Racing; Kelly Racing; Nissan Motorsport; Team 18
- Starts: 103
- Championships: 0
- Wins: 0
- Podiums: 0
- Poles: 0
- Fastest laps: 1
- Best finish: 24th in 2012
- Finished last season: 45th

Previous series
- 2003–04 2005–06 2006–07 2007 2008 2013: Australian Formula 3 British Formula Three; A1 Grand Prix; Formula V6 Asia; Fujitsu V8 Supercar Series; Australian Carrera Cup

Championship titles
- 2004: Australian Formula 3

Awards
- 2003 2008: Australian F3 Rookie of the Year; Mike Kable Young Gun Award

Karl William Reindler (born 18 April 1985) is an Australian racing driver, who has previously competed in the Supercars Championship. He currently shares duties with Bruno Correia as the Medical Car driver for Formula One.

== Biography ==
=== Formula Three ===
Off the back of winning Rookie of the Year in the 2003 Australian Formula 3 Championship, Reindler went on to win the 2004 Championship in the final round. At the completion of the 2004 season, Reindler competed in his first international event, the one-off Bahrain F3 SuperPrix, racing for the Swiss Racing Team. He finished 18th in what was regarded at the time as the unofficial World Championship for Formula 3 – select drivers from this event went on to winning championships in Formula 1, WEC, DTM, Super GT and Super Formula to name a few.

Reindler moved to Britain in 2005 to complete a part-season of the British Formula 3 Championship with Alan Docking Racing, commencing at round 7 at Monza, Italy, finishing seventh and tenth on debut. A season-best qualifying happened at the final round at the Silverstone Circuit, qualifying sixth and finishing seventh. At the conclusion of the 2005 season, Reindler qualified for and competed in the World-famous Macau Grand Prix, finishing 13th in a competitive field which included Sebastian Vettel, Robert Kubica, Romain Grosjean and eventual winner Lucas di Grassi. In 2006 he continued with the Alan Docking Racing squad in British F3, again, only completing part of the season and ultimately finishing 14th outright after a season littered with mechanical related retirements.

=== A1 Grand Prix ===
Reindler went on to represent Australia as the rookie driver in the penultimate race of the 2005–06 A1 Grand Prix season at Laguna Seca, then progressed to lead driver at the second round of the 2006–07 A1 Grand Prix season in the Czech Republic. At the third round of the season, at the demanding Beijing street circuit in China, Reindler fought hard to finish on the podium in the feature race. He continued with Team Australia until the Durban event in South Africa before the team changed their driver line-up. He joined the ranks of the Asian Formula Renault V6 series in 2007, but only ran two rounds, finishing on the podium in Autopolis, Japan.

=== Sedan Racing ===
2008 saw him join Matt Connolly Motorsports Pontiac GTO.R team for the Daytona 24 Hour. Reindler qualified the car third in GT, but had a raft of mechanical drama's during the race and finished 25th in class. This was in addition to a full season in Fujitsu series in 2008, partnering Dean Canto at Howard Racing. 8th outright in the Series earned him the V8 Supercar Mike Kable Rookie of the Year Award. Reindler also participated in that year's Bathurst 1000 replacing Grant Denyer at Ford Rising Stars Racing following his monster truck accident. 2009 saw just a handful of races which included the twin driver Australian Mini Challenge race in Perth where he shared with his younger brother Chris, not to mention partnering with Jason Bright for the V8 Supercar endurance events, which included an 11th-place finish at the Bathurst 1000.

Reindler joined V8 Supercars full-time in 2010. Reindler drove a Brad Jones Racing customer Holden Commodore under the banner of Britek Motorsport and Fair Dinkum Sheds Racing.

Reindler continued with the Brad Jones Racing team in 2011, and after a season-best qualifying and finish of sixth and seventh on the Saturday at the Barbagallo Raceway round in 2011, he was involved in a major start-line accident with Steve Owen on the Sunday. Reindler's clutch failed on the grid, causing the car to stall and was hit from behind at an estimated 150 km/h by Owen, the resulting impact rupturing the fuel cell, producing a major fireball. The fuel entered the car and starting burning it from the inside out. Reindler walked away suffering burns to his face and hands, was hospitalised and released that evening.

In 2012, Reindler joined Kelly Racing to drive the #11 Car as teammate to Greg Murphy for the 2012 season.

After three years full-time in V8 Supercars, Reindler took a step back in 2013, competing in a few select rounds of the Australian Carrera Cup Championship and teamed up with Rick Kelly in the factory Jack Daniel's Nissan Altima V8 Supercar for the V8 Supercar PIRTEK Enduro Cup. Despite being hindered by straight-line speed issues, the duo went on to lead the Gold Coast race and ultimately finish in sixth place.

2014 saw Reindler on a hiatus from the sport competing in only two events; the Bathurst 12hr which saw a pole position and fastest race lap in class, and the Phillip Island 101 of the Australian GT Championship where he took out a class win and fastest lap.

Reindler made his return to V8 Supercars alongside Tim Blanchard in the #3 Lucas Dumbrell Motorsport Holden Commodore (VF) at the 2015 Wilson Security Sandown 500, finishing eighth.

In 2016, Reindler joined Team 18 initially for the endurance championship but also filling in for Lee Holdsworth at Sydney Motorsport Park. He continued with the team in 2017.

== Personal life ==
Reindler was educated at Wesley College in South Perth. He is married to Olympic sailor Elise Rechichi, and they have two children.

== Career results ==
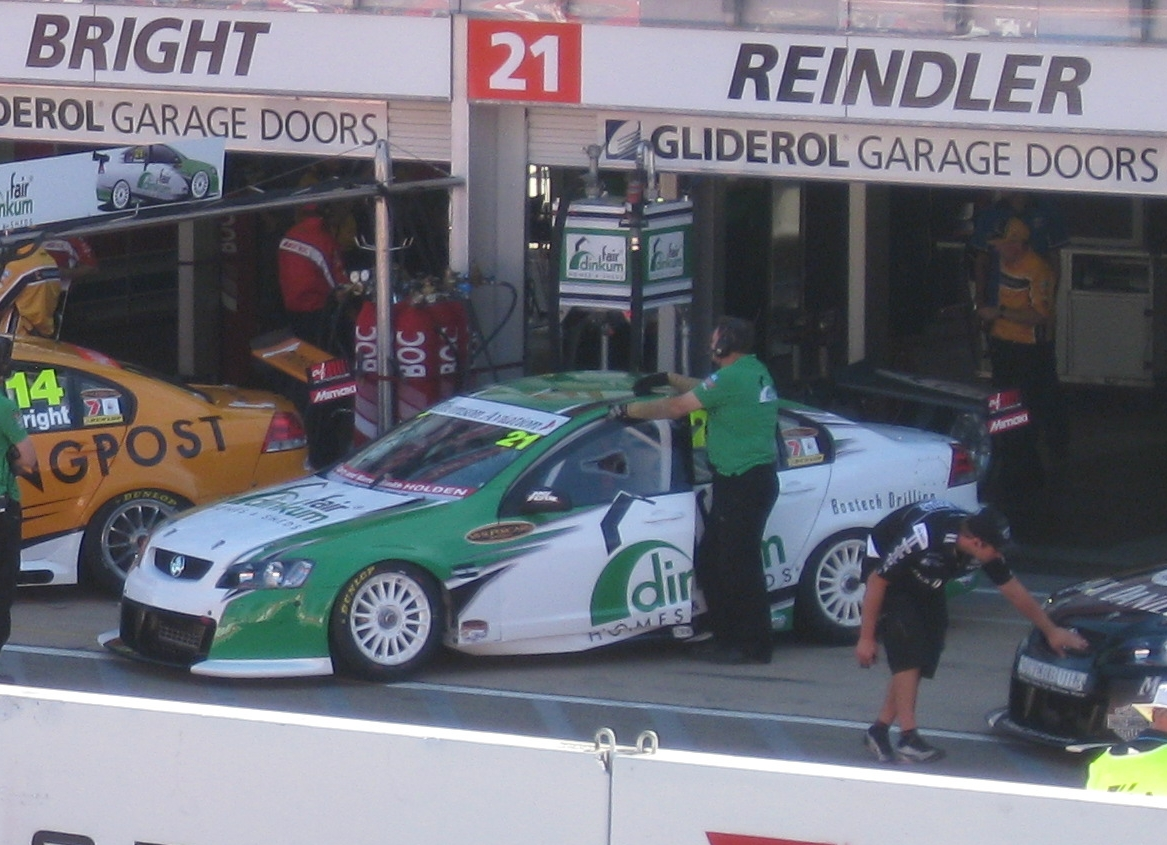
The Holden Commodore (VE) of Karl Reindler at the 2010 Clipsal 500 Adelaide.

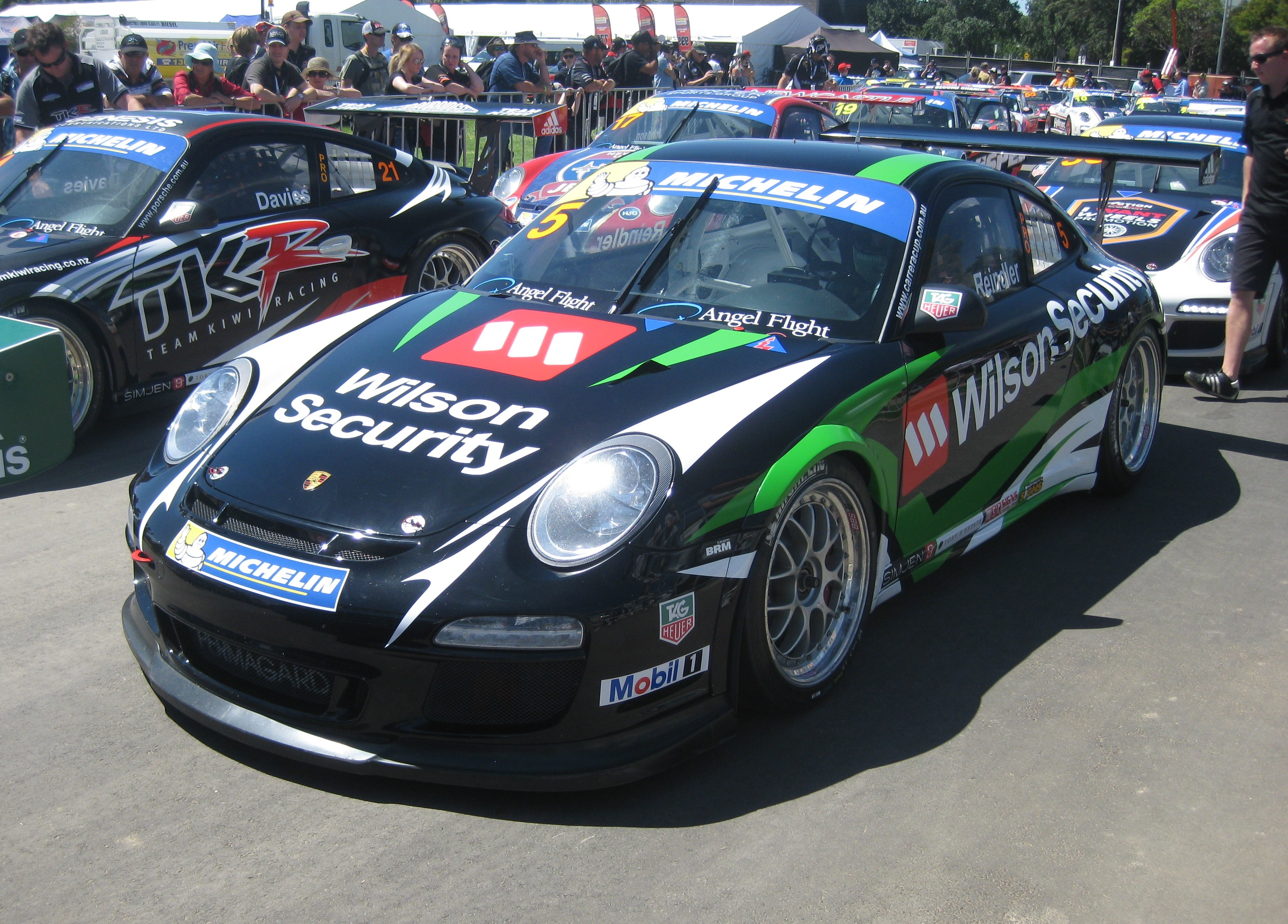
The Porsche 911 GT3 Cup Type 997 of Karl Reindler at the Adelaide Parklands Circuit for the opening round of the 2013 Australian Carrera Cup Championship

Season	Series	Position	Car	Team
2003	Australian Formula 3 Championship	6th	Dallara F301 Spiess Opel	Team BRM
2004	Australian Formula 3 Championship	**1st**	Dallara F301 Spiess Opel	Team BRM
2004	Lady Wigram Trophy	**3rd**	Dallara F301 Spiess Opel	Team BRM
2005	British Formula Three Championship	16th	Dallara F305 Mugen-Honda	Alan Docking Racing
2006	British Formula Three Championship	14th	Dallara F306 Mugen-Honda	Alan Docking Racing
2006–07	A1 Grand Prix	13th	Lola A1GP Zytek	A1 Team Australia
2007	Formula Renault V6 Asia	15th	Tatuus – Renault V6	Team E-Rain
2008	Fujitsu V8 Supercar Series	8th	Ford Falcon (BA)	Howard Racing
2008	V8 Supercar Championship Series	56th	Ford Falcon (FG)	Ford Rising Stars Racing
2008	Grand Am Series - GT Class	125th	Pontiac GXP.R	Matt Connolly Motorsports
2009	V8 Supercar Championship Series	43rd	Ford Falcon (FG)	Stone Brothers Racing
2009	Fujitsu V8 Supercar Series	20th	Ford Falcon (BF)	
2010	V8 Supercar Championship Series	27th	Holden Commodore (VE)	Britek Motorsport
2011	International V8 Supercars Championship	25th	Holden Commodore (VE)	Britek Motorsport
2012	International V8 Supercars Championship	24th	Holden Commodore (VE)	Kelly Racing
2013	Australian Carrera Cup Championship	22nd	Porsche 911 GT3 Cup Type 997	Team BRM
2013	International V8 Supercars Championship	42nd	Nissan Altima	Nissan Motorsport
2014	Australian GT Sports Championship	6th	Ginetta G50 GT4	Hogs Breath Cafe
2015	International V8 Supercars Championship	46th	Holden Commodore (VF)	Lucas Dumbrell Motorsport
2016	International V8 Supercars Championship	45th	Holden Commodore (VF)	Team 18
2017	Virgin Australia Supercars Championship	50th	Holden Commodore (VF)	Team 18

=== Complete Macau Grand Prix results ===
Year	Team	Car	Qualifying	Quali race	Main race
2005	(United Kingdom) Alan Docking Racing	Dallara F305 - Mugen-Honda	17th	17th	13th

=== Complete A1 Grand Prix results ===
(key) (Races in bold indicate pole position) (Races in italics indicate fastest lap)

Year	Entrant	1	2	3	4	5	6	7	8	9	10	11	12	13	14	15	16	17	18	19	20	21	22	DC	Points
2006–07	Australia	NED; SPR; PO	NED; FEA; PO	CZE; SPR; 15	CZE; FEA; 16	CHN; SPR; 12	CHN; FEA; 3	MYS; SPR; PO	MYS; FEA; PO	IDN; SPR; PO	IDN; FEA; PO	NZL; SPR; 14	NZL; FEA; 13	AUS; SPR; 14	AUS; FEA; 14	RSA; SPR; 16	RSA; FEA; Ret	MEX; SPR	MEX; FEA	CHN; SPR	CHN; FEA	GBR; SPR	GBR; SPR	13th	25

=== Complete Grand-Am Rolex Sports Car Series results ===
(key) (Races in bold indicate pole position)

Year	Team	Class	Make	Engine	1	2	3	4	5	6	7	8	9	10	11	12	13	Rank	Points
2008	Matt Connolly Motorsports	GT	Pontiac GXP.R	Pontiac 6.0 L V8	DAY; 27	MIA	MEX	VIR	LGA	LIM	WGL	MOH	DAY	BAR	MON	JER	MIL; 19	125th	16

=== 24 Hours of Daytona results ===
Year	Team	Co-drivers	Car	Class	Laps	Overall position	Class position
2008	(United States) Matt Connolly Motorsports	(United States) Hal Prewitt (United States) Spencer Trenery (United States) Vic Rice (Italy) Diego Alessi	Pontiac GXP.R	GT	513	47th	25th

=== Supercars Championship results ===
Supercars results
Year	Team	Car	1	2	3	4	5	6	7	8	9	10	11	12	13	14	15	16	17	18	19	20	21	22	23	24	25	26	27	28	29	30	31	32	33	34	35	36	37	38	Position	Points
2008	Ford Rising Stars Racing	Ford Falcon (BF)	ADE; R1	ADE; R2	EAS; R3	EAS; R4	EAS; R5	HAM; R6	HAM; R7	HAM; R8	BAR; R9	BAR; R10	BAR; R11	SAN; R12	SAN; R13	SAN; R14	HDV; R15	HDV; R16	HDV; R17	QLD; R18	QLD; R19	QLD; R20	WIN; R21	WIN; R22	WIN; R23	PHI; Q	PHI; R24	BAT; R25; 19	SUR; R26	SUR; R27	SUR; R28	BHR; R29	BHR; R30	BHR; R31	SYM; R32	SYM; R33	SYM; R34	ORA; R35	ORA; R36	ORA; R37	56th	96
2009	Britek Motorsport	Ford Falcon (FG)	ADE; R1	ADE; R2	HAM; R3	HAM; R4	WIN; R5	WIN; R6	SYM; R7	SYM; R8	HDV; R9	HDV; R10	TOW; R11	TOW; R12	SAN; R13	SAN; R14	QLD; R15	QLD; R16	PHI; Q 30	PHI; R17; 25	BAT; R18; 11	SUR; R19	SUR; R20	SUR; R21	SUR; R22	PHI; R23	PHI; R24	BAR; R25	BAR; R26	SYD; R27	SYD; R28										44th	192
2010	Britek Motorsport	Holden Commodore (VE)	YMC; R1; Ret	YMC; R2; 23	BHR; R3; 24	BHR; R4; Ret	ADE; R5; Ret	ADE; R6; 20	HAM; R7; 16	HAM; R8; 18	QLD; R9; 24	QLD; R10; Ret	WIN; R11; 21	WIN; R12; 23	HDV; R13; Ret	HDV; R14; 26	TOW; R15; 21	TOW; R16; Ret	PHI; Q 28	PHI; R17; 17	BAT; R18; 15	SUR; R19; 9	SUR; R20; Ret	SYM; R21; Ret	SYM; R22; 14	SAN; R23; 24	SAN; R24; 22	SYD; R25; Ret	SYD; R26; Ret												27th	823
2011	Britek Motorsport	Holden Commodore (VE)	YMC; R1; Ret	YMC; R2; 11	ADE; R3; 19	ADE; R4; 17	HAM; R5; 17	HAM; R6; 13	BAR; R7; 7	BAR; R8; Ret	BAR; R9; DNS	WIN; R10; 20	WIN; R11; 23	HID; R12; Ret	HID; R13; 25	TOW; R14; 22	TOW; R15; 24	QLD; R16; 9	QLD; R17; 16	QLD; R18; 16	PHI; Q 28	PHI; R19; 28	BAT; R20; 14	SUR; R21; Ret	SUR; R22; 22	SYM; R23; 24	SYM; R24; 20	SAN; R25; 20	SAN; R26; 17	SYD; R27; 19	SYD; R28; 18										25th	1144
2012	Kelly Racing	Holden Commodore (VE)	ADE; R1; 20	ADE; R2; 20	SYM; R3; 23	SYM; R4; 24	HAM; R5; Ret	HAM; R6; 20	BAR; R7; 23	BAR; R8; 23	BAR; R9; 17	PHI; R10; 16	PHI; R11; 23	HID; R12; 17	HID; R13; Ret	TOW; R14; 25	TOW; R15; 22	QLD; R16; 14	QLD; R17; 21	SMP; R18; 22	SMP; R19; 25	SAN; Q 25	SAN; R20; 20	BAT; R21; 19	SUR; R22; Ret	SUR; R23; DNS	YMC; R24; 21	YMC; R25; 21	YMC; R26; Ret	WIN; R27; 21	WIN; R28; 15	SYD; R29; 7	SYD; R30; 14								24th	1147
2013	Nissan Motorsport	Nissan Altima L33	ADE; R1	ADE; R2	SYM; R3	SYM; R4	SYM; R5	PUK; R6	PUK; R7	PUK; R8	PUK; R9	BAR; R10	BAR; R11	BAR; R12	COA; R13	COA; R14	COA; R15	COA; R16	HID; R17	HID; R18	HID; R19	TOW; R20; PO	TOW; R21; PO	QLD; R22	QLD; R23	QLD; R24	WIN; R25	WIN; R26	WIN; R27	SAN; Q 21	SAN; R28; 16	BAT; R29; 19	SUR; R30; 11	SUR; R31; 6	PHI; R32	PHI; R33	PHI; R34	SYD; R35	SYD; R36		42nd	384
2015	Lucas Dumbrell Motorsport	Holden Commodore (VF)	ADE; R1	ADE; R2	ADE; R3	SYM; R4	SYM; R5	SYM; R6	BAR; R7	BAR; R8	BAR; R9	WIN; R10	WIN; R11	WIN; R12	HID; R13	HID; R14	HID; R15	TOW; R16	TOW; R17	QLD; R18; PO	QLD; R19; PO	QLD; R20; PO	SMP; R21; PO	SMP; R22; PO	SMP; R23; PO	SAN; Q 10	SAN; R24; 8	BAT; R25; Ret	SUR; R26; 12	SUR; R27; 22	PUK; R28	PUK; R29	PUK; R30	PHI; R31	PHI; R32	PHI; R33	SYD; R34	SYD; R35	SYD; R36		46th	288
2016	Team 18	Holden Commodore (VF)	ADE; R1	ADE; R2	ADE; R3	SYM; R4	SYM; R5	PHI; R6	PHI; R7	BAR; R8	BAR; R9	WIN; R10; PO	WIN; R11; PO	HID; R12	HID; R13	TOW; R14	TOW; R15	QLD; R16; PO	QLD; R17; PO	SMP; R18; 22	SMP; R19; 23	SAN; Q 14	SAN; R20; 12	BAT; R21; Ret	SUR; R22; Ret	SUR; R23; 7	PUK; R24	PUK; R25	PUK; R26	PUK; R27	SYD; R28	SYD; R29									45th	309
2017	Team 18	Holden Commodore (VF)	ADE; R1	ADE; R2	SYM; R3	SYM; R4	PHI; R5	PHI; R6	BAR; R7	BAR; R8	WIN; R9; PO	WIN; R10; PO	HID; R11	HID; R12	TOW; R13	TOW; R14	QLD; R15; PO	QLD; R16; PO	SMP; R17	SMP; R18	SAN; Q 11	SAN; R19; 8	BAT; R20; Ret	SUR; R21; Ret	SUR; R22; 8	PUK; R23	PUK; R24	NEW; R25	NEW; R26												51st	270

=== Complete Bathurst 1000 results ===
Year	Team	Car	Co-driver	Position	Laps
2008	Ford Rising Stars Racing	Ford Falcon (BF)	(Australia) Michael Patrizi	19th	156
2009	Britek Motorsport	Ford Falcon (FG)	(Australia) Jason Bright	11th	161
2010	Britek Motorsport	Holden Commodore (VE)	(Australia) David Wall	15th	161
2011	Britek Motorsport	Holden Commodore (VE)	(Australia) David Wall	14th	161
2012	Kelly Racing	Holden Commodore (VE)	(New Zealand) Daniel Gaunt	19th	161
2013	Nissan Motorsport	Nissan Altima L33	(Australia) Rick Kelly	19th	161
2015	Lucas Dumbrell Motorsport	Holden Commodore (VF)	(Australia) Tim Blanchard	DNF	78
2016	Team 18	Holden Commodore (VF)	(Australia) Lee Holdsworth	DNF	2
2017	Team 18	Holden Commodore (VF)	(Australia) Lee Holdsworth	DNF	76

=== Complete Bathurst 12 Hour results ===
Year	Team	Co-drivers	Car	Class	Laps	Overall position	Class position
2014	(Australia) Griffith Corporation	(New Zealand) Daniel Gaunt (Australia) Mark Griffith	Ginetta G50 GT4	C	181	DNF	
2019	Ginetta Australia	(New Zealand) Aaron Love (Australia) Jimmy Vernon (Australia) Brad Schumacher	Ginetta G55 GT4	C	266	22nd	**3rd**

=== Complete Bathurst 6 Hour results ===
Year	Team	Co-drivers	Car	Class	Laps	Pos.	Class pos.
2017	(Australia) CXC Global/CGR Performance	(Australia) Andrew Richmond	Mitsubishi Lancer Evolution X RS	A1	113	5th	5th

Sporting positions
Preceded by Michael Caruso	Winner of the Australian Formula 3 Championship; 2004	Succeeded by Aaron Caratti
Awards and achievements
Preceded by Dale Wood	Mike Kable Young Gun Award; 2008	Succeeded by James Moffat
