= James Rosenberg Racing =

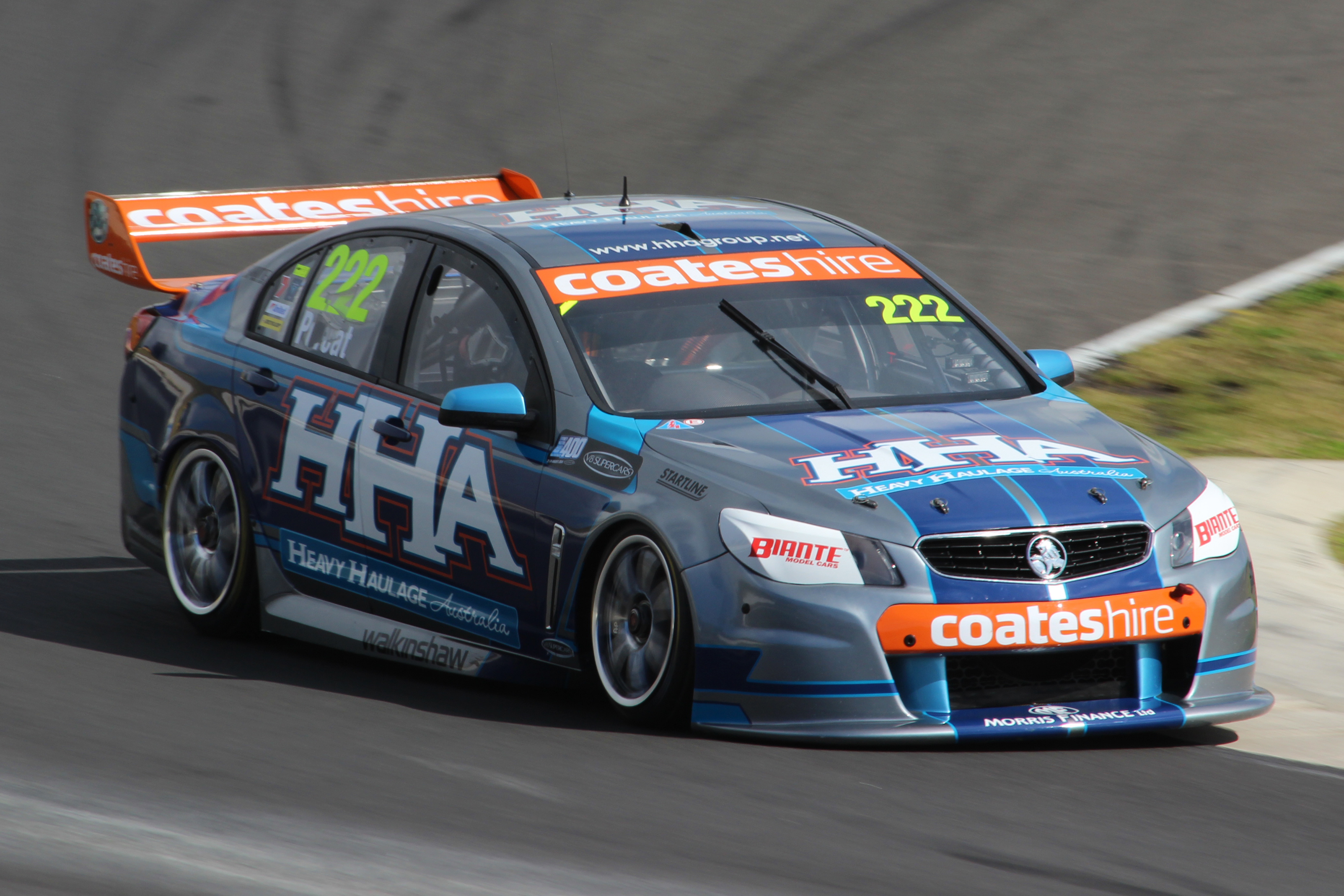
- Manufacturer: Holden
- Team Principal: James Rosenberg
- Team Manager: Adrian Burgess
- Race Drivers: 222. Nick Percat
- Chassis: Holden VF Commodore
- Debut: 1995
- Drivers' Championships: 0
- Round wins: 0
- Pole positions: 1
- 2014 position: 11th (1,946 points)

James Rosenberg Racing was a V8 Supercar racing team owned by South Australian agricultural business identity, James Rosenberg. The team was reformed in 2010 with Tim Slade as the team's driver after a toe-in-the water year working with Paul Morris Motorsport in 2009.

== Biography ==
The team began in the 1980s as a Sports Sedan team with Rosenberg himself as driver. In 1995 the opportunity presented to step into the Australian Touring Car Championship with the 1993 Bathurst winning Perkins Engineering Holden VP Commodore for Formula Holden front-runner Mark Poole. The team was considered a second-tier team within the ranks of the privateers, capable of reaching the top ten results on occasion. In mid-1999 the team upgraded to an ex Holden Racing Team VT Commodore before folding part way through the 2000 season.

Rosenberg became involved in the running of Australian Formula 3, and the emerging career of Tim Slade, assisting him into the Paul Morris Motorsport team for 2009. Rosenberg announced the reformation of the team in December 2009 after acquiring a Racing Entitlement Contract from Paul Cruickshank Racing, to race a Stone Brothers Racing Ford FG Falcon for Tim Slade in 2010. This arrangement continued in 2011 and 2012 with a few podium positions. Between 2010 and 2012, The team shared a pit boom with Rod Nash Racing's entry.

As part of the sale of Stone Brothers Racing to Erebus Motorsport, James Rosenberg Racing campaigned a Mercedes-Benz E63 AMG in 2013. The team struggled in 2013, with Slade recording just 4 Top 10 race finishes, at season's end Slade was 22nd in points. In 2013, the team shared a pit boom with Britek Motorsport.

In November 2013 James Rosenberg announced he would be taking his REC to operate a car out of the Walkinshaw Racing operation in 2014 with Nick Percat signed to drive.

The team closed at the end of 2014, with the REC returned to V8 Supercars.

== Results ==
=== Complete Bathurst 1000 results ===
Year	No.	Car	Drivers	Position	Laps
1995	38	Holden Commodore VP	(Australia) Mark Poole (Australia) Ed Ordynski (Australia) Bernie Stack	DNF	136
1996	38	Holden Commodore VR	(Australia) Mark Poole (Australia) Peter Gazzard	20th	141
1997	38	Holden Commodore VS	(Australia) Mark Poole (Australia) Tony Scott	DNF	74
1998	38	Holden Commodore VS	(Australia) Mark Poole (Australia) Tony Scott	DNF	34
1999	66	Holden Commodore VT	(Australia) Mark Poole (Australia) Tony Scott	15th	157
2010	47	Ford Falcon FG	(Australia) Tim Slade (Australia) Jack Perkins	18th	161
2011	47	Ford Falcon FG	(Australia) Tim Slade (New Zealand) Daniel Gaunt	12th	161
2012	47	Ford Falcon FG	(Australia) Tim Slade (Australia) Andrew Thompson	7th	161
2013	47	Mercedes-Benz E63 AMG	(Australia) Tim Slade (Australia) Andrew Thompson	26th	137
2014	222	Holden Commodore VF	(Australia) Nick Percat (United Kingdom) Oliver Gavin	3rd	161

== Gallery ==
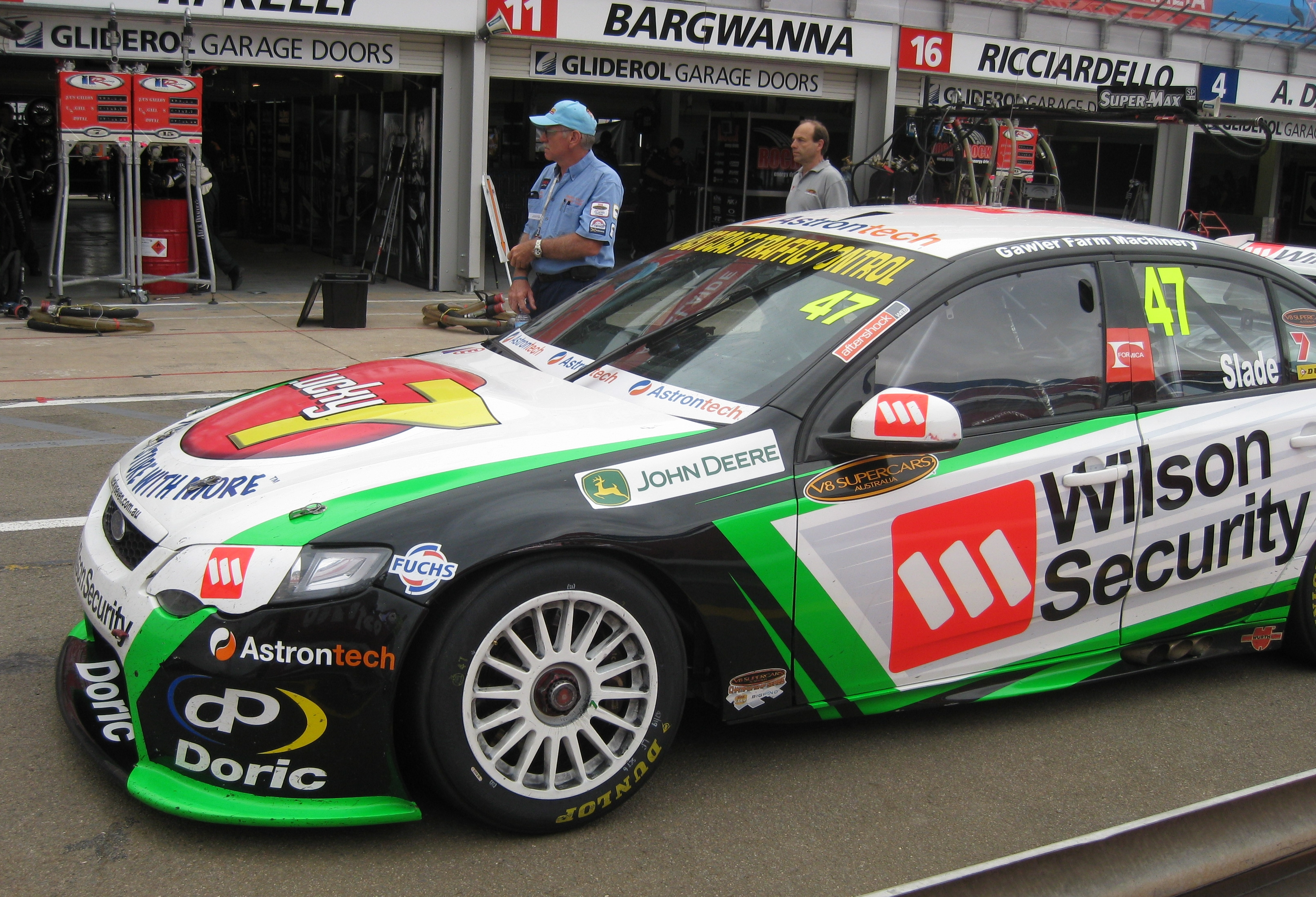
The Ford FG Falcon of Tim Slade at the 2010 Clipsal 500.

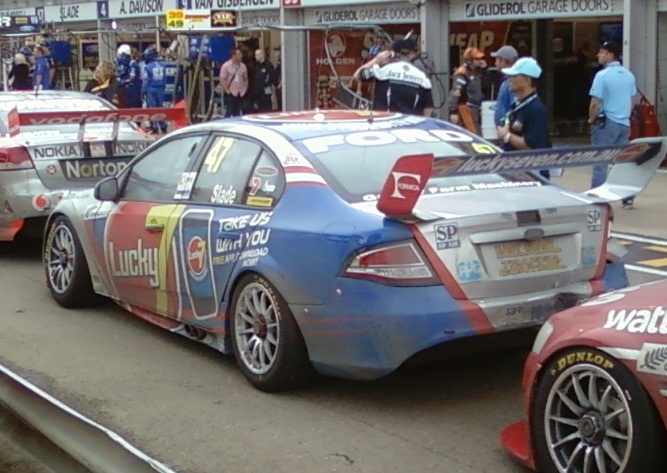
The Ford FG Falcon of Tim Slade at the 2011 Clipsal 500.

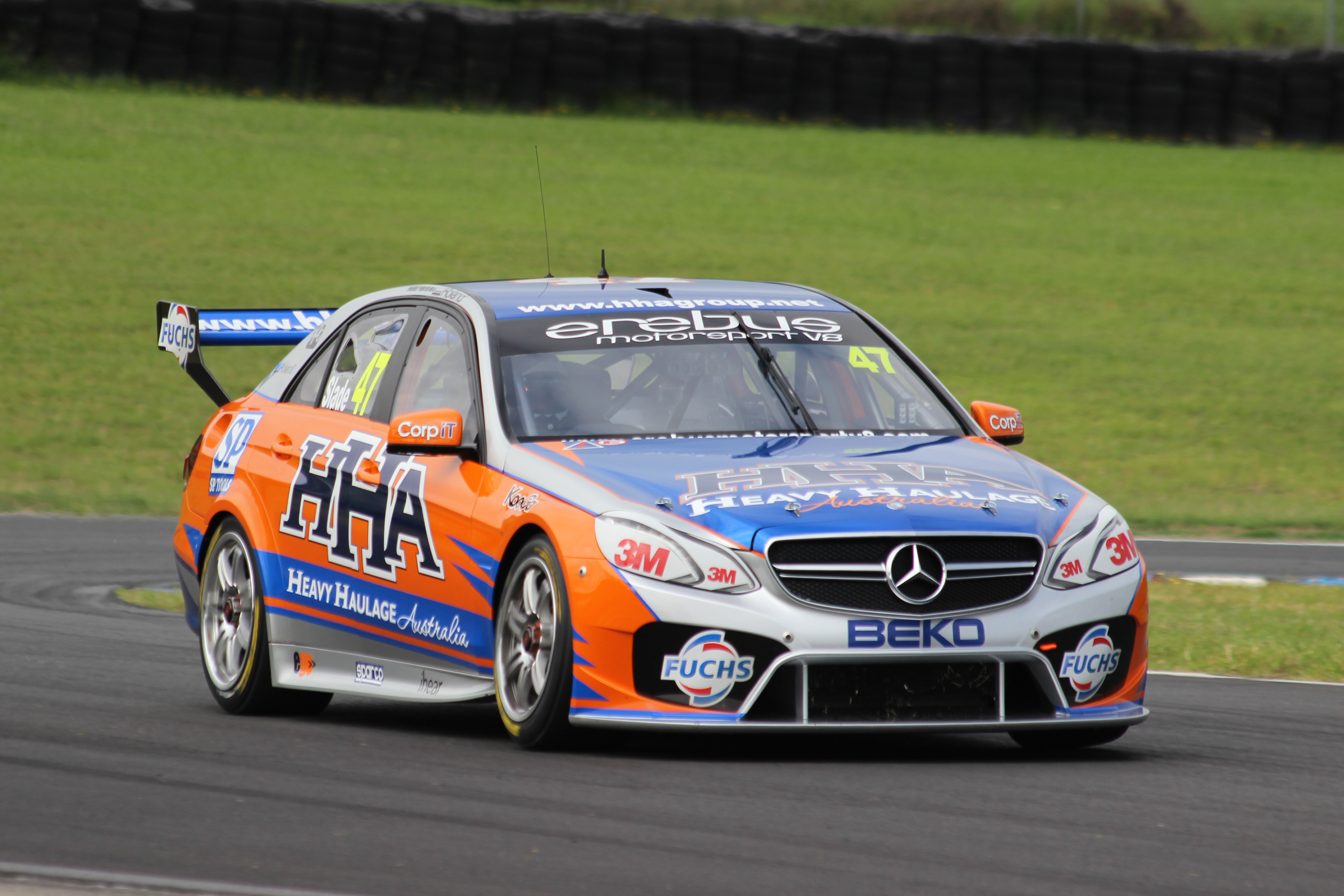
The Mercedes-Benz E63 AMG of Tim Slade at the Sydney Motorsport Park test day in 2013.

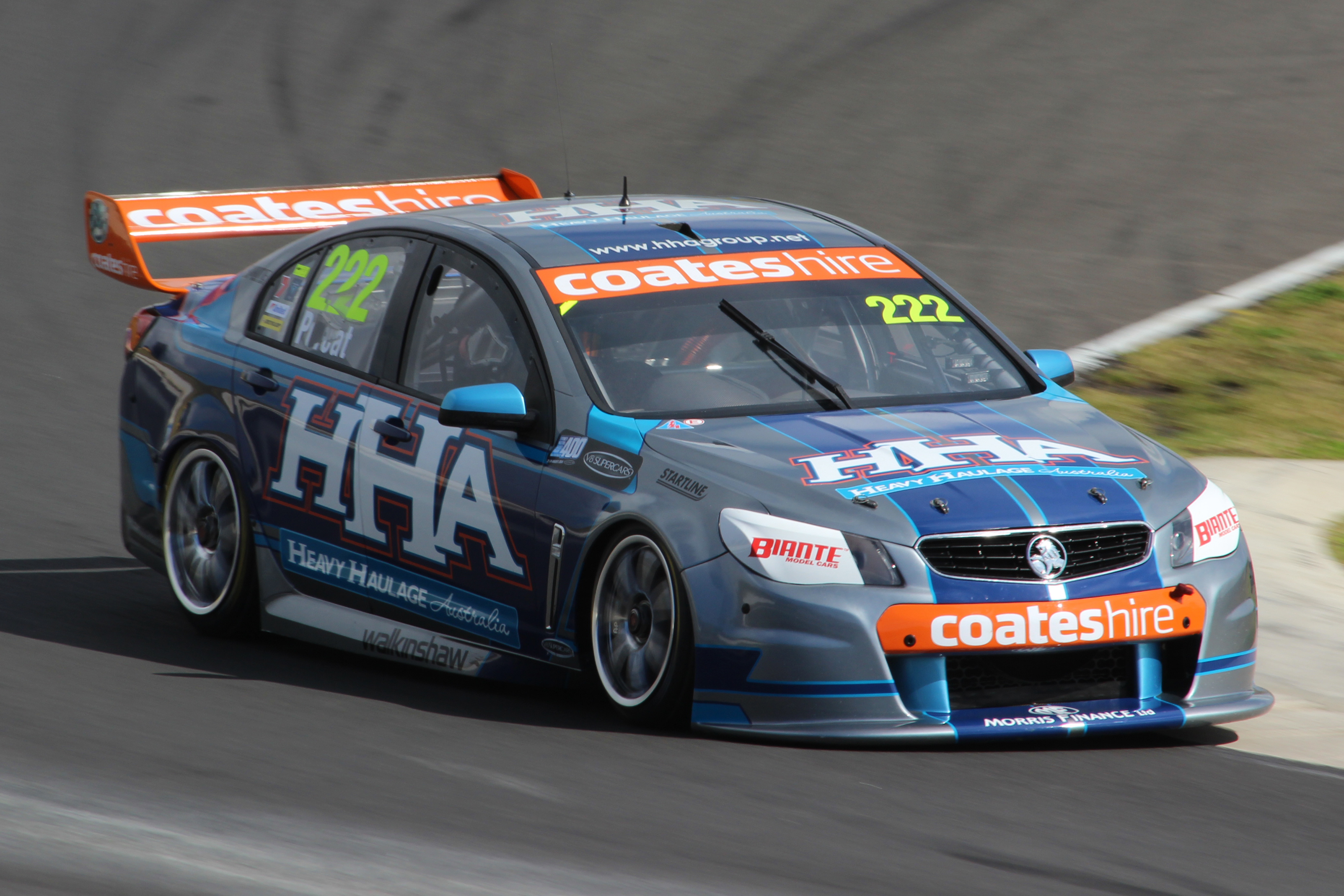
The Holden VF Commodore of Nick Percat at the 2014 Sydney Motorsport Park 400.
