= 2016 Adelaide 500 =

Motor racing event for V8 Supercars in Adelaide, South Australia

(South Australia) 2016 Clipsal 500 Adelaide
Event Information
- Round 1 of 14 in the 2016 International V8 Supercars Championship
- Date: 4–6 March 2016
- Location: Adelaide, South Australia
- Venue: Adelaide Street Circuit
- Weather: Friday: fine Saturday: fine Sunday: fine morning, afternoon thunderstorms

Results
Race 1
Distance	39 laps	125 km
Pole position	Scott Pye; DJR Team Penske	1:20.0168
Winner	Jamie Whincup; Triple Eight Race Engineering	56:43.1447
Race 2
Distance	39 laps	125 km
Pole position	Chaz Mostert; Rod Nash Racing	1:20.3724
Winner	James Courtney; Holden Racing Team	59:37.1268
Race 3
Distance	48 laps	155 km
Pole position	Fabian Coulthard; DJR Team Penske	1:21.3006
Winner	Nick Percat; Lucas Dumbrell Motorsport	1:49:03.6598

The 2016 Clipsal 500 Adelaide was a motor racing event for V8 Supercars, held on the weekend of 4 to 6 March 2016. The event was held at the Adelaide Street Circuit in Adelaide, South Australia, and consisted of two races of 125 kilometres and one race of 155 km in length. It was the first event of fourteen in the 2016 International V8 Supercars Championship and hosted Races 1, 2 and 3 of the season. The event was the 18th running of the Adelaide 500.

The three races were won by Jamie Whincup, James Courtney and Nick Percat respectively. Percat's win was the first for Lucas Dumbrell Motorsport and came in the midst of controversy surrounding pit stop regulations. The third race was also affected by adverse weather conditions, which caused the race to be red flagged, and eventually finished 30 laps short of the scheduled length. Michael Caruso, despite not winning a race, left the event with the championship lead.

== Report ==
=== Background ===
The event saw two drivers make their full-time driving debut in the series: Cam Waters, the winner of the 2015 V8 Supercars Dunlop Series, competed for Prodrive Racing Australia, replacing Chaz Mostert who was moved into the customer Rod Nash Racing car; and Aaren Russell, another former Dunlop Series driver, who drove for Erebus Motorsport. The event was Mostert's first since the 2015 Supercheap Auto Bathurst 1000, where injuries sustained in a major crash in qualifying forced him to miss the final four events of 2015. Nick Percat also returned from injury, having missed the final two events of 2015 with a foot infection.

Erebus Motorsport replaced their Mercedes-Benz E63 AMGs with a pair of Holden VF Commodores, reducing the number of manufacturers in the field from five to four. The field itself expanded to 26 cars, up from 25 in 2015, following Triple Eight Race Engineering's purchase of a Racing Entitlements Contract from V8 Supercars management.

=== Practice ===
The first of three practice sessions was held on Friday morning and was 40 minutes in duration. Scott McLaughlin set the fastest lap time ahead of defending event winner James Courtney and 2015 series runner-up Craig Lowndes. The session was mostly trouble-free, with the only incidents seeing Tim Slade run down the escape road at Turn 4 and Jamie Whincup spin at Turn 9. A second 40-minute session was held on Friday afternoon, with McLaughlin again setting the fastest time. All drivers used the soft compound tyre in this session, with McLaughlin's time of 1:19.6977 being a new practice record. Triple Eight Race Engineering teammates Whincup and Shane van Gisbergen were second and third.

The final practice session was a 20-minute session held on Saturday morning. Michael Caruso was quickest ahead of James Courtney and David Reynolds, with teams focussing on race setup ahead of the two races in the afternoon.

Practice summary
Session	Day	Fastest lap				
Session	Day	No.	Driver	Team	Car	Time
Practice 1	Friday	33	(New Zealand) Scott McLaughlin	Garry Rogers Motorsport	Volvo S60	1:20.7880
Practice 2	Friday	33	(New Zealand) Scott McLaughlin	Garry Rogers Motorsport	Volvo S60	1:19.6977
Practice 3	Saturday	23	(Australia) Michael Caruso	Nissan Motorsport	Nissan Altima L33	1:20.2041

=== Qualifying – Races 1 and 2 ===
Two ten-minute qualifying sessions were held on Friday evening which set the grid for the two 125 km races on Saturday. Drivers were allowed to use only the soft tyre in the first session and only the hard tyre in the second. Scott Pye took his first career pole position in the first session ahead of Whincup and McLaughlin. Reigning champion Mark Winterbottom was fourth with Courtney in fifth. Russell was investigated for impeding Whincup at the final corner. Russell was going slowly, preparing to start a fast lap, while Whincup was at the end of a fast lap and lost time trying to avoid the rear of Russell's car. A similar situation led to a major accident involving Jonathon Webb and Greg Murphy at the 2012 Clipsal 500 Adelaide.

Mostert, after qualifying only 12th in the first session, set the fastest time in the second session to take pole position for the second race. Whincup and McLaughlin were again second and third, with Courtney and Van Gisbergen rounding out the top five. Pye was seventh fastest. Mostert was surprised at taking pole position on his return to the series, saying: "I’ll still be up the pointy end which is great ... I’m a bit lost for words, I can’t really describe it. It’s kind of like my first pole all over again."

=== Race 1 ===
Race 1 took place on Saturday afternoon and required drivers to use soft tyres only. Whincup took the lead at the start with Pye assuming second position ahead of McLaughlin, Winterbottom, Courtney and Van Gisbergen. Lee Holdsworth was spun at Turn 6 on lap 1 and fell to the back of the field. Whincup built a lead of over five seconds in the opening laps, with Pye maintaining second place under pressure from McLaughlin. The first pit stops began taking place on lap 5, with Lowndes and Mostert coming in on this lap to take on fuel and have tyres changed. The safety car was called on lap 14 after Slade went down the escape road at Turn 9 and was unable to select reverse gear.

After all drivers had made their pit stop, Whincup continued to lead with Courtney moving up to second place ahead of Van Gisbergen and McLaughlin. Pye had fallen down the order after losing time in his pit stop, with the car being dropped from the jacks with the left-rear wheel not fastened properly. The resulting delay in jacking the car back up and tightening the wheel nut dropped him to twelfth place. The safety car returned to the pits on lap 18 and Whincup again built a gap over second place, leading all the way to the finish. Courtney finished second ahead of Van Gisbergen and McLaughlin, while Garth Tander was fifth after passing Winterbottom, Lowndes and Todd Kelly following the safety car period.

=== Race 2 ===
Race 2 also took place on Saturday afternoon but was run on hard tyres. Percat was unable to start the race due to an electrical problem on the parade lap. Mostert led the opening laps from pole position with Courtney moving into second place after making a good start from fourth on the grid. The safety car was called on lap 2 when Chris Pither crashed at Turn 8. Racing resumed on lap 7 with Mostert leading Courtney, Whincup, McLaughlin and Van Gisbergen. Drivers began making their pit stops at the end of lap 9, with several drivers pitting at this time.

Mostert, Courtney, Whincup and McLaughlin maintained their positions after all drivers had completed their pit stops, while Van Gisbergen dropped back after a slow stop. Tander also endured a difficult pit stop, with the car stalling as he left the pit bay and not being able to be restarted for a number of laps. When Tander eventually rejoined the circuit, he was hit by Tim Blanchard at the Senna Chicane. Blanchard's car was damaged and the resulting repairs left him six laps off the lead. A second safety car period was needed to clean up debris from the incident. Courtney took the lead at Turn 9 on lap 21, with Whincup taking second as Mostert was pushed wide on the exit of the corner. Courtney and Whincup then battled to the end of the race, Courtney emerging as the winner by six tenths of a second. Mostert held on to complete the podium while McLaughlin was fourth ahead of a recovering Shane van Gisbergen.

=== Qualifying – Race 3 ===
Qualifying for Race 3 consisted of a 20-minute qualifying session held on Sunday morning followed by a top ten shootout on Sunday afternoon. Only 25 cars took part in the session, with Pither's crash in Race 2 doing enough damage to rule the car out of Race 3. The qualifying session was stopped for several minutes when a power steering line on James Moffat's car broke and left power steering fluid on the track at the final corner which needed to be cleaned up. McLaughlin was fastest, setting a time of 1:20.4055 at the end of the session. McLaughlin, Mostert, Whincup, Van Gisbergen, Fabian Coulthard, Rick Kelly, Pye, Winterbottom, Courtney and Waters progressed to the top ten shootout as a result of being the fastest ten drivers.

The top ten shootout saw each of the ten drivers complete one flying lap each, in reverse order of their qualifying positions. Waters, in his first top ten shootout, was the first driver out and set a time of 1:22.6300. Courtney triggered the kerb sensor at Turn 2 on his lap, which led to his lap time being invalidated and leaving him tenth on the grid. Winterbottom beat Waters' time by a quarter of a second before Rick Kelly bettered Winterbottom's time by over half a second. Coulthard was the sixth driver to run and set a time of 1:21.3006, another half a second faster than Kelly, which would be fast enough to secure pole position. Of the remaining runners, Mostert got closest to Coulthard's time with 1:21.3071.

=== Race 3 ===
Race 3 took place on Sunday afternoon and was scheduled to run for 78 laps, a distance of 250 km. A rain storm passed over the circuit just prior to the start of the race, prompting the majority of the drivers in the field to change from slick to wet weather tyres on the grid. Winterbottom, one of several drivers to remain on slick tyres, almost hit the wall at Turn 8 on the warm-up lap. Along with the other drivers on slick tyres, he pitted at the end of the warm-up lap to change to wet weather tyres. The race start was delayed, however, as Russell's car stopped on the warm-up lap and had to be collected. With the rain getting heavier, the race was started under the control of the safety car, which remained on the track for the first six laps to allow drivers to get a feel for the conditions. With the regulations requiring each car to take on 140 litres of fuel during the race, some drivers took advantage of the safety car period to fulfil part of the requirement. This caused controversy, as there was confusion as to whether or not the race had actually started, with some teams believing that the official start of the race would not occur until the safety car returned to the pit lane. V8 Supercar regulations state that a race may be started under the safety car in extreme circumstances, such as poor weather, and that the official start of the race is when the safety car returns to the pit lane. However, this is only the case when the warm-up lap has not been completed. As it had been completed in this case, the race was deemed to have started when the safety car led the field away from the grid.

The safety car returned to the pits on lap 7, with Coulthard in the lead ahead of Mostert and Van Gisbergen. Whincup was spun by Tander, while Van Gisbergen took the lead from Coulthard before running wide at Turn 9 and handing the lead back. At the same time, Rick Kelly was spun by Mostert. Van Gisbergen regained the lead a couple of laps later, with Courtney following him through into second place. Van Gisbergen then ran wide at Turn 4, giving the lead to Courtney. The two made contact at Turn 9, allowing Lowndes through to the lead. With the rain stopped and the track drying out, drivers began to pit to change back to slick tyres, led by Jason Bright on lap 18. Lowndes continued to lead ahead of Courtney and Mostert. Mostert hit the wall at Turn 8 on lap 28, spinning into the escape road at Turn 9 and retiring from the race. On the same lap, drivers started to change back to wet tyres as rain had started falling again.

Courtney led until lap 36, when he aquaplaned going into Turn 8 and hit the wall, damaging the car and forcing him to return to the pits for repairs. The safety car was deployed due to the worsening conditions, with McLaughlin leading Davison and Lowndes. As the conditions continued to deteriorate, and a marshal was affected by lightning, the race was suspended on lap 42, with all cars returning to the pit lane. With the majority of the field having not taken on the required 140 L of fuel, questions were raised on how this would affect the result if the race was not restarted. The rules stated that any car that had not fulfilled the fuel requirement would be given a time penalty following the race, but it was unclear as to whether or not this applied to a shortened race. The race restarted at 5:10 pm with five minutes of its allocated time remaining, and drivers who had not met the fuel requirement, with the exception of Coulthard and Pye, pitted to take on the remaining fuel. This left Percat to take victory, his first solo win in the series, having completed 48 laps, ahead of Coulthard, Pye, Caruso and Tander. However, Coulthard and Pye were immediately given a 30-second time penalty for not complying with the fuel regulations, dropping them to 14th and 15th places respectively.

The result left Caruso with the championship lead by 15 points ahead of Whincup and 20 ahead of Tander. Whincup was third, with Van Gisbergen and McLaughin completing the top five.

==== Post-race ====
The time penalties for Coulthard and Pye were extended to 60 seconds following the race, dropping them to 16th and 17th. The same penalty was also applied to Courtney, Slade and Moffat, but this did not affect the final result. Pye was disappointed by the situation, saying: "It was physically impossible for us to fit it in because of the amount we chose to start with. That race, I don’t know how you can count it. It was a non-event." Holden Racing Team team principal Adrian Burgess questioned the application of the minimum fuel drop rule in a rain-affected race, saying: "Do we really need the fuel drop when we have a race like that? We probably don’t. Just let the guys up the front race hard in wet conditions."

Drivers described the race as one of the most chaotic they had ever competed in, with Lowndes describing the race as "bizarre" and McLaughlin saying: "It was the craziest race I’ve ever been a part of." Percat thanked his team Lucas Dumbrell Motorsport for the win, which was the team's first, saying: "This is an unbelievable moment in my career." Tander and Mostert were both penalised 15 championship points for causing incidents in the race. Along with the increased penalties for Pye and Coulthard, this dropped Tander to fifth place in the championship, with Van Gisbergen and McLaughlin moving into third and fourth, 25 and 33 points behind Caruso respectively.

Following the controversy over the start of the race, V8 Supercars decided to review race start procedures with slight modifications applying starting the following round.

== Results ==
=== Race 1 ===
==== Qualifying ====
Pos.	No.	Driver	Team	Car	Time
1	17	(Australia) Scott Pye	DJR Team Penske	Ford FG X Falcon	1:20.0168
2	88	(Australia) Jamie Whincup	Triple Eight Race Engineering	Holden VF Commodore	1:20.1094
3	33	(New Zealand) Scott McLaughlin	Garry Rogers Motorsport	Volvo S60	1:20.1505
4	1	(Australia) Mark Winterbottom	Prodrive Racing Australia	Ford FG X Falcon	1:20.1622
5	22	(Australia) James Courtney	Holden Racing Team	Holden VF Commodore	1:20.2364
6	97	(New Zealand) Shane van Gisbergen	Triple Eight Race Engineering	Holden VF Commodore	1:20.2752
7	7	(Australia) Todd Kelly	Nissan Motorsport	Nissan Altima L33	1:20.2839
8	15	(Australia) Rick Kelly	Nissan Motorsport	Nissan Altima L33	1:20.3933
9	2	(Australia) Garth Tander	Holden Racing Team	Holden VF Commodore	1:20.4067
10	19	(Australia) Will Davison	Tekno Autosports	Holden VF Commodore	1:20.4089
11	888	(Australia) Craig Lowndes	Triple Eight Race Engineering	Holden VF Commodore	1:20.4142
12	55	(Australia) Chaz Mostert	Rod Nash Racing	Ford FG X Falcon	1:20.4377
13	12	(New Zealand) Fabian Coulthard	DJR Team Penske	Ford FG X Falcon	1:20.4661
14	23	(Australia) Michael Caruso	Nissan Motorsport	Nissan Altima L33	1:20.5147
15	6	(Australia) Cam Waters	Prodrive Racing Australia	Ford FG X Falcon	1:20.5659
16	9	(Australia) David Reynolds	Erebus Motorsport	Holden VF Commodore	1:20.5716
17	8	(Australia) Jason Bright	Brad Jones Racing	Holden VF Commodore	1:20.5879
18	14	(Australia) Tim Slade	Brad Jones Racing	Holden VF Commodore	1:20.6324
19	18	(Australia) Lee Holdsworth	Team 18	Holden VF Commodore	1:20.6804
20	34	(Australia) James Moffat	Garry Rogers Motorsport	Volvo S60	1:20.8847
21	222	(Australia) Nick Percat	Lucas Dumbrell Motorsport	Holden VF Commodore	1:20.9523
22	111	(New Zealand) Chris Pither	Super Black Racing	Ford FG X Falcon	1:20.9544
23	96	(Australia) Dale Wood	Nissan Motorsport	Nissan Altima L33	1:21.1744
24	3	(New Zealand) Andre Heimgartner	Lucas Dumbrell Motorsport	Holden VF Commodore	1:21.3610
25	21	(Australia) Tim Blanchard	Britek Motorsport	Holden VF Commodore	1:21.4342
26	4	(Australia) Aaren Russell	Erebus Motorsport	Holden VF Commodore	1:21.5897

==== Race ====
Pos.	No.	Driver	Team	Car	Laps	Time/retired	Grid	Points
1	88	(Australia) Jamie Whincup	Triple Eight Race Engineering	Holden VF Commodore	39	56:43.1447	2	75
2	22	(Australia) James Courtney	Holden Racing Team	Holden VF Commodore	39	+3.9 s	5	69
3	97	(New Zealand) Shane van Gisbergen	Triple Eight Race Engineering	Holden VF Commodore	39	+7.6 s	6	64
4	33	(New Zealand) Scott McLaughlin	Garry Rogers Motorsport	Volvo S60	39	+8.5 s	3	60
5	2	(Australia) Garth Tander	Holden Racing Team	Holden VF Commodore	39	+11.1 s	9	55
6	7	(Australia) Todd Kelly	Nissan Motorsport	Nissan Altima L33	39	+14.5 s	7	51
7	888	(Australia) Craig Lowndes	Triple Eight Race Engineering	Holden VF Commodore	39	+18.1 s	11	48
8	1	(Australia) Mark Winterbottom	Prodrive Racing Australia	Ford FG X Falcon	39	+18.8 s	4	45
9	15	(Australia) Rick Kelly	Nissan Motorsport	Nissan Altima L33	39	+19.4 s	8	42
10	12	(New Zealand) Fabian Coulthard	DJR Team Penske	Ford FG X Falcon	39	+21.1 s	13	39
11	19	(Australia) Will Davison	Tekno Autosports	Holden VF Commodore	39	+21.4 s	10	36
12	17	(Australia) Scott Pye	DJR Team Penske	Ford FG X Falcon	39	+22.8 s	1	34
13	23	(Australia) Michael Caruso	Nissan Motorsport	Nissan Altima L33	39	+29.2 s	14	33
14	9	(Australia) David Reynolds	Erebus Motorsport	Holden VF Commodore	39	+30.0 s	16	31
15	6	(Australia) Cam Waters	Prodrive Racing Australia	Ford FG X Falcon	39	+30.6 s	15	30
16	55	(Australia) Chaz Mostert	Rod Nash Racing	Ford FG X Falcon	39	+33.8 s	12	28
17	34	(Australia) James Moffat	Garry Rogers Motorsport	Volvo S60	39	+34.4 s	20	27
18	111	(New Zealand) Chris Pither	Super Black Racing	Ford FG X Falcon	39	+35.9 s	22	25
19	8	(Australia) Jason Bright	Brad Jones Racing	Holden VF Commodore	39	+39.2 s	17	24
20	96	(Australia) Dale Wood	Nissan Motorsport	Nissan Altima L33	39	+40.0 s	23	22
21	222	(Australia) Nick Percat	Lucas Dumbrell Motorsport	Holden VF Commodore	39	+40.3 s	21	21
22	3	(New Zealand) Andre Heimgartner	Lucas Dumbrell Motorsport	Holden VF Commodore	39	+42.0 s	24	19
23	18	(Australia) Lee Holdsworth	Team 18	Holden VF Commodore	39	+44.4 s	19	18
24	21	(Australia) Tim Blanchard	Britek Motorsport	Holden VF Commodore	39	+47.0 s	25	16
25	4	(Australia) Aaren Russell	Erebus Motorsport	Holden VF Commodore	39	+50.6 s	26	15
Ret	14	(Australia) Tim Slade	Brad Jones Racing	Holden VF Commodore	12	Stopped on track	18	

=== Race 2 ===
==== Qualifying ====
Pos.	No.	Driver	Team	Car	Time
1	55	(Australia) Chaz Mostert	Rod Nash Racing	Ford FG X Falcon	1:20.3724
2	88	(Australia) Jamie Whincup	Triple Eight Race Engineering	Holden VF Commodore	1:20.4552
3	33	(New Zealand) Scott McLaughlin	Garry Rogers Motorsport	Volvo S60	1:20.4834
4	22	(Australia) James Courtney	Holden Racing Team	Holden VF Commodore	1:20.5612
5	97	(New Zealand) Shane van Gisbergen	Triple Eight Race Engineering	Holden VF Commodore	1:20.6082
6	23	(Australia) Michael Caruso	Nissan Motorsport	Nissan Altima L33	1:20.6425
7	17	(Australia) Scott Pye	DJR Team Penske	Ford FG X Falcon	1:20.6754
8	8	(Australia) Jason Bright	Brad Jones Racing	Holden VF Commodore	1:20.8206
9	888	(Australia) Craig Lowndes	Triple Eight Race Engineering	Holden VF Commodore	1:20.9113
10	1	(Australia) Mark Winterbottom	Prodrive Racing Australia	Ford FG X Falcon	1:20.9135
11	19	(Australia) Will Davison	Tekno Autosports	Holden VF Commodore	1:20.9318
12	6	(Australia) Cam Waters	Prodrive Racing Australia	Ford FG X Falcon	1:20.9545
13	14	(Australia) Tim Slade	Brad Jones Racing	Holden VF Commodore	1:21.0690
14	15	(Australia) Rick Kelly	Nissan Motorsport	Nissan Altima L33	1:21.0699
15	18	(Australia) Lee Holdsworth	Team 18	Holden VF Commodore	1:21.0770
16	21	(Australia) Tim Blanchard	Britek Motorsport	Holden VF Commodore	1:21.0795
17	12	(New Zealand) Fabian Coulthard	DJR Team Penske	Ford FG X Falcon	1:21.1023
18	2	(Australia) Garth Tander	Holden Racing Team	Holden VF Commodore	1:21.1433
19	222	(Australia) Nick Percat	Lucas Dumbrell Motorsport	Holden VF Commodore	1:21.1507
20	7	(Australia) Todd Kelly	Nissan Motorsport	Nissan Altima L33	1:21.1865
21	34	(Australia) James Moffat	Garry Rogers Motorsport	Volvo S60	1:21.3525
22	9	(Australia) David Reynolds	Erebus Motorsport	Holden VF Commodore	1:21.3553
23	111	(New Zealand) Chris Pither	Super Black Racing	Ford FG X Falcon	1:21.7035
24	3	(New Zealand) Andre Heimgartner	Lucas Dumbrell Motorsport	Holden VF Commodore	1:21.7291
25	96	(Australia) Dale Wood	Nissan Motorsport	Nissan Altima L33	1:21.8002
26	4	(Australia) Aaren Russell	Erebus Motorsport	Holden VF Commodore	1:22.0507

==== Race ====
Pos.	No.	Driver	Team	Car	Laps	Time/retired	Grid	Points
1	22	(Australia) James Courtney	Holden Racing Team	Holden VF Commodore	39	59:37.1268	4	75
2	88	(Australia) Jamie Whincup	Triple Eight Race Engineering	Holden VF Commodore	39	+0.6 s	2	69
3	55	(Australia) Chaz Mostert	Rod Nash Racing	Ford FG X Falcon	39	+2.5 s	1	64
4	33	(New Zealand) Scott McLaughlin	Garry Rogers Motorsport	Volvo S60	39	+3.2 s	3	60
5	97	(New Zealand) Shane van Gisbergen	Triple Eight Race Engineering	Holden VF Commodore	39	+6.3 s	5	55
6	23	(Australia) Michael Caruso	Nissan Motorsport	Nissan Altima L33	39	+12.7 s	6	51
7	17	(Australia) Scott Pye	DJR Team Penske	Ford FG X Falcon	39	+16.3 s	7	48
8	8	(Australia) Jason Bright	Brad Jones Racing	Holden VF Commodore	39	+17.1 s	8	45
9	19	(Australia) Will Davison	Tekno Autosports	Holden VF Commodore	39	+18.7 s	11	42
10	888	(Australia) Craig Lowndes	Triple Eight Race Engineering	Holden VF Commodore	39	+20.5 s	9	39
11	1	(Australia) Mark Winterbottom	Prodrive Racing Australia	Ford FG X Falcon	39	+21.5 s	10	36
12	6	(Australia) Cam Waters	Prodrive Racing Australia	Ford FG X Falcon	39	+22.3 s	12	34
13	15	(Australia) Rick Kelly	Nissan Motorsport	Nissan Altima L33	39	+23.9 s	14	33
14	12	(New Zealand) Fabian Coulthard	DJR Team Penske	Ford FG X Falcon	39	+25.0 s	17	31
15	34	(Australia) James Moffat	Garry Rogers Motorsport	Volvo S60	39	+26.7 s	21	30
16	7	(Australia) Todd Kelly	Nissan Motorsport	Nissan Altima L33	39	+27.1 s	20	28
17	14	(Australia) Tim Slade	Brad Jones Racing	Holden VF Commodore	39	+27.8 s	13	27
18	96	(Australia) Dale Wood	Nissan Motorsport	Nissan Altima L33	39	+28.9 s	25	25
19	9	(Australia) David Reynolds	Erebus Motorsport	Holden VF Commodore	39	+29.8 s	22	24
20	3	(New Zealand) Andre Heimgartner	Lucas Dumbrell Motorsport	Holden VF Commodore	39	+31.3 s	24	22
21	18	(Australia) Lee Holdsworth	Team 18	Holden VF Commodore	39	+32.3 s	15	21
22	4	(Australia) Aaren Russell	Erebus Motorsport	Holden VF Commodore	39	+36.8 s	26	19
23	2	(Australia) Garth Tander	Holden Racing Team	Holden VF Commodore	35	+4 laps	18	18
24	21	(Australia) Tim Blanchard	Britek Motorsport	Holden VF Commodore	33	+6 laps	16	16
Ret	111	(New Zealand) Chris Pither	Super Black Racing	Ford FG X Falcon	1	Accident	23	
DNS	222	(Australia) Nick Percat	Lucas Dumbrell Motorsport	Holden VF Commodore		Electrical		

=== Race 3 ===
==== Qualifying ====
Pos.	No.	Driver	Team	Car	Time
1	33	(New Zealand) Scott McLaughlin	Garry Rogers Motorsport	Volvo S60	1:20.4055
2	55	(Australia) Chaz Mostert	Rod Nash Racing	Ford FG X Falcon	1:20.4622
3	88	(Australia) Jamie Whincup	Triple Eight Race Engineering	Holden VF Commodore	1:20.5746
4	97	(New Zealand) Shane van Gisbergen	Triple Eight Race Engineering	Holden VF Commodore	1:20.6564
5	12	(New Zealand) Fabian Coulthard	DJR Team Penske	Ford FG X Falcon	1:20.7551
6	15	(Australia) Rick Kelly	Nissan Motorsport	Nissan Altima L33	1:20.8131
7	17	(Australia) Scott Pye	DJR Team Penske	Ford FG X Falcon	1:20.8204
8	1	(Australia) Mark Winterbottom	Prodrive Racing Australia	Ford FG X Falcon	1:20.8267
9	22	(Australia) James Courtney	Holden Racing Team	Holden VF Commodore	1:20.8581
10	6	(Australia) Cam Waters	Prodrive Racing Australia	Ford FG X Falcon	1:20.8869
11	23	(Australia) Michael Caruso	Nissan Motorsport	Nissan Altima L33	1:20.9215
12	19	(Australia) Will Davison	Tekno Autosports	Holden VF Commodore	1:20.9628
13	2	(Australia) Garth Tander	Holden Racing Team	Holden VF Commodore	1:20.9781
14	7	(Australia) Todd Kelly	Nissan Motorsport	Nissan Altima L33	1:21.0140
15	222	(Australia) Nick Percat	Lucas Dumbrell Motorsport	Holden VF Commodore	1:21.0140
16	14	(Australia) Tim Slade	Brad Jones Racing	Holden VF Commodore	1:21.0250
17	888	(Australia) Craig Lowndes	Triple Eight Race Engineering	Holden VF Commodore	1:21.0670
18	8	(Australia) Jason Bright	Brad Jones Racing	Holden VF Commodore	1:21.0712
19	3	(New Zealand) Andre Heimgartner	Lucas Dumbrell Motorsport	Holden VF Commodore	1:21.1036
20	18	(Australia) Lee Holdsworth	Team 18	Holden VF Commodore	1:21.1565
21	9	(Australia) David Reynolds	Erebus Motorsport	Holden VF Commodore	1:21.1694
22	96	(Australia) Dale Wood	Nissan Motorsport	Nissan Altima L33	1:21.3195
23	21	(Australia) Tim Blanchard	Britek Motorsport	Holden VF Commodore	1:21.3735
24	4	(Australia) Aaren Russell	Erebus Motorsport	Holden VF Commodore	1:21.8199
25	34	(Australia) James Moffat	Garry Rogers Motorsport	Volvo S60	3:23.3981 (Note: Moffat caused a red flag and his fastest lap time was invalidated as a result.)

==== Top Ten Shootout ====
Pos.	No.	Driver	Team	Car	Time
1	12	(New Zealand) Fabian Coulthard	DJR Team Penske	Ford FG X Falcon	1:21.3006
2	55	(Australia) Chaz Mostert	Rod Nash Racing	Ford FG X Falcon	1:21.3071
3	97	(New Zealand) Shane van Gisbergen	Triple Eight Race Engineering	Holden VF Commodore	1:21.3190
4	33	(New Zealand) Scott McLaughlin	Garry Rogers Motorsport	Volvo S60	1:21.4396
5	88	(Australia) Jamie Whincup	Triple Eight Race Engineering	Holden VF Commodore	1:21.5218
6	15	(Australia) Rick Kelly	Nissan Motorsport	Nissan Altima L33	1:21.8616
7	1	(Australia) Mark Winterbottom	Prodrive Racing Australia	Ford FG X Falcon	1:22.3891
8	17	(Australia) Scott Pye	DJR Team Penske	Ford FG X Falcon	1:22.5069
9	6	(Australia) Cam Waters	Prodrive Racing Australia	Ford FG X Falcon	1:22.6300
–	22	(Australia) James Courtney	Holden Racing Team	Holden VF Commodore	No time (Note: Courtney triggered the kerb sensor at Turn 2 and his lap time was invalidated as a result.)

==== Race ====
Pos.	No.	Driver	Team	Car	Laps	Time/retired	Grid	Points
1	222	(Australia) Nick Percat	Lucas Dumbrell Motorsport	Holden VF Commodore	48	1:49:03.6598	15	150
2	23	(Australia) Michael Caruso	Nissan Motorsport	Nissan Altima L33	48	+7.1 s	11	138
3	2	(Australia) Garth Tander	Holden Racing Team	Holden VF Commodore	48	+8.8 s	13	129
4	6	(Australia) Cam Waters	Prodrive Racing Australia	Ford FG X Falcon	48	+11.3 s	9	120
5	9	(Australia) David Reynolds	Erebus Motorsport	Holden VF Commodore	48	+12.9 s	21	111
6	7	(Australia) Todd Kelly	Nissan Motorsport	Nissan Altima L33	48	+13.5 s	14	102
7	15	(Australia) Rick Kelly	Nissan Motorsport	Nissan Altima L33	48	+14.0 s	6	96
8	8	(Australia) Jason Bright	Brad Jones Racing	Holden VF Commodore	48	+15.2 s	18	90
9	1	(Australia) Mark Winterbottom	Prodrive Racing Australia	Ford FG X Falcon	48	+16.4 s	7	84
10	97	(New Zealand) Shane van Gisbergen	Triple Eight Race Engineering	Holden VF Commodore	48	+17.1 s	3	78
11	21	(Australia) Tim Blanchard	Britek Motorsport	Holden VF Commodore	48	+27.1 s	23	72
12	33	(New Zealand) Scott McLaughlin	Garry Rogers Motorsport	Volvo S60	48	+27.3 s	4	69
13	888	(Australia) Craig Lowndes	Triple Eight Race Engineering	Holden VF Commodore	48	+27.7 s	17	66
14	88	(Australia) Jamie Whincup	Triple Eight Race Engineering	Holden VF Commodore	48	+44.8 s	5	63
15	19	(Australia) Will Davison	Tekno Autosports	Holden VF Commodore	48	+59.6 s	12	60
16	12	(New Zealand) Fabian Coulthard	DJR Team Penske	Ford FG X Falcon	48	+1:00.2 (Note: 60-second time penalty for not complying with pit stop regulations.)	1	57
17	17	(Australia) Scott Pye	DJR Team Penske	Ford FG X Falcon	48	+1:06.5	8	54
18	18	(Australia) Lee Holdsworth	Team 18	Holden VF Commodore	48	+1:08.6	20	51
19	3	(New Zealand) Andre Heimgartner	Lucas Dumbrell Motorsport	Holden VF Commodore	45	+3 laps	19	48
20	14	(Australia) Tim Slade	Brad Jones Racing	Holden VF Commodore	43	+5 laps	16	45
21	22	(Australia) James Courtney	Holden Racing Team	Holden VF Commodore	41	+7 laps	10	42
22	34	(Australia) James Moffat	Garry Rogers Motorsport	Volvo S60	38	+10 laps	25	39
Ret	96	(Australia) Dale Wood	Nissan Motorsport	Nissan Altima L33	30		22	
Ret	55	(Australia) Chaz Mostert	Rod Nash Racing	Ford FG X Falcon	27	Accident	2	
DNS	4	(Australia) Aaren Russell	Erebus Motorsport	Holden VF Commodore				

== Championship standings after the event ==
- After Race 3 of 29. Only the top five positions are included for both sets of standings.

Drivers' Championship standings

Pos.	Driver	Points
1	(Australia) Michael Caruso	222
2	(Australia) Jamie Whincup	207
3	(New Zealand) Shane van Gisbergen	197
4	(New Zealand) Scott McLaughlin	189
5	(Australia) Garth Tander	187

Teams' Championship standings

Pos.	Constructor	Points
1	Triple Eight Race Engineering	404
2	Holden Racing Team	388
3	Nissan Motorsport	352
4	Prodrive Racing Australia	349
5	Garry Rogers Motorsport	285
