= 2016 Gold Coast 600 =

Supercar racing event

(Queensland) 2016 Castrol Gold Coast 600
Event Information
- Round 12 of 14 in the 2016 International V8 Supercars Championship
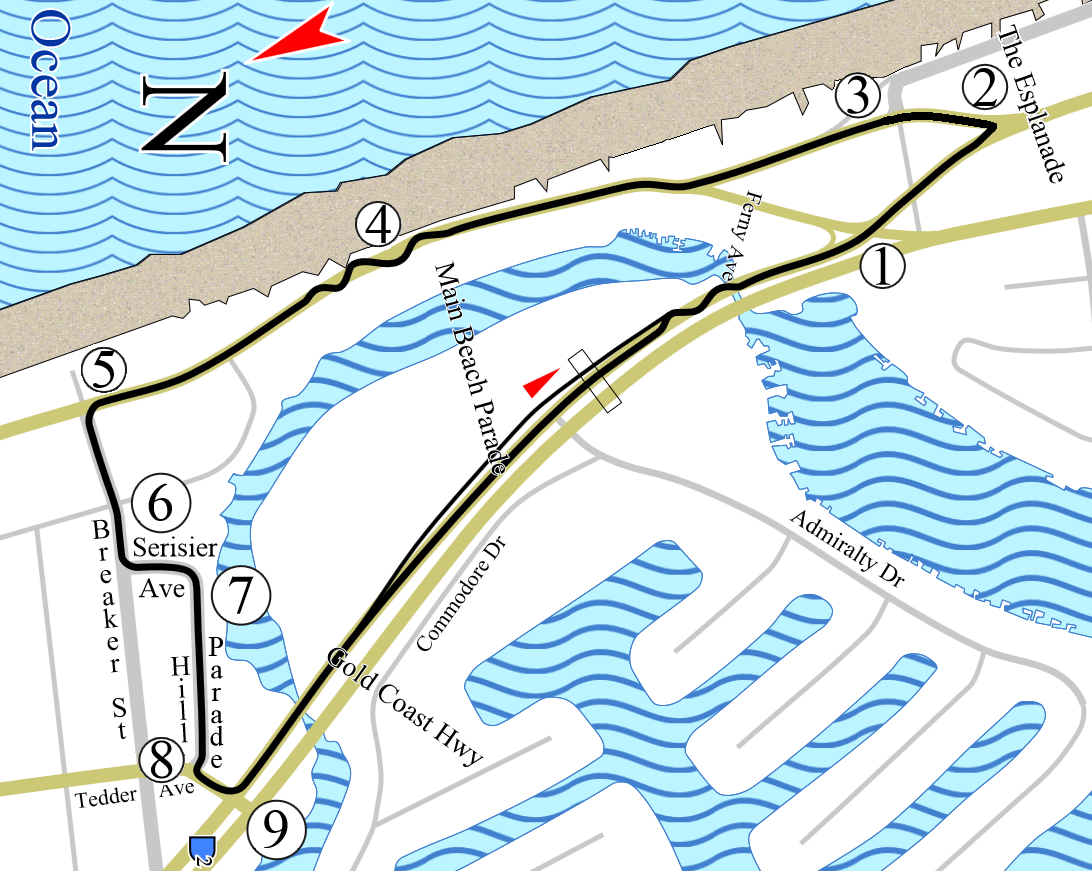
- Date: 21–23 October 2016
- Location: Surfers Paradise, Queensland
- Venue: Surfers Paradise Street Circuit
- Weather: Friday: fine

Results
Race 1
Distance	102 laps	300 km
Pole position	Shane van Gisbergen; Triple Eight Race Engineering	1:10.6544
Winner	Shane van Gisbergen; Alexandre Prémat; Triple Eight Race Engineering	2:21:45.5490
Race 2
Distance	102 laps	300 km
Pole position	Jamie Whincup; Triple Eight Race Engineering	1:10.3169
Winner	Jamie Whincup; Paul Dumbrell; Triple Eight Race Engineering	2:09:10.5096

The 2016 Castrol Gold Coast 600 was a motor racing event for Supercars, held on the weekend of 21 to 23 October 2016. The event was held at the Surfers Paradise Street Circuit in Surfers Paradise, Queensland, Australia, and consisted of two races of 300 kilometres in length. It was the twelfth event of fourteen in the 2016 International V8 Supercars Championship and hosted Races 22 and 23 of the season. It was also the third and final event of the 2016 Pirtek Enduro Cup. It was the seventh running of the Gold Coast 600.

== Report ==
=== Practice ===
Practice summary
Session	Day	Fastest lap				
Session	Day	No.	Driver	Team	Car	Time
Practice 1	Friday	33	(New Zealand) Scott McLaughlin	Garry Rogers Motorsport	Volvo S60	1:11.3244
Practice 2	Friday	17	(Australia) Tony D'Alberto	DJR Team Penske	Ford FG X Falcon	1:11.7753
Practice 3	Friday	97	(New Zealand) Shane van Gisbergen	Triple Eight Race Engineering	Holden VF Commodore	1:10.4206

== Results ==
=== Race 22 ===
==== Qualifying ====
Pos.	No.	Driver	Team	Car	Time
1	97	(New Zealand) Shane van Gisbergen	Triple Eight Race Engineering	Holden VF Commodore	1:10.6544
2	33	(New Zealand) Scott McLaughlin	Garry Rogers Motorsport	Volvo S60	1:10.6841
3	88	(Australia) Jamie Whincup	Triple Eight Race Engineering	Holden VF Commodore	1:10.8823
4	34	(Australia) James Moffat	Garry Rogers Motorsport	Volvo S60	1:10.9004
5	9	(Australia) David Reynolds	Erebus Motorsport	Holden VF Commodore	1:10.9955
6	23	(Australia) Michael Caruso	Nissan Motorsport	Nissan Altima L33	1:11.0156
7	18	(Australia) Lee Holdsworth	Team 18	Holden VF Commodore	1:11.0621
8	19	(Australia) Will Davison	Tekno Autosports	Holden VF Commodore	1:11.0640
9	1	(Australia) Mark Winterbottom	Prodrive Racing Australia	Ford FG X Falcon	1:11.0768
10	55	(Australia) Chaz Mostert	Rod Nash Racing	Ford FG X Falcon	1:11.1153
11	22	(Australia) James Courtney	Holden Racing Team	Holden VF Commodore	1:11.1234
12	888	(Australia) Craig Lowndes	Triple Eight Race Engineering	Holden VF Commodore	1:11.1986
13	222	(Australia) Nick Percat	Lucas Dumbrell Motorsport	Holden VF Commodore	1:11.2448
14	2	(Australia) Garth Tander	Holden Racing Team	Holden VF Commodore	1:11.2513
15	17	(Australia) Scott Pye	DJR Team Penske	Ford FG X Falcon	1:11.2574
16	15	(Australia) Rick Kelly	Nissan Motorsport	Nissan Altima L33	1:11.3807
17	111	(New Zealand) Chris Pither	Super Black Racing	Ford FG X Falcon	1:11.3867
18	6	(Australia) Cam Waters	Prodrive Racing Australia	Ford FG X Falcon	1:11.3961
19	8	(Australia) Jason Bright	Brad Jones Racing	Holden VF Commodore	1:11.4054
20	96	(Australia) Dale Wood	Nissan Motorsport	Nissan Altima L33	1:11.4154
21	7	(Australia) Todd Kelly	Nissan Motorsport	Nissan Altima L33	1:11.4616
22	14	(Australia) Tim Slade	Brad Jones Racing	Holden VF Commodore	1:11.4692
23	12	(New Zealand) Fabian Coulthard	DJR Team Penske	Ford FG X Falcon	1:11.5488
24	3	(New Zealand) Andre Heimgartner	Lucas Dumbrell Motorsport	Holden VF Commodore	1:11.5561
25	21	(Australia) Tim Blanchard	Britek Motorsport	Holden VF Commodore	1:11.9257
26	4	(Australia) Shae Davies	Erebus Motorsport	Holden VF Commodore	1:12.2021

==== Race ====
Pos.	No.	Driver	Team	Car	Laps	Time/Retired	Grid	Points
1	97	(New Zealand) Shane van Gisbergen (France) Alexandre Prémat	Triple Eight Race Engineering	Holden VF Commodore	102	2:21:45.5490	1	150
2	33	(New Zealand) Scott McLaughlin (Australia) David Wall	Garry Rogers Motorsport	Volvo S60	102	+0.6 s	2	138
3	88	(Australia) Jamie Whincup (Australia) Paul Dumbrell	Triple Eight Race Engineering	Holden VF Commodore	102	+1.1 s	3	129
4	1	(Australia) Mark Winterbottom (Australia) Dean Canto	Prodrive Racing Australia	Ford FG X Falcon	102	+5.7 s	9	120
5	34	(Australia) James Moffat (Australia) James Golding	Garry Rogers Motorsport	Volvo S60	102	+7.4 s	4	111
6	888	(Australia) Craig Lowndes (New Zealand) Steven Richards	Triple Eight Race Engineering	Holden VF Commodore	102	+7.5 s	12	102
7	96	(Australia) Dale Wood (Australia) David Russell	Nissan Motorsport	Nissan Altima L33	102	+8.6 s	20	96
8	7	(Australia) Todd Kelly (Australia) Matt Campbell	Nissan Motorsport	Nissan Altima L33	102	+9.7 s	23	90
9	55	(Australia) Chaz Mostert (Australia) Steve Owen	Rod Nash Racing	Ford FG X Falcon	102	+10.8 s	10	84
10	111	(New Zealand) Chris Pither (New Zealand) Richie Stanaway	Super Black Racing	Ford FG X Falcon	102	+12.1 s	17	78
11	14	(Australia) Tim Slade (Australia) Ashley Walsh	Brad Jones Racing	Holden VF Commodore	102	+12.3 s	21	72
12	8	(Australia) Jason Bright (Australia) Andrew Jones	Brad Jones Racing	Holden VF Commodore	102	+12.6 s	19	69
13	3	(New Zealand) Andre Heimgartner (Australia) Aaren Russell	Lucas Dumbrell Motorsport	Holden VF Commodore	102	+13.0 s	24	66
14	21	(Australia) Tim Blanchard (Australia) Macauley Jones	Britek Motorsport	Holden VF Commodore	102	+13.4 s	25	63
15	2	(Australia) Garth Tander (Australia) Warren Luff	Holden Racing Team	Holden VF Commodore	102	+36.6 s	14	60
16	19	(Australia) Will Davison (Australia) Jonathon Webb	Tekno Autosports	Holden VF Commodore	102	+47.7 s	8	57
17	23	(Australia) Michael Caruso (Australia) Dean Fiore	Nissan Motorsport	Nissan Altima L33	101	+1 lap	6	54
18	17	(Australia) Scott Pye (Australia) Tony D'Alberto	DJR Team Penske	Ford FG X Falcon	101	+1 lap	15	51
19	4	(Australia) Shae Davies (New Zealand) Chris van der Drift	Erebus Motorsport	Holden VF Commodore	101	+1 lap	26	48
20	22	(Australia) James Courtney (Australia) Jack Perkins	Holden Racing Team	Holden VF Commodore	97	+5 laps	11	45
21	15	(Australia) Rick Kelly (Australia) Russell Ingall	Nissan Motorsport	Nissan Altima L33	85	+17 laps	16	42
Ret	12	(New Zealand) Fabian Coulthard (Australia) Luke Youlden	DJR Team Penske	Ford FG X Falcon	95	Accident	22	
Ret	18	(Australia) Lee Holdsworth (Australia) Karl Reindler	Team 18	Holden VF Commodore	34	Accident	7	
Ret	6	(Australia) Cam Waters (Australia) Jack Le Brocq	Prodrive Racing Australia	Ford FG X Falcon	21	Accident	18	
Ret	222	(Australia) Nick Percat (Australia) Cameron McConville	Lucas Dumbrell Motorsport	Holden VF Commodore	18	Accident damage	13	
Ret	9	(Australia) David Reynolds (New Zealand) Craig Baird	Erebus Motorsport	Holden VF Commodore	4	Accident damage	5	
Fastest lap: Shane van Gisbergen (Triple Eight Race Engineering), 1:11.4567

=== Race 23 ===
==== Qualifying ====
Pos.	No.	Driver	Team	Car	Time
1	88	(Australia) Jamie Whincup	Triple Eight Race Engineering	Holden VF Commodore	1:10.3169
2	97	(New Zealand) Shane van Gisbergen	Triple Eight Race Engineering	Holden VF Commodore	1:10.4492
3	2	(Australia) Garth Tander	Holden Racing Team	Holden VF Commodore	1:10.6140
4	9	(Australia) David Reynolds	Erebus Motorsport	Holden VF Commodore	1:10.7399
5	888	(Australia) Craig Lowndes	Triple Eight Race Engineering	Holden VF Commodore	1:10.7741
6	19	(Australia) Will Davison	Tekno Autosports	Holden VF Commodore	1:10.7891
7	1	(Australia) Mark Winterbottom	Prodrive Racing Australia	Ford FG X Falcon	1:10.8391
8	55	(Australia) Chaz Mostert	Rod Nash Racing	Ford FG X Falcon	1:10.8957
9	34	(Australia) James Moffat	Garry Rogers Motorsport	Volvo S60	1:10.9440
10	33	(New Zealand) Scott McLaughlin	Garry Rogers Motorsport	Volvo S60	1:10.9869
11	23	(Australia) Michael Caruso	Nissan Motorsport	Nissan Altima L33	1:10.9901
12	14	(Australia) Tim Slade	Brad Jones Racing	Holden VF Commodore	1:11.0110
13	18	(Australia) Lee Holdsworth	Team 18	Holden VF Commodore	1:11.0382
14	22	(Australia) James Courtney	Holden Racing Team	Holden VF Commodore	1:11.0944
15	6	(Australia) Cam Waters	Prodrive Racing Australia	Ford FG X Falcon	1:11.1110
16	17	(Australia) Scott Pye	DJR Team Penske	Ford FG X Falcon	1:11.1157
17	111	(New Zealand) Chris Pither	Super Black Racing	Ford FG X Falcon	1:11.2004
18	12	(New Zealand) Fabian Coulthard	DJR Team Penske	Ford FG X Falcon	1:11.2274
19	15	(Australia) Rick Kelly	Nissan Motorsport	Nissan Altima L33	1:11.3127
20	8	(Australia) Jason Bright	Brad Jones Racing	Holden VF Commodore	1:11.3794
21	3	(New Zealand) Andre Heimgartner	Lucas Dumbrell Motorsport	Holden VF Commodore	1:11.4133
22	7	(Australia) Todd Kelly	Nissan Motorsport	Nissan Altima L33	1:11.4389
23	21	(Australia) Tim Blanchard	Britek Motorsport	Holden VF Commodore	1:11.5711
24	222	(Australia) Nick Percat	Lucas Dumbrell Motorsport	Holden VF Commodore	1:11.6632
25	96	(Australia) Dale Wood	Nissan Motorsport	Nissan Altima L33	1:11.7170
–	4	(Australia) Shae Davies	Erebus Motorsport	Holden VF Commodore	No time

==== Top Ten Shootout ====
Pos.	No.	Driver	Team	Car	Time
1	88	(Australia) Jamie Whincup	Triple Eight Race Engineering	Holden VF Commodore	1:10.8872
2	97	(New Zealand) Shane van Gisbergen	Triple Eight Race Engineering	Holden VF Commodore	1:10.9763
3	9	(Australia) David Reynolds	Erebus Motorsport	Holden VF Commodore	1:10.9973
4	33	(New Zealand) Scott McLaughlin	Garry Rogers Motorsport	Volvo S60	1:11.0298
5	888	(Australia) Craig Lowndes	Triple Eight Race Engineering	Holden VF Commodore	1:11.1143
6	55	(Australia) Chaz Mostert	Rod Nash Racing	Ford FG X Falcon	1:11.5455
7	34	(Australia) James Moffat	Garry Rogers Motorsport	Volvo S60	1:11.5899
8	1	(Australia) Mark Winterbottom	Prodrive Racing Australia	Ford FG X Falcon	1:11.6915
9	19	(Australia) Will Davison	Tekno Autosports	Holden VF Commodore	1:11.9818
–	2	(Australia) Garth Tander	Holden Racing Team	Holden VF Commodore	No time

==== Race ====
Pos.	No.	Driver	Team	Car	Laps	Time/Retired	Grid	Points
1	88	(Australia) Jamie Whincup (Australia) Paul Dumbrell	Triple Eight Race Engineering	Holden VF Commodore	102	2:09:10.5096	1	150
2	97	(New Zealand) Shane van Gisbergen (France) Alexandre Prémat	Triple Eight Race Engineering	Holden VF Commodore	102	+9.1 s	2	138
3	33	(New Zealand) Scott McLaughlin (Australia) David Wall	Garry Rogers Motorsport	Volvo S60	102	+14.1 s	4	129
4	888	(Australia) Craig Lowndes (New Zealand) Steven Richards	Triple Eight Race Engineering	Holden VF Commodore	102	+14.6 s	5	120
5	1	(Australia) Mark Winterbottom (Australia) Dean Canto	Prodrive Racing Australia	Ford FG X Falcon	102	+20.1 s	8	111
6	55	(Australia) Chaz Mostert (Australia) Steve Owen	Rod Nash Racing	Ford FG X Falcon	102	+23.5 s	6	102
7	18	(Australia) Lee Holdsworth (Australia) Karl Reindler	Team 18	Holden VF Commodore	102	+24.3 s	12	96
8	14	(Australia) Tim Slade (Australia) Ashley Walsh	Brad Jones Racing	Holden VF Commodore	102	+25.4 s	11	90
9	23	(Australia) Michael Caruso (Australia) Dean Fiore	Nissan Motorsport	Nissan Altima L33	102	+29.7 s	10	84
10	22	(Australia) James Courtney (Australia) Jack Perkins	Holden Racing Team	Holden VF Commodore	102	+40.6 s	13	78
11	2	(Australia) Garth Tander (Australia) Warren Luff	Holden Racing Team	Holden VF Commodore	102	+42.9 s	20	72
12	34	(Australia) James Moffat (Australia) James Golding	Garry Rogers Motorsport	Volvo S60	102	+43.7 s	7	69
13	19	(Australia) Will Davison (Australia) Jonathon Webb	Tekno Autosports	Holden VF Commodore	102	+44.3 s	9	66
14	6	(Australia) Cam Waters (Australia) Jack Le Brocq	Prodrive Racing Australia	Ford FG X Falcon	102	+52.4 s	14	63
15	12	(New Zealand) Fabian Coulthard (Australia) Luke Youlden	DJR Team Penske	Ford FG X Falcon	102	+53.3 s	17	60
16	222	(Australia) Nick Percat (Australia) Cameron McConville	Lucas Dumbrell Motorsport	Holden VF Commodore	102	+1:00.3	24	57
17	15	(Australia) Rick Kelly (Australia) Russell Ingall	Nissan Motorsport	Nissan Altima L33	102	+1:02.3	18	54
18	21	(Australia) Tim Blanchard (Australia) Macauley Jones	Britek Motorsport	Holden VF Commodore	102	+1:03.6	23	51
19	8	(Australia) Jason Bright (Australia) Andrew Jones	Brad Jones Racing	Holden VF Commodore	102	+1:04.0	19	48
20	9	(Australia) David Reynolds (New Zealand) Craig Baird	Erebus Motorsport	Holden VF Commodore	102	+1:04.6	3	45
21	7	(Australia) Todd Kelly (Australia) Matt Campbell	Nissan Motorsport	Nissan Altima L33	101	+1 lap	22	42
22	96	(Australia) Dale Wood (Australia) David Russell	Nissan Motorsport	Nissan Altima L33	101	+1 lap	25	39
23	17	(Australia) Scott Pye (Australia) Tony D'Alberto	DJR Team Penske	Ford FG X Falcon	101	+1 lap	15	36
Ret	3	(New Zealand) Andre Heimgartner (Australia) Aaren Russell	Lucas Dumbrell Motorsport	Holden VF Commodore	30	Accident damage	21	
Ret	111	(New Zealand) Chris Pither (New Zealand) Richie Stanaway	Super Black Racing	Ford FG X Falcon	14	Accident	16	
DNS	4	(Australia) Shae Davies (New Zealand) Chris van der Drift	Erebus Motorsport	Holden VF Commodore		Accident in Qualifying		
Fastest lap: Shane van Gisbergen (Triple Eight Race Engineering), 1:11.3587

== Championship standings after the event ==
- After Race 23 of 29. Only the top five positions are included for both sets of standings.

Drivers' Championship standings

	Pos.	Driver	Points
	1	(New Zealand) Shane van Gisbergen	2812
	2	(Australia) Jamie Whincup	2664
	3	(Australia) Craig Lowndes	2427
1	4	(New Zealand) Scott McLaughlin	2351
1	5	(Australia) Will Davison	2235

Teams' Championship standings

	Pos.	Constructor	Points
	1	Triple Eight Race Engineering	5486
	2	Holden Racing Team	3613
1	3	Garry Rogers Motorsport	3558
1	4	Prodrive Racing Australia	3460
1	5	Brad Jones Racing	3342
