= 2016 International V8 Supercars Championship =

Motor racing competition

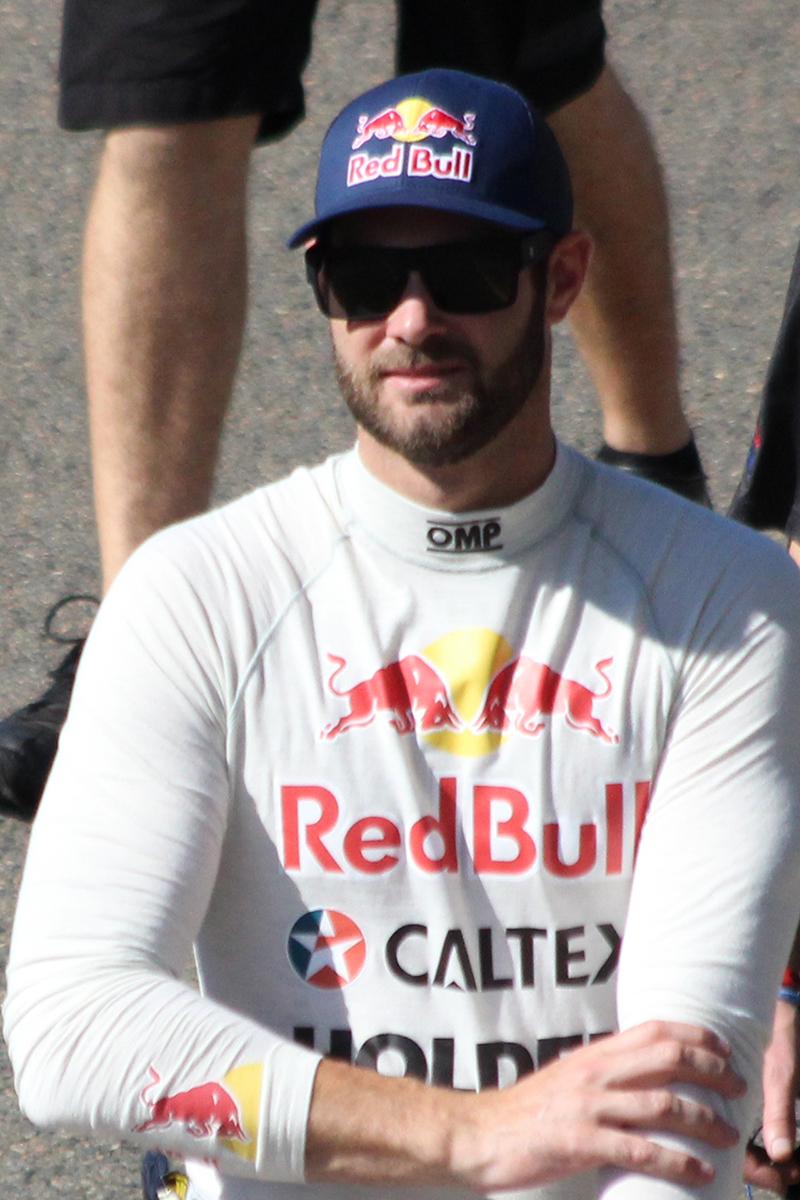
Shane van Gisbergen won his first drivers' championship.

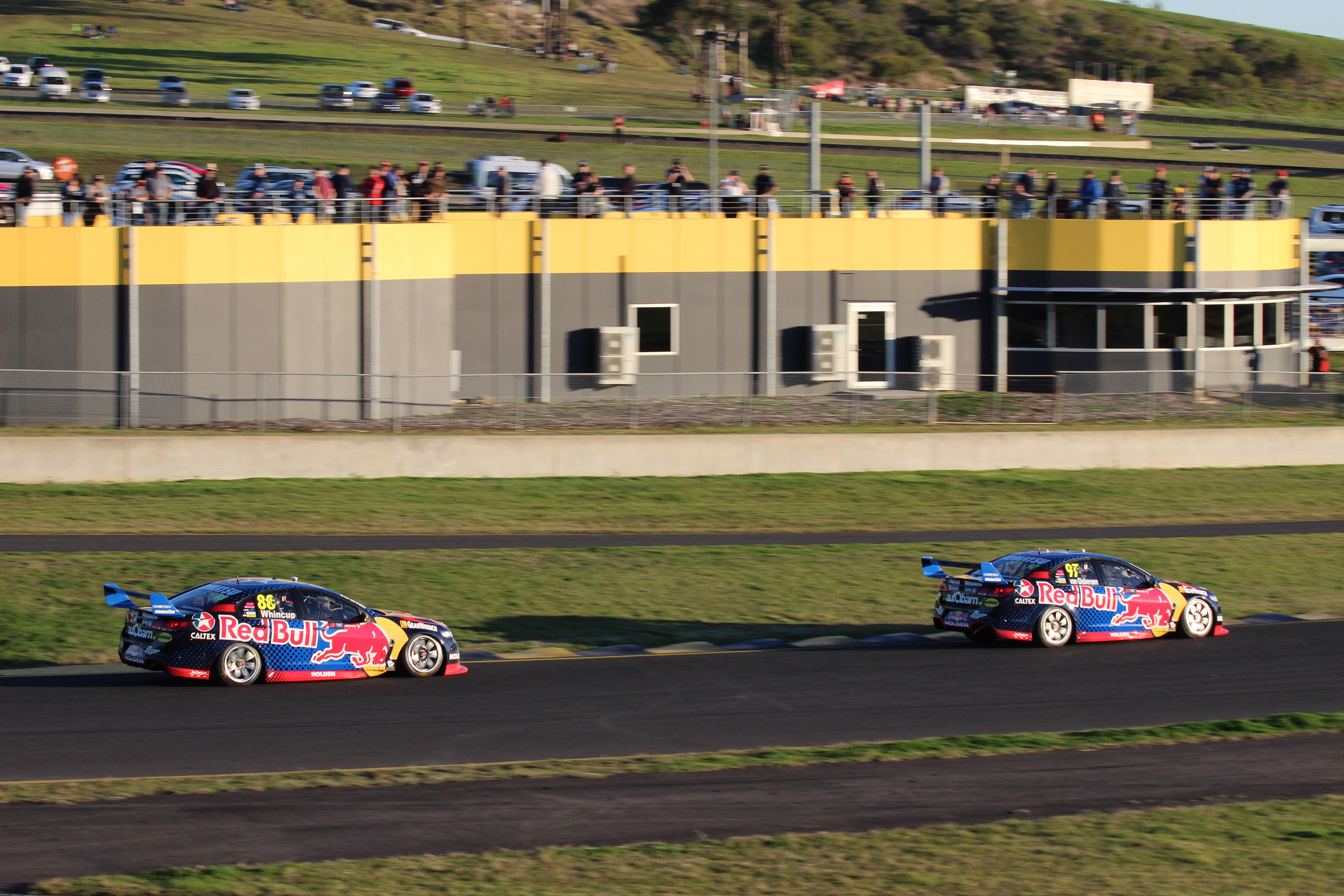
Triple Eight Race Engineering won its eighth teams' championship.

The 2016 International V8 Supercars Championship (often simplified to the 2016 V8 Supercars Championship and known from 1 July as the 2016 Virgin Australia Supercars Championship) was an FIA-sanctioned international motor racing series for Supercars. It was the eighteenth running of the Supercars Championship and the twentieth series in which Supercars have contested the premier Australian touring car title.

Mark Winterbottom started the season as the defending drivers' champion, while Triple Eight Race Engineering were the defending teams' champions.

Shane van Gisbergen, driving for Triple Eight Race Engineering, secured his first championship title with one race remaining, winning eight races during the season. Triple Eight Race Engineering won the Teams' Championship for the seventh consecutive season. Van Gisbergen, along with Alexandre Prémat, also won the Pirtek Enduro Cup.

== Teams and drivers ==
Twenty-six cars contested the 2016 season. Holden, Nissan and Volvo were all represented by factory-backed teams. Ford, having scaled back its involvement in 2015, were providing no financial or technical assistance, but were still represented by Prodrive Racing Australia and DJR Team Penske.

The following teams and drivers competed in the 2016 championship.

Championship entries						Endurance entries	
Manufacturer	Model	Team	No.	Driver name	Rounds	Co-driver name	Rounds
Ford	Falcon FG X	Prodrive Racing Australia	1	(Australia) Mark Winterbottom	All	(Australia) Dean Canto	10–12
Ford	Falcon FG X	Prodrive Racing Australia	6	(Australia) Cam Waters	All	(Australia) Jack Le Brocq	10–12
Ford	Falcon FG X	DJR Team Penske	12	(New Zealand) Fabian Coulthard	All	(Australia) Luke Youlden	10–12
Ford	Falcon FG X	DJR Team Penske	17	(Australia) Scott Pye	All	(Australia) Tony D'Alberto	10–12
Ford	Falcon FG X	Rod Nash Racing (PRA)	55	(Australia) Chaz Mostert	All	(Australia) Steve Owen	10–12
Ford	Falcon FG X	Super Black Racing (PRA)	111	(New Zealand) Chris Pither	All	(New Zealand) Richie Stanaway	10–12
Holden	Commodore VF	Holden Racing Team	2	(Australia) Garth Tander	All	(Australia) Warren Luff	10–12
Holden	Commodore VF	Holden Racing Team	22	(Australia) James Courtney	All	(Australia) Jack Perkins	10–12
Holden	Commodore VF	Lucas Dumbrell Motorsport	3	(New Zealand) Andre Heimgartner	All	(Australia) Aaren Russell	10–12
Holden	Commodore VF	Lucas Dumbrell Motorsport	222	(Australia) Nick Percat	All	(Australia) Cameron McConville	10–12
Holden	Commodore VF	Erebus Motorsport	4	(Australia) Aaren Russell	1–7	—N/a	
Holden	Commodore VF	Erebus Motorsport	4	(New Zealand) Craig Baird	8	—N/a	
Holden	Commodore VF	Erebus Motorsport	4	(Australia) Shae Davies	9–14	(New Zealand) Chris van der Drift	10–12
Holden	Commodore VF	Erebus Motorsport	9	(Australia) David Reynolds	All	(New Zealand) Craig Baird	10–12
Holden	Commodore VF	Brad Jones Racing	8	(Australia) Jason Bright	All	(Australia) Andrew Jones	10–12
Holden	Commodore VF	Brad Jones Racing	14	(Australia) Tim Slade	All	(Australia) Ashley Walsh	10–12
Holden	Commodore VF	Team 18	18	(Australia) Lee Holdsworth	1–6, 10–14	(Australia) Karl Reindler	10–12
Holden	Commodore VF	Team 18	18	(Australia) Kurt Kostecki	7–8	—N/a	
Holden	Commodore VF	Team 18	18	(Australia) Karl Reindler	9	—N/a	
Holden	Commodore VF	Tekno Autosports	19	(Australia) Will Davison	All	(Australia) Jonathon Webb	10–12
Holden	Commodore VF	Britek Motorsport (BJR)	21	(Australia) Tim Blanchard	All	(Australia) Macauley Jones	10–12
Holden	Commodore VF	Triple Eight Race Engineering	88	(Australia) Jamie Whincup	All	(Australia) Paul Dumbrell	10–12
Holden	Commodore VF	Triple Eight Race Engineering	97	(New Zealand) Shane van Gisbergen	All	(France) Alexandre Prémat	10–12
Holden	Commodore VF	Triple Eight Race Engineering	888	(Australia) Craig Lowndes	All	(New Zealand) Steven Richards	10–12
Nissan	Altima L33	Nissan Motorsport	7	(Australia) Todd Kelly	All	(Australia) Matt Campbell	10–12
Nissan	Altima L33	Nissan Motorsport	15	(Australia) Rick Kelly	All	(Australia) Russell Ingall	10–12
Nissan	Altima L33	Nissan Motorsport	23	(Australia) Michael Caruso	All	(Australia) Dean Fiore	10–12
Nissan	Altima L33	Nissan Motorsport	96	(Australia) Dale Wood	All	(Australia) David Russell	10–12
Volvo	S60	Garry Rogers Motorsport	33	(New Zealand) Scott McLaughlin	All	(Australia) David Wall	10–12
Volvo	S60	Garry Rogers Motorsport	34	(Australia) James Moffat	All	(Australia) James Golding	10–12
Wildcard entries
Nissan	Altima L33	Nissan Motorsport	360	—N/a		(Australia) Renee Gracie (Switzerland) Simona de Silvestro	11

=== Team changes ===
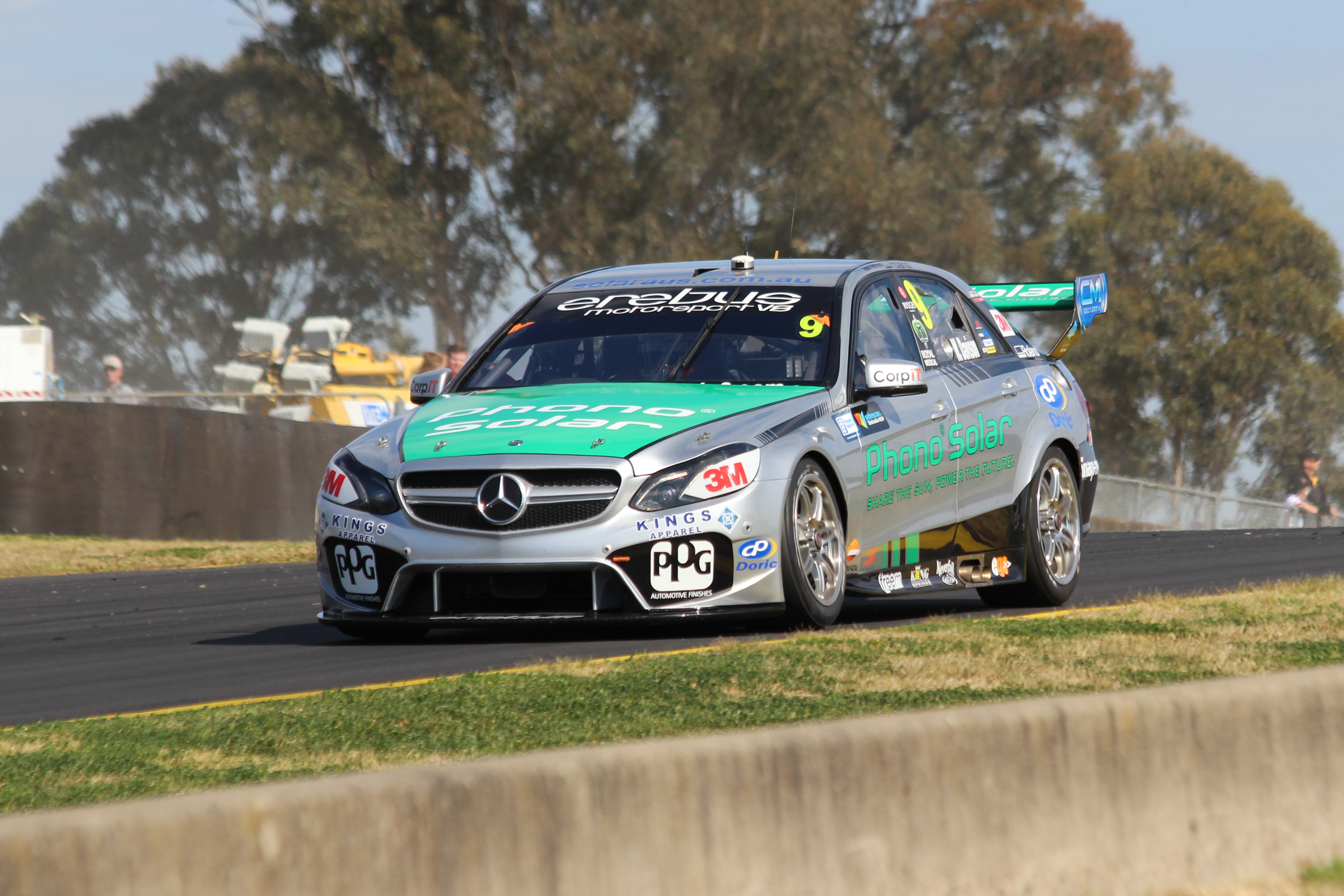

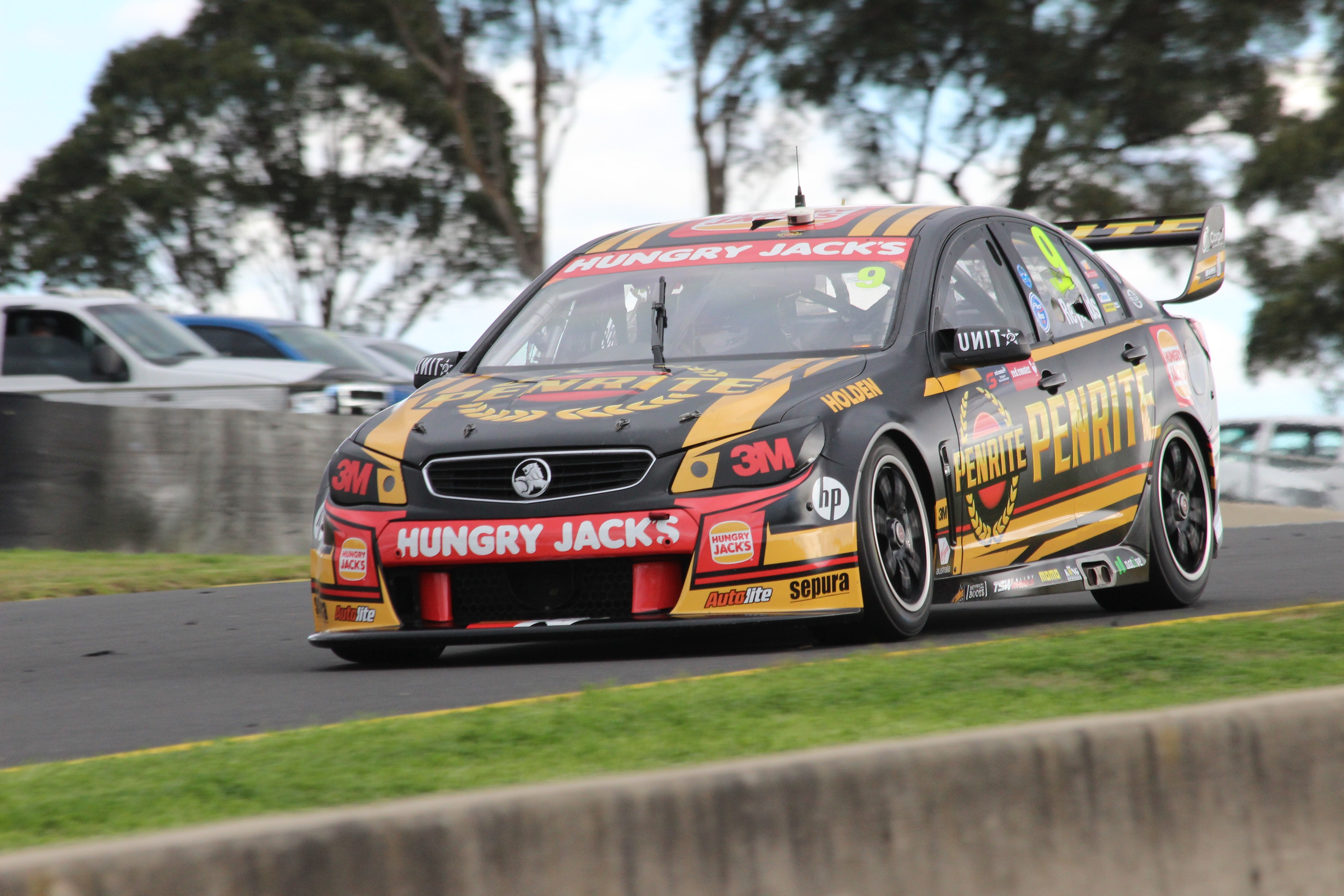
Erebus Motorsport switched from running Mercedes-Benz E63 AMGs (top) to Holden Commodore VFs (bottom).

Charlie Schwerkolt Racing terminated its customer arrangement with the Holden Racing Team, to field an in-house entry under the new Team 18 name.

DJR Team Penske expanded to run two cars, having run a single car in 2015. The team took back the Racing Entitlement Contract (REC) it had leased to Super Black Racing in 2015.

Erebus Motorsport switched from running Mercedes-Benz E63 AMGs to Holden Commodore VFs.

Triple Eight Race Engineering expanded to field three cars, purchasing a REC last used in 2014 by James Rosenberg Racing.

Walkinshaw Racing ceased at the end of 2015, with its REC sold to Super Black Racing.

=== Driver changes ===
Chaz Mostert moved from Prodrive Racing Australia to Rod Nash Racing, replacing David Reynolds. The team cited commercial reasons and not having to share a pit boom with Mark Winterbottom as the reason for the change. Reynolds moved to Erebus Motorsport, replacing Will Davison.

2015 V8 Supercars Dunlop Series champion Cam Waters replaced Mostert at Prodrive Racing Australia. Waters had substituted for Mostert in 2015 while the latter recovered from an injury.

Will Davison joined Tekno Autosports, replacing the outgoing Shane Van Gisbergen, who joined an expanded Triple Eight Race Engineering in their third car.

Aaren Russell, having raced a wildcard entry at the 2015 Bathurst 1000, joined Erebus Motorsport for his first full-time season, replacing Ashley Walsh.

Tim Blanchard moved from Lucas Dumbrell Motorsport to Britek Motorsport. Blanchard was replaced at Lucas Dumbrell Motorsport by Andre Heimgartner. Dale Wood then moved to Nissan Motorsport, replacing James Moffat.

James Moffat joined Garry Rogers Motorsport to replace David Wall. Wall was left without a full-time drive, and competed for the team at the endurance events.

Fabian Coulthard moved from Brad Jones Racing to join the expanded DJR Team Penske. He was replaced by Tim Slade, who moved from Walkinshaw Racing, which had shut down at the end of 2015.

=== Mid-season changes ===
Lee Holdsworth was injured in a heavy crash at the start of Race 13 at the Darwin Triple Crown. His team, Team 18, originally planned to use its endurance co-driver, Karl Reindler, to replace Holdsworth at the Townsville event. However, as the team's car could not be fixed in time for the event, a deal was made with Dunlop Series driver Kurt Kostecki, with Kostecki to race for the team at the Townsville and Ipswich events using his own chassis. The team completed the build of a new car ahead of the Sydney SuperSprint and Reindler drove the car at the event, with Holdsworth making his racing return at the Sandown 500.

Aaren Russell and his sponsor Plus Fitness split with Erebus Motorsport prior to the Ipswich SuperSprint. He was replaced by Craig Baird, one of the team's endurance co-drivers, for the event. Dunlop Series racer Shae Davies, who was scheduled to contest the Enduro Cup events with the team, was announced as the full-time replacement for Russell.

=== Wildcard entries ===
There would be only one wildcard entry for the Bathurst 1000 with Nissan Motorsport entering the "SuperGirls" wildcard for Renee Gracie and Simona De Silvestro.

== Calendar ==
The 2016 calendar was released on 8 September 2015. On 1 October 2015 the calendar was revised, with Tasmania and the non-championship Australian Grand Prix races switching dates due to an updated 2016 Formula One calendar. A further revision was made on 22 March 2016, with the Sydney 500 being moved back one week to avoid clashing with other events at Sydney Olympic Park.

Rnd.	Event name	Circuit	Location	Format	Date
1	(South Australia) Adelaide 500	Adelaide Street Circuit	Adelaide, South Australia	ST	5–6 March
2	Tasmania SuperSprint	Symmons Plains Raceway	Launceston, Tasmania	SP	2–3 April
3	(Victoria (state)) Phillip Island SuperSprint	Phillip Island Grand Prix Circuit	Phillip Island, Victoria	SP	16–17 April
4	(Western Australia) Perth SuperSprint	Barbagallo Raceway	Perth, Western Australia	SP	7–8 May
5	(Victoria (state)) Winton SuperSprint	Winton Motor Raceway	Benalla, Victoria	SP	21–22 May
6	(Northern Territory) Darwin Triple Crown	Hidden Valley Raceway	Darwin, Northern Territory	SP	18–19 June
7	(Queensland) Townsville 400	Reid Park Street Circuit	Townsville, Queensland	ST	9–10 July
8	(Queensland) Ipswich SuperSprint	Queensland Raceway	Ipswich, Queensland	SP	23–24 July
9	(New South Wales) Sydney SuperSprint	Sydney Motorsport Park	Eastern Creek, New South Wales	SP	27–28 August
10	(Victoria (state)) Sandown 500	Sandown Raceway	Melbourne, Victoria	EC	18 September
11	(New South Wales) Bathurst 1000	Mount Panorama Circuit	Bathurst, New South Wales	EC	9 October
12	(Queensland) Gold Coast 600	Surfers Paradise Street Circuit	Surfers Paradise, Queensland	EC	22–23 October
13	(New Zealand) Auckland SuperSprint	Pukekohe Park Raceway	Pukekohe, New Zealand	IN	5–6 November
14	(New South Wales) Sydney 500	Homebush Street Circuit	Sydney, New South Wales	ST	3–4 December

Icon	Meaning
ST	SuperStreet
SP	SuperSprint
IN	International SuperSprint
EC	Endurance Cup

Australian rounds
New Zealand rounds

=== Calendar changes ===
The Phillip Island SuperSprint moved from November to April.

The series was scheduled to visit Malaysia for the first time, with a round of the championship to be held as part of the Kuala Lumpur City Grand Prix. However, the event was cancelled following a legal dispute involving the event promoters.

=== Format changes ===
The two 60 kilometre races held on the Saturday of SuperSprint events were replaced by a single 120 km race, with a compulsory pit stop to change tyres.

The Auckland event used the International SuperSprint format that was also used at the non-championship V8 Supercars Challenge event at the Australian Grand Prix, with four 100 km races held across the weekend.

The Sydney 500 reverted to its original two race format, with a single 250 km race held on each of Saturday and Sunday, after a pair of 125 km races were held on Saturday in 2014 and 2015.

Soft tyres were used at all events except for the Bathurst 1000 and Phillip Island SuperSprint, with the season allocation increasing from 324 to 400 soft tyres per car.

Practice sessions for endurance co-drivers were held at the Winton and Queensland Raceway rounds.

=== Testing changes ===
The compulsory pre-season test was scrapped. Teams were allowed three test days, one of which had to be used before the season commences. Rookie drivers and drivers who had not competed in the series for over three years were allowed an additional three days of testing.

== Results and standings ==
=== Season summary ===
Round	Race	Event	Pole position	Fastest lap	Winning driver	Winning team	Report
1	1	Adelaide 500	(Australia) Scott Pye	(Australia) Jamie Whincup	(Australia) Jamie Whincup	Triple Eight Race Engineering	Report
1	2	Adelaide 500	(Australia) Chaz Mostert	(New Zealand) Shane van Gisbergen	(Australia) James Courtney	Holden Racing Team	Report
1	3	Adelaide 500	(New Zealand) Fabian Coulthard	(New Zealand) Shane van Gisbergen	(Australia) Nick Percat	Lucas Dumbrell Motorsport	Report
2	4	Tasmania SuperSprint	(Australia) Mark Winterbottom	(Australia) Will Davison	(New Zealand) Shane van Gisbergen	Triple Eight Race Engineering	Report
2	5	Tasmania SuperSprint	(Australia) Mark Winterbottom	(New Zealand) Fabian Coulthard	(Australia) Will Davison	Tekno Autosports	Report
3	6	Phillip Island SuperSprint	(New Zealand) Scott McLaughlin	(New Zealand) Scott McLaughlin	(New Zealand) Scott McLaughlin	Garry Rogers Motorsport	Report
3	7	Phillip Island SuperSprint	(New Zealand) Scott McLaughlin	(New Zealand) Scott McLaughlin	(New Zealand) Scott McLaughlin	Garry Rogers Motorsport	Report
4	8	Perth SuperSprint	(Australia) Cam Waters	(Australia) James Moffat	(Australia) Craig Lowndes	Triple Eight Race Engineering	Report
4	9	Perth SuperSprint	(Australia) Chaz Mostert	(Australia) Chaz Mostert	(Australia) Mark Winterbottom	Prodrive Racing Australia	Report
5	10	Winton SuperSprint	(Australia) Tim Slade	(New Zealand) Fabian Coulthard	(Australia) Tim Slade	Brad Jones Racing	Report
5	11	Winton SuperSprint	(Australia) Chaz Mostert	(Australia) David Reynolds	(Australia) Tim Slade	Brad Jones Racing	Report
6	12	Darwin Triple Crown	(New Zealand) Shane van Gisbergen	(Australia) Michael Caruso	(Australia) Michael Caruso	Nissan Motorsport	Report
6	13	Darwin Triple Crown	(New Zealand) Shane van Gisbergen	(Australia) Jason Bright	(New Zealand) Shane van Gisbergen	Triple Eight Race Engineering	Report
7	14	Townsville 400	(Australia) Jamie Whincup	(Australia) Jamie Whincup	(Australia) Jamie Whincup	Triple Eight Race Engineering	Report
7	15	Townsville 400	(Australia) Mark Winterbottom	(New Zealand) Shane van Gisbergen	(New Zealand) Shane van Gisbergen	Triple Eight Race Engineering	Report
8	16	Ipswich SuperSprint	(New Zealand) Chris Pither	(Australia) Chaz Mostert	(New Zealand) Shane van Gisbergen	Triple Eight Race Engineering	Report
8	17	Ipswich SuperSprint	(Australia) Jamie Whincup	(Australia) James Courtney	(Australia) Craig Lowndes	Triple Eight Race Engineering	Report
9	18	Sydney SuperSprint	(Australia) Chaz Mostert	(Australia) Michael Caruso	(New Zealand) Shane van Gisbergen	Triple Eight Race Engineering	Report
9	19	Sydney SuperSprint	(Australia) Chaz Mostert	(Australia) Craig Lowndes	(Australia) Jamie Whincup	Triple Eight Race Engineering	Report
10	20	Sandown 500	(Australia) Jamie Whincup (Australia) Paul Dumbrell	(Australia) Nick Percat	(Australia) Garth Tander (Australia) Warren Luff	Holden Racing Team	Report
11	21	Bathurst 1000	(Australia) Jamie Whincup	(Australia) David Reynolds	(Australia) Will Davison (Australia) Jonathon Webb	Tekno Autosports	Report
12	22	Gold Coast 600	(New Zealand) Shane van Gisbergen	(New Zealand) Shane van Gisbergen	(New Zealand) Shane van Gisbergen (France) Alexandre Prémat	Triple Eight Race Engineering	Report
12	23	Gold Coast 600	(Australia) Jamie Whincup	(New Zealand) Shane van Gisbergen	(Australia) Jamie Whincup (Australia) Paul Dumbrell	Triple Eight Race Engineering	Report
13	24	Auckland SuperSprint	(New Zealand) Shane van Gisbergen	(Australia) Jamie Whincup	(Australia) Jamie Whincup	Triple Eight Race Engineering	Report
13	25	Auckland SuperSprint	(New Zealand) Shane van Gisbergen	(New Zealand) Shane van Gisbergen	(New Zealand) Shane van Gisbergen	Triple Eight Race Engineering	Report
13	26	Auckland SuperSprint	(New Zealand) Shane van Gisbergen	(Australia) Jamie Whincup	(Australia) Mark Winterbottom	Prodrive Racing Australia	Report
13	27	Auckland SuperSprint	(Australia) Jamie Whincup	(Australia) Jamie Whincup	(Australia) Jamie Whincup	Triple Eight Race Engineering	Report
14	28	Sydney 500	(New Zealand) Shane van Gisbergen	(New Zealand) Shane van Gisbergen	(Australia) Jamie Whincup	Triple Eight Race Engineering	Report
14	29	Sydney 500	(Australia) Garth Tander	(Australia) James Courtney	(New Zealand) Shane van Gisbergen	Triple Eight Race Engineering	Report

=== Points system ===
Points were awarded for each race at an event, to the driver or drivers of a car that completed at least 75% of the race distance and was running at the completion of the race, up to a maximum of 300 points per event.

Points format	Position																										
Points format	1st	2nd	3rd	4th	5th	6th	7th	8th	9th	10th	11th	12th	13th	14th	15th	16th	17th	18th	19th	20th	21st	22nd	23rd	24th	25th	26th	27th
Short format	75	69	64	60	55	51	48	45	42	39	36	34	33	31	30	28	27	25	24	22	21	19	18	16	15	13	—N/a
Long format	150	138	129	120	111	102	96	90	84	78	72	69	66	63	60	57	54	51	48	45	42	39	36	33	30	27	—N/a
Endurance format	300	276	258	240	222	204	192	180	168	156	144	138	132	126	120	114	108	102	96	90	84	78	72	66	60	54	48

- Short format: Used for the first two races at the Clipsal 500 Adelaide and all International SuperSprint races.
- Long format: Used for all SuperSprint and SuperStreet races, with the exception of the first two races of the Clipsal 500 Adelaide, and for both races of the Gold Coast 600.
- Endurance format: Used for the Sandown 500 and Bathurst 1000.

=== Drivers' championship ===
Pos.	Driver	No.	ADE (South Australia)			SYM (Tasmania)		PHI (Victoria (state))		BAR (Western Australia)		WIN (Victoria (state))		HID (Northern Territory)		TOW (Queensland)		QLD (Queensland)		SMP (New South Wales)		**SAN** **(Victoria (state))**	**BAT** **(New South Wales)**	**SUR** **(Queensland)**		PUK (New Zealand)				SYD (New South Wales)		Pen.	Pts.
1	(New Zealand) Shane van Gisbergen	97	3	5	10	1	Ret	4	10	2	4	9	4	**16**	**1**	2	1	1	12	1	5	2	2	**1**	2	**2**	**1**	**3**	2	**3**	1	10	3368
2	(Australia) Jamie Whincup	88	1	2	14	2	19	2	4	3	11	5	9	2	8	**1**	4	2	**2**	2	1	**13**	**11**	3	**1**	1	2	25	**1**	1	4	0	3168
3	(New Zealand) Scott McLaughlin	33	4	4	12	26	4	**1**	**1**	11	2	2	11	10	7	24	5	15	6	5	6	4	15	2	3	3	7	7	3	4	5	25	2806
4	(Australia) Craig Lowndes	888	7	10	13	5	2	6	5	1	3	15	8	11	3	12	10	3	1	6	2	8	16	6	4	16	15	4	6	8	9	0	2770
5	(Australia) Will Davison	19	11	9	15	3	1	16	9	4	10	6	17	4	4	5	11	7	17	21	26	3	1	16	13	10	6	8	13	7	8	0	2589
6	(Australia) Mark Winterbottom	1	8	11	9	**9**	**3**	5	2	22	1	3	2	9	20	3	**3**	4	5	11	14	23	Ret	4	5	4	5	1	5	23	12	0	2489
7	(Australia) Chaz Mostert	55	16	**3**	Ret	10	5	23	8	12	**6**	7	**20**	3	23	4	16	5	3	**4**	**3**	5	19	9	6	21	3	6	4	17	11	15	2361
8	(Australia) Tim Slade	14	Ret	17	20	8	13	8	13	10	16	**1**	1	13	2	13	13	6	7	7	12	16	7	11	8	17	23	19	16	9	7	0	2263
9	(Australia) Garth Tander	2	5	23	3	11	6	9	16	5	7	25	12	23	14	7	20	14	13	8	7	1	Ret	15	11	5	10	10	7	2	**2**	15	2252
10	(Australia) Michael Caruso	23	13	6	2	21	11	13	6	26	9	8	10	1	6	9	8	22	4	13	10	14	8	17	9	8	9	13	12	13	14	0	2239
11	(Australia) James Courtney	22	2	1	21	13	7	21	7	6	8	19	25	21	5	6	2	13	Ret	3	8	11	13	20	10	6	13	11	14	5	6	25	2162
12	(New Zealand) Fabian Coulthard	12	10	14	**16**	18	8	3	Ret	17	15	17	3	6	Ret	8	15	10	10	10	4	6	6	Ret	15	11	4	5	8	11	21	0	2078
13	(Australia) Rick Kelly	15	9	13	7	4	Ret	14	11	9	5	4	15	15	15	21	12	8	14	9	11	10	Ret	21	17	7	12	9	24	6	Ret	0	1835
14	(Australia) Todd Kelly	7	6	16	6	19	12	11	12	7	23	13	13	7	13	10	23	12	9	24	9	7	Ret	8	21	19	16	15	11	12	19	0	1808
15	(Australia) Scott Pye	17	**12**	7	17	14	14	26	3	24	19	12	7	5	Ret	18	7	20	24	Ret	15	15	5	18	23	9	11	2	9	14	13	0	1807
16	(Australia) David Reynolds	9	14	19	5	16	18	12	14	19	21	22	6	17	9	11	14	21	23	17	19	DSQ	18	Ret	20	13	8	17	25	10	3	0	1564
17	(Australia) Jason Bright	8	19	8	8	6	10	10	Ret	16	13	11	16	12	16	14	9	16	18	18	17	21	Ret	12	19	Ret	DNS	16	19	18	Ret	0	1459
18	(Australia) Nick Percat	222	21	DNS	1	24	15	17	20	20	18	21	23	Ret	17	Ret	Ret	DSQ	20	16	20	9	3	Ret	16	14	18	18	21	15	16	10	1430
19	(Australia) Cam Waters	6	15	12	4	7	Ret	18	23	**13**	26	16	5	24	22	16	6	Ret	16	20	16	Ret	4	Ret	14	12	17	20	17	21	Ret	25	1423
20	(Australia) James Moffat	34	17	15	22	20	16	7	15	14	17	26	19	Ret	10	17	19	9	11	12	18	Ret	Ret	5	12	20	14	12	10	24	10	0	1419
21	(New Zealand) Chris Pither	111	18	Ret	DNS	17	Ret	19	24	8	14	18	18	14	11	20	22	**11**	8	14	13	17	12	10	Ret	24	24	23	22	Ret	18	0	1369
22	(Australia) Dale Wood	96	20	18	Ret	22	20	20	18	18	20	14	14	20	18	23	18	17	19	15	21	18	9	7	22	Ret	21	21	18	Ret	Ret	10	1273
23	(Australia) Tim Blanchard	21	24	24	11	15	Ret	22	17	23	22	20	22	19	21	19	17	18	25	19	22	20	10	14	18	18	20	26	20	19	Ret	0	1266
24	(Australia) Lee Holdsworth	18	23	21	18	12	9	15	19	15	12	10	Ret	8	Ret							12	Ret	Ret	7	15	19	14	15	16	15	0	1114
25	(New Zealand) Andre Heimgartner	3	22	20	19	25	Ret	24	21	21	25	23	21	18	12	15	Ret	19	15	23	24	19	Ret	13	Ret	22	22	22	Ret	20	20	0	1010
26	(France) Alexandre Prémat	97																				2	2	1	2							0	840
27	(Australia) Jonathon Webb	19																				3	1	16	13							0	681
28	(Australia) Aaren Russell	4/3	25	22	DNS	23	17	25	22	25	24	24	24	22	19	22	21					19	Ret	13	Ret							25	627
29	(Australia) David Wall	33																				4	15	2	3							25	602
30	(Australia) Paul Dumbrell	88																				**13**	11	3	1							0	555
31	(New Zealand) Steven Richards	888																				8	16	6	4							0	516
32	(Australia) Steve Owen	55																				5	19	9	6							0	504
33	(Australia) Cameron McConville	222																				9	3	Ret	16							0	483
34	(Australia) Luke Youlden	12																				6	6	Ret	15							0	468
35	(Australia) Ashley Walsh	14																				16	7	11	8							0	468
36	(Australia) Shae Davies	4																		25	25	22	17	19	DNS	23	25	24	23	22	17	0	454
37	(Australia) Dean Fiore	23																				14	8	17	9							0	444
38	(Australia) Warren Luff	2																				1	Ret	15	11							0	432
39	(Australia) Tony D'Alberto	17																				15	5	18	20							0	429
40	(Australia) David Russell	96																				18	9	7	22							0	405
41	(Australia) Jack Perkins	22																				11	13	20	10							25	374
42	(Australia) Macauley Jones	21																				20	10	14	18							0	360
43	(Australia) Matt Campbell	7																				7	Ret	8	21							0	324
44	(New Zealand) Richie Stanaway	111																				17	12	10	Ret							0	324
45	(Australia) Karl Reindler	18																		22	23	12	Ret	Ret	7							0	309
46	(Australia) Jack Le Brocq	6																				Ret	4	Ret	14							0	303
47	(Australia) Dean Canto	1																				23	Ret	4	5							0	303
48	(Australia) Russell Ingall	15																				10	Ret	21	17							0	252
49	(New Zealand) Chris van der Drift	4																				22	17	19	DNS							0	234
50	(New Zealand) Craig Baird	4/9																24	22			DSQ	18	Ret	20							0	219
51	(Australia) Andrew Jones	8																				21	Ret	12	19							0	201
52	(Australia) James Golding	34																				Ret	Ret	5	12							0	180
53	(Switzerland) Simona de Silvestro	360																					14									0	126
54	(Australia) Renee Gracie	360																					14									0	126
55	(Australia) Kurt Kostecki	18														25	Ret	23	21													0	108
Pos.	Driver	No.	ADE (South Australia)			SYM (Tasmania)		PHI (Victoria (state))		BAR (Western Australia)		WIN (Victoria (state))		HID (Northern Territory)		TOW (Queensland)		QLD (Queensland)		SMP (New South Wales)		**SAN** **(Victoria (state))**	**BAT** **(New South Wales)**	**SUR** **(Queensland)**		PUK (New Zealand)				SYD (New South Wales)		Pen.	Pts.

Colour	Result
Gold	Winner
Silver	Second place
Bronze	Third place
Green	Points classification
Blue	Non-points classification
Blue	Non-classified finish (NC)
Purple	Retired, not classified (Ret)
Red	Did not qualify (DNQ)
Red	Did not pre-qualify (DNPQ)
Black	Disqualified (DSQ)
White	Did not start (DNS)
White	Withdrew (WD)
White	Race cancelled (C)
Blank	Did not practice (DNP)
Blank	Did not arrive (DNA)
Blank	Excluded (EX)

Bold - Pole position

Italics - Fastest lap

Results count toward the Enduro Cup.

=== Teams' championship ===
Pos.	Team	No.	ADE (South Australia)			SYM (Tasmania)		PHI (Victoria (state))		BAR (Western Australia)		WIN (Victoria (state))		HID (Northern Territory)		TOW (Queensland)		QLD (Queensland)		SMP (New South Wales)		**SAN** **(Victoria (state))**	**BAT** **(New South Wales)**	**SUR** **(Queensland)**		PUK (New Zealand)				SYD (New South Wales)		Pen.	Pts.
1	Triple Eight Race Engineering	88	1	2	14	2	19	2	4	3	11	5	9	2	8	**1**	4	2	**2**	2	1	**13**	**11**	3	**1**	1	2	25	**1**	1	4	0	6546
1	Triple Eight Race Engineering	97	3	5	10	1	Ret	4	10	2	4	9	4	**16**	**1**	2	1	1	12	1	5	2	2	**1**	2	**2**	**1**	**3**	2	**3**	1	0	6546
2	Holden Racing Team	2	5	23	3	11	6	9	16	5	7	25	12	23	14	7	20	14	13	8	7	1	Ret	15	11	5	10	10	7	2	**2**	30	4434
2	Holden Racing Team	22	2	1	21	13	7	21	7	6	8	19	25	21	5	6	2	13	Ret	3	8	11	13	20	10	6	13	11	14	5	6	30	4434
3	Garry Rogers Motorsport	33	4	4	12	26	4	**1**	**1**	11	2	2	11	10	7	24	5	15	6	5	6	4	15	2	3	3	7	7	3	4	5	0	4250
3	Garry Rogers Motorsport	34	17	15	22	20	16	7	15	14	17	26	19	Ret	10	17	19	9	11	12	18	Ret	Ret	5	12	20	14	12	10	24	10	0	4250
4	Prodrive Racing Australia	1	8	11	9	**9**	**3**	5	2	22	1	3	2	9	20	3	**3**	4	5	11	14	23	Ret	4	5	4	5	1	5	23	12	0	3962
4	Prodrive Racing Australia	6	15	12	4	7	Ret	18	23	**13**	26	16	5	24	22	16	6	Ret	16	20	16	Ret	4	Ret	14	12	17	20	17	21	Ret	0	3962
5	DJR Team Penske	12	10	14	**16**	18	8	3	Ret	17	15	17	3	6	Ret	8	15	10	10	10	4	6	6	Ret	15	11	4	5	8	11	21	30	3855
5	DJR Team Penske	17	**12**	7	17	14	14	26	3	24	19	12	7	5	Ret	18	7	20	24	Ret	15	15	5	18	23	9	11	2	9	14	13	30	3855
6	Brad Jones Racing	8	19	8	8	6	10	10	Ret	16	13	11	16	12	16	14	9	16	18	18	17	21	Ret	12	19	Ret	DNS	16	19	18	Ret	0	3722
6	Brad Jones Racing	14	Ret	17	20	8	13	8	13	10	16	**1**	1	13	2	13	13	6	7	7	12	16	7	11	8	17	23	19	16	9	7	0	3722
7	Nissan Motorsport	7	6	16	6	19	12	11	12	7	23	13	13	7	13	10	23	12	9	24	9	7	Ret	8	21	19	16	15	11	12	19	0	3643
7	Nissan Motorsport	15	9	13	7	4	Ret	14	11	9	5	4	15	15	15	21	12	8	14	9	11	10	Ret	21	17	7	12	9	24	6	Ret	0	3643
8	Nissan Motorsport	23	13	6	2	21	11	13	6	26	9	8	10	1	6	9	8	22	4	13	10	14	8	17	9	8	9	13	12	13	14	0	3547
8	Nissan Motorsport	96	20	18	Ret	22	20	20	18	18	20	14	14	20	18	23	18	17	19	15	21	18	9	7	22	Ret	21	21	18	Ret	Ret	0	3547
9	Triple Eight Race Engineering	888	7	10	13	5	2	6	5	1	3	15	8	11	3	12	10	3	1	6	2	8	16	6	4	16	15	4	6	8	9	0	2770
10	Tekno Autosports	19	11	9	15	3	1	16	9	4	10	6	17	4	4	5	11	7	17	21	26	3	1	16	13	10	6	8	13	7	8	0	2589
11	Erebus Motorsport	4	25	22	DNS	23	17	25	22	25	24	24	24	22	19	22	21	24	22	25	25	22	17	19	DNS	23	25	24	23	22	17	0	2580
11	Erebus Motorsport	9	14	19	5	16	18	12	14	19	21	22	6	17	9	11	14	21	23	17	19	DSQ	18	Ret	20	13	8	17	25	10	3	0	2580
12	Lucas Dumbrell Motorsport	3	22	20	19	25	Ret	24	21	21	25	23	21	18	12	15	Ret	19	15	23	24	19	Ret	13	Ret	22	22	22	Ret	20	20	0	2450
12	Lucas Dumbrell Motorsport	222	21	DNS	1	24	15	17	20	20	18	21	23	Ret	17	Ret	Ret	DSQ	20	16	20	9	3	Ret	16	14	18	18	21	15	16	0	2450
13	Rod Nash Racing	55	16	**3**	Ret	10	5	23	8	12	**6**	7	**20**	3	23	4	16	5	3	**4**	**3**	5	19	9	6	21	3	6	4	17	11	0	2376
14	Super Black Racing	111	18	Ret	DNS	17	Ret	19	24	8	14	18	18	14	11	20	22	**11**	8	14	13	17	12	10	Ret	24	24	23	22	Ret	18	0	1369
15	Team 18	18	23	21	18	12	9	15	19	15	12	10	Ret	8	Ret	25	Ret	23	21	22	23	12	Ret	Ret	7	15	19	14	15	16	15	0	1297
16	Britek Motorsport	21	24	24	11	15	Ret	22	17	23	22	20	22	19	21	19	17	18	25	19	22	20	10	14	18	18	20	26	20	19	Ret	0	1266
17	Nissan Motorsport (w)	360																					14									0	126
Pos.	Team	No.	ADE (South Australia)			SYM (Tasmania)		PHI (Victoria (state))		BAR (Western Australia)		WIN (Victoria (state))		HID (Northern Territory)		TOW (Queensland)		QLD (Queensland)		SMP (New South Wales)		**SAN** **(Victoria (state))**	**BAT** **(New South Wales)**	**SUR** **(Queensland)**		PUK (New Zealand)				SYD (New South Wales)		Pen.	Pts.

Colour	Result
Gold	Winner
Silver	Second place
Bronze	Third place
Green	Points classification
Blue	Non-points classification
Blue	Non-classified finish (NC)
Purple	Retired, not classified (Ret)
Red	Did not qualify (DNQ)
Red	Did not pre-qualify (DNPQ)
Black	Disqualified (DSQ)
White	Did not start (DNS)
White	Withdrew (WD)
White	Race cancelled (C)
Blank	Did not practice (DNP)
Blank	Did not arrive (DNA)
Blank	Excluded (EX)

Bold - Pole position
Italics - Fastest lap

- (w) denotes wildcard entry

=== Enduro Cup ===
Pos.	Drivers	No.	**SAN** **(Victoria (state))**	**BAT** **(New South Wales)**	**SUR** **(Queensland)**		Pen.	Pts.
1	Shane van Gisbergen / Alexandre Prémat	97	2	2	**1**	2	0	840
2	Will Davison / Jonathon Webb	19	3	1	16	13	0	681
3	Scott McLaughlin / David Wall	33	4	15	2	3	25	602
4	Jamie Whincup / Paul Dumbrell	88	**13**	**11**	3	**1**	0	555
5	Craig Lowndes / Steven Richards	888	8	16	6	4	0	516
6	Chaz Mostert / Steve Owen	55	5	19	9	6	0	504
7	Nick Percat / Cameron McConville	222	9	3	Ret	16	0	483
8	Fabian Coulthard / Luke Youlden	12	6	6	Ret	15	0	468
9	Tim Slade / Ashley Walsh	14	16	7	11	8	0	468
10	Michael Caruso / Dean Fiore	23	14	8	17	9	0	444
11	Garth Tander / Warren Luff	2	1	Ret	15	11	0	432
12	Scott Pye / Tony D'Alberto	17	15	5	18	23	0	429
13	Dale Wood / David Russell	96	18	9	7	22	0	405
14	James Courtney / Jack Perkins	22	11	13	20	10	25	374
15	Tim Blanchard / Macauley Jones	21	20	10	14	18	0	360
16	Todd Kelly / Matt Campbell	7	7	Ret	8	21	0	324
17	Chris Pither / Richie Stanaway	111	17	12	10	Ret	0	324
18	Cam Waters / Jack Le Brocq	6	Ret	4	Ret	14	0	303
19	Mark Winterbottom / Dean Canto	1	23	Ret	4	5	0	303
20	Rick Kelly / Russell Ingall	15	10	Ret	21	17	0	252
21	Lee Holdsworth / Karl Reindler	18	12	Ret	Ret	12	0	234
22	Shae Davies / Chris van der Drift	4	22	17	19	DNS	0	234
23	Jason Bright / Andrew Jones	8	21	Ret	12	19	0	201
24	James Moffat / James Golding	34	Ret	Ret	5	12	0	180
25	Andre Heimgartner / Aaren Russell	3	19	Ret	13	Ret	0	162
26	David Reynolds / Craig Baird	9	DSQ	18	Ret	20	0	147
27	Simona de Silvestro / Renee Gracie	360		14			0	126
Pos.	Drivers	No.	**SAN** **(Victoria (state))**	**BAT** **(New South Wales)**	**SUR** **(Queensland)**		Pen.	Pts.

Colour	Result
Gold	Winner
Silver	Second place
Bronze	Third place
Green	Points classification
Blue	Non-points classification
Blue	Non-classified finish (NC)
Purple	Retired, not classified (Ret)
Red	Did not qualify (DNQ)
Red	Did not pre-qualify (DNPQ)
Black	Disqualified (DSQ)
White	Did not start (DNS)
White	Withdrew (WD)
White	Race cancelled (C)
Blank	Did not practice (DNP)
Blank	Did not arrive (DNA)
Blank	Excluded (EX)

Bold - Pole position
Italics - Fastest lap

== See also ==
- 2016 V8 Supercar season
