= Nick Percat =

Australian racing driver

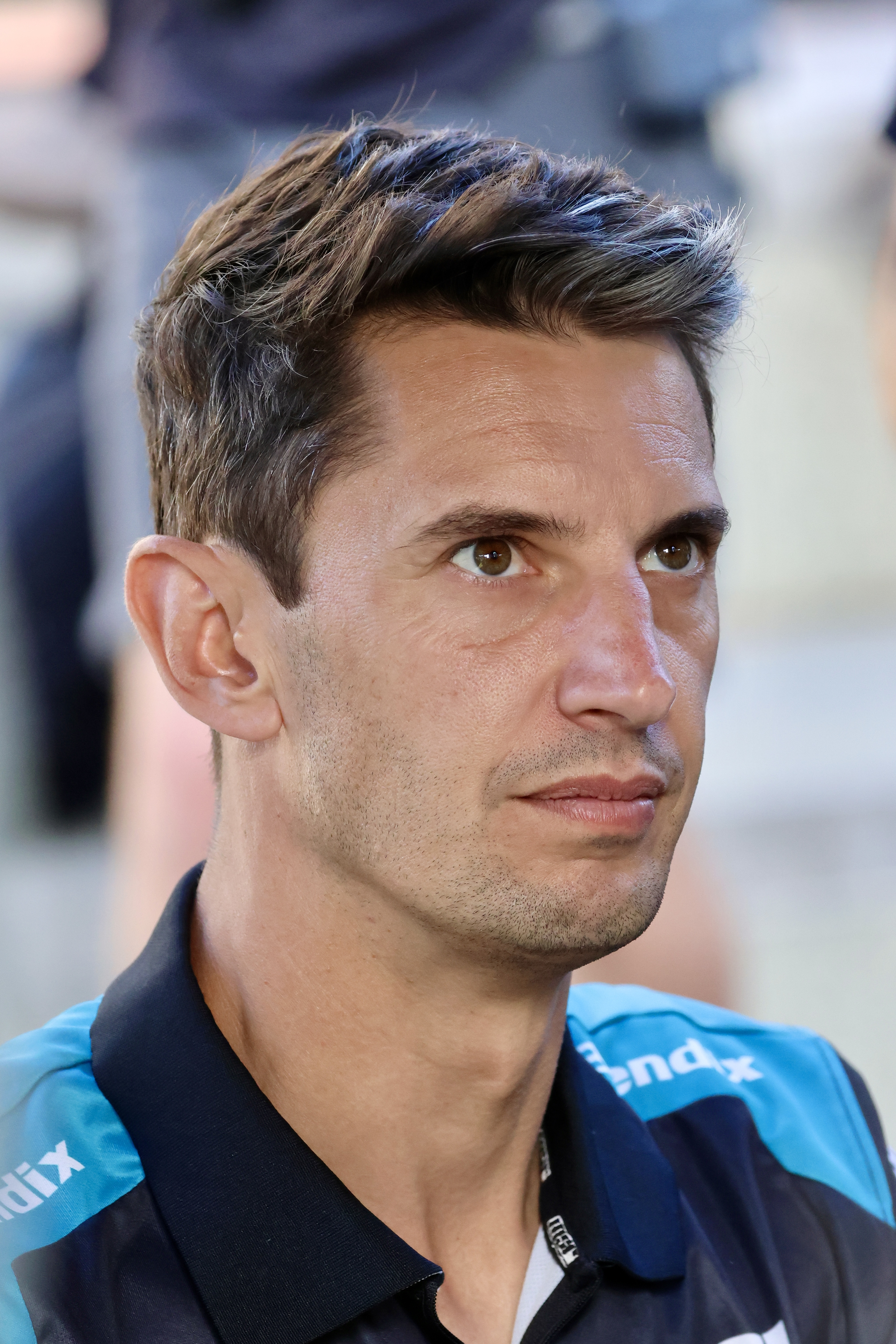
- Percat at the Adelaide Street Circuit in 2025
- Nationality: Australian
- Born: Nicholas Paul Percat; 14 September 1988 (age 38) Adelaide, South Australia
- Categorisation: FIA Gold

Supercars Championship career
- Current team: Triple Eight Race Engineering (Endurance race co-driver)
- Championships: 0
- Races: 374
- Wins: 6
- Podiums: 19
- Pole positions: 1
- 2021 position: 7th (2008 pts)

Nicholas Paul Percat (born 14 September 1988) is an Australian racing driver. He currently competes in the Repco Supercars Championship co-driving for Triple Eight Race Engineering in the No. 88 Ford Mustang GT. He won the Bathurst 1000 at his first attempt, co-driving for Garth Tander for the Holden Racing Team. Percat attended Sacred Heart College in South Australia.

== Racing career ==
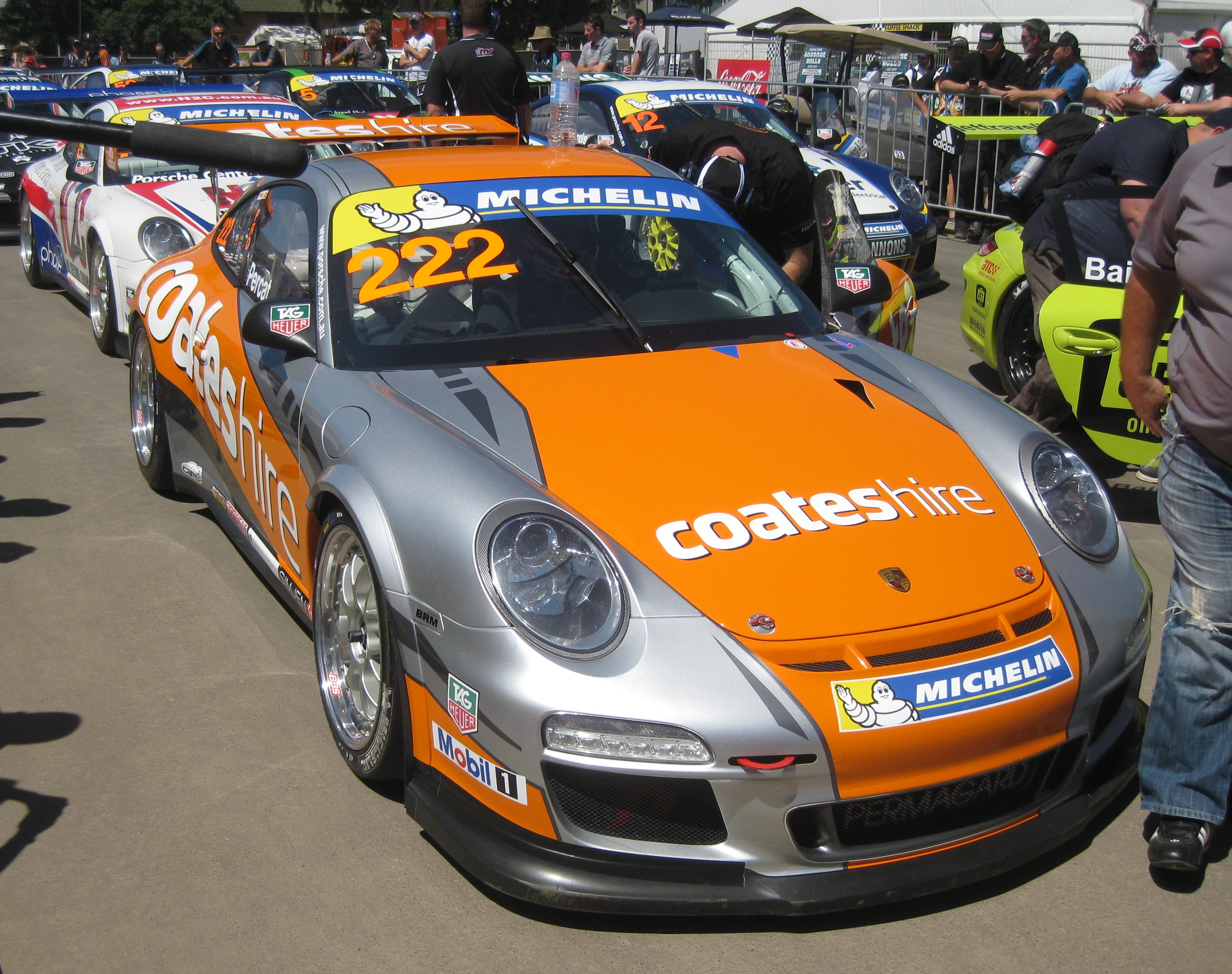
Percat placed second in the 2013 Australian Carrera Cup Championship

Percat won the 2009 Australian Formula Ford Championship in his third season in the category having dominated the season after finishing runner up the previous year to Paul Laskaseski. In 2011, he returned to single seaters for a one off support race for the 2011 Indian Grand Prix driving a Van Diemen built Formula MRF for a winner takes all $50,000 prize. He took pole position and won race one, the first-ever race held at the Buddh International Circuit, but was taken out in race two by eventual winner Jordan King.

On 9 October 2011, Percat partnered Garth Tander to win the Bathurst 1000 race for the Holden Racing Team. In winning the Bathurst 1000, Percat became the first South Australian born driver to win the race.

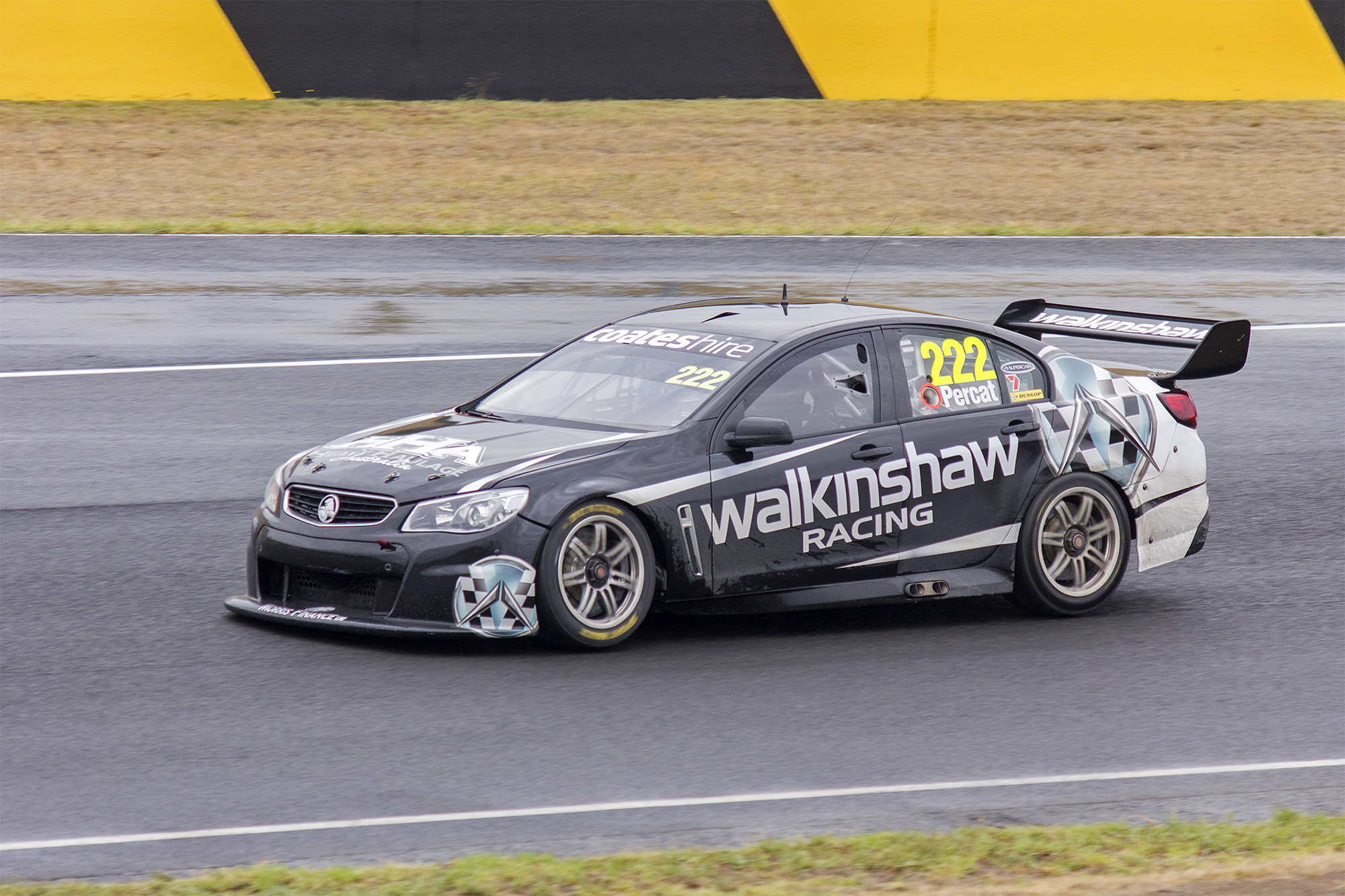
Percat at the 2014 V8 Supercars test day

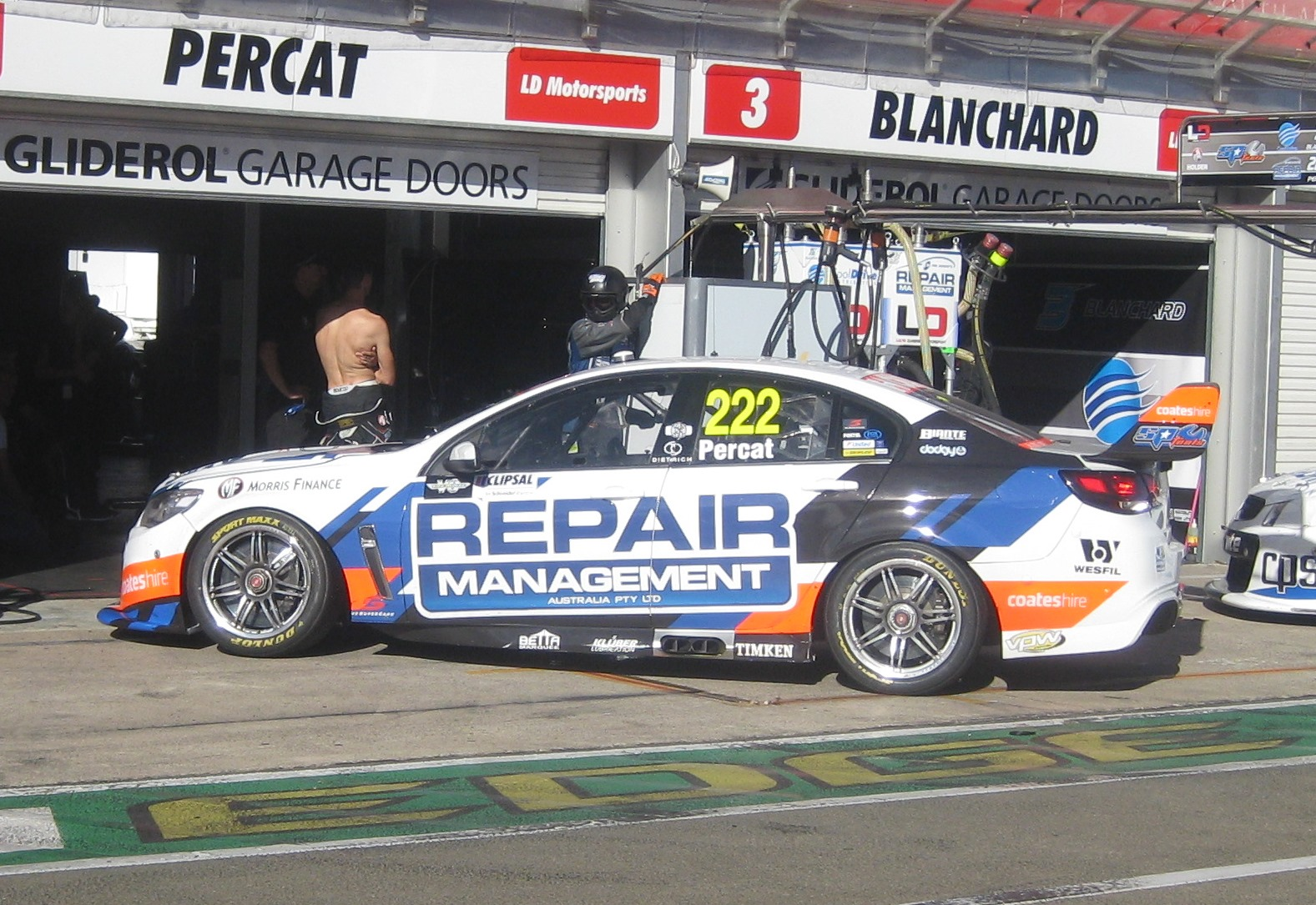
Percat's Holden VF Commodore at the 2015 Clipsal 500

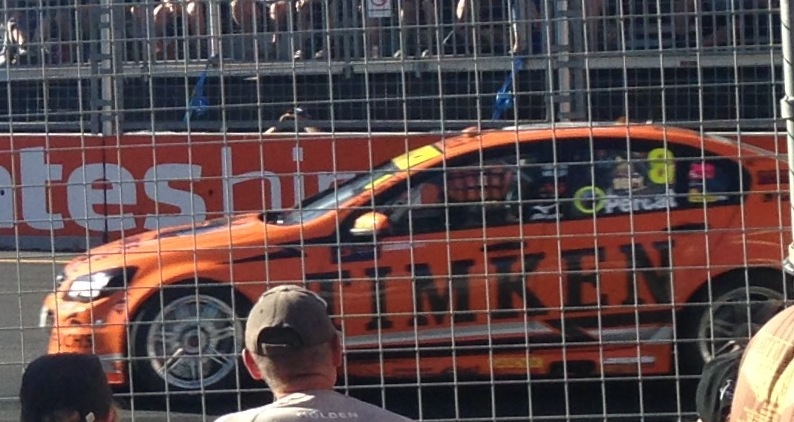
Percat at the 2017 Newcastle 500

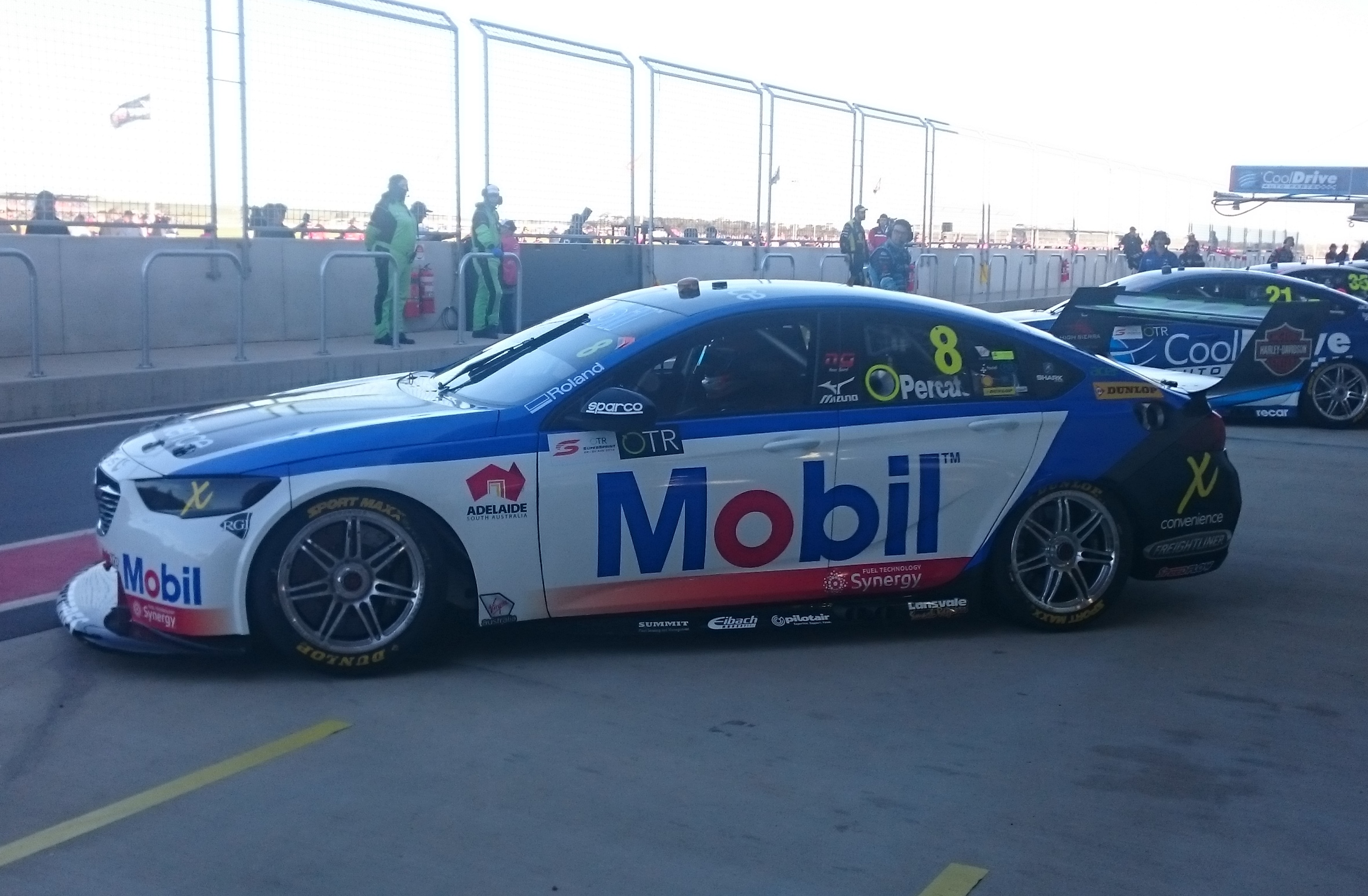
Percat's Holden Commodore ZB at The Bend Motorsport Park during the 2018 Supercars Championship

On 24 December 2014, it was announced that Percat would contest the 2015 season with Lucas Dumbrell Motorsport. He endured a mediocre season, with a best finish of sixth at the Gold Coast 600. He finished 22nd in the championship despite not racing in the final two rounds of the year due to a foot injury.

The 2016 season kicked off with Percat taking a shock win in unpredictable circumstances at the 2016 Clipsal 500 Adelaide, which was also the first win for the team. Percat became the first South Australian driver to win the local event.

Percat continued his strong form at the 2016 Bathurst 1000 by scoring a podium with co-drive Cameron McConville. Percat has finished on the podium three times out of his eight starts. Percat signed a contract to race for Brad Jones Racing, replacing outgoing driver Jason Bright. Results for Percat were mixed due to a horror run of bad luck from the BJR team. The highlight of the year was Percat's first podium for the team at the Darwin Triple Crown event.

Results for 2018 were much improved for Percat, and the whole BJR team, with Percat scoring two podiums at the Australian Grand Prix event, narrowly missing out on winning the Larry Perkins Trophy. Percat finished the year tenth in the championship, his best result to date.

In 2019, Percat took another step forward in the championship. He didn't score a podium, but was one of the most consistent drivers in the field and finished the year in ninth.

In 2020, Percat enjoyed his best Supercars season to date, finishing seventh in the Championship, claimed two wins during the Sydney SuperSprint round and a podium finish in the second race of the Darwin SuperSprint.

After five seasons with Brad Jones Racing, Percat announced on 26 October 2021 that he would be returning to Walkinshaw Andretti United in 2022 on a multiple-year deal.

Following a period of disappointing results amid Walkinshaw’s debut season aboard Ford Mustang’s for 2023, it was announced on 21 August 2023 that Percat would no longer be driving for the team in 2024.

== Career results ==
=== Career summary ===
Season	Series	Position	Car	Team
2005	South Australian Formula Ford Championship	1st	Swift SC94F Ford	
2005	Victorian Formula Ford Championship	28th	Mygale SJ97 Ford	
2006	South Australian Formula Ford Championship	9th	Spectrum 010b Ford	
2007	Australian Formula Ford Championship	7th	Spectrum 011b Ford; Van Diemen RF06 Ford	
2008	Australian Formula Ford Championship	2nd	Mygale SJ07A Ford	Sonic Motor Racing Services
2008	Australian Drivers' Championship	8th	Dallara F307 HWA-Mercedes-Benz	Team BRM
2009	Australian Formula Ford Championship	1st	Mygale SJ07A Ford	Sonic Motor Racing Services
2010	Fujitsu V8 Supercar Series	4th	Holden VZ Commodore; Holden VE Commodore	Jay Motorsport; Walkinshaw Performance
2010	V8 Supercar Championship Series	63rd	Holden VE Commodore	Walkinshaw Racing
2011	MRF 1600 - Delhi	4th	Van Diemen MRF 1600 - Ford	Walkinshaw Performance
2011	Fujitsu V8 Supercar Series	7th	Holden VE Commodore	Walkinshaw Performance
2011	International V8 Supercars Championship	30th	Holden VE Commodore	Holden Racing Team
2012	Dunlop V8 Supercar Series	4th	Holden VE Commodore	Walkinshaw Performance
2012	International V8 Supercars Championship	41st	Holden VE Commodore	Holden Racing Team
2013	International V8 Supercars Championship	33rd	Holden VF Commodore	Holden Racing Team
2013	Australian Carrera Cup Championship	2nd	Porsche 911 GT3 Cup Type 997	Team BRM
2013	V8SuperTourers Season	34th	Holden VE Commodore	M3 Racing
2014	International V8 Supercars Championship	12th	Holden VF Commodore	James Rosenberg Racing
2015	International V8 Supercars Championship	22nd	Holden VF Commodore	Lucas Dumbrell Motorsport
2016	International V8 Supercars Championship	18th	Holden VF Commodore	Lucas Dumbrell Motorsport
2017	Virgin Australia Supercars Championship	19th	Holden VF Commodore	Brad Jones Racing
2018	Virgin Australia Supercars Championship	10th	Holden ZB Commodore	Brad Jones Racing
2019	Virgin Australia Supercars Championship	9th	Holden ZB Commodore	Brad Jones Racing
2020	Virgin Australia Supercars Championship	7th	Holden ZB Commodore	Brad Jones Racing
2021	Repco Supercars Championship	7th	Holden ZB Commodore	Brad Jones Racing
2022	Repco Supercars Championship	15th	Holden ZB Commodore	Walkinshaw Andretti United
2023	Repco Supercars Championship	20th	Ford Mustang GT S650	Walkinshaw Andretti United
2024	Repco Supercars Championship	8th	Camaro ZL1	Matt Stone Racing
2025	Repco Supercars Championship	16th	Camaro ZL1	Matt Stone Racing

=== Super2 Series results ===
Super2 Series results
Year	Team	No.	Car	1	2	3	4	5	6	7	8	9	10	11	12	13	14	15	16	17	18	Position	Points
2010	Jay Motorsport	222	Holden VZ Commodore	ADE; R1; 4	ADE; R2; 10	QLD; R3; 8	QLD; R4; 4	QLD; R5; 7	WIN; R6; 6	WIN; R7; 3	WIN; R8; 3	TOW; R9; 10	TOW; R10; 2	TOW; R11; 3								4th	1446
2010	Walkinshaw Racing	222	Holden VE Commodore												BAT; R12; 5	BAT; R13; 3	SAN; R14; Ret	SAN; R15; Ret	SAN; R16; 7	SYD; R17; 2	SYD; R18; 2	4th	1446
2011	Walkinshaw Racing	222	Holden VE Commodore	ADE; R1; 2	ADE; R2; 3	BAR; R3; Ret	BAR; R4; 16	TOW; R5; 3	TOW; R6; 6	TOW; R7; 5	QLD; R8; Ret	QLD; R9; 6	QLD; R10; 8	BAT; R11; 4	BAT; R12; 8	SAN; R13; 3	SAN; R14; Ret	SAN; R15; Ret	SYD; R16; 2	SYD; R17; 2		7th	1207
2012	Walkinshaw Racing	222	Holden VE Commodore	ADE; R1; 3	ADE; R2; 2	BAR; R3; 8	BAR; R4; 1	BAR; R5; Ret	TOW; R6; 2	TOW; R7; 3	TOW; R8; 1	QLD; R9; 4	QLD; R10; 23	QLD; R11; 10	BAT; R12; 1	BAT; R13; 1	WIN; R14; 1	WIN; R15; 2	WIN; R16; 1	SYD; R17; Ret	SYD; R18; 5	4th	1561

=== Supercars Championship results ===
Supercars results
Year	Team	No.	Car	1	2	3	4	5	6	7	8	9	10	11	12	13	14	15	16	17	18	19	20	21	22	23	24	25	26	27	28	29	30	31	32	33	34	35	36	37	38	39	Position	Points
2010	Walkinshaw Racing	10	Holden VE Commodore	YMC; R1	YMC; R2	BHR; R3	BHR; R4	ADE; R5	ADE; R6	HAM; R7	HAM; R8	QLD; R9	QLD; R10	WIN; R11	WIN; R12	HDV; R13	HDV; R14	TOW; R15	TOW; R16	PHI; QR; 18	PHI; R17; 26	BAT; R18	SUR; R19	SUR; R20	SYM; R21	SYM; R22	SAN; R23	SAN; R24	SYD; R25	SYD; R26													63rd	53
2011	Holden Racing Team	2	Holden VE Commodore	YMC; R1	YMC; R2	ADE; R3	ADE; R4	HAM; R5	HAM; R6	BAR; R7	BAR; R8	BAR; R9	WIN; R10	WIN; R11	HID; R12	HID; R13	TOW; R14	TOW; R15	QLD; R16	QLD; R17	QLD; R18	PHI; QR; 14	PHI; R19; 4	BAT; R20; 1	SUR; R21	SUR; R22	SYM; R23	SYM; R24	SAN; R25	SAN; R26	SYD; R27	SYD; R28											30th	527
2012	Holden Racing Team	2	Holden VE Commodore	ADE; R1	ADE; R2	SYM; R3	SYM; R4	HAM; R5	HAM; R6	BAR; R7	BAR; R8	BAR; R9	PHI; R10	PHI; R11	HID; R12	HID; R13	TOW; R14	TOW; R15	QLD; R16	QLD; R17	SMP; R18	SMP; R19	SAN; QR; 6	SAN; R20; 4	BAT; R21; 25	SUR; R22	SUR; R23	YMC; R24	YMC; R25	YMC; R26	WIN; R27	WIN; R28	SYD; R29	SYD; R30									41st	297
2013	Holden Racing Team	2	Holden VF Commodore	ADE; R1	ADE; R2	SYM; R3	SYM; R4	SYM; R5	PUK; R6	PUK; R7	PUK; R8	PUK; R9	BAR; R10	BAR; R11	BAR; R12	COA; R13	COA; R14	COA; R15	COA; R16	HID; R17	HID; R18	HID; R19	TOW; R20	TOW; R21	QLD; R22	QLD; R23	QLD; R24	WIN; R25	WIN; R26	WIN; R27	SAN; QR; 4	SAN; R28; 22	BAT; R29; 4	SUR; R30; 18	SUR; R31; 7	PHI; R32	PHI; R33	PHI; R34					33rd	549
2013	Holden Racing Team	22	Holden VF Commodore																																				SYD; R35; 18	SYD; R36; 24				
2014	James Rosenberg Racing	222	Holden VF Commodore	ADE; R1; 22	ADE; R2; 15	ADE; R3; Ret	SYM; R4; 17	SYM; R5; Ret	SYM; R6; 15	WIN; R7; 21	WIN; R8; 15	WIN; R9; 17	PUK; R10; 6	PUK; R11; 7	PUK; R12; 7	PUK; R13; 11	BAR; R14; 22	BAR; R15; 20	BAR; R16; 11	HID; R17; 23	HID; R18; 19	HID; R19; 23	TOW; R20; 4	TOW; R21; 9	TOW; R22; 5	QLD; R23; 12	QLD; R24; 7	QLD; R25; 7	SMP; R26; 16	SMP; R27; 19	SMP; R28; 2	SAN; QR; 16	SAN; R29; 22	BAT; R30; 3	SUR; R31; 18	SUR; R32; 10	PHI; R33; 10	PHI; R34; 10	PHI; R35; 8	SYD; R36; 12	SYD; R37; 19	SYD; R38; 11	12th	1921
2015	Lucas Dumbrell Motorsport	222	Holden VF Commodore	ADE; R1; 18	ADE; R2; 14	ADE; R3; 20	SYM; R4; 16	SYM; R5; 18	SYM; R6; 17	BAR; R7; 19	BAR; R8; 17	BAR; R9; 8	WIN; R10; 10	WIN; R11; 12	WIN; R12; 16	HID; R13; 9	HID; R14; Ret	HID; R15; 6	TOW; R16; Ret	TOW; R17; 15	QLD; R18; 12	QLD; R19; Ret	QLD; R20; 11	SMP; R21; 21	SMP; R22; 17	SMP; R23; 9	SAN; QR; 10	SAN; R24; Ret	BAT; R25; 19	SUR; R26; 6	SUR; R27; 15	PUK; R28; 16	PUK; R29; 20	PUK; R30; Ret	PHI; R31	PHI; R32	PHI; R33	SYD; R34	SYD; R35	SYD; R36			22nd	1204
2016	Lucas Dumbrell Motorsport	222	Holden VF Commodore	ADE; R1; 21	ADE; R2; DNS	ADE; R3; 1	SYM; R4; 24	SYM; R5; 15	PHI; R6; 17	PHI; R7; 20	BAR; R8; 20	BAR; R9; 18	WIN; R10; 21	WIN; R11; 23	HID; R12; Ret	HID; R13; 17	TOW; R14; Ret	TOW; R15; Ret	QLD; R16; DSQ	QLD; R17; 20	SMP; R18; 16	SMP; R19; 20	SAN; R20; 13	SAN; R20; 9	BAT; R21; 3	SUR; R22; Ret	SUR; R23; 16	PUK; R24; 14	PUK; R25; 18	PUK; R26; 18	PUK; R27; 21	SYD; R28; 15	SYD; R29; 16										18th	1430
2017	Brad Jones Racing	8	Holden VF Commodore	ADE; R1; 7	ADE; R2; Ret	SYM; R3; Ret	SYM; R4; 11	PHI; R5; Ret	PHI; R6; 21	BAR; R7; 22	BAR; R8; 10	WIN; R9; 10	WIN; R10; 12	HID; R11; 3	HID; R12; 15	TOW; R13; 24	TOW; R14; 16	QLD; R15; 7	QLD; R16; 24	SMP; R17; 24	SMP; R18; 6	SAN; QR; 10	SAN; R19; 22	BAT; R20; Ret	SUR; R21; 21	SUR; R22; 10	PUK; R23; 16	PUK; R24; 14	NEW; R25; 8	NEW; R26; 6													19th	1527
2018	Brad Jones Racing	8	Holden ZB Commodore	ADE; R1; 11	ADE; R2; 15	MEL; R3; 9	MEL; R4; 7	MEL; R5; 3	MEL; R6; 2	SYM; R7; 12	SYM; R8; 9	PHI; R9; 26	PHI; R10; 13	BAR; R11; 9	BAR; R12; 7	WIN; R13; 18	WIN; R14; 14	HID; R15; 9	HID; R16; 6	TOW; R17; 10	TOW; R18; 13	QLD; R19; 10	QLD; R20; 25	SMP; R21; 8	BEN; R22; 11	BEN; R23; 5	SAN; QR; 25	SAN; R24; 24	BAT; R25; 7	SUR; R26; 6	SUR; R27; C	PUK; R28; 8	PUK; R29; 10	NEW; R30; Ret	NEW; R31; 12								10th	2290
2019	Brad Jones Racing	8	Holden ZB Commodore	ADE; R1; 7	ADE; R2; 5	MEL; R3; 14	MEL; R4; 15	MEL; R5; 8	MEL; R6; 10	SYM; R7; 8	SYM; R8; 7	PHI; R9; 9	PHI; R10; 10	BAR; R11; 7	BAR; R12; 10	WIN; R13; 7	WIN; R14; 9	HID; R15; 13	HID; R16; 15	TOW; R17; 8	TOW; R18; 19	QLD; R19; 8	QLD; R20; 9	BEN; R21; 8	BEN; R22; 4	PUK; R23; 12	PUK; R24; 4	BAT; R25; 14	SUR; R26; 14	SUR; R27; 10	SAN; QR; 18	SAN; R28; 11	NEW; R29; 14	NEW; R30; 9									9th	2445
2020	Brad Jones Racing	8	Holden ZB Commodore	ADE; R1; 22	ADE; R2; 7	MEL; R3; C	MEL; R4; C	MEL; R5; C	MEL; R6; C	SMP1; R7; 5	SMP1; R8; 1	SMP1; R9; 9	SMP2; R10; 9	SMP2; R11; 1	SMP2; R12; 11	HID1; R13; Ret	HID1; R14; 6	HID1; R15; 6	HID2; R16; 5	HID2; R17; 13	HID2; R18; 2	TOW1; R19; Ret	TOW1; R20; 5	TOW1; R21; 4	TOW2; R22; 6	TOW2; R23; 4	TOW2; R24; 7	BEN1; R25; 10	BEN1; R26; 9	BEN1; R27; 17	BEN2; R28; 6	BEN2; R29; 6	BEN2; R30; 4	BAT; R19; 18									7th	1743
2021	Brad Jones Racing	8	Holden ZB Commodore	BAT1; R1; 18	BAT1; R2; 10	SAN; R3; 7	SAN; R5; 9	SYM; R6; 24	SYM; R7; 11	SYM; R8; 10	BEN; R9; 5	BEN; R10; 17	BEN; R11; 6	HID; R12; 3	HID; R13; 9	HID; R14; 6	TOW1; R15; 4	TOW1; R16; 20	TOW2; R17; 13	TOW2; R18; 15	TOW2; R19; 10	SMP1; R20; 4	SMP1; R21; 3	SMP1; R22; 11	SMP2; R23; 4	SMP2; R24; 9	SMP2; R25; 4	SMP3; R26; 23	SMP3; R27; 7	SMP3; R28; 4	SMP4; R29; 10	SMP4; R30; C	BAT2; R31; 6										7th	2008
2022	Walkinshaw Andretti United	2	Holden ZB Commodore	SMP; R1; 6	SMP; R2; 23	SYM; R3; 24	SYM; R4; 11	SYM; R5; 10	MEL; R6; 5	MEL; R7; 17	MEL; R8; 16	MEL; R9; 6	BAR; R10; 21	BAR; R11; 18	BAR; R12; 15	WIN; R13; 14	WIN; R14; 16	WIN; R15; 15	HID; R16; 14	HID; R17; 10	HID; R18; 10	TOW; R19; 13	TOW; R20; 12	BEN; R21; 13	BEN; R22; Ret	BEN; R23; 9	SAN; R24; 15	SAN; R25; 19	SAN; R26; 22	PUK; R27; 8	PUK; R28; 14	PUK; R29; 9	BAT; R30; 22	SUR; R31; 10	SUR; R32; Ret	ADE; R33; 2	ADE; R34; 12						15th	1643
2023	Walkinshaw Andretti United	2	Ford Mustang S550	NEW; R1; Ret	NEW; R2; 23	MEL; R3; 14	MEL; R4 ret	MEL; R5; 16	MEL; R6; 20	BAR; R7; 17	BAR; R8; 19	BAR; R9; 13	SYM; R10; 9	SYM; R11; 10	SYM; R12; 23	HID; R13; 18	HID; R14; 19	HID; R15; 15	TOW; R16; 24	TOW; R17; 13	SMP; R18; 20	SMP; R19; 19	BEN; R20; 18	BEN; R21; 12	BEN; R22; 4	SAN; R23; 23	BAT; R24; 14	SUR; R25; 18	SUR; R26; 12	ADE; R27; 18	ADE; R28; 21												20th	1230
2024	Matt Stone Racing	10	Chevrolet Camaro ZL1	BAT1; R1; 6	BAT1; R2; 9	MEL; R3; 6	MEL; R4; 6	MEL; R5; 9	MEL; R6; 1	TAU; R7; 19	TAU; R8; 16	BAR; R9; 7	BAR; R10; 21	HID; R11; 7	HID; R12; 5	TOW; R13; 21	TOW; R14; 20	SMP; R15; 8	SMP; R16; 8	SYM; R17; 1	SYM; R18; 7	SAN; R19; 23	BAT2; R20; 17	SUR; R21; 12	SUR; R22; 22	ADE; R23; 14	ADE; R24; 5																8th	1830
2025	Matt Stone Racing	10	Chevrolet Camaro ZL1	SMP; R1; 12	SMP; R2; 21	SMP; R3; 15	MEL; R4; 13	MEL; R5; 2	MEL; R6; 3	MEL; R7; C	TAU; R8; 19	TAU; R9; 15	TAU; R10; 23	SYM; R11; 20	SYM; R12; 2	SYM; R13; 9	BAR; R14; 12	BAR; R15; 8	BAR; R16; 17	HID; R17; 7	HID; R18; 11	HID; R19; 16	TOW; R20; 22	TOW; R21; 14	TOW; R22; 12	QLD; R23; 18	QLD; R24; 13	QLD; R25; 22	BEN; R26; 5	BAT; R27; Ret	SUR; R28; 18	SUR; R29; 22	SAN; R30; 23	SAN; R31; 19	ADE; R32; 14	ADE; R33; 18	ADE; R34; 22						16th	1286
2026	Triple Eight Race Engineering	88	Ford Mustang S650	SMP; R1	SMP; R2	SMP; R3	MEL; R4	MEL; R5	MEL; R6	MEL; R7	TAU; R8	TAU; R9	TAU; R10	CHR; R11	CHR; R12	CHR; R13	SYM; R14	SYM; R15	SYM; R16	BAR; R17	BAR; R18	BAR; R19	HID; R20	HID; R21	HID; R22	TOW; R23	TOW; R24	TOW; R25	QLD; R26	QLD; R27	QLD; R28	BEN; R29	BAT; R30	SUR; R31	SUR; R32	SAN; R33	SAN; R34	ADE; R35	ADE; R36	ADE; R37				

=== Bathurst 1000 results ===
Year	Team	Car	Co-driver	Position	Laps
2011	Holden Racing Team	Holden Commodore VE	(Australia) Garth Tander	1st	161
2012	Holden Racing Team	Holden Commodore VE	(Australia) Garth Tander	25th	139
2013	Holden Racing Team	Holden Commodore VF	(Australia) Garth Tander	4th	161
2014	James Rosenberg Racing	Holden Commodore VF	(United Kingdom) Oliver Gavin	3rd	161
2015	Lucas Dumbrell Motorsport	Holden Commodore VF	(United Kingdom) Oliver Gavin	19th	159
2016	Lucas Dumbrell Motorsport	Holden Commodore VF	(Australia) Cameron McConville	3rd	161
2017	Brad Jones Racing	Holden Commodore VF	(Australia) Macauley Jones	DNF	160
2018	Brad Jones Racing	Holden Commodore ZB	(Australia) Macauley Jones	7th	161
2019	Brad Jones Racing	Holden Commodore ZB	(Australia) Tim Blanchard	14th	160
2020	Brad Jones Racing	Holden Commodore ZB	(Australia) Thomas Randle	18th	133
2021	Brad Jones Racing	Holden Commodore ZB	(Australia) Dale Wood	6th	161
2022	Walkinshaw Andretti United	Holden Commodore ZB	(Australia) Warren Luff	22nd	148
2023	Walkinshaw Andretti United	Ford Mustang S650	(New Zealand) Fabian Coulthard	14th	161
2024	Matt Stone Racing	Chevrolet Camaro Mk.6	(Australia) Dylan O'Keeffe	17th	161
2025	Matt Stone Racing	Chevrolet Camaro Mk.6	(Australia) Tim Slade	DNF	50
2026	Triple Eight Race Engineering	Ford Mustang S650	(Australia) Broc Feeney	11th	161

== Retirement ==
On 7 October 2025, Percat announced his retirement at the end of the 2025 season.

Sporting positions
Preceded by Paul Laskazeski	Australian Formula Ford Championship; Champion; 2009	Succeeded by Chaz Mostert
Preceded by Craig Lowndes; Mark Skaife	Winner of the Bathurst 1000; 2011 (with Garth Tander)	Succeeded by Jamie Whincup; Paul Dumbrell
Preceded by James Courtney	Winner of the Clipsal 500; 2016	Succeeded by Shane van Gisbergen
