= Jack Daniel's Racing =

Jack Daniel's Racing may refer to these motor racing teams:

- Kelly Racing, International V8 Supercars Championship
- Perkins Engineering, International V8 Supercars Championship
- Richard Childress Racing, NASCAR Sprint Cup

== See also ==
- Jack Daniel's
