= 2014 Clipsal 500 =

2014 V8 Supercar championship race

(South Australia) 2014 Clipsal 500 Adelaide
Event Information
- Round 1 of 14 in the 2014 International V8 Supercars Championship
- Date: 27 February–2 March 2014
- Location: Adelaide, South Australia
- Venue: Adelaide Street Circuit
- Weather: Fine

Results
Race 1
Distance	39 laps	125 km
Pole position	Jamie Whincup; Triple Eight Race Engineering	1:20.5849
Winner	Jamie Whincup; Triple Eight Race Engineering	53:57.5158
Race 2
Distance	39 laps	125 km
Pole position	Craig Lowndes; Triple Eight Race Engineering	1:20.4155
Winner	Craig Lowndes; Triple Eight Race Engineering	56:12.9270
Race 3
Distance	76 laps	245 km
Pole position	Shane van Gisbergen; Tekno Autosports	1:20.6535
Winner	James Courtney; Holden Racing Team	1:57.52.9386

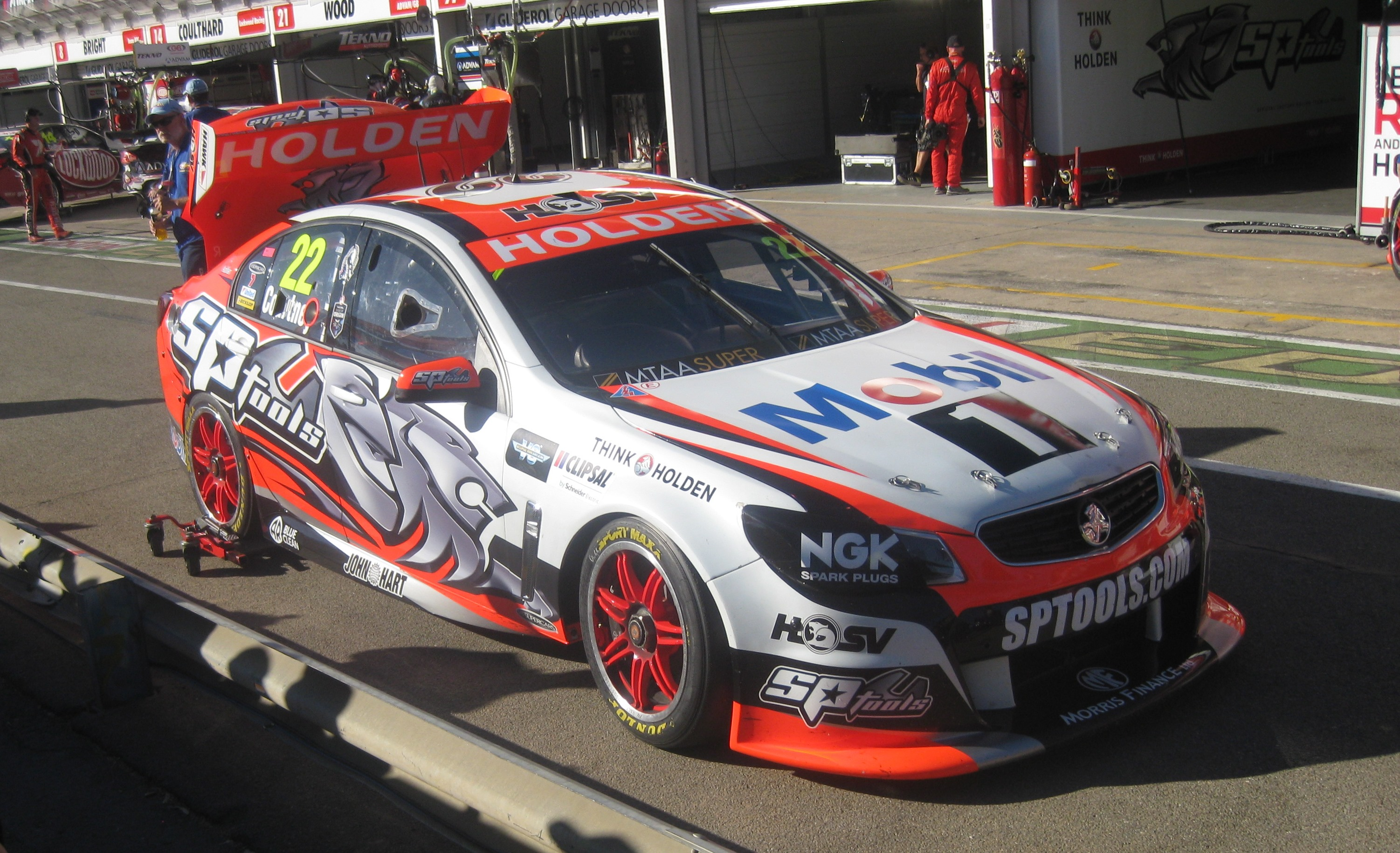
James Courtney won the 2014 Clipsal 500 Adelaide in a Holden VF Commodore

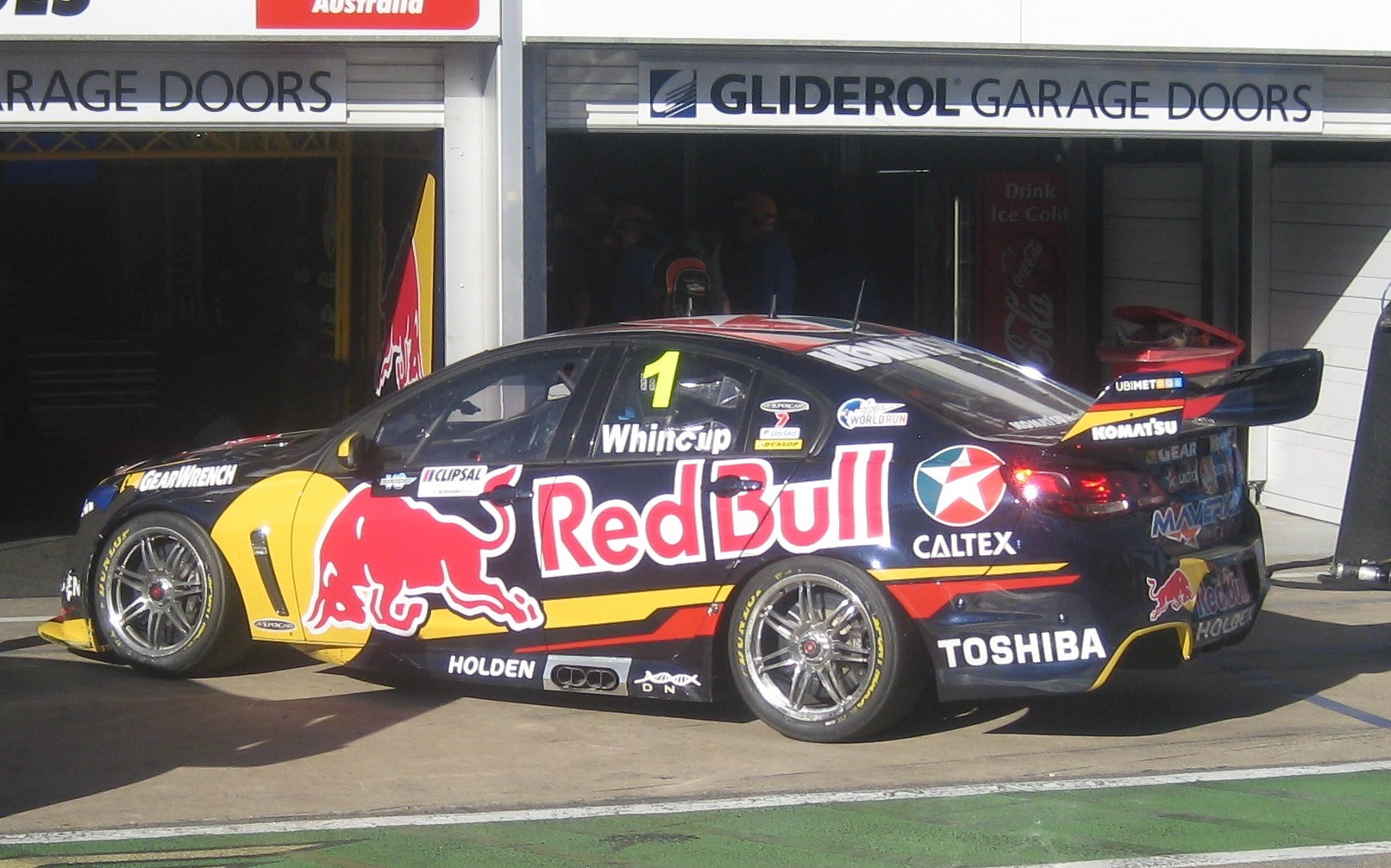
Jamie Whincup won Race 1 of the 2014 Clipsal 500 Adelaide in a Holden VF Commodore

The 2014 Clipsal 500 Adelaide was a motor race for V8 Supercars held on 1 and 2 March 2014. The event was held at the Adelaide Street Circuit in Adelaide, South Australia, and consisted of two races of 125 kilometres (78 miles) and one race of 250 kilometres (160 miles) in length. It was the first round of the 2014 International V8 Supercars Championship, and marked the racing debut of the Volvo S60 in the series.

Triple Eight Race Engineering won both of the shorter races; Jamie Whincup led home Craig Lowndes for a 1–2 in the opening race, while Lowndes took the second race victory. The weekend's longer race was taken by James Courtney of the Holden Racing Team, holding off Lowndes by 0.7 seconds. Lowndes left Adelaide with a 52-point championship lead over Brad Jones Racing's Fabian Coulthard, who took three top five placings over the weekend. Shane van Gisbergen took third for the round, taking third-place finishes in the opening and closing races.

== Report ==
=== Race 1 ===
==== Qualifying ====
Pos.	No.	Driver	Car	Team	Time
1	1	(Australia) Jamie Whincup	Holden VF Commodore	Triple Eight Race Engineering	1:20.5849
2	888	(Australia) Craig Lowndes	Holden VF Commodore	Triple Eight Race Engineering	1:20.7367
3	5	(Australia) Mark Winterbottom	Ford FG Falcon	Ford Performance Racing	1:20.8204
4	22	(Australia) James Courtney	Holden VF Commodore	Holden Racing Team	1:20.8312
5	33	(New Zealand) Scott McLaughlin	Volvo S60	Garry Rogers Motorsport	1:20.8350
6	97	(New Zealand) Shane van Gisbergen	Holden VF Commodore	Tekno Autosports	1:20.8459
7	7	(Australia) Todd Kelly	Nissan Altima L33	Nissan Motorsport	1:20.9231
8	16	(Australia) Scott Pye	Ford FG Falcon	Dick Johnson Racing	1:20.9479
9	47	(Australia) Tim Slade	Holden VF Commodore	Walkinshaw Racing	1:20.9603
10	14	(New Zealand) Fabian Coulthard	Holden VF Commodore	Brad Jones Racing	1:21.0592
11	6	(Australia) Chaz Mostert	Ford FG Falcon	Ford Performance Racing	1:21.0598
12	36	(Australia) Michael Caruso	Nissan Altima L33	Nissan Motorsport	1:21.0719
13	8	(Australia) Jason Bright	Holden VF Commodore	Brad Jones Racing	1:21.1735
14	15	(Australia) Rick Kelly	Nissan Altima L33	Nissan Motorsport	1:21.1935
15	2	(Australia) Garth Tander	Holden VF Commodore	Holden Racing Team	1:21.2250
16	4	(Australia) Lee Holdsworth	Mercedes-Benz E63 AMG	Erebus Motorsport	1:21.3285
17	360	(Australia) James Moffat	Nissan Altima L33	Nissan Motorsport	1:21.3611
18	23	(Australia) Russell Ingall	Holden VF Commodore	Lucas Dumbrell Motorsport	1:21.4766
19	21	(Australia) Dale Wood	Holden VF Commodore	Britek Motorsport	1:21.5583
20	17	(Australia) David Wall	Ford FG Falcon	Dick Johnson Racing	1:21.5764
21	34	(Sweden) Robert Dahlgren	Volvo S60	Garry Rogers Motorsport	1:21.7651
22	55	(Australia) David Reynolds	Ford FG Falcon	Rod Nash Racing	1:21.8145
23	18	(Australia) Jack Perkins	Ford FG Falcon	Charlie Schwerkolt Racing	1:22.1294
24	9	(Australia) Will Davison	Mercedes-Benz E63 AMG	Erebus Motorsport	1:22.4255
25	222	(Australia) Nick Percat	Holden VF Commodore	James Rosenberg Racing	1:23.3727

==== Race ====
Pos.	No.	Driver	Car	Team	Laps	Time/retired	Grid	Points
1	1	(Australia) Jamie Whincup	Holden VF Commodore	Triple Eight Race Engineering	39	53:57.5158	1	75
2	888	(Australia) Craig Lowndes	Holden VF Commodore	Triple Eight Race Engineering	39	+2.8 s	2	69
3	97	(New Zealand) Shane van Gisbergen	Holden VF Commodore	Tekno Autosports	39	+7.8 s	6	64
4	5	(Australia) Mark Winterbottom	Ford FG Falcon	Ford Performance Racing	39	+13.9 s	3	60
5	14	(New Zealand) Fabian Coulthard	Holden VF Commodore	Brad Jones Racing	39	+19.2 s	10	55
6	15	(Australia) Rick Kelly	Nissan Altima L33	Nissan Motorsport	39	+24.0 s	14	51
7	33	(New Zealand) Scott McLaughlin	Volvo S60	Garry Rogers Motorsport	39	+24.5 s	5	48
8	8	(Australia) Jason Bright	Holden VF Commodore	Brad Jones Racing	39	+24.7 s	13	45
9	22	(Australia) James Courtney	Holden VF Commodore	Holden Racing Team	39	+31.2 s	4	42
10	16	(Australia) Scott Pye	Ford FG Falcon	Dick Johnson Racing	39	+32.8 s	8	39
11	2	(Australia) Garth Tander	Holden VF Commodore	Holden Racing Team	39	+33.4 s	15	36
12	23	(Australia) Russell Ingall	Holden VF Commodore	Lucas Dumbrell Motorsport	39	+36.0 s	18	34
13	9	(Australia) Will Davison	Mercedes-Benz E63 AMG	Erebus Motorsport	39	+36.4 s	24	33
14	17	(Australia) David Wall	Ford FG Falcon	Dick Johnson Racing	39	+39.7 s	20	31
15	47	(Australia) Tim Slade	Holden VF Commodore	Walkinshaw Racing	39	+40.5 s	9	30
16	7	(Australia) Todd Kelly	Nissan Altima L33	Nissan Motorsport	39	+43.7 s	7	28
17	4	(Australia) Lee Holdsworth	Mercedes-Benz E63 AMG	Erebus Motorsport	39	+44.7 s	16	27
18	36	(Australia) Michael Caruso	Nissan Altima L33	Nissan Motorsport	39	+59.1 s	12	25
19	18	(Australia) Jack Perkins	Ford FG Falcon	Charlie Schwerkolt Racing	39	+59.4 s	23	24
20	360	(Australia) James Moffat	Nissan Altima L33	Nissan Motorsport	38	+1 lap	17	22
21	34	(Sweden) Robert Dahlgren	Volvo S60	Garry Rogers Motorsport	38	+1 lap	21	21
22	222	(Australia) Nick Percat	Holden VF Commodore	James Rosenberg Racing	35	+4 laps	25	19
23	21	(Australia) Dale Wood	Holden VF Commodore	Britek Motorsport	32	+7 laps	19	18
Ret	6	(Australia) Chaz Mostert	Ford FG Falcon	Ford Performance Racing	21	Accident damage	11	
Ret	55	(Australia) David Reynolds	Ford FG Falcon	Rod Nash Racing	12	Accident damage	22	

=== Race 2 ===
==== Qualifying ====
Pos.	No.	Driver	Car	Team	Time
1	888	(Australia) Craig Lowndes	Holden VF Commodore	Triple Eight Race Engineering	1:20.4155
2	33	(New Zealand) Scott McLaughlin	Volvo S60	Garry Rogers Motorsport	1:20.5258
3	1	(Australia) Jamie Whincup	Holden VF Commodore	Triple Eight Race Engineering	1:20.5699
4	8	(Australia) Jason Bright	Holden VF Commodore	Brad Jones Racing	1:20.6474
5	5	(Australia) Mark Winterbottom	Ford FG Falcon	Ford Performance Racing	1:20.6900
6	4	(Australia) Lee Holdsworth	Mercedes-Benz E63 AMG	Erebus Motorsport	1:20.7119
7	36	(Australia) Michael Caruso	Nissan Altima L33	Nissan Motorsport	1:20.7337
8	22	(Australia) James Courtney	Holden VF Commodore	Holden Racing Team	1:20.7735
9	16	(Australia) Scott Pye	Ford FG Falcon	Dick Johnson Racing	1:20.8208
10	6	(Australia) Chaz Mostert	Ford FG Falcon	Ford Performance Racing	1:20.8530
11	7	(Australia) Todd Kelly	Nissan Altima L33	Nissan Motorsport	1:20.8712
12	47	(Australia) Tim Slade	Holden VF Commodore	Walkinshaw Racing	1:20.9075
13	222	(Australia) Nick Percat	Holden VF Commodore	James Rosenberg Racing	1:20.9294
14	360	(Australia) James Moffat	Nissan Altima L33	Nissan Motorsport	1:20.9350
15	97	(New Zealand) Shane van Gisbergen	Holden VF Commodore	Tekno Autosports	1:20.9576
16	14	(New Zealand) Fabian Coulthard	Holden VF Commodore	Brad Jones Racing	1:20.9642
17	15	(Australia) Rick Kelly	Nissan Altima L33	Nissan Motorsport	1:21.0138
18	2	(Australia) Garth Tander	Holden VF Commodore	Holden Racing Team	1:21.0163
19	55	(Australia) David Reynolds	Ford FG Falcon	Rod Nash Racing	1:21.1581
20	9	(Australia) Will Davison	Mercedes-Benz E63 AMG	Erebus Motorsport	1:21.1956
21	17	(Australia) David Wall	Ford FG Falcon	Dick Johnson Racing	1:21.2844
22	18	(Australia) Jack Perkins	Ford FG Falcon	Charlie Schwerkolt Racing	1:21.3997
23	21	(Australia) Dale Wood	Holden VF Commodore	Britek Motorsport	1:21.6160
24	23	(Australia) Russell Ingall	Holden VF Commodore	Lucas Dumbrell Motorsport	1:21.7130
25	34	(Sweden) Robert Dahlgren	Volvo S60	Garry Rogers Motorsport	1:21.7925

==== Race ====
Pos.	No.	Driver	Car	Team	Laps	Time/retired	Grid	Points
1	888	(Australia) Craig Lowndes	Holden VF Commodore	Triple Eight Race Engineering	39	56:12.9270	1	75
2	33	(New Zealand) Scott McLaughlin	Volvo S60	Garry Rogers Motorsport	39	+4.7 s	2	69
3	1	(Australia) Jamie Whincup	Holden VF Commodore	Triple Eight Race Engineering	39	+5.6 s	3	64
4	5	(Australia) Mark Winterbottom	Ford FG Falcon	Ford Performance Racing	39	+14.8 s	5	60
5	14	(New Zealand) Fabian Coulthard	Holden VF Commodore	Brad Jones Racing	39	+15.0 s	16	55
6	6	(Australia) Chaz Mostert	Ford FG Falcon	Ford Performance Racing	39	+15.3 s	10	51
7	2	(Australia) Garth Tander	Holden VF Commodore	Holden Racing Team	39	+15.7 s	18	48
8	36	(Australia) Michael Caruso	Nissan Altima L33	Nissan Motorsport	39	+24.6 s	7	45
9	7	(Australia) Todd Kelly	Nissan Altima L33	Nissan Motorsport	39	+25.3 s	11	42
10	9	(Australia) Will Davison	Mercedes-Benz E63 AMG	Erebus Motorsport	39	+25.5 s	20	39
11	15	(Australia) Rick Kelly	Nissan Altima L33	Nissan Motorsport	39	+26.4 s	17	36
12	360	(Australia) James Moffat	Nissan Altima L33	Nissan Motorsport	39	+28.4 s	14	34
13	23	(Australia) Russell Ingall	Holden VF Commodore	Lucas Dumbrell Motorsport	39	+28.7 s	24	33
14	47	(Australia) Tim Slade	Holden VF Commodore	Walkinshaw Racing	39	+29.6 s	12	31
15	222	(Australia) Nick Percat	Holden VF Commodore	James Rosenberg Racing	39	+34.7 s	13	30
16	97	(New Zealand) Shane van Gisbergen	Holden VF Commodore	Tekno Autosports	39	+35.0 s	15	28
17	4	(Australia) Lee Holdsworth	Mercedes-Benz E63 AMG	Erebus Motorsport	39	+35.8 s	6	27
18	22	(Australia) James Courtney	Holden VF Commodore	Holden Racing Team	39	+37.6 s	8	25
19	55	(Australia) David Reynolds	Ford FG Falcon	Rod Nash Racing	39	+38.1 s	19	24
20	16	(Australia) Scott Pye	Ford FG Falcon	Dick Johnson Racing	39	+39.9 s	9	22
21	8	(Australia) Jason Bright	Holden VF Commodore	Brad Jones Racing	39	+45.9 s	4	21
22	18	(Australia) Jack Perkins	Ford FG Falcon	Charlie Schwerkolt Racing	39	+46.9 s	22	19
23	34	(Sweden) Robert Dahlgren	Volvo S60	Garry Rogers Motorsport	39	+48.8 s	25	18
24	21	(Australia) Dale Wood	Holden VF Commodore	Britek Motorsport	39	+1:19.2	23	16
Ret	17	(Australia) David Wall	Ford FG Falcon	Dick Johnson Racing	37	Drive shaft	21	

=== Race 3 ===
==== Qualifying ====
Pos.	No.	Driver	Car	Team	Time
1	97	(New Zealand) Shane van Gisbergen	Holden VF Commodore	Tekno Autosports	1:20.3776
2	888	(Australia) Craig Lowndes	Holden VF Commodore	Triple Eight Race Engineering	1:20.4317
3	1	(Australia) Jamie Whincup	Holden VF Commodore	Triple Eight Race Engineering	1:20.4771
4	33	(New Zealand) Scott McLaughlin	Volvo S60	Garry Rogers Motorsport	1:20.4886
5	5	(Australia) Mark Winterbottom	Ford FG Falcon	Ford Performance Racing	1:20.7507
6	2	(Australia) Garth Tander	Holden VF Commodore	Holden Racing Team	1:20.7785
7	47	(Australia) Tim Slade	Holden VF Commodore	Walkinshaw Racing	1:20.7978
8	8	(Australia) Jason Bright	Holden VF Commodore	Brad Jones Racing	1:20.8373
9	15	(Australia) Rick Kelly	Nissan Altima L33	Nissan Motorsport	1:20.8605
10	4	(Australia) Lee Holdsworth	Mercedes-Benz E63 AMG	Erebus Motorsport	1:20.8930
11	6	(Australia) Chaz Mostert	Ford FG Falcon	Ford Performance Racing	1:20.9250
12	360	(Australia) James Moffat	Nissan Altima L33	Nissan Motorsport	1:20.9329
13	222	(Australia) Nick Percat	Holden VF Commodore	James Rosenberg Racing	1:20.9414
14	7	(Australia) Todd Kelly	Nissan Altima L33	Nissan Motorsport	1:20.9683
15	22	(Australia) James Courtney	Holden VF Commodore	Holden Racing Team	1:20.9774
16	14	(New Zealand) Fabian Coulthard	Holden VF Commodore	Brad Jones Racing	1:21.0091
17	9	(Australia) Will Davison	Mercedes-Benz E63 AMG	Erebus Motorsport	1:21.0725
18	17	(Australia) David Wall	Ford FG Falcon	Dick Johnson Racing	1:21.0759
19	36	(Australia) Michael Caruso	Nissan Altima L33	Nissan Motorsport	1:21.0780
20	16	(Australia) Scott Pye	Ford FG Falcon	Dick Johnson Racing	1:21.1046
21	21	(Australia) Dale Wood	Holden VF Commodore	Britek Motorsport	1:21.1500
22	55	(Australia) David Reynolds	Ford FG Falcon	Rod Nash Racing	1:21.1953
23	18	(Australia) Jack Perkins	Ford FG Falcon	Charlie Schwerkolt Racing	1:21.2752
24	23	(Australia) Russell Ingall	Holden VF Commodore	Lucas Dumbrell Motorsport	1:21.3449
25	34	(Sweden) Robert Dahlgren	Volvo S60	Garry Rogers Motorsport	No time^{1}

Notes:
^1 — Robert Dahlgren experienced a drop in oil pressure, forcing him to stop the car. The car was unable to be repaired before the end of the qualifying session.

==== Top 10 Shootout ====
Pos.	No.	Name	Car	Team	QPos.	Time
1	97	(New Zealand) Shane van Gisbergen	Holden VF Commodore	Tekno Autosports	1	1:20.6535
2	1	(Australia) Jamie Whincup	Holden VF Commodore	Triple Eight Race Engineering	3	1:20.8421
3	2	(Australia) Garth Tander	Holden VF Commodore	Holden Racing Team	6	1:21.0115
4	15	(Australia) Rick Kelly	Nissan Altima L33	Nissan Motorsport	9	1:21.2016
5	5	(Australia) Mark Winterbottom	Ford FG Falcon	Ford Performance Racing	5	1:21.2224
6	47	(Australia) Tim Slade	Holden VF Commodore	Walkinshaw Racing	7	1:21.3774
7	888	(Australia) Craig Lowndes	Holden VF Commodore	Triple Eight Race Engineering	2	1:21.3990
8	8	(Australia) Jason Bright	Holden VF Commodore	Brad Jones Racing	8	1:21.3999
9	4	(Australia) Lee Holdsworth	Mercedes-Benz E63 AMG	Erebus Motorsport	10	1:21.6617
10	33	(New Zealand) Scott McLaughlin	Volvo S60	Garry Rogers Motorsport	4	No time^{1}

Notes:
^1 — Scott McLaughlin's time was deleted after he triggered the kerb sensor at turn 2.

==== Race ====
Pos.	No.	Driver	Car	Team	Laps	Time/retired	Grid	Points
1	22	(Australia) James Courtney	Holden VF Commodore	Holden Racing Team	76	1:57.52.9386	15	150
2	888	(Australia) Craig Lowndes	Holden VF Commodore	Triple Eight Race Engineering	76	+0.7 s	7	138
3	97	(New Zealand) Shane van Gisbergen	Holden VF Commodore	Tekno Autosports	76	+4.9 s	1	129
4	14	(New Zealand) Fabian Coulthard	Holden VF Commodore	Brad Jones Racing	76	+5.7 s	16	120
5	15	(Australia) Rick Kelly	Nissan Altima L33	Nissan Motorsport	76	+5.9 s	4	111
6	47	(Australia) Tim Slade	Holden VF Commodore	Walkinshaw Racing	76	+6.8 s	6	102
7	55	(Australia) David Reynolds	Ford FG Falcon	Rod Nash Racing	76	+7.6 s	22	96
8	17	(Australia) David Wall	Ford FG Falcon	Dick Johnson Racing	76	+8.9 s	17	90
9	360	(Australia) James Moffat	Nissan Altima L33	Nissan Motorsport	76	+10.8 s	12	84
10	21	(Australia) Dale Wood	Holden VF Commodore	Britek Motorsport	76	+32.7 s	21	78
11	18	(Australia) Jack Perkins	Ford FG Falcon	Charlie Schwerkolt Racing	75	+1 lap	23	72
12	5	(Australia) Mark Winterbottom	Ford FG Falcon	Ford Performance Racing	75	+1 lap	5	69
13	2	(Australia) Garth Tander	Holden VF Commodore	Holden Racing Team	73	+3 laps	3	66
14	36	(Australia) Michael Caruso	Nissan Altima L33	Nissan Motorsport	71	+5 laps	19	63
15	1	(Australia) Jamie Whincup	Holden VF Commodore	Triple Eight Race Engineering	68	+8 laps	2	60
16	4	(Australia) Lee Holdsworth	Mercedes-Benz E63 AMG	Erebus Motorsport	66	+10 laps	9	57
17	23	(Australia) Russell Ingall	Holden VF Commodore	Lucas Dumbrell Motorsport	60	+16 laps	24	54
Ret	222	(Australia) Nick Percat	Holden VF Commodore	James Rosenberg Racing	71	Accident	13	
Ret	33	(New Zealand) Scott McLaughlin	Volvo S60	Garry Rogers Motorsport	65	Electrical	10	
Ret	8	(Australia) Jason Bright	Holden VF Commodore	Brad Jones Racing	13	Accident	8	
Ret	16	(Australia) Scott Pye	Ford FG Falcon	Dick Johnson Racing	13	Accident	20	
Ret	6	(Australia) Chaz Mostert	Ford FG Falcon	Ford Performance Racing	13	Accident	11	
Ret	34	(Sweden) Robert Dahlgren	Volvo S60	Garry Rogers Motorsport	12	Engine	25	
Ret	9	(Australia) Will Davison	Mercedes-Benz E63 AMG	Erebus Motorsport	9	Accident	17	
Ret	7	(Australia) Todd Kelly	Nissan Altima L33	Nissan Motorsport	2	Throttle	14	

== Championship standings after the race ==
Drivers' Championship standings

Pos.	Driver	Points
1	Craig Lowndes	282
2	Fabian Coulthard	230
3	Shane van Gisbergen	221
4	Rick Kelly	198
5	James Courtney	192

Teams' Championship standings

Pos.	Constructor	Points
1	Triple Eight Race Engineering	481
2	Holden Racing Team	367
3	Brad Jones Racing	296
4	Norton Hornets Racing	273
5	Jack Daniel's Racing	268

- Note: Only the top five positions are included for both sets of standings.
