= 2018 Perth SuperSprint =

2018 V8 Supercar championship race

(Western Australia) 2018 Perth SuperSprint
Event Information
- Round 5 of 16 in the 2018 Supercars Championship
- Date: 5–6 May 2018
- Location: Wanneroo, Western Australia
- Venue: Barbagallo Raceway

Results
Race 1
Distance	50 laps	123.115 km
Pole position	(New Zealand) Scott McLaughlin; DJR Team Penske	54.6397
Winner	(New Zealand) Scott McLaughlin; DJR Team Penske	49:34.0255
Race 2
Distance	83 laps	204.371 km
Pole position	(New Zealand) Shane van Gisbergen; Triple Eight Race Engineering	54.9054
Winner	(New Zealand) Scott McLaughlin; DJR Team Penske	1:24:39.3019

The 2018 Perth SuperSprint was a motor racing event for the Supercars Championship, held on 4–6 May 2018. The event was held at Barbagallo Raceway near Wanneroo, Western Australia and consisted of two races, 120 and 200 kilometres in length. It was the fifth round of sixteen in the 2018 Supercars Championship and hosted Races 11 and 12 of the season.

== Results ==
=== Practice ===
Practice summary
Session	Day	Fastest lap				
Session	Day	No.	Driver	Team	Car	Time
Practice 1	Friday	7	(New Zealand) Andre Heimgartner	Nissan Motorsport	Nissan Altima L33	55.6825
Practice 2	Friday	17	(New Zealand) Scott McLaughlin	DJR Team Penske	Ford Falcon FG X	54.8871
Practice 3	Saturday	400	(Australia) Will Davison	23Red Racing	Ford Falcon FG X	55.2847
Practice 4	Sunday	1	(Australia) Jamie Whincup	Triple Eight Race Engineering	Holden Commodore ZB	55.2686

=== Race 11 ===
==== Qualifying ====
Pos.	No.	Name	Team	Car	Q1	Q2	Q3	Grid
1	17	(New Zealand) Scott McLaughlin	DJR Team Penske	Ford Falcon FG X		54.8838	54.6397	1
2	6	(Australia) Cam Waters	Tickford Racing	Ford Falcon FG X		55.0003	54.7123	2
3	12	(New Zealand) Fabian Coulthard	DJR Team Penske	Ford Falcon FG X		54.9499	54.7280	3
4	5	(Australia) Mark Winterbottom	Tickford Racing	Ford Falcon FG X		54.8282	54.7318	4
5	14	(Australia) Tim Slade	Brad Jones Racing	Holden Commodore ZB		54.8897	54.8034	5
6	55	(Australia) Chaz Mostert	Tickford Racing	Ford Falcon FG X		55.0243	54.8639	6
7	9	(Australia) David Reynolds	Erebus Motorsport	Holden Commodore ZB	54.9068	54.8125	54.8837	7
8	888	(Australia) Craig Lowndes	Triple Eight Race Engineering	Holden Commodore ZB	54.9155	54.9537	54.8974	8
9	99	(Australia) Anton de Pasquale	Erebus Motorsport	Holden Commodore ZB		54.9825	55.2732	9
10	400	(Australia) Will Davison	23Red Racing	Ford Falcon FG X	55.1038	54.9247	No time	10
11	2	(Australia) Scott Pye	Walkinshaw Andretti United	Holden Commodore ZB	55.1043	55.0249		11
12	97	(New Zealand) Shane van Gisbergen	Triple Eight Race Engineering	Holden Commodore ZB		55.0596		12
13	19	(Australia) Jack Le Brocq	Tekno Autosports	Holden Commodore ZB	55.2020	55.0816		13
14	1	(Australia) Jamie Whincup	Triple Eight Race Engineering	Holden Commodore ZB		55.0994		14
15	78	(Switzerland) Simona de Silvestro	Nissan Motorsport	Nissan Altima L33		55.2034		15
16	18	(Australia) Lee Holdsworth	Team 18	Holden Commodore ZB	55.2420	55.7084		16
17	56	(New Zealand) Richie Stanaway	Tickford Racing	Ford Falcon FG X	55.2538			17
18	8	(Australia) Nick Percat	Brad Jones Racing	Holden Commodore ZB	55.2559			18
19	23	(Australia) Michael Caruso	Nissan Motorsport	Nissan Altima L33	55.2711			19
20	33	(Australia) Garth Tander	Garry Rogers Motorsport	Holden Commodore ZB	55.3015			20
21	25	(Australia) James Courtney	Walkinshaw Andretti United	Holden Commodore ZB	55.3423			21
22	34	(Australia) James Golding	Garry Rogers Motorsport	Holden Commodore ZB	55.3812			22
23	7	(New Zealand) Andre Heimgartner	Nissan Motorsport	Nissan Altima L33	55.3889			23
24	21	(Australia) Tim Blanchard	Tim Blanchard Racing	Holden Commodore ZB	55.4884			24
25	35	(Australia) Todd Hazelwood	Matt Stone Racing	Ford Falcon FG X	55.5560			25
26	15	(Australia) Rick Kelly	Nissan Motorsport	Nissan Altima L33	55.6873			26

==== Race ====
Pos	No.	Driver	Team	Car	Laps	Time / Retired	Grid	Points
1	17	(New Zealand) Scott McLaughlin	DJR Team Penske	Ford Falcon FG X	50	49:34.0255	1	150
2	5	(Australia) Mark Winterbottom	Tickford Racing	Ford Falcon FG X	50	+5.6106	4	138
3	97	(New Zealand) Shane van Gisbergen	Triple Eight Race Engineering	Holden Commodore ZB	50	+8.9597	12	129
4	14	(Australia) Tim Slade	Brad Jones Racing	Holden Commodore ZB	50	+10.0175	5	120
5	888	(Australia) Craig Lowndes	Triple Eight Race Engineering	Holden Commodore ZB	50	+13.4609	8	111
6	6	(Australia) Cam Waters	Tickford Racing	Ford Falcon FG X	50	+14.9179	2	102
7	400	(Australia) Will Davison	23Red Racing	Ford Falcon FG X	50	+14.9932	10	96
8	12	(New Zealand) Fabian Coulthard	DJR Team Penske	Ford Falcon FG X	50	+15.8322	3	90
9	8	(Australia) Nick Percat	Brad Jones Racing	Holden Commodore ZB	50	+17.9624	18	84
10	55	(Australia) Chaz Mostert	Tickford Racing	Ford Falcon FG X	50	+18.3331	6	78
11	1	(Australia) Jamie Whincup	Triple Eight Race Engineering	Holden Commodore ZB	50	+18.9689^{1}	14	72
12	2	(Australia) Scott Pye	Walkinshaw Andretti United	Holden Commodore ZB	50	+20.9532	11	69
13	25	(Australia) James Courtney	Walkinshaw Andretti United	Holden Commodore ZB	50	+22.4325	21	66
14	15	(Australia) Rick Kelly	Nissan Motorsport	Nissan Altima L33	50	+25.4526	26	63
15	78	(Switzerland) Simona de Silvestro	Nissan Motorsport	Nissan Altima L33	50	+25.5602	15	60
16	19	(Australia) Jack Le Brocq	Tekno Autosports	Holden Commodore ZB	50	+28.3493	13	57
17	9	(Australia) David Reynolds	Erebus Motorsport	Holden Commodore ZB	50	+30.5328	7	54
18	99	(Australia) Anton de Pasquale	Erebus Motorsport	Holden Commodore ZB	50	+30.8667^{2}	9	51
19	33	(Australia) Garth Tander	Garry Rogers Motorsport	Holden Commodore ZB	50	+33.7106	20	48
20	23	(Australia) Michael Caruso	Nissan Motorsport	Nissan Altima L33	50	+36.4856	19	45
21	35	(Australia) Todd Hazelwood	Matt Stone Racing	Ford Falcon FG X	50	+39.6142	25	42
22	34	(Australia) James Golding	Garry Rogers Motorsport	Holden Commodore ZB	50	+40.9440	22	39
23	56	(New Zealand) Richie Stanaway	Tickford Racing	Ford Falcon FG X	50	+41.3822^{3}	17	36
24	18	(Australia) Lee Holdsworth	Team 18	Holden Commodore ZB	50	+52.3968	16	33
25	7	(New Zealand) Andre Heimgartner	Nissan Motorsport	Nissan Altima L33	49	+1 lap	23	30
NC	21	(Australia) Tim Blanchard	Tim Blanchard Racing	Holden Commodore ZB	48	Retirement	24	
Fastest lap: James Courtney (Walkinshaw Andretti United) 56.7716 (on lap 33)

Notes

- ^1– Jamie Whincup received a 5-second Time Penalty for Careless Driving, making contact with Chaz Mostert.
- ^2– Anton de Pasquale received a 10-second Time Penalty for a false start.
- ^3– Richie Stanaway received a 15-second post-race Time Penalty for Careless Driving, making contact with Lee Holdsworth.

==== Championship standings after Race 11 ====
Drivers Championship

	Pos	Driver	Pts	Gap
	1	(New Zealand) Scott McLaughlin	1097	
1	2	(New Zealand) Shane van Gisbergen	978	-119
1	3	(Australia) David Reynolds	941	-156
	4	(Australia) Craig Lowndes	924	-173
	5	(Australia) Jamie Whincup	877	-220

Teams Championship

	Pos	Team	Pts	Gap
	1	Triple Eight Race Engineering (1, 97)	1855	
	2	DJR Team Penske	1849	-6
	3	Walkinshaw Andretti United	1558	-297
1	4	Tickford Racing (5, 55)	1498	-357
1	5	Brad Jones Racing	1428	-427

- Note: Only the top five positions are included for both sets of standings.

=== Race 12 ===
==== Qualifying ====
Pos.	No.	Name	Team	Car	Q1	Q2	Q3	Grid
1	97	(New Zealand) Shane van Gisbergen	Triple Eight Race Engineering	Holden Commodore ZB		55.1869	54.9054	1
2	1	(Australia) Jamie Whincup	Triple Eight Race Engineering	Holden Commodore ZB		55.3339	54.9326	2
3	55	(Australia) Chaz Mostert	Tickford Racing	Ford Falcon FG X		55.1021	54.9891	3
4	7	(New Zealand) Andre Heimgartner	Nissan Motorsport	Nissan Altima L33		55.2682	55.0928	4
5	15	(Australia) Rick Kelly	Nissan Motorsport	Nissan Altima L33		55.3908	55.1397	5
6	9	(Australia) David Reynolds	Erebus Motorsport	Holden Commodore ZB		55.1265	55.2413	6
7	8	(Australia) Nick Percat	Brad Jones Racing	Holden Commodore ZB		55.3793	55.3384	7
8	23	(Australia) Michael Caruso	Nissan Motorsport	Nissan Altima L33	55.2943	55.3923	55.3882	8
9	25	(Australia) James Courtney	Walkinshaw Andretti United	Holden Commodore ZB	55.4374	55.1490	55.5303	9
10	19	(Australia) Jack Le Brocq	Tekno Autosports	Holden Commodore ZB	55.2816	55.3543	55.8620	10
11	21	(Australia) Tim Blanchard	Tim Blanchard Racing	Holden Commodore ZB	55.5024	55.4125		11
12	14	(Australia) Tim Slade	Brad Jones Racing	Holden Commodore ZB		55.4144		12
13	400	(Australia) Will Davison	23Red Racing	Ford Falcon FG X		55.4461		13
14	56	(New Zealand) Richie Stanaway	Tickford Racing	Ford Falcon FG X	55.4613	55.5885		14
15	2	(Australia) Scott Pye	Walkinshaw Andretti United	Holden Commodore ZB	55.4133	55.5897		15
16	34	(Australia) James Golding	Garry Rogers Motorsport	Holden Commodore ZB		55.7174		16
17	12	(New Zealand) Fabian Coulthard	DJR Team Penske	Ford Falcon FG X	55.5205			17
18	5	(Australia) Mark Winterbottom	Tickford Racing	Ford Falcon FG X	55.5337			18
19	17	(New Zealand) Scott McLaughlin	DJR Team Penske	Ford Falcon FG X	55.5971			19
20	99	(Australia) Anton de Pasquale	Erebus Motorsport	Holden Commodore ZB	55.6451			20
21	78	(Switzerland) Simona de Silvestro	Nissan Motorsport	Nissan Altima L33	55.6538			21
22	6	(Australia) Cam Waters	Tickford Racing	Ford Falcon FG X	55.6931			22
23	18	(Australia) Lee Holdsworth	Team 18	Holden Commodore ZB	55.8243			23
24	35	(Australia) Todd Hazelwood	Matt Stone Racing	Ford Falcon FG X	55.9971			24
25	888	(Australia) Craig Lowndes	Triple Eight Race Engineering	Holden Commodore ZB	56.0007			25
26	33	(Australia) Garth Tander	Garry Rogers Motorsport	Holden Commodore ZB	56.0413			26

==== Race ====
Pos	No.	Driver	Team	Car	Laps	Time / Retired	Grid	Points
1	17	(New Zealand) Scott McLaughlin	DJR Team Penske	Ford Falcon FG X	83	1:24:39.3019	19	150
2	9	(Australia) David Reynolds	Erebus Motorsport	Holden Commodore ZB	83	+7.9803	6	138
3	888	(Australia) Craig Lowndes	Triple Eight Race Engineering	Holden Commodore ZB	83	+10.6475	25	129
4	25	(Australia) James Courtney	Walkinshaw Andretti United	Holden Commodore ZB	83	+12.1611	9	120
5	97	(New Zealand) Shane van Gisbergen	Triple Eight Race Engineering	Holden Commodore ZB	83	+17.6959	1	111
6	1	(Australia) Jamie Whincup	Triple Eight Race Engineering	Holden Commodore ZB	83	+18.7972	2	102
7	8	(Australia) Nick Percat	Brad Jones Racing	Holden Commodore ZB	83	+19.9819	7	96
8	7	(New Zealand) Andre Heimgartner	Nissan Motorsport	Nissan Altima L33	83	+24.5580	4	90
9	19	(Australia) Jack Le Brocq	Tekno Autosports	Holden Commodore ZB	83	+24.9146	10	84
10	15	(Australia) Rick Kelly	Nissan Motorsport	Nissan Altima L33	83	+28.2302	5	78
11	55	(Australia) Chaz Mostert	Tickford Racing	Ford Falcon FG X	83	+31.7717	3	72
12	78	(Switzerland) Simona de Silvestro	Nissan Motorsport	Nissan Altima L33	83	+33.2297	21	69
13	6	(Australia) Cam Waters	Tickford Racing	Ford Falcon FG X	83	+33.4671	22	66
14	33	(Australia) Garth Tander	Garry Rogers Motorsport	Holden Commodore ZB	83	+33.9180	26	63
15	2	(Australia) Scott Pye	Walkinshaw Andretti United	Holden Commodore ZB	83	+41.8664	15	60
16	12	(New Zealand) Fabian Coulthard	DJR Team Penske	Ford Falcon FG X	83	+42.2748	17	57
17	14	(Australia) Tim Slade	Brad Jones Racing	Holden Commodore ZB	83	+45.0913	12	54
18	18	(Australia) Lee Holdsworth	Team 18	Holden Commodore ZB	83	+45.2739	23	51
19	56	(New Zealand) Richie Stanaway	Tickford Racing	Ford Falcon FG X	83	+48.5981	14	48
20	400	(Australia) Will Davison	23Red Racing	Ford Falcon FG X	83	+53.9249	13	45
21	5	(Australia) Mark Winterbottom	Tickford Racing	Ford Falcon FG X	82	+1 lap	18	42
22	35	(Australia) Todd Hazelwood	Matt Stone Racing	Ford Falcon FG X	82	+1 lap	24	39
23	99	(Australia) Anton de Pasquale	Erebus Motorsport	Holden Commodore ZB	82	+1 lap	20	36
24	21	(Australia) Tim Blanchard	Tim Blanchard Racing	Holden Commodore ZB	81	+2 laps	11	33
25	34	(Australia) James Golding	Garry Rogers Motorsport	Holden Commodore ZB	75	+8 laps	16	30
26	23	(Australia) Michael Caruso	Nissan Motorsport	Nissan Altima L33	68	+15 laps	8	27
Fastest lap: Tim Slade (Brad Jones Racing) 56.4439 (on lap 63)

==== Championship standings after Race 12 ====
Drivers Championship

Pos	Driver	Pts	Gap
1	(New Zealand) Scott McLaughlin	1247	
2	(New Zealand) Shane van Gisbergen	1089	-158
3	(Australia) David Reynolds	1079	-168
4	(Australia) Craig Lowndes	1053	-194
5	(Australia) Jamie Whincup	979	-268

Teams Championship

Pos	Team	Pts	Gap
1	Triple Eight Race Engineering (1, 97)	2068	
2	DJR Team Penske	2056	-12
3	Walkinshaw Andretti United	1738	-330
4	Tickford Racing (5, 55)	1612	-456
5	Brad Jones Racing	1578	-490

- Note: Only the top five positions are included for both sets of standings.
