= 2018 Townsville 400 =

2018 V8 Supercar championship race

(Queensland) 2018 Townsville 400
Event Information
- Round 8 of 16 in the 2018 Supercars Championship
- Date: 6–8 July 2018
- Location: Townsville, Queensland
- Venue: Townsville Street Circuit

Results
Race 1
Distance	70 laps	200.524 km
Pole position	(New Zealand) Scott McLaughlin; DJR Team Penske	1:12.1239
Winner	(Australia) Jamie Whincup; Triple Eight Race Engineering	1:30:53.1102
Race 2
Distance	70 laps	200.524 km
Pole position	(New Zealand) Shane van Gisbergen; Triple Eight Race Engineering	1:12.1042
Winner	(New Zealand) Shane van Gisbergen; Triple Eight Race Engineering	1:31:05.6781

The 2018 Townsville 400 (formally known as 2018 Watpac Townsville 400) was a motor racing event for the Supercars Championship, held on the weekend of 6–8 July 2018. The event was held at Townsville Street Circuit near Townsville, Queensland and consisted of two races, both 200 kilometres in length. It was the eighth event of sixteen in the 2018 Supercars Championship and hosted Races 17 and 18 of the season.

== Results ==
=== Practice ===
Practice summary
Session	Day	Fastest lap				
Session	Day	No.	Driver	Team	Car	Time
Practice 1	Friday	97	(New Zealand) Shane van Gisbergen	Triple Eight Race Engineering	Holden Commodore ZB	1:12.6700
Practice 2	Friday	1	(Australia) Jamie Whincup	Triple Eight Race Engineering	Holden Commodore ZB	1:12.2435

=== Race 17 ===
==== Qualifying ====
Pos.	No.	Name	Team	Car	Time	Gap	Grid
1	17	(New Zealand) Scott McLaughlin	DJR Team Penske	Ford Falcon FG X	1:12.1239		1
2	1	(Australia) Jamie Whincup	Triple Eight Race Engineering	Holden Commodore ZB	1:12.1791	+0.0552	2
3	97	(New Zealand) Shane van Gisbergen	Triple Eight Race Engineering	Holden Commodore ZB	1:12.2319	+0.1080	3
4	9	(Australia) David Reynolds	Erebus Motorsport	Holden Commodore ZB	1:12.2795	+0.1556	4
5	888	(Australia) Craig Lowndes	Triple Eight Race Engineering	Holden Commodore ZB	1:12.3892	+0.2653	5
6	5	(Australia) Mark Winterbottom	Tickford Racing	Ford Falcon FG X	1:12.4036	+0.2797	6
7	14	(Australia) Tim Slade	Brad Jones Racing	Holden Commodore ZB	1:12.5121	+0.3882	7
8	230	(Australia) Will Davison	23Red Racing	Ford Falcon FG X	1:12.5828	+0.4589	8
9	12	(New Zealand) Fabian Coulthard	DJR Team Penske	Ford Falcon FG X	1:12.5829	+0.4590	9
10	15	(Australia) Rick Kelly	Nissan Motorsport	Nissan Altima L33	1:12.6118	+0.4879	10
11	8	(Australia) Nick Percat	Brad Jones Racing	Holden Commodore ZB	1:12.6684	+0.5445	11
12	99	(Australia) Anton de Pasquale	Erebus Motorsport	Holden Commodore ZB	1:12.7032	+0.5793	12
13	6	(Australia) Cam Waters	Tickford Racing	Ford Falcon FG X	1:12.7095	+0.5856	13
14	25	(Australia) James Courtney	Walkinshaw Andretti United	Holden Commodore ZB	1:12.7367	+0.6128	14
15	33	(Australia) Garth Tander	Garry Rogers Motorsport	Holden Commodore ZB	1:12.7510	+0.6271	15
16	56	(New Zealand) Richie Stanaway	Tickford Racing	Ford Falcon FG X	1:12.7808	+0.6569	16
17	55	(Australia) Chaz Mostert	Tickford Racing	Ford Falcon FG X	1:12.7834	+0.6595	17
18	19	(Australia) Jack Le Brocq	Tekno Autosports	Holden Commodore ZB	1:12.8893	+0.7654	18
19	2	(Australia) Scott Pye	Walkinshaw Andretti United	Holden Commodore ZB	1:12.9366	+0.8127	19
20	18	(Australia) Lee Holdsworth	Team 18	Holden Commodore ZB	1:12.9886	+0.8647	20
21	7	(New Zealand) Andre Heimgartner	Nissan Motorsport	Nissan Altima L33	1:13.0088	+0.8849	21
22	35	(Australia) Todd Hazelwood	Matt Stone Racing	Ford Falcon FG X	1:13.0759	+0.9520	22
23	78	(Switzerland) Simona de Silvestro	Nissan Motorsport	Nissan Altima L33	1:13.0986	+0.9747	23
24	34	(Australia) James Golding	Garry Rogers Motorsport	Holden Commodore ZB	1:13.1605	+1.0366	24
25	21	(Australia) Tim Blanchard	Tim Blanchard Racing	Holden Commodore ZB	1:13.1925	+1.0686	25
26	23	(Australia) Michael Caruso	Nissan Motorsport	Nissan Altima L33	1:13.4843	+1.3604	26

==== Race ====
Pos	No.	Driver	Team	Car	Laps	Time / Retired	Grid	Points
1	1	(Australia) Jamie Whincup	Triple Eight Race Engineering	Holden Commodore ZB	70	1:30:53.1102	2	150
2	97	(New Zealand) Shane van Gisbergen	Triple Eight Race Engineering	Holden Commodore ZB	70	+2.1945	3	138
3	17	(New Zealand) Scott McLaughlin	DJR Team Penske	Ford Falcon FG X	70	+4.9330	1	129
4	888	(Australia) Craig Lowndes	Triple Eight Race Engineering	Holden Commodore ZB	70	+6.2165	5	120
5	12	(New Zealand) Fabian Coulthard	DJR Team Penske	Ford Falcon FG X	70	+6.9920	9	111
6	5	(Australia) Mark Winterbottom	Tickford Racing	Ford Falcon FG X	70	+12.3901	6	102
7	9	(Australia) David Reynolds	Erebus Motorsport	Holden Commodore ZB	70	+14.0425	4	96
8	6	(Australia) Cam Waters	Tickford Racing	Ford Falcon FG X	70	+14.5600	13	90
9	230	(Australia) Will Davison	23Red Racing	Ford Falcon FG X	70	+15.0048	8	84
10	8	(Australia) Nick Percat	Brad Jones Racing	Holden Commodore ZB	70	+16.3005	11	78
11	14	(Australia) Tim Slade	Brad Jones Racing	Holden Commodore ZB	70	+16.7695	7	72
12	7	(New Zealand) Andre Heimgartner	Nissan Motorsport	Nissan Altima L33	70	+17.8599	21	69
13	55	(Australia) Chaz Mostert	Tickford Racing	Ford Falcon FG X	70	+19.0634	17	66
14	2	(Australia) Scott Pye	Walkinshaw Andretti United	Holden Commodore ZB	70	+20.5204	19	63
15	15	(Australia) Rick Kelly	Nissan Motorsport	Nissan Altima L33	70	+23.5679	10	60
16	34	(Australia) James Golding	Garry Rogers Motorsport	Holden Commodore ZB	70	+29.4413	24	57
17	25	(Australia) James Courtney	Walkinshaw Andretti United	Holden Commodore ZB	70	+29.5048	14	54
18	18	(Australia) Lee Holdsworth	Team 18	Holden Commodore ZB	70	+30.1462	20	51
19	99	(Australia) Anton de Pasquale	Erebus Motorsport	Holden Commodore ZB	70	+31.1569	12	48
20	35	(Australia) Todd Hazelwood	Matt Stone Racing	Ford Falcon FG X	70	+33.0034	22	45
21	33	(Australia) Garth Tander	Garry Rogers Motorsport	Holden Commodore ZB	70	+39.8782^{1}	15	42
22	19	(Australia) Jack Le Brocq	Tekno Autosports	Holden Commodore ZB	70	+1:07.3536	18	39
23	56	(New Zealand) Richie Stanaway	Tickford Racing	Ford Falcon FG X	70	+1:11.8584	16	36
24	21	(Australia) Tim Blanchard	Tim Blanchard Racing	Holden Commodore ZB	69	+1 lap	25	33
25	78	(Switzerland) Simona de Silvestro	Nissan Motorsport	Nissan Altima L33	69	+1 lap	23	30
DNS	23	(Australia) Michael Caruso	Nissan Motorsport	Nissan Altima L33	0	Did not start	26	
Fastest lap: Chaz Mostert (Tickford Racing) 1:13.2875 (on lap 26)

Notes

- ^1– Garth Tander received a 15-second post-race Time Penalty for Careless Driving, causing an incident along with James Courtney, Chaz Mostert and Anton de Pasquale.

==== Championship standings after Race 17 ====
Drivers Championship

	Pos	Driver	Pts	Gap
	1	(New Zealand) Scott McLaughlin	1904	
	2	(New Zealand) Shane van Gisbergen	1752	-152
	3	(Australia) David Reynolds	1544	-360
1	4	(Australia) Jamie Whincup	1492	-412
1	5	(Australia) Craig Lowndes	1482	-422

Teams Championship

Pos	Team	Pts	Gap
1	DJR Team Penske	3244	
2	Triple Eight Race Engineering (1, 97)	3244	-0
3	Walkinshaw Andretti United	2500	-744
4	Erebus Motorsport	2344	-900
5	Brad Jones Racing	2325	-919

- Note: Only the top five positions are included for both sets of standings.

=== Race 18 ===
==== Qualifying ====
Pos.	No.	Name	Team	Car	Time	Gap	Grid
1	97	(New Zealand) Shane van Gisbergen	Triple Eight Race Engineering	Holden Commodore ZB	1:12.2587		Top 10
2	17	(New Zealand) Scott McLaughlin	DJR Team Penske	Ford Falcon FG X	1:12.4335	+0.1748	Top 10
3	1	(Australia) Jamie Whincup	Triple Eight Race Engineering	Holden Commodore ZB	1:12.4759	+0.2172	Top 10
4	15	(Australia) Rick Kelly	Nissan Motorsport	Nissan Altima L33	1:12.4939	+0.2352	Top 10
5	9	(Australia) David Reynolds	Erebus Motorsport	Holden Commodore ZB	1:12.6686	+0.4099	Top 10
6	230	(Australia) Will Davison	23Red Racing	Ford Falcon FG X	1:12.7161	+0.4574	Top 10
7	25	(Australia) James Courtney	Walkinshaw Andretti United	Holden Commodore ZB	1:12.7911	+0.5324	Top 10
8	888	(Australia) Craig Lowndes	Triple Eight Race Engineering	Holden Commodore ZB	1:12.8020	+0.5433	Top 10
9	2	(Australia) Scott Pye	Walkinshaw Andretti United	Holden Commodore ZB	1:12.8071	+0.5484	Top 10
10	8	(Australia) Nick Percat	Brad Jones Racing	Holden Commodore ZB	1:12.8349	+0.5762	Top 10
11	23	(Australia) Michael Caruso	Nissan Motorsport	Nissan Altima L33	1:12.8366	+0.5779	11
12	55	(Australia) Chaz Mostert	Tickford Racing	Ford Falcon FG X	1:12.8497	+0.5910	12
13	5	(Australia) Mark Winterbottom	Tickford Racing	Ford Falcon FG X	1:12.9278	+0.6691	13
14	7	(New Zealand) Andre Heimgartner	Nissan Motorsport	Nissan Altima L33	1:12.9411	+0.6824	14
15	14	(Australia) Tim Slade	Brad Jones Racing	Holden Commodore ZB	1:12.9440	+0.6853	15
16	78	(Switzerland) Simona de Silvestro	Nissan Motorsport	Nissan Altima L33	1:12.9585	+0.6998	16
17	18	(Australia) Lee Holdsworth	Team 18	Holden Commodore ZB	1:13.0011	+0.7424	17
18	12	(New Zealand) Fabian Coulthard	DJR Team Penske	Ford Falcon FG X	1:13.0665	+0.8078	18
19	19	(Australia) Jack Le Brocq	Tekno Autosports	Holden Commodore ZB	1:13.1097	+0.8510	19
20	6	(Australia) Cam Waters	Tickford Racing	Ford Falcon FG X	1:13.1526	+0.8939	20
21	56	(New Zealand) Richie Stanaway	Tickford Racing	Ford Falcon FG X	1:13.1832	+0.9245	21
22	35	(Australia) Todd Hazelwood	Matt Stone Racing	Ford Falcon FG X	1:13.2003	+0.9416	22
23	21	(Australia) Tim Blanchard	Tim Blanchard Racing	Holden Commodore ZB	1:13.2958	+1.0371	23
24	34	(Australia) James Golding	Garry Rogers Motorsport	Holden Commodore ZB	1:13.4033	+1.1446	24
25	33	(Australia) Garth Tander	Garry Rogers Motorsport	Holden Commodore ZB	1:13.4606	+1.2019	25
26	99	(Australia) Anton de Pasquale	Erebus Motorsport	Holden Commodore ZB	No time^{1}	–	26

Notes

- ^1– Anton de Pasquale, for causing a Red Flag, had his best lap-time deleted and not permitted to take any further part in qualifying.

==== Top 10 Shootout ====
Pos.	No.	Driver	Team	Car	Time	Gap	Grid
1	97	(New Zealand) Shane van Gisbergen	Triple Eight Race Engineering	Holden Commodore ZB	1:12.1042		1
2	1	(Australia) Jamie Whincup	Triple Eight Race Engineering	Holden Commodore ZB	1:12.3386	+0.2344	2
3	15	(Australia) Rick Kelly	Nissan Motorsport	Nissan Altima L33	1:12.4532	+0.3490	3
4	9	(Australia) David Reynolds	Erebus Motorsport	Holden Commodore ZB	1:12.4931	+0.3889	4
5	230	(Australia) Will Davison	23Red Racing	Ford Falcon FG X	1:12.5395	+0.4353	5
6	888	(Australia) Craig Lowndes	Triple Eight Race Engineering	Holden Commodore ZB	1:12.6230	+0.5188	6
7	17	(New Zealand) Scott McLaughlin	DJR Team Penske	Ford Falcon FG X	1:12.6238	+0.5196	7
8	8	(Australia) Nick Percat	Brad Jones Racing	Holden Commodore ZB	1:12.9139	+0.8097	8
9	25	(Australia) James Courtney	Walkinshaw Andretti United	Holden Commodore ZB	1:12.9960	+0.8918	9
10	2	(Australia) Scott Pye	Walkinshaw Andretti United	Holden Commodore ZB	1:13.0275	+0.9233	10

==== Race ====
Pos	No.	Driver	Team	Car	Laps	Time / Retired	Grid	Points
1	97	(New Zealand) Shane van Gisbergen	Triple Eight Race Engineering	Holden Commodore ZB	70	1:31:05.6781	1	150
2	1	(Australia) Jamie Whincup	Triple Eight Race Engineering	Holden Commodore ZB	70	+0.7821	2	138
3	17	(New Zealand) Scott McLaughlin	DJR Team Penske	Ford Falcon FG X	70	+8.5334	7	129
4	888	(Australia) Craig Lowndes	Triple Eight Race Engineering	Holden Commodore ZB	70	+9.3114	6	120
5	55	(Australia) Chaz Mostert	Tickford Racing	Ford Falcon FG X	70	+9.8768	12	111
6	9	(Australia) David Reynolds	Erebus Motorsport	Holden Commodore ZB	70	+11.2776	4	102
7	15	(Australia) Rick Kelly	Nissan Motorsport	Nissan Altima L33	70	+13.1818	3	96
8	12	(New Zealand) Fabian Coulthard	DJR Team Penske	Ford Falcon FG X	70	+13.4090	18	90
9	6	(Australia) Cam Waters	Tickford Racing	Ford Falcon FG X	70	+14.1018	20	84
10	25	(Australia) James Courtney	Walkinshaw Andretti United	Holden Commodore ZB	70	+15.2330	9	78
11	7	(New Zealand) Andre Heimgartner	Nissan Motorsport	Nissan Altima L33	70	+17.1253	14	72
12	5	(Australia) Mark Winterbottom	Tickford Racing	Ford Falcon FG X	70	+17.4243	13	69
13	8	(Australia) Nick Percat	Brad Jones Racing	Holden Commodore ZB	70	+17.8260	8	66
14	14	(Australia) Tim Slade	Brad Jones Racing	Holden Commodore ZB	70	+18.7291	15	63
15	18	(Australia) Lee Holdsworth	Team 18	Holden Commodore ZB	70	+19.1597	17	60
16	34	(Australia) James Golding	Garry Rogers Motorsport	Holden Commodore ZB	70	+19.6907	24	57
17	99	(Australia) Anton de Pasquale	Erebus Motorsport	Holden Commodore ZB	70	+21.5806	26	54
18	19	(Australia) Jack Le Brocq	Tekno Autosports	Holden Commodore ZB	70	+31.3997^{1}	19	51
19	33	(Australia) Garth Tander	Garry Rogers Motorsport	Holden Commodore ZB	69	+1 lap	25	48
20	56	(New Zealand) Richie Stanaway	Tickford Racing	Ford Falcon FG X	69	+1 lap	21	45
21	2	(Australia) Scott Pye	Walkinshaw Andretti United	Holden Commodore ZB	69	+1 lap	10	42
22	78	(Switzerland) Simona de Silvestro	Nissan Motorsport	Nissan Altima L33	69	+1 lap	16	39
23	35	(Australia) Todd Hazelwood	Matt Stone Racing	Ford Falcon FG X	69	+1 lap	22	36
24	21	(Australia) Tim Blanchard	Tim Blanchard Racing	Holden Commodore ZB	69	+1 lap	23	33
NC	230	(Australia) Will Davison	23Red Racing	Ford Falcon FG X	67	Crash	5	
NC	23	(Australia) Michael Caruso	Nissan Motorsport	Nissan Altima L33	60	Crash	11	
Fastest lap: Scott McLaughlin (DJR Team Penske) 1:13.3515 (on lap 15)

Notes

- ^1– Jack Le Brocq received a 15-second post-race Time Penalty for Careless Driving, causing contact with Will Davison.

==== Championship standings after Race 18 ====
Drivers' Championship standings

Pos	Driver	Pts	Gap
1	(New Zealand) Scott McLaughlin	2033	
2	(New Zealand) Shane van Gisbergen	1902	-131
3	(Australia) David Reynolds	1646	-387
4	(Australia) Jamie Whincup	1630	-403
5	(Australia) Craig Lowndes	1602	-431

Teams Championship

	Pos	Team	Pts	Gap
1	1	Triple Eight Race Engineering (1, 97)	3532	
1	2	DJR Team Penske	3463	-69
	3	Walkinshaw Andretti United	2620	-912
	4	Erebus Motorsport	2500	-1032
1	5	Tickford Racing (5, 55)	2458	-1074

- Note: Only the top five positions are included for both sets of standings.
