= Kelly Racing =

Australian motor racing team

Kelly Grove Racing
- Team Principal: Rick and Todd Kelly, Brenton Grove
- Debut: 2009
- Final Season: 2021
- Round wins: 1
- Pole positions: 6
- 2020 position: 9th (2760 pts)

Kelly Racing (formerly known as Kelly Grove Racing and Nissan Motorsport) was an Australian motor racing team which competed in the Dunlop Super2 Series. The team withdrew from Dunlop Super2 Series at the conclusion of 2025. It formerly competed in the Supercars Championship from 2009 to 2021. The team made its debut in 2009, and raced Holden VE Commodores until the end of the 2012 season. In 2013, the team switched to competing with Nissan Altimas, and was rebranded Nissan Motorsport.

Following the Nissan sponsorship concluding, the team was rebranded back to Kelly Racing in 2019. For 2020 Kelly Racing campaigned two Ford Mustang GTs in the championship. The team is based in the Melbourne suburb of Braeside.

In 2019, the team expanded into the new TCR Australia Touring Car Series, running another four cars, a pair each of Opel Astra TCRs branded as Holden Astras and Subaru WRX STI TCRs. In 2021, the team was rebranded Kelly Grove Racing after the Grove Group bought a majority shareholding in the team.

Former Kelly Racing logo

Former Nismo logo

== Introduction ==
Despite some initial hurdles, the team was formed in 2009, after several months of preparation. The two sons of the owners, Rick and Todd were lead drivers for 2009, with sponsorship from Jack Daniel's. Jack Perkins and Dale Wood (though later replaced by Mark McNally), were confirmed as drivers of the third and fourth Kelly Racing entries.

== Formation ==
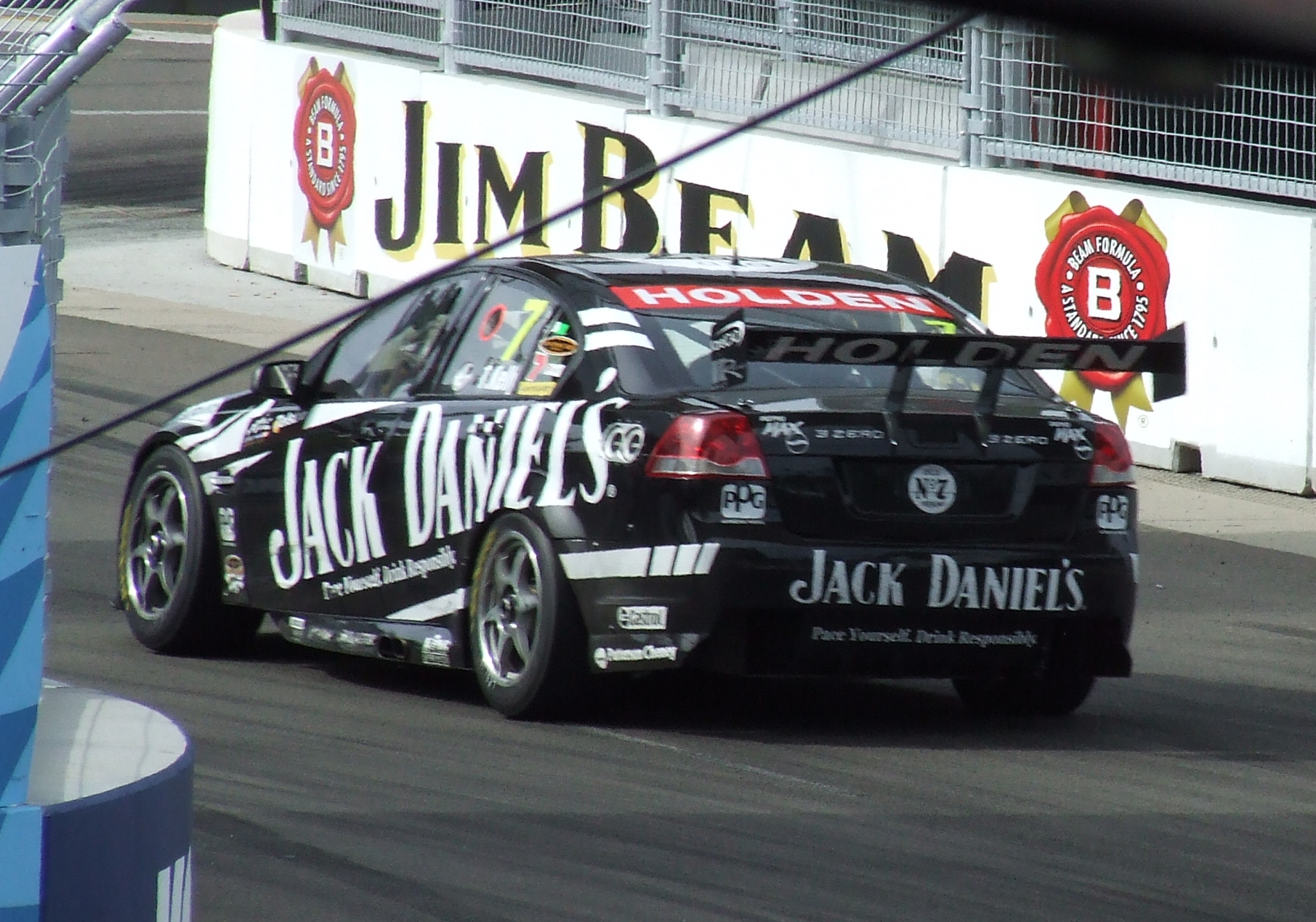
The Holden VE Commodore of Todd Kelly at the Sydney 500 in December 2009.

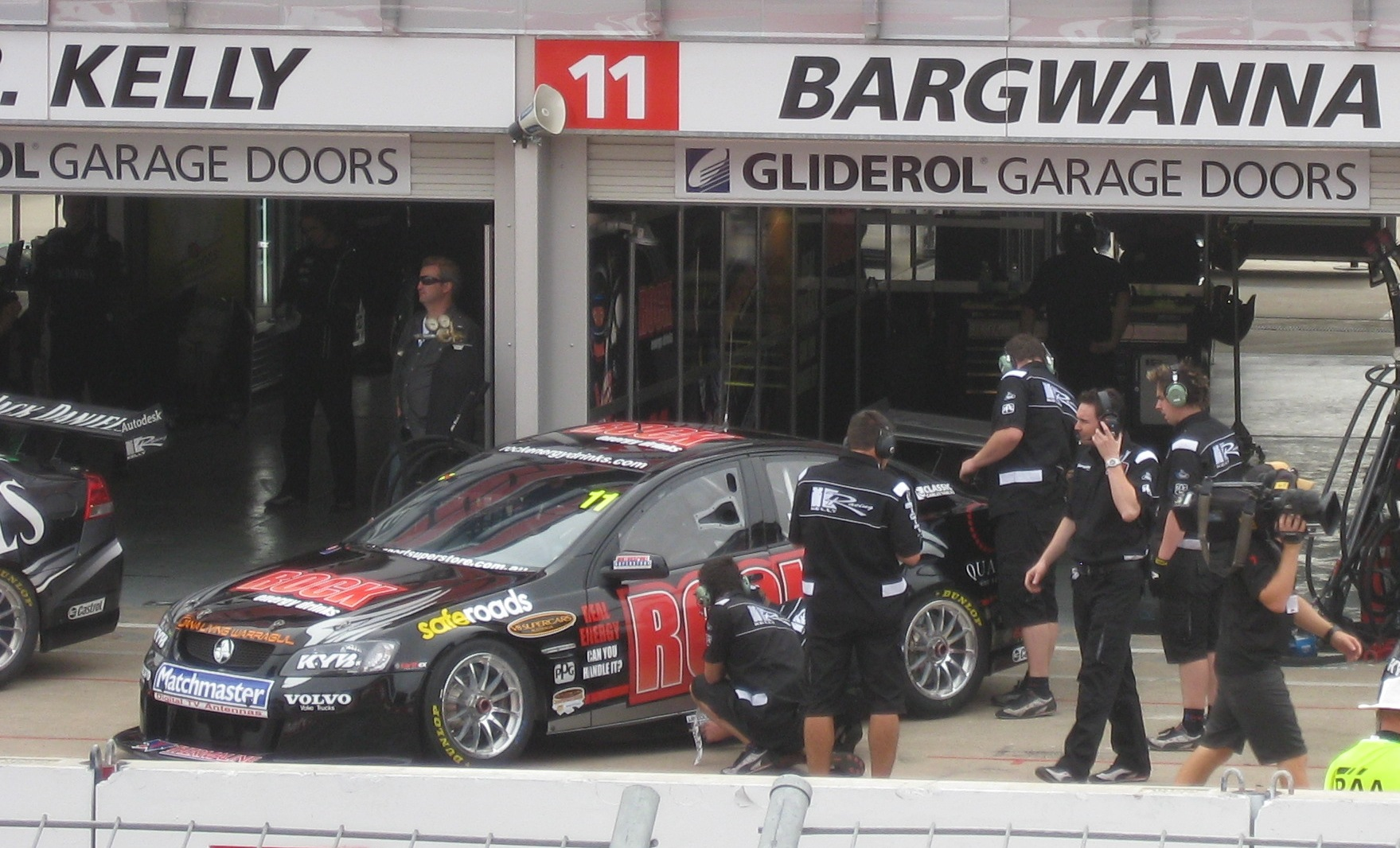
The Holden VE Commodore of Jason Bargwanna at the 2010 Clipsal 500.

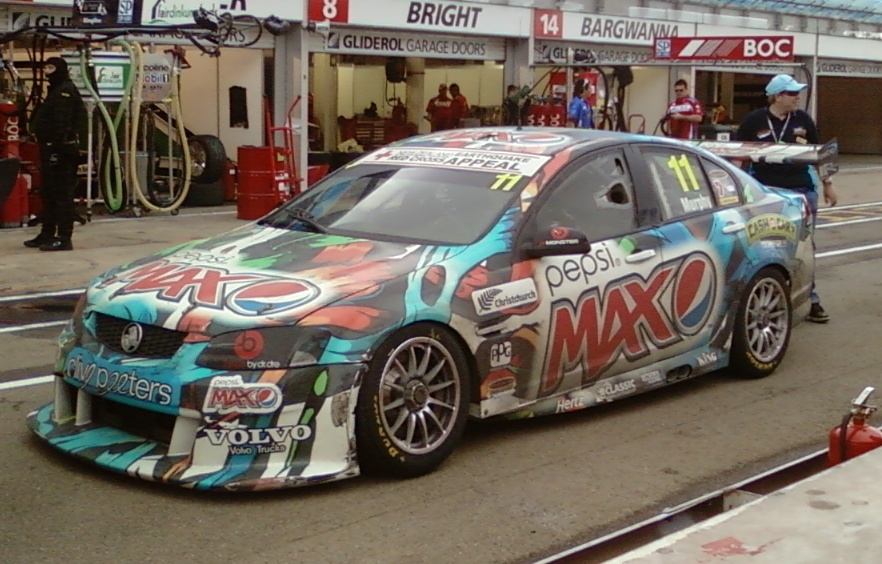
The Holden VE Commodore of Greg Murphy at the 2011 Clipsal 500.

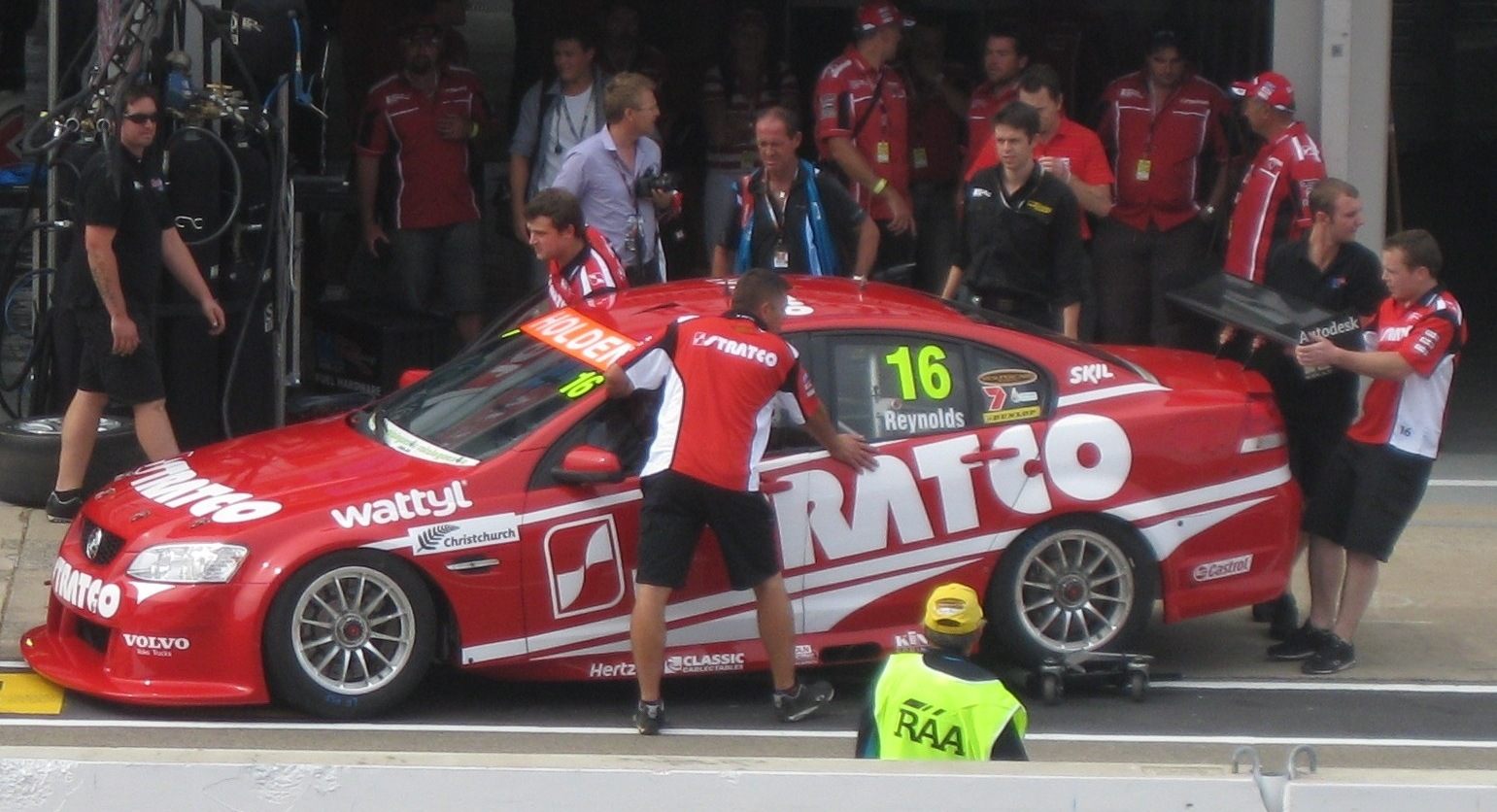
The Holden VE Commodore of David Reynolds at the 2011 Clipsal 500 Adelaide.

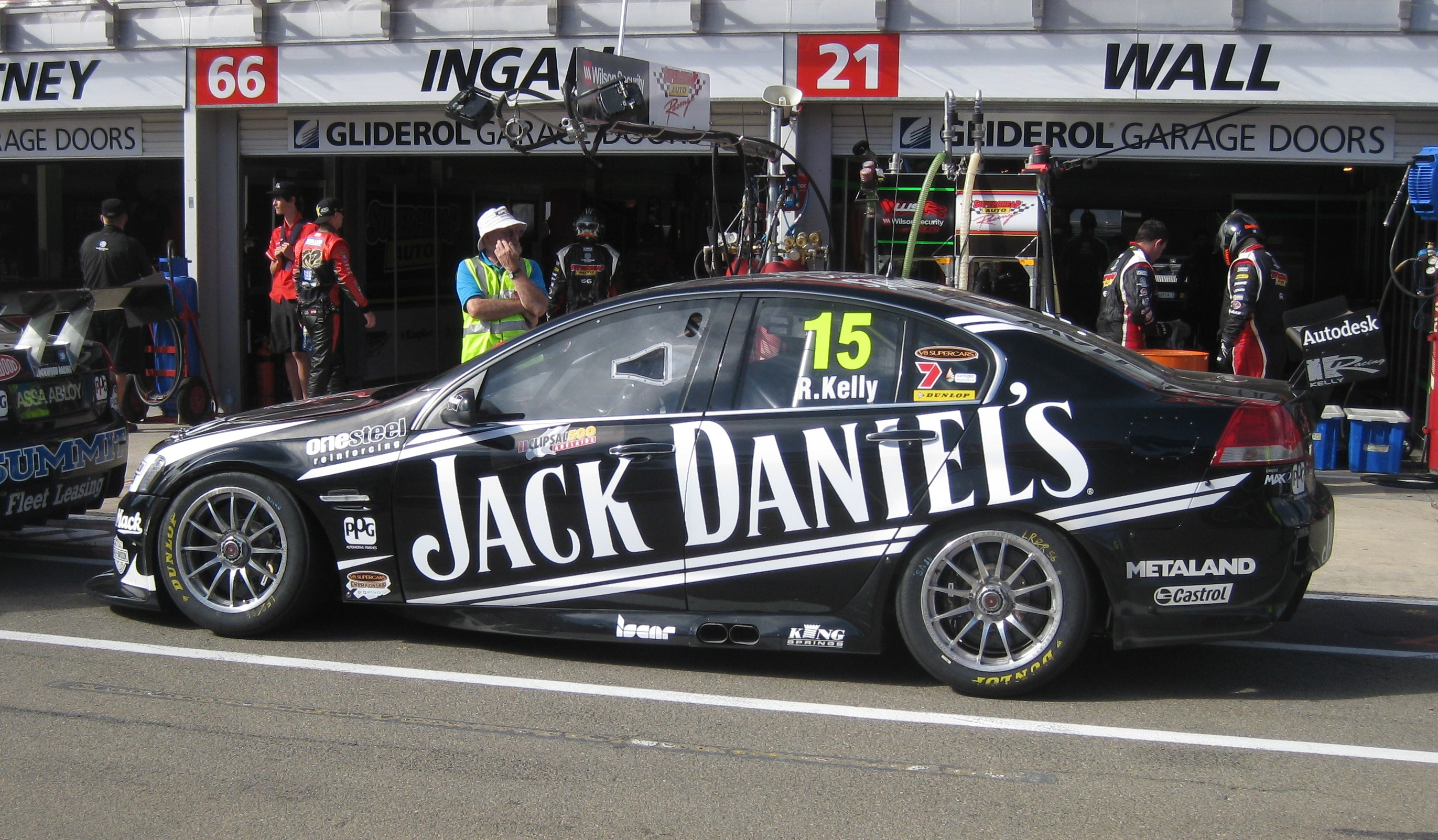
The Holden VE Commodore of Rick Kelly at the 2012 Clipsal 500.

After a troubled relationship with Tom Walkinshaw, with whom they formed the HSV Dealer Team, team principals John and Margaret Kelly took their two V8 Supercar Racing Entitlement Contracts (RECs) to set up Kelly Racing, forcing Walkinshaw to find other RECs to run his second team in the championship.

With a decision by Holden to reduce support for most teams running their Commodore product in the series for 2009, along with the impending economic crisis, Larry Perkins chose to scale back his involvement in the sport through his Perkins Engineering team at the end of 2008. A deal was concluded that saw Perkins Engineering sell much of its hardware including cars to the new team, as well as provide engineering services with the functions gradually to be transferred to Kelly Racing. Many of the former Perkins Engineering staff transferred to Kelly Racing. Perkins also retained ownership of his RECs and was thus the entrant for the team's third and fourth cars.

Racing numbers were swapped so that the Kelly owned licences could make use of the #7 racing number, to suit major sponsor Jack Daniel's and their "Old Number 7" brand. This sponsorship had been carried over from Perkins Engineering, where Todd Kelly was previously using the #7 racing number.

=== 2009 ===
The new team had its track debut at Winton Raceway on 3 March 2009, running the allowed 20-lap shakedown test for newly constructed cars in the V8 Supercar category, which was declared a success by both Todd and Rick. Following this initial shakedown, the team appeared at the official category test day at the same circuit on 9 March 2009, where all four cars appeared.

The team's first race was the 2009 Clipsal 500. The two Kelly brothers finished in the top ten in the first race, Todd in 7th and Rick in 10th, after starting 24th and 17th respectively. Wood, who did not set a qualifying time after a crash in practice, finished 14th after starting from pitlane. Perkins failed to finish due to badly damaged steering caused by brushing the wall. Rick was the only one of the four drivers to finish the second race, again in 10th place. Todd Kelly and Jack Perkins both inflicted steering damage from contact with other cars while Dale Wood spun into the wall. The team left the weekend with Rick Kelly 8th in the championship standings, Todd Kelly in 16th, Dale Wood in 24th and Jack Perkins in 30th. Todd made the following comment on the team's first weekend: "Getting an event under our belt, we've now got pages and pages of things we need to address and improve on. This is our first race as a brand new team so given that, I think the weekend wasn't too bad."

Todd and Rick achieved numerous top ten results as the season went on, the best being Rick's 4th places at Winton and Hidden Valley, while Perkins and Wood struggled. Wood was replaced by Mark McNally from the Townsville round onwards.

Todd and Rick teamed up in the #7 car for the endurances races at Phillip Island and Bathurst with Nathan Pretty and Ben Collins driving the #15 car. Dale Wood returned to the driving seat to partner Jack Perkins in the #11 car while Tony Ricciardello joined Mark McNally in the #16 car. The Kelly brothers finished fifth in the L&H 500 after Todd won one of the qualifying races. Bet 24/7 came on board as major sponsor for the #11 car before Bathurst, with Perkins and Wood running #247 for the Bathurst weekend. Todd and Rick Kelly were running in second place with only a handful of laps to go in the Bathurst 1000, but a damaged rear wing and a late safety car led to the brothers finishing in eighth place.

Perkins reverted to #11 for the remainder of the season. The team scored its first podium finish at the Island 300, which turned out to be the first in a hat-trick of podiums for the team, with Rick finishing third and second at Phillip Island and Todd finishing second in race one at Barbagallo. The final championship standings saw Rick Kelly finish in eighth, Todd Kelly in 18th, Jack Perkins in 26th, Dale Wood in 29th and Mark McNally in 30th. Jack Daniel's Racing (#7 and #15) finished sixth in teams' championship with Kelly Racing (#11 and #16) in 13th and last of the two car teams.

=== 2010 ===
In 2010 Jason Bargwanna and Tony Ricciardello joined the team.

Rick took the team's first pole position at Winton but did not manage a win. Only one podium result came out of 2010, Rick finishing third in the rain-affected first race of the Sydney 500.

For the endurance races, Rick and Todd were not allowed to pair up due to new regulations regarding endurance co-drivers. Owen Kelly, of no relation to the two brothers, joined Rick in the #15 car while Dale Wood drove with Todd. Ricciardello was partnered by Taz Douglas while two-time Australian touring car champion Glenn Seton partnered Bargwanna. Rick and Owen had a strong run at the Phillip Island 500, finishing fourth after needing to conserve fuel at the end of the race, while the other three cars all finished outside the top fifteen. The team had a disappointing Bathurst, with none of the cars finishing in the top ten, the best result 16th place for Rick and Owen.

The team hired Scott Dixon and Alex Tagliani as its international drivers for the Gold Coast 600, Dixon driving with Todd Kelly and Tagliani with Bargwanna. Owen Kelly remained with Rick and Wood moved into the #16 car with Ricciardello. It proved to be another average weekend, with Rick and Owen again providing the best result, a sixth place in race two.

The final championship standings saw Rick and Todd repeat their 2009 efforts, finishing eighth and 18th respectively. Bargwanna ended up 24th and Ricciardello was 26th. Jack Daniel's Racing was fifth in the teams' championship and Kelly Racing was 11th.

=== 2011 ===
The Jack Daniel's Racing drivers remained the same for 2011, but two new drivers were hired for Kelly Racing, Greg Murphy and David Reynolds.

2011 was the team's most successful season to date. Rick Kelly scored the team's first race win in wet conditions at the Hamilton 400. Todd made it an extra special day by finishing in third place despite having a broken windscreen wiper. Rick won a further two races, with a win in Darwin at Hidden Valley and a win at Sandown later in the season, placing 6th in the championship. Todd for a third year straight placed 18th in the series, Reynolds impressed on his return to V8 Supercars, with numerous top ten qualifying efforts and two top five race results, eventually placing 19th. Murphy placed a respectable 13th in the Pepsi Max Holden.

For the endurance races, the team signed David Russell, Allan Simonsen, Owen Kelly and Tim Blanchard to drive with the team, with Russell joining Todd in Car #7, Simonsen joining Murphy in car #11, Owen Kelly joining Rick in #15 and Blanchard pairing up with Reynolds in #16. For the Gold Coast 600, the team signed Richard Westbrook to drive with Todd, Oliver Gavin to drive with Murphy, Jörg Bergmeister to drive with Rick and Alex Tagliani to join Reynolds. At Phillip Island, all cars finished in the top 15, with car #16 the best in 6th. At Bathurst, a fifth car was entered, the #77 Shannons-Mars Racing Commodore, with Grant Denyer and Cam Waters driving the car. Car #11 claimed Pole position, with #16 qualifying in 4th, the Jack Daniels cars qualified in 16th and 19th, car #77 qualified 29th and Last. Murphy and Simonsen eventually finished 11 seconds behind the winners in 3rd position, with car #16 finishing in 19th, Car #15 placing 22nd and Car #7 placing 24th, some 7 laps down on Murphy and Simonsen, the fifth car of Denyer and Waters did not finish.

=== 2012 ===
2012 started with the announcement that they would switch to Nissan for 2013 making them the first team to change manufacturers for the new regulations.

== Rebirth as Nissan Motorsport ==
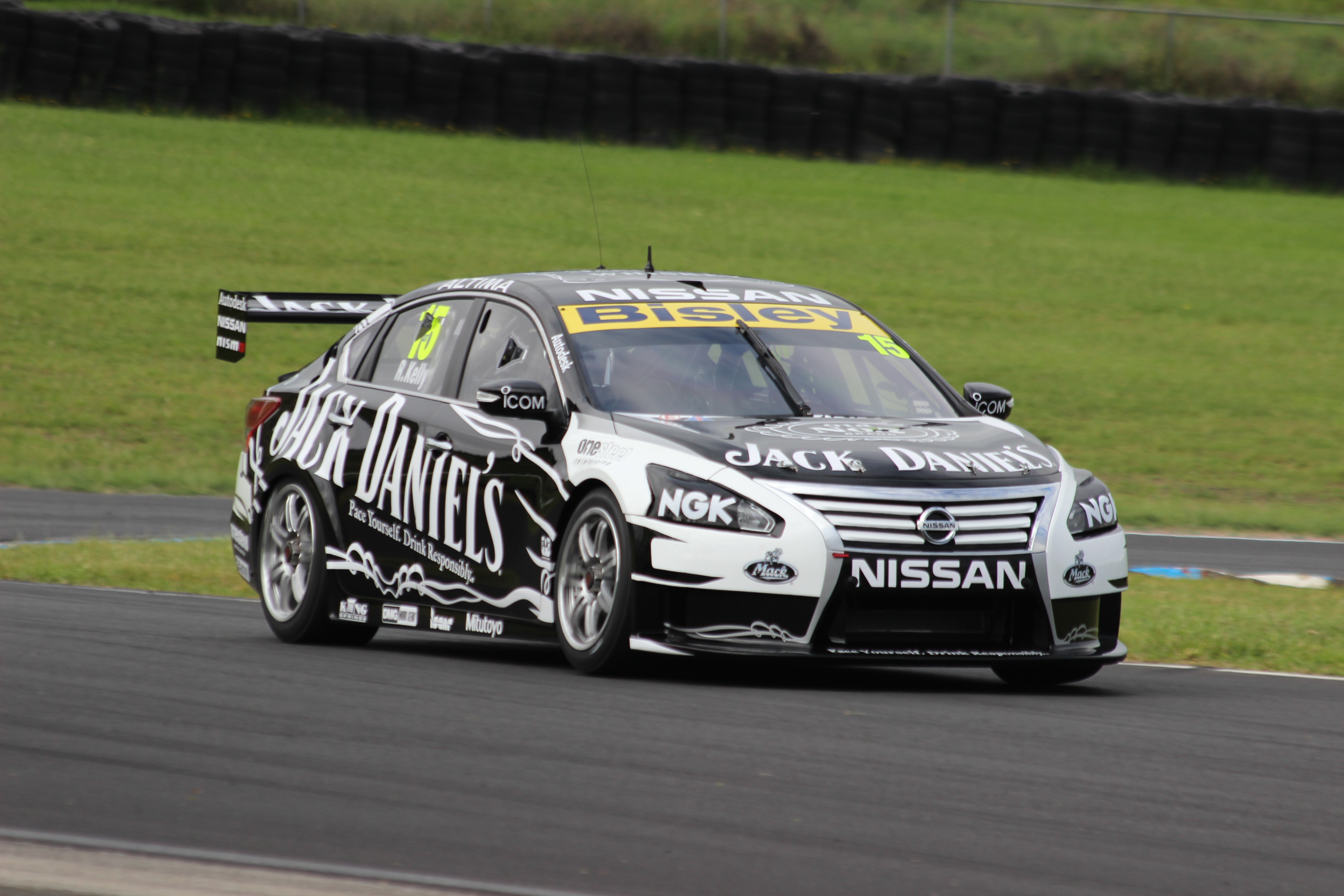
Rick Kelly driving for the team in 2013.

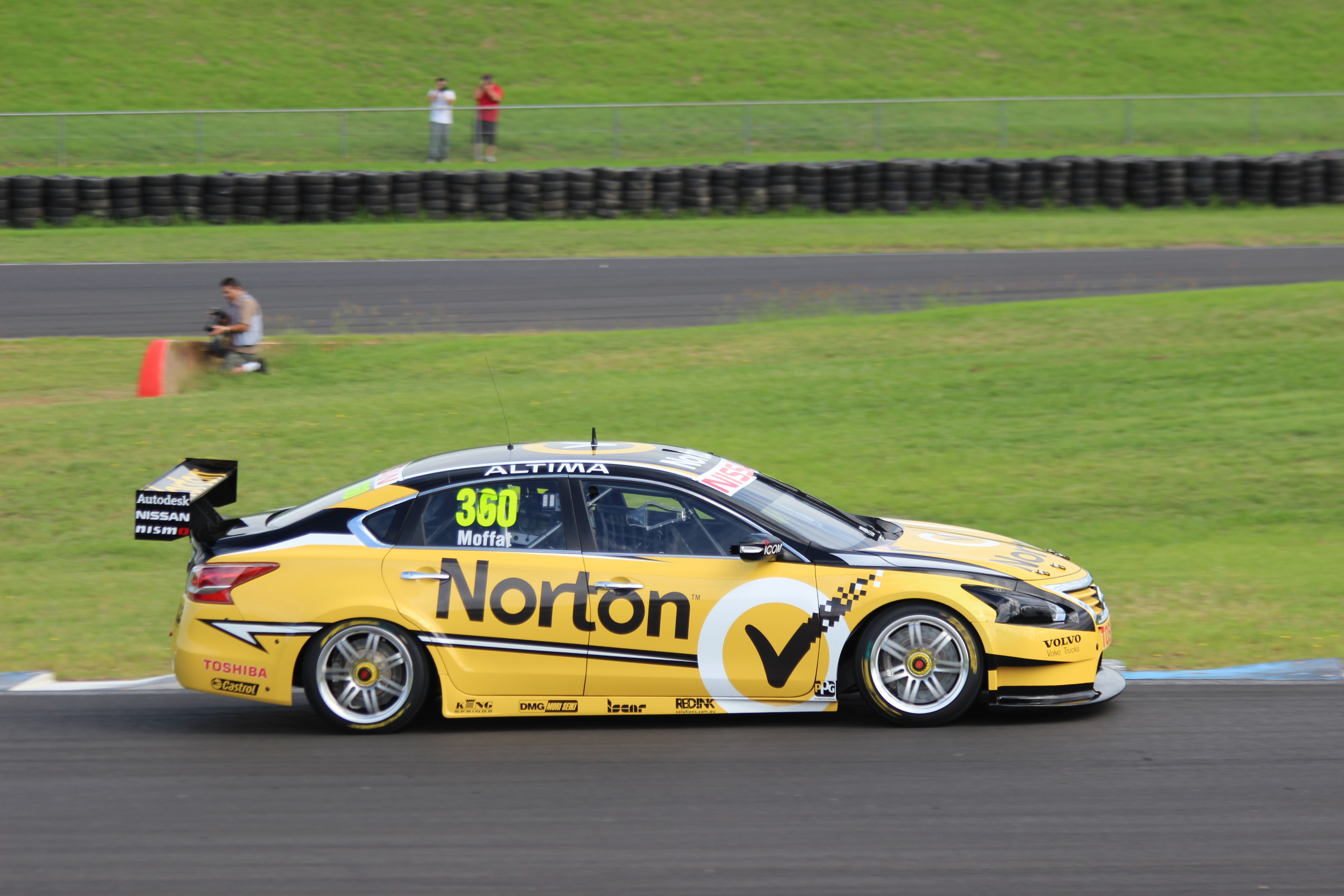
James Moffat driving for the team in 2013.

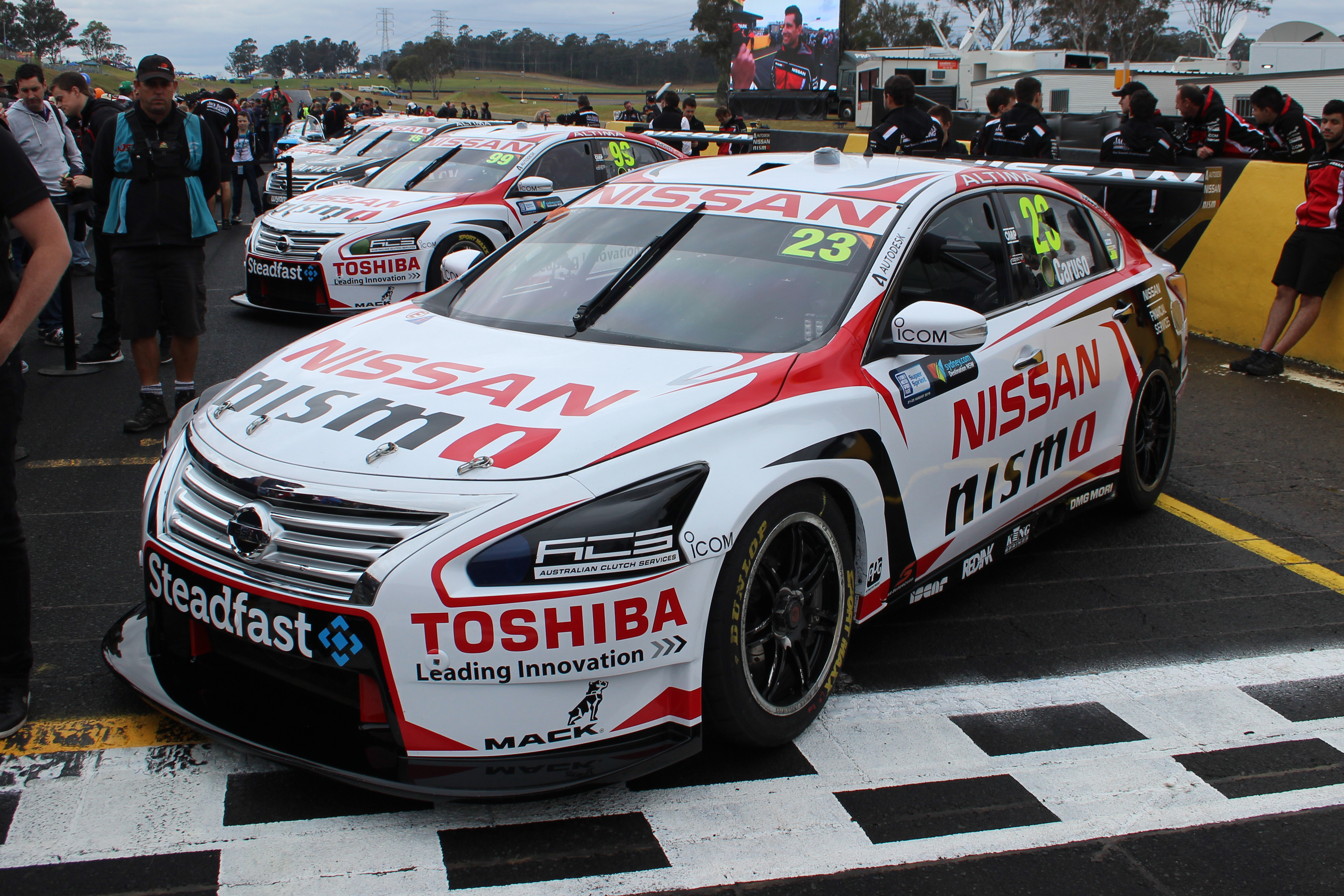
The Nissan Altimas of Michael Caruso and James Moffat at the 2015 Sydney Motorsport Park Super Sprint.

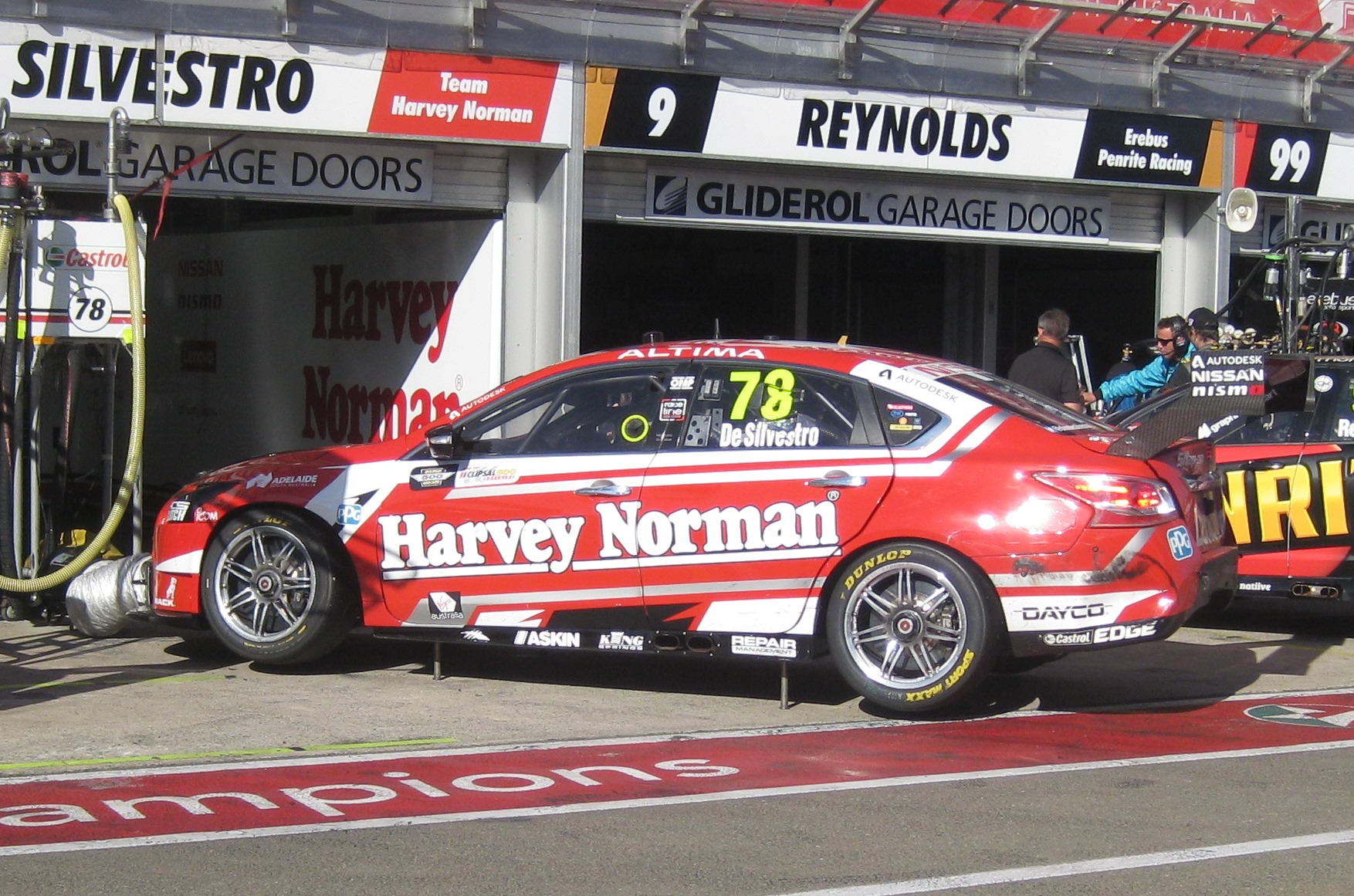
The Nissan Altima of Simona de Silvestro at the 2017 Clipsal 500 Adelaide

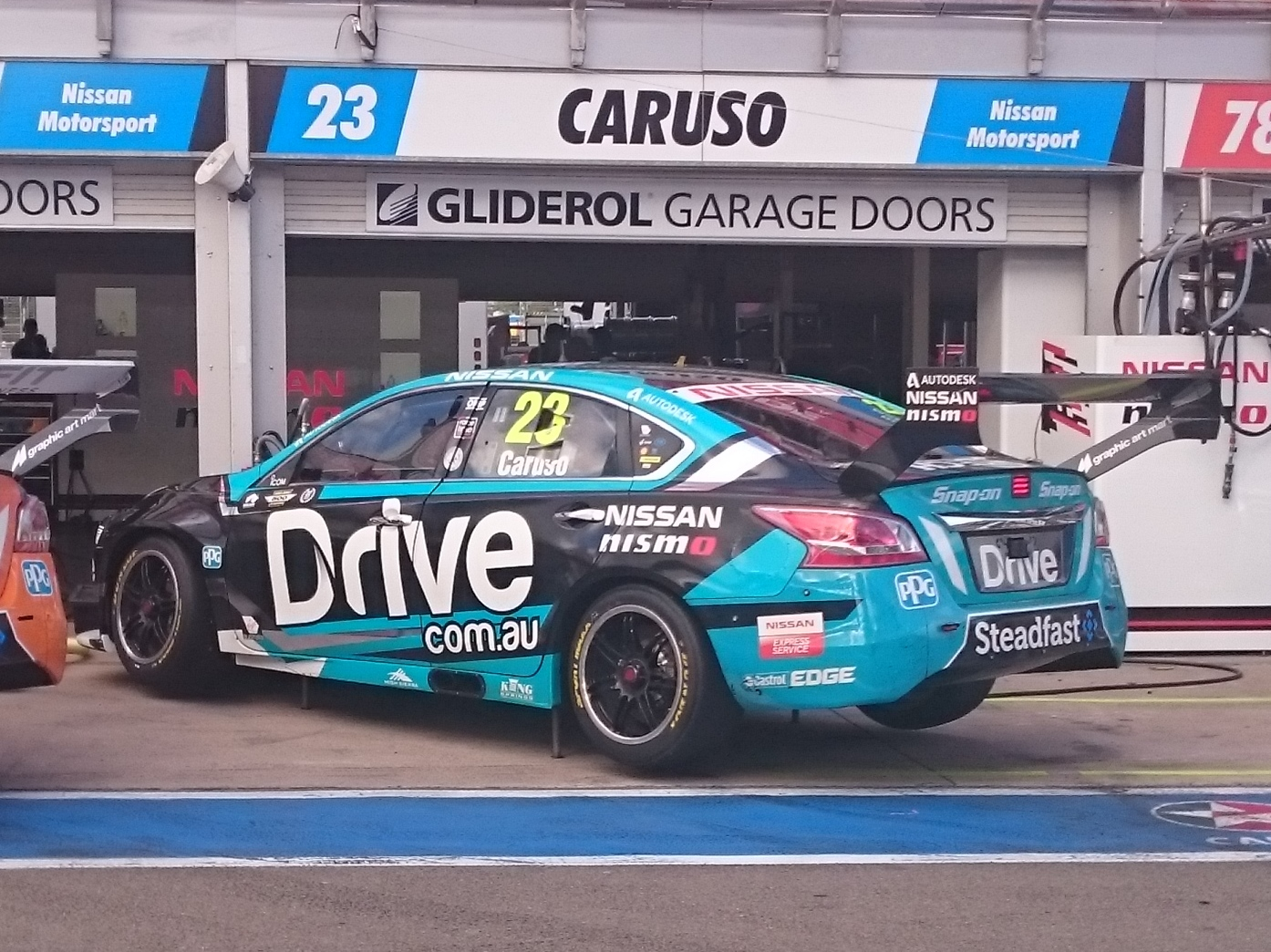
The Nissan Altima of Michael Caruso at the 2018 Adelaide 500

=== 2013 ===
In January 2013 the RECs of Larry Perkins were purchased for the third and fourth entries. For 2013 the team was rebranded as Nissan Motorsport. Michael Caruso and James Moffat were recruited to drive the third and fourth entries.

=== 2014 ===
All four drivers continued with the team in 2014. After the 2014 Season, Norton ended their title sponsorship of the Moffat and Caruso entries.

=== 2015 ===
For 2015, the Norton inspired race numbers, #36 and #360, were replaced, with Caruso changing to Nissan's traditional #23 (a wordplay on the marque itself, "ni" meaning two and "san" meaning three) and Moffat to #99. Jack Daniels also downsized their sponsorship to just the #15 car of Rick Kelly, with Carsales replacing Jack Daniels on the #7 car of Todd Kelly.

=== 2016 ===
Moffat left the team at the end of 2015 with Dale Wood returning to the team. Caruso won a race for the team at Hidden Valley. The Team also ran a fifth entry in the Bathurst 1000, with Renee Gracie and Simona de Silvestro driving the #360 Harvey Norman Supergirls Altima. The entry placed 14th.

=== 2017 ===
In 2017, Dale Wood was replaced by Simona de Silvestro. Todd Kelly, Rick Kelly and Michael Caruso remained with the team.

=== 2018 ===
For 2018, Todd Kelly retired and was replaced by Andre Heimgartner. Rick Kelly, Michael Caruso and Simona de Silvestro continued with the team.

== Rebirth as Kelly Racing ==
=== 2019 ===
Following the termination of Nissan's sponsorship, in 2019 the team resumed operating under the Kelly Racing brand. The team will continue to compete with the Nissan Altima under licence from the company.

=== 2020 ===
In 2020, the team scaled back to two cars and switched to running Ford Mustang GTs. The surplus RECs were sold to Team 18 and Matt Stone Racing.

== Rebirth as Kelly Grove Racing ==
=== 2021 ===
The team was rebranded as Kelly Grove Racing, after the Grove Group bought a 50% shareholding.

Rick Kelly announced his retirement at the end of 2020, he was replaced by David Reynolds who returned to the team. Reynolds brought sponsorship from Penrite, with the car changing to #26 (representing 1926, the year in which Penrite was founded) and his Race Engineer Alistair McVean. Andre Heimgartner continued with the team in car #7.

=== 2022 ===
In 2022, Grove Group will take 100% ownership with the team rebranded Grove Racing. Neither Kelly will continue their involvement with the team.

== Results ==
=== Car No. 3 results ===
Year	Driver	No.	Make	1	2	3	4	5	6	7	8	9	10	11	12	13	14	15	16	17	18	19	20	21	22	23	24	25	26	27	28	29	30	31	32	33	34	35	36	37	38	39	40	Position	Pts
2009	Jack Perkins	11	Holden	ADE; R1; Ret	ADE; R2; Ret	HAM; R3; 19	HAM; R4; 17	WIN; R5; 19	WIN; R6; 19	SYM; R7; 21	SYM; R8; 21	HDV; R9; Ret	HDV; R10; 24	TOW; R11; 18	TOW; R12; 22	SAN; R13; 13	SAN; R14; Ret	QLD; R15; 23	QLD; R16; 26	PHI; R17; 14	BAT; R18; 14	SUR; R19; 14	SUR; R20; 15	SUR; R21; Ret	SUR; R22; 18	PHI; R23; 25	PHI; R24; 23	BAR; R25; 26	BAR; R26; 24	SYD; R27; Ret	SYD; R28; Ret													26th	993
2010	Jason Bargwanna	11	Holden	YMC; R1; 13	YMC; R2; 15	BHR; R3; 15	BHR; R4; 14	ADE; R5; Ret	ADE; R6; 24	HAM; R7; 15	HAM; R8; 9	QLD; R9; 19	QLD; R10; Ret	WIN; R11; 23	WIN; R12; Ret	HDV; R13; 19	HDV; R14; 21	TOW; R15; 22	TOW; R16; 10	PHI; R17; 20	BAT; R18; Ret	SUR; R19; 11	SUR; R20; 20	SYM; R21; Ret	SYM; R22; 17	SAN; R23; 17	SAN; R24; 20	SYD; R25; 9	SYD; R26; 22															24th	1208
2011	Greg Murphy	11	Holden	YMC; R1; 21	YMC; R2; 9	ADE; R3; 18	ADE; R4; 19	HAM; R5; 8	HAM; R6; Ret	BAR; R7; 15	BAR; R8; 24	BAR; R9; 10	WIN; R10; 18	WIN; R11; 11	HID; R12; 12	HID; R13; 22	TOW; R14; 19	TOW; R15; 20	QLD; R16; 6	QLD; R17; 7	QLD; R18; 13	PHI; R19; 11	BAT; R20; 3	SUR; R21; 6	SUR; R22; 4	SYM; R23; Ret	SYM; R24; 14	SAN; R25; Ret	SAN; R26; 21	SYD; R27; 16	SYD; R28; 11													13th	1750
2012	Karl Reindler	11	Holden	ADE; R1; 20	ADE; R2; 20	SYM; R3; 23	SYM; R4; 24	HAM; R5; Ret	HAM; R6; 20	BAR; R7; 23	BAR; R8; 23	BAR; R9; 17	PHI; R10; 16	PHI; R11; 23	HID; R12; 17	HID; R13; Ret	TOW; R14; 25	TOW; R15; 22	QLD; R16; 14	QLD; R17; 21	SMP; R18; 22	SMP; R19; 25	SAN; R20; 20	BAT; R21; 19	SUR; R22; Ret	SUR; R23; DNS	YMC; R24; 21	YMC; R25; 21	YMC; R26; Ret	WIN; R27; 21	WIN; R28; 15	SYD; R29; 7	SYD; R30; 14											24th	1147
2013	Michael Caruso	36	Nissan	ADE; R1; 23	ADE; R2; Ret	SYM; R3; 16	SYM; R4; 19	SYM; R5; 17	PUK; R6; 13	PUK; R7; 12	PUK; R8; 14	PUK; R9; 16	BAR; R10; 11	BAR; R11; 25	BAR; R12; Ret	COA; R13; 20	COA; R14; 15	COA; R15; 15	COA; R16; 24	HID; R17; 10	HID; R18; 21	HID; R19; 11	TOW; R20; 18	TOW; R21; 22	QLD; R22; 25	QLD; R23; 24	QLD; R24; 16	WIN; R25; 2	WIN; R26; Ret	WIN; R27; Ret	SAN; R28; 20	BAT; R29; 25	SUR; R30; Ret	SUR; R31; 10	PHI; R32; 10	PHI; R33; Ret	PHI; R34; Ret	SYD; R35; 7	SYD; R36; 19					23rd	1233
2014	Michael Caruso	36	Nissan	ADE; R1; 18	ADE; R2; 8	ADE; R3; 14	SYM; R4; 21	SYM; R5; 14	SYM; R6; 19	WIN; R7; 19	WIN; R8; 17	WIN; R9; 8	PUK; R10; 17	PUK; R11; 20	PUK; R12; 13	PUK; R13; 5	BAR; R14; 20	BAR; R15; 15	BAR; R16; 10	HID; R17; 12	HID; R18; 10	HID; R19; 13	TOW; R20; 10	TOW; R21; Ret	TOW; R22; 11	QLD; R23; 13	QLD; R24; 24	QLD; R25; 8	SMP; R26; 5	SMP; R27; 20	SMP; R28; 8	SAN; R29; 18	BAT; R30; 15	SUR; R31; 5	SUR; R32; 3	PHI; R33; 5	PHI; R34; 7	PHI; R35; 9	SYD; R36; 22	SYD; R37; 8	SYD; R38; Ret			10th	1939

=== Car No. 7 results ===
Year	Driver	No.	Make	1	2	3	4	5	6	7	8	9	10	11	12	13	14	15	16	17	18	19	20	21	22	23	24	25	26	27	28	29	30	31	32	33	34	35	36	37	38	39	40	Position	Pts
2018	Andre Heimgartner	7	Nissan	ADE; R1; 17	ADE; R2; 25	MEL; R3; 18	MEL; R4; 16	MEL; R5; 21	MEL; R6; 14	SYM; R7; 17	SYM; R8; 19	PHI; R9; 15	PHI; R10; 14	BAR; R11; 25	BAR; R12; 8	WIN; R13; 16	WIN; R14; 11	HID; R15; 16	HID; R16; 16	TOW; R17; 12	TOW; R18; 11	QLD; R19; 15	QLD; R20; 14	SMP; R21; 24	BEN; R22; 19	BEN; R23; Ret	SAN; QR; 6	SAN; R24; 14	BAT; R25; 16	SUR; R26; 19	SUR; R27; C	PUK; R28; 18	PUK; R29; 8	NEW; R30; 8	NEW; R31; 6									17th	1775
2019	Andre Heimgartner	7	Nissan	ADE; R1; 13	ADE; R2; 13	MEL; R3; 15	MEL; R4; 18	MEL; R5; 9	MEL; R6; 14	SYM; R7; 18	SYM; R8; 17	PHI; R9; 3	PHI; R10; 13	BAR; R11; 17	BAR; R12; 23	WIN; R13; 8	WIN; R14; 11	HID; R15; 16	HID; R16; 11	TOW; R17; 12	TOW; R18; 18	QLD; R19; 12	QLD; R20; 7	BEN; R21; 5	BEN; R22; 20	PUK; R23; 8	PUK; R24; 19	BAT; R25; Ret	SUR; R26; Ret	SUR; R27; 21	SAN; QR; 2	SAN; R28; 8	NEW; R29; 21	NEW; R30; 12										16th	1875
2020	Andre Heimgartner	7	Ford	ADE; R1; 11	ADE; R2; 10	MEL; R3; C	MEL; R4; C	MEL; R5; C	MEL; R6; C	SMP1; R7; 15	SMP1; R8; 10	SMP1; R9; 15	SMP2; R10; 17	SMP2; R11; 12	SMP2; R12; 2	HID1; R13; 9	HID1; R14; 10	HID1; R15; 16	HID2; R16; 15	HID2; R17; 10	HID2; R18; 8	TOW1; R19; Ret	TOW1; R20; 14	TOW1; R21; 15	TOW2; R22; 18	TOW2; R23; 24	TOW2; R24; 17	BEN1; R25; 4	BEN1; R26; 2	BEN1; R27; 7	BEN2; R28; 14	BEN2; R29; 10	BEN2; R30; 14	BAT; R31; 11										14th	1444
2021	Andre Heimgartner	7	Ford	BAT; R1; 15	BAT; R2; 9	SAN; R3; 8	SAN; R4; 5	SAN; R5; 11	SYM; R6; 22	SYM; R7; 10	SYM; R8; 22	BEN; R9; 1	BEN; R10; 7	BEN; R11; 10	HID; R12; 15	HID; R13; 17	HID; R14; Ret	TOW1; R15; 12	TOW1; R16; 12	TOW2; R17; 19	TOW2; R18; 20	TOW2; R19; 15	SYD1; R20; 15	SYD1; R21; 8	SYD1; R22; 13	SYD2; R23; Ret	SYD2; R24; 7	SYD2; R25; 10	SYD3; R26; 10	SYD3; R27; 16	SYD3; R29; 24	SYD4; R29; 15	SYD4; R30; C	BAT; R31; NC										17th	1394

=== Car No. 26 results ===
Year	Driver	No.	Make	1	2	3	4	5	6	7	8	9	10	11	12	13	14	15	16	17	18	19	20	21	22	23	24	25	26	27	28	29	30	31	32	33	34	35	36	37	38	39	40	Position	Pts
2009	Rick Kelly	15	Holden	ADE; R1; 10	ADE; R2; 10	HAM; R3; 7	HAM; R4; 14	WIN; R5; 4	WIN; R6; 7	SYM; R7; 11	SYM; R8; 27	HDV; R9; 15	HDV; R10; 4	TOW; R11; 7	TOW; R12; Ret	SAN; R13; 24	SAN; R14; 13	QLD; R15; 14	QLD; R16; 10	PHI; QR; 30	PHI; R17; 5	BAT; R18; 8	SUR; R19; 12	SUR; R20; 9	SUR; R21; 20	SUR; R22; 9	PHI; R23; 3	PHI; R24; 2	BAR; R25; 7	BAR; R26; 16	SYD; R27; 9	SYD; R28; Ret												8th	2162
2010	Rick Kelly	15	Holden	YMC; R1; 10	YMC; R2; 4	BHR; R3; 9	BHR; R4; 4	ADE; R5; 23	ADE; R6; 6	HAM; R7; 8	HAM; R8; 6	QLD; R9; 8	QLD; R10; 7	WIN; R11; 18	WIN; R12; 4	HDV; R13; 14	HDV; R14; 9	TOW; R15; 15	TOW; R16; 13	PHI; QR; 1	PHI; R17; 4	BAT; R18; 16	SUR; R19; 14	SUR; R20; 6	SYM; R21; 14	SYM; R22; 25	SAN; R23; 7	SAN; R24; 8	SYD; R25; 3	SYD; R26; 7														8th	2347
2011	Rick Kelly	15	Holden	YMC; R1; 13	YMC; R2; 19	ADE; R3; 12	ADE; R4; 2	HAM; R5; 1	HAM; R6; 6	BAR; R7; 9	BAR; R8; 16	BAR; R9; 12	WIN; R10; 4	WIN; R11; 17	HID; R12; 1	HID; R13; 20	TOW; R14; 7	TOW; R15; 13	QLD; R16; 4	QLD; R17; 4	QLD; R18; 17	PHI; QR; 6	PHI; R19; 8	BAT; R20; 22	SUR; R21; 7	SUR; R22; 5	SYM; R23; 14	SYM; R24; 12	SAN; R25; 1	SAN; R26; 9	SYD; R27; 10	SYD; R28; 12												6th	2358
2012	Rick Kelly	15	Holden	ADE; R1; 7	ADE; R2; 11	SYM; R3; 19	SYM; R4; 16	HAM; R5; 5	HAM; R6; 12	BAR; R7; 9	BAR; R8; 20	BAR; R9; 19	PHI; R10; 6	PHI; R11; Ret	HID; R12; Ret	HID; R13; 23	TOW; R14; 8	TOW; R15; 20	QLD; R16; 12	QLD; R17; 25	SMP; R18; 17	SMP; R19; 15	SAN; QR; 6	SAN; R20; 12	BAT; R21; 15	SUR; R22; 8	SUR; R23; 11	YMC; R24; 27	YMC; R25; 12	YMC; R26; 9	WIN; R27; 13	WIN; R28; 19	SYD; R29; 6	SYD; R30; 11										14th	1894
2013	Rick Kelly	15	Nissan	ADE; R1; 11	ADE; R2; 14	SYM; R3; 20	SYM; R4; 23	SYM; R5; 16	PUK; R6; 12	PUK; R7; 7	PUK; R8; 10	PUK; R9; 15	BAR; R10; 26	BAR; R11; 16	BAR; R12; 18	COA; R13; 6	COA; R14; 8	COA; R15; 9	COA; R16; 8	HID; R17; 5	HID; R18; 25	HID; R19; 12	TOW; R20; 12	TOW; R21; 20	QLD; R22; 13	QLD; R23; 21	QLD; R24; 9	WIN; R25; 14	WIN; R26; 22	WIN; R27; Ret	SAN; QR; 21	SAN; R28; 16	BAT; R29; 19	SUR; R30; 11	SUR; R31; 6	PHI; R32; 20	PHI; R33; 13	PHI; R34; 8	SYD; R35; 9	SYD; R36; 18				14th	1754
2014	Rick Kelly	15	Nissan	ADE; R1; 6	ADE; R2; 11	ADE; R3; 5	SYM; R4; Ret	SYM; R5; 24	SYM; R6; 20	WIN; R7; 20	WIN; R8; 18	WIN; R9; 14	PUK; R10; 20	PUK; R11; 17	PUK; R12; 15	PUK; R13; 8	BAR; R14; 19	BAR; R15; 22	BAR; R16; 14	HID; R17; 17	HID; R18; 22	HID; R19; 9	TOW; R20; 14	TOW; R21; 19	TOW; R22; 18	QLD; R23; 11	QLD; R24; 5	QLD; R25; 15	SMP; R26; 6	SMP; R27; 9	SMP; R28; 14	SAN; QR; 14	SAN; R29; 13	BAT; R30; 8	SUR; R31; 19	SUR; R32; 9	PHI; R33; 8	PHI; R34; 8	PHI; R35; 11	SYD; R36; 5	SYD; R37; 14	SYD; R38; 7		13th	1921
2015	Rick Kelly	15	Nissan	ADE; R1; 15	ADE; R2; 6	ADE; R3; 7	SYM; R4; 14	SYM; R5; 16	SYM; R6; 14	BAR; R7; 9	BAR; R8; 8	BAR; R9; 20	WIN; R10; 7	WIN; R11; 2	WIN; R12; 11	HID; R13; 3	HID; R14; 21	HID; R15; 13	TOW; R16; 16	TOW; R17; 16	QLD; R18; 16	QLD; R19; 13	QLD; R20; 17	SMP; R21; 6	SMP; R22; 12	SMP; R23; 15	SAN; QR; 14	SAN; R24; 10	BAT; R25; 16	SUR; R26; 9	SUR; R27; 2	PUK; R28; 14	PUK; R29; 11	PUK; R30; 17	PHI; R31; 17	PHI; R32; 8	PHI; R33; 6	SYD; R34; 7	SYD; R35; 8	SYD; R36; 3				9th	2154
2016	Rick Kelly	15	Nissan	ADE; R1; 9	ADE; R2; 13	ADE; R3; 7	SYM; R4; 4	SYM; R5; Ret	PHI; R6; 14	PHI; R7; 11	BAR; R8; 9	BAR; R9; 5	WIN; R10; 4	WIN; R11; 15	HID; R12; 15	HID; R13; 15	TOW; R14; 21	TOW; R15; 12	QLD; R16; 8	QLD; R17; 14	SMP; R18; 9	SMP; R19; 11	SAN; QR; 14	SAN; R20; 10	BAT; R21; Ret	SUR; R22; 21	SUR; R23; 17	PUK; R24; 7	PUK; R25; 12	PUK; R26; 9	PUK; R27; 24	SYD; R28; 6	SYD; R29; Ret											13th	1835
2017	Rick Kelly	15	Nissan	ADE; R1; 5	ADE; R2; 17	SYM; R3; Ret	SYM; R4; DNS	PHI; R5; 16	PHI; R6; 9	BAR; R7; 14	BAR; R8; 15	WIN; R9; 15	WIN; R10; 14	HID; R11; Ret	HID; R12; 10	TOW; R13; 17	TOW; R14; 12	QLD; R15; 8	QLD; R16; 13	SMP; R17; 11	SMP; R18; 20	SAN; QR; 13	SAN; R19; 14	BAT; R20; 13	SUR; R21; 10	SUR; R22; 11	PUK; R23; 11	PUK; R24; 12	NEW; R25; 10	NEW; R26; 4														14th	1773
2018	Rick Kelly	15	Nissan	ADE; R1; 23	ADE; R2; 14	MEL; R3; 17	MEL; R4; 13	MEL; R5; 17	MEL; R6; Ret	SYM; R7; 15	SYM; R8; 11	PHI; R9; 2	PHI; R10; 3	BAR; R11; 14	BAR; R12; 10	WIN; R13; 1	WIN; R14; 4	HID; R15; 6	HID; R16; 5	TOW; R17; 15	TOW; R18; 7	QLD; R19; 13	QLD; R20; 9	SMP; R21; 6	BEN; R22; 2	BEN; R23; 17	SAN; QR; 16	SAN; R24; 8	BAT; R25; 11	SUR; R26; 22	SUR; R27; C	PUK; R28; 16	PUK; R29; 22	NEW; R30; 9	NEW; R31; 17									8th	2515
2019	Rick Kelly	15	Nissan	ADE; R1; 11	ADE; R2; 24	MEL; R3; 22	MEL; R4; 16	MEL; R5; 16	MEL; R6; 19	SYM; R7; 17	SYM; R8; 15	PHI; R9; 7	PHI; R10; 8	BAR; R11; 15	BAR; R12; 20	WIN; R13; 14	WIN; R14; Ret	HID; R15; 21	HID; R16; 16	TOW; R17; 17	TOW; R18; 6	QLD; R19; 16	QLD; R20; 8	BEN; R21; 23	BEN; R22; 11	PUK; R23; 19	PUK; R24; 11	BAT; R25; 8	SUR; R26; 10	SUR; R27; 14	SAN; QR; 17	SAN; R28; 22	NEW; R29; 13	NEW; R30; 19										17th	1820
2020	Rick Kelly	15	Ford	ADE; R1; 9	ADE; R2; 13	MEL; R3; C	MEL; R4; C	MEL; R5; C	MEL; R6; C	SMP1; R7; 14	SMP1; R8; 19	SMP1; R9; 17	SMP2; R10; 18	SMP2; R11; 6	SMP2; R12; 17	HID1; R13; 15	HID1; R14; 13	HID1; R15; 10	HID2; R16; 14	HID2; R17; 11	HID2; R18; 22	TOW1; R19; 17	TOW1; R20; 20	TOW1; R21; 14	TOW2; R22; 11	TOW2; R23; 11	TOW2; R24; 16	BEN1; R25; 6	BEN1; R26; 6	BEN1; R27; 8	BEN2; R28; 23	BEN2; R29; 9	BEN2; R30; 15	BAT; R31; 17										16th	1316
2021	David Reynolds	26	Ford	BAT; R1; 9	BAT; R2; 11	SAN; R3; 11	SAN; R4; 22	SAN; R5; 3	SYM; R6; 16	SYM; R7; 8	SYM; R8; 8	BEN; R9	BEN; R10	BEN; R11	WIN; R12	WIN; R13	WIN; R14	HID; R15	HID; R16	HID; R17	TOW; R18	TOW; R19	SMP; R20	SMP; R21	SMP; R22	BAR; R23	BAR; R24	BAR; R25	BAT; R26	PUK; R27	PUK; R28	PUK; R29	SUR; R30	SUR; R31										8th*	156*

=== Car No. 78 results ===
Year	Driver	No.	Make	1	2	3	4	5	6	7	8	9	10	11	12	13	14	15	16	17	18	19	20	21	22	23	24	25	26	27	28	29	30	31	32	33	34	35	36	37	38	39	40	Position	Pts
2011	David Reynolds	16	Holden	YMC; R1; 17	YMC; R2; 4	ADE; R3; 22	ADE; R4; 14	HAM; R5; 24	HAM; R6; 20	BAR; R7; 19	BAR; R8; 20	BAR; R9; 24	WIN; R10; 22	WIN; R11; 20	HID; R12; Ret	HID; R13; 21	TOW; R14; 24	TOW; R15; 23	QLD; R16; 18	QLD; R17; 18	QLD; R18; 5	PHI; Q 6	PHI; R19; 6	BAT; R20; 19	SUR; R21; 19	SUR; R22; 11	SYM; R23; 22	SYM; R24; 22	SAN; R25; 18	SAN; R26; 13	SYD; R27; 13	SYD; R28; 13												19th	1519
2012	Greg Murphy	51	Holden	ADE; R1; 24	ADE; R2; DNS			HAM; R5; DNF	HAM; R6; 17	BAR; R7; 12	BAR; R8; 16	BAR; R9; 11	PHI; R10; 24	PHI; R11; 14									SAN; Q 26	SAN; R20; 27	BAT; R21; 13	SUR; R22; 13	SUR; R23; 20	YMC; R24; 25	YMC; R25; 27	YMC; R26; Ret	WIN; R27; Ret	WIN; R28; Ret	SYD; R29; Ret	SYD; R30; Ret										28th	649
2012	David Russell	51	Holden			SYM; R3; 21	SYM; R4; Ret								HID; R12; Ret	HID; R13; Ret																												40th	311
2012	Jacques Villeneuve	51	Holden														TOW; R14; Ret	TOW; R15; 24	QLD; R16; 24	QLD; R17; 24	SMP; R18; 24	SMP; R19; 26																						NC	0
2013	James Moffat	360	Nissan	ADE; R1; 14	ADE; R2; 13	SYM; R3; 19	SYM; R4; 20	SYM; R5; 15	PUK; R6; 22	PUK; R7; 9	PUK; R8; 13	PUK; R9; 10	BAR; R10; 10	BAR; R11; 10	BAR; R12; 8	COA; R13; 16	COA; R14; 10	COA; R15; 17	COA; R16; 14	HID; R17; 15	HID; R18; 23	HID; R19; Ret	TOW; R20; 15	TOW; R21; 14	QLD; R22; 10	QLD; R23; 23	QLD; R24; 12	WIN; R25; 1	WIN; R26; 11	WIN; R27; 8	SAN; QR; 20	SAN; R28; 26	BAT; R29; 18	SUR; R30; Ret	SUR; R31; Ret	PHI; R32; Ret	PHI; R33; 21	PHI; R34; 7	SYD; R35; 20	SYD; R36; Ret				18th	1448
2014	James Moffat	360	Nissan	ADE; R1; 20	ADE; R2; 12	ADE; R3; 9	SYM; R4; 18	SYM; R5; 12	SYM; R6; 22	WIN; R7; 18	WIN; R8; 6	WIN; R9; 9	PUK; R10; 10	PUK; R11; 15	PUK; R12; 8	PUK; R13; 16	BAR; R14; 21	BAR; R15; 21	BAR; R16; 8	HID; R17; 11	HID; R18; Ret	HID; R19; 7	TOW; R20; 21	TOW; R21; 18	TOW; R22; 16	QLD; R23; Ret	QLD; R24; 13	QLD; R25; 5	SMP; R26; 12	SMP; R27; 6	SMP; R28; 4	SAN; QR; 22	SAN; R29; Ret	BAT; R30; 2	SUR; R31; 13	SUR; R32; Ret	PHI; R33; 18	PHI; R34; 11	PHI; R35; 18	SYD; R36; 14	SYD; R37; 17	SYD; R38; 15		16th	1734
2015	James Moffat	360	Nissan	ADE; R1; 11	ADE; R2; 7	ADE; R3; Ret	SYM; R4; 12	SYM; R5; 19	SYM; R6; 22	BAR; R7; 13	BAR; R8; 20	BAR; R9; 7	WIN; R10; 17	WIN; R11; 22	WIN; R12; 19	HID; R13; 4	HID; R14; 11	HID; R15; 14	TOW; R16; 11	TOW; R17; 17	QLD; R18; DSQ	QLD; R19; DSQ	QLD; R20; 10	SMP; R21; 12	SMP; R22; 18	SMP; R23; Ret	SAN; QR; 20	SAN; R24; 18	BAT; R25; 10	SUR; R26; 10	SUR; R27; 8	PUK; R28; 11	PUK; R29; 14	PUK; R30; 14	PHI; R31; 5	PHI; R32; 14	PHI; R33; 8	SYD; R34; 24	SYD; R35; Ret	SYD; R36; 16				18th	1643
2016	Dale Wood	96	Nissan	ADE; R1; 20	ADE; R2; 18	ADE; R3; Ret	SYM; R4; 22	SYM; R5; 20	PHI; R6; 20	PHI; R7; 18	BAR; R8; 18	BAR; R9; 20	WIN; R10; 14	WIN; R11; 14	HID; R12; 20	HID; R13; 18	TOW; R14; 23	TOW; R15; 18	QLD; R16; 17	QLD; R17; 19	SMP; R18; 15	SMP; R19; 21	SAN; QR; 20	SAN; R20; 18	BAT; R21; 9	SUR; R22; 7	SUR; R23; 22	PUK; R24; Ret	PUK; R25; 21	PUK; R26; 21	PUK; R27; 18	SYD; R28; Ret	SYD; R29; Ret											22nd	1273
2017	Simona de Silvestro	78	Nissan	ADE; R1; 20	ADE; R2; 23	SYM; R3; 15	SYM; R4; 15	PHI; R5; 13	PHI; R6; 13	BAR; R7; 23	BAR; R8; 25	WIN; R9; 23	WIN; R10; 20	HID; R11; 20	HID; R12; 28	TOW; R13; 18	TOW; R14; 23	QLD; R15; 27	QLD; R16; 19	SMP; R17; 19	SMP; R18; 23	SAN; Q 22	SAN; R19; 18	BAT; R20; Ret	SUR; R21; 16	SUR; R22; 23	PUK; R23; 18	PUK; R24; 17	NEW; R25; 20	NEW; R26; 17														24th	1131
2018	Simona de Silvestro	78	Nissan	ADE; R1; 18	ADE; R2; 18	MEL; R3; Ret	MEL; R4; 23	MEL; R5; 23	MEL; R6; 16	SYM; R7; 23	SYM; R8; 21	PHI; R9; 24	PHI; R10; 22	BAR; R11; 15	BAR; R12; 12	WIN; R13; 22	WIN; R14; 23	HID; R15; 22	HID; R16; 17	TOW; R17; 25	TOW; R18; 22	QLD; R19; 19	QLD; R20; 20	SMP; R21; 14	BEN; R22; 23	BEN; R23; 23	SAN; QR; 22	SAN; R24; Ret	BAT; R25; 14	SUR; R26; 18	SUR; R27; C	PUK; R28; 21	PUK; R29; 18	NEW; R30; 10	NEW; R31; 24									23rd	1323
2019	Simona de Silvestro	78	Nissan	ADE; R1; 15	ADE; R2; 16	MEL; R3; 18	MEL; R4; 19	MEL; R5; 17	MEL; R6; 21	SYM; R7; 21	SYM; R8; 21	PHI; R9; 15	PHI; R10; 18	BAR; R11; 12	BAR; R12; 12	WIN; R13; 23	WIN; R14; 23	HID; R15; 19	HID; R16; 20	TOW; R17; 19	TOW; R18; 10	QLD; R19; 18	QLD; R20; 19	BEN; R21; Ret	BEN; R22; 22	PUK; R23; 16	PUK; R24; 7	BAT; R25; 13	SUR; R26; 21	SUR; R27; 22	SAN; QR; 12	SAN; R28; 15	NEW; R29; 19	NEW; R30; 18										19th	1564

=== Bathurst 1000 results ===
Year	No.	Car	Drivers	Pos.	Laps
2009	7	Holden Commodore (VE)	(Australia) Todd Kelly (Australia) Rick Kelly	8th	161
2009	15	Holden Commodore (VE)	(Australia) Nathan Pretty (United Kingdom) Ben Collins	20th	156
2009	16	Holden Commodore (VE)	(Australia) Tony Ricciardello (Australia) Mark McNally	17th	160
2009	247	Holden Commodore (VE)	(Australia) Jack Perkins (Australia) Dale Wood	14th	160
2010	7	Holden Commodore (VE)	(Australia) Todd Kelly (Australia) Dale Wood	20th	160
2010	11	Holden Commodore (VE)	(Australia) Jason Bargwanna (Australia) Glenn Seton	DNF	132
2010	15	Holden Commodore (VE)	(Australia) Rick Kelly (Australia) Owen Kelly	16th	161
2010	16	Holden Commodore (VE)	(Australia) Tony Ricciardello (Australia) Taz Douglas	22nd	158
2011	7	Holden Commodore (VE)	(Australia) Todd Kelly (Australia) David Russell	24th	154
2011	11	Holden Commodore (VE)	(New Zealand) Greg Murphy (Denmark) Allan Simonsen	3rd	161
2011	15	Holden Commodore (VE)	(Australia) Rick Kelly (Australia) Owen Kelly	22nd	159
2011	16	Holden Commodore (VE)	(Australia) David Reynolds (Australia) Tim Blanchard	19th	161
2011	77	Holden Commodore (VE)	(Australia) Grant Denyer (Australia) Cam Waters	DNF	95
2012	7	Holden Commodore (VE)	(Australia) Todd Kelly (Australia) Tim Blanchard	18th	161
2012	11	Holden Commodore (VE)	(Australia) Karl Reindler (New Zealand) Daniel Gaunt	19th	161
2012	15	Holden Commodore (VE)	(Australia) Rick Kelly (Australia) David Russell	15th	161
2012	23	Holden Commodore (VE)	(Australia) Cam Waters (Australia) Jesse Dixon	20th	158
2012	51	Holden Commodore (VE)	(New Zealand) Greg Murphy (Australia) Owen Kelly	13th	161
2013	7	Nissan Altima (L33)	(Australia) Todd Kelly (Australia) David Russell	DNF	20
2013	15	Nissan Altima (L33)	(Australia) Rick Kelly (Australia) Karl Reindler	19th	161
2013	300	Nissan Altima (L33)	(Australia) Michael Caruso (New Zealand) Daniel Gaunt	25th	147
2013	360	Nissan Altima (L33)	(Australia) James Moffat (Australia) Taz Douglas	18th	161
2014	7	Nissan Altima (L33)	(Australia) Todd Kelly (United Kingdom) Alex Buncombe	7th	161
2014	15	Nissan Altima (L33)	(Australia) Rick Kelly (Australia) David Russell	8th	161
2014	36	Nissan Altima (L33)	(Australia) Michael Caruso (Australia) Dean Fiore	15th	158
2014	360	Nissan Altima (L33)	(Australia) James Moffat (Australia) Taz Douglas	2nd	161
2015	7	Nissan Altima (L33)	(Australia) Todd Kelly (United Kingdom) Alex Buncombe	20th	156
2015	15	Nissan Altima (L33)	(Australia) Rick Kelly (Australia) David Russell	16th	161
2015	23	Nissan Altima (L33)	(Australia) Michael Caruso (Australia) Dean Fiore	13th	161
2015	99	Nissan Altima (L33)	(Australia) James Moffat (Australia) Taz Douglas	10th	161
2016	7	Nissan Altima (L33)	(Australia) Todd Kelly (Australia) Matt Campbell	DNF	157
2016	15	Nissan Altima (L33)	(Australia) Rick Kelly (Australia) Russell Ingall	DNF	156
2016	23	Nissan Altima (L33)	(Australia) Michael Caruso (Australia) Dean Fiore	8th	161
2016	96	Nissan Altima (L33)	(Australia) Dale Wood (Australia) David Russell	9th	161
2016	360	Nissan Altima (L33)	(Switzerland) Simona de Silvestro (Australia) Renee Gracie	14th	159
2017	15	Nissan Altima (L33)	(Australia) Rick Kelly (Australia) David Wall	13th	159
2017	20	Nissan Altima (L33)	(Australia) Todd Kelly (Australia) Jack Le Brocq	7th	161
2017	23	Nissan Altima (L33)	(Australia) Michael Caruso (Australia) Dean Fiore	6th	161
2017	78	Nissan Altima (L33)	(Switzerland) Simona de Silvestro (Australia) David Russell	DNF	152
2018	7	Nissan Altima (L33)	(New Zealand) Andre Heimgartner (Australia) Aaren Russell	16th	161
2018	11	Nissan Altima (L33)	(Australia) Rick Kelly (Australia) Garry Jacobson	11th	161
2018	23	Nissan Altima (L33)	(Australia) Michael Caruso (Australia) Dean Fiore	DNF	69
2018	78	Nissan Altima (L33)	(Switzerland) Simona de Silvestro (Australia) Alex Rullo	14th	161
2019	3	Nissan Altima (L33)	(Australia) Garry Jacobson (Australia) Dean Fiore	19th	159
2019	7	Nissan Altima (L33)	(New Zealand) Andre Heimgartner (Australia) Bryce Fullwood	Ret	157
2019	15	Nissan Altima (L33)	(Australia) Rick Kelly (Australia) Dale Wood	8th	161
2019	78	Nissan Altima (L33)	(Switzerland) Simona de Silvestro (Australia) Alex Rullo	13th	160
2020	7	Ford Mustang GT	(New Zealand) Andre Heimgartner (Australia) Dylan O'Keeffe	11th	161
2020	15	Ford Mustang GT	(Australia) Rick Kelly (Australia) Dale Wood	17th	144
2021	7	Ford Mustang GT	(New Zealand) Andre Heimgartner (Australia) Matt Campbell	NC	159
2021	26	Ford Mustang GT	(Australia) David Reynolds (Australia) Luke Youlden	11th	161

- Wildcard Entries are listed in Italics

== Supercars Championship drivers ==
The following is a list of drivers who have driven for the team in V8 Supercars, in order of their first appearance. Drivers who only drove for the team in an endurance race co-driver basis are listed in italics.

- (Australia) Todd Kelly (2009–17)
- (Australia) Rick Kelly (2009–20)
- (Australia) Jack Perkins (2009)
- (Australia) Dale Wood (2009–10, 2016, 2019–20)
- (Australia) Mark McNally (2009)
- (Australia) Nathan Pretty (2009)
- (Australia) Tony Ricciardello (2009–10)
- (United Kingdom) Ben Collins (2009)
- (Australia) Jason Bargwanna (2010)
- (Australia) Glenn Seton (2010)
- (Australia) Owen Kelly (2010–12)
- (Australia) Taz Douglas (2010, 2013–15)
- (New Zealand) Scott Dixon (2010)
- (Canada) Alex Tagliani (2010–11)
- (New Zealand) Greg Murphy (2011–12)
- (Australia) David Reynolds (2011, 2021)
- (Australia) David Russell (2011–17)
- (Denmark) Allan Simonsen (2011)
- (Australia) Tim Blanchard (2011–12)
- (United Kingdom) Richard Westbrook (2011)
- (United Kingdom) Oliver Gavin (2011)
- (Germany) Jörg Bergmeister (2011)
- (Australia) Karl Reindler (2012–13)
- (Canada) Jacques Villeneuve (2012)
- (New Zealand) Daniel Gaunt (2012–13)
- (United States) Marco Andretti (2012)
- (France) Franck Montagny (2012)
- (United States) Graham Rahal (2012)
- (United Kingdom) Justin Wilson (2012)
- (Australia) Michael Caruso (2013–18)
- (Australia) James Moffat (2013–15)
- (United Kingdom) Alex Buncombe (2014–15)
- (Australia) Dean Fiore (2014–19)
- (Australia) Matt Campbell (2016, 2021)
- (Australia) Russell Ingall (2016)
- (Switzerland) Simona de Silvestro (2016–19)
- (Australia) David Wall (2017)
- (Australia) Jack Le Brocq (2017)
- (New Zealand) Andre Heimgartner (2018–2021)
- (Australia) Aaren Russell (2018)
- (Australia) Garry Jacobson (2018–19)
- (Australia) Alex Rullo (2018–19)
- (Australia) Bryce Fullwood (2019)
- (Australia) Dylan O'Keeffe (2020)
- (Australia) Luke Youlden (2021)

== Super2 drivers ==
The following is a list of drivers who have driven for the team in Super2 Series, in order of their first appearance. Drivers who only drove for the team in an endurance race co-driver basis are listed in italics.

- (Australia) Owen Kelly (2010)
- (Australia) Grant Denyer (2011)
- (Australia) Cam Waters (2011)
- (Australia) Aaron Cameron (2024)
- (Australia) Mason Kelly (2024-2025)
- (Australia) Cameron McLeod (2025)
- (Australia) Max Geoghegan (2025)
