= 2010 Desert 400 =

2010 V8 supercar race

(Bahrain) 2010 Desert 400
Event Information
- Round 2 of 14 in the 2010 V8 Supercar Championship Series
- Date: 25–27 February 2010
- Location: Manama, Bahrain
- Venue: Bahrain International Circuit
- Weather: Fine

Results
Race 1
Distance	37 laps	200 km
Pole position	Jamie Whincup; Triple Eight Race Engineering	2:04.5189
Winner	Jamie Whincup; Triple Eight Race Engineering	1:21:37.4276
Race 2
Distance	37 laps	200 km
Pole position	Jamie Whincup; Triple Eight Race Engineering	2:05.3684
Winner	Jamie Whincup; Triple Eight Race Engineering	1:21:06.4169

The 2010 Desert 400 was the second event of the 2010 V8 Supercar Championship Series. It was held on the weekend of February 25–27 on Bahrain International Circuit, in Manama, Bahrain. This was first time the event was held since 2008, and for the first time the V8 Supercars used the full Grand Prix Circuit, as used for the Bahrain Grand Prix, rather than the previously Paddock Circuit the Australian sedans used from 2006–2008.

Defending series champion Jamie Whincup made a clean sweep of the V8 Supercar Middle-East branch of the championship. Whincup followed his two wins at the 2010 Yas V8 400 with two more wins to hold a perfect 600 points from the first four races of the season. Mark Winterbottom was best of the rest throughout the weekend with a pair of second positions and Craig Lowndes and Shane van Gisbergen shared the third places.

== Results ==
Results as follows:

=== Qualifying Race 3 ===
Qualifying timesheets:

Pos	No	Name	Car	Team	Shootout	Qualifying
Pole	1	Jamie Whincup	Holden VE Commodore	Triple Eight Race Engineering	2:04.5189	2:05.1657
2	9	Shane van Gisbergen	Ford FG Falcon	Stone Brothers Racing	2:04.7601	2:05.6061
3	5	Mark Winterbottom	Ford FG Falcon	Ford Performance Racing	2:04.8245	2:05.8189
4	2	Garth Tander	Holden VE Commodore	Holden Racing Team	2:05.1780	2:05.5089
5	18	James Courtney	Ford FG Falcon	Dick Johnson Racing	2:05.2142	2:05.7921
6	22	Will Davison	Holden VE Commodore	Holden Racing Team	2:05.4901	2:06.0064
7	6	Steven Richards	Ford FG Falcon	Ford Performance Racing	2:05.5247	2:05.9267
8	888	Craig Lowndes	Holden VE Commodore	Triple Eight Race Engineering	2:05.5945	2:05.4957
9	51	Greg Murphy	Holden VE Commodore	Paul Morris Motorsport	2:06.2238	2:05.6877
10	39	Russell Ingall	Holden VE Commodore	Paul Morris Motorsport	2:06.2445	2:05.7791
11	33	Lee Holdsworth	Holden VE Commodore	Garry Rogers Motorsport		2:06.0154
12	4	Alex Davison	Ford FG Falcon	Stone Brothers Racing		2:06.0384
13	15	Rick Kelly	Holden VE Commodore	Kelly Racing		2:06.1876
14	19	Jonathon Webb	Ford FG Falcon	Tekno Autosports		2:06.1908
15	34	Michael Caruso	Holden VE Commodore	Garry Rogers Motorsport		2:06.2695
16	17	Steven Johnson	Ford FG Falcon	Dick Johnson Racing		2:06.3372
17	24	Fabian Coulthard	Holden VE Commodore	Walkinshaw Racing		2:06.3953
18	7	Todd Kelly	Holden VE Commodore	Kelly Racing		2:06.5219
19	47	Tim Slade	Ford FG Falcon	James Rosenberg Racing		2:06.5954
20	55	Paul Dumbrell	Ford FG Falcon	Rod Nash Racing		2:06.8854
21	10	Andrew Thompson	Holden VE Commodore	Walkinshaw Racing		2:06.9030
22	8	Jason Richards	Holden VE Commodore	Brad Jones Racing		2:06.9633
23	11	Jason Bargwanna	Holden VE Commodore	Kelly Racing		2:07.1000
24	14	Jason Bright	Holden VE Commodore	Brad Jones Racing		2:07.3799
25	3	Tony D'Alberto	Holden VE Commodore	Tony D'Alberto Racing		2:07.4578
26	12	Dean Fiore	Ford FG Falcon	Triple F Racing		2:07.5896
27	30	Daniel Gaunt	Holden VE Commodore	Lucas Dumbrell Motorsport		2:07.9573
28	21	Karl Reindler	Holden VE Commodore	Britek Motorsport		2:07.9751
29	16	Tony Ricciardello	Holden VE Commodore	Kelly Racing		2:08.4635

=== Race 3 ===
Race timesheets:

Pos	No	Name	Team	Laps	Time/Retired	Grid	Points
1	1	Jamie Whincup	Triple Eight Race Engineering	37	1:21:37.4276	1	150
2	5	Mark Winterbottom	Ford Performance Racing	37	+3.4s	3	138
3	888	Craig Lowndes	Triple Eight Race Engineering	37	+11.8s	8	129
4	2	Garth Tander	Holden Racing Team	37	+13.4s	4	120
5	9	Shane van Gisbergen	Stone Brothers Racing	37	+26.1s	2	111
6	18	James Courtney	Dick Johnson Racing	37	+27.4s	5	102
7	39	Russell Ingall	Paul Morris Motorsport	37	+38.4s	10	96
8	22	Will Davison	Holden Racing Team	37	+39.7s	6	90
9	15	Rick Kelly	Kelly Racing	37	+43.2s	13	84
10	34	Michael Caruso	Garry Rogers Motorsport	37	+44.1s	15	78
11	17	Steven Johnson	Dick Johnson Racing	37	+45.7s	16	72
12	33	Lee Holdsworth	Garry Rogers Motorsport	37	+46.4s	11	69
13	14	Jason Bright	Brad Jones Racing	37	+59.6s	24	66
14	19	Jonathon Webb	Tekno Autosports	37	+1:08.0s	14	63
15	11	Jason Bargwanna	Kelly Racing	37	+1:09.6s	23	60
16	51	Greg Murphy	Paul Morris Motorsport	37	+1:13.5s	9	57
17	24	Fabian Coulthard	Walkinshaw Racing	37	+1:14.4s	17	54
18	4	Alex Davison	Stone Brothers Racing	37	+1:14.6s	12	51
19	8	Jason Richards	Brad Jones Racing	37	+1:20.3s	22	48
20	7	Todd Kelly	Kelly Racing	37	+1:23.8s	18	45
21	47	Tim Slade	James Rosenberg Racing	37	+1:28.6s	19	42
22	10	Andrew Thompson	Walkinshaw Racing	37	+1:35.9s	21	39
23	3	Tony D'Alberto	Tony D'Alberto Racing	37	+1:48.3s	25	36
24	21	Karl Reindler	Britek Motorsport	36	+ 1 lap	28	33
25	16	Tony Ricciardello	Kelly Racing	36	+ 1 lap	29	30
26	30	Daniel Gaunt	Lucas Dumbrell Motorsport	36	+ 1 lap	27	27
27	55	Paul Dumbrell	Rod Nash Racing	33	+ 4 laps	20	24
Ret	6	Steven Richards	Ford Performance Racing	16	brakes	7	
Ret	12	Dean Fiore	Triple F Racing	5		26	

=== Qualifying Race 4 ===
Qualifying timesheets:

Pos	No	Name	Car	Team	Qualifying
Pole	1	Jamie Whincup	Holden VE Commodore	Triple Eight Race Engineering	2:05.3684
2	5	Mark Winterbottom	Ford FG Falcon	Ford Performance Racing	2:05.5044
3	18	James Courtney	Ford FG Falcon	Dick Johnson Racing	2:05.7606
4	22	Will Davison	Holden VE Commodore	Holden Racing Team	2:05.8111
5	33	Lee Holdsworth	Holden VE Commodore	Garry Rogers Motorsport	2:05.8368
6	14	Jason Bright	Holden VE Commodore	Brad Jones Racing	2:05.9067
7	2	Garth Tander	Holden VE Commodore	Holden Racing Team	2:05.9439
8	8	Jason Richards	Holden VE Commodore	Brad Jones Racing	2:06.0623
9	888	Craig Lowndes	Holden VE Commodore	Triple Eight Race Engineering	2:06.0839
10	6	Steven Richards	Ford FG Falcon	Ford Performance Racing	2:06.0863
11	15	Rick Kelly	Holden VE Commodore	Kelly Racing	2:06.1611
12	7	Todd Kelly	Holden VE Commodore	Kelly Racing	2:06.1702
13	11	Jason Bargwanna	Holden VE Commodore	Kelly Racing	2:06.2087
14	9	Shane van Gisbergen	Ford FG Falcon	Stone Brothers Racing	2:06.2789
15	47	Tim Slade	Ford FG Falcon	James Rosenberg Racing	2:06.3467
16	34	Michael Caruso	Holden VE Commodore	Garry Rogers Motorsport	2:06.4013
17	24	Fabian Coulthard	Holden VE Commodore	Walkinshaw Racing	2:06.4979
18	19	Jonathon Webb	Ford FG Falcon	Tekno Autosports	2:06.5415
19	51	Greg Murphy	Holden VE Commodore	Paul Morris Motorsport	2:06.5661
20	17	Steven Johnson	Ford FG Falcon	Dick Johnson Racing	2:06.6226
21	39	Russell Ingall	Holden VE Commodore	Paul Morris Motorsport	2:06.6262
22	4	Alex Davison	Ford FG Falcon	Stone Brothers Racing	2:06.9360
23	10	Andrew Thompson	Holden VE Commodore	Walkinshaw Racing	2:06.9360
24	55	Paul Dumbrell	Ford FG Falcon	Rod Nash Racing	2:07.0326
25	3	Tony D'Alberto	Holden VE Commodore	Tony D'Alberto Racing	2:07.1872
26	12	Dean Fiore	Ford FG Falcon	Triple F Racing	2:07.7222
27	30	Daniel Gaunt	Holden VE Commodore	Lucas Dumbrell Motorsport	2:08.1029
28	21	Karl Reindler	Holden VE Commodore	Britek Motorsport	2:08.1409
29	16	Tony Ricciardello	Holden VE Commodore	Kelly Racing	2:08.9497

=== Race 4 ===
Race timesheets:

Pos	No	Name	Team	Laps	Time/Retired	Grid	Points
1	1	Jamie Whincup	Triple Eight Race Engineering	37	1:21:06.4169	1	150
2	5	Mark Winterbottom	Ford Performance Racing	37	+4.9s	2	138
3	9	Shane van Gisbergen	Stone Brothers Racing	37	+17.1s	14	129
4	15	Rick Kelly	Kelly Racing	37	+18.5s	11	120
5	33	Lee Holdsworth	Garry Rogers Motorsport	37	+25.0s	5	111
6	22	Will Davison	Holden Racing Team	37	+25.3s	4	102
7	18	James Courtney	Dick Johnson Racing	37	+30.4s	3	96
8	8	Jason Richards	Brad Jones Racing	37	+34.5s	8	90
9	34	Michael Caruso	Garry Rogers Motorsport	37	+34.8s	16	84
10	55	Paul Dumbrell	Rod Nash Racing	37	+35.4s	24	78
11	17	Steven Johnson	Dick Johnson Racing	37	+39.2s	20	72
12	888	Craig Lowndes	Triple Eight Race Engineering	37	+45.4s	9	69
13	39	Russell Ingall	Paul Morris Motorsport	37	+47.1s	21	66
14	11	Jason Bargwanna	Kelly Racing	37	+50.8s	13	63
15	6	Steven Richards	Ford Performance Racing	37	+51.5s	10	60
16	19	Jonathon Webb	Tekno Autosports	37	+1:05.7s	18	57
17	4	Alex Davison	Stone Brothers Racing	37	+1:06.1s	22	54
18	47	Tim Slade	James Rosenberg Racing	37	+1:06.5s	15	51
19	3	Tony D'Alberto	Tony D'Alberto Racing	37	+1:32.9s	25	48
20	12	Dean Fiore	Triple F Racing	37	+1:36.8s	26	45
21	16	Tony Ricciardello	Kelly Racing	37	+2:08.2s	29	42
22	51	Greg Murphy	Paul Morris Motorsport	36	+ 1 lap	19	39
23	30	Daniel Gaunt	Lucas Dumbrell Motorsport	36	+ 1 lap	27	36
24	14	Jason Bright	Brad Jones Racing	32	+ 5 laps	6	33
Ret	2	Garth Tander	Holden Racing Team	36		7	
Ret	24	Fabian Coulthard	Walkinshaw Racing	28		17	
Ret	21	Karl Reindler	Britek Motorsport	27		28	
Ret	10	Andrew Thompson	Walkinshaw Racing	22		23	
Ret	7	Todd Kelly	Kelly Racing	1		12	

== Standings ==
After race 4 of 26

Pos	Name	Team	Points
1	Jamie Whincup	Triple Eight Race Engineering	600
2	Mark Winterbottom	Ford Performance Racing	543
3	Shane van Gisbergen	Stone Brothers Racing	471
4	Craig Lowndes	Triple Eight Race Engineering	447
5	James Courtney	Dick Johnson Racing	420

== See also ==
- 2010 Bahrain International Circuit GP2 Asia Series round (February)
