= Michael Caruso (racing driver) =

Australian racing driver

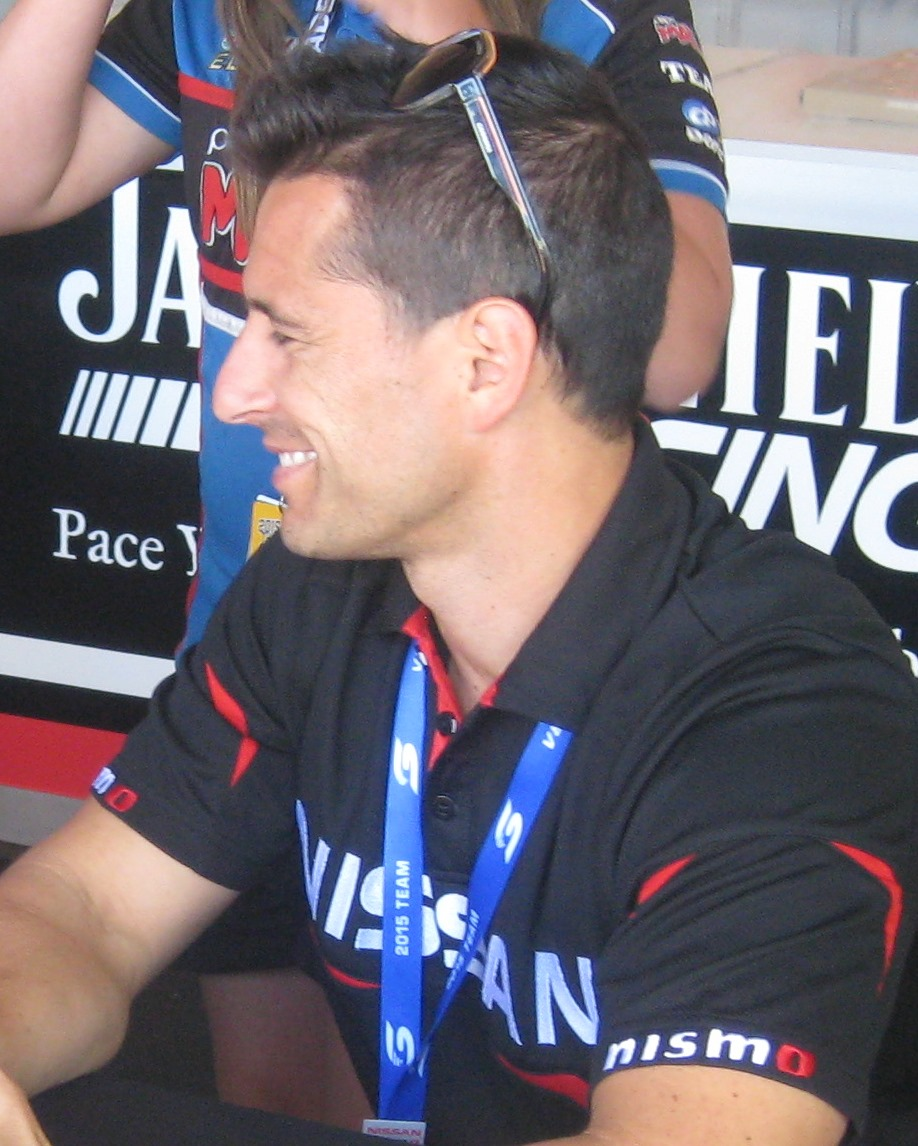
- Caruso in 2015
- Nationality: Australian
- Born: 25 May 1983 (age 43) Sydney, New South Wales
- Categorisation: FIA Gold

Supercars Championship career
- Current team: Team 18 (Endurance race co-driver)
- Championships: 0
- Races: 357
- Wins: 2
- Podiums: 10
- Pole positions: 0
- 2021 position: 40th (114 pts)

Michael Caruso (born 25 May 1983) is an Australian professional motor racing driver. Caruso competes in the Pirtek Enduro Cup, co-driving a Chevrolet Camaro Mk.6 for Team 18 alongside Mark Winterbottom.

== Early career ==
Caruso began his career in go-karts at age 12, before graduating to Formula Ford in 2001. He moved to Formula 3 in 2002 and won the Australian Formula 3 Championship in 2003. Despite offers to move to FIA Formula 3000 in Europe, he chose to join the Holden Young Lions team in the V8 Supercars Development Series for 2004. After a poor start, he quit the team mid-season. In 2005, Caruso competed in the first two rounds of the Australian Formula 3 Championship, before moving to Europe to be a test and reserve driver for the F3000 outfit Team Astromega.

== Touring cars ==
=== Development Series ===
In 2006, Caruso returned to Australia and to the V8 Supercars Development Series with Jim Morton's Decina Racing, finishing 4th in the championship. In 2007, he was runner-up in the Development Series, again with Jim Morton's renamed Ford Rising Star program. He also made three main-game V8 Supercars starts in this period. The first of which was at the 2006 Bathurst 1000 as a replacement for Mark Porter in a Brad Jones Racing entry. Porter had a serious crash on the Friday of the event and later died in hospital. In 2007, Caruso entered the Sandown 500 and Bathurst 1000 with WPS Racing.

=== Garry Rogers Motorsport ===
In 2008, Caruso was signed to compete in his first full season in V8 Supercars, driving a Holden Commodore (VE) for Garry Rogers Motorsport, where he replaced Dean Canto. In 2009, Caruso won his first championship race at the Skycity Triple Crown at Hidden Valley Raceway. He also finished on the podium at the 2009 Bathurst 1000, co-driving with Lee Holdsworth, and in the second race of the Sydney 500. Caruso stayed at the team until 2012, only scoring one further podium in this period.

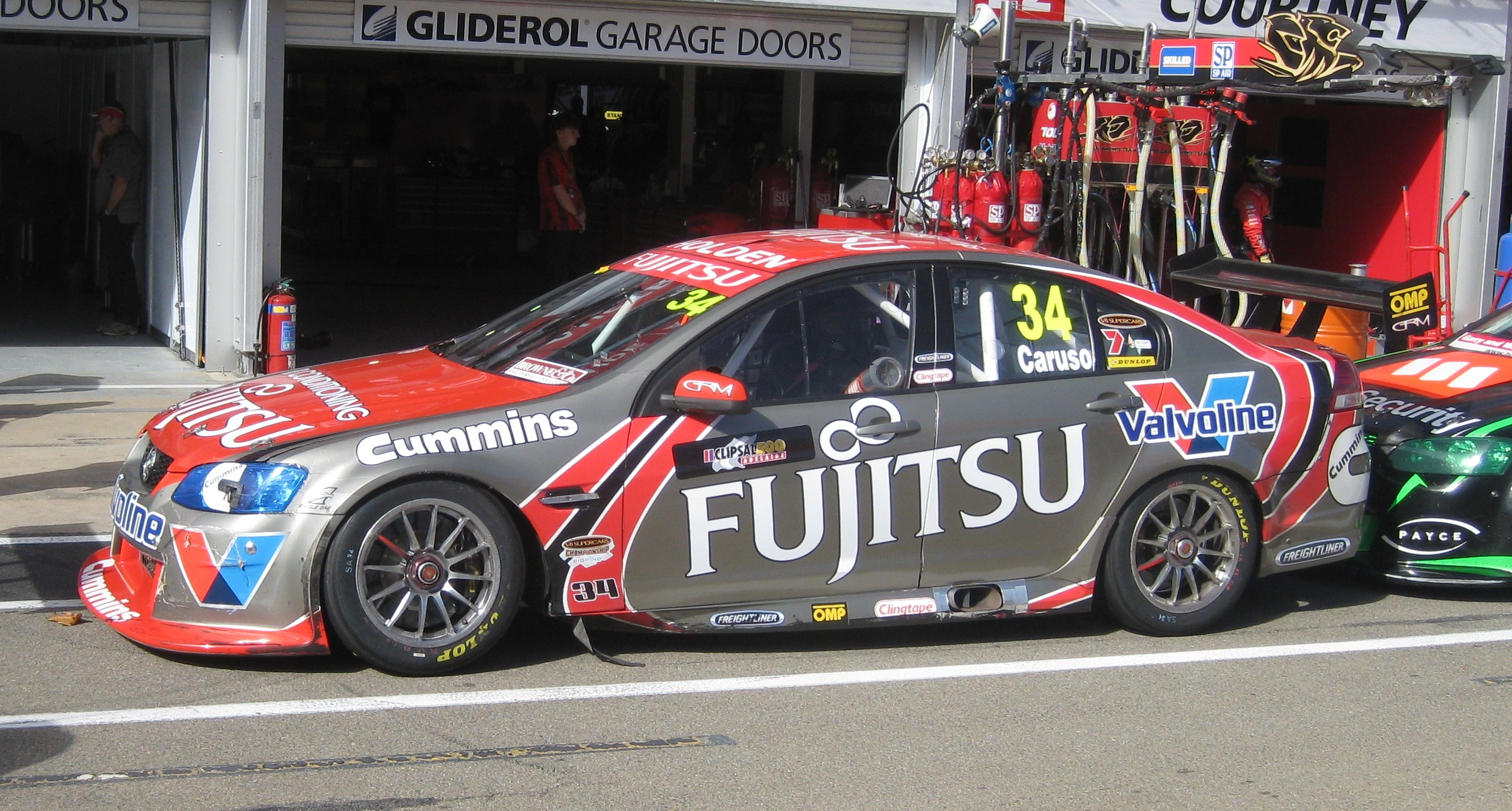
Caruso placed 15th in the 2012 V8 Supercars Championship driving a Holden Commodore (VE)

=== Nissan Motorsport ===
In 2013, Caruso moved to Nissan Motorsport, a four-car team running the Nissan Altima L33. The team was the first to introduce a new manufacturer to the category under the New Generation V8 Supercar (then known as Car of the Future) regulations in 2013. The team largely struggled with the new package and Caruso finished 23rd in the championship. The highlight of the year for Caruso was at the Winton 360, where he finished second in the opening race. Caruso had been leading the race at the conclusion of the first half of the split race; however was beaten by teammate James Moffat to victory in the second half.

In 2014, Caruso finished a career-high tenth in the championship, despite only scoring one podium, in the second race of the Gold Coast 600. Caruso also took pole at the non-championship V8 Supercars Challenge race, a support event to the Australian Grand Prix. Having featured Norton 360 sponsorship in 2013 and 2014, from 2015 onwards, Caruso sported a corporate Nissan and Nismo livery. After another lean year in 2015, Caruso began 2016 strongly at the season-opening Adelaide 500. Caruso finished second in the Sunday race and led the championship following the event. At the 2016 CrownBet Darwin Triple Crown, Caruso won his second career championship race, seven years after his first and coincidentally once again at Hidden Valley Raceway. On 30 January 2019 it was announced that Caruso would lose his drive with Nissan Motorsport. He will not compete full-time in 2019 and has yet to announce an ENDURO drive.

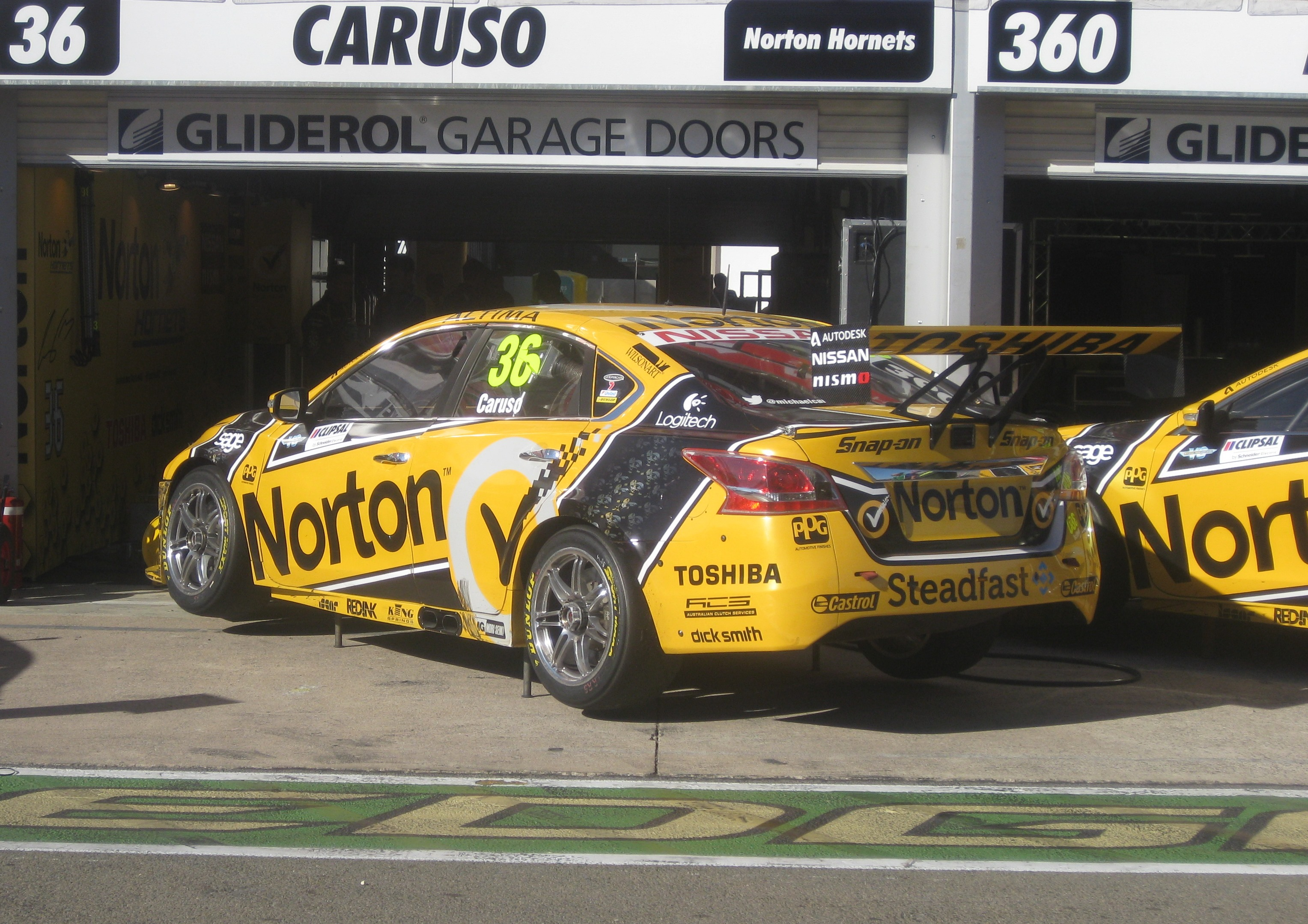
Caruso placed tenth in the 2014 V8 Supercars Championship driving a Nissan L33 Altima

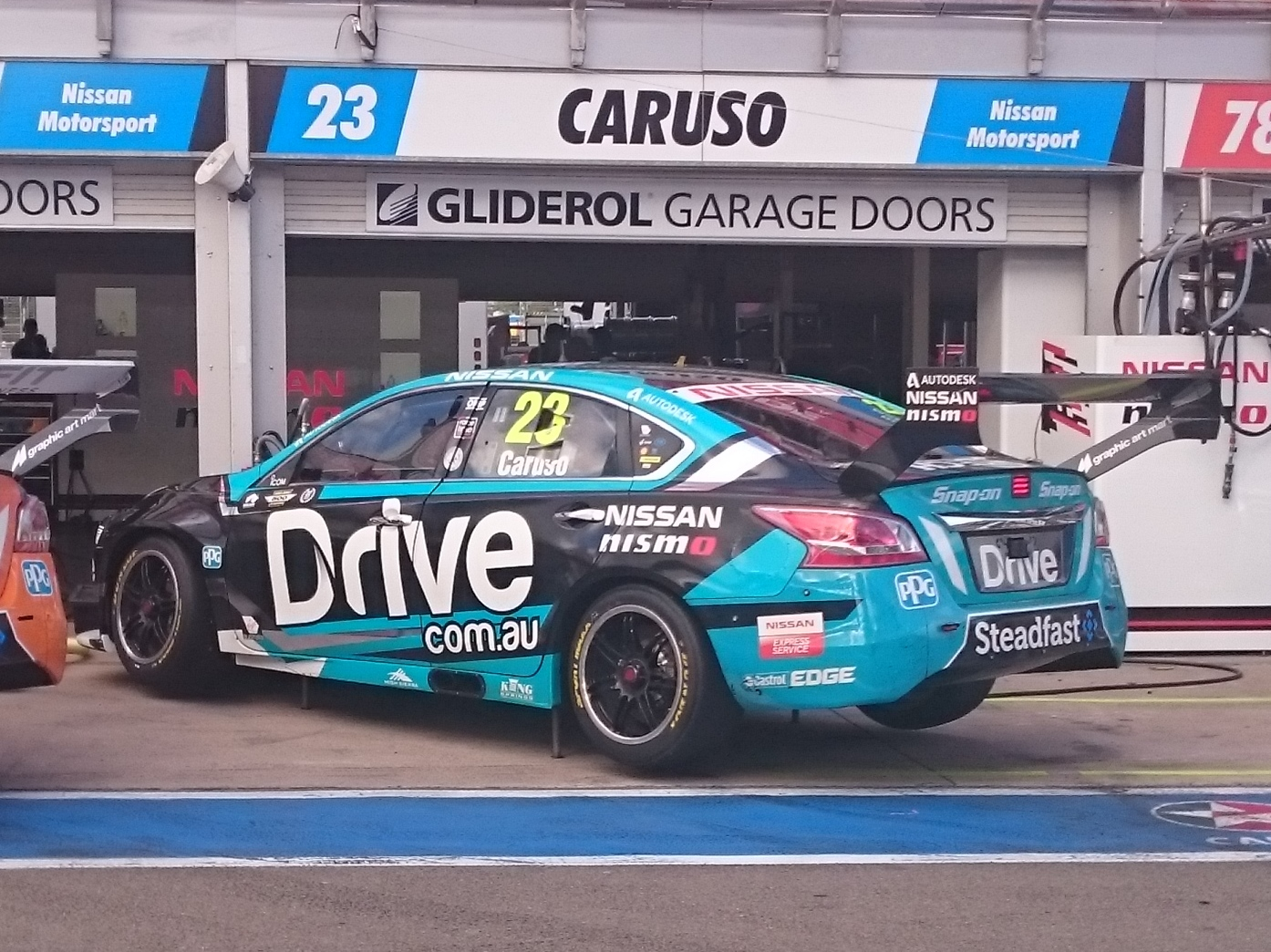
The Nissan Altima of Michael Caruso at the 2018 Adelaide 500

== Career results ==
=== Karting career summary ===
Season	Series	Position
1997	Queensland Junior Kart Championship	1st
1997	Victorian Junior Kart Championship	1st
1997	Australian Junior Intercontinental A Title	1st
1997	North American Junior Intercontinental A Title	1st
1998	Queensland Intercontinental A Title	1st
2000	Victorian Formula A Kart Title	1st

=== Racing career summary ===
Season	Series	Position	Car	Team
2001	Australian Formula Ford Championship	23rd	Spectrum 06 – Ford	Caruso Racing
2002	Australian Formula 3 Championship	5th	Dallara F301 – Alfa Romeo	Caruso Racing
2002	Victorian Road Racing Championship	**1st**	Dallara F301 – Alfa Romeo	Caruso Racing
2003	Australian Formula 3 Championship	**1st**	Dallara F301 – Alfa Romeo	Caruso Racing
2003	Australian Drivers' Championship	11th	Reynard 94D – Holden	Ralt Australia
2004	Konica Minolta V8 Supercar Series	24th	Holden Commodore VX	Holden Young Lions
2005	Australian Drivers' Championship	5th	Dallara F301 – Alfa Romeo	Caruso Racing
2006	Fujitsu V8 Supercar Series	4th	Ford Falcon BA	Decina Racing
2007	Fujitsu V8 Supercar Series	**2nd**	Ford Falcon BA	Ford Rising Stars Racing
2008	V8 Supercar Championship Series	18th	Holden Commodore VE	Garry Rogers Motorsport
2009	V8 Supercar Championship Series	11th	Holden Commodore VE	Garry Rogers Motorsport
2010	V8 Supercar Championship Series	11th	Holden Commodore VE	Garry Rogers Motorsport
2011	International V8 Supercars Championship	14th	Holden Commodore VE	Garry Rogers Motorsport
2012	International V8 Supercars Championship	15th	Holden Commodore VE	Garry Rogers Motorsport
2013	International V8 Supercars Championship	23rd	Nissan Altima L33	Nissan Motorsport
2014	International V8 Supercars Championship	10th	Nissan Altima L33	Nissan Motorsport
2015	International V8 Supercars Championship	12th	Nissan Altima L33	Nissan Motorsport
2016	International V8 Supercars Championship	10th	Nissan Altima L33	Nissan Motorsport
2017	Virgin Australia Supercars Championship	13th	Nissan Altima L33	Nissan Motorsport
2018	Virgin Australia Supercars Championship	18th	Nissan Altima L33	Nissan Motorsport
2019	Virgin Australia Supercars Championship	28th	Holden Commodore ZB; Ford Mustang GT	Garry Rogers Motorsport; Tickford Racing
2020	Virgin Australia Supercars Championship	32nd	Ford Mustang GT	Tickford Racing
2020	TCR Asia Pacific Cup	NC	Alfa Romeo Giulietta Veloce TCR	Garry Rogers Motorsport
2021	Virgin Australia Supercars Championship	40th	Holden Commodore ZB	Team 18
2021	TCR Australia	11th	Alfa Romeo Giulietta Veloce TCR	Garry Rogers Motorsport
2022	Repco Supercars Championship	40th	Holden Commodore ZB	Team 18
2022	TCR Australia	12th	Alfa Romeo Giulietta Veloce TCR	Ashley Seward Motorsport
2023	Repco Supercars Championship	51st	Camaro ZL1-1LE	Team 18

=== Super2 Series results ===
(Races in bold indicate pole position) (Races in italics indicate fastest lap)

Super2 Series results
Year	Team	Car	1	2	3	4	5	6	7	8	9	10	11	12	13	14	15	16	17	18	Position	Points
2004	Holden Young Lions	Holden VX Commodore	WAK; R1; 25	WAK; R2; 2	WAK; R3; 13	ADE; R4; 11	ADE; R5; 9	WIN; R6	WIN; R7	WIN; R8	EAS; R9	EAS; R10	EAS; R11	QLD; R12	QLD; R13	QLD; R14	MAL; R15	MAL; R16	MAL; R17		26th	256
2006	Speed FX Racing	Ford BA Falcon	ADE; R1; 2	ADE; R2; 2	WAK; R3; 19	WAK; R4; 25	WAK; R5; Ret	QLD; R6; 3	QLD; R7; 29	QLD; R8; 7	**ORA**; **R9**; 2	ORA; R10; 18	ORA; R11; 13	MAL; R12; 11	MAL; R13; 23	MAL; R14; 4	BAT; R15; 8	BAT; R16; 10	PHI; R17; 7	PHI; R18; 8	4th	1567
2007	Ford Rising Stars Racing	Ford BA Falcon	ADE; R1; 1	ADE; R2; 1	WAK; R3; 15	WAK; R4; 7	WAK; R5; 6	WIN; R6; Ret	WIN; R7; 6	WIN; R8; 5	**QLD**; **R9**; 1	QLD; R10; 7	QLD; R11; 1	ORA; R12; 24	ORA; R13; 6	ORA; R14; 14	BAT; R15; 2	BAT; R16; 22	PHI; R17; 1	PHI; R18; 1	2nd	298

=== Supercars Championship results ===
(Races in bold indicate pole position) (Races in italics indicate fastest lap)

Supercars results
Year	Team	No.	Car	1	2	3	4	5	6	7	8	9	10	11	12	13	14	15	16	17	18	19	20	21	22	23	24	25	26	27	28	29	30	31	32	33	34	35	36	37	38	39	Position	Points
2006	Brad Jones Racing	12	Ford BA Falcon	ADE; R1	ADE; R2	PUK; R3	PUK; R4	PUK; R5	BAR; R6	BAR; R7	BAR; R8	WIN; R9	WIN; R10	WIN; R11	HDV; R12	HDV; R13	HDV; R14	QLD; R15	QLD; R16	QLD; R17	ORA; R18	ORA; R19	ORA; R20	SAN; R21	BAT; R22; Ret	SUR; R23	SUR; R24	SUR; R25	SYM; R26	SYM; R27	SYM; R28	BHR; R29	BHR; R30	BHR; R31	PHI; R32	PHI; R33	PHI; R34						NC	0
2007	WPS Racing	8	Ford BF Falcon	ADE; R1	ADE; R2	BAR; R3	BAR; R4	BAR; R5	PUK; R6	PUK; R7	PUK; R8	WIN; R9	WIN; R10	WIN; R11	EAS; R12	EAS; R13	EAS; R14	HDV; R15	HDV; R16	HDV; R17	QLD; R18	QLD; R19	QLD; R20	ORA; R21	ORA; R22	ORA; R23	SAN; R24; Ret	BAT; R25; 15	SUR; R26	SUR; R27	SUR; R28	BHR; R29	BHR; R30	BHR; R31	SYM; R32	SYM; R33	SYM; R34	PHI; R35	PHI; R36	PHI; R37			49th	6
2008	Garry Rogers Motorsport	34	Holden VE Commodore	ADE; R1; Ret	ADE; R2; 11	EAS; R3; 25	EAS; R4; 26	EAS; R5; 14	HAM; R6; 12	HAM; R7; 18	HAM; R8; 17	BAR; R9; Ret	BAR; R10; 17	BAR; R11; 16	SAN; R12; 20	SAN; R13; 23	SAN; R14; 19	HDV; R15; 16	HDV; R16; 12	HDV; R17; 15	QLD; R18; 15	QLD; R19; 16	QLD; R20; 16	WIN; R21; 8	WIN; R22; Ret	WIN; R23; 20	PHI; QR; 21	PHI; R24; 5	BAT; R25; Ret	SUR; R26; 20	SUR; R27; 18	SUR; R28; 19	BHR; R29; 15	BHR; R30; 14	BHR; R31; 17	SYM; R32; 17	SYM; R33; 16	SYM; R34; 18	ORA; R35; 8	ORA; R36; 11	ORA; R37; 10		18th	1439
2009	Garry Rogers Motorsport	34	Holden VE Commodore	ADE; R1; Ret	ADE; R2; 16	HAM; R3; 25	HAM; R4; 6	WIN; R5; 10	WIN; R6; 27	SYM; R7; 12	SYM; R8; 16	HDV; R9; 11	HDV; R10; 1	TOW; R11; 5	TOW; R12; 10	SAN; R13; 5	SAN; R14; 20	QLD; R15; 19	QLD; R16; 6	PHI; QR; 11	PHI; R17; Ret	BAT; R18; 3	SUR; R19; Ret	SUR; R20; 12	SUR; R21; Ret	SUR; R22; 14	PHI; R23; 20	PHI; R24; 10	BAR; R25; 14	BAR; R26; 18	SYD; R27; 6	SYD; R28; 2											11th	1977
2010	Garry Rogers Motorsport	34	Holden VE Commodore	YMC; R1; 15	YMC; R2; 11	BHR; R3; 10	BHR; R4; 9	ADE; R5; 8	ADE; R6; 10	HAM; R7; 5	HAM; R8; 3	QLD; R9; 25	QLD; R10; 6	WIN; R11; 8	WIN; R12; 8	HDV; R13; 17	HDV; R14; 15	TOW; R15; 19	TOW; R16; 11	PHI; QR; Ret	PHI; R17; 11	BAT; R18; 10	SUR; R19; 4	SUR; R20; 11	SYM; R21; 9	SYM; R22; 20	SAN; R23; 16	SAN; R24; Ret	SYD; R25; 6	SYD; R26; 8													11th	2004
2011	Garry Rogers Motorsport	34	Holden VE Commodore	YMC; R1; 15	YMC; R2; 5	ADE; R3; 16	ADE; R4; 21	HAM; R5; 15	HAM; R6; Ret	BAR; R7; Ret	BAR; R8; 12	BAR; R9; 18	WIN; R10; 17	WIN; R11; 16	HID; R12; 6	HID; R13; 11	TOW; R14; 12	TOW; R15; 16	QLD; R16; 16	QLD; R17; 19	QLD; R18; 19	PHI; QR; 8	PHI; R19; 16	BAT; R20; 10	SUR; R21; 8	SUR; R22; 21	SYM; R23; 9	SYM; R24; 15	SAN; R25; 21	SAN; R26; 22	SYD; R27; 4	SYD; R28; 6											14th	1729
2012	Garry Rogers Motorsport	34	Holden VE Commodore	ADE; R1; 22	ADE; R2; 22	SYM; R3; 15	SYM; R4; 7	HAM; R5; 8	HAM; R6; 25	BAR; R7; 8	BAR; R8; 12	BAR; R9; 9	PHI; R10; 23	PHI; R11; 20	HID; R12; Ret	HID; R13; 4	TOW; R14; 14	TOW; R15; 25	QLD; R16; 8	QLD; R17; 9	SMP; R18; 8	SMP; R19; 11	SAN; QR; 5	SAN; R20; 14	BAT; R21; 5	SUR; R22; Ret	SUR; R23; Ret	YMC; R24; 16	YMC; R25; 15	YMC; R26; 15	WIN; R27; Ret	WIN; R28; 16	SYD; R29; 10	SYD; R30; Ret									15th	1770
2013	Nissan Motorsport	36	Nissan Altima L33	ADE; R1; 12	ADE; R2; Ret	SYM; R3; 16	SYM; R4; 19	SYM; R5; 17	PUK; R6; 13	PUK; R7; 12	PUK; R8; 14	PUK; R9; 16	BAR; R10; 11	BAR; R11; 25	BAR; R12; Ret	COA; R13; 20	COA; R14; 15	COA; R15; 15	COA; R16; 24	HID; R17; 10	HID; R18; 21	HID; R19; 11	TOW; R20; 18	TOW; R21; 22	QLD; R22; 25	QLD; R23; 24	QLD; R24; 18	WIN; R25; 2	WIN; R26; Ret	WIN; R27; Ret	SAN; QR; 24	SAN; R28; 20	BAT; R29; 25	SUR; R30; Ret	SUR; R31; 10	PHI; R32; 10	PHI; R33; Ret	PHI; R34; Ret	SYD; R35; 17	SYD; R36; 19			23rd	1233
2014	Nissan Motorsport	36	Nissan Altima L33	ADE; R1; 18	ADE; R2; 8	ADE; R3; 14	SYM; R4; 21	SYM; R5; 14	SYM; R6; 19	WIN; R7; 19	WIN; R8; 17	WIN; R9; 8	PUK; R10; 17	PUK; R11; 20	PUK; R12; 13	PUK; R13; 5	BAR; R14; 20	BAR; R15; 15	BAR; R16; 10	HID; R17; 12	HID; R18; 10	HID; R19; 13	TOW; R20; 10	TOW; R21; Ret	TOW; R22; 11	QLD; R23; 13	QLD; R24; 24	QLD; R25; 8	SMP; R26; 5	SMP; R27; 20	SMP; R28; 8	SAN; QR; 13	SAN; R29; 18	BAT; R30; 15	SUR; R31; 5	SUR; R32; 3	PHI; R33; 5	PHI; R34; 7	PHI; R35; 9	SYD; R36; 22	SYD; R37; 8	SYD; R38; Ret	10th	1939
2015	Nissan Motorsport	23	Nissan Altima L33	ADE; R1; 21	ADE; R2; Ret	ADE; R3; 14	SYM; R4; 15	SYM; R5; 23	SYM; R6; 19	BAR; R7; 18	BAR; R8; 15	BAR; R9; 10	WIN; R10; 3	WIN; R11; 10	WIN; R12; 4	HID; R13; 5	HID; R14; 14	HID; R15; 21	TOW; R16; 15	TOW; R17; 11	QLD; R18; 17	QLD; R19; 11	QLD; R20; 12	SMP; R21; 16	SMP; R22; 15	SMP; R23; 7	SAN; QR; 21	SAN; R24; 11	BAT; R25; 13	SUR; R26; 20	SUR; R27; 10	PUK; R28; 6	PUK; R29; 15	PUK; R30; 5	PHI; R31; 19	PHI; R32; 7	PHI; R33; 22	SYD; R34; 12	SYD; R35; 15	SYD; R36; 8			12th	1898
2016	Nissan Motorsport	23	Nissan Altima L33	ADE; R1; 13	ADE; R2; 6	ADE; R3; 2	SYM; R4; 21	SYM; R5; 11	PHI; R6; 13	PHI; R7; 6	BAR; R8; 26	BAR; R9; 9	WIN; R10; 8	WIN; R11; 10	HID; R12; 1	HID; R13; 6	TOW; R14; 9	TOW; R15; 8	QLD; R16; 22	QLD; R17; 4	SMP; R18; 13	SMP; R19; 10	SAN; QR; 9	SAN; R20; 14	BAT; R21; 8	SUR; R22; 17	SUR; R23; 9	PUK; R24; 8	PUK; R25; 9	PUK; R26; 13	PUK; R27; 12	SYD; R28; 13	SYD; R29; 14										10th	2239
2017	Nissan Motorsport	23	Nissan Altima L33	ADE; R1; 11	ADE; R2; 22	SYM; R3; 13	SYM; R4; 16	PHI; R5; 5	PHI; R6; 10	BAR; R7; 18	BAR; R8; 19	WIN; R9; 13	WIN; R10; Ret	HID; R11; 16	HID; R12; 19	TOW; R13; 15	TOW; R14; 13	QLD; R15; 15	QLD; R16; Ret	SMP; R17; 6	SMP; R18; 7	SAN; QR; 11	SAN; R19; 20	BAT; R20; 6	SUR; R21; 5	SUR; R22; 15	PUK; R23; 17	PUK; R24; 11	NEW; R25; 14	NEW; R26; 5													13th	1776
2018	Nissan Motorsport	23	Nissan Altima L33	ADE; R1; 14	ADE; R2; 9	MEL; R3; 13	MEL; R4; 8	MEL; R5; 16	MEL; R6; 8	SYM; R7; 16	SYM; R8; 24	PHI; R9; 18	PHI; R10; 5	BAR; R11; 20	BAR; R12; 26	WIN; R13; 6	WIN; R14; 5	HID; R15; 10	HID; R16; 9	TOW; R17; DNS	TOW; R18; Ret	QLD; R19; 9	QLD; R20; 13	SMP; R21; 22	BEN; R22; 3	BEN; R23; 9	SAN; QR; 18	SAN; R24; 25	BAT; R25; Ret	SUR; R26; 23	SUR; R27; C	PUK; R28; 10	PUK; R29; 17	NEW; R30; 15	NEW; R31; 19								18th	1765
2019	Garry Rogers Motorsport	33	Holden ZB Commodore	ADE; R1	ADE; R2	MEL; R3	MEL; R4	MEL; R5	MEL; R6	SYM; R7	SYM; R8	PHI; R9	PHI; R10	BAR; R11	BAR; R12	WIN; R13	WIN; R14	HID; R15	HID; R16	TOW; R17; 22	TOW; R18; 9	QLD; R19; 17	QLD; R20; 20	BEN; R21	BEN; R22	PUK; R23	PUK; R24																28th	643
2019	Tickford Racing	6	Ford Mustang S550																									BAT; R25; 20	SUR; R26; 4	SUR; R27; 5	SAN; QR; 8	SAN; R28; 21	NEW; R29	NEW; R30									28th	643
2020	Tickford Racing	5	Ford Mustang S550	ADE; R1	ADE; R2	MEL; R3	MEL; R4	MEL; R5	MEL; R6	SMP1; R7	SMP1; R8	SMP1; R9	SMP2; R10	SMP2; R11	SMP2; R12	HID1; R13	HID1; R14	HID1; R15	HID2; R16	HID2; R17	HID2; R18	TOW1; R19	TOW1; R20	TOW1; R21	TOW2; R22	TOW2; R23	TOW2; R24	BEN1; R25	BEN1; R26	BEN1; R27	BEN2; R28	BEN2; R29	BEN2; R30	BAT; R31; 7									32nd	192
2021	Team 18	18	Holden ZB Commodore	BAT1; R1	BAT1; R2	SAN; R3	SAN; R4	SAN; R5	SYM; R6	SYM; R7	SYM; R8	BEN; R9	BEN; R10	BEN; R11	HID; R12	HID; R13	HID; R14	TOW1; R15	TOW1; R16	TOW2; R17	TOW2; R18	TOW2; R19	SMP1; R20	SMP1; R21	SMP1; R22	SMP2; R23	SMP2; R24	SMP2; R25	SMP3; R26	SMP3; R27	SMP3; R28	SMP4; R29; PO	SMP4; R30; PO	BAT2; R31; 16									40th	114
2022	Team 18	18	Holden ZB Commodore	SMP; R1	SMP; R2	SYM; R3	SYM; R4	SYM; R5	MEL; R6	MEL; R7	MEL; R8	MEL; R9	BAR; R10	BAR; R11	BAR; R12	WIN; R13	WIN; R14	WIN; R15	HID; R16	HID; R17	HID; R18	TOW; R19	TOW; R20	BEN; R21	BEN; R22	BEN; R23	SAN; R24; PO	SAN; R25; PO	SAN; R26; PO	PUK; R27	PUK; R28	PUK; R29	BAT; R30; 15	SUR; R31	SUR; R32	ADE; R33	ADE; R34						45th	120
2023	Team 18	18	Chevrolet Camaro ML1	NEW; R1	NEW; R2	MEL; R3	MEL; R4	MEL; R5	MEL; R6	BAR; R7	BAR; R8	BAR; R9	SYM; R10	SYM; R11	SYM; R12	HID; R13	HID; R14	HID; R15	TOW; R16	TOW; R17	SMP; R18	SMP; R19	BEN; R20	BEN; R21	BEN; R22	SAN; R23; 11	BAT; R24; Ret	SUR; R25	SUR; R26	ADE; R27	ADE; R28												51st	144
2024	Team 18	18	Chevrolet Camaro ML1	BAT1; R1	BAT1; R2	MEL; R3	MEL; R4	MEL; R5	MEL; R6	TAU; R7	TAU; R8	BAR; R9	BAR; R10	HID; R11	HID; R12	TOW; R13	TOW; R14	SMP; R15	SMP; R16	BEN; R17	BEN; R18	SAN; R19; 16	BAT; R20; 18	SUR; R21	SUR; R22	ADE; R23	ADE; R24																45th	216

=== Bathurst 1000 results ===
Year	Team	Car	Co-driver	Position	Laps
2006	Brad Jones Racing	Ford Falcon BA	(Australia) Dale Brede (New Zealand) Mark Porter†	DNF	59
2007	WPS Racing	Ford Falcon BF	(Australia) Grant Denyer	15th	159
2008	Garry Rogers Motorsport	Holden Commodore VE	(Australia) Lee Holdsworth	DNF	139
2009	Garry Rogers Motorsport	Holden Commodore VE	(Australia) Lee Holdsworth	**3rd**	161
2010	Garry Rogers Motorsport	Holden Commodore VE	(Australia) Greg Ritter	10th	161
2011	Garry Rogers Motorsport	Holden Commodore VE	(Australia) Marcus Marshall	10th	161
2012	Garry Rogers Motorsport	Holden Commodore VE	(Australia) Greg Ritter	5th	161
2013	Nissan Motorsport	Nissan Altima L33	(New Zealand) Daniel Gaunt	25th	147
2014	Nissan Motorsport	Nissan Altima L33	(Australia) Dean Fiore	15th	158
2015	Nissan Motorsport	Nissan Altima L33	(Australia) Dean Fiore	13th	161
2016	Nissan Motorsport	Nissan Altima L33	(Australia) Dean Fiore	8th	161
2017	Nissan Motorsport	Nissan Altima L33	(Australia) Dean Fiore	6th	161
2018	Nissan Motorsport	Nissan Altima L33	(Australia) Dean Fiore	DNF	69
2019	Tickford Racing	Ford Mustang S550	(Australia) Cam Waters	20th	148
2020	Tickford Racing	Ford Mustang S550	(Australia) Lee Holdsworth	7th	161
2021	Team 18	Holden Commodore ZB	(Australia) Mark Winterbottom	16th	161
2022	Team 18	Holden Commodore ZB	(Australia) Mark Winterbottom	15th	161
2023	Team 18	Chevrolet Camaro Mk.6	(Australia) Mark Winterbottom	DNF	160
2024	Team 18	Chevrolet Camaro Mk.6	(Australia) Mark Winterbottom	18th	161

† Porter was the entered driver but was killed in a support race. Caruso would replace him.

=== TCR Australia results ===
TCR Australia results
Year	Team	Car	1	2	3	4	5	6	7	8	9	10	11	12	13	14	15	16	17	18	19	20	21	Position	Points
2021	GRM Team Valvoline	Alfa Romeo Giulietta Veloce TCR	SYM; R1; 12	SYM; R2; Ret	SYM; R3; 9	PHI; R4; 17	PHI; R5; 15	PHI; R6; 17	BAT; R7; 15	BAT; R8; DSQ	BAT; R9; 18	SMP; R10; 6	SMP; R11; 3	SMP; R12; 1	BAT; R13; 3	BAT; R14; Ret	BAT; R15; 3							11th	326
2022	Ashley Seward Motorsport	Alfa Romeo Giulietta Veloce TCR	SYM; R1; 12	SYM; R2; 9	SYM; R3; 8	PHI; R4; 17	PHI; R5; 8	PHI; R6; 7	BAT; R7; 10	BAT; R8; 4	BAT; R9; 11	SMP; R10; 20	SMP; R11; 14	SMP; R12; 20	QLD; R13; 10	QLD; R14; Ret	QLD; R15; DNS	SAN; R16; 6	SAN; R17; 10	SAN; R18; 1	BAT; R19; 10	BAT; R20; C	BAT; R21; 9	12th	520

Sporting positions
Preceded by James Manderson	Australian Formula 3 Champion; 2003	Succeeded by Karl Reindler
Awards and achievements
Preceded by Ryan Briscoe	Jon Targett Perpetual Karting Trophy; 1997	Succeeded by Neil McFadyen
