= Lee Holdsworth =

Australian racing driver (born 1983)

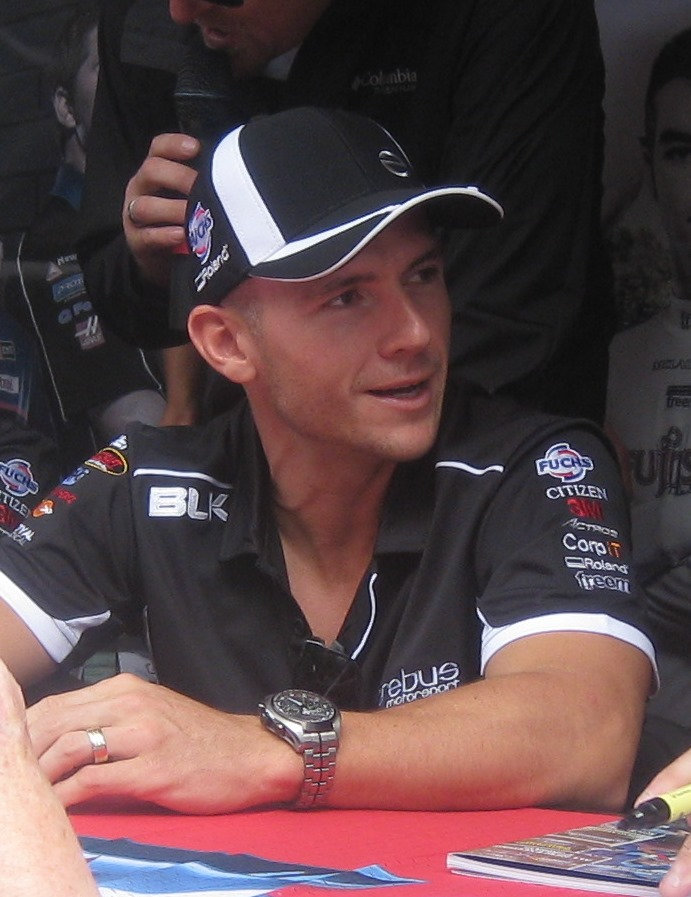
- Holdsworth in 2014
- Nationality: Australian
- Born: Lee Robert Holdsworth; 2 February 1983 (age 43) Melbourne, Victoria
- Categorisation: FIA Gold

Supercars Championship career
- Current team: Team 18 (Endurance race co-driver)
- Championships: 0
- Races: 513
- Wins: 4
- Podiums: 19
- Pole positions: 4
- 2020 position: 11th (1553 pts)

Lee Robert Holdsworth (born 2 February 1983) is an Australian semi-retired racing driver. He won the 2021 Bathurst 1000 alongside Chaz Mostert and finished his full-time career after the 2022 season, after nearly two decades of racing.

== History ==
=== Early career ===
Lee Holdsworth's motorsport career began in go-karts. He started racing cars in 2001 at just 17, when he contested the Commodore Cup national series.

Holdsworth finished fifth in the 2002 Commodore Cup national series and third in the 2003 Commodore Cup championship, before graduating to the Konica Minolta V8 Supercar Series in 2004, driving a Holden VX Commodore for Smiths Trucks Racing.

Holdsworth recorded some impressive results in 2004, including finishing his first-ever round in the top-10 and winning the reverse-grid race at Eastern Creek, as well as finishing third overall in Queensland. Holdsworth also contested the Sandown 500 and Bathurst 1000 V8 Supercar endurance races with Phillip Scifleet and Mark Noske respectively.

In 2005, Holdsworth ran a limited campaign in the renamed HPDC V8 Supercar Development Series and the Australian Formula Ford Championship, as well as contesting the two endurance races with Garry Rogers Motorsport.

=== Supercars Championship ===
Holdsworth's big break came in 2006 when he scored a full-time drive with Garry Rogers Motorsport in the V8 Supercar Championship. In 2007, Holdsworth won his first V8 Supercar round at Oran Park. The win came courtesy of consistent driving over the weekend and a good strategy in the final race in changeable conditions.

In 2008 Holdsworth began working with The John Bowe Institute of Driving, helping to teach the techniques of performance driving to the public..

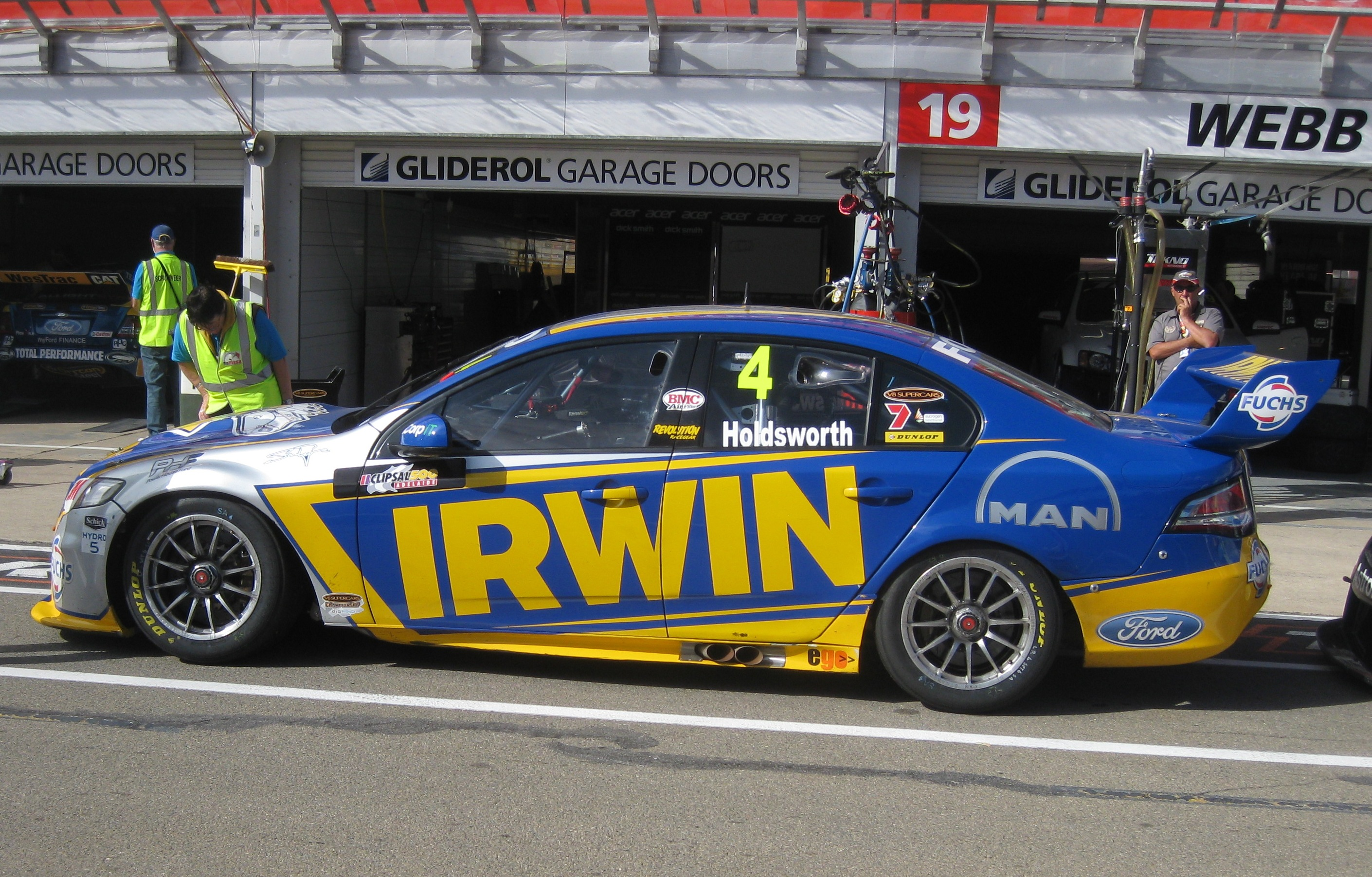
Holdsworth's Ford FG Falcon at the 2012 Clipsal 500 Adelaide

Holdsworth moved to Stone Brothers Racing for the 2012 V8 Supercars Championship, ending a six-year association with Garry Rogers Motorsport. For 2013, the team was bought by Erebus Motorsport, and ran Mercedes-Benz E63 AMGs. Holdsworth scored the team's first race win at Winton in April 2014.

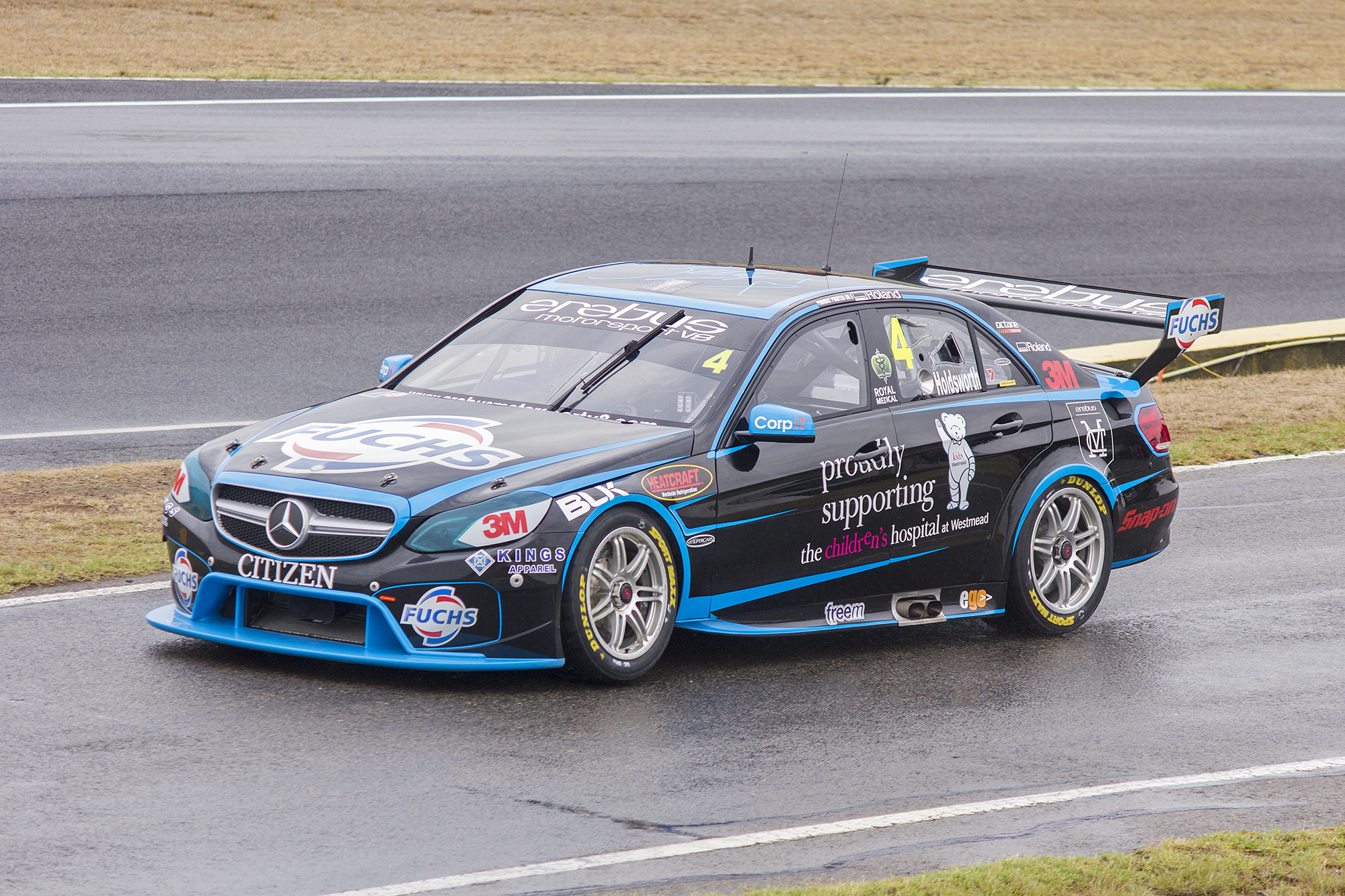
Holdsworth at the 2014 V8 Supercars test day. Holdsworth placed 20th in the 2014 V8 Supercars Championship, driving for Erebus Motorsport

In 2015, Holdsworth moved to Team 18, who operated as a satellite team to the Holden Racing Team. Holdsworth won the 2015 Drivers' Driver award at the 2015 V8 Gala awards.

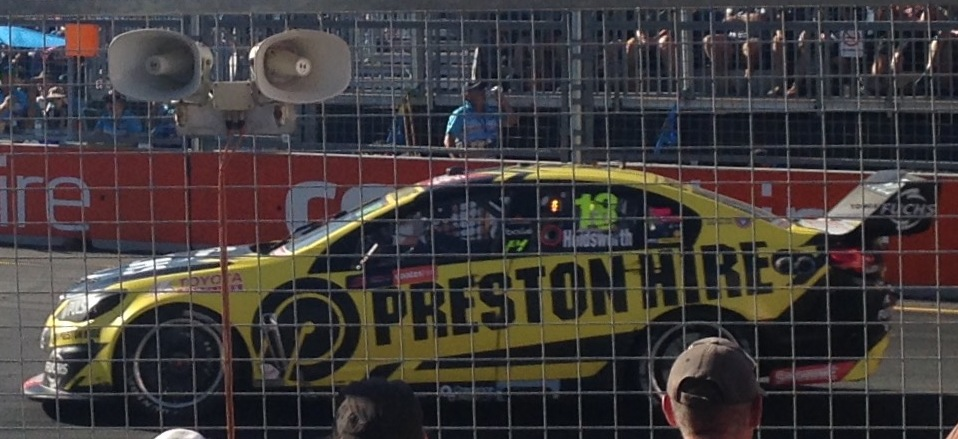
Holdsworth at the 2017 Newcastle 500

In 2016, the team was rebranded to Team 18. They also became an independent team, racing a Triple Eight-built Commodore. During Race 13 of the season at the Darwin Triple Crown, Holdsworth sustained fractures to his pelvis, right knee and two ribs after an incident on the opening lap. For the next two events, Kurt Kostecki substituted for Holdsworth in a spare chassis before the team were able to obtain a brand-new car from Triple Eight. At the Sydney SuperSprint, Holdsworth was still unfit to race, so Enduro Cup driver Karl Reindler drove the car for the event before returning as a co-driver at the Sandown 500 with Holdsworth competing in his first race since his accident. In 2017, Holdsworth continued with Team 18 and finished the season in 16th place with a best finish of 4th place being recorded at the Newcastle 500.

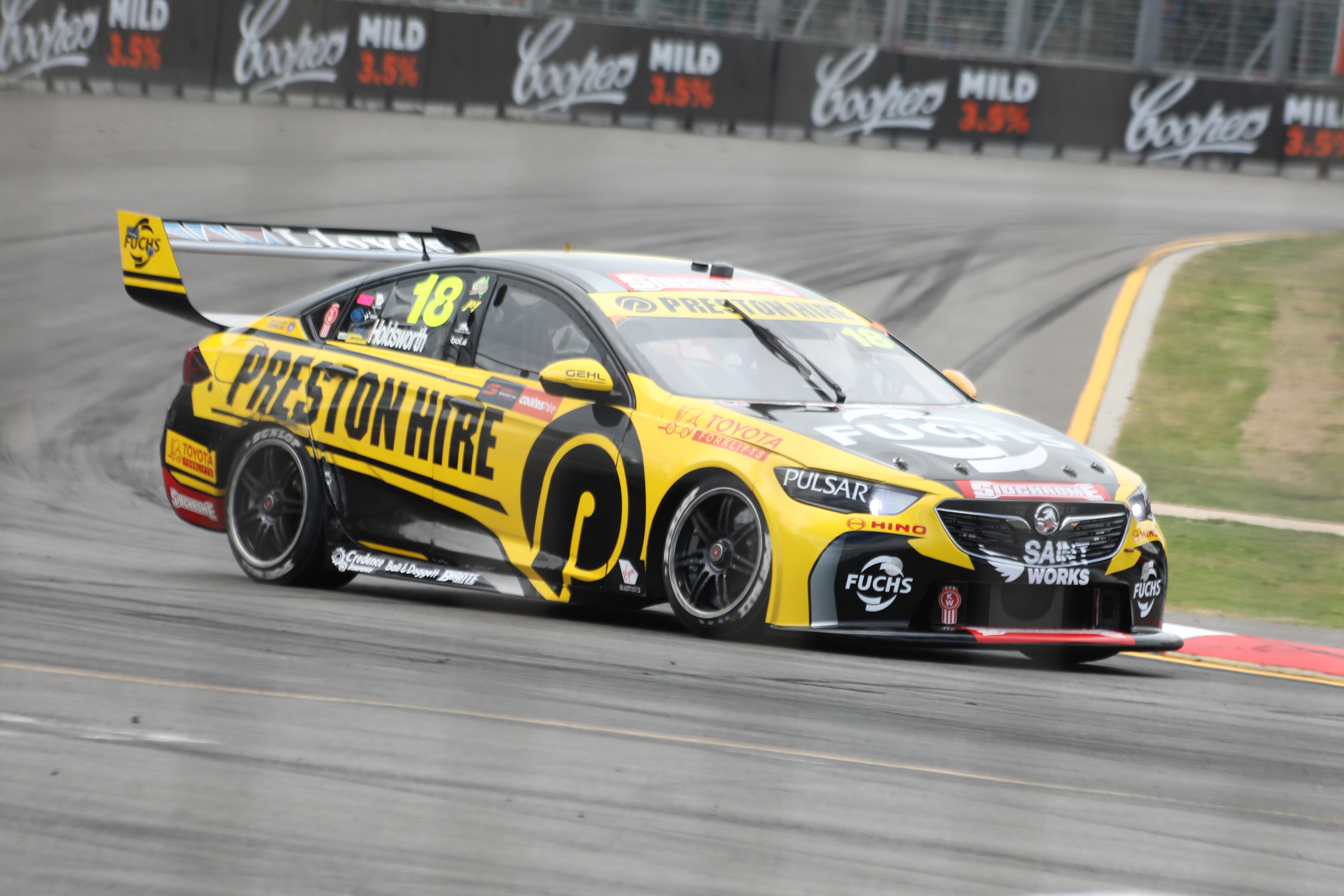
Holdsworth at the 2018 Newcastle 500

For 2018, Holdsworth will continue with the team and race the new Holden ZB Commodore.

In 2019, Holdsworth rejuvenated his career by signing a multiple year deal to drive for Tickford Racing in the #5 Ford Mustang. In two years with the team, he finished tenth in 2019 and 11th in 2020 points standings before mutually departing Tickford in favour of Jack Le Brocq.

On December 5, 2021, Holdsworth won his first Bathurst 1000, driving alongside Chaz Mostert in the #25 Holden Commodore for Walkinshaw Andretti United.

In his final year of racing, Holdsworth was awarded the Barry Sheene Medal, the first time he had received the award in his career.

=== Retirement ===
On 30 August 2022, Holdsworth announced that he would retire from full-time competition at the end of the 2022 season. He stated that he desired to spend more time with his family, while also pursuing a career as a real estate agent. He later returned as a co-driver for Chaz Mostert in 2023 and 2024 before joining Team 18 in 2025.

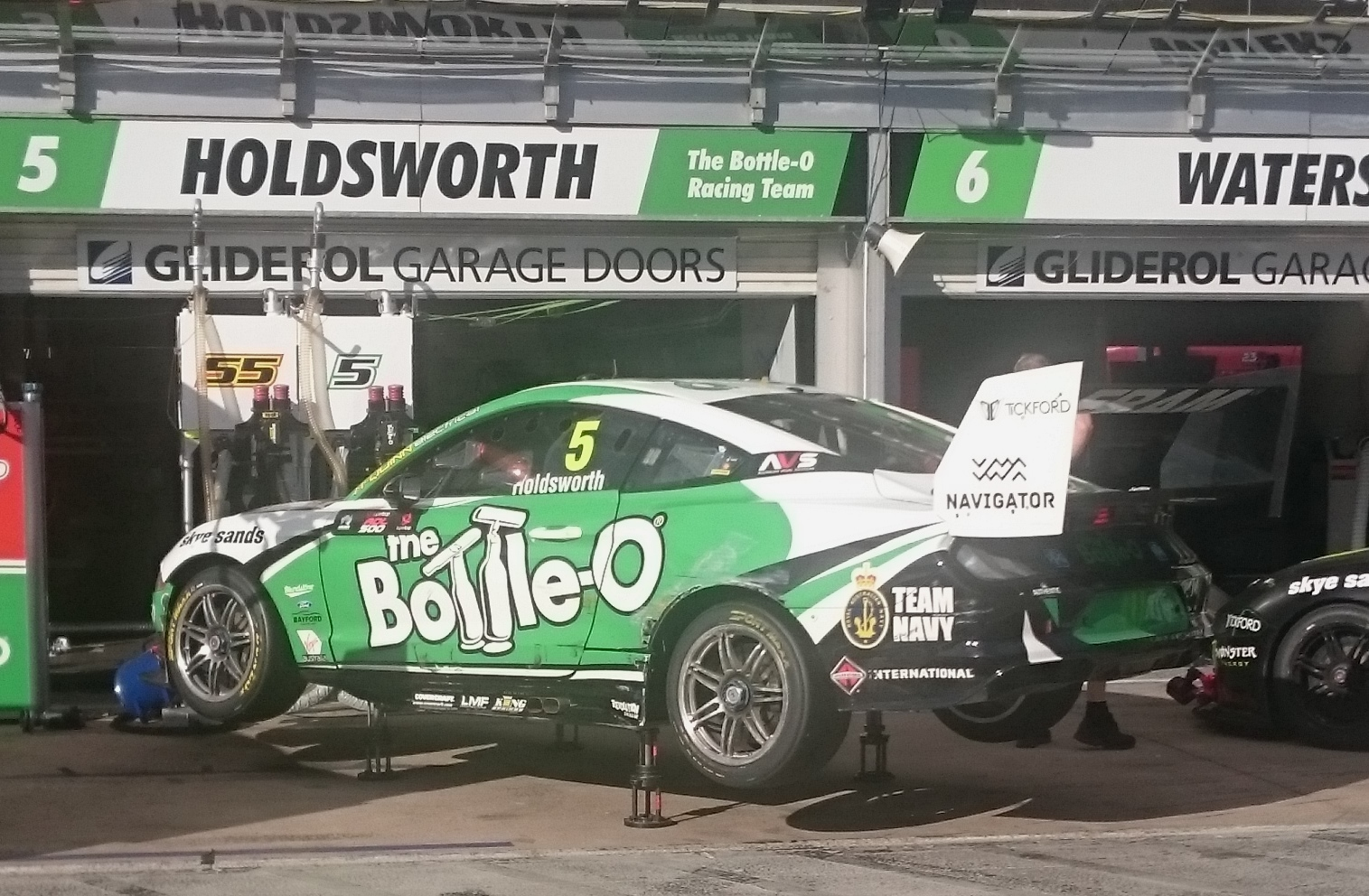
Holdsworth drove a Ford Mustang GT for Tickford Racing in the 2019 Supercars Championship

== Career results ==
=== Career summary ===
Season	Series	Position	Car	Team
2002	Commodore Cup National Series	5th	Holden VH Commodore	TTM Traffic & Parking
2003	Commodore Cup National Series	3rd	Holden VH Commodore	TTM Traffic & Parking
2004	Konica Minolta V8 Supercar Series	13th	Holden VX Commodore	Robert Smith Racing
2004	V8 Supercar Championship Series	66th	Holden VY Commodore	Robert Smith Racing
2005	Australian Formula Ford Championship	11th	Spectrum 010 Ford	TTM Group
2005	HPDC V8 Supercar Series	13th	Holden VY Commodore	Robert Smith Racing
2005	V8 Supercar Championship Series	44th	Holden VZ Commodore	Garry Rogers Motorsport
2006	V8 Supercar Championship Series	20th	Holden VZ Commodore	Garry Rogers Motorsport
2007	V8 Supercar Championship Series	15th	Holden VZ Commodore; Holden VE Commodore	Garry Rogers Motorsport
2008	V8 Supercar Championship Series	11th	Holden VE Commodore	Garry Rogers Motorsport
2009	V8 Supercar Championship Series	10th	Holden VE Commodore	Garry Rogers Motorsport
2010	V8 Supercar Championship Series	7th	Holden VE Commodore	Garry Rogers Motorsport
2011	International V8 Supercars Championship	8th	Holden VE Commodore	Garry Rogers Motorsport
2012	International V8 Supercars Championship	8th	Ford FG Falcon	Stone Brothers Racing
2013	Australian GT Championship	23rd	Mercedes-Benz SLS AMG GT3	Erebus Motorsport
2013	International V8 Supercars Championship	20th	Mercedes-Benz E63 AMG	Erebus Motorsport
2013	V8 SuperTourers Championship	19th	Holden VE Commodore	Edgell Performance Racing
2014	International V8 Supercars Championship	20th	Mercedes-Benz E63 AMG	Erebus Motorsport
2015	International V8 Supercars Championship	14th	Holden VF Commodore	Team 18
2016	International V8 Supercars Championship	24th	Holden VF Commodore	Team 18
2017	Supercars Championship	16th	Holden VF Commodore	Team 18
2018	Supercars Championship	21st	Holden ZB Commodore	Team 18
2019	Supercars Championship	10th	Ford Mustang GT	Tickford Racing
2020	Supercars Championship	11th	Ford Mustang GT	Tickford Racing
2021	Supercars Championship	28th	Holden ZB Commodore	Walkinshaw Andretti United
2022	Supercars Championship	13th	Ford Mustang GT	Grove Racing
2023	Repco Supercars Championship	33rd	Ford Mustang GT	Walkinshaw Andretti United
2024	Repco Supercars Championship	31st	Ford Mustang GT	Walkinshaw Andretti United

=== Super2 Series results ===
Super2 Series results
Year	Team	No.	Car	1	2	3	4	5	6	7	8	9	10	11	12	13	14	15	16	17	18	Position	Points
2004	Robert Smith Racing	72	Holden VX Commodore	WAK; R1; 12	WAK; R2; 13	WAK; R3; 6	ADE; R4; Ret	ADE; R5; DNS	WIN; R6; 28	WIN; R7; Ret	WIN; R8; 10	EAS; R9; 30	EAS; R10; 1	EAS; R11; Ret	QLD; R12; 3	QLD; R13; 7	QLD; R14; 3	MAL; R15; 8	MAL; R16; 11	MAL; R17; 17		13th	560
2005	Robert Smith Racing	72	Holden VY Commodore	ADE; R1	ADE; R2	WAK; R3	WAK; R4	WAK; R5	EAS; R6; 24	EAS; R7; 1	EAS; R8; 4	QLD; R9; 4	QLD; R10; 4	QLD; R11; 5	MAL; R12; Ret	MAL; R13; 7	MAL; R14; Ret	BAT; R15; 8	BAT; R16; C	PHI; R17; 5	PHI; R18; 5	13th	607

=== Supercars Championship results ===
Supercars results
Year	Team	No.	Car	1	2	3	4	5	6	7	8	9	10	11	12	13	14	15	16	17	18	19	20	21	22	23	24	25	26	27	28	29	30	31	32	33	34	35	36	37	38	39	Position	Points
2004	Robert Smith Racing	14	Holden VY Commodore	ADE; R1	ADE; R2	EAS; R3	PUK; R4	PUK; R5	PUK; R6	HDV; R7	HDV; R8	HDV; R9	BAR; R10	BAR; R11	BAR; R12	QLD; R13	WIN; R14	ORA; R15	ORA; R16	SAN; R17; Ret	BAT; R18; Ret	SUR; R19	SUR; R20	SYM; R21	SYM; R22	SYM; R23	EAS; R24; 24	EAS; R25; 29	EAS; R26; 29														66th	34
2005	Garry Rogers Motorsport	33	Holden VZ Commodore	ADE; R1	ADE; R2	PUK; R3	PUK; R4	PUK; R5	BAR; R6	BAR; R7	BAR; R8	EAS; R9	EAS; R10	SHA; R11	SHA; R12	SHA; R13	HDV; R14	HDV; R15	HDV; R16	QLD; R17	ORA; R18	ORA; R19	SAN; R20; 20	BAT; R21; Ret	SUR; R22	SUR; R23	SUR; R24	SYM; R25	SYM; R26	SYM; R27													44th	162
2005	Garry Rogers Motorsport	34	Holden VZ Commodore																												PHI; R28; 25	PHI; R29; 23	PHI; R30; 28										44th	162
2006	Garry Rogers Motorsport	33	Holden VZ Commodore	ADE; R1; 18	ADE; R2; 24	PUK; R3; 19	PUK; R4; 16	PUK; R5; 16	BAR; R6; 24	BAR; R7; 12	BAR; R8; 24	WIN; R9; 16	WIN; R10; 16	WIN; R11; 12	HDV; R12; 28	HDV; R13; 20	HDV; R14; 19	QLD; R15; 18	QLD; R16; Ret	QLD; R17; 20	ORA; R18; 25	ORA; R19; 3	ORA; R20; 6	SAN; R21; 6	BAT; R22; 17	SUR; R23; 21	SUR; R24; 23	SUR; R25; Ret	SYM; R26; 22	SYM; R27; 24	SYM; R28; 22	BHR; R29; 15	BHR; R30; 14	BHR; R31; 26	PHI; R32; 18	PHI; R33; 11	PHI; R34; 21						20th	1811
2007	Garry Rogers Motorsport	33	Holden VZ Commodore	ADE; R1; 24	ADE; R2; 12	BAR; R3; 9	BAR; R4; 9	BAR; R5; 11	PUK; R6; 17	PUK; R7; 13	PUK; R8; 17	WIN; R9; 5	WIN; R10; Ret	WIN; R11; DNS	EAS; R12; 23	EAS; R13; 12	EAS; R14; Ret	HDV; R15; 14	HDV; R16; 17	HDV; R17; 10																							15th	209
2007	Garry Rogers Motorsport	33	Holden VE Commodore																		QLD; R18; Ret	QLD; R19; 10	QLD; R20; 10	ORA; R21; 10	ORA; R22; 4	ORA; R23; 1	SAN; R24; 5	BAT; R25; Ret	SUR; R26; 12	SUR; R27; 27	SUR; R28; 14	BHR; R29; Ret	BHR; R30; 25	BHR; R31; 12	SYM; R32; Ret	SYM; R33; 13	SYM; R34; 12	PHI; R35; 11	PHI; R36; 10	PHI; R37; 11			15th	209
2008	Garry Rogers Motorsport	33	Holden VE Commodore	ADE; R1; 4	ADE; R2; 2	EAS; R3; 8	EAS; R4; 8	EAS; R5; 11	HAM; R6; 5	HAM; R7; 4	HAM; R8; Ret	BAR; R29; 24	BAR; R10; Ret	BAR; R11; 23	SAN; R12; 11	SAN; R13; 22	SAN; R14; 8	HDV; R15; 13	HDV; R16; 17	HDV; R17; 16	QLD; R18; 10	QLD; R19; 18	QLD; R20; 10	WIN; R21; 18	WIN; R22; 7	WIN; R23; 3	PHI; Q 5	PHI; R24; 5	BAT; R25; Ret	SUR; R26; 10	SUR; R27; 4	SUR; R28; 17	BHR; R29; 3	BHR; R30; 12	BHR; R31; 8	SYM; R32; 10	SYM; R33; 7	SYM; R34; 9	ORA; R35; 12	ORA; R36; 25	ORA; R37; 6		11th	2065
2009	Garry Rogers Motorsport	33	Holden VE Commodore	ADE; R1; 2	ADE; R2; 5	HAM; R3; 3	HAM; R4; 4	WIN; R5; 23	WIN; R6; Ret	SYM; R7; 10	SYM; R8; 5	HDV; R9; 10	HDV; R10; 7	TOW; R11; Ret	TOW; R12; 7	SAN; R13; 18	SAN; R14; 11	QLD; R15; 7	QLD; R16; 16	PHI; Q 18	PHI; R17; Ret	BAT; R18; 3	SUR; R19; Ret	SUR; R20; 14	SUR; R21; 22	SUR; R22; 12	PHI; R23; 7	PHI; R24; 13	BAR; R25; 12	BAR; R26; Ret	SYD; R27; 4	SYD; R28; Ret											10th	2006
2010	Garry Rogers Motorsport	33	Holden VE Commodore	YMC; R1; 5	YMC; R2; 7	BHR; R3; 12	BHR; R4; 5	ADE; R5; 3	ADE; R6; 11	HAM; R7; 10	HAM; R8; 4	QLD; R9; 7	QLD; R10; 23	WIN; R11; 10	WIN; R12; 3	HDV; R13; 22	HDV; R14; 12	TOW; R15; 4	TOW; R16; 15	PHI; Q 11	PHI; R17; Ret	BAT; R18; 7	SUR; R19; 19	SUR; R20; 9	SYM; R21; 10	SYM; R22; 10	SAN; R23; 6	SAN; R24; 4	SYD; R25; 7	SYD; R26; 1													7th	2387
2011	Garry Rogers Motorsport	33	Holden VE Commodore	YMC; R1; 9	YMC; R2; 22	ADE; R3; 20	ADE; R4; Ret	HAM; R5; 22	HAM; R6; 2	BAR; R7; 16	BAR; R8; 9	BAR; R9; 18	WIN; R10; 2	WIN; R11; 15	HID; R12; 4	HID; R13; 15	TOW; R14; 6	TOW; R15; 6	QLD; R16; 7	QLD; R17; 11	QLD; R18; 18	PHI; Q 11	PHI; R19; 12	BAT; R20; 17	SUR; R21; 10	SUR; R22; 3	SYM; R23; 16	SYM; R24; 13	SAN; R25; 17	SAN; R26; 8	SYD; R27; 14	SYD; R28; Ret											8th	1920
2012	Stone Brothers Racing	4	Ford FG Falcon	ADE; R1; 5	ADE; R2; 8	SYM; R3; 9	SYM; R4; 6	HAM; R5; 13	HAM; R6; 6	BAR; R7; 4	BAR; R8; 5	BAR; R9; 21	PHI; R10; 5	PHI; R11; 9	HID; R12; 10	HID; R13; 12	TOW; R14; 9	TOW; R15; 26	QLD; R16; 26	QLD; R17; Ret	SMP; R18; 26	SMP; R19; 21	SAN; Q 13	SAN; R20; 8	BAT; R21; 8	SUR; R22; Ret	SUR; R23; 8	YMC; R24; 5	YMC; R25; 8	YMC; R26; 8	WIN; R27; 3	WIN; R28; 10	SYD; R29; DNS	SYD; R30; 12									8th	2189
2013	Erebus Motorsport	4	Mercedes-Benz E63 AMG	ADE; R1; 17	ADE; R2; 17	SYM; R3; 23	SYM; R4; 17	SYM; R5; 13	PUK; R6; 18	PUK; R7; 25	PUK; R8; 17	PUK; R9; 22	BAR; R10; 18	BAR; R11; Ret	BAR; R12; 14	COA; R13; 27	COA; R14; 20	COA; R15; 21	COA; R16; 20	HID; R17; 18	HID; R18; 16	HID; R19; Ret	TOW; R20; Ret	TOW; R21; Ret	QLD; R22; Ret	QLD; R23; Ret	QLD; R24; 18	WIN; R25; 26	WIN; R26; 20	WIN; R27; 20	SAN; QR; 19	SAN; R28; 4	BAT; R29; 14	SUR; R30; 12	SUR; R31; 5	PHI; R32; 14	PHI; R33; 17	PHI; R34; Ret	SYD; R35; 23	SYD; R36; 13			20th	1361
2014	Erebus Motorsport	4	Mercedes-Benz E63 AMG	ADE; R1; 17	ADE; R2; 17	ADE; R3; 16	SYM; R4; 16	SYM; R5; 9	SYM; R6; 12	WIN; R7; 5	WIN; R8; 1	WIN; R9; 15	PUK; R10; 12	PUK; R11; 14	PUK; R12; 17	PUK; R13; 15	BAR; R14; 5	BAR; R15; 12	BAR; R16; 18	HID; R17; 10	HID; R18; Ret	HID; R19; 12	TOW; R20; 22	TOW; R21; 15	TOW; R22; 15	QLD; R23; 17	QLD; R24; 18	QLD; R25; 23	SMP; R26; 10	SMP; R27; 15	SMP; R28; 13	SAN; QR; 12	SAN; R29; Ret	BAT; R30; Ret	SUR; R31; 11	SUR; R32; Ret	PHI; R33; 19	PHI; R34; 20	PHI; R35; 13	SYD; R36; 17	SYD; R37; 24	SYD; R38; 18	20th	1395
2015	Team 18	18	Holden VF Commodore	ADE; R1; 9	ADE; R2; 10	ADE; R3; Ret	SYM; R4; 22	SYM; R5; 11	SYM; R6; 16	BAR; R7; 14	BAR; R8; 14	BAR; R9; 17	WIN; R10; 18	WIN; R11; Ret	WIN; R12; 15	HID; R13; 13	HID; R14; 18	HID; R15; 18	TOW; R16; 13	TOW; R17; 7	QLD; R18; 15	QLD; R19; 21	QLD; R20; 18	SMP; R21; 14	SMP; R22; 7	SMP; R23; 13	SAN; QR; 7	SAN; R24; 7	BAT; R25; 9	SUR; R26; Ret	SUR; R27; 14	PUK; R28; 13	PUK; R29; 16	PUK; R30; 8	PHI; R31; 16	PHI; R32; 18	PHI; R33; Ret	SYD; R34; 18	SYD; R35; 10	SYD; R36; 7			14th	1699
2016	Team 18	18	Holden VF Commodore	ADE; R1; 23	ADE; R2; 21	ADE; R3; 18	SYM; R4; 12	SYM; R5; 9	PHI; R6; 15	PHI; R7; 19	BAR; R8; 15	BAR; R9; 12	WIN; R10; 10	WIN; R11; Ret	HID; R12; 8	HID; R13; Ret	TOW; R14	TOW; R15	QLD; R16	QLD; R17	SMP; R18	SMP; R19	SAN; QR; 15	SAN; R20; 12	BAT; R21; Ret	SUR; R22; Ret	SUR; R23; 7	PUK; R24; 15	PUK; R25; 19	PUK; R26; 14	PUK; R27; 15	SYD; R28; 16	SYD; R29; 15										24th	1114
2017	Team 18	18	Holden VF Commodore	ADE; R1; 13	ADE; R2; 18	SYM; R3; 12	SYM; R4; 17	PHI; R5; 22	PHI; R6; 5	BAR; R7; 15	BAR; R8; 20	WIN; R9; 11	WIN; R10; 10	HID; R11; 10	HID; R12; 12	TOW; R13; 11	TOW; R14; 15	QLD; R15; 12	QLD; R16; 20	SMP; R17; 15	SMP; R18; 15	SAN; QR; 12	SAN; R19; 8	BAT; R20; Ret	SUR; R21; Ret	SUR; R22; 8	PUK; R23; 10	PUK; R24; Ret	NEW; R25; 4	NEW; R26; 8													16th	1647
2018	Team 18	18	Holden ZB Commodore	ADE; R1; 12	ADE; R2; 24	MEL; R3; 19	MEL; R4; 15	MEL; R5; 19	MEL; R6; 23	SYM; R7; 11	SYM; R8; 23	PHI; R9; 22	PHI; R10; 25	BAR; R11; 23	BAR; R12; 18	WIN; R13; 23	WIN; R14; 21	HID; R15; 21	HID; R16; Ret	TOW; R17; 18	TOW; R18; 15	QLD; R19; 24	QLD; R20; 21	SMP; R21; 12	BEN; R22; 20	BEN; R23; Ret	SAN; QR; 21	SAN; R24; 23	BAT; R25; 21	SUR; R26; 15	SUR; R27; C	PUK; R28; 15	PUK; R29; 14	NEW; R30; 12	NEW; R31; 9								21st	1443
2019	Tickford Racing	5	Ford Mustang 550	ADE; R1; 21	ADE; R2; 11	MEL; R3; 9	MEL; R4; 12	MEL; R5; 12	MEL; R6; 9	SYM; R7; 13	SYM; R8; 9	PHI; R9; 15	PHI; R10; 14	BAR; R11; 9	BAR; R12; 9	WIN; R13; 22	WIN; R14; 5	HID; R15; 6	HID; R16; 7	TOW; R17; 10	TOW; R18; 8	QLD; R19; 7	QLD; R20; 14	BEN; R21; 13	BEN; R22; 9	PUK; R23; 5	PUK; R24; 15	BAT; R25; 9	SUR; R26; 6	SUR; R27; 6	SAN; QR; 7	SAN; R28; 3	NEW; R29; 12	NEW; R30; 23									10th	2428
2020	Tickford Racing	5	Ford Mustang 550	ADE; R1; 12	ADE; R2; 6	MEL; R3; C	MEL; R4; C	MEL; R5; C	MEL; R6; C	SMP1; R7; 7	SMP1; R8; 13	SMP1; R9; 2	SMP2; R10; 2	SMP2; R11; 19	SMP2; R12; 15	HID1; R13; 10	HID1; R14; 14	HID1; R15; 12	HID2; R16; 7	HID2; R17; 8	HID2; R18; 12	TOW1; R19; 13	TOW1; R20; 11	TOW1; R21; 9	TOW2; R22; 16	TOW2; R23; 8	TOW2; R24; 10	BEN1; R25; 12	BEN1; R26; 23	BEN1; R27; 11	BEN2; R28; 13	BEN2; R29; Ret	BEN2; R30; 9	BAT; R31; 7									11th	1553
2021	Walkinshaw Andretti United	25	Holden ZB Commodore	BAT1; R1	BAT1; R2	SAN; R3	SAN; R4	SAN; R5	SYM; R6	SYM; R7	SYM; R8	BEN; R9	BEN; R10	BEN; R11	HID; R12	HID; R13	HID; R14	TOW1; R15	TOW1; R16	TOW2; R17	TOW2; R18	TOW2; R19	SMP1; R20	SMP1; R21	SMP1; R22	SMP2; R23	SMP2; R24	SMP2; R25	SMP3; R26	SMP3; R27	SMP3; R28	SMP4; R29; PO	SMP4; R30; PO	BAT2; R31; 1									28th	300
2022	Grove Racing	10	Ford Mustang 550	SMP; R1; 21	SMP; R2; 16	SYM; R3; 9	SYM; R4; 9	SYM; R5; 14	MEL; R6; 22	MEL; R7; 3	MEL; R8; 13	MEL; R9; 10	BAR; R10; 11	BAR; R11; 21	BAR; R12; 12	WIN; R13; 5	WIN; R14; 4	WIN; R15; 6	HID; R16; 15	HID; R17; 12	HID; R18; 16	TOW; R19; 17	TOW; R20; 23	BEN; R21; 15	BEN; R22; 22	BEN; R23; 10	SAN; R24; 24	SAN; R25; 18	SAN; R26; 18	PUK; R27; 12	PUK; R28; 12	PUK; R29; 14	BAT; R30; 6	SUR; R31; 15	SUR; R32; Ret	ADE; R33; 10	ADE; R34; 9						13th	1724
2023	Walkinshaw Andretti United	25	Ford Mustang 650	NEW; R1	NEW; R2	MEL; R3	MEL; R4	MEL; R5	MEL; R6	BAR; R7	BAR; R8	BAR; R9	SYM; R10	SYM; R11	SYM; R12	HID; R13	HID; R14	HID; R15	TOW; R16	TOW; R17	SMP; R18	SMP; R19	BEN; R20	BEN; R21	BEN; R22	SAN; R23; 22	BAT; R24; 4	SUR; R25	SUR; R26	ADE; R27	ADE; R28												33rd	318
2024	Walkinshaw Andretti United	25	Ford Mustang 650	BAT1; R1	BAT1; R2	MEL; R3	MEL; R4	MEL; R5	MEL; R6	TAU; R7	TAU; R8	BAR; R9	BAR; R10	HID; R11	HID; R12	TOW; R13	TOW; R14	SMP; R15	SMP; R16	SYM; R17	SYM; R18	SAN; R19; 7	BAT; R20; 5	SUR; R21	SUR; R22	ADE; R23	ADE; R24																31st	414
2025	Team 18	20	Chevrolet Camaro ZL1	SYD; R1	SYD; R2	SYD; R3	MEL; R4	MEL; R5	MEL; R6	MEL; R7	TAU; R8	TAU; R9	TAU; R10	SYM; R11	SYM; R12	SYM; R13	BAR; R14	BAR; R15	BAR; R16	HID; R17	HID; R18	HID; R19	TOW; R20	TOW; R21	TOW; R22	QLD; R23	QLD; R24	QLD; R25	BEN; R26; 13	BAT; R27; 2	SUR; R28	SUR; R29	SAN; R30	SAN; R31	ADE; R32	ADE; R33	ADE; R34						39th*	110*
2026	Team 18	18	Chevrolet Camaro ZL1	SMP; R1	SMP; R2	SMP; R3	MEL; R4	MEL; R5	MEL; R6	MEL; R7	TAU; R8	TAU; R9	TAU; R10	CHR; R11	CHR; R12	CHR; R13	SYM; R14	SYM; R15	SYM; R16	BAR; R17	BAR; R18	BAR; R19	HID; R20	HID; R21	HID; R22	TOW; R23	TOW; R24	TOW; R25	QLD; R26	QLD; R27	QLD; R28	BEN; R29	BAT; R30	SUR; R31	SUR; R32	SAN; R33	SAN; R34	ADE; R35	ADE; R36	ADE; R37				

=== Complete Bathurst 1000 results ===
Year	Team	Car	Co-driver	Position	Laps
2004	Smiths Trucks Racing	Holden Commodore VY	(Australia) Mark Noske	DNF	59
2005	Garry Rogers Motorsport	Holden Commodore VZ	(Australia) Phillip Scifleet	DNF	136
2006	Garry Rogers Motorsport	Holden Commodore VZ	(Australia) Dean Canto	17th	129
2007	Garry Rogers Motorsport	Holden Commodore VE	(Australia) Dean Canto	DNF	118
2008	Garry Rogers Motorsport	Holden Commodore VE	(Australia) Michael Caruso	DNF	139
2009	Garry Rogers Motorsport	Holden Commodore VE	(Australia) Michael Caruso	3rd	161
2010	Garry Rogers Motorsport	Holden Commodore VE	(Australia) David Besnard	7th	161
2011	Garry Rogers Motorsport	Holden Commodore VE	(Australia) Greg Ritter	17th	161
2012	Stone Brothers Racing	Ford Falcon FG	(New Zealand) Craig Baird	8th	161
2013	Erebus Motorsport	Mercedes-Benz E63 AMG	(New Zealand) Craig Baird	14th	161
2014	Erebus Motorsport	Mercedes-Benz E63 AMG	(New Zealand) Craig Baird	DNF	132
2015	Charlie Schwerkolt Racing	Holden Commodore VF	(France) Sébastien Bourdais	9th	161
2016	Charlie Schwerkolt Racing	Holden Commodore VF	(Australia) Karl Reindler	DNF	2
2017	Charlie Schwerkolt Racing	Holden Commodore VF	(Australia) Karl Reindler	DNF	76
2018	Charlie Schwerkolt Racing	Holden Commodore ZB	(Australia) Jason Bright	21st	157
2019	Tickford Racing	Ford Mustang S550	(Australia) Thomas Randle	9th	161
2020	Tickford Racing	Ford Mustang S550	(Australia) Michael Caruso	7th	161
2021	Walkinshaw Andretti United	Holden Commodore ZB	(Australia) Chaz Mostert	1st	161
2022	Grove Racing	Ford Mustang S550	(New Zealand) Matthew Payne	6th	161
2023	Walkinshaw Andretti United	Ford Mustang S650	(Australia) Chaz Mostert	4th	161
2024	Walkinshaw Andretti United	Ford Mustang S650	(Australia) Chaz Mostert	5th	161
2025	Team 18	Chevrolet Camaro Mk.6	(Australia) David Reynolds	2nd	161
2026	Team 18	Chevrolet Camaro Mk.6	(Australia) Anton De Pasquale	DNF	160

=== TCR Australia results ===
TCR Australia results
Year	Team	Car	1	2	3	4	5	6	7	8	9	10	11	12	13	14	15	Position	Points
2021	Ashley Seward Motorsport	Alfa Romeo Giulietta Veloce TCR	SYM; R1; 1	SYM; R2; 2	SYM; R3; 3	PHI; R4; 3	PHI; R5; 16	PHI; R6; 19	BAT; R7; 5	BAT; R8; 6	BAT; R9; Ret	SMP; R10; 8	SMP; R11; 8	SMP; R12; 16	BAT; R13; WD	BAT; R14; WD	BAT; R15; WD	13th	315

Sporting positions
Preceded by Shane van Gisbergen; Garth Tander	Winner of the Bathurst 1000; 2021; With: Chaz Mostert	Succeeded by Shane van Gisbergen; Garth Tander
Preceded by Jamie Whincup	Barry Sheene Medal; 2022	Succeeded by Chaz Mostert
