= 2015 Winton Super Sprint =

2015 V8 Supercar championship race

(Victoria (state)) 2015 NP300 Navara Winton Super Sprint
Event Information
- Round 4 of 14 in the 2015 International V8 Supercars Championship
- Date: 15–17 May 2015
- Location: Benalla, Victoria
- Venue: Winton Motor Raceway
- Weather: Fine

Results
Race 1
Distance	20 laps	60 km
Pole position	Chaz Mostert; Prodrive Racing Australia	1:25.1215
Winner	Chaz Mostert; Prodrive Racing Australia	28:40.0082
Race 2
Distance	20 laps	60 km
Pole position	Chaz Mostert; Prodrive Racing Australia	1:24.0970
Winner	Mark Winterbottom; Prodrive Racing Australia	28:38.3167
Race 3
Distance	67 laps	200 km
Pole position	Chaz Mostert; Prodrive Racing Australia	1:23.1334
Winner	Mark Winterbottom; Prodrive Racing Australia	1:40:41.5757

The 2015 NP300 Navara Winton Super Sprint was a motor race for V8 Supercars held on the weekend of 15–17 May 2015. The event was held at Winton Motor Raceway in Benalla, Victoria, and consisted of two sprint races, each over a distance of 60 kilometres (37 miles) and one endurance race over a distance of 200 kilometres (124 miles). It was the fourth round of fourteen in the 2015 International V8 Supercars Championship.

After scoring his first two pole positions of his career, Prodrive Racing Australia's Chaz Mostert added another two poles for both Saturday races. He was to start alongside Michael Caruso for Race 10 – his and Nissan's first front row start for the year. Mostert stayed at the front of the field to take his first race win of the year, ahead of teammate Mark Winterbottom. Caruso held on to finish on the podium.

Race 11 saw Winterbottom take the lead early from Mostert at the first corner, while in the mid pack, it was not so great for the Holden Racing Team drivers. James Courtney drove in deep at turn 1 taking out his teammate Garth Tander, with Lee Holdsworth and James Moffat also forced off the road. Andre Heimgartner was also unlucky after being spun around by Dale Wood on the old pit straight. Winterbottom and Mostert stayed out of trouble to finish first and third respectively. Rick Kelly finished in second place – his first podium finish since 2011.

Again the Ford FG X Falcons were fast in qualifying and Mostert took a clean sweep of pole positions for the weekend, with Winterbottom on the front row. It was smooth sailing for Mostert until after first pit stops were completed, where he lost the rear of the car by driving wide on entry to turn 4 and backing into the tyre barrier on exit. Craig Lowndes was in a position to take his 100th career victory, but Winterbottom was too quick – taking his fourth victory of the year. Fabian Coulthard again scoring well in the 200 kilometres (124 miles) races by taking second place, with Lowndes coming home in third position.

== Results ==
=== Race 10 ===
Pos.	No.	Driver	Car	Team	Laps	Time/Retired	Grid	Points
1	6	(Australia) Chaz Mostert	Ford FG X Falcon	Prodrive Racing Australia	20	28:40.0082	1	75
2	5	(Australia) Mark Winterbottom	Ford FG X Falcon	Prodrive Racing Australia	20	+2.8 s	4	69
3	23	(Australia) Michael Caruso	Nissan Altima L33	Nissan Motorsport	20	+5.1 s	2	64
4	55	(Australia) David Reynolds	Ford FG X Falcon	Rod Nash Racing	20	+6.5 s	3	60
5	7	(Australia) Todd Kelly	Nissan Altima L33	Nissan Motorsport	20	+9.0 s	5	55
6	14	(New Zealand) Fabian Coulthard	Holden VF Commodore	Brad Jones Racing	20	+10.8 s	6	51
7	15	(Australia) Rick Kelly	Nissan Altima L33	Nissan Motorsport	20	+12.2 s	7	48
8	97	(New Zealand) Shane van Gisbergen	Holden VF Commodore	Tekno Autosports	20	+14.9 s	9	45
9	1	(Australia) Jamie Whincup	Holden VF Commodore	Triple Eight Race Engineering	20	+15.1 s	8	42
10	222	(Australia) Nick Percat	Holden VF Commodore	Lucas Dumbrell Motorsport	20	+18.3 s	12	39
11	8	(Australia) Jason Bright	Holden VF Commodore	Brad Jones Racing	20	+19.1 s	10	36
12	888	(Australia) Craig Lowndes	Holden VF Commodore	Triple Eight Race Engineering	20	+19.5 s	14	34
13	9	(Australia) Will Davison	Mercedes-Benz E63 AMG	Erebus Motorsport	20	+21.2 s	11	33
14	22	(Australia) James Courtney	Holden VF Commodore	Holden Racing Team	20	+21.8 s	16	31
15	17	(Australia) Scott Pye	Ford FG X Falcon	DJR Team Penske	20	+22.3 s	15	30
16	2	(Australia) Garth Tander	Holden VF Commodore	Holden Racing Team	20	+22.6 s	17	28
17	99	(Australia) James Moffat	Nissan Altima L33	Nissan Motorsport	20	+25.7 s	13	27
18	18	(Australia) Lee Holdsworth	Holden VF Commodore	Charlie Schwerkolt Racing	20	+26.0 s	20	25
19	47	(Australia) Tim Slade	Holden VF Commodore	Walkinshaw Racing	20	+26.5 s	19	24
20	111	(New Zealand) Andre Heimgartner	Ford FG X Falcon	Super Black Racing	20	+27.8 s	18	22
21	34	(Australia) David Wall	Volvo S60	Garry Rogers Motorsport	20	+29.8 s	23	21
22	4	(Australia) Ashley Walsh	Mercedes-Benz E63 AMG	Erebus Motorsport	20	+33.2 s	22	19
23	3	(Australia) Tim Blanchard	Holden VF Commodore	Lucas Dumbrell Motorsport	20	+37.4 s	24	18
24	21	(Australia) Dale Wood	Holden VF Commodore	Britek Motorsport	20	+41.5 s	21	16
25	33	(New Zealand) Scott McLaughlin	Volvo S60	Garry Rogers Motorsport	20	+75.4 s	25	15

=== Race 11 ===
Pos.	No.	Driver	Car	Team	Laps	Time/Retired	Grid	Points
1	5	(Australia) Mark Winterbottom	Ford FG X Falcon	Prodrive Racing Australia	20	28:38.3167	2	75
2	15	(Australia) Rick Kelly	Nissan Altima L33	Nissan Motorsport	20	+0.8 s	4	69
3	6	(Australia) Chaz Mostert	Ford FG X Falcon	Prodrive Racing Australia	20	+2.6 s	1	64
4	55	(Australia) David Reynolds	Ford FG X Falcon	Rod Nash Racing	20	+2.9 s	3	60
5	97	(New Zealand) Shane van Gisbergen	Holden VF Commodore	Tekno Autosports	20	+4.5 s	7	55
6	1	(Australia) Jamie Whincup	Holden VF Commodore	Triple Eight Race Engineering	20	+4.8 s	6	51
7	9	(Australia) Will Davison	Mercedes-Benz E63 AMG	Erebus Motorsport	20	+7.9 s	5	48
8	888	(Australia) Craig Lowndes	Holden VF Commodore	Triple Eight Race Engineering	20	+8.8 s	10	45
9	33	(New Zealand) Scott McLaughlin	Volvo S60	Garry Rogers Motorsport	20	+11.3 s	9	42
10	23	(Australia) Michael Caruso	Nissan Altima L33	Nissan Motorsport	20	+11.8 s	8	39
11	47	(Australia) Tim Slade	Holden VF Commodore	Walkinshaw Racing	20	+12.2 s	15	36
12	222	(Australia) Nick Percat	Holden VF Commodore	Lucas Dumbrell Motorsport	20	+15.0 s	20	34
13	7	(Australia) Todd Kelly	Nissan Altima L33	Nissan Motorsport	20	+15.2 s	18	33
14	8	(Australia) Jason Bright	Holden VF Commodore	Brad Jones Racing	20	+16.5 s	19	31
15	4	(Australia) Ashley Walsh	Mercedes-Benz E63 AMG	Erebus Motorsport	20	+22.1 s	16	30
16	3	(Australia) Tim Blanchard	Holden VF Commodore	Lucas Dumbrell Motorsport	20	+23.7 s	23	28
17	21	(Australia) Dale Wood	Holden VF Commodore	Britek Motorsport	20	+28.3 s	22	27
18	17	(Australia) Scott Pye	Ford FG X Falcon	DJR Team Penske	20	+29.0 s	21	25
19	34	(Australia) David Wall	Volvo S60	Garry Rogers Motorsport	20	+29.3 s	24	24
20	111	(New Zealand) Andre Heimgartner	Ford FG X Falcon	Super Black Racing	20	+29.9 s	17	22
21	14	(New Zealand) Fabian Coulthard	Holden VF Commodore	Brad Jones Racing	20	+34.0 s	25	21
22	99	(Australia) James Moffat	Nissan Altima L33	Nissan Motorsport	20	+72.5 s	14	19
23	22	(Australia) James Courtney	Holden VF Commodore	Holden Racing Team	19	+1 lap	13	18
DNF	2	(Australia) Garth Tander	Holden VF Commodore	Holden Racing Team	0		11	
DNF	18	(Australia) Lee Holdsworth	Holden VF Commodore	Charlie Schwerkolt Racing	0		12	

=== Race 12 ===
Pos.	No.	Driver	Car	Team	Laps	Time/Retired	Grid	Points
1	5	(Australia) Mark Winterbottom	Ford FG X Falcon	Prodrive Racing Australia	67	1:40:41.5757	2	150
2	14	(New Zealand) Fabian Coulthard	Holden VF Commodore	Brad Jones Racing	67	+1.9 s	7	138
3	888	(Australia) Craig Lowndes	Holden VF Commodore	Triple Eight Race Engineering	67	+5.8 s	8	129
4	23	(Australia) Michael Caruso	Nissan Altima L33	Nissan Motorsport	67	+17.7 s	4	120
5	2	(Australia) Garth Tander	Holden VF Commodore	Holden Racing Team	67	+22.7 s	17	111
6	55	(Australia) David Reynolds	Ford FG X Falcon	Rod Nash Racing	67	+24.1 s	3	102
7	22	(Australia) James Courtney	Holden VF Commodore	Holden Racing Team	67	+24.6 s	16	96
8	17	(Australia) Scott Pye	Ford FG X Falcon	DJR Team Penske	67	+26.3 s	9	90
9	33	(New Zealand) Scott McLaughlin	Volvo S60	Garry Rogers Motorsport	67	+29.8 s	11	84
10	1	(Australia) Jamie Whincup	Holden VF Commodore	Triple Eight Race Engineering	67	+31.0 s	22	78
11	15	(Australia) Rick Kelly	Nissan Altima L33	Nissan Motorsport	67	+33.6 s	6	72
12	7	(Australia) Todd Kelly	Nissan Altima L33	Nissan Motorsport	67	+33.7 s	14	69
13	8	(Australia) Jason Bright	Holden VF Commodore	Brad Jones Racing	67	+37.3 s	18	66
14	47	(Australia) Tim Slade	Holden VF Commodore	Walkinshaw Racing	67	+48.2 s	15	63
15	18	(Australia) Lee Holdsworth	Holden VF Commodore	Charlie Schwerkolt Racing	67	+49.5 s	19	60
16	222	(Australia) Nick Percat	Holden VF Commodore	Lucas Dumbrell Motorsport	67	+53.1 s	21	57
17	111	(New Zealand) Andre Heimgartner	Ford FG X Falcon	Super Black Racing	67	+53.2 s	12	54
18	34	(Australia) David Wall	Volvo S60	Garry Rogers Motorsport	67	+53.8 s	23	51
19	99	(Australia) James Moffat	Nissan Altima L33	Nissan Motorsport	67	+54.4 s	20	48
20	3	(Australia) Tim Blanchard	Holden VF Commodore	Lucas Dumbrell Motorsport	67	+56.9 s	24	45
21	21	(Australia) Dale Wood	Holden VF Commodore	Britek Motorsport	67	+60.0 s	25	42
22	4	(Australia) Ashley Walsh	Mercedes-Benz E63 AMG	Erebus Motorsport	67	+67.9 s	13	39
23	97	(New Zealand) Shane van Gisbergen	Holden VF Commodore	Tekno Autosports	67	+70.2 s	10	36
24	9	(Australia) Will Davison	Mercedes-Benz E63 AMG	Erebus Motorsport	67	+86.7 s	5	33
25	6	(Australia) Chaz Mostert	Ford FG X Falcon	Prodrive Racing Australia	63	+4 laps	1	30

== Championship standings ==
- After Race 12 of 36

Drivers' Championship standings

Pos.	Driver	Points
1	(Australia) Mark Winterbottom	937
2	(Australia) Craig Lowndes	925
3	(New Zealand) Fabian Coulthard	851
4	(Australia) Jamie Whincup	801
5	(Australia) James Courtney	795

Teams' Championship standings

Pos.	Constructor	Points
1	Triple Eight Race Engineering	1726
2	Prodrive Racing Australia	1651
3	Holden Racing Team	1544
4	Brad Jones Racing	1413
5	Nissan Motorsport (7/15)	1171

- Note: Only the top five positions are included for both sets of standings.
