= 2010 Hamilton 400 =

2010 V8 supercar race

(New Zealand) 2010 ITM Hamilton 400
Event Information
- Round 4 of 14 in the 2010 V8 Supercar Championship Series
- Date: 16–18 April 2010
- Location: Hamilton, New Zealand
- Venue: Hamilton Street Circuit
- Weather: Fine

Results
Race 1
| Distance | 59 laps | 200 km |
| Pole position | Jamie Whincup; Triple Eight Race Engineering | 1:23.2690 |
| Winner | Jamie Whincup; Triple Eight Race Engineering | 1:30:34.7140 |
Race 2
| Distance | 59 laps | 200 km |
| Pole position | Garth Tander; Holden Racing Team | 1:23.0349 |
| Winner | Jamie Whincup; Triple Eight Race Engineering | 1:27:53.1931 |

The 2010 Hamilton 400 (known for naming rights reasons as the 2010 ITM Hamilton 400) was the fourth round of the 2010 V8 Supercar Championship Series. It was the third V8 Supercar event to be held on the Hamilton Street Circuit and was held on the weekend of 16 to 18 April in Hamilton, New Zealand.

Jamie Whincup dominated the weekend by claiming pole position for the first race and taking a lights-to-flag victory. The following day, he would win again and would win the Mark Porter Memorial Trophy by way of accumulating the most points of any driver that weekend. Garth Tander took pole position for the second race and proved the closest contender to Whincup by placing second in both races.

Whincup's dominance marked his sixth win from eight races for 2010, and thus extended his lead in the championship standings to over 200 points over nearest competitor, James Courtney.

== Background ==
The event was held on the weekend of 16 to 18 April 2010. It was the third V8 Supercar event to be held on the Hamilton Street Circuit, and consisted of two 200 km races with compulsory pitstops in both instances.

The winner of the Hamilton 400 event would be awarded the Mark Porter Memorial Trophy, in memory of Mark Porter. Porter, born in Hamilton, died following a crash in a V8 Supercar Development Series support race to the 2006 Bathurst 1000.

=== Entry list ===
There were 30 drivers entered into this event with no changes made to the entry list from the previous round in Adelaide.

=== Support categories ===
| Category | Races | Round winner |
|---|---|---|
| New Zealand V8s | 3 | (New Zealand) John McIntyre (Ford Falcon (BF)) |
| NZ V8 Ute Racing Series | 3 | (New Zealand) Chris Pither (Ford Falcon (BF) Ute) |
| Suzuki Swift Sport Cup | 3 | (New Zealand) Angus Fogg (Suzuki Swift) |

== Race report ==
=== Race 7 ===
An even start saw pole sitter Jamie Whincup take the lead from Garth Tander at the first corner ahead of Michael Caruso, Craig Lowndes, Tony D'Alberto as Holdens dominated the start. Steven Johnson was the first Ford ahead of Rick Kelly, Fabian Coulthard, James Courtney and Mark Winterbottom. Yellows were waved on the opening lap after Shane van Gisbergen hit the wall over the back section of the circuit with both Russell Ingall and Dean Fiore striking glancing blows on the now limping Ford with Todd Kelly and Jason Bargwanna ending up spun backwards to the field in the ensuing chaos.

Tander forced his way into the lead in the early running, but once in front could not get away from Whincup. Light rain began in the opening laps, becoming more noticeable by about lap ten. A mechanical flag was waved at D'Alberto, ruining his best ever early race start, with flapping bodywork in the rear diffuser. Russell Ingall pitted on lap 12 with a misfire, diagnosed as a broken rocker. Cars began stopping for tyres on lap 16. Courtney the first of the leaders to pit along with Lee Holdsworth with Lowndes and Rick Kelly following on lap 17.

The round of pitstops completed saw Tander drop to third behind Whincup and Courtney. Daniel Gaunt hit the wall on lap 26 with Steven Richards pitting the following lap with mechanical issues. Both continued. After the second round of stops Tander settled back into second ahead of Courtney. Safety car was called for when Tim Slade stopped with his Ford unable to restart.

At the restart on lap 49 Whincup led from Tander, Courtney, Lowndes, Caruso, Steven Johnson, Mark Winterbottom, Rick Kelly and Paul Dumbrell. Fabian Coulthard turned Todd Kelly into a spin and Jonathon Webb also punting Greg Murphy into a spin. Alex Davison came to a halt with his portion of track blocked. All continued. Coulthard received a drive-through penalty. Top four pulled steadily away. Will Davison retired with an engine misfire after having climbed to the edge of the top ten after his qualifying accident left him buried in the grid.

Whincup pulled clear to claim his fifth race win of the year ahead of Tander, Courtney in the first Ford, Lowndes, Caruso, Johnson, Winterbottom, Rick Kelly, Dumbrell and Lee Holdsworth.

=== Race 8 ===
Qualifying was marred by a heavy collision with a wall by Andrew Thompson, his second consecutive street circuit crash after damaging his car sufficiently at the 2010 Clipsal 500 to miss the entire meeting. The Walkinshaw Racing team assessed the damage as to extensive to repair for the race. Garth Tander secured pole position after a last minute effort by Race 7 polesitter Jamie Whincup fell afoul traffic. Behind Whincup was Michael Caruso in a strong performance in the Garry Rogers Motorsport Commodore with Rick Kelly and Craig Lowndes completing a clean sweep of the top five for Holden. First Fords were the Dick Johnson Racing pair of James Courtney and Steven Johnson in sixth and seventh with Will Davison, Rick Kelly and Mark Winterbottom completing the top ten positions. In a disappointing session for the strong New Zealand contingent Shane van Gisbergen represented their best in twelfth.

== Race results ==
=== Race 7 ===
==== Qualifying ====
| Pos | No | Name | Team | Vehicle | Shootout | Qualifying |
|---|---|---|---|---|---|---|
| 1 | 1 | (Australia) Jamie Whincup | Triple Eight Race Engineering | Holden Commodore (VE) | 1:23.2690 | 1:23.3946 |
| 2 | 2 | (Australia) Garth Tander | Holden Racing Team | Holden Commodore (VE) | 1:23.4213 | 1:23.0653 |
| 3 | 34 | (Australia) Michael Caruso | Garry Rogers Motorsport | Holden Commodore (VE) | 1:23.5445 | 1:23.4214 |
| 5 | 17 | (Australia) Steven Johnson | Dick Johnson Racing | Ford Falcon (FG) | 1:23.6354 | 1:23.5259 |
| 6 | 24 | (New Zealand) Fabian Coulthard | Walkinshaw Racing | Holden Commodore (VE) | 1:23.6586 | 1:23.4416 |
| 7 | 15 | (Australia) Rick Kelly | Kelly Racing | Holden Commodore (VE) | 1:23.6760 | 1:23.5070 |
| 8 | 3 | (Australia) Tony D'Alberto | Tony D'Alberto Racing | Holden Commodore (VE) | 1:23.8081 | 1:23.3940 |
| 9 | 18 | (Australia) James Courtney | Dick Johnson Racing | Ford Falcon (FG) | 1:23.9163 | 1:23.2135 |
| 10 | 5 | (Australia) Mark Winterbottom | Ford Performance Racing | Ford Falcon (FG) | 1:23.9946 | 1:23.4899 |
| 10 | 888 | (Australia) Craig Lowndes | Triple Eight Race Engineering | Holden Commodore (VE) | 1:23.5799 | 1:23.5443 |
| 11 | 19 | (Australia) Jonathon Webb | Tekno Autosports | Ford Falcon (FG) | —N/a | 1:23.6329 |
| 12 | 55 | (Australia) Paul Dumbrell | Rod Nash Racing | Ford Falcon (FG) | —N/a | 1:23.6862 |
| 13 | 51 | (New Zealand) Greg Murphy | Paul Morris Motorsport | Holden Commodore (VE) | —N/a | 1:23.7699 |
| 14 | 33 | (Australia) Lee Holdsworth | Garry Rogers Motorsport | Holden Commodore (VE) | —N/a | 1:23.8011 |
| 15 | 8 | (New Zealand) Jason Richards | Brad Jones Racing | Holden Commodore (VE) | —N/a | 1:23.8467 |
| 16 | 6 | (New Zealand) Steven Richards | Ford Performance Racing | Ford Falcon (FG) | —N/a | 1:23.9119 |
| 17 | 10 | (Australia) Andrew Thompson | Walkinshaw Racing | Holden Commodore (VE) | —N/a | 1:23.9538 |
| 18 | 14 | (Australia) Jason Bright | Brad Jones Racing | Holden Commodore (VE) | —N/a | 1:23.9739 |
| 19 | 7 | (Australia) Todd Kelly | Kelly Racing | Holden Commodore (VE) | —N/a | 1:24.0221 |
| 20 | 39 | (Australia) Russell Ingall | Paul Morris Motorsport | Holden Commodore (VE) | —N/a | 1:24.0288 |
| 21 | 9 | (New Zealand) Shane van Gisbergen | Stone Brothers Racing | Ford Falcon (FG) | —N/a | 1:24.0839 |
| 22 | 11 | (Australia) Jason Bargwanna | Kelly Racing | Holden Commodore (VE) | —N/a | 1:24.0892 |
| 23 | 12 | (Australia) Dean Fiore | Triple F Racing | Ford Falcon (FG) | —N/a | 1:24.1773 |
| 24 | 22 | (Australia) Will Davison | Holden Racing Team | Holden Commodore (VE) | —N/a | 1:24.1897 |
| 25 | 47 | (Australia) Tim Slade | James Rosenberg Racing | Ford Falcon (FG) | —N/a | 1:24.2932 |
| 26 | 4 | (Australia) Alex Davison | Stone Brothers Racing | Ford Falcon (FG) | —N/a | 1:24.3191 |
| 27 | 30 | (New Zealand) Daniel Gaunt | Lucas Dumbrell Motorsport | Holden Commodore (VE) | —N/a | 1:24.9678 |
| 28 | 21 | (Australia) Karl Reindler | Britek Motorsport | Holden Commodore (VE) | —N/a | 1:25.1224 |
| 29 | 16 | (Australia) Tony Ricciardello | Kelly Racing | Holden Commodore (VE) | —N/a | 1:25.8922 |

==== Race ====
| Pos | No | Name | Team | Vehicle | Laps | Time/retired | Grid | Points |
|---|---|---|---|---|---|---|---|---|
| 1 | 1 | (Australia) Jamie Whincup | Triple Eight Race Engineering | Holden Commodore (VE) | 59 | 1:30:34.7140 | 1 | 150 |
| 2 | 2 | (Australia) Garth Tander | Holden Racing Team | Holden Commodore (VE) | 59 | + 2.422 | 2 | 138 |
| 3 | 18 | (Australia) James Courtney | Dick Johnson Racing | Ford Falcon (FG) | 59 | + 3.940 | 9 | 129 |
| 4 | 888 | (Australia) Craig Lowndes | Triple Eight Race Engineering | Holden Commodore (VE) | 59 | + 5.661 | 4 | 120 |
| 5 | 34 | (Australia) Michael Caruso | Garry Rogers Motorsport | Holden Commodore (VE) | 59 | + 10.198 | 3 | 111 |
| 6 | 17 | (Australia) Steven Johnson | Dick Johnson Racing | Ford Falcon (FG) | 59 | + 12.408 | 5 | 102 |
| 7 | 5 | (Australia) Mark Winterbottom | Ford Performance Racing | Ford Falcon (FG) | 59 | + 14.834 | 10 | 96 |
| 8 | 15 | (Australia) Rick Kelly | Kelly Racing | Holden Commodore (VE) | 59 | + 15.998 | 7 | 90 |
| 9 | 55 | (Australia) Paul Dumbrell | Rod Nash Racing | Ford Falcon (FG) | 59 | + 16.623 | 12 | 84 |
| 10 | 33 | (Australia) Lee Holdsworth | Garry Rogers Motorsport | Holden Commodore (VE) | 59 | + 16.862 | 14 | 78 |
| 11 | 8 | (New Zealand) Jason Richards | Brad Jones Racing | Holden Commodore (VE) | 59 | + 21.804 | 15 | 72 |
| 12 | 3 | (Australia) Tony D'Alberto | Tony D'Alberto Racing | Holden Commodore (VE) | 59 | + 22.823 | 8 | 69 |
| 13 | 19 | (Australia) Jonathon Webb | Tekno Autosports | Ford Falcon (FG) | 59 | + 23.387 | 11 | 66 |
| 14 | 10 | (Australia) Andrew Thompson | Walkinshaw Racing | Holden Commodore (VE) | 59 | + 24.801 | 17 | 63 |
| 15 | 11 | (Australia) Jason Bargwanna | Kelly Racing | Holden Commodore (VE) | 59 | + 28.274 | 22 | 60 |
| 16 | 21 | (Australia) Karl Reindler | Britek Motorsport | Holden Commodore (VE) | 59 | + 32.219 | 28 | 57 |
| 17 | 4 | (Australia) Alex Davison | Stone Brothers Racing | Ford Falcon (FG) | 59 | + 34.759 | 26 | 54 |
| 18 | 51 | (New Zealand) Greg Murphy | Paul Morris Motorsport | Holden Commodore (VE) | 59 | + 35.021 | 13 | 51 |
| 19 | 30 | (New Zealand) Daniel Gaunt | Lucas Dumbrell Motorsport | Holden Commodore (VE) | 59 | + 44.003 | 27 | 48 |
| 20 | 7 | (Australia) Todd Kelly | Kelly Racing | Holden Commodore (VE) | 59 | + 44.521 | 19 | 45 |
| 21 | 14 | (Australia) Jason Bright | Brad Jones Racing | Holden Commodore (VE) | 59 | + 56.843 | 18 | 42 |
| 22 | 24 | (New Zealand) Fabian Coulthard | Walkinshaw Racing | Holden Commodore (VE) | 59 | + 59.000 | 6 | 39 |
| 23 | 16 | (Australia) Tony Ricciardello | Kelly Racing | Holden Commodore (VE) | 58 | + 1 lap | 29 | 36 |
| 24 | 6 | (New Zealand) Steven Richards | Ford Performance Racing | Ford Falcon (FG) | 55 | + 4 laps | 16 | 33 |
| Ret | 22 | (Australia) Will Davison | Holden Racing Team | Holden Commodore (VE) | 54 | Engine | 24 | |
| Ret | 47 | (Australia) Tim Slade | James Rosenberg Racing | Ford Falcon (FG) | 42 | Retired | 25 | |
| Ret | 12 | (Australia) Dean Fiore | Triple F Racing | Ford Falcon (FG) | 13 | Retired | 23 | |
| Ret | 39 | (Australia) Russell Ingall | Paul Morris Motorsport | Holden Commodore (VE) | 11 | Engine | 20 | |
| Ret | 9 | (New Zealand) Shane van Gisbergen | Stone Brothers Racing | Ford Falcon (FG) | 0 | Accident | 21 | |
Fastest Lap: Jamie Whincup (Triple Eight Race Engineering) - 1:23.2780 on lap 51

=== Race 8 ===
==== Qualifying ====
| Pos | No | Name | Team | Vehicle | Time |
|---|---|---|---|---|---|
| 1 | 2 | (Australia) Garth Tander | Holden Racing Team | Holden Commodore (VE) | 1:23.0349 |
| 2 | 1 | (Australia) Jamie Whincup | Triple Eight Race Engineering | Holden Commodore (VE) | 1:23.1043 |
| 3 | 34 | (Australia) Michael Caruso | Garry Rogers Motorsport | Holden Commodore (VE) | 1:23.1966 |
| 4 | 15 | (Australia) Rick Kelly | Kelly Racing | Holden Commodore (VE) | 1:23.2514 |
| 4 | 888 | (Australia) Craig Lowndes | Triple Eight Race Engineering | Holden Commodore (VE) | 1:23.3056 |
| 5 | 18 | (Australia) James Courtney | Dick Johnson Racing | Ford Falcon (FG) | 1:23.3100 |
| 6 | 17 | (Australia) Steven Johnson | Dick Johnson Racing | Ford Falcon (FG) | 1:23.3937 |
| 7 | 22 | (Australia) Will Davison | Holden Racing Team | Holden Commodore (VE) | 1:23.4094 |
| 8 | 7 | (Australia) Todd Kelly | Kelly Racing | Holden Commodore (VE) | 1:23.4097 |
| 9 | 5 | (Australia) Mark Winterbottom | Ford Performance Racing | Ford Falcon (FG) | 1:23.4398 |
| 10 | 33 | (Australia) Lee Holdsworth | Garry Rogers Motorsport | Holden Commodore (VE) | 1:23.4871 |
| 11 | 9 | (New Zealand) Shane van Gisbergen | Stone Brothers Racing | Ford Falcon (FG) | 1:23.5292 |
| 12 | 55 | (Australia) Paul Dumbrell | Rod Nash Racing | Ford Falcon (FG) | 1:23.5871 |
| 13 | 14 | (Australia) Jason Bright | Brad Jones Racing | Holden Commodore (VE) | 1:23.5887 |
| 15 | 19 | (Australia) Jonathon Webb | Tekno Autosports | Ford Falcon (FG) | 1:23.6231 |
| 16 | 10 | (Australia) Andrew Thompson | Walkinshaw Racing | Holden Commodore (VE) | 1:23.7785 |
| 17 | 3 | (Australia) Tony D'Alberto | Tony D'Alberto Racing | Holden Commodore (VE) | 1:23.8399 |
| 18 | 51 | (New Zealand) Greg Murphy | Paul Morris Motorsport | Holden Commodore (VE) | 1:23.8624 |
| 19 | 24 | (New Zealand) Fabian Coulthard | Walkinshaw Racing | Holden Commodore (VE) | 1:23.8995 |
| 20 | 4 | (Australia) Alex Davison | Stone Brothers Racing | Ford Falcon (FG) | 1:23.9106 |
| 21 | 47 | (Australia) Tim Slade | James Rosenberg Racing | Ford Falcon (FG) | 1:23.9755 |
| 22 | 39 | (Australia) Russell Ingall | Paul Morris Motorsport | Holden Commodore (VE) | 1:24.0136 |
| 23 | 11 | (Australia) Jason Bargwanna | Kelly Racing | Holden Commodore (VE) | 1:24.1023 |
| 24 | 12 | (Australia) Dean Fiore | Triple F Racing | Ford Falcon (FG) | 1:24.1339 |
| 25 | 6 | (New Zealand) Steven Richards | Ford Performance Racing | Ford Falcon (FG) | 1:24.2578 |
| 26 | 8 | (New Zealand) Jason Richards | Brad Jones Racing | Holden Commodore (VE) | 1:24.2783 |
| 27 | 16 | (Australia) Tony Ricciardello | Kelly Racing | Holden Commodore (VE) | 1:24.7054 |
| 28 | 21 | (Australia) Karl Reindler | Britek Motorsport | Holden Commodore (VE) | 1:24.7431 |
| 27 | 30 | (New Zealand) Daniel Gaunt | Lucas Dumbrell Motorsport | Holden Commodore (VE) | 1:25.0753 |

==== Race ====
| Pos | No | Name | Team | Vehicle | Laps | Time/Retired | Grid | Points |
|---|---|---|---|---|---|---|---|---|
| 1 | 1 | (Australia) Jamie Whincup | Triple Eight Race Engineering | Holden Commodore (VE) | 59 | 1:27:53.1931 | 2 | 150 |
| 2 | 2 | (Australia) Garth Tander | Holden Racing Team | Holden Commodore (VE) | 59 | +6.2s | 1 | 138 |
| 3 | 34 | (Australia) Michael Caruso | Garry Rogers Motorsport | Holden Commodore (VE) | 59 | +19.6s | 3 | 129 |
| 4 | 33 | (Australia) Lee Holdsworth | Garry Rogers Motorsport | Holden Commodore (VE) | 59 | +22.9s | 11 | 120 |
| 5 | 22 | (Australia) Will Davison | Holden Racing Team | Holden Commodore (VE) | 59 | +32.1s | 8 | 111 |
| 6 | 15 | (Australia) Rick Kelly | Kelly Racing | Holden Commodore (VE) | 59 | +40.0s | 4 | 102 |
| 7 | 9 | (New Zealand) Shane van Gisbergen | Stone Brothers Racing | Ford Falcon (FG) | 59 | +47.3s | 12 | 96 |
| 8 | 7 | (Australia) Todd Kelly | Kelly Racing | Holden Commodore (VE) | 59 | +48.0s | 9 | 90 |
| 9 | 11 | (Australia) Jason Bargwanna | Kelly Racing | Holden Commodore (VE) | 59 | +49.7s | 23 | 84 |
| 10 | 19 | (Australia) Jonathon Webb | Tekno Autosports | Ford Falcon (FG) | 59 | +50.0s | 15 | 78 |
| 11 | 8 | (New Zealand) Jason Richards | Brad Jones Racing | Holden Commodore (VE) | 59 | +52.9s | 26 | 72 |
| 12 | 39 | (Australia) Russell Ingall | Paul Morris Motorsport | Holden Commodore (VE) | 59 | +54.7s | 22 | 69 |
| 13 | 14 | (Australia) Jason Bright | Brad Jones Racing | Holden Commodore (VE) | 59 | +1:11.1s | 14 | 66 |
| 14 | 12 | (Australia) Dean Fiore | Triple F Racing | Ford Falcon (FG) | 59 | +1:12.4s | 24 | 63 |
| 15 | 51 | (New Zealand) Greg Murphy | Paul Morris Motorsport | Holden Commodore (VE) | 59 | +1:14.8s | 18 | 60 |
| 16 | 47 | (Australia) Tim Slade | James Rosenberg Racing | Ford Falcon (FG) | 58 | + 1 lap | 21 | 57 |
| 17 | 30 | (New Zealand) Daniel Gaunt | Lucas Dumbrell Motorsport | Holden Commodore (VE) | 58 | + 1 lap | 28 | 54 |
| 18 | 21 | (Australia) Karl Reindler | Britek Motorsport | Holden Commodore (VE) | 57 | + 2 laps | 27 | 51 |
| 19 | 888 | (Australia) Craig Lowndes | Triple Eight Race Engineering | Holden Commodore (VE) | 55 | + 4 laps | 5 | 48 |
| 20 | 55 | (Australia) Paul Dumbrell | Rod Nash Racing | Ford Falcon (FG) | 52 | + 7 laps | 13 | 45 |
| 21 | 18 | (Australia) James Courtney | Dick Johnson Racing | Ford Falcon (FG) | 48 | + 11 laps | 6 | 42 |
| Ret | 24 | (New Zealand) Fabian Coulthard | Walkinshaw Racing | Holden Commodore (VE) | 39 | Retired | 19 | |
| Ret | 4 | (Australia) Alex Davison | Stone Brothers Racing | Ford Falcon (FG) | 10 | Retired | 20 | |
| Ret | 3 | (Australia) Tony D'Alberto | Tony D'Alberto Racing | Holden Commodore (VE) | 9 | Retired | 17 | |
| Ret | 16 | (Australia) Tony Ricciardello | Kelly Racing | Holden Commodore (VE) | 1 | Retired | 26 | |
| EXC | 17 | (Australia) Steven Johnson | Dick Johnson Racing | Ford Falcon (FG) | | Disqualified | 7 | |
| EXC | 5 | (Australia) Mark Winterbottom | Ford Performance Racing | Ford Falcon (FG) | | Disqualified | 10 | |
| EXC | 6 | (New Zealand) Steven Richards | Ford Performance Racing | Ford Falcon (FG) | | Disqualified | 25 | |
| DNS | 10 | (Australia) Andrew Thompson | Walkinshaw Racing | Holden Commodore (VE) | | Did not start | | |
Fastest Lap: Jamie Whincup (Triple Eight Race Engineering) - 1:23.4397 on lap 42

== Standings ==
After race 8 of 26

| Pos | No. | Name | Team | Points |
|---|---|---|---|---|
| 1 | 1 | (Australia) Jamie Whincup | Triple Eight Race Engineering | 1071 |
| 2 | 18 | (Australia) James Courtney | Dick Johnson Racing | 867 |
| 3 | 5 | (Australia) Mark Winterbottom | Ford Performance Racing | 810 |
| 4 | 33 | (Australia) Lee Holdsworth | Garry Rogers Motorsport | 771 |
| 5 | 9 | (New Zealand) Shane van Gisbergen | Stone Brothers Racing | 726 |
