= 2004 Konica Minolta V8 Supercar Series =

Motor racing competition

The 2004 Konica Minolta V8 Supercar Series was an Australian touring car series held for V8 Supercars. It was the fifth series held for second tier V8 Supercars. The season began on 22 February 2004 at Wakefield Park and finished on 22 August at Mallala Motor Sport Park. The season consisted of six rounds held across four different states, returning to Queensland for the first time since 2001.

The tightest series in the history of the second-tier V8 Supercar competition saw the point score tied at the end of the final race. Brad Jones Racing Ford driver, Andrew Jones was adjudged the series champion on a countback as he won Winton Motor Raceway and Eastern Creek Raceway rounds whereas rival Supercheap Auto Racing Ford driver Luke Youlden did not have a round win to his credit. The pointscore underlined the necessity of consistency in race results, Dick Johnson Racing Ford driver Owen Kelly took the most race wins for the season, seven in total, but did not figure in the final points, losing too many through poor results. Jones had two wins, Youlden just one. The remaining wins were scattered between Alan Gurr, Mal Rose, Lee Holdsworth, Kurt Wimmer and Wayne Wakefield, most of those through the benefit of reverse grid races with Greg Ritter taking two wins and the final round in a guest drive of the Speed FX Racing Falcon Brad Tilley had driven all season. New Zealander Mark Porter had his best series result (and also the best Holden), finishing third, 68 points behind the top two after taking one second and a pair of third during the season. José Fernández finished fourth in the series despite never finishing higher than fourth in a race.

== Teams and drivers ==
The following teams and drivers have competed during the 2004 Konica Minolta V8 Supercar Series.

Team	Car	No.	Driver	Rounds
Brad Jones Racing	Ford AU Falcon	19	(Australia) Andrew Jones	All
Howard Racing	Ford AU Falcon	27	(Australia) Cameron McLean	All
Howard Racing	Ford AU Falcon	37	(Australia) Mark Howard	All
Howard Racing	Ford AU Falcon	38	(Australia) Aaron McGill	5
Howard Racing	Ford AU Falcon	38	(Australia) Adam Wallis	6
Howard Racing	Ford AU Falcon	83	(Australia) Tim Gordon	2, 5
Howard Racing	Ford AU Falcon	83	(Australia) Aaron McGill	4, 6
Matthew White Racing	Ford AU Falcon	28	(Australia) Matthew White	All
Matthew White Racing	Holden VX Commodore	76	(Australia) Dean Wanless	All
Steven Ellery Racing	Ford AU Falcon	30	(Australia) Luke Youlden	All
Jay Motorsport	Holden VX Commodore	32	(Australia) Jay Verdnik	All
Peters Motorsport	Ford AU Falcon	40	(Australia) Brett Peters	1
Peters Motorsport	Ford AU Falcon	40	(Australia) Wayne Wakefield	2–6
Peters Motorsport	Ford AU Falcon	80	(Australia) Michael Olsen	1, 3–4
Peters Motorsport	Ford AU Falcon	80	(Australia) Stephen Voight	5
Peters Motorsport	Ford AU Falcon	91	(Australia) Gary Deane	3–6
Holden Young Lions	Holden VX Commodore	46	(Australia) Michael Caruso	1–2
Holden Young Lions	Holden VX Commodore	46	(Australia) Steve Owen	3
Holden Young Lions	Holden VX Commodore	46	(Australia) Alan Gurr	4–6
Holden Young Lions	Holden VX Commodore	96	(Australia) Kurt Wimmer	All
Rupprecht Motorsport	Ford AU Falcon	55	(Australia) Mal Rose	1, 4
Rupprecht Motorsport	Ford AU Falcon	55	(Australia) Ross Halliday	2
Rupprecht Motorsport	Ford AU Falcon	55	(Australia) Stephen White	3
Rupprecht Motorsport	Ford AU Falcon	89	(Australia) Adam Wallis	1–5
Rupprecht Motorsport	Ford AU Falcon	90	(Australia) Phillip Scifleet	1–4
Rupprecht Motorsport	Ford AU Falcon	90	(Australia) Greg Crick	5
Paul Cruickshank Racing	Ford AU Falcon	56	(Australia) Kevin Mundy	All
Paul Cruickshank Racing	Ford AU Falcon	65	(Australia) Marcus Zukanovic	All
Speed FX Racing	Ford AU Falcon	60	(Australia) Brad Tilley	1–5
Speed FX Racing	Ford AU Falcon	60	(Australia) Greg Ritter	6
Independent Race Cars Australia	Holden VX Commodore	64	(Australia) Tony D'Alberto	All
Rod Lynch Racing	Ford AU Falcon	66	(Australia) Gary MacDonald	All
Shane Beikoff Racing	Ford AU Falcon	68	(Australia) Shane Beikoff	1, 3
Shane Beikoff Racing	Ford AU Falcon	68	(Australia) Phill Foster	2
Shane Beikoff Racing	Ford AU Falcon	68	(Malaysia) Alex Yoong	4–5
CarTrek Racing	Holden VX Commodore	69	(Australia) Robert Jones	3–6
Robert Smith Racing	Holden VX Commodore	70	(Australia) Alan Gurr	1–2
Robert Smith Racing	Holden VX Commodore	72	(Australia) Lee Holdsworth	All
Perkins Engineering	Holden VX Commodore	70	(Australia) Alex Davison	6
Dick Johnson Racing	Ford AU Falcon	71	(Australia) Owen Kelly	All
Dick Johnson Racing	Ford AU Falcon	81	(Australia) José Fernández	All
Sydney Star Racing	Holden VX Commodore	98	(Australia) Grant Elliott	All
Chance of a Lifetime	Ford AU Falcon	110	(Australia) Jamie Cartwright	1–5
MSport	Holden VX Commodore	111	(New Zealand) Mark Porter	All
A.N.T. Racing	Ford AU Falcon	300	(Australia) Tony Evangelou	2–6

== Race calendar ==
Round	Date	Circuit	Location	Winning driver
1	22–23 February	(New South Wales) Wakefield Park	Goulburn, New South Wales	(Australia) Alan Gurr
2	19–20 March	(South Australia) Adelaide Street Circuit	Adelaide, South Australia	(Australia) Owen Kelly
3	17–18 April	(Victoria (state)) Winton Motor Raceway	Benalla, Victoria	(Australia) Andrew Jones
4	29–30 May	(New South Wales) Eastern Creek Raceway	Sydney, New South Wales	(Australia) Andrew Jones
5	3–4 July	Queensland Raceway	Ipswich, Queensland	(Australia) Owen Kelly
6	21–22 August	(South Australia) Mallala Motor Sport Park	Mallala, South Australia	(Australia) Greg Ritter

== Results and standings ==
The season consisted of six rounds across three different states. Rounds 1 and 3–6 consisted of three races. The second race of each weekend saw the finishing order of race 1 reversed to form the grid, a 'reverse grid' race. Round 2 consisted of a pair of races. Points were awarded for all cars who finished each race in finishing order. Points may have been offered beyond the 30th position but at no point during the season did more than 30 cars finish a race. Round 2's pair of races carried 50% more points than a single race elsewhere in the season.

Position	1st	2nd	3rd	4th	5th	6th	7th	8th	9th	10th	11th	12th	13th	14th	15th	16th	17th	18th	19th	20th	21st	22nd	23rd	24th	25th	26th	27th	28th	29th	30th
Rounds 1 & 3–6 Points	64	62	60	58	56	54	52	50	48	46	44	42	40	38	36	34	32	30	28	26	24	22	20	18	16	14	12	10	8	6
Round 2 Points	96	93	90	87	84	81	78	75	72	69	66	63	60	57	54	51	48	45	42	39	36	33	30	27	24	21	18	15	12	9

=== Drivers championship ===
Points table referenced, in part, as follows:

Pos.	Driver	No.	WAK (New South Wales)			ADE (South Australia)		WIN (Victoria (state))			EAS (New South Wales)			QLD (Queensland)			MAL (South Australia)			Pen.	Points
1	(Australia) Andrew Jones	19	4	Ret	1	2	Ret	1	7	3	2	2	2	2	3	2	2	3	2	0	945
2	(Australia) Luke Youlden	30	6	3	7	5	6	2	16	1	4	7	3	6	Ret	5	3	6	3	0	945
3	(New Zealand) Mark Porter	111	7	4	19	7	4	3	3	Ret	11	15	8	5	6	6	10	2	7	0	877
4	(Australia) José Fernández	81	5	7	20	8	5	10	11	4	6	22	7	7	8	21	6	8	4	0	857
5	(Australia) Owen Kelly	71	Ret	5	22	1	1	7	1	Ret	1	5	1	1	4	1	24	20	18	0	830
6	(Australia) Matthew White	28	2	15	2	3	2	4	Ret	5	3	23	Ret	4	9	4	5	25	6	0	827
7	(Australia) Cameron McLean	27	3	16	3	4	3	6	20	2	7	20	4	Ret	12	19	13	14	Ret	32	725
8	(Australia) Tony D'Alberto	64	9	9	8	Ret	13	27	Ret	9	8	6	6	10	5	8	12	10	8	0	714
9	(Australia) Grant Elliott	98	11	12	DNS	12	10	13	10	6	25	3	12	11	14	12	14	23	9	0	706
10	(Australia) Gary MacDonald	66	21	21	11	13	11	14	15	14	12	14	Ret	12	17	9	15	7	13	0	660
11	(Australia) Marcus Zukanovic	65	16	20	9	10	Ret	17	4	8	9	Ret	11	9	11	16	4	15	Ret	0	629
12	(Australia) Wayne Wakefield	40				6	21	5	6	21	10	13	Ret	22	2	17	22	1	20	0	565
13	(Australia) Lee Holdsworth	72	12	13	6	Ret	DNS	28	Ret	10	30	1	Ret	3	7	3	8	11	17	0	560
14	(Australia) Alan Gurr	70/46	1	11	4	Ret	DNS				5	11	5	8	13	Ret	9	12	5	0	558
15	(Australia) Kevin Mundy	56	10	23	17	Ret	Ret	12	21	12	13	12	23	23	15	11	11	13	10	0	538
16	(Australia) Adam Wallis	89/38	15	6	15	15	12	16	8	13	21	Ret	DNS	17	18	15	16	Ret	DNS	0	523
17	(Australia) Kurt Wimmer	96	18	8	DNS	Ret	DNS	9	Ret	11	28	Ret	9	24	1	7	17	4	11	0	498
18	(Australia) Jay Verdnik	32	17	14	15	14	18	20	9	Ret	20	18	DNS	26	20	14	Ret	16	19	0	478
19	(Australia) Tony Evangelou	300				9	7	8	Ret	20	19	Ret	10	13	21	10	18	19	Ret	0	468
20	(Australia) Mark Howard	37	24	10	18	20	14	24	13	18	26	16	21	DNS	DNS	DNS	25	17	16	0	432
21	(Australia) Robert Jones	69						15	5	7	14	Ret	17	15	16	22	20	18	15	0	398
22	(Australia) Dean Wanless	76	23	Ret	12	Ret	17	26	17	15	24	8	14	27	Ret	DNS	21	22	14	0	394
23	(Australia) Brad Tilley	60	22	19	23	Ret	16	23	19	Ret	17	4	13	20	19	13				0	393
24	(Australia) Phillip Scifleet	90	8	Ret	5	21	8	11	Ret	DNS	16	10	16							0	375
25	(Australia) Jamie Cartwright	110	DNS	DNS	DNS	18	20	22	22	16	23	21	18	21	25	Ret				0	276
26	(Australia) Michael Caruso	46	25	2	13	11	9													0	256
27	(Australia) Aaron McGill	83/38									22	9	19	16	24	Ret	19	21	12	0	244
28	(Australia) Gary Deane	91						25	18	19	27	24	22	18	26	23	23	24	Ret	0	228
29	(Australia) Mal Rose	55	20	1	16						18	19	15							0	218
30	(Australia) Michael Olsen	80	14	17	Ret			19	12	Ret	29	17	14							0	206
31	(Australia) Greg Ritter	60															1	5	1	0	184
32	(Australia) Shane Beikoff	68	19	22	21			21	14	17										0	168
33	(Australia) Tim Gordon	83				19	15							Ret	22	20				0	144
34	(Malaysia) Alex Yoong	68									15	Ret	DNS	25	10	18				0	128
35	(Australia) Brett Peters	40	13	18	14															0	108
36	(Australia) Alex Davison	70															7	9	Ret	0	100
37	(Australia) Phill Foster	68				17	19													0	90
38	(Australia) Steve Owen	46						Ret	2	Ret										0	62
39	(Australia) Greg Crick	90												14	23	DNS				0	58
40	(Australia) Ross Halliday	55				16	Ret													0	51
41	(Australia) Stephen Voight	80												19	27	Ret				0	40
42	(Australia) Stephen White	55						18	Ret	DNS										0	30
Pos.	Driver	No.	WAK (New South Wales)			ADE (South Australia)		WIN (Victoria (state))			EAS (New South Wales)			QLD (Queensland)			MAL (South Australia)			Pen.	Points

Colour	Result
Gold	Winner
Silver	Second place
Bronze	Third place
Green	Points classification
Blue	Non-points classification
Blue	Non-classified finish (NC)
Purple	Retired, not classified (Ret)
Red	Did not qualify (DNQ)
Red	Did not pre-qualify (DNPQ)
Black	Disqualified (DSQ)
White	Did not start (DNS)
White	Withdrew (WD)
White	Race cancelled (C)
Blank	Did not practice (DNP)
Blank	Did not arrive (DNA)
Blank	Excluded (EX)

== See also ==
- 2004 V8 Supercar season
