= 2019 Auckland SuperSprint =

Motor racing event in New Zealand

(New Zealand) 2019 ITM Auckland SuperSprint
Event Information
- Round 11 of 15 in the 2019 Supercars Championship
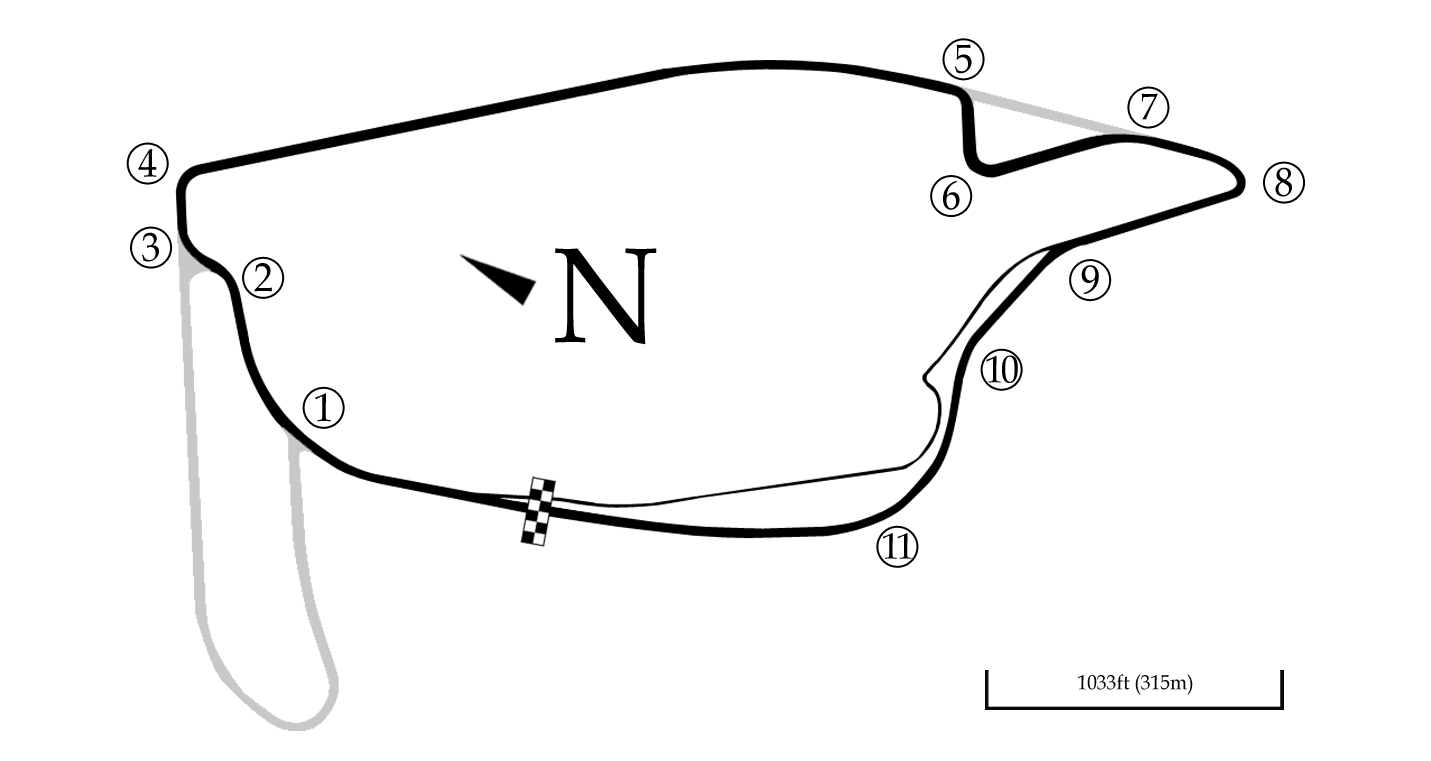
- Date: 13-15 September 2019
- Location: Pukekohe, New Zealand
- Venue: Pukekohe Park Raceway

Results
Race 1
Distance	70 laps	200 km
Pole position	Shane van Gisbergen; Triple Eight Race Engineering	1:01.5480
Winner	Shane van Gisbergen; Triple Eight Race Engineering	1:19:07.6388
Race 2
Distance	70 laps	200 km
Pole position	Jamie Whincup; Triple Eight Race Engineering	1:01.6666
Winner	Scott McLaughlin; DJR Team Penske	1:17:38.7925

The 2019 ITM Auckland SuperSprint was a motor racing event for Supercars, held on the weekend of 13 to 15 September 2019. The event was held at Pukekohe Park Raceway near Pukekohe, New Zealand, and consisted of two races, 200 kilometres in length. It was the 11th event of fifteen in the 2019 Supercars Championship and hosted races 23 and 24 of the season. It was the fourteenth running of the Auckland SuperSprint.

== Report ==
=== Practice ===
The first practice session started in wet conditions, eventually drying as the session went on. Richie Stanaway strayed wide at the final corner, swiping the wall and causing damage to his left-rear suspension which forced him out of the rest of the session. With the track continually improving toward the end of the session, Will Davison seized the advantage and came away as the fastest driver.

The remaining two sessions were claimed by stablemates, Lee Holdsworth and Chaz Mostert, to complete a Tickford Racing sweep of practice.

Practice summary
Session	Day	Fastest lap				
Session	Day	No.	Driver	Team	Car	Time
P1	Friday	23	(Australia) Will Davison	23Red Racing	Ford Mustang (S550)	1:02.4451
P2	Friday	5	(Australia) Lee Holdsworth	Tickford Racing	Ford Mustang (S550)	1:01.6281
P3	Saturday	55	(Australia) Chaz Mostert	Tickford Racing	Ford Mustang (S550)	1:01.8983

=== Race 23 ===
==== Qualifying ====
Hometown hero, Shane van Gisbergen, took pole position for the first race of the weekend, not long after spinning off at turn three in the final practice session. This marked his first pole position since Tasmania in April.

Pos	No	Driver	Team	Vehicle	Time
1	97	(New Zealand) Shane van Gisbergen	Triple Eight Race Engineering	Holden Commodore (ZB)	1:01.5480
2	6	(Australia) Cam Waters	Tickford Racing	Ford Mustang (S550)	1:01.6986
3	23	(Australia) Will Davison	23Red Racing	Ford Mustang (S550)	1:01.7513
4	55	(Australia) Chaz Mostert	Tickford Racing	Ford Mustang (S550)	1:01.7804
5	12	(New Zealand) Fabian Coulthard	DJR Team Penske	Ford Mustang (S550)	1:01.8018
6	17	(New Zealand) Scott McLaughlin	DJR Team Penske	Ford Mustang (S550)	1:01.8461
7	9	(Australia) David Reynolds	Erebus Motorsport	Holden Commodore (ZB)	1:01.9151
8	5	(Australia) Lee Holdsworth	Tickford Racing	Ford Mustang (S550)	1:01.9338
9	99	(Australia) Anton de Pasquale	Erebus Motorsport	Holden Commodore (ZB)	1:02.0445
10	8	(Australia) Nick Percat	Brad Jones Racing	Holden Commodore (ZB)	1:02.0786
11	2	(Australia) Scott Pye	Walkinshaw Andretti United	Holden Commodore (ZB)	1:02.1043
12	88	(Australia) Jamie Whincup	Triple Eight Race Engineering	Holden Commodore (ZB)	1:02.1251
13	14	(Australia) Tim Slade	Brad Jones Racing	Holden Commodore (ZB)	1:02.1477
14	33	(New Zealand) Richie Stanaway	Garry Rogers Motorsport	Holden Commodore (ZB)	1:02.1694
15	18	(Australia) Mark Winterbottom	Team 18	Holden Commodore (ZB)	1:02.1829
16	7	(New Zealand) Andre Heimgartner	Kelly Racing	Nissan Altima (L33)	1:02.2470
17	3	(Australia) Garry Jacobson	Kelly Racing	Nissan Altima (L33)	1:02.2680
18	34	(Australia) James Golding	Garry Rogers Motorsport	Holden Commodore (ZB)	1:02.2712
19	22	(Australia) James Courtney	Walkinshaw Andretti United	Holden Commodore (ZB)	1:02.3129
20	35	(Australia) Todd Hazelwood	Matt Stone Racing	Holden Commodore (ZB)	1:02.3532
21	21	(Australia) Macauley Jones	Tim Blanchard Racing	Holden Commodore (ZB)	1:02.3648
22	15	(Australia) Rick Kelly	Kelly Racing	Nissan Altima (L33)	1:02.4633
23	78	(Switzerland) Simona de Silvestro	Kelly Racing	Nissan Altima (L33)	1:02.6325
24	19	(Australia) Jack Le Brocq	Tekno Autosports	Holden Commodore (ZB)	1:03.1087

==== Race ====
Pos.	No.	Name	Team	Laps	Time	Grid
1	97	(New Zealand) Shane van Gisbergen	Triple Eight Race Engineering	70	1hr 19min 07.6388sec	1
2	6	(Australia) Cam Waters	Tickford Racing	70	+ 12.649	2
3	9	(Australia) David Reynolds	Erebus Motorsport	70	+ 15.428	7
4	17	(New Zealand) Scott McLaughlin	DJR Team Penske	70	+ 16.089	6
5	5	(Australia) Lee Holdsworth	Tickford Racing	70	+ 16.892	8
6	88	(Australia) Jamie Whincup	Triple Eight Race Engineering	70	+ 17.363	12
7	12	(New Zealand) Fabian Coulthard	DJR Team Penske	70	+ 21.383	5
8	7	(New Zealand) Andre Heimgartner	Kelly Racing	70	+ 21.996	16
9	23	(Australia) Will Davison	23Red Racing	70	+ 24.822	3
10	33	(New Zealand) Richie Stanaway	Garry Rogers Motorsport	70	+ 25.927	14
11	14	(Australia) Tim Slade	Brad Jones Racing	70	+ 26.661	13
12	8	(Australia) Nick Percat	Brad Jones Racing	70	+ 31.849	10
13	2	(Australia) Scott Pye	Walkinshaw Andretti United	70	+ 32.280	11
14	35	(Australia) Todd Hazelwood	Matt Stone Racing	70	+ 37.850	20
15	99	(Australia) Anton de Pasquale	Erebus Motorsport	70	+ 38.320	9
16	78	(Switzerland) Simona de Silvestro	Kelly Racing	70	+ 38.586	23
17	22	(Australia) James Courtney	Walkinshaw Andretti United	70	+ 39.985	19
18	3	(Australia) Garry Jacobson	Kelly Racing	70	+ 42.179	17
19	15	(Australia) Rick Kelly	Kelly Racing	70	+ 47.031	22
20	21	(Australia) Macauley Jones	Tim Blanchard Racing	70	+ 57.902	21
21	19	(Australia) Jack Le Brocq	Tekno Autosports	69	+ 1 lap	24
22	18	(Australia) Mark Winterbottom	Team 18	65	+ 5 laps	15
23	34	(Australia) James Golding	Garry Rogers Motorsport	60	+ 10 laps	18
24	55	(Australia) Chaz Mostert	Tickford Racing	56	+ 14 laps	4
Fastest lap: Jamie Whincup (Triple Eight Race Engineering), 1:02.5421

=== Race 24 ===
==== Qualifying ====
Pos	No	Driver	Team	Vehicle	Time
1	88	(Australia) Jamie Whincup	Triple Eight Race Engineering	Holden Commodore (ZB)	1:01.5620
2	23	(Australia) Will Davison	23Red Racing	Ford Mustang (S550)	1:01.5909
3	55	(Australia) Chaz Mostert	Tickford Racing	Ford Mustang (S550)	1:01.6314
4	97	(New Zealand) Shane van Gisbergen	Triple Eight Race Engineering	Holden Commodore (ZB)	1:01.6593
5	5	(Australia) Lee Holdsworth	Tickford Racing	Ford Mustang (S550)	1:01.7362
6	17	(New Zealand) Scott McLaughlin	DJR Team Penske	Ford Mustang (S550)	1:01.7414
7	8	(Australia) Nick Percat	Brad Jones Racing	Holden Commodore (ZB)	1:01.7916
8	12	(New Zealand) Fabian Coulthard	DJR Team Penske	Ford Mustang (S550)	1:01.8654
9	18	(Australia) Mark Winterbottom	Team 18	Holden Commodore (ZB)	1:01.8762
10	6	(Australia) Cam Waters	Tickford Racing	Ford Mustang (S550)	1:01.9078
11	35	(Australia) Todd Hazelwood	Matt Stone Racing	Holden Commodore (ZB)	1:01.9210
12	14	(Australia) Tim Slade	Brad Jones Racing	Holden Commodore (ZB)	1:01.9465
13	7	(New Zealand) Andre Heimgartner	Kelly Racing	Nissan Altima (L33)	1:01.9697
14	99	(Australia) Anton de Pasquale	Erebus Motorsport	Holden Commodore (ZB)	1:02.0408
15	34	(Australia) James Golding	Garry Rogers Motorsport	Holden Commodore (ZB)	1:02.0437
16	33	(New Zealand) Richie Stanaway	Garry Rogers Motorsport	Holden Commodore (ZB)	1:02.0747
17	2	(Australia) Scott Pye	Walkinshaw Andretti United	Holden Commodore (ZB)	1:02.1329
18	22	(Australia) James Courtney	Walkinshaw Andretti United	Holden Commodore (ZB)	1:02.2171
19	21	(Australia) Macauley Jones	Tim Blanchard Racing	Holden Commodore (ZB)	1:02.3003
20	15	(Australia) Rick Kelly	Kelly Racing	Nissan Altima (L33)	1:02.3484
21	78	(Switzerland) Simona de Silvestro	Kelly Racing	Nissan Altima (L33)	1:02.4197
22	9	(Australia) David Reynolds	Erebus Motorsport	Holden Commodore (ZB)	1:02.4999
23	3	(Australia) Garry Jacobson	Kelly Racing	Nissan Altima (L33)	1:02.5196
24	19	(Australia) Jack Le Brocq	Tekno Autosports	Holden Commodore (ZB)	1:02.6650

==== Top Ten Shootout ====
Pos	No	Driver	Team	Vehicle	Time
1	88	(Australia) Jamie Whincup	Triple Eight Race Engineering	Holden Commodore (ZB)	1:01.6666
2	5	(Australia) Lee Holdsworth	Tickford Racing	Ford Mustang (S550)	1:01.8651
3	6	(Australia) Cam Waters	Tickford Racing	Ford Mustang (S550)	1:01.8781
4	12	(New Zealand) Fabian Coulthard	DJR Team Penske	Ford Mustang (S550)	1:01.8964
5	17	(New Zealand) Scott McLaughlin	DJR Team Penske	Ford Mustang (S550)	1:01.9165
6	97	(New Zealand) Shane van Gisbergen	Triple Eight Race Engineering	Holden Commodore (ZB)	1:01.9809
7	55	(Australia) Chaz Mostert	Tickford Racing	Ford Mustang (S550)	1:02.0236
8	23	(Australia) Will Davison	23Red Racing	Ford Mustang (S550)	1:02.1325
9	18	(Australia) Mark Winterbottom	Team 18	Holden Commodore (ZB)	1:02.3685
DSQ	8	(Australia) Nick Percat	Brad Jones Racing	Holden Commodore (ZB)	Disqualified

==== Race ====
Pos.	No.	Name	Team	Laps	Time	Grid
1	17	(New Zealand) Scott McLaughlin	DJR Team Penske	70	1hr 17min 38.7925sec	5
2	97	(New Zealand) Shane van Gisbergen	Triple Eight Race Engineering	70	+ 1.898	6
3	55	(Australia) Chaz Mostert	Tickford Racing	70	+ 6.043	7
4	8	(Australia) Nick Percat	Brad Jones Racing	70	+ 6.566	10
5	35	(Australia) Todd Hazelwood	Matt Stone Racing	70	+ 31.654	11
6	2	(Australia) Scott Pye	Walkinshaw Andretti United	70	+ 43.751	17
7	78	(Switzerland) Simona de Silvestro	Kelly Racing	70	+ 44.932	21
8	18	(Australia) Mark Winterbottom	Team 18	70	+ 47.365	9
9	33	(New Zealand) Richie Stanaway	Garry Rogers Motorsport	70	+ 50.136	16
10	34	(Australia) James Golding	Garry Rogers Motorsport	70	+ 50.952	15
11	15	(Australia) Rick Kelly	Kelly Racing	70	+ 53.074	20
12	12	(New Zealand) Fabian Coulthard	DJR Team Penske	70	+ 53.406	4
13	23	(Australia) Will Davison	23Red Racing	70	+ 53.864	8
14	6	(Australia) Cam Waters	Tickford Racing	70	+ 54.160	3
15	5	(Australia) Lee Holdsworth	Tickford Racing	70	+ 55.603	2
16	88	(Australia) Jamie Whincup	Triple Eight Race Engineering	70	+ 55.969	1
17	22	(Australia) James Courtney	Walkinshaw Andretti United	70	+ 58.178	18
18	14	(Australia) Tim Slade	Brad Jones Racing	70	+ 58.733	12
19	7	(New Zealand) Andre Heimgartner	Kelly Racing	70	+ 1:01.575	13
20	99	(Australia) Anton de Pasquale	Erebus Motorsport	69	+ 1 lap	14
21	3	(Australia) Garry Jacobson	Kelly Racing	69	+ 1 lap	23
22	21	(Australia) Macauley Jones	Tim Blanchard Racing	68	+ 2 laps	19
23	19	(Australia) Jack Le Brocq	Tekno Autosports	68	+ 2 laps	24
24	9	(Australia) David Reynolds	Erebus Motorsport	54	+ 14 laps	22
Fastest lap: Jamie Whincup (Triple Eight Race Engineering), 1:02.3719

== Aftermath ==
Once again, questions were posed regarding the future of the Supercars event at Pukekohe. In January 2020, it was announced that the New Zealand leg of the championship would shift from Pukekohe to Hampton Downs Motorsport Park. The reasoning given for the shift was as a result of legislation which prevents the Pukekohe circuit hosting racing on Anzac Day. However, the COVID-19 pandemic ground global motorsport to a halt and the round scheduled for 2020 would not go ahead. The championship would not return to New Zealand until 2022 where the series would complete one more round at Pukekohe before the tracks closure and demolition in 2023.

=== Championship standings ===
Drivers' Championship standings

	Pos.	Driver	Points
	1	(New Zealand) Scott McLaughlin	3008
2	2	(New Zealand) Shane van Gisbergen	2410
1	3	(Australia) Chaz Mostert	2327
1	4	(New Zealand) Fabian Coulthard	2317
	5	(Australia) Jamie Whincup	2140

Teams' Championship standings

Pos.	Constructor	Points
1	Dick Johnson Racing	5265
2	Triple Eight Race Engineering	4410
3	Tickford Racing 1	3981
4	Erebus Motorsport	3719
5	Tickford Racing 2	3706

- Note: Only the top five positions are included for both sets of standings.
