= 2019 Newcastle 500 =

Motor race for V8 Supercars

(New South Wales) 2019 Coates Hire Newcastle 500
Event Information
- Round 15 of 15 in the 2019 Supercars Championship
- Date: 22–24 November 2019
- Location: Newcastle East, New South Wales
- Venue: Newcastle Street Circuit
- Weather: Overcast, smoggy

Results
Race 1
Distance	95 laps	250.895 km
Pole position	(New Zealand) Shane van Gisbergen; Triple Eight Race Engineering	1:10.1747
Winner	(New Zealand) Shane van Gisbergen; Triple Eight Race Engineering	1:55:11.9747
Race 2
Distance	93 laps	245.613 km
Pole position	(Australia) Jamie Whincup; Triple Eight Race Engineering	1:10.5551
Winner	(Australia) Jamie Whincup; Triple Eight Race Engineering	1:57:09.2414

The 2019 Newcastle 500 (commercially titled 2019 Coates Hire Newcastle 500) was a motor racing event for the Supercars Championship, held on the weekend of 22 to 24 November 2019. The event was held on the Newcastle Street Circuit in Newcastle East, New South Wales and consisted of two races, scheduled to be 250 kilometres in length. It was the fifteenth and final event in the 2019 Supercars Championship and hosted Races 31 and 32 of the season.

== Background ==
Scott McLaughlin entered the event as champion-elect with a 550-point margin over compatriot Shane van Gisbergen.

Prior to the event, Supercars announced a review of its social media policies after a number of drivers criticised the legitimacy of McLaughlin's championship online – the season had been marred by a parity dispute over the new Ford Mustang S550, the alleged use of team orders by DJR Team Penske at the Bathurst 1000, and McLaughlin's delayed disqualification from the Top 10 Shootout at Bathurst due to an engine irregularity.

Due to the Black Summer bushfires, smoke affected the events weather conditions.

== Results ==
=== Practice ===
Practice summary
Session	Day	Fastest lap				
Session	Day	No.	Driver	Team	Car	Time
Practice 1	Friday	17	(New Zealand) Scott McLaughlin	DJR Team Penske	Ford Mustang S550	1:10.6092
Practice 2	Friday	88	(Australia) Jamie Whincup	Triple Eight Race Engineering	Holden Commodore ZB	1:10.3173

=== Race 31 ===
==== Qualifying ====
Pos.	No.	Name	Team	Car	Time/Gap
1	88	(Australia) Jamie Whincup	Triple Eight Race Engineering	Holden Commodore ZB	1:10.1823
2	99	(Australia) Anton de Pasquale	Erebus Motorsport	Holden Commodore ZB	+0.1270
3	6	(Australia) Cam Waters	Tickford Racing	Ford Mustang S550	+0.1737
4	12	(New Zealand) Fabian Coulthard	DJR Team Penske	Ford Mustang S550	+0.2007
5	5	(Australia) Lee Holdsworth	Tickford Racing	Ford Mustang S550	+0.2307
6	14	(Australia) Tim Slade	Brad Jones Racing	Holden Commodore ZB	+0.2649
7	22	(Australia) James Courtney	Walkinshaw Andretti United	Holden Commodore ZB	+0.2773
8	17	(New Zealand) Scott McLaughlin	DJR Team Penske	Ford Mustang S550	+0.2894
9	9	(Australia) David Reynolds	Erebus Motorsport	Holden Commodore ZB	+0.3146
10	97	(New Zealand) Shane van Gisbergen	Triple Eight Race Engineering	Holden Commodore ZB	+0.3519
11	18	(Australia) Mark Winterbottom	Team 18	Holden Commodore ZB	+0.3967
12	15	(Australia) Rick Kelly	Kelly Racing	Nissan Altima L33	+0.4143
13	35	(Australia) Todd Hazelwood	Matt Stone Racing	Holden Commodore ZB	+0.4339
14	8	(Australia) Nick Percat	Brad Jones Racing	Holden Commodore ZB	+0.4476
15	23	(Australia) Will Davison	23Red Racing	Ford Mustang S550	+0.4515
16	55	(Australia) Chaz Mostert	Tickford Racing	Ford Mustang S550	+0.4544
17	21	(Australia) Macauley Jones	Tim Blanchard Racing	Holden Commodore ZB	+0.4959
18	7	(New Zealand) Andre Heimgartner	Kelly Racing	Nissan Altima L33	+0.7197
19	19	(Australia) Jack Le Brocq	Tekno Autosports	Holden Commodore ZB	+0.7441
20	78	(Switzerland) Simona de Silvestro	Kelly Racing	Nissan Altima L33	+0.7989
21	3	(Australia) Garry Jacobson	Kelly Racing	Nissan Altima L33	+0.8719
22	33	(New Zealand) Richie Stanaway	Garry Rogers Motorsport	Holden Commodore ZB	+0.8793
23	34	(Australia) James Golding	Garry Rogers Motorsport	Holden Commodore ZB	+1.0356
24	2	(Australia) Scott Pye	Walkinshaw Andretti United	Holden Commodore ZB	+2.4401

==== Top 10 Shootout ====
Pos.	No.	Driver	Team	Car	Time	Gap
1	97	(New Zealand) Shane van Gisbergen	Triple Eight Race Engineering	Holden Commodore ZB	1:10.1747	
2	17	(New Zealand) Scott McLaughlin	DJR Team Penske	Ford Mustang S550	1:10.2374	+0.0627
3	88	(Australia) Jamie Whincup	Triple Eight Race Engineering	Holden Commodore ZB	1:10.2817	+0.1070
4	6	(Australia) Cam Waters	Tickford Racing	Ford Mustang S550	1:10.3294	+0.1547
5	99	(Australia) Anton de Pasquale	Erebus Motorsport	Holden Commodore ZB	1:10.3687	+0.1940
6	12	(New Zealand) Fabian Coulthard	DJR Team Penske	Ford Mustang S550	1:10.4593	+0.2846
7	9	(Australia) David Reynolds	Erebus Motorsport	Holden Commodore ZB	1:10.5481	+0.3734
8	22	(Australia) James Courtney	Walkinshaw Andretti United	Holden Commodore ZB	1:10.5553	+0.3806
9	14	(Australia) Tim Slade	Brad Jones Racing	Holden Commodore ZB	1:10.7821	+0.6074
10	5	(Australia) Lee Holdsworth	Tickford Racing	Ford Mustang S550	1:10.8043	+0.6296

==== Race ====
Pos	No.	Driver	Team	Car	Laps	Time/Retired	Grid	Points
1	97	(New Zealand) Shane van Gisbergen	Triple Eight Race Engineering	Holden Commodore ZB	95	1:55:11.9747	1	150
2	17	(New Zealand) Scott McLaughlin	DJR Team Penske	Ford Mustang S550	95	+10.55269	2	138
3	12	(New Zealand) Fabian Coulthard	DJR Team Penske	Ford Mustang S550	95	+12.8301	6	129
4	9	(Australia) David Reynolds	Erebus Motorsport	Holden Commodore ZB	95	+15.3240	7	120
5	6	(Australia) Cam Waters	Tickford Racing	Ford Mustang S550	95	+22.9578	4	111
6	2	(Australia) Scott Pye	Walkinshaw Andretti United	Holden Commodore ZB	95	+23.7177	24	102
7	22	(Australia) James Courtney	Walkinshaw Andretti United	Holden Commodore ZB	95	+29.6507	8	96
8	88	(Australia) Jamie Whincup	Triple Eight Race Engineering	Holden Commodore ZB	95	+29.9188	3	90
9	14	(Australia) Tim Slade	Brad Jones Racing	Holden Commodore ZB	95	+30.6526	9	84
10	18	(Australia) Mark Winterbottom	Team 18	Holden Commodore ZB	95	+35.3786	11	78
11	55	(Australia) Chaz Mostert	Tickford Racing	Ford Mustang S550	95	+41.4036	16	72
12	5	(Australia) Lee Holdsworth	Tickford Racing	Ford Mustang S550	95	+49.5492	10	69
13	15	(Australia) Rick Kelly	Kelly Racing	Nissan Altima L33	95	+58.5151	12	66
14	8	(Australia) Nick Percat	Brad Jones Racing	Holden Commodore ZB	95	+1:00.9419	14	63
15	23	(Australia) Will Davison	23Red Racing	Ford Mustang S550	95	+1:02.6162	15	60
16	33	(New Zealand) Richie Stanaway	Garry Rogers Motorsport	Holden Commodore ZB	95	+1:10.6392	22	57
17	21	(Australia) Macauley Jones	Tim Blanchard Racing	Holden Commodore ZB	95	+1:10.7527	17	54
18	35	(Australia) Todd Hazelwood	Matt Stone Racing	Holden Commodore ZB	94	+1 lap	13	51
19	78	(Switzerland) Simona de Silvestro	Kelly Racing	Nissan Altima L33	94	+1 lap	20	48
20	3	(Australia) Garry Jacobson	Kelly Racing	Nissan Altima L33	94	+1 lap	21	45
21	7	(New Zealand) Andre Heimgartner	Kelly Racing	Nissan Altima L33	94	+1 lap	18	42
22	34	(Australia) James Golding	Garry Rogers Motorsport	Holden Commodore ZB	94	+1 lap	23	39
23	99	(Australia) Anton de Pasquale	Erebus Motorsport	Holden Commodore ZB	91	+4 laps	5	36
DNF	19	(Australia) Jack Le Brocq	Tekno Autosports	Holden Commodore ZB	2	Crash damage	19	

=== Race 32 ===
==== Qualifying ====
Pos.	No.	Name	Team	Car	Time/Gap
1	6	(Australia) Cam Waters	Tickford Racing	Ford Mustang S550	1:10.1095
2	88	(Australia) Jamie Whincup	Triple Eight Race Engineering	Holden Commodore ZB	+0.0186
3	17	(New Zealand) Scott McLaughlin	DJR Team Penske	Ford Mustang S550	+0.0389
4	12	(New Zealand) Fabian Coulthard	DJR Team Penske	Ford Mustang S550	+0.2033
5	14	(Australia) Tim Slade	Brad Jones Racing	Holden Commodore ZB	+0.3012
6	99	(Australia) Anton de Pasquale	Erebus Motorsport	Holden Commodore ZB	+0.3213
7	22	(Australia) James Courtney	Walkinshaw Andretti United	Holden Commodore ZB	+0.3408
8	9	(Australia) David Reynolds	Erebus Motorsport	Holden Commodore ZB	+0.3427
9	2	(Australia) Scott Pye	Walkinshaw Andretti United	Holden Commodore ZB	+0.4267
10	5	(Australia) Lee Holdsworth	Tickford Racing	Ford Mustang S550	+0.4450
11	55	(Australia) Chaz Mostert	Tickford Racing	Ford Mustang S550	+0.4455
12	7	(New Zealand) Andre Heimgartner	Kelly Racing	Nissan Altima L33	+0.5003
13	35	(Australia) Todd Hazelwood	Matt Stone Racing	Holden Commodore ZB	+0.5032
14	15	(Australia) Rick Kelly	Kelly Racing	Nissan Altima L33	+0.5229
15	8	(Australia) Nick Percat	Brad Jones Racing	Holden Commodore ZB	+0.5636
16	21	(Australia) Macauley Jones	Tim Blanchard Racing	Holden Commodore ZB	+0.6276
17	23	(Australia) Will Davison	23Red Racing	Ford Mustang S550	+0.6329
18	97	(New Zealand) Shane van Gisbergen	Triple Eight Race Engineering	Holden Commodore ZB	+0.6531
19	34	(Australia) James Golding	Garry Rogers Motorsport	Holden Commodore ZB	+0.6550
20	18	(Australia) Mark Winterbottom	Team 18	Holden Commodore ZB	+0.6657
21	33	(New Zealand) Richie Stanaway	Garry Rogers Motorsport	Holden Commodore ZB	+0.8187
22	78	(Switzerland) Simona de Silvestro	Kelly Racing	Nissan Altima L33	+0.8325
23	19	(Australia) Jack Le Brocq	Tekno Autosports	Holden Commodore ZB	+0.8891
24	3	(Australia) Garry Jacobson	Kelly Racing	Nissan Altima L33	+1.1067

==== Top 10 Shootout ====
Pos.	No.	Driver	Team	Car	Time	Gap
1	88	(Australia) Jamie Whincup	Triple Eight Race Engineering	Holden Commodore ZB	1:10.5551	
2	6	(Australia) Cam Waters	Tickford Racing	Ford Mustang S550	1:10.7737	+0.2186
3	12	(New Zealand) Fabian Coulthard	DJR Team Penske	Ford Mustang S550	1:10.8432	+0.2881
4	17	(New Zealand) Scott McLaughlin	DJR Team Penske	Ford Mustang S550	1:10.8452	+0.2901
5	2	(Australia) Scott Pye	Walkinshaw Andretti United	Holden Commodore ZB	1:10.9907	+0.4356
6	99	(Australia) Anton de Pasquale	Erebus Motorsport	Holden Commodore ZB	1:11.0278	+0.4727
7	9	(Australia) David Reynolds	Erebus Motorsport	Holden Commodore ZB	1:11.0352	+0.4801
8	14	(Australia) Tim Slade	Brad Jones Racing	Holden Commodore ZB	1:11.2091	+0.6540
9	5	(Australia) Lee Holdsworth	Tickford Racing	Ford Mustang S550	1:11.4599	+0.9048
10	22	(Australia) James Courtney	Walkinshaw Andretti United	Holden Commodore ZB	1:11.6552	+1.1001

==== Race ====
Pos	No.	Driver	Team	Car	Laps	Time/Retired	Grid	Points
1	88	(Australia) Jamie Whincup	Triple Eight Race Engineering	Holden Commodore ZB	93	1:57:09.2414	1	150
2	12	(New Zealand) Fabian Coulthard	DJR Team Penske	Ford Mustang S550	93	+2.1246	3	138
3	14	(Australia) Tim Slade	Brad Jones Racing	Holden Commodore ZB	93	+3.8028	8	129
4	17	(New Zealand) Scott McLaughlin	DJR Team Penske	Ford Mustang S550	93	+5.2967	4	120
5	2	(Australia) Scott Pye	Walkinshaw Andretti United	Holden Commodore ZB	93	+6.2530	5	111
6	55	(Australia) Chaz Mostert	Tickford Racing	Ford Mustang S550	93	+11.6703	11	102
7	97	(New Zealand) Shane van Gisbergen	Triple Eight Race Engineering	Holden Commodore ZB	93	+18.6404	18	96
8	6	(Australia) Cam Waters	Tickford Racing	Ford Mustang S550	93	+19.3221	2	90
9	8	(Australia) Nick Percat	Brad Jones Racing	Holden Commodore ZB	93	+19.7458	15	84
10	35	(Australia) Todd Hazelwood	Matt Stone Racing	Holden Commodore ZB	93	+23.7303	13	78
11	22	(Australia) James Courtney	Walkinshaw Andretti United	Holden Commodore ZB	93	+24.6057	10	72
12	7	(New Zealand) Andre Heimgartner	Kelly Racing	Nissan Altima L33	93	+31.7828	12	69
13	23	(Australia) Will Davison	23Red Racing	Ford Mustang S550	93	+35.9773	17	66
14	18	(Australia) Mark Winterbottom	Team 18	Holden Commodore ZB	93	+38.7912	20	63
15	33	(New Zealand) Richie Stanaway	Garry Rogers Motorsport	Holden Commodore ZB	93	+40.8136	21	60
16	9	(Australia) David Reynolds	Erebus Motorsport	Holden Commodore ZB	93	+42.9704	7	57
17	19	(Australia) Jack Le Brocq	Tekno Autosports	Holden Commodore ZB	93	+50.6396	23	54
18	78	(Switzerland) Simona de Silvestro	Kelly Racing	Nissan Altima L33	93	+1:04.2108	22	51
19	15	(Australia) Rick Kelly	Kelly Racing	Nissan Altima L33	93	+1:09.6607	14	48
20	34	(Australia) James Golding	Garry Rogers Motorsport	Holden Commodore ZB	92	+1 lap	19	45
21	21	(Australia) Macauley Jones	Tim Blanchard Racing	Holden Commodore ZB	92	+1 lap	16	42
22	3	(Australia) Garry Jacobson	Kelly Racing	Nissan Altima L33	92	+1 lap	24	39
23	5	(Australia) Lee Holdsworth	Tickford Racing	Ford Mustang S550	83	+10 laps	9	36
DNF	99	(Australia) Anton de Pasquale	Erebus Motorsport	Holden Commodore ZB	22	Crash	6	33
