= 2019 Sandown 500 =

Signature event at Sandown Raceway

(Victoria (state)) 2019 Penrite Oil Sandown 500
Event Information
- Round 14 of 15 in the 2019 Supercars Championship
- Date: 8–10 November 2019
- Location: Melbourne, Victoria
- Venue: Sandown Raceway

Results
Race 1
Distance	161 laps	505.254 km
Pole position	(Australia) Jamie Whincup (Australia) Craig Lowndes; Triple Eight Race Engineering	
Winner	(Australia) Jamie Whincup (Australia) Craig Lowndes; Triple Eight Race Engineering	3:13:09.9976

The 2019 Sandown 500 (known for sponsorship purposes as the 2019 Penrite Oil Sandown 500) was a motor racing event for Supercars, held on the weekend of 8 to 10 November 2019. The event was held at Sandown Raceway in Melbourne, Victoria, Australia and consisted of one race, 500 kilometres in length. It was the fourteenth event of fifteen in the 2019 Supercars Championship and hosted Race 30 of the series. It was also the first event of the 2019 Pirtek Enduro Cup.

This running of Sandown 500 was run in November rather than the normal September timeslot. The race was won by Jamie Whincup and Craig Lowndes driving a Holden Commodore ZB.

== Results ==
=== Race ===
Pos.	No.	Driver	Team	Car	Laps	Time/Retired	Grid	Points
1	888	(Australia) Jamie Whincup (Australia) Craig Lowndes	Triple Eight Race Engineering	Holden Commodore ZB	161	3:13:09.9976	1	250
2	55	(Australia) Chaz Mostert (Australia) James Moffat	Tickford Racing	Ford Mustang GT	161	+20.5310	8	230
3	5	(Australia) Lee Holdsworth (Australia) Thomas Randle	Tickford Racing	Ford Mustang GT	161	+24.2552	6	215
4	12	(New Zealand) Fabian Coulthard (Australia) Tony D'Alberto	DJR Team Penske	Ford Mustang GT	161	+28.9357	5	200
5	2	(Australia) Scott Pye (Australia) Warren Luff	Walkinshaw Andretti United	Holden Commodore ZB	161	+40.0918	22	185
6	23	(Australia) Will Davison (Australia) Alex Davison	23Red Racing	Ford Mustang GT	161	+41.3411	4	170
7	22	(Australia) James Courtney (Australia) Jack Perkins	Walkinshaw Andretti United	Holden Commodore ZB	161	+42.7357	9	160
8	7	(New Zealand) Andre Heimgartner (Australia) Bryce Fullwood	Kelly Racing	Nissan Altima L33	161	+45.1415	2	150
9	17	(New Zealand) Scott McLaughlin (France) Alexandre Prémat	DJR Team Penske	Ford Mustang GT	161	+46.8964	25	140
10	99	(Australia) Anton De Pasquale (Australia) Will Brown	Erebus Motorsport	Holden Commodore ZB	161	+52.9118	12	130
11	8	(Australia) Nick Percat (Australia) Tim Blanchard	Brad Jones Racing	Holden Commodore ZB	160	+1 lap	17	120
12	18	(Australia) Mark Winterbottom (Australia) Steven Richards	Team 18	Holden Commodore ZB	160	+1 lap	14	115
13	14	(Australia) Tim Slade (Australia) Ashley Walsh	Brad Jones Racing	Holden Commodore ZB	160	+1 lap	19	110
14	33	(New Zealand) Richie Stanaway (New Zealand) Chris Pither	Garry Rogers Motorsport	Holden Commodore ZB	160	+1 lap	18	105
15	78	(Switzerland) Simona de Silvestro (Australia) Alex Rullo	Kelly Racing	Nissan Altima L33	160	+1 lap	11	100
16	56	(Australia) Brodie Kostecki (Australia) Jake Kostecki	Kostecki Brothers Racing	Holden Commodore ZB	160	+1 lap	26	95
17	97	(New Zealand) Shane van Gisbergen (Australia) Garth Tander	Triple Eight Race Engineering	Holden Commodore ZB	159	+2 laps	24	90
18	21	(Australia) Macauley Jones (Australia) Dean Canto	Tim Blanchard Racing	Holden Commodore ZB	159	+2 laps	20	85
19	19	(Australia) Jack Le Brocq (Australia) Jonathon Webb	Tekno Autosports	Holden Commodore ZB	159	+2 laps	20	80
20	35	(Australia) Todd Hazelwood (Australia) Jack Smith	Matt Stone Racing	Holden Commodore ZB	148	+13 laps	10	75
21	6	(Australia) Cam Waters (Australia) Michael Caruso	Tickford Racing	Ford Mustang GT	145	+16 laps	13	70
22	12	(Australia) Rick Kelly (Australia) Dale Wood	Kelly Racing	Nissan Altima L33	128	+17 laps	16	65
NC	34	(Australia) James Golding (Australia) Richard Muscat	Garry Rogers Motorsport	Nissan Altima L33	155	Retirement	21	0
NC	3	(Australia) Garry Jacobson (Australia) Dean Fiore	Kelly Racing	Nissan Altima L33	144	Retirement	25	0
NC	9	(Australia) David Reynolds (Australia) Luke Youlden	Erebus Motorsport	Holden Commodore ZB	30	Retirement	3	0
