= 2019 Phillip Island SuperSprint =

2019 V8 Supercar championship race

(Victoria (state)) 2019 WD-40 Phillip Island SuperSprint
Event Information
- Round 4 of 15 in the 2019 Supercars Championship
- Date: 12-14 April 2019
- Location: Phillip Island, Victoria
- Venue: Phillip Island Grand Prix Circuit

Results
Race 1
Distance	27 laps	120.015 km
Pole position	(New Zealand) Scott McLaughlin; DJR Team Penske	1:29.2292
Winner	(New Zealand) Scott McLaughlin; DJR Team Penske	47:44.6907
Race 2
Distance	45 laps	200.025 km
Pole position	(New Zealand) Scott McLaughlin; DJR Team Penske	1:29.5421
Winner	(New Zealand) Fabian Coulthard; DJR Team Penske	1:12:04.1541

The 2019 Phillip Island SuperSprint (known for sponsorship purposes as the WD-40 Phillip Island SuperSprint) was a motor racing event for the Supercars Championship, held on 12-14 April 2019. The event was held at the Phillip Island Grand Prix Circuit on Phillip Island, Victoria, and consisted of one race of 120 kilometres (27 laps) and one race of 200 kilometres (45 laps) in length. It was the fourth event of fifteen in the 2019 Supercars Championship and hosted Races 9 and 10 of the season.

The event was dominated by DJR Team Penske. Scott McLaughlin claimed both pole positions and won Race 9 while teammate Fabian Coulthard won Race 10.

== Report ==
=== Background ===
Scott McLaughlin entered the event holding a championship lead of 124 points over teammate Fabian Coulthard.

The format of this event was changed from the previous format of two 250 kilometre races to a SuperSprint format consisting of one race of 120 kilometres and one race consisting of 200 kilometres. The event was moved to become a double-header with the Tasmania SuperSprint on the previous weekend.

A new safety car procedure was trialled at this event. The trial saw the pitlane closed when a safety car was called in a bid to ease congestion and double stacking. Any car which had not completed its compulsory pit stop at the time the safety car was called would therefore have to wait until after the end of the safety car period to take its stop. Phillip Island was chosen as the venue for this trial due to its narrow pit lane and small pit bays.

== Results ==
=== Practice ===
Practice summary
Session	Day	Fastest lap				
Session	Day	No.	Driver	Team	Car	Time
Practice 1	Friday	99	(Australia) Anton de Pasquale	Erebus Motorsport	Holden Commodore ZB	1:31.3181
Practice 2	Friday	12	(New Zealand) Fabian Coulthard	DJR Team Penske	Ford Mustang GT	1:30.1807
Practice 3	Saturday	17	(New Zealand) Scott McLaughlin	DJR Team Penske	Ford Mustang GT	1:30.1861
Practice 4	Sunday	12	(New Zealand) Fabian Coulthard	DJR Team Penske	Ford Mustang GT	1:30.1872

=== Race 9 ===
==== Qualifying ====
Pos.	No.	Driver	Team	Car	Time	Gap	Grid
1	17	(New Zealand) Scott McLaughlin	DJR Team Penske	Ford Mustang GT	1:29.2292		1
2	12	(New Zealand) Fabian Coulthard	DJR Team Penske	Ford Mustang GT	1:29.8114	+0.5822	2
3	55	(Australia) Chaz Mostert	Tickford Racing	Ford Mustang GT	1:30.1031	+0.8739	3
4	7	(New Zealand) Andre Heimgartner	Kelly Racing	Nissan Altima L33	1:30.1429	+0.9137	4
5	23	(Australia) Will Davison	23Red Racing	Ford Mustang GT	1:30.2857	+1.0565	5
6	15	(Australia) Rick Kelly	Kelly Racing	Nissan Altima L33	1:30.3020	+1.0728	6
7	6	(Australia) Cam Waters	Tickford Racing	Ford Mustang GT	1:30.4441	+1.2149	7
8	200	(Australia) Scott Pye	Walkinshaw Andretti United	Holden Commodore ZB	1:30.4899	+1.2607	8
9	97	(New Zealand) Shane van Gisbergen	Triple Eight Race Engineering	Holden Commodore ZB	1:30.6059	+1.3768	9
10	35	(Australia) Todd Hazelwood	Matt Stone Racing	Holden Commodore ZB	1:30.6662	+1.437	10
11	5	(Australia) Lee Holdsworth	Tickford Racing	Ford Mustang GT	1:30.6294	+1.4003	11
12	9	(Australia) David Reynolds	Erebus Motorsport	Holden Commodore ZB	1:30.7432	+1.514	12
13	99	(Australia) Anton de Pasquale	Erebus Motorsport	Holden Commodore ZB	1:30.7866	+1.5574	13
14	8	(Australia) Nick Percat	Brad Jones Racing	Holden Commodore ZB	1:31.2873	+2.0581	14
15	14	(Australia) Tim Slade	Brad Jones Racing	Holden Commodore ZB	1:30.9813	+1.7522	15
16	18	(Australia) Mark Winterbottom	Team 18	Holden Commodore ZB	1:30.9823	+1.7531	16
17	88	(Australia) Jamie Whincup	Triple Eight Race Engineering	Holden Commodore ZB	1:31.2503	+2.0211	17
18	22	(Australia) James Courtney	Walkinshaw Andretti United	Holden Commodore ZB	1:31.2946	+2.0654	18
19	33	(New Zealand) Richie Stanaway	Garry Rogers Motorsport	Holden Commodore ZB	1:31.3255	+2.0964	19
20	3	(Australia) Garry Jacobson	Kelly Racing	Nissan Altima L33	1:31.4948	+2.2656	20
21	78	(Switzerland) Simona de Silvestro	Kelly Racing	Nissan Altima L33	1:31.6399	+2.4107	21
22	19	(Australia) Jack Le Brocq	Tekno Autosports	Holden Commodore ZB	1:31.7737	+2.5446	22
23	21	(Australia) Macauley Jones	Tim Blanchard Racing	Holden Commodore ZB	1:31.9718	+2.7426	23
24	34	(Australia) James Golding	Garry Rogers Motorsport	Holden Commodore ZB	5:35.3083	+4:06.0791	24

==== Race ====
Pos.	No.	Driver	Team	Car	Laps	Time / Retired	Grid	Points
1	17	(New Zealand) Scott McLaughlin	DJR Team Penske	Ford Mustang GT	27	47:44.6907	1	150
2	12	(New Zealand) Fabian Coulthard	DJR Team Penske	Ford Mustang GT	27	+1.240	2	138
3	7	(New Zealand) Andre Heimgartner	Kelly Racing	Nissan Altima L33	27	+2.846	4	129
4	9	(Australia) David Reynolds	Erebus Motorsport	Holden Commodore ZB	27	+4.327	12	120
5	55	(Australia) Chaz Mostert	Tickford Racing	Ford Mustang GT	27	+6.594	3	111
6	97	(New Zealand) Shane van Gisbergen	Triple Eight Race Engineering	Holden Commodore ZB	27	+10.108	9	102
7	15	(Australia) Rick Kelly	Kelly Racing	Nissan Altima L33	27	+13.516	6	96
8	200	(Australia) Scott Pye	Walkinshaw Andretti United	Holden Commodore ZB	27	+14.155	8	90
9	8	(Australia) Nick Percat	Brad Jones Racing	Holden Commodore ZB	27	+14.408	14	84
10	23	(Australia) Will Davison	23Red Racing	Ford Mustang GT	27	+15.068	5	78
11	35	(Australia) Todd Hazelwood	Matt Stone Racing	Holden Commodore ZB	27	+15.356	10	72
12	99	(Australia) Anton de Pasquale	Erebus Motorsport	Holden Commodore ZB	27	+16.435	13	69
13	34	(Australia) James Golding	Garry Rogers Motorsport	Holden Commodore ZB	27	+17.253	24	66
14	33	(New Zealand) Richie Stanaway	Garry Rogers Motorsport	Holden Commodore ZB	27	+18.305	19	63
15	5	(Australia) Lee Holdsworth	Tickford Racing	Ford Mustang GT	27	+18.718	11	60
16	78	(Switzerland) Simona de Silvestro	Kelly Racing	Nissan Altima L33	27	+19.027	21	57
17	14	(Australia) Tim Slade	Brad Jones Racing	Holden Commodore ZB	27	+19.595	15	54
18	21	(Australia) Macauley Jones	Tim Blanchard Racing	Holden Commodore ZB	27	+20.083	23	51
19	3	(Australia) Garry Jacobson	Kelly Racing	Nissan Altima L33	27	+21.628	20	48
20	19	(Australia) Jack Le Brocq	Tekno Autosports	Holden Commodore ZB	27	+35.987	22	45
21	18	(Australia) Mark Winterbottom	Team 18	Holden Commodore ZB	27	+1:33.067	16	42
22	22	(Australia) James Courtney	Walkinshaw Andretti United	Holden Commodore ZB	26	+1 lap	18	39
Ret	6	(Australia) Cam Waters	Tickford Racing	Ford Mustang GT	21	Suspension	7	
Ret	88	(Australia) Jamie Whincup	Triple Eight Race Engineering	Holden Commodore ZB	11	Wheel loss	17	

=== Race 10 ===
==== Qualifying ====
Pos.	No.	Driver	Team	Car	Time	Gap	Grid
1	17	(New Zealand) Scott McLaughlin	DJR Team Penske	Ford Mustang GT	1:29.5421		1
2	12	(New Zealand) Fabian Coulthard	DJR Team Penske	Ford Mustang GT	1:30.1787	+0.6365	2
3	55	(Australia) Chaz Mostert	Tickford Racing	Ford Mustang GT	1:30.2771	+0.7350	3
4	99	(Australia) Anton de Pasquale	Erebus Motorsport	Holden Commodore ZB	1:30.2774	+0.7352	4
5	6	(Australia) Cam Waters	Tickford Racing	Ford Mustang GT	1:30.3536	+0.8114	5
6	23	(Australia) Will Davison	23Red Racing	Ford Mustang GT	1:30.3807	+0.8386	6
7	97	(New Zealand) Shane van Gisbergen	Triple Eight Race Engineering	Holden Commodore ZB	1:30.5526	+1.0104	7
8	35	(Australia) Todd Hazelwood	Matt Stone Racing	Holden Commodore ZB	1:30.6512	+1.109	8
9	22	(Australia) James Courtney	Walkinshaw Andretti United	Holden Commodore ZB	1:30.7925	+1.2504	9
10	88	(Australia) Jamie Whincup	Triple Eight Race Engineering	Holden Commodore ZB	1:30.8482	+1.3061	10
11	15	(Australia) Rick Kelly	Kelly Racing	Nissan Altima L33	1:30.9520	+1.4098	11
12	8	(Australia) Nick Percat	Brad Jones Racing	Holden Commodore ZB	1:31.0314	+1.4892	12
13	7	(New Zealand) Andre Heimgartner	Kelly Racing	Nissan Altima L33	1:31.2478	+1.7056	13
14	34	(Australia) James Golding	Garry Rogers Motorsport	Holden Commodore ZB	1:31.4622	+1.9200	14
15	200	(Australia) Scott Pye	Walkinshaw Andretti United	Holden Commodore ZB	1:31.0300	+1.4878	15
16	9	(Australia) David Reynolds	Erebus Motorsport	Holden Commodore ZB	1:31.0909	+1.5488	16
17	33	(New Zealand) Richie Stanaway	Garry Rogers Motorsport	Holden Commodore ZB	1:31.1056	+1.5634	17
18	5	(Australia) Lee Holdsworth	Tickford Racing	Ford Mustang GT	1:31.2861	+1.7439	18
19	18	(Australia) Mark Winterbottom	Team 18	Holden Commodore ZB	1:31.3860	+1.8438	19
20	14	(Australia) Tim Slade	Brad Jones Racing	Holden Commodore ZB	1:31.5040	+1.9618	20
21	3	(Australia) Garry Jacobson	Kelly Racing	Nissan Altima L33	1:31.5159	+1.9737	21
22	21	(Australia) Macauley Jones	Tim Blanchard Racing	Holden Commodore ZB	1:31.6205	+2.0783	22
23	78	(Switzerland) Simona de Silvestro	Kelly Racing	Nissan Altima L33	1:31.7594	+2.2172	23
24	19	(Australia) Jack Le Brocq	Tekno Autosports	Holden Commodore ZB	1:31.8194	+2.2772	24

==== Race ====
Pos.	No.	Driver	Team	Car	Laps	Time / Retired	Grid	Points
1	12	(New Zealand) Fabian Coulthard	DJR Team Penske	Ford Mustang GT	45	1:12:04.1541	2	150
2	17	(New Zealand) Scott McLaughlin	DJR Team Penske	Ford Mustang GT	45	+0.679	1	138
3	99	(Australia) Anton de Pasquale	Erebus Motorsport	Holden Commodore ZB	45	+4.190	4	129
4	23	(Australia) Will Davison	23Red Racing	Ford Mustang GT	45	+5.899	6	120
5	55	(Australia) Chaz Mostert	Tickford Racing	Ford Mustang GT	45	+8.319	3	111
6	6	(Australia) Cam Waters	Tickford Racing	Ford Mustang GT	45	+11.095	5	102
7	97	(New Zealand) Shane van Gisbergen	Triple Eight Race Engineering	Holden Commodore ZB	45	+13.934	7	96
8	15	(Australia) Rick Kelly	Kelly Racing	Nissan Altima L33	45	+25.564	11	90
9	14	(Australia) Tim Slade	Brad Jones Racing	Holden Commodore ZB	45	+26.144	20	84
10	8	(Australia) Nick Percat	Brad Jones Racing	Holden Commodore ZB	45	+26.507	12	78
11	9	(Australia) David Reynolds	Erebus Motorsport	Holden Commodore ZB	45	+27.119	16	72
12	88	(Australia) Jamie Whincup	Triple Eight Race Engineering	Holden Commodore ZB	45	+28.159	10	69
13	7	(New Zealand) Andre Heimgartner	Kelly Racing	Nissan Altima L33	45	+30.156	13	66
14	5	(Australia) Lee Holdsworth	Tickford Racing	Ford Mustang GT	45	+30.401	18	63
15	200	(Australia) Scott Pye	Walkinshaw Andretti United	Holden Commodore ZB	45	+32.229	15	60
16	35	(Australia) Todd Hazelwood	Matt Stone Racing	Holden Commodore ZB	45	+33.211	8	57
17	18	(Australia) Mark Winterbottom	Team 18	Holden Commodore ZB	45	+40.827	19	54
18	78	(Switzerland) Simona de Silvestro	Kelly Racing	Nissan Altima L33	45	+42.465	23	51
19	3	(Australia) Garry Jacobson	Kelly Racing	Nissan Altima L33	45	+43.030	21	48
20	19	(Australia) Jack Le Brocq	Tekno Autosports	Holden Commodore ZB	45	+52.851	24	45
21	21	(Australia) Macauley Jones	Tim Blanchard Racing	Holden Commodore ZB	45	+53.962	22	42
22	34	(Australia) James Golding	Garry Rogers Motorsport	Holden Commodore ZB	44	+1 lap	14	39
23	33	(New Zealand) Richie Stanaway	Garry Rogers Motorsport	Holden Commodore ZB	44	+1 lap	17	36
24	22	(Australia) James Courtney	Walkinshaw Andretti United	Holden Commodore ZB	43	+2 laps	9	33
