= Simona de Silvestro =

Swiss-Italian racing driver

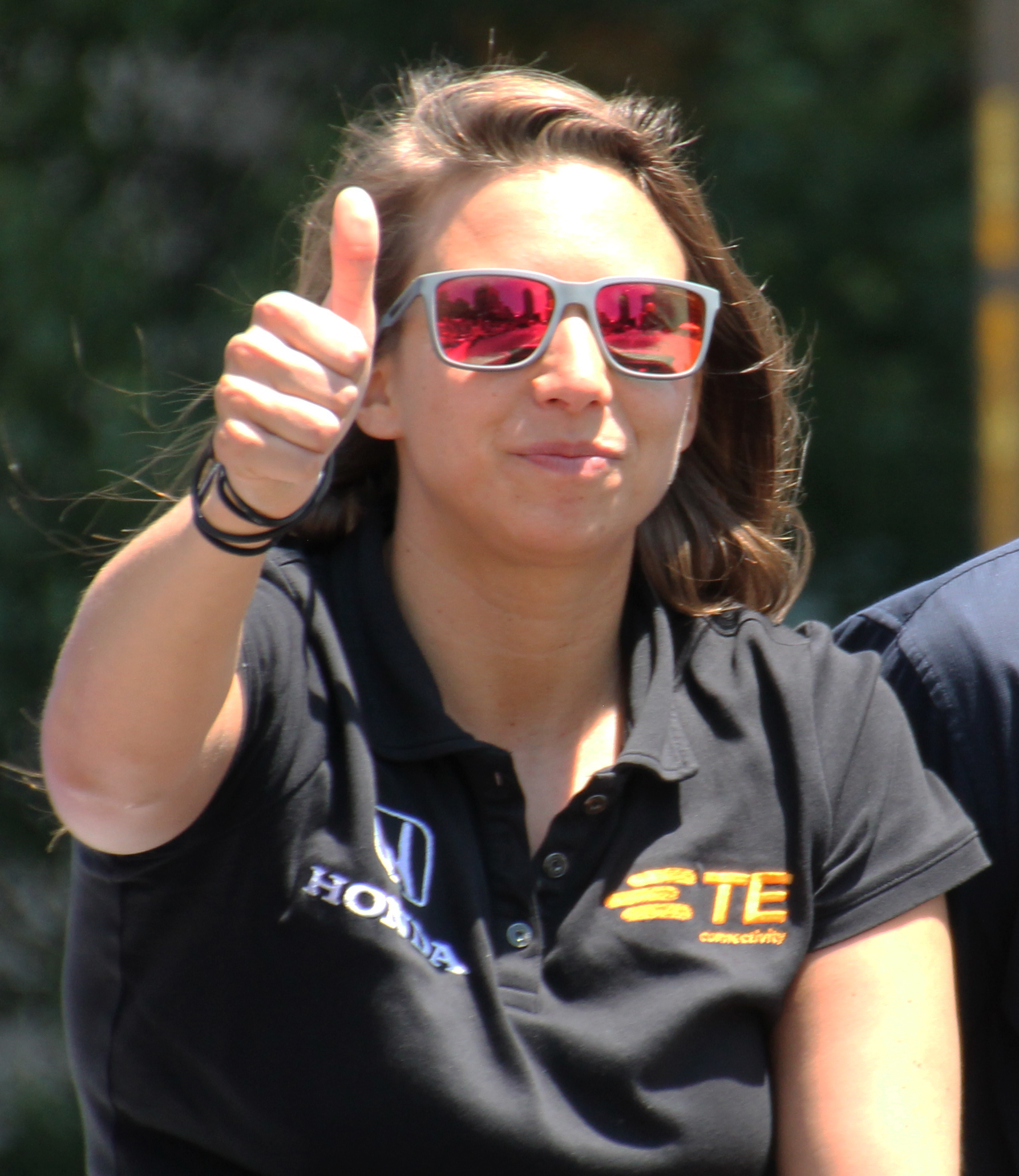
- Simona de Silvestro in 2015
- Nationality: (Switzerland) Swiss (Italy) Italian (Note: De Silvestro, a dual citizen, competed under an Italian racing licence earlier in her career. She switched to representing Switzerland in racing, but represents Italy in her bobsleigh career.)
- Born: 1 September 1988 (age 38) Thun, Switzerland
- Categorisation: FIA Gold (until 2026); FIA Silver (2027–)

IndyCar Series career
- 71 races run over 7 years
- Team: No. 16 (Paretta Autosport)
- 2022 position: 32nd
- Best finish: 13th (2013)
- First race: 2010 São Paulo Indy 300 (São Paulo)
- Last race: 2022 Firestone Grand Prix of Monterey (Laguna Seca)
Wins	Podiums	Poles
0	1	0

Formula E career
- Debut season: 2014–15
- Former teams: Andretti Autosport
- Starts: 12
- Championships: 0
- Wins: 0
- Podiums: 0
- Poles: 0
- Fastest laps: 0
- Best finish: 18th in 2015–16

Supercars Championship career
- Championships: 0
- Races: 91
- Wins: 0
- Podiums: 0
- Pole positions: 0
- 2019 position: 19th

Simona de Silvestro (born 1 September 1988) is a Swiss-Italian professional racing driver and bobsledder. She has raced in the IndyCar Series, Formula E and the Supercars Championship, having also served as test driver for the Sauber F1 Team and factory driver for Porsche. Since 2022 she has competed internationally in bobsleigh, where she reached the 2026 Winter Olympics.

== Racing career ==
=== Junior formulae ===
De Silvestro raced for Newman Wachs Racing's Nuclear Clean Air Energy-Entergy team in the Atlantic Championship in 2008 and for Team Stargate Worlds in 2009. She won the Atlantic race at the 2008 Grand Prix of Long Beach, making her the second woman to win in that series – after Katherine Legge – and providing NWR with its first win. She won four times during the 2009 season and led in points for most of the season, but ultimately finished third in the standings after retiring on the first lap during the season finale at Mazda Raceway Laguna Seca.

De Silvestro participated in an IndyCar Series test over 8–9 December 2009 at Sebring International Raceway, a joint effort between HVM Racing and Team Stargate Worlds.

=== IndyCar ===
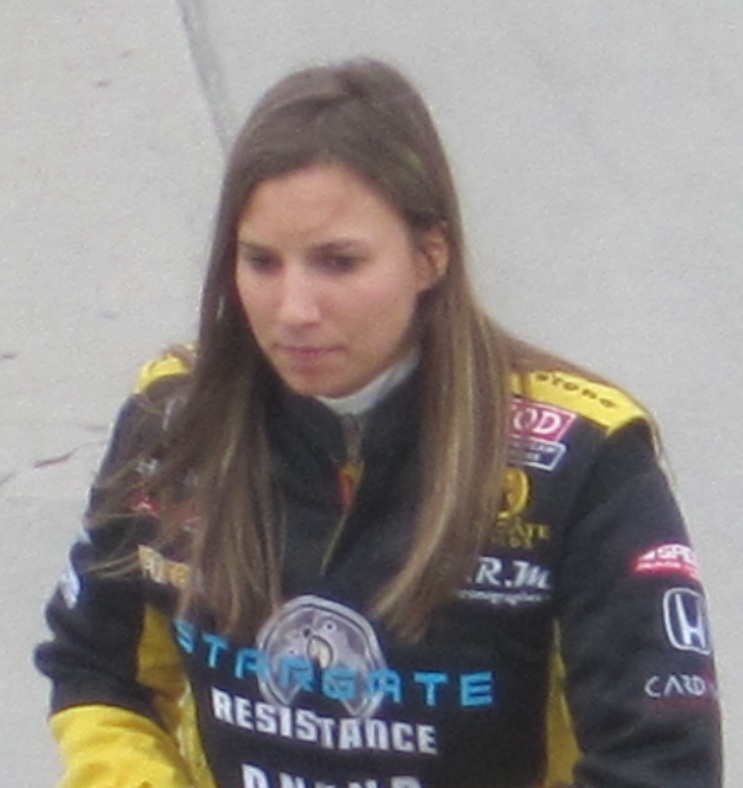
De Silvestro at the Indianapolis Motor Speedway in 2010

De Silvestro competed full-time in the IndyCar Series for HVM Racing for the 2010 season. On 22 May 2010, she qualified in the 22nd position for the 2010 Indianapolis 500. She finished the race in 14th position, and earned Indianapolis 500 Rookie of the Year honors. She suffered a burned right hand after a fiery crash at the Firestone 550 at Texas Motor Speedway on 5 June 2010. Her team strongly criticized IndyCar Series safety officials for their response to that accident. For the season, de Silvestro started seventeen races, finished ten, and recorded two top-ten finishes, with a best finish of eighth at Mid-Ohio. She finished 19th overall in the series standings and was runner-up to Alex Lloyd for rookie of the year honors.

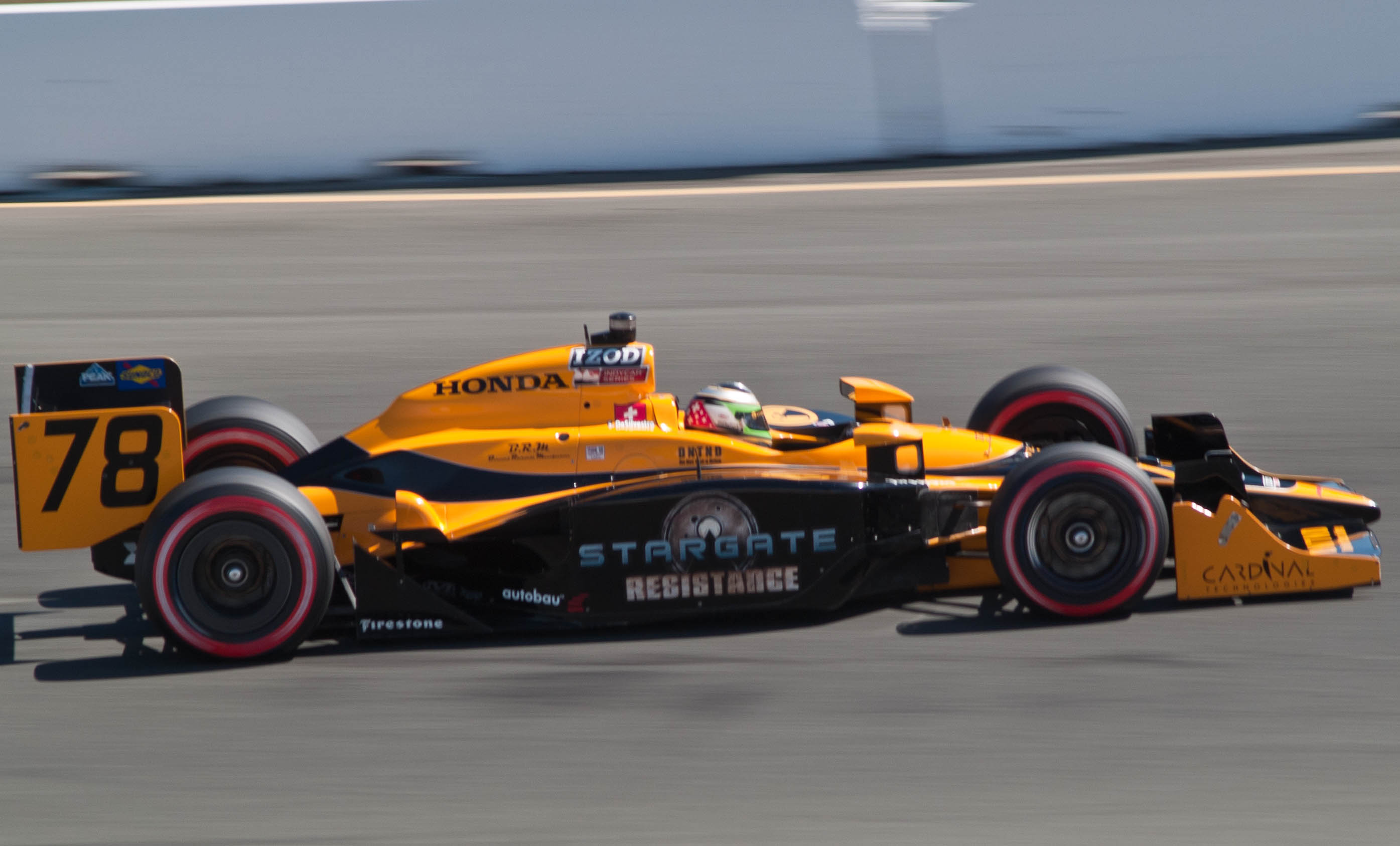
De Silvestro at the 2010 Indy Grand Prix of Sonoma

The 2011 season began with fourth- and ninth-place finishes at St. Petersburg and Barber; however the next race, at Long Beach, was not as successful: de Silvestro started 18th and finished 20th. At the next race, the São Paulo Indy 300, an accident between her and Hélio Castroneves put her nine laps down, after the race was postponed to the next morning due to severe rain conditions. She started 13th and finished 20th, nine laps down, but recorded the fastest lap of the race.

De Silvestro received second degree burns on her right hand and superficial burns on her left hand in a crash during practice for the 2011 Indianapolis 500 on 19 May. The crash, which sent her car sailing into the catch fence before flipping and landing on its left tires, was caused by a mechanical failure in the left rear of her No. 78 Dallara-Honda. On 21 May, using her backup car, she qualified 24th for the race with a four-lap average of 224.392 mph.

After a crash at the Milwaukee Mile during qualifying, de Silvestro was cleared to drive in the race, but withdrew after experiencing dizziness and impaired vision. At the next race, in Iowa, she was not cleared to compete, due to continuing dizziness.

De Silvestro missed round 13 of the season at Sonoma, after being refused entry to the United States. De Silvestro said she did not know why she was turned away. She finished twentieth overall in the 2011 series standings.

De Silvestro returned to HVM Racing for the 2012 IndyCar Series season, piloting the No. 78 Nuclear Clean Air Energy sponsored Dallara-Lotus. The entry was one of five cars to start the season powered by the new Lotus engine. The Lotus proved to be significantly underpowered compared to the Chevrolet and Honda engines used by the rest of the field. By the end of May, all entrants other than de Silvestro's No. 78 had abandoned the Lotus powerplant and switched to either Chevy or Honda. De Silvestro was saddled for the entire season with the inferior Lotus. The underpowered engine made it impossible for de Silvestro to be competitive, resulting in consistently poor qualifying and race results. On several occasions the car was black flagged for failing to maintain the minimum safe speed, including the 2012 Indianapolis 500. For the season, de Silvestro qualified for all fifteen races on the schedule, started fourteen, and finished six. Her best finish was 14th at Detroit and Iowa. She finished 24th overall in the series standings.

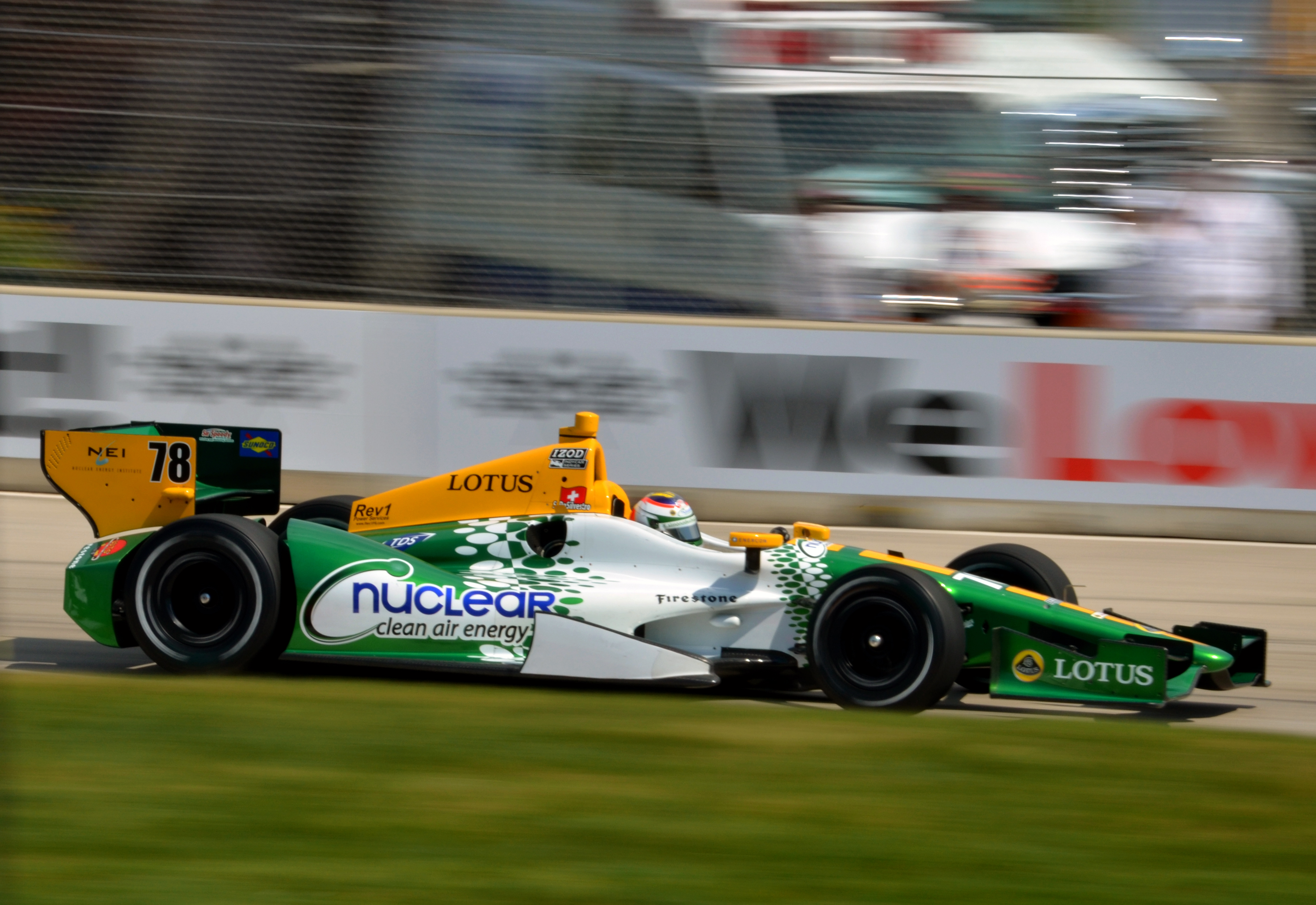
De Silvestro at the 2012 Chevrolet Detroit Belle Isle Grand Prix

On 30 October 2012, de Silvestro signed on with KV Racing Technology for the 2013 IndyCar Series season, driving the No. 78 Dallara-Chevrolet with sponsorship from Nuclear Clean Air Energy. De Silvestro joined veteran driver Tony Kanaan to make KV Racing Technology a two-car team for the 2013 season. On 5 October 2013 at the Grand Prix of Houston, de Silvestro finished second in the first race for her first podium finish, joining Danica Patrick and Sarah Fisher as the only women in IndyCar history to record a podium finish.

On 2 April 2015, de Silvestro announced she would drive the Andretti Autosport No. 29 Honda in the 2015 IndyCar Series season in an attempt to make the Indianapolis 500. De Silvestro finished fourth in the second race of the season, the Indy Grand Prix of Louisiana.

On 19 January 2021, Paretta Autosport announced they would make their IndyCar debut at the 2021 Indianapolis 500 with de Silvestro as the driver in the No. 16 Rocket Pro Chevrolet.

=== Formula One ===
In February 2014, Formula One team Sauber announced that de Silvestro would join the team as an "affiliated driver" and would undergo a year-long training programme with the team, with the ultimate objective of racing in 2015. De Silvestro began testing with the team at the end of April 2014 at Fiorano Circuit. She had her first drive in the 2012 Sauber on 26 April, and completed 112 laps during the test. However, in October 2014, Sauber team principal Monisha Kaltenborn stated that the team had suspended de Silvestro's driving chances due to contractual troubles.

=== Formula E ===
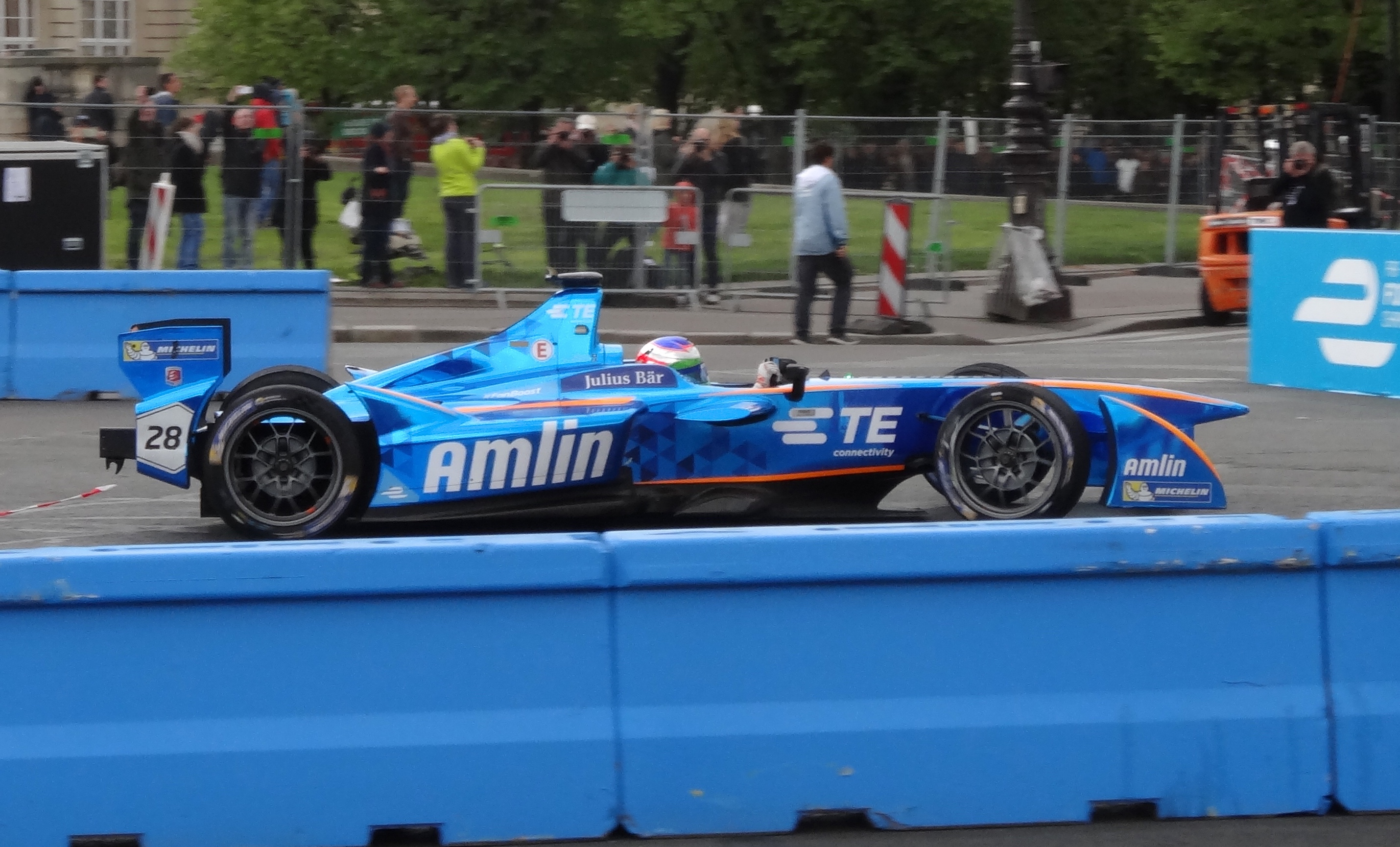
De Silvestro at the 2016 Paris ePrix

On 15 June 2015, it was announced de Silvestro would drive for Andretti's Formula E team at the championship's double-header finale in London. She was confirmed with the team full-time for the 2015-16 season opposite Formula Renault 3.5 champion Robin Frijns.

In 2016, de Silvestro became the first female driver to score points in Formula E with a ninth place in the 2016 Long Beach ePrix. She finished the championship in eighteenth place with four points.

De Silvestro returned to the driving seat for Venturi Racing at the December 2018 Ad Diriyah test, where up to nine women took part. She placed tenth overall, fastest of all female drivers. Between 2019 and 2023, De Silvestro served as Porsche's reserve driver. In 2024, she participated in the all-female pre-season test held at Circuito del Jarama, joining new team Kiro Race Co.

=== V8 Supercars ===
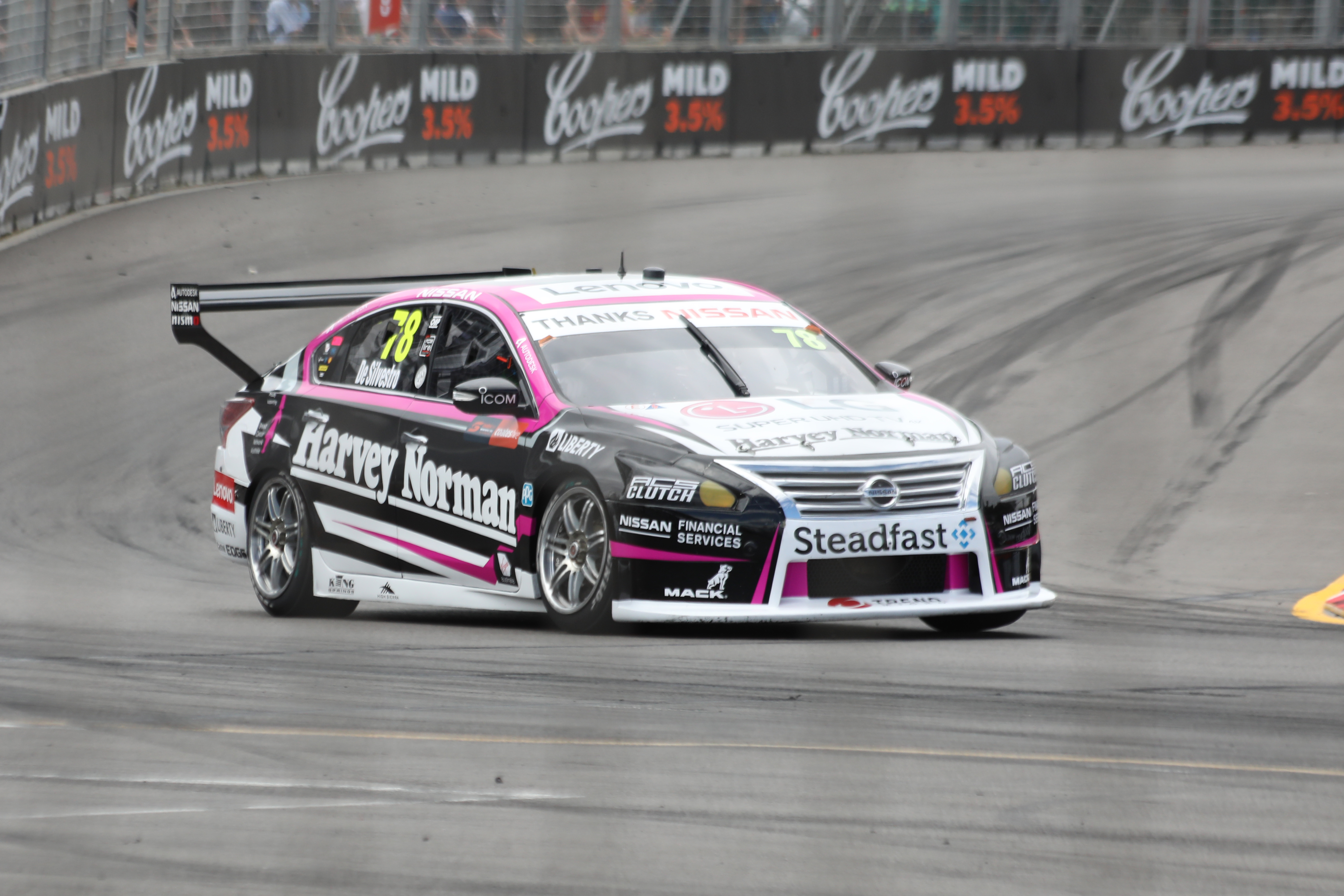
De Silvestro at the 2018 Newcastle 500

On 19 August 2015, it was announced that de Silvestro would partner Renee Gracie at Prodrive Racing Australia in the Bathurst 1000 for V8 Supercars. Following an impact with the wall at Forrest's Elbow on lap fifteen for Gracie, the car underwent extensive repairs before being sent back out to finish 21st and forty laps down – one more lap lost and the car would not have been classified.

On 5 September 2016, it was announced that de Silvestro had signed a three-year contract as a full-time driver for Nissan Motorsport in the Australian Supercars Championship, beginning from the 2017 season. This followed another appearance at Bathurst alongside Gracie, this time with the Nissan squad, where the pair managed to stay out of trouble amid the chaotic final laps and finish in 14th place and two laps down.

De Silvestro suffered a tumultuous debut season, starting on the back foot when she was spun by James Courtney whilst entering the pit-lane in Adelaide. The Swiss then largely avoided a multi-car pile-up at the following round in Tasmania before being one of multiple drivers penalised for a controversial pit-lane infringement at Phillip Island. Having struggled with lacklustre form through the middle of the season, De Silvestro looked on course for a top-ten finish at the Bathurst 1000 before spinning off a wet kerb and crashing with less than ten laps remaining. Strong performances at the season finale in Newcastle also went unrewarded when she was fenced by Tim Slade in the first race and spun by championship contender Scott McLaughlin in the second, leaving her as the lowest-classified driver in the standings to complete every event.

De Silvestro improved to 23rd in the overall standings in 2018, claiming her first top-ten finish in a fuel conservation race in Newcastle.

Following interest from Triple Eight Race Engineering to replace Craig Lowndes, De Silvestro remained with Kelly Racing for 2019. She picked up a best result of 7th in New Zealand following a safety car bungle, but otherwise struggled as the Kelly team had lost factory support for its Nissan Altimas at the end of the previous season. The Swiss confirmed her exit from the championship prior to the penultimate round at Sandown, finishing the season 19th in the standings.

De Silvestro made a cameo appearance in the 2023 Bathurst 1000 as a wildcard entry for Dick Johnson Racing; sharing a Ford Mustang with rookie Kai Allen, the pair finished a lap down in 20th.

=== GT3 ===
In 2020, de Silvestro returned to Europe as a factory Porsche GT driver; contesting the 2020 ADAC GT Masters for Timo Bernhard's Team75 with Klaus Bachler. She finished 23rd in the championship with 41 points. The duo switched to Herberth Motorsport for the 2021 ADAC GT Masters.

== Bobsleigh ==
In early 2022, De Silvestro announced that she had started training in the winter sport of bobsleigh, with a goal to compete for Italy at the 2026 Winter Olympics in monobob. Her first competitive event was the 2022 Swiss championships where she placed fifth. De Silvestro qualified for both the monobob and two-person disciplines through her results in the 2025–26 Bobsleigh World Cup, finishing 23rd overall in both.

== Personal life ==
De Silvestro is of Italian descent through her father and holds dual Swiss and Italian citizenship.

== Motorsport record ==
=== Career summary ===
Season	Series	Team	Races	Wins	Poles	F/laps	Podiums	Points	Position
2005	Formula Renault 2.0 Italy	Cram Competition	17	0	0	0	0	16	20th
2006	Formula BMW USA	EuroInternational	14	1	0	2	5	113	4th
2007	Champ Car Atlantic	Walker Racing	12	0	0	0	0	69	19th
2008	Atlantic Championship	Newman Wachs Racing	11	1	0	0	1	167	8th
2009	Atlantic Championship	Team Stargate Worlds	12	4	4	1	9	176	**3rd**
2010	IndyCar Series	HVM Racing	17	0	0	0	0	242	19th
2011	IndyCar Series	HVM Racing	15	0	0	1	0	225	20th
2012	IndyCar Series	HVM Racing	14	0	0	0	0	182	24th
2013	IndyCar Series	KV Racing Technology	19	0	0	0	1	362	13th
2014	Formula One	Sauber F1 Team	Affiliated driver						
2014–15	Formula E	Andretti Autosport	2	0	0	0	0	0	27th
2015	IndyCar Series	Andretti Autosport	3	0	0	0	0	66	30th
2015	International V8 Supercars Championship	Prodrive Racing Australia	1	0	0	0	0	84	54th
2015–16	Formula E	Amlin Andretti	10	0	0	0	0	4	18th
2016	International V8 Supercars Championship	Nissan Motorsport	1	0	0	0	0	126	50th
2017	Supercars Championship	Nissan Motorsport	26	0	0	0	0	1131	24th
2018	Supercars Championship	Nissan Motorsport	31	0	0	0	0	1323	23rd
2018–19	Formula E	Venturi Formula E Team	Test driver						
2019	Supercars Championship	Kelly Racing	31	0	0	0	0	1564	19th
2019	WeatherTech SportsCar Championship - GTD	Heinricher Racing with Meyer Shank Racing	1	0	0	0	0	19	58th
2019–20	Formula E	TAG Heuer Porsche Formula E Team	Test/development driver						
2020	ADAC GT Masters	KÜS Team75 Bernhard	10	0	0	0	0	41	23rd
2020	GT World Challenge Europe Endurance Cup	Rowe Racing	1	0	0	0	0	0	NC†
2020–21	Formula E	TAG Heuer Porsche Formula E Team	Reserve driver						
2021	ADAC GT Masters	Precote Herberth Motorsport	13	0	0	0	0	34	23rd
2021	IndyCar Series	Paretta Autosport	1	0	0	0	0	10	40th
2021	Porsche Carrera Cup Scandinavia	Porsche Experience Racing	3	0	0	1	0	35	16th
2021–22	Formula E	TAG Heuer Porsche Formula E Team	Reserve driver						
2022	IndyCar Series	Paretta Autosport	4	0	0	0	0	34	32nd
2022–23	Formula E	TAG Heuer Porsche Formula E Team	Reserve driver						
2023	Supercars Championship	Dick Johnson Racing	1	0	0	0	0	90	55th

^{†} As de Silvestro was a guest driver, she was ineligible to score points.

=== Complete Formula Renault 2.0 Italia results ===
Year	Team	1	2	3	4	5	6	7	8	9	10	11	12	13	14	15	16	17	DC	Points
2005	Cram Competition	VLL; 1; 9	VLL; 2; 20	IMO; 1 Ret	IMO; 2 Ret	SPA; 1; 19	SPA; 2; 17	MNZ; 1; 14	MNZ; 2; 5	MNZ; 3; 9	MUG; 1; 14	MUG; 2 Ret	MIS; 1; 17	MIS; 2; 9	MIS; 3 Ret	VAR; Ret	MNZ; 1; 16	MNZ; 2; 11	20th	16

=== Complete Formula BMW USA results ===
Year	Team	1	2	3	4	5	6	7	8	9	10	11	12	13	14	DC	Points
2006	EuroInternational	MOH; 1; 4	MOH; 2; 25	LIM; 1; 2	LIM; 2; 1	CGV; 1; 4	CGV; 2; 3	IMS; 1; 3	IMS; 2; 3	SJO; 1; 4	SJO; 2; 4	DEN; 1; 21	DEN; 2; 6	MOS; 1; 2	MOS; 2; 10	4th	133

=== American open-wheel racing results ===
(key) (Races in bold indicate pole position; races in italics indicate fastest lap)

==== Atlantic Championship/Champ Car Atlantic ====
Year	Team	1	2	3	4	5	6	7	8	9	10	11	12	Rank	Points
2007	Walker Racing	LVG; 17	LBH; 28	HOU; 15	POR1; 16	POR2; 16	CLE; 11	MTT; 7	TOR; 18	EDM1; 13	EDM2; 22	SJO; 10	ROA; 22	19th	69
2008	Newman Wachs Racing	LBH; 1	LS; 10	MTT; 9	EDM1; 8	EDM2; 19	ROA1; 9	ROA2; 18	TRR; 4	NJ; 11	UTA; 5	ATL; 4		8th	167
2009	Team Stargate Worlds	SEB; 5	**UTA**; 1	NJ1; 2	**NJ2**; 1	**LIM**; 1	ACC1; 3	ACC2; 2	MOH; 2	**TRR**; 1	MOS; 10	ATL; 2	LS; 10	3rd	176

Years	Teams	Races	Poles	Wins	Podiums (non-win)*	Top 10s (non-podium)**	Championships
3	3	35	4	5	5	10	0

* Podium (non-win) indicates second and third place finishes
** Top 10s (non-podium) indicates 4th through 10th place finishes

==== IndyCar Series ====
IndyCar Series results
Year	Team	No.	Chassis	Engine	1	2	3	4	5	6	7	8	9	10	11	12	13	14	15	16	17	18	19	Rank	Points	Ref
2010	HVM Racing	78	Dallara	Honda	SAO; 16	STP; 16	ALA; 21	LBH; 17	KAN; 21	INDY; 14	TXS; 24	IOW; 21	WGL; 24	TOR; 9	EDM; 22	MOH; 8	SNM; 13	CHI; 23	KTY; 25	MOT; 23	HMS; 23			19th	242	
2011	HVM Racing	78	Dallara	Honda	STP; 4	ALA; 9	LBH; 20	SAO; 20	INDY; 31	TXS; 26	TXS; 27	MIL; 25	IOW; DNS	TOR; 10	EDM; 24	MOH; 12	NHM; 16	SNM	BAL; 12	MOT; 14	KTY; 25	LVS^{1} C		20th	225	
2012	Lotus-HVM Racing	78	Dallara DW12	Lotus	STP; 24	ALA; 20	LBH; 20	SAO; 24	INDY; 32	DET; 14	TXS; DNS	MIL; 24	IOW; 14	TOR; 24	EDM; 23	MOH; 23	SNM; 17	BAL; 22	FON; 26					24th	182	
2013	KV Racing Technology	78	Dallara DW12	Chevrolet	STP; 6	ALA; 18	LBH; 9	SAO; 8	INDY; 17	DET; 16	DET; 24	TXS; 16	MIL; 24	IOW; 21	POC; 11	TOR; 10	TOR; 14	MOH; 11	SNM; 9	BAL; 5	HOU; 2	HOU; 10	FON; 8	13th	362	
2015	Andretti Autosport	25	Dallara DW12	Honda	STP; 18	NLA; 4	LBH	ALA	IMS															30th	66	
2015	Andretti Autosport	29	Dallara DW12	Honda						INDY; 19	DET	DET	TXS	TOR	FON	MIL	IOW	MOH	POC	SNM				30th	66	
2021	Paretta Autosport	16	Dallara DW12	Chevrolet	ALA	STP	TXS	TXS	IMS	INDY; 31	DET	DET	ROA	MOH	NSH	IMS	GTW	POR	LAG	LBH				40th	10	
2022	Paretta Autosport	16	Dallara DW12	Chevrolet	STP	TXS	LBH	ALA	IMS	INDY	DET	ROA; 21	MOH; 18	TOR	IOW	IOW	IMS	NSH; 26	GTW	POR	LAG; 22			32nd	34	

^{1} The Las Vegas Indy 300 was abandoned after Dan Wheldon died from injuries sustained in a 15-car crash on lap 11.

Years	Teams	Races	Poles	Wins	Top 5s	Top 10s	Indianapolis 500 wins	Championships
7	5	71	0	0	4	15	0	0

==== Indianapolis 500 ====
Year	Chassis	Engine	Start	Finish	Team
2010	Dallara	Honda	22	14	HVM Racing
2011	Dallara	Honda	24	31	HVM Racing
2012	Dallara	Lotus	32	32	Lotus-HVM Racing
2013	Dallara	Chevrolet	24	17	KV Racing Technology
2015	Dallara	Honda	19	19	Andretti Autosport
2021	Dallara	Chevrolet	33	31	Paretta Autosport

=== Complete Formula E results ===
(key) (Races in bold indicate pole position; races in italics indicate fastest lap)

Year	Team	Chassis	Powertrain	1	2	3	4	5	6	7	8	9	10	11	Pos	Points
2014–15	Andretti Autosport	Spark SRT01-e	SRT01-e	BEI	PUT	PDE	BUE	MIA	LBH	MCO	BER	MSC	LDN; 11	LDN; 12	27th	0
2015–16	Amlin Andretti	Spark SRT01-e	SRT01-e	BEI; Ret	PUT; 13	PDE; 11	BUE; 14	MEX; 14	LBH; 9	PAR; 15	BER; 9	LDN; 14	LDN; Ret		18th	4

=== Complete Supercars Championship results ===
Supercars results
Year	Team	No.	Car	1	2	3	4	5	6	7	8	9	10	11	12	13	14	15	16	17	18	19	20	21	22	23	24	25	26	27	28	29	30	31	32	33	34	35	36	Position	Points
2015	Prodrive Racing Australia	200	Ford FG X Falcon	ADE; R1	ADE; R2	ADE; R3	SYM; R4	SYM; R5	SYM; R6	BAR; R7	BAR; R8	BAR; R9	WIN; R10	WIN; R11	WIN; R12	HID; R13	HID; R14	HID; R15	TOW; R16	TOW; R17	QLD; R18	QLD; R19	QLD; R20	SMP; R21	SMP; R22	SMP; R23	SAN; R24	BAT; R25; 21	SUR; R26	SUR; R27	PUK; R28	PUK; R29	PUK; R30	PHI; R31	PHI; R32	PHI; R33	SYD; R34	SYD; R35	SYD; R36	54th	84
2016	Nissan Motorsport	360	Nissan Altima L33	ADE; R1	ADE; R2	ADE; R3	SYM; R4	SYM; R5	PHI; R6	PHI; R7	BAR; R8	BAR; R9	WIN; R10	WIN; R11	HID; R12	HID; R13	HID; R14	TOW; R15	QLD; R16	QLD; R17	SMP; R18	SMP; R19	SAN; R20	BAT; R21; 14	SUR; R22	SUR; R23	PUK; R24	PUK; R25	PUK; R26	PUK; R27	SYD; R28	SYD; R29								50th	126
2017	Nissan Motorsport	78	Nissan Altima L33	ADE; R1; 20	ADE; R2; 23	SYM; R3; 15	SYM; R4; 15	PHI; R5; 13	PHI; R6; 13	BAR; R7; 23	BAR; R8; 25	WIN; R9; 23	WIN; R10; 20	HID; R11; 20	HID; R12; 28	TOW; R13; 18	TOW; R14; 23	QLD; R15; 27	QLD; R16; 19	SMP; R17; 19	SMP; R18; 23	SAN; Q 22	SAN; R19; 18	BAT; R20; Ret	SUR; R21; 16	SUR; R22; 23	PUK; R23; 18	PUK; R24; 17	NEW; R25; 20	NEW; R26; 17										24th	1131
2018	Nissan Motorsport	78	Nissan Altima L33	ADE; R1; 18	ADE; R2; 18	MEL; R3; Ret	MEL; R4; 23	MEL; R5; 23	MEL; R6; 16	SYM; R7; 23	SYM; R8; 21	PHI; R9; 24	PHI; R10; 22	BAR; R11; 15	BAR; R12; 12	WIN; R13; 22	WIN; R14; 23	HID; R15; 22	HID; R16; 17	TOW; R17; 25	TOW; R18; 22	QLD; R19; 19	QLD; R20; 20	SMP; R21; 14	BEN; R22; 23	BEN; R23; 23	SAN; QR; 22	SAN; R24; Ret	BAT; R25; 14	SUR; R26; 18	SUR; R27; C	PUK; R28; 21	PUK; R29; 18	NEW; R30; 10	NEW; R31; 24					23rd	1323
2019	Kelly Racing	78	Nissan Altima L33	ADE; R1; 15	ADE; R2; 16	MEL; R3; 18	MEL; R4; 19	MEL; R5; 17	MEL; R6; 21	SYM; R7; 21	SYM; R8; 21	PHI; R9; 15	PHI; R10; 18	BAR; R11; 12	BAR; R12; 12	WIN; R13; 23	WIN; R14; 23	HID; R15; 19	HID; R16; 20	TOW; R17; 19	TOW; R18; 10	QLD; R19; 18	QLD; R20; 19	BEN; R21; Ret	BEN; R22; 22	PUK; R23; 16	PUK; R24; 7	BAT; R25; 13	SUR; R26; 21	SUR; R27; 22	SAN; QR; 12	SAN; R28; 15	NEW; R29; 19	NEW; R30; 18						19th	1564
2023	Dick Johnson Racing	98	Ford Mustang S650	NEW; R1	NEW; R2	MEL; R3	MEL; R4	MEL; R5	MEL; R6	BAR; R7	BAR; R8	BAR; R9	SYM; R10	SYM; R11	SYM; R12	HID; R13	HID; R14	HID; R15	TOW; R16	TOW; R17	SMP; R18	SMP; R19	BEN; R20	BEN; R21	BEN; R22	SAN; R23	BAT; R24; 20	SUR; R25	SUR; R26	ADE; R27	ADE; R28									55th	90

=== Complete Bathurst 1000 results ===
Year	Team	Car	Co-driver	Position	Laps
2015	Prodrive Racing Australia	Ford Falcon FG X	(Australia) Renee Gracie	21st	121
2016	Nissan Motorsport	Nissan Altima L33	(Australia) Renee Gracie	14th	159
2017	Nissan Motorsport	Nissan Altima L33	(Australia) David Russell	DNF	152
2018	Nissan Motorsport	Nissan Altima L33	(Australia) Alex Rullo	14th	161
2019	Kelly Racing	Nissan Altima L33	(Australia) Alex Rullo	13th	160
2023	Dick Johnson Racing	Ford Mustang S650	(Australia) Kai Allen	20th	160

=== Complete WeatherTech SportsCar Championship results ===
(key) (Races in bold indicate pole position; races in italics indicate fastest lap)

Year	Entrant	Class	Make	Engine	1	2	3	4	5	6	7	8	9	10	11	Rank	Points
2019	Heinricher Racing with Meyer Shank Racing	GTD	Acura NSX GT3	Acura 3.5 L Turbo V6	DAY; 12	SEB	MOH	DET	WGL	MOS	LIM	ELK	VIR	LGA	PET	58th	42

== Bobsled record ==
=== Olympic Games ===
Games	Discipline	Co-driver/s	Overall time	Rank
(Italy) 2026 Milano-Cortina	Monobob	—N/a	3:02.52	23rd
(Italy) 2026 Milano-Cortina	Two-woman	Anna Costella	2:54.88	23rd

== Notes ==
Awards and achievements
Preceded by Alex Tagliani	Indianapolis 500; Rookie of the Year; 2010	Succeeded by J. R. Hildebrand
