= 2017 Ipswich SuperSprint =

2017 V8 Supercar championship race

(Queensland) 2017 Coates Hire Ipswich SuperSprint
Event Information
- Round 8 of 14 in the 2017 International V8 Supercars Championship
- Date: 28–30 July 2017
- Location: Willowbank, Queensland
- Venue: Queensland Raceway

Results
Race 1
Distance	39 laps	120 km
Pole position	(New Zealand) Scott McLaughlin; DJR Team Penske	1:08.8167
Winner	(New Zealand) Scott McLaughlin; DJR Team Penske	46:36.5252
Race 2
Distance	65 laps	200 km
Pole position	(New Zealand) Scott McLaughlin; DJR Team Penske	1:08.4208
Winner	(Australia) Chaz Mostert; Rod Nash Racing	1:21:42.7651

The 2017 Coates Hire Ipswich SuperSprint was a motor racing event for the Supercars Championship, held on the weekend of 28 to 30 July 2017. The event was held at Queensland Raceway near Ipswich, Queensland and consisted of two races, 120 and 200 kilometres in length. It is the eighth event of fourteen in the 2017 Supercars Championship and hosted Races 15 and 16 of the season.

== Background ==
=== Driver changes ===
Lucas Dumbrell Motorsport replaced Aaren Russell with Alex Davison for this and the following event.

This was the fourth and final round in which Super2 Series wildcards were allowed to compete in the main class. Shae Davies, Todd Hazelwood, Jack Le Brocq and James Golding were the four drivers to step up for this round.

== Results ==
=== Race 15 ===
==== Race ====
Pos	No.	Driver	Team	Car	Laps	Time / Retired	Grid	Points
1	17	(New Zealand) Scott McLaughlin	DJR Team Penske	Ford FG X Falcon	39	46:36.5252	1	150
2	55	(Australia) Chaz Mostert	Rod Nash Racing	Ford FG X Falcon	39	+3.2471	3	138
3	97	(New Zealand) Shane van Gisbergen	Triple Eight Race Engineering	Holden VF Commodore	39	+4.7006	7	129
4	14	(Australia) Tim Slade	Brad Jones Racing	Holden VF Commodore	39	+5.1590	4	120
5	888	(Australia) Craig Lowndes	Triple Eight Race Engineering	Holden VF Commodore	39	+9.0852	2	111
6	12	(New Zealand) Fabian Coulthard	DJR Team Penske	Ford FG X Falcon	39	+9.5798	13	102
7	8	(Australia) Nick Percat	Brad Jones Racing	Holden VF Commodore	39	+14.4562	10	96
8	15	(Australia) Rick Kelly	Nissan Motorsport	Nissan L33 Altima	39	+17.2440	6	90
9	5	(Australia) Mark Winterbottom	Prodrive Racing Australia	Ford FG X Falcon	39	+17.4373	5	84
10	9	(Australia) David Reynolds	Erebus Motorsport	Holden VF Commodore	39	+20.6651	11	78
11	33	(Australia) Garth Tander	Garry Rogers Motorsport	Holden VF Commodore	39	+21.2536	17	72
12	18	(Australia) Lee Holdsworth	Team 18	Holden VF Commodore	39	+21.7482	21	69
13	2	(Australia) Scott Pye	Walkinshaw Racing	Holden VF Commodore	39	+23.0767	16	66
14	22	(Australia) James Courtney	Walkinshaw Racing	Holden VF Commodore	39	+24.7500	19	63
15	23	(Australia) Michael Caruso	Nissan Motorsport	Nissan L33 Altima	39	+26.6376	8	60
16	6	(Australia) Cam Waters	Prodrive Racing Australia	Ford FG X Falcon	39	+27.5144	9	57
17	19	(Australia) Will Davison	Tekno Autosports	Holden VF Commodore	39	+32.0938	15	54
18	7	(Australia) Todd Kelly	Nissan Motorsport	Nissan L33 Altima	39	+33.1718	23	51
19	28	(Australia) Jack Le Brocq	MW Motorsport	Nissan L33 Altima	39	+39.1977	24	48
20	88	(Australia) Jamie Whincup	Triple Eight Race Engineering	Holden VF Commodore	39	+39.5466	14	45
21	21	(Australia) Tim Blanchard	Tim Blanchard Racing	Holden VF Commodore	39	+40.1064	22	42
22	35	(Australia) Todd Hazelwood	Matt Stone Racing	Holden VF Commodore	39	+41.7361	20	39
23	99	(Australia) Dale Wood	Erebus Motorsport	Holden VF Commodore	39	+42.9319	18	36
24	31	(Australia) James Golding	Garry Rogers Motorsport	Holden VF Commodore	39	+44.1120	25	33
25	26	(Australia) Shae Davies	MW Motorsport	Nissan L33 Altima	39	+45.4063	26	30
26	3	(Australia) Alex Davison	Lucas Dumbrell Motorsport	Holden VF Commodore	39	+48.5001	29	27
27	78	(Switzerland) Simona de Silvestro	Nissan Motorsport	Nissan L33 Altima	37	+2 Laps	27	24
28	34	(Australia) James Moffat	Garry Rogers Motorsport	Holden VF Commodore	31	+8 Laps	28	21
DNF	56	(Australia) Jason Bright	Britek Motorsport	Ford FG X Falcon	33	Engine	12	
DNF	62	(Australia) Alex Rullo	Lucas Dumbrell Motorsport	Holden VF Commodore	0	Accident Damage	30	
