= Todd Hazelwood =

Australian racing driver (born 1995)

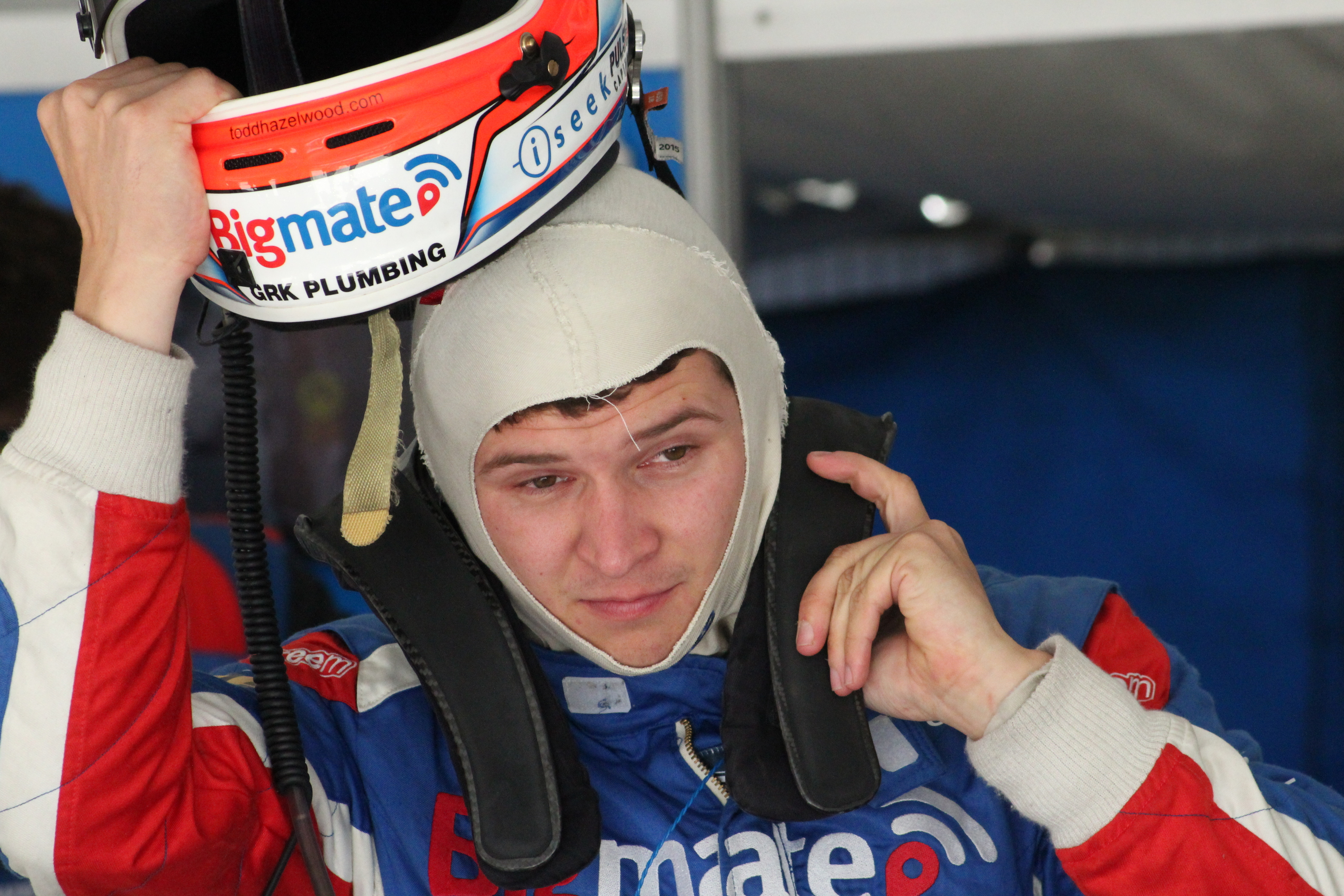
- Todd Hazelwood in 2017
- Nationality: Australian
- Born: Todd Matthew Hazelwood; 25 September 1995 (age 31) Adelaide, South Australia
- Categorisation: FIA Gold

Supercars Championship career
- Car number: 17
- Current team: Dick Johnson Racing
- Championships: 0
- Races: 196
- Wins: 2
- Podiums: 3
- Pole positions: 2
- 2024 position: 25th (603 pts)

Todd Matthew Hazelwood (born 25 September 1995) is an Australian professional racing driver competing in the Repco Supercars Championship for Dick Johnson Racing as a co-driver in the Shell V-Power Racing Ford Mustang.

Hazelwood's career in Supercars Championship includes 150+ races with podium finishes and pole positions during this time with multiple teams.

Hazelwood previously competed in the Dunlop Super2 Series, and won the series with Matt Stone Racing in a Holden VF Commodore in 2017.

Hazelwood also won the prestigious Mike Kable Young Gun Award in 2014.

== Racing career ==
=== Karting ===
Hazelwood started his racing career at the age of seven with his first event at the Adelaide Dirt Kart Club. He managed to progress quickly as a rookie in 2003 and instantly moved into the Juniors division at the age of eight. He went on to claim second in his first ever Australian Title and went on to win three State Titles before making the switch to Bitumen Karts.

In 2008, Hazelwood won his first race meeting on Bitumen and went on to achieve at the highest level around Australia. This included winning five Open State Titles, four Closed State Titles and two pole positions at Australian Titles. He also managed to win plenty of major karting events including the City of Melbourne and City of Adelaide Titles.

=== Formula Ford ===
At the end of the 2010 season, Hazelwood was selected from Arrow Racing Karts to test drive a Formula Ford at Winton Raceway. Along with many other karters, this was his first time in a race car on an open circuit. After being very successful on his first test, he was then selected to drive a race meeting in the 2011 South Australian State Series Championships where he finished second on debut. Hazelwood and his family couldn't continue to fund the remaining rounds for 2011 and elected to start fundraise and save for the 2012 season.

After a slim year of racing and lots of fundraising, Hazelwood was chosen to be the next Fujitsu 'Cool Driver' for the 2012 Victorian Formula Ford State Series. In a competitive year with fields over 40+ at some events, he managed to finish fourth in the series with one of the oldest chassis/engine combinations in the field.

=== Formula 3 Australian Drivers Championship ===
In 2013, Hazelwood made his debut in the Australian Formula 3 National Championship with R-Tek Motorsport in a Dallara F304. He raced the full season with the team and finished second in the Championship standings in his rookie season.

Highlights include his first pole position and round win at Sydney Motorsport Park.

=== Super2 Series ===
Hazelwood started his Development Series career by winning the Shannons Supercar Showdown in 2013 with Supercars team Prodrive Racing Australia (then Ford Performance Racing). The team helped field a car for Hazelwood to race in the final round of the 2013 Dunlop V8 Supercar Series, with Minda Motorsport. Hazelwood came back in 2014 with Matt Stone Racing driving the iSeek backed Ford FG Falcon. He finished eighth overall, and was the highest placed rookie with four top-five finishes and being awarded the V8 Supercars Mike Kable Young Gun Award.

In 2015, Hazelwood returned in the same car with Matt Stone Racing. He achieved his very first overall podium at the Sydney 500 and finished fourth overall in the series standings.

For 2016, Hazelwood had a few changes over the offseason including changing to a Holden VF Commodore, with a Car of the Future (COTF) specification chassis. He finished in the top-three four times throughout the season. He finished third in the series and also won the Supercars Privateers Cup for the highest placed team/driver not affiliated with a main series team.

In 2017, Hazelwood again drove a VF Holden Commodore from Matt Stone Racing supported by Bigmate. He consistently qualified and finished in the top-ten all year long. This included 14 front row starts, 13 podiums and six race wins. A total of three pole positions also helped him receive the Armor All Pole Position Award. With his dominant and consistent results, Hazelwood won the Dunlop Super2 Series Title by 95 points over Paul Dumbrell.

=== Supercars Championship ===
==== Wildcard entry and Endurance races (2017) ====
Hazelwood made his Supercars Championship debut with Matt Stone Racing as a wildcard entry at the 2017 Ipswich SuperSprint, finishing 22nd and 18th. He made his Enduro Cup debut driving with Tim Blanchard at the 2017 Sandown 500, though the car did not start the race after Hazelwood was involved in a major accident during the first qualifying race. The duo finished 12th at the Bathurst 1000 and 15th and 20th at the Gold Coast 600 to finish 22nd in the Enduro Cup.

==== Matt Stone Racing (2018–19, 2022) ====
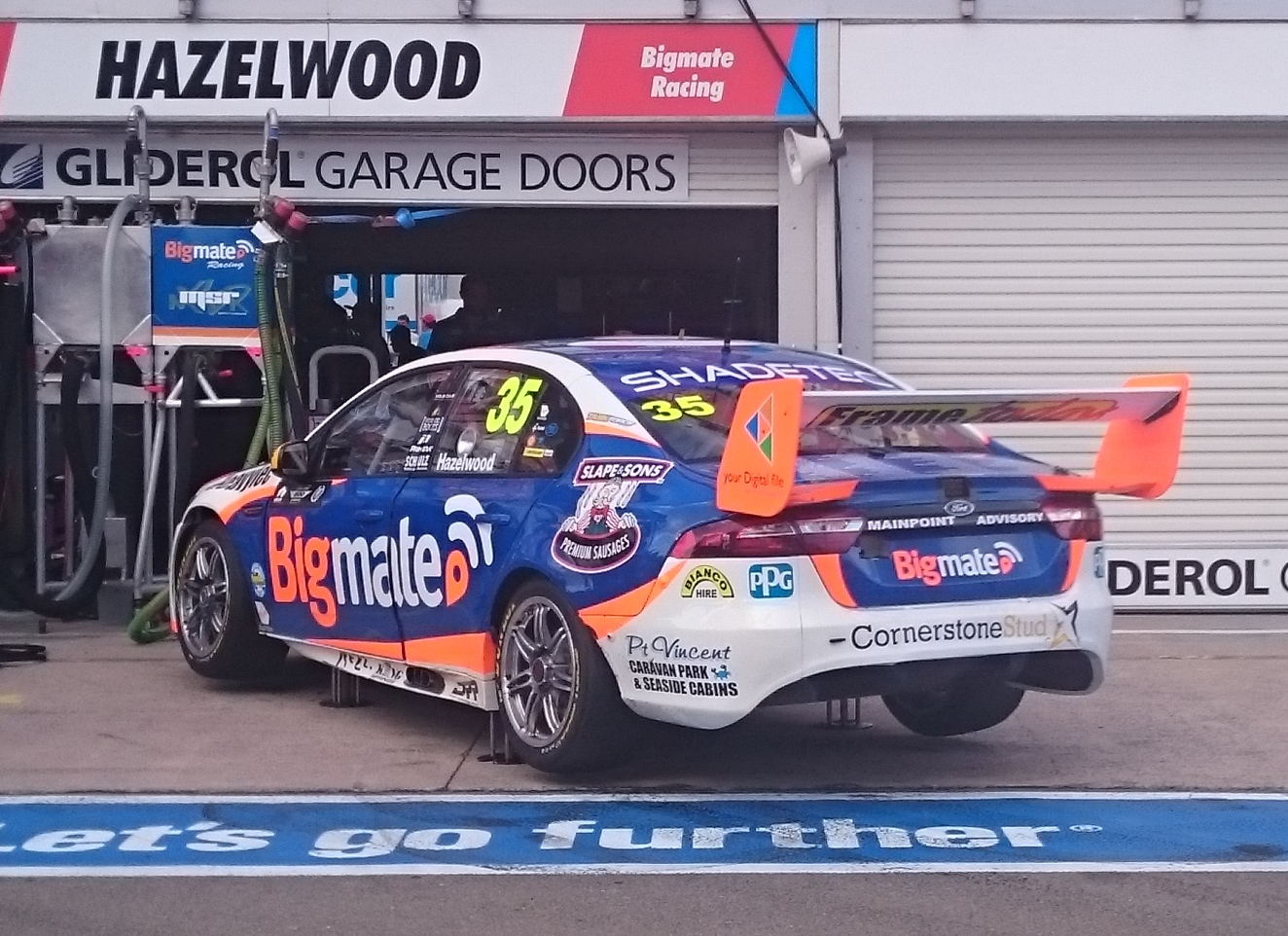
Hazelwood's Ford Falcon FG X at the 2018 Adelaide 500

Hazelwood made his full-time debut in 2018, moving up with Matt Stone Racing with the team acquiring an ex-DJR Team Penske Ford Falcon FG X. The team and driver struggled with the adjustment, leading to a mid-season switch of chassis to the Holden VF Commodore used in Super2 in 2017 at The Bend SuperSprint. A trying season continued, and Hazelwood finished 26th in the championship with a best race finish of 13th at the Newcastle 500. He and Bryce Fullwood would finish in 20th and two laps down at the Bathurst 1000 after Fullwood spun into the sand-trap at Murrays' Corner on lap 94.

Hazelwood continued with Matt Stone Racing in 2019, with the team acquiring an ex-Jamie Whincup Holden ZB Commodore and a technical alliance with Triple Eight Race Engineering. Results immediately improved, with Hazelwood making his first Top 10 Shootout and achieving his first top-ten finish during the second race at the Adelaide 500. Hazelwood achieved a career best finish during the 2019 season, a fifth placing during the Pukekohe round. Hazelwood finished his final race with MSR on a high in a very strong 10th at the Newcastle 500.

Hazelwood famously returned to MSR in 2022 after a two-year absence with Brad Jones Racing. Racing in the #35 Truck Assist ZB Commodore, The start of the year was very promising which included multiple top-five and top-ten finishes. After being placed inside the top-ten of the Championship standings after round #5, the back half of the season would take a turn for the worse as Hazelwood and his team suffered from failures and unlucky racing incidents, tumbling down to 18th in the Championship standings.

==== Brad Jones Racing (2020–2021) ====
Hazelwood confirmed his move from Matt Stone Racing to Brad Jones Racing in November 2019, replacing Tim Slade who left to join Scott McLaughlin and DJR Team Penske in a co-driver role. 2020 proved to be a breakthrough season for Hazelwood with the 24 year old achieving his maiden podium finish with a third at Sydney Motorsport Park and maiden pole position at Townsville. The year produced many highlights, including fighting for a race wins at Sydney and Townsville. The year did come with some battles as Hazelwood suffered from a number of setbacks hurting the overall Championship finish ending 17th in the points.

BJR re-signed Hazelwood for 2021 and will start the season opener at the Bathurst 500 in the #14 Dunlop Super Dealer Racing livery. He then raced at the Sandown SuperSprint in the #14 Cub Cadet Mowers Racing livery. For Bathurst 1000, he drove with Dean Fiore where they finished eighth, being a personal best Bathurst 1000 result for Hazelwood. Hazelwood managed to achieve 12 top-ten race results along with four top-five results, finishing the season in 13th.

==== Blanchard Racing Team (2023) ====
Hazelwood raced for Melbourne-based Supercars team, Blanchard Racing Team in the #3 CoolDrive Auto Parts Ford Mustang. 2023 was the introduction of the new Supercars platform, 'Gen3' and was a huge challenge for all teams to be equipped and ready for the season ahead. He had a solid start to the year and was eighth in the Championship after round four. The team suffered from a severe staff loss during the race season and results took a turn for the worse for the single car operation. Hazelwood finished the season strong featuring in the Top Ten Shootout at Sandown 500 and Adelaide 500, but ultimately was a disappointing year for Hazelwood finishing 21st in the Championship.

==== Erebus Motorsport (2024) ====
For 2024, Hazelwood signed with Erebus Motorsport as a co-driver for the first time since 2017, stepping down from racing full time in the Supercars Championship. Initially signed with Jack Le Brocq for the season ahead, Todd was sensationally called up to fill in for reigning Supercars Champion, Brodie Kostecki for the start of the 2024 season. He stepped up and raced at both the Bathurst 500 and Formula 1 AGP in the #99 Erebus Motorsport Camaro before Kostecki made the call to return and drive once again. During this time, the team elected for Hazelwood to drive with Kostecki for the Enduro Season with Todd stepping in behind the wheel of the #1 Camaro at Sandown 500 and Bathurst 1000. After running in podium contention during the Sandown 500, the team suffered from a mechanical failure putting both drivers out of the race. With a high level of motivation to be better, Kostecki and Hazelwood went to Bathurst full of confidence and determined to fight back after a disappointing Sandown. Brodie qualified on Pole Position and both drivers never looked back all day on race day. Leading from start to finish, it was a dominant race from the team and drivers. The winning time of 5 hours and 58 minutes was the fastest in the history of the Bathurst 1000, aided by just one safety car period, and the first to be completed in less than six hours. Ironically, it was also Hazelwood's maiden Supercars race win whilst becoming just the 66th winner of the Bathurst 1000.

==== Dick Johnson Racing (2025) ====
Hazelwood joined Dick Johnson Racing in 2025 as a co-driver for Brodie Kostecki. It had been a lifelong dream for Hazelwood to join the team at Dick Johnson Racing and his first Enduro Cup with the team resulted in a win at The Bend 500] and pole position at the Bathurst 1000.

Hazelwood continued in his co-driver role with Kostecki at DJR for 2026, however at the Darwin Triple Crown, Hazelwood filled in for Kostecki for Race 19 of the championship due to Kostecki being unwell. Hazelwood had already been at the event due to his commitments in the Australian National Trans-Am Series as a support category for the event, and had participated in a Trans-Am race earlier in the day prior to his call-up to Supercars. Hazelwood qualified 13th for the race, and finished in 12th.

=== Trans Am Series ===
Hazelwood made his Trico Trans Am Series debut in 2024 with TFH Racing, driving the No.111 TFH Hire Ford Mustang. Across seven rounds, he recorded seven race wins and two pole positions, and won the series title in his debut season. He secured the championship at the Adelaide 500, ahead of entries from Gary Rogers Motorsport, which has won the series in the previous three seasons.

=== World Time Attack Challenge ===
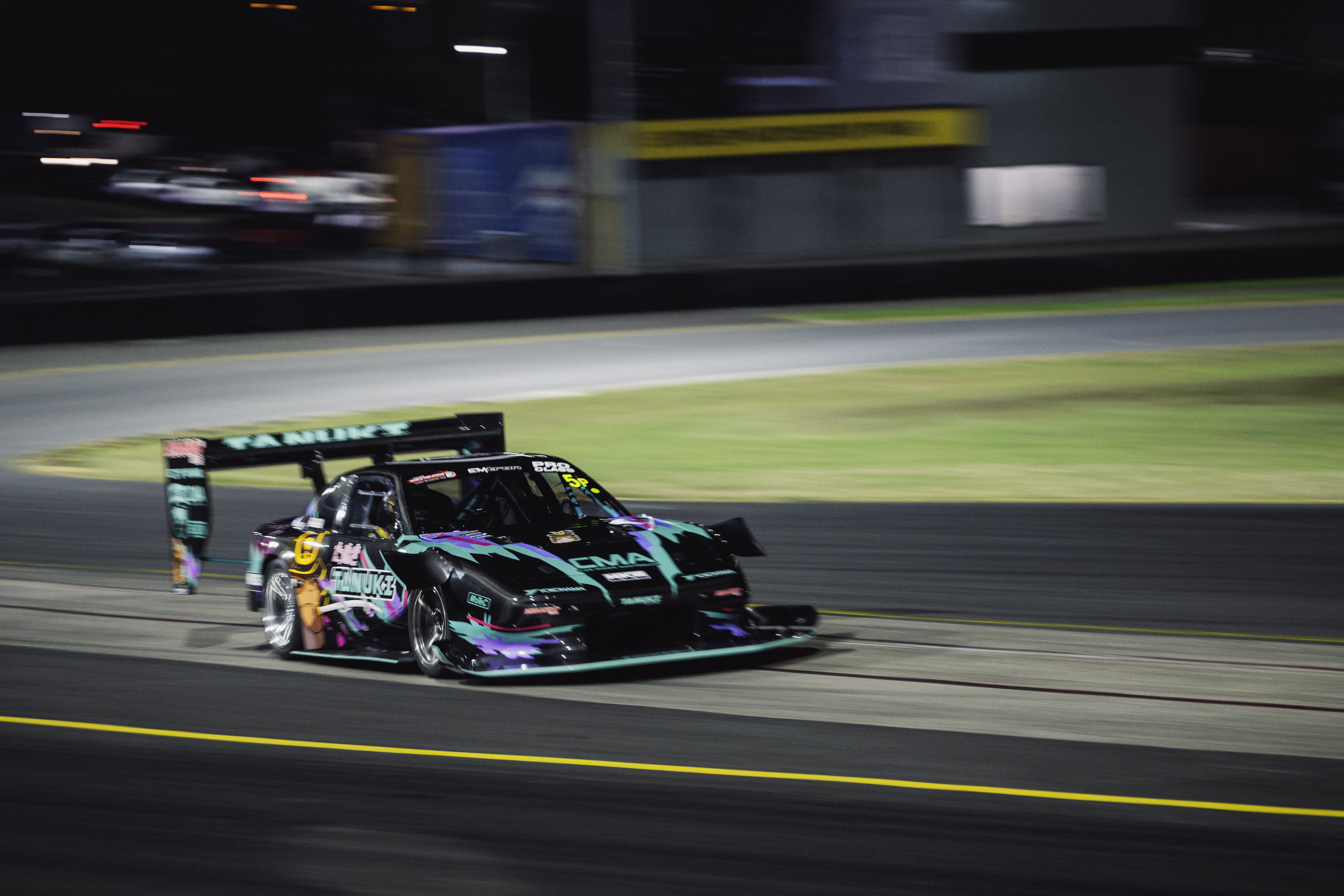
Todd Hazelwood driving the Tanuki Racing Nissan Silvia S13 at Sydney Motorsport Park during the 2025 World Time Attack Challenge

Hazelwood made his debut in time attack racing at the 2025 World Time Attack Challenge with Tanuki Racing. Driving at Sydney Motorsport Park with the #5 Tanuki Racing Nissan Silvia S13 time attack car, he suffered some setbacks on the Thursday practice day when the car presented with gear shift pressure pump issues. The team managed to temporarily mend the car and with limited seat time, Hazelwood managed to post a 1:21.093 on the Friday session which put him firmly at the top of the leaderboard. On Saturday morning, he had already managed to improve on his previous lap time, bringing it down to a 1:19.365. However, during the superlap shootout session at night, he managed to post a personal best time for the Tanuki Racing Nissan Silvia by posting a 1:18.169 and claiming the outright fastest lap time for the 2025 event.

He repeated this in the 2026 event running for Tanuki Racing in the Nissan Silvia S13 again. Winning the rain effected event for the second time setting a 1m19.303s lap.

== Career results ==
=== Karting career ===
Season	Series	Position	Car	Team
2005	Australia Dirt Kart Titles – Juniors	2nd	BRK Gambler	Hazelwood Racing
2006	South Australia Dirt Kart State Titles – Juniors	2nd	BRK Gambler	Belsey Racing
2006	Northern Territory Dirt Kart State Titles – Juniors	1st	BRK Gambler	Belsey Racing
2007	South Australia Dirt Kart State Titles – Juniors	3rd	BRK Blitz	Belsey Racing
2007	Northern Territory Dirt Kart State Titles – Juniors	1st	BRK Blitz	Belsey Racing
2007	Australia Dirt Kart State Titles – Juniors	4th	BRK Blitz	Belsey Racing
2007	Western Australia Dirt Kart State Titles – Juniors	1st	BRK Blitz	Belsey Racing
2008	South Australia Closed State Titles – Junior National Light	2nd	Arrow AX9	Hazelwood Racing
2008	City of Adelaide Titles - Junior National Pro	1st	Arrow AX9	Hazelwood Racing
2008	SA Festival State Cup Champion – Junior National Light	1st	Arrow AX9	Hazelwood Racing
2009	South Australia Closed State Titles – Junior National Light	1st	Arrow AX9	Hazelwood Racing
2009	South Australia Closed State Titles – Junior Clubman	1st	Arrow XE28	Hazelwood Racing
2009	Northern Territory Open State Titles – Junior National Light	2nd	Arrow AX9	Hazelwood Racing
2009	City of Melbourne Titles - Junior National Light	3rd	Arrow AX9	Hazelwood Racing
2009	South Australian Open State Titles – Junior National Light	3rd	Arrow AX9	Hazelwood Racing
2010	Australian National Sprint Kart Championship – Junior National Heavy	4th	Arrow AX8	A1 Engines x Hazelwood Racing
2010	Northern Territory Open State Titles - Junior National Heavy	1st	Arrow AX8	A1 Engines x Hazelwood Racing
2010	Queensland Open State Titles - Junior Clubman	2nd	Arrow X1	A1 Engines x Hazelwood Racing
2010	New South Wales Open State Titles - Junior National Heavy	1st	Arrow AX8	A1 Engines x Hazelwood Racing
2010	South Australian Open State Titles - Junior National Heavy	1st	Arrow AX8	A1 Engines x Hazelwood Racing
2011	Australian National Sprint Kart Championship – Junior National Heavy	5th	Arrow AX8	A1 Engines x Hazelwood Racing
2011	Australian National Sprint Kart Championship – Junior Clubman	5th	Arrow X1	A1 Engines x Hazelwood Racing
2011	Northern Territory Open State Titles - Junior Clubman	1st	Arrow X1	A1 Engines x Hazelwood Racing
2011	South Australian Open State Titles - Junior Clubman	1st	Arrow X1	A1 Engines x Hazelwood Racing

=== Career summary ===
Season	Series	Position	Car	Team
2011	South Australian Formula Ford Series	2nd	Mygale SJ08	BRM
2012	Victorian Formula Ford Championship	4th	Mygale SJ07A – Ford	Minda Motorsport
2013	Australian Drivers' Championship	9th	Dallara F303 Spiess-Opel	R-Tek Motorsport
2013	Australian Formula 3 National Series	2nd	Dallara F303 Spiess-Opel	R-Tek Motorsport
2013	Dunlop V8 Supercar Series	41st	Holden VE Commodore	Minda Motorsport
2014	Dunlop V8 Supercar Series	8th	Ford FG Falcon	Matt Stone Racing
2015	V8 Supercars Dunlop Series	4th	Ford FG Falcon	Matt Stone Racing
2016	Supercars Dunlop Series	3rd	Holden VF Commodore	Matt Stone Racing
2017	Virgin Australia Supercars Championship	47th	Holden VF Commodore	Matt Stone Racing; Tim Blanchard Racing
2017	Dunlop Super2 Series	1st	Holden VF Commodore	Matt Stone Racing
2018	Virgin Australia Supercars Championship	26th	Ford FG X Falcon; Holden VF Commodore	Matt Stone Racing
2019	Virgin Australia Supercars Championship	18th	Holden ZB Commodore	Matt Stone Racing
2020	Virgin Australia Supercars Championship	17th	Holden ZB Commodore	Brad Jones Racing
2021	Repco Supercars Championship	13th	Holden ZB Commodore	Brad Jones Racing
2022	Repco Supercars Championship	18th	Holden ZB Commodore	Matt Stone Racing
2023	Repco Supercars Championship	21st	Ford Mustang GT S650	Blanchard Racing Team
2024	Australian National Trans-Am Series	1st	Ford Mustang	TFH Hire Services
2024	Supercars Championship	25th	Chevrolet Camaro ZL1	Erebus Motorsport
2025	World Time Attack Challenge	1st	Nissan Silvia S13	Tanuki Racing
2025	Australian National Trans-Am Series	1st	Ford Mustang	TFH Hire Services
2025	Supercars Championship	30th	Ford Mustang GT S650	Dick Johnson Racing
2026	World Time Attack Challenge	1st	Nissan Silvia S13	Tanuki Racing
2026	Australian National Trans-Am Series	2nd	Ford Mustang	Todd's Garage
2026	Supercars Championship	25th	Ford Mustang GT S650	Dick Johnson Racing

=== Super2 Series results ===
Super2 Series results
Year	Team	No.	Car	1	2	3	4	5	6	7	8	9	10	11	12	13	14	15	16	17	18	19	20	21	Position	Points
2013	Minda Motorsport	56	Holden VE Commodore	ADE; R1	ADE; R2	BAR; R3	BAR; R4	BAR; R5	TOW; R6	TOW; R7	TOW; R8	QLD; R9	QLD; R10	QLD; R11	WIN; R12	WIN; R13	WIN; R14	BAT; R15	BAT; R16	HOM; R17; DNS	HOM; R18; DNS				NC	0
2014	Matt Stone Racing	35	Ford FG Falcon	ADE; R1; 11	ADE; R2; 9	WIN; R3; 15	WIN; R4; 11	BAR; R5; 5	BAR; R6; 5	TOW; R7; 8	TOW; R8; 13	QLD; R9; Ret	QLD; R10; 10	BAT; R11; 5	HOM; R12; 20	HOM; R13; 4									8th	1131
2015	Matt Stone Racing	35	Ford FG Falcon	ADE; R1; 9	ADE; R2; 8	BAR; R3; 6	BAR; R4; 4	BAR; R5; 8	WIN; R6; 13	WIN; R7; 7	WIN; R8; 8	TOW; R9; 6	TOW; R10; 5	QLD; R11; 6	QLD; R12; 7	QLD; R13; 9	BAT; R14; 5	HOM; R15; 3	HOM; R16; 6						4th	1404
2016	Matt Stone Racing	35	Holden VF Commodore	ADE; R1; 22	ADE; R2; 4	PHI; R3; 4	PHI; R4; 15	PHI; R5; 7	BAR; R6; 8	BAR; R7; 5	BAR; R8; 3	TOW; R9; 3	TOW; R10; 3	SAN; R11; 7	SAN; R12; Ret	SAN; R13; 4	BAT; R14; 6	HOM; R15; 4	HOM; R16; 3						3rd	1418
2017	Matt Stone Racing	35	Holden VF Commodore	ADE; R1; 2	ADE; R2; 2	ADE; R3; 1	SYM; R4; 2	SYM; R5; 2	SYM; R6; 1	SYM; R7; 3	PHI; R8; 5	PHI; R9; 5	PHI; R10; 7	PHI; R11; 4	TOW; R12; 1	TOW; R13; 1	SYD; R14; 7	SYD; R15; 9	SYD; R16; 2	SYD; R17; 8	SAN; R18; 3	SAN; R19; 7	NEW; R20; 1	NEW; R21; 1	1st	1808

=== Supercars Championship results ===
Supercars results
Year	Team	No.	Car	1	2	3	4	5	6	7	8	9	10	11	12	13	14	15	16	17	18	19	20	21	22	23	24	25	26	27	28	29	30	31	32	33	34	35	36	37	Position	Points
2017	Tim Blanchard Racing	21	Holden VF Commodore	ADE; R1	ADE; R2	SYM; R3	SYM; R4	PHI; R5	PHI; R6	BAR; R7	BAR; R8	WIN; R9; PO	WIN; R10; PO	HID; R11	HID; R12	TOW; R13	TOW; R14	QLD; R15; PO	QLD; R16; PO	SMP; R17	SMP; R18	SAN; Q 22	SAN; R19; DNS	BAT; R20; 12	SUR; R21; 15	SUR; R22; 20	PUK; R23	PUK; R24	NEW; R25	NEW; R26											47th	333
2017	Matt Stone Racing	35	Holden VF Commodore															QLD; R15; 22	QLD; R16; 18																						47th	333
2018	Matt Stone Racing	35	Ford FG X Falcon	ADE; R1; 22	ADE; R2; 21	MEL; R3; 22	MEL; R4; Ret	MEL; R5; 18	MEL; R6; 19	SYM; R7; 22	SYM; R8; 20	PHI; R9; 23	PHI; R10; 24	BAR; R11; 22	BAR; R12; 25	WIN; R13; 21	WIN; R14; 25	HID; R15; 25	HID; R16; 24	TOW; R17; 20	TOW; R18; 23	QLD; R19; 27	QLD; R20; 23	SMP; R21; 24																	26th	1201
2018	Matt Stone Racing	35	Holden VF Commodore																						BEN; R22; 26	BEN; R23; 25	SAN; QR; 23	SAN; R24; 21	BAT; R25; 20	SUR; R26; 20	SUR; R27; C	PUK; R28; 24	PUK; R29; 25	NEW; R30; 13	NEW; R31; 21						26th	1201
2019	Matt Stone Racing	35	Holden ZB Commodore	ADE; R1; 12	ADE; R2; 10	MEL; R3; 23	MEL; R4; 17	MEL; R5; 14	MEL; R6; 13	SYM; R7; 14	SYM; R8; 18	PHI; R9; 11	PHI; R10; 16	BAR; R11; 23	BAR; R12; 14	WIN; R13; 19	WIN; R14; 15	HID; R15; 18	HID; R16; 13	TOW; R17; 14	TOW; R18; 16	QLD; R19; 19	QLD; R20; 13	BEN; R21; Ret	BEN; R22; 14	PUK; R23; 14	PUK; R24; 5	BAT; R25; Ret	SUR; R26; 20	SUR; R27; 20	SAN; QR; 11	SAN; R28; 20	NEW; R29; 18	NEW; R30; 10							18th	1609
2020	Brad Jones Racing	14	Holden ZB Commodore	ADE; R1; 13	ADE; R2; 14	MEL; R3; C	MEL; R4; C	MEL; R5; C	MEL; R6; C	SMP1; R7; 11	SMP1; R8; 18	SMP1; R9; 8	SMP2; R10; 13	SMP2; R11; 20	SMP2; R12; 3	HID1; R13; 18	HID1; R14; 20	HID1; R15; 20	HID2; R16; 16	HID2; R17; 15	HID2; R18; 15	TOW1; R19; Ret	TOW1; R20; 13	TOW1; R21; 5	TOW2; R22; 12	TOW2; R23; 14	TOW2; R24; 6	BEN1; R25; 24	BEN1; R26; 12	BEN1; R27; 10	BEN2; R28; 19	BEN2; R29; 11	BEN2; R30; 7	BAT; R31; Ret							17th	1181
2021	Brad Jones Racing	14	Holden ZB Commodore	BAT1; R1; 10	BAT1; R2; 18	SAN; R3; 14	SAN; R4; 14	SAN; R5; 8	SYM; R6; 14	SYM; R7; 14	SYM; R8; 16	BEN; R9; 15	BEN; R10; 19	BEN; R11; 13	HID; R12; Ret	HID; R13; 14	HID; R14; 21	TOW1; R15; 22	TOW1; R16; 7	TOW2; R17; 9	TOW2; R18; 5	TOW2; R19; 4	SMP1; R20; 14	SMP1; R21; 10	SMP1; R22; 23	SMP2; R23; 5	SMP2; R24; 26	SMP2; R25; 9	SMP3; R26; 12	SMP3; R27; 13	SMP3; R28; 5	SMP4; R29; 14	SMP4; R30; C	BAT2; R31; 8							13th	1599
2022	Matt Stone Racing	35	Holden ZB Commodore	SMP; R1; 14	SMP; R2; 13	SYM; R3; 10	SYM; R4; 10	SYM; R5; 5	MEL; R6; 19	MEL; R7; 5	MEL; R8; 14	MEL; R9; 14	BAR; R10; 9	BAR; R11; 10	BAR; R12; 8	WIN; R13; 23	WIN; R14; 17	WIN; R15; 18	HID; R16; 16	HID; R17; 24	HID; R18; 23	TOW; R19; 21	TOW; R20; 15	BEN; R21; 18	BEN; R22; 17	BEN; R23; 21	SAN; R24; 21	SAN; R25; 24	SAN; R26; 24	PUK; R27; 15	PUK; R28; 20	PUK; R29; 23	BAT; R30; 20	SUR; R31; 18	SUR; R32; Ret	ADE; R33; Ret	ADE; R34; 21				18th	1345
2023	Blanchard Racing Team	3	Ford Mustang S650	NEW; R1; 14	NEW; R2; 15	MEL; R3; DSQ	MEL; R4; 20	MEL; R5; 15	MEL; R6; 9	BAR; R7; 4	BAR; R8; 7	BAR; R9; 14	SYM; R10; 20	SYM; R11; 19	SYM; R12; 24	HID; R13; 17	HID; R14; 14	HID; R15; 10	TOW; R16; 23	TOW; R17; Ret	SMP; R18; 18	SMP; R19; 21	BEN; R20; 12	BEN; R21; 16	BEN; R22; 16	SAN; R23; 17	BAT; R24; Ret	SUR; R25; 19	SUR; R26; 18	ADE; R27; 12	ADE; R28; 11										21st	1221
2024	Erebus Motorsport	99	Chevrolet Camaro ZL1	BAT1; R1; 11	BAT1; R2; 13	MEL; R3; 9	MEL; R4; 9	MEL; R5; 6	MEL; R6; 15	TAU; R7	TAU; R8	BAR; R9	BAR; R10	HID; R11	HID; R12	TOW; R13	TOW; R14	SMP; R15	SMP; R16	BEN; R17	BEN; R18	SAN; R19; Ret	BAT; R20; 1	SUR; R21	SUR; R22	ADE; R23	ADE; R24														25th	603
2025	Dick Johnson Racing	38	Ford Mustang S650	SYD; R1	SYD; R2	SYD; R3	MEL; R4	MEL; R5	MEL; R6	MEL; R7	TAU; R8	TAU; R9	TAU; R10	SYM; R11	SYM; R12	SYM; R13	BAR; R14	BAR; R15	BAR; R16	HID; R17	HID; R18	HID; R19	TOW; R20	TOW; R21	TOW; R22	QLD; R23	QLD; R24	QLD; R25	BEN; R26; 1	BAT; R27; 18	SUR; R28	SUR; R29	SAN; R30	SAN; R31	ADE; R32	ADE; R33	ADE; R34				30th	373
2026	Dick Johnson Racing	17	Ford Mustang S650	SMP; R1	SMP; R2	SMP; R3	MEL; R4	MEL; R5	MEL; R6	MEL; R7	TAU; R8	TAU; R9	TAU; R10	CHR; R11	CHR; R12	CHR; R13	SYM; R14	SYM; R15	SYM; R16	BAR; R17	BAR; R18	BAR; R19	HID; R20	HID; R21	HID; R22; 12	TOW; R23	TOW; R24	TOW; R25	QLD; R26	QLD; R27	QLD; R28	BEN; R29; 16	BAT; R30; 1	SUR; R31	SUR; R32	SAN; R33	SAN; R34	ADE; R35	ADE; R36	ADE; R37	25th	441

=== Bathurst 1000 results ===
Year	Team	Car	Co-driver	Position	Laps
2017	Tim Blanchard Racing	Holden Commodore VF	(Australia) Tim Blanchard	12th	160
2018	Matt Stone Racing	Holden Commodore VF	(Australia) Bryce Fullwood	20th	159
2019	Matt Stone Racing	Holden Commodore ZB	(Australia) Jack Smith	DNF	98
2020	Brad Jones Racing	Holden Commodore ZB	(Australia) Jordan Boys	DNF	50
2021	Brad Jones Racing	Holden Commodore ZB	(Australia) Dean Fiore	8th	161
2022	Matt Stone Racing	Holden Commodore ZB	(Australia) Jayden Ojeda	20th	159
2023	Blanchard Racing Team	Ford Mustang S650	(Australia) Tim Blanchard	DNF	156
2024	Erebus Motorsport	Chevrolet Camaro Mk.6	(Australia) Brodie Kostecki	1st	161
2025	Dick Johnson Racing	Ford Mustang S650	(Australia) Brodie Kostecki	18th	155
2026	Dick Johnson Racing	Ford Mustang S650	(Australia) Brodie Kostecki	1st	161

=== The Bend 500 Results ===
Year	Team	Car	Co-driver	Position	Laps
2025	Dick Johnson Racing	Ford Mustang S650	(Australia) Brodie Kostecki	1st	102

=== Trams Am Series results ===
Trans Am Series results
Year	Team	Car	1	2	3	4	5	6	7	8	9	10	11	12	13	14	15	16	17	18	19	20	21	22	23	Position	Points
2024	TFH Racing	Ford Mustang	SAN; R1; 6	SAN; R2; 3	SAN; R3; 13	SYM; R4; 4	SYM; R5; 4	SYM; R6; 3	SYM; R7; 4	PHI; R8; 6	PHI; R9; 5	PHI; R10; 2	BEN; R11; 2	BEN; R12; 1	BEN; R13; 1	BEN; R14; 4	QLD; R15; 2	QLD; R16; 1	QLD; R17; 1	QLD; R18; 1	BAT; R19; 4	BAT; R20; 3	ADE; R21; 1	ADE; R22; 1	ADE; R23; 2	1st	823
2025	TFH Racing	Ford Mustang	SYM; R1; 1	SYM; R2; 1	SYM; R3; 1	SYM; R4; 1	BAT; R5; 2	BAT; R6; 1	HID; R7; 1	HID; R8; 12	HID; R9; 2	SAN; R10; 4	SAN; R11; 1	SAN; R12; 2	BEN; R13; 2	BEN; R14; 2	BEN; R15; 9	MAL; R16; 6	MAL; R17; 5	MAL; R18; 4	ADE; R19; 1	ADE; R20; 1	ADE; R21; 1			1st	823
2026	Todd's Garage	Ford Mustang	BAT; R1; 2	BAT; R2; 2	BAT; R3; 15	HID; R1; 4	HID; R2; 3	HID; R3; 4	WAN; R1; 1	WAN; R2; 1	WAN; R3; Ret	QLD; R1; 1	QLD; R2; 14	QLD; R3; 6	BEN; R1; 2	BEN; R2; 2	BEN; R3; 4	SAN; R1; 1	SAN; R2; 3	SAN; R3; Ret	SAN; R4; 1	SAN; R5; 1	SAN; R6; 1			2nd	387

=== Complete Bathurst 12 Hour results ===
Year	Team	Co-drivers	Car	Class	Laps	Overall position	Class position
2019	(Australia) Matt Stone Racing	(Australia) Roger Lago (Australia) David Russell	Audi R8 LMS	APA	308	10th	2nd

=== Complete Bathurst 6 Hour results ===
Year	Team	Co-drivers	Car	Class	Laps	Pos.	Class pos.
2023	(Australia) OnTrack Motorsport	(Australia) Robert Rubis	BMW 130i E87	C	111	18th	1st
2025	(Australia) MLB	(Australia) Aaron Seton (Australia) Jason Gomersall	Ford Mustang Mach 1	A2	122	3rd	1st

Sporting positions
Preceded by Garry Jacobson	Dunlop Super2 Series; Champion; 2017	Succeeded by Chris Pither
Preceded by Shane van Gisbergen; Richie Stanaway	Winner of the Bathurst 1000; 2024; With: Brodie Kostecki	Succeeded by Matt Payne; Garth Tander
Preceded by James Moffat	Winner of the Australian National Trans-Am Series; 2024 & 2025	Succeeded by Incumbent
Awards and achievements
Preceded by Scott McLaughlin	Mike Kable Young Gun Award; 2014	Succeeded by Ashley Walsh
