= 2020 Adelaide 500 =

2020 race of the Supercars Championship

(South Australia) 2020 Adelaide 500
Event Information
- Round 1 of 8 in the 2020 Supercars Championship
- Layout of the Adelaide Street Circuit
- Date: 20–23 February 2020
- Location: Adelaide, South Australia
- Venue: Adelaide Street Circuit
- Weather: Fine

Results
Race 1
Distance	78 laps	251.160 km
Pole position	(Australia) Jamie Whincup; Triple Eight Race Engineering	1:19.4793
Winner	(Australia) Jamie Whincup; Triple Eight Race Engineering	1:47:22.9297
Race 2
Distance	78 laps	251.160 km
Pole position	(New Zealand) Shane van Gisbergen; Triple Eight Race Engineering	1:19.8101
Winner	(New Zealand) Scott McLaughlin; DJR Team Penske	1:52:12.3963

The 2020 Adelaide 500 (known for commercial reasons as the 2020 Superloop Adelaide 500) is a motor racing event for the Supercars Championship held on Thursday 20 February through to Sunday 23 February 2020. The event was held at the Adelaide Street Circuit in Adelaide, South Australia, and marked the twenty-second running of the Adelaide 500. It was the first event of fourteen in the 2020 Supercars Championship and consisted of two races of 250 kilometres.

The race was supported by the opening rounds of the Super2 Series, Porsche Carrera Cup Australia, Touring Car Masters, Boost Mobile Super Trucks and National TA2 Series.

== Results ==
=== Practice ===
Session	Day	Fastest lap					
Session	Day	No.	Driver	Team	Car	Time	Ref.
Practice 1	Thursday	9	(Australia) David Reynolds	Erebus Motorsport	Holden Commodore ZB	1:20.6864	
Practice 2	Friday	97	(New Zealand) Shane van Gisbergen	Triple Eight Race Engineering	Holden Commodore ZB	1:19.8079	
Practice 3	Friday	25	(Australia) Chaz Mostert	Walkinshaw Andretti United	Holden Commodore ZB	1:19.2412	

=== Race 1 ===
==== Qualifying ====
Pos.	No.	Driver	Team	Car	Q1	Q2	Shootout
1	88	(Australia) Jamie Whincup	Triple Eight Race Engineering	Holden Commodore ZB		1:19.8674	1:19.4793
2	9	(Australia) David Reynolds	Erebus Motorsport	Holden Commodore ZB		1:19.7200	1:19.4841
3	23	(Australia) Will Davison	23Red Racing	Ford Mustang GT		1:19.7351	1:19.4931
4	25	(Australia) Chaz Mostert	Walkinshaw Andretti United	Holden Commodore ZB		1:19.7930	1:19.5502
5	6	(Australia) Cam Waters	Tickford Racing	Ford Mustang GT		1:19.5396	1:19.5784
6	97	(New Zealand) Shane van Gisbergen	Triple Eight Race Engineering	Holden Commodore ZB		1:19.4462	1:19.6832
7	17	(New Zealand) Scott McLaughlin	DJR Team Penske	Ford Mustang GT		1:19.6220	1:19.8490
8	99	(Australia) Anton de Pasquale	Erebus Motorsport	Holden Commodore ZB		1:20.0366	1:19.9582
9	18	(Australia) Mark Winterbottom	Team 18	Holden Commodore ZB		1:19.8652	1:20.1568
10	8	(Australia) Nick Percat	Brad Jones Racing	Holden Commodore ZB	1:20.3369	1:19.7660	1:20.3028
11	12	(New Zealand) Fabian Coulthard	DJR Team Penske	Ford Mustang GT		1:20.0922	
12	5	(Australia) Lee Holdsworth	Tickford Racing	Ford Mustang GT	1:20.4173	1:20.1081	
13	7	(New Zealand) Andre Heimgartner	Kelly Racing	Ford Mustang GT	1:20.2442	1:20.1463	
14	55	(Australia) Jack Le Brocq	Tickford Racing	Ford Mustang GT	1:20.5316	no time	
15	20	(Australia) Scott Pye	Team 18	Holden Commodore ZB	1:20.6110		
16	15	(Australia) Rick Kelly	Kelly Racing	Ford Mustang GT	1:20.7675		
17	3	(Australia) Macauley Jones	Tim Blanchard Racing	Holden Commodore ZB	1:20.8678		
18	2	(Australia) Bryce Fullwood	Walkinshaw Andretti United	Holden Commodore ZB	1:20.7890		
19	35	(Australia) Garry Jacobson	Matt Stone Racing	Holden Commodore ZB	1:20.8776		
20	34	(Australia) Zane Goddard	Matt Stone Racing	Holden Commodore ZB	1:20.9248		
21	19	(Australia) James Courtney	Team Sydney by Tekno	Holden Commodore ZB	1:21.1769		
22	4	(Australia) Jack Smith	Brad Jones Racing	Holden Commodore ZB	1:21.2447		
23	14	(Australia) Todd Hazelwood	Brad Jones Racing	Holden Commodore ZB	1:21.2542		
24	22	(New Zealand) Chris Pither	Team Sydney by Tekno	Holden Commodore ZB	1:21.3445		

==== Race ====
Pos	No.	Driver	Team	Car	Laps	Time / Retired	Grid	Points
1	88	(Australia) Jamie Whincup	Triple Eight Race Engineering	Holden Commodore ZB	78	1:47:22.9297	1	150
2	17	(New Zealand) Scott McLaughlin	DJR Team Penske	Ford Mustang GT	78	+5.2378	7	138
3	97	(New Zealand) Shane van Gisbergen	Triple Eight Race Engineering	Holden Commodore ZB	78	+6.9226	6	129
4	9	(Australia) David Reynolds	Erebus Motorsport	Holden Commodore ZB	78	+13.3384	2	120
5	23	(Australia) Will Davison	23Red Racing	Ford Mustang GT	78	+15.2634	3	111
6	6	(Australia) Cam Waters	Tickford Racing	Ford Mustang GT	78	+16.8933	5	102
7	25	(Australia) Chaz Mostert	Walkinshaw Andretti United	Holden Commodore ZB	78	+20.5607	4	96
8	18	(Australia) Mark Winterbottom	Team 18	Holden Commodore ZB	78	+27.3343	9	90
9	15	(Australia) Rick Kelly	Kelly Racing	Ford Mustang GT	78	+32.2785	16	84
10	12	(New Zealand) Fabian Coulthard	DJR Team Penske	Ford Mustang GT	78	+32.9784	11	78
11	7	(New Zealand) Andre Heimgartner	Kelly Racing	Ford Mustang GT	78	+34.5175	13	72
12	5	(Australia) Lee Holdsworth	Tickford Racing	Ford Mustang GT	78	+35.0511	12	69
13	14	(Australia) Todd Hazelwood	Brad Jones Racing	Holden Commodore ZB	78	+37.1476	23	66
14	99	(Australia) Anton de Pasquale	Erebus Motorsport	Holden Commodore ZB	78	+50.8034	8	63
15	20	(Australia) Scott Pye	Team 18	Holden Commodore ZB	78	+1:02.7799	15	60
16	55	(Australia) Jack Le Brocq	Tickford Racing	Ford Mustang GT	78	+1:09.0179	14	57
17	3	(Australia) Macauley Jones	Tim Blanchard Racing	Holden Commodore ZB	78	+1:09.6023	17	54
18	34	(Australia) Zane Goddard	Matt Stone Racing	Holden Commodore ZB	77	+1 lap	20	51
19	22	(New Zealand) Chris Pither	Team Sydney by Tekno	Holden Commodore ZB	77	+1 lap	24	48
20	4	(Australia) Jack Smith	Brad Jones Racing	Holden Commodore ZB	76	+2 laps	22	45
21	2	(Australia) Bryce Fullwood	Walkinshaw Andretti United	Holden Commodore ZB	73	+5 laps	18	42
22	8	(Australia) Nick Percat	Brad Jones Racing	Holden Commodore ZB	65	+13 laps	10	39
Ret	19	(Australia) James Courtney	Team Sydney by Tekno	Holden Commodore ZB	16	Crash damage	21	
Ret	35	(Australia) Garry Jacobson	Matt Stone Racing	Holden Commodore ZB	5	Crash damage	19	

=== Race 2 ===
==== Qualifying ====
Pos.	No.	Driver	Team	Car	Q1	Q2	Shootout
1	97	(New Zealand) Shane van Gisbergen	Triple Eight Race Engineering	Holden Commodore ZB		1:20.0054	1:19.8101
2	17	(New Zealand) Scott McLaughlin	DJR Team Penske	Ford Mustang GT		1:19.9649	1:19.8484
3	6	(Australia) Cam Waters	Tickford Racing	Ford Mustang GT		1:19.8799	1:19.9502
4	23	(Australia) Will Davison	23Red Racing	Ford Mustang GT		1:19.9929	1:20.0336
5	25	(Australia) Chaz Mostert	Walkinshaw Andretti United	Holden Commodore ZB		1:20.1343	1:20.1131
6	12	(New Zealand) Fabian Coulthard	DJR Team Penske	Ford Mustang GT	1:20.5758	1:20.2517	1:20.1322
7	88	(Australia) Jamie Whincup	Triple Eight Race Engineering	Holden Commodore ZB		1:19.8363	1:20.2372
8	5	(Australia) Lee Holdsworth	Tickford Racing	Ford Mustang GT	1:20.4348	1:20.0938	1:20.3071
9	15	(Australia) Rick Kelly	Kelly Racing	Ford Mustang GT	1:20.6643	1:20.3394	1:20.3655
10	99	(Australia) Anton de Pasquale	Erebus Motorsport	Holden Commodore ZB		1:20.4356	1:20.5160
11	55	(Australia) Jack Le Brocq	Tickford Racing	Ford Mustang GT	1:20.6479	1:20.7792	
12	18	(Australia) Mark Winterbottom	Team 18	Holden Commodore ZB		1:20.8027	
13	8	(Australia) Nick Percat	Brad Jones Racing	Holden Commodore ZB		1:20.8803	
14	9	(Australia) David Reynolds	Erebus Motorsport	Holden Commodore ZB		no time	
15	14	(Australia) Todd Hazelwood	Brad Jones Racing	Holden Commodore ZB	1:20.6711		
16	20	(Australia) Scott Pye	Team 18	Holden Commodore ZB	1:20.7009		
17	2	(Australia) Bryce Fullwood	Walkinshaw Andretti United	Holden Commodore ZB	1:20.9251		
18	3	(Australia) Macauley Jones	Tim Blanchard Racing	Holden Commodore ZB	1:21.0040		
19	7	(New Zealand) Andre Heimgartner	Kelly Racing	Ford Mustang GT	1:21.0949		
20	35	(Australia) Garry Jacobson	Matt Stone Racing	Holden Commodore ZB	1:21.0986		
21	34	(Australia) Zane Goddard	Matt Stone Racing	Holden Commodore ZB	1:21.1765		
22	19	(Australia) James Courtney	Team Sydney by Tekno	Holden Commodore ZB	1:21.3262		
23	22	(New Zealand) Chris Pither	Team Sydney by Tekno	Holden Commodore ZB	1:21.6569		
24	4	(Australia) Jack Smith	Brad Jones Racing	Holden Commodore ZB	no time		

==== Race ====
Pos	No.	Driver	Team	Car	Laps	Time / Retired	Grid	Points
1	17	(New Zealand) Scott McLaughlin	DJR Team Penske	Ford Mustang GT	78	1:52:12.3963	2	150
2	25	(Australia) Chaz Mostert	Walkinshaw Andretti United	Holden Commodore ZB	78	+10.3068	5	138
3	6	(Australia) Cam Waters	Tickford Racing	Ford Mustang GT	78	+14.3097	3	129
4	23	(Australia) Will Davison	23Red Racing	Ford Mustang GT	78	+21.0459	4	120
5	88	(Australia) Jamie Whincup	Triple Eight Race Engineering	Holden Commodore ZB	78	+24.1866	7	111
6	5	(Australia) Lee Holdsworth	Tickford Racing	Ford Mustang GT	78	+24.7477	8	102
7	8	(Australia) Nick Percat	Brad Jones Racing	Holden Commodore ZB	78	+33.0468	13	96
8	9	(Australia) David Reynolds	Erebus Motorsport	Holden Commodore ZB	78	+34.1673	14	90
9	12	(New Zealand) Fabian Coulthard	DJR Team Penske	Ford Mustang GT	78	+35.0661	6	84
10	7	(New Zealand) Andre Heimgartner	Kelly Racing	Ford Mustang GT	78	+35.6501	19	78
11	18	(Australia) Mark Winterbottom	Team 18	Holden Commodore ZB	78	+46.5674	12	72
12	55	(Australia) Jack Le Brocq	Tickford Racing	Ford Mustang GT	78	+51.2202	11	69
13	15	(Australia) Rick Kelly	Kelly Racing	Ford Mustang GT	78	+55.3084	9	66
14	14	(Australia) Todd Hazelwood	Brad Jones Racing	Holden Commodore ZB	78	+1:01.6673	15	63
15	19	(Australia) James Courtney	Team Sydney by Tekno	Holden Commodore ZB	78	+1:05.1407	22	60
16	34	(Australia) Zane Goddard	Matt Stone Racing	Holden Commodore ZB	77	+1 lap	21	57
17	2	(Australia) Bryce Fullwood	Walkinshaw Andretti United	Holden Commodore ZB	77	+1 lap	17	54
18	4	(Australia) Jack Smith	Brad Jones Racing	Holden Commodore ZB	76	+2 laps	24	51
19	3	(Australia) Macauley Jones	Tim Blanchard Racing	Holden Commodore ZB	75	+3 laps	18	48
20	35	(Australia) Garry Jacobson	Matt Stone Racing	Holden Commodore ZB	72	+6 laps	20	45
Ret	97	(New Zealand) Shane van Gisbergen	Triple Eight Race Engineering	Holden Commodore ZB	74	Suspension	1	
Ret	22	(New Zealand) Chris Pither	Team Sydney by Tekno	Holden Commodore ZB	11	Crash damage	23	
Ret	20	(Australia) Scott Pye	Team 18	Holden Commodore ZB	1	Crash	16	
Ret	99	(Australia) Anton de Pasquale	Erebus Motorsport	Holden Commodore ZB	1	Crash	10	
