= 2018 Winton SuperSprint =

2018 V8 Supercar championship race

(Victoria (state)) 2018 Winton SuperSprint
Event Information
- Round 6 of 16 in the 2018 Supercars Championship
- Date: 18–20 May 2018
- Location: Benalla, Victoria
- Venue: Winton Motor Raceway

Results
Race 1
Distance	40 laps	119.735 km
Pole position	(New Zealand) Scott McLaughlin; DJR Team Penske	1:19.1136
Winner	(Australia) Rick Kelly; Nissan Motorsport	57:29.0426
Race 2
Distance	67 laps	200.556 km
Pole position	(New Zealand) Scott McLaughlin; DJR Team Penske	1:19.0199
Winner	(New Zealand) Fabian Coulthard; DJR Team Penske	1:32:22.9780

The 2018 Winton SuperSprint was a motor racing event for the Supercars Championship, held on 18-20 May 2018. The event was held at the Winton Motor Raceway near Benalla, Victoria and consisted of two races, 120 and 200 kilometres in length. It was the sixth round of sixteen in the 2018 Supercars Championship and hosted Races 13 and 14 of the season.

== Results ==
=== Practice ===
Practice summary
Session	Day	Fastest lap				
Session	Day	No.	Driver	Team	Car	Time
Practice 1	Friday	12	(New Zealand) Fabian Coulthard	DJR Team Penske	Ford Falcon FG X	1:32.0340
Practice 2	Friday	23	(Australia) Michael Caruso	Nissan Motorsport	Nissan Altima L33	1:19.7105
Practice 3	Saturday	17	(New Zealand) Scott McLaughlin	DJR Team Penske	Ford Falcon FG X	1:19.4601

=== Race 13 ===
==== Qualifying ====
Pos.	No.	Driver	Team	Car	Time	Gap	Grid
1	17	(New Zealand) Scott McLaughlin	DJR Team Penske	Ford Falcon FG X	1:19.1136		1
2	12	(New Zealand) Fabian Coulthard	DJR Team Penske	Ford Falcon FG X	1:19.2419	+0.1283	2
3	23	(Australia) Michael Caruso	Nissan Motorsport	Nissan Altima L33	1:19.3439	+0.2303	3
4	15	(Australia) Rick Kelly	Nissan Motorsport	Nissan Altima L33	1:19.3875	+0.2739	4
5	2	(Australia) Scott Pye	Walkinshaw Andretti United	Holden Commodore ZB	1:19.3974	+0.2838	5
6	14	(Australia) Tim Slade	Brad Jones Racing	Holden Commodore ZB	1:19.4935	+0.3799	6
7	5	(Australia) Mark Winterbottom	Tickford Racing	Ford Falcon FG X	1:19.5019	+0.3883	7
8	230	(Australia) Will Davison	23Red Racing	Ford Falcon FG X	1:19.5036	+0.3900	8
9	99	(Australia) Anton de Pasquale	Erebus Motorsport	Holden Commodore ZB	1:19.5171	+0.4035	9
10	8	(Australia) Nick Percat	Brad Jones Racing	Holden Commodore ZB	1:19.5274	+0.4138	10
11	1	(Australia) Jamie Whincup	Triple Eight Race Engineering	Holden Commodore ZB	1:19.5415	+0.4279	11
12	56	(New Zealand) Richie Stanaway	Tickford Racing	Ford Falcon FG X	1:19.5531	+0.4395	12
13	25	(Australia) James Courtney	Walkinshaw Andretti United	Holden Commodore ZB	1:19.5609	+0.4473	13
14	97	(New Zealand) Shane van Gisbergen	Triple Eight Race Engineering	Holden Commodore ZB	1:19.5703	+0.4567	14
15	6	(Australia) Cam Waters	Tickford Racing	Ford Falcon FG X	1:19.5826	+0.4690	15
16	55	(Australia) Chaz Mostert	Tickford Racing	Ford Falcon FG X	1:19.6025	+0.4889	16
17	9	(Australia) David Reynolds	Erebus Motorsport	Holden Commodore ZB	1:19.6173	+0.5037	17
18	19	(Australia) Jack Le Brocq	Tekno Autosports	Holden Commodore ZB	1:19.6793	+0.5657	18
19	21	(Australia) Tim Blanchard	Tim Blanchard Racing	Holden Commodore ZB	1:19.6902	+0.5766	19
20	33	(Australia) Garth Tander	Garry Rogers Motorsport	Holden Commodore ZB	1:19.7428	+0.6292	20
21	400	(Australia) Lee Holdsworth	Team 18	Holden Commodore ZB	1:19.7606	+0.6470	21
22	34	(Australia) James Golding	Garry Rogers Motorsport	Holden Commodore ZB	1:19.8178	+0.7042	22
23	78	(Switzerland) Simona de Silvestro	Nissan Motorsport	Nissan Altima L33	1:19.8238	+0.7102	23
24	888	(Australia) Craig Lowndes	Triple Eight Race Engineering	Holden Commodore ZB	1:19.9689	+0.8553	24
25	7	(New Zealand) Andre Heimgartner	Nissan Motorsport	Nissan Altima L33	1:20.0566	+0.9430	25
26	35	(Australia) Todd Hazelwood	Matt Stone Racing	Ford Falcon FG X	1:20.2987	+1.1851	26

==== Race ====
Pos	No.	Driver	Team	Car	Laps	Time / Retired	Grid	Points
1	15	(Australia) Rick Kelly	Nissan Motorsport	Nissan Altima L33	40	57:29.0436	4	150
2	2	(Australia) Scott Pye	Walkinshaw Andretti United	Holden Commodore ZB	40	+0.5310	5	138
3	97	(New Zealand) Shane van Gisbergen	Triple Eight Race Engineering	Holden Commodore ZB	40	+1.1191	14	129
4	12	(New Zealand) Fabian Coulthard	DJR Team Penske	Ford Falcon FG X	40	+1.5283	2	120
5	17	(New Zealand) Scott McLaughlin	DJR Team Penske	Ford Falcon FG X	40	+2.2005	1	111
6	23	(Australia) Michael Caruso	Nissan Motorsport	Nissan Altima L33	40	+3.7724	3	102
7	14	(Australia) Tim Slade	Brad Jones Racing	Holden Commodore ZB	40	+4.4943	6	96
8	33	(Australia) Garth Tander	Garry Rogers Motorsport	Holden Commodore ZB	40	+4.9210	20	90
9	25	(Australia) James Courtney	Walkinshaw Andretti United	Holden Commodore ZB	40	+6.2835	13	84
10	5	(Australia) Mark Winterbottom	Tickford Racing	Ford Falcon FG X	40	+7.8034	7	78
11	230	(Australia) Will Davison	23Red Racing	Ford Falcon FG X	40	+8.0984	8	72
12	99	(Australia) Anton de Pasquale	Erebus Motorsport	Holden Commodore ZB	40	+9.1151	9	69
13	888	(Australia) Craig Lowndes	Triple Eight Race Engineering	Holden Commodore ZB	40	+9.5665	24	66
14	55	(Australia) Chaz Mostert	Tickford Racing	Ford Falcon FG X	40	+10.5087	16	63
15	19	(Australia) Jack Le Brocq	Tekno Autosports	Holden Commodore ZB	40	+10.6859	18	60
16	7	(New Zealand) Andre Heimgartner	Nissan Motorsport	Nissan Altima L33	40	+13.1818	25	57
17	1	(Australia) Jamie Whincup	Triple Eight Race Engineering	Holden Commodore ZB	40	+14.4611	11	54
18	8	(Australia) Nick Percat	Brad Jones Racing	Holden Commodore ZB	40	+14.6535	10	51
19	35	(Australia) Todd Hazelwood	Matt Stone Racing	Ford Falcon FG X	40	+15.0741	26	48
20	34	(Australia) James Golding	Garry Rogers Motorsport	Holden Commodore ZB	40	+15.4148	26	45
21	56	(Australia) Richie Stanaway	Tickford Racing	Ford Falcon FG X	40	+30.7630	12	42
22	78	(Switzerland) Simona de Silvestro	Nissan Motorsport	Nissan Altima L33	40	+33.9746^{1}	23	39
23	400	(Australia) Lee Holdsworth	Team 18	Holden Commodore ZB	39	+1 lap	21	36
24	21	(Australia) Tim Blanchard	Tim Blanchard Racing	Holden Commodore ZB	38	+2 laps	19	33
25	9	(Australia) David Reynolds	Erebus Motorsport	Holden Commodore ZB	34	+6 laps	17	30
NC	6	(Australia) Cam Waters	Tickford Racing	Ford Falcon FG X	28	Retirement	15	
Fastest lap: Shane van Gisbergen (Triple Eight Race Engineering) 1:19.9610 (on lap 29)

Notes

- ^1– Simona de Silvestro received a total of 20-second post-race Time Penalty for Careless Driving, 5-second for causing contact with Nick Percat and 15-second for causing contact with Lee Holdsworth.

==== Championship standings after Race 13 ====
Drivers Championship

	Pos	Driver	Pts	Gap
	1	(New Zealand) Scott McLaughlin	1358	
	2	(New Zealand) Shane van Gisbergen	1218	-140
1	3	(Australia) Craig Lowndes	1119	-239
1	4	(Australia) David Reynolds	1109	-249
	5	(Australia) Jamie Whincup	1033	-325

Teams Championship

	Pos	Team	Pts	Gap
1	1	DJR Team Penske	2287	
1	2	Triple Eight Race Engineering (1, 97)	2251	-36
	3	Walkinshaw Andretti United	1960	-327
	4	Tickford Racing (5, 55)	1753	-534
	5	Brad Jones Racing	1725	-562

- Note: Only the top five positions are included for both sets of standings.

=== Race 14 ===
==== Qualifying ====
Pos.	No.	Name	Team	Car	Time	Gap	Grid
1	17	(New Zealand) Scott McLaughlin	DJR Team Penske	Ford Falcon FG X	1:19.0199		1
2	12	(New Zealand) Fabian Coulthard	DJR Team Penske	Ford Falcon FG X	1:19.1392	+0.1193	2
3	15	(Australia) Rick Kelly	Nissan Motorsport	Nissan Altima L33	1:19.1974	+0.1775	3
4	23	(Australia) Michael Caruso	Nissan Motorsport	Nissan Altima L33	1:19.3479	+0.3280	4
5	55	(Australia) Chaz Mostert	Tickford Racing	Ford Falcon FG X	1:19.4886	+0.4687	5
6	2	(Australia) Scott Pye	Walkinshaw Andretti United	Holden Commodore ZB	1:19.4913	+0.4714	6
7	97	(New Zealand) Shane van Gisbergen	Triple Eight Race Engineering	Holden Commodore ZB	1:19.5087	+0.4888	7
8	1	(Australia) Jamie Whincup	Triple Eight Race Engineering	Holden Commodore ZB	1:19.5575	+0.5376	8
9	14	(Australia) Tim Slade	Brad Jones Racing	Holden Commodore ZB	1:19.5657	+0.5458	9
10	56	(New Zealand) Richie Stanaway	Tickford Racing	Ford Falcon FG X	1:19.5661	+0.5462	10
11	230	(Australia) Will Davison	23Red Racing	Ford Falcon FG X	1:19.5706	+0.5507	11
12	7	(New Zealand) Andre Heimgartner	Nissan Motorsport	Nissan Altima L33	1:19.6320	+0.6121	12
13	25	(Australia) James Courtney	Walkinshaw Andretti United	Holden Commodore ZB	1:19.6363	+0.6164	13
14	6	(Australia) Cam Waters	Tickford Racing	Ford Falcon FG X	1:19.6387	+0.6188	14
15	8	(Australia) Nick Percat	Brad Jones Racing	Holden Commodore ZB	1:19.6396	+0.6197	15
16	19	(Australia) Jack Le Brocq	Tekno Autosports	Holden Commodore ZB	1:19.6404	+0.6205	16
17	99	(Australia) Anton de Pasquale	Erebus Motorsport	Holden Commodore ZB	1:19.6682	+0.6483	17
18	5	(Australia) Mark Winterbottom	Tickford Racing	Ford Falcon FG X	1:19.7153	+0.6954	18
19	400	(Australia) Lee Holdsworth	Team 18	Holden Commodore ZB	1:19.7762	+0.7563	19
20	21	(Australia) Tim Blanchard	Tim Blanchard Racing	Holden Commodore ZB	1:19.7917	+0.7718	20
21	78	(Switzerland) Simona de Silvestro	Nissan Motorsport	Nissan Altima L33	1:19.8094	+0.7895	21
22	33	(Australia) Garth Tander	Garry Rogers Motorsport	Holden Commodore ZB	1:19.8356	+0.8157	22
23	888	(Australia) Craig Lowndes	Triple Eight Race Engineering	Holden Commodore ZB	1:20.0348	+1.0149	23
24	34	(Australia) James Golding	Garry Rogers Motorsport	Holden Commodore ZB	1:20.0909	+1.0710	24
25	35	(Australia) Todd Hazelwood	Matt Stone Racing	Ford Falcon FG X	1:20.1970	+1.1771	25
26	9	(Australia) David Reynolds	Erebus Motorsport	Holden Commodore ZB	1:20.5702	+1.5503	26

==== Race ====
Pos	No.	Driver	Team	Car	Laps	Time / Retired	Grid	Points
1	12	(New Zealand) Fabian Coulthard	DJR Team Penske	Ford Falcon FG X	67	1:32:22.9780	2	150
2	97	(New Zealand) Shane van Gisbergen	Triple Eight Race Engineering	Holden Commodore ZB	67	+11.0280	7	138
3	17	(New Zealand) Scott McLaughlin	DJR Team Penske	Ford Falcon FG X	67	+18.9180	1	129
4	15	(Australia) Rick Kelly	Nissan Motorsport	Nissan Altima L33	67	+25.4224	3	120
5	23	(Australia) Michael Caruso	Nissan Motorsport	Nissan Altima L33	67	+26.4827	4	111
6	2	(Australia) Scott Pye	Walkinshaw Andretti United	Holden Commodore ZB	67	+27.9519	6	102
7	14	(Australia) Tim Slade	Brad Jones Racing	Holden Commodore ZB	67	+28.3555	9	96
8	1	(Australia) Jamie Whincup	Triple Eight Race Engineering	Holden Commodore ZB	67	+29.6867	8	90
9	56	(New Zealand) Richie Stanaway	Tickford Racing	Ford Falcon FG X	67	+32.9996	10	84
10	55	(Australia) Chaz Mostert	Tickford Racing	Ford Falcon FG X	67	+35.0614	5	78
11	7	(New Zealand) Andre Heimgartner	Nissan Motorsport	Nissan Altima L33	67	+35.5899	12	72
12	888	(Australia) Craig Lowndes	Triple Eight Race Engineering	Holden Commodore ZB	67	+41.5551	23	69
13	230	(Australia) Will Davison	23Red Racing	Ford Falcon FG X	67	+41.8408	11	66
14	8	(Australia) Nick Percat	Brad Jones Racing	Holden Commodore ZB	67	+43.4574	15	63
15	9	(Australia) David Reynolds	Erebus Motorsport	Holden Commodore ZB	67	+50.5904	26	60
16	99	(Australia) Anton de Pasquale	Erebus Motorsport	Holden Commodore ZB	67	+53.5203	17	57
17	19	(Australia) Jack Le Brocq	Tekno Autosports	Holden Commodore ZB	67	+54.1301	16	54
18	21	(Australia) Tim Blanchard	Tim Blanchard Racing	Holden Commodore ZB	67	+55.8735	20	51
19	25	(Australia) James Courtney	Walkinshaw Andretti United	Holden Commodore ZB	67	+57.0196^{1}	13	48
20	5	(Australia) Mark Winterbottom	Tickford Racing	Ford Falcon FG X	67	+57.2754	18	45
21	400	(Australia) Lee Holdsworth	Team 18	Holden Commodore ZB	67	+57.5203	19	42
22	33	(Australia) Garth Tander	Garry Rogers Motorsport	Holden Commodore ZB	67	+58.2880	22	39
23	78	(Switzerland) Simona de Silvestro	Nissan Motorsport	Nissan Altima L33	67	+1:01.8209	21	36
24	35	(Australia) Todd Hazelwood	Matt Stone Racing	Ford Falcon FG X	67	+1:17.9398	25	33
25	34	(Australia) James Golding	Garry Rogers Motorsport	Holden Commodore ZB	67	+1:18.3337	24	30
26	6	(Australia) Cam Waters	Tickford Racing	Ford Falcon FG X	67	+5 laps	14	27
Fastest lap: Scott McLaughlin (DJR Team Penske) 1:19.9402 (on lap 6)

Notes

- ^1– James Courtney received a 15-second Time Penalty for Careless Driving, causing contact with Garth Tander.

==== Championship standings after Race 14 ====
Drivers' Championship standings

Pos	Driver	Pts	Gap
1	(New Zealand) Scott McLaughlin	1487	
2	(New Zealand) Shane van Gisbergen	1356	-129
3	(Australia) Craig Lowndes	1188	-299
4	(Australia) David Reynolds	1169	-318
5	(Australia) Jamie Whincup	1123	-364

Teams Championship

	Pos	Team	Pts	Gap
	1	DJR Team Penske	2566	
	2	Triple Eight Race Engineering (1, 97)	2479	-87
	3	Walkinshaw Andretti United	2110	-456
1	4	Brad Jones Racing	1884	-682
1	5	Tickford Racing (5, 55)	1876	-690

- Note: Only the top five positions are included for both sets of standings.
