= 2018 Sydney SuperNight 300 =

2018 V8 Supercar championship race

(New South Wales) 2018 Sydney SuperSprint
Event Information
- Round 10 of 16 in the 2018 Supercars Championship
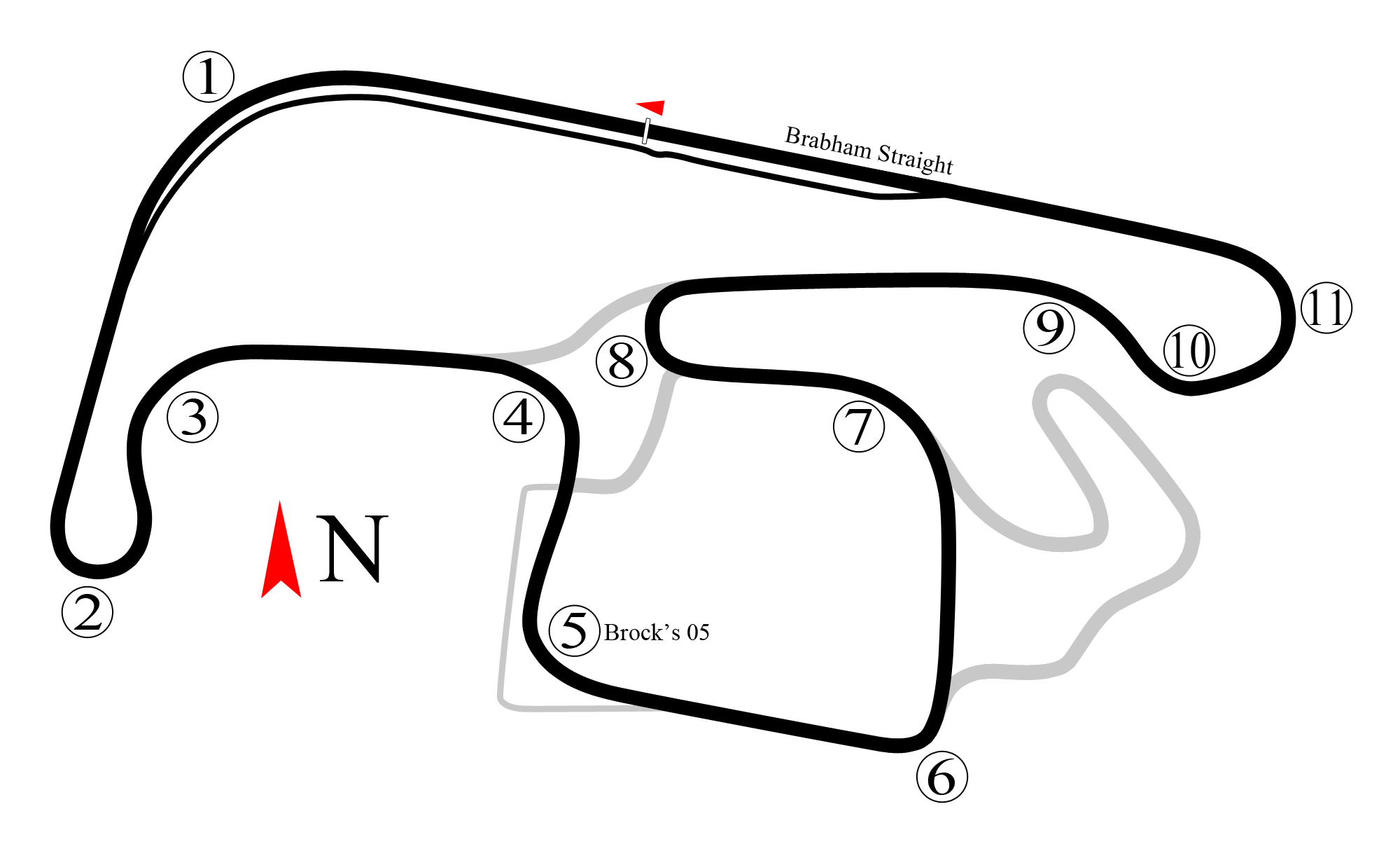
- Date: 3–4 August 2018
- Location: Eastern Creek, New South Wales
- Venue: Sydney Motorsport Park

Results
Race 1
Distance	77 laps	302.364 km
Pole position	(New Zealand) Scott McLaughlin; DJR Team Penske	1:27.9494
Winner	(New Zealand) Shane van Gisbergen; Triple Eight Race Engineering	2:04:32.2394

The 2018 Sydney SuperNight 300 (formally known as 2018 Red Rooster Sydney SuperNight 300) was a motor racing event for the Supercars Championship, held on the weekend of 3–4 August 2018. The event was held at Sydney Motorsport Park in Eastern Creek, New South Wales and consisted of one race, 300 kilometres in length. It was the tenth event of sixteen in the 2018 Supercars Championship and hosted Race 21 of the season.

== Results ==
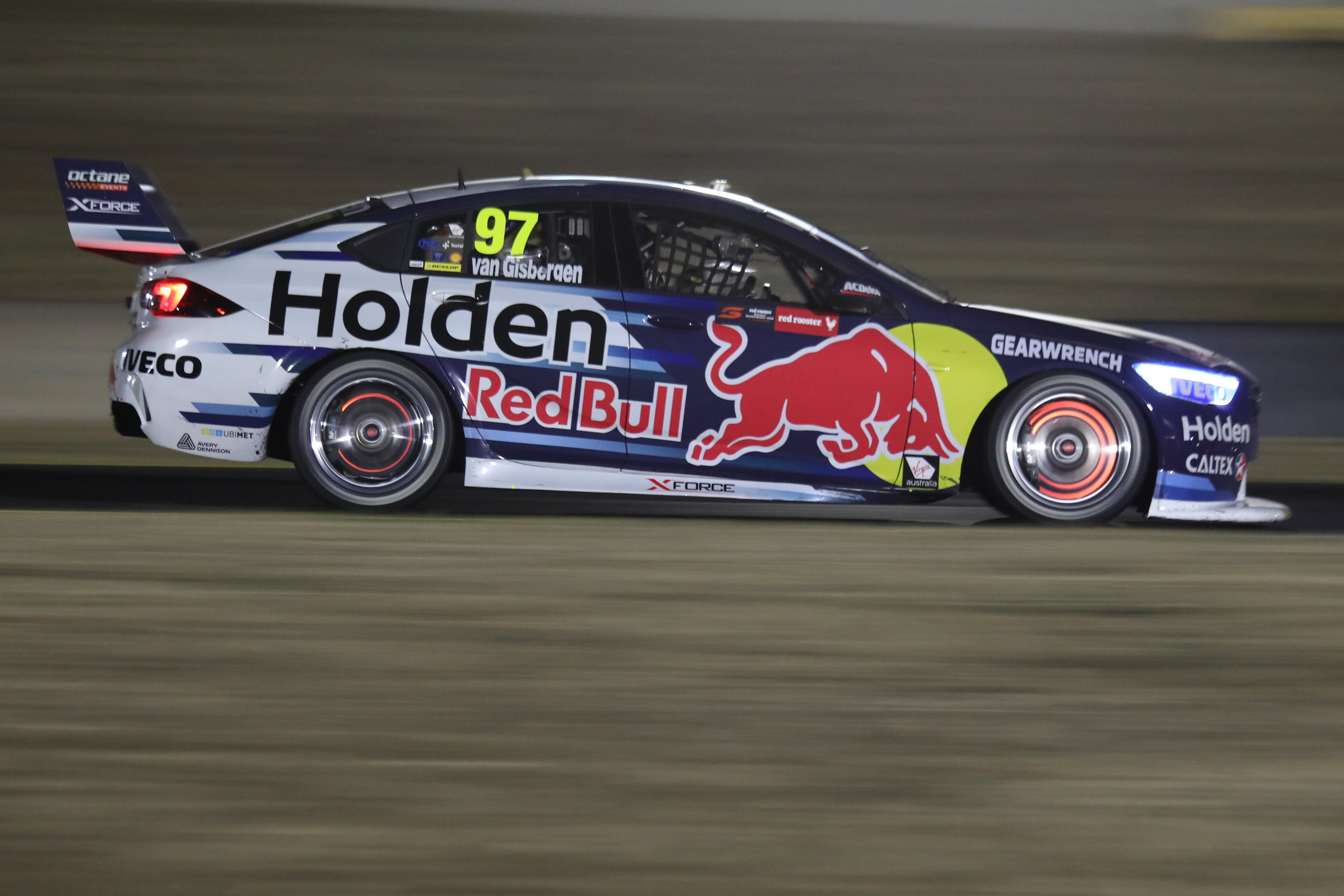
Shane van Gisbergen won the race for Triple Eight Race Engineering.

=== Practice ===
Practice summary
Session	Day	Fastest lap				
Session	Day	No.	Driver	Team	Car	Time
Practice 1	Friday	55	(Australia) Chaz Mostert	Tickford Racing	Ford Falcon FG X	1:28.8546
Practice 2	Friday	17	(New Zealand) Scott McLaughlin	DJR Team Penske	Ford Falcon FG X	1:28.8369

=== Race 21 ===
==== Qualifying ====
Pos.	No.	Name	Team	Car	Q1	Q2	Q3	Grid
1	17	(New Zealand) Scott McLaughlin	DJR Team Penske	Ford Falcon FG X		1:28.0028	1:27.9494	1
2	12	(New Zealand) Fabian Coulthard	DJR Team Penske	Ford Falcon FG X		1:28.2515	1:28.0573	2
3	97	(New Zealand) Shane van Gisbergen	Triple Eight Race Engineering	Holden Commodore ZB	1:28.1071	1:28.2729	1:28.1257	3
4	15	(Australia) Rick Kelly	Nissan Motorsport	Nissan Altima L33		1:28.5086	1:28.1521	4
5	1	(Australia) Jamie Whincup	Triple Eight Race Engineering	Holden Commodore ZB	1:28.1213	1:28.2626	1:28.1930	5
6	2	(Australia) Scott Pye	Walkinshaw Andretti United	Holden Commodore ZB		1:28.4434	1:28.2179	6
7	55	(Australia) Chaz Mostert	Tickford Racing	Ford Falcon FG X		1:28.5374	1:28.3929	7
8	9	(Australia) David Reynolds	Erebus Motorsport	Holden Commodore ZB	1:28.3398	1:28.3348	1:28.4712	8
9	888	(Australia) Craig Lowndes	Triple Eight Race Engineering	Holden Commodore ZB	1:28.2857	1:28.6166	1:28.5306	9
10	23	(Australia) Michael Caruso	Nissan Motorsport	Nissan Altima L33	1:28.4231	1:28.6058	1:28.5881	10
11	25	(Australia) James Courtney	Walkinshaw Andretti United	Holden Commodore ZB		1:28.6982		11
12	14	(Australia) Tim Slade	Brad Jones Racing	Holden Commodore ZB		1:28.7224		12
13	34	(Australia) James Golding	Garry Rogers Motorsport	Holden Commodore ZB		1:28.7976		13
14	5	(Australia) Mark Winterbottom	Tickford Racing	Ford Falcon FG X		1:28.9033		14
15	19	(Australia) Jack Le Brocq	Tekno Autosports	Holden Commodore ZB		1:28.9146		15
16	6	(Australia) Cam Waters	Tickford Racing	Ford Falcon FG X	1:28.5206	1:29.2290		16
17	7	(New Zealand) Andre Heimgartner	Nissan Motorsport	Nissan Altima L33	1:28.6040			17
18	99	(Australia) Anton de Pasquale	Erebus Motorsport	Holden Commodore ZB	1:28.6067			18
19	230	(Australia) Will Davison	23Red Racing	Ford Falcon FG X	1:28.6236			19
20	18	(Australia) Lee Holdsworth	Team 18	Holden Commodore ZB	1:28.7293			20
21	8	(Australia) Nick Percat	Brad Jones Racing	Holden Commodore ZB	1:28.7665			21
22	33	(Australia) Garth Tander	Garry Rogers Motorsport	Holden Commodore ZB	1:28.8373			22
23	78	(Switzerland) Simona de Silvestro	Nissan Motorsport	Nissan Altima L33	1:28.8661			23
24	56	(New Zealand) Richie Stanaway	Tickford Racing	Ford Falcon FG X	1:29.0468			24
25	21	(Australia) Tim Blanchard	Tim Blanchard Racing	Holden Commodore ZB	1:29.1599			25
26	35	(Australia) Todd Hazelwood	Matt Stone Racing	Ford Falcon FG X	1:29.3171			26

==== Race ====
Pos	No.	Driver	Team	Car	Laps	Time / Retired	Grid	Points
1	97	(New Zealand) Shane van Gisbergen	Triple Eight Race Engineering	Holden Commodore ZB	77	2:04:32.2394	3	300
2	1	(Australia) Jamie Whincup	Triple Eight Race Engineering	Holden Commodore ZB	77	+0.2055	5	276
3	17	(New Zealand) Scott McLaughlin	DJR Team Penske	Ford Falcon FG X	77	+4.2717	1	258
4	888	(Australia) Craig Lowndes	Triple Eight Race Engineering	Holden Commodore ZB	77	+5.7590	9	240
5	55	(Australia) Chaz Mostert	Tickford Racing	Ford Falcon FG X	77	+8.3466	7	222
6	15	(Australia) Rick Kelly	Nissan Motorsport	Nissan Altima L33	77	+9.0631	4	204
7	9	(Australia) David Reynolds	Erebus Motorsport	Holden Commodore ZB	77	+9.0631	8	192
8	8	(Australia) Nick Percat	Brad Jones Racing	Holden Commodore ZB	77	+10.4429	21	180
9	19	(Australia) Jack Le Brocq	Tekno Autosports	Holden Commodore ZB	77	+10.8709	15	168
10	14	(Australia) Tim Slade	Brad Jones Racing	Holden Commodore ZB	77	+18.4151	12	156
11	12	(New Zealand) Fabian Coulthard	DJR Team Penske	Ford Falcon FG X	77	+18.9000	2	144
12	18	(Australia) Lee Holdsworth	Team 18	Holden Commodore ZB	77	+19.4497	20	138
13	34	(Australia) James Golding	Garry Rogers Motorsport	Holden Commodore ZB	77	+20.1331	13	132
14	78	(Switzerland) Simona de Silvestro	Nissan Motorsport	Nissan Altima L33	77	+20.7351	23	126
15	5	(Australia) Mark Winterbottom	Tickford Racing	Ford Falcon FG X	77	+21.7221	14	120
16	21	(Australia) Tim Blanchard	Tim Blanchard Racing	Holden Commodore ZB	77	+26.3729^{1}	25	114
17	230	(Australia) Will Davison	23Red Racing	Ford Falcon FG X	77	+45.1064	19	108
18	99	(Australia) Anton de Pasquale	Erebus Motorsport	Holden Commodore ZB	77	+55.8197	18	102
19	6	(Australia) Cam Waters	Tickford Racing	Ford Falcon FG X	76	+1 lap^{2}	16	96
20	33	(Australia) Garth Tander	Garry Rogers Motorsport	Holden Commodore ZB	76	+1 lap	22	90
21	56	(New Zealand) Richie Stanaway	Tickford Racing	Ford Falcon FG X	76	+1 lap	24	84
22	23	(Australia) Michael Caruso	Nissan Motorsport	Nissan Altima L33	74	+3 laps	10	78
23	35	(Australia) Todd Hazelwood	Matt Stone Racing	Ford Falcon FG X	74	+3 laps	26	72
24	7	(New Zealand) Andre Heimgartner	Nissan Motorsport	Nissan Altima L33	68	+9 laps	17	66
25	2	(Australia) Scott Pye	Walkinshaw Andretti United	Holden Commodore ZB	63	+14 laps	6	60
NC	25	(Australia) James Courtney	Walkinshaw Andretti United	Holden Commodore ZB	52	Suspension	11	
Fastest lap: Jamie Whincup (Triple Eight Race Engineering) – 1:29.8424 on Lap 63

Notes

- ^1– Tim Blanchard received a 5-second time penalty for colliding with Garth Tander.
- ^2– Cam Waters received a 15-second time penalty for colliding with Tim Slade.

==== Championship standings after Race 21 ====
Drivers' Championship standings

	Pos	Driver	Pts	Gap
	1	(New Zealand) Scott McLaughlin	2579	
	2	(New Zealand) Shane van Gisbergen	2490	-89
	3	(Australia) Jamie Whincup	2146	-433
1	4	(Australia) Craig Lowndes	2061	-518
1	5	(Australia) David Reynolds	2030	-549

Teams Championship

	Pos	Team	Pts	Gap
	1	Triple Eight Race Engineering (1, 97)	4635	
	2	DJR Team Penske	4375	-260
1	3	Tickford Racing (5, 55)	3103	-1532
2	4	Brad Jones Racing	3063	-1572
	5	Erebus Motorsport	3037	-1598

- Note: Only the top five positions are included for both sets of standings.
