= 2018 Tasmania SuperSprint =

2018 V8 Supercar championship race

2018 Tyrepower Tasmania SuperSprint
Event Information
- Round 3 of 16 in the 2018 Supercars Championship
- Date: 6–8 April 2018
- Location: Launceston, Tasmania
- Venue: Symmons Plains Raceway

Results
Race 1
Distance	50 laps	120.701 km
Pole position	(New Zealand) Shane van Gisbergen; Triple Eight Race Engineering	50.6381
Winner	(Australia) Jamie Whincup; Triple Eight Race Engineering	44:04.7354
Race 2
Distance	84 laps	202.777 km
Pole position	(Australia) Craig Lowndes; Triple Eight Race Engineering	50.5790
Winner	(Australia) Craig Lowndes; Triple Eight Race Engineering	1:14:41.1457

The 2018 Tyrepower Tasmania SuperSprint was a motor racing event for the Supercars Championship, held on the weekend of 6 to 8 April 2018. The event was held at Symmons Plains Raceway in Launceston, Tasmania, and was scheduled to consist of one race of 120 kilometres and one race of 200 kilometres in length. It was the third event of sixteen in the 2018 Supercars Championship and hosted Races 7 and 8 of the season. The event was the 46th running of the Tasmania SuperSprint.

== Report ==
=== Background ===
Shane van Gisbergen of Triple Eight Race Engineering entered the event as the championship leader, 49 points ahead of Erebus Motorsport's David Reynolds and 61 points ahead of DJR Team Penske's Scott McLaughlin.

The event would see the introduction of a new qualifying format. Similar to MotoGP, there will be three sessions. The fastest ten drivers across the Friday practice sessions will get a bye into the second stage, with the other sixteen drivers required to go through Q1. The fastest six will join the other ten for Q2, with the other ten already having set their starting positions. Q2 will see the top ten advance to Q3, with the slowest six confirming their starting positions. Q3 will see the top ten drivers fight for pole position.

== Results ==
=== Practice ===
Practice summary
Session	Day	Fastest lap				
Session	Day	No.	Driver	Team	Car	Time
Practice 1	Friday	97	(New Zealand) Shane van Gisbergen	Triple Eight Race Engineering	Holden Commodore ZB	50.7894
Practice 2	Friday	1	(Australia) Jamie Whincup	Triple Eight Race Engineering	Holden Commodore ZB	50.5609
Practice 3	Saturday	1	(Australia) Jamie Whincup	Triple Eight Race Engineering	Holden Commodore ZB	50.7396
Practice 4	Sunday	1	(Australia) Jamie Whincup	Triple Eight Race Engineering	Holden Commodore ZB	50.6094

=== Race 7 ===
==== Qualifying ====
Pos.	No.	Driver	Team	Car	Q1	Q2	Q3	Grid
1	97	(New Zealand) Shane van Gisbergen	Triple Eight Race Engineering	Holden Commodore ZB		50.8417	50.6381	1
2	1	(Australia) Jamie Whincup	Triple Eight Race Engineering	Holden Commodore ZB		50.7789	50.6897	2
3	17	(New Zealand) Scott McLaughlin	DJR Team Penske	Ford Falcon FG X		50.7876	50.7573	3
4	888	(Australia) Craig Lowndes	Triple Eight Race Engineering	Holden Commodore ZB		50.6740	50.7824	4
5	25	(Australia) James Courtney	Walkinshaw Andretti United	Holden Commodore ZB		50.9739	50.8428	5
6	9	(Australia) David Reynolds	Erebus Motorsport	Holden Commodore ZB		50.8894	50.8498	6
7	2	(Australia) Scott Pye	Walkinshaw Andretti United	Holden Commodore ZB		50.9701	50.8640	7
8	14	(Australia) Tim Slade	Brad Jones Racing	Holden Commodore ZB		50.9665	50.9604	8
9	19	(Australia) Jack Le Brocq	Tekno Autosports	Holden Commodore ZB	50.9166	50.8614	51.0832	9
10	33	(Australia) Garth Tander	Garry Rogers Motorsport	Holden Commodore ZB	51.0544	50.9717	51.2352	10
11	12	(New Zealand) Fabian Coulthard	DJR Team Penske	Ford Falcon FG X		50.9890		11
12	18	(Australia) Lee Holdsworth	Team 18	Holden Commodore ZB	51.0751	50.9951		12
13	6	(Australia) Cam Waters	Tickford Racing	Ford Falcon FG X	50.9587	51.0249		13
14	15	(Australia) Rick Kelly	Nissan Motorsport	Nissan Altima L33	51.1059	51.0655		14
15	5	(Australia) Mark Winterbottom	Tickford Racing	Ford Falcon FG X		51.0992		15
16	7	(New Zealand) Andre Heimgartner	Nissan Motorsport	Nissan Altima L33	51.0387	51.2326		16
17	55	(Australia) Chaz Mostert	Tickford Racing	Ford Falcon FG X	51.1186			17
18	8	(Australia) Nick Percat	Brad Jones Racing	Holden Commodore ZB	51.2085			18
19	56	(New Zealand) Richie Stanaway	Tickford Racing	Ford Falcon FG X	51.2120			19
20	99	(Australia) Anton de Pasquale	Erebus Motorsport	Holden Commodore ZB	51.2268			20
21	23	(Australia) Michael Caruso	Nissan Motorsport	Nissan Altima L33	51.2687			21
22	35	(Australia) Todd Hazelwood	Matt Stone Racing	Ford Falcon FG X	51.3603			22
23	34	(Australia) James Golding	Garry Rogers Motorsport	Holden Commodore ZB	51.3621			23
24	230	(Australia) Will Davison	23Red Racing	Ford Falcon FG X	51.4583			24
25	78	(Switzerland) Simona de Silvestro	Nissan Motorsport	Nissan Altima L33	51.5509			25
26	21	(Australia) Tim Blanchard	Tim Blanchard Racing	Holden Commodore ZB	51.6511			26

==== Race ====
Pos	No.	Driver	Team	Car	Laps	Time / Retired	Grid	Points
1	1	(Australia) Jamie Whincup	Triple Eight Race Engineering	Holden Commodore ZB	50	44:04.7354	2	150
2	888	(Australia) Craig Lowndes	Triple Eight Race Engineering	Holden Commodore ZB	50	+2.3457	4	138
3	25	(Australia) James Courtney	Walkinshaw Andretti United	Holden Commodore ZB	50	+3.5874	5	129
4	9	(Australia) David Reynolds	Erebus Motorsport	Holden Commodore ZB	50	+4.7927	6	120
5	12	(New Zealand) Fabian Coulthard	DJR Team Penske	Ford Falcon FG X	50	+8.7263	11	111
6	97	(New Zealand) Shane van Gisbergen	Triple Eight Race Engineering	Holden Commodore ZB	50	+14.3481	1	102
7	14	(Australia) Tim Slade	Brad Jones Racing	Holden Commodore ZB	50	+14.6397	8	96
8	2	(Australia) Scott Pye	Walkinshaw Andretti United	Holden Commodore ZB	50	+15.0225	7	90
9	17	(New Zealand) Scott McLaughlin	DJR Team Penske	Ford Falcon FG X	50	+15.8197	3	84
10	19	(Australia) Jack Le Brocq	Tekno Autosports	Holden Commodore ZB	50	+16.3784	9	78
11	18	(Australia) Lee Holdsworth	Team 18	Holden Commodore ZB	50	+16.5533	12	72
12	8	(Australia) Nick Percat	Brad Jones Racing	Holden Commodore ZB	50	+19.6312	18	69
13	33	(Australia) Garth Tander	Garry Rogers Motorsport	Holden Commodore ZB	50	+23.8659	10	66
14	5	(Australia) Mark Winterbottom	Tickford Racing	Ford Falcon FG X	50	+24.0998	15	63
15	15	(Australia) Rick Kelly	Nissan Motorsport	Nissan Altima L33	50	+25.7530	14	60
16	23	(Australia) Michael Caruso	Nissan Motorsport	Nissan Altima L33	50	+26.0549	21	57
17	7	(New Zealand) Andre Heimgartner	Nissan Motorsport	Nissan Altima L33	50	+33.4381	16	54
18	230	(Australia) Will Davison	23Red Racing	Ford Falcon FG X	50	+34.4240	24	51
19	99	(Australia) Anton de Pasquale	Erebus Motorsport	Holden Commodore ZB	50	+34.9266	20	48
20	21	(Australia) Tim Blanchard	Tim Blanchard Racing	Holden Commodore ZB	50	+39.7353	26	45
21	35	(Australia) Todd Hazelwood	Matt Stone Racing	Ford Falcon FG X	50	+40.2498	25	42
22	78	(Switzerland) Simona de Silvestro	Nissan Motorsport	Nissan Altima L33	50	+42.7756	24	39
23	34	(Australia) James Golding	Garry Rogers Motorsport	Holden Commodore ZB	50	+47.0689	23	36
24	6	(Australia) Cam Waters	Tickford Racing	Ford Falcon FG X	50	+48.6915^{1}	13	33
25	56	(New Zealand) Richie Stanaway	Tickford Racing	Ford Falcon FG X	43	+7 laps	19	30
NC	55	(Australia) Chaz Mostert	Tickford Racing	Ford Falcon FG X	22	Fire	17	
Fastest lap: Scott Pye (Walkinshaw Andretti United) 51.2622 (on lap 24)

Notes

- ^1– Cam Waters received a 15-second post-race Time Penalty for Careless Driving, making contact with James Golding.

==== Championship standings after Race 7 ====
Drivers Championship

	Pos	Driver	Pts	Gap
	1	(New Zealand) Shane van Gisbergen	588	
	2	(Australia) David Reynolds	557	-31
3	3	(Australia) Jamie Whincup	529	-59
1	4	(New Zealand) Scott McLaughlin	509	-79
2	5	(Australia) James Courtney	504	-84

Teams Championship

	Pos	Team	Pts	Gap
	1	Triple Eight Race Engineering (1, 97)	1117	
	2	Walkinshaw Andretti United	991	-126
1	3	DJR Team Penske	928	-189
1	4	Brad Jones Racing	837	-280
2	5	Tickford Racing (5, 55)	808	-309

- Note: Only the top five positions are included for both sets of standings.

=== Race 8 ===
==== Qualifying ====
Pos.	No.	Name	Team	Car	Q1	Q2	Q3	Grid
1	888	(Australia) Craig Lowndes	Triple Eight Race Engineering	Holden Commodore ZB		50.8794	50.5790	1
2	97	(New Zealand) Shane van Gisbergen	Triple Eight Race Engineering	Holden Commodore ZB		50.6250	50.5870	2
3	1	(Australia) Jamie Whincup	Triple Eight Race Engineering	Holden Commodore ZB		50.8025	50.6882	3
4	17	(New Zealand) Scott McLaughlin	DJR Team Penske	Ford Falcon FG X		50.8498	50.7808	4
5	19	(Australia) Jack Le Brocq	Tekno Autosports	Holden Commodore ZB		50.8735	50.7860	5
6	12	(New Zealand) Fabian Coulthard	DJR Team Penske	Ford Falcon FG X		50.8483	50.8099	6
7	25	(Australia) James Courtney	Walkinshaw Andretti United	Holden Commodore ZB		50.9336	50.8156	7
8	9	(Australia) David Reynolds	Erebus Motorsport	Holden Commodore ZB		50.7294	50.8608	8
9	33	(Australia) Garth Tander	Garry Rogers Motorsport	Holden Commodore ZB		50.9275	50.9681	9
10	2	(Australia) Scott Pye	Walkinshaw Andretti United	Holden Commodore ZB	51.0003	50.8598	51.0092	10
11	55	(Australia) Chaz Mostert	Tickford Racing	Ford Falcon FG X	51.1193	50.9462		11
12	5	(Australia) Mark Winterbottom	Tickford Racing	Ford Falcon FG X	51.0917	50.9530		12
13	15	(Australia) Rick Kelly	Nissan Motorsport	Nissan Altima L33		50.9866		13
14	6	(Australia) Cam Waters	Tickford Racing	Ford Falcon FG X	51.1154	51.0344		14
15	230	(Australia) Will Davison	23Red Racing	Ford Falcon FG X	51.1427	51.0967		15
16	14	(Australia) Tim Slade	Brad Jones Racing	Holden Commodore ZB	51.0924	51.1394		16
17	8	(Australia) Nick Percat	Brad Jones Racing	Holden Commodore ZB	51.1781			17
18	18	(Australia) Lee Holdsworth	Team 18	Holden Commodore ZB	51.1911			18
19	7	(New Zealand) Andre Heimgartner	Nissan Motorsport	Nissan Altima L33	51.2027			19
20	23	(Australia) Michael Caruso	Nissan Motorsport	Nissan Altima L33	51.2567			20
21	35	(Australia) Todd Hazelwood	Matt Stone Racing	Ford Falcon FG X	51.3257			21
22	99	(Australia) Anton de Pasquale	Erebus Motorsport	Holden Commodore ZB	51.3434			22
23	78	(Switzerland) Simona de Silvestro	Nissan Motorsport	Nissan Altima L33	51.3531			23
24	56	(New Zealand) Richie Stanaway	Tickford Racing	Ford Falcon FG X	51.3922			24
25	21	(Australia) Tim Blanchard	Tim Blanchard Racing	Holden Commodore ZB	51.4411			25
26	34	(Australia) James Golding	Garry Rogers Motorsport	Holden Commodore ZB	51.5887			26

==== Race ====
Pos	No.	Driver	Team	Car	Laps	Time / Retired	Grid	Points
1	888	(Australia) Craig Lowndes	Triple Eight Race Engineering	Holden Commodore ZB	84	1:14:41.1457	1	150
2	17	(New Zealand) Scott McLaughlin	DJR Team Penske	Ford Falcon FG X	84	+2.3571	4	138
3	1	(Australia) Jamie Whincup	Triple Eight Race Engineering	Holden Commodore ZB	84	+3.6000	3	129
4	25	(Australia) James Courtney	Walkinshaw Andretti United	Holden Commodore ZB	84	+5.5988	7	120
5	19	(Australia) Jack Le Brocq	Tekno Autosports	Holden Commodore ZB	84	+15.7860	5	111
6	2	(Australia) Scott Pye	Walkinshaw Andretti United	Holden Commodore ZB	84	+16.5096	10	102
7	33	(Australia) Garth Tander	Garry Rogers Motorsport	Holden Commodore ZB	84	+23.4884	9	96
8	9	(Australia) David Reynolds	Erebus Motorsport	Holden Commodore ZB	84	+24.2924	8	90
9	8	(Australia) Nick Percat	Brad Jones Racing	Holden Commodore ZB	84	+24.7776	17	84
10	55	(Australia) Chaz Mostert	Tickford Racing	Ford Falcon FG X	84	+39.3819	11	78
11	15	(Australia) Rick Kelly	Nissan Motorsport	Nissan Altima L33	84	+39.4912	13	72
12	5	(Australia) Mark Winterbottom	Tickford Racing	Ford Falcon FG X	84	+39.9953	12	69
13	6	(Australia) Cam Waters	Tickford Racing	Ford Falcon FG X	84	+40.2848	14	66
14	14	(Australia) Tim Slade	Brad Jones Racing	Holden Commodore ZB	83	+1 lap	16	63
15	99	(Australia) Anton de Pasquale	Erebus Motorsport	Holden Commodore ZB	83	+1 lap	22	60
16	21	(Australia) Tim Blanchard	Tim Blanchard Racing	Holden Commodore ZB	83	+1 lap	25	57
17	12	(New Zealand) Fabian Coulthard	DJR Team Penske	Ford Falcon FG X	83	+1 lap	6	54
18	34	(Australia) James Golding	Garry Rogers Motorsport	Holden Commodore ZB	83	+1 lap	26	51
19	7	(New Zealand) Andre Heimgartner	Nissan Motorsport	Nissan Altima L33	83	+1 lap	19	48
20	35	(Australia) Todd Hazelwood	Matt Stone Racing	Ford Falcon FG X	83	+1 lap	21	45
21	78	(Switzerland) Simona de Silvestro	Nissan Motorsport	Nissan Altima L33	83	+1 lap	23	42
22	230	(Australia) Will Davison	23Red Racing	Ford Falcon FG X	83	+1 lap	15	39
23	18	(Australia) Lee Holdsworth	Team 18	Holden Commodore ZB	83	+1 lap	18	36
24	23	(Australia) Michael Caruso	Nissan Motorsport	Nissan Altima L33	83	+1 lap^{1}	20	33
25	97	(New Zealand) Shane van Gisbergen	Triple Eight Race Engineering	Holden Commodore ZB	83	+1 lap	2	30
NC	56	(New Zealand) Richie Stanaway	Tickford Racing	Ford Falcon FG X	0	Suspension	24	
Fastest lap: James Courtney (Walkinshaw Andretti United) 51.4977 (on lap 24)

Notes

- ^1– Michael Caruso received a 15-second post-race Time Penalty for Careless Driving, causing contact with Will Davison.

==== Championship standings after Race 8 ====
Drivers Championship

	Pos	Driver	Pts	Gap
2	1	(Australia) Jamie Whincup	658	
2	2	(New Zealand) Scott McLaughlin	647	-11
1	3	(Australia) David Reynolds	647	-11
1	4	(Australia) James Courtney	624	-34
4	5	(New Zealand) Shane van Gisbergen	618	-40

Teams Championship

Pos	Team	Pts	Gap
1	Triple Eight Race Engineering (1, 97)	1276	
2	Walkinshaw Andretti United	1213	-63
3	DJR Team Penske	1120	-156
4	Brad Jones Racing	984	-292
5	Tickford Racing (5, 55)	955	-321

- Note: Only the top five positions are included for both sets of standings.
