= Will Davison =

Australian racing driver (born 1982)

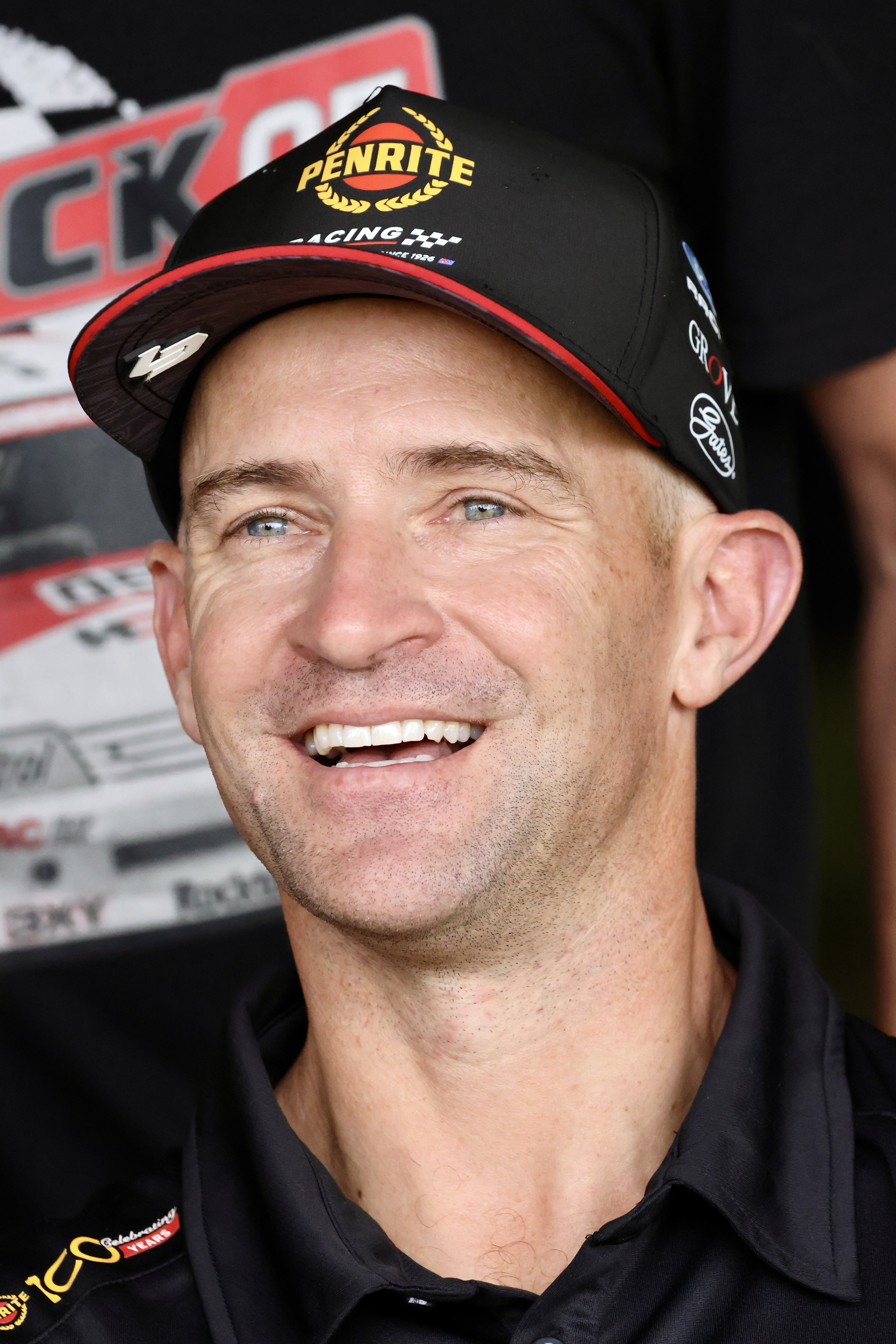
- Davison at the 2026 Adelaide Motorsport Festival
- Nationality: Australian
- Born: William Davison; 30 August 1982 (age 44) Melbourne, Australia
- Relatives: Lex Davison (grandfather); Alex Davison (brother); James Davison (cousin)
- Categorisation: FIA Gold

Supercars Championship career
- Current team: Grove Racing
- Championships: 0
- Races: 599
- Wins: 22
- Podiums: 88
- Pole positions: 29
- 2024 position: 9th (1812 pts)

William Davison (born 30 August 1982) is an Australian professional racing driver. He co-drives with Matt Payne in the No. 19 Ford Mustang GT for Grove Racing in the Ryco Enduro Cup. Davison is a two-time winner of the Bathurst 1000, in 2009 and 2016.

== Early career ==
Having won the Victorian title in 2000, Davison won the 2001 Australian Formula Ford Championship, competing against future IndyCar driver Will Power and Leanne Ferrier.

== Open-wheel career ==
=== European campaign ===
Taking a common route to Formula One, Davison packed up and moved to Buckinghamshire in England where he competed in the 2002 British Formula Renault Championship, finishing fourth in the series. In 2003 he moved up to the British Formula 3 Championship with Alan Docking Racing but an enforced mid-year change of teams to Menu F3 did not help his campaign. Davison continued with Menu F3 into 2004 but his campaign was cut short for financial reasons.

In 2004, Davison tested a Minardi Formula One car with fellow Australian Will Power at the Misano World Circuit in Italy, organised by Minardi's Australian team owner, Paul Stoddart.

=== A1 Grand Prix ===
During his time between Formula 3 and V8 Supercar seats, Davison drove for A1 Team Australia in the inaugural season of the A1 Grand Prix, where he was once again racing for Alan Docking Racing. During the season he experienced many ups and downs, including being involved in various incidents outside his own control. The positives for the season were two sixth-place finishes in both the Portuguese and Australian feature races.

== Touring car career ==
=== Team Dynamik ===
In 2004, Davison made his first appearance in Australia's premier touring car series, V8 Supercars, driving a third car for Team Dynamik at Winton. However, it was an inauspicious debut as he only managed to complete a single lap before retiring. He then reappeared in the next round at Oran Park before co-driving with Dale Brede in the endurance events, the Sandown 500 and Bathurst 1000, with the latter event marking his final appearance of the season.

=== Dick Johnson Racing ===
In 2005, Davison was not able to find a full-time drive. However, he did appear at Sandown and Bathurst, where he drove for Dick Johnson Racing, co-driving with Steven Johnson in the No. 17 Westpoint Falcon. By mid-November 2005, Davison had been signed as a full-time driver for Dick Johnson Racing, set to pilot the team's No. 18 Falcon in 2006.

For Davison, 2006 was a quiet year as Davison was plagued by technical difficulties. He recorded only modest results, with a fourth place with team-mate Steven Johnson at Sandown being his lone highlight. He finished 19th in the championship. In 2007, Davison continued to drive the No. 18 Falcon under the team's new naming rights sponsor, Jim Beam. In the 2007 endurance races, Davison partnered with Steven Johnson for the third straight year, with the duo scoring a third place at Bathurst. He finished tenth in the championship.

Davison remained at the team to race the No. 18 Falcon in 2008, winning his first championship race and round at Eastern Creek Raceway the second round of 2008. It was the team's first round victory in seven years. Davison also scored a further two podiums in the year, one of these with teammate Steven Johnson at the Phillip Island 500. He finished a career-high fifth in the championship.

=== Holden Racing Team ===
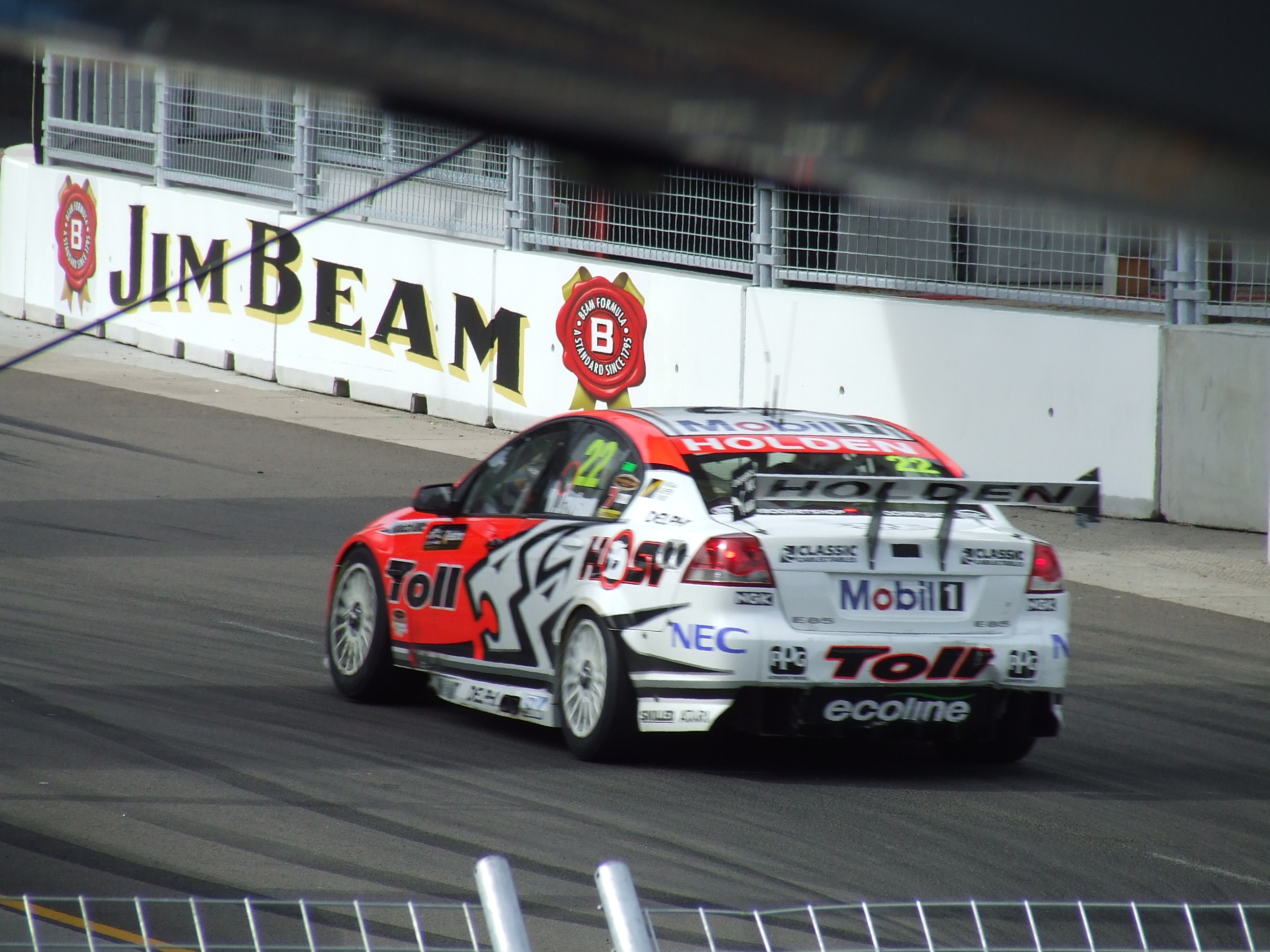
Davison at the 2009 Sydney Telstra 500

In 2009, Davison moved to the Holden Racing Team to drive the No. 22 Holden VE Commodore. This was Davison's best year to date; he finished second in the championship after collecting a round win at the Sandown Challenge, a race win at Queensland Raceway and a rare endurance double at the Phillip Island 500 and Bathurst 1000, driving with Garth Tander. This provided Davison with his first Bathurst victory. He also scored several other podiums during the year and won the Barry Sheene Medal at the post-season awards night.

In 2010, Davison continued with HRT, but technical issues and bad luck plagued him throughout the entire year and he finished the championship in 22nd place. Midway through the season, Davison decided to end his relationship with Holden Racing Team and signed with Ford Performance Racing for 2011 to drive the No. 6 Trading Post FPR Falcon.

=== Ford Performance Racing ===
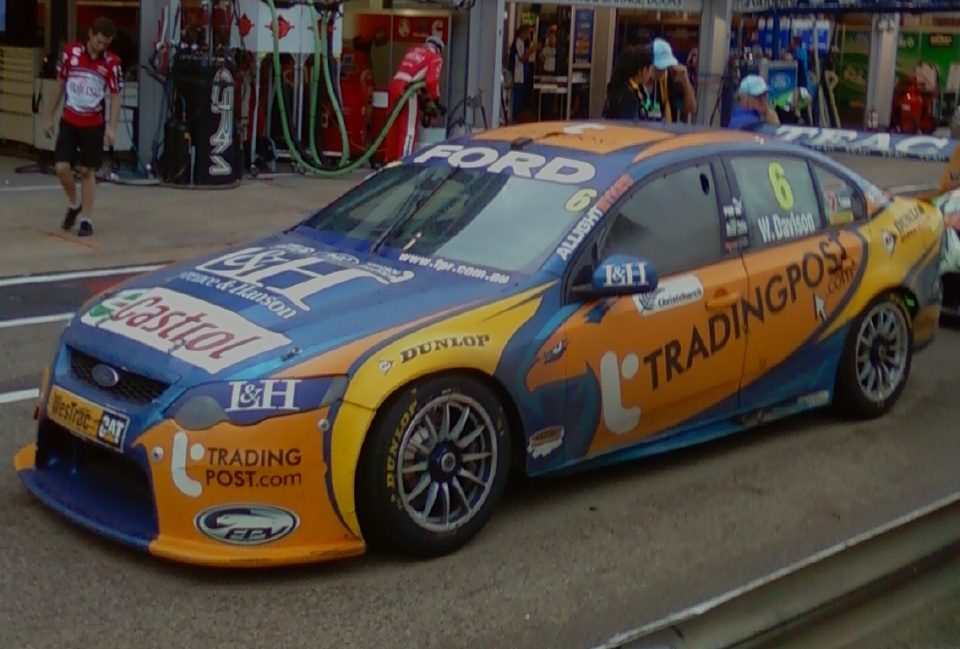
The Ford FG Falcon of Will Davison at the 2011 Clipsal 500 Adelaide

2011 saw Davison regain his form as a front runner, with four pole positions and six podiums. Although unable to break through for a win, he ended the season seventh in the championship.

2012 started on a high note: after 11 starts and six wins, including winning the Clipsal 500 Adelaide for the first time, Davison was the leader of the series, albeit involved in a very tight battle for the championship with Jamie Whincup and his FPR teammate Mark Winterbottom. However, after a stroke of bad luck in the endurance races, despite scoring his maiden Bathurst 1000 pole position, Davison only managed to finish fourth overall.

2013 once again ended in disappointment for Davison, with a number of racing incidents transpiring to ruin his championship ambitions causing him to finish third in the standings behind the Triple Eight Racing duo of Craig Lowndes and Jamie Whincup.

=== Erebus Motorsport ===
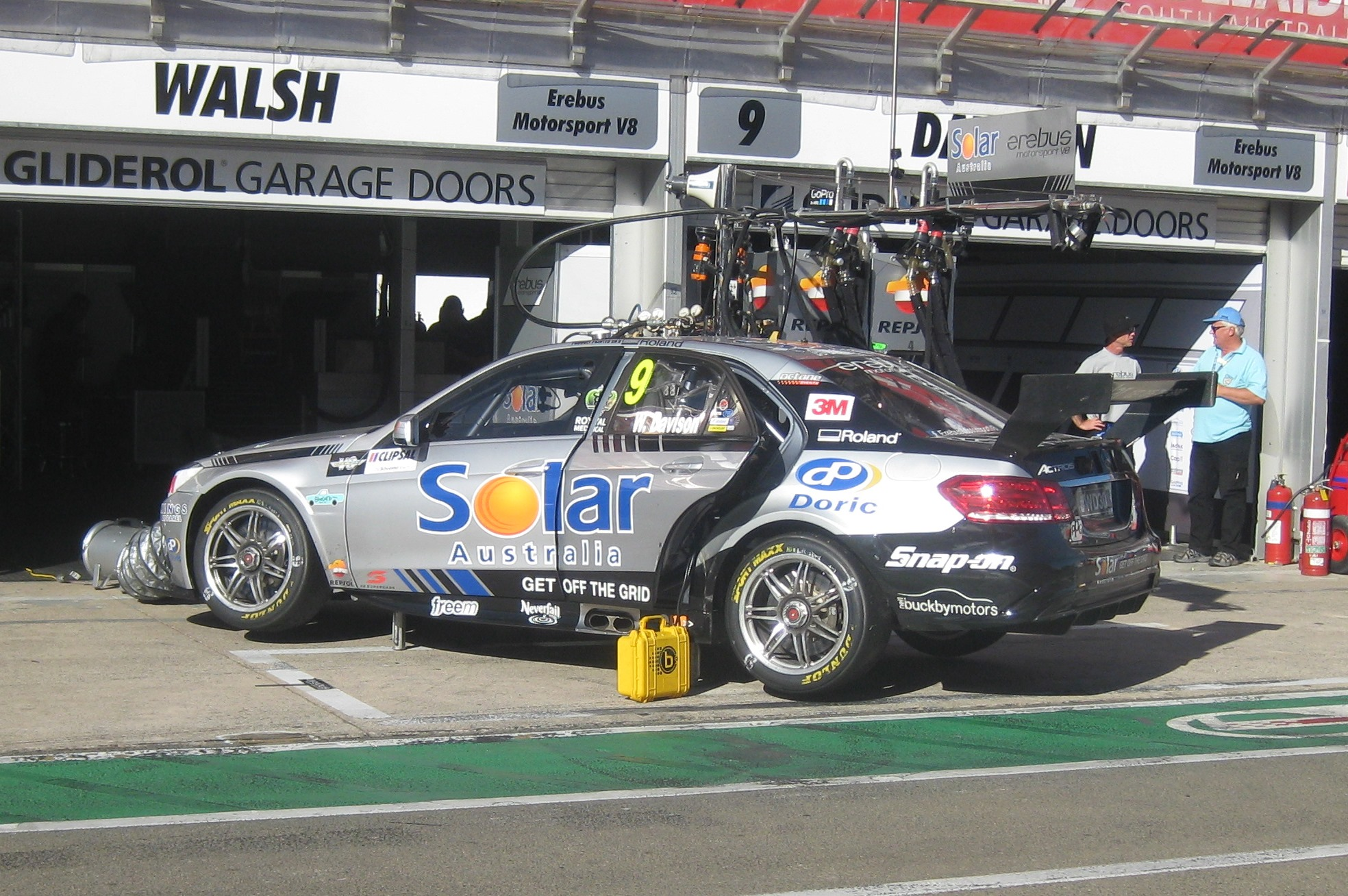
Davison's Mercedes-Benz E63 AMG (W212) at the 2015 Clipsal 500 Adelaide

Davison confirmed in early 2014 that he would be joining Erebus Motorsport on a four-year contract. Driving a Mercedes-Benz E63 AMG, he finished 14th in 2014 and 15th in 2015, collecting just one win, at the 2015 Ubet Perth Super Sprint, and six top-five results. In both years, Davison drove with his brother Alex in the Enduro Cup, narrowly missing a Bathurst podium in 2014. Financial pressures on the team resulted in Davison being given permission in mid-2015 to negotiate a drive elsewhere.

=== Tekno Autosports ===
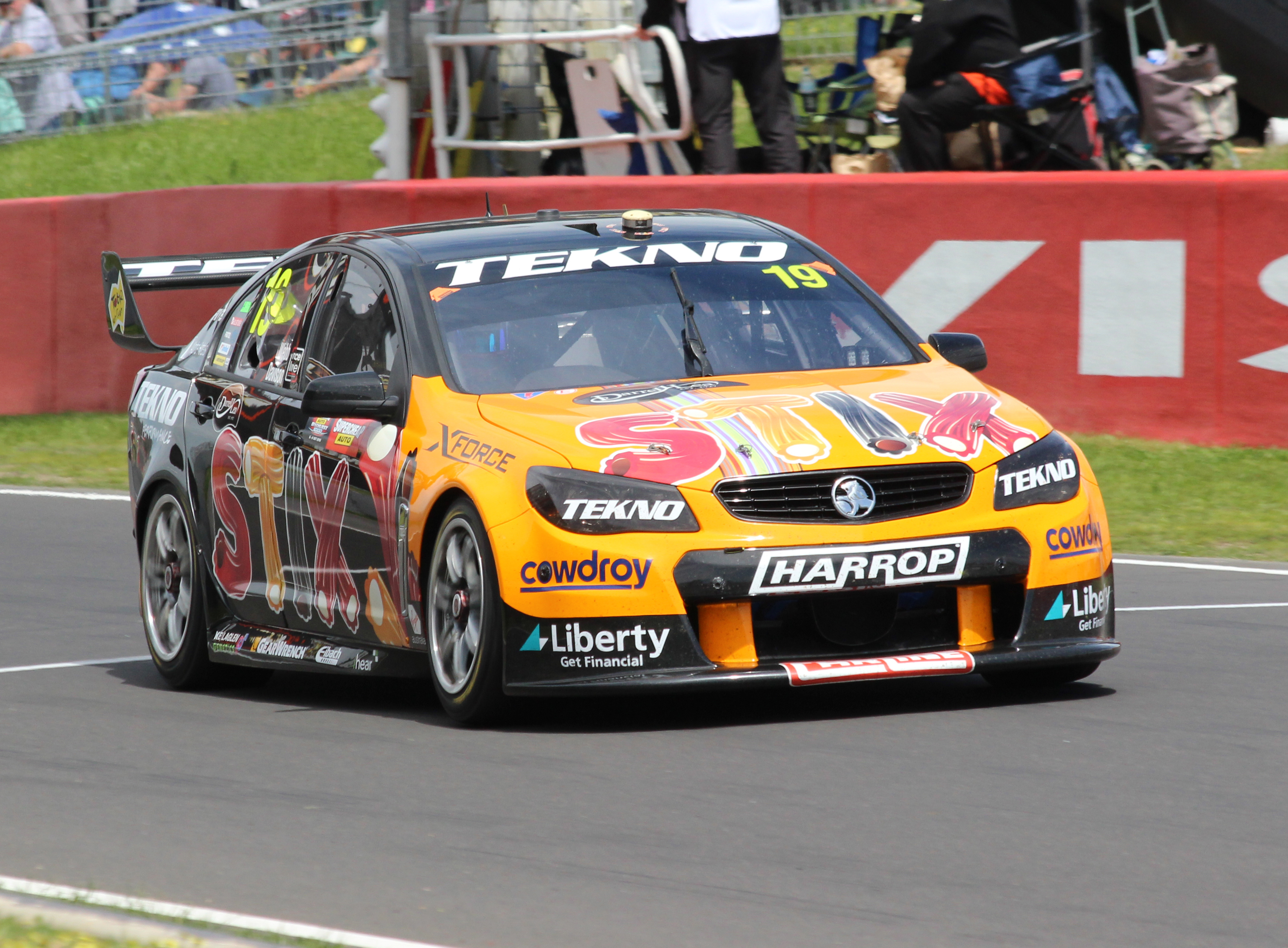
Will Davison and Jonathon Webb at the 2016 Bathurst 1000, a race in which they won

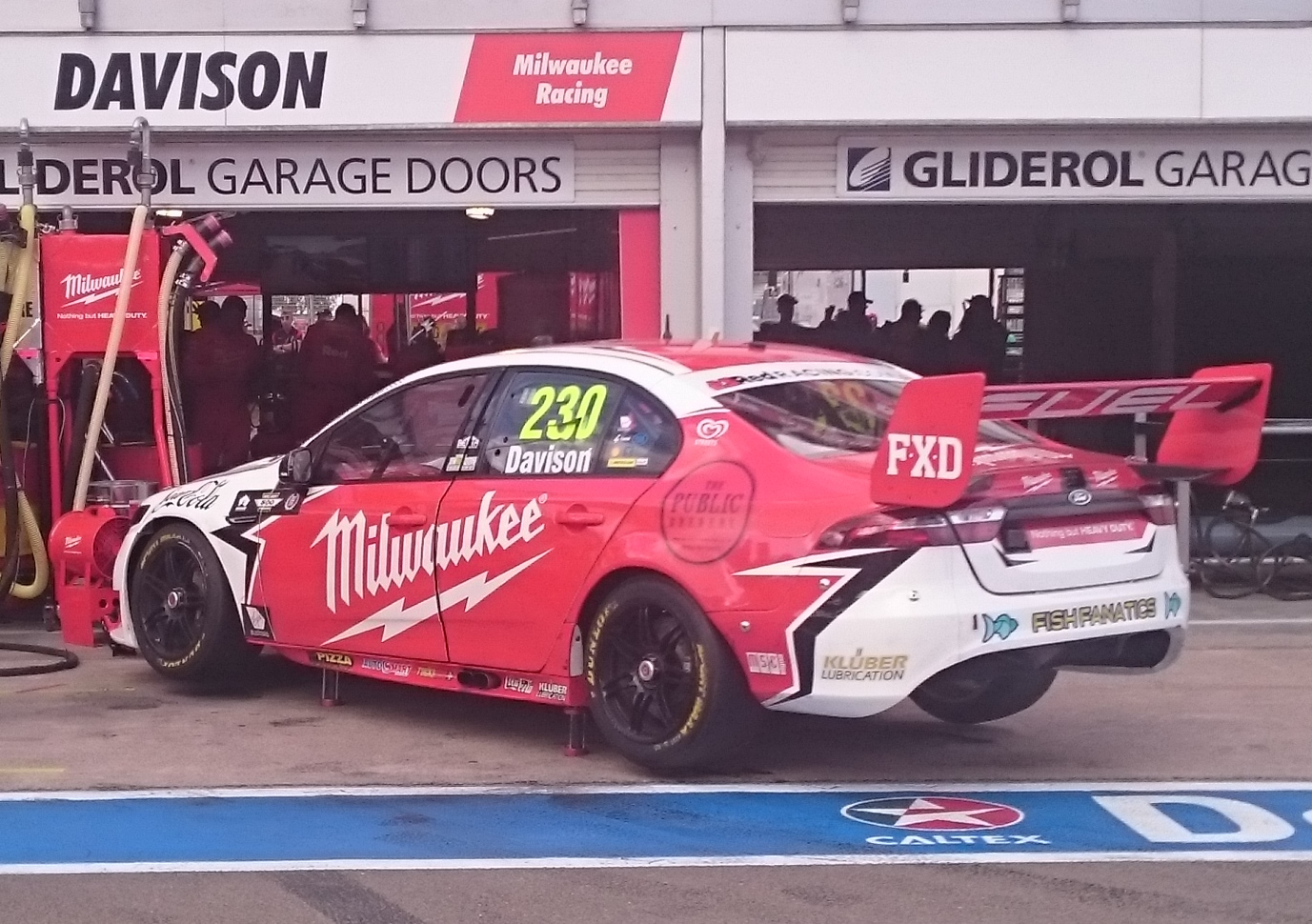
Davison's Ford Falcon FG X at the 2018 Adelaide 500

Davison moved to Tekno Autosports in 2016, returning to Holden for the first time since 2010. The move brought Davison near-immediate success, winning the second round of the year, the Tasmania SuperSprint. After a lean patch in the middle of the year, Davison returned to form at the Enduro Cup, finishing third at Sandown with Jonathon Webb. At the Bathurst 1000, Davison achieved an even better result, capitalising on late drama between the race leaders to take his second Bathurst crown, despite not leading any laps.

=== 23Red Racing ===
Davison contested the Supercars Championship with 23Red Racing from 2018 through to the demise of the team in 2020.

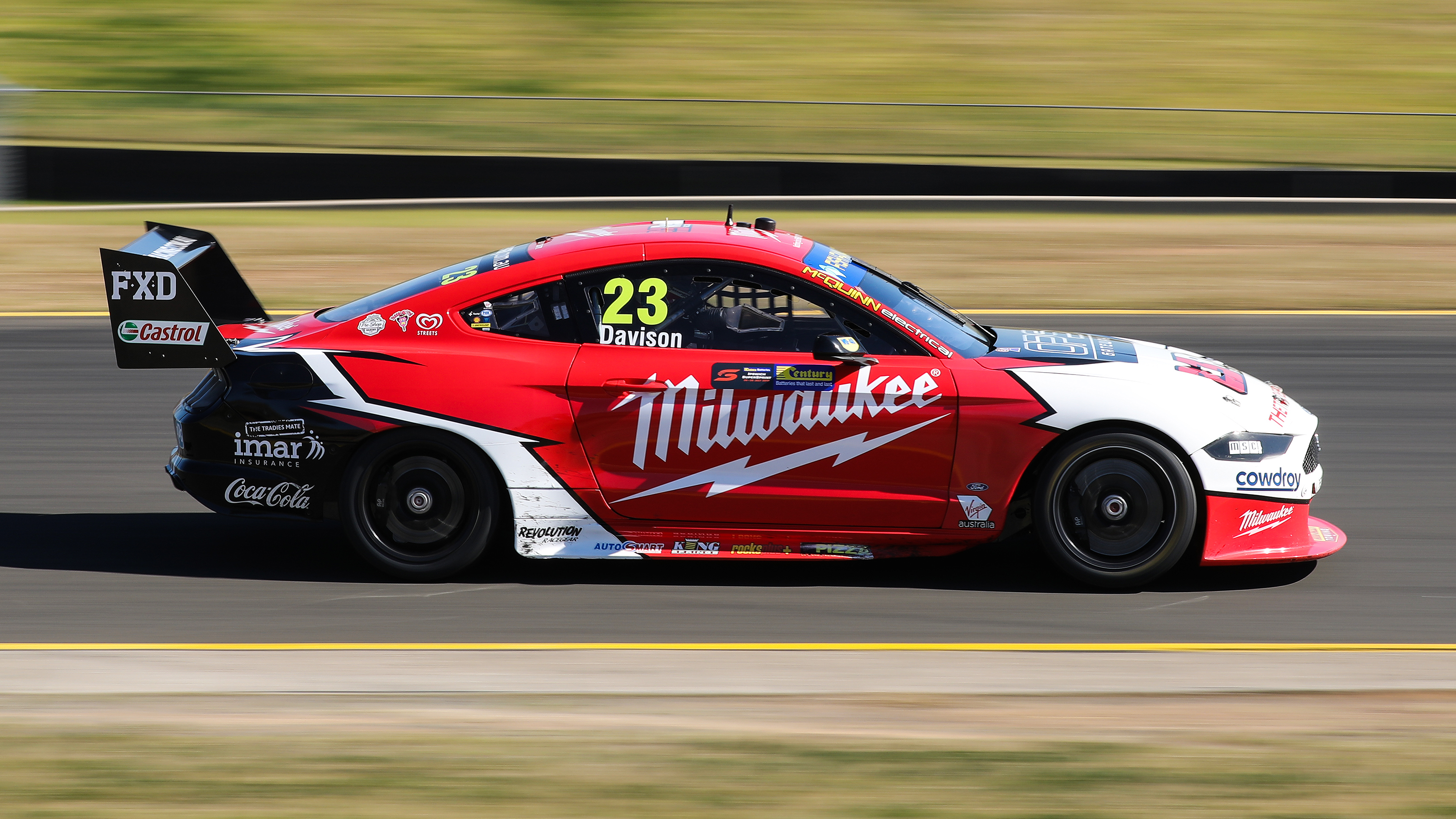
Davison at a Supercars Ride Day in August 2019

=== Dick Johnson Racing ===
In 2020, it was announced that Davison would sign for Dick Johnson Racing in the 2021 Supercars Championship racing alongside Anton de Pasquale.

== GT career ==
Davison has competed multiple times in the Bathurst 12 Hour, with a best result of 3rd in 2014 in an Erebus Motorsport-prepared Mercedes-Benz SLS AMG.

== Personal life ==
His grandfather Lex Davison won the Australian Grand Prix four times and also won the 1957 Australian Drivers' Championship. His father Richard Davison was the winner of the 1980 Australian Formula 2 Championship and his brother Alex Davison has won numerous titles including the 2004 Australian Carrera Cup Championship as well as also competing in Supercars for several years. Continuing the family tradition, cousin James Davison has competed in the IndyCar Series and the Rolex Sports Car Series. His grandmother Diana Davison was one of the first female racing drivers in Australia. His stepgrandfather Tony Gaze was a decorated fighter pilot in World War II and also a Formula One driver.

Davison is married to Riana Crehan as of early 2020, a pit reporter for Supercars Media.

== Career results ==
Season	Series	Position	Car	Team
2000	Australian Formula Ford Championship	6th	Stealth Van Diemen RF95 - Ford	Will Davison
2000	Victorian Formula Ford Championship	**1st**	Stealth Van Diemen RF95 - Ford	Will Davison
2001	Australian Formula Ford Championship	**1st**	Van Diemen RF01 - Ford	Sonic Motor Racing Services
2002	British Formula Renault Championship	4th	Tatuus - Renault 2.0	Motaworld Racing
2003	British Formula 3 Championship	8th	Dallara F303 Spiess - Opel	Alan Docking Racing; Menu F3 Motorsport
2004	British Formula 3 Championship	13th	Dallara F303 Spiess - Opel	Menu F3 Motorsport
2004	V8 Supercar Championship Series	67th	Holden VY Commodore	Team Dynamik
2005	V8 Supercar Championship Series	59th	Ford BA Falcon	Dick Johnson Racing
2005	HPDC V8 Supercar Series	28th	Ford AU Falcon	Dick Johnson Racing
2005/06	A1 Grand Prix	13th	Lola A1GP Zytek	A1 Team Australia
2006	V8 Supercar Championship Series	19th	Ford BA Falcon	Dick Johnson Racing
2007	V8 Supercar Championship Series	10th	Ford BF Falcon	Dick Johnson Racing
2007	Australian GT Championship	20th	Aston Martin DBRS9	Abcor
2007	Australian Tourist Trophy	7th	Aston Martin DBRS9	Abcor
2008	V8 Supercar Championship Series	5th	Ford BF Falcon	Dick Johnson Racing
2009	V8 Supercar Championship Series	**2nd**	Holden VE Commodore	Holden Racing Team
2010	V8 Supercar Championship Series	22nd	Holden VE Commodore	Holden Racing Team
2011	International V8 Supercars Championship	7th	Ford FG Falcon	Ford Performance Racing
2012	International V8 Supercars Championship	4th	Ford FG Falcon	Ford Performance Racing
2013	International V8 Supercars Championship	**3rd**	Ford FG Falcon	Ford Performance Racing
2014	International V8 Supercars Championship	14th	Mercedes-Benz E63 AMG	Erebus Motorsport
2015	International V8 Supercars Championship	15th	Mercedes-Benz E63 AMG	Erebus Motorsport
2015	Kuala Lumpur City Grand Prix Supercars Challenge	4th	Mercedes-Benz E63 AMG	Erebus Motorsport
2016	International V8 Supercars Championship	5th	Holden VF Commodore	Tekno Autosports
2017	Virgin Australia Supercars Championship	15th	Holden VF Commodore	Tekno Autosports
2018	Virgin Australia Supercars Championship	15th	Ford FG X Falcon	23Red Racing
2019	Virgin Australia Supercars Championship	8th	Ford Mustang GT	23Red Racing
2020	Virgin Australia Supercars Championship	24th	Ford Mustang GT	23Red Racing; Tickford Racing
2021	Repco Supercars Championship	4th	Ford Mustang GT	Dick Johnson Racing
2022	Repco Supercars Championship	5th	Ford Mustang GT	Dick Johnson Racing
2023	Repco Supercars Championship	10th	Ford Mustang GT S650	Dick Johnson Racing
2024	Repco Supercars Championship	9th	Ford Mustang GT S650	Dick Johnson Racing

=== Complete Formula Renault 2.0 UK Championship results ===
(key)

Year	Entrant	1	2	3	4	5	6	7	8	9	10	11	12	13	DC	Points
2002	Motaworld Racing	BRH; 7	OUL; 6	THR; 3	SIL; 8	THR; 11	BRH; 6	CRO; 3	SNE; 4	SNE; 3	KNO; 10	BRH; Ret	DON; 5	DON; 6	4th	222

=== Complete British Formula Three Championship results ===
(key)

Year	Entrant	Chassis	Engine	1	2	3	4	5	6	7	8	9	10	11	12	13	14	15	16	17	18	19	20	21	22	23	24	25	DC	Points
2003	Alan Docking Racing	Dallara F303	Mugen-Honda	DON; 1; 12	DON; 2; 12	SNE; 1; 22	SNE; 2 Ret	**CRO**; **1**; 1	CRO; 2 Ret	KNO; 1; 5	KNO; 2; 5	SIL; 1; 4	SIL; 2; 7	CAS; 1 Ret	CAS; 2; 16	OUL; 1; 5	OUL; 2; 8	ROC; 1; 9	ROC; 2 Ret	THR; 1 Ret	THR; 2; 7								8th	103
2003	Menu F3 Motorsport	Dallara F303	Opel Spiess																			SPA; 1; 14	SPA; 2; 11	DON; 1; 4	DON; 2; 7	BRH; 1; 2	BRH; 2; 7		8th	103
2004	Menu F3 Motorsport	Dallara F304	Opel	DON; 1; 14	DON; 2; 3	SIL; 1; 10	SIL; 2 C	CRO; 1; 3	CRO; 2; 2	KNO; 1 Ret	KNO; 2; 7	SNE; 1; 13	SNE; 2; 8	SNE; 3; 10	CAS; 1	CAS; 2	DON; 1	DON; 2	OUL; 1	OUL; 2	SIL; 3	SIL; 4	THR; 1	THR; 2	SPA; 1	SPA; 2	BRH; 1	BRH; 2	13th	48

=== Complete A1 Grand Prix results ===
(key) (Races in bold indicate pole position) (Races in italics indicate fastest lap)

Year	Entrant	1	2	3	4	5	6	7	8	9	10	11	12	13	14	15	16	17	18	19	20	21	22	DC	Points
2005–06	Australia	GBR; SPR	GBR; FEA	GER; SPR	GER; FEA	POR; SPR; Ret	POR; FEA; 6	AUS; SPR; 11	AUS; FEA; 6	MYS; SPR; Ret	MYS; FEA; 11	UAE; SPR; 21	UAE; FEA; 10	RSA; SPR; 9	RSA; FEA; Ret	IDN; SPR	IDN; FEA	MEX; SPR	MEX; FEA	USA; SPR	USA; FEA	CHN; SPR	CHN; FEA	13th	51

=== Super2 Series results ===
Super2 Series results
Year	Team	No.	Car	1	2	3	4	5	6	7	8	9	10	11	12	13	14	15	16	17	18	Position	Points
2005	Dick Johnson Racing	19	Ford AU Falcon	ADE; R1	ADE; R2	WAK; R3	WAK; R4	WAK; R5	EAS; R6	EAS; R7	EAS; R8	QLD; R9; 2	QLD; R10; 3	QLD; R11; 2	MAL; R12	MAL; R13	MAL; R14	BAT; R15	BAT; R16	PHI; R17	PHI; R18	28th	184

=== Supercars Championship results ===
Supercars results
Year	Team	No.	Car	1	2	3	4	5	6	7	8	9	10	11	12	13	14	15	16	17	18	19	20	21	22	23	24	25	26	27	28	29	30	31	32	33	34	35	36	37	38	39	Position	Points
2004	Team Dynamik	14	Holden Commodore VY	ADE; R1	ADE; R2	EAS; R3	PUK; R4	PUK; R5	PUK; R6	HDV; R7	HDV; R8	HDV; R9	BAR; R10	BAR; R11	BAR; R12	QLD; R13	WIN; R14; Ret	ORA; R15; DNS	ORA; R16; DSQ																								NC	0
2004	Team Dynamik	45	Holden Commodore VY																	SAN; R17; Ret	BAT; R18; Ret	SUR; R19	SUR; R20	SYM; R21	SYM; R22	SYM; R23	EAS; R24	EAS; R25	EAS; R26														NC	0
2005	Dick Johnson Racing	17	Ford BA Falcon	ADE; R1	ADE; R2	PUK; R3	PUK; R4	PUK; R5	BAR; R6	BAR; R7	BAR; R8	EAS; R9	EAS; R10	SHA; R11	SHA; R12	SHA; R13	HDV; R14	HDV; R15	HDV; R16	QLD; R17	ORA; R18	ORA; R19	SAN; R20; 18	BAT; R21; 19	SUR; R22	SUR; R23	SUR; R24	SYM; R25	SYM; R26	SYM; R27	PHI; R28	PHI; R29	PHI; R30										60th	124
2006	Dick Johnson Racing	18	Ford BA Falcon	ADE; R1; 14	ADE; R2; 13	PUK; R3; 18	PUK; R4; 8	PUK; R5; 28	BAR; R6; 16	BAR; R7; 22	BAR; R8; 16	WIN; R9; 14	WIN; R10; DSQ	WIN; R11; 23	HDV; R12; 13	HDV; R13; Ret	HDV; R14; 14	QLD; R15; 19	QLD; R16; 19	QLD; R17; 12	ORA; R18; 26	ORA; R19; 22	ORA; R20; 8	SAN; R21; 4	BAT; R22; Ret	SUR; R23; 14	SUR; R24; 19	SUR; R25; 17	SYM; R26; 9	SYM; R27; 6	SYM; R28; 12	BHR; R29; Ret	BHR; R30; Ret	BHR; R31; Ret	PHI; R32; 6	PHI; R33; 7	PHI; R34; Ret						19th	1943
2007	Dick Johnson Racing	18	Ford BF Falcon	ADE; R1; Ret	ADE; R2; 9	BAR; R3; 6	BAR; R4; 5	BAR; R5; 6	PUK; R6; 11	PUK; R7; 8	PUK; R8; 6	WIN; R9; Ret	WIN; R10; 14	WIN; R11; 9	EAS; R12; 14	EAS; R13; 9	EAS; R14; 10	HDV; R15; EX	HDV; R16; 7	HDV; R17; 7	QLD; R18; 6	QLD; R19; 5	QLD; R20; 4	ORA; R21; 6	ORA; R22; 8	ORA; R23; 16	SAN; R24; Ret	BAT; R25; 3	SUR; R26; 11	SUR; R27; 18	SUR; R28; 11	BHR; R29; 8	BHR; R30; 3	BHR; R31; 5	SYM; R32; 9	SYM; R33; 11	SYM; R34; 14	PHI; R35; 9	PHI; R36; 9	PHI; R37; 8			10th	343
2008	Dick Johnson Racing	18	Ford BF Falcon	ADE; R1; 7	ADE; R2; Ret	EAS; R3; 2	EAS; R4; 1	**EAS**; **R5**; **6**	HAM; R6; 9	HAM; R7; 22	HAM; R8; Ret	BAR; R9; 8	BAR; R10; 5	BAR; R11; 6	SAN; R12; Ret	SAN; R13; 11	SAN; R14; 7	HDV; R15; 8	HDV; R16; 10	HDV; R17; 5	QLD; R18; 6	QLD; R19; 5	QLD; R20; 5	WIN; R21; 2	WIN; R22; 1	**WIN**; **R23**; **4**	PHI; Q 2	PHI; R24; 3	BAT; R25; 6	SUR; R26; 7	SUR; R27; Ret	SUR; R28; R10	BHR; R29; Ret	BHR; R30; 10	BHR; R31; 6	SYM; R32; 4	SYM; R33; 5	SYM; R34; 6	ORA; R35; 10	ORA; R36; 15	ORA; R37; 21		5th	2495
2009	Holden Racing Team	22	Holden VE Commodore	ADE; R1; 3	ADE; R2; 2	HAM; R3; 4	HAM; R4; 7	WIN; R5; 7	WIN; R6; 5	SYM; R7; 4	SYM; R8; 2	HDV; R9; 3	HDV; R10; 18	TOW; R11; 2	TOW; R12; 4	**SAN**; **R13**; **1**	**SAN**; **R14**; **2**	QLD; R15; Ret	QLD; R16; 1	PHI; Q 3	PHI; R17; 1	BAT; R18; 1	SUR; R19; 3	SUR; R20; 3	SUR; R21; 21	SUR; R22; 10	PHI; R23; 2	PHI; R24; 11	BAR; R25; 5	BAR; R26; Ret	SYD; R27; 15	SYD; R28; 8											2nd	3044
2010	Holden Racing Team	22	Holden VE Commodore	YMC; R1; Ret	YMC; R2; 14	BHR; R3; 8	BHR; R4; 6	ADE; R5; 9	ADE; R6; 14	HAM; R7; Ret	HAM; R8; 5	QLD; R9; 15	QLD; R10; 16	WIN; R11; 22	WIN; R12; 18	HDV; R13; Ret	HDV; R14; 11	TOW; R15; 18	TOW; R16; 6	PHI; Q 6	PHI; R17; 28	BAT; R18; Ret	SUR; R19; Ret	SUR; R20; 7	SYM; R21; 22	SYM; R22; Ret	SAN; R23; 10	SAN; R24; Ret	SYD; R25; Ret	SYD; R26; Ret													22nd	1236
2011	Ford Performance Racing	6	Ford FG Falcon	YMC; R1; 12	YMC; R2; 16	ADE; R3; 9	**ADE**; **R4**; **7**	HAM; R5; 6	HAM; R6; 4	BAR; R7; 3	BAR; R8; 8	BAR; R9; 15	WIN; R10; 13	WIN; R11; 24	HID; R12; 5	HID; R13; 7	TOW; R14; 3	TOW; R15; 18	QLD; R16; 15	QLD; R17; 15	QLD; R18; 21	PHI; Q 1	**PHI**; **R19**; **3**	BAT; R20; 18	SUR; R21; 2	SUR; R22; 14	SYM; R23; 5	SYM; R24; 2	SAN; R25; 4	SAN; R26; 3	**SYD**; **R27**; **Ret**	**SYD**; **R28**; **Ret**											7th	2345
2012	Ford Performance Racing	6	Ford FG Falcon	ADE; R1; 2	ADE; R2; 1	SYM; R3; 1	SYM; R4; 3	HAM; R5; 1	**HAM**; **R6**; **3**	BAR; R7; 25	BAR; R8; 1	BAR; R9; 1	PHI; R10; Ret	PHI; R11; 1	**HID**; **R12**; **2**	**HID**; **R13**; **6**	TOW; R14; 12	TOW; R15; 3	QLD; R16; 6	**QLD**; **R17**; **4**	SMP; R18; 3	SMP; R19; 5	SAN; Q 27	SAN; R20; 17	**BAT**; **R21**; **24**	SUR; R22; 18	SUR; R23; 1	**YMC**; **R24**; **2**	**YMC**; **R25**; **2**	**YMC**; **R26**; **2**	WIN; R27; Ret	WIN; R28; 11	SYD; R29; 19	SYD; R30; 1									4th	3049
2013	Ford Performance Racing	6	Ford FG Falcon	ADE; R1; 2	ADE; R2; 6	SYM; R3; 6	SYM; R4; 5	SYM; R5; 6	PUK; R6; 7	PUK; R7; 2	PUK; R8; 1	PUK; R9; 5	BAR; R10; 14	BAR; R11; 5	BAR; R12; 4	COA; R13; 4	COA; R14; 9	COA; R15; 12	COA; R16; Ret	HID; R17; Ret	HID; R18; 4	HID; R19; 7	TOW; R20; 1	TOW; R21; 10	QLD; R22; 6	QLD; R23; 9	**QLD**; **R24**; **2**	WIN; R25; 6	WIN; R26; 7	WIN; R27; 6	SAN; QR; 1	**SAN**; **R28**; **3**	BAT; R29; 7	SUR; R30; 6	SUR; R31; 9	PHI; R32; 17	PHI; R33; 8	PHI; R34; 6	SYD; R35; 5	SYD; R36; 7			3rd	2799
2014	Erebus Motorsport	9	Mercedes-Benz E63 AMG	ADE; R1; 13	ADE; R2; 10	ADE; R3; Ret	SYM; R4; 7	SYM; R5; 23	SYM; R6; 4	WIN; R7; 6	WIN; R8; 8	WIN; R9; 18	PUK; R10; 5	PUK; R11; 18	PUK; R12; 18	PUK; R13; 7	BAR; R14; 7	BAR; R15; 18	BAR; R16; 24	HID; R17; Ret	HID; R18; 13	HID; R19; 16	TOW; R20; 3	TOW; R21; 16	TOW; R22; 10	QLD; R23; 7	QLD; R24; 14	QLD; R25; 18	SMP; R26; 7	SMP; R27; 5	SMP; R28; 11	SAN; QR; 18	SAN; R29; 21	BAT; R30; 4	SUR; R31; 20	SUR; R32; 20	PHI; R33; 11	PHI; R34; 14	PHI; R35; 6	**SYD**; **R36**; **Ret**	SYD; R37; 13	SYD; R38; 10	14th	1912
2015	Erebus Motorsport	9	Mercedes-Benz E63 AMG	ADE; R1; Ret	ADE; R2; DNS	ADE; R3; 19	SYM; R4; 17	SYM; R5; 7	SYM; R6; 23	BAR; R7; 7	BAR; R8; 9	BAR; R9; 1	WIN; R10; 13	WIN; R11; 7	WIN; R12; 24	HID; R13; 14	HID; R14; 19	HID; R15; 24	TOW; R16; 12	TOW; R17; 24	QLD; R18; 9	QLD; R19; 7	QLD; R20; 7	SMP; R21; 13	SMP; R22; 9	SMP; R23; 20	SAN; R24; 23	BAT; R25; 12	SUR; R26; 15	SUR; R27; 16	PUK; R28; Ret	PUK; R29; 13	PUK; R30; 16	PHI; R31; 15	PHI; R32; 17	PHI; R33; 12	SYD; R34; 13	SYD; R35; 11	SYD; R36; 18				15th	1672
2016	Tekno Autosports	19	Holden VF Commodore	ADE; R1; 11	ADE; R2; 9	ADE; R3; 15	SYM; R4; 3	SYM; R5; 1	PHI; R6; 16	PHI; R7; 9	BAR; R8; 4	BAR; R9; 10	WIN; R10; 6	WIN; R11; 17	HID; R12; 4	HID; R13; 4	TOW; R14; 5	TOW; R15; 11	QLD; R16; 7	QLD; R17; 17	SMP; R18; 21	SMP; R19; 26	SAN; QR; 10	SAN; R20; 3	BAT; R21; 1	SUR; R22; 16	SUR; R23; 13	PUK; R24; 10	PUK; R25; 6	PUK; R26; 8	PUK; R27; 13	SYD; R28; 7	SYD; R29; 8										5th	2589
2017	Tekno Autosports	19	Holden VF Commodore	ADE; R1; Ret	ADE; R2; 13	SYM; R3; Ret	SYM; R4; DNS	PHI; R5; 9	PHI; R6; Ret	BAR; R7; 8	BAR; R8; 5	WIN; R9; 5	WIN; R10; 9	HID; R11; 13	HID; R12; 11	TOW; R13; 19	TOW; R14; 8	QLD; R15; 17	QLD; R16; Ret	SMP; R17; 12	SMP; R18; 12	SAN; QR; 25	SAN; R19; 12	BAT; R20; 14	SUR; R21; 20	SUR; R22; 14	PUK; R23; 12	PUK; R24; 23	NEW; R25; 9	NEW; R26; 9													15th	1659
2018	23Red Racing	230	Ford FG X Falcon	ADE; R1; 8	ADE; R2; 12	MEL; R3; 25	MEL; R4; 14	MEL; R5; 8	MEL; R6; 10	SYM; R7; 18	SYM; R8; 22	PHI; R9; 8	PHI; R10; 21	BAR; R11; 7	BAR; R12; 20	WIN; R13; 11	WIN; R14; 13	HID; R15; 13	HID; R16; 14	TOW; R17; 9	TOW; R18; Ret	QLD; R19; 17	QLD; R20; 12	SMP; R21; 17	BEN; R22; 7	BEN; R23; 7	SAN; QR; 12	SAN; R24; 11	BAT; R25; 19	SUR; R26; 12	SUR; R27; C	PUK; R28; 20	PUK; R29; 19	NEW; R30; 16	NEW; R31; 20								15th	1927
2019	23Red Racing	23	Ford Mustang S550	ADE; R1; 4	ADE; R2; 8	MEL; R3; 4	MEL; R4; 6	MEL; R5; 10	MEL; R6; 5	SYM; R7; 19	SYM; R8; 14	PHI; R9; 10	PHI; R10; 4	BAR; R11; 6	BAR; R12; 8	WIN; R13; 12	WIN; R14; Ret	HID; R15; 12	HID; R16; 9	TOW; R17; 7	TOW; R18; 21	QLD; R19; 2	QLD; R20; 5	BEN; R21; Ret	BEN; R22; 2	PUK; R23; 9	PUK; R24; 13	BAT; R25; 10	SUR; R26; 7	SUR; R27; 7	SAN; QR; 4	SAN; R28; 6	NEW; R29; 13	NEW; R30; 15									8th	2495
2020	23Red Racing	23	Ford Mustang S550	ADE; R1; 5	ADE; R2; 4	MEL; R3; C	MEL; R4; C	MEL; R5; C	MEL; R6; C	SMP1; R7	SMP1; R8	SMP1; R9	SMP2; R10	SMP2; R11	SMP2; R12	HID1; R13	HID1; R14	HID1; R15	HID2; R16	HID2; R17	HID2; R18	TOW1; R19	TOW1; R20	TOW1; R21	TOW2; R22	TOW2; R23	TOW2; R24	BEN1; R25	BEN1; R26	BEN1; R27	BEN2; R28	BEN2; R29	BEN2; R30										24th	507
2020	Tickford Racing	6	Ford Mustang S550																															**BAT**; **R31**; **2**									24th	507
2021	Dick Johnson Racing	17	Ford Mustang S550	BAT1; R1; 3	BAT1; R2; 7	SAN; R3; 22	SAN; R4; 10	SAN; R5; 5	SYM; R6; 5	SYM; R7; 3	SYM; R8; 3	BEN; R9; 8	BEN; R10; 2	BEN; R11; 3	HID; R12; 14	**HID**; **R13**; **2**	**HID**; **R14**; **2**	TOW1; R15; 9	TOW1; R16; 4	TOW2; R17; 11	TOW2; R18; 4	TOW2; R19; 3	SMP1; R20; 7	SMP1; R21; 2	SMP1; R22; 5	SMP2; R23; 3	SMP2; R24; 4	SMP2; R25; 7	SMP3; R26; 7	SMP3; R27; 5	SMP3; R28; 12	SMP4; R29; 5	SMP4; R30; C	BAT2; R31; 10									4th	2389
2022	Dick Johnson Racing	17	Ford Mustang S550	SMP; R1; 4	SMP; R2; 7	SYM; R3; 2	SYM; R4; 16	**SYM**; **R5**; **2**	MEL; R6; 16	**MEL**; **R7**; **24**	MEL; R8; 2	**MEL**; **R9**; **2**	BAR; R10; 6	**BAR**; **R11**; **1**	BAR; R12; 3	WIN; R13; 11	WIN; R14; 14	WIN; R15; 10	**HID**; **R16**; **2**	HID; R17; 2	**HID**; **R18**; **4**	TOW; R19; 2	TOW; R20; 7	BEN; R21; 2	BEN; R22; 13	BEN; R23; 4	**SAN**; **R24**; **1**	SAN; R25; 15	**SAN**; **R26**; **2**	PUK; R27; 1	PUK; R28; 4	**PUK**; **R29**; **22**	BAT; R30; Ret	SUR; R31; 4	SUR; R32; 3	ADE; R33; 7	ADE; R34; 19						5th	2573
2023	Dick Johnson Racing	17	Ford Mustang S650	NEW; R1; 11	NEW; R2; 19	MEL; R3; 16	MEL; R4; 11	MEL; R5; 11	MEL; R6; 6	BAR; R7; 8	BAR; R8; 6	BAR; R9; 7	SYM; R10; 11	SYM; R11; 5	SYM; R12; 13	HID; R13; 3	HID; R14; 24	HID; R15; 8	TOW; R16; 10	TOW; R17; 21	SMP; R18; 16	SMP; R19; 17	BEN; R20; 9	BEN; R21; 22	BEN; R22; 6	SAN; R23; 7	BAT; R24; 16	SUR; R25; 15	SUR; R26; 16	ADE; R27; 7	ADE; R28; 9												10th	1786
2024	Dick Johnson Racing	17	Ford Mustang S650	BAT1; R1; 16	BAT1; R2; 10	MEL; R3; 14	MEL; R4; 5	MEL; R5; 14	MEL; R6; 6	TAU; R7; 2	TAU; R8; 19	BAR; R9; 23	BAR; R10; 4	HID; R11; 11	HID; R12; 7	TOW; R13; 8	TOW; R14; 12	SMP; R15; 4	**SMP**; **R16**; **6**	TAS; R17; 15	TAS; R18; 11	SAN; R19; 24	BAT; R20; 12	SUR; R21; 19	SUR; R22; 20	ADE; R23; 12	ADE; R24; 4																9th	1812
2025	Dick Johnson Racing	17	Ford Mustang S650	SYD; R1; 21	SYD; R2; 24	SYD; R3; 9	MEL; R4; 11	MEL; R5; 15	MEL; R6; 4	MEL; R7; C	TAU; R8; 10	TAU; R9; 2	TAU; R10; 9	SYM; R11; DSQ	SYM; R12; 21	SYM; R13; 17	BAR; R14; 14	BAR; R15; 10	BAR; R16; 16	HID; R17; 15	HID; R18; 16	HID; R19; 23	TOW; R20; 7	TOW; R21; 13	TOW; R22; 23	QLD; R23; 22	QLD; R24; 10	QLD; R25; 16	BEN; R26; 21	BAT; R27; Ret	SUR; R28; 13	SUR; R29; 20	SAN; R30; 11	SAN; R31; 14	ADE; R32; 10	ADE; R33; 17	ADE; R34; 13						20th	1171
2026	Grove Racing	19	Ford Mustang S650	SMP; R1	SMP; R2	SMP; R3	MEL; R4	MEL; R5	MEL; R6	MEL; R7	TAU; R8	TAU; R9	TAU; R10	CHR; R11	CHR; R12	CHR; R13	SYM; R14	SYM; R15	SYM; R16	BAR; R17	BAR; R18	BAR; R19	HID; R20	HID; R21	HID; R22	TOW; R23	TOW; R24	TOW; R25	QLD; R26	QLD; R27	QLD; R28	BEN; R29	BAT; R30	SUR; R31	SUR; R32	SAN; R33	SAN; R34	ADE; R35	ADE; R36	ADE; R37				

=== Complete Bathurst 1000 results ===
Year	Team	Car	Co-driver	Position	Laps
2004	Team Dynamik	Holden Commodore VY	(Australia) Dale Brede	DNF	49
2005	Dick Johnson Racing	Ford Falcon BA	(Australia) Steven Johnson	19th	133
2006	Dick Johnson Racing	Ford Falcon BA	(Australia) Steven Johnson	DNF	27
2007	Dick Johnson Racing	Ford Falcon BF	(Australia) Steven Johnson	**3rd**	161
2008	Dick Johnson Racing	Ford Falcon BF	(Australia) Steven Johnson	6th	161
2009	Holden Racing Team	Holden Commodore VE	(Australia) Garth Tander	**1st**	161
2010	Holden Racing Team	Holden Commodore VE	(Australia) David Reynolds	DNF	152
2011	Ford Performance Racing	Ford Falcon FG	(Australia) Luke Youlden	18th	161
2012	Ford Performance Racing	Ford Falcon FG	(New Zealand) John McIntyre	24th	143
2013	Ford Performance Racing	Ford Falcon FG	(Australia) Steve Owen	7th	161
2014	Erebus Motorsport	Mercedes-Benz E63 AMG	(Australia) Alex Davison	4th	161
2015	Erebus Motorsport	Mercedes-Benz E63 W212	(Australia) Alex Davison	12th	161
2016	Tekno Autosports	Holden Commodore VF	(Australia) Jonathon Webb	**1st**	161
2017	Tekno Autosports	Holden Commodore VF	(Australia) Jonathon Webb	14th	159
2018	23Red Racing	Ford Falcon FG X	(Australia) Alex Davison	19th	159
2019	23Red Racing	Ford Mustang S550	(Australia) Alex Davison	10th	161
2020	Tickford Racing	Ford Mustang S550	(Australia) Cam Waters	**2nd**	161
2021	Dick Johnson Racing	Ford Mustang S550	(Australia) Alex Davison	10th	161
2022	Dick Johnson Racing	Ford Mustang S550	(Australia) Alex Davison	DNF	141
2023	Dick Johnson Racing	Ford Mustang S650	(Australia) Alex Davison	16th	161
2024	Dick Johnson Racing	Ford Mustang S650	(Australia) Kai Allen	12th	161
2025	Dick Johnson Racing	Ford Mustang S650	(Australia) Tony D'Alberto	DNF	53

=== GT World Challenge Australia results ===
(key) (Races in bold indicate pole position) (Races in italics indicate fastest lap)

Year	Team	Car	Class	1	2	3	4	5	6	7	8	9	10	11	12	Pos.	Points
2026	OnlyFans Racing	Ferrari 296 GT3	Pro-Am	PHI; 1; 7	PHI; 2 Ret	BEN; 1; 5	BEN; 2; 12	QLD; 1; 1	QLD; 2; 8	HID; 1; 3	HID; 2; 8	SYD; 1; 8	SYD; 2; 5	ADL; 1	ADL; 2	9th*	80*

==== Complete Bathurst 12 Hour results ====
Year	Team	Co-drivers	Car	Class	Laps	Pos.	Class pos.
2014	(Australia) Erebus Motorsport	(Australia) Greg Crick (Australia) Jack Le Brocq	Mercedes-Benz SLS AMG	A	296	**3rd**	**3rd**
2016	(Australia) Tekno Autosports	(United Kingdom) Robert Bell (United Kingdom) Andrew Watson	McLaren 650S GT3	AP	292	9th	8th
2017	(Australia) Scott Taylor Motorsports	(Australia) Warren Luff (Australia) Tim Slade (Australia) Tony Walls	McLaren 650S GT3	APA	268	20th	6th
2018	(United States) Competition Motorsports	(Australia) David Calvert-Jones (United States) Patrick Long (Australia) Alex Davison	Porsche 911 GT3 R	APA	271	4th	**2nd**

=== Bathurst 6 Hour results ===
Year	Team	Co-drivers	Car	Class	Laps	Pos.	Class pos.
2022	(Australia) Bruce Lynton BMW	(Australia) Beric Lynton (Australia) Tim Leahey	BMW M3 F80	X	119	27th	8th
2023	(Australia) Bruce Lynton BMW	(Australia) Beric Lynton (Australia) Tim Leahey	BMW M3 F80	X	112	6th	6th
2024	(Australia) Bruce Lynton BMW	(Australia) Beric Lynton (Australia) Tim Leahey	BMW M3 F80	X	112	**3rd**	**3rd**
2025	(Australia) Bruce Lynton BMW	(Australia) Beric Lynton (Australia) Tim Leahey	BMW M3 F80	X	122	4th	**3rd**

Sporting positions
Preceded by Craig Lowndes; Jamie Whincup	Winner of the Bathurst 1000; 2009 (with Garth Tander)	Succeeded by Craig Lowndes; Mark Skaife
Preceded by Craig Lowndes; Steven Richards	Winner of the Bathurst 1000; 2016 (with Jonathon Webb)	Succeeded by David Reynolds; Luke Youlden
Preceded by Jamie Whincup	Winner of the Clipsal 500; 2012	Succeeded by Shane van Gisbergen
Awards and achievements
Preceded by Jamie Whincup	Barry Sheene Medal; 2009	Succeeded by James Courtney
