= 23Red Racing =

Defunct Australian motor racing team

- Team Principal: Phil Munday
- Debut: 2018
- Final Season: 2020
- Round wins: 0
- Pole positions: 0

23Red Racing was an Australian motor racing team that competed in the Supercars Championship. It fielded a single Tickford Racing-run Ford, driven by Will Davison. The team had also competed in the Porsche GT3 Cup Challenge Australia and planned to compete in the Super2 Series.

== History ==
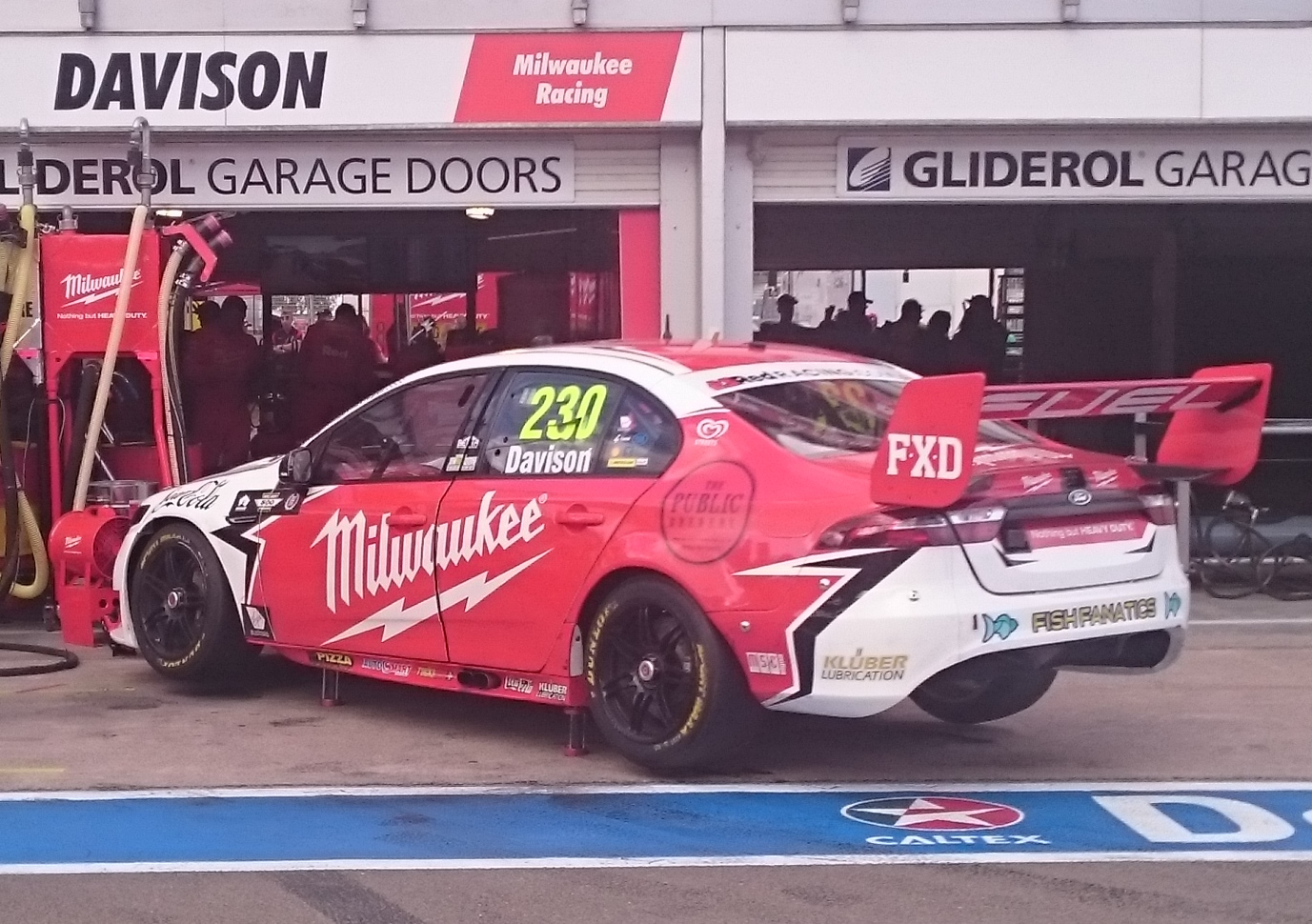
Will Davison drove a Ford Falcon FG X for 23Red Racing in the 2018 Supercars Championship.

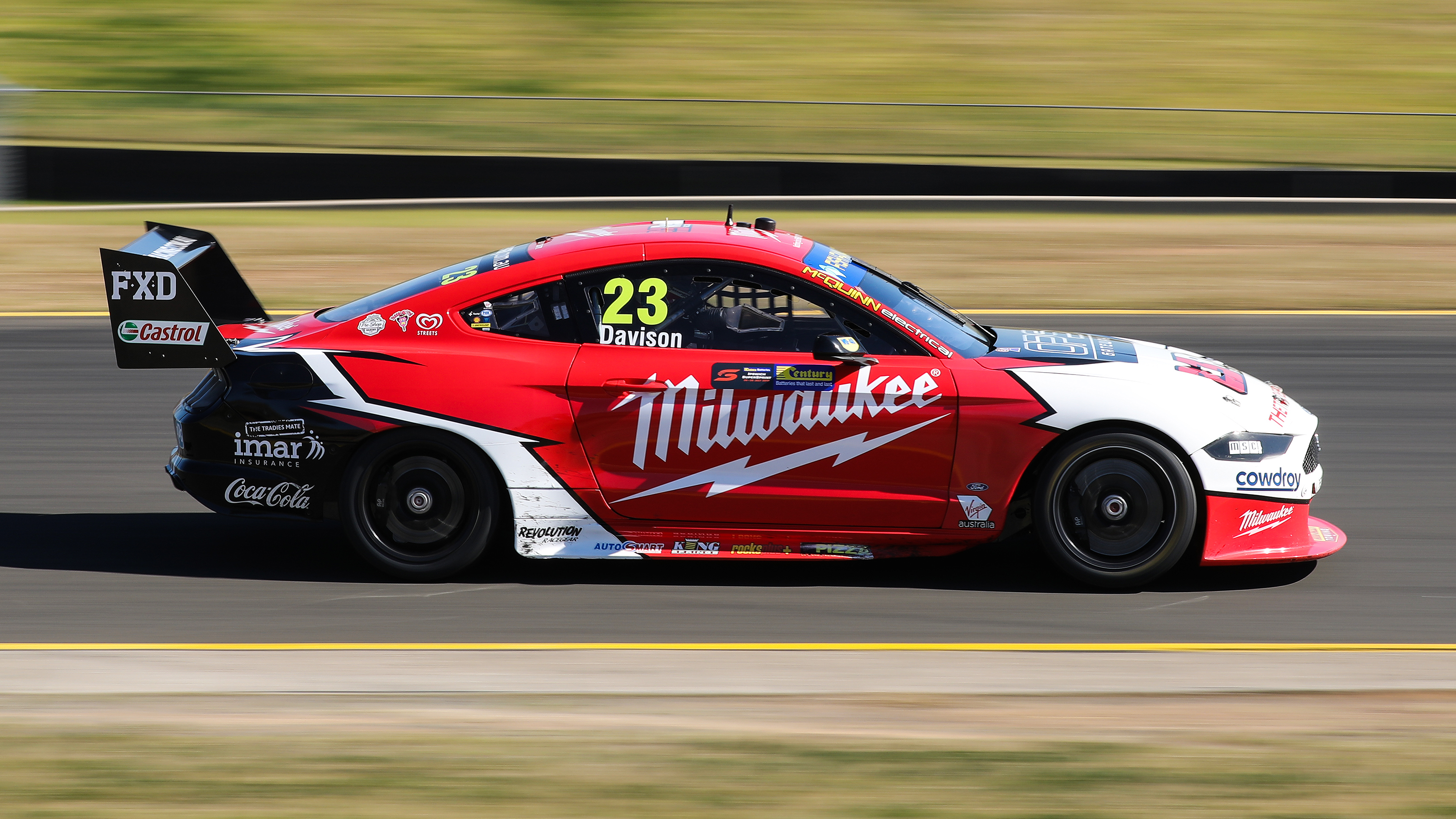
Will Davison driving the team's Ford Mustang GT at Sydney Motorsport Park in 2019.

=== Background and founding ===
Phil Munday has an extensive history in the panel industry with national stores across Australia and New Zealand, as well as being involved in various motor racing sponsorships. In 2017, Munday purchased a 60% stake of Lucas Dumbrell Motorsport with Lucas Dumbrell retaining 40%. The team was launched at the season-ending 2017 Coates Hire Newcastle 500. In April 2018, Munday bought out the remaining 40% of the team.

=== Supercars Championship ===
23Red Racing signed two-time Bathurst 1000 winner Will Davison as their inaugural driver, with title sponsorship from Milwaukee Tools. The team had a solid start to the 2018 Supercars Championship, with four top ten finishes for Davison in the first ten races. Davison finished 15th in the championship.

For 2019, 23Red Racing moved from being an independent operation to being run as a customer entry from the Tickford Racing stable, using the new Ford Mustang. The team took its first podium finish at the Ipswich SuperSprint, followed by another podium at The Bend SuperSprint.

=== GT3 Cup Challenge ===
23Red Racing entered the 2018 Porsche GT3 Cup Challenge Australia with Luis Leeds as the driver.

=== Collapse ===
Having contested the opening round of the 2020 Supercars Championship, the economic impact of the following COVID-19 pandemic led to the withdrawal of Milwaukee Tools and the financial collapse of the team in May 2020.

== Supercars Championship drivers ==
The following is a list of drivers who drove for the team in Supercars, in order of their first appearance. Drivers who only drove for the team on a part-time basis are listed in italics.

- (Australia) Will Davison (2018–20)
- (Australia) Alex Davison (2018–19)

== Results ==
=== Complete Bathurst 1000 results ===
Year	No.	Car	Drivers	Position	Laps
2018	230	Ford Falcon FG X	(Australia) Will Davison (Australia) Alex Davison	19th	159
2019	23	Ford Mustang Mk.6	(Australia) Will Davison (Australia) Alex Davison	10th	161
