= 2019 Melbourne 400 =

2019 V8 Supercar championship race

(Victoria (state)) 2019 Melbourne 400
Event Information
- Round 2 of 15 in the 2019 Supercars Championship
- Layout of the Melbourne Grand Prix Circuit
- Date: 14-17 March 2019
- Location: Melbourne, Victoria
- Venue: Melbourne Grand Prix Circuit
- Weather: Fine

Results
Race 1
Distance	25 laps	132.610 km
Pole position	(New Zealand) Scott McLaughlin; DJR Team Penske	1:53.828
Winner	(New Zealand) Scott McLaughlin; DJR Team Penske	50:01.240
Race 2
Distance	13 laps	68.957 km
Pole position	(New Zealand) Scott McLaughlin; DJR Team Penske	1:54.264
Winner	(New Zealand) Scott McLaughlin; DJR Team Penske	25:39.441
Race 3
Distance	25 laps	132.610 km
Pole position	(New Zealand) Scott McLaughlin; DJR Team Penske	1:53.999
Winner	(Australia) Chaz Mostert; Tickford Racing	51:50.000
Race 4
Distance	11 laps	58.348 km
Pole position	(Australia) Chaz Mostert; Tickford Racing	1:54.278
Winner	(New Zealand) Scott McLaughlin; DJR Team Penske	25:32.051

The 2019 Melbourne 400 (known for sponsorship purposes as the Beaurepaires Melbourne 400) was a motor racing event for the Supercars Championship held as a support event to the 2019 Australian Grand Prix from 14 March to 17 March 2019. It was held at the Melbourne Grand Prix Circuit and consisted of two races of 70 kilometres and two races of 130 kilometres. It was the second event of fifteen in the 2019 Supercars Championship and the second running of the Melbourne 400 event.

Tickford Racing's Chaz Mostert won the Larry Perkins Trophy for accumulating the most points over the weekend. The event saw the running of the 1,000th Australian Touring Car Championship race in Race 4, won by DJR Team Penske's Scott McLaughlin. McLaughlin claimed three pole positions and three race wins across the weekend, with the new-for-2019 Ford Mustang GT proving dominant. McLaughlin left the event continuing to hold his championship lead over Jamie Whincup by 31 points.

== Report ==
=== Background ===
This event was the second of fifteen in the 2019 Supercars Championship and the second running of the Melbourne 400. Defending series champion Scott McLaughlin held the championship lead entering the event after winning both races at the Adelaide 500.

=== Practice ===
Two 30-minute practice sessions were held prior to qualifying on Thursday. Chaz Mostert was fastest in the first session with a margin of 0.4s over Anton de Pasquale with a time of 1:55.5743s. The second session saw DJR Team Penske claim the first two positions with Scott McLaughlin setting a time of 1:54.5518, 0.2s faster than teammate Fabian Coulthard and 0.6s clear of Mostert.

=== Qualifying ===
Four 10-minute qualifying sessions were held to decide the grid for each race. Qualifying for Races 3 and 4 was held on Thursday afternoon with McLaughlin claiming pole position for both races. McLaughlin's time of 1:53.8280s in qualifying for Race 3 was a new Supercars lap record, beating teammate Fabian Coulthard's previous lap record by 0.6s. Mostert was left just 22nd in the first session after infringing track limits on his first flying lap. He recovered in qualifying for Race 4 to be second, 0.128s slower than McLaughlin's best time of 1:54.2643s. Jamie Whincup qualified 3rd, ahead of the Ford Mustangs of Cam Waters, Coulthard and Will Davison.

Qualifying for Races 5 and 6 was held early Friday afternoon. McLaughlin claimed his 50th career pole position for Race 5 with a time of 1:53.9990s, 0.5s clear of Waters. Shane van Gisbergen was left 12th after making a mistake at the penultimate corner on his second flying lap. Qualifying for Race 6 saw Mostert pip McLaughlin by 0.08s with a time of 1:54.2783s to claim his first pole position since the 2017 Vodafone Gold Coast 600. Whincup qualified 3rd ahead of Waters and van Gisbergen.

=== Race 3 ===
Race 3 was held on Friday afternoon and consisted of 130 kilometres and 25 laps. McLaughlin converted from his pole position to finish unchallenged ahead of Coulthard and Waters, leading home an all-Mustang top 5. Mostert recovered from his 22nd starting position to finish 5th ahead of the best placed Holden of Tim Slade and James Courtney. Van Gisbergen retired from the race after an engine failure while running fourth with four laps remaining.

A post-race investigation into a pitlane incident in which a tyre from Scott Pye's car was collected by Nick Percat during pitstops on lap 10 resulted in Walkinshaw Andretti United receiving a penalty of 30 team championship points and a fine of $3,000. Rick Kelly received a post-race 43-second time penalty, demoting him to 22nd, after his car was released from the pit bay into the path of James Golding.

=== Race 4 ===
Race 4 was held early Saturday afternoon and consisted of 70 kilometres and 13 laps. This race was notable as the 1,000th Australian Touring Car Championship race held. McLaughlin led from start to finish to continue his perfect streak of victories, with Mostert in second and Waters in third. Mostert started second but found himself fourth after passes by Waters and Whincup on the opening lap. He recovered to 2nd after passing Whincup on lap 4 and Waters on lap 9.

James Golding received a 5-second time penalty for failing to leave racing room for Andre Heimgartner at the end of the first lap. His Garry Rogers Motorsport teammate Richie Stanaway received the same penalty after a post-race investigation found him guilty of careless driving after contact with Lee Holdsworth. Todd Hazelwood was investigated for twice cutting the Turn 11/Turn 12 complex, but was cleared due to damage from contact with Percat.

=== Race 5 ===
Race 5 was held late Saturday afternoon and consisted of 130 kilometres and 25 laps. The race started in bizarre circumstances after an out-lap crash between polesitter McLaughlin and second-place qualifier Waters resulted in neither driver starting the race. The incident left Brad Jones Racing's Percat and Slade as the new highest-placed starters. Slade led from the line but was passed by Whincup at Turn 13 on the opening lap. Slade and Percat then made contact at Turn 15, resulting in Percat being escorted wide and falling to seventh. Whincup continued to extend his race lead while Slade fell under pressure from Mostert. Mostert undercut Slade during pitstops and began to pressure Whincup for the effective race lead, eventually passing on lap 14. Mostert continued to extend his lead until a Safety Car was called on lap 20 after van Gisbergen's car lost a wheel. Mostert held the race lead as the race restarted with four laps to go and won the race from Whincup and Slade. David Reynolds finished in fourth ahead of Coulthard and Walkinshaw Andretti United drivers Pye and Courtney. van Gisbergen was classified 22nd and 2 laps down after repairs to his car.

Triple Eight Race Engineering were fined $5,000 and docked 30 teams' championship points as a result of van Gisbergen's wheel loss. Will Davison received a 5 second time penalty, demoting him to 10th, for failing to leave racing room while battling James Golding at Turn 3 on lap 3. Incidents between Lee Holdsworth and Richie Stanaway were the subject of a post-race investigation. The two drivers first made contact on lap 1, with Stanaway then making contact with the rear of Holdsworth's car on lap 3. Stewards charged Stanaway with dangerous driving and he was disqualified, fined $10,000 and forced to start Race 6 from pitlane.

=== Race 6 ===
Race 6 was held on Sunday afternoon and consisted of 70 kilometres and 13 laps. The race did not meet the scheduled race distance due to time certainty and finished after 11 laps. The race was won by McLaughlin, leading from start to finish from second on the grid. Polesitter Mostert finished 2nd and Whincup finished 3rd. Van Gisbergen was given a 15-second time penalty after contact with Coulthard at Turn 13 on lap 2. Coulthard fell to 22nd after the contact, recovering to 15th position. The Safety Car was called after a crash between Garry Jacobson and Macauley Jones on lap 4. The accident occurred when Jones was attempting a pass on Simona de Silvestro. Overlap between the rear of Jones' car and the front of Jacobson's car caused Jones to spin into the wall. The race resumed on lap 7 with McLaughlin and Mostert building a comfortable lead over Whincup before the race finish. Mostert won the Larry Perkins Trophy for accumulating the most points over the weekend, with 2018 Larry Perkins Trophy winner Whincup second in the standings.

De Silvestro received a post-race penalty of 5 seconds for careless driving after a last corner pass on James Golding escorted him wide and caused him to hit the wall. Kelly Racing were also docked 50 teams' championship points after it was found in parc ferme that Rick Kelly's car did not have a SD card inserted in its judicial camera. Jacobson, meanwhile, was cleared of wrongdoing after a post-race investigation into the crash with Jones.

== Results ==
=== Practice ===
Practice summary
Session	Day	Fastest lap				
Session	Day	No.	Driver	Team	Car	Time
Practice 1	Thursday	55	(Australia) Chaz Mostert	Tickford Racing	Ford Mustang GT	1:55.5742
Practice 2	Thursday	17	(New Zealand) Scott McLaughlin	DJR Team Penske	Ford Mustang GT	1:54.5518

=== Race 3 ===
==== Qualifying ====
Pos.	No.	Driver	Team	Car	Time	Gap	Grid
1	17	(New Zealand) Scott McLaughlin	DJR Team Penske	Ford Mustang GT	1:53.8280		1
2	12	(New Zealand) Fabian Coulthard	DJR Team Penske	Ford Mustang GT	1:54.1894	+0.3614	2
3	6	(Australia) Cam Waters	Tickford Racing	Ford Mustang GT	1:54.4033	+0.5753	3
4	23	(Australia) Will Davison	23Red Racing	Ford Mustang GT	1:54.5222	+0.6942	4
5	97	(New Zealand) Shane van Gisbergen	Triple Eight Race Engineering	Holden Commodore ZB	1:54.5425	+0.7145	5
6	14	(Australia) Tim Slade	Brad Jones Racing	Holden Commodore ZB	1:54.6259	+0.7979	6
7	88	(Australia) Jamie Whincup	Triple Eight Race Engineering	Holden Commodore ZB	1:54.6352	+0.8072	7
8	8	(Australia) Nick Percat	Brad Jones Racing	Holden Commodore ZB	1:54.6495	+0.8215	8
9	22	(Australia) James Courtney	Walkinshaw Andretti United	Holden Commodore ZB	1:54.7917	+0.9637	9
10	18	(Australia) Mark Winterbottom	Team 18	Holden Commodore ZB	1:54.8920	+1.0640	10
11	99	(Australia) Anton de Pasquale	Erebus Motorsport	Holden Commodore ZB	1:54.9159	+1.0879	11
12	5	(Australia) Lee Holdsworth	Tickford Racing	Ford Mustang GT	1:54.9761	+1.1481	12
13	9	(Australia) David Reynolds	Erebus Motorsport	Holden Commodore ZB	1:55.0363	+1.2083	13
14	2	(Australia) Scott Pye	Walkinshaw Andretti United	Holden Commodore ZB	1:55.1899	+1.3619	14
15	7	(New Zealand) Andre Heimgartner	Kelly Racing	Nissan Altima L33	1:55.1958	+1.3678	15
16	34	(Australia) James Golding	Garry Rogers Motorsport	Holden Commodore ZB	1:55.2560	+1.4280	16
17	15	(Australia) Rick Kelly	Kelly Racing	Nissan Altima L33	1:55.2758	+1.4478	17
18	33	(New Zealand) Richie Stanaway	Garry Rogers Motorsport	Holden Commodore ZB	1:55.5238	+1.6958	18
19	35	(Australia) Todd Hazelwood	Matt Stone Racing	Holden Commodore ZB	1:55.6453	+1.8173	19
20	78	(Switzerland) Simona de Silvestro	Kelly Racing	Nissan Altima L33	1:55.6818	+1.8538	20
21	3	(Australia) Garry Jacobson	Kelly Racing	Nissan Altima L33	1:55.7423	+1.9143	21
22	55	(Australia) Chaz Mostert	Tickford Racing	Ford Mustang GT	1:56.0845	+2.2565	22
23	19	(Australia) Jack Le Brocq	Tekno Autosports	Holden Commodore ZB	1:56.7293	+2.9013	23
24	21	(Australia) Macauley Jones	Tim Blanchard Racing	Holden Commodore ZB	1:56.9507	+3.1227	24

==== Race ====
Pos.	No.	Driver	Team	Car	Laps	Time / Retired	Grid	Points
1	17	(New Zealand) Scott McLaughlin	DJR Team Penske	Ford Mustang GT	25	50:01.2406	1	100
2	12	(New Zealand) Fabian Coulthard	DJR Team Penske	Ford Mustang GT	25	+0.687	2	92
3	6	(Australia) Cam Waters	Tickford Racing	Ford Mustang GT	25	+4.619	3	86
4	23	(Australia) Will Davison	23Red Racing	Ford Mustang GT	25	+9.917	4	80
5	55	(Australia) Chaz Mostert	Tickford Racing	Ford Mustang GT	25	+11.558	22	74
6	14	(Australia) Tim Slade	Brad Jones Racing	Holden Commodore ZB	25	+15.820	6	68
7	22	(Australia) James Courtney	Walkinshaw Andretti United	Holden Commodore ZB	25	+21.760	9	64
8	88	(Australia) Jamie Whincup	Triple Eight Race Engineering	Holden Commodore ZB	25	+22.021	7	60
9	5	(Australia) Lee Holdsworth	Tickford Racing	Ford Mustang GT	25	+22.450	12	56
10	9	(Australia) David Reynolds	Erebus Motorsport	Holden Commodore ZB	25	+23.188	13	52
11	99	(Australia) Anton de Pasquale	Erebus Motorsport	Holden Commodore ZB	25	+23.796	11	48
12	18	(Australia) Mark Winterbottom	Team 18	Holden Commodore ZB	25	+27.770	10	46
13	2	(Australia) Scott Pye	Walkinshaw Andretti United	Holden Commodore ZB	25	+29.407	14	44
14	8	(Australia) Nick Percat	Brad Jones Racing	Holden Commodore ZB	25	+37.003	8	42
15	7	(New Zealand) Andre Heimgartner	Kelly Racing	Nissan Altima L33	25	+37.759	15	40
16	34	(Australia) James Golding	Garry Rogers Motorsport	Holden Commodore ZB	25	+38.964	16	38
17	34	(New Zealand) Richie Stanaway	Garry Rogers Motorsport	Holden Commodore ZB	25	+40.628	18	36
18	78	(Switzerland) Simona de Silvestro	Kelly Racing	Nissan Altima L33	25	+40.886	20	34
19	21	(Australia) Macauley Jones	Tim Blanchard Racing	Holden Commodore ZB	25	+56.277	24	32
20	19	(Australia) Jack Le Brocq	Tekno Autosports	Holden Commodore ZB	25	+56.797	23	30
21	3	(Australia) Garry Jacobson	Kelly Racing	Nissan Altima L33	25	+1:10.378	21	28
22	15	(Australia) Rick Kelly	Kelly Racing	Nissan Altima L33	25	+1:21.020^{1}	17	26
23	35	(Australia) Todd Hazelwood	Matt Stone Racing	Holden Commodore ZB	23	+2 laps	19	24
Ret	97	(New Zealand) Shane van Gisbergen	Triple Eight Race Engineering	Holden Commodore ZB	21	Engine	5	

Notes

- ^1 - Rick Kelly received a 43 second time penalty for an unsafe pit release.

=== Race 4 ===
==== Qualifying ====
Pos.	No.	Driver	Team	Car	Time	Gap	Grid
1	17	(New Zealand) Scott McLaughlin	DJR Team Penske	Ford Mustang GT	1:54.2643		1
2	55	(Australia) Chaz Mostert	Tickford Racing	Ford Mustang GT	1:54.2771	+0.0128	2
3	88	(Australia) Jamie Whincup	Triple Eight Race Engineering	Holden Commodore ZB	1:54.3431	+0.0788	3
4	6	(Australia) Cam Waters	Tickford Racing	Ford Mustang GT	1:54.4909	+0.2266	4
5	12	(New Zealand) Fabian Coulthard	DJR Team Penske	Ford Mustang GT	1:54.5065	+0.2422	5
6	23	(Australia) Will Davison	23Red Racing	Ford Mustang GT	1:54.5164	+0.2521	6
7	9	(Australia) David Reynolds	Erebus Motorsport	Holden Commodore ZB	1:54.6336	+0.3693	7
8	99	(Australia) Anton de Pasquale	Erebus Motorsport	Holden Commodore ZB	1:54.6667	+0.4024	8
9	14	(Australia) Tim Slade	Brad Jones Racing	Holden Commodore ZB	1:54.6819	+0.4176	9
10	18	(Australia) Mark Winterbottom	Team 18	Holden Commodore ZB	1:54.6938	+0.4295	10
11	97	(New Zealand) Shane van Gisbergen	Triple Eight Race Engineering	Holden Commodore ZB	1:54.8335	+0.5692	11
12	5	(Australia) Lee Holdsworth	Tickford Racing	Ford Mustang GT	1:54.9105	+0.6462	12
13	22	(Australia) James Courtney	Walkinshaw Andretti United	Holden Commodore ZB	1:54.9710	+0.7067	13
14	8	(Australia) Nick Percat	Brad Jones Racing	Holden Commodore ZB	1:54.9854	+0.7211	14
15	15	(Australia) Rick Kelly	Kelly Racing	Nissan Altima L33	1:55.0479	+0.7836	15
16	2	(Australia) Scott Pye	Walkinshaw Andretti United	Holden Commodore ZB	1:55.2075	+0.9432	16
17	7	(New Zealand) Andre Heimgartner	Kelly Racing	Nissan Altima L33	1:55.3512	+1.0869	17
18	34	(Australia) James Golding	Garry Rogers Motorsport	Holden Commodore ZB	1:55.4762	+1.2119	18
19	35	(Australia) Todd Hazelwood	Matt Stone Racing	Holden Commodore ZB	1:55.5880	+1.3237	19
20	33	(New Zealand) Richie Stanaway	Garry Rogers Motorsport	Holden Commodore ZB	1:55.5966	+1.3323	20
21	78	(Switzerland) Simona de Silvestro	Kelly Racing	Nissan Altima L33	1:55.8468	+1.5825	21
22	3	(Australia) Garry Jacobson	Kelly Racing	Nissan Altima L33	1:55.9708	+1.7065	22
23	19	(Australia) Jack Le Brocq	Tekno Autosports	Holden Commodore ZB	1:56.1278	+1.8635	23
24	21	(Australia) Macauley Jones	Tim Blanchard Racing	Holden Commodore ZB	1:56.5407	+2.2764	24

==== Race ====
Pos.	No.	Driver	Team	Car	Laps	Time / Retired	Grid	Points
1	17	(New Zealand) Scott McLaughlin	DJR Team Penske	Ford Mustang GT	13	25:39.4415	1	50
2	55	(Australia) Chaz Mostert	Tickford Racing	Ford Mustang GT	13	+2.522	2	46
3	6	(Australia) Cam Waters	Tickford Racing	Ford Mustang GT	13	+6.410	4	43
4	88	(Australia) Jamie Whincup	Triple Eight Race Engineering	Holden Commodore ZB	13	+7.312	3	40
5	12	(New Zealand) Fabian Coulthard	DJR Team Penske	Ford Mustang GT	13	+10.821	5	37
6	23	(Australia) Will Davison	23Red Racing	Ford Mustang GT	13	+11.390	6	34
7	9	(Australia) David Reynolds	Erebus Motorsport	Holden Commodore ZB	13	+13.168	7	32
8	14	(Australia) Tim Slade	Brad Jones Racing	Holden Commodore ZB	13	+13.869	9	30
9	22	(Australia) James Courtney	Walkinshaw Andretti United	Holden Commodore ZB	13	+17.210	13	28
10	97	(New Zealand) Shane van Gisbergen	Triple Eight Race Engineering	Holden Commodore ZB	13	+17.406	11	26
11	18	(Australia) Mark Winterbottom	Team 18	Holden Commodore ZB	13	+18.585	10	24
12	5	(Australia) Lee Holdsworth	Tickford Racing	Ford Mustang GT	13	+21.558	12	23
13	99	(Australia) Anton de Pasquale	Erebus Motorsport	Holden Commodore ZB	13	+23.542	8	22
14	2	(Australia) Scott Pye	Walkinshaw Andretti United	Holden Commodore ZB	13	+24.097	16	21
15	8	(Australia) Nick Percat	Brad Jones Racing	Holden Commodore ZB	13	+24.719	14	20
16	15	(Australia) Rick Kelly	Kelly Racing	Nissan Altima L33	13	+25.676	15	19
17	35	(Australia) Todd Hazelwood	Matt Stone Racing	Holden Commodore ZB	13	+28.846	19	18
18	7	(New Zealand) Andre Heimgartner	Kelly Racing	Nissan Altima L33	13	+29.711	17	17
19	78	(Switzerland) Simona de Silvestro	Kelly Racing	Nissan Altima L33	13	+35.677	21	16
20	19	(Australia) Jack Le Brocq	Tekno Autosports	Holden Commodore ZB	13	+37.513	23	15
21	33	(New Zealand) Richie Stanaway	Garry Rogers Motorsport	Holden Commodore ZB	13	+40.239^{1}	20	14
22	21	(Australia) Macauley Jones	Tim Blanchard Racing	Holden Commodore ZB	13	+41.045	24	13
23	34	(Australia) James Golding	Garry Rogers Motorsport	Holden Commodore ZB	13	+41.608^{2}	18	12
24	3	(Australia) Garry Jacobson	Kelly Racing	Nissan Altima L33	13	+43.107	22	11

Notes

- ^1 - Richie Stanaway received a 5 second time penalty for careless driving.
- ^2 - James Golding received a 5 second time penalty for careless driving.

=== Race 5 ===
==== Qualifying ====
Pos.	No.	Driver	Team	Car	Time	Gap	Grid
1	17	(New Zealand) Scott McLaughlin	DJR Team Penske	Ford Mustang GT	1:53.9990		1
2	6	(Australia) Cam Waters	Tickford Racing	Ford Mustang GT	1:54.5214	+0.5224	2
3	14	(Australia) Tim Slade	Brad Jones Racing	Holden Commodore ZB	1:54.5883	+0.5893	3
4	8	(Australia) Nick Percat	Brad Jones Racing	Holden Commodore ZB	1:54.6145	+0.6155	4
5	12	(New Zealand) Fabian Coulthard	DJR Team Penske	Ford Mustang GT	1:54.6356	+0.6366	5
6	88	(Australia) Jamie Whincup	Triple Eight Race Engineering	Holden Commodore ZB	1:54.6426	+0.6436	6
7	55	(Australia) Chaz Mostert	Tickford Racing	Ford Mustang GT	1:54.6526	+0.6536	7
8	99	(Australia) Anton de Pasquale	Erebus Motorsport	Holden Commodore ZB	1:54.7679	+0.7689	8
9	9	(Australia) David Reynolds	Erebus Motorsport	Holden Commodore ZB	1:54.7876	+0.7886	9
10	22	(Australia) James Courtney	Walkinshaw Andretti United	Holden Commodore ZB	1:54.9721	+0.9731	10
11	18	(Australia) Mark Winterbottom	Team 18	Holden Commodore ZB	1:55.0520	+1.0530	11
12	23	(Australia) Will Davison	23Red Racing	Ford Mustang GT	1:55.0745	+1.0755	12
13	97	(New Zealand) Shane van Gisbergen	Triple Eight Race Engineering	Holden Commodore ZB	1:55.1722	+1.1732	13
14	5	(Australia) Lee Holdsworth	Tickford Racing	Ford Mustang GT	1:55.2191	+1.2201	14
15	34	(Australia) James Golding	Garry Rogers Motorsport	Holden Commodore ZB	1:55.2763	+1.2773	15
16	33	(New Zealand) Richie Stanaway	Garry Rogers Motorsport	Holden Commodore ZB	1:55.3268	+1.3278	16
17	7	(New Zealand) Andre Heimgartner	Kelly Racing	Nissan Altima L33	1:55.4065	+1.4075	17
18	2	(Australia) Scott Pye	Walkinshaw Andretti United	Holden Commodore ZB	1:55.5361	+1.5371	18
19	15	(Australia) Rick Kelly	Kelly Racing	Nissan Altima L33	1:55.7205	+1.7215	19
20	3	(Australia) Garry Jacobson	Kelly Racing	Nissan Altima L33	1:55.8368	+1.8378	20
21	35	(Australia) Todd Hazelwood	Matt Stone Racing	Holden Commodore ZB	1:55.8597	+1.8607	21
22	19	(Australia) Jack Le Brocq	Tekno Autosports	Holden Commodore ZB	1:55.9853	+1.9863	22
23	78	(Switzerland) Simona de Silvestro	Kelly Racing	Nissan Altima L33	1:56.1160	+2.1170	23
24	21	(Australia) Macauley Jones	Tim Blanchard Racing	Holden Commodore ZB	1:56.2222	+2.2232	24

==== Race ====
Pos.	No.	Driver	Team	Car	Laps	Time / Retired	Grid	Points
1	55	(Australia) Chaz Mostert	Tickford Racing	Ford Mustang GT	25	51:50.0007	7	100
2	88	(Australia) Jamie Whincup	Triple Eight Race Engineering	Holden Commodore ZB	25	+1.211	6	92
3	14	(Australia) Tim Slade	Brad Jones Racing	Holden Commodore ZB	25	+1.908	3	86
4	9	(Australia) David Reynolds	Erebus Motorsport	Holden Commodore ZB	25	+2.388	9	80
5	12	(New Zealand) Fabian Coulthard	DJR Team Penske	Ford Mustang GT	25	+3.641	5	74
6	2	(Australia) Scott Pye	Walkinshaw Andretti United	Holden Commodore ZB	25	+4.895	18	68
7	22	(Australia) James Courtney	Walkinshaw Andretti United	Holden Commodore ZB	25	+8.658	10	64
8	8	(Australia) Nick Percat	Brad Jones Racing	Holden Commodore ZB	25	+9.493	4	60
9	7	(New Zealand) Andre Heimgartner	Kelly Racing	Nissan Altima L33	25	+9.982	17	56
10	23	(Australia) Will Davison	23Red Racing	Ford Mustang GT	25	+10.270^{1}	13	52
11	99	(Australia) Anton de Pasquale	Erebus Motorsport	Holden Commodore ZB	25	+10.304	8	48
12	5	(Australia) Lee Holdsworth	Tickford Racing	Ford Mustang GT	25	+10.685	14	46
13	18	(Australia) Mark Winterbottom	Team 18	Holden Commodore ZB	25	+10.853	11	44
14	35	(Australia) Todd Hazelwood	Matt Stone Racing	Holden Commodore ZB	25	+11.371	21	42
15	19	(Australia) Jack Le Brocq	Tekno Autosports	Holden Commodore ZB	25	+12.233	22	40
16	15	(Australia) Rick Kelly	Kelly Racing	Nissan Altima L33	25	+12.577	19	38
17	78	(Switzerland) Simona de Silvestro	Kelly Racing	Nissan Altima L33	25	+12.928	23	36
18	34	(Australia) James Golding	Garry Rogers Motorsport	Holden Commodore ZB	25	+13.693	15	34
19	3	(Australia) Garry Jacobson	Kelly Racing	Nissan Altima L33	25	+16.147	20	32
20	21	(Australia) Macauley Jones	Tim Blanchard Racing	Holden Commodore ZB	25	+16.750	24	30
21	97	(New Zealand) Shane van Gisbergen	Triple Eight Race Engineering	Holden Commodore ZB	23	+2 laps	13	28
DNS	17	(New Zealand) Scott McLaughlin	DJR Team Penske	Ford Mustang GT		Accident	1	
DNS	6	(Australia) Cam Waters	Tickford Racing	Ford Mustang GT		Accident	2	
DSQ	33	(New Zealand) Richie Stanaway	Garry Rogers Motorsport	Holden Commodore ZB		^{[note 2]}	16	

Notes

- ^1 - Will Davison received a five second time penalty for failing to leave racing room.
- ^2 - Richie Stanaway was disqualified, fined $10,000 and forced to start Race 6 from pitlane for dangerous driving.

=== Race 6 ===
==== Qualifying ====
Pos.	No.	Driver	Team	Car	Time	Gap	Grid
1	55	(Australia) Chaz Mostert	Tickford Racing	Ford Mustang GT	1:54.2783		1
2	17	(New Zealand) Scott McLaughlin	DJR Team Penske	Ford Mustang GT	1:54.3655	+0.0872	2
3	88	(Australia) Jamie Whincup	Triple Eight Race Engineering	Holden Commodore ZB	1:54.6318	+0.3535	3
4	6	(Australia) Cam Waters	Tickford Racing	Ford Mustang GT	1:54.6870	+0.4087	4
5	97	(New Zealand) Shane van Gisbergen	Triple Eight Race Engineering	Holden Commodore ZB	1:54.7325	+0.4542	5
6	23	(Australia) Will Davison	23Red Racing	Ford Mustang GT	1:54.7485	+0.4702	6
7	18	(Australia) Mark Winterbottom	Team 18	Holden Commodore ZB	1:54.7861	+0.5079	7
8	12	(New Zealand) Fabian Coulthard	DJR Team Penske	Ford Mustang GT	1:54.8054	+0.5271	8
9	14	(Australia) Tim Slade	Brad Jones Racing	Holden Commodore ZB	1:54.8225	+0.5442	9
10	5	(Australia) Lee Holdsworth	Tickford Racing	Ford Mustang GT	1:54.8880	+0.6097	10
11	22	(Australia) James Courtney	Walkinshaw Andretti United	Holden Commodore ZB	1:55.1230	+0.8448	11
12	9	(Australia) David Reynolds	Erebus Motorsport	Holden Commodore ZB	1:55.1259	+0.8476	12
13	8	(Australia) Nick Percat	Brad Jones Racing	Holden Commodore ZB	1:55.1850	+0.9067	13
14	99	(Australia) Anton de Pasquale	Erebus Motorsport	Holden Commodore ZB	1:55.2818	+1.0036	14
15	2	(Australia) Scott Pye	Walkinshaw Andretti United	Holden Commodore ZB	1:55.3054	+1.0271	15
16	35	(Australia) Todd Hazelwood	Matt Stone Racing	Holden Commodore ZB	1:55.5176	+1.2393	16
17	33	(New Zealand) Richie Stanaway	Garry Rogers Motorsport	Holden Commodore ZB	1:55.5585	+1.2802	17
18	15	(Australia) Rick Kelly	Kelly Racing	Nissan Altima L33	1:55.6003	+1.322	18
19	3	(Australia) Garry Jacobson	Kelly Racing	Nissan Altima L33	1:55.8245	+1.5462	19
20	78	(Switzerland) Simona de Silvestro	Kelly Racing	Nissan Altima L33	1:56.1404	+1.8621	20
21	19	(Australia) Jack Le Brocq	Tekno Autosports	Holden Commodore ZB	1:56.2236	+1.9453	21
22	21	(Australia) Macauley Jones	Tim Blanchard Racing	Holden Commodore ZB	1:56.4680	+2.1897	22
23	34	(Australia) James Golding	Garry Rogers Motorsport	Holden Commodore ZB	1:57.8092	+3.531	23
24	7	(New Zealand) Andre Heimgartner	Kelly Racing	Nissan Altima L33	1:59.8343	+5.556	24

==== Race ====
Pos.	No.	Driver	Team	Car	Laps	Time / Retired	Grid	Points
1	17	(New Zealand) Scott McLaughlin	DJR Team Penske	Ford Mustang GT	11^{1}	25:32.052	2	50
2	55	(Australia) Chaz Mostert	Tickford Racing	Ford Mustang GT	11	+0.804	1	46
3	88	(Australia) Jamie Whincup	Triple Eight Race Engineering	Holden Commodore ZB	11	+3.833	3	43
4	6	(Australia) Cam Waters	Tickford Racing	Ford Mustang GT	11	+5.064	4	40
5	23	(Australia) Will Davison	23Red Racing	Ford Mustang GT	11	+5.446	6	37
6	18	(Australia) Mark Winterbottom	Team 18	Holden Commodore ZB	11	+8.298	7	34
7	14	(Australia) Tim Slade	Brad Jones Racing	Holden Commodore ZB	11	+9.007	9	32
8	9	(Australia) David Reynolds	Erebus Motorsport	Holden Commodore ZB	11	+10.891	12	30
9	5	(Australia) Lee Holdsworth	Tickford Racing	Ford Mustang GT	11	+11.000	10	28
10	8	(Australia) Nick Percat	Brad Jones Racing	Holden Commodore ZB	11	+11.615	13	26
11	2	(Australia) Scott Pye	Walkinshaw Andretti United	Holden Commodore ZB	11	+12.223	15	24
12	99	(Australia) Anton de Pasquale	Erebus Motorsport	Holden Commodore ZB	11	+13.149	14	23
13	35	(Australia) Todd Hazelwood	Matt Stone Racing	Holden Commodore ZB	11	+16.198	16	22
14	7	(New Zealand) Andre Heimgartner	Kelly Racing	Nissan Altima L33	11	+20.385	23	21
15	12	(New Zealand) Fabian Coulthard	DJR Team Penske	Ford Mustang GT	11	+20.566	8	20
16	22	(Australia) James Courtney	Walkinshaw Andretti United	Holden Commodore ZB	11	+21.190	11	19
17	3	(Australia) Garry Jacobson	Kelly Racing	Nissan Altima L33	11	+21.888	18	18
18	34	(Australia) James Golding	Garry Rogers Motorsport	Holden Commodore ZB	11	+22.604	22	17
19	15	(Australia) Rick Kelly	Kelly Racing	Nissan Altima L33	11	+23.479	17	16
20	33	(New Zealand) Richie Stanaway	Garry Rogers Motorsport	Holden Commodore ZB	11	+25.498	24	15
21	78	(Switzerland) Simona de Silvestro	Kelly Racing	Nissan Altima L33	11	+26.759^{2}	19	14
22	97	(New Zealand) Shane van Gisbergen	Triple Eight Race Engineering	Holden Commodore ZB	11	+28.715^{3}	5	13
23	19	(Australia) Jack Le Brocq	Tekno Autosports	Holden Commodore ZB	11	+1:28.170	20	12
Ret	21	(Australia) Macauley Jones	Tim Blanchard Racing	Holden Commodore ZB	2	Accident	21	

Notes

- ^1 - Race shortened to 11 laps due to time certainty.
- ^2 - Simona de Silvestro received a 5-second time penalty for careless driving.
- ^3 - Shane van Gisbergen received a 15-second time penalty for contact with Fabian Coulthard.
