= 2007 Adelaide 500 =

2007 Supercar Championship event

(South Australia) 2007 Adelaide 500
Event Information
- Round 1 of 14 in the 2007 V8 Supercar Championship Series
- Date: 1–4 March 2007
- Location: Adelaide, South Australia
- Venue: Adelaide Street Circuit
- Weather: Fine

Results
Race 1
Distance	78 laps	250 km
Pole position	James Courtney; Stone Brothers Racing	1:22.3584
Winner	Todd Kelly; Holden Racing Team	1:50:40.5932
Race 2
Distance	78 laps	250 km
Winner	Rick Kelly; HSV Dealer Team	1:58:54.1927
Round Results
First	Rick Kelly; HSV Dealer Team	58 pts
Second	Todd Kelly; Holden Racing Team	66 pts
Third	James Courtney; Stone Brothers Racing	55 pts

The 2007 Adelaide 500, known for naming rights reasons as the 2007 Clipsal 500, was the first race of the 2007 V8 Supercar season. It was held on the weekend of 1 to 4 March around the inner streets of Adelaide, the capital of South Australia. The Adelaide 500 is a unique event where the round results are determined by the results from the 2nd race, rather that the driver with the most points from the weekend. This means, as was the case in the 2006 round, that the winner of the round doesn't necessarily lead the championship after the event.

== Qualifying ==
The event was the first run under the new 2007 qualifying rules, in which the one-hour session is split into three 'knock out' parts. The first major eliminations occurred in the second part when Mark Skaife and defending champion Rick Kelly were eliminated. The front row of the grid for the first race was an all Ford row, with James Courtney from Stone Brothers Racing taking pole and Team Vodafone's Jamie Whincup taking second.

== Race 1 ==
Race 1 was held on Saturday 3 March 2007. The race began with Cameron McConville spinning at the Senna Chicane on the first lap after colliding with Andrew Jones. Team BOC also had problems with Brad Jones losing his front left wheel and brake assembly on lap 11.

John Bowe had a bad start to the year with his new team after running wide at the end of the main straight and clipping the tyre barrier. This destroyed the front right suspension on the car causing his retirement on lap 16.

On lap 48, Craig Lowndes was given a drive through penalty for contact with Max Wilson at turn 4. The remainder of the race was uneventful, with Todd Kelly winning the race from James Courtney and Jamie Whincup in third.

== Race 2 ==
Rick Kelly celebrates his win in Race 2.

Race 2 was run on Sunday 4 March. The race began with James Courtney having another bad start and dropping from 2nd to 10th after the first lap. Alan Gurr from Irwin Racing and Lee Holdsworth from Garry Rogers Motorsport collided at turn 5 on the first lap causing Gurr to retire from the race and Steve Owen from Autobarn Racing hit the concrete wall on the outside of turn 8 causing his retirement from the race. These incidents cause the first safety car of the weekend.

Following from the restart, Jack Perkins had engine problems, stalling at turn 11 and being hit by Paul Dumbrell causing his retirement and a penalty to Dumbrell which caused the second safety car on lap 8. After the pit lane opened for the compulsory stops, a collision occurred between Todd Kelly and Garth Tander causing Tander to be given a drive through penalty.

The remainder of the race was relatively incident free, with only minor collisions between drivers, until lap 64 when Jason Bargwanna stopped on the track with an electrical problem causing the safety car to be deployed for the third time. This bunched the field up, causing an 18 lap sprint to the finish with Todd Kelly leading from his brother Rick. On lap 68, Todd Kelly made a small mistake in turn 7 allowing Rick past and into the lead. This is how the race finished with Rick Kelly winning, from Todd Kelly and James Courtney in third.

== Results ==
=== Qualifying ===
Pos.	No.	Name	Team	Vehicle	Part 1	Part 2	Part 3	Grid
1	4	(Australia) James Courtney	Stone Brothers Racing	Ford Falcon (BF)	1:22.3802	1:22.4721	1:22.3584	1
2	88	(Australia) Jamie Whincup	Triple Eight Race Engineering	Ford Falcon (BF)	1:22.9977	1:22.8174	1:22.4712	2
3	16	(Australia) Garth Tander	HSV Dealer Team	Holden Commodore (VE)	1:22.5907	1:22.6255	1:22.5496	3
4	5	(Australia) Mark Winterbottom	Ford Performance Racing	Ford Falcon (BF)	1:22.7173	1:22.5491	1:22.5900	4
5	3	(New Zealand) Jason Richards	Tasman Motorsport	Holden Commodore (VE)	1:22.5266	1:22.4591	1:22.6406	5
6	888	(Australia) Craig Lowndes	Triple Eight Race Engineering	Ford Falcon (BF)	1:23.3665	1:22.8518	1:22.6513	6
7	22	(Australia) Todd Kelly	Holden Racing Team	Holden Commodore (VE)	1:22.9857	1:22.6397	1:22.6850	7
8	9	(Australia) Russell Ingall	Stone Brothers Racing	Ford Falcon (BF)	1:23.0247	1:22.8264	1:22.6960	8
9	17	(Australia) Steven Johnson	Dick Johnson Racing	Ford Falcon (BF)	1:22.9065	1:23.3445	1:22.7326	9
10	33	(Australia) Lee Holdsworth	Garry Rogers Motorsport	Holden Commodore (VE)	1:23.2083	1:22.6911	1:23.3118	10
11	51	(New Zealand) Greg Murphy	Tasman Motorsport	Holden Commodore (VE)	1:22.9274	1:22.7708	—N/a	11
12	25	(Australia) Jason Bright	Britek Motorsport	Ford Falcon (BF)	1:22.9992	1:22.7424	—N/a	12
13	18	(Australia) Will Davison	Dick Johnson Racing	Ford Falcon (BF)	1:23.0449	1:23.1890	—N/a	13
14	34	(Australia) Dean Canto	Garry Rogers Motorsport	Holden Commodore (VE)	1:23.0614	1:23.4298	—N/a	14
15	1	(Australia) Rick Kelly	HSV Dealer Team	Holden Commodore (VE)	1:23.0704	1:23.0421	—N/a	15
16	6	(New Zealand) Steven Richards	Ford Performance Racing	Ford Falcon (BF)	1:23.0722	1:23.3582	—N/a	16
17	2	(Australia) Mark Skaife	Holden Racing Team	Holden Commodore (VE)	1:23.1464	1:23.0140	—N/a	17
18	12	(Australia) Andrew Jones	Brad Jones Racing	Ford Falcon (BF)	1:23.2983	1:23.5814	—N/a	18
19	10	(Australia) Jason Bargwanna	WPS Racing	Ford Falcon (BF)	1:23.5071	1:23.3942	—N/a	19
20	20	(Australia) Paul Dumbrell	Paul Weel Racing	Holden Commodore (VE)	1:24.5840	1:23.0002	—N/a	20
21	111	(Australia) John Bowe	Paul Cruickshank Racing	Ford Falcon (BF)	1:23.6123	—N/a	—N/a	21
22	67	(Australia) Paul Morris	Paul Morris Motorsport	Holden Commodore (VE)	1:23.6507	—N/a	—N/a	22
23	8	(Brazil) Max Wilson	WPS Racing	Ford Falcon (BF)	1:23.6656	—N/a	—N/a	23
24	50	(Australia) Cameron McConville	Paul Weel Racing	Holden Commodore (VE)	1:23.7515	—N/a	—N/a	24
25	39	(New Zealand) Fabian Coulthard	Paul Morris Motorsport	Holden Commodore (VE)	1:23.8029	—N/a	—N/a	25
26	11	(Australia) Jack Perkins	Perkins Engineering	Holden Commodore (VE)	1:23.8635	—N/a	—N/a	26
27	26	(Australia) Alan Gurr	Britek Motorsport	Ford Falcon (BF)	1:23.8805	—N/a	—N/a	27
28	14	(Australia) Brad Jones	Brad Jones Racing	Ford Falcon (BF)	1:23.9948	—N/a	—N/a	28
29	55	(Australia) Steve Owen	Rod Nash Racing	Holden Commodore (VE)	1:24.0337	—N/a	—N/a	29
30	021	(Australia) Adam Macrow	Team Kiwi Racing	Ford Falcon (BF)	1:24.1811	—N/a	—N/a	30
31	7	(Australia) Shane Price	Perkins Engineering	Holden Commodore (VE)	1:24.2683	—N/a	—N/a	31

=== Race 1 results ===
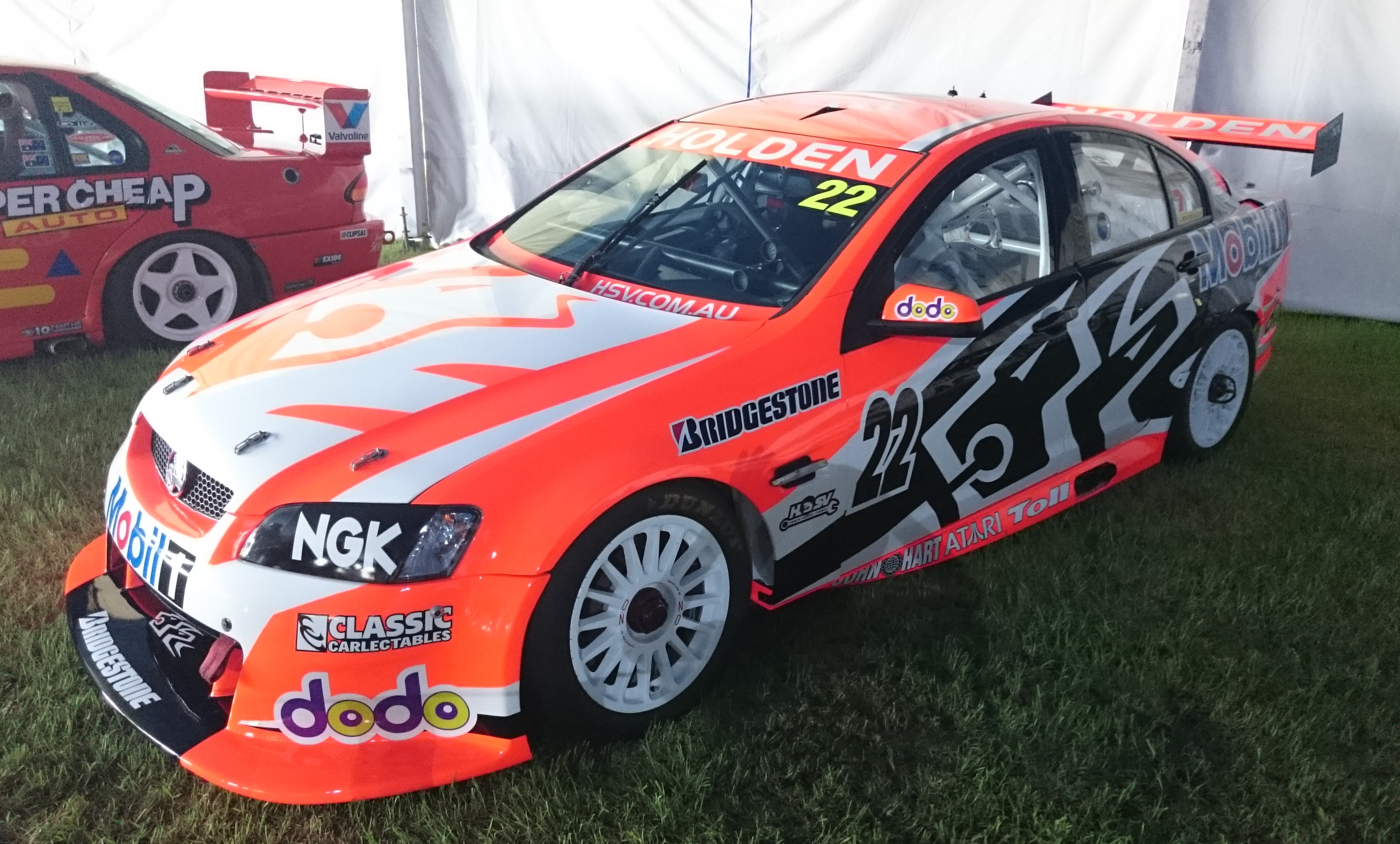
Todd Kelly won Race 1 driving this Holden Commodore VE for the Holden Racing Team. The car is pictured in 2018 in its 2007 livery.

Pos	No	Name	Team	Vehicle	Laps	Time/Retired	Grid	Points
1	22	(Australia) Todd Kelly	Holden Racing Team	Holden Commodore (VE)	78	1hr 50min 40.5932sec	7	36
2	4	(Australia) James Courtney	Stone Brothers Racing	Ford Falcon (BF)	78	+ 2.087	1	30
3	88	(Australia) Jamie Whincup	Triple Eight Race Engineering	Ford Falcon (BF)	78	+ 5.142	2	25
4	1	(Australia) Rick Kelly	HSV Dealer Team	Holden Commodore (VE)	78	+ 6.289	15	22
5	5	(Australia) Mark Winterbottom	Ford Performance Racing	Ford Falcon (BF)	78	+ 10.710	4	20
6	16	(Australia) Garth Tander	HSV Dealer Team	Holden Commodore (VE)	78	+ 21.390	3	18
7	51	(New Zealand) Greg Murphy	Tasman Motorsport	Holden Commodore (VE)	78	+ 23.006	11	16
8	9	(Australia) Russell Ingall	Stone Brothers Racing	Ford Falcon (BF)	78	+ 24.435	8	15
9	17	(Australia) Steven Johnson	Dick Johnson Racing	Ford Falcon (BF)	78	+ 32.553	9	13
10	25	(Australia) Jason Bright	Britek Motorsport	Ford Falcon (BF)	78	+ 45.474	12	12
11	6	(New Zealand) Steven Richards	Ford Performance Racing	Ford Falcon (BF)	78	+ 45.911	16	9
12	34	(Australia) Dean Canto	Garry Rogers Motorsport	Holden Commodore (VE)	78	+ 48.906	14	8
13	888	(Australia) Craig Lowndes	Triple Eight Race Engineering	Ford Falcon (BF)	78	+ 54.592	6	6
14	2	(Australia) Mark Skaife	Holden Racing Team	Holden Commodore (VE)	78	+ 1:11.976	14	5
15	10	(Australia) Jason Bargwanna	WPS Racing	Ford Falcon (BF)	78	+ 1:23.452	19	3
16	55	(Australia) Steve Owen	Rod Nash Racing	Holden Commodore (VZ)	78	+ 1:24.602	29	
17	8	(Brazil) Max Wilson	WPS Racing	Ford Falcon (BF)	77	+ 1 lap	23	
18	021	(Australia) Adam Macrow	Team Kiwi Racing	Ford Falcon (BF)	77	+ 1 lap	30	
19	11	(Australia) Jack Perkins	Perkins Engineering	Holden Commodore (VE)	76	+ 2 laps	26	
20	3	(New Zealand) Jason Richards	Tasman Motorsport	Holden Commodore (VE)	76	+ 2 laps	5	
21	50	(Australia) Cameron McConville	Paul Weel Racing	Holden Commodore (VZ)	76	+ 2 laps	24	
22	7	(Australia) Shane Price	Perkins Engineering	Holden Commodore (VE)	76	+ 2 laps	31	
23	26	(Australia) Alan Gurr	Britek Motorsport	Ford Falcon (BF)	75	+ 3 laps	27	
24	33	(Australia) Lee Holdsworth	Garry Rogers Motorsport	Holden Commodore (VZ)	74	+ 4 laps	10	
25	12	(Australia) Andrew Jones	Brad Jones Racing	Ford Falcon (BF)	73	+ 5 laps	18	
Ret	14	(Australia) Brad Jones	Brad Jones Racing	Ford Falcon (BF)	48	Retired	28	
Ret	20	(Australia) Paul Dumbrell	Paul Weel Racing	Holden Commodore (VE)	47	Leg injury	20	
Ret	18	(Australia) Will Davison	Dick Johnson Racing	Ford Falcon (BF)	38	Back injury	13	
Ret	67	(Australia) Paul Morris	Paul Morris Motorsport	Holden Commodore (VZ)	31	Differential	22	
Ret	111	(Australia) John Bowe	Paul Cruickshank Racing	Ford Falcon (BF)	16	Accident	21	
Ret	39	(New Zealand) Fabian Coulthard	Paul Morris Motorsport	Holden Commodore (VZ)	6	Engine	25	
Fastest Lap: James Courtney (Stone Brothers Racing) - 1:22.8075 on lap 32

=== Race 2 results ===
Pos	No	Name	Team	Car	Laps	Time/retired	Grid	Points
1	1	(Australia) Rick Kelly	HSV Dealer Team	Holden Commodore (VE)	78	1:58:54.1927	4	36
2	22	(Australia) Todd Kelly	Holden Racing Team	Holden Commodore (VE)	78	+ 1.700	1	30
3	4	(Australia) James Courtney	Stone Brothers Racing	Ford Falcon (BF)	78	+ 2.468	2	25
4	9	(Australia) Russell Ingall	Stone Brothers Racing	Ford Falcon (BF)	78	+ 3.047	8	22
5	88	(Australia) Jamie Whincup	Triple Eight Race Engineering	Ford Falcon (BF)	78	+ 4.470	3	20
6	17	(Australia) Steven Johnson	Dick Johnson Racing	Ford Falcon (BF)	78	+ 4.940	9	18
7	2	(Australia) Mark Skaife	Holden Racing Team	Holden Commodore (VE)	78	+ 7.073	14	16
8	6	(New Zealand) Steven Richards	Ford Performance Racing	Ford Falcon (BF)	78	+ 10.972	11	15
9	18	(Australia) Will Davison	Dick Johnson Racing	Ford Falcon (BF)	78	+ 11.341	28	13
10	16	(Australia) Garth Tander	HSV Dealer Team	Holden Commodore (VE)	78	+ 13.783	6	12
11	888	(Australia) Craig Lowndes	Triple Eight Race Engineering	Ford Falcon (BF)	78	+ 16.571	13	9
12	33	(Australia) Lee Holdsworth	Garry Rogers Motorsport	Holden Commodore (VZ)	78	+ 17.330	24	8
13	3	(New Zealand) Jason Richards	Tasman Motorsport	Holden Commodore (VE)	78	+ 18.450	20	6
14	25	(Australia) Jason Bright	Britek Motorsport	Ford Falcon (BF)	78	+ 18.860	10	5
15	50	(Australia) Cameron McConville	Paul Weel Racing	Holden Commodore (VZ)	78	+ 19.578	21	3
16	021	(Australia) Adam Macrow	Team Kiwi Racing	Ford Falcon (BF)	78	+ 20.065	18	
17	67	(Australia) Paul Morris	Paul Morris Motorsport	Holden Commodore (VE)	78	+ 20.570	29	
18	34	(Australia) Dean Canto	Garry Rogers Motorsport	Holden Commodore (VE)	78	+ 27.950	12	
19	39	(New Zealand) Fabian Coulthard	Paul Morris Motorsport	Holden Commodore (VZ)	77	+ 1 lap	31	
20	20	(Australia) Paul Dumbrell	Paul Weel Racing	Holden Commodore (VE)	77	+ 1 lap	27	
21	14	(Australia) Brad Jones	Brad Jones Racing	Ford Falcon (BF)	76	+ 2 laps	26	
22	7	(Australia) Shane Price	Perkins Engineering	Holden Commodore (VE)	75	+ 3 laps	22	
Ret	8	(Brazil) Max Wilson	WPS Racing	Ford Falcon (BF)	67	Steering	17	
Ret	51	(New Zealand) Greg Murphy	Tasman Motorsport	Holden Commodore (VE)	59	Engine	7	
Ret	12	(Australia) Andrew Jones	Brad Jones Racing	Ford Falcon (BF)	57	Back Injury	25	
Ret	111	(Australia) John Bowe	Paul Cruickshank Racing	Ford Falcon (BF)	44	Suspension	30	
Ret	10	(Australia) Jason Bargwanna	WPS Racing	Ford Falcon (BF)	44	Fuel Pickup	15	
Ret	5	(Australia) Mark Winterbottom	Ford Performance Racing	Ford Falcon (BF)	42	Engine	5	
Ret	11	(Australia) Jack Perkins	Perkins Engineering	Holden Commodore (VZ)	8	Engine / Crash	19	
Ret	26	(Australia) Alan Gurr	Britek Motorsport	Ford Falcon (BF)		Accident	23	
Ret	55	(Australia) Steve Owen	Rod Nash Racing	Holden Commodore (VZ)		Accident	16	
Fastest Lap: James Courtney (Stone Brothers Racing) - 1:22.4348 on lap 32

== In-Car Camera Coverage ==
The six cars with in-car cameras at the first round were Mark Skaife, Craig Lowndes, James Courtney, Max Wilson, Cameron McConville and Rick Kelly. On Sunday Jason Bright also carried cameras.

== Standings ==
After Round 1 of 13

Pos	No	Name	Team	Points
1	22	Todd Kelly	Holden Racing Team	66
2	1	Rick Kelly	Toll HSV Dealer Team	58
3	4	James Courtney	Stone Brothers Racing	55
4	88	Jamie Whincup	Team Vodafone	45
5	9	Russell Ingall	Stone Brothers Racing	37
