= James Courtney =

Australian racing driver

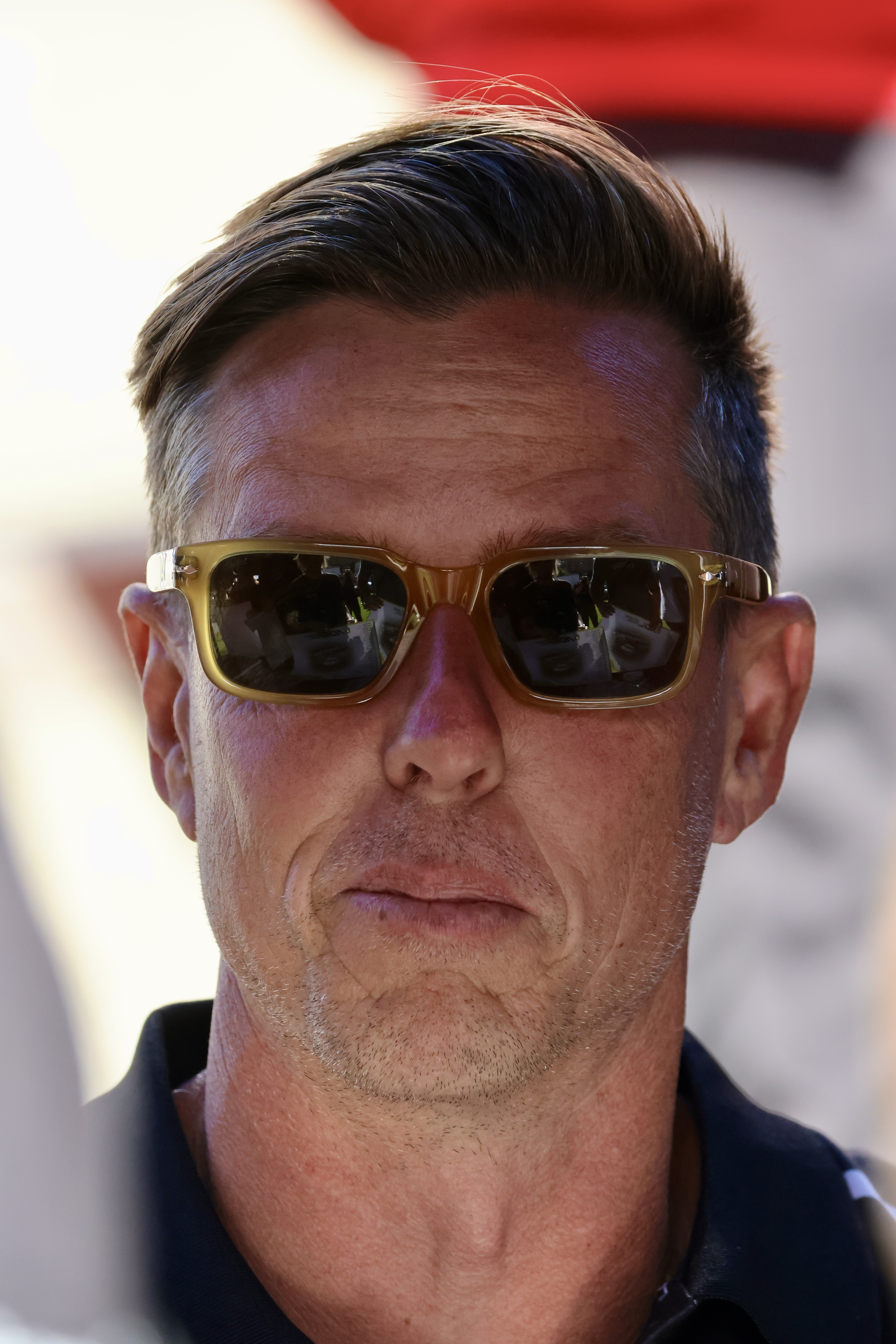
- Courtney in 2025
- Nationality: Australian
- Born: James Anthony Courtney; 29 June 1980 (age 46) Sydney, New South Wales

Supercars Championship career
- Current team: Team 18 (Endurance race co-driver)
- Championships: 1 (2010)
- Races: 603
- Wins: 15
- Podiums: 76
- Pole positions: 10
- 2024 position: 21st (1298 pts)

James Anthony Courtney (born 29 June 1980) is an Australian semi-retired racing driver competing in the Repco Supercars Championship. He currently competes in the Ryco Enduro Cup, currently co-driving with David Reynolds the No. 20 Chevrolet Camaro ZL1 for Team 18. Courtney won the 2010 V8 Supercar Championship Series driving for the Dick Johnson Racing team.

== Early career ==
Courtney has raced and was successful in several other categories, most of which are regarded as the stepping stones to Formula One. He was World Junior Karting Champion in 1995 and world Formula A Champion in 1997. He was British Formula Ford champion in 2000 and broke the record for winning the most Formula Ford races in one season. He drove for the Jaguar Junior Formula Three team in 2001, impressively winning his first F3 race on his F3 debut. He was also a test driver for Jaguar's Formula One team. Injuries from a high-speed test crash at Monza in 2002, due to failure of the rear wing on the Jaguar F1 car, led to him missing some races in that year's British Formula 3 Championship so he could not win the title—although he was easily leading it at that stage. In 2003, he was All-Japan Formula Three champion for the TOM'S team. In 2004 and 2005, he raced in the All Japan Grand Touring Car Championship for Toyota.

Courtney is managed by BTCC/TOCA boss Alan J. Gow, who was instrumental in his European open-wheeler career leading to his testing role with Jaguar Racing. He appeared in the 2007 season of Dancing with the Stars, on the Seven Network.

== Jaguar F1 testing crash ==
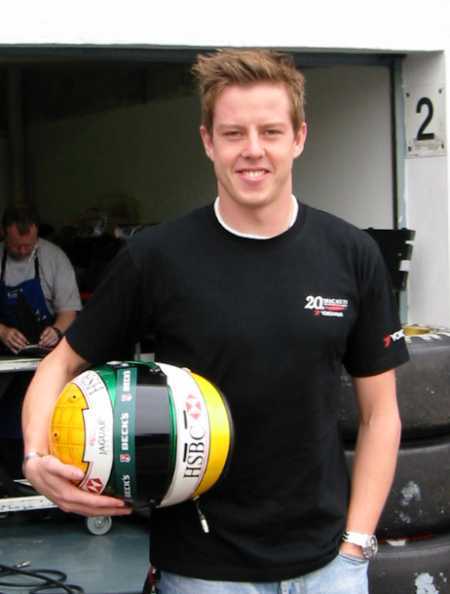
Courtney in 2002

While testing for the Jaguar Racing Formula One team in Monza in 2002, the rear suspension failed on Courtney's car, sending him into the barrier at 306 km/h. The car hit with such force that it bounced back from the wall at 70 km/h, causing Courtney to suffer an impact estimated at 67G. When he regained consciousness, he found the man who had pulled him from the wreck, multiple World Champion Michael Schumacher who had been at the circuit testing for Ferrari, shouting at him, trying to translate for the Italian track marshals who could not speak English. Courtney "freaked out" when he found that he could not move the right side of his body and was bleeding from his eyes. He explained that "it took me a year to recover. I couldn't walk without getting a migraine. Anything would set it off. Noise, light, anything." Courtney also revealed that he could not see for weeks after the accident, and that he decided at that point never to be scared of having a crash again, stating "It's over if you are scared. It is all or nothing".

== Supercars Championship ==
Courtney debuted in V8 Supercars in 2005 with the Holden Racing Team in the endurance races with co-driving with Jim Richards but enjoyed limited success.

=== Stone Brothers Racing ===
In 2006, Courtney joined Ford team Stone Brothers Racing to replace two-time champion Marcos Ambrose. He crashed the car on debut in Adelaide but recovered to finished third in the 2006 Bathurst 1000 and followed it up with a second place in the 2007 Bathurst 1000. On 19 July 2008, Courtney collected his first V8 Supercar race win, taking out race one of the City of Ipswich 400 at Queensland Raceway. He finished the year sixth in the championship.

=== Dick Johnson Racing ===
In 2009, Courtney switched to Dick Johnson Racing. He was given a brand new Triple Eight Race Engineering built Ford FG Falcon and was regarded by many as a serious threat for the title. This came undone at the start of the year, with an accident marred start to the season. Courtney took wins at the new events at Townsville and Sydney and finished the year in seventh.

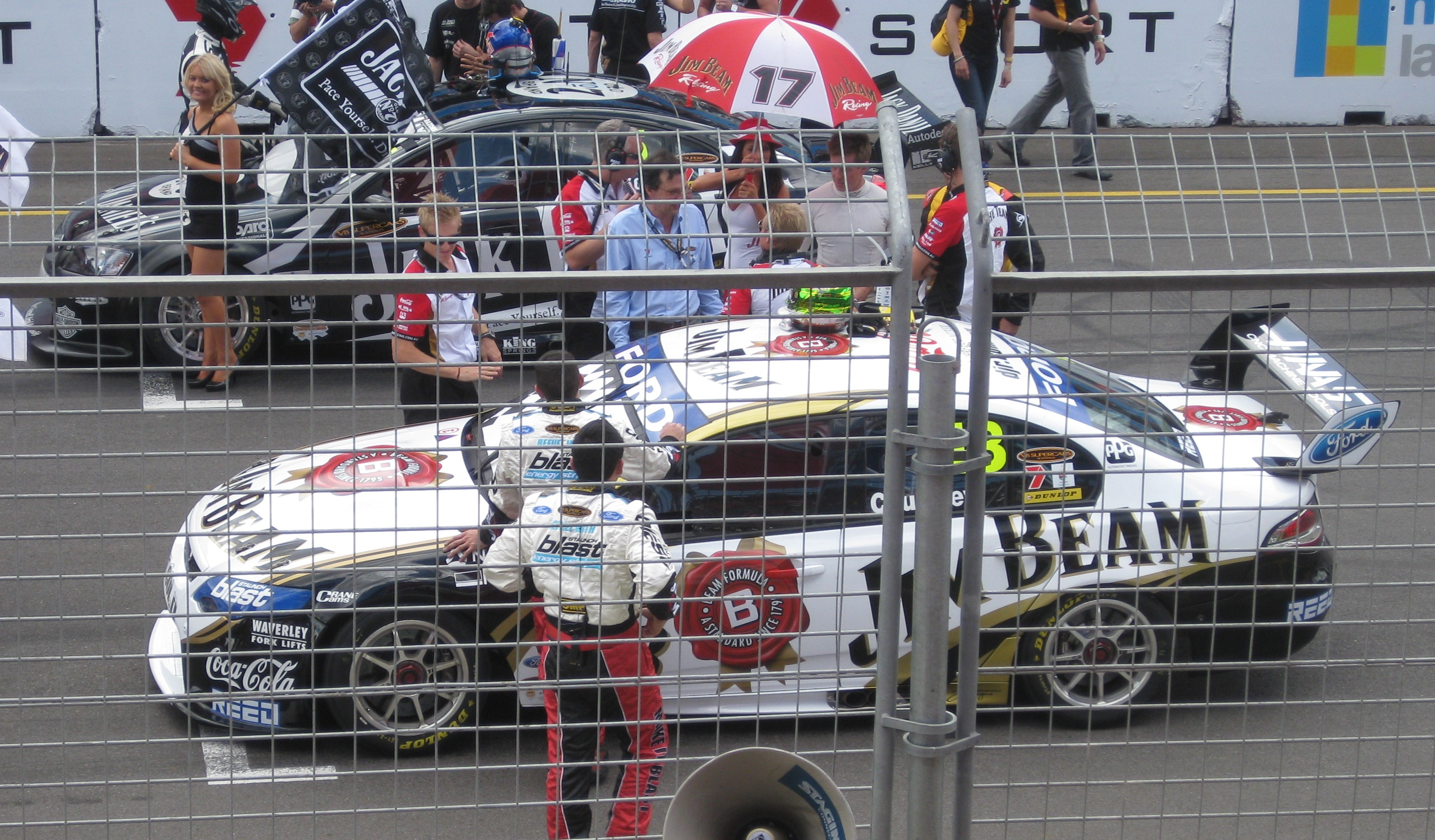
The Ford FG Falcon of James Courtney at the 2010 Clipsal 500 Adelaide

In 2010, Courtney his best season to date, with podiums at Adelaide, Melbourne GP and Hamilton, and five race wins; two each at Queensland Raceway and Winton, and one at Sandown. He won the 2010 V8 Supercar Championship Series, ahead of 2009 V8 Supercar champion Jamie Whincup. It marked the first time in 15 years that a Dick Johnson Racing entry had won the championship. In the immediate post-season, however, Courtney signed a deal to leave the team and join the Holden Racing Team.

=== Walkinshaw Andretti United ===
Since joining Walkinshaw Andretti United, Courtney has had limited success, taking just one race win at the 2011 Yas V8 400. After his win at Abu Dhabi, he struggled during the season with little success at most rounds with a best finish of 4th at Adelaide. He then achieved a second at Sandown. He finished tenth in the 2011 championship with 1869 points, while his teammate Garth Tander finished fifth with 2574 points and 2011 Champion Jamie Whincup amassed 3168 points.

After the first race of the 2012 race, the Clipsal 500 on the Adelaide street circuit, he was in 28th place in the championship.

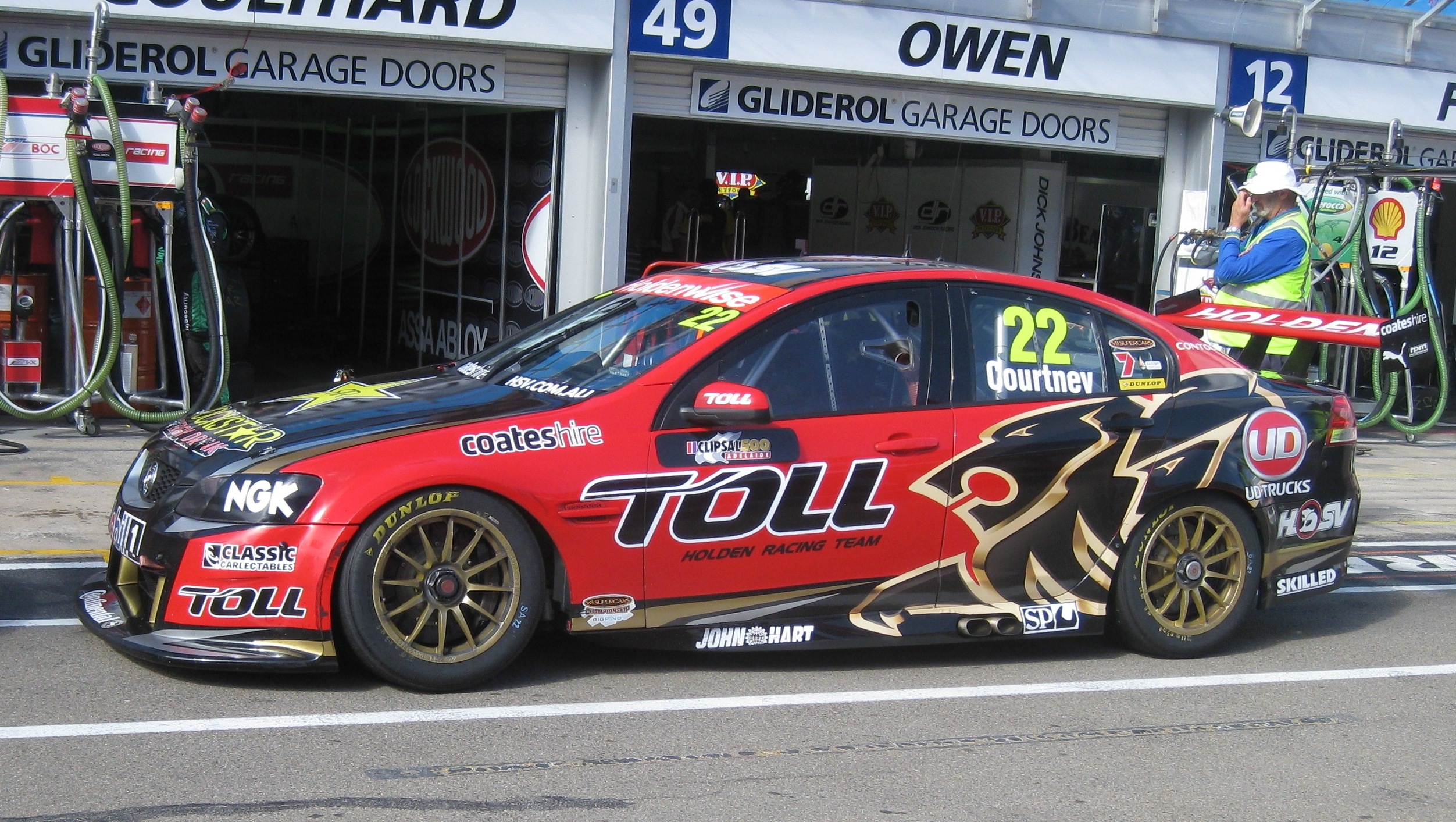
The Holden VE Commodore of James Courtney at the 2012 Clipsal 500 Adelaide

Courtney retained his seat at the Holden Racing Team for 2012 alongside Garth Tander. Courtney's season started with a crash at the Clipsal 500 Adelaide in race 1 and a 25th in race 2. He then finished 18th in the first race of Symmons Plains but recorded an impressive eighth in race 2. He now sits 21st in the championship with 171 points while Tander is in sixth with 368 points.

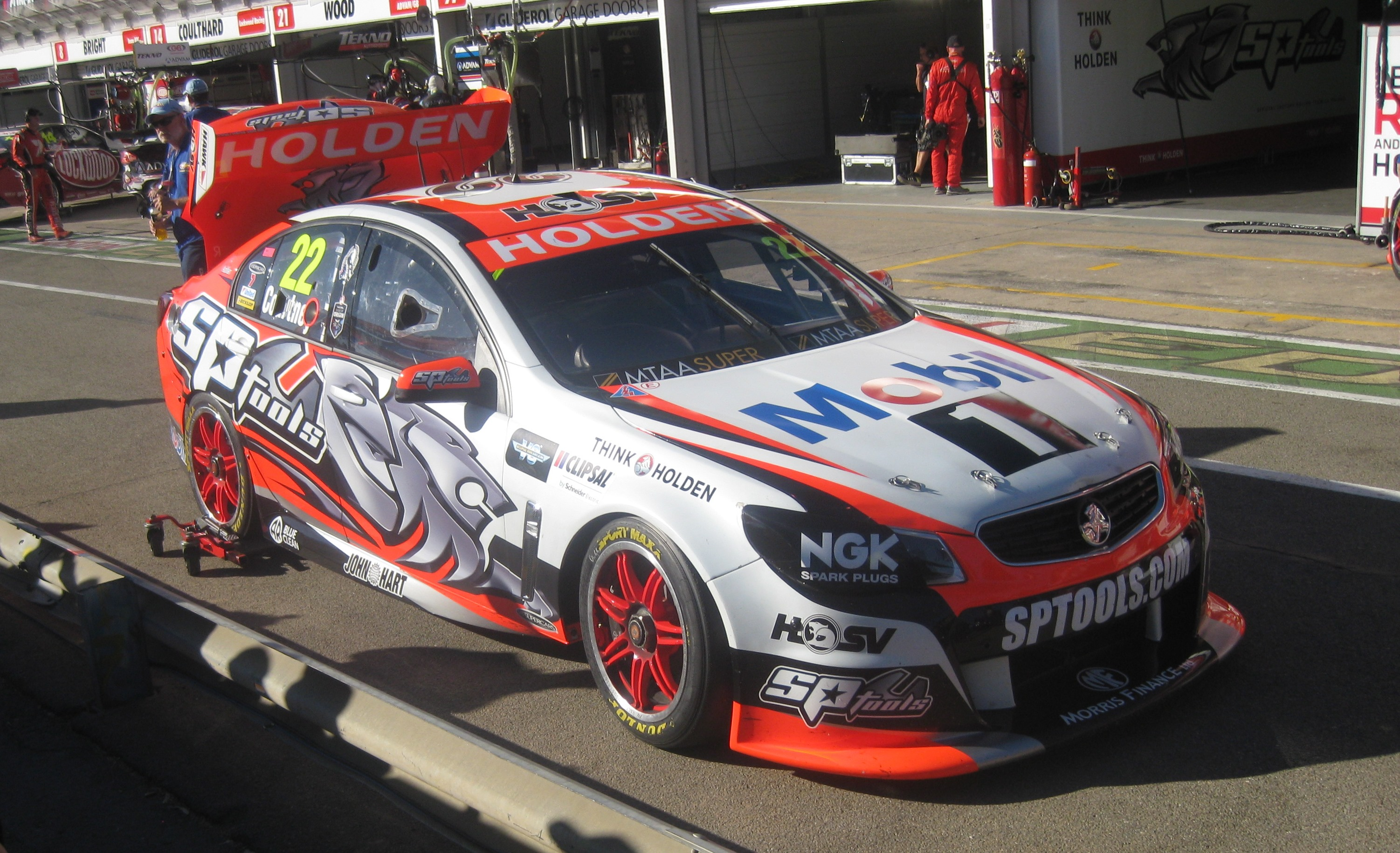
Courtney placed sixth in the 2014 V8 Supercars Championship driving a Holden VF Commodore

Courtney sat out the final four races of the 2013 Championship Series after a severe incident during Race 32 at the Phillip Island Grand Prix Circuit. As Courtney entered the turn 4 hairpin (Honda Corner) an out of control Alexandre Prémat, after suffering a delaminated tyre, made heavy contact to the driver's side window of James Courtney's car with the rear of his own after hitting a slight mound in the grass. The incident caused significant damage to both cars including snapping the safety bars of Courtney's car. Both cars inevitably could not compete in the next two races held on the weekend. Courtney suffered a tear in his right quad muscle and a fractured tibia. HRT endurance co-driver Nick Percat replaced him for the final two races of the season at the Sydney 500.

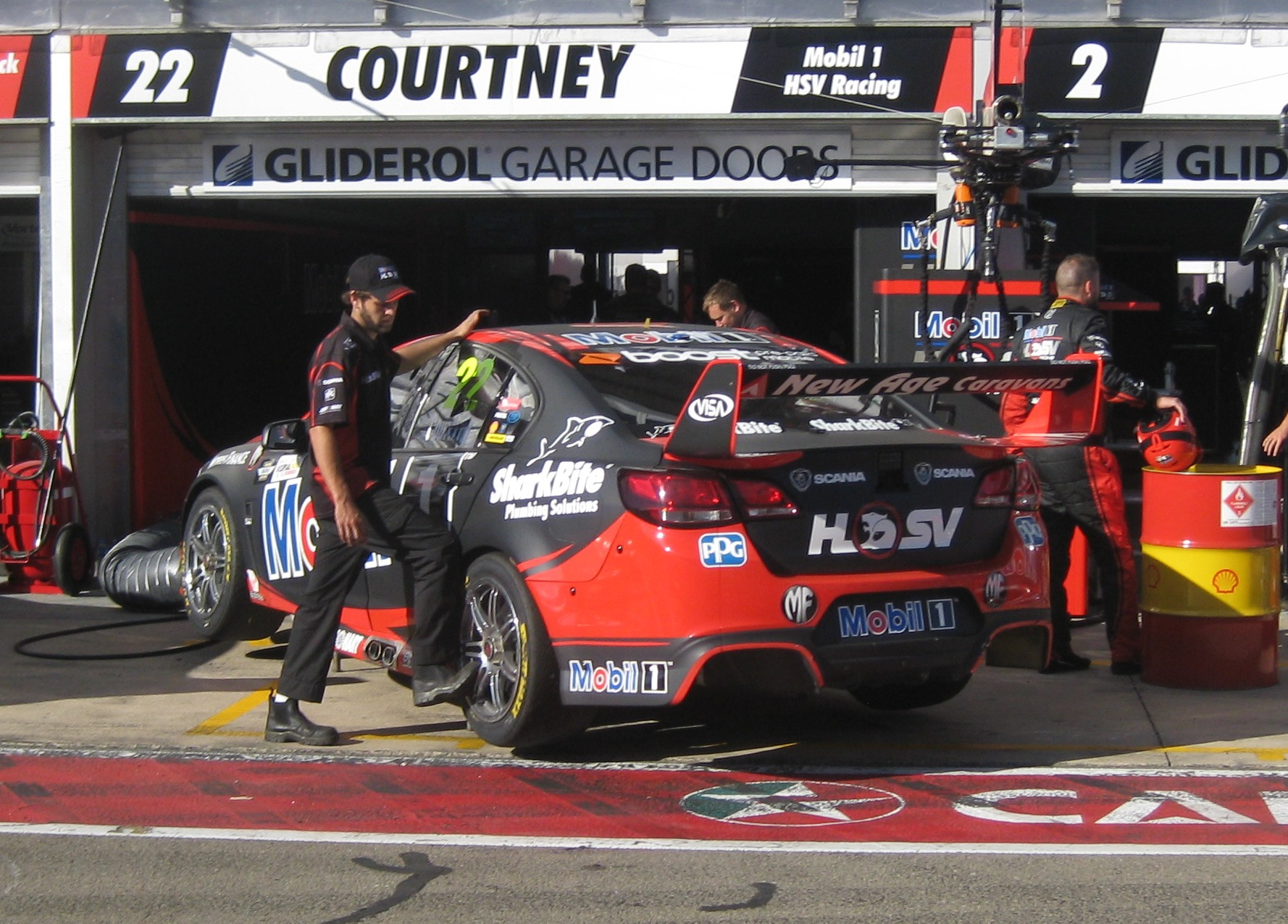
Courtney's Holden VF Commodore at the 2017 Clipsal 500 Adelaide

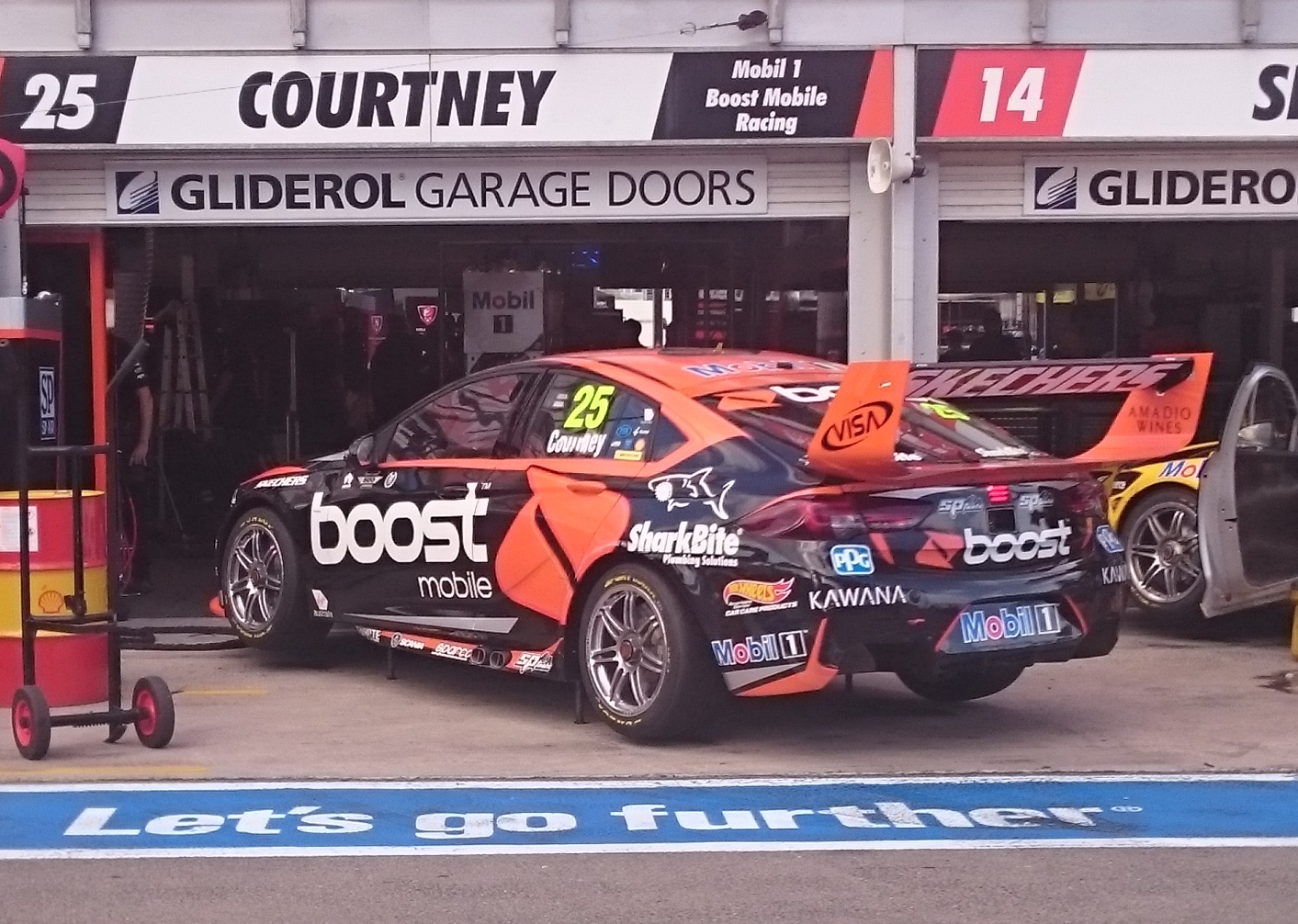
Courtney's Holden Commodore ZB at the 2018 Adelaide 500

Courtney withdrew from the 2015 Sydney Motorsport Park Super Sprint after sustaining chest injuries whilst standing in pit lane when he was hit by an airborne piece of metal signage blown through the air by a low flying Navy helicopter. He was admitted to hospital with two broken ribs and a punctured lung. Endurance co-driver Jack Perkins substituted for Courtney while he recovered in hospital. On 26 August 2015, Courtney confirmed that he would not participate in the Sandown 500 to recover from his injuries. There was a last-minute decision at the Bathurst 1000, where he decided not to race. He returned at the Gold Coast 600, winning the 300 km race on Sunday with Perkins.

== Personal life ==
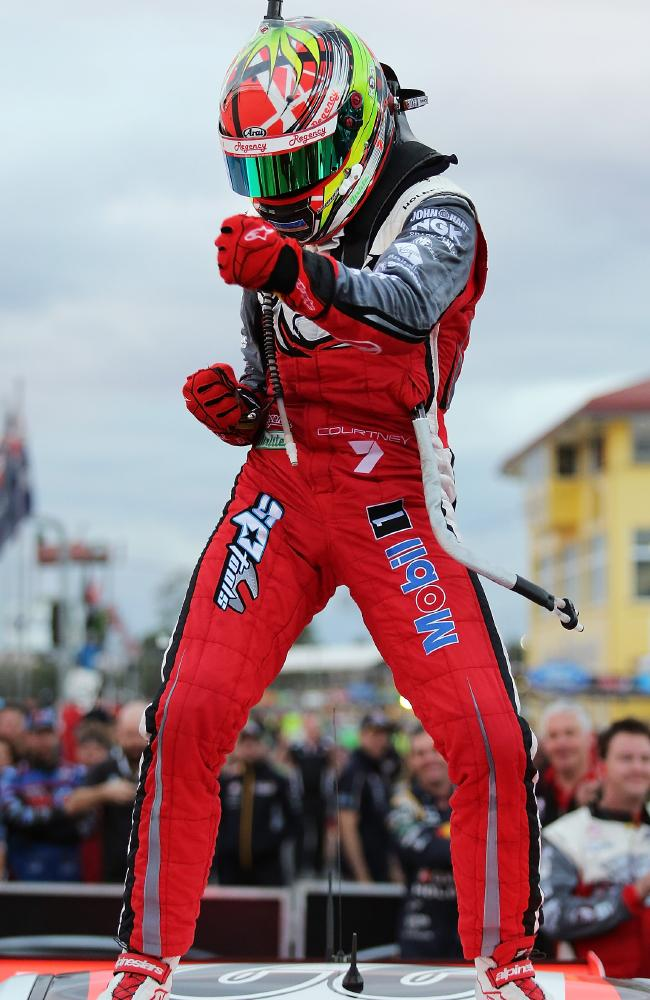
Courtney's victory celebration

Courtney is divorced and has a daughter named Zara, a younger son named Cadel, and a daughter named Opal. Courtney was born with a twin sister, and resides near the Gold Coast, Queensland. He has done so since driving for Stone Brothers Racing in 2006. He is an enthusiast of quality watches and drives a HSV GTS.

In a short interview with "Australian Muscle Car" magazine for the November/December 2013 issue, Courtney revealed his first car was a Datsun 1200 ute powered by a turbocharged 2.0 litre engine. He described the car as "crazy" and that it would "spin the rear wheels in fifth gear, no problem".

== Career results ==
=== Karting career summary ===
Season	Series	Position
1994	Australian National Kart Championship	**2nd**
1995	World Junior Karting Championship	**1st**
1995	CIK International Championship	**1st**
1996	World Formula A Karting Championship	4th
1997	World Formula A Karting Championship	**1st**

=== Circuit career ===
Season	Series	Position	Car	Team
1999	British Formula Ford Championship	5th	Van Diemen RF99 Ford	Duckhams Van Diemen
1999	Formula Ford Festival	**2nd**	Van Diemen RF99 Ford	Duckhams Van Diemen
2000	British Formula Ford Championship	**1st**	Van Diemen RF00 Ford	Van Diemen
2001	British Formula 3 Championship	4th	Dallara 301 Mugen-Honda	Jaguar Junior Team
2002	British Formula 3 Championship	**2nd**	Dallara 302 Mugen-Honda	Carlin Motorsport
2003	All-Japan Formula Three Championship	**1st**	Dallara 302 TOM'S-Toyota	TOM'S
2003	Formula Nippon Championship	13th	Lola B3/51 Mugen-Honda	Team 5Zigen
2004	Japan Grand Touring Car Championship	6th	Toyota Supra	TOM'S
2005	Super GT Series	4th	Toyota Supra	TOM'S
2005	V8 Supercar Championship Series	47th	Holden VZ Commodore	Holden Racing Team
2006	V8 Supercar Championship Series	11th	Ford BA Falcon	Stone Brothers Racing
2007	V8 Supercar Championship Series	9th	Ford BF Falcon	Stone Brothers Racing
2008	V8 Supercar Championship Series	6th	Ford BF Falcon	Stone Brothers Racing
2009	V8 Supercar Championship Series	7th	Ford FG Falcon	Dick Johnson Racing
2010	V8 Supercar Championship Series	**1st**	Ford FG Falcon	Dick Johnson Racing
2011	International V8 Supercars Championship	10th	Holden VE Commodore	Holden Racing Team
2012	International V8 Supercars Championship	10th	Holden VE Commodore	Holden Racing Team
2013	International V8 Supercars Championship	11th	Holden VF Commodore	Holden Racing Team
2014	International V8 Supercars Championship	6th	Holden VF Commodore	Holden Racing Team
2015	International V8 Supercars Championship	10th	Holden VF Commodore	Holden Racing Team
2016	International V8 Supercars Championship	11th	Holden VF Commodore	Holden Racing Team
2017	Virgin Australia Supercars Championship	21st	Holden VF Commodore	Walkinshaw Racing
2018	Virgin Australia Supercars Championship	14th	Holden ZB Commodore	Walkinshaw Andretti United
2019	Virgin Australia Supercars Championship	11th	Holden ZB Commodore	Walkinshaw Andretti United
2020	Virgin Australia Supercars Championship	13th	Holden ZB Commodore; Ford Mustang GT	Team Sydney by Tekno; Tickford Racing
2021	Repco Supercars Championship	11th	Ford Mustang GT	Tickford Racing
2022	Repco Supercars Championship	12th	Ford Mustang GT	Tickford Racing
2023	Repco Supercars Championship	17th	Ford Mustang GT S650	Tickford Racing
2024	Repco Supercars Championship	21st	Ford Mustang GT S650	Blanchard Racing Team
2025	Repco Supercars Championship	19th	Ford Mustang GT S650	Blanchard Racing Team

=== Complete British Formula Three Championship results ===
(key) (Races in bold indicate pole position) (Races in italics indicate fastest lap)

Year	Entrant	Chassis	Engine	1	2	3	4	5	6	7	8	9	10	11	12	13	14	15	16	17	18	19	20	21	22	23	24	25	26	27	DC	Pts
2001	Jaguar Junior Team	Dallara F301	Mugen-Honda	SIL; 1; 1	SIL; 2; 8	DON; 1; 6	DON; 2; 6	SNE; 1; 7	SNE; 2; 2	OUL; 1; 7	OUL; 2 Ret	CRO; 1; 3	CRO; 2; 9	ROC; 1; 6	ROC; 2; 4	CAS; 1; 3	CAS; 2; 3	BRH; 1; 2	**BRH**; **2**; 2	DON; 1 Ret	DON; 2; 8	KNO; 1; 3	KNO; 2 C	THR; 1; 4	THR; 1; 5	THR; 2; 2	BRH; 1; 10	**BRH**; **2**; 2	SIL; 1; 4	SIL; 2; 4	4th	227
2002	Carlin Motorsport	Dallara F302	Mugen-Honda	**BRH**; **1**; 2	**BRH**; **2**; 2	**DON**; **1**; 3	**DON**; **2**; 2	SIL; 1 Ret	**SIL**; **2**; 5	**KNO**; **1**; 1	**KNO**; **2**; 1	**CRO**; **1**; 1	CRO; 2 C	**SIL**; **1** Ret	SIL; 2; 1	**CAS**; **1**; 2	**CAS**; **2**; 20	BRH; 1; 7	BRH; 2; 2	ROC; 1	ROC; 2	OUL; 1; 4	OUL; 2; 1	SNE; 1; 5	SNE; 2; 6	**SNE**; **3**; 9	THR; 1 Ret	THR; 2; 4	DON; 1; 4	DON; 2; 4	2nd	269

=== Complete Macau Grand Prix results ===
Year	Team	Car	Qualifying	Quali Race	Main race
2002	(United Kingdom) Carlin Motorsport	Dallara F302-Mugen-Honda	13th	DNF	DNS
2003	(Japan) TOM'S	Dallara F302-Toyota	3rd	1st	DNF

=== Complete Japanese Formula Three Championship results ===
(key) (Races in bold indicate pole position) (Races in italics indicate fastest lap)

Year	Team	Chassis	Engine	1	2	3	4	5	6	7	8	9	10	11	12	13	14	15	16	17	18	19	20	DC	Pts
2003	TOM'S	Dallara F302	Toyota	**SUZ**; **1**; 1	**SUZ**; **2**; 8	**FUJ**; **1**; 1	**FUJ**; **2**; 1	**TAI**; **1**; 1	**TAI**; **2**; 1	MOT; 1; 2	MOT; 2; 2	**SUZ**; **1**; 5	SUZ; 2; 2	**SUG**; **1**; 1	**SUG**; **2**; 1	TSU; 1; 5	TSU; 2; 3	**SUG**; **1**; 1	**SUG**; **2**; 1	MIN; 1; 1	**MIN**; **2**; 1	**MOT**; **1**; 1	**MOT**; **2**; 1	1st	305

=== Complete Formula Nippon results ===
(key)

Year	Entrant	1	2	3	4	5	6	7	8	9	10	DC	Points
2003	Team 5Zigen	SUZ	FUJ	MIN	MOT	SUZ	SUG	FUJ; 4	MIN; 7	MOT; Ret	SUZ; Ret	12th	3

=== Complete Super GT results ===
Year	Team	Car	Class	1	2	3	4	5	6	7	8	DC	Pts
2004	Team TOM'S	Toyota Supra	GT500	TAI; 11	SUG; 3	SEP; 5	TOK; 5	MOT; 4	AUT; 6	SUZ; 6		6th	44
2005	Team TOM'S	Toyota Supra	GT500	OKA; 2	FUJ; 10	SEP; 3	SUG; 3	MOT; 7	FUJ; 5	AUT; 8	SUZ; 5	4th	60

=== Supercars Championship results ===
Supercars results
Year	Team	No.	Car	1	2	3	4	5	6	7	8	9	10	11	12	13	14	15	16	17	18	19	20	21	22	23	24	25	26	27	28	29	30	31	32	33	34	35	36	37	38	39	Position	Points
2005	Holden Racing Team	22	Holden VZ Commodore	ADE; R1	ADE; R2	PUK; R3	PUK; R4	PUK; R5	BAR; R6	BAR; R7	BAR; R8	EAS; R9	EAS; R10	SHA; R11	SHA; R12	SHA; R13	HDV; R14	HDV; R15	HDV; R16	QLD; R17	ORA; R18	ORA; R19	SAN; R20; 11	BAT; R21; Ret	SUR; R22	SUR; R23	SUR; R24	SYM; R25	SYM; R26	SYM; R27	PHI; R28	PHI; R29	PHI; R30										47th	152
2006	Stone Brothers Racing	4	Ford BA Falcon	ADE; R1; Ret	ADE; R2; Ret	PUK; R3; 8	PUK; R4; 18	PUK; R5; 8	BAR; R6; 12	BAR; R7; 5	BAR; R8; Ret	WIN; R9; 15	WIN; R10; Ret	WIN; R11; 27	HDV; R12; 16	HDV; R13; 6	HDV; R14; 23	QLD; R15; 3	QLD; R16; 3	QLD; R17; Ret	ORA; R18; 9	ORA; R19; 8	ORA; R20; 3	SAN; R21; 9	BAT; R22; 3	SUR; R23; 17	SUR; R24; 12	SUR; R25; 6	SYM; R26; 5	SYM; R27; 13	SYM; R28; Ret	BHR; R29; 5	BHR; R30; 24	BHR; R31; 7	PHI; R32; 9	PHI; R33; Ret	PHI; R34; 12						11th	2347
2007	Stone Brothers Racing	4	Ford BF Falcon	**ADE**; **R1**; **2**	ADE; R2; 3	BAR; R3; 11	BAR; R4; Ret	BAR; R5; Ret	PUK; R6; 9	PUK; R7; 5	PUK; R8; 3	WIN; R9; 17	WIN; R10; 15	WIN; R11; 8	EAS; R12; Ret	EAS; R13; 14	EAS; R14; 8	HDV; R15; 16	HDV; R16; Ret	HDV; R17; DNS	QLD; R18; 3	QLD; R19; 4	QLD; R20; 18	ORA; R21; 19	ORA; R22; 7	ORA; R23; Ret	SAN; R24; 16	BAT; R25; 2	SUR; R26; 6	SUR; R27; 15	SUR; R28; 4	BHR; R29; 6	BHR; R30; 2	BHR; R31; 2	SYM; R32; 28	SYM; R33; 8	SYM; R34; 6	PHI; R35; 12	PHI; R36; 7	PHI; R37; 6			9th	359
2008	Stone Brothers Racing	4	Ford BF Falcon	ADE; R1; 16	ADE; R2; Ret	EAS; R3; 5	EAS; R4; 15	EAS; R5; Ret	HAM; R6; 4	HAM; R7; 3	HAM; R8; 3	BAR; R9; 20	BAR; R10; 7	BAR; R11; 8	SAN; R12; 6	SAN; R13; 4	SAN; R14; 3	HDV; R15; 10	HDV; R16; 23	HDV; R17; 7	**QLD**; **R18**; **1**	**QLD**; **R19**; **6**	QLD; R20; 2	WIN; R21; 9	WIN; R22; 9	WIN; R23; 25	PHI; Q 3	PHI; R24; 6	BAT; R25; 3	SUR; R26; 9	SUR; R27; 11	SUR; R28; Ret	BHR; R29; 5	BHR; R30; 7	BHR; R31; 2	SYM; R32; Ret	SYM; R33; 17	SYM; R34; 10	ORA; R35; 5	ORA; R36; 6	ORA; R37; 4		6th	2446
2009	Dick Johnson Racing	18	Ford FG Falcon	ADE; R1; 20	ADE; R2; 24	HAM; R3; 13	HAM; R4; 2	WIN; R5; Ret	WIN; R6; 6	SYM; R7; 30	SYM; R8; Ret	HDV; R9; 8	HDV; R10; 12	TOW; R11; Ret	TOW; R12; 1	SAN; R13; 2	SAN; R14; 8	QLD; R15; 2	QLD; R16; 8	PHI; Q 4	PHI; R17; 4	BAT; R18; 24	SUR; R19; Ret	SUR; R20; 16	SUR; R21; 5	SUR; R22; 3	PHI; R23; 9	PHI; R24; 4	BAR; R25; 4	BAR; R26; 10	SYD; R27; 17	SYD; R28; 1											7th	2192
2010	Dick Johnson Racing	18	Ford FG Falcon	YMC; R1; 4	YMC; R2; 6	BHR; R3; 6	BHR; R4; 7	ADE; R5; 2	ADE; R6; 2	HAM; R7; 3	HAM; R8; 21	QLD; R9; 1	QLD; R10; 1	**WIN**; **R11**; **1**	WIN; R12; 1	HDV; R13; 5	HDV; R14; 4	TOW; R15; 5	TOW; R16; 2	PHI; Q 3	PHI; R17; 12	BAT; R18; 5	SUR; R19; 10	SUR; R20; 4	SYM; R21; 11	SYM; R22; 12	SAN; R23; 4	SAN; R24; 1	SYD; R25; 15	SYD; R26; 14													1st	3055
2011	Holden Racing Team	1	Holden VE Commodore	YMC; R1; 26	YMC; R2; 1	ADE; R3; 24	ADE; R4; 4	HAM; R5; 11	HAM; R6; Ret	BAR; R7; 10	BAR; R8; 26	BAR; R9; 5	WIN; R10; 8	WIN; R11; 25	HID; R12; 25	HID; R13; 24	TOW; R14; Ret	TOW; R15; 19	QLD; R16; 20	QLD; R17; Ret	QLD; R18; 12	PHI; Q 12	PHI; R19; 9	BAT; R20; 7	SUR; R21; 14	SUR; R22; 6	SYM; R23; 10	SYM; R24; 11	SAN; R25; 2	SAN; R26; 11	SYD; R27; 7	SYD; R28; 7											10th	1869
2012	Holden Racing Team	22	Holden VE Commodore	ADE; R1; Ret	ADE; R2; 25	SYM; R3; 18	SYM; R4; 8	HAM; R5; 7	HAM; R6; 22	BAR; R7; 5	BAR; R8; 13	BAR; R9; 12	PHI; R10; 18	PHI; R11; 13	HID; R12; 12	HID; R13; 11	TOW; R14; 10	TOW; R15; 15	QLD; R16; 15	QLD; R17; 14	SMP; R18; 6	SMP; R19; 10	SAN; Q 8	SAN; R20; 9	BAT; R21; 4	SUR; R22; 7	SUR; R23; 17	YMC; R24; Ret	YMC; R25; 14	YMC; R26; 13	WIN; R27; 24	WIN; R28; 18	SYD; R29; 3	SYD; R30; 3									10th	2153
2013	Holden Racing Team	22	Holden VF Commodore	ADE; R1; 5	ADE; R2; 7	SYM; R3; 9	SYM; R4; 7	SYM; R5; 3	PUK; R6; 9	PUK; R7; Ret	PUK; R8; 22	PUK; R9; 6	BAR; R10; 8	BAR; R11; 6	BAR; R12; 17	COA; R13; 9	COA; R14; 14	COA; R15; 10	COA; R16; 10	HID; R17; 3	**HID**; **R18**; **2**	HID; R19; Ret	TOW; R20; 6	TOW; R21; 2	QLD; R22; 5	QLD; R23; 3	QLD; R24; 23	WIN; R25; 5	WIN; R26; 3	**WIN**; **R27**; **1**	SAN; QR; 7	SAN; R28; 5	BAT; R29; Ret	SUR; R30; Ret	SUR; R31; Ret	PHI; R32; Ret	PHI; R33; DNS	PHI; R34; DNS	SYD; R35	SYD; R36			11th	1909
2014	Holden Racing Team	22	Holden VF Commodore	ADE; R1; 9	ADE; R2; 18	ADE; R3; 1	SYM; R4; 2	SYM; R5; 10	SYM; R6; 3	WIN; R7; Ret	WIN; R8; 9	WIN; R9; 2	PUK; R10; 4	**PUK**; **R11**; **2**	PUK; R12; 12	PUK; R13; 14	BAR; R14; 9	BAR; R15; 8	BAR; R16; 15	HID; R17; 8	HID; R18; 11	HID; R19; 5	TOW; R20; 8	TOW; R21; 2	TOW; R22; 4	QLD; R23; 5	QLD; R24; 10	QLD; R25; 1	SMP; R26; 8	SMP; R27; 8	SMP; R28; Ret	SAN; QR; 6	SAN; R29; 2	BAT; R30; 13	SUR; R31; Ret	SUR; R32; 21	PHI; R33; 13	PHI; R34; 13	PHI; R35; 12	SYD; R36; 11	SYD; R37; 6	SYD; R38; 3	6th	2489
2015	Holden Racing Team	22	Holden VF Commodore	ADE; R1; 10	ADE; R2; 2	**ADE**; **R3**; **1**	SYM; R4; 3	SYM; R5; 3	SYM; R6; 10	BAR; R7; 10	BAR; R8; 6	BAR; R9; 5	WIN; R10; 14	WIN; R11; 23	WIN; R12; 7	**HID**; **R13**; **23**	HID; R14; 6	HID; R15; 7	TOW; R16; 6	TOW; R17; 2	QLD; R18; 6	QLD; R19; 8	QLD; R20; 6	SMP; R21	SMP; R22	SMP; R23	SAN; R24	BAT; R25	SUR; R26; 5	SUR; R27; 1	PUK; R28; 8	PUK; R29; 6	PUK; R30; 15	PHI; R31; 6	PHI; R32; 10	PHI; R33; 13	SYD; R34; 4	SYD; R35; 4	**SYD**; **R36**; **12**				10th	2110
2016	Holden Racing Team	22	Holden VF Commodore	ADE; R1; 2	ADE; R2; 1	ADE; R3; 21	SYM; R4; 13	SYM; R5; 7	PHI; R6; 21	PHI; R7; 7	BAR; R8; 6	BAR; R9; 8	WIN; R10; 19	WIN; R11; 25	HID; R12; 21	HID; R13; 5	TOW; R14; 6	TOW; R15; 2	QLD; R16; 13	QLD; R17; Ret	SMP; R18; 3	SMP; R19; 8	SAN; QR; 6	SAN; R20; 11	BAT; R21; 13	SUR; R22; 20	SUR; R23; 10	PUK; R24; 6	PUK; R25; 13	PUK; R26; 11	PUK; R27; 14	SYD; R28; 5	SYD; R29; 6										11th	2162
2017	Walkinshaw Racing	22	Holden VF Commodore	ADE; R1; 3	ADE; R2; 4	SYM; R3; Ret	SYM; R4; DNS	PHI; R5; 21	PHI; R6; 20	BAR; R7; 17	BAR; R8; 22	WIN; R9; Ret	WIN; R10; 19	HID; R11; 22	HID; R12; 18	TOW; R13; 25	TOW; R14; 9	QLD; R15; 14	QLD; R16; 23	SMP; R17; 14	SMP; R18; 16	SAN; QR; 14	SAN; R19; 10	BAT; R20; 19	SUR; R21; 14	SUR; R22; 6	PUK; R23; 25	PUK; R24; Ret	NEW; R25; 19	NEW; R26; 24													21st	1431
2018	Walkinshaw Andretti United	22	Holden ZB Commodore	ADE; R1; 2	ADE; R2; 6	MEL; R3; 12	MEL; R4; 20	MEL; R5; 5	MEL; R6; Ret	SYM; R7; 3	SYM; R8; 4	PHI; R9; 17	PHI; R10; Ret	BAR; R11; 13	BAR; R12; 4	WIN; R13; 9	WIN; R14; 19	HID; R15; 23	HID; R16; 11	TOW; R17; 17	TOW; R18; 10	QLD; R19; 8	QLD; R20; Ret	SMP; R21; Ret	BEN; R22; 8	BEN; R23; 13	SAN; QR; 26	SAN; R24; 16	BAT; R25; Ret	SUR; R26; 3	SUR; R27; C	PUK; R28; 9	PUK; R29; 16	NEW; R30; 7	NEW; R31; 5								14th	2073
2019	Walkinshaw Andretti United	22	Holden ZB Commodore	ADE; R1; 10	ADE; R2; 12	MEL; R3; 7	MEL; R4; 9	MEL; R5; 7	MEL; R6; 16	SYM; R7; 5	SYM; R8; 13	PHI; R9; 22	PHI; R10; 24	BAR; R11; 25	BAR; R12; 16	WIN; R13; 4	WIN; R14; 13	HID; R15; 9	HID; R16; 14	TOW; R17; 13	TOW; R18; 13	QLD; R19; 11	QLD; R20; 12	BEN; R21; 10	BEN; R22; 15	PUK; R23; 17	PUK; R24; 17	BAT; R25; 3	SUR; R26; 12	SUR; R27; 9	SAN; QR; 10	SAN; R28; 7	NEW; R29; 7	NEW; R30; 11									11th	2275
2020	Team Sydney by Tekno	19	Holden ZB Commodore	ADE; R1; Ret	ADE; R2; 15	MEL; R3; C	MEL; R4; C	MEL; R5; C	MEL; R6; C																																		13th	1476
2020	Tickford Racing	44	Ford Mustang S550							SMP1; R7; 12	SMP1; R8; 9	SMP1; R9; 14	SMP2; R10; 19	SMP2; R11; 4	SMP2; R12; 16	HID1; R13; 2	HID1; R14; 12	HID1; R15; 17	HID2; R16; 4	HID2; R17; 7	HID2; R18; 14	TOW1; R19; 6	TOW1; R20; 7	TOW1; R21; 13	TOW2; R22; 10	TOW2; R23; 13	TOW2; R24; 9	BEN1; R25; 15	BEN1; R26; 14	BEN1; R27; Ret	BEN2; R28; 7	BEN2; R29; 4	BEN2; R30; 10	BAT; R31; 10									13th	1476
2021	Tickford Racing	44	Ford Mustang S550	BAT1; R1; 8	BAT1; R2; Ret	SAN; R3; 9	SAN; R4; 7	SAN; R5; 15	SYM; R6; 11	SYM; R7; 22	SYM; R8; 9	BEN; R9; 12	BEN; R10; 4	BEN; R11; 8	HID; R12; 10	HID; R13; 10	HID; R14; 5	TOW1; R15; 7	TOW1; R16; 11	TOW2; R17; 8	TOW2; R18; 16	TOW2; R19; 7	SMP1; R20; 22	SMP1; R21; 18	SMP1; R22; 12	SMP2; R23; 15	SMP2; R24; 3	SMP2; R25; Ret	SMP3; R26; 21	SMP3; R27; 19	SMP3; R28; 13	SMP4; R29; 20	SMP4; R30; C	BAT2; R31; 7									11th	1647
2022	Tickford Racing	5	Ford Mustang S550	SMP; R1; 10	SMP; R2; 17	SYM; R3; 12	SYM; R4; 8	SYM; R5; 9	MEL; R6; 20	MEL; R7; 9	MEL; R8; 9	MEL; R9; 22	BAR; R10; 7	BAR; R11; 7	BAR; R12; 2	WIN; R13; 13	WIN; R14; 8	WIN; R15; 27	HID; R16; 9	HID; R17; Ret	HID; R18; 19	TOW; R19; 20	TOW; R20; 4	BEN; R21; 14	BEN; R22; 3	BEN; R23; 12	SAN; R24; 6	SAN; R25; 13	SAN; R26; 12	PUK; R27; 18	PUK; R28; 16	PUK; R29; Ret	BAT; R30; Ret	SUR; R31; 8	SUR; R32; 17	ADE; R33; 3	ADE; R34; 17						12th	1748
2023	Tickford Racing	5	Ford Mustang S650	NEW; R1; 8	NEW; R2; DNS	MEL; R3; 9	MEL; R4; 22	MEL; R5; Ret	MEL; R6; DNS	BAR; R7; 5	BAR; R8; 3	BAR; R9; 9	SYM; R10; 24	SYM; R11; 16	SYM; R12; 22	HID; R13; 23	HID; R14; 16	HID; R15; 21	TOW; R16; 9	TOW; R17; 16	SMP; R18; 13	SMP; R19; 13	BEN; R20; 8	BEN; R21; 11	BEN; R22; 8	SAN; R23; 12	BAT; R24; 6	SUR; R25; 10	SUR; R26; Ret	ADE; R27; 7	ADE; R28; 12												17th	1568
2024	Blanchard Racing Team	7	Ford Mustang S650	BAT1; R1; 15	BAT1; R2; 19	MEL; R3; 8	MEL; R4; 22	MEL; R5; 11	MEL; R6; 16	TAU; R7; 17	TAU; R8; 22	BAR; R9; 6	BAR; R10; 14	HID; R11; 23	HID; R12; 23	TOW; R13; 12	TOW; R14; 16	SMP; R15; 21	SMP; R16; 23	SYM; R17; 21	SYM; R18; 19	SAN; R19; 18	BAT; R20; 21	SUR; R21; 15	SUR; R22; 23	ADE; R23; 8	ADE; R24; 13																21st	1298
2025	Blanchard Racing Team	7	Ford Mustang S650	SYD; R1; 17	SYD; R2; 11	SYD; R3; 12	MEL; R4; DNS	MEL; R5; 17	MEL; R6; 14	MEL; R7; C	TAU; R8; 21	TAU; R9; 22	TAU; R10; 20	SYM; R11; 9	SYM; R12; 13	SYM; R13; 15	BAR; R14; 17	BAR; R15; 16	BAR; R16; 3	HID; R17; 5	HID; R18; 12	HID; R19; 20	TOW; R20; 21	TOW; R21; Ret	TOW; R22; 18	QLD; R23; 13	QLD; R24; 15	QLD; R25; 25	BEN; R26; 17	BAT; R27; Ret	SUR; R28; 6	SUR; R29; Ret	SAN; R30; 13	SAN; R31; 7	ADE; R32; 11	ADE; R33; 9	ADE; R34; 14						19th	1175
2026	Team 18	20	Chevrolet Camaro ZL1	SMP; R1	SMP; R2	SMP; R3	MEL; R4	MEL; R5	MEL; R6	MEL; R7	TAU; R8	TAU; R9	TAU; R10	CHR; R11	CHR; R12	CHR; R13	SYM; R14	SYM; R15	SYM; R16	BAR; R17	BAR; R18	BAR; R19	HID; R20	HID; R21	HID; R22	TOW; R23	TOW; R24	TOW; R25	QLD; R26	QLD; R27	QLD; R28	BEN; R29	BAT; R30	SUR; R31	SUR; R32	SAN; R33	SAN; R34	ADE; R35	ADE; R36	ADE; R37				

=== Bathurst 1000 results ===
Year	Team	Car	Co-driver	Position	Laps
2005	Holden Racing Team	Holden Commodore VZ	(New Zealand) Jim Richards	DNF	7
2006	Stone Brothers Racing	Ford Falcon BA	(Australia) Glenn Seton	**3rd**	161
2007	Stone Brothers Racing	Ford Falcon BF	(Australia) David Besnard	**2nd**	161
2008	Stone Brothers Racing	Ford Falcon BF	(Australia) David Besnard	**3rd**	161
2009	Dick Johnson Racing	Ford Falcon FG	(Australia) Steven Johnson	24th	131
2010	Dick Johnson Racing	Ford Falcon FG	(Australia) Warren Luff	5th	161
2011	Holden Racing Team	Holden Commodore VE	(Australia) Cameron McConville	7th	161
2012	Holden Racing Team	Holden Commodore VE	(Australia) Cameron McConville	4th	161
2013	Holden Racing Team	Holden Commodore VF	(New Zealand) Greg Murphy	DNF	85
2014	Holden Racing Team	Holden Commodore VF	(New Zealand) Greg Murphy	13th	160
2016	Holden Racing Team	Holden Commodore VF	(Australia) Jack Perkins	13th	161
2017	Walkinshaw Racing	Holden Commodore VF	(Australia) Jack Perkins	19th	147
2018	Walkinshaw Andretti United	Holden Commodore ZB	(Australia) Jack Perkins	DNF	33
2019	Walkinshaw Andretti United	Holden Commodore ZB	(Australia) Jack Perkins	**3rd**	161
2020	Tickford Racing	Ford Mustang Mk.6	(Australia) Broc Feeney	10th	161
2021	Tickford Racing	Ford Mustang Mk.6	(Australia) Thomas Randle	7th	161
2022	Tickford Racing	Ford Mustang Mk.6	(Australia) Zane Goddard	DNF	4
2023	Tickford Racing	Ford Mustang S650	(Australia) Zak Best	6th	161
2024	Blanchard Racing Team	Ford Mustang S650	(Australia) Jack Perkins	21st	160
2025	Blanchard Racing Team	Ford Mustang S650	(Australia) Jack Perkins	DNF	127
2026	Team 18	Chevrolet Camaro Mk.6	(Australia) David Reynolds		

Sporting positions
Preceded by Giorgio Pantano	World Junior Karting; Champion; 1995	Succeeded by Fernando Alonso
Preceded by Jean-Christophe Ravier	World Formula A Karting; Champion; 1997	Succeeded by Ruben Carrapatoso
Preceded by Nicolas Kiesa	British Formula Ford; Champion; 2000	Succeeded by Robert Dahlgren
Preceded by Takashi Kogure	All-Japan Formula Three; Champion; 2003	Succeeded by Ronnie Quintarelli
Preceded by Jamie Whincup	Winner of the V8 Supercar Championship Series; 2010	Succeeded by Jamie Whincup
Preceded by Shane van Gisbergen	Winner of the Clipsal 500; 2014-2015	Succeeded by Nick Percat
Awards and achievements
Preceded by Grant Denyer	Mike Kable Young Gun Award; 2006	Succeeded by Dale Wood
Preceded by Will Davison	Barry Sheene Medal; 2010	Succeeded by Craig Lowndes
