= 2008 Adelaide 500 =

2008 Supercar Championship event

(South Australia) 2008 Adelaide 500
Event Information
- Round 1 of 14 in the 2008 V8 Supercar Championship Series
- Date: 22–24 February 2008
- Location: Adelaide, South Australia
- Venue: Adelaide Street Circuit
- Weather: Fine

Results
Race 1
Distance	78 laps	250 km
Pole position	Jamie Whincup; Triple Eight Race Engineering	1:21.3301
Winner	Jamie Whincup; Triple Eight Race Engineering	1:51:37.3538
Race 2
Distance	78 laps	250 km
Winner	Jamie Whincup; Triple Eight Race Engineering	2:11:45.5992
Round Results
First	Jamie Whincup; Triple Eight Race Engineering	300 pts
Second	Lee Holdsworth; Garry Rogers Motorsport	258 pts
Third	Cameron McConville; Brad Jones Racing	129 pts

The 2008 Clipsal 500 Adelaide, known for naming rights reasons as the 2008 Clipsal 500, was Round 1 of the 2008 V8 Supercar Championship Series. It was held from 21 to 24 February around the inner city streets of Adelaide, the capital of South Australia. The Adelaide 500 is a unique event where the round results are determined by the results from the second race, rather that the driver with the most points from the weekend. This means that the winner of the round does not necessarily lead the championship after the event.

== Qualifying ==
Qualify was held on Friday 22 February. Jamie Whincup broke the qualifying lap record to snare pole position. James Courtney put himself on the front row in second position with Mark Winterbottom completing a Ford top three. Defending champion Garth Tander fulfilled on early promise at his new team to be best Holden in fourth position.

== Race 1 ==
Race 1 was held on Saturday 23 February.

Jamie Whincup was slow away, allowing Garth Tander and James Courtney to force the pace early with Courtney breaking away to a five-second lead. Courtney's lead was squandered after a clash in the Senna Chicane while lapping Jason Richards saw a tyre cut and shredded. Tander later disappeared downfield with suspension damage. Mark Winterbottom led towards the end of the race until a late race safety car period, caused by a clash between HSV Dealer Team teammates Rick Kelly and Paul Dumbrell bunched the field up allowing Whincup, who had earlier had a voltage problem leading to a battery change after 12 laps, to charge through the field, passing Winterbottom with two laps to go to win. Teammate Craig Lowndes, hampered by a jammed anti-roll bar, finished third behind Winterbottom, with Lee Holdsworth the first Holden home in fourth place.

It was an excellent result for the three of the four senior Ford teams, Team Vodafone putting both cars on the podium, Ford Performance Racing were second and fifth, with sixth and seventh filled by Jim Beam Racing.

Courtney, who finished in tenth position, was overnight relegated by the stewards to 16th position because of the clash with Jason Richards, and another similar clash with the other Tasman Motorsport Commodore of Greg Murphy, which also cost him 31 series points.

== Race 2 ==
Race 2 was held on Sunday 24 February. Mark Winterbottom lead the race early on with Jamie Whincup moving into the lead before the compulsory pit stops began. Whincup resumed in the lead for much of the remainder of the race, but the minor placings became controversial after a number of overtaking incidents and clashes while overtaking punctuated the race, ending with a collision between James Courtney and Craig Lowndes on lap 55 as Lowndes was overtaking Courtney, the incident also eliminating Winterbottom. After the restart Steven Johnson was controversially assigned a driver-through penalty after overtaking Fabian Coulthard before the restart of the race, although Coulthard's car was slowing and retired to the pits the same lap. Garth Tander also was removed in an overtaking incident, after contact with Johnson sent the Ford driver wide and off track, Tander was glanced by Courtney after losing momentum leaving himself vulnerable to a pass from the following car. The glancing blow triggered a second suspension failure for the defending champion.

With several top runners removed Cameron McConville moved into second for many laps before losing the place with only a few laps to go to Lee Holdsworth. The two Holden racers completed the podium with Todd Kelly making three Holdens in the top four. Fifth place was a career best result for New Zealand teenager Shane van Gisbergen who had only entering V8 Supercar late last year.

== Results ==
Results as follows:

=== Qualifying ===
Pos	No	Name	Car	Team	Part 3	Part 2	Part 1
1	88	(Australia) Jamie Whincup	Ford BF Falcon	Triple Eight Race Engineering	1:21.3301		
2	4	(Australia) James Courtney	Ford BF Falcon	Stone Brothers Racing	1:21.3406		
3	5	(Australia) Mark Winterbottom	Ford BF Falcon	Ford Performance Racing	1:21.6647		
4	1	(Australia) Garth Tander	Holden VE Commodore	Holden Racing Team	1:21.6930		
5	18	(Australia) Will Davison	Ford BF Falcon	Dick Johnson Racing	1:21.7557		
6	888	(Australia) Craig Lowndes	Ford BF Falcon	Triple Eight Race Engineering	1:21.8745		
7	33	(Australia) Lee Holdsworth	Holden VE Commodore	Garry Rogers Motorsport	1:21.9638		
8	17	(Australia) Steven Johnson	Ford BF Falcon	Dick Johnson Racing	1:22.0282		
9	6	(New Zealand) Steven Richards	Ford BF Falcon	Ford Performance Racing	1:22.0976		
10	16	(Australia) Paul Dumbrell	Holden VE Commodore	HSV Dealer Team	No time		
11	7	(Australia) Todd Kelly	Holden VE Commodore	Perkins Engineering		1:21.9779	
12	15	(Australia) Rick Kelly	Holden VE Commodore	HSV Dealer Team		1:22.0049	
13	9	(New Zealand) Shane van Gisbergen	Ford BF Falcon	Stone Brothers Racing		1:22.0814	
14	2	(Australia) Mark Skaife	Holden VE Commodore	Holden Racing Team		1:22.0939	
15	3	(New Zealand) Jason Richards	Holden VE Commodore	Tasman Motorsport		1:22.1513	
16	111	(New Zealand) Fabian Coulthard	Ford BF Falcon	Paul Cruickshank Racing		1:22.3425	
17	25	(Australia) Jason Bright	Ford BF Falcon	Britek Motorsport		1:22.3910	
18	39	(Australia) Russell Ingall	Holden VE Commodore	Paul Morris Motorsport		1:22.4469	
19	14	(Australia) Cameron McConville	Holden VE Commodore	Brad Jones Racing		1:22.4609	
20	51	(New Zealand) Greg Murphy	Holden VE Commodore	Tasman Motorsport		1:22.7538	
21	12	(Australia) Andrew Jones	Holden VE Commodore	Brad Jones Racing			1:22.7571
22	34	(Australia) Michael Caruso	Holden VE Commodore	Garry Rogers Motorsport			1:22.7915
23	11	(Australia) Shane Price	Holden VE Commodore	Perkins Engineering			1:22.9660
24	55	(Australia) Tony D'Alberto	Holden VE Commodore	Rod Nash Racing			1:23.0891
25	50	(Australia) Andrew Thompson	Holden VE Commodore	Paul Weel Racing			1:23.1461
26	67	(Australia) Paul Morris	Holden VE Commodore	Paul Morris Motorsport			1:23.6190
27	021	(New Zealand) Kayne Scott	Ford BF Falcon	Team Kiwi Racing			1:23.9923
28	26	(Australia) Marcus Marshall	Ford BF Falcon	Britek Motorsport			1:24.5641

=== Race 1 results ===
Pos	No	Name	Team	Vehicle	Laps	Time/Retired	Grid	Points
1	88	(Australia) Jamie Whincup	Triple Eight Race Engineering	Ford Falcon (BF)	78	1:51:37.3538	1	150
2	5	(Australia) Mark Winterbottom	Ford Performance Racing	Ford Falcon (BF)	78	+1.8s	3	138
3	888	(Australia) Craig Lowndes	Triple Eight Race Engineering	Ford Falcon (BF)	78	+2.5s	6	129
4	33	(Australia) Lee Holdsworth	Garry Rogers Motorsport	Holden Commodore (VE)	78	+2.9s	7	120
5	6	(New Zealand) Steven Richards	Ford Performance Racing	Ford Falcon (BF)	78	+4.1s	9	111
6	17	(Australia) Steven Johnson	Dick Johnson Racing	Ford Falcon (BF)	78	+7.5s	8	102
7	18	(Australia) Will Davison	Dick Johnson Racing	Ford Falcon (BF)	78	+11.0s	5	96
8	15	(Australia) Rick Kelly	HSV Dealer Team	Holden Commodore (VE)	78	+17.4s	12	90
9	2	(Australia) Mark Skaife	Holden Racing Team	Holden Commodore (VE)	78	+19.1s	14	84
10	51	(New Zealand) Greg Murphy	Tasman Motorsport	Holden Commodore (VE)	78	+22.0s	20	78
11	111	(New Zealand) Fabian Coulthard	Paul Cruickshank Racing	Ford Falcon (BF)	78	+22.2s	16	72
12	9	(New Zealand) Shane van Gisbergen	Stone Brothers Racing	Ford Falcon (BF)	78	+22.7s	13	69
13	3	(New Zealand) Jason Richards	Tasman Motorsport	Holden Commodore (VE)	78	+22.9s	15	66
14	39	(Australia) Russell Ingall	Paul Morris Motorsport	Holden Commodore (VE)	78	+25.5s	18	63
15	7	(Australia) Todd Kelly	Perkins Engineering	Holden Commodore (VE)	78	+35.9s	11	60
16	4	(Australia) James Courtney	Stone Brothers Racing	Ford Falcon (BF)	78	+42.9s	2	57
17	55	(Australia) Tony D'Alberto	Rod Nash Racing	Holden Commodore (VE)	77	+ 1 lap	24	54
18	12	(Australia) Andrew Jones	Brad Jones Racing	Holden Commodore (VE)	77	+ 1 lap	21	51
19	26	(Australia) Marcus Marshall	Britek Motorsport	Ford Falcon (BF)	76	+ 2 laps	28	48
20	50	(Australia) Andrew Thompson	Paul Weel Racing	Holden Commodore (VE)	76	+ 2 laps	25	45
21	11	(Australia) Shane Price	Perkins Engineering	Holden Commodore (VE)	74	+ 4 laps	23	42
22	021	(New Zealand) Kayne Scott	Team Kiwi Racing	Ford Falcon (BF)	71	+ 7 laps	27	39
23	1	(Australia) Garth Tander	Holden Racing Team	Holden Commodore (VE)	69	+ 9 laps	4	36
Ret	16	(Australia) Paul Dumbrell	HSV Dealer Team	Holden Commodore (VE)	67	Accident	10	
Ret	14	(Australia) Cameron McConville	Brad Jones Racing	Holden Commodore (VE)	63	Retired	19	
Ret	67	(Australia) Paul Morris	Paul Morris Motorsport	Holden Commodore (VE)	57	Engine	26	
Ret	25	(Australia) Jason Bright	Britek Motorsport	Ford Falcon (BF)	53	Retired	17	
Ret	34	(Australia) Michael Caruso	Garry Rogers Motorsport	Holden Commodore (VE)	29	Accident	22	
Fastest Lap: James Courtney (Stone Brothers Racing) - 1:22.6643 on lap 7

=== Race 2 results ===
Pos	No	Name	Team	Vehicle	Laps	Time/Retired	Grid	Points
1	88	(Australia) Jamie Whincup	Triple Eight Race Engineering	Ford Falcon (BF)	78	2:11:45.5992	1	150
2	33	(Australia) Lee Holdsworth	Garry Rogers Motorsport	Holden Commodore (VE)	78	+0.8s	4	138
3	14	(Australia) Cameron McConville	Brad Jones Racing	Holden Commodore (VE)	78	+1.7s	25	129
4	7	(Australia) Todd Kelly	Perkins Engineering	Holden Commodore (VE)	78	+2.2s	15	120
5	9	(New Zealand) Shane van Gisbergen	Stone Brothers Racing	Ford Falcon (BF)	78	+2.8s	12	111
6	15	(Australia) Rick Kelly	HSV Dealer Team	Holden Commodore (VE)	78	+3.4s	8	102
7	51	(New Zealand) Greg Murphy	Tasman Motorsport	Holden Commodore (VE)	78	+3.9s	10	96
8	3	(New Zealand) Jason Richards	Tasman Motorsport	Holden Commodore (VE)	78	+6.0s	13	90
9	17	(Australia) Steven Johnson	Dick Johnson Racing	Ford Falcon (BF)	78	+7.7s	6	84
10	25	(Australia) Jason Bright	Britek Motorsport	Ford Falcon (BF)	78	+9.0s	27	78
11	34	(Australia) Michael Caruso	Garry Rogers Motorsport	Holden Commodore (VE)	78	+9.3s	28	72
12	12	(Australia) Andrew Jones	Brad Jones Racing	Holden Commodore (VE)	78	+13.6s	18	69
13	26	(Australia) Marcus Marshall	Britek Motorsport	Ford Falcon (BF)	78	+14.1s	19	66
14	021	(New Zealand) Kayne Scott	Team Kiwi Racing	Ford Falcon (BF)	78	+14.8s	22	63
15	6	(New Zealand) Steven Richards	Ford Performance Racing	Ford Falcon (BF)	77	+1 lap	5	60
16	67	(Australia) Paul Morris	Paul Morris Motorsport	Holden Commodore (VE)	76	+2 laps	26	57
17	2	(Australia) Mark Skaife	Holden Racing Team	Holden Commodore (VE)	73	+5 laps	9	54
18	111	(New Zealand) Fabian Coulthard	Paul Cruickshank Racing	Ford Falcon (BF)	69	+9 laps	11	51
19	1	(Australia) Garth Tander	Holden Racing Team	Holden Commodore (VE)	67	+11 laps	23	48
Ret	55	(Australia) Tony D'Alberto	Rod Nash Racing	Holden Commodore (VE)	71	Suspension	17	
Ret	16	(Australia) Paul Dumbrell	HSV Dealer Team	Holden Commodore (VE)	66	Accident	24	
Ret	4	(Australia) James Courtney	Stone Brothers Racing	Ford Falcon (BF)	55	Accident	16	
Ret	888	(Australia) Craig Lowndes	Triple Eight Race Engineering	Ford Falcon (BF)	55	Accident	3	
Ret	5	(Australia) Mark Winterbottom	Ford Performance Racing	Ford Falcon (BF)	55	Accident	2	
Ret	50	(Australia) Andrew Thompson	Paul Weel Racing	Holden Commodore (VE)	46	Accident	20	
Ret	11	(Australia) Shane Price	Perkins Engineering	Holden Commodore (VE)	18	Engine	21	
Ret	18	(Australia) Will Davison	Dick Johnson Racing	Ford Falcon (BF)	5	Mechanical	7	
Ret	39	(Australia) Russell Ingall	Paul Morris Motorsport	Holden Commodore (VE)	2	Mechanical	14	
Fastest Lap: Jamie Whincup (Triple Eight Race Engineering) - 1:22.3564 on lap 32

== Notes ==
Ulladulla driver Ashley Cooper was involved in a high-speed accident on Saturday morning, after lap 11 in the second race of the Fujitsu series, the lead support category at the Adelaide 500, which utilises older V8 Supercars retired from the main series teams. The accident occurred at the notorious Turn 8 after Cooper clipped the barrier inside of the corners apex unsettling the car for the right hand bend and the car hit the wall on the outside of the corner broadside on. Cooper died on 25 February due to injuries sustained in the crash.

== Post race ==
Two incidents in the two races brought the attention of driving standards for the next round at Eastern Creek, the first was Jamie Whincup. During the first race he made contact with Mark Winterbottom with two laps to go. This gave Whincup the win and although race control looked at the incident, they decided that no action should be taken.

The second incident involved Craig Lowndes and James Courtney. On lap 56 Courtney was in second and Lowndes third. Coming into the hairpin (turn 9) Lowndes went straight down the inside of Courtney and going into turn 11 Courtney turned Lowndes around sending both into the wall. Mark Winterbottom was also caught up within the accident and all three were DNF'ed. The new Driving Standards Observer Tomas Mezera received plenty of criticism, because Lowndes already had done a similar move to Winterbottom and Lee Holdsworth a few laps before.

== Standings ==
After Round 1 of 14

Pos	No	Name	Team	Points
1	88	(Australia) Jamie Whincup	Triple Eight Race Engineering	300
2	33	(Australia) Lee Holdsworth	Garry Rogers Motorsport	258
3	15	(Australia) Rick Kelly	HSV Dealer Team	192
4	17	(Australia) Steven Johnson	Dick Johnson Racing	186
5	7	(Australia) Todd Kelly	Perkins Engineering	180
