= 2018 Darwin Triple Crown =

2018 V8 Supercar championship race

(Northern Territory) 2018 Darwin Triple Crown
Event Information
- Round 7 of 16 in the 2018 Supercars Championship
- Date: 15-17 June 2018
- Location: Darwin, Northern Territory
- Venue: Hidden Valley Raceway

Results
Race 1
Distance	42 laps	120.315 km
Pole position	(Australia) David Reynolds; Erebus Motorsport	1:05.8496
Winner	(New Zealand) Scott McLaughlin; DJR Team Penske	48:20.3119
Race 2
Distance	70 laps	200.524 km
Pole position	(Australia) Rick Kelly; Nissan Motorsport	1:05.8242
Winner	(Australia) David Reynolds; Erebus Motorsport	1:24:20.9958

The 2018 Darwin Triple Crown (formally known as 2018 CrownBet Darwin Triple Crown) was a motor racing event for the Supercars Championship, held on the weekend of 15-17 June 2018. The event was held at Hidden Valley Raceway near Darwin in the Northern Territory and consisted of two races, 120 and 200 kilometres in length. It was the seventh event of sixteen in the 2018 Supercars Championship and hosted Races 15 and 16 of the season.

== Results ==
=== Practice ===
Practice summary
Session	Day	Fastest lap				
Session	Day	No.	Driver	Team	Car	Time
Practice 1	Friday	15	(Australia) Rick Kelly	Nissan Motorsport	Nissan Altima L33	1:06.5065
Practice 2	Friday	17	(New Zealand) Scott McLaughlin	DJR Team Penske	Ford Falcon FG X	1:06.1587
Practice 3	Saturday	17	(New Zealand) Scott McLaughlin	DJR Team Penske	Ford Falcon FG X	1:06.1410

=== Race 15 ===
==== Qualifying ====
Pos.	No.	Name	Team	Car	Time	Gap	Grid
1	9	(Australia) David Reynolds	Erebus Motorsport	Holden Commodore ZB	1:05.8496		1
2	17	(New Zealand) Scott McLaughlin	DJR Team Penske	Ford Falcon FG X	1:05.8943	+0.0447	2
3	99	(Australia) Anton de Pasquale	Erebus Motorsport	Holden Commodore ZB	1:06.0133	+0.1637	3
4	15	(Australia) Rick Kelly	Nissan Motorsport	Nissan Altima L33	1:06.0254	+0.1758	4
5	97	(New Zealand) Shane van Gisbergen	Triple Eight Race Engineering	Holden Commodore ZB	1:06.0561	+0.2065	5
6	1	(Australia) Jamie Whincup	Triple Eight Race Engineering	Holden Commodore ZB	1:06.1263	+0.2767	6
7	7	(New Zealand) Andre Heimgartner	Nissan Motorsport	Nissan Altima L33	1:06.1652	+0.3156	7
8	2	(Australia) Scott Pye	Walkinshaw Andretti United	Holden Commodore ZB	1:06.1728	+0.3232	8
9	23	(Australia) Michael Caruso	Nissan Motorsport	Nissan Altima L33	1:06.2077	+0.3581	9
10	230	(Australia) Will Davison	23Red Racing	Ford Falcon FG X	1:06.2292	+0.3796	10
11	14	(Australia) Tim Slade	Brad Jones Racing	Holden Commodore ZB	1:06.2354	+0.3858	11
12	888	(Australia) Craig Lowndes	Triple Eight Race Engineering	Holden Commodore ZB	1:06.2376	+0.3880	12
13	33	(Australia) Garth Tander	Garry Rogers Motorsport	Holden Commodore ZB	1:06.2493	+0.3997	13
14	12	(New Zealand) Fabian Coulthard	DJR Team Penske	Ford Falcon FG X	1:06.2535	+0.4039	14
15	8	(Australia) Nick Percat	Brad Jones Racing	Holden Commodore ZB	1:06.3004	+0.4508	15
16	5	(Australia) Mark Winterbottom	Tickford Racing	Ford Falcon FG X	1:06.3008	+0.4512	16
17	55	(Australia) Chaz Mostert	Tickford Racing	Ford Falcon FG X	1:06.3021	+0.4525	17
18	6	(Australia) Cam Waters	Tickford Racing	Ford Falcon FG X	1:06.3441	+0.4945	18
19	21	(Australia) Tim Blanchard	Tim Blanchard Racing	Holden Commodore ZB	1:06.3461	+0.4965	19
20	18	(Australia) Lee Holdsworth	Team 18	Holden Commodore ZB	1:06.4234	+0.5738	20
21	34	(Australia) James Golding	Garry Rogers Motorsport	Holden Commodore ZB	1:06.4312	+0.5816	21
22	56	(New Zealand) Richie Stanaway	Tickford Racing	Ford Falcon FG X	1:06.4385	+0.5889	22
23	25	(Australia) James Courtney	Walkinshaw Andretti United	Holden Commodore ZB	1:06.5198	+0.6702	23
24	78	(Switzerland) Simona de Silvestro	Nissan Motorsport	Nissan Altima L33	1:06.5601	+0.7105	24
25	4	(Australia) Macauley Jones	Brad Jones Racing	Holden Commodore ZB	1:06.6496	+0.8000	25
26	19	(Australia) Jack Le Brocq	Tekno Autosports	Holden Commodore ZB	1:06.7826	+0.9330	26
27	35	(Australia) Todd Hazelwood	Matt Stone Racing	Ford Falcon FG X	1:06.7957	+0.9461	27

==== Race ====
Pos	No.	Driver	Team	Car	Laps	Time / Retired	Grid	Points
1	17	(New Zealand) Scott McLaughlin	DJR Team Penske	Ford Falcon FG X	42	48:20.3119	2	150
2	97	(New Zealand) Shane van Gisbergen	Triple Eight Race Engineering	Holden Commodore ZB	42	+0.4245	5	138
3	9	(Australia) David Reynolds	Erebus Motorsport	Holden Commodore ZB	42	+1.2642	1	129
4	2	(Australia) Scott Pye	Walkinshaw Andretti United	Holden Commodore ZB	42	+7.5254	8	120
5	33	(Australia) Garth Tander	Garry Rogers Motorsport	Holden Commodore ZB	42	+9.7763	13	111
6	15	(Australia) Rick Kelly	Nissan Motorsport	Nissan Altima L33	42	+19.3449	4	102
7	888	(Australia) Craig Lowndes	Triple Eight Race Engineering	Holden Commodore ZB	42	+19.6445	12	96
8	1	(Australia) Jamie Whincup	Triple Eight Race Engineering	Holden Commodore ZB	42	+19.8871	6	90
9	8	(Australia) Nick Percat	Brad Jones Racing	Holden Commodore ZB	42	+20.9316	15	84
10	23	(Australia) Michael Caruso	Nissan Motorsport	Nissan Altima L33	42	+21.0186	9	78
11	99	(Australia) Anton de Pasquale	Erebus Motorsport	Holden Commodore ZB	42	+24.1342	3	72
12	6	(Australia) Cam Waters	Tickford Racing	Ford Falcon FG X	42	+24.6999	18	69
13	230	(Australia) Will Davison	23Red Racing	Ford Falcon FG X	42	+26.7365	10	66
14	14	(Australia) Tim Slade	Brad Jones Racing	Holden Commodore ZB	42	+27.4649	11	63
15	12	(New Zealand) Fabian Coulthard	DJR Team Penske	Ford Falcon FG X	42	+28.9352	14	60
16	7	(New Zealand) Andre Heimgartner	Nissan Motorsport	Nissan Altima L33	42	+29.3763	7	57
17	55	(Australia) Chaz Mostert	Tickford Racing	Ford Falcon FG X	42	+30.9085	17	54
18	19	(Australia) Jack Le Brocq	Tekno Autosports	Holden Commodore ZB	42	+31.7066	26	51
19	21	(Australia) Tim Blanchard	Tim Blanchard Racing	Holden Commodore ZB	42	+35.6882	19	48
20	5	(Australia) Mark Winterbottom	Tickford Racing	Ford Falcon FG X	42	+36.4191	16	45
21	18	(Australia) Lee Holdsworth	Team 18	Holden Commodore ZB	42	+37.7174	20	42
22	78	(Switzerland) Simona de Silvestro	Nissan Motorsport	Nissan Altima L33	42	+40.0310	24	39
23	25	(Australia) James Courtney	Walkinshaw Andretti United	Holden Commodore ZB	42	+45.0416	23	36
24	35	(Australia) Todd Hazelwood	Matt Stone Racing	Ford Falcon FG X	42	+46.1347	27	33
25	56	(New Zealand) Richie Stanaway	Tickford Racing	Ford Falcon FG X	42	+49.7981^{1}	22	30
26	34	(Australia) James Golding	Garry Rogers Motorsport	Holden Commodore ZB	42	+1:00.0611^{2}	21	27
27	4	(Australia) Macauley Jones	Brad Jones Racing	Holden Commodore ZB	41	+1 lap	25	24
Fastest lap: Will Davison (23Red Racing) 1:06.8789 (on lap 34)

Notes

- ^1– Richie Stanaway received a 5-second Time Penalty for Careless Driving, causing contact with James Courtney.
- ^2– James Golding received a 15-second Time Penalty for Careless Driving, causing contact with Cam Waters, which then contacts with Mark Winterbottom.

==== Championship standings after Race 15 ====
Drivers Championship

	Pos	Driver	Pts	Gap
	1	(New Zealand) Scott McLaughlin	1637	
	2	(New Zealand) Shane van Gisbergen	1494	-143
1	3	(Australia) David Reynolds	1298	-339
1	4	(Australia) Craig Lowndes	1284	-353
1	5	(Australia) Scott Pye	1234	-403

Teams Championship

	Pos	Team	Pts	Gap
	1	DJR Team Penske	2776	
	2	Triple Eight Race Engineering (1, 97)	2707	-69
	3	Walkinshaw Andretti United	2266	-510
	4	Brad Jones Racing	2031	-745
1	5	Erebus Motorsport	1990	-786

- Note: Only the top five positions are included for both sets of standings.

=== Race 16 ===
==== Qualifying ====
Pos.	No.	Name	Team	Car	Time	Gap	Grid
1	17	(New Zealand) Scott McLaughlin	DJR Team Penske	Ford Falcon FG X	1:05.5538		Top 10
2	25	(Australia) James Courtney	Walkinshaw Andretti United	Holden Commodore ZB	1:05.7610	+0.2072	Top 10
3	99	(Australia) Anton de Pasquale	Erebus Motorsport	Holden Commodore ZB	1:05.7801	+0.2263	Top 10
4	12	(New Zealand) Fabian Coulthard	DJR Team Penske	Ford Falcon FG X	1:05.7934	+0.2396	Top 10
5	8	(Australia) Nick Percat	Brad Jones Racing	Holden Commodore ZB	1:05.8336	+0.2798	Top 10
6	15	(Australia) Rick Kelly	Nissan Motorsport	Nissan Altima L33	1:05.8807	+0.3269	Top 10
7	1	(Australia) Jamie Whincup	Triple Eight Race Engineering	Holden Commodore ZB	1:05.8842	+0.3304	Top 10
8	33	(Australia) Garth Tander	Garry Rogers Motorsport	Holden Commodore ZB	1:05.8874	+0.3336	Top 10
9	23	(Australia) Michael Caruso	Nissan Motorsport	Nissan Altima L33	1:05.8903	+0.3365	Top 10
10	9	(Australia) David Reynolds	Erebus Motorsport	Holden Commodore ZB	1:05.8918	+0.3380	Top 10
11	97	(New Zealand) Shane van Gisbergen	Triple Eight Race Engineering	Holden Commodore ZB	1:05.8999	+0.3461	11
12	7	(New Zealand) Andre Heimgartner	Nissan Motorsport	Nissan Altima L33	1:05.9102	+0.3564	12
13	55	(Australia) Chaz Mostert	Tickford Racing	Ford Falcon FG X	1:05.9324	+0.3786	13
14	888	(Australia) Craig Lowndes	Triple Eight Race Engineering	Holden Commodore ZB	1:05.9749	+0.4211	14
15	14	(Australia) Tim Slade	Brad Jones Racing	Holden Commodore ZB	1:05.9877	+0.4339	15
16	6	(Australia) Cam Waters	Tickford Racing	Ford Falcon FG X	1:06.1110	+0.5572	16
17	78	(Switzerland) Simona de Silvestro	Nissan Motorsport	Nissan Altima L33	1:06.1354	+0.5816	17
18	230	(Australia) Will Davison	23Red Racing	Ford Falcon FG X	1:06.1403	+0.5865	18
19	2	(Australia) Scott Pye	Walkinshaw Andretti United	Holden Commodore ZB	1:06.1470	+0.5932	19
20	19	(Australia) Jack Le Brocq	Tekno Autosports	Holden Commodore ZB	1:06.1554	+0.6016	20
21	21	(Australia) Tim Blanchard	Tim Blanchard Racing	Holden Commodore ZB	1:06.1637	+0.6099	21
22	18	(Australia) Lee Holdsworth	Team 18	Holden Commodore ZB	1:06.1690	+0.6152	22
23	34	(Australia) James Golding	Garry Rogers Motorsport	Holden Commodore ZB	1:06.1913	+0.6375	23
24	5	(Australia) Mark Winterbottom	Tickford Racing	Ford Falcon FG X	1:06.2139	+0.6601	24
25	4	(Australia) Macauley Jones	Brad Jones Racing	Holden Commodore ZB	1:06.4314	+0.8776	25
26	56	(New Zealand) Richie Stanaway	Tickford Racing	Ford Falcon FG X	1:06.4599	+0.9061	26
27	35	(Australia) Todd Hazelwood	Matt Stone Racing	Ford Falcon FG X	1:06.6948	+1.1410	27

==== Top 10 Shootout ====
Pos.	No.	Driver	Team	Car	Time	Gap	Grid
1	15	(Australia) Rick Kelly	Nissan Motorsport	Nissan Altima L33	1:05.8242		1
2	17	(New Zealand) Scott McLaughlin	DJR Team Penske	Ford Falcon FG X	1:05.8749	+0.0547	2
3	1	(Australia) Jamie Whincup	Triple Eight Race Engineering	Holden Commodore ZB	1:05.9201	+0.0959	3
4	9	(Australia) David Reynolds	Erebus Motorsport	Holden Commodore ZB	1:06.0310	+0.2068	4
5	8	(Australia) Nick Percat	Brad Jones Racing	Holden Commodore ZB	1:06.0354	+0.2112	5
6	33	(Australia) Garth Tander	Garry Rogers Motorsport	Holden Commodore ZB	1:06.0799	+0.2557	6
7	23	(Australia) Michael Caruso	Nissan Motorsport	Nissan Altima L33	1:06.1001	+0.2759	7
8	12	(New Zealand) Fabian Coulthard	DJR Team Penske	Ford Falcon FG X	1:06.2119	+0.3887	8
9	25	(Australia) James Courtney	Walkinshaw Andretti United	Holden Commodore ZB	1:06.2313	+0.4071	9
10	99	(Australia) Anton de Pasquale	Erebus Motorsport	Holden Commodore ZB	1:06.4291	+0.6049	10

==== Race ====
Pos	No.	Driver	Team	Car	Laps	Time / Retired	Grid	Points
1	9	(Australia) David Reynolds	Erebus Motorsport	Holden Commodore ZB	70	1:24:20.9958	4	150
2	17	(New Zealand) Scott McLaughlin	DJR Team Penske	Ford Falcon FG X	70	+1.6600	2	138
3	1	(Australia) Jamie Whincup	Triple Eight Race Engineering	Holden Commodore ZB	70	+2.2460	3	129
4	97	(New Zealand) Shane van Gisbergen	Triple Eight Race Engineering	Holden Commodore ZB	70	+5.3792	11	120
5	15	(Australia) Rick Kelly	Nissan Motorsport	Nissan Altima L33	70	+9.9828	1	111
6	8	(Australia) Nick Percat	Brad Jones Racing	Holden Commodore ZB	70	+10.4755	5	102
7	33	(Australia) Garth Tander	Garry Rogers Motorsport	Holden Commodore ZB	70	+11.4432	6	96
8	12	(New Zealand) Fabian Coulthard	DJR Team Penske	Ford Falcon FG X	70	+11.8025	8	90
9	23	(Australia) Michael Caruso	Nissan Motorsport	Nissan Altima L33	70	+12.2454	7	84
10	888	(Australia) Craig Lowndes	Triple Eight Race Engineering	Holden Commodore ZB	70	+12.6301	14	78
11	25	(Australia) James Courtney	Walkinshaw Andretti United	Holden Commodore ZB	70	+14.6411	9	72
12	55	(Australia) Chaz Mostert	Tickford Racing	Ford Falcon FG X	70	+15.1398	13	69
13	5	(Australia) Mark Winterbottom	Tickford Racing	Ford Falcon FG X	70	+16.2584	24	66
14	230	(Australia) Will Davison	23Red Racing	Ford Falcon FG X	70	+16.7331	18	63
15	99	(Australia) Anton de Pasquale	Erebus Motorsport	Holden Commodore ZB	70	+18.2086	10	60
16	7	(New Zealand) Andre Heimgartner	Nissan Motorsport	Nissan Altima L33	70	+19.0913	12	57
17	78	(Switzerland) Simona de Silvestro	Nissan Motorsport	Nissan Altima L33	70	+20.4352	17	54
18	21	(Australia) Tim Blanchard	Tim Blanchard Racing	Holden Commodore ZB	70	+20.8374	21	51
19	56	(New Zealand) Richie Stanaway	Tickford Racing	Ford Falcon FG X	70	+22.2494	26	48
20	2	(Australia) Scott Pye	Walkinshaw Andretti United	Holden Commodore ZB	70	+57.1919	19	45
21	14	(Australia) Tim Slade	Brad Jones Racing	Holden Commodore ZB	69	+1 lap	15	42
22	34	(Australia) James Golding	Garry Rogers Motorsport	Holden Commodore ZB	69	+1 lap	23	39
23	35	(Australia) Todd Hazelwood	Matt Stone Racing	Ford Falcon FG X	69	+1 lap^{1}	27	36
24	4	(Australia) Macauley Jones	Brad Jones Racing	Holden Commodore ZB	69	+1 lap	25	33
NC	6	(Australia) Cam Waters	Tickford Racing	Ford Falcon FG X	54	Retirement	16	
NC	18	(Australia) Lee Holdsworth	Team 18	Holden Commodore ZB	54	Retirement	22	
NC	19	(Australia) Jack Le Brocq	Tekno Autosports	Holden Commodore ZB	6	Retirement	20	
Fastest lap: Nick Percat (Brad Jones Racing) 1:06.5590 (on lap 18)

Notes

- ^1– Todd Hazelwood received a 15-second Time Penalty for exceeding the Pit Lane speed limit at Pit Entry.

==== Championship standings after Race 16 ====
Drivers' Championship standings

	Pos	Driver	Pts	Gap
	1	(New Zealand) Scott McLaughlin	1775	
	2	(New Zealand) Shane van Gisbergen	1614	-161
	3	(Australia) Craig Lowndes	1448	-327
	4	(Australia) David Reynolds	1362	-413
1	5	(Australia) Jamie Whincup	1342	-433

Teams Championship

	Pos	Team	Pts	Gap
	1	DJR Team Penske	3004	
	2	Triple Eight Race Engineering (1, 97)	2956	-48
	3	Walkinshaw Andretti United	2383	-621
1	4	Erebus Motorsport	2200	-804
1	5	Brad Jones Racing	2175	-829

- Note: Only the top five positions are included for both sets of standings.
