= 2018 Melbourne 400 =

2018 V8 Supercar championship race

(Victoria (state)) 2018 Melbourne 400
Event Information
- Round 2 of 16 in the 2018 Supercars Championship
- Layout of the Melbourne Grand Prix Circuit
- Date: 22-25 March 2018
- Location: Melbourne, Victoria
- Venue: Melbourne Grand Prix Circuit

Results
Race 1
Distance	25 laps	132.610 km
Pole position	(New Zealand) Scott McLaughlin; DJR Team Penske	1:54.6016
Winner	(New Zealand) Scott McLaughlin; DJR Team Penske	50:27.3334
Race 2
Distance	13 laps	68.957 km
Pole position	(Australia) Jamie Whincup; Triple Eight Race Engineering	1:54.9974
Winner	(Australia) Jamie Whincup; Triple Eight Race Engineering	31:49.4088
Race 3
Distance	25 laps	132.610 km
Pole position	(New Zealand) Scott McLaughlin; DJR Team Penske	1:55.1576
Winner	(Australia) Scott Pye; Walkinshaw Andretti United	52:16.7559
Race 4
Distance	11 laps	58.348 km
Pole position	(Australia) Jamie Whincup; Triple Eight Race Engineering	1:55.4777
Winner	(Australia) David Reynolds; Erebus Motorsport	25:58.6766

The 2018 Melbourne 400 (known for sponsorship reasons as the 2018 Coates Hire Supercars Melbourne 400) was a motor racing event for the Supercars Championship that was held on the weekend of 22 to 25 March 2018. The event was run at the Melbourne Grand Prix Circuit in Melbourne, Victoria, and marked the first running of the Melbourne 400. It was the second event of sixteen in the 2018 Supercars Championship and consisted of two races of 130 kilometres, and two races of 70 kilometers. The races were run in support of the 2018 Australian Grand Prix and marked the first time that the Supercars support races would be a points-paying round of the Supercars Championship.

== Results ==
=== Practice ===
Practice summary
Session	Day	Fastest lap				
Session	Day	No.	Driver	Team	Car	Time
Practice 1	Thursday	1	(Australia) Jamie Whincup	Triple Eight Race Engineering	Holden Commodore ZB	1:55.4067
Practice 2	Thursday	17	(New Zealand) Scott McLaughlin	DJR Team Penske	Ford Falcon FG X	1:55.2981

=== Race 3 ===
==== Qualifying ====
Pos.	No.	Driver	Team	Car	Time	Gap	Grid
1	17	(New Zealand) Scott McLaughlin	DJR Team Penske	Ford Falcon FG X	1:54.6016		1
2	12	(New Zealand) Fabian Coulthard	DJR Team Penske	Ford Falcon FG X	1:54.9312	+0.3297	2
3	1	(Australia) Jamie Whincup	Triple Eight Race Engineering	Holden Commodore ZB	1:54.9782	+0.3766	3
4	55	(Australia) Chaz Mostert	Tickford Racing	Ford Falcon FG X	1:55.3096	+0.7080	4
5	97	(New Zealand) Shane van Gisbergen	Triple Eight Race Engineering	Holden Commodore ZB	1:55.3148	+0.7132	5
6	9	(Australia) David Reynolds	Erebus Motorsport	Holden Commodore ZB	1:55.3205	+0.7189	6
7	8	(Australia) Nick Percat	Brad Jones Racing	Holden Commodore ZB	1:55.3571	+0.7555	7
8	2	(Australia) Scott Pye	Walkinshaw Andretti United	Holden Commodore ZB	1:55.4792	+0.8776	8
9	6	(Australia) Cam Waters	Tickford Racing	Ford Falcon FG X	1:55.5424	+0.9408	9
10	33	(Australia) Garth Tander	Garry Rogers Motorsport	Holden Commodore ZB	1:55.6453	+1.0437	10
11	14	(Australia) Tim Slade	Brad Jones Racing	Holden Commodore ZB	1:55.6571	+1.0555	11
12	18	(Australia) Lee Holdsworth	Team 18	Holden Commodore ZB	1:55.9581	+1.3565	12
13	99	(Australia) Anton de Pasquale	Erebus Motorsport	Holden Commodore ZB	1:55.9747	+1.3731	13
14	7	(New Zealand) Andre Heimgartner	Nissan Motorsport	Nissan Altima L33	1:56.1152	+1.5136	14
15	5	(Australia) Mark Winterbottom	Tickford Racing	Ford Falcon FG X	1:56.1568	+1.5552	15
16	230	(Australia) Will Davison	23Red Racing	Ford Falcon FG X	1:56.1739	+1.5723	16
17	888	(Australia) Craig Lowndes	Triple Eight Race Engineering	Holden Commodore ZB	1:56.3194	+1.7178	17
18	15	(Australia) Rick Kelly	Nissan Motorsport	Nissan Altima L33	1:56.4008	+1.7993	18
19	19	(Australia) Jack Le Brocq	Tekno Autosports	Holden Commodore ZB	1:56.4169	+1.8153	19
20	25	(Australia) James Courtney	Walkinshaw Andretti United	Holden Commodore ZB	1:56.7086	+2.1071	20
21	78	(Switzerland) Simona de Silvestro	Nissan Motorsport	Nissan Altima L33	1:56.7399	+2.1383	21
22	34	(Australia) James Golding	Garry Rogers Motorsport	Holden Commodore ZB	1:56.8673	+2.2657	22
23	56	(New Zealand) Richie Stanaway	Tickford Racing	Ford Falcon FG X	1:56.0845	+2.4829	23
24	23	(Australia) Michael Caruso	Nissan Motorsport	Nissan Altima L33	1:56.5446	+2.9430	24
25	21	(Australia) Tim Blanchard	Tim Blanchard Racing	Holden Commodore ZB	1:56.7028	+3.1012	25
26	35	(Australia) Todd Hazelwood	Matt Stone Racing	Ford Falcon FG X	2:10.8889	+16.2873	26^{1}

Notes

- ^1– Todd Hazelwood, although his best time exceeded the specified qualifying time cut-off, the Stewards gave him permission to race.

==== Race ====
Pos	No.	Driver	Team	Car	Laps	Time / Retired	Grid	Points
1	17	(New Zealand) Scott McLaughlin	DJR Team Penske	Ford Falcon FG X	25	50:27.3333	1	100
2	1	(Australia) Jamie Whincup	Triple Eight Race Engineering	Holden Commodore ZB	25	+1.3040	3	92
3	12	(New Zealand) Fabian Coulthard	DJR Team Penske	Ford Falcon FG X	25	+2.3139	2	86
4	97	(New Zealand) Shane van Gisbergen	Triple Eight Race Engineering	Holden Commodore ZB	25	+11.5501	5	80
5	55	(Australia) Chaz Mostert	Tickford Racing	Ford Falcon FG X	25	+13.1104	4	74
6	2	(Australia) Scott Pye	Walkinshaw Andretti United	Holden Commodore ZB	25	+14.5371	8	68
7	9	(Australia) David Reynolds	Erebus Motorsport	Holden Commodore ZB	25	+15.4476	6	64
8	33	(Australia) Garth Tander	Garry Rogers Motorsport	Holden Commodore ZB	25	+16.5209	10	60
9	8	(Australia) Nick Percat	Brad Jones Racing	Holden Commodore ZB	25	+18.5936	7	56
10	14	(Australia) Tim Slade	Brad Jones Racing	Holden Commodore ZB	25	+21.5637	11	52
11	6	(Australia) Cam Waters	Tickford Racing	Ford Falcon FG X	25	+24.0565	9	48
12	25	(Australia) James Courtney	Walkinshaw Andretti United	Holden Commodore ZB	25	+27.1645	20	46
13	23	(Australia) Michael Caruso	Nissan Motorsport	Nissan Altima L33	25	+29.3104	24	44
14	5	(Australia) Mark Winterbottom	Tickford Racing	Ford Falcon FG X	25	+32.2897	15	42
15	99	(Australia) Anton de Pasquale	Erebus Motorsport	Holden Commodore ZB	25	+33.5805	13	40
16	888	(Australia) Craig Lowndes	Triple Eight Race Engineering	Holden Commodore ZB	25	+39.1634	17	38
17	15	(Australia) Rick Kelly	Nissan Motorsport	Nissan Altima L33	25	+40.3264	18	36
18	7	(New Zealand) Andre Heimgartner	Nissan Motorsport	Nissan Altima L33	25	+42.3939	14	34
19	18	(Australia) Lee Holdsworth	Team 18	Holden Commodore ZB	25	+44.4747	12	32
20	19	(Australia) Jack Le Brocq	Tekno Autosports	Holden Commodore ZB	25	+45.6380	19	30
21	34	(Australia) James Golding	Garry Rogers Motorsport	Holden Commodore ZB	25	+48.6625	22	28
22	35	(Australia) Todd Hazelwood	Matt Stone Racing	Ford Falcon FG X	25	+51.8006	26	26
23	21	(Australia) Tim Blanchard	Tim Blanchard Racing	Holden Commodore ZB	25	+1:13.2437	25	24
24	56	(New Zealand) Richie Stanaway	Tickford Racing	Ford Falcon FG X	25	+1:33.6524	23	22
25	230	(Australia) Will Davison	23Red Racing	Ford Falcon FG X	25	+1:35.5942	16	20
NC	78	(Switzerland) Simona de Silvestro	Nissan Motorsport	Nissan Altima L33	3	Accident damage	21	
Fastest lap: Tim Slade (Brad Jones Racing) 1:57.1941 (on lap 15)

==== Championship standings after Race 3 ====
Drivers Championship

	Pos	Driver	Pts	Gap
	1	(New Zealand) Shane van Gisbergen	380	
	2	(Australia) David Reynolds	322	-56
2	3	(New Zealand) Scott McLaughlin	307	-73
	4	(Australia) Chaz Mostert	290	-90
2	5	(Australia) James Courtney	286	-94

Teams Championship

	Pos	Team	Pts	Gap
1	1	Triple Eight Race Engineering (1, 97)	574	
1	2	Walkinshaw Andretti United	522	-52
	3	Tickford Racing (5, 55)	509	-65
1	4	DJR Team Penske	492	-82
1	5	Erebus Motorsport	434	-140

- Note: Only the top five positions are included for both sets of standings.

=== Race 4 ===
==== Qualifying ====
Pos.	No.	Driver	Team	Car	Time	Gap	Grid
1	1	(Australia) Jamie Whincup	Triple Eight Race Engineering	Holden Commodore ZB	1:54.9974		1
2	17	(New Zealand) Scott McLaughlin	DJR Team Penske	Ford Falcon FG X	1:55.0855	+0.0881	2
3	12	(New Zealand) Fabian Coulthard	DJR Team Penske	Ford Falcon FG X	1:55.3880	+0.3906	3
4	6	(Australia) Cam Waters	Tickford Racing	Ford Falcon FG X	1:55.5720	+0.5746	4
5	8	(Australia) Nick Percat	Brad Jones Racing	Holden Commodore ZB	1:55.5827	+0.5853	5
6	23	(Australia) Michael Caruso	Nissan Motorsport	Nissan Altima L33	1:55.5920	+0.5946	6
7	97	(New Zealand) Shane van Gisbergen	Triple Eight Race Engineering	Holden Commodore ZB	1:55.5938	+0.5964	7
8	9	(Australia) David Reynolds	Erebus Motorsport	Holden Commodore ZB	1:55.6296	+0.6322	8
9	55	(Australia) Chaz Mostert	Tickford Racing	Ford Falcon FG X	1:55.6387	+0.6413	9
10	5	(Australia) Mark Winterbottom	Tickford Racing	Ford Falcon FG X	1:55.8122	+0.8148	10
11	14	(Australia) Tim Slade	Brad Jones Racing	Holden Commodore ZB	1:55.8338	+0.8364	11
12	15	(Australia) Rick Kelly	Nissan Motorsport	Nissan Altima L33	1:55.9128	+0.9154	12
13	230	(Australia) Will Davison	23Red Racing	Ford Falcon FG X	1:56.0022	+1.0048	13
14	2	(Australia) Scott Pye	Walkinshaw Andretti United	Holden Commodore ZB	1:56.0092	+1.0118	14
15	18	(Australia) Lee Holdsworth	Team 18	Holden Commodore ZB	1:56.1056	+1.1082	15
16	99	(Australia) Anton de Pasquale	Erebus Motorsport	Holden Commodore ZB	1:56.2864	+1.2890	16
17	7	(New Zealand) Andre Heimgartner	Nissan Motorsport	Nissan Altima L33	1:56.2886	+1.2912	17
18	21	(Australia) Tim Blanchard	Tim Blanchard Racing	Holden Commodore ZB	1:56.4050	+1.4076	18
19	34	(Australia) James Golding	Garry Rogers Motorsport	Holden Commodore ZB	1:56.4381	+1.4407	24^{1}
20	19	(Australia) Jack Le Brocq	Tekno Autosports	Holden Commodore ZB	1:56.5009	+1.5035	19
21	78	(Switzerland) Simona de Silvestro	Nissan Motorsport	Nissan Altima L33	1:56.7025	+1.7051	20
22	35	(Australia) Todd Hazelwood	Matt Stone Racing	Ford Falcon FG X	1:56.7122	+1.7148	21
23	25	(Australia) James Courtney	Walkinshaw Andretti United	Holden Commodore ZB	1:56.9111	+1.9137	22
24	33	(Australia) Garth Tander	Garry Rogers Motorsport	Holden Commodore ZB	1:56.9992	+2.0018	23
25	56	(New Zealand) Richie Stanaway	Tickford Racing	Ford Falcon FG X	1:57.0642	+2.0668	25
26	888	(Australia) Craig Lowndes	Triple Eight Race Engineering	Holden Commodore ZB	1:57.0811	+2.0837	26

Notes

- ^1– James Golding received a 5-place grid penalty for impeding Craig Lowndes during qualifying.

==== Race ====
Pos	No.	Driver	Team	Car	Laps	Time / Retired	Grid	Points
1	1	(Australia) Jamie Whincup	Triple Eight Race Engineering	Holden Commodore ZB	13	31:49.4088	1	50
2	17	(New Zealand) Scott McLaughlin	DJR Team Penske	Ford Falcon FG X	13	+4.2035	2	46
3	12	(New Zealand) Fabian Coulthard	DJR Team Penske	Ford Falcon FG X	13	+4.9979	3	43
4	97	(New Zealand) Shane van Gisbergen	Triple Eight Race Engineering	Holden Commodore ZB	13	+9.2907	7	40
5	6	(Australia) Cam Waters	Tickford Racing	Ford Falcon FG X	13	+10.0804	4	37
6	55	(Australia) Chaz Mostert	Tickford Racing	Ford Falcon FG X	13	+13.1042	9	34
7	8	(Australia) Nick Percat	Brad Jones Racing	Holden Commodore ZB	13	+15.3435	5	32
8	23	(Australia) Michael Caruso	Nissan Motorsport	Nissan Altima L33	13	+15.8240	6	30
9	5	(Australia) Mark Winterbottom	Tickford Racing	Ford Falcon FG X	13	+16.5640	10	28
10	14	(Australia) Tim Slade	Brad Jones Racing	Holden Commodore ZB	13	+17.5132	11	26
11	2	(Australia) Scott Pye	Walkinshaw Andretti United	Holden Commodore ZB	13	+22.9064	14	24
12	9	(Australia) David Reynolds	Erebus Motorsport	Holden Commodore ZB	13	+25.1086	8	23
13	15	(Australia) Rick Kelly	Nissan Motorsport	Nissan Altima L33	13	+27.2083	12	22
14	230	(Australia) Will Davison	23Red Racing	Ford Falcon FG X	13	+27.6782	13	21
15	18	(Australia) Lee Holdsworth	Team 18	Holden Commodore ZB	13	+28.0843	15	20
16	7	(New Zealand) Andre Heimgartner	Nissan Motorsport	Nissan Altima L33	13	+30.9099	17	19
17	34	(Australia) James Golding	Garry Rogers Motorsport	Holden Commodore ZB	13	+39.8109	24	18
18	33	(Australia) Garth Tander	Garry Rogers Motorsport	Holden Commodore ZB	13	+41.8826	23	17
19	99	(Australia) Anton de Pasquale	Erebus Motorsport	Holden Commodore ZB	13	+42.6417	16	16
20	25	(Australia) James Courtney	Walkinshaw Andretti United	Holden Commodore ZB	13	+43.8835	22	15
21	21	(Australia) Tim Blanchard	Tim Blanchard Racing	Holden Commodore ZB	13	+48.0326	18	14
22	19	(Australia) Jack Le Brocq	Tekno Autosports	Holden Commodore ZB	13	+49.2373^{1}	19	13
23	78	(Switzerland) Simona de Silvestro	Nissan Motorsport	Nissan Altima L33	13	+1:31.3428	20	12
NC	888	(Australia) Craig Lowndes	Triple Eight Race Engineering	Holden Commodore ZB	9	Retirement	26	
NC	56	(New Zealand) Richie Stanaway	Tickford Racing	Ford Falcon FG X	9	Retirement	25	
NC	35	(Australia) Todd Hazelwood	Matt Stone Racing	Ford Falcon FG X	3	Retirement	21	
Fastest lap: Jamie Whincup (Triple Eight Race Engineering) 2:13.0872 (on lap 5)

Notes

- ^1– Jack Le Brocq received a 15-second Time Penalty for Careless Driving, causing contact with James Courtney.

==== Championship standings after Race 4 ====
Drivers Championship

	Pos	Driver	Pts	Gap
	1	(New Zealand) Shane van Gisbergen	420	
1	2	(New Zealand) Scott McLaughlin	353	-67
1	3	(Australia) David Reynolds	345	-75
	4	(Australia) Chaz Mostert	324	-96
	5	(Australia) James Courtney	301	-119

Teams Championship

	Pos	Team	Pts	Gap
	1	Triple Eight Race Engineering (1, 97)	664	
2	2	DJR Team Penske	581	-83
	3	Tickford Racing (5, 55)	571	-93
2	4	Walkinshaw Andretti United	561	-103
	5	Erebus Motorsport	473	-191

- Note: Only the top five positions are included for both sets of standings.

=== Race 5 ===
==== Qualifying ====
Pos.	No.	Driver	Team	Car	Time	Gap	Grid
1	17	(New Zealand) Scott McLaughlin	DJR Team Penske	Ford Falcon FG X	1:55.1576		1
2	8	(Australia) Nick Percat	Brad Jones Racing	Holden Commodore ZB	1:55.3121	+0.1545	2
3	2	(Australia) Scott Pye	Walkinshaw Andretti United	Holden Commodore ZB	1:55.4181	+0.2605	3
4	1	(Australia) Jamie Whincup	Triple Eight Race Engineering	Holden Commodore ZB	1:55.5744	+0.4168	4
5	14	(Australia) Tim Slade	Brad Jones Racing	Holden Commodore ZB	1:55.5841	+0.4265	5
6	55	(Australia) Chaz Mostert	Tickford Racing	Ford Falcon FG X	1:55.6534	+0.4958	6
7	12	(New Zealand) Fabian Coulthard	DJR Team Penske	Ford Falcon FG X	1:55.7604	+0.6028	7
8	23	(Australia) Michael Caruso	Nissan Motorsport	Nissan Altima L33	1:55.7936	+0.6360	8
9	9	(Australia) David Reynolds	Erebus Motorsport	Holden Commodore ZB	1:55.8202	+0.6626	9
10	888	(Australia) Craig Lowndes	Triple Eight Race Engineering	Holden Commodore ZB	1:55.8516	+0.6940	10
11	25	(Australia) James Courtney	Walkinshaw Andretti United	Holden Commodore ZB	1:55.9946	+0.8371	11
12	5	(Australia) Mark Winterbottom	Tickford Racing	Ford Falcon FG X	1:56.0122	+0.8546	12
13	99	(Australia) Anton de Pasquale	Erebus Motorsport	Holden Commodore ZB	1:56.0816	+0.9241	13
14	33	(Australia) Garth Tander	Garry Rogers Motorsport	Holden Commodore ZB	1:56.1326	+0.9750	14
15	7	(New Zealand) Andre Heimgartner	Nissan Motorsport	Nissan Altima L33	1:56.1449	+0.9873	15
16	15	(Australia) Rick Kelly	Nissan Motorsport	Nissan Altima L33	1:56.1778	+1.0203	16
17	97	(New Zealand) Shane van Gisbergen	Triple Eight Race Engineering	Holden Commodore ZB	1:56.3884	+1.2308	17
18	78	(Switzerland) Simona de Silvestro	Nissan Motorsport	Nissan Altima L33	1:56.5177	+1.3601	18
19	230	(Australia) Will Davison	23Red Racing	Ford Falcon FG X	1:56.6207	+1.4631	19
20	34	(Australia) James Golding	Garry Rogers Motorsport	Holden Commodore ZB	1:56.6627	+1.5051	20
21	21	(Australia) Tim Blanchard	Tim Blanchard Racing	Holden Commodore ZB	1:56.6871	+1.5295	21
22	6	(Australia) Cam Waters	Tickford Racing	Ford Falcon FG X	1:56.8657	+1.7082	22
23	19	(Australia) Jack Le Brocq	Tekno Autosports	Holden Commodore ZB	1:56.9542	+1.7966	23
24	18	(Australia) Lee Holdsworth	Team 18	Holden Commodore ZB	1:57.0785	+1.9209	24
25	56	(New Zealand) Richie Stanaway	Tickford Racing	Ford Falcon FG X	1:57.1634	+2.0058	25
26	35	(Australia) Todd Hazelwood	Matt Stone Racing	Ford Falcon FG X	1:57.3529	+2.1954	26^{1}

Notes

- ^1– Todd Hazelwood received a 5-place grid penalty for impeding Lee Holdsworth during qualifying.

==== Race ====
Pos	No.	Driver	Team	Car	Laps	Time / Retired	Grid	Points
1	2	(Australia) Scott Pye	Walkinshaw Andretti United	Holden Commodore ZB	25	52:16.7559	3	100
2	1	(Australia) Jamie Whincup	Triple Eight Race Engineering	Holden Commodore ZB	25	+0.2612	4	92
3	8	(Australia) Nick Percat	Brad Jones Racing	Holden Commodore ZB	25	+1.0259	2	86
4	14	(Australia) Tim Slade	Brad Jones Racing	Holden Commodore ZB	25	+5.5405	5	80
5	25	(Australia) James Courtney	Walkinshaw Andretti United	Holden Commodore ZB	25	+9.5620	11	74
6	888	(Australia) Craig Lowndes	Triple Eight Race Engineering	Holden Commodore ZB	25	+11.7756	10	68
7	5	(Australia) Mark Winterbottom	Tickford Racing	Ford Falcon FG X	25	+16.8545	12	64
8	230	(Australia) Will Davison	23Red Racing	Ford Falcon FG X	25	+22.2170	19	60
9	6	(Australia) Cam Waters	Tickford Racing	Ford Falcon FG X	25	+26.7729	22	56
10	55	(Australia) Chaz Mostert	Tickford Racing	Ford Falcon FG X	25	+39.8085	6	52
11	21	(Australia) Tim Blanchard	Tim Blanchard Racing	Holden Commodore ZB	25	+42.4173	21	48
12	12	(New Zealand) Fabian Coulthard	DJR Team Penske	Ford Falcon FG X	25	+44.8334	7	46
13	97	(New Zealand) Shane van Gisbergen	Triple Eight Race Engineering	Holden Commodore ZB	25	+46.8289	17	44
14	9	(Australia) David Reynolds	Erebus Motorsport	Holden Commodore ZB	25	+48.0531	9	42
15	17	(New Zealand) Scott McLaughlin	DJR Team Penske	Ford Falcon FG X	25	+1:02.6140	1	40
16	23	(Australia) Michael Caruso	Nissan Motorsport	Nissan Altima L33	25	+1:04.9708	8	39
17	15	(Australia) Rick Kelly	Nissan Motorsport	Nissan Altima L33	25	+1:05.6160	16	36
18	35	(Australia) Todd Hazelwood	Matt Stone Racing	Ford Falcon FG X	25	+1:08.7765	26	34
19	18	(Australia) Lee Holdsworth	Team 18	Holden Commodore ZB	25	+1:11.1850	24	32
20	7	(New Zealand) Andre Heimgartner	Nissan Motorsport	Nissan Altima L33	25	+1:19.0088	15	30
21	99	(Australia) Anton de Pasquale	Erebus Motorsport	Holden Commodore ZB	25	+1:21.2410^{1}	13	28
22	19	(Australia) Jack Le Brocq	Tekno Autosports	Holden Commodore ZB	25	+1:21.3932	23	26
23	78	(Switzerland) Simona de Silvestro	Nissan Motorsport	Nissan Altima L33	25	+1:25.1738	18	24
24	34	(Australia) James Golding	Garry Rogers Motorsport	Holden Commodore ZB	25	+1:54.6767	20	22
25	56	(New Zealand) Richie Stanaway	Tickford Racing	Ford Falcon FG X	25	+1:55.6585	25	20
26	33	(Australia) Garth Tander	Garry Rogers Motorsport	Holden Commodore ZB	24	+1 lap	14	18
Fastest lap: James Courtney (Walkinshaw Andretti United) 1:56.6960 (on lap 16)

Notes

- ^1– Anton de Pasquale received a 5-second post-race Time Penalty for Careless Driving, failing to leave room and causing Rick Kelly lost 4 positions.

==== Championship standings after Race 5 ====
Drivers Championship

Pos	Driver	Pts	Gap
1	(New Zealand) Shane van Gisbergen	464	
2	(New Zealand) Scott McLaughlin	393	-71
3	(Australia) David Reynolds	387	-77
4	(Australia) Chaz Mostert	376	-88
5	(Australia) James Courtney	375	-89

Teams Championship

	Pos	Team	Pts	Gap
	1	Triple Eight Race Engineering (1, 97)	800	
2	2	Walkinshaw Andretti United	735	-65
	3	Tickford Racing (5, 55)	687	-113
2	4	DJR Team Penske	667	-133
1	5	Brad Jones Racing	602	-198

- Note: Only the top five positions are included for both sets of standings.

=== Race 6 ===
==== Qualifying ====
Pos.	No.	Driver	Team	Car	Time	Gap	Grid
1	1	(Australia) Jamie Whincup	Triple Eight Race Engineering	Holden Commodore ZB	1:55.4777		1
2	9	(Australia) David Reynolds	Erebus Motorsport	Holden Commodore ZB	1:55.5330	+0.0553	2
3	8	(Australia) Nick Percat	Brad Jones Racing	Holden Commodore ZB	1:55.5725	+0.0948	3
4	55	(Australia) Chaz Mostert	Tickford Racing	Ford Falcon FG X	1:55.5825	+0.1048	4
5	2	(Australia) Scott Pye	Walkinshaw Andretti United	Holden Commodore ZB	1:55.7679	+0.2902	5
6	12	(New Zealand) Fabian Coulthard	DJR Team Penske	Ford Falcon FG X	1:55.8967	+0.4968	6
7	23	(Australia) Michael Caruso	Nissan Motorsport	Nissan Altima L33	1:55.9745	+0.4968	7
8	230	(Australia) Will Davison	23Red Racing	Ford Falcon FG X	1:55.9877	+0.5100	8
9	17	(New Zealand) Scott McLaughlin	DJR Team Penske	Ford Falcon FG X	1:55.9927	+0.5150	9
10	99	(Australia) Anton de Pasquale	Erebus Motorsport	Holden Commodore ZB	1:55.9948	+0.5171	10
11	33	(Australia) Garth Tander	Garry Rogers Motorsport	Holden Commodore ZB	1:56.0082	+0.5305	11
12	888	(Australia) Craig Lowndes	Triple Eight Race Engineering	Holden Commodore ZB	1:56.1350	+0.6573	12
13	14	(Australia) Tim Slade	Brad Jones Racing	Holden Commodore ZB	1:56.1409	+0.6632	13
14	5	(Australia) Mark Winterbottom	Tickford Racing	Ford Falcon FG X	1:56.2174	+0.7397	14
15	6	(Australia) Cam Waters	Tickford Racing	Ford Falcon FG X	1:56.2405	+0.7628	15
16	7	(New Zealand) Andre Heimgartner	Nissan Motorsport	Nissan Altima L33	1:56.2950	+0.8173	16
17	15	(Australia) Rick Kelly	Nissan Motorsport	Nissan Altima L33	1:56.4759	+0.9982	17
18	19	(Australia) Jack Le Brocq	Tekno Autosports	Holden Commodore ZB	1:56.4871	+1.0094	18
19	78	(Switzerland) Simona de Silvestro	Nissan Motorsport	Nissan Altima L33	1:56.8815	+1.4038	19
20	56	(New Zealand) Richie Stanaway	Tickford Racing	Ford Falcon FG X	1:57.0245	+1.5468	20
21	21	(Australia) Tim Blanchard	Tim Blanchard Racing	Holden Commodore ZB	1:57.2643	+1.7866	21
22	35	(Australia) Todd Hazelwood	Matt Stone Racing	Ford Falcon FG X	1:57.3489	+1.8712	22
23	34	(Australia) James Golding	Garry Rogers Motorsport	Holden Commodore ZB	1:57.6624	+2.1847	23
24	18	(Australia) Lee Holdsworth	Team 18	Holden Commodore ZB	1:58.4218	+2.9441	24
25	25	(Australia) James Courtney	Walkinshaw Andretti United	Holden Commodore ZB	2:15.2033	+19.7256	25^{1}
26	97	(New Zealand) Shane van Gisbergen	Triple Eight Race Engineering	Holden Commodore ZB	No time	–	26^{1}

Notes

- ^1– James Courtney and Shane van Gisbergen, although their best time exceeded the specified qualifying time cut-off, the Stewards gave them permission to race.

==== Race ====
Pos	No.	Driver	Team	Car	Laps	Time / Retired	Grid	Points
1	9	(Australia) David Reynolds	Erebus Motorsport	Holden Commodore ZB	11	25:58.6766	2	50
2	8	(Australia) Nick Percat	Brad Jones Racing	Holden Commodore ZB	11	+1.0080	3	46
3	1	(Australia) Jamie Whincup	Triple Eight Race Engineering	Holden Commodore ZB	11	+1.9105	1	43
4	55	(Australia) Chaz Mostert	Tickford Racing	Ford Falcon FG X	11	+2.9224	4	40
5	2	(Australia) Scott Pye	Walkinshaw Andretti United	Holden Commodore ZB	11	+3.5400	5	37
6	12	(New Zealand) Fabian Coulthard	DJR Team Penske	Ford Falcon FG X	11	+4.2630	6	34
7	17	(New Zealand) Scott McLaughlin	DJR Team Penske	Ford Falcon FG X	11	+4.7582	9	32
8	23	(Australia) Michael Caruso	Nissan Motorsport	Nissan Altima L33	11	+5.1488	7	30
9	33	(Australia) Garth Tander	Garry Rogers Motorsport	Holden Commodore ZB	11	+5.4902	11	28
10	230	(Australia) Will Davison	23Red Racing	Ford Falcon FG X	11	+5.8493	8	26
11	14	(Australia) Tim Slade	Brad Jones Racing	Holden Commodore ZB	11	+6.3192	13	24
12	888	(Australia) Craig Lowndes	Triple Eight Race Engineering	Holden Commodore ZB	11	+6.6645	12	23
13	97	(New Zealand) Shane van Gisbergen	Triple Eight Race Engineering	Holden Commodore ZB	11	+6.9848	26	22
14	7	(New Zealand) Andre Heimgartner	Nissan Motorsport	Nissan Altima L33	11	+7.4466	16	21
15	99	(Australia) Anton de Pasquale	Erebus Motorsport	Holden Commodore ZB	11	+8.4857	10	20
16	78	(Switzerland) Simona de Silvestro	Nissan Motorsport	Nissan Altima L33	11	+9.6732	19	19
17	5	(Australia) Mark Winterbottom	Tickford Racing	Ford Falcon FG X	11	+9.7407	14	18
18	56	(New Zealand) Richie Stanaway	Tickford Racing	Ford Falcon FG X	11	+10.6478	20	17
19	35	(Australia) Todd Hazelwood	Matt Stone Racing	Ford Falcon FG X	11	+11.4744	22	16
20	21	(Australia) Tim Blanchard	Tim Blanchard Racing	Holden Commodore ZB	11	+11.4816	21	15
21	19	(Australia) Jack Le Brocq	Tekno Autosports	Holden Commodore ZB	11	+12.1438	18	14
22	6	(Australia) Cam Waters	Tickford Racing	Ford Falcon FG X	11	+15.5830^{1}	15	13
23	18	(Australia) Lee Holdsworth	Team 18	Holden Commodore ZB	9	+2 laps^{2}	24	12
NC	34	(Australia) James Golding	Garry Rogers Motorsport	Holden Commodore ZB	7	Fire	23	
NC	25	(Australia) James Courtney	Walkinshaw Andretti United	Holden Commodore ZB	1	Collision	25	
NC	15	(Australia) Rick Kelly	Nissan Motorsport	Nissan Altima L33	1	Collision	17	
Fastest lap: Chaz Mostert (Tickford Racing) 1:57.1082 (on lap 2)

Notes

- ^1– Cam Waters received a 5-second Time Penalty for Careless Driving, causing contact with Anton de Pasquale.
- ^2– Lee Holdsworth received a Pit-Lane Penalty equivalent Time Penalty (40 seconds) for a breach of the Safety Car Restart procedures.

==== Championship standings after Race 6 ====
Drivers Championship

	Pos	Driver	Pts	Gap
	1	(New Zealand) Shane van Gisbergen	486	
1	2	(Australia) David Reynolds	437	-49
1	3	(New Zealand) Scott McLaughlin	425	-61
	4	(Australia) Chaz Mostert	416	-70
1	5	(Australia) Scott Pye	397	-89

Teams Championship

Pos	Team	Pts	Gap
1	Triple Eight Race Engineering (1, 97)	865	
2	Walkinshaw Andretti United	772	-93
3	Tickford Racing (5, 55)	745	-120
4	DJR Team Penske	733	-132
5	Brad Jones Racing	672	-193

- Note: Only the top five positions are included for both sets of standings.
