= Erebus Motorsport =

Australian motor racing team

- Manufacturer: Chevrolet
- Owner: Betty Klimenko
- Team Principal: Brad Tremain
- Race Drivers: 9. Jobe Stewart; 99. Jarrod Hughes
- Race Engineers: 9. Daniel Frenchman; 99. Wayne Mackie
- Data Engineers: Aidan Graham
- Chassis: Chevrolet Camaro ZL1
- Debut: 2013
- Drivers' Championships: 1 (2023)
- Teams' Championships: 1 (2023)
- Race wins: 20
- 2025 position: 25
- 9th (2457 pts)

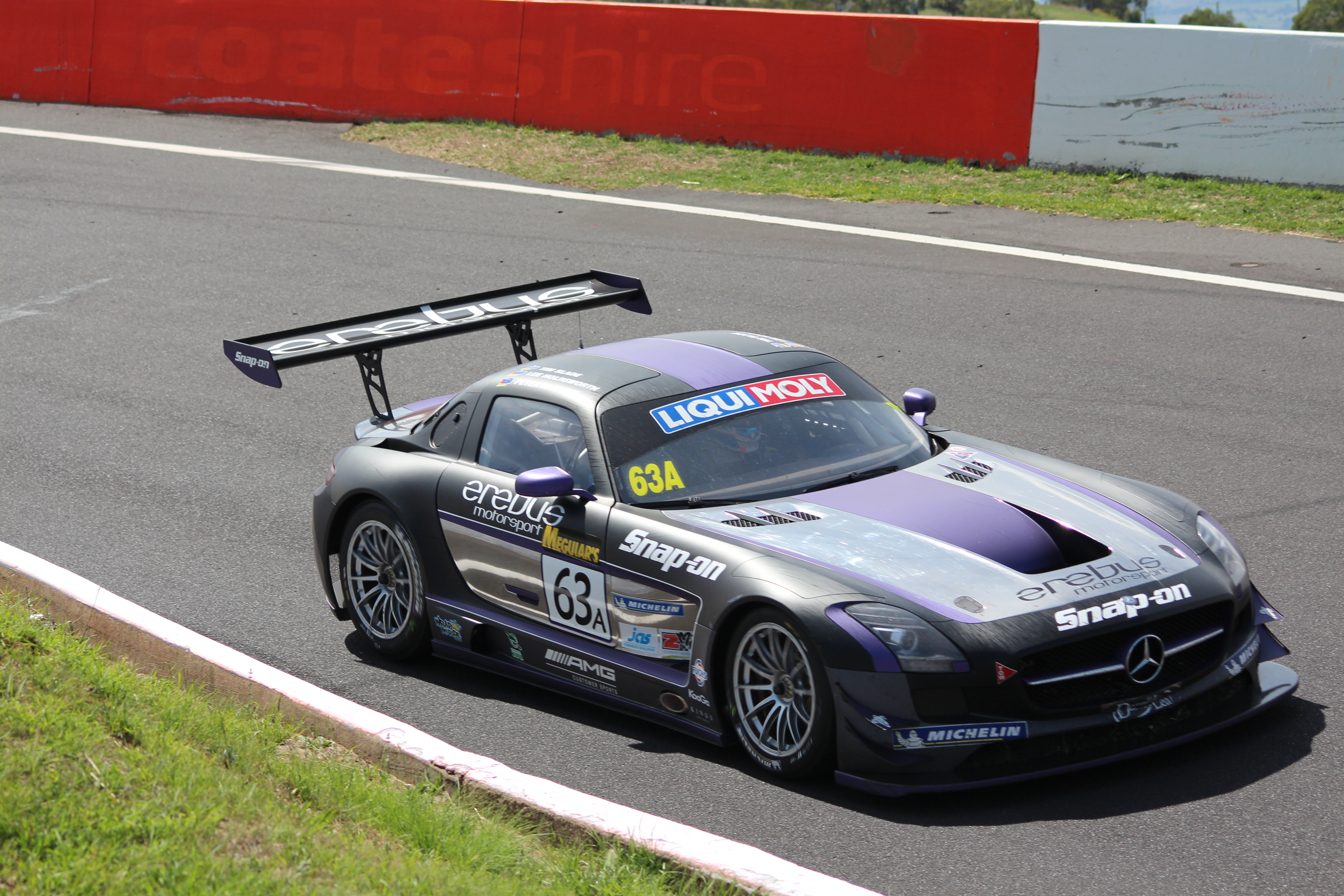
The Erebus run Mercedes-Benz SLS AMG GT3 driven by Peter Hackett, Lee Holdsworth and Tim Slade.

Erebus Motorsport (formerly known as Erebus Racing) is an Australian motor racing team. The team competes in the Supercars Championship with two Chevrolet Camaro ZL1s. The team's current drivers are Jobe Stewart and Jarrod Hughes.

The team is owned by Betty Klimenko and is based in Melbourne. The team launched as a GT racing team in 2011 with the team joining Supercars in 2013 following the purchase of Stone Brothers Racing. The team is best known for winning the 2017 Bathurst 1000 with David Reynolds and Luke Youlden, and also won the 2013 Bathurst 12 Hour.

== Racing history ==
=== GT ===
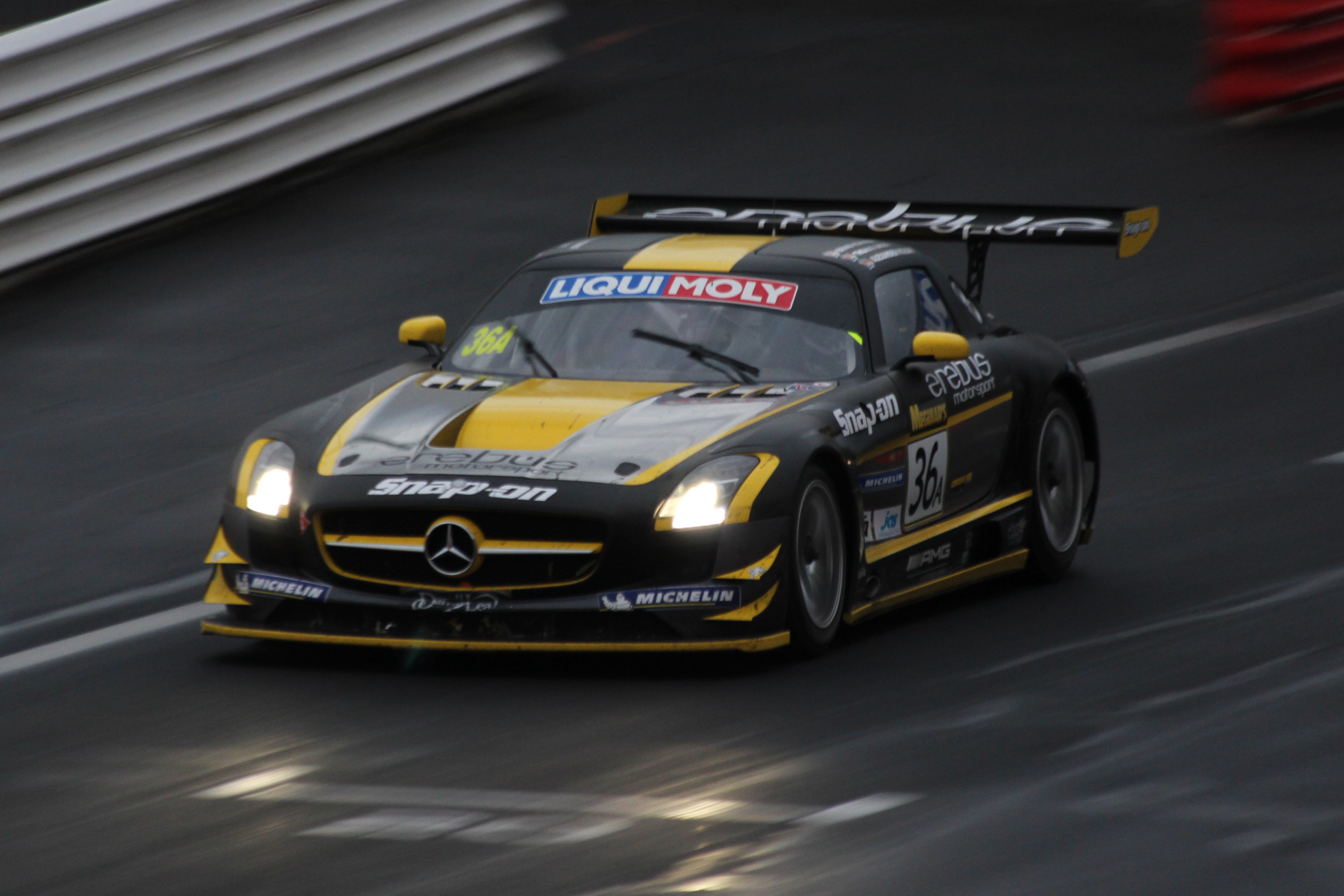
A Mercedes-Benz SLS AMG prepared by Erebus Motorsport and driven by Thomas Jäger, Alexander Roloff and Bernd Schneider to victory in the 2013 Bathurst 12 Hour

The team, then known as Erebus Racing, formed in 2011 when the team's first Mercedes SLS AMG GT3 car arrived from Europe. In the 2011 Australian GT Championship season, early season problems, coupled with the car not being ready until Round 3, limited driver Peter Hackett's championship run and he finished fourth. He did claim race wins at Phillip Island and at Mount Panorama along the way. Early 2012 provided the teams highlight to date, with second place in the 2012 Armor All Bathurst 12 Hour with V8 Supercar driver Tim Slade and European GT racers Jeroen Bleekemolen and Bret Curtis co-driving with Hackett.

The team expanded to a second car for the 2012 Australian GT Championship season with former V8 Utes and Nations Cup GT racer James Brock (the son of the late nine-time Bathurst 1000 winner Peter Brock) added as the second driver. After a crash in the opening round at the Clipsal 500 which put Hackett behind, he quickly got himself into the lead of the Championship. He led from round four through to the final round at Homebush, where he crashed in the opening race. He would go on to finish the championship in second place behind Klark Quinn.

Brock started the season strongly with a podium in Adelaide. A heavy crash at Phillip Island slid him down the order. After re-building the #62 from scratch, he suffered another crash at Sydney Motorsport Park, resulting in another write-off. For the remaining three events of the season, Brock was replaced by a group of European-based AMG Customer Sports factory drivers. Maro Engel. was the first, winning the round at Phillip Island, before FIA GT1 World Team Champion, Thomas Jäger joined the team. At the final round in Homebush, five times DTM Champion, Bernd Schneider joined the team and comprehensively dominated the weekend.

In February 2013, the team entered the Liqui-Moly Bathurst 12 Hour with its two Mercedes SLS AMG GT3s. #36 was piloted by Bernd Schneider, Thomas Jäger and Alex Roloff, while car #63 was piloted by regular driver Peter Hackett and V8 Supercars drivers Lee Holdsworth and Tim Slade. It was car #63 that would take pole position on the Saturday, with Lee Holdsworth behind the wheel, with a 2.06.22, but could only finish the race in 6th position, five laps behind the race winners after an incident late in the race whilst leading. This left the #36 machine to take the team's first Bathurst 12 Hour victory and added this race to the Dubai 24 Hour victory for Schneider and the AMG Customer Sports program. They ended the dramatic race with a lead well over a lap on the second and third placed cars. Roloff had the honour to take the chequered flag surviving the mixed conditions without radio contact to the team. The team struggled in that year's Australian GT season, with Jack Le Brocq only managing ninth in the points.

In 2014, the team finished third in the Bathurst 12 Hour, with Greg Crick, Will Davison and Jack Le Brocq behind the wheel. Their other entry, driven by Maro Engel, set pole position and in doing so won the first Allan Simonsen Pole Position Trophy. In the 2014 Australian GT Championship, Erebus won the title with Richard Muscat driving.

In the 2015 Liqui Moly Bathurst 12 Hour, the team's leading entry was the Dean Canto, Le Brocq and Muscat SLS AMG, which finished in fifth position. In the 2016 Liqui Moly Bathurst 12 Hour, the team's leading entry was the Thomas Jäger, Nico Bastian and V8 Supercar driver David Reynolds SLS AMG, which finished in fifth position, A second SLS AMG was entered for Bernd Schneider, Maro Engel and Austin Cindric, however the car did not finish after Cindric hit the wall at the end of Mountain Straight.

After a period of scaling back of GT activities, the team prepared an entry at the 2019 Bathurst 12 Hour which included their Bathurst 1000 winning combination of David Reynolds and Luke Youlden alongside Yasser Shahin.

=== Supercars Championship ===
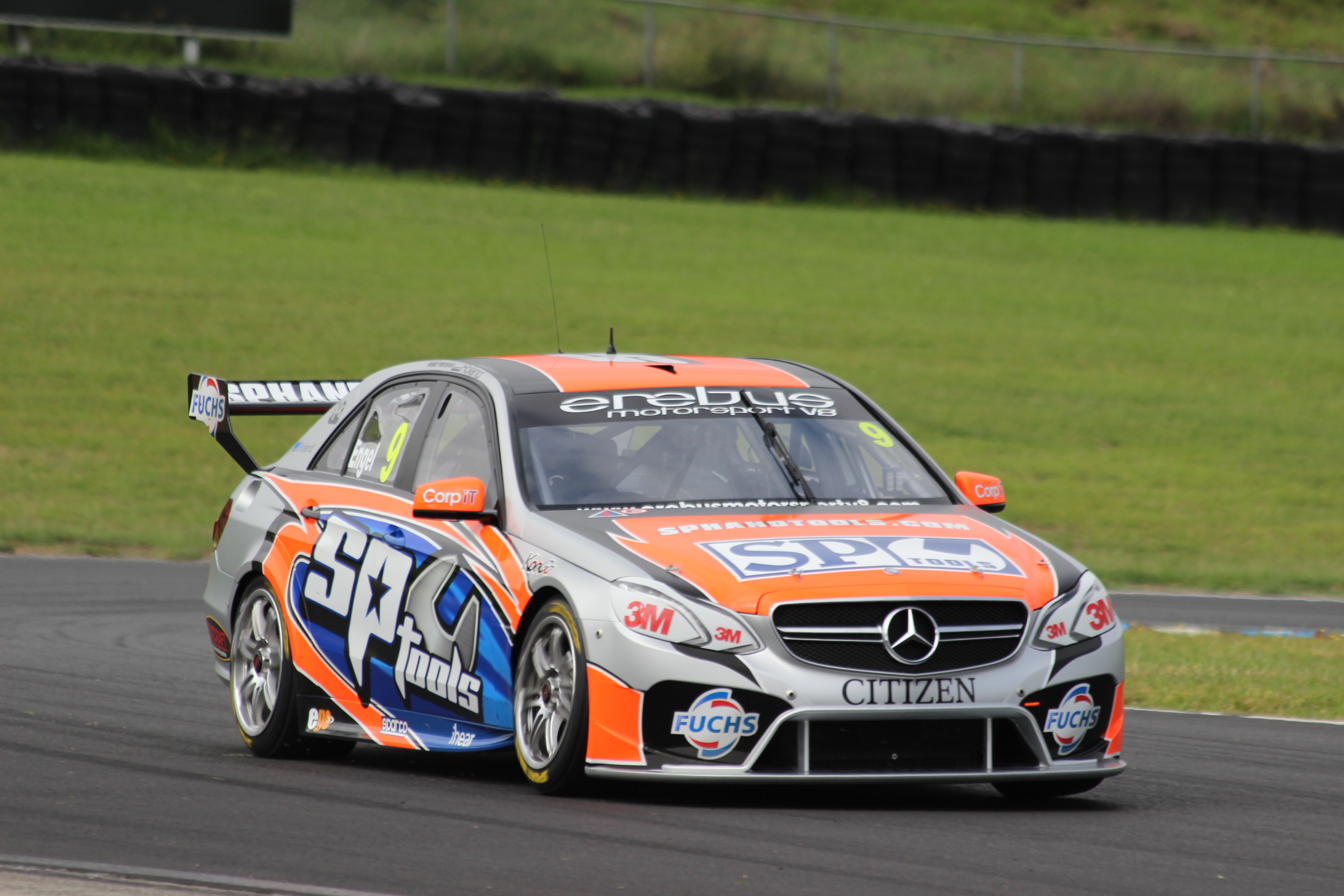
The Mercedes-Benz E63 AMG of Maro Engel at the Sydney Motorsport Park test day in 2013

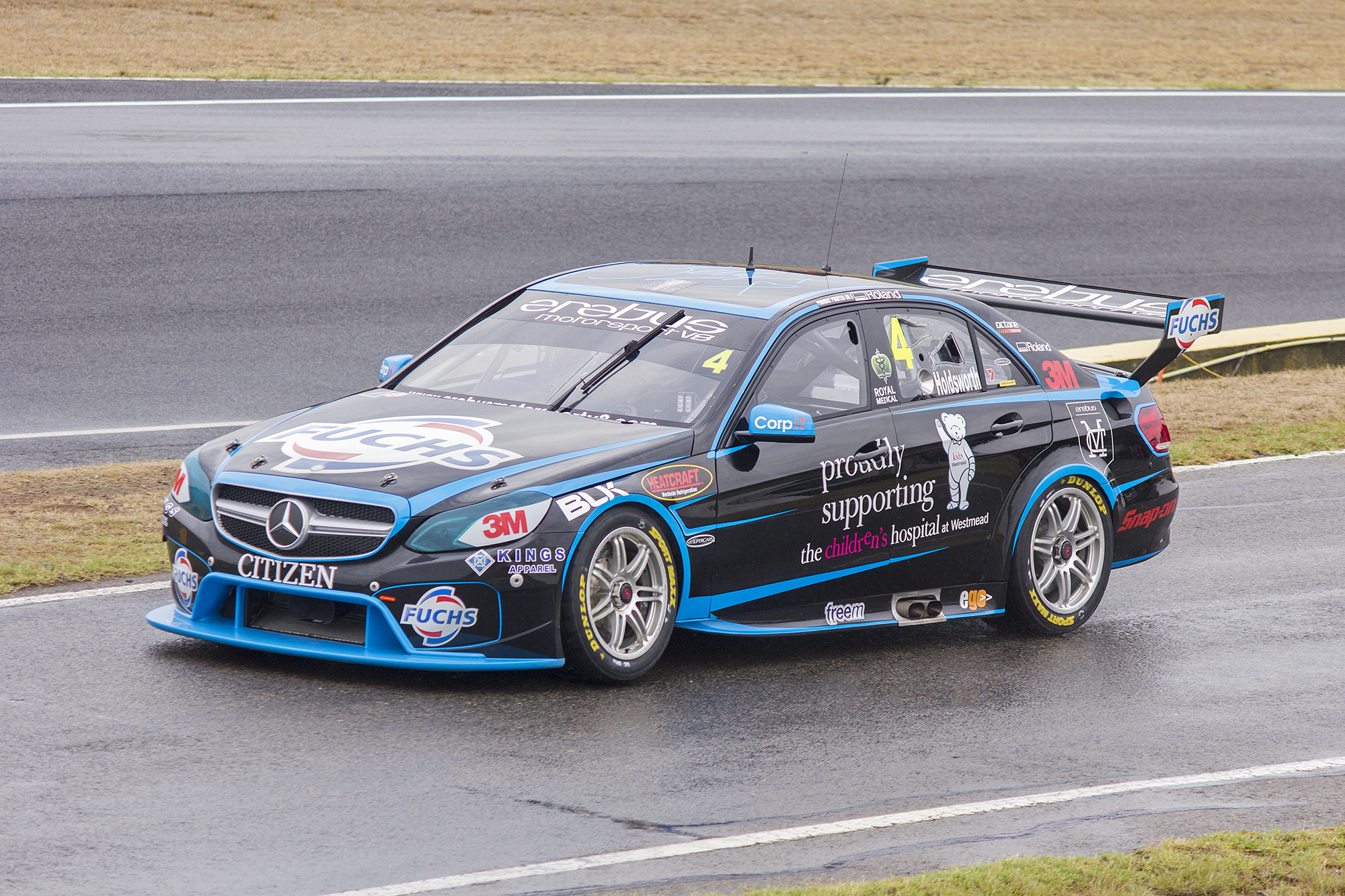
Mercedes-Benz E63 W212 of Lee Holdsworth at the Sydney Motorsport Park test day in 2014

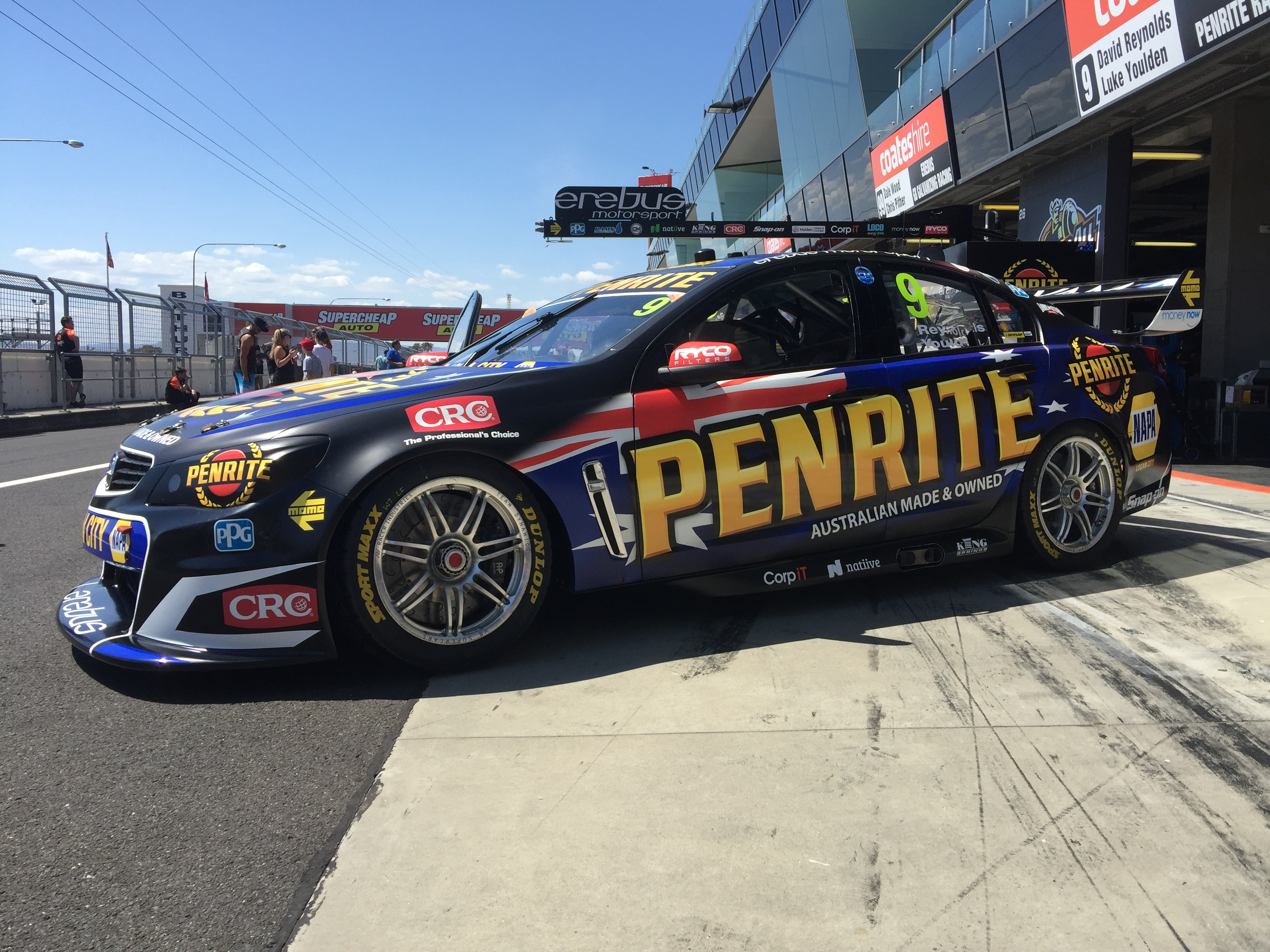
2017 Bathurst 1000 winning Holden VF Commodore

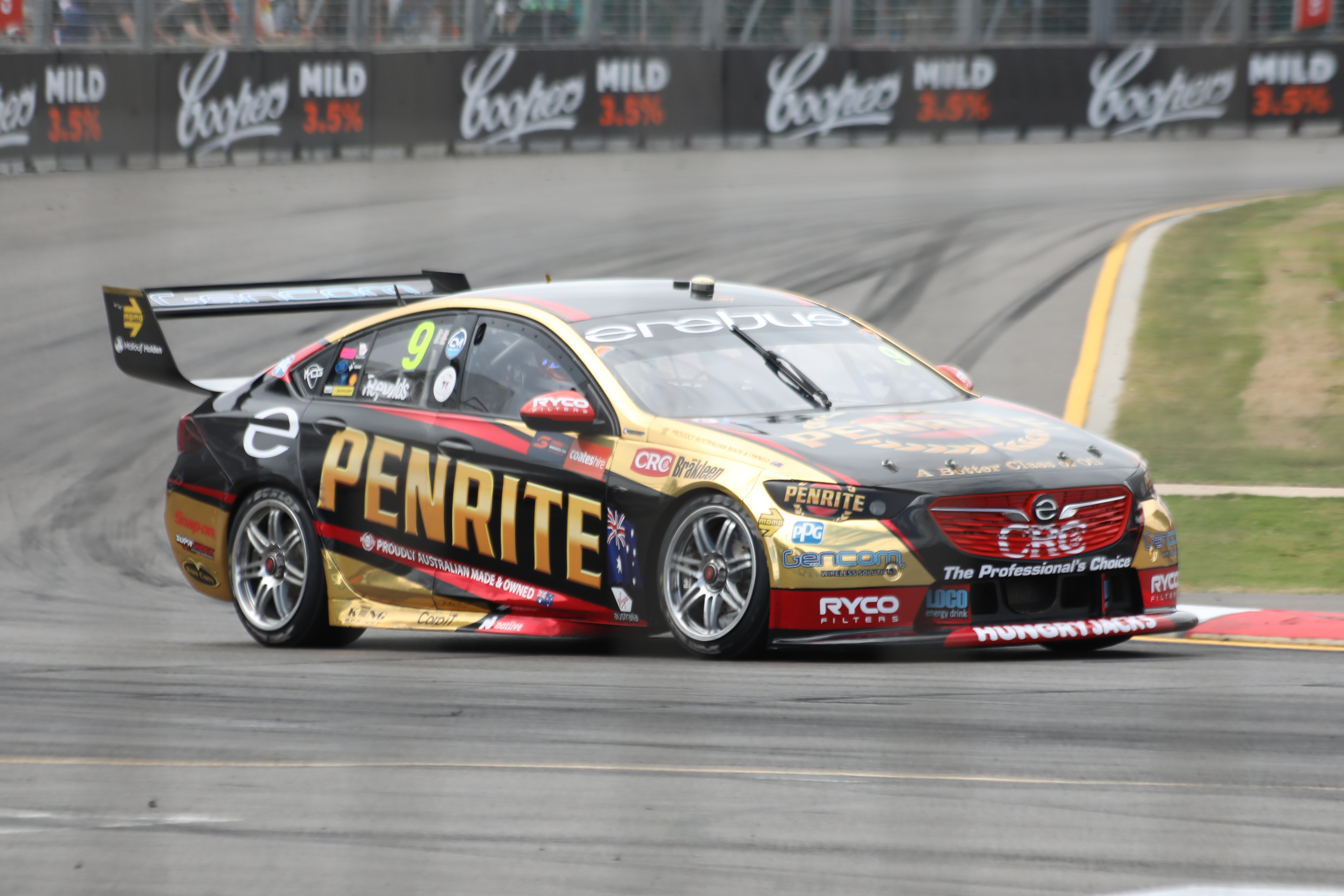
The Holden ZB Commodore of David Reynolds at the 2018 Newcastle 500

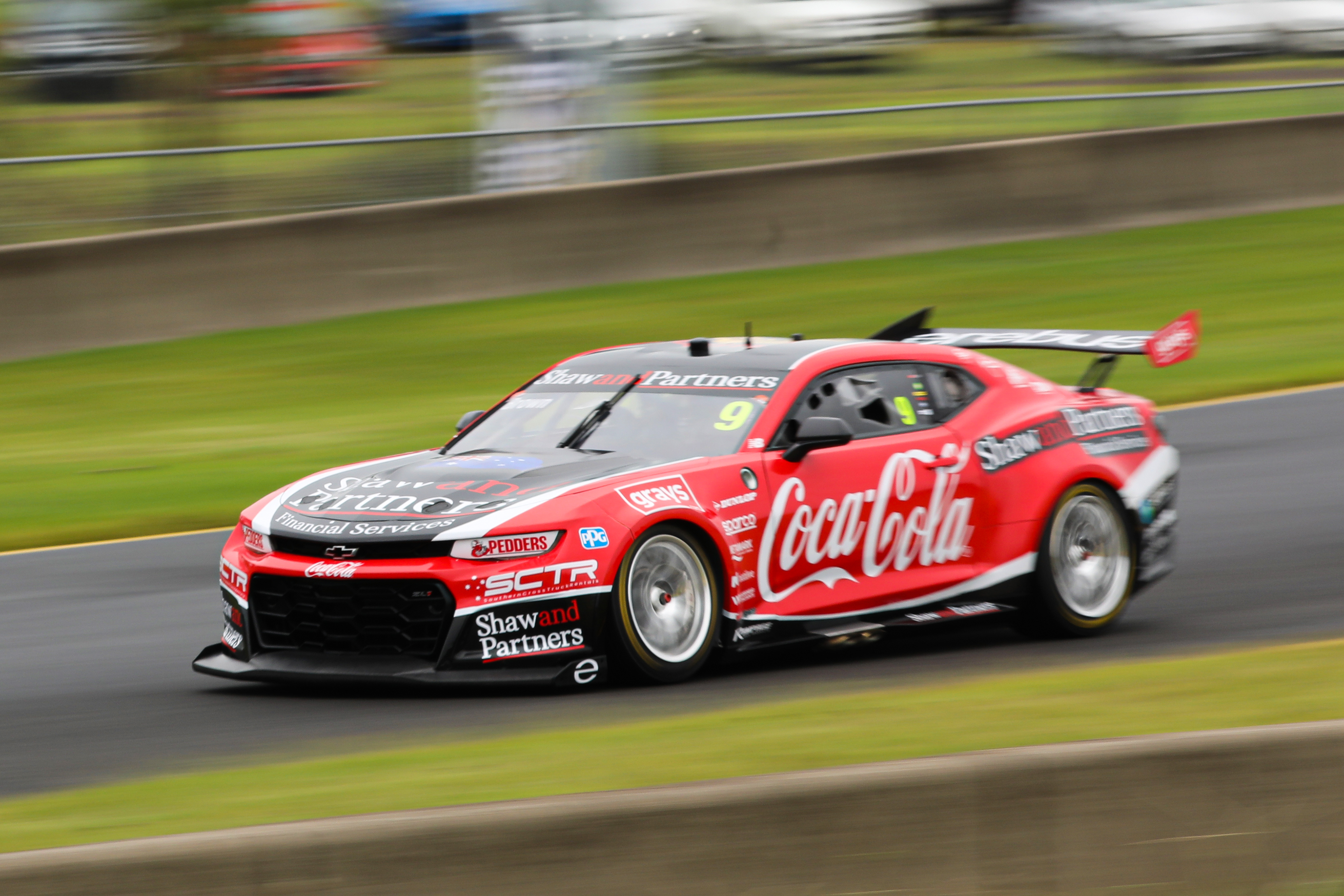
The Chevrolet Camaro ZL1 of Will Brown at the Sydney Motorsport Park test day in 2023

In September 2012, Erebus Motorsport announced it was in the process of purchasing Stone Brothers Racing and would enter the 2013 International V8 Supercars Championship, competing with three Mercedes-Benz E63 AMGs entered under the category's new "Car of the Future" regulations. The sale was finalised in January 2013, with the team purchasing one Racing Entitlement Contract (REC) and leasing a second from the Stone Brothers, whilst operating a third car on behalf of satellite team James Rosenberg Racing. With Shane van Gisbergen leaving the team at the end of the 2012 season, Erebus recruited former DTM driver Maro Engel as his replacement, whilst retaining Lee Holdsworth and Tim Slade in the other two cars.

For 2014, the team scaled back to a two-car operation with the James Rosenberg Racing REC and Tim Slade both moving to Walkinshaw Racing. Will Davison replaced Maro Engel. Lee Holdsworth scored the team's first race win at Winton in April 2014.

In 2015, Ashley Walsh replaced Lee Holdsworth as the driver for Car #4. Will Davison secured the team's second V8 Supercar race win at the 2015 Ubet Perth Super Sprint at Barbagallo Raceway.

The team operated from the team from the former Stone Brothers Racing premises in Yatala on the Gold Coast until the end of the 2015 season, when it moved its V8 Supercars and GT operations under one roof in Moorabbin, Melbourne. This was replaced by a new facility in Dandenong in mid-2016 after its previous facility became too small.

David Reynolds replaced Will Davison for the 2016 Championship, with Davison moving to Tekno Autosports. Reynolds was joined by Aaren Russell with the team switching from running the E63 AMGs to a pair of Holden Commodore VFs. Russell split with the team after the Townsville 400 round, and was replaced by Craig Baird for Ipswich. Shae Davies raced the teams #4 Entry for the remainder of the 2016 Season.

For 2017, Reynolds remained with the team, while Dale Wood replaced Davies as the driver of the newly renumbered #99 Entry. Reynolds, partnered with Luke Youlden, won the rain-affected 2017 Supercheap Auto Bathurst 1000, while the second car of Wood - partnered by Chris Pither - finished a season-best 4th. In October 2017, Wood announced that he would no longer be continuing his full-time drive with the team into 2018. His replacement will be 2017 Dunlop Super2 Series competitor, Anton de Pasquale. In 2018, Reynolds won three races and finished fifth in the championship with de Pasquale 20th in his debut year.

In 2019, Penrite, a sponsor of the team since 2015, increased its sponsorship to both cars and took over title sponsorship of the team. Reynolds finished sixth in the championship and de Pasquale 14th.

In 2021, Will Brown and Brodie Kostecki replaced Reynolds and De Pasquale. Also Boost Mobile partnered with Erebus Motorsport for naming rights branding on the #99 Car of Kostecki for a full season in the Championship. This led to a full naming rights sponsorship in 2022, where Boost Mobile became naming rights sponsor of the entire team including Will Brown's #9 car. The team was known as Boost Mobile Racing by Erebus. A Wild Card entry to Bathurst was also announced for 2021, dragging out Greg Murphy from retirement, With Richie Stanaway to partner him. Greg Murphy is a long time friend of Boost Mobile founder Peter Adderton. This did not go ahead in 2021 due to COVID-19 restrictions but went ahead in 2022, Stanaway and Murphy finished 11th, after starting 4th.

In December 2022, Coca-Cola Europacific Partners purchased the naming rights sponsorship, with the team renamed as Coca-Cola Racing by Erebus for the 2023 and 2024 seasons. Will Brown and Brodie Kostecki remained with the team. The team also swapped to running the Chevrolet Camaro ZL1 as the championship moved to the Gen 3 Regulations.

In 2023, Brodie Kostecki won the Driver's Championship with Erebus, as well as the team winning the Team's championship. Brown left at the end of 2023 for Red Bull Ampol Racing, and was replaced by Jack Le Brocq.

In early February 2024, just weeks before the season opening Bathurst 500, Series champion Brodie Kostecki parted ways with the team after rumours swirled about how Kostecki was being treated by the team internally. Further, naming rights sponsor Coca-Cola, as well as Shaw and Partners, and SCTR withdrew their financial support of the team. Kostecki was replaced by Todd Hazelwood at the 2024 season opening round, thus reuniting with former Matt Stone Racing teammate Jack Le Brocq. On April 7, 2024, it was announced that Kostecki would rejoin the team at the Taupo round, and Hazelwood, who also drove in the Melbourne round, would revert to his role as an endurance co-driver.

=== Other ===
Guy Stewart formerly drove the team's Aurion-Yamaha in the Aussie Racing Cars series, and the team was also involved in a V8 Utes team with Adam Marjoram driving. The team formerly ran a Mygale F3 car labelled Erebus Academy, racing in Australian Formula 3 with Jack Le Brocq driving. Members of the Erebus Academy development program have included Le Brocq, Adam Marjoram and Richard Muscat.

On October 2, 2023, the team announced that they had plans to compete in select races with Kostecki in the NASCAR Cup Series in a partnership with Richard Childress Racing in 2024. The partnership will work the other way, with 2025 NASCAR Xfinity Series finalist Jesse Love driving for Image Racing, which organises Erebus' Super2 operations, at the Super2 BP Adelaide Grand Final.

== Supercars Championship drivers ==
The following is a list of drivers who have driven for the team in the Supercars Championship, in order of their first appearance. Drivers who only drove for the team on a part-time basis are listed in italics.

- (Australia) Lee Holdsworth (2013–14)
- (Australia) Tim Slade (2013)
- (Germany) Maro Engel (2013)
- (New Zealand) Craig Baird (2013–14, 2016)
- (Australia) Andrew Thompson (2013)
- (Australia) Steven Johnson (2013)
- (Australia) David Brabham (2013)
- (Australia) Will Davison (2014–15)
- (Australia) Alex Davison (2014–15)
- (Australia) Ashley Walsh (2015)
- (Australia) Jack Le Brocq (2015, 2024–2025)
- (Australia) Dean Canto (2015)
- (Australia) Aaren Russell (2016)
- (Australia) David Reynolds (2016–20)
- (Australia) Shae Davies (2016)
- (New Zealand) Chris van der Drift (2016)
- (Australia) Dale Wood (2017)
- (New Zealand) Chris Pither (2017)
- (Australia) Luke Youlden (2017–19)
- (Australia) Anton de Pasquale (2018–20)
- (Australia) Will Brown (2018–2023)
- (Australia) Brodie Kostecki (2020–2024)
- (Australia) Jack Perkins (2021–2023)
- (Australia) David Russell (2021–2023)
- (New Zealand) Greg Murphy (2022)
- (New Zealand) Richie Stanaway (2022)
- (Australia) Todd Hazelwood (2024)
- (Australia) Jayden Ojeda (2024)
- (Australia) Cooper Murray (2024–2026)
- (Australia) Jarrod Hughes (2025–present)
- (Australia) Jobe Stewart (2025–present)
- (Australia) Lachlan Dalton (2026–present)

== Super2 drivers ==
The following is a list of drivers who have driven for the team in Super2 Series, in order of their first appearance. Drivers who only drove for the team on a part-time basis are listed in italics.

- (Australia) Jack Perkins (2023)
- (Australia) Jordan Boys (2023)
- (Australia) Jobe Stewart (2024–2025)

== Racing results ==
=== Car No. 9 results ===
Year	Driver	No.	Make	1	2	3	4	5	6	7	8	9	10	11	12	13	14	15	16	17	18	19	20	21	22	23	24	25	26	27	28	29	30	31	32	33	34	35	36	37	38	39	40	Position	Pts
2013	Maro Engel	9	Mercedes-Benz E63 AMG	ADE; R1; 24	ADE; R2; Ret	SYM; R3; Ret	SYM; R4; 24	SYM; R5; 23	PUK; R6; 24	PUK; R7; 21	PUK; R8; 20	PUK; R9; 21	BAR; R10; 25	BAR; R11; 26	BAR; R12; Ret	COA; R13; 23	COA; R14; Ret	COA; R15; 24	COA; R16; 25	HID; R17; 16	HID; R18; 22	HID; R19; 9	TOW; R20; 19	TOW; R21; 27	QLD; R22; 19	QLD; R23; 27	QLD; R24; 17	WIN; R25; 18	WIN; R26; 17	WIN; R27; 19	SAN; R28; 25	BAT; R29; 20	SUR; R30; 21	SUR; R31; 22	PHI; R32; 21	PHI; R33; 22	PHI; R34; 19	SYD; R35; Ret	SYD; R36; 20					28th	836
2014	Will Davison	9	Mercedes-Benz E63 AMG	ADE; R1; 13	ADE; R2; 10	ADE; R3; Ret	SYM; R4; 7	SYM; R5; 23	SYM; R6; 4	WIN; R7; 6	WIN; R8; 8	WIN; R9; 18	PUK; R10; 5	PUK; R11; 18	PUK; R12; 18	PUK; R13; 7	BAR; R14; 7	BAR; R15; 18	BAR; R16; 24	HID; R17; Ret	HID; R18; 13	HID; R19; 16	TOW; R20; 3	TOW; R21; 16	TOW; R22; 10	QLD; R23; 7	QLD; R24; 14	QLD; R25; 18	SMP; R26; 7	SMP; R27; 5	SMP; R28; 11	SAN; QR; 18	SAN; R29; 21	BAT; R30; 4	SUR; R31; 20	SUR; R32; 20	PHI; R33; 11	PHI; R34; 14	PHI; R35; 6	SYD; R36; Ret	SYD; R37; 13	SYD; R38; 10		14th	1912
2015	Will Davison	9	Mercedes-Benz E63 AMG	ADE; R1; Ret	ADE; R2; DNS	ADE; R3; 19	SYM; R4; 17	SYM; R5; 7	SYM; R6; 23	BAR; R7; 7	BAR; R8; 9	BAR; R9; 1	WIN; R10; 13	WIN; R11; 7	WIN; R12; 24	HID; R13; 14	HID; R14; 19	HID; R15; 24	TOW; R16; 12	TOW; R17; 24	QLD; R18; 9	QLD; R19; 7	QLD; R20; 7	SMP; R21; 13	SMP; R22; 9	SMP; R23; 20	SAN; R24; 23	BAT; R25; 12	SUR; R26; 15	SUR; R27; 16	PUK; R28; Ret	PUK; R29; 13	PUK; R30; 16	PHI; R31; 15	PHI; R32; 17	PHI; R33; 12	SYD; R34; 13	SYD; R35; 11	SYD; R36; 18					15th	1672
2016	David Reynolds	9	Holden	ADE; R1; 14	ADE; R2; 19	ADE; R3; 5	SYM; R4; 16	SYM; R5; 18	PHI; R6; 12	PHI; R7; 14	BAR; R8; 19	BAR; R9; 21	WIN; R10; 22	WIN; R11; 6	HID; R12; 17	HID; R13; 9	TOW; R14; 11	TOW; R15; 14	QLD; R16; 21	QLD; R17; 23	SMP; R18; 17	SMP; R19; 19	SAN; QR; 17	SAN; R20; DSQ	BAT; R21; 18	SUR; R22; Ret	SUR; R23; 20	PUK; R24; 13	PUK; R25; 8	PUK; R26; 17	PUK; R27; 25	SYD; R28; 10	SYD; R29; 3											16th	1564
2017	David Reynolds	9	Holden	ADE; R1; 4	ADE; R2; 12	SYM; R3; 4	SYM; R4; 5	PHI; R5; Ret	PHI; R6; 3	BAR; R7; 9	BAR; R8; 16	WIN; R9; 4	WIN; R10; 7	HID; R11; 8	HID; R12; 7	TOW; R13; 9	TOW; R14; 11	QLD; R15; 10	QLD; R16; 9	SMP; R17; 8	SMP; R18; 9	SAN; QR; 17	SAN; R19; 17	BAT; R20; 1	SUR; R21; 17	SUR; R22; Ret	PUK; R23; 24	PUK; R24; 13	NEW; R25; 5	NEW; R26; 3														7th	2196
2018	David Reynolds	9	Holden	ADE; R1; 4	ADE; R2; 2	MEL; R3; 7	MEL; R4; 12	MEL; R5; 14	MEL; R6; 1	SYM; R7; 4	SYM; R8; 8	PHI; R9; 6	PHI; R10; 2	BAR; R11; 17	BAR; R12; 2	WIN; R13; 25	WIN; R14; 15	HID; R15; 3	HID; R16; 1	TOW; R17; 7	TOW; R18; 6	QLD; R19; 7	QLD; R20; 7	SMP; R21; 7	BEN; R22; 17	BEN; R23; 3	SAN; QR; 1	SAN; R24; 5	BAT; R25; 13	SUR; R26; 4	SUR; R27; C	PUK; R28; 4	PUK; R29; 5	NEW; R30; 2	NEW; R31; 1									5th	3206
2019	David Reynolds	9	Holden	ADE; R1; 8	ADE; R2; 9	MEL; R3; 10	MEL; R4; 7	MEL; R5; 4	MEL; R6; 8	SYM; R7; 6	SYM; R8; 3	PHI; R9; 4	PHI; R10; 11	BAR; R11; 10	BAR; R12; 6	WIN; R13; 3	WIN; R14; 4	HID; R15; 3	HID; R16; 2	TOW; R17; 6	TOW; R18; 20	QLD; R19; 9	QLD; R20; 21	BEN; R21; 7	BEN; R22; 13	PUK; R23; 3	PUK; R24; 24	BAT; R25; 5	SUR; R26; 22	SUR; R27; 3	SAN; QR; 3	SAN; R28; Ret	NEW; R29; 4	NEW; R30; 16										6th	2694
2020	David Reynolds	9	Holden	ADE; R1; 4	ADE; R2; 8	MEL; R3; C	MEL; R4; C	MEL; R5; C	MEL; R6; C	SMP; R7; 21	SMP; R8; 5	SMP; R9; 4	SMP2; R10; 14	SMP2; R11; 11	SMP2; R12; 4	HID1; R13; 13	HID1; R14; 5	HID1; R15; 9	HID2; R16; 12	HID2; R17; 16	HID2; R18; 10	TOW1; R19; 5	TOW1; R20; 10	TOW1; R21; 11	TOW2; R22; Ret	TOW2; R23; 15	TOW2; R24; 11	BEN1; R25; 13	BEN1; R26; 7	BEN1; R27; 9	BEN2; R28; 16	BEN2; R29; Ret	BEN2; R30; 17	BAT; R31; 15										12th	1492
2021	Will Brown	9	Holden	BAT; R1; 16	BAT; R2; 14	SAN; R3; 16	SAN; R4; 16	SAN; R5; 7	SYM; R6; 9	SYM; R7; 5	SYM; R8; 15	BEN; R9; 11	BEN; R10; 13	BEN; R11; 24	HID; R12; 4	HID; R13; 8	HID; R14; 10	TOW; R15; 18	TOW; R16; 5	TOW2; R17; 10	TOW2; R18; Ret	TOW2; R19; 12	SYD1; R20; 5	SYD1; R21; 11	SYD1; R22; 2	SYD2; R23; 11	SYD2; R24; 6	SYD2; R25; 6	SYD3; R26; 3	SYD3; R27; 8	SYD3; R28; 1	SYD4; R29; 7	SYD4; R30; C	BAT; R31; 20										8th	1838
2022	Will Brown	9	Holden	SMP; R1; 7	SMP; R2; 8	SYM; R3; 13	SYM; R4; 12	SYM; R5; 15	MEL; R6; 17	MEL; R7; 23	MEL; R8; 24	MEL; R9; 8	BAR; R10; 17	BAR; R11; Ret	BAR; R12; 5	WIN; R13; 27	WIN; R14; 6	WIN; R15; 5	HID; R16; Ret	HID; R17; 20	HID; R18; 7	TOW; R19; 11	TOW; R20; 19	BEN; R21; 20	BEN; R22; 7	BEN; R23; 6	SAN; R24; 4	SAN; R25; 3	SAN; R26; 11	PUK; R27; 19	PUK; R28; Ret	PUK; R29; DNS	BAT; R30; 10	SUR; R31; 24	SUR; R32; 11	ADE; R33; 22	ADE; R34; 6							14th	1714
2023	Will Brown	9	Chevrolet	NEW; R1; 4	NEW; R2; 13	MEL; R3; 3	MEL; R4; 6	MEL; R5; 3	MEL; R6; 23	BAR; R7; 16	BAR; R8; 1	BAR; R9; 2	SYM; R10; 1	SYM; R11; 3	SYM; R12; 1	HID; R13; 7	HID; R14; 5	HID; R15; 6	TOW; R16; 1	TOW; R17; 6	SMP; R18; 3	SMP; R19; 14	BEN; R20; Ret	BEN; R21; 13	BEN; R22; 13	SAN; R23; 4	BAT; R24; 8	SUR; R25; 11	SUR; R26; 11	ADE; R27; Ret	ADE; R28; 14														

=== Car No. 99 results ===
Year	Driver	No.	Make	1	2	3	4	5	6	7	8	9	10	11	12	13	14	15	16	17	18	19	20	21	22	23	24	25	26	27	28	29	30	31	32	33	34	35	36	37	38	39	40	Position	Pts
2013	Lee Holdsworth	4	Mercedes-Benz E63 AMG	ADE; R1; 17	ADE; R2; 17	SYM; R3; 23	SYM; R4; 17	SYM; R5; 13	PUK; R6; 18	PUK; R7; 25	PUK; R8; 17	PUK; R9; 22	BAR; R10; 18	BAR; R11; Ret	BAR; R12; 14	COA; R13; 27	COA; R14; 20	COA; R15; 21	COA; R16; 20	HID; R17; 18	HID; R18; 16	HID; R19; Ret	TOW; R20; Ret	TOW; R21; Ret	QLD; R22; Ret	QLD; R23; Ret	QLD; R24; 18	WIN; R25; 26	WIN; R26; 20	WIN; R27; 20	SAN; QR; 19	SAN; R28; 4	BAT; R29; 14	SUR; R30; 12	SUR; R31; 5	PHI; R32; 14	PHI; R33; 17	PHI; R34; Ret	SYD; R35; 23	SYD; R36; 13				20th	1361
2014	Lee Holdsworth	4	Mercedes-Benz E63 AMG	ADE; R1; 17	ADE; R2; 17	ADE; R3; 16	SYM; R4; 16	SYM; R5; 9	SYM; R6; 12	WIN; R7; 5	WIN; R8; 1	WIN; R9; 15	PUK; R10; 12	PUK; R11; 14	PUK; R12; 17	PUK; R13; 15	BAR; R14; 5	BAR; R15; 12	BAR; R16; 18	HID; R17; 10	HID; R18; Ret	HID; R19; 12	TOW; R20; 22	TOW; R21; 15	TOW; R22; 15	QLD; R23; 17	QLD; R24; 18	QLD; R25; 23	SMP; R26; 10	SMP; R27; 15	SMP; R28; 13	SAN; QR; 12	SAN; R29; Ret	BAT; R30; Ret	SUR; R31; 11	SUR; R32; Ret	PHI; R33; 19	PHI; R34; 20	PHI; R35; 13	SYD; R36; 17	SYD; R37; 24	SYD; R38; 18		20th	1395
2015	Ash Walsh	4	Mercedes-Benz E63 AMG	ADE; R1; 20	ADE; R2; 8	ADE; R3; Ret	SYM; R4; Ret	SYM; R5; 22	SYM; R6; 21	BAR; R7; 17	BAR; R8; 18	BAR; R9; 22	WIN; R10; 22	WIN; R11; 15	WIN; R12; 22	HID; R13; 21	HID; R14; 20	HID; R15; Ret	TOW; R16; 22	TOW; R17; 23	QLD; R18; 18	QLD; R19; Ret	QLD; R20; 22	SMP; R21; 25	SMP; R22; 16	SMP; R23; 21	SAN; Q 19	SAN; R24; 19	BAT; R25; Ret	SUR; R26; 19	SUR; R27; DSQ	PUK; R28; 20	PUK; R29; 21	PUK; R30; 24	PHI; R31	PHI; R32	PHI; R33	SYD; R34	SYD; R35	SYD; R36				25th	769
2016	Aaren Russell	4	Holden	ADE; R1; 25	ADE; R2; 22	ADE; R3; DNS	SYM; R4; 23	SYM; R5; 17	PHI; R6; 25	PHI; R7; 22	BAR; R8; 25	BAR; R9; 24	WIN; R10; 24	WIN; R11; 24	HID; R12; 22	HID; R13; 19	TOW; R14; 22	TOW; R15; 21																										28th	627
2016	Craig Baird	4	Holden	ADE; R1	ADE; R2	ADE; R3	SYM; R4	SYM; R5	PHI; R6	PHI; R7	BAR; R8	BAR; R9	WIN; R10	WIN; R11	HID; R12	HID; R13	TOW; R14	TOW; R15	QLD; R16; 24	QLD; R17; 22																								50th	219
2016	Shae Davies	4	Holden	ADE; R1	ADE; R2	ADE; R3	SYM; R4	SYM; R5	PHI; R6	PHI; R7	BAR; R8	BAR; R9	WIN; R10	WIN; R11	HID; R12	HID; R13	TOW; R14	TOW; R15	QLD; R16	QLD; R17	SMP; R18; 25	SMP; R19; 25	SAN; R20; 22	BAT; R21; 17	SUR; R22; 19	SUR; R23; DNS	PUK; R24; 23	PUK; R25; 25	PUK; R26; 24	PUK; R27; 23	SYD; R28; 22	SYD; R29; 17												36th	454
2017	Dale Wood	99	Holden	ADE; R1; Ret	ADE; R2; 20	SYM; R3; 8	SYM; R4; 14	PHI; R5; Ret	PHI; R6; 8	BAR; R7; 21	BAR; R8; 21	WIN; R9; 21	WIN; R10; 26	HID; R11; 25	HID; R12; 22	TOW; R13; 16	TOW; R14; 22	QLD; R15; 23	QLD; R16; Ret	SMP; R17; 16	SMP; R18; 22	SAN; QR; 7	SAN; R19; 13	BAT; R20; 4	SUR; R21; 22	SUR; R22; 18	PUK; R23; 20	PUK; R24; 20	NEW; R25; 18	NEW; R26; 20														23rd	1221
2018	Anton De Pasquale	99	Holden	ADE; R1; 19	ADE; R2; 17	MEL; R3; 15	MEL; R4; 19	MEL; R5; 20	MEL; R6; 15	SYM; R7; 19	SYM; R8; 15	PHI; R9; 7	PHI; R10; 16	BAR; R11; 18	BAR; R12; 23	WIN; R13; 12	WIN; R14; 16	HID; R15; 11	HID; R16; 16	TOW; R17; 19	TOW; R18; 17	QLD; R19; 26	QLD; R20; 16	SMP; R21; 18	BEN; R22; 24	BEN; R23; 11	SAN; QR; 9	SAN; R24; 18	BAT; R25; 24	SUR; R26; Ret	SUR; R27; C	PUK; R28; 19	PUK; R29; 24	NEW; R30; 11	NEW; R31; 16									20th	1524
2019	Anton De Pasquale	99	Holden	ADE; R1; 16	ADE; R2; 14	MEL; R3; 11	MEL; R4; 13	MEL; R5; 11	MEL; R6; 12	SYM; R7; 9	SYM; R8; 23	PHI; R9; 12	PHI; R10; 3	BAR; R11; 13	BAR; R12; 7	WIN; R13; 18	WIN; R14; 17	HID; R15; 11	HID; R16; 8	TOW; R17; 11	TOW; R18; 4	QLD; R19; 14	QLD; R20; 11	BEN; R21; 3	BEN; R22; 7	PUK; R23; 15	PUK; R24; 20	BAT; R25; Ret	SUR; R26; 11	SUR; R27; 8	SAN; QR; 13	SAN; R28; 10	NEW; R29; 23	NEW; R30; Ret										14th	2015
2020	Anton De Pasquale	99	Holden	ADE; R1; 14	ADE; R2; Ret	MEL; R3; C	MEL; R4; C	MEL; R5; C	MEL; R6; C	SMP1; R7; 8	SMP1; R8; 12	SMP1; R9; 7	SMP2; R10; 3	SMP2; R11; 13	SMP2; R12; 19	HID1; R13; 1	HID1; R14; 7	HID1; R15; 23	HID2; R16; 6	HID2; R17; 12	HID2; R18; 9	TOW1; R19; 10	TOW1; R20; 8	TOW1; R21; 7	TOW2; R22; 5	TOW2; R23; 16	TOW2; R24; Ret	BEN1; R25; 8	BEN1; R26; 5	BEN1; R27; 4	BEN2; R28; 5	BEN2; R29; 2	BEN2; R30; 11	BAT; R31; 9										8th	1637
2021	Brodie Kostecki	99	Holden	BAT; R1; 11	BAT; R2; 12	SAN; R3; 17	SAN; R4; 13	SAN; R5; 2	SYM; R6; 10	SYM; R7; 16	SYM; R8; 18	BEN; R9; 6	BEN; R10; 5	BEN; R11; 11	HID; R12; 8	HID; R13; 15	HID; R14; 24	TOW1; R15; 13	TOW1; R16; 15	TOW2; R17; 22	TOW2; R18; 7	TOW2; R19; 14	SYD1; R20; 3	SYD1; R21; 4	SYD1; R22; 15	SYD2; R23; 23	SYD2; R24; 20	SYD2; R25; Ret	SYD3; R26; 4	SYD3; R27; 9	SYD3; R28; 11	SYD4; R29; 8	SYD4; R30; C	BAT; R31; 3										9th	1788
2022	Brodie Kostecki	99	Holden	SMP; R1; 5	SMP; R2; 2	SYM; R3; 4	SYM; R4; 19	SYM; R5; 22	MEL; R6; 14	MEL; R7; 7	MEL; R8; 15	MEL; R9; 5	BAR; R10; 8	BAR; R11; 6	BAR; R12; 21	WIN; R13; 7	WIN; R14; 11	WIN; R15; 13	HID; R16; 10	HID; R17; 16	HID; R18; 24	TOW; R19; 12	TOW; R20; 16	BEN; R21; 6	BEN; R22; 24	BEN; R23; 3	SAN; R24; 11	SAN; R25; 23	SAN; R26; 16	PUK; R27; 20	PUK; R28; 18	PUK; R29; 19	BAT; R30; 4	SUR; R31; 7	SUR; R32; 5	ADE; R33; 4	ADE; R34; 8							7th	2142
2023	Brodie Kostecki	99	Chevrolet	NEW; R1; 3	NEW; R2; 6	MEL; R3; 2	MEL; R4; 1	MEL; R5; 1	MEL; R6; 3	BAR; R7; 2	BAR; R8; 2	BAR; R9; 3	SYM; R10; 23	SYM; R11; 2	SYM; R12; 3	HID; R13; 4	HID; R14; 4	HID; R15; 26	TOW; R16; 19	TOW; R17; 2	SMP; R18; 1	SMP; R19; 8	BEN; R20; 1	BEN; R21; 1	BEN; R22; 1	SAN; R23; 2	BAT; R24; 2	SUR; R25; 5	SUR; R26; 2	ADE; R27; 6	ADE; R28; 8													1st	

=== Bathurst 1000 Results ===
Year	No.	Car	Drivers	Pos.	Laps
2013	4	Mercedes-Benz E63 AMG	(Australia) Lee Holdsworth (New Zealand) Craig Baird	14th	161
2013	9	Mercedes-Benz E63 AMG	(Germany) Maro Engel (Australia) Steven Johnson	20th	160
2014	4	Mercedes-Benz E63 AMG	(Australia) Lee Holdsworth (New Zealand) Craig Baird	Ret	132
2014	9	Mercedes-Benz E63 AMG	(Australia) Will Davison (Australia) Alex Davison	4th	161
2015	4	Mercedes-Benz E63 AMG	(Australia) Ashley Walsh (Australia) Jack Le Brocq	Ret	135
2015	9	Mercedes-Benz E63 AMG	(Australia) Will Davison (Australia) Alex Davison	12th	161
2016	4	Holden Commodore VF	(Australia) Shae Davies (New Zealand) Chris van der Drift	17th	156
2016	9	Holden Commodore VF	(Australia) David Reynolds (New Zealand) Craig Baird	18th	148
2017	9	Holden Commodore VF	(Australia) David Reynolds (Australia) Luke Youlden	1st	161
2017	99	Holden Commodore VF	(Australia) Dale Wood (New Zealand) Chris Pither	4th	161
2018	9	Holden Commodore ZB	(Australia) David Reynolds (Australia) Luke Youlden	13th	161
2018	99	Holden Commodore ZB	(Australia) Anton de Pasquale (Australia) Will Brown	24th	143
2019	9	Holden Commodore ZB	(Australia) David Reynolds (Australia) Luke Youlden	5th	161
2019	99	Holden Commodore ZB	(Australia) Anton de Pasquale (Australia) Will Brown	Ret	125
2020	9	Holden Commodore ZB	(Australia) David Reynolds (Australia) Will Brown	15th	160
2020	99	Holden Commodore ZB	(Australia) Anton de Pasquale (Australia) Brodie Kostecki	9th	161
2021	9	Holden Commodore ZB	(Australia) Will Brown (Australia) Jack Perkins	20th	150
2021	99	Holden Commodore ZB	(Australia) Brodie Kostecki (Australia) David Russell	3rd	161
2022	9	Holden Commodore ZB	(Australia) Will Brown (Australia) Jack Perkins	10th	161
2022	51	Holden Commodore ZB	(New Zealand) Greg Murphy (New Zealand) Richie Stanaway	11th	161
2022	99	Holden Commodore ZB	(Australia) Brodie Kostecki (Australia) David Russell	4th	161
2023	9	Chevrolet Camaro ZL1-1LE	(Australia) Will Brown (Australia) Jack Perkins	8th	161
2023	99	Chevrolet Camaro ZL1-1LE	(Australia) Brodie Kostecki (Australia) David Russell	2nd	161
2024	1	Chevrolet Camaro ZL1-1LE	(Australia) Brodie Kostecki (Australia) Todd Hazelwood	1st	161
2024	9	Chevrolet Camaro ZL1-1LE	(Australia) Jack Le Brocq (Australia) Jayden Ojeda	8th	161
2025	9	Chevrolet Camaro ZL1-1LE	(Australia) Jack Le Brocq (Australia) Jarrod Hughes	14th	161
2025	99	Chevrolet Camaro ZL1-1LE	(Australia) Cooper Murray (Australia) Jobe Stewart	4th	161

== See also ==
- Stone Brothers Racing
- Mercedes-Benz in motorsport
