= 2018 Adelaide 500 =

Motor racing event in Adelaide, Australia

(South Australia) 2018 Adelaide 500
Event Information
- Round 1 of 16 in the 2018 Supercars Championship
- Layout of the Adelaide Street Circuit
- Date: 2–4 March 2018
- Location: Adelaide, South Australia
- Venue: Adelaide Street Circuit

Results
Race 1
Distance	78 laps	251.736 km
Pole position	(New Zealand) Shane van Gisbergen; Triple Eight Race Engineering	1:19.8304
Winner	(New Zealand) Shane van Gisbergen; Triple Eight Race Engineering	1:56:18.6539
Race 2
Distance	78 laps	251.736 km
Pole position	(New Zealand) Shane van Gisbergen; Triple Eight Race Engineering	1:19.5831
Winner	(New Zealand) Shane van Gisbergen; Triple Eight Race Engineering	1:48:02.0911

The 2018 Adelaide 500 was a motor racing event held on the weekend of 2 to 4 March 2018 at the Adelaide Street Circuit in Adelaide, South Australia. It marked the twentieth running of the Adelaide 500 and was the first event of sixteen in the 2018 Supercars Championship. It comprised two races of 250 kilometres. Support races included the opening round of the 2018 Super2 Series, a series for older model Supercars and the inaugural round of the new SuperUtes Series.

Shane van Gisbergen won both Race 1 and Race 2, driving a Holden Commodore ZB for Triple Eight Race Engineering.

== Results ==
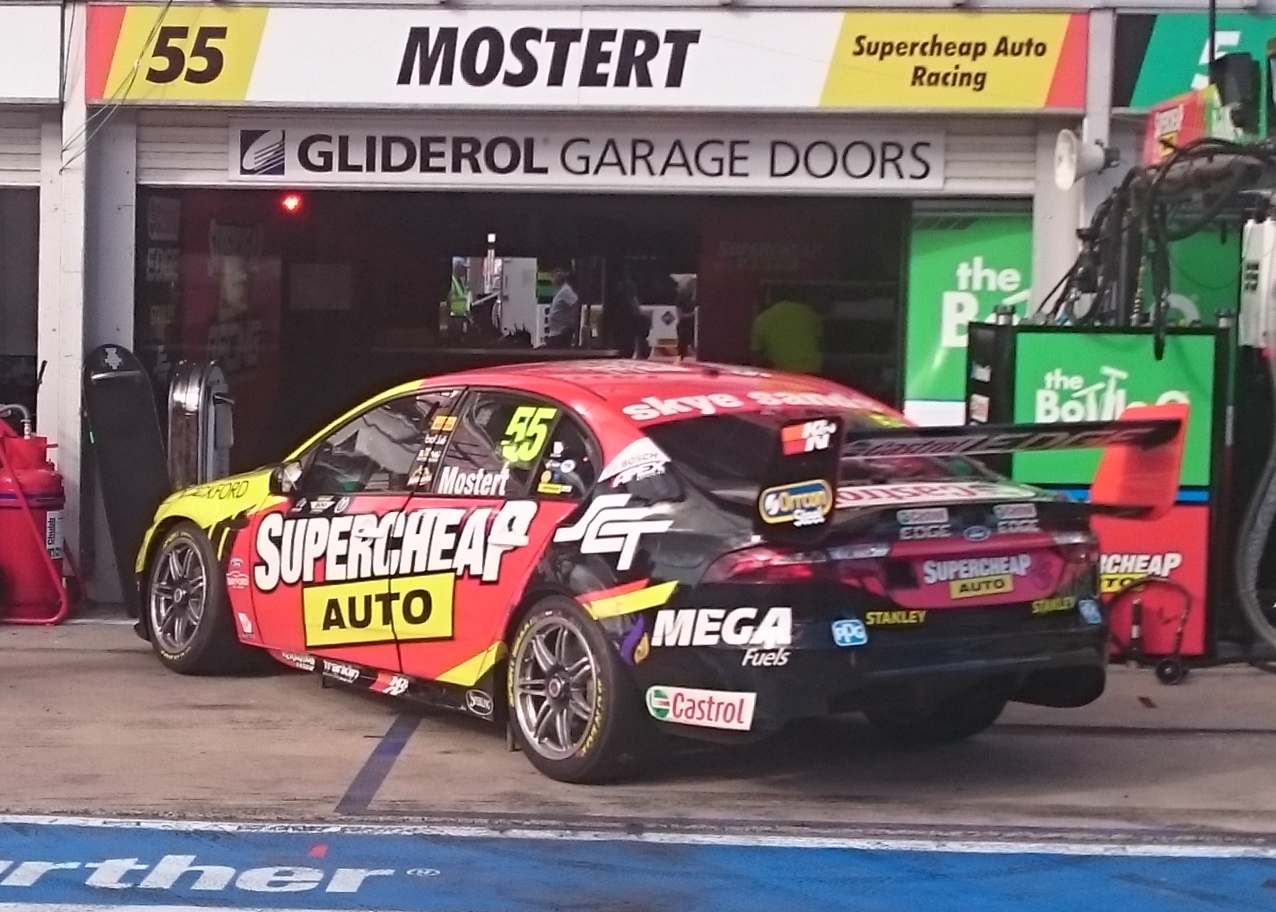
Chaz Mostert placed fourth in Race 2 driving a Ford Falcon FG X for Tickford Racing

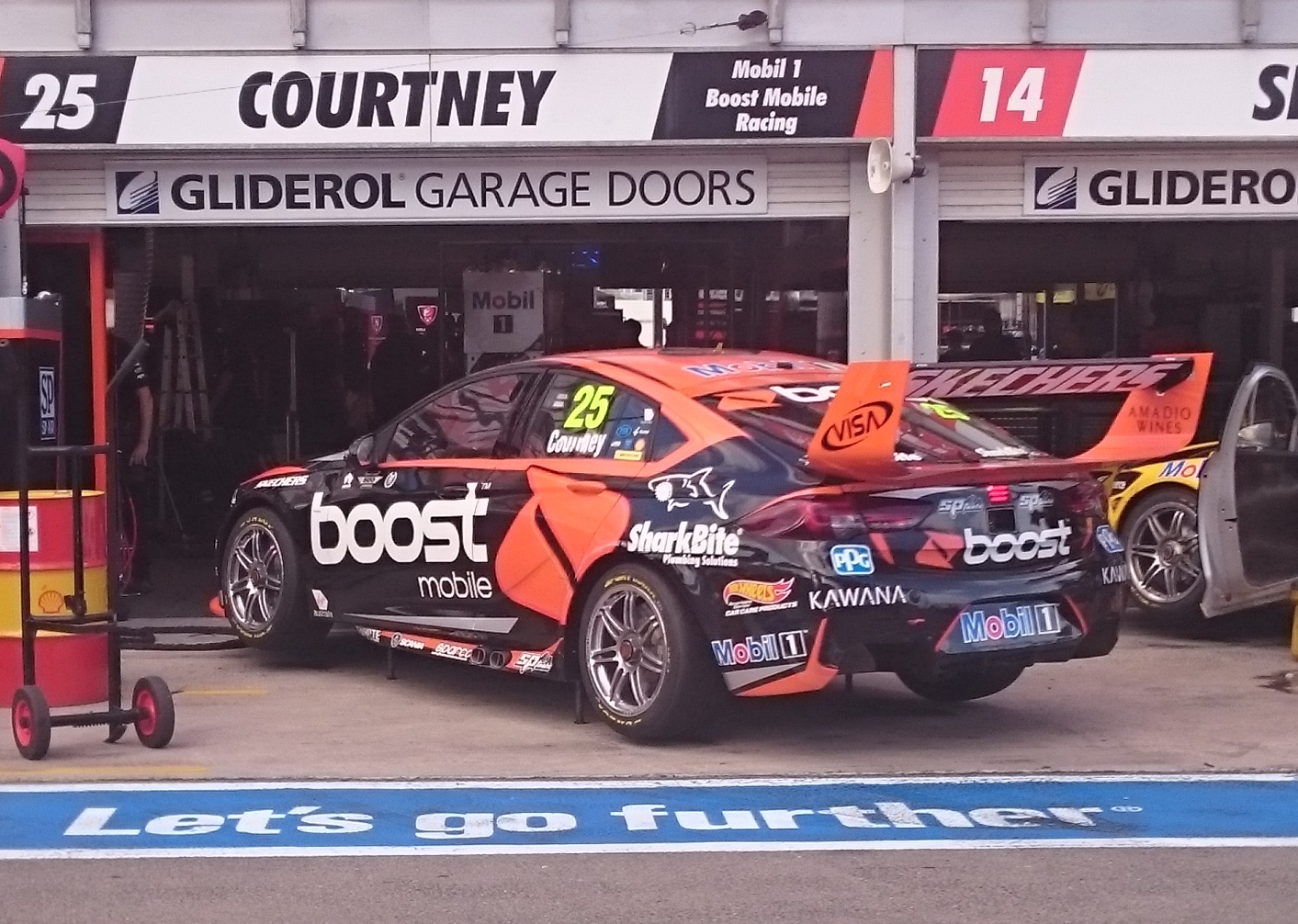
James Courtney placed sixth in Race 2 driving a Holden Commodore ZB for Walkinshaw Andretti United

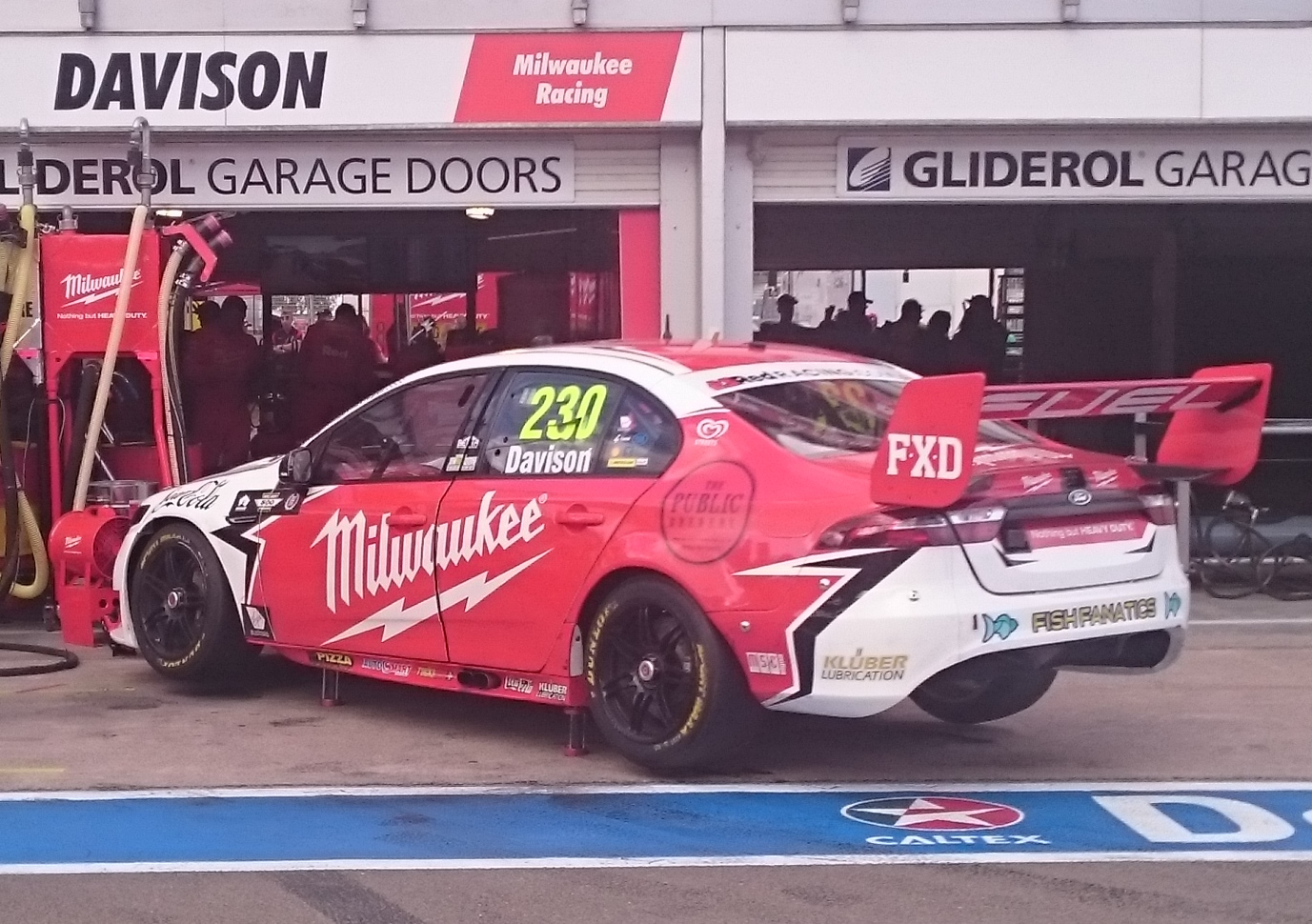
Will Davison placed twelfth in Race 2 driving a Ford Falcon FG X for 23Red Racing. The event marked the championship debut for the team.

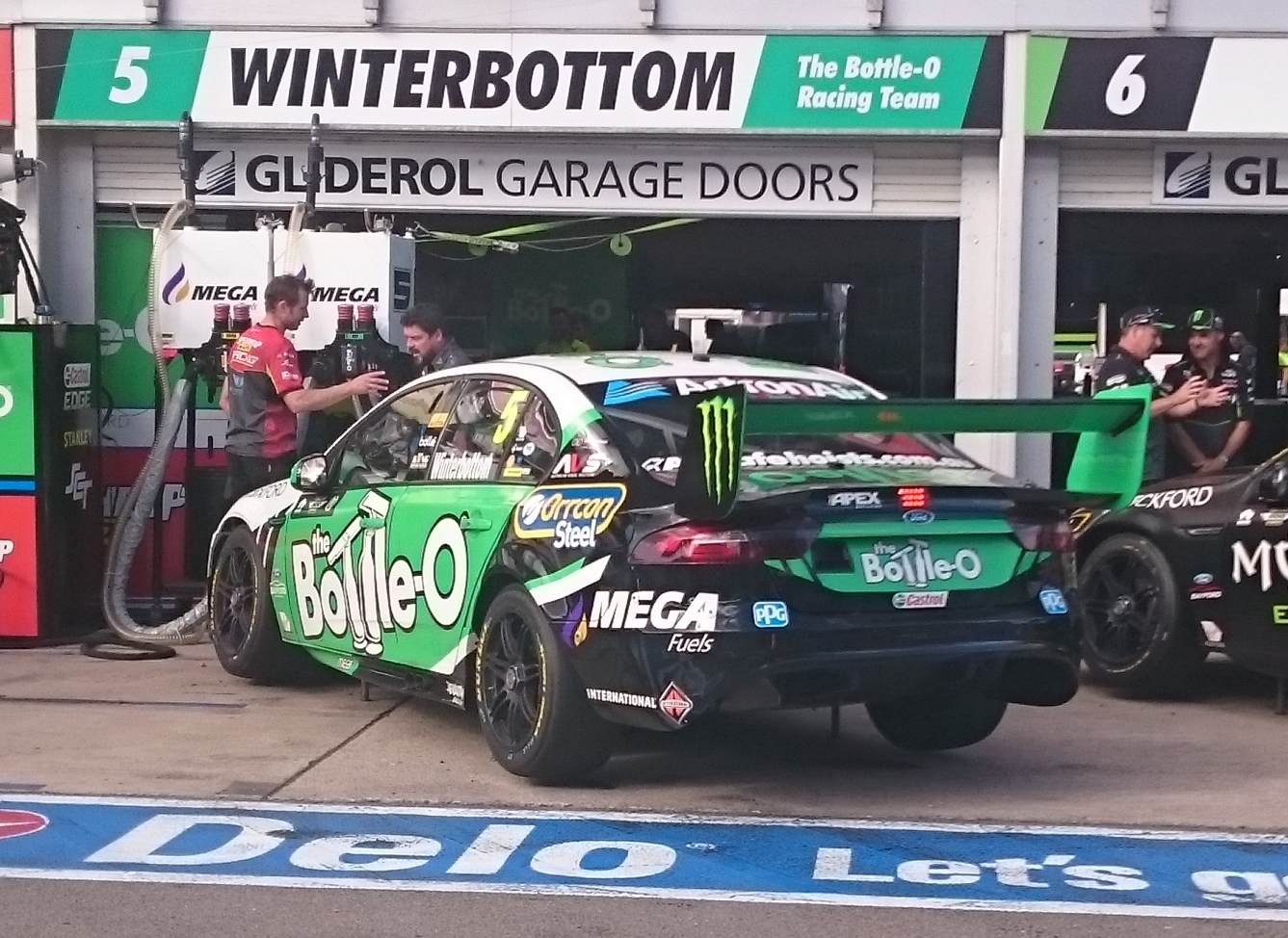
Mark Winterbottom placed 13th in Race 2 driving a Ford Falcon FG X for Tickford Racing

=== Practice ===
Practice summary
Session	Day	Fastest lap				
Session	Day	No.	Driver	Team	Car	Time
Practice 1	Friday	1	(Australia) Jamie Whincup	Triple Eight Race Engineering	Holden Commodore ZB	1:20.1622
Practice 2	Friday	17	(New Zealand) Scott McLaughlin	DJR Team Penske	Ford Falcon FG X	1:20.3567
Practice 3	Saturday	17	(New Zealand) Scott McLaughlin	DJR Team Penske	Ford Falcon FG X	1:19.8117

=== Race 1 ===
==== Qualifying ====
Pos.	No.	Driver	Team	Car	Time	Gap	Grid
1	97	(New Zealand) Shane van Gisbergen	Triple Eight Race Engineering	Holden Commodore ZB	1:20.2467		Top 10
2	17	(New Zealand) Scott McLaughlin	DJR Team Penske	Ford Falcon FG X	1:20.2477	+0.0010	Top 10
3	25	(Australia) James Courtney	Walkinshaw Andretti United	Holden Commodore ZB	1:20.2538	+0.0071	Top 10
4	5	(Australia) Mark Winterbottom	Tickford Racing	Ford Falcon FG X	1:20.2968	+0.0501	Top 10
5	9	(Australia) David Reynolds	Erebus Motorsport	Holden Commodore ZB	1:20.4195	+0.1728	Top 10
6	8	(Australia) Nick Percat	Brad Jones Racing	Holden Commodore ZB	1:20.4523	+0.2056	Top 10
7	230	(Australia) Will Davison	23Red Racing	Ford Falcon FG X	1:20.4882	+0.2415	Top 10
8	18	(Australia) Lee Holdsworth	Team 18	Holden Commodore ZB	1:20.4910	+0.2443	Top 10
9	1	(Australia) Jamie Whincup	Triple Eight Race Engineering	Holden Commodore ZB	1:20.5111	+0.2644	Top 10
10	15	(Australia) Rick Kelly	Nissan Motorsport	Nissan Altima L33	1:20.5181	+0.2714	Top 10
11	7	(New Zealand) Andre Heimgartner	Nissan Motorsport	Nissan Altima L33	1:20.5604	+0.3137	11
12	55	(Australia) Chaz Mostert	Tickford Racing	Ford Falcon FG X	1:20.5935	+0.3468	12
13	2	(Australia) Scott Pye	Walkinshaw Andretti United	Holden Commodore ZB	1:20.6566	+0.4099	13
14	14	(Australia) Tim Slade	Brad Jones Racing	Holden Commodore ZB	1:20.7325	+0.4858	14
15	888	(Australia) Craig Lowndes	Triple Eight Race Engineering	Holden Commodore ZB	1:20.7331	+0.4864	15
16	56	(New Zealand) Richie Stanaway	Tickford Racing	Ford Falcon FG X	1:20.8020	+0.5553	16
17	33	(Australia) Garth Tander	Garry Rogers Motorsport	Holden Commodore ZB	1:20.8094	+0.5627	17
18	12	(New Zealand) Fabian Coulthard	DJR Team Penske	Ford Falcon FG X	1:20.8532	+0.6065	18
19	6	(Australia) Cam Waters	Tickford Racing	Ford Falcon FG X	1:20.8872	+0.6405	19
20	23	(Australia) Michael Caruso	Nissan Motorsport	Nissan Altima L33	1:20.9099	+0.6632	20
21	99	(Australia) Anton de Pasquale	Erebus Motorsport	Holden Commodore ZB	1:21.1342	+0.8875	21
22	21	(Australia) Tim Blanchard	Tim Blanchard Racing	Holden Commodore ZB	1:21.1451	+0.8984	22
23	78	(Switzerland) Simona de Silvestro	Nissan Motorsport	Nissan Altima L33	1:21.2577	+1.0110	23
24	35	(Australia) Todd Hazelwood	Matt Stone Racing	Ford Falcon FG X	1:21.5070	+1.2603	24
25	34	(Australia) James Golding	Garry Rogers Motorsport	Holden Commodore ZB	1:21.7529	+1.5062	25
26	19	(Australia) Jack Le Brocq	Tekno Autosports	Holden Commodore ZB	1:22.8170	+2.5703	26

==== Top 10 Shootout ====
Pos.	No.	Driver	Team	Car	Time	Gap	Grid
1	97	(New Zealand) Shane van Gisbergen	Triple Eight Race Engineering	Holden Commodore ZB	1:19.8304		1
2	17	(New Zealand) Scott McLaughlin	DJR Team Penske	Ford Falcon FG X	1:20.2587	+0.4283	2
3	25	(Australia) James Courtney	Walkinshaw Andretti United	Holden Commodore ZB	1:20.3793	+0.5489	3
4	9	(Australia) David Reynolds	Erebus Motorsport	Holden Commodore ZB	1:20.4004	+0.5700	4
5	1	(Australia) Jamie Whincup	Triple Eight Race Engineering	Holden Commodore ZB	1:20.6941	+0.8637	5
6	5	(Australia) Mark Winterbottom	Tickford Racing	Ford Falcon FG X	1:20.7722	+0.9418	6
7	15	(Australia) Rick Kelly	Nissan Motorsport	Nissan Altima L33	1:20.9229	+1.0925	7
8	230	(Australia) Will Davison	23Red Racing	Ford Falcon FG X	1:20.9467	+1.1163	8
9	8	(Australia) Nick Percat	Brad Jones Racing	Holden Commodore ZB	1:21.4658	+1.6354	9
10	18	(Australia) Lee Holdsworth	Team 18	Holden Commodore ZB	1:21.4922	+1.6618	10

==== Race ====
Pos	No.	Driver	Team	Car	Laps	Time / Retired	Grid	Points
1	97	(New Zealand) Shane van Gisbergen	Triple Eight Race Engineering	Holden Commodore ZB	78	1:56:18.6539	1	150
2	25	(Australia) James Courtney	Walkinshaw Andretti United	Holden Commodore ZB	78	+1.222	3	138
3	17	(New Zealand) Scott McLaughlin	DJR Team Penske	Ford Falcon FG X	78	+3.431	2	129
4	9	(Australia) David Reynolds	Erebus Motorsport	Holden Commodore ZB	78	+4.479	4	120
5	5	(Australia) Mark Winterbottom	Tickford Racing	Ford Falcon FG X	78	+6.749	6	111
6	1	(Australia) Jamie Whincup	Triple Eight Race Engineering	Holden Commodore ZB	78	+7.666	5	102
7	55	(Australia) Chaz Mostert	Tickford Racing	Ford Falcon FG X	78	+9.470	12	96
8	230	(Australia) Will Davison	23Red Racing	Ford Falcon FG X	78	+10.317	8	90
9	888	(Australia) Craig Lowndes	Triple Eight Race Engineering	Holden Commodore ZB	78	+10.925	15	84
10	2	(Australia) Scott Pye	Walkinshaw Andretti United	Holden Commodore ZB	78	+13.304	13	78
11	8	(Australia) Nick Percat	Brad Jones Racing	Holden Commodore ZB	78	+16.902	9	72
12	18	(Australia) Lee Holdsworth	Team 18	Holden Commodore ZB	78	+16.916^{1}	10	69
13	14	(Australia) Tim Slade	Brad Jones Racing	Holden Commodore ZB	78	+18.457	14	66
14	23	(Australia) Michael Caruso	Nissan Motorsport	Nissan Altima L33	78	+20.158	20	63
15	6	(Australia) Cam Waters	Tickford Racing	Ford Falcon FG X	78	+21.014	19	60
16	33	(Australia) Garth Tander	Garry Rogers Motorsport	Holden Commodore ZB	78	+21.336^{2}	17	57
17	7	(New Zealand) Andre Heimgartner	Nissan Motorsport	Nissan Altima L33	78	+27.542	11	54
18	78	(Switzerland) Simona de Silvestro	Nissan Motorsport	Nissan Altima L33	78	+29.277	23	51
19	99	(Australia) Anton de Pasquale	Erebus Motorsport	Holden Commodore ZB	77	+1 lap	21	48
20	19	(Australia) Jack Le Brocq	Tekno Autosports	Holden Commodore ZB	77	+1 lap	26	45
21	12	(New Zealand) Fabian Coulthard	DJR Team Penske	Ford Falcon FG X	75	+3 laps	18	42
22	35	(Australia) Todd Hazelwood	Matt Stone Racing	Ford Falcon FG X	75	+3 laps	24	39
23	15	(Australia) Rick Kelly	Nissan Motorsport	Nissan Altima L33	65	+13 laps	7	36
NC	56	(New Zealand) Richie Stanaway	Tickford Racing	Ford Falcon FG X	77	Drivetrain	16	
NC	21	(Australia) Tim Blanchard	Tim Blanchard Racing	Holden Commodore ZB	58	Accident	22	
NC	34	(Australia) James Golding	Garry Rogers Motorsport	Holden Commodore ZB	55	Accident damage	25	
Fastest lap: Jamie Whincup (Triple Eight Race Engineering) 1:21.0950 (on lap 21)

Notes

- ^1 – Lee Holdsworth received a 5 second Time penalty for Careless Driving, causing contact with Garth Tander separating the Pit Lane from the Race Track at Pit Entry.
- ^2 – Garth Tander received a 5 second Time penalty after being found guilty for the incident with Craig Lowndes and Cam Waters.

==== Championship standings after Race 1 ====
Drivers Championship

Pos	Driver	Pts	Gap
1	(New Zealand) Shane van Gisbergen	150	
2	(Australia) James Courtney	138	-12
3	(New Zealand) Scott McLaughlin	129	-21
4	(Australia) David Reynolds	120	-30
5	(Australia) Mark Winterbottom	111	-39

Teams Championship

Pos	Team	Pts	Gap
1	Triple Eight Race Engineering (1, 97)	262	
2	Walkinshaw Andretti United	216	-46
3	Tickford Racing (5, 55)	207	-55
4	DJR Team Penske	171	-91
5	Erebus Motorsport	168	-94

- Note: Only the top five positions are included for both sets of standings.

=== Race 2 ===
==== Qualifying ====
Pos.	No.	Driver	Team	Car	Time	Gap	Grid
1	17	(New Zealand) Scott McLaughlin	DJR Team Penske	Ford Falcon FG X	1:19.6900		Top 10
2	97	(New Zealand) Shane van Gisbergen	Triple Eight Race Engineering	Holden Commodore ZB	1:19.8056	+0.1156	Top 10
3	1	(Australia) Jamie Whincup	Triple Eight Race Engineering	Holden Commodore ZB	1:19.8268	+0.1368	Top 10
4	33	(Australia) Garth Tander	Garry Rogers Motorsport	Holden Commodore ZB	1:19.9113	+0.2213	Top 10
5	55	(Australia) Chaz Mostert	Tickford Racing	Ford Falcon FG X	1:19.9187	+0.2287	Top 10
6	9	(Australia) David Reynolds	Erebus Motorsport	Holden Commodore ZB	1:19.9544	+0.2644	Top 10
7	5	(Australia) Mark Winterbottom	Tickford Racing	Ford Falcon FG X	1:19.9736	+0.2836	Top 10
8	7	(New Zealand) Andre Heimgartner	Nissan Motorsport	Nissan Altima L33	1:19.9926	+0.3026	Top 10
9	23	(Australia) Michael Caruso	Nissan Motorsport	Nissan Altima L33	1:20.0101	+0.3202	Top 10
10	6	(Australia) Cam Waters	Tickford Racing	Ford Falcon FG X	1:20.0477	+0.3577	Top 10
11	14	(Australia) Tim Slade	Brad Jones Racing	Holden Commodore ZB	1:20.0905	+0.4005	11
12	12	(New Zealand) Fabian Coulthard	DJR Team Penske	Ford Falcon FG X	1:20.1217	+0.4317	12
13	18	(Australia) Lee Holdsworth	Team 18	Holden Commodore ZB	1:20.1579	+0.4679	13
14	25	(Australia) James Courtney	Walkinshaw Andretti United	Holden Commodore ZB	1:20.1765	+0.4866	14
15	2	(Australia) Scott Pye	Walkinshaw Andretti United	Holden Commodore ZB	1:20.1814	+0.4914	15
16	15	(Australia) Rick Kelly	Nissan Motorsport	Nissan Altima L33	1:20.2008	+0.5108	16
17	888	(Australia) Craig Lowndes	Triple Eight Race Engineering	Holden Commodore ZB	1:20.2239	+0.5339	17
18	56	(New Zealand) Richie Stanaway	Tickford Racing	Ford Falcon FG X	1:20.2998	+0.6099	18
19	99	(Australia) Anton de Pasquale	Erebus Motorsport	Holden Commodore ZB	1:20.4077	+0.7178	19
20	8	(Australia) Nick Percat	Brad Jones Racing	Holden Commodore ZB	1:20.4235	+0.7336	20
21	230	(Australia) Will Davison	23Red Racing	Ford Falcon FG X	1:20.4310	+0.7410	21
22	19	(Australia) Jack Le Brocq	Tekno Autosports	Holden Commodore ZB	1:20.4388	+0.7488	22
23	34	(Australia) James Golding	Garry Rogers Motorsport	Holden Commodore ZB	1:20.5314	+0.8415	23
24	35	(Australia) Todd Hazelwood	Matt Stone Racing	Ford Falcon FG X	1:20.7843	+1.0943	24
25	78	(Switzerland) Simona de Silvestro	Nissan Motorsport	Nissan Altima L33	1:21.0224	+1.3324	25
26	21	(Australia) Tim Blanchard	Tim Blanchard Racing	Holden Commodore ZB	1:21.0464	+1.3565	26

==== Top 10 Shootout ====
Pos.	No.	Driver	Team	Car	Time	Gap	Grid
1	97	(New Zealand) Shane van Gisbergen	Triple Eight Race Engineering	Holden Commodore ZB	1:19.5831		1
2	1	(Australia) Jamie Whincup	Triple Eight Race Engineering	Holden Commodore ZB	1:19.5915	+0.0084	2
3	17	(New Zealand) Scott McLaughlin	DJR Team Penske	Ford Falcon FG X	1:19.7598	+0.1767	3
4	9	(Australia) David Reynolds	Erebus Motorsport	Holden Commodore ZB	1:19.8870	+0.3039	4
5	5	(Australia) Mark Winterbottom	Tickford Racing	Ford Falcon FG X	1:20.1177	+0.5346	5
6	6	(Australia) Cam Waters	Tickford Racing	Ford Falcon FG X	1:20.1872	+0.6042	6
7	55	(Australia) Chaz Mostert	Tickford Racing	Ford Falcon FG X	1:20.2360	+0.6530	7
8	33	(Australia) Garth Tander	Garry Rogers Motorsport	Holden Commodore ZB	1:20.2887	+0.7057	8
9	23	(Australia) Michael Caruso	Nissan Motorsport	Nissan Altima L33	1:20.5378	+0.9547	9
10	7	(New Zealand) Andre Heimgartner	Nissan Motorsport	Nissan Altima L33	No time		10

==== Race ====
Pos	No.	Driver	Team	Car	Laps	Time / Retired	Grid	Points
1	97	(New Zealand) Shane van Gisbergen	Triple Eight Race Engineering	Holden Commodore ZB	78	1:48:02.0911	1	150
2	9	(Australia) David Reynolds	Erebus Motorsport	Holden Commodore ZB	78	+0.8247	4	138
3	33	(Australia) Garth Tander	Garry Rogers Motorsport	Holden Commodore ZB	78	+3.6322	8	129
4	55	(Australia) Chaz Mostert	Tickford Racing	Ford Falcon FG X	78	+5.9563	7	120
5	6	(Australia) Cam Waters	Tickford Racing	Ford Falcon FG X	78	+11.2706	6	111
6	25	(Australia) James Courtney	Walkinshaw Andretti United	Holden Commodore ZB	78	+13.9504	14	102
7	888	(Australia) Craig Lowndes	Triple Eight Race Engineering	Holden Commodore ZB	78	+14.6830	17	96
8	2	(Australia) Scott Pye	Walkinshaw Andretti United	Holden Commodore ZB	78	+16.8859	15	90
9	23	(Australia) Michael Caruso	Nissan Motorsport	Nissan Altima L33	78	+17.2717	9	84
10	17	(New Zealand) Scott McLaughlin	DJR Team Penske	Ford Falcon FG X	78	+25.0862	3	78
11	14	(Australia) Tim Slade	Brad Jones Racing	Holden Commodore ZB	78	+25.7981	11	72
12	230	(Australia) Will Davison	23Red Racing	Ford Falcon FG X	78	+30.2347	21	69
13	5	(Australia) Mark Winterbottom	Tickford Racing	Ford Falcon FG X	78	+30.7273	5	66
14	15	(Australia) Rick Kelly	Nissan Motorsport	Nissan Altima L33	78	+34.9234	16	63
15	8	(Australia) Nick Percat	Brad Jones Racing	Holden Commodore ZB	78	+35.5774	20	60
16	12	(New Zealand) Fabian Coulthard	DJR Team Penske	Ford Falcon FG X	78	+42.1848	12	57
17	99	(Australia) Anton de Pasquale	Erebus Motorsport	Holden Commodore ZB	78	+44.0455	19	54
18	78	(Switzerland) Simona de Silvestro	Nissan Motorsport	Nissan Altima L33	78	+51.8463	25	51
19	34	(Australia) James Golding	Garry Rogers Motorsport	Holden Commodore ZB	78	+1:03.2025	23	48
20	56	(New Zealand) Richie Stanaway	Tickford Racing	Ford Falcon FG X	78	+1:06.3546	18	45
21	35	(Australia) Todd Hazelwood	Matt Stone Racing	Ford Falcon FG X	77	+1 lap	24	42
22	19	(Australia) Jack Le Brocq	Tekno Autosports	Holden Commodore ZB	77	+1 lap^{1}	22	39
23	21	(Australia) Tim Blanchard	Tim Blanchard Racing	Holden Commodore ZB	71	+7 laps	26	36
24	18	(Australia) Lee Holdsworth	Team 18	Holden Commodore ZB	70	+8 laps	13	33
25	7	(New Zealand) Andre Heimgartner	Nissan Motorsport	Nissan Altima L33	61	+17 laps	10	30
NC	1	(Australia) Jamie Whincup	Triple Eight Race Engineering	Holden Commodore ZB	30	Transaxle	2	
Fastest lap: Jamie Whincup (Triple Eight Race Engineering) 1:20.9194 (on lap 10)

Notes

- ^1 – Jack Le Brocq received a 15 second Time penalty for crossing the chevron separating the Pit Lane from the Race Track at Pit Entry.

==== Championship standings after Race 2 ====
Drivers Championship

	Pos	Driver	Pts	Gap
	1	(New Zealand) Shane van Gisbergen	300	
2	2	(Australia) David Reynolds	258	-42
1	3	(Australia) James Courtney	240	-60
3	4	(Australia) Chaz Mostert	216	-84
2	5	(New Zealand) Scott McLaughlin	207	-93

Teams Championship

	Pos	Team	Pts	Gap
1	1	Walkinshaw Andretti United	408	
1	2	Triple Eight Race Engineering (1, 97)	402	-6
	3	Tickford Racing (5, 55)	393	-15
1	4	Erebus Motorsport	330	-78
1	5	DJR Team Penske	306	-102

- Note: Only the top five positions are included for both sets of standings.
