= 2018 Bathurst 1000 =

Motor race in Australia

(New South Wales) 2018 Supercheap Auto Bathurst 1000
Event Information
- Round 13 of 16 in the 2018 Supercars Championship
- Layout of the Mount Panorama Circuit
- Date: 4–7 October 2018
- Location: Bathurst, New South Wales
- Venue: Mount Panorama Circuit
- Weather: Thursday: Intermittent showers, 15°C. Friday: Overcast with patchy showers, 12°C. Saturday: Sunny with light cloud, 17°C. Sunday: Overcast with brief light showers before clearing to fine late, 17°C.

Results
Race 1
Distance	161 laps	1000 km
Pole position	(Australia) David Reynolds; Erebus Motorsport	2:04.0589
Winner	(Australia) Craig Lowndes (New Zealand) Steven Richards; Triple Eight Race Engineering	6:01:44.8637

The 2018 Supercheap Auto Bathurst 1000 was a motor racing event for Supercars, held on the weekend of 4–7 October 2018. It was staged at the Mount Panorama Circuit in Bathurst, New South Wales, Australia and featured of a 1000 kilometre race. The event was the thirteenth of sixteen in the 2018 Supercars Championship and incorporated Race 25 of the series. It was also the second event of the 2018 Enduro Cup.

The race was won by Craig Lowndes and Steven Richards driving a Holden Commodore ZB for Triple Eight Race Engineering.

== Report ==
=== Background ===
The event was the 61st running of the Bathurst 1000, which was first held at the Phillip Island Grand Prix Circuit in 1960 as a 500-mile race for Australian-made standard production sedans, and marked the 58th time that the race was held at Mount Panorama. It was the 22nd running of the Australian 1000 race, which was first held after the organisational split between the Australian Racing Drivers Club and V8 Supercars Australia that saw two "Bathurst 1000" races contested in both 1997 and 1998. It was the 20th time the race had been held as part of the Supercars Championship and the sixth time it formed part of the Enduro Cup. The defending winners of the race were David Reynolds and Luke Youlden.

Shane van Gisbergen entered the event as the championship leader, 55 points clear of DJR Team Penske's Scott McLaughlin. Van Gisbergen's Triple Eight Race Engineering team-mate Jamie Whincup was third in the points standings, 338 points from the lead. In the Teams' Championship, Triple Eight held a 656-point lead over DJR Team Penske. In the Enduro Cup standings, Triple Eight team-mates Jamie Whincup and Paul Dumbrell led the pairing of Van Gisbergen and Earl Bamber by 24 points.

=== Entry list ===
Twenty-six cars were entered in the event. As in 2017, there were no additional "Wildcard" entries entered in the race. Four drivers would make their first start in the Bathurst 1000 - two-time Le Mans 24 Hours winner Earl Bamber, Super2 drivers Will Brown and Bryce Fullwood, and 'main-gamer' Anton de Pasquale. Teams Matt Stone Racing and 23Red Racing would also make their debuts in 'the Great Race', however the former contained many crew members from the former Stone Brothers Racing outfit and the latter was a continuation of Lucas Dumbrell Motorsport under new owners. It was the last start in the Bathurst 1000 for Paul Dumbrell and Jason Bright.

No.	Drivers	Team (Sponsor)	Car	No.	Drivers	Team	Car
1	(Australia) Jamie Whincup (Australia) Paul Dumbrell	Triple Eight Race Engineering (Red Bull, Holden)	Holden Commodore ZB	21	(Australia) Tim Blanchard (Australia) Dale Wood	Tim Blanchard Racing (CoolDrive)	Holden Commodore ZB
2	(Australia) Scott Pye (Australia) Warren Luff	Walkinshaw Andretti United (Mobil 1, Boost Mobile)	Holden Commodore ZB	23	(Australia) Michael Caruso (Australia) Dean Fiore	Nissan Motorsport (Industrial Athlete)	Nissan Altima L33
5	(Australia) Mark Winterbottom (Australia) Dean Canto	Tickford Racing (The Bottle-O)	Ford Falcon FG X	25	(Australia) James Courtney (Australia) Jack Perkins	Walkinshaw Andretti United (Mobil 1, Boost Mobile)	Holden Commodore ZB
6	(Australia) Cam Waters (Australia) David Russell	Tickford Racing (Monster Energy)	Ford Falcon FG X	33	(Australia) Garth Tander (New Zealand) Chris Pither	Garry Rogers Motorsport (Wilson Security)	Holden Commodore ZB
7	(New Zealand) Andre Heimgartner (Australia) Aaren Russell	Nissan Motorsport (Castrol, Plus Fitness)	Nissan Altima L33	34	(Australia) James Golding (Australia) Richard Muscat	Garry Rogers Motorsport (Wilson Security)	Holden Commodore ZB
8	(Australia) Nick Percat (Australia) Macauley Jones	Brad Jones Racing (Repco)	Holden Commodore ZB	35	(Australia) Todd Hazelwood (Australia) Bryce Fullwood	Matt Stone Racing (Bigmate GPS)	Holden Commodore VF
9	(Australia) David Reynolds (Australia) Luke Youlden	Erebus Motorsport (Penrite)	Holden Commodore ZB	55	(Australia) Chaz Mostert (Australia) James Moffat	Tickford Racing (Supercheap Auto)	Ford Falcon FG X
11	(Australia) Rick Kelly (Australia) Garry Jacobson	Nissan Motorsport (Castrol)	Nissan Altima L33	56	(New Zealand) Richie Stanaway (Australia) Steve Owen	Tickford Racing (Rabble Club)	Ford Falcon FG X
12	(New Zealand) Fabian Coulthard (Australia) Tony D'Alberto	DJR Team Penske (Shell)	Ford Falcon FG X	78	(Switzerland) Simona de Silvestro (Australia) Alex Rullo	Nissan Motorsport} (Harvey Norman)	Nissan Altima L33
14	(Australia) Tim Slade (Australia) Ashley Walsh	Brad Jones Racing (Freightliner)	Holden Commodore ZB	97	(New Zealand) Shane van Gisbergen (New Zealand) Earl Bamber	Triple Eight Race Engineering (Red Bull, Holden)	Holden Commodore ZB
17	(New Zealand) Scott McLaughlin (France) Alexandre Prémat	DJR Team Penske (Shell)	Ford Falcon FG X	99	(Australia) Anton de Pasquale (Australia) Will Brown	Erebus Motorsport (Penrite)	Holden Commodore ZB
18	(Australia) Lee Holdsworth (Australia) Jason Bright	Team 18 (Preston Hire)	Holden Commodore ZB	230	(Australia) Will Davison (Australia) Alex Davison	23Red Racing (Milwaukee Tools)	Ford Falcon FG X
19	(Australia) Jack Le Brocq (Australia) Jonathon Webb	Tekno Autosports (Truck Assist)	Holden Commodore ZB	888	(Australia) Craig Lowndes (New Zealand) Steven Richards	Triple Eight Race Engineering (Autobarn)	Holden Commodore ZB

== Results ==
=== Practice ===
Practice summary
Session	Day	Fastest lap					
Session	Day	No.	Driver	Team	Car	Time	Cond.
Practice 1	Thursday	230	(Australia) Will Davison	23Red Racing	Ford Falcon FG X	2:25.0243	Wet
Practice 2	Thursday	17	(France) Alexandre Prémat	DJR Team Penske	Ford Falcon FG X	2:35.1824	Wet
Practice 3	Thursday	56	(New Zealand) Richie Stanaway	Tickford Racing	Ford Falcon FG X	2:29.0174	Wet
Practice 4	Friday	9	(Australia) Luke Youlden	Erebus Motorsport	Holden Commodore ZB	2:06.6470	Drying
Practice 5	Friday	23	(Australia) Michael Caruso	Nissan Motorsport	Nissan Altima L33	2:26.2236	Wet
Practice 6	Saturday	9	(Australia) David Reynolds	Erebus Motorsport	Holden Commodore ZB	2:04.4072	Dry
Warm-Up	Sunday	17	(New Zealand) Scott McLaughlin	DJR Team Penske	Ford Falcon FG X	2:04.9633	Dry

=== Qualifying ===
Pos.	No.	Driver	Team	Car	Time	Gap	Grid
1	1	(Australia) Jamie Whincup	Triple Eight Race Engineering	Holden Commodore ZB	2:04.1093		Top 10
2	9	(Australia) David Reynolds	Erebus Motorsport	Holden Commodore ZB	2:04.2647	+0.1555	Top 10
3	17	(New Zealand) Scott McLaughlin	DJR Team Penske	Ford Falcon FG X	2:04.2861	+0.1769	Top 10
4	97	(New Zealand) Shane van Gisbergen	Triple Eight Race Engineering	Holden Commodore ZB	2:04.3818	+0.2725	Top 10
5	25	(Australia) James Courtney	Walkinshaw Andretti United	Holden Commodore ZB	2:04.4759	+0.3666	Top 10
6	888	(Australia) Craig Lowndes	Triple Eight Race Engineering	Holden Commodore ZB	2:04.5702	+0.4609	Top 10
7	6	(Australia) Cam Waters	Tickford Racing	Ford Falcon FG X	2:04.5794	+0.4701	Top 10
8	8	(Australia) Nick Percat	Brad Jones Racing	Holden Commodore ZB	2:04.6380	+0.5288	Top 10
9	99	(Australia) Anton de Pasquale	Erebus Motorsport	Holden Commodore ZB	2:04.6942	+0.5849	Top 10
10	33	(Australia) Garth Tander	Garry Rogers Motorsport	Holden Commodore ZB	2:04.8567	+0.7474	Top 10
11	55	(Australia) Chaz Mostert	Tickford Racing	Ford Falcon FG X	2:04.9133	+0.8040	11
12	34	(Australia) James Golding	Garry Rogers Motorsport	Holden Commodore ZB	2:04.9719	+0.8627	12
13	7	(New Zealand) Andre Heimgartner	Nissan Motorsport	Nissan Altima L33	2:05.0357	+0.9265	13
14	11	(Australia) Rick Kelly	Nissan Motorsport	Nissan Altima L33	2:05.0644	+0.9552	14
15	12	(New Zealand) Fabian Coulthard	DJR Team Penske	Ford Falcon FG X	2:05.1789	+1.0696	15
16	23	(Australia) Michael Caruso	Nissan Motorsport	Nissan Altima L33	2:05.3195	+1.2102	16
17	56	(New Zealand) Richie Stanaway	Tickford Racing	Ford Falcon FG X	2:05.4607	+1.3514	17
18	2	(Australia) Scott Pye	Walkinshaw Andretti United	Holden Commodore ZB	2:05.4655	+1.3562	18
19	5	(Australia) Mark Winterbottom	Tickford Racing	Ford Falcon FG X	2:05.5106	+1.4013	19
20	14	(Australia) Tim Slade	Brad Jones Racing	Holden Commodore ZB	2:05.5656	+1.4563	20
21	18	(Australia) Lee Holdsworth	Team 18	Holden Commodore ZB	2:05.7075	+1.5982	21
22	21	(Australia) Tim Blanchard	Tim Blanchard Racing	Holden Commodore ZB	2:05.8433	+1.7340	22
23	35	(Australia) Todd Hazelwood	Matt Stone Racing	Holden Commodore VF	2:06.0375	+1.9283	23
24	230	(Australia) Will Davison	23Red Racing	Ford Falcon FG X	2:06.0429	+1.9336	24
25	19	(Australia) Jack Le Brocq	Tekno Autosports	Holden Commodore ZB	2:06.1324	+2.0232	25
26	78	(Switzerland) Simona de Silvestro	Nissan Motorsport	Nissan Altima L33	2:06.4374	+2.3281	26

=== Top 10 Shootout ===
Pos.	No.	Driver	Team	Car	Time	Gap	Grid
1	9	(Australia) David Reynolds	Erebus Motorsport	Holden Commodore ZB	2:04.0589		1
2	1	(Australia) Jamie Whincup	Triple Eight Race Engineering	Holden Commodore ZB	2:04.0683	+0.0094	2
3	99	(Australia) Anton de Pasquale	Erebus Motorsport	Holden Commodore ZB	2:04.3498	+0.2909	3
4	97	(New Zealand) Shane van Gisbergen	Triple Eight Race Engineering	Holden Commodore ZB	2:04.5385	+0.4796	4
5	17	(New Zealand) Scott McLaughlin	DJR Team Penske	Ford Falcon FG X	2:04.5494	+0.4905	5
6	6	(Australia) Cam Waters	Tickford Racing	Ford Falcon FG X	2:04.7517	+0.6928	6
7	8	(Australia) Nick Percat	Brad Jones Racing	Holden Commodore ZB	2:04.7673	+0.7084	7
8	25	(Australia) James Courtney	Walkinshaw Andretti United	Holden Commodore ZB	2:05.0034	+0.9445	8
9	888	(Australia) Craig Lowndes	Triple Eight Race Engineering	Holden Commodore ZB	2:05.0835	+1.0246	9
10	33	(Australia) Garth Tander	Garry Rogers Motorsport	Holden Commodore ZB	2:05.1717	+1.1128	10

=== Race ===
Pos.	No.	Driver	Team	Car	Laps	Time/Retired	Grid	Points
1	888	(Australia) Craig Lowndes (New Zealand) Steven Richards	Triple Eight Race Engineering	Holden Commodore ZB	161	6:01:44.8637	9	300
2	2	(Australia) Scott Pye (Australia) Warren Luff	Walkinshaw Andretti United	Holden Commodore ZB	161	+6.292	18	276
3	17	(New Zealand) Scott McLaughlin (France) Alexandre Prémat	DJR Team Penske	Ford Falcon FG X	161	+9.408	5	258
4	55	(Australia) Chaz Mostert (Australia) James Moffat	Tickford Racing	Ford Falcon FG X	161	+10.253	11	240
5	97	(New Zealand) Shane van Gisbergen (New Zealand) Earl Bamber	Triple Eight Race Engineering	Holden Commodore ZB	161	+27.421	4	222
6	33	(Australia) Garth Tander (New Zealand) Chris Pither	Garry Rogers Motorsport	Holden Commodore ZB	161	+30.010	10	204
7	8	(Australia) Nick Percat (Australia) Macauley Jones	Brad Jones Racing	Holden Commodore ZB	161	+36.542	7	192
8	34	(Australia) James Golding (Australia) Richard Muscat	Garry Rogers Motorsport	Holden Commodore ZB	161	+37.233	12	180
9	12	(New Zealand) Fabian Coulthard (Australia) Tony D'Alberto	DJR Team Penske	Ford Falcon FG X	161	+47.112	15	168
10	1	(Australia) Jamie Whincup (Australia) Paul Dumbrell	Triple Eight Race Engineering	Holden Commodore ZB	161	+56.433	2	156
11	11	(Australia) Rick Kelly (Australia) Garry Jacobson	Nissan Motorsport	Nissan Altima L33	161	+1:19.074	14	144
12	5	(Australia) Mark Winterbottom (Australia) Dean Canto	Tickford Racing	Ford Falcon FG X	161	+1:35.009	19	138
13	9	(Australia) David Reynolds (Australia) Luke Youlden	Erebus Motorsport	Holden Commodore ZB	161	+1:39.105	1	132
14	78	(Switzerland) Simona de Silvestro (Australia) Alex Rullo	Nissan Motorsport	Nissan Altima L33	161	+1:47.776	26	126
15	19	(Australia) Jack Le Brocq (Australia) Jonathon Webb	Tekno Autosports	Holden Commodore ZB	161	+1:52.397	25	120
16	7	(New Zealand) Andre Heimgartner (Australia) Aaren Russell	Nissan Motorsport	Nissan Altima L33	161	+1:54.823	13	114
17	14	(Australia) Tim Slade (Australia) Ashley Walsh	Brad Jones Racing	Holden Commodore ZB	160	+1 lap	20	108
18	21	(Australia) Tim Blanchard (Australia) Dale Wood	Tim Blanchard Racing	Holden Commodore ZB	159	+2 laps	22	102
19	230	(Australia) Will Davison (Australia) Alex Davison	23Red Racing	Ford Falcon FG X	159	+2 laps	24	96
20	35	(Australia) Todd Hazelwood (Australia) Bryce Fullwood	Matt Stone Racing	Holden Commodore VF	159	+2 laps	23	90
21	18	(Australia) Lee Holdsworth (Australia) Jason Bright	Team 18	Holden Commodore ZB	157	+4 laps	21	84
22	56	(New Zealand) Richie Stanaway (Australia) Steve Owen	Tickford Racing	Ford Falcon FG X	152	+9 laps	17	78
23	6	(Australia) Cam Waters (Australia) David Russell	Tickford Racing	Ford Falcon FG X	148	+13 laps	6	72
24	99	(Australia) Anton de Pasquale (Australia) Will Brown	Erebus Motorsport	Holden Commodore ZB	143	+18 laps	3	66
NC	23	(Australia) Michael Caruso (Australia) Dean Fiore	Nissan Motorsport	Nissan Altima L33	69	Accident	16	
NC	25	(Australia) James Courtney (Australia) Jack Perkins	Walkinshaw Andretti United	Holden Commodore ZB	33	Mechanical	8	

== Championship standings ==
Drivers' Championship standings

Pos	Driver	Pts	Gap
1	(New Zealand) Shane van Gisbergen	3276	
2	(New Zealand) Scott McLaughlin	3257	-19
3	(Australia) Jamie Whincup	2872	-404
4	(Australia) Craig Lowndes	2787	-489
5	(Australia) David Reynolds	2567	-709

Teams Championship

	Pos	Team	Pts	Gap
	1	Triple Eight Race Engineering (1, 97)	6117	
	2	DJR Team Penske	5539	-578
	3	Tickford Racing (5, 55)	4066	-2051
1	4	Brad Jones Racing	3921	-2196
1	5	Erebus Motorsport	3886	-2262

Enduro Cup

	Pos	Drivers	Pts	Gap
2	1	(Australia) Craig Lowndes (New Zealand) Steven Richards	558	
	2	(New Zealand) Shane van Gisbergen (New Zealand) Earl Bamber	498	-60
1	3	(New Zealand) Scott McLaughlin (France) Alexandre Prémat	498	-60
2	4	(Australia) Scott Pye (Australia) Warren Luff	480	-78
4	5	(Australia) Jamie Whincup (Australia) Paul Dumbrell	456	-102

- Note: Only the top five positions are included for three sets of standings.

== Broadcast ==
The event telecast was produced by Supercars Media and carried domestically by Fox Sports Australia (via Fox Sports 506), a paid service which covered all sessions including support categories, and Network 10 (via free-to-air channels 10 and 10 Bold), which covered select sessions from midday Friday onwards. The 2018 race was broadcast by Foxtel in 4K resolution, a first for Australian sports.

Fox Sports	Network 10
Host: Jessica Yates, Russell Ingall; Booth: Neil Crompton, Mark Skaife; Pit-lane: Riana Crehan, Andrew Jones, Mark Larkham, Greg Murphy	Presenters: Aaron Noonan, Matthew White; Pundit: Rick Kelly; Roving: Scott MacKinnon, Kate Peck
