= 2017 Supercheap Auto Bathurst 1000 =

Motor race in Australia

(New South Wales) 2017 Supercheap Auto Bathurst 1000
Event Information
- Round 11 of 14 in the 2017 International V8 Supercars Championship
- Layout of the Mount Panorama Circuit
- Date: 5–8 October 2017
- Location: Bathurst, New South Wales
- Venue: Mount Panorama Circuit
- Weather: Showers early before clearing to overcast late.

Results
Race 1
Distance	161 laps	1000 km
Pole position	(New Zealand) Scott McLaughlin; DJR Team Penske	2:03.8312
Winner	(Australia) David Reynolds (Australia) Luke Youlden; Erebus Motorsport	7:11:45.5456

The 2017 Supercheap Auto Bathurst 1000 was a motor racing event for the Supercars Championship, held from October 5 to 8 2017 at the Mount Panorama Circuit in Bathurst, New South Wales, and consisted of a 1000 kilometre race. It was the eleventh event of fourteen in the 2017 Supercars Championship and was Race 20 of the season. It was also the second event of the 2017 Enduro Cup.

DJR Team Penske driver Scott McLaughlin qualified on pole with a lap time of 2:03.8312, the fastest lap of the Mount Panorama Circuit recorded by a Supercar. (Note: David Reynolds is recognised as holding the official lap record for Supercars as his time of 2:06.2769 was set during a race.)

The race was won by David Reynolds and Luke Youlden driving a Holden VF Commodore for Erebus Motorsport.

== Report ==
=== Background ===
The event was the 60th running of the Bathurst 1000, which was first held at the Phillip Island Grand Prix Circuit in 1960 as a 500-mile race for Australian-made standard production sedans, and marked the 57th time that the race was held at Mount Panorama. It was the 21st running of the Australian 1000 race, which was first held after the organisational split between the Australian Racing Drivers Club and V8 Supercars Australia that saw two "Bathurst 1000" races contested in both 1997 and 1998. It was the 19th time the race had been held as part of the Supercars Championship and the fifth time it formed part of the Enduro Cup. The defending winners of the race were Will Davison and Jonathon Webb.

Scott McLaughlin entered the event as the championship leader, 84 points clear of Triple Eight Race Engineering's Jamie Whincup. McLaughlin's DJR Team Penske team-mate Fabian Coulthard was third in the points standings, 161 behind McLaughlin. In the Teams' Championship, DJR Team Penske held a 372-point lead over Triple Eight. In the Enduro Cup standings, Prodrive Racing Australia team-mates Cam Waters and Richie Stanaway led the pairing of McLaughlin and Alexandre Prémat by 24 points.

=== Entry list ===
Twenty-six cars were entered in the event. It was the first time since 2008 that no additional "Wildcard" entries had been received for the race. The race would see the Bathurst 1000 debut of four drivers - Super2 drivers Todd Hazelwood, Richard Muscat and Garry Jacobson and main-game debutant Alex Rullo. Rullo (at 17 years, 4 months and 23 days) would become the fourth youngest Bathurst 1000 starter after Cam Waters (17 years, 2 months and 6 days in 2011), Paul Dumbrell (17 years, 2 months and 14 days in 1999) and Bryan Sala (17 years, 2 months and 15 days in 1991).

No.	Drivers	Team (Sponsor)	Car	No.	Drivers	Team (Sponsor)	Car
02	(Australia) Scott Pye (Australia) Warren Luff	Walkinshaw Racing (Mobil 1)	Holden Commodore VF	21	(Australia) Tim Blanchard (Australia) Todd Hazelwood	Tim Blanchard Racing (CoolDrive)	Holden Commodore VF
3	(Australia) Aaren Russell (Australia) Taz Douglas	Lucas Dumbrell Motorsport (Plus Fitness)	Holden Commodore VF	22	(Australia) James Courtney (Australia) Jack Perkins	Walkinshaw Racing (Boost Mobile)	Holden Commodore VF
5	(Australia) Mark Winterbottom (Australia) Dean Canto	Prodrive Racing Australia (The Bottle-O)	Ford Falcon FG X	23	(Australia) Michael Caruso (Australia) Dean Fiore	Nissan Motorsport (Big4 Holiday Parks)	Nissan Altima L33
6	(Australia) Cam Waters (New Zealand) Richie Stanaway	Prodrive Racing Australia (Monster Energy)	Ford Falcon FG X	33	(Australia) Garth Tander (Australia) James Golding	Garry Rogers Motorsport (Wilson Security)	Holden Commodore VF
8	(Australia) Nick Percat (Australia) Macauley Jones	Brad Jones Racing (Boost Mobile)	Holden Commodore VF	34	(Australia) James Moffat (Australia) Richard Muscat	Garry Rogers Motorsport (Wilson Security)	Holden Commodore VF
9	(Australia) David Reynolds (Australia) Luke Youlden	Erebus Motorsport (Penrite)	Holden Commodore VF	55	(Australia) Chaz Mostert (Australia) Steve Owen	Rod Nash Racing (Supercheap Auto)	Ford Falcon FG X
12	(New Zealand) Fabian Coulthard (Australia) Tony D'Alberto	DJR Team Penske (Shell V-Power)	Ford Falcon FG X	56	(Australia) Jason Bright (Australia) Garry Jacobson	Britek Motorsport (Mega Bulk Fuels)	Ford Falcon FG X
14	(Australia) Tim Slade (Australia) Ashley Walsh^{1}	Brad Jones Racing (Freightliner)	Holden Commodore VF	62	(Australia) Alex Rullo (Australia) Alex Davison	Lucas Dumbrell Motorsport (Repair Management Australia)	Holden Commodore VF
15	(Australia) Rick Kelly (Australia) David Wall	Nissan Motorsport (Sengled)	Nissan Altima L33	78	(Switzerland) Simona de Silvestro (Australia) David Russell	Nissan Motorsport (Harvey Norman)	Nissan Altima L33
17	(New Zealand) Scott McLaughlin (France) Alexandre Prémat	DJR Team Penske (Shell V-Power)	Ford Falcon FG X	88	(Australia) Jamie Whincup (Australia) Paul Dumbrell	Triple Eight Race Engineering (Red Bull, Holden)	Holden Commodore VF
18	(Australia) Lee Holdsworth (Australia) Karl Reindler	Team 18 (Preston Hire)	Holden Commodore VF	97	(New Zealand) Shane van Gisbergen (Australia) Matt Campbell	Triple Eight Race Engineering (Red Bull, Holden)	Holden Commodore VF
19	(Australia) Will Davison (Australia) Jonathon Webb	Tekno Autosports (Woodstock Bourbon)	Holden Commodore VF	99	(Australia) Dale Wood (New Zealand) Chris Pither	Erebus Motorsport (ADVAM, GB Galvanising)	Holden Commodore VF
20	(Australia) Todd Kelly (Australia) Jack Le Brocq	Nissan Motorsport (carsales.com)	Nissan Altima L33	888	(Australia) Craig Lowndes (New Zealand) Steven Richards	Triple Eight Race Engineering (Caltex)	Holden Commodore VF

Notes

- ^1 — following Practice 3 Ashley Walsh was replaced by Andre Heimgartner due to injury.

=== Practice ===
Three one-hour practice sessions were held on the Thursday prior to the race. Practice 1 and Practice 3 were open to both regular drivers and co-drivers, while Practice 2 was for co-drivers only. The first session saw Mostert set the fastest lap time of 2:06.3033. Lowndes was second fastest, six hundredths behind while Todd Kelly was sixteen hundredths further back. Tim Slade caused a red flag as a result of losing control in the Esses before heavily impacting the wall on the entry to the Dipper. The session was halted again with nineteen minutes remaining after Alex Rullo stopped on Conrod Straight having found the wall at Forrest's Elbow.

== Results ==
=== Practice ===
Session	No.	Driver	Team	Car	Time
Thursday
Practice 1	55	(Australia) Chaz Mostert	Rod Nash Racing	Ford FG X Falcon	2:06.3032
Practice 2	5	(Australia) Dean Canto	Prodrive Racing Australia	Ford FG X Falcon	2:06.3268
Practice 3	9	(Australia) David Reynolds	Erebus Motorsport	Holden VF Commodore	2:05.0931
Friday
Practice 4	5	(Australia) Dean Canto	Prodrive Racing Australia	Ford FG X Falcon	2:05.3368
Practice 5	17	(New Zealand) Scott McLaughlin	DJR Team Penske	Ford FG X Falcon	2:04.1470
Saturday
Practice 6	9	(Australia) David Reynolds	Erebus Motorsport	Holden VF Commodore	2:04.9948
Sunday
Warm-Up	18	(Australia) Lee Holdsworth	Team 18	Holden VF Commodore	2:06.3375

=== Qualifying ===
Pos.	No.	Driver	Team	Car	Time	Gap	Grid
1	17	(New Zealand) Scott McLaughlin	DJR Team Penske	Ford FG X Falcon	2:04.2253		Top 10
2	9	(Australia) David Reynolds	Erebus Motorsport	Holden VF Commodore	2:04.4730	+0.2476	Top 10
3	55	(Australia) Chaz Mostert	Rod Nash Racing	Ford FG X Falcon	2:04.5304	+0.3050	Top 10
4	6	(Australia) Cam Waters	Prodrive Racing Australia	Ford FG X Falcon	2:04.5958	+0.3704	Top 10
5	5	(Australia) Mark Winterbottom	Prodrive Racing Australia	Ford FG X Falcon	2:04.7857	+0.5603	Top 10
6	12	(New Zealand) Fabian Coulthard	DJR Team Penske	Ford FG X Falcon	2:04.8955	+0.6701	Top 10
7	97	(New Zealand) Shane van Gisbergen	Triple Eight Race Engineering	Holden VF Commodore	2:05.0224	+0.7971	Top 10
8	22	(Australia) James Courtney	Walkinshaw Racing	Holden VF Commodore	2:05.0417	+0.8163	Top 10
9	56	(Australia) Jason Bright	Britek Motorsport	Ford FG X Falcon	2:05.0803	+0.8550	Top 10
10	33	(Australia) Garth Tander	Garry Rogers Motorsport	Holden VF Commodore	2:05.1093	+0.8840	Top 10
11	88	(Australia) Jamie Whincup	Triple Eight Race Engineering	Holden VF Commodore	2:05.1686	+0.9432	11
12	15	(Australia) Rick Kelly	Nissan Motorsport	Nissan L33 Altima	2:05.1996	+0.9742	12
13	23	(Australia) Michael Caruso	Nissan Motorsport	Nissan L33 Altima	2:05.2503	+1.0249	13
14	8	(Australia) Nick Percat	Brad Jones Racing	Holden VF Commodore	2:05.2846	+1.0592	14
15	20	(Australia) Todd Kelly	Nissan Motorsport	Nissan L33 Altima	2:05.2974	+1.0720	15
16	19	(Australia) Will Davison	Tekno Autosports	Holden VF Commodore	2:05.3840	+1.1586	16
17	18	(Australia) Lee Holdsworth	Team 18	Holden VF Commodore	2:05.4379	+1.2125	17
18	14	(Australia) Tim Slade	Brad Jones Racing	Holden VF Commodore	2:05.5562	+1.3308	18
19	888	(Australia) Craig Lowndes	Triple Eight Race Engineering	Holden VF Commodore	2:05.5625	+1.3371	19
20	02	(Australia) Scott Pye	Walkinshaw Racing	Holden VF Commodore	2:05.6182	+1.3928	20
21	99	(Australia) Dale Wood	Erebus Motorsport	Holden VF Commodore	2:05.6414	+1.4160	21
22	34	(Australia) James Moffat	Garry Rogers Motorsport	Holden VF Commodore	2:05.6430^{1}	+1.4176	22
23	78	(Switzerland) Simona de Silvestro	Nissan Motorsport	Nissan L33 Altima	2:05.9423	+1.7169	23
24	21	(Australia) Tim Blanchard	Tim Blanchard Racing	Holden VF Commodore	2:05.9702	+1.7449	24
25	3	(Australia) Aaren Russell	Lucas Dumbrell Motorsport	Holden VF Commodore	2:06.4233	+2.1979	25
26	62	(Australia) Alex Rullo	Lucas Dumbrell Motorsport	Holden VF Commodore	2:07.4800	+3.2547	26

Notes

- ^1 — James Moffat had his fastest lap time invalidated for causing a red flag.

=== Top 10 Shootout ===
Pos.	No.	Driver	Team	Car	Time	Gap	Grid
1	17	(New Zealand) Scott McLaughlin	DJR Team Penske	Ford FG X Falcon	2:03.8312		1
2	9	(Australia) David Reynolds	Erebus Motorsport	Holden VF Commodore	2:04.2746	+0.4434	2
3	5	(Australia) Mark Winterbottom	Prodrive Racing Australia	Ford FG X Falcon	2:04.4988	+0.6676	3
4	55	(Australia) Chaz Mostert	Rod Nash Racing	Ford FG X Falcon	2:04.5875	+0.7563	4
5	97	(New Zealand) Shane van Gisbergen	Triple Eight Race Engineering	Holden VF Commodore	2:04.6688	+0.8376	5
6	6	(Australia) Cam Waters	Prodrive Racing Australia	Ford FG X Falcon	2:04.6802	+0.8490	6
7	12	(New Zealand) Fabian Coulthard	DJR Team Penske	Ford FG X Falcon	2:04.9693	+1.1381	7
8	56	(Australia) Jason Bright	Britek Motorsport	Ford FG X Falcon	2:05.2277	+1.3965	8
9	33	(Australia) Garth Tander	Garry Rogers Motorsport	Holden VF Commodore	2:05.3261	+1.4949	9
10	22	(Australia) James Courtney	Walkinshaw Racing	Holden VF Commodore	2:05.4890	+1.6578	10

=== Race 20 ===
Pos.	No.	Driver	Team	Car	Laps	Time/Retired	Grid	Points
1	9	(Australia) David Reynolds (Australia) Luke Youlden	Erebus Motorsport	Holden VF Commodore	161	7:11:45.5456	2	300
2	02	(Australia) Scott Pye (Australia) Warren Luff	Walkinshaw Racing	Holden VF Commodore	161	+3.8995	20	276
3	12	(New Zealand) Fabian Coulthard (Australia) Tony D'Alberto	DJR Team Penske	Ford FG X Falcon	161	+4.5913	7	258
4	99	(Australia) Dale Wood (New Zealand) Chris Pither	Erebus Motorsport	Holden VF Commodore	161	+6.3450	21	240
5	97	(New Zealand) Shane van Gisbergen (Australia) Matt Campbell	Triple Eight Race Engineering	Holden VF Commodore	161	+10.6260	5	222
6	23	(Australia) Michael Caruso (Australia) Dean Fiore	Nissan Motorsport	Nissan L33 Altima	161	+13.6874	13	204
7	20	(Australia) Todd Kelly (Australia) Jack Le Brocq	Nissan Motorsport	Nissan L33 Altima	161	+24.3004	15	192
8	56	(Australia) Jason Bright (Australia) Garry Jacobson	Britek Motorsport	Ford FG X Falcon	161	+28.1647	8	180
9	14	(Australia) Tim Slade (New Zealand) Andre Heimgartner	Brad Jones Racing	Holden VF Commodore	161	+29.6276	18	168
10	55	(Australia) Chaz Mostert (Australia) Steve Owen	Rod Nash Racing	Ford FG X Falcon	161	+59.3060	4	156
11	888	(Australia) Craig Lowndes (New Zealand) Steven Richards	Triple Eight Race Engineering	Holden VF Commodore	160	+1 Lap	19	144
12	21	(Australia) Tim Blanchard (Australia) Todd Hazelwood	Tim Blanchard Racing	Holden VF Commodore	160	+1 Lap	24	138
13	15	(Australia) Rick Kelly (Australia) David Wall	Nissan Motorsport	Nissan L33 Altima	159	+2 Laps	12	132
14	19	(Australia) Will Davison (Australia) Jonathon Webb	Tekno Autosports	Holden VF Commodore	159	+2 Laps	16	126
15	62	(Australia) Alex Rullo (Australia) Alex Davison	Lucas Dumbrell Motorsport	Holden VF Commodore	159	+2 Laps	26	120
16	6	(Australia) Cam Waters (New Zealand) Richie Stanaway	Prodrive Racing Australia	Ford FG X Falcon	159	+2 Laps	6	114
17	3	(Australia) Aaren Russell (Australia) Taz Douglas	Lucas Dumbrell Motorsport	Holden VF Commodore	154	+7 Laps	25	108
18	33	(Australia) Garth Tander (Australia) James Golding	Garry Rogers Motorsport	Holden VF Commodore	152	+9 Laps	9	102
19	22	(Australia) James Courtney (Australia) Jack Perkins	Walkinshaw Racing	Holden VF Commodore	147	+14 Laps	10	96
20	88	(Australia) Jamie Whincup (Australia) Paul Dumbrell	Triple Eight Race Engineering	Holden VF Commodore	124	+37 Laps	11	90
Ret	8	(Australia) Nick Percat (Australia) Macauley Jones	Brad Jones Racing	Holden VF Commodore	160	Accident	14	
Ret	5	(Australia) Mark Winterbottom (Australia) Dean Canto	Prodrive Racing Australia	Ford FG X Falcon	159	Accident	3	
Ret	78	(Switzerland) Simona de Silvestro (Australia) David Russell	Nissan Motorsport	Nissan L33 Altima	152	Accident	23	
Ret	34	(Australia) James Moffat (Australia) Richard Muscat	Garry Rogers Motorsport	Holden VF Commodore	141	Accident	22	
Ret	18	(Australia) Lee Holdsworth (Australia) Karl Reindler	Team 18	Holden VF Commodore	76	Engine	17	
Ret	17	(New Zealand) Scott McLaughlin (France) Alexandre Prémat	DJR Team Penske	Ford FG X Falcon	74	Engine	1	

== Standings after the event ==
Drivers Championship

Pos	Driver	Pts	Gap
1	(New Zealand) Fabian Coulthard	2431	
2	(Australia) Jamie Whincup	2340	+91
3	(New Zealand) Scott McLaughlin	2334	+97
4	(Australia) Chaz Mostert	2208	+223
5	(New Zealand) Shane van Gisbergen	2142	+289

Teams Championship

Pos	Team	Pts	Gap
1	DJR Team Penske	4800	
2	Triple Eight Race Engineering (88, 97)	4482	+318
3	Prodrive Racing Australia	3384	+1416
4	Garry Rogers Motorsport	2937	+1863
5	Erebus Motorsport	2808	+1992

Enduro Cup

Pos	Drivers	Pts	Gap
1	(New Zealand) Fabian Coulthard (Australia) Tony D'Alberto	480	
2	(Australia) Cam Waters (New Zealand) Richie Stanaway	444	+36
3	(Australia) Chaz Mostert (Australia) Steve Owen	414	+66
4	(Australia) David Reynolds (Australia) Luke Youlden	408	+72
5	(Australia) Dale Wood (New Zealand) Chris Pither	372	+108

- Note: Only the top five positions are included for both sets of standings.

== Broadcast ==
The event telecast was produced by Supercars Media and carried domestically by Fox Sports Australia (via Fox Sports 506), a paid service which covered all sessions including support categories, and Network 10 (via free-to-air channels 10 and 10 Bold), which covered select sessions from midday Friday onwards. The coverage won a Logie in 2018 for Most Outstanding Sports Coverage.

Fox Sports	Network 10
Host: Jessica Yates, Russell Ingall; Booth: Neil Crompton, Mark Skaife; Pit-lane: Riana Crehan, Greg Murphy, Greg Rust	Presenters: Aaron Noonan, Matthew White; Pundits: Rick Kelly, Mark Larkham; Roving: Scott MacKinnon, Kate Peck
