= 2017 Clipsal 500 Adelaide =

2017 V8 Supercar championship race

(South Australia) 2017 Clipsal 500 Adelaide
Event Information
- Round 1 of 14 in the 2017 Supercars Championship
- Layout of the Adelaide Street Circuit
- Date: 3–5 March 2017
- Location: Adelaide, South Australia
- Venue: Adelaide Street Circuit

Results
Race 1
Distance	78 laps	250 km
Pole position	Shane van Gisbergen; Triple Eight Race Engineering	1:19.5723
Winner	Shane van Gisbergen; Triple Eight Race Engineering	1:49:25.850
Race 2
Distance	78 laps	250 km
Pole position	Shane van Gisbergen; Triple Eight Race Engineering	1:19.7545
Winner	Shane van Gisbergen; Triple Eight Race Engineering	1:47:18.860

The 2017 Clipsal 500 Adelaide was a motor racing event for Supercars that was held on the weekend of 3 to 5 March 2017. The event was run at the Adelaide Street Circuit in Adelaide, South Australia, and was the nineteenth running of the Adelaide 500. It was the first event of fourteen in the 2017 Supercars Championship and consisted of two races of 250 kilometres. It was to be the last time Clipsal would be title sponsor for the event, having been so since 2000.

Shane van Gisbergen won both 250 kilometres races.

== Report ==
=== Background ===
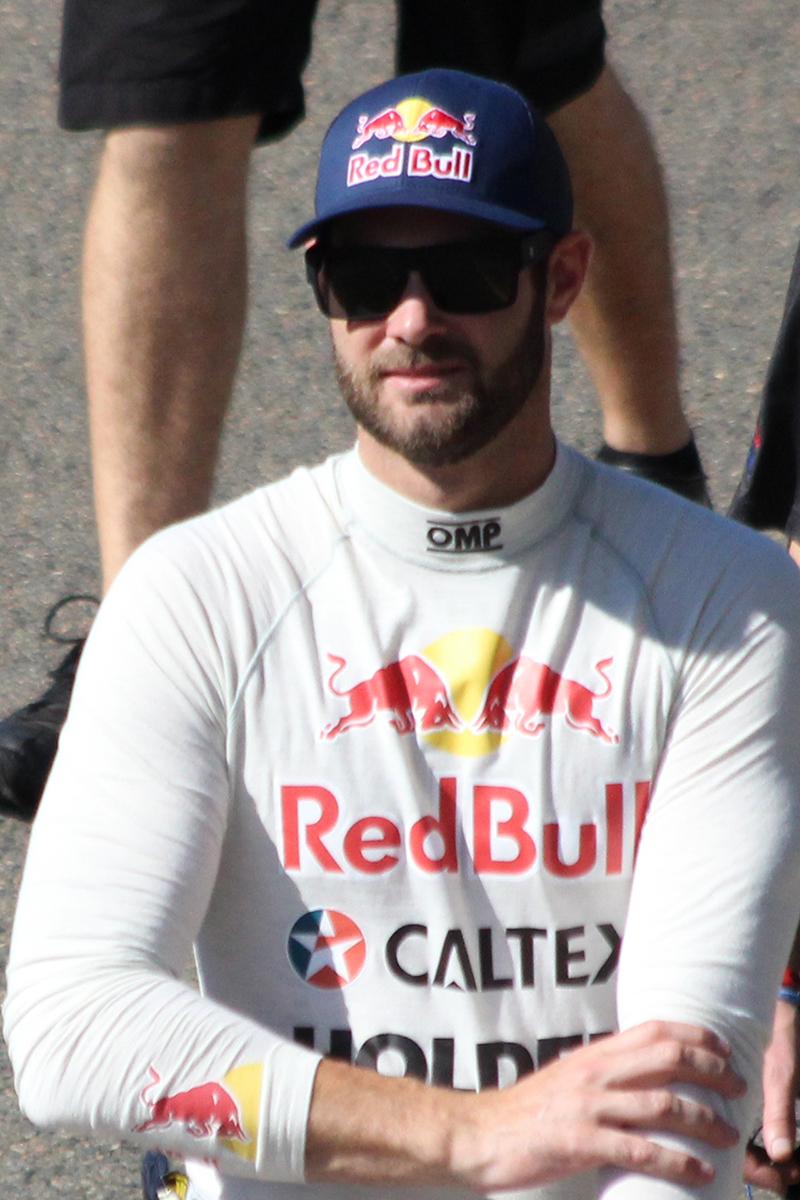
Defending Series Champion Shane van Gisbergen won the 2017 event.

The event reverted to the two-race format last used in 2013, with organisers citing the format's popularity as the reason for its reintroduction. The top ten shootout will also be re-introduced for qualifying for the Saturday race.

=== Practice ===
Practice summary
Session	Day	Fastest lap				
Session	Day	No.	Driver	Team	Car	Time
Practice 1	Friday	88	(Australia) Jamie Whincup	Triple Eight Race Engineering	Holden VF Commodore	1:20.4006
Practice 2	Friday	17	(New Zealand) Scott McLaughlin	DJR Team Penske	Ford FG X Falcon	1:19.8355
Practice 3	Saturday	88	(Australia) Jamie Whincup	Triple Eight Race Engineering	Holden VF Commodore	1:19.7649

=== Race 1 ===
==== Qualifying ====
Pos.	No.	Name	Team	Car	Time
1	97	(New Zealand) Shane van Gisbergen	Triple Eight Race Engineering	Holden VF Commodore	1:19.7806
2	17	(New Zealand) Scott McLaughlin	DJR Team Penske	Ford FG X Falcon	1:19.7807
3	15	(Australia) Rick Kelly	Nissan Motorsport	Nissan Altima L33	1:19.8607
4	22	(Australia) James Courtney	Walkinshaw Racing	Holden VF Commodore	1:19.8670
5	55	(Australia) Chaz Mostert	Rod Nash Racing	Ford FG X Falcon	1:19.8676
6	12	(New Zealand) Fabian Coulthard	DJR Team Penske	Ford FG X Falcon	1:19.8908
7	88	(Australia) Jamie Whincup	Triple Eight Race Engineering	Holden VF Commodore	1:19.8969
8	5	(Australia) Mark Winterbottom	Prodrive Racing Australia	Ford FG X Falcon	1:20.0565
9	6	(Australia) Cam Waters	Prodrive Racing Australia	Ford FG X Falcon	1:20.0566
10	9	(Australia) David Reynolds	Erebus Motorsport	Holden VF Commodore	1:20.1050
11	8	(Australia) Nick Percat	Brad Jones Racing	Holden VF Commodore	1:20.1235
12	14	(Australia) Tim Slade	Brad Jones Racing	Holden VF Commodore	1:20.1747
13	888	(Australia) Craig Lowndes	Triple Eight Race Engineering	Holden VF Commodore	1:20.2137
14	23	(Australia) Michael Caruso	Nissan Motorsport	Nissan Altima L33	1:20.2461
15	33	(Australia) Garth Tander	Garry Rogers Motorsport	Holden VF Commodore	1:20.2585
16	7	(Australia) Todd Kelly	Nissan Motorsport	Nissan Altima L33	1:20.2618
17	19	(Australia) Will Davison	Tekno Autosports	Holden VF Commodore	1:20.2802
18	2	(Australia) Scott Pye	Walkinshaw Racing	Holden VF Commodore	1:20.3479
19	34	(Australia) James Moffat	Garry Rogers Motorsport	Holden VF Commodore	1:20.4186
20	18	(Australia) Lee Holdsworth	Team 18	Holden VF Commodore	1:20.4696
21	96	(Australia) Dale Wood	Erebus Motorsport	Holden VF Commodore	1:20.6664
22	56	(Australia) Jason Bright	Britek Motorsport	Ford FG X Falcon	1:20.8057
23	21	(Australia) Tim Blanchard	Tim Blanchard Racing	Holden VF Commodore	1:20.8376
24	78	(Switzerland) Simona de Silvestro	Nissan Motorsport	Nissan Altima L33	1:21.1722
25	3	(Australia) Taz Douglas	Lucas Dumbrell Motorsport	Holden VF Commodore	1:22.1247
26	62	(Australia) Alex Rullo	Lucas Dumbrell Motorsport	Holden VF Commodore	1:23.0244

==== Top 10 Shootout, Race 1 ====
Pos.	No.	Name	Team	Car	Time
1	97	(New Zealand) Shane van Gisbergen	Triple Eight Race Engineering	Holden VF Commodore	1:19.5723
2	12	(New Zealand) Fabian Coulthard	DJR Team Penske	Ford FG X Falcon	+0.0442
3	55	(Australia) Chaz Mostert	Prodrive Racing Australia	Ford FG X Falcon	+0.2964
4	22	(Australia) James Courtney	Walkinshaw Racing	Holden VF Commodore	+0.4209
5	5	(Australia) Mark Winterbottom	Prodrive Racing Australia	Ford FG X Falcon	+0.4453
6	17	(New Zealand) Scott McLaughlin	DJR Team Penske	Ford FG X Falcon	+0.4851
7	88	(Australia) Jamie Whincup	Triple Eight Race Engineering	Holden VF Commodore	+0.5881
8	15	(Australia) Rick Kelly	Nissan Motorsport	Nissan L33 Altima	+0.7821
9	6	(Australia) Cam Waters	Prodrive Racing Australia	Ford FG X Falcon	+0.8062
10	9	(Australia) David Reynolds	Erebus Motorsport	Holden VF Commodore	+0.9106

==== Race 1 ====
Pos.	No.	Driver	Team	Laps	Time/retired	Grid	Points
1	97	(New Zealand) Shane van Gisbergen	Triple Eight Race Engineering	78	1:49:25.850	1	150
2	12	(New Zealand) Fabian Coulthard	DJR Team Penske	78	+ 14.712 s	2	138
3	22	(Australia) James Courtney	Walkinshaw Racing	78	+ 15.560 s	4	129
4	6	(Australia) Cam Waters	Prodrive Racing Australia	78	+ 22.878 s	9	120
5	15	(Australia) Rick Kelly	Nissan Motorsport	78	+ 23.419 s	8	111
6	88	(Australia) Jamie Whincup	Triple Eight Race Engineering	78	+ 24.224 s	7	102
7	8	(Australia) Nick Percat	Brad Jones Racing	78	+ 28.907 s	11	96
8	888	(Australia) Craig Lowndes	Triple Eight Race Engineering	78	+ 32.755 s	13	90
9	55	(Australia) Chaz Mostert	Rod Nash Racing	78	+ 33.881 s	3	84
10	34	(Australia) James Moffat	Garry Rogers Motorsport	78	+ 35.206 s	19	78
11	23	(Australia) Michael Caruso	Nissan Motorsport	78	+ 37.150 s	14	72
12	33	(Australia) Garth Tander	Garry Rogers Motorsport	78	+ 38.348 s	15	69
13	18	(Australia) Lee Holdsworth	Team 18	78	+ 39.385 s	20	66
14	14	(Australia) Tim Slade	Brad Jones Racing	78	+ 42.353 s	12	63
15	5	(Australia) Mark Winterbottom	Prodrive Racing Australia	78	+ 44.548 s	5	60
16	2	(Australia) Scott Pye	Walkinshaw Racing	78	+ 46.226 s	18	57
17	17	(New Zealand) Scott McLaughlin	DJR Team Penske	78	+ 47.335 s	6	54
18	9	(Australia) David Reynolds	Erebus Motorsport	78	+ 57.306 s	10	51
19	21	(Australia) Tim Blanchard	Tim Blanchard Racing	78	+ 1:09.584 s	23	48
20	78	(Switzerland) Simona de Silvestro	Nissan Motorsport	78	+ 1:16.814 s	24	45
21	56	(Australia) Jason Bright	Britek Motorsport	77	+1 lap	22	42
22	7	(Australia) Todd Kelly	Nissan Motorsport	77	+ 1 lap	16	39
23	62	(Australia) Alex Rullo	Lucas Dumbrell Motorsport	76	+ 2 laps	26	36
24	3	(Australia) Taz Douglas	Lucas Dumbrell Motorsport	64	+ 14 laps	25	33
Ret	99	(Australia) Dale Wood	Erebus Motorsport	49	Gearbox	21	
Ret	19	(Australia) Will Davison	Tekno Autosports	1	Accident	17	

=== Race 2 ===
==== Qualifying ====
Pos.	No.	Name	Team	Car	Time
1	97	(New Zealand) Shane van Gisbergen	Triple Eight Race Engineering	Holden VF Commodore	1:19.2951
2	88	(Australia) Jamie Whincup	Triple Eight Race Engineering	Holden VF Commodore	1:19.3335
3	12	(New Zealand) Fabian Coulthard	DJR Team Penske	Ford FG X Falcon	1:19.4786
4	17	(New Zealand) Scott McLaughlin	DJR Team Penske	Ford FG X Falcon	1:19.4976
5	55	(Australia) Chaz Mostert	Rod Nash Racing	Ford FG X Falcon	1:19.5437
6	22	(Australia) James Courtney	Walkinshaw Racing	Holden VF Commodore	1:19.6258
7	8	(Australia) Nick Percat	Brad Jones Racing	Holden VF Commodore	1:19.6263
8	14	(Australia) Tim Slade	Brad Jones Racing	Holden VF Commodore	1:19.6992
9	6	(Australia) Cam Waters	Prodrive Racing Australia	Ford FG X Falcon	1:19.7921
10	33	(Australia) Garth Tander	Garry Rogers Motorsport	Holden VF Commodore	1:19.8310
11	2	(Australia) Scott Pye	Walkinshaw Racing	Holden VF Commodore	1:19.8784
12	5	(Australia) Mark Winterbottom	Prodrive Racing Australia	Ford FG X Falcon	1:19.9038
13	23	(Australia) Michael Caruso	Nissan Motorsport	Nissan Altima L33	1:19.9154
14	34	(Australia) James Moffat	Garry Rogers Motorsport	Holden VF Commodore	1:19.9162
15	888	(Australia) Craig Lowndes	Triple Eight Race Engineering	Holden VF Commodore	1:19.9174
16	7	(Australia) Todd Kelly	Nissan Motorsport	Nissan Altima L33	1:19.9181
17	9	(Australia) David Reynolds	Erebus Motorsport	Holden VF Commodore	1:19.9832
18	56	(Australia) Jason Bright	Britek Motorsport	Ford FG X Falcon	1:19.9993
19	15	(Australia) Rick Kelly	Nissan Motorsport	Nissan Altima L33	1:20.0261
20	19	(Australia) Will Davison	Tekno Autosports	Holden VF Commodore	1:20.1834
21	99	(Australia) Dale Wood	Erebus Motorsport	Holden VF Commodore	1:20.3248
22	18	(Australia) Lee Holdsworth	Team 18	Holden VF Commodore	1:20.4047
23	21	(Australia) Tim Blanchard	Tim Blanchard Racing	Holden VF Commodore	1:20.5835
24	3	(Australia) Taz Douglas	Lucas Dumbrell Motorsport	Holden VF Commodore	1:20.9970
24	78	(Switzerland) Simona de Silvestro	Nissan Motorsport	Nissan Altima L33	1:21.2249
26	62	(Australia) Alex Rullo	Lucas Dumbrell Motorsport	Holden VF Commodore	1:21.8345

==== Top 10 Shootout, Race 2 ====
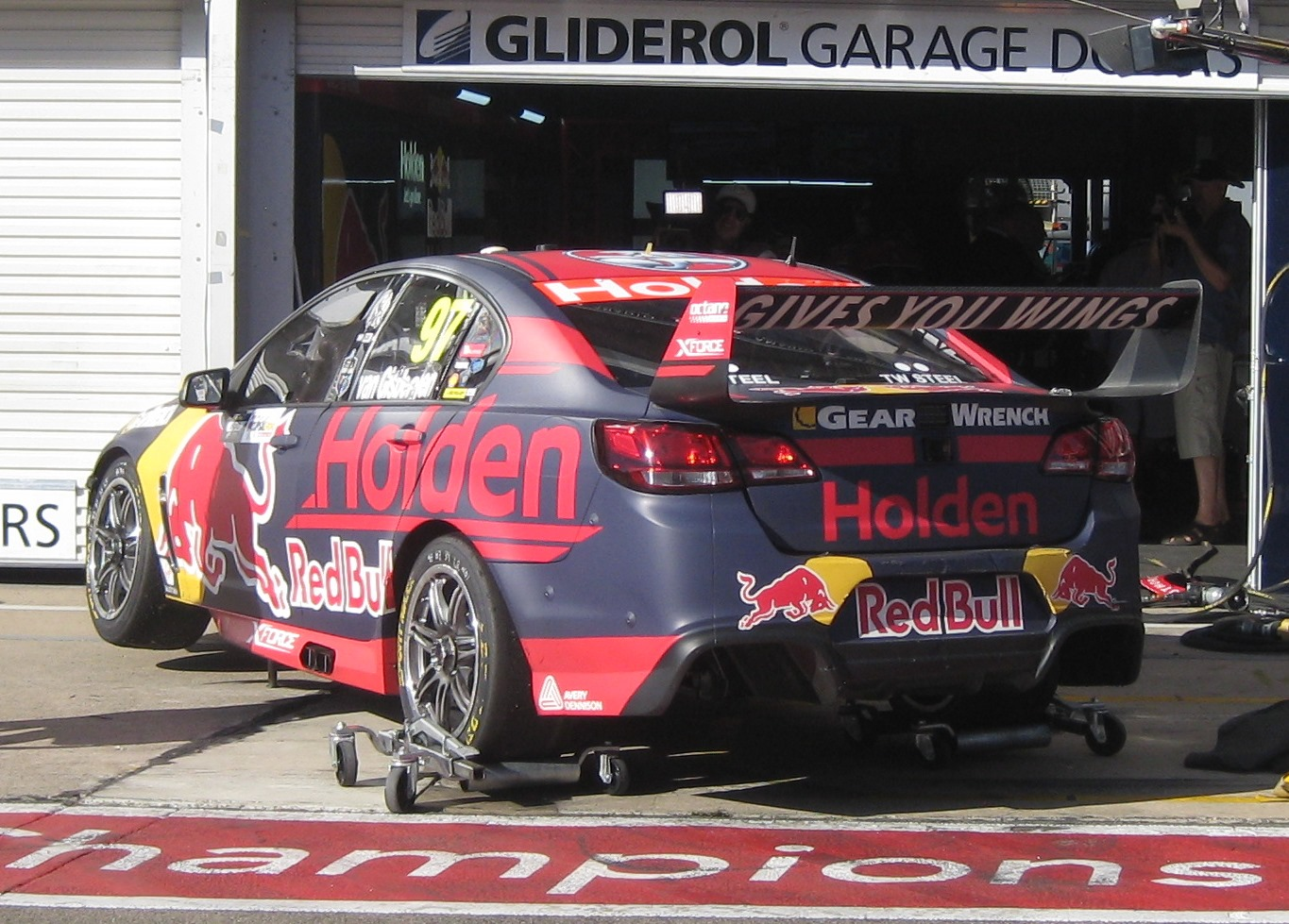
Shane van Gisbergen placed first in the Top 10 Shootout for Race 2 driving a Holden Commodore VF

Pos.	No.	Name	Team	Car	Time
1	97	(New Zealand) Shane van Gisbergen	Triple Eight Race Engineering	Holden VF Commodore	1:19.7544
2	12	(New Zealand) Fabian Coulthard	DJR Team Penske	Ford FG X Falcon	+0.0271
3	17	(New Zealand) Scott McLaughlin	DJR Team Penske	Ford FG X Falcon	+0.1306
4	55	(Australia) Chaz Mostert	Prodrive Racing Australia	Ford FG X Falcon	+0.4691
5	22	(Australia) James Courtney	Walkinshaw Racing	Holden VF Commodore	+0.5029
6	8	(Australia) Nick Percat	Brad Jones Racing	Holden VF Commodore	+0.6592
7	6	(Australia) Cam Waters	Prodrive Racing Australia	Ford FG X Falcon	+0.9845
8	33	(Australia) Garth Tander	Garry Rogers Motorsport	Holden VF Commodore	+0.9973
9	14	(Australia) Tim Slade	Brad Jones Racing	Holden VF Commodore	+33.2215
DSQ	88	(Australia) Jamie Whincup	Triple Eight Race Engineering	Holden VF Commodore	

==== Race 2 ====
Pos.	No.	Driver	Team	Laps	Time/retired	Grid	Points
1	97	(New Zealand) Shane van Gisbergen	Triple Eight Race Engineering	78	1:47:18.860	1	150
2	17	(New Zealand) Scott McLaughlin	DJR Team Penske	78	+ 10.123 s	3	138
3	55	(Australia) Chaz Mostert	Rod Nash Racing	78	+ 19.544 s	4	129
4	22	(Australia) James Courtney	Walkinshaw Racing	78	+ 21.188 s	5	120
5	12	(New Zealand) Fabian Coulthard	DJR Team Penske	78	+ 29.518 s	2	111
6	88	(Australia) Jamie Whincup	Triple Eight Race Engineering	78	+ 31.419 s	10	102
7	14	(Australia) Tim Slade	Brad Jones Racing	78	+ 33.869 s	9	96
8	6	(Australia) Cam Waters	Prodrive Racing Australia	78	+ 40.679 s	7	90
9	7	(Australia) Todd Kelly	Nissan Motorsport	78	+ 42.194 s	16	84
10	888	(Australia) Craig Lowndes	Triple Eight Race Engineering	78	+ 43.771 s	15	78
11	33	(Australia) Garth Tander	Garry Rogers Motorsport	78	+ 44.785 s	8	72
12	9	(Australia) David Reynolds	Erebus Motorsport	78	+ 45.308 s	17	69
13	19	(Australia) Will Davison	Tekno Autosports	78	+ 52.546 s	20	66
14	5	(Australia) Mark Winterbottom	Prodrive Racing Australia	78	+ 55.183 s	11	63
15	56	(Australia) Jason Bright	Britek Motorsport	78	+ 56.043 s	18	60
16	34	(Australia) James Moffat	Garry Rogers Motorsport	78	+ 56.763 s	14	57
17	15	(Australia) Rick Kelly	Nissan Motorsport	78	+ 59.076 s	19	54
18	18	(Australia) Lee Holdsworth	Team 18	78	+ 59.859 s	22	51
19	2	(Australia) Scott Pye	Walkinshaw Racing	78	+ 1:16.973 s	13^{1}	48
20	99	(Australia) Dale Wood	Erebus Motorsport	78	+ 1:17.588 s	21	45
21	21	(Australia) Tim Blanchard	Tim Blanchard Racing	77	+ 1 lap	23	42
22	23	(Australia) Michael Caruso	Nissan Motorsport	77	+ 1 lap	12	39
23	78	(Switzerland) Simona de Silvestro	Nissan Motorsport	77	+ 1 lap	26^{2}	36
24	3	(Australia) Taz Douglas	Lucas Dumbrell Motorsport	76	+ 2 laps	24	33
25	62	(Australia) Alex Rullo	Lucas Dumbrell Motorsport	75	+ 3 laps	25	30
Ret	8	(Australia) Nick Percat	Brad Jones Racing		Accident	6	

Notes:

- ^1 — Scott Pye received a two-place grid penalty for impeding Jason Bright during qualifying for Race 2.
- ^2 — Simona de Silvestro received a two-place grid penalty for impeding Nick Percat during qualifying for Race 2. However, due to the fact that the offending driver could only be moved down one grid spot, the remainder of the penalty will be served at the next championship round, the 2017 Tyrepower Tasmania SuperSprint.

== Championship standings after the event ==
- After Race 2 of 26. Only the top five positions are included for both sets of standings.

Drivers' Championship standings

Pos.	Driver	Points
1	(New Zealand) Shane van Gisbergen	300
2	(New Zealand) Fabian Coulthard	249
3	(Australia) James Courtney	249
4	(Australia) Chaz Mostert	213
5	(Australia) Cam Waters	210

Teams' Championship standings

Pos.	Constructor	Points
1	Triple Eight Race Engineering	504
2	DJR Team Penske	441
3	Walkinshaw Racing	354
4	Prodrive Racing Australia	333
5	Nissan Motorsport (#7 and #15)	288
