= Blanchard Racing Team =

Australian motor racing team

- Manufacturer: Ford
- Team Principal: Tim Blanchard
- Team Manager: Kate Harrington
- Race Drivers: Supercars: 3. Aaron Cameron; 7. James Golding; Super2: 33. Bailey Sweeny; 43. Lochie Dalton
- Race Engineers: Supercars: 3. Daniel Veronese; 7. Tony Woodward; Super2: 33. Brian Cottee; 43. Rhys Lenergan
- Chassis: Supercars: Mustang GT S650; Super2: Mustang GT S550
- Debut: 2017
- Drivers' Championships: 0
- Round wins: 0
- 2023 position: 0
- 13th

Blanchard Racing Team is an Australian motor racing team, currently competing in the Supercars Championship. The team currently runs a pair of Ford Mustang GT's for Aaron Cameron and James Golding.

== History ==
=== Customer Team ===
Tim Blanchard Racing was formed at the end of the 2016 season when Tim Blanchard purchased a Racing Entitlements Contract (REC) from Super Black Racing with the aim of continuing in the Supercars Championship, after the Britek Motorsport REC that had underpinned Blanchard's entry was taken by owner Jason Bright to Prodrive Racing Australia. Brad Jones Racing maintained the running of the entry. In 2018, the team upgraded to the Holden ZB Commodore.

After Blanchard retired from full time driving at the end of 2018, Macauley Jones took over the driving. For 2020, the team's race number was changed from No. 21 to No. 3.

=== Stand Alone Team ===
In 2021, after four seasons running as a satellite team of Brad Jones Racing, the team was renamed to Blanchard Racing Team and switched to a ex-23Red Racing/Tickford-built Ford Mustang. Macauley Jones was replaced by Tim Slade.

In 2022 Tim Slade and Tim Blanchard competed as the only single car team in the Supercars Championship finishing their 2nd full-time season finishing the championship in 11th position.

2023 saw the beginning of the new GEN3 rule and the Blanchard Racing Team entered their third year of full-time Supercars racing and were the first team to complete the build of the GEN3 regulation car. Todd Hazelwood was signed as the primary driver of the CoolDrive Racing Ford Mustang and co-driver was Tim Blanchard. 2023 also saw BRT introduce a Super2 Category entry driven by Aaron Love.

In 2024 BRT expanded to a two-car team with a combination of James Courtney lead the driver line-up in car number 7, with Aaron Love in car 3. The second Teams Racing Charter (TRC) was bought from Tickford Racing.

In 2025, Aaron Cameron replaced Love in car number 3 after the season opening round at Sydney. Courtney retired at the end of the 2025 season, and was replaced with James Golding.

== Supercars Championship history ==
=== Drivers ===
The following is a list of drivers who have driven for the team in the Supercars championship, in order of their first appearance. Drivers who only drove for the team on a part-time basis are listed in italics.

- (Australia) Tim Blanchard (2017–18, 2020–2023)
- (Australia) Todd Hazelwood (2017, 2023)
- (Australia) Dale Wood (2018)
- (Australia) Macauley Jones (2019–20)
- (Australia) Dean Canto (2019)
- (Australia) Tim Slade (2021–2022)
- (Australia) Jake Kostecki (2023)
- (Australia) Aaron Love (2023–2025)
- (Australia) James Courtney (2024–2025)
- (Australia) Aaron Cameron (2024–present)
- (Australia) Jack Perkins (2024–2025)
- (Australia) Zak Best (2025–present)
- (Australia) James Golding (2026–present)
- (New Zealand) Richie Stanaway (2026–present)

=== Stats ===
Year	Driver	Race Starts	Race wins	Podiums
2017–2018, 2020–2023	(Australia) Tim Blanchard	60	0	0
2017, 2023	(Australia) Todd Hazelwood	31	0	0
2018	(Australia) Dale Wood	3	0	0
2019–2020	(Australia) Macauley Jones	57	0	0
2019	(Australia) Dean Canto	5	0	0
2021–2022	(Australia) Tim Slade	63	0	0
2023–2025	(Australia) Aaron Love	29	0	0
2023	(Australia) Jake Kostecki	2	0	0
2024–2025	(Australia) James Courtney	56	0	1
2024–present	(Australia) Aaron Cameron	51	0	1
2024–2025	(Australia) Jack Perkins	4	0	0
2025–present	(Australia) Zak Best	2	0	0
2026–present	(Australia) James Golding	19	0	2

==== Car No. 3 results ====
Year	Driver	No.	Make	1	2	3	4	5	6	7	8	9	10	11	12	13	14	15	16	17	18	19	20	21	22	23	24	25	26	27	28	29	30	31	32	33	34	Position	Pts
2017	Tim Blanchard	21	Holden	ADE; R1; 19	ADE; R2; 21	SYM; R3; Ret	SYM; R4; Ret	PHI; R5; 15	PHI; R6; 15	BAR; R7; 26	BAR; R8; 23	WIN; R9; 17	WIN; R10; 21	HID; R11; 12	HID; R12; 21	TOW; R13; 14	TOW; R14; 20	QLD; R15; 21	QLD; R16; 17	SMP; R17; 10	SMP; R18; 13	SAN; Q DNS	SAN; R19; DNS	BAT; R20; 12	SUR; R21; 15	SUR; R22; 20	PUK; R23; 19	PUK; R24; 16	NEW; R25; 12	NEW; R26; 16								22nd	1302
2018	Tim Blanchard	21	Holden	ADE; R1; Ret	ADE; R2; 23	MEL; R3; 23	MEL; R4; 21	MEL; R5; 11	MEL; R6; 20	SYM; R7; 21	SYM; R8; 16	PHI; R9; 21	PHI; R10; 23	BAR; R11; Ret	BAR; R12; 24	WIN; R13; 24	WIN; R14; 18	HID; R15; 19	HID; R16; 18	TOW; R17; 24	TOW; R18; 24	QLD; R19; 23	QLD; R20; 22	SMP; R21; 16	BEN; R22; 15	BEN; R23; 21	SAN; QR; 14	SAN; R24; 19	BAT; R25; 18	SUR; R26; 17	SUR; R27; C	PUK; R28; 12	PUK; R29; 26	NEW; R30; Ret	NEW; R31; 22			24th	1277
2019	Macauley Jones	21	Holden	ADE; R1; DNS	ADE; R2; 23	MEL; R3; 19	MEL; R4; 22	MEL; R5; 20	MEL; R6; Ret	SYM; R7; 20	SYM; R8; 20	PHI; R9; 18	PHI; R10; 21	BAR; R11; 24	BAR; R12; 17	WIN; R13; 16	WIN; R14; 16	HID; R15; 22	HID; R16; 22	TOW; R17; 18	TOW; R18; 17	QLD; R19; 24	QLD; R20; 22	BEN; R21; 19	BEN; R22; 21	PUK; R23; 20	PUK; R24; 22	BAT; R25; 16	SUR; R26; 17	SUR; R27; 15	SAN; QR; 21	SAN; R28; 18	NEW; R29; 17	NEW; R30; 21				21st	1314
2020	Macauley Jones	3	Holden	ADE; R1; 17	ADE; R2; 19	MEL; R3; C	MEL; R4; C	MEL; R5; C	MEL; R6; C	SMP1; R7; 18	SMP1; R8; 16	SMP1; R9; 20	SMP2; R10; 8	SMP2; R11; 22	SMP2; R12; 23	HID1; R13; Ret	HID1; R14; 23	HID1; R15; 18	HID2; R16; 17	HID2; R17; 23	HID2; R18; 18	TOW1; R19; Ret	TOW1; R20; 18	TOW1; R21; 21	TOW2; R22; 19	TOW2; R23; 18	TOW2; R24; 19	BEN1; R25; 20	BEN1; R26; 18	BEN1; R27; 12	BEN2; R28; 17	BEN2; R29; 14	BEN2; R30; 18	BAT; R31; 13				19th	980
2021	Tim Slade	3	Ford	BAT; R1; Ret	BAT; R2; DNS	SAN; R3; 13	SAN; R4; 9	SAN; R5; 17	SYM; R6; 17	SYM; R7; 12	SYM; R8; 12	BEN; R9; 14	BEN; R10; 15	BEN; R11; 7	HID; R12; 7	HID; R13; 19	HID; R14; 9	TOW; R15; 6	TOW; R16; 8	TOW2; R17; 4	TOW2; R18; 12	TOW2; R19; 22	SYD1; R20; 10	SYD1; R21; 5	SYD1; R22; 9	SYD2; R23; 7	SYD2; R24; 12	SYD2; R25; 5	SYD3; R26; 9	SYD3; R27; 20	SYD3; R28; 20	SYD4; R29; 13	SYD4; R30; C	BAT; R31; 9				12th	1627
2022	Tim Slade	3	Ford	SMP; R1; 8	SMP; R2; 10	SYM; R3; 11	SYM; R4; 14	SYM; R5; 11	MEL; R6; 4	MEL; R7; 8	MEL; R8; 7	MEL; R9; 4	BAR; R10; 13	BAR; R11; 13	BAR; R12; 10	WIN; R13; 16	WIN; R14; 15	WIN; R15; 20	HID; R16; 12	HID; R17; 14	HID; R18; 11	TOW; R19; 8	TOW; R20; 8	BEN; R21; 23	BEN; R22; 16	BEN; R23; 11	SAN; R24; 18	SAN; R25; 11	SAN; R26; 6	PUK; R27; Ret	PUK; R28; 15	PUK; R29; 10	BAT; R30; 19	SUR; R31; 12	SUR; R32; 10	ADE; R33; 5	ADE; R34; 13	11th	1855
2023	Todd Hazelwood	3	Ford	NEW; R1; 14	NEW; R2; 15	MEL; R3; DSQ	MEL; R4; 20	MEL; R5; 15	MEL; R6; 9	BAR; R7; 4	BAR; R8; 7	BAR; R9; 14	SYM; R10; 20	SYM; R11; 19	SYM; R12; 24	HID; R13; 17	HID; R14; 14	HID; R15; 10	TOW; R16; 23	TOW; R17; Ret	SMP; R18; 18	SMP; R19; 21	BEN; R20; 12	BEN; R21; 16	BEN; R22; 16	SAN; R23; 17	BAT; R24; Ret	SUR; R25; 19	SUR; R26; 18	ADE; R27; 12	ADE; R28; 11							21st	1221
2024	Aaron Love	3	Ford	BAT1; R1; Ret	BAT1; R2; 22	MEL; R3; 21	MEL; R4; 19	MEL; R5; 17	MEL; R6; 12	TAU; R7; 15	TAU; R8; 23	BAR; R9; 21	BAR; R10; 13	HID; R11; 19	HID; R12; 22	TOW; R13; 20	TOW; R14; 23	SMP; R15; 23	SMP; R16; 25	SYM; R17; 20	SYM; R18; 20	SAN; R19; 17	BAT; R20; 23	SUR; R21; 21	SUR; R22; 19	ADE; R23; 21	ADE; R24; 21											24th	1027
2025	Aaron Love	3	Ford	SMP; R1; 24	SMP; R2	SMP; R3	MEL; R4	MEL; R5	MEL; R6	MEL; R7	TAU; R8	TAU; R9	TAU; R10	SYM; R11	SYM; R12	SYM; R13	BAR; R14	BAR; R15	BAR; R16	HID; R17	HID; R18	HID; R19	TOW; R20	TOW; R21	TOW; R22	QLD; R23	QLD; R24	QLD; R25	BEN; R26	BAT; R27	SUR; R28	SUR; R29	SAN; R30	SAN; R31	ADE; R32	ADE; R33	ADE; R34	23rd*	59*
2025	Aaron Cameron	3	Ford	SMP; R1	SMP; R2	SMP; R3	MEL; R4	MEL; R5	MEL; R6	MEL; R7	TAU; R8	TAU; R9	TAU; R10	SYM; R11	SYM; R12	SYM; R13	BAR; R14	BAR; R15	BAR; R16	HID; R17	HID; R18	HID; R19	TOW; R20	TOW; R21	TOW; R22	QLD; R23	QLD; R24	QLD; R25	BEN; R26	BAT; R27	SUR; R28	SUR; R29	SAN; R30	SAN; R31	ADE; R32	ADE; R33	ADE; R34		

==== Car No. 7 results ====
Year	Driver	No.	Make	1	2	3	4	5	6	7	8	9	10	11	12	13	14	15	16	17	18	19	20	21	22	23	24	25	26	27	28	29	30	31	32	33	34	Position	Pts
2023	Aaron Love	7	Ford	NEW; R1	NEW; R2	MEL; R3	MEL; R4	MEL; R5	MEL; R6	BAR; R7	BAR; R8	BAR; R9	SYM; R10	SYM; R11	SYM; R12	HID; R13	HID; R14	HID; R15	TOW; R16	TOW; R17	SMP; R18	SMP; R19	BEN; R20	BEN; R21	BEN; R22	SAN; R23; 24	BAT; R24; 19	SUR; R25	SUR; R26	ADE; R27	ADE; R28							49th	162
2023	Jake Kostecki	7	Ford	NEW; R1	NEW; R2	MEL; R3	MEL; R4	MEL; R5	MEL; R6	BAR; R7	BAR; R8	BAR; R9	SYM; R10	SYM; R11	SYM; R12	HID; R13	HID; R14	HID; R15	TOW; R16	TOW; R17	SMP; R18	SMP; R19	BEN; R20	BEN; R21	BEN; R22	SAN; R23; 24	BAT; R24; 19	SUR; R25	SUR; R26	ADE; R27	ADE; R28							50th	162
2024	James Courtney	7	Ford	BAT1; R1; 15	BAT1; R2; 19	MEL; R3; 8	MEL; R4; 22	MEL; R5; 11	MEL; R6; 16	TAU; R7; 17	TAU; R8; 22	BAR; R9; 6	BAR; R10; 14	HID; R11; 23	HID; R12; 23	TOW; R13; 20	TOW; R14; 23	SMP; R15; 21	SMP; R16; 23	SYM; R17; 21	SYM; R18; 19	SAN; R19; 18	BAT; R20; 21	SUR; R21; 15	SUR; R22; 23	ADE; R23; 8	ADE; R24; 13											21st	1298
2025	James Courtney	7	Ford	SMP; R1; 17	SMP; R2	SMP; R3	MEL; R4	MEL; R5	MEL; R6	MEL; R7	TAU; R8	TAU; R9	TAU; R10	SYM; R11	SYM; R12	SYM; R13	BAR; R14	BAR; R15	BAR; R16; 3	HID; R17	HID; R18	HID; R19	TOW; R20	TOW; R21	TOW; R22	QLD; R23	QLD; R24	QLD; R25	BEN; R26	BAT; R27	SUR; R28	SUR; R29	SAN; R30	SAN; R31	ADE; R32	ADE; R33	ADE; R34		

=== Bathurst 1000 results ===
Year	No.	Car	Drivers	Position	Laps
2017	21	Holden Commodore VF	(Australia) Tim Blanchard (Australia) Todd Hazelwood	12th	160
2018	21	Holden Commodore ZB	(Australia) Tim Blanchard (Australia) Dale Wood	18th	159
2019	21	Holden Commodore ZB	(Australia) Macauley Jones (Australia) Dean Canto	16th	160
2020	3	Holden Commodore ZB	(Australia) Macauley Jones (Australia) Tim Blanchard	13th	161
2021	3	Ford Mustang GT	(Australia) Tim Slade (Australia) Tim Blanchard	9th	161
2022	3	Ford Mustang GT	(Australia) Tim Slade (Australia) Tim Blanchard	19th	161
2023	3	Ford Mustang GT	(Australia) Todd Hazelwood (Australia) Tim Blanchard	DNF	156
2023	7	Ford Mustang GT	(Australia) Aaron Love (Australia) Jake Kostecki	19th	160
2024	3	Ford Mustang GT	(Australia) Aaron Love (Australia) Aaron Cameron	23rd	160
2024	7	Ford Mustang GT	(Australia) James Courtney (Australia) Jack Perkins	21st	160
2025	3	Ford Mustang GT	(Australia) Aaron Cameron (Australia) Zak Best	9th	161
2025	7	Ford Mustang GT	(Australia) James Courtney (Australia) Jack Perkins	DNF	127
2026	3	Ford Mustang GT	(Australia) Aaron Cameron (Australia) Zak Best		
2026	7	Ford Mustang GT	(Australia) James Golding (New Zealand) Richie Stanaway		
