= Alex Rullo =

Australian racing car driver (born 2000)

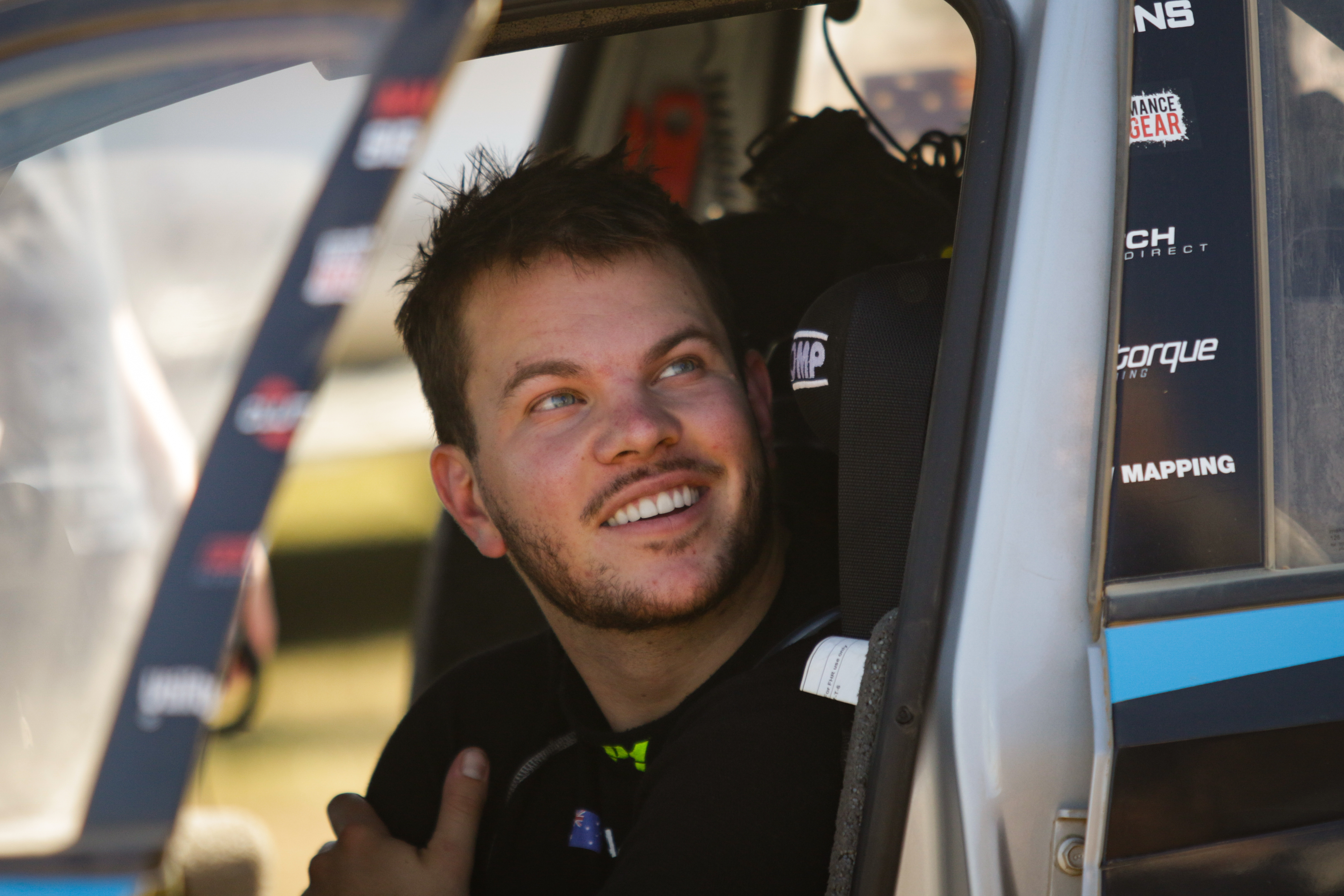
- Nationality: Australian
- Born: Alexander John Rullo; 15 June 2000 (age 26) Perth, Western Australia

Australian Rally Championship
- Years active: 2022-
- Teams: IntelliSpatial Fleetcare Racing
- Starts: 19
- Podiums: 4

Supercars Championship career
- Current team: Kelly Racing (Endurance race co-driver)
- Championships: 0
- Races: 30
- Wins: 0
- Podiums: 0
- Pole positions: 0
- 2019 position: 43rd (329 pts)

Alexander John Rullo (born 15 June 2000) is an Australian racing car and rally driver. He currently drives in the Australian Rally Championship for IntelliSpatial Fleetcare Racing.

Rullo has formerly driven in the TCR Australia Series for Kelly Racing. He has also co-driven with Simona de Silvestro in the No. 78 Nissan Altima in the Pirtek Enduro Cup.

Rullo also achieved a podium place at the 2025 World Time Attack Challenge at Sydney Motorsport Park. At the age of 14, he won a race in the V8 Touring Car National Series, and in 2017 he made his Supercars debut at the age of 16.

== Racing career ==
=== V8 Touring Car Series ===
Rullo made his debut in the V8 Touring Car National Series at the age of 14, winning a race in his second event. He managed to win four races out of the 15 contested and finished the season second overall for MW Motorsport.

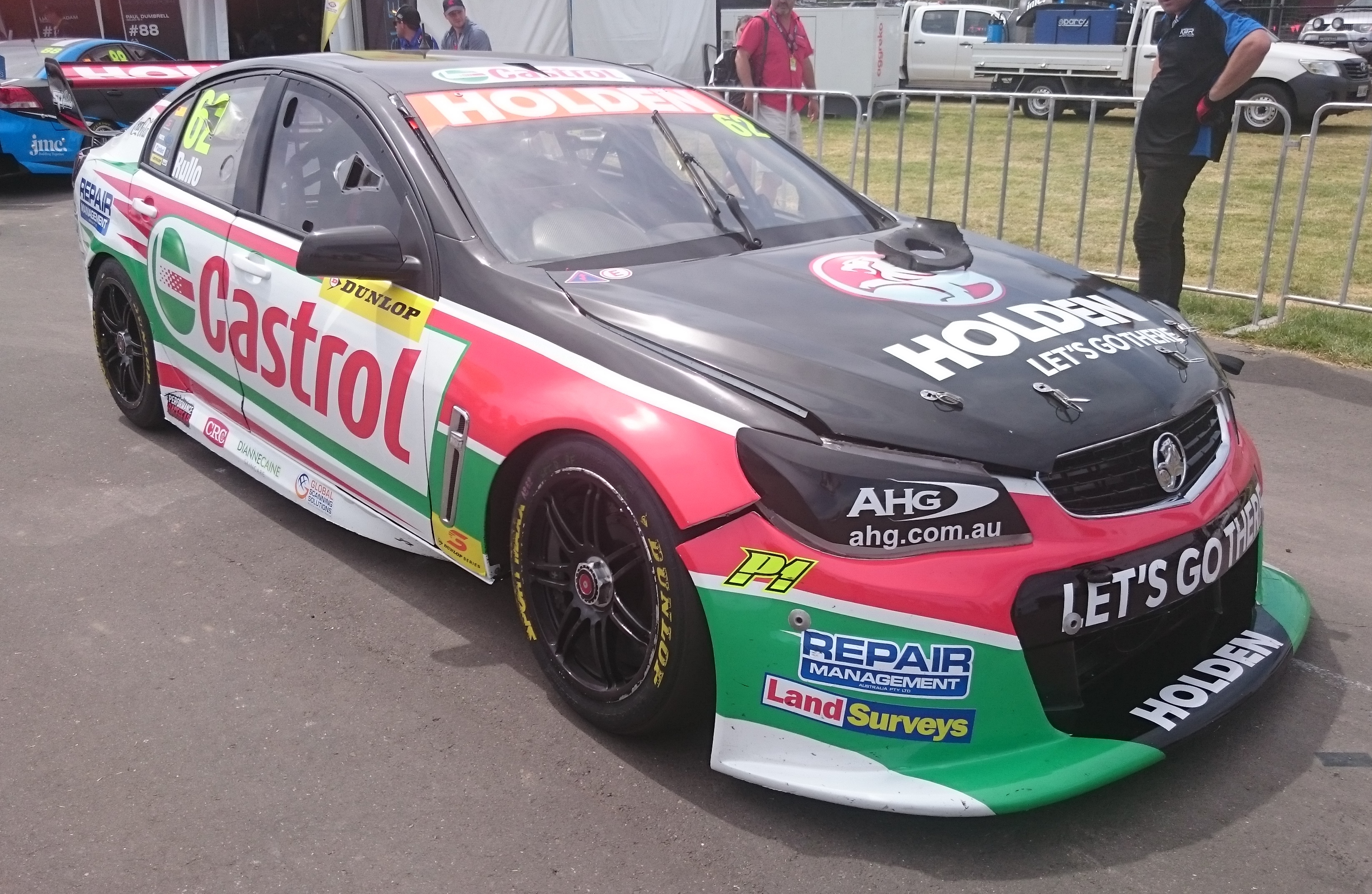
Rullo contested the 2016 Dunlop Series for Lucas Dumbrell Motorsport in a Holden Commodore VF

=== Super2 Series ===
Rullo made his Dunlop Series debut for Lucas Dumbrell Motorsport in 2016, driving a Castrol-backed Holden VF Commodore for the full season. Rullo's best race finish was sixth (twice) and he finished 17th in the championship. In 2018, he would drive a Nissan Altima L33 with MW Motorsport.

=== Supercars Championship ===
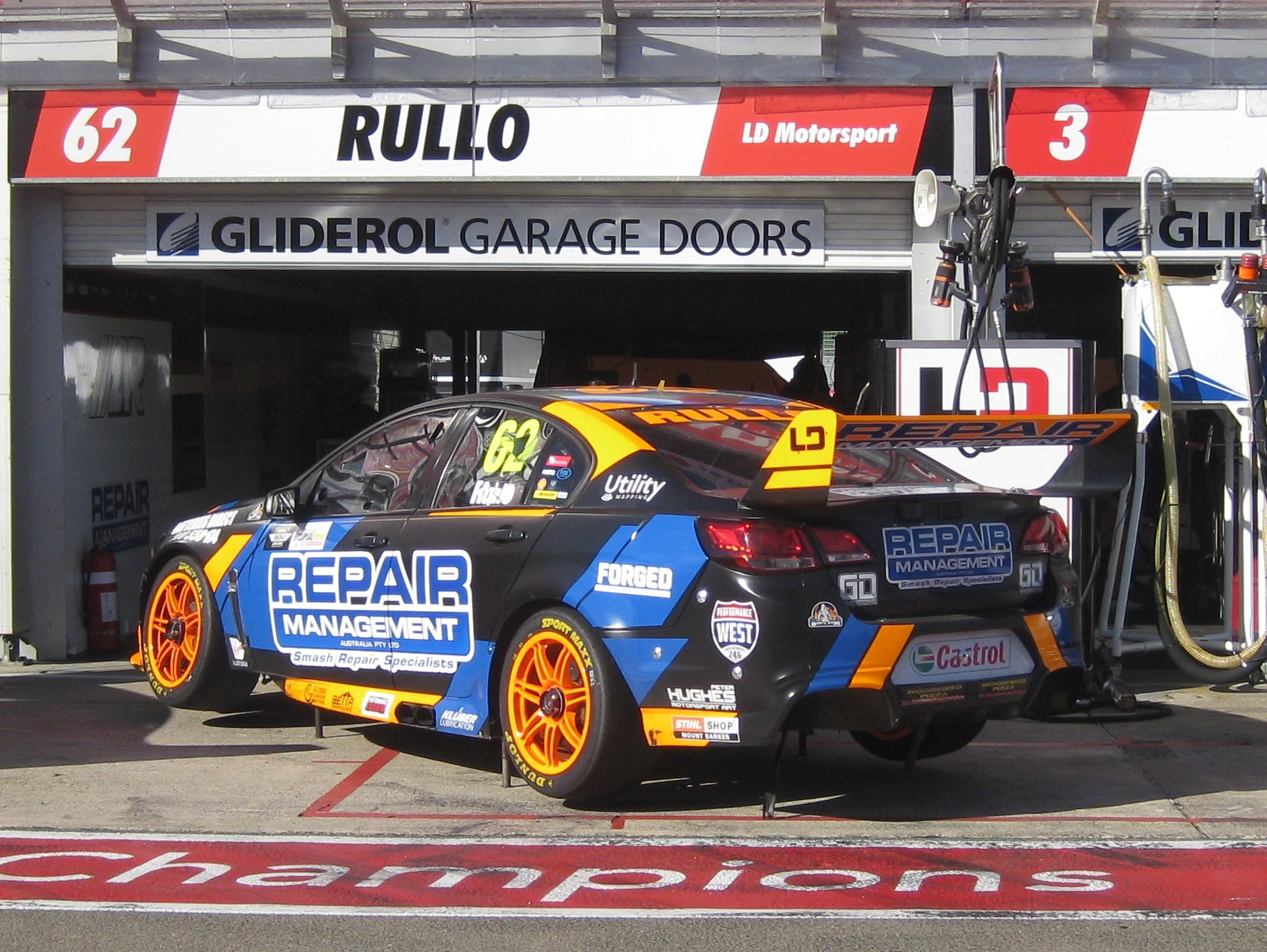
Rullo contested the 2017 Virgin Australia Supercars Championship for Lucas Dumbrell Motorsport in a Holden Commodore VF

In February 2017, an announcement was made that 16-year-old Rullo was to make his Supercars debut with Lucas Dumbrell Motorsport, the team which he raced with in the Development Series the year prior.

In doing so, he became the youngest driver in the championship's history. Coincidentally, the previous driver to hold the record was Paul Dumbrell, the brother of Lucas, who debuted in 1999.

It was reported that Rullo would run the number No. 62 in which he had raced since his karting days.

Rullo did not qualify for the new-for-2017 CAMS Superlicense, and was given special dispensation to be reviewed on a race-by-race basis.

Rullo competed in the majority of the 2017 season and was a part of the Enduro Cup in both 2018 and 2019 for Nissan.

=== TCR Australia ===
In 2019, Rullo raced in the inaugural TCR Australia Touring Car Series for Kelly Racing in a Holden Astra TCR.

=== Rally ===
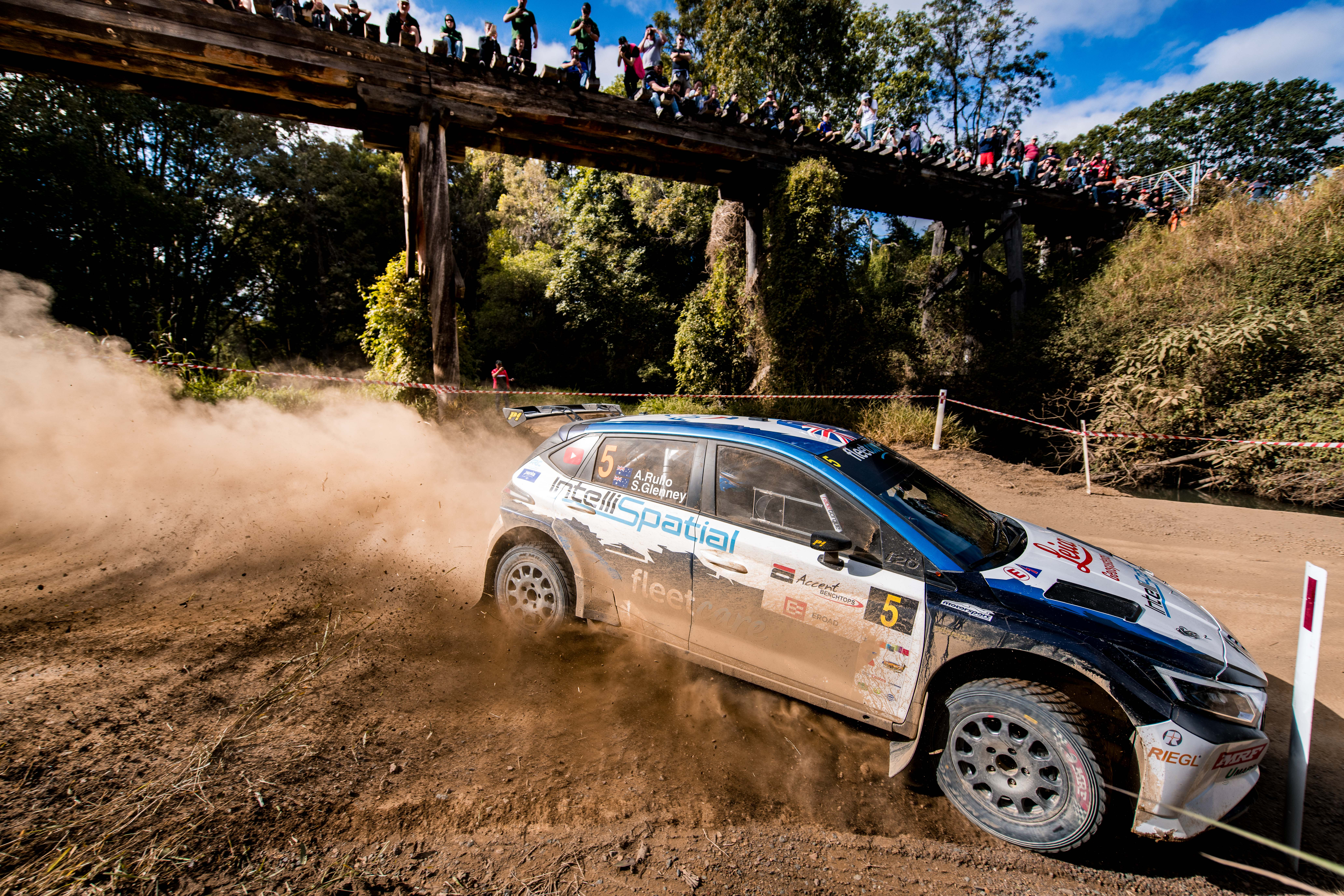
Rullo on his way to second overall at Rally Queensland 2025.

Making the switch to rallying in 2022, Rullo progressed from a production-specification Mitsubishi to a Hyundai i20 N Rally2 for the 2023 season with the backing of internationally recognised rally team, Race Torque Engineering.

In his first full-time season of 2023, Rullo and co-driver Steve Glenney finished 12th in the Australian Rally Championship (ARC), and shot up to fifth overall in the 2024 season.

Also in the 2024 season, Rullo won the West Australian Rally Championship and took victory on tarmac at the Adelaide Rally.

For the 2025 season, Rullo linked up with former World Rally Championship star, Hayden Paddon, to further progress in the series within the Race Torque Engineering stable.

At the third round, Rally Queensland, their combined results delivered Hyundai Australia's first 1-2 finish in ARC history.

== Circuit career results ==
Season	Series	Position	Car	Team
2014	Western Australian Formula Vee 1600 Championship	13th	Ajay 06 Volkswagen	
2014	Australian Swift Racing Series	11th	Suzuki Swift Sport	
2015	Kumho Tyres Australian V8 Touring Car Series	2nd	Ford BF Falcon	MW Motorsport
2015	Western Australia Super GT Series	4th	Ford BF Falcon	Performance West
2016	Supercars Dunlop Series	17th	Holden VF Commodore	Lucas Dumbrell Motorsport
2016	Australian GT Championship	46th	Lamborghini Gallardo FL2	Performance West
2017	Virgin Australia Supercars Championship	29th	Holden VF Commodore	Lucas Dumbrell Motorsport
2018	Super2 Series	4th	Nissan Altima L33	MW Motorsport
2018	Virgin Australia Supercars Championship	50th	Nissan Altima L33	Nissan Motorsport
2019	Virgin Australia Supercars Championship	43rd	Nissan Altima L33	Kelly Racing
2019	TCR Australia	13th	Holden Astra TCR	Kelly Racing

=== Super3 Series results ===
(key) (Round results only)

Super3 Series results
Year	Team	No.	Car	1	2	3	4	5	6	7	8	9	10	11	12	13	14	15	Position	Points
2015	Performance West	62	Ford BF Falcon	SAN; R1; Ret	SAN; R2; Ret	SAN; R3; 11	WIN; R4; 2	WIN; R5; 2	WIN; R6; 1	QLD; R7; 1	QLD; R8; 1	QLD; R9; 1	PHI; R10; 2	PHI; R11; 14	PHI; R12; 2	SMP; R13; 3	SMP; R14; 2	SMP; R15; 2	2nd	505

=== Super2 Series results ===
(key) (Round results only)

Super2 Series results
Year	Team	No.	Car	1	2	3	4	5	6	7	8	9	10	11	12	13	14	15	16	Position	Points
2016	Lucas Dumbrell Motorsport	62	Holden VF Commodore	ADE; R1; 19	ADE; R2; Ret	PHI; R3; 18	PHI; R4; 16	PHI; R5; 20	BAR; R6; 15	BAR; R7; 6	BAR; R8; 19	TOW; R9; Ret	TOW; R10; 12	SAN; R11; Ret	SAN; R12; 16	SAN; R13; 6	BAT; R14; 16	HOM; R15; 14	HOM; R16; 13	17th	686
2018	MW Motorsport	62	Nissan Altima L33	ADE; R1; 11	ADE; R2; 19	ADE; R3; 11	SYM; R4; 12	SYM; R5; 7	SYM; R6; 5	BAR; R7; 1	BAR; R8; 6	BAR; R9; 9	TOW; R10; 3	TOW; R11; 6	SAN; R12; 4	SAN; R13; 7	BAT; R14; 2	NEW; R15; 12	NEW; R16; C	4th	1328

=== Supercars Championship results ===
Supercars results
Year	Team	No.	Car	1	2	3	4	5	6	7	8	9	10	11	12	13	14	15	16	17	18	19	20	21	22	23	24	25	26	27	28	29	30	31	32	Position	Points
2016	Lucas Dumbrell Motorsport	62	Holden VF Commodore	ADE; R1	ADE; R2	ADE; R3	SYM; R4	SYM; R5	PHI; R6	PHI; R7	BAR; R8	BAR; R9	WIN; R10; PO	WIN; R11; PO	HID; R12	HID; R13	TOW; R14	TOW; R15	QLD; R16; PO	QLD; R17; PO	SMP; R18	SMP; R19	SAN; QR	SAN; R24	BAT; R25	SUR; R26	SUR; R27	PUK; R24	PUK; R25	PUK; R26	PUK; R27	SYD; R28	SYD; R29			N/C	0
2017	Lucas Dumbrell Motorsport	62	Holden VF Commodore	ADE; R1; 23	ADE; R2; 25	SYM; R3; Ret	SYM; R4; Ret	PHI; R5; Ret	PHI; R6; 22	BAR; R7; 24	BAR; R8; 25	WIN; R9; 25	WIN; R10; 27	HID; R11; 21	HID; R12; 23	TOW; R13; 21	TOW; R14; 24	QLD; R15; Ret	QLD; R16; 25	SMP; R17; 22	SMP; R18; Ret	SAN; QR; 21	SAN; R19; Ret	BAT; R20; 15	SUR; R21; 23	SUR; R22; Ret	PUK; R23	PUK; R24	NEW; R25	NEW; R26						29th	594
2018	Nissan Motorsport	78	Nissan Altima L33	ADE; R1	ADE; R2	MEL; R3	MEL; R4	MEL; R5	MEL; R6	SYM; R7	SYM; R8	PHI; R9	PHI; R10	BAR; R11	BAR; R12	WIN; R13; PO	WIN; R14; PO	HID; R15	HID; R16	TOW; R17	TOW; R18	QLD; R19; PO	QLD; R20; PO	SMP; R21	BEN; R22	BEN; R23	SAN; QR; Ret	SAN; R24; Ret	BAT; R25; 14	SUR; R26; 18	SUR; R27; C	PUK; R28	PUK; R29	NEW; R30	NEW; R31	50th	177
2019	Kelly Racing	78	Nissan Altima L33	ADE; R1	ADE; R2	MEL; R3	MEL; R4	MEL; R5	MEL; R6	SYM; R7	SYM; R8	PHI; R9	PHI; R10	BAR; R11	BAR; R12	WIN; R13; PO	WIN; R14; PO	HID; R15	HID; R16	TOW; R17	TOW; R18	QLD; R19	QLD; R20	BEN; R21; PO	BEN; R22; PO	PUK; R23	PUK; R24	BAT; R25; 13	SUR; R26; 21	SUR; R27; 22	SAN; QR; 19	SAN; R28; 15	NEW; R29	NEW; R30		41st	329

=== Bathurst 1000 results ===
Year	Team	Car	Co-driver	Position	Laps
2017	Lucas Dumbrell Motorsport	Holden Commodore VF	(Australia) Alex Davison	15th	159
2018	Nissan Motorsport	Nissan Altima L33	(Switzerland) Simona de Silvestro	14th	161
2019	Kelly Racing	Nissan Altima L33	(Switzerland) Simona de Silvestro	13th	160

=== TCR Australia results ===
TCR Australia results
Year	Team	Car	1	2	3	4	5	6	7	8	9	10	11	12	13	14	15	16	17	18	19	20	21	Position	Points
2019	Kelly Racing	Holden Astra TCR	SMP; R1; 11	SMP; R2; 13	SMP; R3; 9	PHI; R4; 6	PHI; R5; 5	PHI; R6; 12	BEN; R7; 8	BEN; R8; Ret	BEN; R9; 12	QLD; R10; 8	QLD; R11; 11	QLD; R12; 13	WIN; R13	WIN; R14	WIN; R15	SAN; R16	SAN; R17	SAN; R18	BEN; R19	BEN; R20	BEN; R21	16th	209

== Rally career results ==
Season	Series	Position	Car	Team
2022	Australian Production Rally Championship	9th	Mitsubishi Lancer Evo IX	
2023	Australian Rally Championship	12th	Hyundai i20 N Rally2	IntelliSpatial Fleetcare Racing
2023	West Australian Rally Championship	6th	Hyundai i20 N Rally2	IntelliSpatial Fleetcare Racing
2024	Australian Rally Championship	5th	Hyundai i20 N Rally2	IntelliSpatial Fleetcare Racing
2024	West Australian Rally Championship	1st	Hyundai i20 N Rally2	IntelliSpatial Fleetcare Racing
2025	Australian Rally Championship	4th	Hyundai i20 N Rally2	IntelliSpatial Fleetcare Racing
2025	West Australian Rally Championship	14th	Hyundai i20 N Rally2	IntelliSpatial Fleetcare Racing
