= 2017 Vodafone Gold Coast 600 =

2017 V8 Supercar championship race

(Queensland) 2017 Vodafone Gold Coast 600
Event Information
- Round 12 of 14 in the 2017 International V8 Supercars Championship
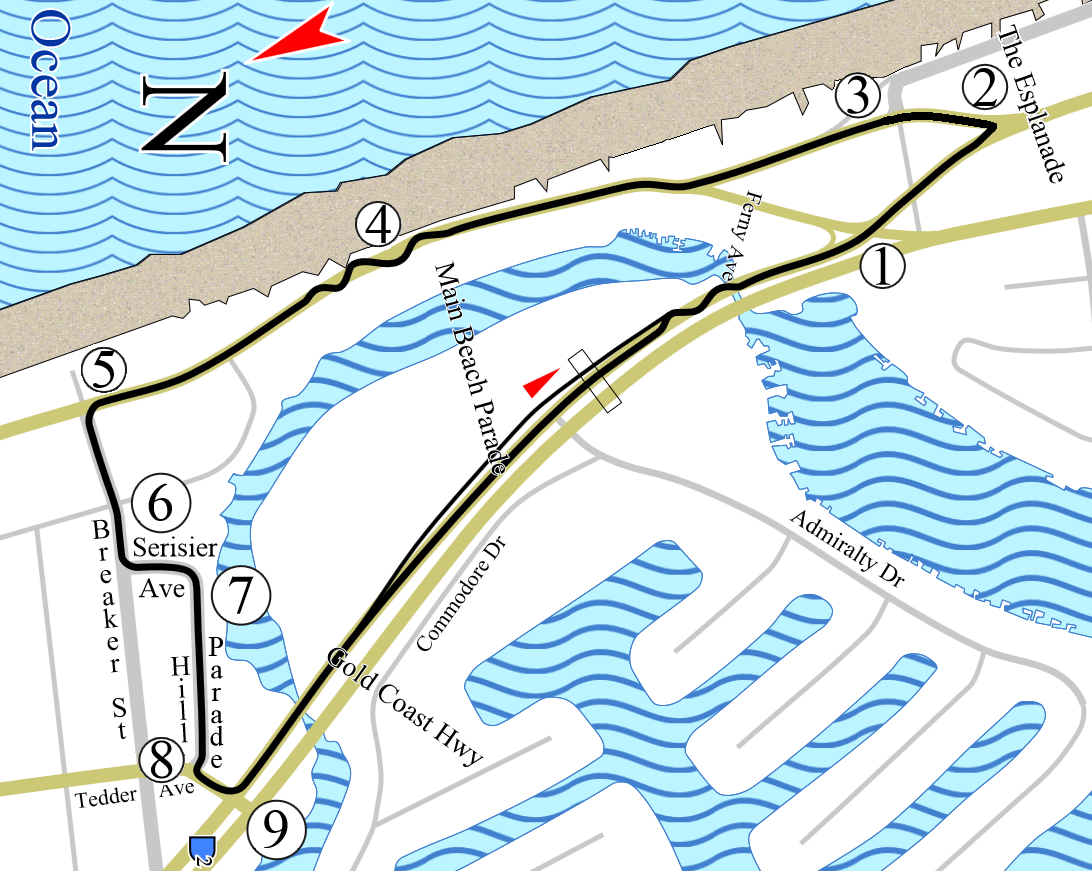
- Date: 20–22 October 2017
- Location: Surfers Paradise, Queensland
- Venue: Gold Coast Street Circuit

Results
Race 1
Distance	94 laps	280 km
Pole position	(Australia) Chaz Mostert; Rod Nash Racing	1:21.5485
Winner	(Australia) Chaz Mostert (Australia) Steve Owen; Rod Nash Racing	2:18:28.8454
Race 2
Distance	102 laps	300 km
Pole position	(New Zealand) Shane van Gisbergen; Triple Eight Race Engineering	1:10.8383
Winner	(New Zealand) Scott McLaughlin (France) Alexandre Prémat; DJR Team Penske	2:05:17.3923

The 2017 Vodafone Gold Coast 600 was a motor racing event for the Supercars Championship, held on the weekend of 20 to 22 October 2017. The event was held at the Gold Coast Street Circuit in Surfers Paradise, Queensland and consisted of two races, 300 kilometres in length. It is the twelfth event of fourteen in the 2017 Supercars Championship and hosted Races 21 and 22 of the season.

== Background ==
=== Driver changes ===
Ashley Walsh, having withdrawn from the Bathurst 1000 due to injury, was again replaced by Andre Heimgartner.

== Results ==
=== Race 21 ===
Race

Pos	No.	Driver	Team	Car	Laps	Time / Retired	Grid	Points
1	55	(Australia) Chaz Mostert (Australia) Steve Owen	Rod Nash Racing	Ford FG X Falcon	94	2:18:28.8454	1	150
2	6	(Australia) Cam Waters (New Zealand) Richie Stanaway	Prodrive Racing Australia	Ford FG X Falcon	94	+2.4917	14	138
3	14	(Australia) Tim Slade (New Zealand) Andre Heimgartner	Brad Jones Racing	Holden VF Commodore	94	+5.5391	3	129
4	97	(New Zealand) Shane van Gisbergen (Australia) Matthew Campbell	Triple Eight Race Engineering	Holden VF Commodore	94	+7.0041	7	120
5	23	(Australia) Michael Caruso (Australia) Dean Fiore	Nissan Motorsport	Nissan L33 Altima	94	+21.2713	4	111
6	88	(Australia) Jamie Whincup (Australia) Paul Dumbrell	Triple Eight Race Engineering	Holden VF Commodore	94	+26.8865	2	102
7	888	(Australia) Craig Lowndes (New Zealand) Steven Richards	Triple Eight Race Engineering	Holden VF Commodore	94	+28.2675	11	96
8	5	(Australia) Mark Winterbottom (Australia) Dean Canto	Prodrive Racing Australia	Ford FG X Falcon	94	+43.3660	8	90
9	56	(Australia) Jason Bright (Australia) Garry Jacobson	Britek Motorsport	Ford FG X Falcon	94	+47.5501	22	84
10	15	(Australia) Rick Kelly (Australia) David Wall	Nissan Motorsport	Nissan L33 Altima	94	+48.7764	5	78
11	02	(Australia) Scott Pye (Australia) Warren Luff	Walkinshaw Racing	Holden VF Commodore	94	+49.1463	13	72
12	17	(New Zealand) Scott McLaughlin (France) Alexandre Prémat	DJR Team Penske	Ford FG X Falcon	94	+50.0481	12	69
13	33	(Australia) Garth Tander (Australia) James Golding	Garry Rogers Motorsport	Holden VF Commodore	94	+51.3217	15	66
14	22	(Australia) James Courtney (Australia) Jack Perkins	Walkinshaw Racing	Holden VF Commodore	94	+51.7119	18	63
15	21	(Australia) Tim Blanchard (Australia) Todd Hazelwood	Tim Blanchard Racing	Holden VF Commodore	94	+1:00.3189	20	60
16	78	(Switzerland) Simona de Silvestro (Australia) David Russell	Nissan Motorsport	Nissan L33 Altima	94	+1:00.3282	21	57
17	9	(Australia) David Reynolds (Australia) Luke Youlden	Erebus Motorsport	Holden VF Commodore	94	+1:00.6666	23	54
18	34	(Australia) James Moffat (Australia) Richard Muscat	Garry Rogers Motorsport	Holden VF Commodore	94	+1:02.6658	19	51
19	12	(New Zealand) Fabian Coulthard (Australia) Tony D'Alberto	DJR Team Penske	Ford FG X Falcon	94	+1:02.9277	16	48
20	19	(Australia) Will Davison (Australia) Jonathon Webb	Tekno Autosports	Holden VF Commodore	94	+1:05.5635	17	45
21	8	(Australia) Nick Percat (Australia) Macauley Jones	Brad Jones Racing	Holden VF Commodore	94	+1:14.1453	6	42
22	99	(Australia) Dale Wood (New Zealand) Chris Pither	Erebus Motorsport	Holden VF Commodore	94	+1:29.5462	24	39
23	62	(Australia) Alex Rullo (Australia) Alex Davison	Lucas Dumbrell Motorsport	Holden VF Commodore	92	+2 Laps	25	36
Ret	18	(Australia) Lee Holdsworth (Australia) Karl Reindler	Team 18	Holden VF Commodore	58		10	
Ret	3	(Australia) Aaren Russell (Australia) Taz Douglas	Lucas Dumbrell Motorsport	Holden VF Commodore	48	Suspension	26	
Ret	7	(Australia) Todd Kelly (Australia) Jack Le Brocq	Nissan Motorsport	Nissan L33 Altima	45	Accident	9	

=== Race 22 ===
Race

Pos	No.	Driver	Team	Car	Laps	Time / Retired	Grid	Points
1	17	(New Zealand) Scott McLaughlin (France) Alexandre Prémat	DJR Team Penske	Ford FG X Falcon	102	2:05:17.3923	13	150
2	88	(Australia) Jamie Whincup (Australia) Paul Dumbrell	Triple Eight Race Engineering	Holden VF Commodore	102	+1.4752	2	138
3	97	(New Zealand) Shane van Gisbergen (Australia) Matthew Campbell	Triple Eight Race Engineering	Holden VF Commodore	102	+2.5170	1	129
4	888	(Australia) Craig Lowndes (New Zealand) Steven Richards	Triple Eight Race Engineering	Holden VF Commodore	102	+21.0491	3	120
5	5	(Australia) Mark Winterbottom (Australia) Dean Canto	Prodrive Racing Australia	Ford FG X Falcon	102	+25.8166	8	111
6	22	(Australia) James Courtney (Australia) Jack Perkins	Walkinshaw Racing	Holden VF Commodore	102	+28.4384	4	102
7	55	(Australia) Chaz Mostert (Australia) Steve Owen	Rod Nash Racing	Ford FG X Falcon	102	+31.4406	5	96
8	18	(Australia) Lee Holdsworth (Australia) Karl Reindler	Team 18	Holden VF Commodore	102	+31.5831	10	90
9	12	(New Zealand) Fabian Coulthard (Australia) Tony D'Alberto	DJR Team Penske	Ford FG X Falcon	102	+31.9998	22	84
10	8	(Australia) Nick Percat (Australia) Macauley Jones	Brad Jones Racing	Holden VF Commodore	102	+44.5535	14	78
11	15	(Australia) Rick Kelly (Australia) David Wall	Nissan Motorsport	Nissan L33 Altima	102	+52.5616	11	72
12	7	(Australia) Todd Kelly (Australia) Jack Le Brocq	Nissan Motorsport	Nissan L33 Altima	102	+53.5113	15	69
13	02	(Australia) Scott Pye (Australia) Warren Luff	Walkinshaw Racing	Holden VF Commodore	102	+1:01.1286	17	66
14	19	(Australia) Will Davison (Australia) Jonathon Webb	Tekno Autosports	Holden VF Commodore	102	+1:02.2540	18	63
15	23	(Australia) Michael Caruso (Australia) Dean Fiore	Nissan Motorsport	Nissan L33 Altima	102	+1:09.9655	9	60
16	56	(Australia) Jason Bright (Australia) Garry Jacobson	Britek Motorsport	Ford FG X Falcon	101	+1 Lap	16	57
17	33	(Australia) Garth Tander (Australia) James Golding	Garry Rogers Motorsport	Holden VF Commodore	101	+1 Lap	21	54
18	99	(Australia) Dale Wood (New Zealand) Chris Pither	Erebus Motorsport	Holden VF Commodore	101	+1 Lap	19	51
19	34	(Australia) James Moffat (Australia) Richard Muscat	Garry Rogers Motorsport	Holden VF Commodore	101	+1 Lap	20	48
20	21	(Australia) Tim Blanchard (Australia) Todd Hazelwood	Tim Blanchard Racing	Holden VF Commodore	101	+1 Lap	24	45
21	6	(Australia) Cam Waters (New Zealand) Richie Stanaway	Prodrive Racing Australia	Ford FG X Falcon	100	+2 Laps	7	42
22	14	(Australia) Tim Slade (New Zealand) Andre Heimgartner	Brad Jones Racing	Holden VF Commodore	85	+17 Laps	12	39
23	78	(Switzerland) Simona de Silvestro (Australia) David Russell	Nissan Motorsport	Nissan L33 Altima	85	+17 Laps	26	36
Ret	62	(Australia) Alex Rullo (Australia) Alex Davison	Lucas Dumbrell Motorsport	Holden VF Commodore	20		25	
Ret	9	(Australia) David Reynolds (Australia) Luke Youlden	Erebus Motorsport	Holden VF Commodore	15		6	
Ret	3	(Australia) Aaren Russell (Australia) Taz Douglas	Lucas Dumbrell Motorsport	Holden VF Commodore	8		23	
