= Penrite =

Australian lubricants company

- Industry: Oil and lubricants
- Founded: 1926; 100 years ago
- Founder: Les Mecoles
- Headquarters: Dandenong South, Australia
- Area served: Australia; Asia; Europe; North America
- Website: penriteoil.com.au/

Penrite is an Australian independent international lubricants company for vehicles established in 1926. The head office is located in Dandenong South in Melbourne, Australia, with other major offices in Sydney, Brisbane, Adelaide, Perth and Auckland, New Zealand and the United Kingdom, exporting to over 50 countries in Europe, Asia and the United States. The company is privately owned.

Penrite manufactures over 170 different products across 12 different market segments. The product range includes Motor oil, Automatic Transmission Fluids, Gear & Differential Oils, Heavy Duty, Hydraulic & Gear Oils, Industrial, Farm and Construction products, 2/4 Stroke & Garden Equipment Oils, Greases, Coolants, Fuel Treatments & Additives, Car Care, Motorcycle & Marine products, Veteran Vintage & Classic products, Brake Fluids and Power Steering & Suspension Fluids.

== History ==
In 1926, 16 year old Les Mecoles founded Penrite Oil Company from his parents’ home in St Kilda, Melbourne, Australia. The first batches of oil were made on his mother's kitchen stove and delivered to service stations, milling factories and the local shipping port using his father's wheelbarrow. As the business began to grow, a new blending facility was built in Richmond.

After several years, Penrite again moved to Abbotsford due to further growth as Melbourne and regional Victoria grew in population and the road and railway network expanded across Australia. In 1965, Penrite again was forced to move to nearby Brunswick East as the Abbotsford site was purchased by the Government of Victoria to make way for the newly commissioned Eastern Freeway. The business continued to grow, but in 1979, Les Mecoles, suffering from poor health, sold the company to John and Margaret Dymond.

In 1981, Penrite launched its flagship range of multigrade motor oils known as HPR (High Performance Range), identified to solve modern engine oil consumption problems and tailored for the local Australian driving conditions. During the late 1980s to mid-1990s, Penrite continued to grow and expand, opening up new distribution channels and market segments. A second blending facility was opened in Brisbane, soon followed by new warehousing in Perth, Adelaide, Hobart, Sydney and Darwin. Exports commenced in New Zealand, Southeast Asia, the United States, the United Kingdom and Europe.

In 1997, the existing blending facility in Brunswick East could no longer keep up with the demand and was relocated to Wantirna South in Melbourne's east and soon after, the Brisbane site was also relocated to larger premises in Crestmead. In 2016, Penrite opened a new blending facility and moved the head office from Wantirna South to Dandenong South.

== Motorsport ==
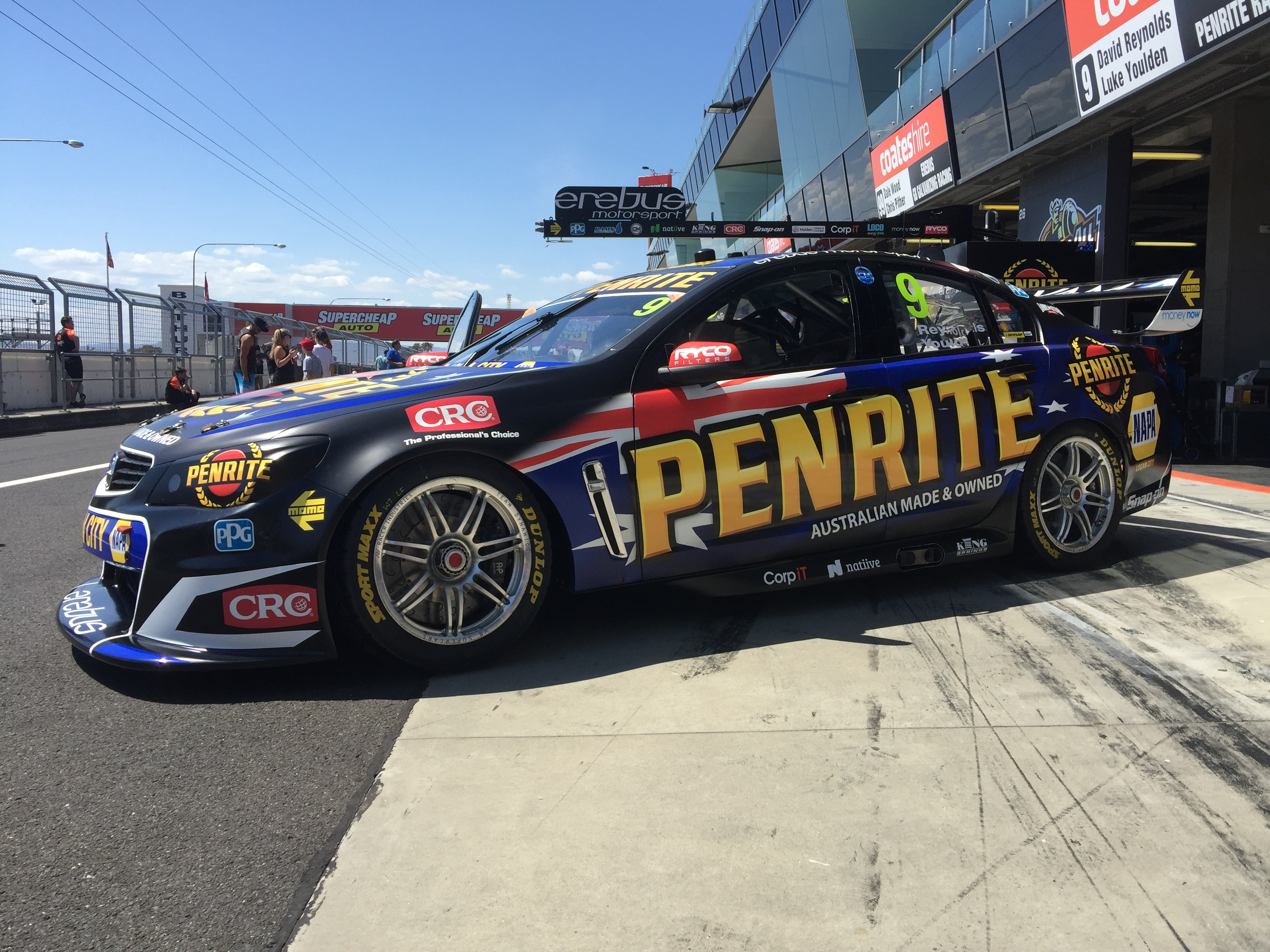
Erebus Motorsport 2017 Bathurst 1000 winning Holden Commodore VF

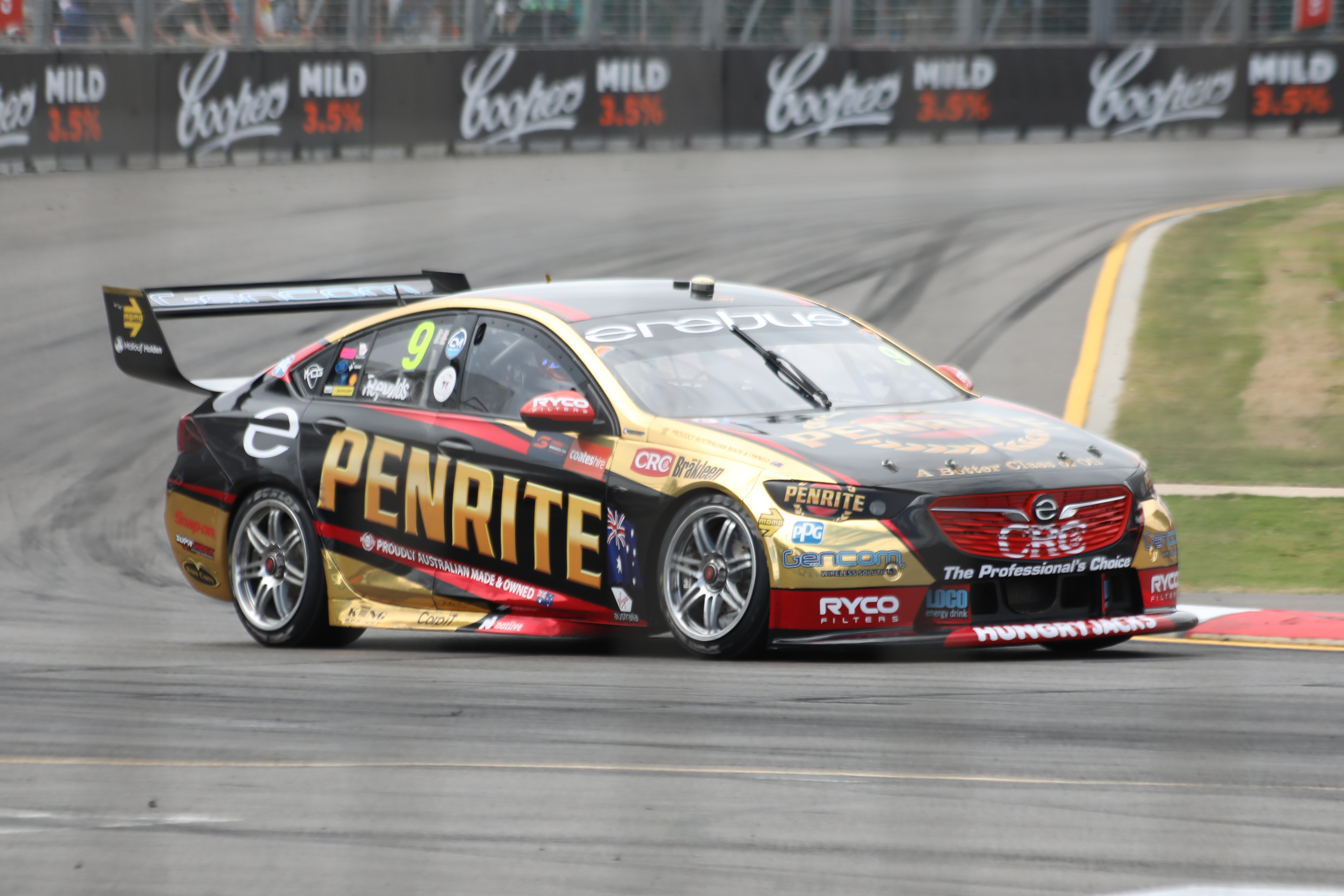
Erebus Motorsport Holden Commodore ZB at the 2018 Newcastle 500

Penrite's marketing activities includes an involvement in motorsport, partnering with numerous teams and privateers worldwide across a wide range of motorsport disciplines including Auto racing, Motorcycle racing, Kart racing and Boat racing. Some key partnerships include Honda Racing Corporation and Erebus Motorsport.

From 2015 until 2020, Penrite was the naming rights sponsor of Erebus Motorsport, initially for one car and from 2019 both cars. The most notable achievement of the partnership was winning 2017 Bathurst 1000 with David Reynolds and Luke Youlden. Penrite also took on title sponsorship of the Sandown 500.

In 2021 Penrite moved with David Reynolds to Kelly Racing. It also sponsored Matthew Payne's Nissan Altima L33 in Super2 Series for selected rounds.

Since 2022, Penrite expanded has been naming rights sponsor with Grove Racing.

The Penrite and Honda Racing partnership began in 2013 with the Australian factory Motocross Team. Since then the partnership expanded to sponsoring riders not only in Motorcross but Supercross, Endurance and Road Racing factory teams. The most notable achievements of the partnerships include the three straight Australian Supercross Championships in 2016, 2017 & 2018 with US rider Justin Brayton and the 2018 Australian Superbike Championship with rider Troy Herfoss.

== Environmental ==
Penrite is a signatory to the Australian Packaging Covenant which must meet local and regulatory requirements to minimise any environmental impact by reducing emissions and developing safe and sustainable, production, storage and distribution methodologies. In 2016, Penrite was awarded the Australian Packaging Covenant High Performer Award for exceeding the regulatory requirements.

In 2017 Penrite was also awarded the Most Innovative New Packaging Award by the Australian Automotive Aftermarket Association when releasing the Enviro Box™ a bag-in-a-box concept for packaging and dispensing lubricant designed to reduce landfill waste, increase productivity and reduce costs.
