= 2017 Tasmania SuperSprint =

2017 V8 Supercar championship race

2017 Tyrepower Tasmania SuperSprint
Event Information
- Round 2 of 14 in the 2017 Supercars Championship
- Date: 7–9 April 2017
- Location: Launceston, Tasmania
- Venue: Symmons Plains Raceway
- Weather: Showers

Results
Race 1
Distance	4 laps	10 km
Pole position	(New Zealand) Scott McLaughlin; DJR Team Penske	57.4178
Winner	(New Zealand) Shane van Gisbergen; Triple Eight Race Engineering	54:29.0032
Race 2
Distance	76 laps	184 km
Pole position	(Australia) Jamie Whincup; Triple Eight Race Engineering	58.3971
Winner	(New Zealand) Fabian Coulthard; DJR Team Penske	1:23:36.5118

The 2017 Tyrepower Tasmania SuperSprint was a motor racing event for the Supercars Championship, held on the weekend of 7 to 9 April 2017. The event was held at Symmons Plains Raceway in Launceston, Tasmania, and was scheduled to consist of one race of 120 kilometres and one race of 200 kilometres in length. It was the second event of fourteen in the 2017 Supercars Championship and hosted Races 3 and 4 of the season. The event was the 45th running of the Tasmania SuperSprint.

== Report ==
=== Background ===
Shane van Gisbergen entered the event as the championship leader ahead of Fabian Coulthard and James Courtney.

=== Race 3 ===
Race three began in damp conditions. Polesitter Scott McLaughlin had a slow getaway from pole position and was rounded up by Chaz Mostert and Shane van Gisbergen off the start. On lap two, Fabian Coulthard made contact with Rick Kelly on the exit of turn three, slowing up Garth Tander (who was behind Kelly), who in turn was hit by Cam Waters and subsequently spun, causing a chain reaction crash involving Tim Blanchard, James Courtney, Will Davison, Simona de Silvestro, Taz Douglas, James Moffat, Nick Percat, Scott Pye, Alex Rullo and Tim Slade. The race was immediately red-flagged and of the cars involved only Coulthard, de Silvestro and Waters returned to the grid (Coulthard and Waters) or the pit-lane (de Silvestro). The race was suspended for 45 minutes before the field completed two more laps under the Safety Car before the race was declared under time-certain conditions, with van Gisbergen winning the race after passing Mostert before the incident occurred. McLaughlin finished down in 14th having accidentally driven into the pit-lane as opposed to the grid in the red-flag period. Points were initially awarded to the fifteen classified finishers but were later rescinded.

== Results ==
=== Race 3 ===
==== Qualifying ====
Pos.	No.	Driver	Team	Car	Time
1	17	(New Zealand) Scott McLaughlin	DJR Team Penske	Ford FG X Falcon	0:57.4178
2	55	(Australia) Chaz Mostert	Rod Nash Racing	Ford FG X Falcon	0:57.8003
3	97	(New Zealand) Shane van Gisbergen	Triple Eight Race Engineering	Holden VF Commodore	0:57.8153
4	9	(Australia) David Reynolds	Erebus Motorsport	Holden VF Commodore	0:57.8951
5	88	(Australia) Jamie Whincup	Triple Eight Race Engineering	Holden VF Commodore	0:57.9109
6	888	(Australia) Craig Lowndes	Triple Eight Race Engineering	Holden VF Commodore	0:57.9444
7	99	(Australia) Dale Wood	Erebus Motorsport	Holden VF Commodore	0:57.9901
8	56	(Australia) Jason Bright	Britek Motorsport	Ford FG X Falcon	0:58.0375
9	7	(Australia) Todd Kelly	Nissan Motorsport	Nissan Altima L33	0:58.0512
10	5	(Australia) Mark Winterbottom	Prodrive Racing Australia	Ford FG X Falcon	0:58.1741
11	12	(New Zealand) Fabian Coulthard	DJR Team Penske	Ford FG X Falcon	0:58.1922
12	14	(Australia) Tim Slade	Brad Jones Racing	Holden VF Commodore	0:58.2340
13	6	(Australia) Cam Waters	Prodrive Racing Australia	Ford FG X Falcon	0:58.2450
14	15	(Australia) Rick Kelly	Nissan Motorsport	Nissan Altima L33	0:58.2471
15	21	(Australia) Tim Blanchard	Tim Blanchard Racing	Holden VF Commodore	0:58.2766
16	33	(Australia) Garth Tander	Garry Rogers Motorsport	Holden VF Commodore	0:58.2773
17	8	(Australia) Nick Percat	Brad Jones Racing	Holden VF Commodore	0:58.3178
18	34	(Australia) James Moffat	Garry Rogers Motorsport	Holden VF Commodore	0:58.4115
19	2	(Australia) Scott Pye	Walkinshaw Racing	Holden VF Commodore	0:58.6161
20	18	(Australia) Lee Holdsworth	Team 18	Holden VF Commodore	0:58.6895
21	22	(Australia) James Courtney	Walkinshaw Racing	Holden VF Commodore	0:58.7467
22	78	(Switzerland) Simona de Silvestro	Nissan Motorsport	Nissan Altima L33	0:58.9291
23	62	(Australia) Alex Rullo	Lucas Dumbrell Motorsport	Holden VF Commodore	0:59.0880
24	23	(Australia) Michael Caruso	Nissan Motorsport	Nissan Altima L33	0:59.0996
25	19	(Australia) Will Davison	Tekno Autosports	Holden VF Commodore	1:00.2153
EXC	3	(Australia) Taz Douglas	Lucas Dumbrell Motorsport	Holden VF Commodore	Time excluded

==== Race ====
Pos.	No.	Driver	Team	Laps	Time/Retired	Grid	Points
1	97	(New Zealand) Shane van Gisbergen	Triple Eight Race Engineering	4	54min 29.0032sec	3	^{‡}
2	88	(Australia) Jamie Whincup	Triple Eight Race Engineering	4	+0.3952	5	
3	888	(Australia) Craig Lowndes	Triple Eight Race Engineering	4	+0.7230	6	
4	9	(Australia) David Reynolds	Erebus Motorsport	4	+1.2641	4	
5	55	(Australia) Chaz Mostert	Rod Nash Racing	4	+1.7370	2	
6	56	(Australia) Jason Bright	Britek Motorsport	4	+2.1496	8	
7	5	(Australia) Mark Winterbottom	Prodrive Racing Australia	4	+2.7013	10	
8	99	(Australia) Dale Wood	Erebus Motorsport	4	+3.4304	7	
9	7	(Australia) Todd Kelly	Nissan Motorsport	4	+3.9659	9	
10	6	(Australia) Cam Waters	Prodrive Racing Australia	4	+4.5085	13	
11	12	(New Zealand) Fabian Coulthard	DJR Team Penske	4	+5.1666	11	
12	18	(Australia) Lee Holdsworth	Team 18	4	+5.8930	20	
13	23	(Australia) Michael Caruso	Nissan Motorsport	4	+6.3654	24	
14	17	(New Zealand) Scott McLaughlin	DJR Team Penske	4	+6.9807	1	
15	78	(Switzerland) Simona de Silvestro	Nissan Motorsport	4	+7.5535	22	
Ret	15	(Australia) Rick Kelly	Nissan Motorsport	1	Accident	14	
Ret	14	(Australia) Tim Slade	Brad Jones Racing	1	Accident	12	
Ret	33	(Australia) Garth Tander	Garry Rogers Motorsport	1	Accident	16	
Ret	8	(Australia) Nick Percat	Brad Jones Racing	1	Accident	17	
Ret	21	(Australia) Tim Blanchard	Tim Blanchard Racing	1	Accident	15	
Ret	34	(Australia) James Moffat	Garry Rogers Motorsport	1	Accident	18	
Ret	2	(Australia) Scott Pye	Walkinshaw Racing	1	Accident	19	
Ret	22	(Australia) James Courtney	Walkinshaw Racing	1	Accident	21	
Ret	62	(Australia) Alex Rullo	Lucas Dumbrell Motorsport	1	Accident	23	
Ret	19	(Australia) Will Davison	Tekno Autosports	1	Accident	25	
Ret	3	(Australia) Taz Douglas	Lucas Dumbrell Motorsport	1	Accident	26	

^‡ As the completed race distance was less than 75% of its original designation, no points were awarded.

=== Race 4 ===
==== Qualifying ====
Pos.	No.	Driver	Team	Car	Time
1	88	(Australia) Jamie Whincup	Triple Eight Race Engineering	Holden VF Commodore	0:58.3971
2	17	(New Zealand) Scott McLaughlin	DJR Team Penske	Ford FG X Falcon	0:58.6678
3	55	(Australia) Chaz Mostert	Rod Nash Racing	Ford FG X Falcon	0:58.7079
4	14	(Australia) Tim Slade	Brad Jones Racing	Holden VF Commodore	0:58.8794
5	97	(New Zealand) Shane van Gisbergen	Triple Eight Race Engineering	Holden VF Commodore	0:58.9093
6	12	(New Zealand) Fabian Coulthard	DJR Team Penske	Ford FG X Falcon	0:59.1030
7	7	(Australia) Todd Kelly	Nissan Motorsport	Nissan Altima L33	0:59.1156
8	888	(Australia) Craig Lowndes	Triple Eight Race Engineering	Holden VF Commodore	0:59.1516
9	9	(Australia) David Reynolds	Erebus Motorsport	Holden VF Commodore	0:59.1881
10	6	(Australia) Cam Waters	Prodrive Racing Australia	Ford FG X Falcon	0:59.1974
11	18	(Australia) Lee Holdsworth	Team 18	Holden VF Commodore	0:59.2207
12	5	(Australia) Mark Winterbottom	Prodrive Racing Australia	Ford FG X Falcon	0:59.2281
13	23	(Australia) Michael Caruso	Nissan Motorsport	Nissan Altima L33	0:59.2682
14	33	(Australia) Garth Tander	Garry Rogers Motorsport	Holden VF Commodore	0:59.4243
15	2	(Australia) Scott Pye	Walkinshaw Racing	Holden VF Commodore	0:59.4861
16	8	(Australia) Nick Percat	Brad Jones Racing	Holden VF Commodore	0:59.5786
17	56	(Australia) Jason Bright	Britek Motorsport	Ford FG X Falcon	0:59.6093
18	99	(Australia) Dale Wood	Erebus Motorsport	Holden VF Commodore	0:59.6364
19	34	(Australia) James Moffat	Garry Rogers Motorsport	Holden VF Commodore	0:59.7258
20	78	(Switzerland) Simona de Silvestro	Nissan Motorsport	Nissan Altima L33	0:59.9941
21	21	(Australia) Tim Blanchard	Tim Blanchard Racing	Holden VF Commodore	1:00.2586
-	62	(Australia) Alex Rullo	Lucas Dumbrell Motorsport	Holden VF Commodore	No Time

==== Race ====
Pos	No.	Driver	Team	Laps	Time / Retired	Grid	Points
1	12	(New Zealand) Fabian Coulthard	DJR Team Penske	76	1hr 23min 36.5118sec	6	150
2	17	(New Zealand) Scott McLaughlin	DJR Team Penske	76	+ 0.6906 s	2	138
3	88	(Australia) Jamie Whincup	Triple Eight Race Engineering	76	+ 1.1425 s	1	129
4	888	(Australia) Craig Lowndes	Triple Eight Race Engineering	76	+ 1.5404 s	8	120
5	9	(Australia) David Reynolds	Erebus Motorsport	76	+ 2.1798 s	9	111
6	6	(Australia) Cam Waters	Prodrive Racing Australia	76	+ 2.8738 s	10	102
7	55	(Australia) Chaz Mostert	Rod Nash Racing	76	+ 3.2336 s	3	96
8	14	(Australia) Tim Slade	Brad Jones Racing	76	+ 4.5562 s	4	90
9	97	(New Zealand) Shane van Gisbergen	Triple Eight Race Engineering	76	+ 4.8085 s	5	84
10	33	(Australia) Garth Tander	Garry Rogers Motorsport	76	+ 5.3104 s	14	78
11	8	(Australia) Nick Percat	Brad Jones Racing	76	+ 5.5128 s	16	72
12	2	(Australia) Scott Pye	Walkinshaw Racing	76	+ 6.0487 s	15	69
13	5	(Australia) Mark Winterbottom	Prodrive Racing Australia	76	+ 6.6048 s	12	66
14	99	(Australia) Dale Wood	Erebus Motorsport	76	+ 7.5451 s	18	63
15	78	(Switzerland) Simona de Silvestro	Nissan Motorsport	76	+ 7.9248 s	20	60
16	23	(Australia) Michael Caruso	Nissan Motorsport	75	+ 1 lap	13	57
17	18	(Australia) Lee Holdsworth	Team 18	73	+ 3 laps	11	54
18	7	(Australia) Todd Kelly	Nissan Motorsport	72	+ 4 laps	7	51
19	34	(Australia) James Moffat	Garry Rogers Motorsport	70	+ 6 laps	19	48
Ret	62	(Australia) Alex Rullo	Lucas Dumbrell Motorsport	62	Retired	22	
Ret	21	(Australia) Tim Blanchard	Tim Blanchard Racing	41	Retired	21	
Ret	56	(Australia) Jason Bright	Britek Motorsport	3	Retired	17	
DNS	3	(Australia) Taz Douglas	Lucas Dumbrell Motorsport		Did Not Start		
DNS	15	(Australia) Rick Kelly	Nissan Motorsport		Did Not Start		
DNS	19	(Australia) Will Davison	Tekno Autosports		Did Not Start		
DNS	22	(Australia) James Courtney	Walkinshaw Racing		Did Not Start		
