= Boost Mobile (Australia) =

Australian mobile network operator

Boost Mobile Australia
- Trade name: Boost Mobile
- Type: Subsidiary
- Industry: Wireless telecommunications
- Founded: 1 August 2000; 26 years ago
- Founder: Peter Adderton
- Headquarters: Sydney, New South Wales, Australia
- Area served: Australia
- Parent: Telstra
- Website: www.boost.com.au

Boost Mobile Australia is an Australian mobile virtual network operator (MVNO) which offers wireless services on the Telstra network. Founded in 2000, Telstra entered an agreement to acquire the company in December 2024.

== History ==
Boost Mobile was founded by Peter Adderton in Sydney, New South Wales, Australia in 2000. Optus began licensing the Boost Mobile brand that same year. Paul Keating, former Prime Minister of Australia invested $500,000 for a 29% shareholding.

In 2001, a joint venture between Adderton, Craig Cooper, Kirt McMaster and Nextel brought the Boost Mobile brand to the United States. In 2003, Nextel acquired full ownership of Boost Mobile in the United States, becoming the sole owner of its operations and separating the brand from Boost Mobile Australia.

In 2012, Optus ended its business relationship with Boost; they subsequently switched resell access to the Telstra network, with Telstra reportedly "looking to chase the youth market".

In March 2013, Boost began to offer products and services under the Boost Pre-paid Mobile brand as an MVNO hosted on the Telstra Next G network. Prior to its acquisition by Telstra, it was the only Telstra MVNO with access to the full Telstra mobile network across regional/rural Australia.

Boost Mobile launched a program selling refurbished devices in 2019.

In May 2022, Boost began rolling out 5G service access to all customers with a compatible service and device.

In February 2024, Boost began provisioning eSIMs through their mobile applications. eSIMs were made available for both existing and new Boost Mobile services on iOS and Android smartphones that support eSIM functionality.

In December 2024, Telstra announced it had agreed to terms to acquire Boost Mobile.

== Leadership ==
Warren Hardy served as Boost Mobile's CEO from March 2017 until his retirement in July 2024. The role was then handed over to Jason Haynes who served as CEO of Boost Mobile Australia from July 2024, having previously held roles as General Manager and Chief Marketing Officer for more than seven years. Boost Mobile is led by Bobby Geldens, who was appointed as CEO of Boost Mobile in Australian in December 2024 following Telstra's acquisition of the brand.

== Marketing ==
Boost Mobile's marketing strategy focuses on a youth-orientated approach. A "Works Its Arse Off" campaign was launched in late 2025 alongside Boost Mobile's 25th anniversary celebrations. The campaign was executed across a broad media mix, including out-of-home (OOH), broadcast video on demand (BVOD), YouTube, and major sponsorships such as the Gold Coast 500, supported by a high-impact, youth-oriented creative approach.

=== Criticism ===
In June 2010, Boost Mobile launched a viral marketing campaign that purported to identify text messaging disorders in order to bring attention to Boost Mobile's offer of 100 texts for one dollar. Australian television programme Media Watch criticized both the campaign itself and certain Australian media outlets that had failed to uncover the underlying marketing campaign, reporting the disorders as straight news. The Age was one of the few publications to recognise that the campaign was a "ruse ... to get the company's name mentioned in the media." As part of the campaign Boost Mobile cited an academic paper co-authored by Dr. Shari Walsh of the Queensland University of Technology. However, Dr. Walsh stated that her paper did not identify any texting disorders and that Boost Mobile was not accurately representing her research.

== Sponsorships ==
Boost Mobile has sponsored motorsports and youth-focused action sports, and targets its brand and products at younger demographics. Boost Mobile runs an athlete ambassador program focused on action sport such as surfing, supercross, and skateboarding.

Since the company was founded, Boost Mobile has maintained a presence in surfing through long-term sponsorships and partnerships with the World Surf League (WSL) and Surfing Australia, as well as events such as the Boost Mobile Pro at Snapper Rocks in 2023. Boost Mobile has worked with the World Surf League (WSL), renewing its role as the Official Telecommunications Partner for the WSL in 2026. Boost Mobile has also sponsored surfing athletes including Sally Fitzgibbons and Jack Robinson.

The company's involvement in skateboarding includes sponsorship of events like the Globe Australia Pro 2024, Mega Ranch Junior Jam and Street League Skateboarding (SLS) Sydney. Boost Mobile sponsors a team of skateboarding talent called the Boost Mobile Skate Squad, featuring Chloe Covell and Jesse Parkinson.

In 2018, Boost Mobile formed a partnership with the American-based Stadium Super Trucks to grow the series' presence in Australia. The following year, after the series and the Confederation of Australian Motor Sport reached a three-year commercial rights agreement, the series was branded the Boost Mobile Super Trucks for Australian races.

In 2019, Boost Mobile was the naming rights sponsor of Garry Rogers Motorsport in the Australian Supercars Championship. In 2020 and 2021, Boost Mobile sponsored James Courtney in a Tickford Racing Ford Mustang. In 2021 it also sponsored Brodie Kostecki in an Erebus Motorsport Holden Commodore ZB.

In 2022, Boost Mobile became the naming rights sponsor of both Erebus Motorsport Commodores. That sponsorship lasted only one season.

In February 2026, Boost Mobile and Supercars announced an expanded multi-year partnership extending through to 2028. This deal included Boost's association with the Boost Mobile Gold Coast 500, where it retains naming rights. Boost Mobile also supports innovation and fan engagement in motorsports, as sponsors of the Boost Mobile Pole Award and Top Ten Shootout, as well as its sponsorship of Boost Mobile Race Radio and the Motorsport Technical Team.

Boost Mobile also has naming rights with the Boost Mobile AUSX SuperCross Championship and Boost Mobile AUSX Open.

== Awards ==
In 2025, Boost Mobile was awarded the WeMoney Telco Award for Best Quality Prepaid and Best Annual Prepaid Plan, and the Mozo People's Choice Award for Network Reliability in 2021, and was recognised as a 'Reliable Brand' in Finder's Customer Satisfaction Awards in 2026. In 2026, Boost Mobile was awarded the WeMoney Telco Award for best prepaid mobile provider.
