= 2003 Australian Formula Ford Championship =

Motor racing competition

Seasons
- ← 2002 2004 →

The 2003 Ford Racing Australian Formula Ford Championship was an Australian motor racing competition for Formula Ford racing cars. It was managed by the Formula Ford Association Inc. and was recognised by the Confederation of Australian Motor Sport as a National Championship. The title, which was the eleventh Australian Formula Ford Championship, was won by Neil McFadyen driving a Van Diemen RF94.

== Teams and drivers ==
Team	Chassis	No	Driver	Rounds
Bryce Francis Automotive	Van Diemen RF02	2	(Australia) Brett Francis	All
Sonic Motor Racing Services (Garry Rogers Motorsport)	Van Diemen RF01	3	(Australia) Glen Hastings	All
Sonic Motor Racing Services (Garry Rogers Motorsport)	Van Diemen RF01	5	(Australia) Tony Pugliese	All
Sonic Motor Racing Services (Garry Rogers Motorsport)	Van Diemen RF01	15	(Australia) Michael Trimble	All
Factory Enterprises	Spectrum 09	4	(Australia) Justin Cotter	2–3, 5–6, 8
Mike Ceveri Team Racing	Van Diemen RF01	8	(Australia) Mark Ceveri	1–4, 6–8
Arad Part Ltd.	Van Diemen RF03	9	(Australia) Bryce Washington	All
Borland Racing Developments	Spectrum	11	(Australia) Tim Macrow	All
James Small Racing	Mygale SJ2001	12	(Australia) James Small	1, 3, 6, 8
Fastlane Racing	Van Diemen RF01	16	(Australia) Mark Douglas	4
Fastlane Racing	Van Diemen RF94	18	(Australia) Dean Fiore	1, 3–4
Fastlane Racing	Van Diemen RF92	30	(Australia) Paul Fiore	4
Fastlane Racing	Van Diemen RF92	31	(Australia) Adrian Corp	4
Fastlane Racing	Van Diemen RF92	34	(Australia) Craig Jorgensen	4
Fastlane Racing	Van Diemen RF90	40	(Australia) Todd Fiore	4
Gilmour Developments	Van Diemen RF96b	17	(Australia) Chris Gilmour	5
Simmon Derrick Racing	Van Diemen RF01	19	(Australia) Anthony Preston	1–3, 5–6
Michael Henderson	Spectrum 07	20	(Australia) Michael Henderson	4
Anglo Australian Motorsport	Van Diemen RF94	21	(Australia) Joel Spychala	6
Anglo Australian Motorsport	Van Diemen RF94	23	(Australia) David Sieders	6, 8
Bizar Software	Spectrum 06	22	(Australia) Terry Kerr	3, 8
Steel Building Systems	Van Diemen RF92	24	(Australia) Tim Slade	1, 3–8
MR Racing	Spectrum 06	25	(Australia) Daniel Reinhardt	1–3
All Purpose Garages/Sagacity	Spectrum 07	26	(Australia) Matthew Tate	8
Interpak Racing	Swift SC94F	27	(Australia) Stephen Austin	2
Minda Motorsport	Swift SC97K	27	(Australia) Dominic Kennedy	7
Collex, Davies Craig	Van Diemen RF94	28	(Australia) Cade Southall	1–4, 6, 8
BETA	Van Diemen RF91	29	(Australia) Grant Doulman	6
Wimmer Soft Drinks	Van Diemen RF02	32	(Australia) Kurt Wimmer	All
Corporate Fleet Control	Van Diemen	33	(Australia) John Pettit	1–2, 6, 8
Steve Baxter	Van Diemen RF92	33	(Australia) Steve Baxter	4
S & D Welch Removals	Mygale	34	(Australia) Glenn Welch	6
Cameron Spence Motorsport	Spectrum	35	(Australia) Cameron Spence	1, 3, 7–8
Dowling Real Estate / Hawks Nest	Van Diemen RF02	36	(Australia) Clayton Pine	4–8
Nirvana Body Clinics	Van Diemen	37	(Australia) Tony LeMessurier	All
Rupert Collins Racing	Spectrum 06	43	(Australia) Adam Hickey	1–3, 5–8
Holts Cranes	Van Diemen RF96	44	(Australia) Mark Holt	5
Ian Dyk Racing	Van Diemen	45	(Australia) Ian Dyk	1–3, 5–8
CC Racing	Spectrum 09b	48	(Australia) Clint Cathcart	1–3, 5–6
Just Cars Magazine	Spectrum 09	50	(Australia) Mark West	1
Just Cars Magazine	Spectrum 09	50	(Australia) Adam Macrow	6
VIP Petfoods	Vector T94	53	(Australia) Kent Quinn	5
William Hall	Spectrum 06	55	(Australia) William Hall	4
Vagelis Cafe & Bar	Van Diemen RF93	57	(Australia) Daniel Pappas	1–3, 5–7
Speedzone/Tankworld/Antunes	Van Diemen RF94	59	(Australia) Neil McFadyen	All
Supercheap Auto Racing	Spectrum 09b	66	(Australia) Adam Graham	1–3, 5–8
Smeaton Plumbing	Spectrum 07	72	(Australia) Rachel Smeaton	5–6
Nomad Racing	Spectrum	74	(Australia) Mark McNally	1, 4, 7
Viking/BFI Fire Equipment	Swift 93K	77	(Australia) Graham Knuckey	1–3, 6–7
O'Brien Motorsport	Van Diemen RF03	79	(Australia) Shannon O'Brien	2–8
Minerva NET Internet	Spectrum 09	83	(Australia) Veijo Phillips	8
Justin Locke	Van Diemen RF95	88	(Australia) Justin Locke	4
Brook Motorsport	Van Diemen RF94	89	(Australia) Stephen Borness	1–3, 5
John McCowan	Van Diemen RF90	92	(Australia) John McCowan	4
Kart-Equip/Nexus Consulting	Van Diemen RF02	96	(Australia) David Reynolds	All
Eastern Creek Karting Raceway	Swift SC95K	98	(Australia) Troy Hunt	6

== Race calendar ==
The championship was contested over eight rounds with two races per round.

Round	Circuit	Dates	Supporting	Map
1	(Victoria (state)) Phillip Island Grand Prix Circuit	11–13 April	V8 Supercar Championship Series	2003 Australian Formula Ford Championship is located in Australia
2	(New South Wales) Eastern Creek Raceway	2–4 May	V8 Supercar Championship Series; Konica V8 Supercar Series	2003 Australian Formula Ford Championship is located in Australia
3	(Victoria (state)) Winton Motor Raceway	23–25 May	V8 Supercar Championship Series	2003 Australian Formula Ford Championship is located in Australia
4	(Western Australia) Wanneroo Raceway	6–8 June	V8 Supercar Championship Series	2003 Australian Formula Ford Championship is located in Australia
5	Queensland Raceway	18–20 July	V8 Supercar Championship Series	2003 Australian Formula Ford Championship is located in Australia
6	(New South Wales) Oran Park Raceway	15–17 August	V8 Supercar Championship Series	2003 Australian Formula Ford Championship is located in Australia
7	(South Australia) Mallala Motor Sport Park	30–31 August	Konica V8 Supercar Series	2003 Australian Formula Ford Championship is located in Australia
8	(Victoria (state)) Sandown Raceway	12–14 September	V8 Supercar Championship Series; Sandown 500	2003 Australian Formula Ford Championship is located in Australia

== Season summary ==
Rd	Race	Circuit	Pole position	Fastest lap	Winning driver	Winning team	Round Winner
1	1	(Victoria (state)) Phillip Island Grand Prix Circuit	(Australia) Neil McFadyen	(Australia) Brett Francis	(Australia) Tony Pugliese	Sonic Motor Racing Services	(Australia) Tony Pugliese
1	2	(Victoria (state)) Phillip Island Grand Prix Circuit	Race cancelled due to inclement weather				(Australia) Tony Pugliese
2	1	(New South Wales) Eastern Creek Raceway	(Australia) Tony Pugliese	(Australia) Tony Pugliese	(Australia) Tony Pugliese	Sonic Motor Racing Services	(Australia) Tony Pugliese
2	2	(New South Wales) Eastern Creek Raceway		(Australia) Brett Francis	(Australia) Tony Pugliese	Sonic Motor Racing Services	(Australia) Tony Pugliese
3	1	(New South Wales) Winton Motor Raceway	(Australia) Glen Hastings	(Australia) Glen Hastings	(Australia) Glen Hastings	Sonic Motor Racing Services	(Australia) Glen Hastings
3	2	(New South Wales) Winton Motor Raceway		(Australia) Glen Hastings	(Australia) Glen Hastings	Sonic Motor Racing Services	(Australia) Glen Hastings
4	1	(Western Australia) Wanneroo Raceway	(Australia) Glen Hastings	(Australia) Dean Fiore	(Australia) Glen Hastings	Sonic Motor Racing Services	(Australia) Glen Hastings
4	2	(Western Australia) Wanneroo Raceway		(Australia) Glen Hastings	(Australia) Glen Hastings	Sonic Motor Racing Services	(Australia) Glen Hastings
5	1	Queensland Raceway	(Australia) Tony Pugliese	(Australia) Glen Hastings	(Australia) Tony Pugliese	Sonic Motor Racing Services	(Australia) Glen Hastings
5	2	Queensland Raceway		(Australia) Glen Hastings	(Australia) Glen Hastings	Sonic Motor Racing Services	(Australia) Glen Hastings
6	1	(New South Wales) Oran Park Raceway	(Australia) Neil McFadyen	(Australia) Adam Macrow	(Australia) Neil McFadyen	Speedzone / Tankworld / Antune	(Australia) Neil McFadyen
6	2	(New South Wales) Oran Park Raceway		(Australia) Glen Hastings	(Australia) Neil McFadyen	Speedzone / Tankworld / Antune	(Australia) Neil McFadyen
7	1	(South Australia) Mallala Motor Sport Park	(Australia) Neil McFadyen	(Australia) Glen Hastings	(Australia) Neil McFadyen	Speedzone / Tankworld / Antune	(Australia) Neil McFadyen
7	2	(South Australia) Mallala Motor Sport Park		(Australia) Neil McFadyen	(Australia) Neil McFadyen	Speedzone / Tankworld / Antune	(Australia) Neil McFadyen
8	1	(Victoria (state)) Sandown Raceway	(Australia) James Small	(Australia) Glen Hastings	(Australia) Glen Hastings	Sonic Motor Racing Services	(Australia) James Small
8	2	(Victoria (state)) Sandown Raceway		(Australia) James Small	(Australia) James Small	James Small Racing	(Australia) James Small

== Results ==
Position	1st	2nd	3rd	4th	5th	6th	7th	8th	9th	10th	Pole
Points	20	16	14	12	10	8	6	4	2	1	1

Pos.	Driver	(Victoria (state)) PHI		(New South Wales) EAS		(Victoria (state)) WIN		(Western Australia) WAN		(Queensland) QUE		(New South Wales) ORA		(South Australia) MAL		(Victoria (state)) SAN		Pts
Pos.	Driver	R1	R2	R1	R2	R1	R2	R1	R2	R1	R2	R1	R2	R1	R2	R1	R2	Pts
1	(Australia) Neil McFadyen	2	C	4	5	2	3	3	3	4	3	1	1	1	1	6	5	223
2	(Australia) Glen Hastings	6	C	3	3	1	1	1	1	2	1	18	8	4	2	1	Ret	206
2	(Australia) Tony Pugliese	1	C	1	1	3	2	2	5	1	Ret	2	2	2	Ret	7	3	206
4	(Australia) Brett Francis	5	C	2	2	13	14	4	2	3	2	7	7	6	4	3	8	150
5	(Australia) Bryce Washington	10	C	13	11	5	5	7	6	6	Ret	6	5	3	3	5	4	111
6	(Australia) Tim Macrow	4	C	6	4	16	7	11	8	14	7	4	4	5	5	20	16	92
7	(Australia) Justin Cotter	3	C	7	6	6	9			5	4	Ret	Ret			13	Ret	60
7	(Australia) Ian Dyk	Ret	C	5	8	18	12			18	Ret	8	6	8	9	4	2	60
9	(Australia) Michael Trimble	Ret	C	9	7	4	4	6	9	Ret	8			7	Ret	Ret	12	52
10	(Australia) James Small	9	C			8	6					Ret	DNS			2	1	51
11	(Australia) Adam Macrow											3	3					28
12	(Australia) David Reynolds	7	C	Ret	Ret	27	16	12	Ret	8	10	Ret	15	9	6	10	10	23
13	(Australia) Dean Fiore	21	C			22	13	5	4									22
14	(Australia) Kurt Wimmer	12	C	10	22	9	15	13	Ret	7	5	10	13	12	13	18	11	20
15	(Australia) Cade Southall	8	C	11	12	7	8	9	10			Ret	20			15	Ret	17
16	(Australia) Anthony Preston	14	C	8	9	26	21			10	9	9	9					13
16	(Australia) Mark Ceveri	Ret	C	17	19	10	11	17	15			Ret	Ret	11	Ret	8	6	13
18	(Australia) John Pettit	13	C	12	10	17	17					5	Ret			14	Ret	11
18	(Australia) Daniel Pappas	16	C	15	13	14	DNS			11	17	Ret	18	10	8	23	7	11
20	(Australia) Paul Fiore							8	7									10
20	(Australia) Clayton Pyne							Ret	22	9	6	15	12	13	14	11	Ret	10
22	(Australia) Tim Slade	19	C			15	25	16	12	12	Ret	14	14	14	7	16	Ret	6
23	(Australia) Adam Hickey	15	C	18	15	11	10			16	11	Ret	Ret	Ret	11	Ret	9	3
24	(Australia) Adam Graham	20	C	23	17	25	22			13	13	11	10	15	10	12	Ret	2
24	(Australia) David Sieders											13	11			9	DNS	2
26	(Australia) Steve Baxter							10	11									1
-	(Australia) Daniel Reinhardt	11	C	16	14	12	24											0
-	(Australia) Mark McNally	17	C					Ret	14					18	12			0
-	(Australia) Shannon O'Brien	18	C	21	20	24	20	15	17	Ret	14	Ret	23	16	Ret	Ret	Ret	0
-	(Australia) Stephen Borness	22	C	14	24	19	23			17	16							0
-	(Australia) Cameron Spence	23	C			23	26							20	16	22	14	0
-	(Australia) Tony LeMessurier	24	C	19	18	21	19	20	18	21	20	Ret	DNS	17	15	21	15	0
-	(Australia) Graham Knuckey	25	C	22	23	Ret	Ret					Ret	24	Ret	17			0
-	(Australia) Clint Cathcart	Ret	C	20	16	28	18			19	15	17	22					0
-	(Australia) Stephen Austin			24	21													0
-	(Australia) Terry Kerr					20	Ret									17	Ret	0
-	(Australia) Todd Fiore							14	13									0
-	(Australia) Michael Henderson							18	16									0
-	(Australia) Mark Douglas							19	21									0
-	(Australia) Adrian Corp							21	23									0
-	(Australia) Craig Jorgensen							22	24									0
-	(Australia) John McCowan							23	20									0
-	(Australia) Justin Locke							Ret	19									0
-	(Australia) William Hall							Ret	Ret									0
-	(Australia) Chris Gilmour									15	12							0
-	(Australia) Mark Holt									20	18							0
-	(Australia) Rachel Smeaton									22	19	20	25					0
-	(Australia) Kent Quinn									Ret	Ret							0
-	(Australia) Glenn Welch											12	16					0
-	(Australia) Joel Spychala											16	17					0
-	(Australia) Grant Doulman											19	21					0
-	(Australia) Troy Hunt											Ret	19					0
-	(Australia) Dominic Kennedy													19	18			0
-	(Australia) Veijo Phillips															19	Ret	0
-	(Australia) Matthew Tate															Ret	13	0
Pos.	Driver	(Victoria (state)) PHI		(New South Wales) EAS		(Victoria (state)) WIN		(Western Australia) WAN		(Queensland) QUE		(New South Wales) ORA		(South Australia) MAL		(Victoria (state)) SAN		Pts
Pos.	Driver	R1	R2	R1	R2	R1	R2	R1	R2	R1	R2	R1	R2	R1	R2	R1	R2	Pts

=== Avon Rookie of the Year ===
- The Avon Rookie of the Year title was awarded to Bryce Washington.

=== Notes ===
- Race 2 of Round 1 at Phillip Island was cancelled after rain left the circuit in an unsafe condition.
- Under Australian Formula Ford regulations, all cars were required to use a Ford 1600cc crossflow engine.
