= 2002 Australian Formula Ford Championship =

Motor racing competition

Seasons
- ← 2001 2003 →

The 2002 Australian Formula Ford Championship was an Australian motor racing competition for Formula Ford racing cars. It was authorised by the Confederation of Australian Motor Sport and was the tenth Australian Formula Ford Championship.

The championship was won by Jamie Whincup driving a Van Diemen RF01.

== Championship summary ==
Heading into the season, Jamie Whincup was touted as a championship favourite. Heavily favoured to carry forward the form shown in his debut year the previous season, he, along with teammate Marcus Marshall at Sonic Motor Racing Services (running under the Garry Rogers Motorsport banner), were the pacesetters throughout the championship. However, rookie Mark Winterbottom would prove to be a serious challenger for the championship, driving with Borland Racing Developments, and would herald the first of many battles between him and Whincup in the years to come.

Whincup would ultimately emerge victorious at seasons end with Winterbottom finishing second overall and Marshall in third.

== Teams and drivers ==
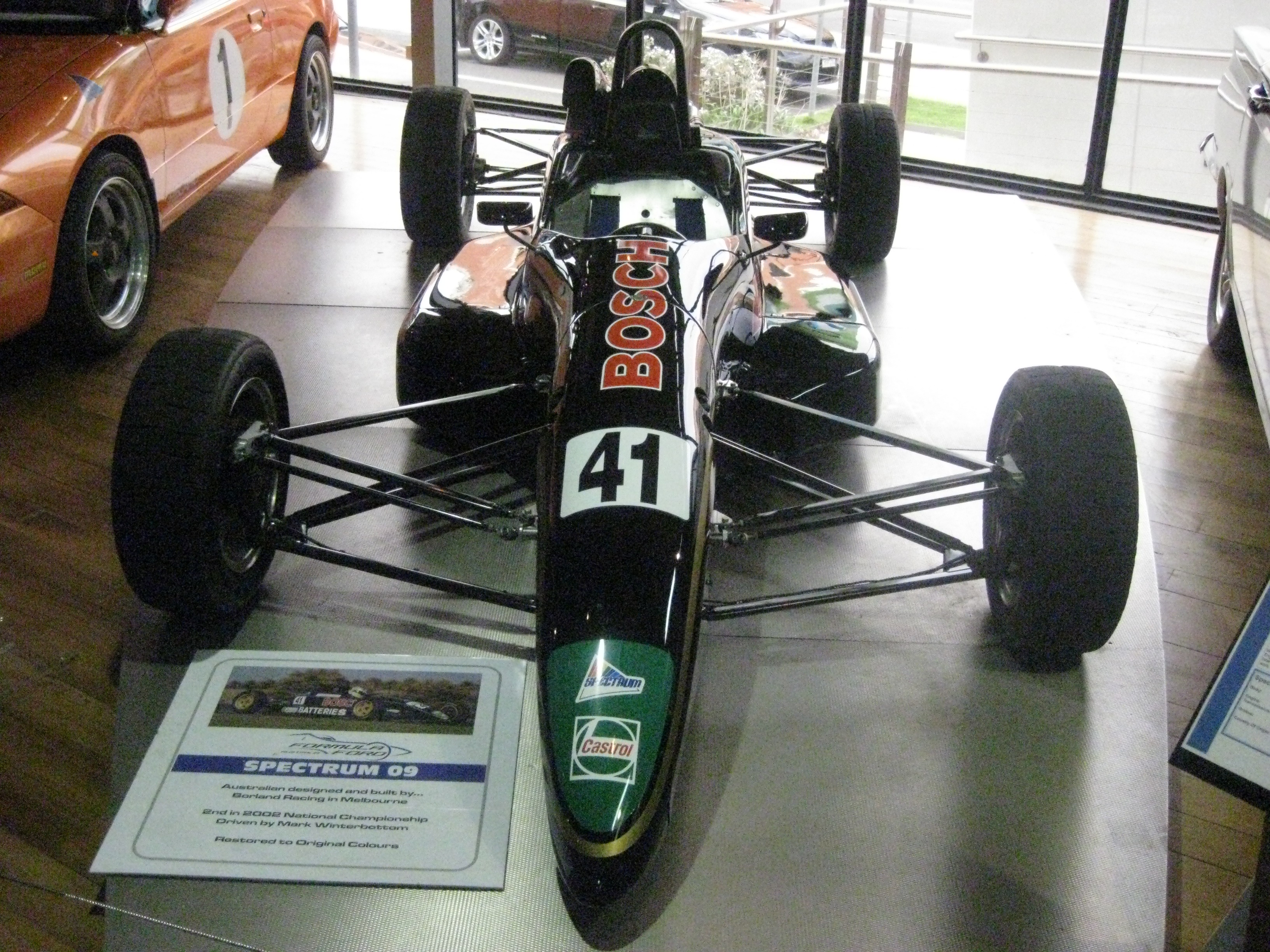
The Spectrum 09 in which Mark Winterbottom placed 2nd in the championship

| Team | Chassis | No | Driver | Rounds |
|---|---|---|---|---|
| Sonic Motor Racing Services (Garry Rogers Motorsport) | Van Diemen RF01 | 3 | (Australia) Jamie Whincup | All |
| Sonic Motor Racing Services (Garry Rogers Motorsport) | Van Diemen RF01 | 7 | (Australia) Marcus Marshall | All |
| Brad Jones Racing | Van Diemen RF02 | 6 | (Australia) Andrew Jones | All |
| Hanger Racing | Spectrum 09 | 10 | (Australia) Ty Hanger | 5 |
| Anglo Australian Motorsport | Van Diemen RF94 | 13 | (Australia) Damien Meyer | 5 |
| Tekno Autosports | Van Diemen RF01 | 14 | (Australia) Barton Mawer | All |
| James Small Racing | Mygale SJ01 | 15 | (Australia) James Small | 2–5, 7 |
| MinervaNET Motorsport | Spectrum 09 | 18 | (Australia) Veijo Phillips | 1–3, 6–7 |
| Chamberlain Racing | Spectrum 06b | 22 | (Australia) Richard Chamberlain | 1–7 |
| Gilmour Developments | Van Diemen RF96 | 25 | (Australia) Chris Gilmour | 8 |
| T.R.E. Motorsport | Spectrum 07 | 26 | (Australia) Matthew Tate | 1–2 |
| Fastlane Racing | Van Diemen RF94 | 26 | (Australia) Mark Douglas | 4 |
| Fastlane Racing | Van Diemen RF90 | 32 | (Australia) Aaron Caratti | 4 |
| Fastlane Racing | Van Diemen RF94 | 59 | (Australia) Neil McFadyen | All |
| Fastlane Racing | Van Diemen RF94 | 62 | (Australia) Dean Fiore | 4, 6 |
| Interpak Racing | Swift SC94F | 28 | (Australia) Stephen Austin | 1, 5 |
| Macrow Racing | Spectrum 06b | 28 | (Australia) Tim Macrow | 2, 7 |
| Wimmers Soft Drinks | Van Diemen RF02 | 32 | (Australia) Kurt Wimmer | 1–3, 5 |
| Thomson Ford | Van Diemen RF93 | 33 | (Australia) John Pettit | 1–2, 5 |
| Steve Baxter | Van Diemen RF92 | 33 | (Australia) Steve Baxter | 4 |
| Lowe Racing | Spectrum 06b | 34 | (Australia) Ash Lowe | All |
| Michael Henderson | | 35 | (Australia) Michael Henderson | 4 |
| Thrifty-Link Hardware | Van Diemen RF95 | 36 | (Australia) Mark Ceveri | All |
| Property Solutions Group | Van Diemen RF95 | 40 | (Australia) Kevin Miller | 8 |
| Borland Racing Developments | Spectrum 09 | 41 | (Australia) Mark Winterbottom | All |
| Borland Racing Developments | Spectrum 07 | 69 | (Australia) Matt Wall | 7 |
| Intune Motorsport | Swift SC94F | 42 | (Australia) John Houlder | 1–3, 5, 7–8 |
| Rupert Collins Plastics | Spectrum 06b | 43 | (Australia) Adam Hickey | 2, 7 |
| MC Racing | Spectrum 06 | 44 | (Australia) Matt Cherry | 4 |
| Holts Crane Hire | Van Diemen RF96 | 44 | (Australia) Mark Holt | 8 |
| Pettaras PressCastle Finance | Van Diemen RF98 | 45 | (Australia) Ian Dyk | 5 |
| Jagz Racing | Swift SC93F | 47 | (Australia) Steven Hooton | 4 |
| Simon Wheeler | Van Diemen RF98 | 48 | (Australia) Tim Wheeler | 4 |
| Gregory's Ford | Spectrum 06b | 49 | (Australia) Nick Torelli | 1–3 |
| Eggleston Motorsport | Spectrum 07 | 51 | (Australia) Ben Eggleston | 1–3, 7 |
| VIP Petfoods | Vector MG96 | 53 | (Australia) Kent Quinn | 8 |
| VIP Petfoods | Vector TF94 | 54 | (Australia) Klark Quinn | 8 |
| Apex Motorsport | Van Diemen RF98 | 55 | (Australia) Tony Pugliese | 2, 5–8 |
| Vagelis Cafe & Bar | Van Diemen RF95 | 57 | (Australia) Daniel Pappas | 1–3, 5–8 |
| Swingyde | Van Diemen RF93 | 61 | (Australia) Jordan Ormsby | 1–7 |
| Lansvale Racing Team | Van Diemen RF93 | 63 | (Australia) Grant Ashby | 5, 7–8 |
| Stones Kart Spares | Van Diemen RF96 | 66 | (Australia) Blake Smith | 1–2 |
| AdRad Radiators | Van Diemen RF94 | 66 | (Australia) Bryce Washington | 6 |
| Sean Supanz | Van Diemen RF87 | 67 | (Australia) Sean Supanz | 4 |
| Luke Morton | Van Diemen RF94 | 69 | (Australia) Luke Morton | 4 |
| Factory Enterprises | Spectrum 06b | 71 | (Australia) Justin Cotter | 1–3, 5–8 |
| Nomad Racing | Spectrum 06 | 74 | (Australia) Mark McNally | 4, 6–7 |
| Burford Racing | Van Diemen RF92 | 75 | (Australia) Laurence Burford | 1, 5 |
| Complete Fire | Swift SC93F | 77 | (Australia) Graham Knuckey | 6 |
| Bryce Francis Automotive | Van Diemen RF02 | 82 | (Australia) Brett Francis | All |
| Sita/Marsh | Van Diemen RF94 | 84 | (Australia) Glen Hastings | 2, 6–8 |
| Proteus Cosmetics | Van Diemen RF95 | 87 | (Australia) Tony LeMessurier | 1–3, 6–7 |
| Tim Davies | Van Diemen RF90 | 88 | (Australia) Tim Davies | 4 |
| Southern Titanium | Van Diemen RF90 | 92 | (Australia) John McCowan | 4, 6 |
| Qantas Link/Avis | Van Diemen RF95 | 94 | (Australia) Neil Pollard | 8 |
| Paul Zsidy | Spectrum | 96 | (Australia) David Reynolds | 7 |
| Clive Hartz | Van Diemen RF95 | 98 | (Australia) Clive Hartz | 4 |
| Tony D'Alberto Racing | Mygale SJ00 | 99 | (Australia) Tony D'Alberto | 7 |

== Calendar ==
The championship was contested over an eight-round series with two races per round.

| Round | Circuit | Dates | Supporting | Map |
|---|---|---|---|---|
| 1 | (Victoria (state)) Wakefield Park Raceway | 31 March | Konica V8 Supercar Series | 2002 Australian Formula Ford Championship is located in Australia |
| 2 | (Victoria (state)) Phillip Island Grand Prix Circuit | 5 May | Konica V8 Supercar Series | 2002 Australian Formula Ford Championship is located in Australia |
| 3 | (Australian Capital Territory) Canberra Street Circuit | 9 June | V8 Supercar Championship Series | 2002 Australian Formula Ford Championship is located in Australia |
| 4 | (Western Australia) Wanneroo Raceway | 30 June | V8 Supercar Championship Series | 2002 Australian Formula Ford Championship is located in Australia |
| 5 | (New South Wales) Oran Park Raceway | 27 July | V8 Supercar Championship Series | 2002 Australian Formula Ford Championship is located in Australia |
| 6 | (South Australia) Mallala Motor Sport Park | 4 August | Konica V8 Supercar Series | 2002 Australian Formula Ford Championship is located in Australia |
| 7 | (Victoria (state)) Winton Motor Raceway | 18 August | V8 Supercar Championship Series | 2002 Australian Formula Ford Championship is located in Australia |
| 8 | Queensland Raceway | 14 September | V8 Supercar Championship Series; Queensland 500 | 2002 Australian Formula Ford Championship is located in Australia |

== Championship summary ==
| Rd | Race | Circuit | Pole position | Fastest lap | Winning driver | Winning team | Round Winner |
|---|---|---|---|---|---|---|---|
| 1 | 1 | (New South Wales) Wakefield Park Raceway | | | (Australia) Marcus Marshall | Sonic Motor Racing Services | (Australia) Jamie Whincup |
| 1 | 2 | (New South Wales) Wakefield Park Raceway | | | (Australia) Jamie Whincup | Sonic Motor Racing Services | (Australia) Jamie Whincup |
| 2 | 1 | (Victoria (state)) Phillip Island Grand Prix Circuit | (Australia) Andrew Jones | (Australia) Glen Hastings | (Australia) Jamie Whincup | Sonic Motor Racing Services | (Australia) Jamie Whincup |
| 2 | 2 | (Victoria (state)) Phillip Island Grand Prix Circuit | | (Australia) Mark Winterbottom | (Australia) Jamie Whincup | Sonic Motor Racing Services | (Australia) Jamie Whincup |
| 3 | 1 | (Australian Capital Territory) Canberra Street Circuit | (Australia) Jamie Whincup | (Australia) Jamie Whincup | (Australia) Jamie Whincup | Sonic Motor Racing Services | (Australia) Jamie Whincup |
| 3 | 2 | (Australian Capital Territory) Canberra Street Circuit | | (Australia) Mark Winterbottom | (Australia) Jamie Whincup | Sonic Motor Racing Services | (Australia) Jamie Whincup |
| 4 | 1 | (Western Australia) Wanneroo Raceway | (Australia) Andrew Jones | (Australia) Marcus Marshall | (Australia) Andrew Jones | Brad Jones Racing | (Australia) Jamie Whincup |
| 4 | 2 | (Western Australia) Wanneroo Raceway | | (Australia) Jamie Whincup | (Australia) Jamie Whincup | Sonic Motor Racing Services | (Australia) Jamie Whincup |
| 5 | 1 | (New South Wales) Oran Park Raceway | (Australia) Jamie Whincup | (Australia) Mark Winterbottom | (Australia) Mark Winterbottom | Borland Racing Developments | (Australia) Jamie Whincup |
| 5 | 2 | (New South Wales) Oran Park Raceway | | (Australia) Jamie Whincup | (Australia) Jamie Whincup | Sonic Motor Racing Services | (Australia) Jamie Whincup |
| 6 | 1 | (South Australia) Mallala Motor Sport Park | (Australia) Mark Winterbottom | (Australia) Jamie Whincup | (Australia) Mark Winterbottom | Borland Racing Developments | (Australia) Mark Winterbottom |
| 6 | 2 | (South Australia) Mallala Motor Sport Park | | (Australia) Jamie Whincup | (Australia) Mark Winterbottom | Borland Racing Developments | (Australia) Mark Winterbottom |
| 7 | 1 | (New South Wales) Winton Motor Raceway | (Australia) Jamie Whincup | (Australia) Andrew Jones | (Australia) Marcus Marshall | Sonic Motor Racing Services | (Australia) Marcus Marshall |
| 7 | 2 | (New South Wales) Winton Motor Raceway | | (Australia) Jamie Whincup | (Australia) Marcus Marshall | Sonic Motor Racing Services | (Australia) Marcus Marshall |
| 8 | 1 | Queensland Raceway | (Australia) Jamie Whincup | (Australia) Mark Winterbottom | (Australia) Jamie Whincup | Sonic Motor Racing Services | (Australia) Marcus Marshall |
| 8 | 2 | Queensland Raceway | | (Australia) Mark Winterbottom | (Australia) Marcus Marshall | Sonic Motor Racing Services | (Australia) Marcus Marshall |

== Points system ==
Championship points were awarded at each race on the following basis:

| Position | 1st | 2nd | 3rd | 4th | 5th | 6th | 7th | 8th | 9th | 10th | Pole |
|---|---|---|---|---|---|---|---|---|---|---|---|
| Points | 20 | 16 | 14 | 12 | 10 | 8 | 6 | 4 | 2 | 1 | 1 |

== Championship standings ==
| Pos. | Driver | (New South Wales) Wak. | | (Victoria (state)) Phi. | | (Australian Capital Territory) Can. | | (Western Australia) Wan. | | (New South Wales) Ora. | | (South Australia) Mal. | | (Victoria (state)) Win. | | (Queensland) Que. | | Pen | Pts |
| Pos. | Driver | R1 | R2 | R1 | R2 | R1 | R2 | R1 | R2 | R1 | R2 | R1 | R2 | R1 | R2 | R1 | R2 | Pen | Pts |
|---|---|---|---|---|---|---|---|---|---|---|---|---|---|---|---|---|---|---|---|
| 1 | (Australia) Jamie Whincup | 4 | 1 | 1 | 1 | 1 | 1 | 4 | 1 | 2 | 1 | 2 | 6 | 14 | 3 | 1 | DNS | | 243 |
| 2 | (Australia) Mark Winterbottom | 2 | 2 | 3 | 3 | 4 | 2 | 3 | Ret | 1 | 2 | 1 | 1 | 2 | 2 | 3 | 4 | -10 | 227 |
| 3 | (Australia) Marcus Marshall | 1 | 4 | 2 | 2 | 2 | 3 | 2 | Ret | 12 | 5 | 3 | 3 | 1 | 1 | 2 | 1 | | 224 |
| 4 | (Australia) Neil McFadyen | 7 | 7 | 6 | 6 | 3 | 4 | 5 | 3 | 3 | 6 | Ret | 7 | 3 | 4 | 8 | 3 | | 150 |
| 5 | (Australia) Barton Mawer | 3 | 3 | 4 | 4 | Ret | DNS | 11 | 6 | 4 | 3 | 5 | 9 | 5 | 6 | 7 | 7 | | 128 |
| 6 | (Australia) Andrew Jones | 22 | 9 | Ret | 7 | 6 | 6 | 1 | Ret | 6 | 4 | 4 | 2 | 6 | Ret | 5 | 9 | | 114 |
| 7 | (Australia) Ash Lowe | 13 | Ret | 11 | 11 | 5 | 5 | 9 | 2 | 8 | 18 | 6 | 4 | 9 | 12 | 11 | 8 | | 68 |
| 8 | (Australia) Brett Francis | 9 | 8 | 8 | 9 | 8 | 8 | 8 | Ret | Ret | 11 | Ret | DNS | 8 | 7 | 4 | 2 | | 62 |
| 9 | (Australia) Tony Pugliese | | | 7 | 12 | | | | | 5 | 7 | 15 | 11 | 4 | 5 | 9 | 6 | | 54 |
| 10 | (Australia) Justin Cotter | 5 | 5 | Ret | 16 | 9 | 11 | | | 17 | Ret | 7 | 10 | Ret | DNS | 6 | 5 | | 47 |
| 11 | (Australia) Jordan Ormsby | 10 | 12 | Ret | 13 | 7 | 7 | 7 | 9 | 9 | 8 | Ret | Ret | 12 | 11 | | | | 27 |
| 12 | (Australia) Glen Hastings | | | 5 | 5 | | | | | | | Ret | 8 | Ret | 9 | | | | 26 |
| 13 | (Australia) Dean Fiore | | | | | | | 6 | 4 | | | | | | | | | | 20 |
| = | (Australia) Richard Chamberlain | 6 | 6 | 10 | Ret | 11 | 9 | 16 | Ret | 11 | 12 | 10 | 12 | 15 | DNS | | | | 20 |
| 15 | (Australia) Bryce Washington | | | | | | | | | | | 8 | 5 | | | | | | 14 |
| = | (Australia) Mark Ceveri | 8 | 10 | 14 | 14 | 10 | Ret | 17 | 8 | 16 | 14 | 9 | 13 | 19 | Ret | 10 | 10 | | 14 |
| 17 | (Australia) Mark Douglas | | | | | | | 10 | 5 | | | | | | | | | | 11 |
| 18 | (Australia) Tim Macrow | | | 16 | 15 | | | | | | | | | 7 | 8 | | | | 10 |
| 19 | (Australia) Ian Dyk | | | | | | | | | 7 | 9 | | | | | | | | 8 |
| 20 | (Australia) Kurt Wimmer | 11 | DNS | 9 | 8 | 12 | 10 | | | Ret | 13 | | | 13 | Ret | | | | 7 |
| = | (Australia) James Small | | | 12 | 10 | 14 | Ret | Ret | 7 | Ret | Ret | | | 11 | Ret | | | | 7 |
| 22 | (Australia) Laurence Burford | 15 | 11 | | | | | | | 10 | 10 | | | | | | | | 2 |
| = | (Australia) Tony D'Alberto | | | | | | | | | | | | | 10 | 10 | | | | 2 |
| 24 | (Australia) Tim Wheeler | | | | | | | 14 | 10 | | | | | | | | | | 1 |
| - | (Australia) John Pettit | 12 | 13 | Ret | 20 | | | | | 13 | Ret | | | | | | | | 0 |
| - | (Australia) Ben Eggleston | 14 | 16 | 15 | 19 | 17 | 15 | | | | | | | 17 | 16 | | | | 0 |
| - | (Australia) Nick Torelli | 16 | 15 | Ret | DNS | 15 | 13 | | | | | | | | | | | | 0 |
| - | (Australia) Veijo Phillips | 17 | 14 | Ret | 18 | 16 | 12 | | | | | Ret | DNS | 16 | Ret | | | | 0 |
| - | (Australia) Stephen Austin | 18 | 18 | | | | | | | | | | | | | | | | 0 |
| - | (Australia) Blake Smith | 19 | 20 | Ret | DNS | | | | | | | | | | | | | | 0 |
| - | (Australia) Tony LeMessurier | 20 | 17 | 18 | DNS | 19 | Ret | | | 19 | 16 | Ret | Ret | 25 | 20 | 17 | 18 | | 0 |
| - | (Australia) Daniel Pappas | 21 | 13 | 20 | Ret | 18 | Ret | | | 20 | Ret | 11 | 14 | 18 | 18 | Ret | 17 | | 0 |
| - | (Australia) John Houlder | 23 | 19 | 17 | 21 | 13 | 14 | | | 18 | 17 | | | 21 | 19 | Ret | 14 | | 0 |
| - | (Australia) Matthew Tate | DNS | Ret | 13 | 17 | | | | | | | | | | | | | | 0 |
| - | (Australia) Kevin Miller | | | 19 | 22 | | | | | | | | | | | Ret | DNS | | 0 |
| - | (Australia) Adam Hickey | | | Ret | Ret | | | | | | | | | 24 | 14 | | | | 0 |
| - | (Australia) Mark McNally | | | | | | | 12 | Ret | | | 12 | Ret | 20 | Ret | | | | 0 |
| - | (Australia) Matt Cherry | | | | | | | 13 | Ret | | | | | | | | | | 0 |
| - | (Australia) Steve Baxter | | | | | | | 15 | Ret | | | | | | | | | | 0 |
| - | (Australia) Clive Hartz | | | | | | | 18 | 13 | | | | | | | | | | 0 |
| - | (Australia) John McCowan | | | | | | | 19 | Ret | | | 13 | 15 | | | | | | 0 |
| - | (Australia) Tim Davies | | | | | | | 20 | 12 | | | | | | | | | | 0 |
| - | (Australia) Michael Henderson | | | | | | | 21 | 11 | | | | | | | | | | 0 |
| - | (Australia) Luke Morton | | | | | | | 22 | 14 | | | | | | | | | | 0 |
| - | (Australia) Aaron Caratti | | | | | | | Ret | DNS | | | | | | | | | | 0 |
| - | (Australia) Steven Hooton | | | | | | | Ret | Ret | | | | | | | | | | 0 |
| - | (Australia) Damien Meyer | | | | | | | | | 14 | 19 | | | | | | | | 0 |
| - | (Australia) Grant Ashby | | | | | | | | | 15 | 15 | | | 23 | 17 | 15 | 15 | | 0 |
| - | (Australia) Ty Hanger | | | | | | | | | Ret | Ret | | | | | | | | 0 |
| - | (Australia) Graham Knuckey | | | | | | | | | | | 14 | Ret | | | | | | 0 |
| - | (Australia) Matt Wall | | | | | | | | | | | | | 22 | 13 | | | | 0 |
| - | (Australia) David Reynolds | | | | | | | | | | | | | Ret | 14 | | | | 0 |
| - | (Australia) Kent Quinn | | | | | | | | | | | | | | | 14 | 12 | | 0 |
| - | (Australia) Chris Gilmour | | | | | | | | | | | | | | | 12 | 11 | | 0 |
| - | (Australia) Mark Holt | | | | | | | | | | | | | | | 13 | 13 | | 0 |
| - | (Australia) Neil Pollard | | | | | | | | | | | | | | | 16 | 16 | | 0 |
| - | (Australia) Klark Quinn | | | | | | | | | | | | | | | Ret | DNS | | 0 |
| Pos. | Driver | (New South Wales) Wak. | | (Victoria (state)) Phi. | | (Australian Capital Territory) Can. | | (Western Australia) Wan. | | (New South Wales) Ora. | | (South Australia) Mal. | | (Victoria (state)) Win. | | (Queensland) Que. | | Pen | Pts |
| Pos. | Driver | R1 | R2 | R1 | R2 | R1 | R2 | R1 | R2 | R1 | R2 | R1 | R2 | R1 | R2 | R1 | R2 | Pen | Pts |

Note: Australian Formula Ford regulations mandated the use of the Ford 1600cc "Kent" four cylinder engine.
