= David Reynolds (racing driver) =

Australian professional racing driver (born 1985)

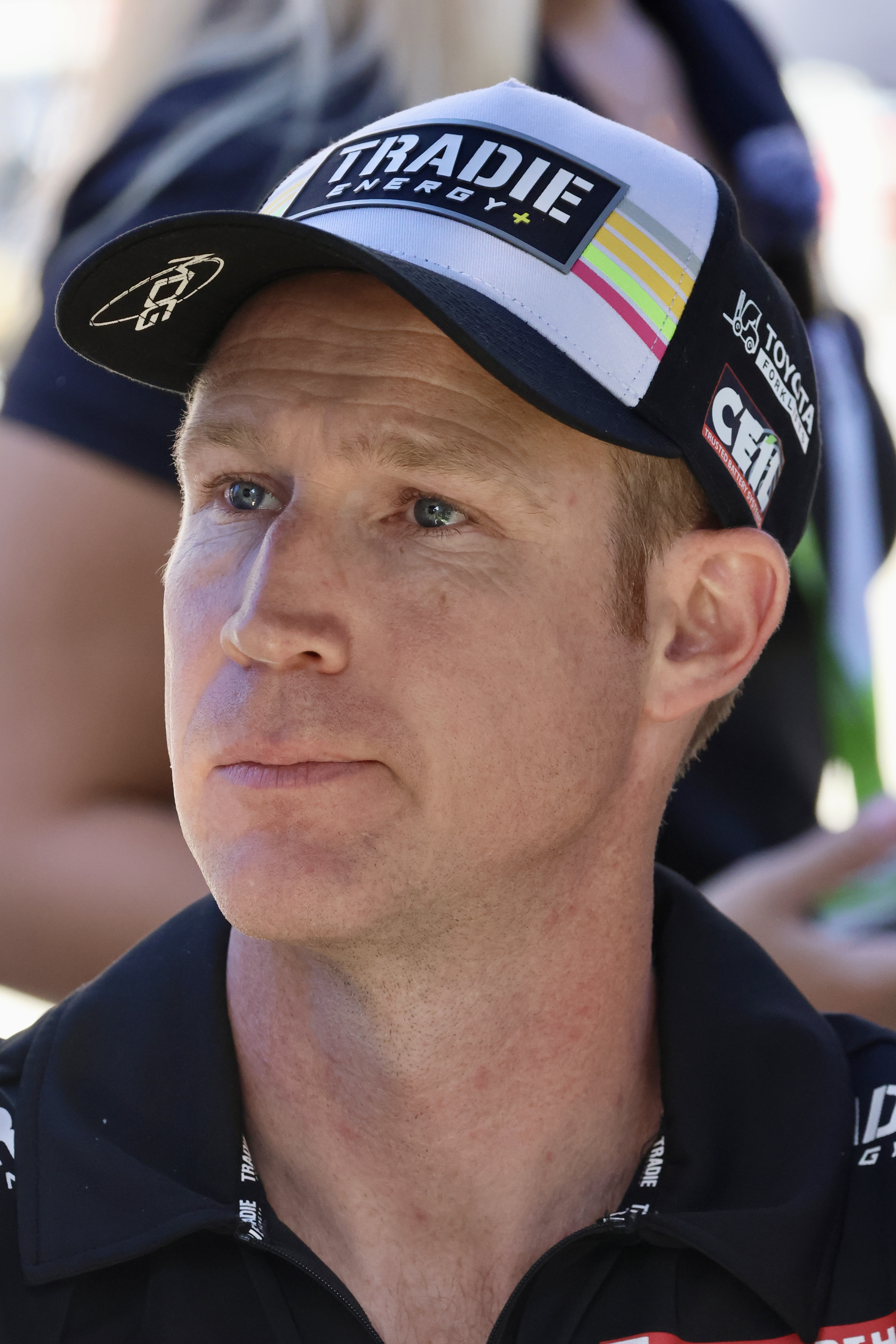
- Reynolds in 2025
- Nationality: Australian
- Born: David Allen Reynolds; 3 July 1985 (age 41) Albury, New South Wales
- Categorisation: FIA Gold

Supercars Championship career
- Current team: Team 18
- Championships: 0
- Races: 515
- Wins: 8
- Podiums: 48
- Pole positions: 17
- 2015 position: 3rd (2910 pts)

David Allen Reynolds (born 3 July 1985) is an Australian professional racing driver. He currently drives in the Repco Supercars Championship for Team 18, racing the No. 20 Chevrolet Camaro ZL1. He won the 2017 Bathurst 1000 with co-driver Luke Youlden.

== Early career ==
Reynolds stepped into a national series campaign in the 2003 Australian Formula Ford Championship, finishing outside the top ten at series end. For 2004 Reynolds joined the Sonic Motor Racing Services for what would be four years and bring two national championships. First came victory in the 2004 Australian Formula Ford Championship. Moving away from open wheelers, Reynolds became part of Team Sonic expansion into Carrera Cup Australia. Finishing fifth in his first season, Reynolds stepped into third as the series transitioned from the Porsche 996 to the Porsche 997 in the 2006 season. After a season-long battle with Alex Davison and Craig Baird, Reynolds claimed the 2007 title,

== Supercars Championship ==
=== Endurance co-driver (2007–2008) ===
While Reynolds' initially to drive one of the HSV Dealer Team Holdens for the 2007 Endurance season, until, he moved into a co-driver role with Cameron McConville at Paul Weel Racing after not wanting to potentially impact the championship chnaces of regular drivers Rick Kelly and Garth Tander. Unfortunately, the pairing failed to finish the Sandown 500, and Reynolds failed to turn a lap in the Bathurst after the car's engine failed on the warm-up lap.

With Team Sonic not yet ready to step into the Fujitsu V8 Supercar Seriesfor 2008, Reynolds joined 2007 Fujitsu Series Champions Tony D'Alberto Racing, finishing his first season in the category fourth in the standings. Paired with Paul Dumbrell, they failed to finish the Phillip Island 500. This preceded a Bathurst 1000 on the sidelines after Reynolds gave up his seat in Dumbrell's car for Rick Kelly, after Kelly's car was unable to be repaired for the race from Radisich's career-ending crash in practice.

=== Walkinshaw Racing (2009) ===
In 2009, Reynolds drove for Walkinshaw Racing in the #24 Bundaberg Red Racing Holden VE Commodore, partnering Paul Dumbrell in the Autobarn Commodore as part of a new four-car squad. He displayed promise throughout the season, but was generally struck with bad luck. A standout performance for the year occurred at Barbagallo Raceway, where Reynolds ran in the top three cars for most of the race. The likely podium result came unstuck when a delaminated front left tyre put him in the sand trap at turn 6, and he eventually finished in 22nd place. In the final standings, Reynolds placed in 22nd for the year, without a contract for the 2010 season.

=== Endurance return (2010) ===
For 2010, Reynolds was retained by Walkinshaw Racing for the endurance events, joining Will Davison in the #22 HRT Holden VE Commodore at Phillip Island and Bathurst. The pairing had a strong showing at the Bathurst 1000, with the car being in the top five cars for most of the day. However, while running in third with only a handful of laps remaining, Davison had a race-ending crash at the top of the mountain. For the Gold Coast 600, Reynolds joined Fabian Coulthard in the #24 Bundaberg Red Racing Holden, in order for the four-car Walkinshaw team to abide by the international co-driver regulations at the time.

=== Kelly Racing (2011) ===
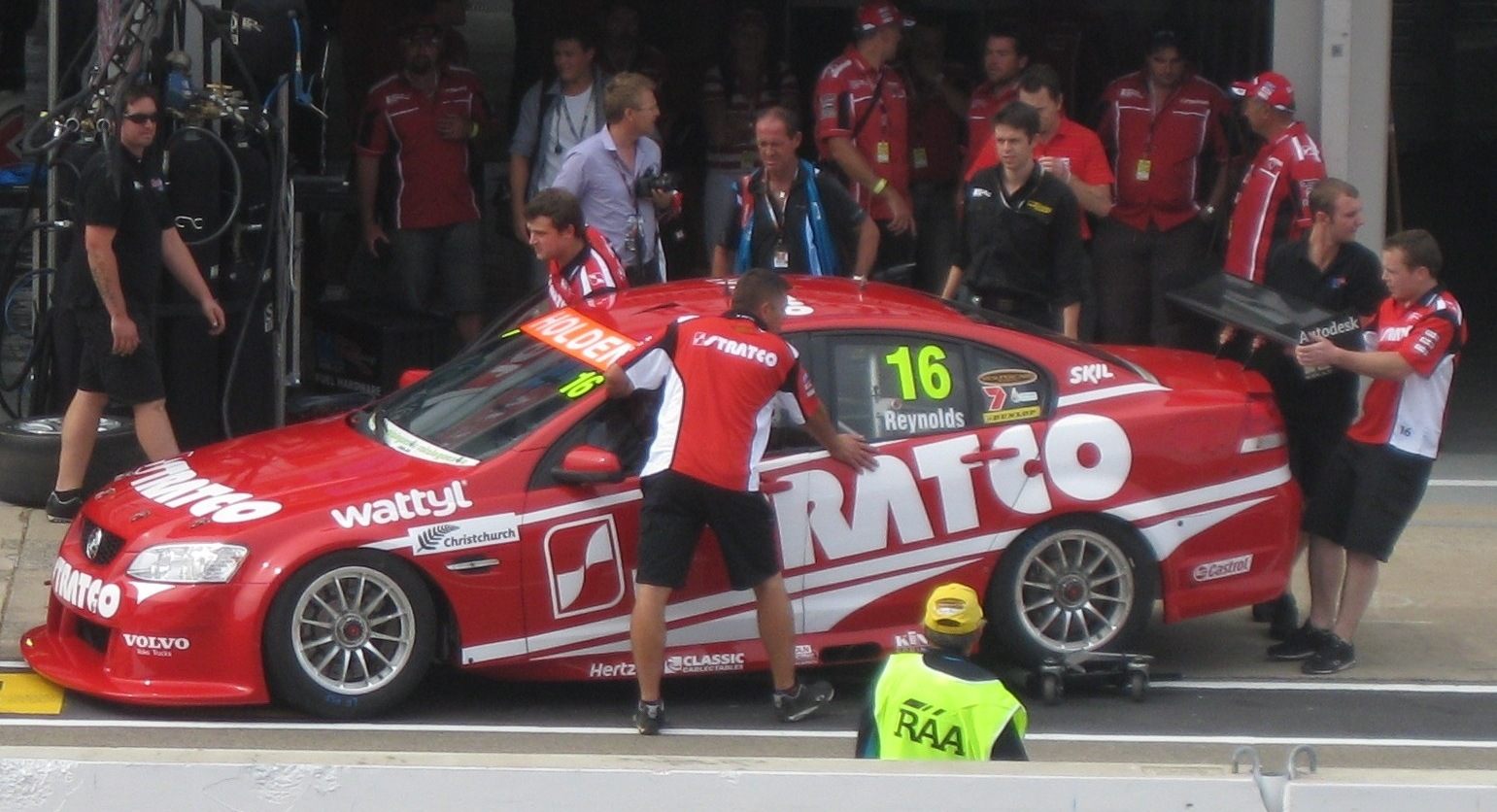
The Holden VE Commodore of David Reynolds at the 2011 Clipsal 500 Adelaide

For the 2011 season, Reynolds joined Kelly Racing to drive the #16 Stratco Holden VE Commodore, with Greg Murphy as his teammate. Despite racing in the oldest car in the field at the time, he achieved a credible 19th placing in the championship. The season was highlighted by a couple top-five finishes as well as multiple shootout appearances, including at Bathurst. From midway through the 2011 season, tensions began showing between the team and Reynolds and his engineer James Small. This came to a head when at Phillip Island, remarks over team radio from Small aimed towards Rick Kelly caused Small to be let go from the team. Reynolds stated that he was unsure if he would race at Bathurst that year, much less the rest of the season. Reynolds would go on to finish the season with Kelly Racing, but was released from his contract after only one year of his two-year deal at the team to pursue other opportunities.

=== Rod Nash Racing (2012–2015) ===
==== 2012 ====
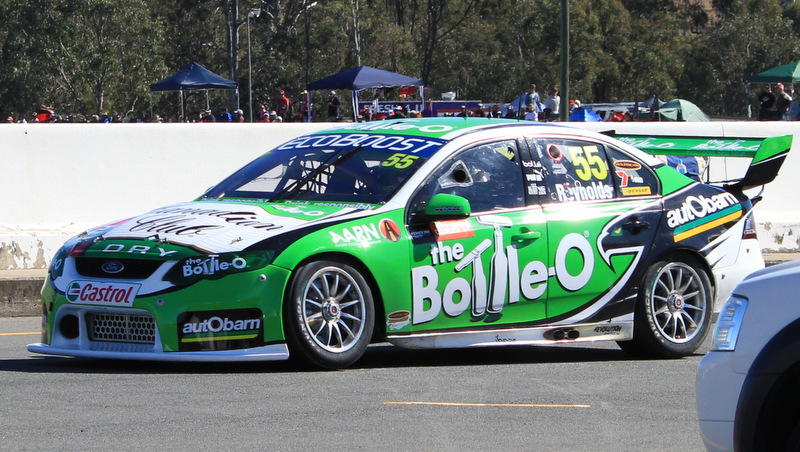
Reynolds at the 2012 Ipswich 300

After widely reported rumours of the move, for the 2012 season Reynolds switched teams and manufacturers to join Rod Nash Racing to drive the #55 Bottle-O Ford FG Falcon prepared by Ford Performance Racing. He was rejoined by James Small, his engineer from the previous season. Reynolds' 2012 season was a notable step up from years past, with consistent top ten qualifying positions and race results recorded throughout the year. Despite consistently performing at his new team, accidents, mechanical failures, and bad luck marred the season, with multiple promising race results being compromised. Reynolds scored his first pole position at Townsville after numerous front-row starts, eventually finishing sixth. Reynolds paired with Dean Canto for the year's endurance races, and started from the front row start at the Sandown 500, eventually finishing in 6th place. For the 2012 Bathurst 1000, the 50th running of the event, the Rod Nash Racing car paid homage to the 1967 Bathurst winning car of Fred Gibson and Harry Firth, with a livery closely resembling the winning car, a 1967 Ford Falcon GT. The team also changed the car number to 52 for the race. Reynolds participated in the shootout and qualified the car 8th, and had a hard-fought battle with eventual victor Jamie Whincup in the dying stages. He eventually crossing the line second, only 0.786 seconds behind Whincup, the record for shortest winning margin at the time. In his characteristic funny-man style, while the winning drivers Whincup and Dumbrell threw their racing boots off the podium into the crowd, Reynolds threw the microphone of then broadcaster of Channel 7 into the sea of fans below. Reynolds 2012 championship position was ninth place.

==== 2013 ====
For 2013, Reynolds continued in the #55, however, engineer James Small was switched to the #5 Pepsi Max car of Mark Winterbottom, with Nathaniel Osborne joining Reynolds. Reynolds' season started poorly, placing no higher than 14th in the first two rounds as well as a crash in Tasmania. Results improved as the season progressed, with Reynolds consistently recording top-ten qualifying and race results. At Hidden Valley, Reynolds scored two pole positions and had strong car pace. He finished on the podium in the final race of the event. For the endurance races, Reynolds was again joined by Dean Canto. For the 2013 Bathurst 1000, Reynolds qualified the car in ninth, and for most of the race the car was in the top-ten. In the final laps of the race, Reynolds had just passed Bright for 5th position when he was told that the car didn't have enough fuel to make it to the end. A pit stop two laps from the finish relegated him to ninth place. The regulations for co-drivers at the Gold Coast 600 were changed in 2013, with Reynolds retaining Canto for the event. Reynolds qualified on pole for the second race of the weekend, his first pole position in a shootout. After a strong race, Reynolds was in second place behind James Courtney in the #22 Toll HRT Holden VF Commodore with 20 laps to go. After a front suspension failure for #22 car, Reynolds inherited the lead of the race which maintained until the chequered flag to take his maiden V8 Supercars victory. In his characteristic irreverent style, he threw pot plants off the podium to his team, and as the podium presentation was being undertaken hit the Armor-All Man with his own foam hammer, as well as co-driver Canto. In the final two events of the season, Reynolds experienced incredibly good luck. In the first race at Phillip Island, he was hit by an out-of-control Alex Premat at turn 4, but was only spun, suffering minimal damage at the rear of his car, while the car of James Courtney one place behind him took the full impact of Premat's car. Courtney was unable to race for the rest of the season as a result of his injuries. The luck continued as early in the first race of the season's final event in Sydney, Reynolds' car was vaulted up on two wheels after a bottleneck of cars on the tight circuit, caused by Mark Winterbottom spinning Craig Lowndes at turn 10. This amazingly resulted in no damage to the suspension or steering, but Reynolds continued on and finished 11th. In the final race of the season, Reynolds qualified in an uncharacteristic 17th place. However, through clever pit strategy and staying out of trouble at the treacherous circuit, Reynolds brought the car home in fourth position. Reynolds eventually finished the season in ninth place.

==== 2014 ====
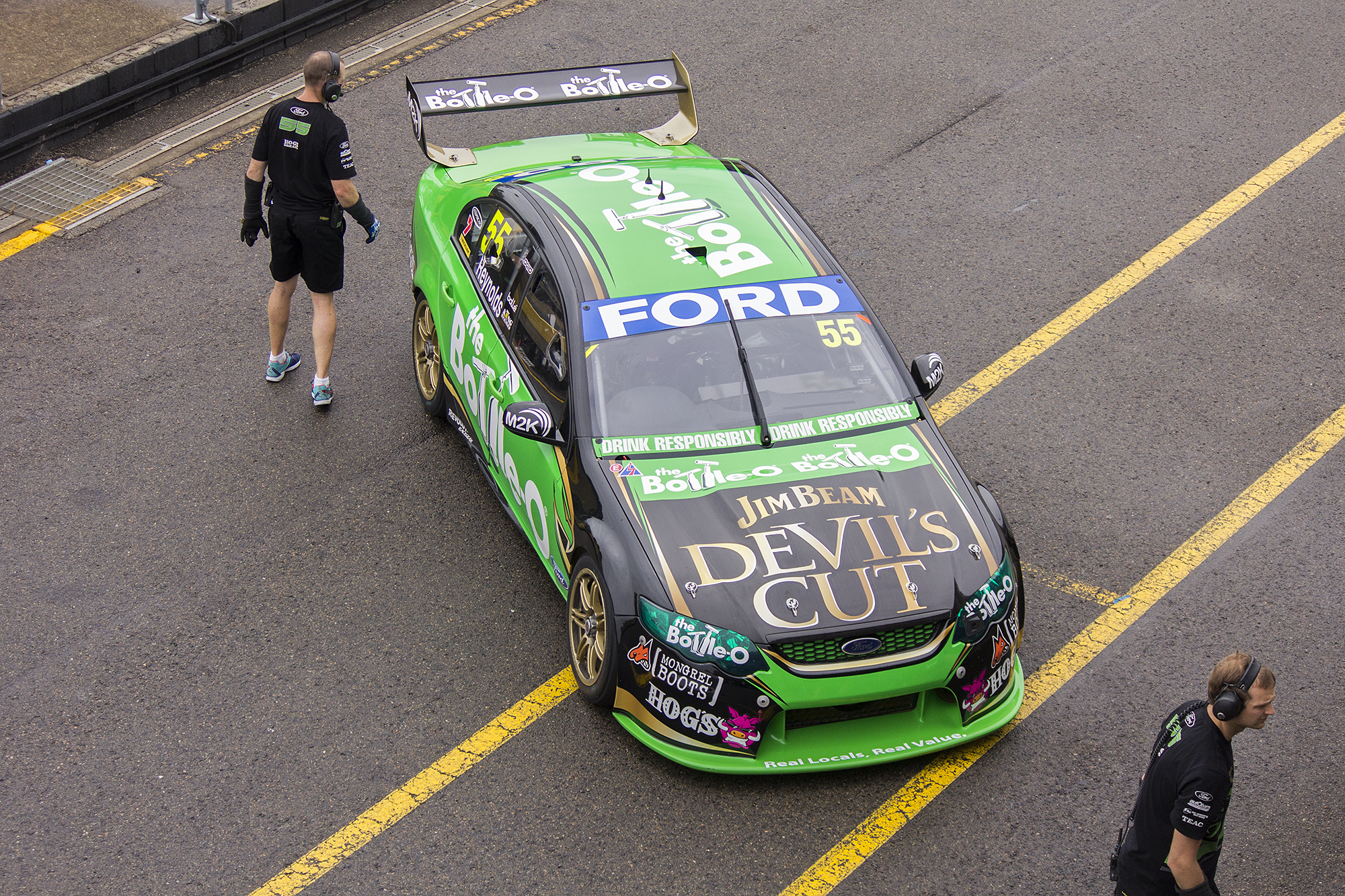
Reynolds in the pitlane during the V8 Supercars Test Day at the Sydney Motorsport Park.

For the 2014 season, Reynolds had his third season in the #55 Rod Nash Racing Bottle-O Ford. Reynolds season again started with mixed results, following a trend of poor results in the two short 'sprint' races on the Saturday, but top-ten results in the longer races on Sunday. Results improved after the Tasmanian event, where consistently finished inside the top 15 cars, but suffered numerous retirements throughout the season. For the endurance races, Reynolds was again joined by Dean Canto. At the Sandown 500, the pairing recorded a 9th-place finish. The car was likely going to finish on the podium before Reynolds was given a drive-through penalty for a pit stop infringement. The 2014 Bathurst 1000 looked promising from the outset for Reynolds and Canto, as the #55 was in the top-three in all practice sessions, breaking the lap record in the final Thursday practice. Unfortunately, in the qualifying session Reynolds had a large crash at the top of the mountain, a result of going slightly wide of the racing line when going around the outside of a slower car. An exclusion from the session for teammate Chaz Mostert, as well as the #2 HRT Commodore not taking part in the race from damage meant that Reynolds and Canto started the race from 24th position. Consistent safety cars during the race and car pace that was equal to the lead group left them well inside the top-ten by the middle of the race. At the red flag period on lap 61 for track repair, the #55 was in second position. The car continued in the top three cars until its retirement on lap 118, where during a safety car period and running in second place, an alternator failure forced the car to retire. Continuing the run of poor luck, at the final endurance event at Surfers Paradise, when running in the top five cars, Reynolds clipped a tyre bundle in the Beach Chicane. He drove on for two more corners before the right front suspension failed and Reynolds crashed the car heavily into a concrete wall. The car was repaired in time for the race the next day where he and Canto finished a respectable sixth. At the final round in Sydney, Reynolds recorded his first podium finish of the season with a third placing in the first race. Reynolds eventually finished the season in 15th position.

==== 2015 ====
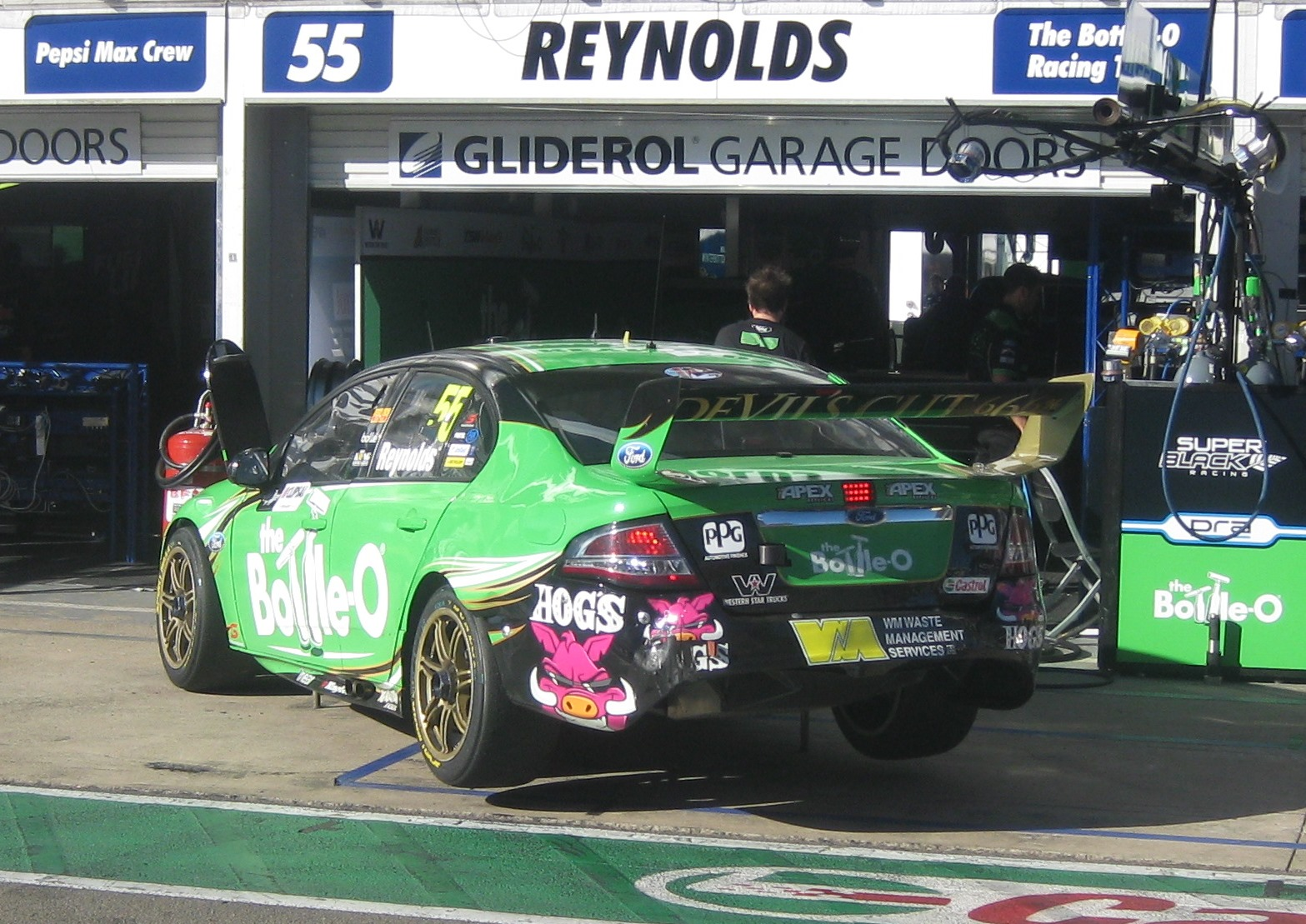
The Ford Falcon (FG) of David Reynolds at the 2015 Clipsal 500 Adelaide

For the 2015 season, Reynolds had his final year in the #55 Rod Nash Racing Bottle-O Ford Falcon, and his most successful season to date. During the offseason, Ford Performance Racing were renamed Prodrive Racing Australia after Ford Australia chose to not renew their factory support for the team. Despite this, the team introduced the new FGX Falcon that would initially be driven by Pepsi Max drivers Mark Winterbottom and Chaz Mostert, while the other two cars of Reynolds and Andre Heimgartner would be upgraded later in the season. Brad Wischusen was placed into the lead engineering role for the #55, with Nathaniel Osborne moving into a different position within the team. Reynolds recorded poor results in the first round in Adelaide while still running the older model FG Falcon, the one likely top ten result being undone by being spun by Michael Caruso at turn 9. At the next round in Tasmania, Reynolds received the updated FGX Falcon, and the new car brought with it an instant improvement in results. He qualified in the top-five for all three races, and finished the two Saturday races in sixth and fourth respectively. For the Sunday race, Reynolds started on the front row alongside Craig Lowndes. Reynolds made the better start of the two cars, but Lowndes spun the #55 at the second corner, with Reynolds eventually finishing 11th. From this point forward in the season, Reynolds consistently recorded top ten qualifying and race positions. For the Sunday race at Hidden Valley, Reynolds qualified on pole. Reynolds took his second career victory and first solo victory in V8 Supercars racing after capitalising on a mistake from early leader Fabian Coulthard, and avoiding a penalty from running straight ahead at turn 5 while avoiding a lapped car. After the podium presentation, Reynolds performed a 'shoey' on the podium, drinking champagne from his race boot, a move subsequently made world famous by Australian Formula 1 driver Daniel Ricciardo. Reynolds continued the good qualifying and race results throughout the rest of the season, finishing outside the top-ten cars on only one occasion until the end of the season, highlighted by dual podium finishes in Townsville, taking pole position at Bathurst, a podium finish on the Gold Coast, a podium finish and a race win at Pukekohe, and a podium finish at the final event in Sydney. The only non-top ten finish was as a result of Shane van Gisbergen in the first race at Phillip Island, in which he spun Reynolds at the fast Hayshed turn while only a few inches up the side of the #55. The car escaped damage from its high-speed spin, but the incident resulted in a 25th-place finish. Reynolds final championship position for the season was an excellent third place. Despite the competitive results and high championship placing, Reynolds was not retained by Prodrive Racing Australia for the 2016 season, and announced in November 2015 that he would leave the team to drive for Erebus Motorsport for the 2016 season.

=== Erebus Motorsport (2016–2020) ===
==== 2016 ====
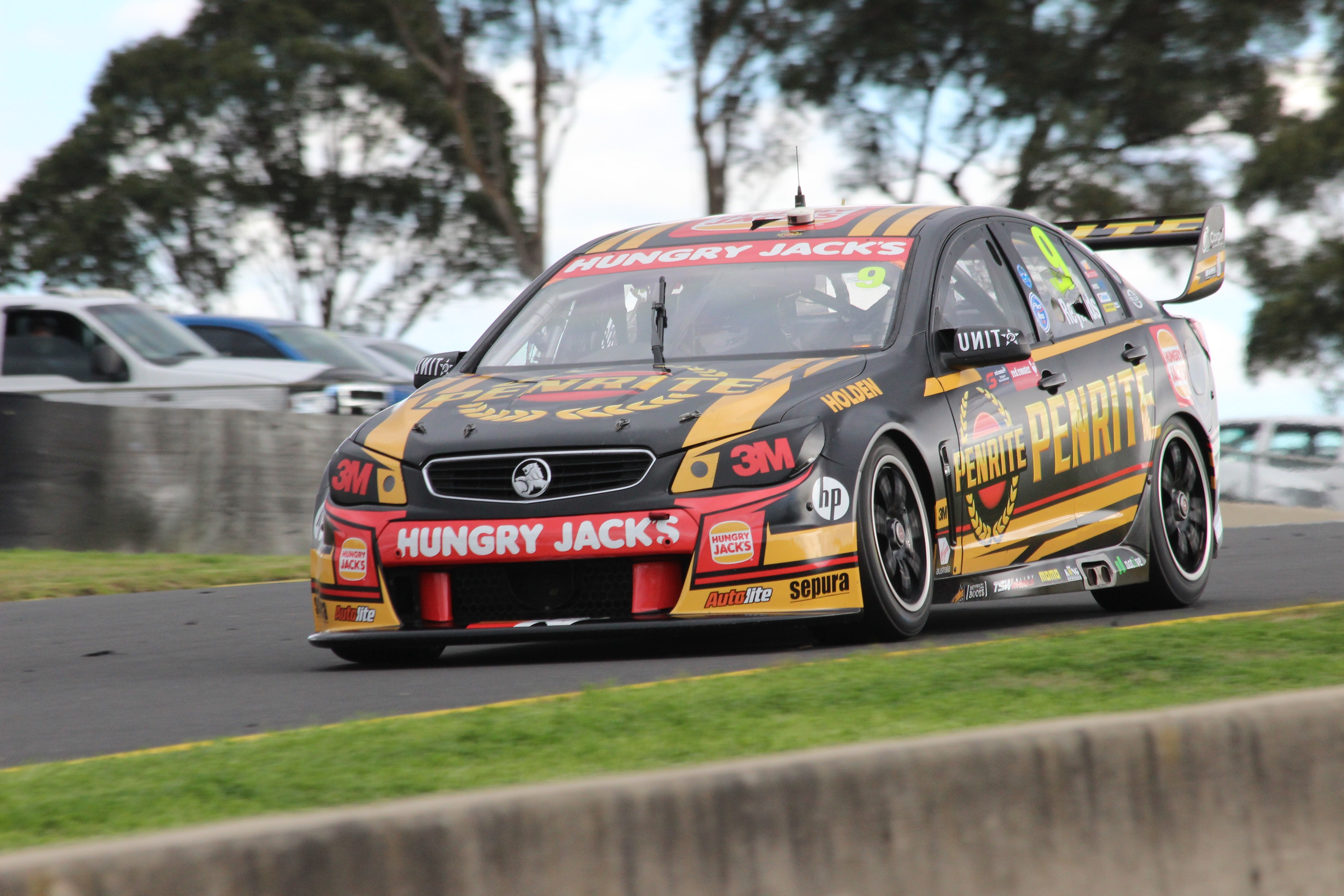
Reynolds at the 2016 Sydney SuperSprint

For the 2016 season, Reynolds was signed to drive the #9 Erebus Motorsport Holden VF Commodore with title sponsorship from Penrite. In the 2015–16 offseason, Erebus Motorsport went through a significant overhaul. The team elected to cease their Mercedes E63 AMG program, and instead purchased two older model Walkinshaw Racing Holden Commodores that they would prepare with their own in-house designed and fabricated componentry. The team also relocated from Queensland to Melbourne, Victoria, and had to build up a near entirely new group of staff, including new mechanics and engineers. As a result, the team, and Reynolds, struggled at the beginning of the season. The team were inexperienced, and the dated Walkinshaw Racing Holdens were not up to the technical specifications of the front-running cars. The early part of the season was highlighted by a top-five finish in the wet Sunday race at Adelaide, where through good car pace, careful driving in the treacherous conditions, and a clever strategy from the team with a time-certain race finish and required fuel drop, propelled the #9 car to the front of the field. Despite the development of the team and the car, Reynolds mostly ran around the middle to the back of the field for the duration of the season. Highlights included an admirable sixth-place finish in the Sunday race at Winton from a lowly 17th place qualifying position, through nothing other than a fast car (shown by Reynolds recording the fastest lap of the race), as well as recording the fastest race lap time at Bathurst, and shootout appearances in Townsville, the Gold Coast and Sydney. Good race results at Townsville and the Gold Coast were street circuits were undone by either incorrect strategy calls or the #9 being involved in incidents during the races. For the endurance races, Reynolds was partnered with Craig Baird, although the pairing failed to garner notable results. From Bathurst onwards, former Walkinshaw Racing engineer Alistair McVean joined the team as lead engineer on the #9 car. The best event result for Reynolds came at the season's final event in Sydney, also being the final event held at the circuit. Reynolds qualified in seventh position for the Saturday race, but was excluded from qualifying because of a regulatory violation in parc fermé after the session. Despite starting in last place, he brought the #9 Penrite car home in tenth place. The highlight of the entire season for the team came in the last race of the season the next day, with Reynolds making the shootout and qualifying in 4th. Reynolds made his way up to third place during the race, and endured a long battle with Jamie Whincup in the closing stages for the final podium spot. He crossed the line in third for Reynolds' and Erebus Motorsport's first podium of the season. Reynolds finished the season in 16th place in the championship.

==== 2017 ====
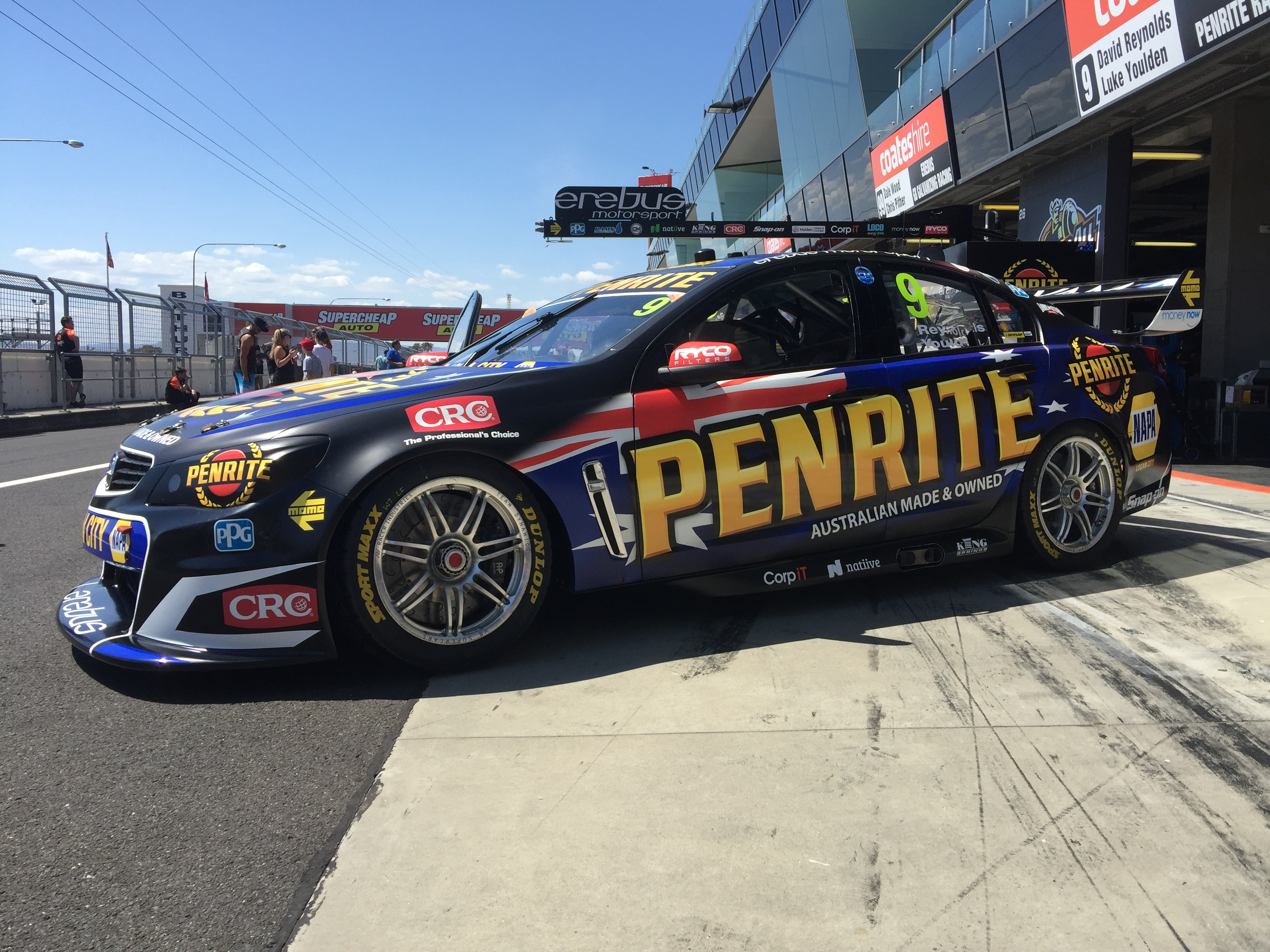
Reynolds won the 2017 Bathurst 1000 for Erebus Motorsport, driving alongside Luke Youlden.

For 2017, Reynolds remained at Erebus Motorsport, with the car retaining the backing of Penrite for the #9 Commodore. In the 2016–17 off-season, the team embarked on building a new car for Reynolds from the ground up, built to Reynolds' and Erebus Motorsport's specifications, as opposed to the Walkinshaw Racing car that they were working with previously. However, the team elected to continue using the well-rounded Walkinshaw Racing engine package. Reynolds endured a lacklustre opening round in Adelaide. Despite featuring in the shootout for the Saturday race, he didn't have a car to challenge for the top positions, and this was compounded with receiving a drive-through penalty for exceeding track limits too many times, resulting in an 18th-place finish. Another finish outside of the top ten followed on Sunday. However, from Tasmania onwards, results improved, with Reynolds and Erebus Motorsport consistently being in and around the top ten cars in qualifying and races. The combination of Reynolds, engineer Alistair McVean, and a brand new car with quality componentry developed by Erebus entailed strong results in nearly every session that the team participated in, albeit with the car regularly struggling with pace over longer stints in races. Highlights included a podium finish at Phillip Island, another stirring drive at Winton with a 4th-place result after a 14th place qualifying position, as well as top five qualifying positions at Hidden Valley and Townsville. For the endurance races, Reynolds was partnered with Luke Youlden. At the first endurance event at Sandown, stated as being a retro round, the #9 Penrite Holden ran a tribute livery to the Holden Torana L34 ran in 1976 by Peter Brock and Phil Brock. The event started well for Reynolds and Youlden, with Youlden winning the first co-driver qualifying race, and Reynolds finishing the second qualifying race in third. After starting from third, the car suffered from a tyre delamination mid-way through the race and eventually finished in 17th. At the 2017 Bathurst 1000, the #9 car was consistently among the top few cars in the free practice sessions, and Reynolds qualified the car in second for the shootout. In the shootout, Reynolds consolidated the speed shown from the car and recorded a lap time quick enough for second place on the grid. Despite the weekend having been run in dry conditions up to that point, nearly the entirety of the race was run in wet conditions. Reynolds and Youlden kept themselves in contention for victory throughout the day, making minimal mistakes and keeping themselves within the top three cars for the duration of the race. Late race safety cars and fuel strategy complicated the complexion of the race in the dying stages. At a late-race restart, Reynolds was positioned just inside the top ten, fuel strategy having taken the #9 out of the top few cars. Another restart soon after with subsequent strategy plays from other teams left Reynolds in fourth position, but a light sprinkling of rain on the pit straight caused the two leading cars of Shane van Gisbergen and Garth Tander to run off at the final corner, leaving Reynolds in second position behind Nick Percat. Reynolds had superior car speed over Percat, and quickly passed him, but had to conserve fuel in order to make it to the end. Subsequent safety car periods eased the need to conserve fuel, and Reynolds was able to guide the #9 Erebus Penrite Commodore to victory on a treacherous drying track, setting the fastest lap time of the day in the final laps of the race. It was the maiden Bathurst victory for Reynolds, Youlden, and Erebus Motorsport, and the first independent Australian team to win the Bathurst 1000 since Garth Tander and Jason Bargwanna won the 2000 Bathurst 1000 for Garry Rogers Motorsport in similar conditions. The remaining endurance event at the Gold Coast didn't yield similar results, with damage on the car hindering the driver change and subsequent race result in the first race, and a mistake and resulting crash by Youlden taking the pairing out of a top-ten position in the Sunday race. Reynolds ended the year with a third-place finishing in the Sunday race of the inaugural Newcastle 500, finishing seventh in the championship.

==== 2018 ====
Continuing with Erebus Motorsport in the Penrite #9, the team and category welcomed in the new ZB Holden Commodore to replace the aging VF model. The team elected to build another new car for Reynolds, with new teammate Anton De Pasquale inheriting Reynolds' 2017 car. The new Holden instantly proved to be competitive, with Reynolds claiming multiple top five placings in the first few rounds of the season, including podium placings at Adelaide, Phillip Island, Barbagallo, and Hidden Valley, with race wins at Albert Park and Hidden Valley, with the latter coming after an incredible pass around the outside from fourth place at the first turn on the first lap of the race. Reynolds consistently placed in the top-ten for the majority of races during the year, occasionally finishing down the order from poor tyre life, incidents, or failures during qualifying or the race. Reynolds was again joined by Luke Youlden for the endurance races, and the competitiveness of the car stepped up for these events. Youlden and Reynolds took pole position for the Sandown 500, finishing in fifth, and for the Bathurst 1000, with teammate De Pasquale qualifying in third. The 2018 Bathurst 1000 was largely dominated by the #9 Penrite car of Reynolds and Youlden, with there seemingly being no challenger to the pace of the car for the best part of the race. The race was uncharacteristically devoid of safety cars and drama, with it being very much a lights-to-flag sprint for the duration. Despite the formidable car performance and Reynolds' ability at the circuit, he would succumb to fatigue in the late stages of the race, conceding the lead to the #888 of Lowndes and Steven Richards. Reynolds would later pit and let Youlden bring the car home, with Reynolds giving an emotional interview to pit reporter and multiple Bathurst winner Greg Murphy after getting out of the car. The car would eventually finish in 13th place, having also recorded the fastest lap of the race for three years in succession. The #9 car wouldn't finish outside of the top-five cars for the rest of the season, claiming another shootout pole position at Surfers Paradise, and a second placing and a victory from pole position at the final event in Newcastle. Reynolds would finish the season in fifth place in the championship.

==== 2019 ====
Entering his fourth season with Erebus in the #9 Penrite car, Reynolds was touted as the potential 2019 championship winner by multiple-times champion and Bathurst winner Craig Lowndes. As an additional coup for Erebus Motorsport and their continued form in the Supercars Championship, Penrite extended their sponsorship over the two cars in the team, after holding the naming rights to Anton De Pasquale's car for the final few events of the 2018 season. Reynolds' season started out slower than the year previous, recording top ten results in all seven opening races before scoring a place on the podium with third place on Sunday in Tasmania.

The consistent results would continue with top ten placings in all races aside from an 11th place on the Sunday at Phillip Island. The hopes of Reynolds, or any other driver in fact, at fighting for the 2019 Championship were dashed at the dominating fashion in which Scott McLaughlin and DJR Team Penske started the 2019 season, with McLaughlin winning nearly every race. At Winton, the form of the Erebus Commodores strengthened, with Reynolds and teammate De Pasquale often being some of the best placed Holdens in the field in qualifying and races, the cars consistently fighting with and beating powerhouse factory-backed team Triple Eight Race Engineering. Reynolds position in the top three cars in the championship standings was solidified by two podium placings in Hidden Valley, beaten only by Ford Mustangs.

==== 2020 ====
Reynolds began 2020 strongly with, topping first practice before qualifying second despite front suspension damage for the opening race at the Adelaide 500. Challenging eventual race winner Jamie Whincup, Reynolds came home fourth, with an engine issue in the #9 Penrite Erebus Commodore forcing him to start 14th for Race 2. A collision with Erebus teammate Anton DePasquale saw both cars fail to finish in what was to be the final race prior to COVID impacting the running of the 2020 Virgin Australia Supercars Championship.

As teams moved to the second round at the Australian Formula One Grand Prix, the Friday morning (March 13) official cancellation of the event saw the series on hiatus until late June.

The return event was a reformatted Sydney SuperNight, with Reynolds posting a best finish of fourth place, which the Erebus driver again repeated the next weekend at the back-to-back Sydney Motorsport Park event. Back-to-back double rounds were held at Darwin, Townsville and The Bend Motorsport Park in South Australia, with a best finish of fifth (Darwin 1 and Townsville 1).

The opening race of the second Townsville round saw controversy with Reynolds and championship leader, Scott McLaughlin from Shell V-Power Racing, coming together at the first corner.

Bathurst saw Reynolds co-drive with Will Brown, with Reynolds qualifying the car in 12th with a 2:04.6730. The pair came home 15th, surviving the rain and suffering with a dropped cylinder in the latter part of the race.

Off track, Reynolds was embroiled in controversy as speculation that he wanted to end his ten-year deal with Erebus, signed in 2019. In December 2020, it was confirmed that Reynolds would depart Erebus Racing to join Kelly Racing for 2021, with Penrite Oil backing as Kelly Racing switched from Nissan Altimas to the Ford Mustang.

Reynolds finished the 2020 season 12th in the championship on 1492 points.

=== Kelly Grove Racing/Grove Racing (2021–2023) ===
Reynolds returned to Kelly Racing, now part-owned by Grove Racing, in 2021, bringing sponsor Penrite with him from Erebus. Both stayed on when Grove completed a takeover of the team ahead of the 2022 season.

=== Charlie Schwerkolt Racing (2024–present) ===
Reynolds was announced as replacing Scott Pye at Team 18 for the 2024 Supercars Championship.

== Controversies ==
At the 2015 Bathurst 1000, Reynolds was fined AU$25,000 for making sexist comments regarding an all-female one-off entry for Simona de Silvestro and Renee Gracie – labelling it the "pussywagon", a reference to the movie Kill Bill.

In 2021, during the COVID-19 pandemic, Reynolds was required to sit out two rounds of the Supercars season having failed to meet NSW Health-mandated vaccination requirements. Reynolds had claimed an exemption prior to the first of four consecutive rounds at Sydney Motorsport Park, which was overturned following said round.

== Business career ==
In 2021, Reynolds partnered with fellow Supercars driver Will Brown to create the Cartopia platform, with the goal to create a better car sales experience for both dealers and consumers. Launching in January 2021, Cartopia offers online vehicle search and purchasing via its website.

Reynolds is also behind road safety initiative Curb the Rage. The initiative looks to help the community overcome issues associated with road rage by increasing awareness and social issues, working in conjunction with key industry figures and with the help of corporate partners.

== Racing record ==
=== Karting career summary ===
Season	Series	Position
2000	Victorian Junior Karter of the Year	**1st**

=== Racing career summary ===
Season	Series	Position	Car	Team
2002	Victorian Formula Ford Championship	20th	Spectrum 06b Ford	Paul Zsidy
2003	Australian Formula Ford Championship	12th	Van Diemen RF02 Ford	Kart-Equip / Nexus Consulting
2004	Australian Formula Ford Championship	**1st**	Van Diemen RF04 Ford	Sonic Motor Racing Services
2005	Australian Carrera Cup Championship	5th	Porsche 996 GT3 Cup	Sonic Motor Racing Services
2006	Australian Carrera Cup Championship	**3rd**	Porsche 997 GT3 Cup	Sonic Motor Racing Services
2006	Australian GT Championship	10th	Porsche 996 GT3 Cup	Sonic Motor Racing Services
2007	Australian Carrera Cup Championship	**1st**	Porsche 997 GT3 Cup	Sonic Motor Racing Services
2007	V8 Supercar Championship Series	59th	Holden VE Commodore	Paul Weel Racing
2008	Fujitsu V8 Supercars Series	4th	Holden VZ Commodore	Tony D'Alberto Racing
2008	V8 Supercar Championship Series	62nd	Holden VE Commodore	HSV Dealer Team
2009	V8 Supercar Championship Series	22nd	Holden VE Commodore	Walkinshaw Racing
2010	Fujitsu V8 Supercar Series	33rd	Holden VE Commodore	Walkinshaw Performance; Eggleston Motorsport
2010	V8 Supercar Championship Series	50th	Holden VE Commodore	Walkinshaw Racing; Holden Racing Team
2011	International V8 Supercars Championship	19th	Holden VE Commodore	Kelly Racing
2012	International V8 Supercars Championship	9th	Ford FG Falcon	Rod Nash Racing
2013	International V8 Supercars Championship	9th	Ford FG Falcon	Rod Nash Racing
2014	International V8 Supercars Championship	15th	Ford FG Falcon	Rod Nash Racing
2015	International V8 Supercars Championship	**3rd**	Ford FG Falcon; Ford FG X Falcon	Rod Nash Racing
2016	International V8 Supercars Championship	16th	Holden VF Commodore	Erebus Motorsport
2017	Virgin Australia Supercars Championship	7th	Holden VF Commodore	Erebus Motorsport
2018	Virgin Australia Supercars Championship	5th	Holden ZB Commodore	Erebus Motorsport
2019	Virgin Australia Supercars Championship	6th	Holden ZB Commodore	Erebus Motorsport
2020	Virgin Australia Supercars Championship	12th	Holden ZB Commodore	Erebus Motorsport
2021	Repco Supercars Championship	18th	Ford Mustang	Kelly Grove Racing
2022	Repco Supercars Championship	8th	Ford Mustang	Grove Racing
2023	Repco Supercars Championship	9th	Ford Mustang	Grove Racing
2024	Repco Supercars Championship	13th	Chevrolet Camaro ZL1	Team 18
2025	Repco Supercars Championship	14th*	Chevrolet Camaro ZL1	Team 18

=== Super2 Series results ===
(key) (Race results only)

Super2 Series results
Year	Team	No.	Car	1	2	3	4	5	6	7	8	9	10	11	12	13	14	15	16	17	18	Position	Points
2008	Tony D'Alberto Racing	99	Holden VZ Commodore	ADE; R1; 17	ADE; R2; 9	WAK; R3; 5	WAK; R4; 3	WAK; R5; 4	SAN; R6; 5	SAN; R7; 4	SAN; R8; 3	QLD; R9; 4	QLD; R10; 6	QLD; R11; 6	WIN; R12; 5	WIN; R13; 3	WIN; R14; 3	BAT; R15; 5	BAT; R16; 4	OPR; R17; 11	OPR; R18; 5	4th	1494
2010	Eggleston Motorsport	54	Holden VE Commodore	ADE; R1	ADE; R2	QLD; R3	QLD; R4	QLD; R5	WIN; R6	WIN; R7	WIN; R8	TOW; R9; Ret	TOW; R10; 7	TOW; R11; 2	BAT; R12	BAT; R13	SAN; R14	SAN; R15	SAN; R16	SYD; R17	SYD; R18	33rd	148

=== Supercars Championship results ===
(Races in bold indicate pole position) (Races in italics indicate fastest lap)

Supercars results
Year	Team	No.	Car	1	2	3	4	5	6	7	8	9	10	11	12	13	14	15	16	17	18	19	20	21	22	23	24	25	26	27	28	29	30	31	32	33	34	35	36	37	38	39	Position	Points
2007	Paul Weel Racing	50	Holden VE Commodore	ADE; R1	ADE; R2	BAR; R3	BAR; R4	BAR; R5	PUK; R6	PUK; R7	PUK; R8	WIN; R9	WIN; R10	WIN; R11	EAS; R12	EAS; R13	EAS; R14	HDV; R15	HDV; R16	HDV; R17	QLD; R18	QLD; R19	QLD; R20	ORA; R21	ORA; R22	ORA; R23	SAN; R24; Ret	BAT; R25; DNS	SUR; R26	SUR; R27	SUR; R28	BHR; R29	BHR; R30	BHR; R31	SYM; R32	SYM; R33	SYM; R34	PHI; R35	PHI; R36	PHI; R37			NC	0
2008	HSV Dealer Team	16	Holden VE Commodore	ADE; R1	ADE; R2	EAS; R3	EAS; R4	EAS; R5	HAM; R6	HAM; R7	HAM; R8	BAR; R29	BAR; R10	BAR; R11	SAN; R12	SAN; R13	SAN; R14	HDV; R15	HDV; R16	HDV; R17	QLD; R18	QLD; R19	QLD; R20	WIN; R21	WIN; R22	WIN; R23	PHI; Q 28	PHI; R24; Ret	BAT; R25; DNS	SUR; R26	SUR; R27	SUR; R28	BHR; R29	BHR; R30	BHR; R31	SYM; R32	SYM; R33	SYM; R34	ORA; R35	ORA; R36	ORA; R37		62nd	22
2009	Walkinshaw Racing	24	Holden VE Commodore	ADE; R1; 13	ADE; R2; Ret	HAM; R3; 12	HAM; R4; 11	WIN; R5; 20	WIN; R6; 8	SYM; R7; 20	SYM; R8; 26	HDV; R9; 18	HDV; R10; 27	TOW; R11; 22	TOW; R12; 14	SAN; R13; 9	SAN; R14; Ret	QLD; R15; 20	QLD; R16; 20	PHI; Q 7	PHI; R17; 16	BAT; R18; 12	SUR; R19; 15	SUR; R20; 18	SUR; R21; 7	SUR; R22; Ret	PHI; R23; 18	PHI; R24; 18	BAR; R25; 28	BAR; R26; 15	SYD; R27; 18	SYD; R28; 11											22nd	1428
2010	Holden Racing Team	22	Holden VE Commodore	YMC; R1	YMC; R2	BHR; R3	BHR; R4	ADE; R5	ADE; R6	HAM; R7	HAM; R8	QLD; R9; PO	QLD; R10; PO	WIN; R11; PO	WIN; R12; PO	HDV; R13	HDV; R14	TOW; R15	TOW; R16	PHI; Q 9	PHI; R17; 28	BAT; R18; Ret																					50th	201
2010	Walkinshaw Racing	24	Holden VE Commodore																				SUR; R19; 17	SUR; R20; 12	SYM; R21	SYM; R22	SAN; R23	SAN; R24	SYD; R25	SYD; R26													50th	201
2011	Kelly Racing	16	Holden VE Commodore	YMC; R1; 17	YMC; R2; 4	ADE; R3; 22	ADE; R4; 14	HAM; R5; 24	HAM; R6; 20	BAR; R7; 19	BAR; R8; 20	BAR; R9; 24	WIN; R10; 22	WIN; R11; 20	HID; R12; Ret	HID; R13; 21	TOW; R14; 24	TOW; R15; 23	QLD; R16; 18	QLD; R17; 18	QLD; R18; 5	PHI; Q 6	PHI; R19; 6	BAT; R20; 19	SUR; R21; 19	SUR; R22; 11	SYM; R23; 22	SYM; R24; 22	SAN; R25; 18	SAN; R26; 13	SYD; R27; 13	SYD; R28; 13											19th	1519
2012	Rod Nash Racing	55	Ford FG Falcon	ADE; R1; Ret	ADE; R2; 7	SYM; R3; 6	SYM; R4; 26	HAM; R5; Ret	HAM; R6; 7	BAR; R7; 13	BAR; R8; 9	BAR; R9; 26	PHI; R10; 21	PHI; R11; 8	HID; R12; 5	HID; R13; 8	TOW; R14; 6	**TOW**; **R15**; **6**	QLD; R16; 22	QLD; R17; 26	SMP; R18; 13	SMP; R19; 7	SAN; Q 2	SAN; R20; 6	BAT; R21; 2	SUR; R22; Ret	SUR; R23; 13	YMC; R24; 13	YMC; R25; 7	YMC; R26; 12	WIN; R27; 11	WIN; R28; 8	SYD; R29; 17	SYD; R30; 7									9th	2187
2013	Rod Nash Racing	55	Ford FG Falcon	ADE; R1; 20	ADE; R2; Ret	SYM; R3; 14	SYM; R4; Ret	SYM; R5; 24	PUK; R6; 8	PUK; R7; 5	PUK; R8; 7	PUK; R9; 8	BAR; R10; 7	BAR; R11; 12	BAR; R12; 5	COA; R13; 11	COA; R14; 11	COA; R15; 16	COA; R16; 13	**HID**; **R17**; **14**	HID; R18; 10	**HID**; **R19**; **3**	TOW; R20; 11	TOW; R21; 26	QLD; R22; Ret	QLD; R23; 8	QLD; R24; 4	WIN; R25; 10	WIN; R26; 6	WIN; R27; 7	SAN; QR; 6	SAN; R28; 17	BAT; R29; 9	SUR; R30; 8	**SUR**; **R31**; **1**	PHI; R32; 22	PHI; R33; 9	PHI; R34; 12	SYD; R35; 11	SYD; R36; 4			9th	2058
2014	Rod Nash Racing	55	Ford FG Falcon	ADE; R1; Ret	ADE; R2; 19	ADE; R3; 7	SYM; R4; 23	SYM; R5; 15	SYM; R6; 10	WIN; R7; 11	WIN; R8; 4	WIN; R9; 5	PUK; R10; 14	PUK; R11; 8	PUK; R12; 6	PUK; R13; 17	BAR; R14; 10	BAR; R15; 9	BAR; R16; 9	HID; R17; 13	HID; R18; 9	HID; R19; 4	TOW; R20; 9	TOW; R21; 11	TOW; R22; 12	QLD; R23; 9	QLD; R24; 15	QLD; R25; 25	SMP; R26; Ret	SMP; R27; 13	SMP; R28; Ret	SAN; QR; 8	SAN; R29; 9	BAT; R30; Ret	SUR; R31; Ret	SUR; R32; 6	PHI; R33; 7	PHI; R34; 12	PHI; R35; 22	SYD; R36; 3	SYD; R37; 12	SYD; R38; 13	15th	1789
2015	Rod Nash Racing	55	Ford FG Falcon	ADE; R1; 13	ADE; R2; 17	ADE; R3; 15																																					3rd	2910
2015	Rod Nash Racing	55	Ford FG X Falcon				SYM; R4; 6	SYM; R5; 4	SYM; R6; 11	BAR; R7; 6	BAR; R8; 7	BAR; R9; 9	WIN; R10; 4	WIN; R11; 4	WIN; R12; 6	HID; R13; 16	HID; R14; 10	**HID**; **R15**; **1**	TOW; R16; 2	TOW; R17; 3	QLD; R18; 7	QLD; R19; 4	QLD; R20; 4	SMP; R21; 4	SMP; R22; 6	SMP; R23; 6	SAN; QR; 5	SAN; R24; 5	**BAT**; **R25**; **6**	SUR; R26; 2	SUR; R27; 9	PUK; R28; 3	**PUK**; **R29**; **1**	PUK; R30; 4	PHI; R31; 25	PHI; R32; 5	PHI; R33; 10	SYD; R34; 9	SYD; R35; 2	SYD; R36; 5			3rd	2910
2016	Erebus Motorsport	9	Holden VF Commodore	ADE; R1; 14	ADE; R2; 19	ADE; R3; 5	SYM; R4; 16	SYM; R5; 18	PHI; R6; 12	PHI; R7; 14	BAR; R8; 19	BAR; R9; 21	WIN; R10; 22	WIN; R11; 6	HID; R12; 17	HID; R13; 9	TOW; R14; 11	TOW; R15; 14	QLD; R16; 21	QLD; R17; 23	SMP; R18; 17	SMP; R19; 19	SAN; QR; 17	SAN; R20; DSQ	BAT; R21; 18	SUR; R22; Ret	SUR; R23; 20	PUK; R24; 13	PUK; R25; 8	PUK; R26; 17	PUK; R27; 25	SYD; R28; 10	SYD; R29; 3										16th	1564
2017	Erebus Motorsport	9	Holden VF Commodore	ADE; R1; 4	ADE; R2; 12	SYM; R3; 4	SYM; R4; 5	PHI; R5; Ret	PHI; R6; 3	BAR; R7; 9	BAR; R8; 16	WIN; R9; 4	WIN; R10; 7	HID; R11; 8	HID; R12; 7	TOW; R13; 9	TOW; R14; 11	QLD; R15; 10	QLD; R16; 9	SMP; R17; 8	SMP; R18; 9	SAN; QR; 17	SAN; R19; 17	BAT; R20; 1	SUR; R21; 17	SUR; R22; Ret	PUK; R23; 24	PUK; R24; 13	NEW; R25; 5	NEW; R26; 3													7th	2196
2018	Erebus Motorsport	9	Holden ZB Commodore	ADE; R1; 4	ADE; R2; 2	MEL; R3; 7	MEL; R4; 12	MEL; R5; 14	MEL; R6; 1	SYM; R7; 4	SYM; R8; 8	PHI; R9; 6	PHI; R10; 2	BAR; R11; 17	BAR; R12; 2	WIN; R13; 25	WIN; R14; 15	**HID**; **R15**; **3**	HID; R16; 1	TOW; R17; 7	TOW; R18; 6	QLD; R19; 7	QLD; R20; 7	SMP; R21; 7	BEN; R22; 17	BEN; R23; 3	SAN; QR; 1	**SAN**; **R24**; **5**	**BAT**; **R25**; **13**	SUR; R26; 4	**SUR**; **R27**; **C**	PUK; R28; 4	PUK; R29; 5	NEW; R30; 2	**NEW**; **R31**; **1**								5th	3206
2019	Erebus Motorsport	9	Holden ZB Commodore	ADE; R1; 8	ADE; R2; 9	MEL; R3; 10	MEL; R4; 7	MEL; R5; 4	MEL; R6; 8	SYM; R7; 6	SYM; R8; 3	PHI; R9; 4	PHI; R10; 11	BAR; R11; 10	BAR; R12; 6	WIN; R13; 3	WIN; R14; 4	HID; R15; 3	HID; R16; 2	**TOW**; **R17**; **6**	TOW; R18; 20	QLD; R19; 9	QLD; R20; 21	BEN; R21; 7	BEN; R22; 13	PUK; R23; 3	PUK; R24; 24	BAT; R25; 5	SUR; R26; 22	SUR; R27; 3	SAN; QR; 3	SAN; R28; Ret	NEW; R29; 4	NEW; R30; 16									6th	2694
2020	Erebus Motorsport	9	Holden ZB Commodore	ADE; R1; 4	ADE; R2; 8	MEL; R3; C	MEL; R4; C	MEL; R5; C	MEL; R6; C	SMP; R7; 21	SMP; R8; 5	SMP; R9; 4	SMP2; R10; 14	SMP2; R11; 11	SMP2; R12; 4	HID1; R13; 13	HID1; R14; 5	HID1; R15; 9	HID2; R16; 12	HID2; R17; 16	HID2; R18; 10	TOW1; R19; 5	TOW1; R20; 10	TOW1; R21; 11	TOW2; R22; Ret	TOW2; R23; 15	TOW2; R24; 11	BEN1; R25; 13	BEN1; R26; 7	BEN1; R27; 9	BEN2; R28; 16	BEN2; R29; Ret	BEN2; R30; 17	BAT; R31; 15									12th	1492
2021	Kelly Grove Racing	26	Ford Mustang GT	BAT1; R1; 9	BAT1; R2; 11	SAN; R3; 11	SAN; R4; 22	SAN; R5; 3	SYM; R6; 16	SYM; R7; 8	SYM; R8; 8	BEN; R9; Ret	BEN; R10; 22	BEN; R11; 12	HID; R12; 19	HID; R13; 18	HID; R14; 19	TOW1; R15; 19	TOW1; R16; 22	TOW2; R17; 15	TOW2; R18; 9	TOW2; R19; 23	SMP1; R20; 8	SMP1; R21; 9	SMP1; R22; 14	SMP2; R23	SMP2; R24	SMP2; R25	SMP3; R26	SMP3; R27	SMP3; R28	SMP4; R29; 17	SMP4; R30; C	BAT2; R31; 11									18th	1270
2022	Grove Racing	26	Ford Mustang GT	SMP; R1; 24	SMP; R2; 9	SYM; R3; 21	SYM; R4; 3	SYM; R5; 4	**MEL**; **R6**; **2**	MEL; R7; 2	MEL; R8; 3	MEL; R9; Ret	BAR; R10; 4	BAR; R11; 11	BAR; R12; 6	WIN; R13; 3	WIN; R14; 3	WIN; R15; 4	HID; R16; 25	HID; R17; 5	HID; R18; 12	TOW; R19; 18	TOW; R20; 11	BEN; R21; 8	BEN; R22; 8	BEN; R23; 22	SAN; R24; 12	SAN; R25; 4	SAN; R26; 9	PUK; R27; 9	PUK; R28; 7	PUK; R29; 8	BAT; R30; Ret	**SUR**; **R31**; **2**	SUR; R32; 4	ADE; R33; 11	ADE; R34; 15						8th	2132
2023	Grove Racing	26	Ford Mustang GT S650	NEW; R1; 12	**NEW**; **R2**; **3**	MEL; R3; 19	MEL; R4; 23	MEL; R5; 14	MEL; R6; 8	BAR; R7; 3	BAR; R8; 14	BAR; R9; 4	SYM; R10; 16	SYM; R11; 23	SYM; R12; 12	HID; R13; 20	HID; R14; 22	HID; R15; 12	TOW; R16; 21	TOW; R17; 17	SMP; R18; Ret	SMP; R19; 20	BEN; R20; 13	BEN; R21; 4	BEN; R22; 20	SAN; R23; Ret	BAT; R24; 5	SUR; R25; 3	SUR; R26; 1	ADE; R27; 2	ADE; R28; 3												9th	1806
2024	Team 18	20	Chevrolet Camaro ZL1	BAT1; R1; 8	BAT1; R2; 6	MEL; R3; 16	MEL; R4; 11	MEL; R5; 4	MEL; R6; 9	TAU; R7; 16	TAU; R8; 24	BAR; R9; 17	BAR; R10; 10	HID; R11; 6	HID; R12; 12	TOW; R13; 15	TOW; R14; 22	SMP; R15; 17	SMP; R16; 17	SYM; R17; 9	SYM; R18; 22	SAN; R19; 8	BAT2; R20; 24	SUR; R21; 6	SUR; R22; 10	ADE; R23; 23	ADE; R24; 11																13th	1615
2025	Team 18	20	Chevrolet Camaro ZL1	SYD; R1; 15	SYD; R2; 22	SYD; R3; 22	MEL; R4; 17	MEL; R5; 23	MEL; R6; 17	MEL; R7; C	TAU; R8; 11	TAU; R9; 17	TAU; R10; 17	SYM; R11; 19	SYM; R12; 9	SYM; R13; 6	BAR; R14; 16	BAR; R15; 19	BAR; R16; 7	HID; R17; 19	HID; R18; Ret	HID; R19; 15	TOW; R20; 20	**TOW**; **R21**; 10	TOW; R22; 21	QLD; R23; 24	QLD; R24; 9	QLD; R25; 11	BEN; R26; 13	BAT; R27; 2	SUR; R28; 14	SUR; R29; 12	SAN; R30; 19	SAN; R31; 9	ADE; R32; 20	ADE; R33; 11	ADE; R34; 11						13th	1476
2026	Team 18	20	Chevrolet Camaro ZL1	SMP; R1; 12	SMP; R2; 5	SMP; R3; 16	MEL; R4; 15	MEL; R5; 19	MEL; R6; 7	MEL; R7; 11	TAU; R8; 10	TAU; R9; 19	CHR; R10; Ret	CHR; R11; 21	CHR; R12; 19	CHR; R13; 13	SYM; R14; 2	SYM; R15; 17	SYM; R16; 16	HID; R20; 23	HID; R21; 17	HID; R22; 10	TOW; R23; 16	TOW; R24; 10	TOW; R25; 12	BAR; R17; 19	BAR; R18; 15	BAR; R19; 9	QLD; R26; 20	QLD; R27; 8	QLD; R28; 9	BEN; R28; 22	BAT; R30; 17	SUR; R31; 2	SUR; R32; 22	SAN; R33	SAN; R34	ADE; R35	ADE; R36	ADE; R37			15th*	872*

=== Complete Bathurst 1000 results ===
Year	Team	Car	Co-driver	Position	Laps
2007	Paul Weel Racing	Holden Commodore VE	(Australia) Cameron McConville	DNS	0
2008	HSV Dealer Team	Holden Commodore VE	(Australia) Paul Dumbrell (Australia) Rick Kelly‡	20th	127
2009	Walkinshaw Racing	Holden Commodore VE	(United Kingdom) Andy Priaulx	12th	161
2010	Holden Racing Team	Holden Commodore VE	(Australia) Will Davison	DNF	152
2011	Kelly Racing	Holden Commodore VE	(Australia) Tim Blanchard	19th	161
2012	Rod Nash Racing	Ford Falcon FG	(Australia) Dean Canto	**2nd**	161
2013	Rod Nash Racing	Ford Falcon FG	(Australia) Dean Canto	9th	161
2014	Rod Nash Racing	Ford Falcon FG	(Australia) Dean Canto	DNF	117
2015	Rod Nash Racing	Ford Falcon FG X	(Australia) Dean Canto	6th	161
2016	Erebus Motorsport	Holden Commodore VF	(New Zealand) Craig Baird	18th	148
2017	Erebus Motorsport	Holden Commodore VF	(Australia) Luke Youlden	**1st**	161
2018	Erebus Motorsport	Holden Commodore ZB	(Australia) Luke Youlden	13th	161
2019	Erebus Motorsport	Holden Commodore ZB	(Australia) Luke Youlden	5th	161
2020	Erebus Motorsport	Holden Commodore ZB	(Australia) Will Brown	15th	160
2021	Kelly Grove Racing	Ford Mustang S550	(Australia) Luke Youlden	11th	161
2022	Grove Racing	Ford Mustang S550	(Australia) Matthew Campbell	DNF	4
2023	Grove Racing	Ford Mustang S650	(Australia) Garth Tander	5th	161
2024	Charlie Schwerkolt Racing	Chevrolet Camaro Mk.6	(Australia) Warren Luff	24th	159
2025	Charlie Schwerkolt Racing	Chevrolet Camaro Mk.6	(Australia) Lee Holdsworth	**2nd**	161
2026	Charlie Schwerkolt Racing	Chevrolet Camaro Mk.6	(Australia) James Courtney		

‡ Rick Kelly replaced Reynolds in the #16 post-qualifying after a severe accident for Rick's original car.

== External References ==
- David Reynolds's website
- Reynolds's profile at Supercars Australia
- David Reynolds driver statistics at Racing-Reference
- David Reynolds career summary at DriverDB.com

Sporting positions
Preceded by Will Davison; Jonathon Webb	Winner of the Bathurst 1000; 2017 (with Luke Youlden)	Succeeded by Craig Lowndes; Steven Richards
Awards and achievements
Preceded by Scott McLaughlin	Barry Sheene Medal; 2017 & 2018	Succeeded by Shane van Gisbergen
