= 2004 Australian Formula Ford Championship =

Racing competition in Australia

The 2004 Australian Formula Ford Championship was an Australian motor racing competition open to Formula Ford racing cars. The championship was managed by the Formula Ford Association Inc. and was promoted as the 2004 Ford Racing Australian Formula Ford Championship. It is recognised by the Confederation of Australian Motor Sport (CAMS) as the 12th Australian Formula Ford Championship.

The championship was won by David Reynolds driving a Van Diemen RF04.

== Teams and drivers ==
The following teams and drivers contested the 2004 Australian Formula Ford Championship. All teams were Australian-registered.

Team	Chassis	No	Driver	Rounds
BF Racing	Van Diemen RF03	2	(Australia) Brett Francis	All
Sonic Motor Racing Services	Van Diemen RF04	3	(Australia) Bryce Washington	1–7
Sonic Motor Racing Services	Van Diemen RF04	4	(Australia) Michael Trimble	All
Sonic Motor Racing Services	Van Diemen RF04	5	(Australia) James Small	All
Sonic Motor Racing Services	Van Diemen RF04	6	(Australia) David Reynolds	All
Interpak Racing	Spectrum 09	7	(Australia) Stephen Austin	1–2
Pettaras Press Racing	Van Diemen RF01	8	(Australia) Anthony Preston	2, 6
QLD Group	Van Diemen RF93	9	(Australia) Daniel Pappas	4
James Small Racing	Mygale SJ01	9	(Australia) Troy Woolston	8
Maxim Constructions	Van Diemen RF01	10	(Australia) Clayton Pyne	1–3, 6, 8
Mid Coast Ford	Van Diemen RF01	11	(Australia) Joel Spychala	2, 6
Henderson Motorsport	Van Diemen RF01	12	(Australia) Michael Henderson	3
Glenn McNally	Spectrum 06B	14	(Australia) Glenn McNally	3, 7
Team Beta Racing	Van Diemen RF91	15	(Australia) Grant Doulman	1–2, 6
HSE Mining/North City Holden	Van Diemen RF01	16	(Australia) Mark Douglas	3
Fuchs Lubricants	Van Diemen RF92	16	(Australia) Robert Storey	6
S&D Welch Removals	Mygale SJ98	17	(Australia) Glenn Welch	1–2, 4, 6
Fastlane Racing	Van Diemen RF04	18	(Australia) Dean Fiore	All
Fastlane Racing	Van Diemen RF90	31	(Australia) Adrian Corp	1–3
Fastlane Racing	Van Diemen RF04	32	(Australia) Nathan Caratti	1, 3, 8
Fastlane Racing	Van Diemen RF90	34	(Australia) Craig Jorgensen	3
Fastlane Racing	Van Diemen RF93	40	(Australia) Todd Fiore	3
Brad Jones Racing	Van Diemen RF04	20	(Australia) Kim Jones	5
Aaron Caratti	Van Diemen RF92	22	(Australia) Aaron Caratti	8
Sieders Racing Team	Stealth Van Diemen RF94	23	(Australia) David Sieders	All
Ben Fitzgerald	Van Diemen RF01	24	(Australia) Tim Slade	1–2
Borland Racing Developments	Spectrum 010	25	(Australia) Tim Macrow	All
Borland Racing Developments	Spectrum 010	26	(Australia) Steve Owen	All
Borland Racing Developments	Spectrum 09C	50	(Australia) Brett Hobson	6
Minda Motorsport	Spectrum 07	27	(Australia) Dominic Kennedy	1, 5, 7
Collex/Davies Craig	Spectrum 010	28	(Australia) Cade Southall	1–2, 8
Triple F Racing	Van Diemen RF94	30	(Australia) Paul Fiore	3
Thrifty Car Rentals	Van Diemen RF	30	(Australia) Trent Usher	4
Tony LeMessurier	Van Diemen	37	(Australia) Tristan Hughes	4, 6, 8
Arrow Karts	Spectrum 09	39	(Australia) Shane Price	5, 7–8
Toshiba Mobile Computers	Ray 95	42	(Australia) Samantha Reid	7
Peter George	Spectrum 07	44	(Australia) Peter George	3
Alex Davison	Van Diemen RF01	44	(Australia) James Davison	5, 8
IM Racing	Van Diemen RF01	45	(Australia) Ian Moncrieff	2–8
Sign Point/Shell	Van Diemen RF98	46	(Australia) Dale Wood	6, 8
Antunes Lawyers	Van Diemen RF94	48	(Australia) Nathan Antunes	6
K&A Motorsport	Van Diemen RF01	50	(Australia) Graham Knuckey	7
Net Velocity	Spectrum 07	55	(Australia) William Hall	3
Tomahawk Management	Van Diemen RF96	60	(Australia) Derryn Harrison	2
Tomahawk Management	Spectrum 06B	96	(Australia) Wensley Carroll	2
Roman Krumins Motorsport	Vector MG096	61	(Australia) Roman Krumins	4
Latitude Development Group	Spectrum 010	62	(Australia) Andrew Thompson	All
Team Henderson	Spectrum 07	65	(Australia) Andrew Goldie	3
Rachel Smeaton	Spectrum 07	72	(Australia) Rachel Smeaton	1–2, 4–6
Nomad Racing	Spectrum 010	74	(Australia) Mark McNally	All
Project Motorsports	Spectrum 09	77	(New Zealand) Jason Liefting	All
Speco Thomas/VHT	Spectrum 06	78	(Australia) Brian Sampson	8
O'Brien Motorsport	Van Diemen RF03	79	(Australia) Shannon O'Brien	All
Subway D.C.	Van Diemen RF90	88	(Australia) Justin Locke	3
Merkin Racing	Van Diemen RF90	90	(Australia) Tim Davies	3
John McCowan	Van Diemen RF90	92	(Australia) John McCowan	3
Port Kennedy Tyre & Brake Cent	Van Diemen RF96	94	(Australia) Jason Youd	3
Varcon Office Solutions	Van Diemen RF02	95	(Australia) Laurence Burford	2

== Calendar ==
The championship was contested over an eight round series with three races per round.

Round	Circuit	Dates	Supporting	Map
1	(Tasmania) Wakefield Park Raceway	20–22 February	Konica Minolta V8 Supercar Series	2004 Australian Formula Ford Championship is located in Australia
2	(New South Wales) Eastern Creek Raceway	2–4 April	V8 Supercar Championship Series	2004 Australian Formula Ford Championship is located in Australia
3	(Western Australia) Barbagallo Raceway	11–13 June	V8 Supercar Championship Series	2004 Australian Formula Ford Championship is located in Australia
4	Queensland Raceway	2–4 July	V8 Supercar Championship Series	2004 Australian Formula Ford Championship is located in Australia
5	(Victoria (state)) Winton Motor Raceway	23–25 July	V8 Supercar Championship Series	2004 Australian Formula Ford Championship is located in Australia
6	(New South Wales) Oran Park Raceway	13–15 August	V8 Supercar Championship Series	2004 Australian Formula Ford Championship is located in Australia
7	(South Australia) Mallala Motor Sport Park	20–22 August	Konica Minolta V8 Supercar Series	2004 Australian Formula Ford Championship is located in Australia
8	(Victoria (state)) Sandown Raceway	10–12 September	V8 Supercar Championship Series	2004 Australian Formula Ford Championship is located in Australia

== Season summary ==
Rd	Race	Circuit	Pole position	Fastest lap	Winning driver	Winning team	Round Winner
1	1	(New South Wales) Wakefield Park Raceway	(Australia) Bryce Washington	(Australia) David Reynolds	(Australia) Brett Francis	BF Racing	(Australia) Bryce Washington
1	2	(New South Wales) Wakefield Park Raceway		(Australia) Brett Francis	(Australia) Brett Francis	BF Racing	(Australia) Bryce Washington
1	3	(New South Wales) Wakefield Park Raceway		(Australia) Brett Francis	(Australia) Tim Macrow	Borland Racing Developments	(Australia) Bryce Washington
2	1	(New South Wales) Eastern Creek Raceway	(Australia) James Small	(Australia) Michael Trimble	(Australia) Michael Trimble	Sonic Motor Racing Services	(Australia) James Small
2	2	(New South Wales) Eastern Creek Raceway		(Australia) Brett Francis	(Australia) James Small	Sonic Motor Racing Services	(Australia) James Small
2	3	(New South Wales) Eastern Creek Raceway		(Australia) Steve Owen	(Australia) Steve Owen	Borland Racing Developments	(Australia) James Small
3	1	(Western Australia) Wanneroo Raceway	(Australia) Bryce Washington	(Australia) Bryce Washington	(Australia) Dean Fiore	Fastlane Racing	(Australia) Dean Fiore
3	2	(Western Australia) Wanneroo Raceway		(Australia) David Reynolds	(Australia) Dean Fiore	Fastlane Racing	(Australia) Dean Fiore
3	3	(Western Australia) Wanneroo Raceway		(Australia) James Small	(Australia) Dean Fiore	Fastlane Racing	(Australia) Dean Fiore
4	1	Queensland Raceway	(Australia) Steve Owen	(Australia) David Reynolds	(Australia) Steve Owen	Borland Racing Developments	(Australia) Steve Owen
4	2	Queensland Raceway		(Australia) Brett Francis	(Australia) Steve Owen	Borland Racing Developments	(Australia) Steve Owen
4	3	Queensland Raceway		(Australia) Brett Francis	(Australia) Steve Owen	Borland Racing Developments	(Australia) Steve Owen
5	1	(Victoria (state)) Winton Motor Raceway	(Australia) James Small	(New Zealand) Jason Liefting	(Australia) Steve Owen	Borland Racing Developments	(New Zealand) Jason Liefting
5	2	(Victoria (state)) Winton Motor Raceway		(Australia) James Small	(Australia) Steve Owen	Borland Racing Developments	(New Zealand) Jason Liefting
5	3	(Victoria (state)) Winton Motor Raceway		(Australia) Bryce Washington	(New Zealand) Jason Liefting	Project Sports	(New Zealand) Jason Liefting
6	1	(New South Wales) Oran Park Raceway	(Australia) Tim Macrow	(Australia) David Sieders	(Australia) Tim Macrow	Borland Racing Developments	(Australia) Tim Macrow
6	2	(New South Wales) Oran Park Raceway		(Australia) Tim Macrow	(Australia) David Reynolds	Sonic Motor Racing Services	(Australia) Tim Macrow
6	3	(New South Wales) Oran Park Raceway		(Australia) David Sieders	(Australia) Tim Macrow	Borland Racing Developments	(Australia) Tim Macrow
7	1	(South Australia) Mallala Motor Sport Park	(Australia) James Small	(Australia) James Small	(Australia) James Small	Sonic Motor Racing Services	(Australia) Steve Owen
7	2	(South Australia) Mallala Motor Sport Park		(Australia) Steve Owen	(Australia) Steve Owen	Borland Racing Developments	(Australia) Steve Owen
7	3	(South Australia) Mallala Motor Sport Park		(Australia) James Small	(Australia) Steve Owen	Borland Racing Developments	(Australia) Steve Owen
8	1	(Victoria (state)) Sandown Raceway	(Australia) David Reynolds	(Australia) Steve Owen	(Australia) Steve Owen	Borland Racing Developments	(Australia) David Reynolds
8	2	(Victoria (state)) Sandown Raceway		(Australia) Steve Owen	(Australia) Steve Owen	Borland Racing Developments	(Australia) David Reynolds
8	3	(Victoria (state)) Sandown Raceway		(Australia) James Small	(Australia) James Small	Sonic Motor Racing Services	(Australia) David Reynolds

== Championship standings ==
Championship points were awarded on a 20-16-14-12-10-8-6-4-2-1 basis to the top ten finishers at each race. An additional point was awarded to the driver achieving pole position for the first race at each round.

Position	1st	2nd	3rd	4th	5th	6th	7th	8th	9th	10th	Pole
Points	20	16	14	12	10	8	6	4	2	1	1

Pos.	Driver	(New South Wales) WAK			(New South Wales) EAS			(Western Australia) BAR			(Queensland) QUE			(Victoria (state)) WIN			(New South Wales) ORA			(South Australia) MAL			(Victoria (state)) SAN			Pts
Pos.	Driver	R1	R2	R3	R1	R2	R3	R1	R2	R3	R1	R2	R3	R1	R2	R3	R1	R2	R3	R1	R2	R3	R1	R2	R3	Pts
1	(Australia) David Reynolds	4	4	Ret	6	12	3	5	4	2	2	2	4	Ret	5	Ret	2	1	2	2	2	2	2	2	2	287
2	(Australia) Tim Macrow	9	5	1	5	4	7	4	2	4	6	3	3	7	Ret	7	1	2	1	4	3	3	4	4	4	285
3	(Australia) Steve Owen	Ret	14	19	22	9	1	Ret	Ret	15	1	1	1	1	1	Ret	9	3	3	3	1	1	1	1	Ret	247
4	(Australia) Brett Francis	1	1	12	4	2	4	3	3	3	7	4	2	12	18	6	7	6	5	9	9	8	5	5	6	230
5	(Australia) James Small	3	3	11	2	1	2	Ret	8	Ret	Ret	7	Ret	2	7	Ret	8	17	20	1	DSQ	7	16	6	1	170
6	(Australia) Dean Fiore	7	8	18	8	5	16	1	1	1	3	5	6	5	13	2	10	8	9	11	7	4	3	3	5	167
7	(Australia) Bryce Washington	2	2	4	9	Ret	12	2	Ret	DNS	4	8	5	11	8	8	5	14	Ret	5	5	11				128
8	(New Zealand) Jason Liefting	14	16	3	14	8	10	6	6	6	8	6	11	3	4	1	Ret	Ret	17	10	4	9	DNS	8	Ret	122
9	(Australia) Michael Trimble	5	13	13	1	3	20	8	Ret	13	Ret	Ret	7	4	2	Ret	11	12	11	7	12	10	7	10	3	108
10	(Australia) David Sieders	6	11	6	15	11	9	Ret	Ret	DNS	5	15	8	10	3	Ret	13	7	6	6	6	Ret	Ret	9	7	89
11	(Australia) Andrew Thompson	8	6	9	7	6	5	Ret	13	Ret	9	Ret	10	16	6	Ret	16	9	8	12	11	14	8	7	9	73
12	(Australia) Anthony Preston				3	Ret	8										3	4	4							56
13	(Australia) Shane Price													6	12	5				8	8	5	6	DNS	DNS	46
14	(Australia) Shannon O'Brien	16	DNS	7	17	Ret	11	7	Ret	11	Ret	10	Ret	Ret	14	3	12	Ret	14	16	10	6	14	Ret	10	38
15	(Australia) Clayton Pyne	15	DNS	DNS	12	7	14										6	5	7				19	15	8	36
16	(Australia) Mark McNally	10	7	5	13	13	15	Ret	15	10	11	9	Ret	8	10	Ret	17	13	13	13	16	13	Ret	12	12	25
17	(Australia) Joel Spychala				11	10	6										4	21	12							21
18	(Australia) Glenn Welch	11	10	2	DNS	DNS	DNS				Ret	14	13				14	11	18							17
18	(Australia) Mark Douglas							10	5	7																17
20	(Australia) Todd Fiore							18	7	5																16
21	(Australia) James Davison													14	11	4							DNS	DNS	DNS	12
22	(Australia) Cade Southall	12	9	8	10	DNS	13																9	14	Ret	11
23	(Australia) Nathan Caratti	17	DNS	14				23	12	8													10	Ret	13	6
23	(Australia) Aaron Caratti							9	9	14													11	11	Ret	6
25	(Australia) Ian Moncrieff				18	16	19	13	Ret	Ret	13	13	12	13	9	9	22	Ret	21	14	13	12	18	17	Ret	4
26	(Australia) Dominic Kennedy	Ret	15	15										9	15	10				19	17	15				3
27	(Australia) Paul Fiore							Ret	11	9																2
27	(Australia) Daniel Pappas										12	11	9													2
29	(Australia) Tim Slade	13	12	10	DNS	DNS	DNS																			1
29	(Australia) William Hall							16	10	12																1
29	(Australia) Tristan Hughes										10	Ret	Ret				21	18	15				15	16	15	1
29	(Australia) Brett Hobson																15	10	Ret							1
29	(Australia) Robert Storey																18	15	10							1
29	(Australia) Troy Woolston																						13	13	11	1
-	(Australia) Grant Doulman	18	DNS	18	19	14	DNS										20	19	16							0
-	(Australia) Rachel Smeaton	19	DNS	DNS	23	19	22				16	17	14	15	17	12	23	20	22							0
-	(Australia) Stephen Austin	20	DNS	17	16	15	17																			0
-	(Australia) Derryn Harrison				21	18	21																			0
-	(Australia) Wensley Carroll				20	17	23																			0
-	(Australia) Laurence Burford				Ret	DNS	18																			0
-	(Australia) Michael Henderson							11	Ret	DNS																0
-	(Australia) Justin Locke							12	14	16																0
-	(Australia) Craig Jorgensen							14	18	Ret																0
-	(Australia) John McCowan							15	Ret	DNS																0
-	(Australia) Glenn McNally							17	16	Ret										18	18	17				0
-	(Australia) Tim Davies							19	Ret	18																0
-	(Australia) Peter George							20	DNS	DNS																0
-	(Australia) Jason Youd							21	20	19																0
-	(Australia) Andrew Goldie							22	19	20																0
-	(Australia) Adrian Corp							Ret	17	17																0
-	(Australia) Trent Usher										14	12	Ret													0
-	(Australia) Roman Krumins										15	16	Ret													0
-	(Australia) Kim Jones													DNS	16	11										0
-	(Australia) Dale Wood																19	16	19				12	18	14	0
-	(Australia) Nathan Antunes																24	Ret	DNS							0
-	(Australia) Samantha Reid																			15	14	16				0
-	(Australia) Graham Knuckey																			17	15	Ret				0
-	(Australia) Brian Sampson																						17	19	16	0
Pos.	Driver	(New South Wales) WAK			(New South Wales) EAS			(Western Australia) BAR			(Queensland) QUE			(Victoria (state)) WIN			(New South Wales) ORA			(South Australia) MAL			(Victoria (state)) SAN			Pts
