= Van Diemen RF93 =

Open-wheel car chassis

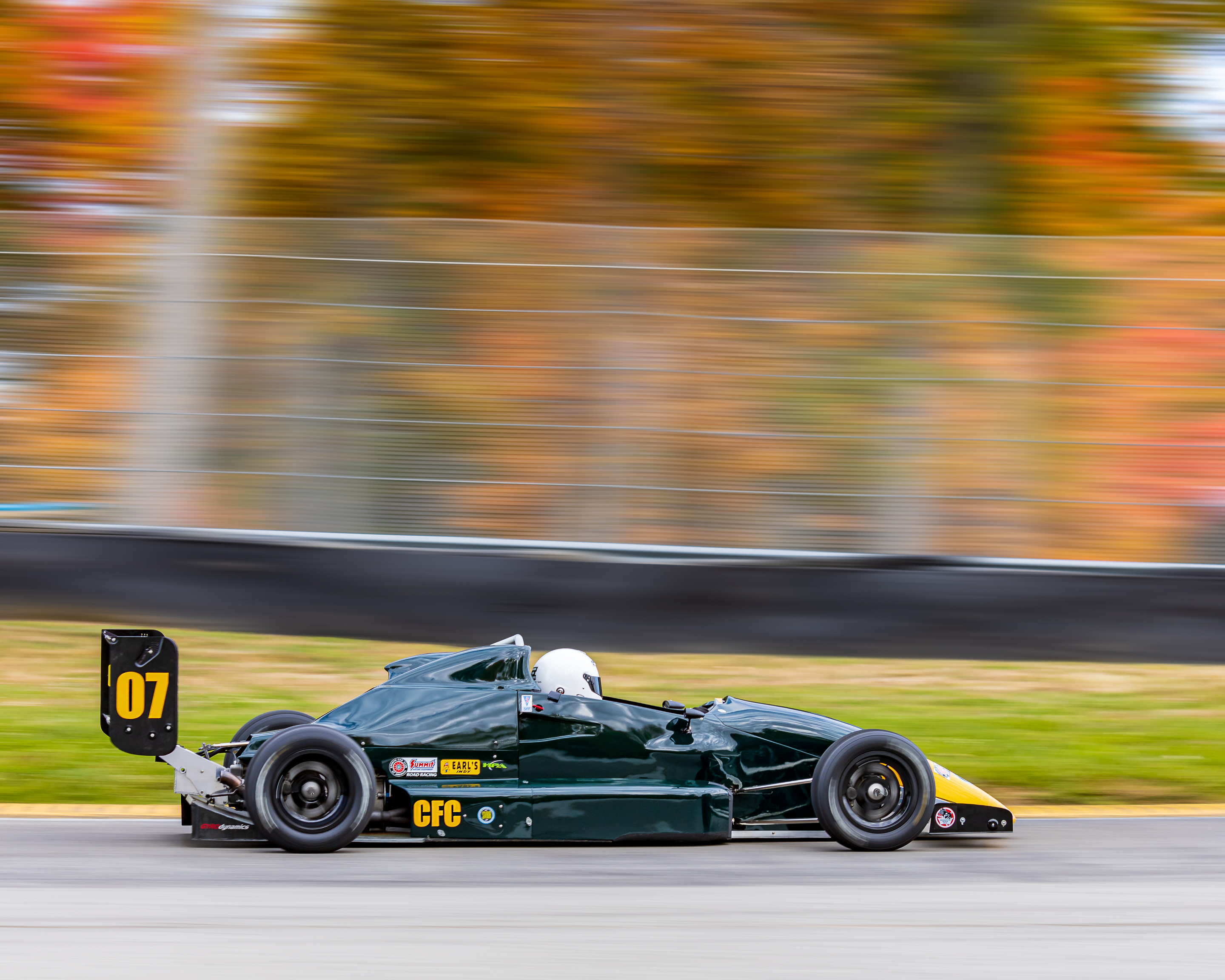
- Category: Formula Ford
- Constructor: Van Diemen

Technical specifications
- Chassis: Steel spaceframe
- Suspension: Double wishbones, push-rod actuated coil springs over shock absorbers, anti-roll bars
- Engine: Mid-engine, longitudinally mounted, 2.0 L (122.0 cu in), Ford, SOHC I4, N/A
- Transmission: Hewland LD200 4-speed manual
- Power: 137 hp (102 kW)
- Weight: 440 kg (970 lb)
- Tires: Goodyear

Competition history

The Van Diemen RF93, and its evolution, the RF94, were open-wheel formula race car chassis, designed, developed, and built by British manufacturer and race car constructor Van Diemen, for Formula Ford race categories, in 1993.
