= Peregrine Corporation =

Australian retail corporation

- Type: Private
- Industry: Retail
- Founded: 1984; 42 years ago
- Founder: Fred Shahin
- Headquarters: Adelaide, South Australia
- Products: Service stations; Convenience store; Tobacconist; Vape Shop; Variety Store
- Owner: Shahin family
- Number of employees: 6,500 (2020)
- Website: www.peregrine.com.au

The Peregrine Corporation is an Australian privately-owned company headquartered in Adelaide, South Australia. It formed and until April 2023 operated the On the Run brand of service stations and convenience store in South Australia, and the Smokemart and Giftbox (tobacconists /vape shops and variety retail stores) nationwide. Peregrine owns The Bend Motorsport Park at Tailem Bend, and the Mallala Motor Sport Park.

The company was founded by Fred (Fathi) Shahin in 1984 with the purchase of a BP service station in Woodville. Peregrine bought the Mobil fuel outlets in South Australia in 2010 and 25 company-owned BP outlets in 2014. The acquired sites were rebranded and upgraded to 24-hour OTR convenience stores along with the service stations. In 2020 Peregrine was listed at number 15 in the Australian Financial Review's "Top 500 Private Companies", with an estimated annual revenue of $2.6 billion.

== History ==
On 15 May 1948, Fathi (Fred) Shahin and his family moved to Lebanon following their expulsion from Palestine after the 1948 Arab–Israeli War and the Israeli Declaration of Independence. Shahin was ten at the time. Shahin later went to night school to qualify as an accountant. Shahin's son Khalil (Charlie) Shahin later stated that his father's training and occupation was pivotal to the company's success, as he acted as a "de-facto CFO". After working as an auditor for the United Nations for 27 years, Fred and his family migrated to Sydney, Australia in 1984, and after six weeks moved to Adelaide.

When he could not find work, he bought a BP service station in the Adelaide suburb of Woodville, and the family lived on site. Peregrine was founded in 1984 with the purchase of the service station, soon followed by a chain of Smokemart (tobacco retailer) stores across Adelaide.

After Fred's death, three of his sons, Yasser, Khalil (Charlie) and Samer (Sam) took over the business.

Peregrine bought 29 Mobil fuel outlets in South Australia in 2010 and 25 BP-owned outlets in 2014. The acquired sites were rebranded and upgraded to 24-hour On The Run sites. By April 2023, Peregrine owned a chain of more than 170 OTR convenience stores and service stations. The Shahin family were included on the BRW Rich 200 list in 2014.

In 2015 Peregrine announced plans to redevelop the former Mitsubishi Motors Australia test site outside Tailem Bend as The Bend Motorsport Park, that opened in 2017, and in May 2017, announced the purchase of the Mallala Motor Sport Park.

In 2016, Peregrine acquired the rights to operate Guzman y Gomez restaurants in South Australia.

In 2020, Peregrine Corporation was listed at number nine in the Australian Financial Reviews "Top 500 Private Companies", with an estimated annual revenue of $2.6 billion. As of September 2020, Peregrine was the 9th largest privately owned company in Australia, and the largest in South Australia.

In April 2023 Peregrine Corporation agreed terms to sell its OTR service station chain to Viva Energy. The transaction is subject to Australian Competition & Consumer Commission and Foreign Investment Review Board clearance. The acquisition also includes Peregrine's businesses of Smokemart and Giftbox (SMGB) and Mogas. The Shahin family will also be a shareholder of Viva Energy. The Shahin family's ownership of the Peregrine Property, Construction & Development (PCI) and Motorsport (The Bend and Mallala) divisions remains unchanged.

In February 2024, Charlie (Khalil), separate to Peregrine, through his company Atayf purchased Aileron Station and the nearby Oolloo Farm (now Katayf farm) in the Northern Territory. Aileron produces beef and Katayf produces fodder.

=== Controversies ===
Nasmin Pty Ltd, the registered owner of Nasmin Farm, was fined $28,000 for the 2012 dumping of 2,000 tonnes (2,200 short tons) of slightly contaminated soil, taken from the redevelopment of an On the Run store located on Nasmin Farm.

In 2018 the OTR brand of the company received significant criticism from consumers and environmental groups for a decision to ban reusable coffee cups, amongst growing concerns of the negative effect of the 1.2 billion disposable cups that end-up in landfill in Australia each year.

A class action on behalf of 1,050 On the Run workers was lodged with the Federal Court of Australia on 13 May 2020. The company was accused of failing to pay overtime, underpaying staff and misusing its traineeship program as a method to reduce workers' pay, dating back to 2014 and involving all stores in South Australia. OTR allegedly used eight different wage minimisation tactics that enabled gross underpayment of its staff. In March 2020, the Federal Court had upheld a separate decision by the South Australian Employment Tribunal to award $2,342 to an OTR employee who had been underpaid. In August 2020 Peregrine was ordered by the South Australian Employment Tribunal to pay $65,000 to an employee after being found to have deliberately underpaid him over the period of a year in 2016, at an OTR at Fulham.

In 2020 there was opposition by local residents to a planned OTR outlet on Kensington Road in Kensington Park, and to the expansion of the Peregrine headquarters building in Kensington to a height of seven storeys with a helipad on top of the building.
