= Newcastle 500 =

Supercars racing event in New South Wales, Australia

(New South Wales) Newcastle 500
- Race Information
Venue	Newcastle Street Circuit
Number of times held	4
First held	2017
Last held	2023
- Race Format
- Race 1
Laps	95
Distance	250 km
- Race 2
Laps	95
Distance	250 km
- Last Event (2023)
- Overall Winner
(Australia) Chaz Mostert	Walkinshaw Andretti United
- Race Winners
(Australia) Cam Waters	Tickford Racing
(New Zealand) Shane van Gisbergen	Triple Eight Race Engineering

The Newcastle 500 was an annual motor racing event for Supercars, held at the Newcastle Street Circuit in Newcastle, New South Wales, Australia in 2017, 2018, 2019 and 2023. The event was not held in 2020, 2021 and 2022 due to the COVID-19 pandemic.

== Format ==
The event was staged over a three-day weekend, from Friday to Sunday.

== History ==
From 2009 until 2016, the final event on the Supercars calendar was the Sydney 500 at the Homebush Street Circuit. Following the demise of the event, Supercars opened discussions with Destination NSW for a replacement event in the state. Initial plans for a race at Gosford on the state's Central Coast fell through after several months of negotiations, leaving Newcastle as the leading alternative. In September 2016, Newcastle's place as the final event of the 2017 season was confirmed in an announcement made by Supercars CEO James Warburton and Premier Mike Baird. In December 2016, the track layout and a November 2017 date for the inaugural event were confirmed.

The first two events in 2017 and 2018 both saw close championship deciders involving Scott McLaughlin. The inaugural event culminated in the 2017 championship being decided in the final minutes of the Sunday race with McLaughlin requiring no worse than an 11th-place finish to win the championship over Jamie Whincup after winning the Saturday race with Whincup 21st. McLaughlin was running in 11th on the penultimate lap of the final race before an incident with Craig Lowndes exiting the first corner. Following an immediate stewards review, McLaughlin was given a time penalty for the contact with Lowndes, which awarded a record seventh championship to Whincup.

McLaughlin again entered the 2018 event in championship contention, this time against Whincup's team-mate Shane van Gisbergen. In the Saturday race, van Gisbergen overtook McLaughlin on the final lap as McLaughlin ran low on fuel. Van Gisbergen was then given a post-race penalty for a pitlane infringement which pushed him to fifth in the final results. McLaughlin then finished second in the Sunday race to secure his first championship title, only conceding the race lead in the late stages to David Reynolds, who scored the most points at the event for the second consecutive year. The result meant that the Ford Falcon won the championship in its final scheduled championship entry and the event was also the final drive of Craig Lowndes' full-time career.

The 2019 event began under controversial circumstances, with a number of drivers criticising the legitimacy of McLaughlin's successful title defence based on parity concerns regarding his Ford Mustang S550. Held under smoggy skies due to the impacts of the 2019–20 Australian bushfire season, Triple Eight Race Engineering dominated the event with Van Gisbergen winning the Saturday race and Whincup the Sunday race.

The planned 2020 event was cancelled due to the COVID-19 pandemic, and was again excluded from the 2021 calendar. It was confirmed in December 2020 that the event would be the opening round of the 2022 Supercars Championship in early 2022. However, due to the outbreak of the Omicron variant of COVID-19, the 2022 event was cancelled, with the event later confirmed to return as the opening round of the 2023 Supercars Championship.

The 2023 event saw the début of Supercars' Gen3 regulations. Van Gisbergen initially won the season-opening Saturday race ahead of Triple Eight team-mate Broc Feeney, only for the pair to have their results annulled due to a technical breach which occurred in pit lane; this saw Cam Waters, who initially finished in third place, promoted to the top of the podium. Van Gisbergen won the second race of the weekend after a late-race pass on Chaz Mostert, which was shortened by six laps following a first-lap crash involving Declan Fraser and Macauley Jones.

After the 2023 edition concluded, the future of the event became uncertain following disagreement between the New South Wales state government and Newcastle City Council over the length of a proposed event contract extension. Across March–April 2023, a non-binding survey was conducted by KPMG on the events' popularity with local residents; despite data being compromised due to residents' ability to submit multiple responses, a notionally negative-majority result led to Tim Crakanthorp, the state member for Newcastle, withdrawing his support for the event.

On 19 October 2023, Newcastle Lord Mayor Nuatali Nelmes confirmed the event had been cancelled despite NSW Premier Chris Minns claiming the state government still supported the event. In December 2023, the council voted to remove the permanent section of track precluding the event being held again, with works to restore permanent infrastructure beginning in June 2024 – the council instead providing support for the City of Cessnock's bid to host a replacement event.

== Winners ==
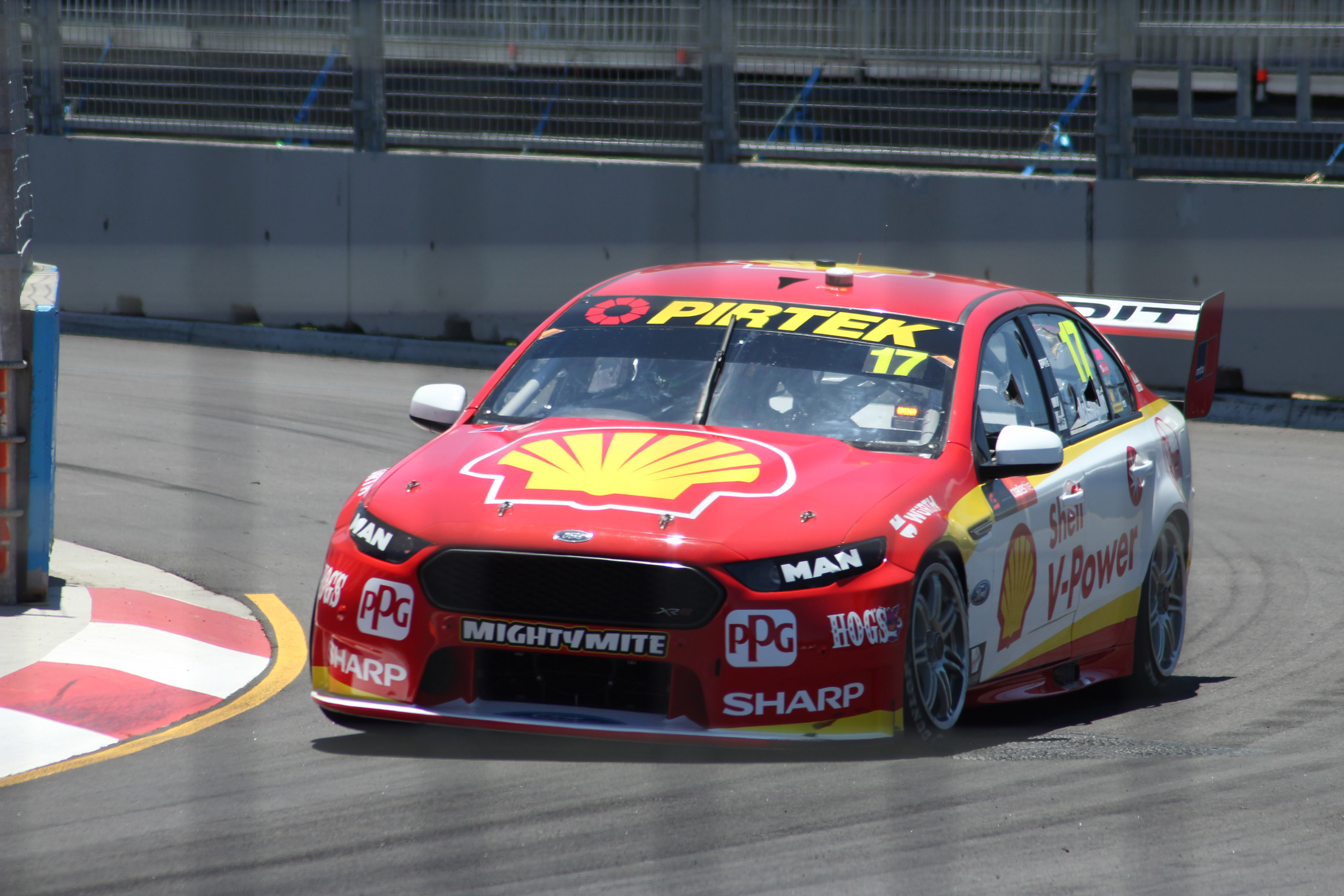
Scott McLaughlin won the opening race of the 2017 event driving a Ford Falcon FG X

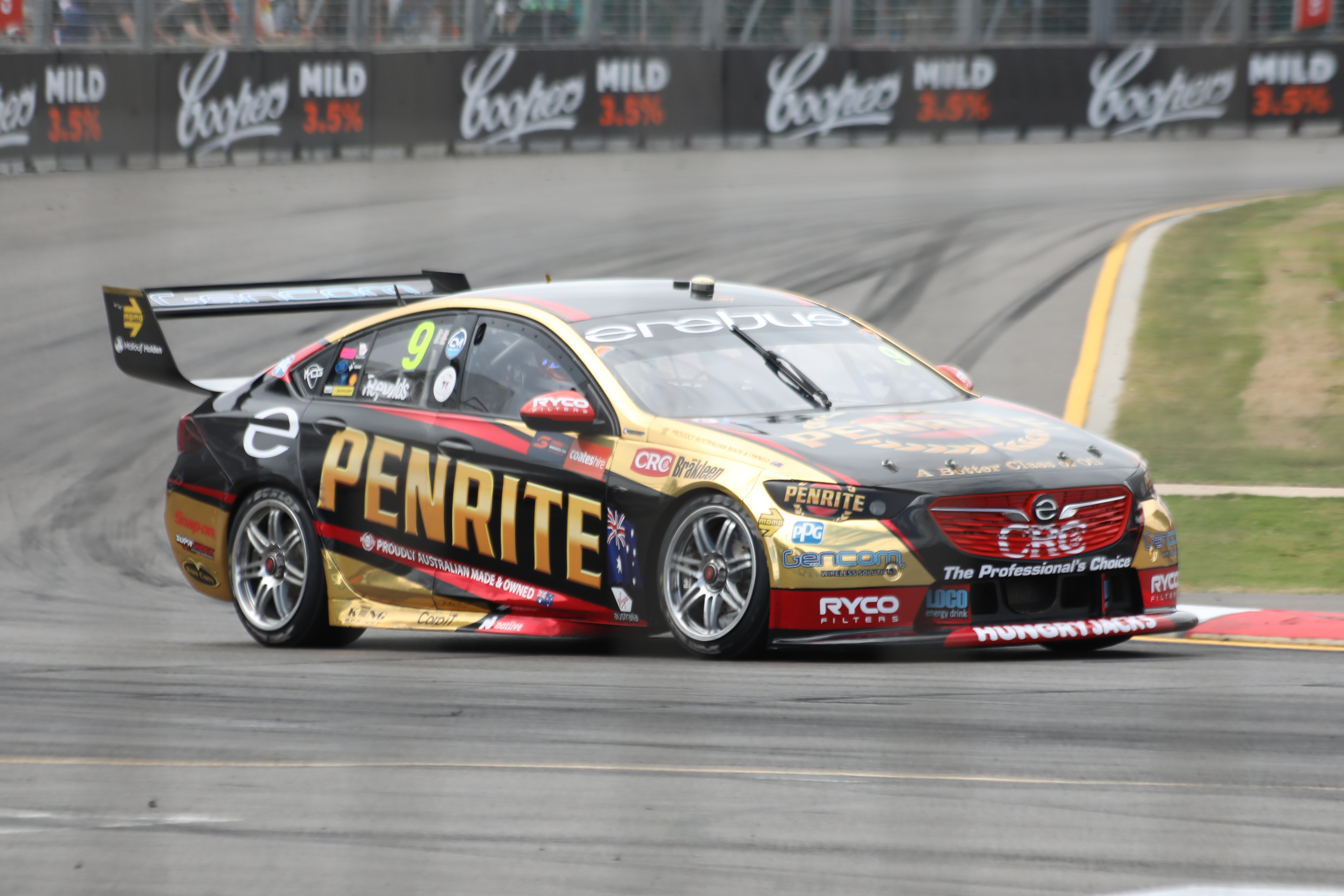
David Reynolds (pictured in 2018) scored the most points in the 2017 and 2018 events.

Year	Event title	Race	Driver	Team	Car
2017	Coates Hire Newcastle 500	1	(New Zealand) Scott McLaughlin	DJR Team Penske	Ford Falcon FG X
2017	Coates Hire Newcastle 500	2	(Australia) Jamie Whincup	Triple Eight Race Engineering	Holden Commodore VF
2018	Coates Hire Newcastle 500	1	(New Zealand) Scott McLaughlin^{1}	DJR Team Penske	Ford Falcon FG X
2018	Coates Hire Newcastle 500	2	(Australia) David Reynolds	Erebus Motorsport	Holden Commodore ZB
2019	Coates Hire Newcastle 500	1	(New Zealand) Shane van Gisbergen	Triple Eight Race Engineering	Holden Commodore ZB
2019	Coates Hire Newcastle 500	2	(Australia) Jamie Whincup	Triple Eight Race Engineering	Holden Commodore ZB
2020 – 2022	not held due to the COVID-19 pandemic				
2023	Thrifty Newcastle 500	1	(Australia) Cameron Waters^{1}	Tickford Racing	Ford Mustang S650
2023	Thrifty Newcastle 500	2	(New Zealand) Shane van Gisbergen	Triple Eight Race Engineering	Chevrolet Camaro Mk.6

- ^{1} – Driver awarded victory after post-race penalties and disqualifications.

== Multiple winners ==
=== By driver ===
Race Wins	Driver
2	(New Zealand) Scott McLaughlin
2	(Australia) Jamie Whincup
2	(New Zealand) Shane van Gisbergen

=== By team ===
Race Wins	Team
4	Triple Eight Race Engineering
2	DJR Team Penske

=== By manufacturer ===
Race Wins	Manufacturer
4	Holden
3	Ford

== Criticism ==
Before the first running of the event, many local residents raised concerns about the implications of the event's running in this area of the city. Up to 140 residents staged a protest resulting in clashes against Supercars fans, among concerns about noise restrictions and lack of access during the race weekend. During the inaugural race weekend, NSW Police were called to a trackside unit following reports that a support category was egged.

== Concerts ==
The Newcastle 500 event and circuit precinct has and will play host to various music acts as part of the "Rock and Race" format. In 2017 the concerts were held in Foreshore Park within the confines of the circuit, while from 2018 onwards concerts have been scheduled to be held at Newcastle Number 1 Sports Ground, 3.5 km away. Bands and band tours to have been conducted in tandem with the event include:

- 2017: Delta Goodrem, The Veronicas, Cold Chisel, Spiderbait, The Owls
- 2018: Simple Minds, Birds of Tokyo, The Delta Riggs

In 2019, Kiss were scheduled to headline a concert including The Screaming Jets as part of their End of the Road World Tour before it was cancelled along with the other Australian and New Zealand tour dates.

== Event sponsors ==
- 2017–19: Coates Hire
- 2023: Thrifty

== See also ==
- List of Australian Touring Car Championship races
