= 2018 Supercars Championship =

Motor racing competition

Scott McLaughlin (pictured in 2013) won his first Supercars Championship.

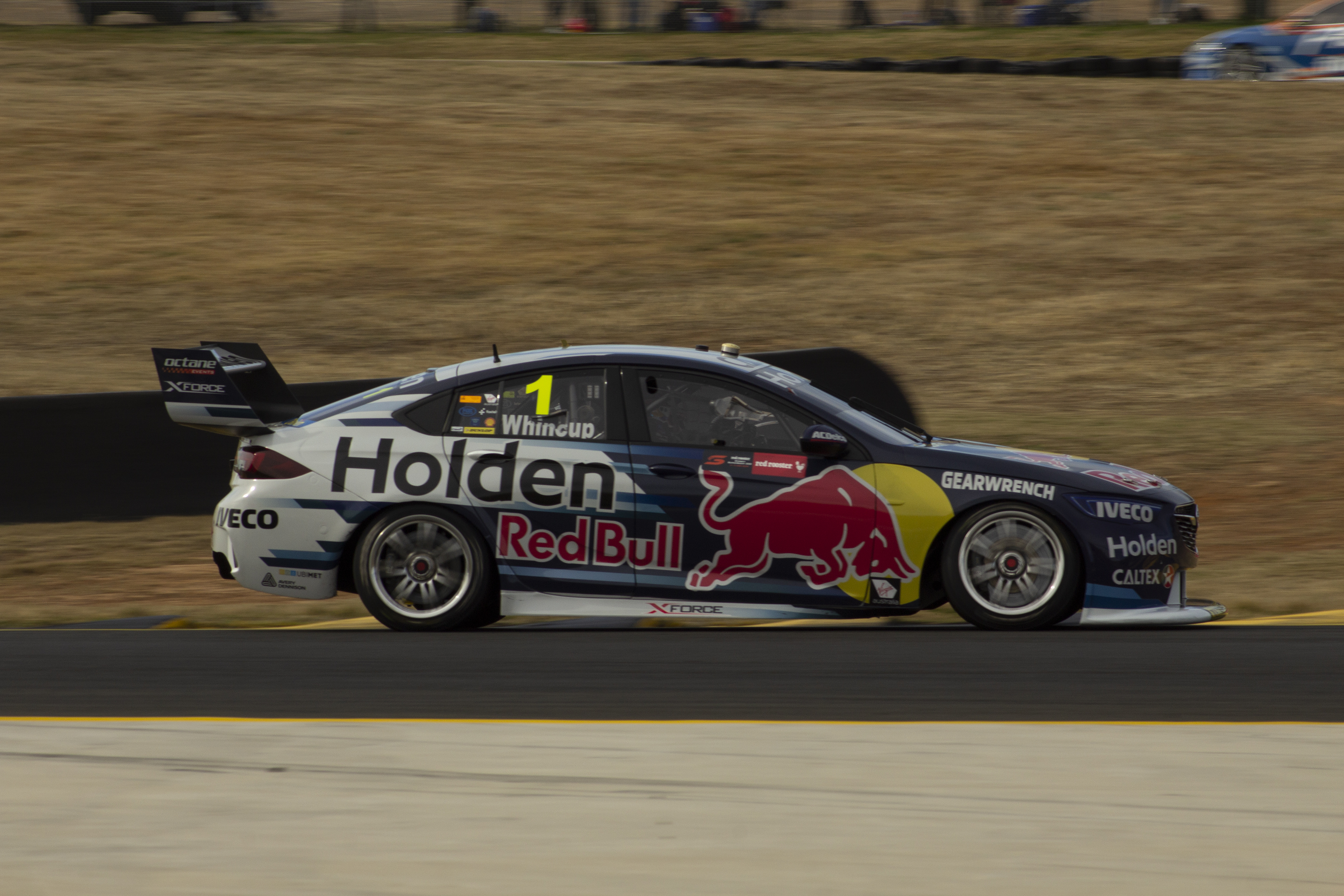
Triple Eight Race Engineering won the teams' championship with one event to go.

The 2018 Supercars Championship (known for commercial reasons as the 2018 Virgin Australia Supercars Championship) was an FIA-sanctioned international motor racing series for Supercars. It was the twentieth running of the Supercars Championship and the twenty-second series in which Supercars have contested the premier Australian touring car title. Teams and drivers competed in thirty-one races at sixteen venues across Australia and New Zealand for the championship titles. Scott McLaughlin won his maiden title at the final race in Newcastle, while Triple Eight Race Engineering won the Teams Championship at Pukekohe.

The 2018 season saw the introduction of the first Gen 2 Supercars, which opened up the category up to a wider variety of body shapes and engine configurations. The championship saw the introduction of the hatchback Holden ZB Commodore, marking the first time since 1994 that a car with a body shape other than a four-door sedan has competed.

== Teams and drivers ==
Holden and Nissan were represented by factory-backed teams Triple Eight Race Engineering and Nissan Motorsport respectively. Teams were free to develop new chassis and engine packages under the Gen 2 regulations, while the New Generation cars first introduced in 2013 remained eligible to compete.

The following teams and drivers competed in the 2018 championship.

Championship entries						Enduro Cup entries	
Manufacturer	Model	Team	No.	Driver name	Rounds	Co-driver name	Rounds
Ford	Falcon FG X	Tickford Racing	5	(Australia) Mark Winterbottom	All	(Australia) Dean Canto	12–14
Ford	Falcon FG X	Tickford Racing	6	(Australia) Cam Waters	All	(Australia) David Russell	12–14
Ford	Falcon FG X	Tickford Racing	55	(Australia) Chaz Mostert	All	(Australia) James Moffat	12–14
Ford	Falcon FG X	Tickford Racing	56	(New Zealand) Richie Stanaway	All	(Australia) Steve Owen	12–14
Ford	Falcon FG X	DJR Team Penske	12	(New Zealand) Fabian Coulthard	All	(Australia) Tony D'Alberto	12–14
Ford	Falcon FG X	DJR Team Penske	17	(New Zealand) Scott McLaughlin	All	(France) Alexandre Prémat	12–14
Ford	Falcon FG X	23Red Racing	230	(Australia) Will Davison	All	(Australia) Alex Davison	12–14
Ford	Falcon FG X	Matt Stone Racing	35	(Australia) Todd Hazelwood	1–10	—N/a	
Holden	Commodore ZB	Triple Eight Race Engineering	1	(Australia) Jamie Whincup	All	(Australia) Paul Dumbrell	12–14
Holden	Commodore ZB	Triple Eight Race Engineering	97	(New Zealand) Shane van Gisbergen	All	(New Zealand) Earl Bamber	12–14
Holden	Commodore ZB	Triple Eight Race Engineering	888	(Australia) Craig Lowndes	All	(New Zealand) Steven Richards	12–14
Holden	Commodore ZB	Walkinshaw Andretti United	2	(Australia) Scott Pye	All	(Australia) Warren Luff	12–14
Holden	Commodore ZB	Walkinshaw Andretti United	25	(Australia) James Courtney	All	(Australia) Jack Perkins	12–14
Holden	Commodore ZB	Brad Jones Racing	8	(Australia) Nick Percat	All	(Australia) Macauley Jones	12–14
Holden	Commodore ZB	Brad Jones Racing	14	(Australia) Tim Slade	All	(Australia) Ashley Walsh	12–14
Holden	Commodore ZB	Tim Blanchard Racing (BJR)	21	(Australia) Tim Blanchard	All	(Australia) Dale Wood	12–14
Holden	Commodore ZB	Erebus Motorsport	9	(Australia) David Reynolds	All	(Australia) Luke Youlden	12–14
Holden	Commodore ZB	Erebus Motorsport	99	(Australia) Anton de Pasquale	All	(Australia) Will Brown	12–14
Holden	Commodore ZB	Team 18	18	(Australia) Lee Holdsworth	All	(Australia) Jason Bright	12–14
Holden	Commodore ZB	Tekno Autosports	19	(Australia) Jack Le Brocq	All	(Australia) Jonathon Webb	12–14
Holden	Commodore ZB	Garry Rogers Motorsport	33	(Australia) Garth Tander	All	(New Zealand) Chris Pither	12–14
Holden	Commodore ZB	Garry Rogers Motorsport	34	(Australia) James Golding	All	(Australia) Richard Muscat	12–14
Holden	Commodore VF	Matt Stone Racing	35	(Australia) Todd Hazelwood	11–16	(Australia) Bryce Fullwood	12–14
Nissan	Altima L33	Nissan Motorsport	7	(New Zealand) Andre Heimgartner	All	(Australia) Aaren Russell	12–14
Nissan	Altima L33	Nissan Motorsport	15	(Australia) Rick Kelly	All	(Australia) Garry Jacobson	12–14
Nissan	Altima L33	Nissan Motorsport	23	(Australia) Michael Caruso	All	(Australia) Dean Fiore	12–14
Nissan	Altima L33	Nissan Motorsport	78	(Switzerland) Simona de Silvestro	All	(Australia) Alex Rullo	12–14
Wildcard entries
Holden	Commodore ZB	Brad Jones Racing	4	(Australia) Macauley Jones	7, 11	—N/a	
Holden	Commodore VF	Kostecki Brothers Racing	42	(Australia) Kurt Kostecki	9, 11	—N/a	
Source:						Source:	

=== Team changes ===
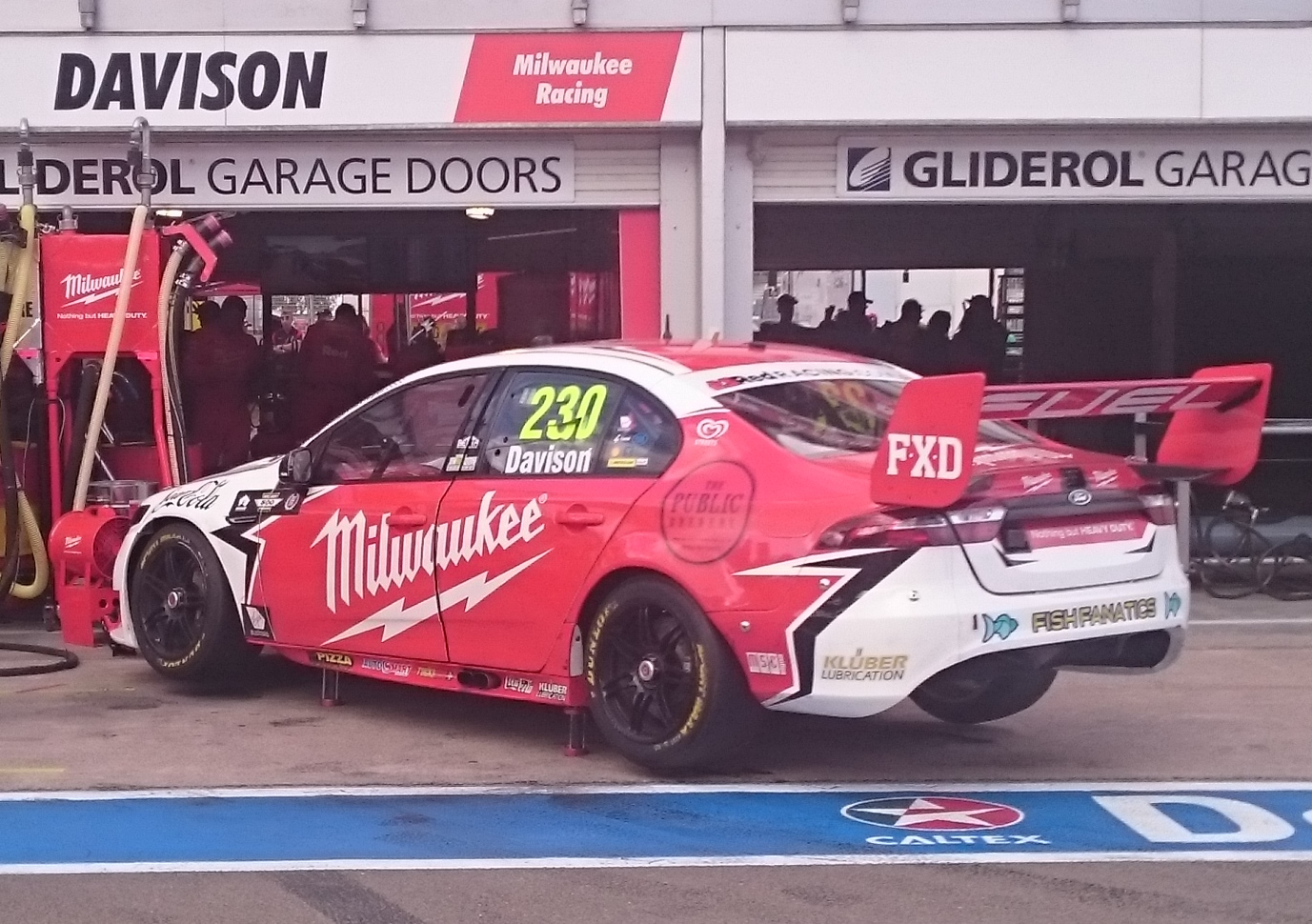
23Red Racing was a new name in the championship for 2018, fielding a Ford Falcon FG X for Will Davison

The Holden ZB Commodore was homologated, making it eligible to compete in the championship. All existing Holden teams commenced the season with the new car, either new chassis or reskinned VF Commodores. Triple Eight Race Engineering, who oversaw the development and homologation of the ZB chassis were also developing a V6 twin-turbocharged engine for Holden cars ahead of a full introduction in 2019. However, the programme was put on indefinite hold in April 2018. Triple Eight team were proposing to debut the V6 powerplant with a number of wildcard entries, however the discontinuation of the project resulted in this being scrapped.

Britek Motorsport left the championship, with its Racing Entitlements Contract (REC) leased to Super2 Series team Matt Stone Racing who made their championship début entering an FG X Falcon built by DJR Team Penske. The team switched to competing with a VF Commodore mid-season.

Lucas Dumbrell Motorsport sold one of its RECs to Prodrive Racing Australia. The team was rebranded as 23Red Racing after sponsor Phil Munday purchased a 60% stake in the team in the off-season, before taking full ownership in April 2018. The team competed with a Prodrive-built FG X Falcon.

Prodrive Racing Australia became Tickford Racing after its lease on the Prodrive name expired, while Walkinshaw Racing was rebranded as Walkinshaw Andretti United when Andretti Autosport and United Autosports purchased stakes in the team.

=== Driver changes ===
Super2 Series drivers Todd Hazelwood and Anton de Pasquale made their Supercars début. Hazelwood joined Matt Stone Racing—the team he won the 2017 Super2 title with—while De Pasquale replaced Dale Wood at Erebus Motorsport. Wood was one of three drivers to leave the championship, as both Todd Kelly and Jason Bright retired from competition.

Andre Heimgartner returned to the championship, replacing the retiring Kelly at Nissan Motorsport, while Richie Stanaway replaced Bright at Tickford Racing.

Will Davison moved from Tekno Autosports to the newly-formed 23Red Racing team. Davison's place at Tekno Autosports was filled by Super2 Series driver Jack Le Brocq.

James Moffat left Garry Rogers Motorsport at the end of the 2017 championship and joined Tickford Racing for the Enduro Cup. Moffat's place at Garry Rogers Motorsport was taken by James Golding, who drove for the team in the Enduro Cup in 2016 and 2017.

=== Wildcard entries ===
Two wildcard entries were confirmed for 2018, with Brad Jones Racing running Macauley Jones at Winton and The Bend, and Kostecki Brothers Racing running Kurt Kostecki at Ipswich and The Bend.

== Calendar ==

The calendar was expanded to sixteen events in 2018, with the following events taking place:

Event	Event name	Circuit	Location	Dates
1	Adelaide 500	(South Australia) Adelaide Street Circuit	Adelaide, South Australia	3–4 March
2	Melbourne 400	(Victoria (state)) Albert Park Circuit	Albert Park, Victoria	23–25 March
3	Tasmania SuperSprint	(Tasmania) Symmons Plains Raceway	Launceston, Tasmania	7–8 April
4	Phillip Island 500	(Victoria (state)) Phillip Island Grand Prix Circuit	Phillip Island, Victoria	21–22 April
5	Perth SuperSprint	(Western Australia) Barbagallo Raceway	Neerabup, Western Australia	5–6 May
6	Winton SuperSprint	(Victoria (state)) Winton Motor Raceway	Benalla, Victoria	19–20 May
7	Darwin Triple Crown	(Northern Territory) Hidden Valley Raceway	Darwin, Northern Territory	16–17 June
8	Townsville 400	(Queensland) Reid Park Street Circuit	Townsville, Queensland	7–8 July
9	Ipswich SuperSprint	Queensland Raceway	Ipswich, Queensland	21–22 July
10	Sydney SuperNight 300	(New South Wales) Sydney Motorsport Park	Eastern Creek, New South Wales	4 August
11	The Bend SuperSprint	(South Australia) The Bend Motorsport Park	Tailem Bend, South Australia	25–26 August
12	Sandown 500	(Victoria (state)) Sandown Raceway	Springvale, Victoria	16 September
13	Bathurst 1000	(New South Wales) Mount Panorama Circuit	Bathurst, New South Wales	7 October
14	Gold Coast 600	(Queensland) Surfers Paradise Street Circuit	Surfers Paradise, Queensland	20–21 October
15	Auckland SuperSprint	(New Zealand) Pukekohe Park Raceway	Pukekohe, Auckland Region	3–4 November
16	Newcastle 500	(New South Wales) Newcastle Street Circuit	Newcastle, New South Wales	24–25 November

=== Calendar changes ===
The Melbourne Grand Prix Circuit, which hosted the Supercars Challenge non-championship event between 1996 and 2017, (Note: The Supercars Challenge was not held in 2007.) joined the calendar as a championship event for the first time. The event, which was named the Melbourne 400, continued to be run as part of the support bill for the Australian Grand Prix.

The Bend Motorsport Park in Tailem Bend, South Australia, the first permanent circuit to be built in Australia since Queensland Raceway in 1999, hosted an event of the championship. The Bend SuperSprint ran on the 4.9 km "International" configuration of the circuit.

=== Format changes ===
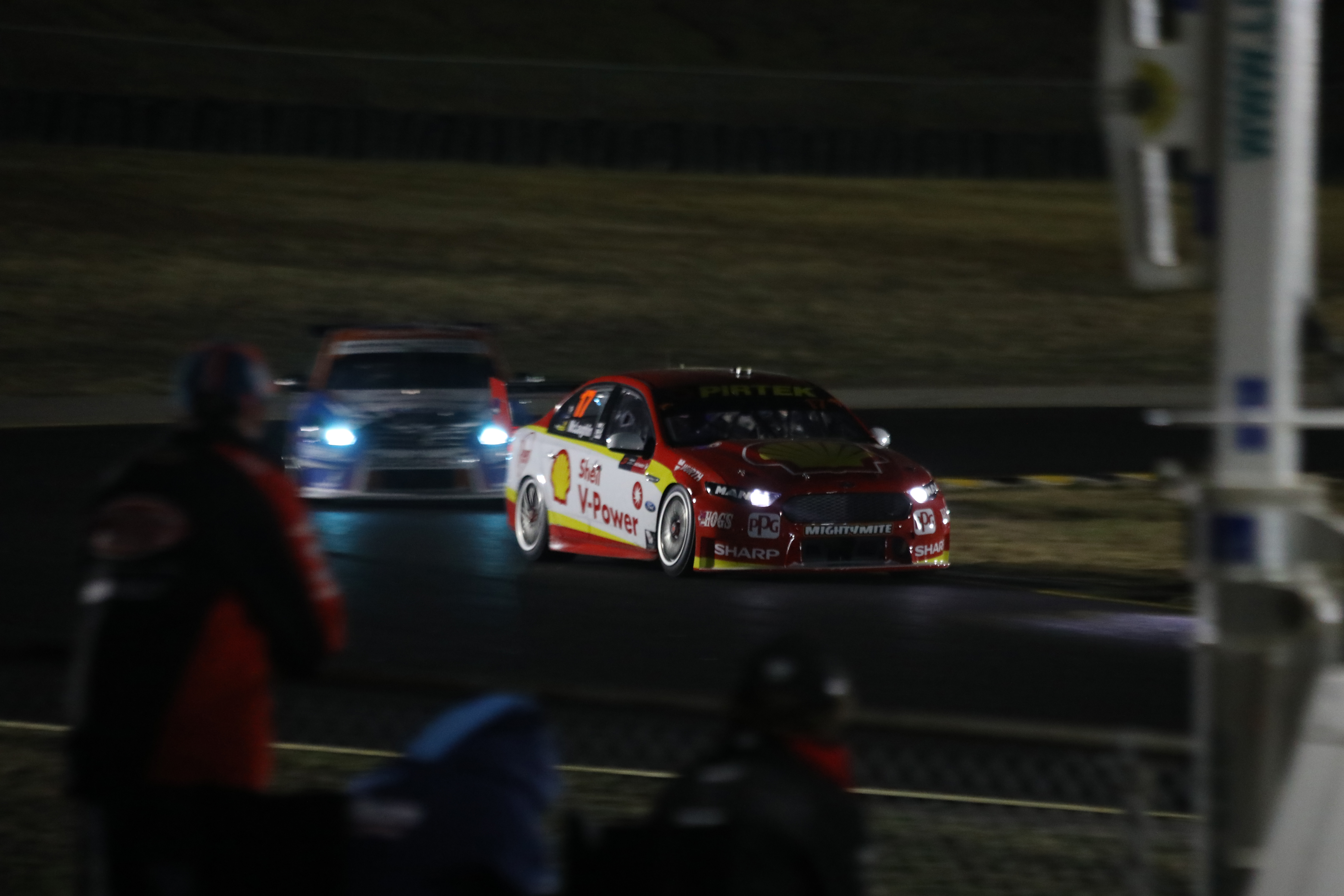
The Sydney Motorsport Park event featured a single race held at night.

The Melbourne 400 event featured four races. All four were longer than the races that were run as part of the Australian Grand Prix support event in previous years, before it was granted championship status. Two of the races were run at twilight and included mandatory pit stops, while the other two were shorter sprint races run in daylight hours.

Sydney Motorsport Park hosted the Sydney SuperNight 300, which consisted of a single 300 km race held under lights. It was the first night race since the Yas Marina Circuit in Abu Dhabi hosted the opening event of the 2011 season. The event consisted of two 30 minute practice sessions and a 20-minute qualifying session ahead of a 300 km race. The race included three compulsory pit stops.

The Auckland SuperSprint included a Top 10 Shootout for the Sunday race. A Top 10 Shootout was added to the first race of the Gold Coast 600 after the Confederation of Australian Motor Sport suspended the licence of the Stadium Super Trucks support category on safety grounds, removing the category from the Supercars' support bill.

== Rule changes ==
A new qualifying format was introduced for the Symmons Plains, Barbagallo and Sydney Motorsport Park events. The system uses three stages similar to the system used in Formula One and was introduced as a response to the shorter layouts of the Symmons Plains and Barbagallo circuits which drew criticism about congestion as drivers on flying laps would encounter slow-moving cars preparing to start their own laps. The system was later added to the Sydney SuperNight 300 after proving popular during its trials at the Symmons Plains and Barbagallo events.

The "wildcard" programme introduced in 2017, which allowed teams from the Dunlop Super2 Series to compete in the Supercars Championship, continued in 2018. Entries were open for the Winton, Hidden Valley, Ipswich and Tailem Bend events, while the Barbagallo event was discontinued after the 2017 edition failed to attract wildcard entries. The Bathurst 1000 was open to wildcard entries, but was separate to the wildcard programme for Super2 teams. No entries were received for the latter.

The Confederation of Australian Motor Sport (CAMS) adjusted the eligibility requirements of the licensing system used by the championship. The revised requirements were designed to make it easier for Super2 drivers to qualify for a racing licence.

== Results and standings ==
=== Season summary ===
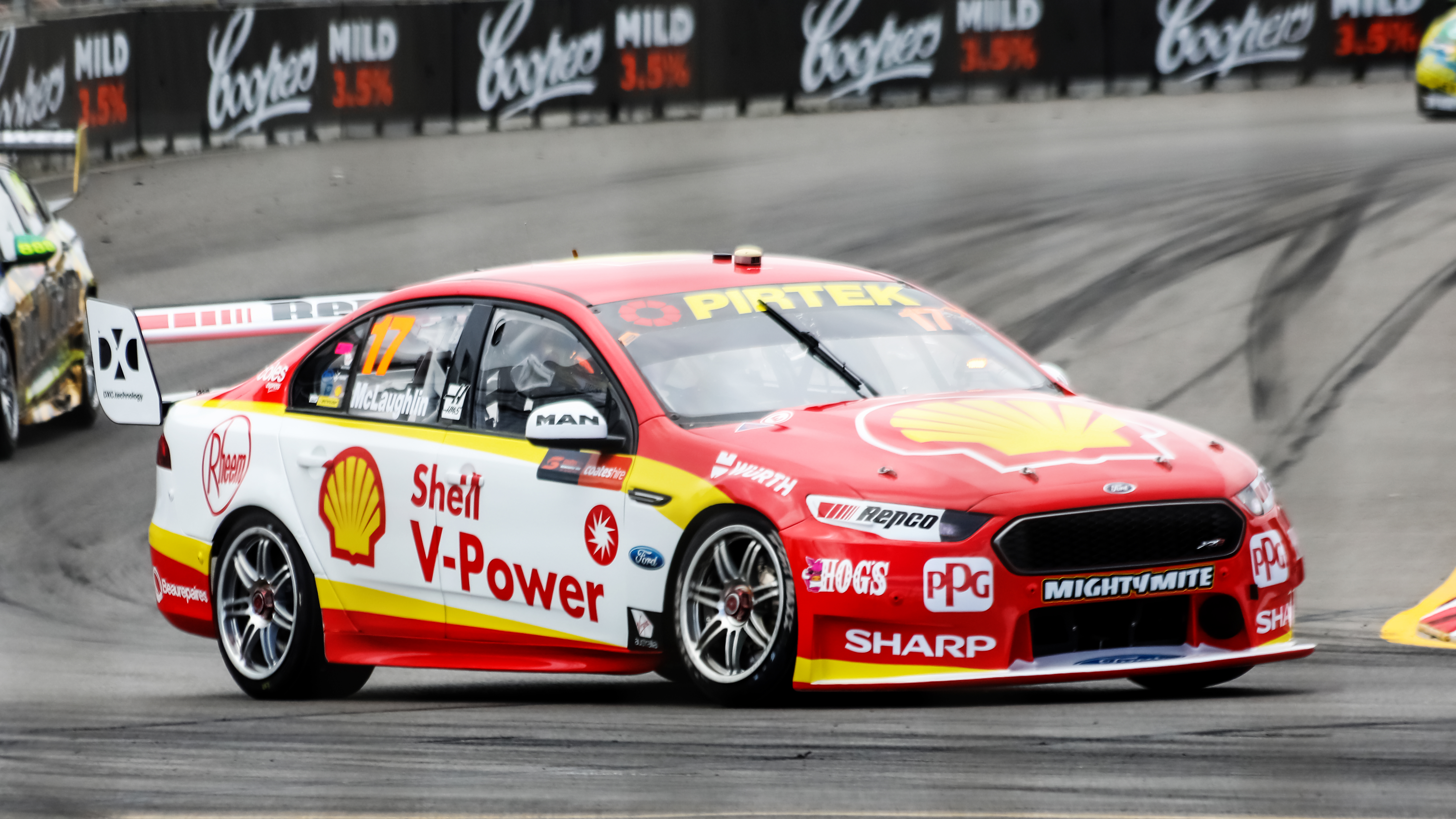
Scott McLaughlin driving a Ford FG X Falcon won Race 30 and placed second in Race 31 at the final event, securing the Drivers Championship title.

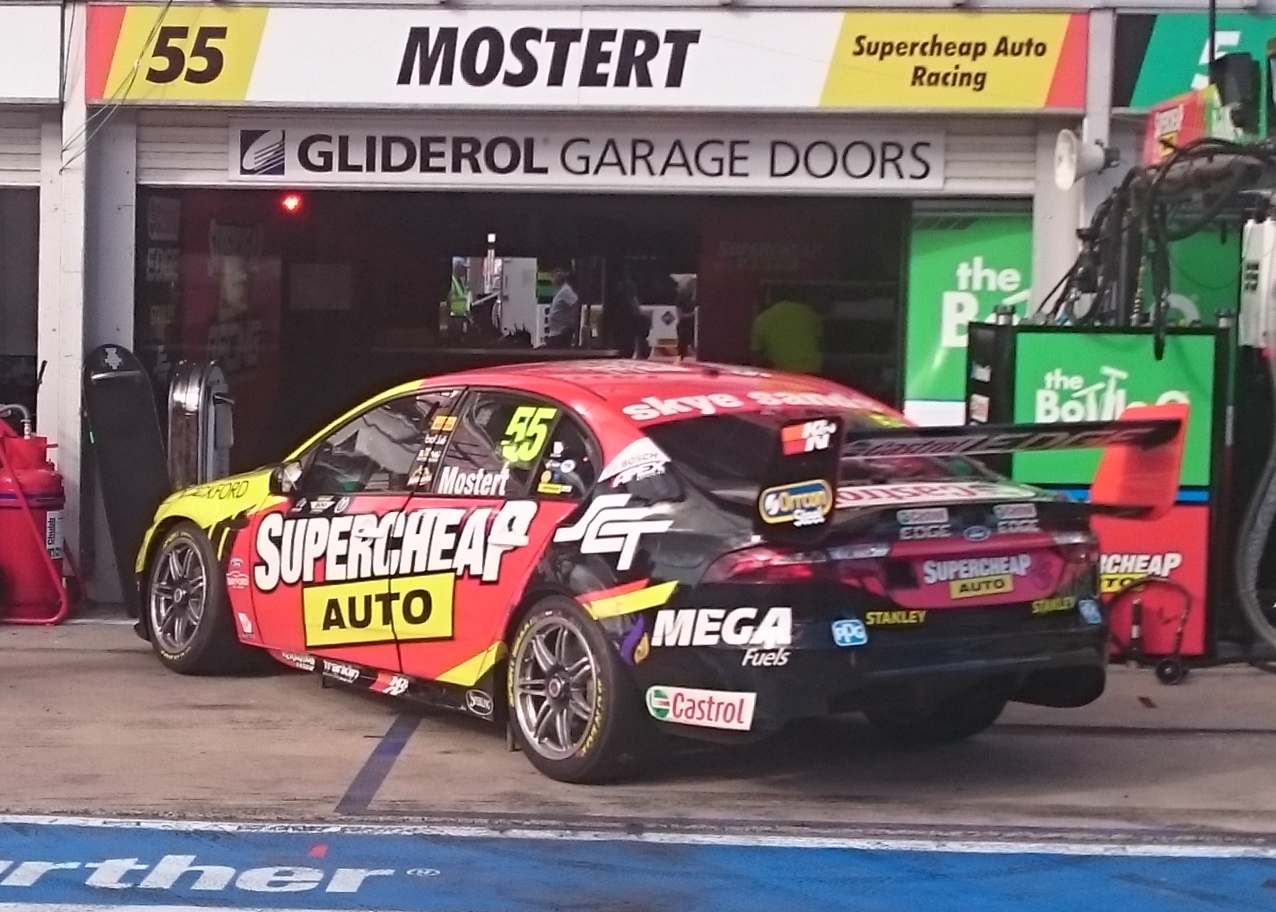
Chaz Mostert placed sixth driving a Ford Falcon FG X for Tickford Racing

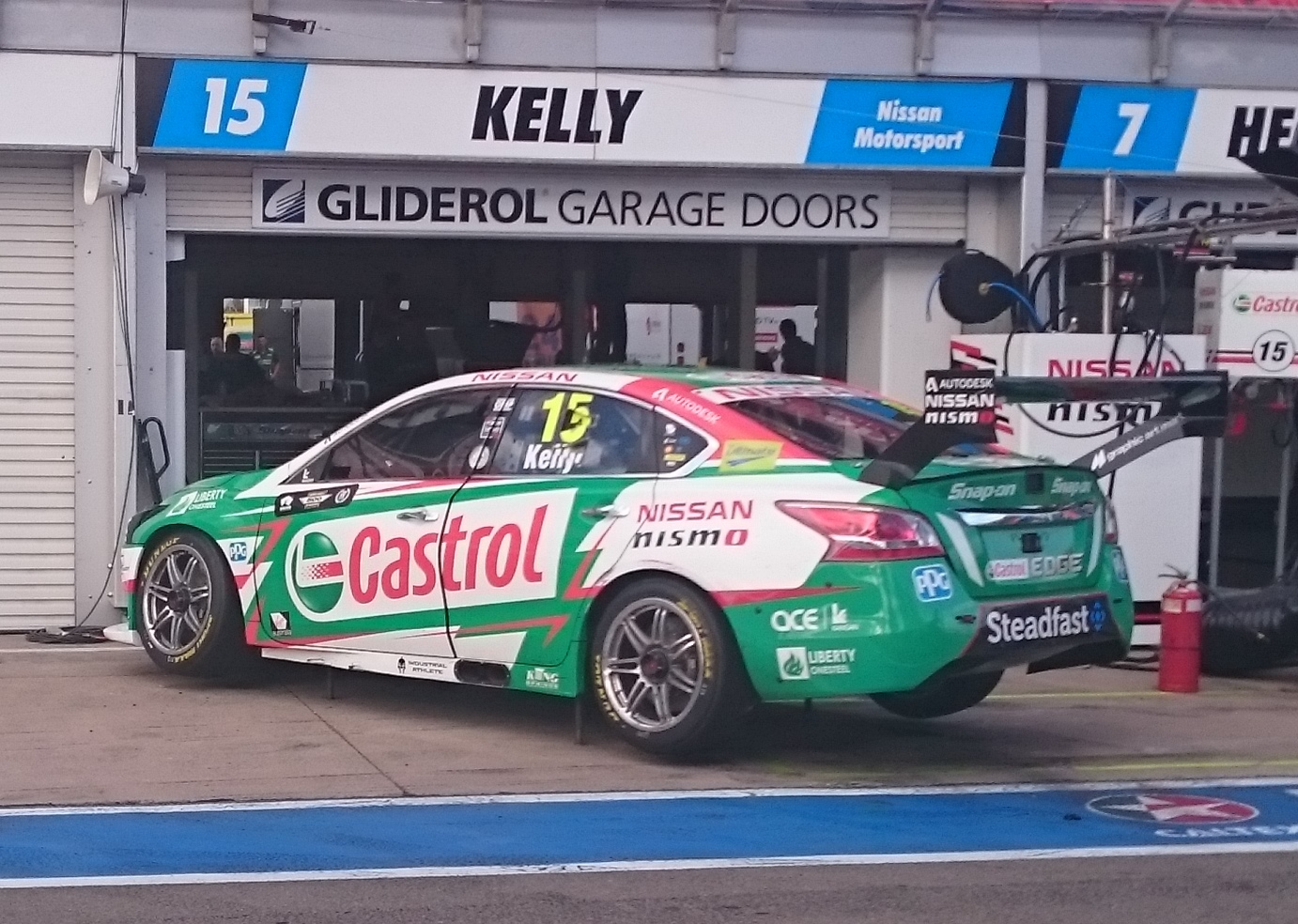
Rick Kelly placed eighth driving a Nissan Altima for Nissan Motorsport

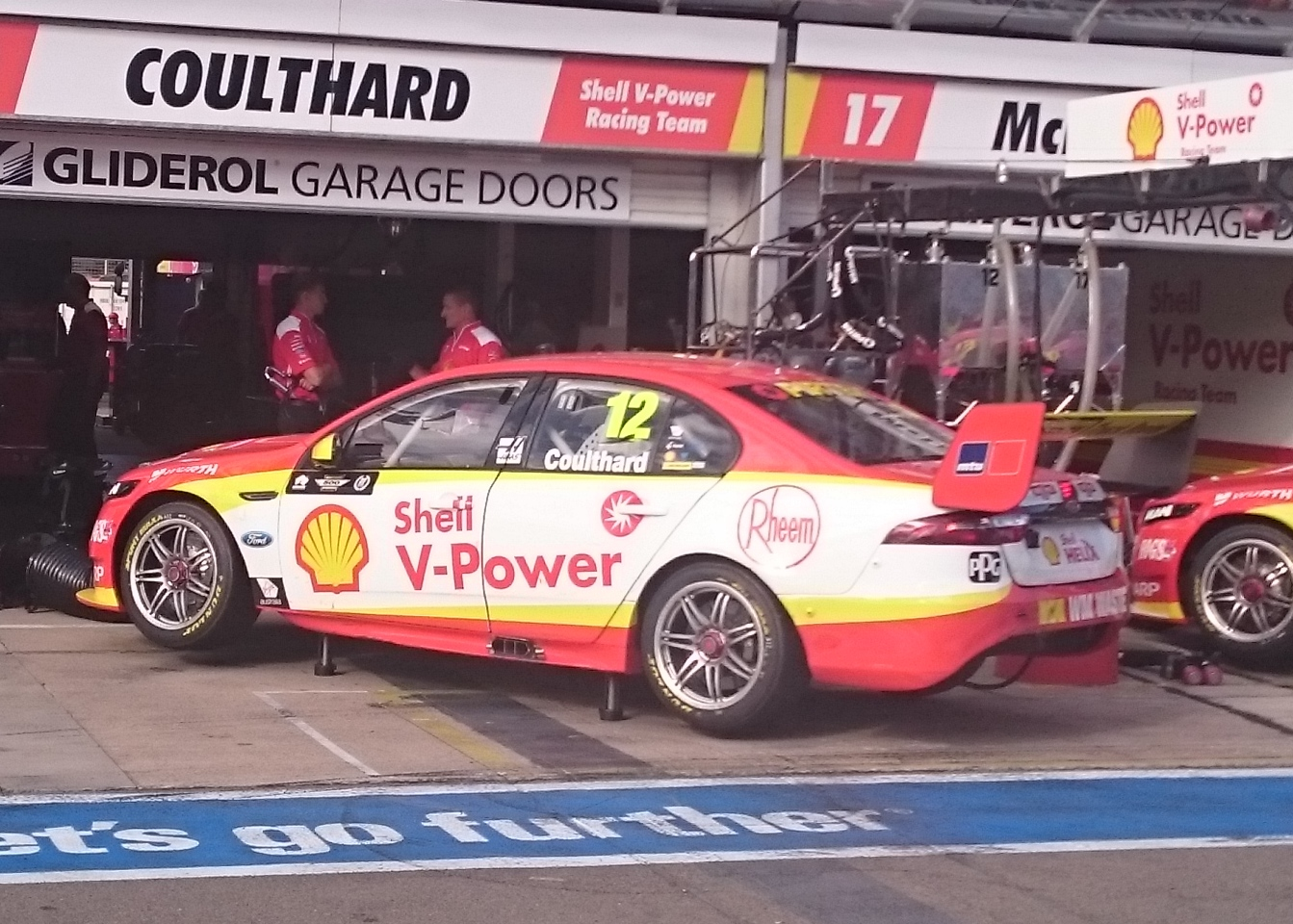
Fabian Coulthard placed ninth driving a Ford Falcon FG X for DJR Team Penske

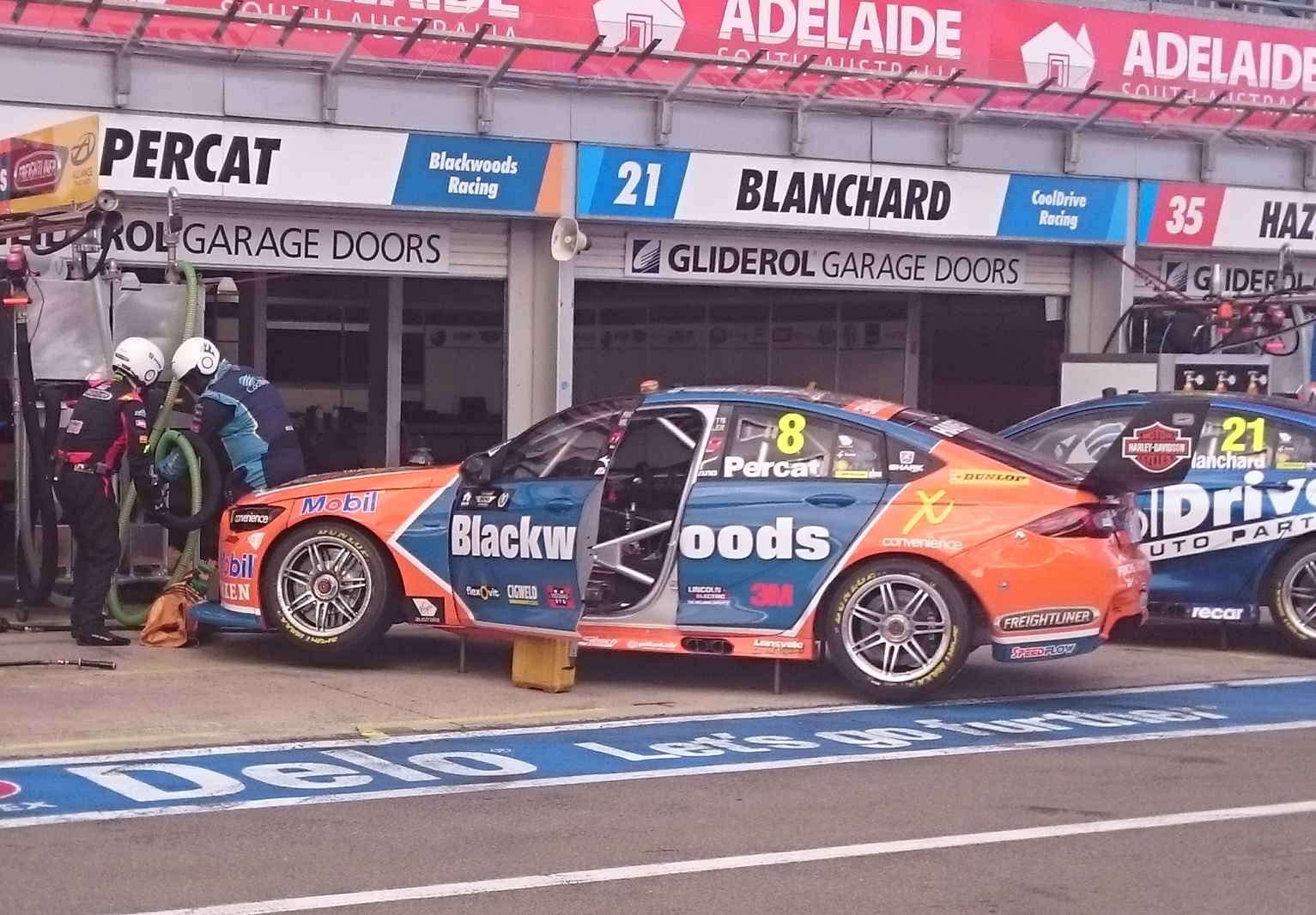
Nick Percat placed 10th driving a Holden Commodore ZB for Brad Jones Racing

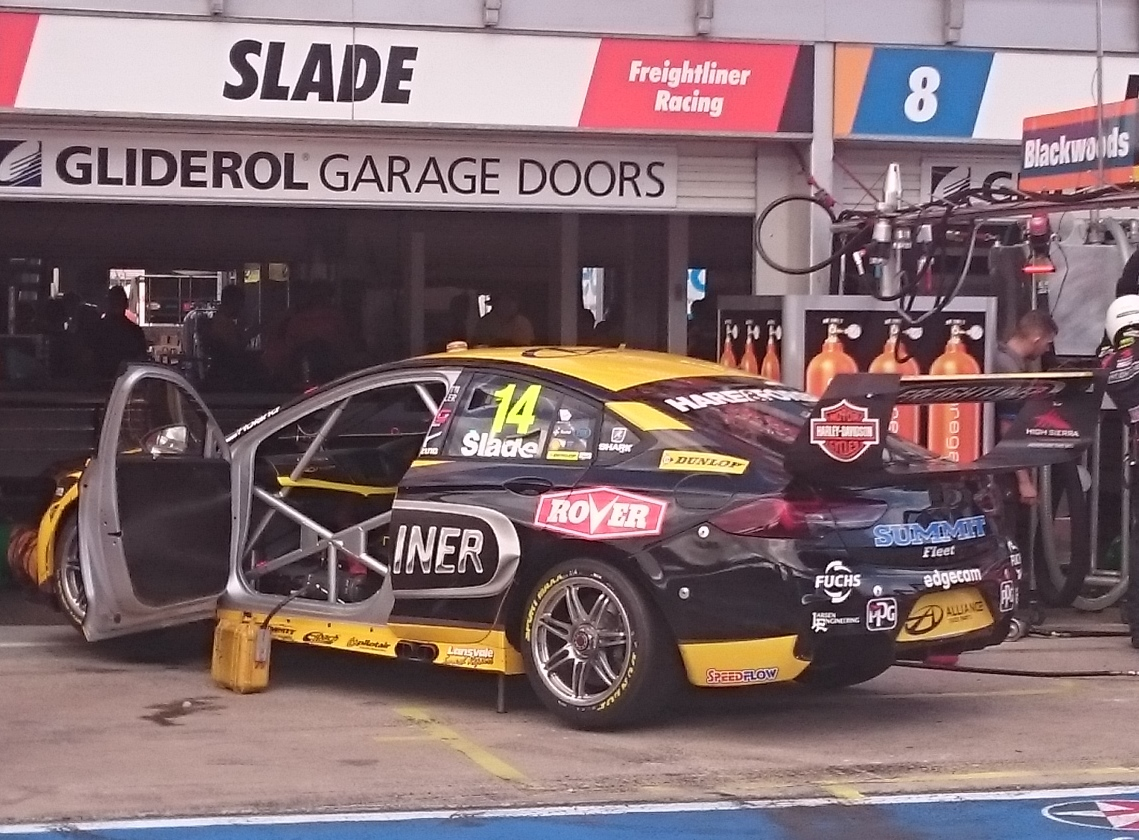
Tim Slade placed 11th driving a Holden Commodore ZB for Brad Jones Racing

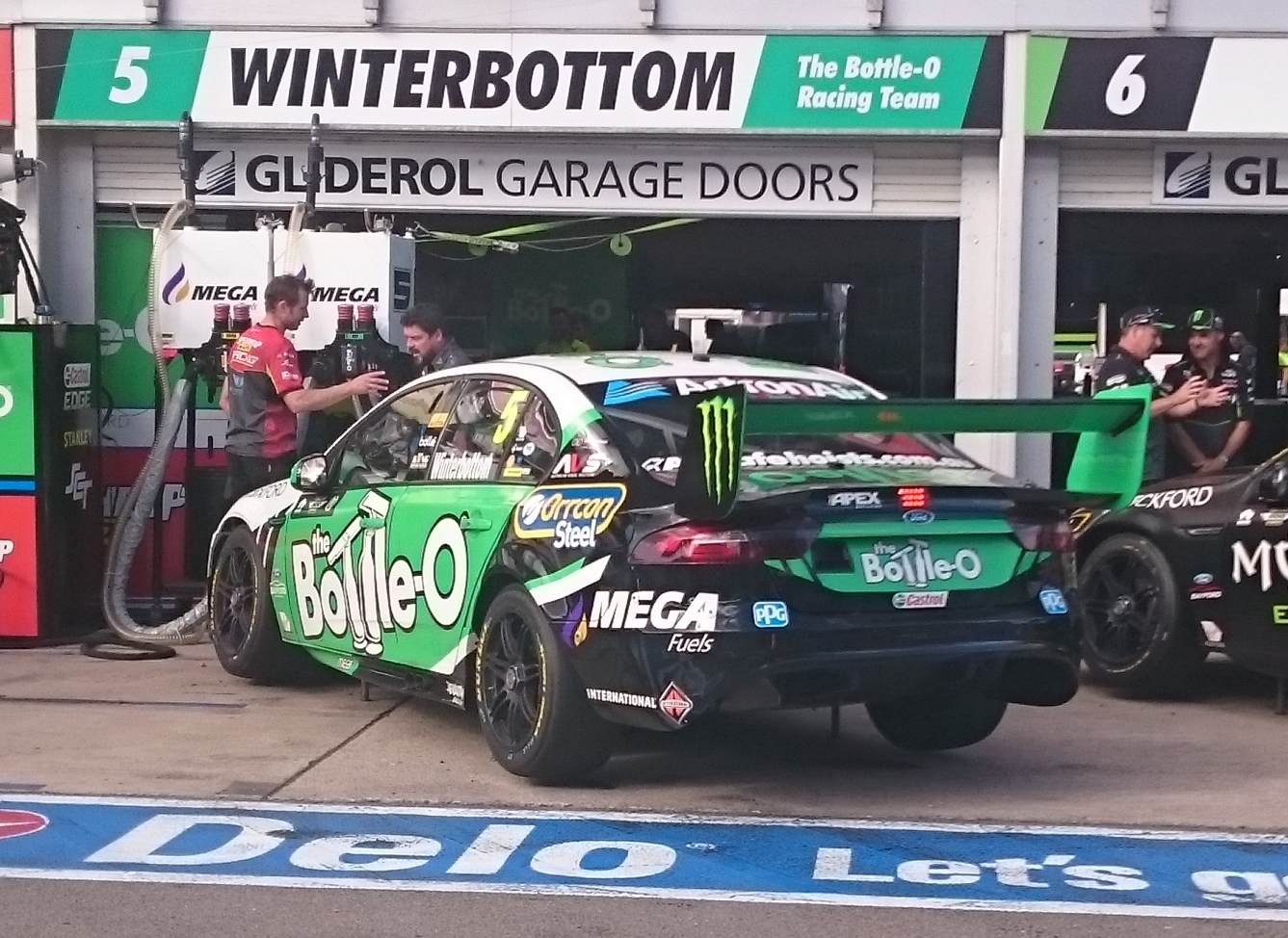
Mark Winterbottom placed 12th driving a Ford Falcon FG X for Tickford Racing

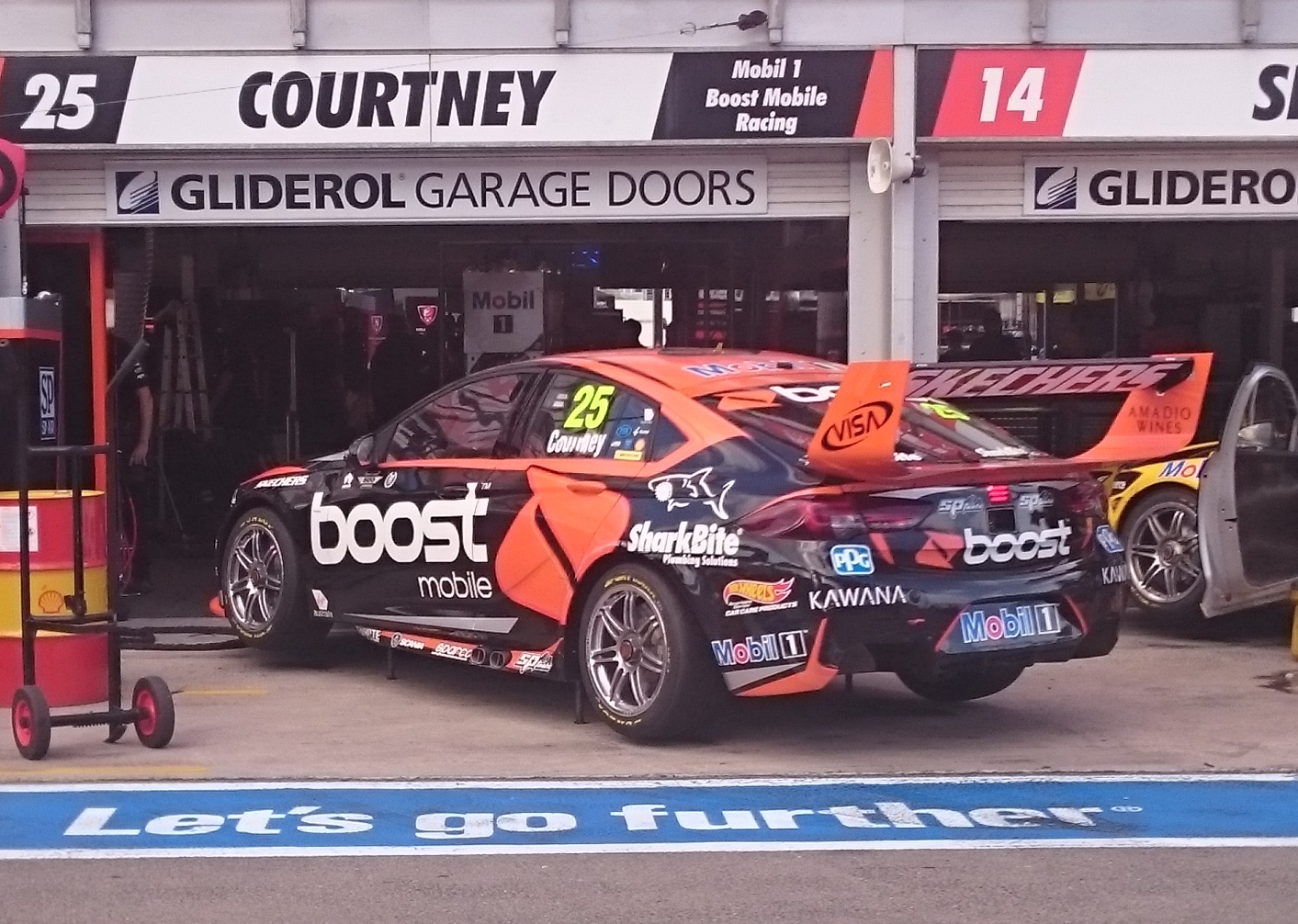
James Courtney placed 14th driving a Holden Commodore ZB for Walkinshaw Andretti United

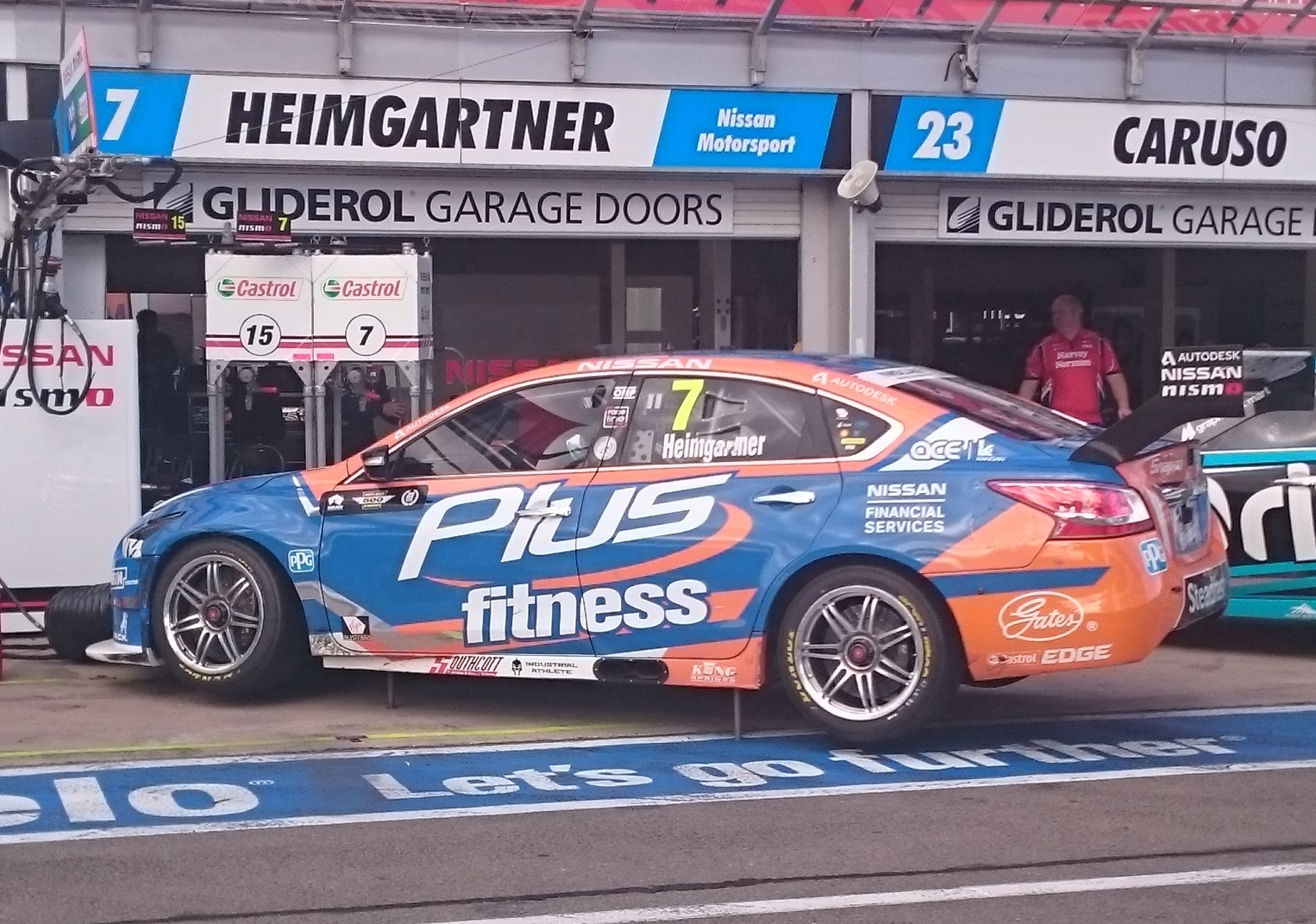
Andre Heimgartner placed 17th driving a Nissan Altima for Nissan Motorsport

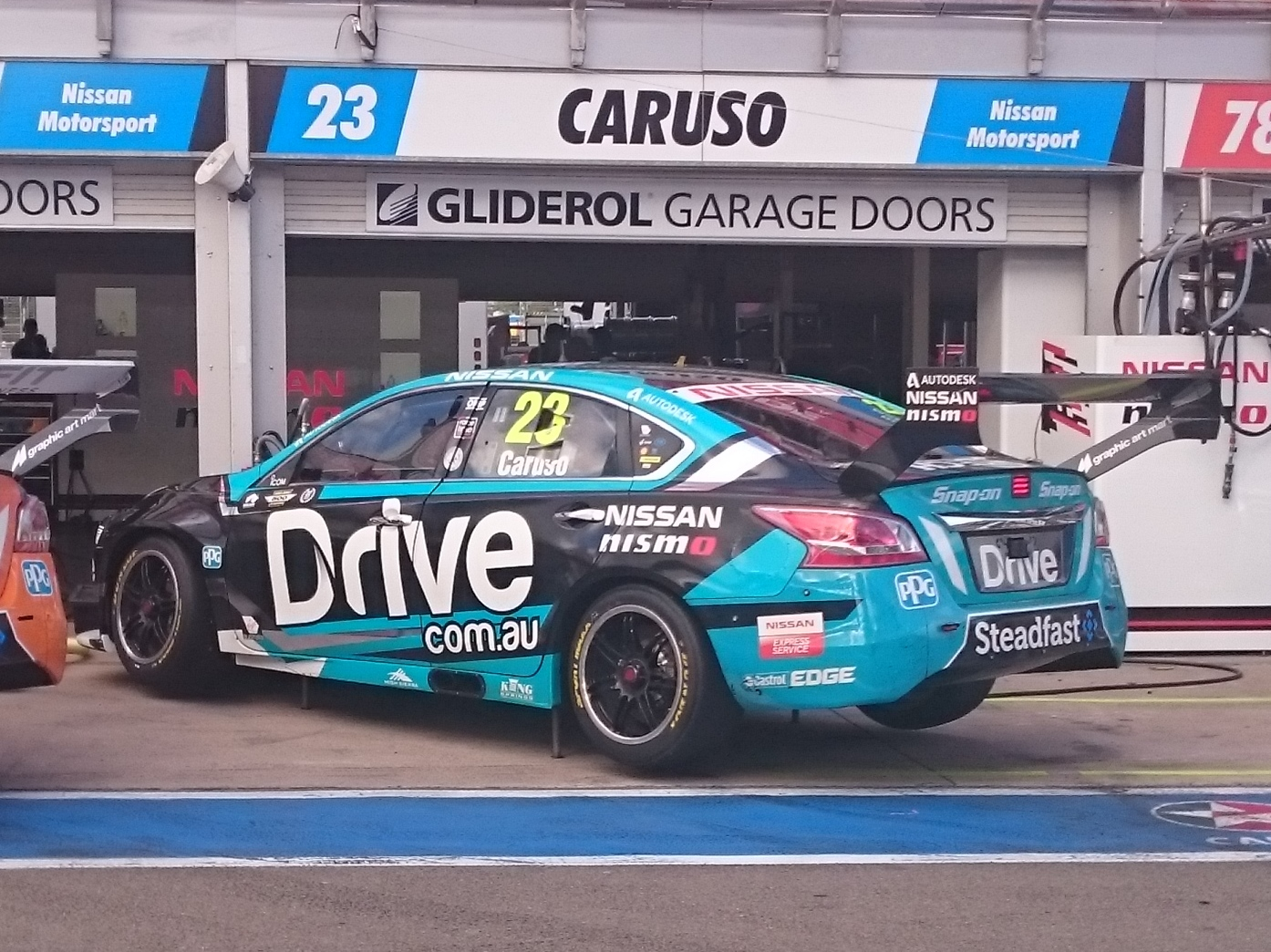
Michael Caruso placed 18th driving a Nissan Altima for Nissan Motorsport

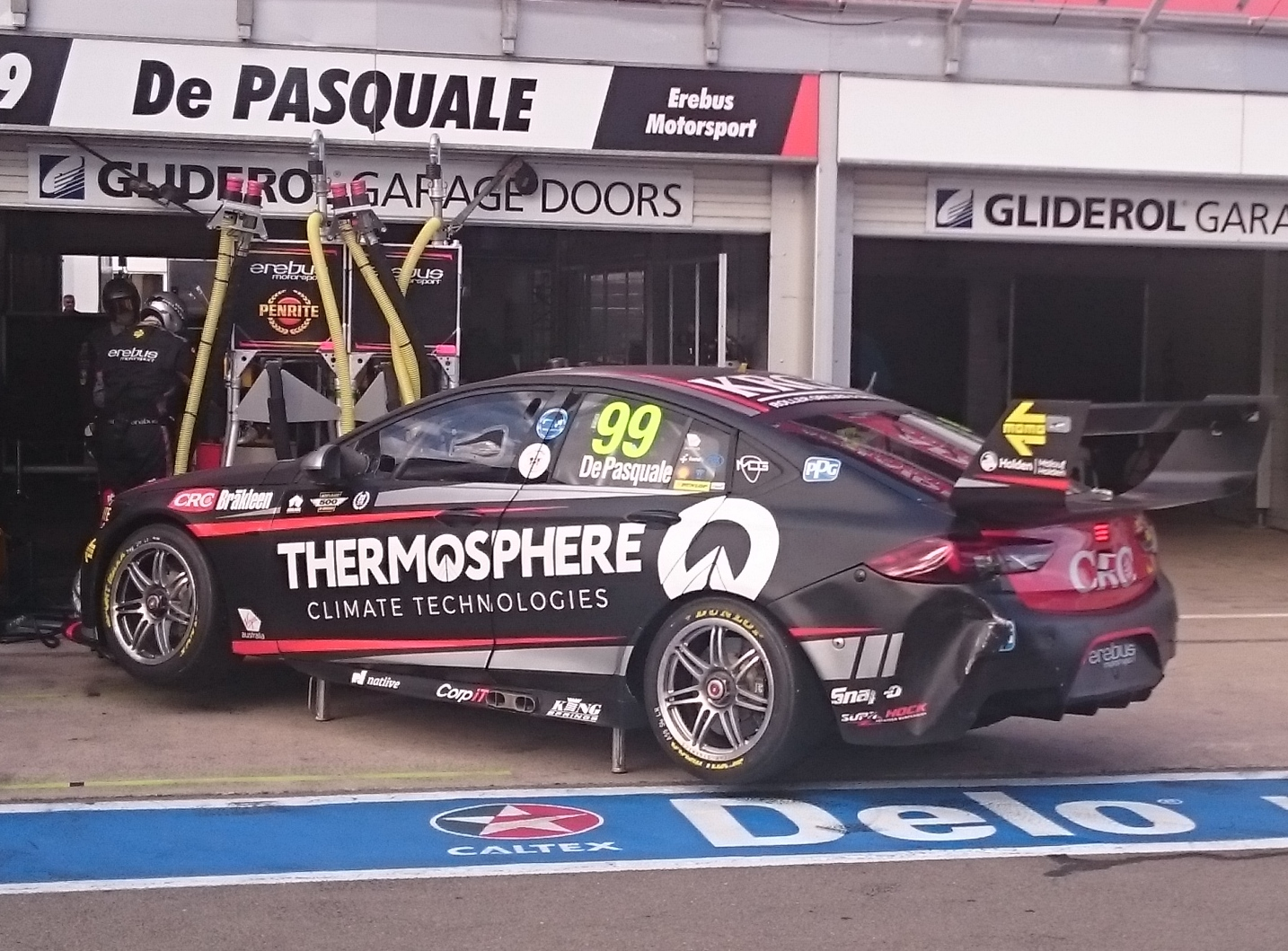
Anton de Pasquale placed 20th driving a Holden Commodore ZB for Erebus Motorsport

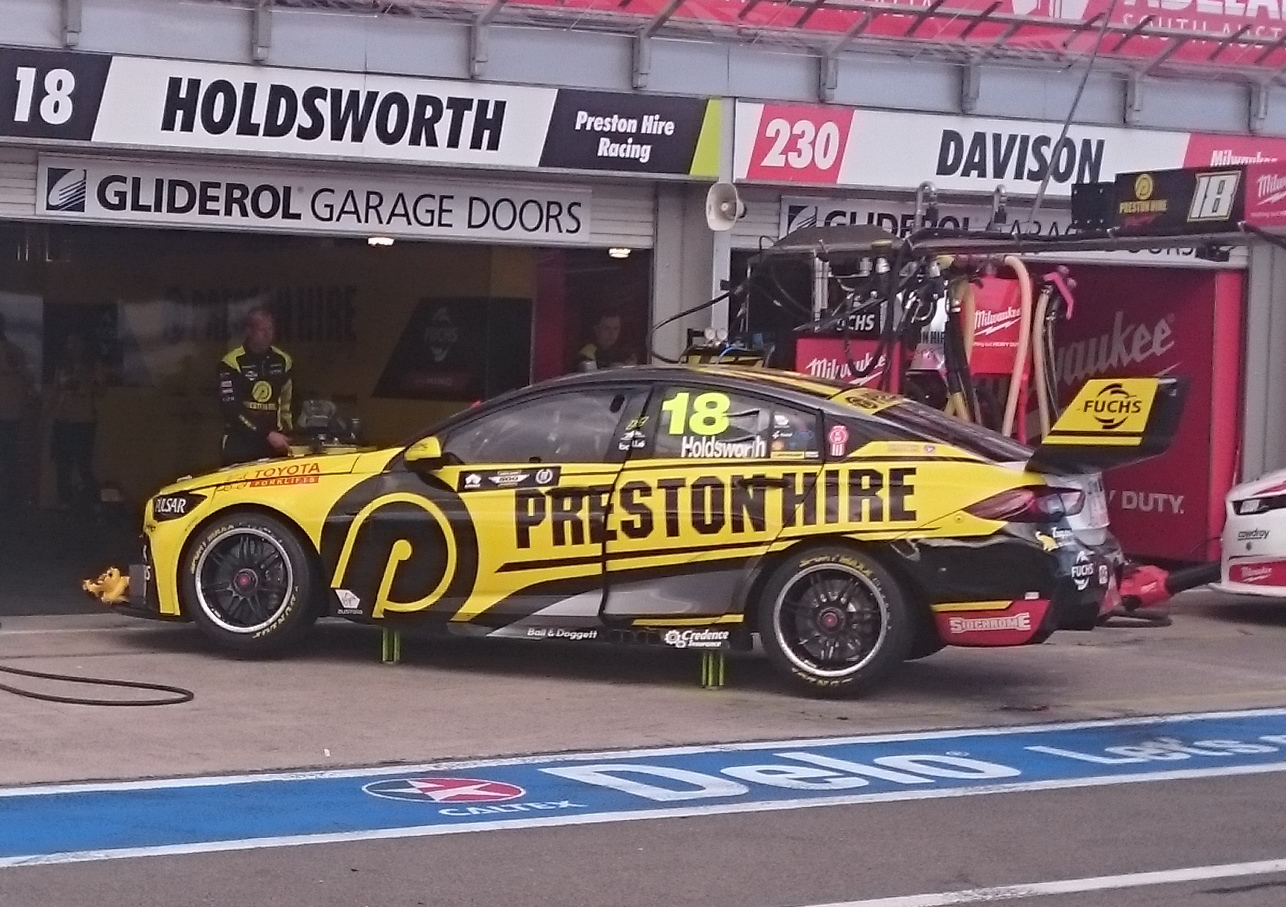
Lee Holdsworth placed 21st in the championship driving a Holden Commodore ZB for Team 18

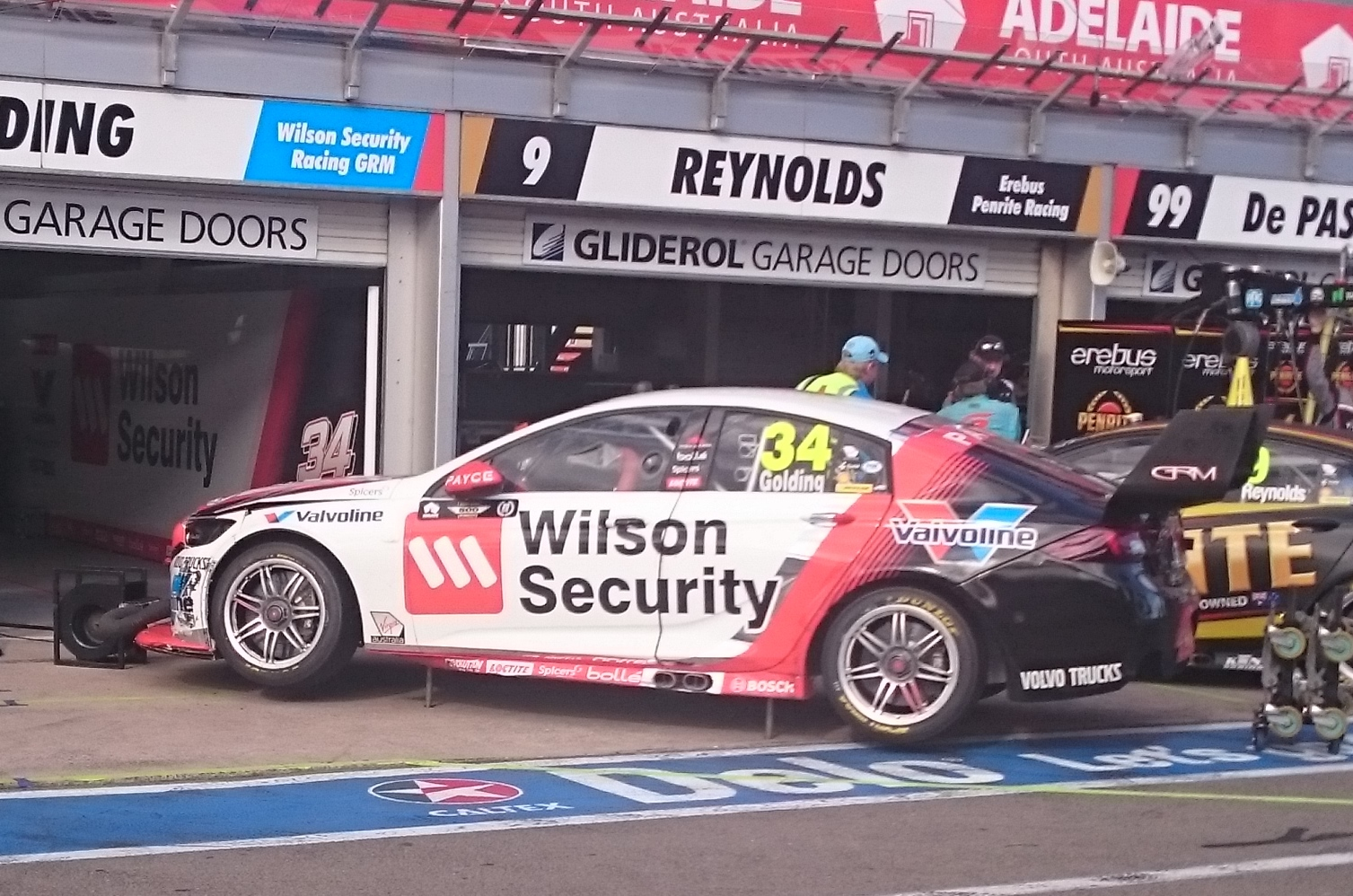
James Golding placed 22nd in the championship driving a Holden Commodore ZB for Garry Rogers Motorsport

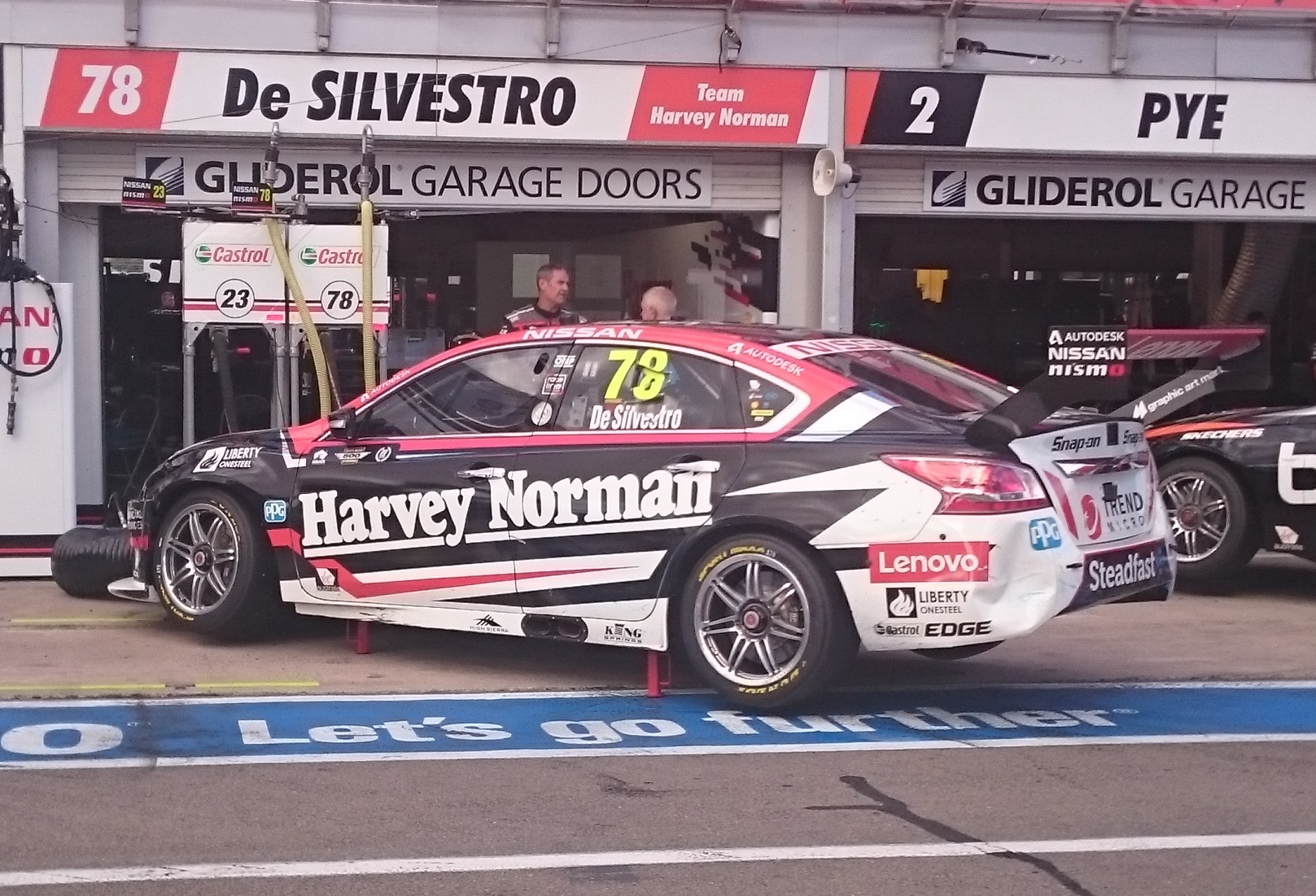
Simona De Silvestro placed 23rd in the championship driving a Nissan Altima for Team Harvey Norman

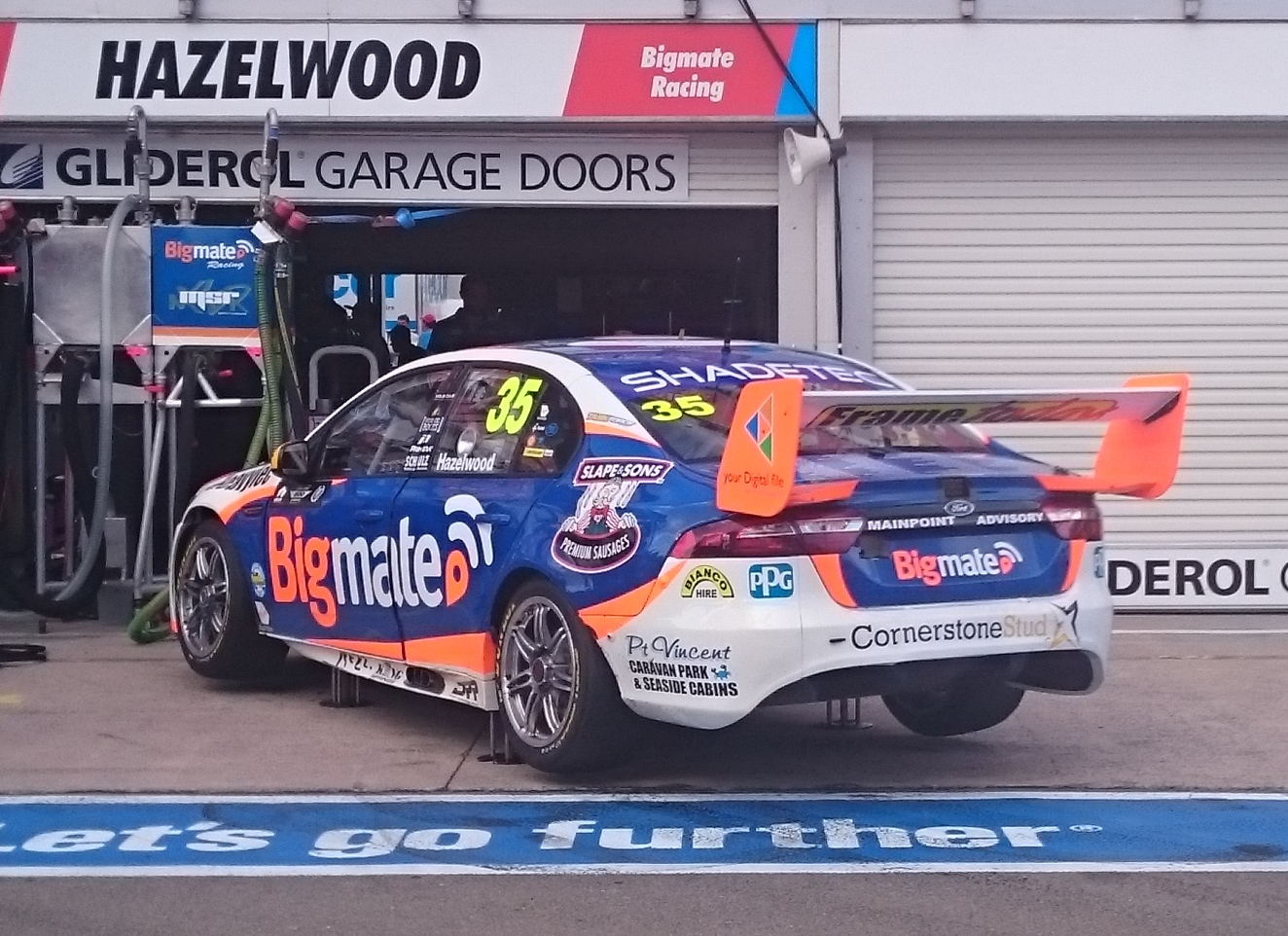
Todd Hazelwood placed 26th in the championship driving a Ford Falcon FG X (pictured) and a Holden Commodore VF for Matt Stone Racing

Round	Race	Event	Pole position	Fastest lap	Winning driver	Winning team	Report
1	1	Adelaide 500	(New Zealand) Shane van Gisbergen	(Australia) Jamie Whincup	(New Zealand) Shane van Gisbergen	Triple Eight Race Engineering	Report
1	2	Adelaide 500	(New Zealand) Shane van Gisbergen	(Australia) Jamie Whincup	(New Zealand) Shane van Gisbergen	Triple Eight Race Engineering	Report
2	3	Melbourne 400	(New Zealand) Scott McLaughlin	(Australia) Tim Slade	(New Zealand) Scott McLaughlin	DJR Team Penske	Report
2	4	Melbourne 400	(Australia) Jamie Whincup	(Australia) Jamie Whincup	(Australia) Jamie Whincup	Triple Eight Race Engineering	Report
2	5	Melbourne 400	(New Zealand) Scott McLaughlin	(Australia) James Courtney	(Australia) Scott Pye	Walkinshaw Andretti United	Report
2	6	Melbourne 400	(Australia) Jamie Whincup	(Australia) Nick Percat	(Australia) David Reynolds	Erebus Motorsport	Report
3	7	Tasmania SuperSprint	(New Zealand) Shane van Gisbergen	(Australia) Scott Pye	(Australia) Jamie Whincup	Triple Eight Race Engineering	Report
3	8	Tasmania SuperSprint	(Australia) Craig Lowndes	(Australia) James Courtney	(Australia) Craig Lowndes	Triple Eight Race Engineering	Report
4	9	Phillip Island 500	(New Zealand) Scott McLaughlin	(New Zealand) Scott McLaughlin	(New Zealand) Scott McLaughlin	DJR Team Penske	Report
4	10	Phillip Island 500	(New Zealand) Scott McLaughlin	(New Zealand) Scott McLaughlin	(New Zealand) Scott McLaughlin	DJR Team Penske	Report
5	11	Perth SuperSprint	(New Zealand) Scott McLaughlin	(Australia) James Courtney	(New Zealand) Scott McLaughlin	DJR Team Penske	Report
5	12	Perth SuperSprint	(New Zealand) Shane van Gisbergen	(Australia) Tim Slade	(New Zealand) Scott McLaughlin	DJR Team Penske	Report
6	13	Winton SuperSprint	(New Zealand) Scott McLaughlin	(New Zealand) Shane van Gisbergen	(Australia) Rick Kelly	Nissan Motorsport	Report
6	14	Winton SuperSprint	(New Zealand) Scott McLaughlin	(New Zealand) Scott McLaughlin	(New Zealand) Fabian Coulthard	DJR Team Penske	Report
7	15	Darwin Triple Crown	(Australia) David Reynolds	(Australia) Will Davison	(New Zealand) Scott McLaughlin	DJR Team Penske	Report
7	16	Darwin Triple Crown	(Australia) Rick Kelly	(Australia) Nick Percat	(Australia) David Reynolds	Erebus Motorsport	Report
8	17	Townsville 400	(New Zealand) Scott McLaughlin	(Australia) Chaz Mostert	(Australia) Jamie Whincup	Triple Eight Race Engineering	Report
8	18	Townsville 400	(New Zealand) Shane van Gisbergen	(New Zealand) Scott McLaughlin	(New Zealand) Shane van Gisbergen	Triple Eight Race Engineering	Report
9	19	Ipswich SuperSprint	(New Zealand) Scott McLaughlin	(Australia) James Courtney	(New Zealand) Scott McLaughlin	DJR Team Penske	Report
9	20	Ipswich SuperSprint	(New Zealand) Scott McLaughlin	(Australia) Tim Slade	(New Zealand) Shane van Gisbergen	Triple Eight Race Engineering	Report
10	21	Sydney SuperNight 300	(New Zealand) Scott McLaughlin	(Australia) Jamie Whincup	(New Zealand) Shane van Gisbergen	Triple Eight Race Engineering	Report
11	22	The Bend SuperSprint	(Australia) Jamie Whincup	(New Zealand) Shane van Gisbergen	(New Zealand) Shane van Gisbergen	Triple Eight Race Engineering	Report
11	23	The Bend SuperSprint	(Australia) Jamie Whincup	(Australia) Jamie Whincup	(Australia) Jamie Whincup	Triple Eight Race Engineering	Report
12	24	Sandown 500	(Australia) David Reynolds (Australia) Luke Youlden	(Australia) Jamie Whincup	(Australia) Jamie Whincup (Australia) Paul Dumbrell	Triple Eight Race Engineering	Report
13	25	Bathurst 1000	(Australia) David Reynolds	(Australia) David Reynolds	(Australia) Craig Lowndes (New Zealand) Steven Richards	Triple Eight Race Engineering	Report
14	26	Gold Coast 600	(New Zealand) Scott McLaughlin	(Australia) Jamie Whincup	(Australia) Chaz Mostert (Australia) James Moffat	Tickford Racing	Report
14	27	Gold Coast 600	(Australia) David Reynolds	race abandoned (Note: Race 27 was suspended due to torrential rain and could not be re-started. As less than 50% of the race distance had been completed when the race was abandoned, no points were awarded.)			Report
15	28	Auckland SuperSprint	(New Zealand) Scott McLaughlin	(New Zealand) Scott McLaughlin	(New Zealand) Shane van Gisbergen	Triple Eight Race Engineering	Report
15	29	Auckland SuperSprint	(Australia) Jamie Whincup	(Australia) Jamie Whincup	(New Zealand) Scott McLaughlin	DJR Team Penske	Report
16	30	Newcastle 500	(New Zealand) Shane van Gisbergen	(Australia) Jamie Whincup	(New Zealand) Scott McLaughlin (Note: Shane van Gisbergen was the winner of Race 30, but received a post-race penalty for a pit stop infringement and was reclassified as finishing fifth. Scott McLaughlin was recognised as the eventual race winner.)	DJR Team Penske	Report
16	31	Newcastle 500	(Australia) David Reynolds	(Australia) Jamie Whincup	(Australia) David Reynolds	Erebus Motorsport	Report

=== Points system ===
Points were awarded for each race at an event, to the driver or drivers of a car that completed at least 75% of the race distance and was running at the completion of the race. At least 50% of the planned race distance must be completed for the result to be valid and championship points awarded.

Points format	Position																											
Points format	1st	2nd	3rd	4th	5th	6th	7th	8th	9th	10th	11th	12th	13th	14th	15th	16th	17th	18th	19th	20th	21st	22nd	23rd	24th	25th	26th	27th	28th
Standard	150	138	129	120	111	102	96	90	84	78	72	69	66	63	60	57	54	51	48	45	42	39	36	33	30	27	24	21
Endurance	300	276	258	240	222	204	192	180	168	156	144	138	132	126	120	114	108	102	96	90	84	78	72	66	60	54		
Melbourne (long)	100	92	86	80	74	68	64	60	56	52	48	46	44	42	40	38	36	34	32	30	28	26	24	22	20	18		
Melbourne (short)	50	46	43	40	37	34	32	30	28	26	24	23	22	21	20	19	18	17	16	15	14	13	12	11	10	9		

- Standard: Used for all SuperSprint and street races, including the Gold Coast 600.
- Endurance: Used for the Sydney SuperNight 300, Sandown 500 and Bathurst 1000.
- Melbourne (long): Used for Race 1 and 3 of the Melbourne 400.
- Melbourne (short): Used for Race 2 and 4 of the Melbourne 400.

=== Drivers' championship ===
Pos.	Driver	No.	ADE (South Australia)		MEL (Victoria (state))				SYM (Tasmania)		PHI (Victoria (state))		BAR (Western Australia)		WIN (Victoria (state))		HID (Northern Territory)		TOW (Queensland)		QLD (Queensland)		SMP (New South Wales)	BEN (South Australia)		SAN (Victoria (state))	BAT (New South Wales)	SUR (Queensland)		PUK (New Zealand)		NEW (New South Wales)		Pen.	Pts.
1	(New Zealand) Scott McLaughlin	17	3	10	**1**	2	**15**	7	9	2	**1**	**1**	**1**	1	**5**	**3**	1	2	**3**	3	**1**	**2**	**3**	6	10	4	3	**5**	C	**2**	1	1	2	0	3944
2	(New Zealand) Shane van Gisbergen	97	**1**	**1**	4	4	13	13	**6**	25	3	6	3	**5**	3	2	2	4	2	**1**	2	1	1	1	2	2	5	10	C	1	2	**5**	4	0	3873
3	(Australia) Jamie Whincup	1	6	Ret	2	**1**	2	**3**	1	3	14	9	11	6	17	8	8	3	1	2	4	4	2	**4**	**1**	1	10	14	C	5	**3**	3	3	0	3433
4	(Australia) Craig Lowndes	888	9	7	16	Ret	6	12	2	**1**	4	7	5	3	13	12	7	10	4	4	3	8	4	10	8	3	1	2	C	11	4	23	11	0	3225
5	(Australia) David Reynolds	9	4	2	7	12	14	1	4	8	6	2	17	2	25	15	**3**	1	7	6	7	7	7	17	3	**5**	**13**	4	**C**	4	5	2	**1**	0	3206
6	(Australia) Chaz Mostert	55	7	4	5	6	10	4	Ret	10	5	8	10	11	14	10	17	12	13	5	6	3	5	9	12	10	4	1	C	3	6	21	7	0	2807
7	(Australia) Scott Pye	2	10	8	6	11	1	5	8	6	9	11	12	15	2	6	4	20	14	21	16	19	25	18	6	6	2	13	C	6	15	4	10	0	2608
8	(Australia) Rick Kelly	15	23	14	17	13	17	Ret	15	11	2	3	14	10	1	4	6	**5**	15	7	13	9	6	2	17	8	11	22	C	16	22	9	17	0	2515
9	(New Zealand) Fabian Coulthard	12	21	16	3	3	12	6	5	17	12	4	8	16	4	1	15	8	5	8	5	5	11	14	14	7	9	11	C	Ret	7	Ret	26	0	2477
10	(Australia) Nick Percat	8	11	15	9	7	3	2	12	9	26	13	9	7	18	14	9	6	10	13	10	25	8	11	5	24	7	6	C	8	10	Ret	12	0	2290
11	(Australia) Tim Slade	14	13	11	10	10	4	11	7	14	10	12	4	17	7	7	14	21	11	14	14	6	10	12	4	15	17	21	C	17	11	18	15	0	2249
12	(Australia) Mark Winterbottom	5	5	13	14	9	7	17	14	12	13	15	2	21	10	20	20	13	6	12	20	26	15	5	16	17	12	7	C	13	9	6	13	0	2192
13	(Australia) Garth Tander	33	16	3	8	18	26	9	13	7	11	10	19	14	8	22	5	7	21	19	11	11	20	28	20	9	6	9	C	25	13	22	8	0	2139
14	(Australia) James Courtney	25	2	6	12	20	5	Ret	3	4	17	Ret	13	4	9	19	23	11	17	10	8	Ret	Ret	8	13	16	Ret	3	C	9	16	7	5	0	2073
15	(Australia) Will Davison	230	8	12	25	14	8	10	18	22	8	21	7	20	11	13	13	14	9	Ret	17	12	17	7	7	11	19	12	C	20	19	16	20	0	1927
16	(Australia) Cam Waters	6	15	5	11	5	9	22	24	13	16	17	6	13	Ret	26	12	Ret	8	9	22	17	19	13	15	13	23	8	C	7	12	14	14	0	1873
17	(New Zealand) Andre Heimgartner	7	17	25	18	16	20	14	17	19	15	14	25	8	16	11	16	16	12	11	15	14	24	19	Ret	14	16	19	C	18	8	8	6	0	1775
18	(Australia) Michael Caruso	23	14	9	13	8	16	8	16	24	18	5	20	26	6	5	10	9	DNS	Ret	9	13	22	3	9	25	Ret	23	C	10	17	15	19	0	1765
19	(Australia) Jack Le Brocq	19	20	22	20	22	22	21	10	5	20	18	16	9	15	17	18	Ret	22	18	21	10	9	16	18	22	15	16	C	22	23	19	18	0	1673
20	(Australia) Anton de Pasquale	99	19	17	15	19	21	15	19	15	7	16	18	23	12	16	11	15	19	17	26	16	18	24	11	12	24	Ret	C	19	24	11	16	95	1524
21	(Australia) Lee Holdsworth	18	12	24	19	15	19	23	11	23	22	25	23	18	23	21	21	Ret	18	15	24	21	12	20	Ret	23	21	15	C	15	14	12	9	0	1443
22	(Australia) James Golding	34	Ret	19	21	17	24	Ret	23	18	25	19	22	25	20	25	26	22	16	16	18	15	13	21	24	18	8	24	C	14	21	20	25	0	1418
23	(Switzerland) Simona de Silvestro	78	18	18	Ret	23	23	16	22	21	24	22	15	12	22	23	22	17	25	22	19	20	14	23	23	Ret	14	18	C	21	18	10	24	25	1323
24	(Australia) Tim Blanchard	21	Ret	23	23	21	11	20	20	16	21	23	Ret	24	24	18	19	18	24	24	23	22	16	15	21	19	18	17	C	12	26	Ret	22	0	1277
25	(New Zealand) Richie Stanaway	56	Ret	20	24	Ret	25	18	25	Ret	19	20	24	19	21	9	25	19	23	20	12	18	21	22	22	20	22	Ret	C	23	20	17	23	0	1214
26	(Australia) Todd Hazelwood	35	22	21	22	Ret	18	19	21	20	23	24	21	22	19	24	24	23	20	23	27	24	23	26	25	21	20	20	C	24	25	13	21	0	1201
27	(New Zealand) Steven Richards	888																								3	1	2	C					0	696
28	(France) Alexandre Prémat	17																								4	3	5	C					0	609
29	(New Zealand) Earl Bamber	97																								2	5	10	C					0	576
30	(Australia) James Moffat	55																								10	4	1	C					0	546
31	(Australia) Warren Luff	2																								6	2	13	C					0	546
32	(Australia) Paul Dumbrell	1																								1	10	14	C					0	519
33	(Australia) Macauley Jones	4/8															27	24						25	19	24	7	6	C					0	495
34	(Australia) Luke Youlden	9																								**5**	13	4	C					0	474
35	(New Zealand) Chris Pither	33																								9	6	9	C					0	456
36	(Australia) Tony D'Alberto	12																								7	9	11	C					0	432
37	(Australia) Garry Jacobson	15																								8	11	22	C					0	363
38	(Australia) Dean Canto	5																								17	12	7	C					0	342
39	(Australia) Richard Muscat	34																								18	8	24	C					0	315
40	(Australia) Alex Davison	230																								11	19	12	C					0	309
41	(Australia) David Russell	6																								13	23	8	C					0	294
42	(Australia) Aaren Russell	7																								14	16	19	C					0	288
43	(Australia) Ashley Walsh	14																								15	17	21	C					0	270
44	(Australia) Jonathon Webb	19																								22	15	16	C					0	255
45	(Australia) Dale Wood	21																								19	18	17	C					0	252
46	(Australia) Jack Perkins	25																								16	Ret	3	C					0	243
47	(Australia) Bryce Fullwood	35																								21	20	20	C					0	219
48	(Australia) Jason Bright	18																								23	21	15	C					0	216
49	(Australia) Will Brown	99																								12	24	Ret	C					0	204
50	(Australia) Alex Rullo	78																								Ret	14	18	C					0	177
51	(Australia) Steve Owen	56																								20	22	Ret	C					0	168
52	(Australia) Dean Fiore	23																								25	Ret	23	C					0	96
53	(Australia) Kurt Kostecki	42																			25	23		27	Ret									0	90
Pos.	Driver	No.	ADE (South Australia)		MEL (Victoria (state))				SYM (Tasmania)		PHI (Victoria (state))		BAR (Western Australia)		WIN (Victoria (state))		HID (Northern Territory)		TOW (Queensland)		QLD (Queensland)		SMP (New South Wales)	BEN (South Australia)		SAN (Victoria (state))	BAT (New South Wales)	SUR (Queensland)		PUK (New Zealand)		NEW (New South Wales)		Pen.	Pts.

Key
Colour	Result
Gold	Winner
Silver	Second place
Bronze	Third place
Green	Other points position
Blue	Other classified position
Blue	Not classified, finished (NC)
Purple	Not classified, retired (Ret)
Red	Did not qualify (DNQ)
Red	Did not pre-qualify (DNPQ)
Black	Disqualified (DSQ)
White	Did not start (DNS)
White	Race cancelled (C)
Blank	Did not practice (DNP)
Blank	Excluded (EX)
Blank	Did not arrive (DNA)
Blank	Withdrawn (WD)
Blank	Did not enter (cell empty)
Text formatting	Meaning
**Bold**	Pole position
Italics	Fastest lap

Results count toward the Enduro Cup.

=== Teams' championship ===
Pos.	Team	No.	ADE (South Australia)		MEL (Victoria (state))				SYM (Tasmania)		PHI (Victoria (state))		BAR (Western Australia)		WIN (Victoria (state))		HID (Northern Territory)		TOW (Queensland)		QLD (Queensland)		SMP (New South Wales)	BEN (South Australia)		SAN (Victoria (state))	BAT (New South Wales)	SUR (Queensland)		PUK (New Zealand)		NEW (New South Wales)		Pen.	Pts.
1	Triple Eight Race Engineering	1	6	Ret	2	**1**	2	**3**	1	3	14	9	11	6	17	8	8	3	1	2	4	4	2	**4**	**1**	1	10	14	C	5	**3**	3	3	30	7276
1	Triple Eight Race Engineering	97	**1**	**1**	4	4	13	13	**6**	25	3	6	3	**5**	3	2	2	4	2	**1**	2	1	1	1	2	2	5	10	C	1	2	**5**	4	30	7276
2	DJR Team Penske	12	21	16	3	3	12	6	5	17	12	4	8	16	4	1	15	8	5	8	5	5	11	14	14	7	9	11	C	Ret	7	Ret	26	0	6421
2	DJR Team Penske	17	3	10	**1**	2	**15**	7	9	2	**1**	**1**	**1**	1	**5**	**3**	1	2	**3**	3	**1**	**2**	**3**	6	10	4	3	**5**	C	**2**	1	1	2	0	6421
3	Tickford Racing	5	5	13	14	9	7	17	14	12	13	15	2	21	10	20	20	13	6	12	20	26	15	5	16	17	12	7	C	13	9	6	13	0	4999
3	Tickford Racing	55	7	4	5	6	10	4	Ret	10	5	8	10	11	14	10	17	12	13	5	6	3	5	9	12	10	4	1	C	3	6	21	7	0	4999
4	Erebus Motorsport	9	4	2	7	12	14	1	4	8	6	2	17	2	25	15	**3**	1	7	6	7	7	7	17	3	**5**	**13**	4	**C**	4	5	2	**1**	90	4731
4	Erebus Motorsport	99	19	17	15	19	20	15	19	15	7	16	18	23	12	16	11	15	19	17	26	17	18	24	11	12	23	Ret	C	19	24	11	16	90	4731
5	Walkinshaw Andretti United	2	10	8	6	11	1	5	8	6	9	11	12	15	2	6	4	20	14	21	16	19	25	18	6	6	2	13	C	6	15	4	10	0	4681
5	Walkinshaw Andretti United	25	2	6	12	20	5	Ret	3	4	17	Ret	13	4	9	19	23	11	17	10	8	Ret	Ret	8	13	16	Ret	3	C	9	16	7	5	0	4681
6	Brad Jones Racing	8	11	15	9	7	3	2	12	9	26	13	9	7	19	14	9	6	10	13	10	25	8	11	5	24	7	6	C	8	10	Ret	12	30	4509
6	Brad Jones Racing	14	13	11	10	10	4	11	7	14	10	12	4	17	7	7	14	21	11	14	14	6	10	12	4	15	17	21	C	17	11	18	15	30	4509
7	Nissan Motorsport	7	17	25	18	16	21	14	17	19	15	14	25	8	16	11	16	16	12	11	15	14	24	19	Ret	14	16	19	C	18	8	8	6	0	4290
7	Nissan Motorsport	15	23	14	17	13	17	Ret	15	11	2	3	14	10	1	4	6	**5**	15	7	13	9	6	2	17	8	11	22	C	16	22	9	17	0	4290
8	Garry Rogers Motorsport	33	16	3	8	18	26	9	13	7	11	10	19	14	8	22	5	7	21	19	11	11	20	28	20	9	6	9	C	25	13	22	8	0	3557
8	Garry Rogers Motorsport	34	Ret	19	21	17	24	Ret	23	18	25	19	22	25	21	25	26	22	16	16	18	16	13	21	24	18	8	24	C	14	21	20	25	0	3557
9	Triple Eight Race Engineering	888	9	7	16	Ret	6	12	2	**1**	4	7	5	3	13	12	7	10	4	4	3	8	4	10	8	3	1	2	C	11	4	23	11	0	3225
10	Nissan Motorsport	23	14	9	13	8	16	8	16	24	18	5	20	26	6	5	10	9	DNS	Ret	9	13	22	3	9	25	Ret	23	C	10	17	15	19	0	3113
10	Nissan Motorsport	78	18	18	Ret	23	23	16	22	21	24	22	15	12	18	23	22	17	25	22	19	21	14	23	23	Ret	14	18	C	21	18	10	24	0	3113
11	Tickford Racing	6	15	5	11	5	9	22	24	13	16	17	6	13	Ret	26	12	Ret	8	9	22	15	19	13	15	13	23	8	C	7	12	14	14	80	3007
11	Tickford Racing	56	Ret	20	24	Ret	25	18	25	Ret	19	20	24	19	22	9	25	19	23	20	12	18	21	22	22	20	22	Ret	C	23	20	17	23	80	3007
12	23Red Racing	230	8	12	25	14	8	10	18	22	8	21	7	20	11	13	13	14	9	Ret	17	12	17	7	7	11	19	12	C	20	19	16	20	0	1927
13	Tekno Autosports	19	20	22	20	22	22	21	10	5	20	18	16	9	15	17	18	Ret	22	18	21	10	9	16	18	22	15	16	C	22	23	19	18	30	1643
14	Team 18	18	12	24	19	15	19	23	11	23	22	25	23	18	23	21	21	Ret	18	15	24	20	12	20	Ret	23	21	15	C	15	14	12	9	0	1413
15	Tim Blanchard Racing	21	Ret	23	23	21	11	20	20	16	21	23	Ret	24	24	18	19	18	24	24	23	22	16	15	21	19	18	17	C	12	26	Ret	22	30	1247
16	Matt Stone Racing	35	22	21	22	Ret	18	19	21	20	23	24	21	22	20	24	24	23	20	23	27	24	23	26	25	21	20	20	C	24	25	13	21	0	1201
Pos.	Team	No.	ADE (South Australia)		MEL (Victoria (state))				SYM (Tasmania)		PHI (Victoria (state))		BAR (Western Australia)		WIN (Victoria (state))		HID (Northern Territory)		TOW (Queensland)		QLD (Queensland)		SMP (New South Wales)	BEN (South Australia)		SAN (Victoria (state))	BAT (New South Wales)	SUR (Queensland)		PUK (New Zealand)		NEW (New South Wales)		Pen.	Pts.

Key
Colour	Result
Gold	Winner
Silver	Second place
Bronze	Third place
Green	Other points position
Blue	Other classified position
Blue	Not classified, finished (NC)
Purple	Not classified, retired (Ret)
Red	Did not qualify (DNQ)
Red	Did not pre-qualify (DNPQ)
Black	Disqualified (DSQ)
White	Did not start (DNS)
White	Race cancelled (C)
Blank	Did not practice (DNP)
Blank	Excluded (EX)
Blank	Did not arrive (DNA)
Blank	Withdrawn (WD)
Blank	Did not enter (cell empty)
Text formatting	Meaning
**Bold**	Pole position
Italics	Fastest lap

Results count toward the Enduro Cup.

=== Enduro Cup ===
Pos.	Drivers	No.	**SAN** **(Victoria (state))**	**BAT** **(New South Wales)**	**SUR** **(Queensland)**		Pen.	Pts.
1	Craig Lowndes / Steven Richards	888	3	1	2	C	0	696
2	Scott McLaughlin / Alexandre Prémat	17	4	3	**5**	C	0	609
3	Shane van Gisbergen / Earl Bamber	97	2	5	10	C	0	576
4	Scott Pye / Warren Luff	2	6	2	13	C	0	546
5	Chaz Mostert / James Moffat	55	10	4	1	C	0	546
6	Jamie Whincup / Paul Dumbrell	1	1	10	14	C	0	519
7	David Reynolds / Luke Youlden	9	**5**	**13**	4	**C**	0	474
8	Garth Tander / Chris Pither	33	9	6	9	C	0	456
9	Fabian Coulthard / Tony D'Alberto	12	7	9	11	C	0	432
10	Rick Kelly / Garry Jacobson	15	8	11	22	C	0	363
11	Nick Percat / Macauley Jones	8	24	7	6	C	0	360
12	Mark Winterbottom / Dean Canto	5	17	12	7	C	0	342
13	James Golding / Richard Muscat	34	18	8	24	C	0	315
14	Will Davison / Alex Davison	230	11	19	12	C	0	309
15	Cam Waters / David Russell	6	13	23	8	C	0	294
16	Andre Heimgartner / Aaren Russell	7	14	16	19	C	0	288
17	Tim Slade / Ashley Walsh	14	15	17	21	C	0	270
18	Jack Le Brocq / Jonathon Webb	19	22	15	16	C	0	255
19	Tim Blanchard / Dale Wood	21	19	18	17	C	0	252
20	James Courtney / Jack Perkins	25	16	Ret	3	C	0	243
21	Todd Hazelwood / Bryce Fullwood	35	21	20	20	C	0	219
22	Lee Holdsworth / Jason Bright	18	23	21	15	C	0	216
23	Anton de Pasquale / Will Brown	99	12	24	Ret	C	0	204
24	Simona de Silvestro / Alex Rullo	78	Ret	14	18	C	0	177
25	Richie Stanaway / Steve Owen	56	20	22	Ret	C	0	168
26	Michael Caruso / Dean Fiore	23	25	Ret	23	C	0	96
Pos.	Drivers	No.	**SAN** **(Victoria (state))**	**BAT** **(New South Wales)**	**SUR** **(Queensland)**		Pen.	Pts.

Colour	Result
Gold	Winner
Silver	Second place
Bronze	Third place
Green	Points classification
Blue	Non-points classification
Blue	Non-classified finish (NC)
Purple	Retired, not classified (Ret)
Red	Did not qualify (DNQ)
Red	Did not pre-qualify (DNPQ)
Black	Disqualified (DSQ)
White	Did not start (DNS)
White	Withdrew (WD)
White	Race cancelled (C)
Blank	Did not practice (DNP)
Blank	Did not arrive (DNA)
Blank	Excluded (EX)

Bold - Pole position
Italics - Fastest lap

=== Manufacturers' championship ===
The Manufacturers' championship was awarded to Holden.
