= 2008 Perth 400 =

2008 Supercar Championship event

(Western Australia) 2008 BigPond 400
Event Information
- Round 4 of 14 in the 2008 V8 Supercar Championship Series
- Date: 9–11 May 2008
- Location: Perth, Western Australia
- Venue: Barbagallo Raceway
- Weather: Fine

Results
Race 1
Distance	50 laps	120 km
Pole position	Mark Winterbottom; Ford Performance Racing	56.4362
Winner	Mark Winterbottom; Ford Performance Racing	53:09.6602
Race 2
Distance	50 laps	120 km
Winner	Mark Winterbottom; Ford Performance Racing	53:34.4946
Race 3
Distance	50 laps	120 km
Winner	Mark Winterbottom; Ford Performance Racing	49:06.2004
Round Results
First	Mark Winterbottom; Ford Performance Racing	300 pts
Second	Garth Tander; Holden Racing Team	270 pts
Third	Jamie Whincup; Triple Eight Race Engineering	236 pts

The 2008 BigPond 400 was the fourth round of the 2008 V8 Supercar season. It was held on the weekend of 9 to 11 May at Barbagallo Raceway in Wanneroo, north of Perth, Western Australia.

== Qualifying ==
Qualifying was held on Saturday 10 May. Mark Winterbottom snatched pole position away from Mark Skaife in the final seconds of qualifying, which had to that point looked like an all-Holden Racing Team front row with Garth Tander just behind his teammate. Craig Lowndes qualified fourth for Triple Eight Race Engineering. James Courtney debuted a new Stone Brothers Racing Falcon in fifth place. Todd Kelly likewise made a stellar debut with a new car, qualifying eighth. Jamie Whincup racing the repaired Craig Lowndes car from the Clipsal 500 was a disappointing 22nd, starting alongside fellow points front runner Lee Holdsworth.

== Race 1 ==
Race 1 was held on Saturday 10 May. Mark Winterbottom took his second race victory of the year, a surprisingly comfortable win ahead of the HRT pair of Mark Skaife and Garth Tander. Tander was pushed hard by Steven Richards and Craig Lowndes. A collision at race start saw Jason Bright touch Greg Murphy who in turn made contact with Michael Caruso, sending Bright and Caruso out of control towards turn 7, where crossing the track Caruso struck Shane van Gisbergen. The incident triggered a safety car. Jamie Whincup and Will Davison charged through to seventh and eight positions from poor qualifying places. James Courtney was fighting amongst that group but fading rear tyres led Courtney to attempt defensive moves that raised the ire of race control, leading to first the bad sportsmanship flag, then a black flag drive through penalty which dropped him down field.

== Race 2 ==
Race 2 was held on Sunday 11 May. Winterbottom backed it up with a second race victory, pushed all the way by Garth Tander. Jason Richards missed the start with engine problems. A slow start from Mark Skaife off the front row saw a collision with Steven Richards at turn 3 of the first lap. Skaife broadsided the wall but Richards attempted to continue with a punctured left rear tyre, limping back to the pits. Russell Ingall result was caused by a drive-through penalty for pit-lane speeding. Lee Holdsworth was pinged for a drive-through for an unsafe pitstop release, emerging onto the track as rain began to fall and made contact with Paul Dumbrell. Cameron McConville slithered into the stopped cars. Ingall, likewise put down-field by his penalty stop damaged his steering in a clash with race leader Jamie Whincup as Ingall was being lapped. Ingall later picked up a $5,000 fine for careless driving. Whincup stayed out during the brief rain squall, and took advantage of being able to pitstop at a better time, jumping back into the field in third place, right in front of teammate Craig Lowndes, the Triple Eight Race Engineering pair race to the finish together. James Courtney recovered from race 1 dramas to finish seventh while Steven Richards recovered to ninth position falling just short of overtaking Todd Kelly. Shane van Gisbergen's repaired Falcon just made the top ten.

== Race 3 ==
Race 3 was held on Sunday 11 May. An early race clash between Russell Ingall and Jason Richards, saw Richards into the pits with a front left puncture and a flapping door for Ingall. Ingall then subsequently picked up his second pit lane speeding infringement of the weekend.

== Results ==
Results as follows:

=== Qualifying ===
Pos	No	Name	Car	Team	Part 3	Part 2	Part 1
1	5	(Australia) Mark Winterbottom	Ford BF Falcon	Ford Performance Racing	0:56.4362		
2	2	(Australia) Mark Skaife	Holden VE Commodore	Holden Racing Team	0:56.4786		
3	1	(Australia) Garth Tander	Holden VE Commodore	Holden Racing Team	0:56.5891		
4	888	(Australia) Craig Lowndes	Ford BF Falcon	Triple Eight Race Engineering	0:56.7294		
5	4	(Australia) James Courtney	Ford BF Falcon	Stone Brothers Racing	0:56.8055		
6	6	(New Zealand) Steven Richards	Ford BF Falcon	Ford Performance Racing	0:56.8862		
7	15	(Australia) Rick Kelly	Holden VE Commodore	HSV Dealer Team	0:56.9660		
8	7	(Australia) Todd Kelly	Holden VE Commodore	Perkins Engineering	0:56.9664		
9	16	(Australia) Paul Dumbrell	Holden VE Commodore	HSV Dealer Team	0:57.0601		
10	9	(New Zealand) Shane van Gisbergen	Ford BF Falcon	Stone Brothers Racing	0:57.3704		
11	3	(New Zealand) Jason Richards	Holden VE Commodore	Tasman Motorsport		0:57.0268	
12	34	(Australia) Michael Caruso	Holden VE Commodore	Garry Rogers Motorsport		0:57.0338	
13	14	(Australia) Cameron McConville	Holden VE Commodore	Brad Jones Racing		0:57.0472	
14	39	(Australia) Russell Ingall	Holden VE Commodore	Paul Morris Motorsport		0:57.0619	
15	25	(Australia) Jason Bright	Ford BF Falcon	Britek Motorsport		0:57.0958	
16	51	(New Zealand) Greg Murphy	Holden VE Commodore	Tasman Motorsport		0:57.1933	
17	18	(Australia) Will Davison	Ford BF Falcon	Dick Johnson Racing		0:57.2148	
18	12	(Australia) Andrew Jones	Holden VE Commodore	Brad Jones Racing		0:57.2549	
19	50	(Australia) Andrew Thompson	Holden VE Commodore	Paul Weel Racing		0:57.3061	
20	26	(Australia) Marcus Marshall	Ford BF Falcon	Britek Motorsport		0:57.5735	
21	33	(Australia) Lee Holdsworth	Holden VE Commodore	Garry Rogers Motorsport			0:57.2779
22	88	(Australia) Jamie Whincup	Ford BF Falcon	Triple Eight Race Engineering			0:57.2806
23	111	(New Zealand) Fabian Coulthard	Ford BF Falcon	Paul Cruickshank Racing			0:57.2812
24	17	(Australia) Steven Johnson	Ford BF Falcon	Dick Johnson Racing			0:57.2842
25	67	(Australia) Paul Morris	Holden VE Commodore	Paul Morris Motorsport			0:57.3050
26	11	(Australia) Shane Price	Holden VE Commodore	Perkins Engineering			0:57.3176
27	777	(Australia) Michael Patrizi	Ford BF Falcon	Ford Rising Stars Racing			0:57.0958
28	55	(Australia) Tony D'Alberto	Holden VE Commodore	Rod Nash Racing			0:57.7454
29	021	(New Zealand) Kayne Scott	Ford BF Falcon	Team Kiwi Racing			0:59.0170

=== Race 1 ===
Pos	No	Name	Team	Vehicle	Laps	Time/Retired	Grid	Points
1	5	(Australia) Mark Winterbottom	Ford Performance Racing	Ford Falcon (BF)	50	53:09.6602	1	100
2	2	(Australia) Mark Skaife	Holden Racing Team	Holden Commodore (VE)	50	+2.6s	2	92
3	1	(Australia) Garth Tander	Holden Racing Team	Holden Commodore (VE)	50	+5.9s	3	86
4	6	(New Zealand) Steven Richards	Ford Performance Racing	Ford Falcon (BF)	50	+6.2s	6	80
5	888	(Australia) Craig Lowndes	Triple Eight Race Engineering	Ford Falcon (BF)	50	+7.7s	4	74
6	15	(Australia) Rick Kelly	HSV Dealer Team	Holden Commodore (VE)	50	+14.7s	7	68
7	88	(Australia) Jamie Whincup	Triple Eight Race Engineering	Ford Falcon (BF)	50	+15.8s	22	64
8	18	(Australia) Will Davison	Dick Johnson Racing	Ford Falcon (BF)	50	+18.0s	17	60
9	7	(Australia) Todd Kelly	Perkins Engineering	Holden Commodore (VE)	50	+22.2s	8	56
10	14	(Australia) Cameron McConville	Brad Jones Racing	Holden Commodore (VE)	50	+24.3s	13	52
11	39	(Australia) Russell Ingall	Paul Morris Motorsport	Holden Commodore (VE)	50	+27.6s	14	48
12	51	(New Zealand) Greg Murphy	Tasman Motorsport	Holden Commodore (VE)	50	+30.8s	16	46
13	17	(Australia) Steven Johnson	Dick Johnson Racing	Ford Falcon (BF)	50	+30.9s	24	44
14	12	(Australia) Andrew Jones	Brad Jones Racing	Holden Commodore (VE)	50	+32.0s	18	42
15	16	(Australia) Paul Dumbrell	HSV Dealer Team	Holden Commodore (VE)	50	+32.8s	9	40
16	67	(Australia) Paul Morris	Paul Morris Motorsport	Holden Commodore (VE)	50	+34.0s	25	38
17	111	(New Zealand) Fabian Coulthard	Paul Cruickshank Racing	Ford Falcon (BF)	50	+36.2s	23	36
18	11	(Australia) Shane Price	Perkins Engineering	Holden Commodore (VE)	50	+37.1s	26	34
19	777	(Australia) Michael Patrizi	Ford Rising Stars Racing	Ford Falcon (BF)	50	+42.0s	27	32
20	4	(Australia) James Courtney	Stone Brothers Racing	Ford Falcon (BF)	50	+45.4s	5	30
21	55	(Australia) Tony D'Alberto	Rod Nash Racing	Holden Commodore (VE)	50	+45.6s	28	28
22	26	(Australia) Marcus Marshall	Britek Motorsport	Ford Falcon (BF)	49	+ 1 lap	20	26
23	021	(Australia) Kayne Scott	Team Kiwi Racing	Ford Falcon (BF)	49	+ 1 lap	29	24
24	33	(Australia) Lee Holdsworth	Garry Rogers Motorsport	Holden Commodore (VE)	49	+ 1 lap	21	22
Ret	3	(New Zealand) Jason Richards	Tasman Motorsport	Holden Commodore (VE)	22	Engine	11	
Ret	50	(Australia) Andrew Thompson	Paul Weel Racing	Holden Commodore (VE)	7	Engine	19	
Ret	9	(New Zealand) Shane van Gisbergen	Stone Brothers Racing	Ford Falcon (BF)	0	Collision	10	
Ret	34	(Australia) Michael Caruso	Garry Rogers Motorsport	Holden Commodore (VE)	0	Collision	12	
Ret	25	(Australia) Jason Bright	Britek Motorsport	Ford Falcon (BF)	0	Collision	15	
Fastest Lap: Mark Skaife (Holden Racing Team) - 57.3567 on lap 7

=== Race 2 ===
Pos	No	Name	Team	Vehicle	Laps	Time/Retired	Grid	Points
1	5	(Australia) Mark Winterbottom	Ford Performance Racing	Ford Falcon (BF)	50	53:34.4946	1	100
2	1	(Australia) Garth Tander	Holden Racing Team	Holden Commodore (VE)	50	+1.6s	3	92
3	88	(Australia) Jamie Whincup	Triple Eight Race Engineering	Ford Falcon (BF)	50	+4.0s	7	86
4	888	(Australia) Craig Lowndes	Triple Eight Race Engineering	Ford Falcon (BF)	50	+5.1s	5	80
5	15	(Australia) Rick Kelly	HSV Dealer Team	Holden Commodore (VE)	50	+14.3s	6	74
6	18	(Australia) Will Davison	Dick Johnson Racing	Ford Falcon (BF)	50	+14.6s	8	68
7	4	(Australia) James Courtney	Stone Brothers Racing	Ford Falcon (BF)	50	+22.3s	20	64
8	7	(Australia) Todd Kelly	Perkins Engineering	Holden Commodore (VE)	50	+25.0s	9	60
9	6	(New Zealand) Steven Richards	Ford Performance Racing	Ford Falcon (BF)	50	+25.1s	4	56
10	9	(New Zealand) Shane van Gisbergen	Stone Brothers Racing	Ford Falcon (BF)	50	+28.3s	27	52
11	12	(Australia) Andrew Jones	Brad Jones Racing	Holden Commodore (VE)	50	+32.3s	14	48
12	111	(New Zealand) Fabian Coulthard	Paul Cruickshank Racing	Ford Falcon (BF)	50	+32.7s	17	46
13	17	(Australia) Steven Johnson	Dick Johnson Racing	Ford Falcon (BF)	50	+33.7s	13	44
14	25	(Australia) Jason Bright	Britek Motorsport	Ford Falcon (BF)	50	+38.7s	29	42
15	51	(New Zealand) Greg Murphy	Tasman Motorsport	Holden Commodore (VE)	50	+39.2s	12	40
16	34	(Australia) Michael Caruso	Garry Rogers Motorsport	Holden Commodore (VE)	50	+39.7s	28	38
17	26	(Australia) Marcus Marshall	Britek Motorsport	Ford Falcon (BF)	50	+47.7s	22	36
18	50	(Australia) Andrew Thompson	Paul Weel Racing	Holden Commodore (VE)	50	+47.9s	26	34
19	11	(Australia) Shane Price	Perkins Engineering	Holden Commodore (VE)	50	+52.5s	18	32
20	55	(Australia) Tony D'Alberto	Rod Nash Racing	Holden Commodore (VE)	49	+ 1 lap	21	30
21	777	(Australia) Michael Patrizi	Ford Rising Stars Racing	Ford Falcon (BF)	49	+ 1 lap	19	28
22	16	(Australia) Paul Dumbrell	HSV Dealer Team	Holden Commodore (VE)	49	+ 1 lap	15	26
23	33	(Australia) Lee Holdsworth	Garry Rogers Motorsport	Holden Commodore (VE)	49	+ 1 Lap	24	24
24	021	(New Zealand) Kayne Scott	Team Kiwi Racing	Ford Falcon (BF)	49	+ 1 lap	23	22
25	67	(Australia) Paul Morris	Paul Morris Motorsport	Holden Commodore (VE)	45	+ 5 laps	16	20
Ret	39	(Australia) Russell Ingall	Paul Morris Motorsport	Holden Commodore (VE)	17	Steering	11	
Ret	14	(Australia) Cameron McConville	Brad Jones Racing	Holden Commodore (VE)	17	Collision	10	
Ret	2	(Australia) Mark Skaife	Holden Racing Team	Holden Commodore (VE)	0	Collision	2	
DNS	3	(New Zealand) Jason Richards	Tasman Motorsport	Holden Commodore (VE)				
Fastest Lap: Mark Winterbottom (Ford Performance Racing) - 57.3193 on lap 8

=== Race 3 ===
Pos	No	Name	Team	Vehicle	Laps	Time/Retired	Grid	Points
1	5	(Australia) Mark Winterbottom	Ford Performance Racing	Ford Falcon (BF)	50	49:06.2004	1	100
2	1	(Australia) Garth Tander	Holden Racing Team	Holden Commodore (VE)	50	+4.1s	2	92
3	88	(Australia) Jamie Whincup	Triple Eight Race Engineering	Ford Falcon (BF)	50	+4.8s	3	86
4	888	(Australia) Craig Lowndes	Triple Eight Race Engineering	Ford Falcon (BF)	50	+17.2s	4	80
5	18	(Australia) Will Davison	Dick Johnson Racing	Ford Falcon (BF)	50	+19.9s	6	74
6	15	(Australia) Rick Kelly	HSV Dealer Team	Holden Commodore (VE)	50	+20.9s	5	68
7	6	(New Zealand) Steven Richards	Ford Performance Racing	Ford Falcon (BF)	50	+21.1s	9	64
8	4	(Australia) James Courtney	Stone Brothers Racing	Ford Falcon (BF)	50	+23.1s	7	60
9	111	(New Zealand) Fabian Coulthard	Paul Cruickshank Racing	Ford Falcon (BF)	50	+24.7s	12	56
10	14	(Australia) Cameron McConville	Brad Jones Racing	Holden Commodore (VE)	50	+26.0s	26	52
11	67	(Australia) Paul Morris	Paul Morris Motorsport	Holden Commodore (VE)	50	+26.7s	25	48
12	9	(New Zealand) Shane van Gisbergen	Stone Brothers Racing	Ford Falcon (BF)	50	+29.5s	10	46
13	25	(Australia) Jason Bright	Britek Motorsport	Ford Falcon (BF)	50	+33.6s	14	44
14	12	(Australia) Andrew Jones	Brad Jones Racing	Holden Commodore (VE)	50	+35.5s	11	42
15	17	(Australia) Steven Johnson	Dick Johnson Racing	Ford Falcon (BF)	50	+42.4s	13	40
16	16	(Australia) Paul Dumbrell	HSV Dealer Team	Holden Commodore (VE)	50	+42.7s	22	38
17	34	(Australia) Michael Caruso	Garry Rogers Motorsport	Holden Commodore (VE)	50	+43.2s	16	36
18	50	(Australia) Andrew Thompson	Paul Weel Racing	Holden Commodore (VE)	50	+43.5s	18	34
19	26	(Australia) Marcus Marshall	Britek Motorsport	Ford Falcon (BF)	50	+58.0s	17	32
20	777	(Australia) Michael Patrizi	Ford Rising Stars Racing	Ford Falcon (BF)	49	+ 1 lap	21	30
21	51	(New Zealand) Greg Murphy	Tasman Motorsport	Holden Commodore (VE)	49	+ 1 lap	15	28
23	55	(Australia) Tony D'Alberto	Rod Nash Racing	Holden Commodore (VE)	48	+ 2 laps	20	24
24	39	(Australia) Russell Ingall	Paul Morris Motorsport	Holden Commodore (VE)	48	+ 2 laps	27	22
Ret	7	(Australia) Todd Kelly	Perkins Engineering	Holden Commodore (VE)	38	Electrical	8	
Ret	021	(New Zealand) Kayne Scott	Team Kiwi Racing	Ford Falcon (BF)	13	Steering	24	
Ret	11	(Australia) Shane Price	Perkins Engineering	Holden Commodore (VE)	9	Retired	19	
Ret	33	(Australia) Lee Holdsworth	Garry Rogers Motorsport	Holden Commodore (VE)	7	Steering	23	
DNS	3	(New Zealand) Jason Richards	Tasman Motorsport	Holden Commodore (VE)		Did not start		
DNS	2	(Australia) Mark Skaife	Holden Racing Team	Holden Commodore (VE)		Did not start		
Fastest Lap: Mark Winterbottom (Ford Performance Racing) - 57.7152 on lap 2

== Standings ==
After round 4 of 14

Pos	No	Name	Team	Points
1	1	(Australia) Garth Tander	Holden Racing Team	896
2	15	(Australia) Rick Kelly	HSV Dealer Team	882
3	5	(Australia) Mark Winterbottom	Ford Performance Racing	872
4	88	(Australia) Jamie Whincup	Triple Eight Race Engineering	776
5	6	(New Zealand) Steven Richards	Ford Performance Racing	721

== Support categories ==
The 2008 BigPond 400 had four support categories.

Category	Round winner
Australian Carrera Cup Championship	(New Zealand) Craig Baird (Porsche 997 GT3 Cup)
V8 Utes	(Australia) Grant Johnson (Holden VE Ute SS)
Mini Challenge Australia	(Australia) Damien White (Mini Cooper S)
Historic Touring Cars	(Australia) Paul Stubber (Chevrolet Camaro)
