= 2008 Darwin Triple Crown =

2008 Supercar Championship event

(Northern Territory) 2008 Skycity Triple Crown
Event Information
- Round 6 of 14 in the 2008 V8 Supercar Championship Series
- Date: 4–6 July 2008
- Location: Darwin, Northern Territory, Australia
- Venue: Hidden Valley Raceway
- Weather: Fine

Results
Race 1
Distance	42 laps	120 km
Pole position	Mark Winterbottom; Ford Performance Racing	1:09.9646
Winner	Mark Winterbottom; Ford Performance Racing	51:11.6729
Race 2
Distance	42 laps	120 km
Winner	Garth Tander; Holden Racing Team	52:24.0187
Race 3
Distance	42 laps	120 km
Winner	Steven Richards; Ford Performance Racing	52:15.1404
Round Results
First	Steven Richards; Ford Performance Racing	284 pts
Second	Mark Winterbottom; Ford Performance Racing	278 pts
Third	Garth Tander; Holden Racing Team	272 pts

The 2008 Skycity Triple Crown was the sixth round of the 2008 V8 Supercar season. It was held on the weekend of July 4 to 6 at Hidden Valley Raceway in Darwin, Australia.

== Race results ==
=== Qualifying ===
Position	Number	Name	Car	Team	Part 3	Part 2	Part 1
1	5	Mark Winterbottom	Ford BF Falcon	Ford Performance Racing	1:09.9646		
2	6	Steven Richards	Ford BF Falcon	Ford Performance Racing	1:09.9757		
3	88	Jamie Whincup	Ford BF Falcon	Team Vodafone	1:09.9849		
4	1	Garth Tander	Holden VE Commodore	Holden Racing Team	1:10.0976		
5	888	Craig Lowndes	Ford BF Falcon	Team Vodafone	1:10.1072		
6	3	Jason Richards	Holden VE Commodore	Tasman Motorsport	1:10.1596		
7	39	Russell Ingall	Holden VE Commodore	Supercheap Auto Racing	1:10.1671		
8	33	Lee Holdsworth	Holden VE Commodore	Garry Rogers Motorsport	1:10.2598		
9	18	Will Davison	Ford BF Falcon	Jim Beam Racing	1:10.2642		
10	2	Mark Skaife	Holden VE Commodore	Holden Racing Team	1:10.4850		
11	4	James Courtney	Ford BF Falcon	Stone Brothers Racing		1:10.1797	
12	17	Steven Johnson	Ford BF Falcon	Jim Beam Racing		1:10.2383	
13	15	Rick Kelly	Holden VE Commodore	HSV Dealer Team		1:10.2960	
14	67	Paul Morris	Holden VE Commodore	Supercheap Auto Racing		1:10.3447	
15	111	Fabian Coulthard	Ford BF Falcon	Glenfords Racing		1:10.3595	
16	7	Todd Kelly	Holden VE Commodore	Jack Daniel's Racing		1:10.4316	
17	25	Jason Bright	Ford BF Falcon	Britek Motorsport		1:10.6487	
18	14	Cameron McConville	Holden VE Commodore	Brad Jones Racing		1:10.6527	
19	51	Greg Murphy	Holden VE Commodore	Tasman Motorsport		1:10.6826	
20	16	Paul Dumbrell	Holden VE Commodore	HSV Dealer Team		1:10.7132	
21	12	Andrew Jones	Holden VE Commodore	Brad Jones Racing			1:10.7152
22	9	Shane van Gisbergen	Ford BF Falcon	Stone Brothers Racing			1:10.7168
23	26	Marcus Marshall	Ford BF Falcon	Britek Motorsport			1:10.7407
24	777	Michael Patrizi	Ford BF Falcon	Ford Rising Stars Racing			1:10.7657
25	11	Shane Price	Holden VE Commodore	Jack Daniel's Racing			1:10.7658
26	55	Tony D'Alberto	Holden VE Commodore	Rod Nash Racing			1:10.8161
27	34	Michael Caruso	Holden VE Commodore	Garry Rogers Motorsport			1:10.9775
28	50	Andrew Thompson	Holden VE Commodore	Paul Weel Racing			1:11.0670
29	021	Kayne Scott	Ford BF Falcon	Team Kiwi Racing			1:11.4383

=== Race 1 Results ===
Position	Number	Name	Team	Laps	Time/retired	Grid	Points
1	5	Mark Winterbottom	Ford Performance Racing	42	51:11.6729	1	100
1	88	Jamie Whincup	Team Vodafone	39	47:18.7876	1	100
3	888	Craig Lowndes	Team Vodafone	39	+11.6s	9	86
4	39	Russell Ingall	Supercheap Auto Racing	39	+15.7s	6	80
5	1	Garth Tander	Holden Racing Team	39	+17.8s	12	74
6	4	James Courtney	Stone Brothers Racing	39	+18.2s	11	68
7	15	Rick Kelly	HSV Dealer Team	39	+24.1s	4	64
8	111	Fabian Coulthard	Glenfords Racing	39	+24.5s	5	60
9	9	Shane van Gisbergen	Stone Brothers Racing	39	+30.0s	17	56
10	2	Mark Skaife	Holden Racing Team	39	+31.0s	13	52
11	33	Lee Holdsworth	Garry Rogers Motorsport	39	+31.4s	14	48
12	16	Paul Dumbrell	HSV Dealer Team	39	+31.9s	15	46
13	17	Steven Johnson	Jim Beam Racing	39	+32.2s	16	44
14	14	Cameron McConville	Brad Jones Racing	39	+32.8s	24	42
15	67	Paul Morris	Team Sirromet Wines	39	+38.2s	25	40
16	12	Andrew Jones	Brad Jones Racing	39	+43.9s	18	38
17	7	Todd Kelly	Jack Daniel's Racing	39	+44.2s	8	36
18	3	Jason Richards	Tasman Motorsport	39	+45.1s	10	34
19	11	Shane Price	Jack Daniel's Racing	39	+48.8s	22	32
20	34	Michael Caruso	Garry Rogers Motorsport	39	+52.8s	23	30
21	021	Kayne Scott	Team Kiwi Racing	39	+63.8s	27	28
22	51	Greg Murphy	Tasman Motorsport	39	+64.7s	19	26
23	6	Steven Richards	Ford Performance Racing	39	+64.7s	7	24
24	50	Andrew Thompson	Paul Weel Racing	39	+96.9s	18	22
25	55	Tony D'Alberto	Rod Nash Racing	30	+ 9 laps	20	20
DNF	25	Jason Bright	Britek Motorsport	11		28	
DNF	777	Michael Patrizi	Ford Rising Stars Racing	9		29	
DNF	18	Will Davison	Jim Beam Racing	7	Engine	3	
DNF	26	Marcus Marshall	Britek Motorsport	6		26	

=== Race 2 results ===
Pos	No	Name	Team	Laps	Time/retired	Grid	Points
1	888	Craig Lowndes	Team Vodafone	39	56:19.9593	3	100
2	9	Shane van Gisbergen	Stone Brothers Racing	39	+2.4s	9	92
3	88	Jamie Whincup	Team Vodafone	39	+2.9s	1	86
4	4	James Courtney	Stone Brothers Racing	39	+4.7s	6	80
5	17	Steven Johnson	Jim Beam Racing	39	+4.8s	13	74
6	5	Mark Winterbottom	Ford Performance Racing	39	+6.1s	2	68
7	39	Russell Ingall	Supercheap Auto Racing	39	+8.5s	4	64
8	7	Todd Kelly	Jack Daniel's Racing	39	+9.3s	17	60
9	1	Garth Tander	Holden Racing Team	39	+10.0s	5	56
10	14	Cameron McConville	Brad Jones Racing	39	+13.6s	14	52
11	18	Will Davison	Jim Beam Racing	39	+14.6s	28	48
12	15	Rick Kelly	HSV Dealer Team	39	+16.0s	7	46
13	16	Paul Dumbrell	HSV Dealer Team	39	+19.8s	12	44
14	111	Fabian Coulthard	Glenfords Racing	39	+21.1s	8	42
15	25	Jason Bright	Britek Motorsport	39	+22.0s	26	40
16	6	Steven Richards	Ford Performance Racing	39	+23.1s	23	38
17	12	Andrew Jones	Brad Jones Racing	39	+23.9s	16	36
18	2	Mark Skaife	Holden Racing Team	39	+28.6s	10	34
19	11	Shane Price	Jack Daniel's Racing	39	+29.0s	19	32
20	3	Jason Richards	Tasman Motorsport	39	+59.3s	18	30
21	67	Paul Morris	Team Sirromet Wines	39	+79.7s	16	28
22	33	Lee Holdsworth	Garry Rogers Motorsport	38	+ 1 lap	11	26
23	34	Michael Caruso	Garry Rogers Motorsport	38	+ 1 lap	20	24
24	26	Marcus Marshall	Britek Motorsport	38	+ 1 lap	29	22
25	55	Tony D'Alberto	Rod Nash Racing	38	+ 1 lap	25	20
26	51	Greg Murphy	Tasman Motorsport	38	+ 1 lap	22	18
27	50	Andrew Thompson	Paul Weel Racing	38	+ 1 lap	24	16
28	021	Kayne Scott	Team Kiwi Racing	37	+ 2 laps	21	14
DQ	777	Michael Patrizi	Ford Rising Stars Racing			27	

=== Race 3 results ===
Position	Number	Name	Team	Laps	Time/retired	Grid	Points
1	88	Jamie Whincup	Team Vodafone	39	47:20.7150	3	100
2	5	Mark Winterbottom	Ford Performance Racing	39	+2.1s	6	92
3	4	James Courtney	Stone Brothers Racing	39	+6.8s	4	86
4	9	Shane van Gisbergen	Stone Brothers Racing	39	+18.0s	2	80
5	7	Todd Kelly	Jack Daniel's Racing	39	+18.4s	8	74
6	39	Russell Ingall	Supercheap Auto Racing	39	+18.9s	7	68
7	18	Will Davison	Jim Beam Racing	39	+19.2s	11	64
8	33	Lee Holdsworth	Garry Rogers Motorsport	39	+20.5s	22	60
9	6	Steven Richards	Ford Performance Racing	39	+20.9s	16	56
10	17	Steven Johnson	Jim Beam Racing	39	+31.9s	5	52
11	51	Greg Murphy	Tasman Motorsport	39	+32.2s	26	48
12	1	Garth Tander	Holden Racing Team	39	+32.7s	9	46
13	14	Cameron McConville	Brad Jones Racing	39	+41.1s	10	44
14	25	Jason Bright	Britek Motorsport	39	+53.8s	15	42
15	12	Andrew Jones	Brad Jones Racing	39	+54.9s	17	40
16	3	Jason Richards	Tasman Motorsport	39	+55.5s	20	38
17	15	Rick Kelly	HSV Dealer Team	39	+55.7s	12	36
18	11	Shane Price	Jack Daniel's Racing	39	+56.3s	19	34
19	34	Michael Caruso	Garry Rogers Motorsport	39	+56.8s	23	32
20	50	Andrew Thompson	Paul Weel Racing	39	+67.5s	27	30
21	26	Marcus Marshall	Britek Motorsport	39	+73.0s	24	28
22	2	Mark Skaife	Holden Racing Team	39	+73.4s	18	26
23	021	Kayne Scott	Team Kiwi Racing	39	+73.4s	28	24
24	67	Paul Morris	Team Sirromet Wines	38	+ 1 lap	21	22
25	55	Tony D'Alberto	Rod Nash Racing	38	+ 1 lap	25	20
26	777	Michael Patrizi	Ford Rising Stars Racing	38	+ 1 lap	29	18
27	16	Paul Dumbrell	HSV Dealer Team	36	+ 3 laps	13	16
DNF	111	Fabian Coulthard	Glenfords Racing	21		14	
DNS	888	Craig Lowndes	Team Vodafone	0	Rear Axle	1	

== Standings ==
After round 6 of 14.

Position	Number	Name	Team	Points
1	5	Mark Winterbottom	Ford Performance Racing	1402
2	1	Garth Tander	Holden Racing Team	1344
3	88	Jamie Whincup	Team Vodafone	1276
4	15	Rick Kelly	HSV Dealer Team	1208
5	6	Steven Richards	Ford Performance Racing	1123

== Support categories ==
The 2008 Skycity Triple Crown had four support categories.

Category	Round winner
Formula Ford	Nick Percat (Mygale SJ07A Ford)
V8 Utes	Layton Crambrook (Ford BF Falcon)
Touring Car Masters	John Bowe (Chevrolet Camaro)
Improved Production; Commodore Cup; HQ Holden	Adam Uebergang (Mazda RX-7)
