= 2008 Tasmania Challenge =

2008 Supercar Championship event

2008 Falken Tasmania Challenge
Event Information
- Round 13 of 14 in the 2008 V8 Supercar Championship Series
- Date: 16–18 November 2008
- Location: Launceston, Tasmania
- Venue: Symmons Plains Raceway
- Weather: Fine

Results
Race 1
Distance	50 laps	120 km
Pole position	Garth Tander; Holden Racing Team	51.8338
Winner	Todd Kelly; Perkins Engineering	52:25.8991
Race 2
Distance	50 laps	120 km
Winner	Jamie Whincup; Triple Eight Race Engineering	46:05.2365
Race 3
Distance	50 laps	120 km
Winner	Jamie Whincup; Triple Eight Race Engineering	48:22.3812
Round Results
First	Jamie Whincup; Triple Eight Race Engineering	292 pts
Second	Todd Kelly; Perkins Engineering	272 pts
Third	Craig Lowndes; Triple Eight Race Engineering	252 pts

The 2008 Falken Tasmania Challenge was the thirteenth and penultimate round of the 2008 V8 Supercar season. It was held on the weekend of the 21–23 November at the Symmons Plains Raceway in Tasmania.

== Qualifying ==
Qualifying was held on Saturday 22 November 2008.

== Race 1 ==
Race 1 was held on Saturday 22 November 2008.

== Race 2 ==
Race 2 was held on Sunday 23 November 2008.

== Race 3 ==
Race 3 was held on Sunday 23 November 2008.

== Results ==
=== Qualifying ===
Pos	No	Name	Car	Team	Part 3	Part 2	Part 1
1	1	Garth Tander	Holden VE Commodore	Holden Racing Team	0:51.8338		
2	88	Jamie Whincup	Ford BF Falcon	Team Vodafone	0:52.0438		
3	5	Mark Winterbottom	Ford BF Falcon	Ford Performance Racing	0:52.0479		
4	33	Lee Holdsworth	Holden VE Commodore	Garry Rogers Motorsport	0:52.0708		
5	17	Steven Johnson	Ford BF Falcon	Jim Beam Racing	0:52.0846		
6	4	James Courtney	Ford BF Falcon	Stone Brothers Racing	0:52.1173		
7	15	Rick Kelly	Holden VE Commodore	HSV Dealer Team	0:52.1180		
8	6	Steven Richards	Ford BF Falcon	Ford Performance Racing	0:52.1377		
9	888	Craig Lowndes	Ford BF Falcon	Team Vodafone	0:52.1694		
10	7	Todd Kelly	Holden VE Commodore	Jack Daniel's Racing	0:52.2593		
11	16	Paul Dumbrell	Holden VE Commodore	HSV Dealer Team		0:52.3095	
12	25	Jason Bright	Ford BF Falcon	Britek Motorsport		0:52.4432	
13	14	Cameron McConville	Holden VE Commodore	Brad Jones Racing		0:52.4661	
14	39	Russell Ingall	Holden VE Commodore	Supercheap Auto Racing		0:52.4915	
15	67	Paul Morris	Holden VE Commodore	Supercheap Auto Racing		0:52.5321	
16	9	Shane van Gisbergen	Ford BF Falcon	Stone Brothers Racing		0:52.5472	
17	3	Jason Richards	Holden VE Commodore	Tasman Motorsport		0:52.5900	
18	18	Will Davison	Ford BF Falcon	Jim Beam Racing		0:52.6107	
19	34	Michael Caruso	Holden VE Commodore	Garry Rogers Motorsport		0:52.6349	
20	51	Greg Murphy	Holden VE Commodore	Tasman Motorsport		0:52.6631	
21	2	Mark Skaife	Holden VE Commodore	Holden Racing Team			0:52.7659
22	55	Tony D'Alberto	Holden VE Commodore	Rod Nash Racing			0:52.8247
23	11	Jack Perkins	Holden VE Commodore	Jack Daniel's Racing			0:52.8301
24	12	Andrew Jones	Holden VE Commodore	Brad Jones Racing			0:52.8496
25	777	Michael Patrizi	Ford BF Falcon	Ford Rising Stars Racing			0:52.9292
26	111	Fabian Coulthard	Ford BF Falcon	Glenfords Racing			0:53.0140
27	26	Marcus Marshall	Ford BF Falcon	Britek Motorsport			0:53.0589
28	50	Andrew Thompson	Holden VE Commodore	Paul Weel Racing			0:53.1012
29	021	Daniel Gaunt	Ford BF Falcon	Team Kiwi Racing			0:53.5765

=== Race 1 ===
Pos	No	Driver	Team	Car	Laps	Time/Retired	Grid
1	7	(Australia) Todd Kelly	Perkins Engineering	Holden Commodore (VE)	50		
2	88	(Australia) Jamie Whincup	Triple Eight Race Engineering	Ford Falcon (BF)	50		
3	5	(Australia) Mark Winterbottom	Ford Performance Racing	Ford Falcon (BF)	50		
4	18	(Australia) Will Davison	Dick Johnson Racing	Ford Falcon (BF)	50		
5	9	(New Zealand) Shane van Gisbergen	Stone Brothers Racing	Ford Falcon (BF)	50		
6	888	(Australia) Craig Lowndes	Triple Eight Race Engineering	Ford Falcon (BF)	50		
7	25	(Australia) Jason Bright	Britek Motorsport	Ford Falcon (BF)	50		
8	17	(Australia) Steven Johnson	Dick Johnson Racing	Ford Falcon (BF)	50		
9	111	(New Zealand) Fabian Coulthard	Paul Cruickshank Racing	Ford Falcon (BF)	50		
10	33	(Australia) Lee Holdsworth	Garry Rogers Motorsport	Holden Commodore (VE)	50		
11	3	(New Zealand) Jason Richards	Tasman Motorsport	Holden Commodore (VE)	50		
12	777	(Australia) Michael Patrizi	Ford Rising Stars Racing	Ford Falcon (BF)	50		
13	39	(Australia) Russell Ingall	Paul Morris Motorsport	Holden Commodore (VE)	50		
14	14	(Australia) Cameron McConville	Brad Jones Racing	Holden Commodore (VE)	50		
15	50	(Australia) Andrew Thompson	Paul Weel Racing	Holden Commodore (VE)	50		
16	51	(New Zealand) Greg Murphy	Tasman Motorsport	Holden Commodore (VE)	50		
17	34	(Australia) Michael Caruso	Garry Rogers Motorsport	Holden Commodore (VE)	49	+ 1 lap	
18	26	(Australia) Marcus Marshall	Britek Motorsport	Ford Falcon (BF)	49	+ 1 lap	
19	15	(Australia) Rick Kelly	HSV Dealer Team	Holden Commodore (VE)	49	+ 1 lap	
20	1	(Australia) Garth Tander	Holden Racing Team	Holden Commodore (VE)	49	+ 1 lap	
21	16	(Australia) Paul Dumbrell	HSV Dealer Team	Holden Commodore (VE)	49	+ 1 lap	
22	12	(Australia) Andrew Jones	Brad Jones Racing	Holden Commodore (VE)	49	+ 1 lap	
23	67	(Australia) Paul Morris	Paul Morris Motorsport	Holden Commodore (VE)	49	+ 1 lap	
24	55	(Australia) Tony D'Alberto	Rod Nash Racing	Holden Commodore (VE)	49	+ 1 lap	
25	2	(Australia) Mark Skaife	Holden Racing Team	Holden Commodore (VE)	49	+ 1 lap	
26	021	(New Zealand) Daniel Gaunt	Team Kiwi Racing	Ford Falcon (BF)	48	+ 2 laps	
Ret	11	(Australia) Jack Perkins	Perkins Engineering	Holden Commodore (VE)	12	Retired	
Ret	6	(New Zealand) Steven Richards	Ford Performance Racing	Ford Falcon (BF)	2	Retired	
Ret	4	(Australia) James Courtney	Stone Brothers Racing	Ford Falcon (BF)	2	Retired	
Fastest Lap: Todd Kelly (Perkins Engineering) - 53.1947 on lap 9

=== Race 2 ===
Pos	No	Driver	Team	Car	Laps	Time/Retired	Grid
1	88	(Australia) Jamie Whincup	Triple Eight Race Engineering	Ford Falcon (BF)	50		
2	888	(Australia) Craig Lowndes	Triple Eight Race Engineering	Ford Falcon (BF)	50		
3	7	(Australia) Todd Kelly	Perkins Engineering	Holden Commodore (VE)	50		
4	5	(Australia) Mark Winterbottom	Ford Performance Racing	Ford Falcon (BF)	50		
5	18	(Australia) Will Davison	Dick Johnson Racing	Ford Falcon (BF)	50		
6	17	(Australia) Steven Johnson	Dick Johnson Racing	Ford Falcon (BF)	50		
7	33	(Australia) Lee Holdsworth	Garry Rogers Motorsport	Holden Commodore (VE)	50		
8	1	(Australia) Garth Tander	Holden Racing Team	Holden Commodore (VE)	50		
9	15	(Australia) Rick Kelly	HSV Dealer Team	Holden Commodore (VE)	50		
10	111	(New Zealand) Fabian Coulthard	Paul Cruickshank Racing	Ford Falcon (BF)	50		
11	25	(Australia) Jason Bright	Britek Motorsport	Ford Falcon (BF)	50		
12	51	(New Zealand) Greg Murphy	Tasman Motorsport	Holden Commodore (VE)	50		
13	16	(Australia) Paul Dumbrell	HSV Dealer Team	Holden Commodore (VE)	50		
14	67	(Australia) Paul Morris	Paul Morris Motorsport	Holden Commodore (VE)	50		
15	14	(Australia) Cameron McConville	Brad Jones Racing	Holden Commodore (VE)	50		
16	34	(Australia) Michael Caruso	Garry Rogers Motorsport	Holden Commodore (VE)	50		
17	4	(Australia) James Courtney	Stone Brothers Racing	Ford Falcon (BF)	50		
18	3	(New Zealand) Jason Richards	Tasman Motorsport	Holden Commodore (VE)	50		
19	26	(Australia) Marcus Marshall	Britek Motorsport	Ford Falcon (BF)	50		
20	12	(Australia) Andrew Jones	Brad Jones Racing	Holden Commodore (VE)	50		
21	777	(Australia) Michael Patrizi	Ford Rising Stars Racing	Ford Falcon (BF)	50		
22	11	(Australia) Jack Perkins	Perkins Engineering	Holden Commodore (VE)	50		
23	021	(New Zealand) Daniel Gaunt	Team Kiwi Racing	Ford Falcon (BF)	50		
24	2	(Australia) Mark Skaife	Holden Racing Team	Holden Commodore (VE)	49	+ 1 lap	
25	39	(Australia) Russell Ingall	Paul Morris Motorsport	Holden Commodore (VE)	47	+ 3 laps	
Ret	50	(Australia) Andrew Thompson	Paul Weel Racing	Holden Commodore (VE)	48	Retired	
Ret	6	(New Zealand) Steven Richards	Ford Performance Racing	Ford Falcon (BF)	43	Retired	
Ret	55	(Australia) Tony D'Alberto	Rod Nash Racing	Holden Commodore (VE)	17	Retired	
Ret	9	(New Zealand) Shane van Gisbergen	Stone Brothers Racing	Ford Falcon (BF)	9	Retired	
Fastest Lap: Jamie Whincup (Triple Eight Race Engineering) - 52.9857 on lap 30

=== Race 3 ===
Pos	No	Driver	Team	Car	Laps	Time/Retired	Grid
1	88	(Australia) Jamie Whincup	Triple Eight Race Engineering	Ford Falcon (BF)	50		
2	888	(Australia) Craig Lowndes	Triple Eight Race Engineering	Ford Falcon (BF)	50		
3	7	(Australia) Todd Kelly	Perkins Engineering	Holden Commodore (VE)	50		
4	5	(Australia) Mark Winterbottom	Ford Performance Racing	Ford Falcon (BF)	50		
5	1	(Australia) Garth Tander	Holden Racing Team	Holden Commodore (VE)	50		
6	18	(Australia) Will Davison	Dick Johnson Racing	Ford Falcon (BF)	50		
7	17	(Australia) Steven Johnson	Dick Johnson Racing	Ford Falcon (BF)	50		
8	15	(Australia) Rick Kelly	HSV Dealer Team	Holden Commodore (VE)	50		
9	33	(Australia) Lee Holdsworth	Garry Rogers Motorsport	Holden Commodore (VE)	50		
10	4	(Australia) James Courtney	Stone Brothers Racing	Ford Falcon (BF)	50		
11	111	(New Zealand) Fabian Coulthard	Paul Cruickshank Racing	Ford Falcon (BF)	50		
12	3	(New Zealand) Jason Richards	Tasman Motorsport	Holden Commodore (VE)	50		
13	67	(Australia) Paul Morris	Paul Morris Motorsport	Holden Commodore (VE)	50		
14	51	(New Zealand) Greg Murphy	Tasman Motorsport	Holden Commodore (VE)	50		
15	2	(Australia) Mark Skaife	Holden Racing Team	Holden Commodore (VE)	50		
16	39	(Australia) Russell Ingall	Paul Morris Motorsport	Holden Commodore (VE)	50		
17	6	(New Zealand) Steven Richards	Ford Performance Racing	Ford Falcon (BF)	50		
18	34	(Australia) Michael Caruso	Garry Rogers Motorsport	Holden Commodore (VE)	50		
19	55	(Australia) Tony D'Alberto	Rod Nash Racing	Holden Commodore (VE)	50		
20	16	(Australia) Paul Dumbrell	HSV Dealer Team	Holden Commodore (VE)	50		
21	12	(Australia) Andrew Jones	Brad Jones Racing	Holden Commodore (VE)	50		
22	50	(Australia) Andrew Thompson	Paul Weel Racing	Holden Commodore (VE)	49	+ 1 lap	
23	26	(Australia) Marcus Marshall	Britek Motorsport	Ford Falcon (BF)	49	+ 1 lap	
24	021	(New Zealand) Daniel Gaunt	Team Kiwi Racing	Ford Falcon (BF)	49	+ 1 lap	
25	11	(Australia) Jack Perkins	Perkins Engineering	Holden Commodore (VE)	48	+ 2 laps	
26	777	(Australia) Michael Patrizi	Ford Rising Stars Racing	Ford Falcon (BF)	47	+ 3 laps	
Ret	14	(Australia) Cameron McConville	Brad Jones Racing	Holden Commodore (VE)	36	Retired	
Ret	25	(Australia) Jason Bright	Britek Motorsport	Ford Falcon (BF)	35	Retired	
EXC	9	(New Zealand) Shane van Gisbergen	Stone Brothers Racing	Ford Falcon (BF)		Excluded	
Fastest Lap: Jamie Whincup (Triple Eight Race Engineering) - 52.6742 on lap 47

== Standings ==
After round 13 of 14.

Pos	No	Name	Team	Points
1	88	Jamie Whincup	TeamVodafone	3208
2	5	Mark Winterbottom	Ford Performance Racing	2975
3	1	Garth Tander	Holden Racing Team	2788
4	888	Craig Lowndes	TeamVodafone	2619
5	18	Will Davison	Dick Johnson Racing	2375

== Support categories ==
The 2008 Falken Tasmania Challenge had four support categories.

Category	Round winner
Australian Formula Ford Championship	Nick Percat (Mygale SJ07A Ford)
Aussie Racing Cars	Adam Gowans (Falcon-Yamaha)
Australian Mini Challenge	Paul Stokell (Mini Cooper R56)
Touring Car Masters	Gavin Bullas (Ford Boss Mustang)
