= 2008 City of Ipswich 400 =

2008 Supercar Championship event

(Queensland) 2008 City of Ipswich 400
Event Information
- Round 7 of 14 in the 2008 V8 Supercar Championship Series
- Date: 18–20 July 2008
- Location: Ipswich, Queensland
- Venue: Queensland Raceway
- Weather: Fine

Results
Race 1
| Distance | 38 laps | 120 km |
| Pole position | James Courtney; Stone Brothers Racing | 1:10.7351 |
| Winner | James Courtney; Stone Brothers Racing | 46:30.0751 |
Race 2
| Distance | 38 laps | 120 km |
| Winner | Mark Winterbottom; Ford Performance Racing | 50:13.9041 |
Race 3
| Distance | 38 laps | 120 km |
| Winner | Mark Winterbottom; Ford Performance Racing | 46:35.8306 |
Round Results
| First | Mark Winterbottom; Ford Performance Racing | 292 pts |
| Second | Russell Ingall; Paul Morris Motorsport | 264 pts |
| Third | James Courtney; Stone Brothers Racing | 260 pts |

The 2008 City of Ipswich 400 is the seventh round of the 2008 V8 Supercar season. It was held on the weekend of July 18 to 20 at Queensland Raceway in Ipswich, Queensland.

== Practice ==
Practice featured another opportunity for teams to test endurance co-drivers with Steve Owen ending up the fastest of those drivers in the Jim Beam Racing Falcon, second only in the session to Russell Ingall. Warren Luff was fifth fastest in the second Jim Beam Falcon just ahead of Paul Radisich in the HSV Dealer Team Commodore. Next were Craig Baird (Holden Racing Team) and David Besnard (Stone Brothers Racing). Other co-drivers in the session were Dean Canto (Ford Performance Racing), Glenn Seton (Holden Racing Team), Jason Bargwanna (Rod Nash Racing), Grant Denyer (Ford Rising Stars Racing), Luke Youlden (Ford Performance Racing), Mark Noske (Tasman Motorsport), Jack Perkins (Jack Daniel's Racing), Adam Macrow driving the Team Kiwi Racing Falcon instead of for his enduro team Britek Motorsport, Brad Jones (Brad Jones Racing) and David Reynolds (HSV Dealer Team).

== Qualifying ==
Qualifying was held on Saturday July 19.

== Race 1 ==
Race 1 was held on Saturday July 19.

== Race 2 ==
Race 2 was held on Sunday July 20.

== Race 3 ==
Race 3 was held on Sunday July 20.

== Results ==
Results as follows:

=== Qualifying ===
| Pos | No | Name | Car | Team | Part 3 | Part 2 | Part 1 |
|---|---|---|---|---|---|---|---|
| 1 | 4 | James Courtney | Ford BF Falcon | Stone Brothers Racing | 1:10.7351 | | |
| 2 | 5 | Mark Winterbottom | Ford BF Falcon | Ford Performance Racing | 1:10.7438 | | |
| 3 | 39 | Russell Ingall | Holden VE Commodore | Supercheap Auto Racing | 1:10.8066 | | |
| 4 | 888 | Craig Lowndes | Ford BF Falcon | Team Vodafone | 1:10.8503 | | |
| 5 | 2 | Mark Skaife | Holden VE Commodore | Holden Racing Team | 1:10.8887 | | |
| 6 | 1 | Garth Tander | Holden VE Commodore | Holden Racing Team | 1:10.9096 | | |
| 7 | 18 | Will Davison | Ford BF Falcon | Jim Beam Racing | 1:10.9279 | | |
| 8 | 3 | Jason Richards | Holden VE Commodore | Tasman Motorsport | 1:10.9303 | | |
| 9 | 88 | Jamie Whincup | Ford BF Falcon | Team Vodafone | 1:11.1371 | | |
| 10 | 17 | Steven Johnson | Ford BF Falcon | Jim Beam Racing | excluded | | |
| 11 | 6 | Steven Richards | Ford BF Falcon | Ford Performance Racing | | 1:11.0890 | |
| 12 | 9 | Shane van Gisbergen | Ford BF Falcon | Stone Brothers Racing | | 1:11.1075 | |
| 13 | 33 | Lee Holdsworth | Holden VE Commodore | Garry Rogers Motorsport | | 1:11.1366 | |
| 14 | 15 | Rick Kelly | Holden VE Commodore | HSV Dealer Team | | 1:11.1750 | |
| 15 | 111 | Fabian Coulthard | Ford BF Falcon | Glenfords Racing | | 1:11.2065 | |
| 16 | 12 | Andrew Jones | Holden VE Commodore | Brad Jones Racing | | 1:11.2072 | |
| 17 | 14 | Cameron McConville | Holden VE Commodore | Brad Jones Racing | | 1:11.2386 | |
| 18 | 51 | Greg Murphy | Holden VE Commodore | Tasman Motorsport | | 1:11.2866 | |
| 19 | 67 | Paul Morris | Holden VE Commodore | Supercheap Auto Racing | | 1:11.3793 | |
| 20 | 16 | Paul Dumbrell | Holden VE Commodore | HSV Dealer Team | | excluded | |
| 21 | 55 | Tony D'Alberto | Holden VE Commodore | Rod Nash Racing | | | 1:11.4508 |
| 22 | 34 | Michael Caruso | Holden VE Commodore | Garry Rogers Motorsport | | | 1:11.4822 |
| 23 | 11 | Shane Price | Holden VE Commodore | Jack Daniel's Racing | | | 1:11.5013 |
| 24 | 25 | Jason Bright | Ford BF Falcon | Britek Motorsport | | | 1:11.5110 |
| 25 | 7 | Todd Kelly | Holden VE Commodore | Jack Daniel's Racing | | | 1:11.5171 |
| 26 | 50 | Andrew Thompson | Holden VE Commodore | Paul Weel Racing | | | 1:11.5366 |
| 27 | 26 | Marcus Marshall | Ford BF Falcon | Britek Motorsport | | | 1:11.7892 |
| 28 | 777 | Michael Patrizi | Ford BF Falcon | Ford Rising Stars Racing | | | 1:11.8390 |
| 29 | 021 | Kayne Scott | Ford BF Falcon | Team Kiwi Racing | | | 1:12.8748 |

=== Race 1 results ===
| Pos | No | Name | Team | Laps | Time/Retired | Grid | Points |
|---|---|---|---|---|---|---|---|
| 1 | 4 | James Courtney | Stone Brothers Racing | 38 | 46:30.0751 | 1 | 100 |
| 2 | 5 | Mark Winterbottom | Ford Performance Racing | 38 | +0.2s | 2 | 92 |
| 3 | 39 | Russell Ingall | Supercheap Auto Racing | 38 | +1.4s | 3 | 86 |
| 4 | 1 | Garth Tander | Holden Racing Team | 38 | +5.4s | 6 | 80 |
| 5 | 2 | Mark Skaife | Holden Racing Team | 38 | +6.3s | 5 | 74 |
| 6 | 18 | Will Davison | Jim Beam Racing | 38 | +11.2s | 7 | 68 |
| 7 | 6 | Steven Richards | Ford Performance Racing | 38 | +11.8s | 11 | 64 |
| 8 | 15 | Rick Kelly | HSV Dealer Team | 38 | +13.2s | 14 | 60 |
| 9 | 88 | Jamie Whincup | Team Vodafone | 38 | +13.8s | 9 | 56 |
| 10 | 33 | Lee Holdsworth | Garry Rogers Motorsport | 38 | +14.2s | 13 | 52 |
| 11 | 16 | Paul Dumbrell | HSV Dealer Team | 38 | +15.3s | 20 | 48 |
| 12 | 111 | Fabian Coulthard | Glenfords Racing | 38 | +24.9s | 15 | 46 |
| 13 | 14 | Cameron McConville | Brad Jones Racing | 38 | +28.0s | 17 | 44 |
| 14 | 3 | Jason Richards | Tasman Motorsport | 38 | +30.8s | 8 | 42 |
| 15 | 34 | Michael Caruso | Garry Rogers Motorsport | 38 | +31.4s | 22 | 40 |
| 16 | 17 | Steven Johnson | Jim Beam Racing | 38 | +62.6s | 10 | 38 |
| 17 | 9 | Shane van Gisbergen | Stone Brothers Racing | 38 | +32.6s | 12 | 36 |
| 18 | 25 | Jason Bright | Britek Motorsport | 38 | +33.1s | 24 | 34 |
| 19 | 7 | Todd Kelly | Jack Daniel's Racing | 38 | +34.0s | 25 | 32 |
| 20 | 55 | Tony D'Alberto | Rod Nash Racing | 38 | +39.8s | 21 | 30 |
| 21 | 11 | Shane Price | Jack Daniel's Racing | 38 | +46.2s | 23 | 28 |
| 22 | 12 | Andrew Jones | Brad Jones Racing | 38 | +46.5s | 16 | 26 |
| 23 | 50 | Andrew Thompson | Paul Weel Racing | 38 | +48.4s | 26 | 24 |
| 24 | 51 | Greg Murphy | Tasman Motorsport | 38 | +55.7s | 18 | 22 |
| 25 | 777 | Michael Patrizi | Ford Rising Stars Racing | 38 | +1:05.8s | 28 | 20 |
| 26 | 021 | Kayne Scott | Team Kiwi Racing | 38 | +1:11.0s | 29 | 18 |
| 27 | 67 | Paul Morris | Supercheap Auto Racing | 38 | +1:21.6s | 19 | 16 |
| 28 | 888 | Craig Lowndes | Team Vodafone | 33 | + 5 laps | 4 | 14 |
| DNF | 26 | Marcus Marshall | Britek Motorsport | 27 | | 27 | |

=== Race 2 results ===
| Pos | No | Name | Team | Laps | Time/Retired | Grid | Points |
|---|---|---|---|---|---|---|---|
| 1 | 5 | Mark Winterbottom | Ford Performance Racing | 38 | 50:13.9041 | 2 | 100 |
| 2 | 39 | Russell Ingall | Supercheap Auto Racing | 38 | +2.2s | 3 | 92 |
| 3 | 88 | Jamie Whincup | Team Vodafone | 38 | +7.9s | 9 | 86 |
| 4 | 1 | Garth Tander | Holden Racing Team | 38 | +12.4s | 4 | 80 |
| 5 | 18 | Will Davison | Jim Beam Racing | 38 | +14.2s | 6 | 74 |
| 6 | 4 | James Courtney | Stone Brothers Racing | 38 | +15.3s | 1 | 68 |
| 7 | 6 | Steven Richards | Ford Performance Racing | 38 | +16.6s | 7 | 64 |
| 8 | 111 | Fabian Coulthard | Glenfords Racing | 38 | +20.5s | 12 | 60 |
| 9 | 14 | Cameron McConville | Brad Jones Racing | 38 | +23.5s | 13 | 56 |
| 10 | 2 | Mark Skaife | Holden Racing Team | 38 | +28.8s | 5 | 52 |
| 11 | 16 | Paul Dumbrell | HSV Dealer Team | 38 | +29.4s | 11 | 48 |
| 12 | 888 | Craig Lowndes | Team Vodafone | 38 | +34.5s | 28 | 46 |
| 13 | 7 | Todd Kelly | Jack Daniel's Racing | 38 | +35.1s | 19 | 44 |
| 14 | 3 | Jason Richards | Tasman Motorsport | 38 | +35.4s | 14 | 42 |
| 15 | 67 | Paul Morris | Supercheap Auto Racing | 38 | +36.2s | 27 | 40 |
| 16 | 34 | Michael Caruso | Garry Rogers Motorsport | 38 | +36.6s | 15 | 38 |
| 17 | 17 | Steven Johnson | Jim Beam Racing | 38 | +38.3s | 16 | 36 |
| 18 | 33 | Lee Holdsworth | Garry Rogers Motorsport | 38 | +38.7s | 10 | 34 |
| 19 | 11 | Shane Price | Jack Daniel's Racing | 38 | +39.9s | 21 | 32 |
| 20 | 51 | Greg Murphy | Tasman Motorsport | 38 | +42.8s | 24 | 30 |
| 21 | 9 | Shane van Gisbergen | Stone Brothers Racing | 38 | +47.2s | 17 | 28 |
| 22 | 55 | Tony D'Alberto | Rod Nash Racing | 38 | +47.6s | 20 | 26 |
| 23 | 50 | Andrew Thompson | Paul Weel Racing | 38 | +1:02.1s | 23 | 24 |
| 24 | 12 | Andrew Jones | Brad Jones Racing | 34 | + 4 laps | 22 | 22 |
| 25 | 777 | Michael Patrizi | Ford Rising Stars Racing | 33 | + 5 laps | 25 | 20 |
| DNF | 15 | Rick Kelly | HSV Dealer Team | 9 | | 8 | |
| DNF | 26 | Marcus Marshall | Britek Motorsport | 8 | | 29 | |
| DNF | 021 | Kayne Scott | Team Kiwi Racing | 7 | | 26 | |
| DNF | 25 | Jason Bright | Britek Motorsport | 2 | | 18 | |

=== Race 3 results ===
| Pos | No | Name | Team | Laps | Time/Retired | Grid | Points |
|---|---|---|---|---|---|---|---|
| 1 | 5 | Mark Winterbottom | Ford Performance Racing | 38 | 46:35.8306 | 1 | 100 |
| 2 | 4 | James Courtney | Stone Brothers Racing | 38 | +5.5s | 6 | 92 |
| 3 | 39 | Russell Ingall | Supercheap Auto Racing | 38 | +9.8s | 2 | 86 |
| 4 | 1 | Garth Tander | Holden Racing Team | 38 | +12.6s | 4 | 80 |
| 5 | 18 | Will Davison | Jim Beam Racing | 38 | +12.8s | 5 | 74 |
| 6 | 88 | Jamie Whincup | Team Vodafone | 38 | +13.3s | 3 | 68 |
| 7 | 888 | Craig Lowndes | Team Vodafone | 38 | +18.8s | 12 | 64 |
| 8 | 111 | Fabian Coulthard | Glenfords Racing | 38 | +20.1s | 8 | 60 |
| 9 | 2 | Mark Skaife | Holden Racing Team | 38 | +23.2s | 10 | 56 |
| 10 | 33 | Lee Holdsworth | Garry Rogers Motorsport | 38 | +23.6s | 18 | 52 |
| 11 | 6 | Steven Richards | Ford Performance Racing | 38 | +24.1s | 7 | 48 |
| 12 | 7 | Todd Kelly | Jack Daniel's Racing | 38 | +34.9s | 13 | 46 |
| 13 | 15 | Rick Kelly | HSV Dealer Team | 38 | +36.0s | 26 | 44 |
| 14 | 14 | Cameron McConville | Brad Jones Racing | 38 | +36.3s | 9 | 42 |
| 15 | 17 | Steven Johnson | Jim Beam Racing | 38 | +38.7s | 17 | 40 |
| 16 | 34 | Michael Caruso | Garry Rogers Motorsport | 38 | +39.9s | 16 | 38 |
| 17 | 9 | Shane van Gisbergen | Stone Brothers Racing | 38 | +43.3s | 21 | 36 |
| 18 | 12 | Andrew Jones | Brad Jones Racing | 38 | +44.0s | 24 | 34 |
| 19 | 51 | Greg Murphy | Tasman Motorsport | 38 | +46.7s | 20 | 32 |
| 20 | 16 | Paul Dumbrell | HSV Dealer Team | 38 | +47.2s | 11 | 30 |
| 21 | 11 | Shane Price | Jack Daniel's Racing | 38 | +47.5s | 19 | 28 |
| 22 | 3 | Jason Richards | Tasman Motorsport | 38 | +47.7s | 14 | 26 |
| 23 | 777 | Michael Patrizi | Ford Rising Stars Racing | 38 | +59.5 | 25 | 24 |
| 24 | 021 | Kayne Scott | Team Kiwi Racing | 38 | +1:09.0s | 28 | 22 |
| 25 | 25 | Jason Bright | Britek Motorsport | 37 | + 1 lap | 29 | 20 |
| 26 | 55 | Tony D'Alberto | Rod Nash Racing | 36 | + 2 laps | 22 | 18 |
| DNF | 67 | Paul Morris | Supercheap Auto Racing | 10 | | 15 | |
| DNF | 26 | Marcus Marshall | Britek Motorsport | 9 | | 27 | |
| DNF | 50 | Andrew Thompson | Paul Weel Racing | 7 | | 23 | |

== Standings ==
After round 7 of 14.

| Pos | No | Name | Team | Points |
|---|---|---|---|---|
| 1 | 5 | Mark Winterbottom | Ford Performance Racing | 1694 |
| 2 | 1 | Garth Tander | Holden Racing Team | 1572 |
| 3 | 88 | Jamie Whincup | Team Vodafone | 1486 |
| 4 | 15 | Rick Kelly | HSV Dealer Team | 1312 |
| 5 | 6 | Steven Richards | Ford Performance Racing | 1299 |

== Support categories ==
The 2008 City of Ipswich 400 had five support categories.

| Category | Round winner |
|---|---|
| Fujitsu V8 Supercar Series | Dean Canto (Ford BA Falcon) |
| Carrera Cup | Craig Baird (Porsche 997 GT3 Cup) |
| Formula Ford | Nick Percat (Mygale SJ07A Ford) |
| V8 Utes | Jack Elsegood (Ford BF Falcon) |
| Mazda MX-5 Cup | Brendan Whitaker (Mazda MX-5 NA Turbo) |
