= 2008 V8 Supercar Challenge =

Eleventh round of the 2008 V8 Supercar season

Coordinates: 27°59′23″S 153°25′40″E

(Queensland) 2008 The Coffee Club V8 Supercar Challenge
Event Information
- Round 11 of 14 in the 2008 V8 Supercar Championship Series
- Date: 24–26 October 2008
- Location: Surfers Paradise, Queensland
- Venue: Surfers Paradise Street Circuit
- Weather: Fine

Results
Race 1
Distance	27 laps	120 km
Pole position	Jamie Whincup; Triple Eight Race Engineering	1:49.1828
Winner	Jamie Whincup; Triple Eight Race Engineering	52:27.0448
Race 2
Distance	27 laps	120 km
Winner	Jamie Whincup; Triple Eight Race Engineering	56:26.3034
Race 3
Distance	27 laps	120 km
Winner	Jamie Whincup; Triple Eight Race Engineering	58:15.8607
Round Results
First	Jamie Whincup; Triple Eight Race Engineering	300 pts
Second	Garth Tander; Holden Racing Team	276 pts
Third	Mark Winterbottom; Ford Performance Racing	258 pts

The 2008 The Coffee Club V8 Supercar Challenge was the eleventh round of the 2008 V8 Supercar season. It was held on the weekend of the 24 to 26 October at the Surfers Paradise Street Circuit in Queensland.

== Qualifying ==
Qualifying rounds for the race were held on Friday the 24 October 2008.

== Race 1 ==
Race 1 was held on Saturday the 25 October 2008.

== Race 2 ==
Race 2 was held on Sunday the 26 October 2008.

== Race 3 ==
Race 3 was held on Sunday the 26 October 2008.

== Results ==
=== Qualifying ===
Pos	No	Name	Car	Team	Part 3	Part 2	Part 1
1	5	Mark Winterbottom	Ford BF Falcon	Ford Performance Racing	1:22.9727		
2	88	Jamie Whincup	Ford BF Falcon	Team Vodafone	1:23.3699		
3	18	Will Davison	Ford BF Falcon	Jim Beam Racing	1:23.3950		
4	1	Garth Tander	Holden VE Commodore	Holden Racing Team	1:23.4144		
5	33	Lee Holdsworth	Holden VE Commodore	Garry Rogers Motorsport	1:23.4243		
6	6	Steven Richards	Ford BF Falcon	Ford Performance Racing	1:23.4651		
7	34	Michael Caruso	Holden VE Commodore	Garry Rogers Motorsport	1:23.5305		
8	15	Rick Kelly	Holden VE Commodore	HSV Dealer Team	1:23.6947		
9	11	Shane Price	Holden VE Commodore	Jack Daniel's Racing	1:23.8438		
10	3	Jason Richards	Holden VE Commodore	Tasman Motorsport	1:23.8788		
11	7	Todd Kelly	Holden VE Commodore	Jack Daniel's Racing		1:23.6998	
12	2	Mark Skaife	Holden VE Commodore	Holden Racing Team		1:23.7186	
13	16	Paul Dumbrell	Holden VE Commodore	HSV Dealer Team		1:23.7846	
14	888	Craig Lowndes	Ford BF Falcon	Team Vodafone		1:23.7971	
15	39	Russell Ingall	Holden VE Commodore	Supercheap Auto Racing		1:23.8608	
16	111	Fabian Coulthard	Ford BF Falcon	Glenfords Racing		1:23.8836	
17	4	James Courtney	Ford BF Falcon	Stone Brothers Racing		1:23.9262	
18	12	Andrew Jones	Holden VE Commodore	Brad Jones Racing		1:24.0339	
19	50	Andrew Thompson	Holden VE Commodore	Paul Weel Racing		1:24.1115	
20	25	Jason Bright	Ford BF Falcon	Britek Motorsport		excluded	
21	67	Paul Morris	Holden VE Commodore	Supercheap Auto Racing			1:24.2463
22	14	Cameron McConville	Holden VE Commodore	Brad Jones Racing			1:24.2650
23	17	Steven Johnson	Ford BF Falcon	Jim Beam Racing			1:24.2676
24	9	Shane Van Gisbergen	Ford BF Falcon	Stone Brothers Racing			1:24.3978
25	51	Greg Murphy	Holden VE Commodore	Tasman Motorsport			1:24.6103
26	55	Tony D'Alberto	Holden VE Commodore	Rod Nash Racing			1:24.6713
27	26	Marcus Marshall	Ford BF Falcon	Britek Motorsport			1:24.7798
28	777	Michael Patrizi	Ford BF Falcon	Ford Rising Stars Racing			1:25.1079
29	021	Chris Pither	Ford BF Falcon	Team Kiwi Racing			1:26.3345

=== Race 1 Results ===
Pos	No	Name	Team	Laps	Time/Retired	Grid	Points
1	5	Mark Winterbottom	Ford Performance Racing	42	51:11.6729	1	100
1	88	Jamie Whincup	Team Vodafone	39	47:18.7876	1	100
3	888	Craig Lowndes	Team Vodafone	39	+11.6s	9	86
4	39	Russell Ingall	Supercheap Auto Racing	39	+15.7s	6	80
5	1	Garth Tander	Holden Racing Team	39	+17.8s	12	74
6	4	James Courtney	Stone Brothers Racing	39	+18.2s	11	68
7	15	Rick Kelly	HSV Dealer Team	39	+24.1s	4	64
8	111	Fabian Coulthard	Glenfords Racing	39	+24.5s	5	60
9	9	Shane Van Gisbergen	Stone Brothers Racing	39	+30.0s	17	56
10	2	Mark Skaife	Holden Racing Team	39	+31.0s	13	52
11	33	Lee Holdsworth	Garry Rogers Motorsport	39	+31.4s	14	48
12	16	Paul Dumbrell	HSV Dealer Team	39	+31.9s	15	46
13	17	Steven Johnson	Jim Beam Racing	39	+32.2s	16	44
14	14	Cameron McConville	Brad Jones Racing	39	+32.8s	24	42
15	67	Paul Morris	Team Sirromet Wines	39	+38.2s	25	40
16	12	Andrew Jones	Brad Jones Racing	39	+43.9s	18	38
17	7	Todd Kelly	Jack Daniel's Racing	39	+44.2s	8	36
18	3	Jason Richards	Tasman Motorsport	39	+45.1s	10	34
19	11	Shane Price	Jack Daniel's Racing	39	+48.8s	22	32
20	34	Michael Caruso	Garry Rogers Motorsport	39	+52.8s	23	30
21	021	Kayne Scott	Team Kiwi Racing	39	+63.8s	27	28
22	51	Greg Murphy	Tasman Motorsport	39	+64.7s	19	26
23	6	Steven Richards	Ford Performance Racing	39	+64.7s	7	24
24	50	Andrew Thompson	Paul Weel Racing	39	+96.9s	18	22
25	55	Tony D'Alberto	Rod Nash Racing	30	+ 9 laps	20	20
DNF	25	Jason Bright	Britek Motorsport	11		28	
DNF	777	Michael Patrizi	Ford Rising Stars Racing	9		29	
DNF	18	Will Davison	Jim Beam Racing	7	Engine	3	
DNF	26	Marcus Marshall	Britek Motorsport	6		26	

=== Race 2 Results ===
Pos	No	Name	Team	Laps	Time/Retired	Grid	Points
1	888	Craig Lowndes	Team Vodafone	39	56:19.9593	3	100
2	9	Shane Van Gisbergen	Stone Brothers Racing	39	+2.4s	9	92
3	88	Jamie Whincup	Team Vodafone	39	+2.9s	1	86
4	4	James Courtney	Stone Brothers Racing	39	+4.7s	6	80
5	17	Steven Johnson	Jim Beam Racing	39	+4.8s	13	74
6	5	Mark Winterbottom	Ford Performance Racing	39	+6.1s	2	68
7	39	Russell Ingall	Supercheap Auto Racing	39	+8.5s	4	64
8	7	Todd Kelly	Jack Daniel's Racing	39	+9.3s	17	60
9	1	Garth Tander	Holden Racing Team	39	+10.0s	5	56
10	14	Cameron McConville	Brad Jones Racing	39	+13.6s	14	52
11	18	Will Davison	Jim Beam Racing	39	+14.6s	28	48
12	15	Rick Kelly	HSV Dealer Team	39	+16.0s	7	46
13	16	Paul Dumbrell	HSV Dealer Team	39	+19.8s	12	44
14	111	Fabian Coulthard	Glenfords Racing	39	+21.1s	8	42
15	25	Jason Bright	Britek Motorsport	39	+22.0s	26	40
16	6	Steven Richards	Ford Performance Racing	39	+23.1s	23	38
17	12	Andrew Jones	Brad Jones Racing	39	+23.9s	16	36
18	2	Mark Skaife	Holden Racing Team	39	+28.6s	10	34
19	11	Shane Price	Jack Daniel's Racing	39	+29.0s	19	32
20	3	Jason Richards	Tasman Motorsport	39	+59.3s	18	30
21	67	Paul Morris	Team Sirromet Wines	39	+79.7s	16	28
22	33	Lee Holdsworth	Garry Rogers Motorsport	38	+ 1 lap	11	26
23	34	Michael Caruso	Garry Rogers Motorsport	38	+ 1 lap	20	24
24	26	Marcus Marshall	Britek Motorsport	38	+ 1 lap	29	22
25	55	Tony D'Alberto	Rod Nash Racing	38	+ 1 lap	25	20
26	51	Greg Murphy	Tasman Motorsport	38	+ 1 lap	22	18
27	50	Andrew Thompson	Paul Weel Racing	38	+ 1 lap	24	16
28	021	Kayne Scott	Team Kiwi Racing	37	+ 2 laps	21	14
DQ	777	Michael Patrizi	Ford Rising Stars Racing			27	

=== Race 3 Results ===
Pos	No	Name	Team	Laps	Time/Retired	Grid	Points
1	88	Jamie Whincup	Team Vodafone	39	47:20.7150	3	100
2	5	Mark Winterbottom	Ford Performance Racing	39	+2.1s	6	92
3	4	James Courtney	Stone Brothers Racing	39	+6.8s	4	86
4	9	Shane Van Gisbergen	Stone Brothers Racing	39	+18.0s	2	80
5	7	Todd Kelly	Jack Daniel's Racing	39	+18.4s	8	74
6	39	Russell Ingall	Supercheap Auto Racing	39	+18.9s	7	68
7	18	Will Davison	Jim Beam Racing	39	+19.2s	11	64
8	33	Lee Holdsworth	Garry Rogers Motorsport	39	+20.5s	22	60
9	6	Steven Richards	Ford Performance Racing	39	+20.9s	16	56
10	17	Steven Johnson	Jim Beam Racing	39	+31.9s	5	52
11	51	Greg Murphy	Tasman Motorsport	39	+32.2s	26	48
12	1	Garth Tander	Holden Racing Team	39	+32.7s	9	46
13	14	Cameron McConville	Brad Jones Racing	39	+41.1s	10	44
14	25	Jason Bright	Britek Motorsport	39	+53.8s	15	42
15	12	Andrew Jones	Brad Jones Racing	39	+54.9s	17	40
16	3	Jason Richards	Tasman Motorsport	39	+55.5s	20	38
17	15	Rick Kelly	HSV Dealer Team	39	+55.7s	12	36
18	11	Shane Price	Jack Daniel's Racing	39	+56.3s	19	34
19	34	Michael Caruso	Garry Rogers Motorsport	39	+56.8s	23	32
20	50	Andrew Thompson	Paul Weel Racing	39	+67.5s	27	30
21	26	Marcus Marshall	Britek Motorsport	39	+73.0s	24	28
22	2	Mark Skaife	Holden Racing Team	39	+73.4s	18	26
23	021	Kayne Scott	Team Kiwi Racing	39	+73.4s	28	24
24	67	Paul Morris	Team Sirromet Wines	38	+ 1 lap	21	22
25	55	Tony D'Alberto	Rod Nash Racing	38	+ 1 lap	25	20
26	777	Michael Patrizi	Ford Rising Stars Racing	38	+ 1 lap	29	18
27	16	Paul Dumbrell	HSV Dealer Team	36	+ 3 laps	13	16
DNF	111	Fabian Coulthard	Glenfords Racing	21		14	
DNS	888	Craig Lowndes	Team Vodafone	0	Rear Axle	1	

== Standings ==
After round 8 of 14.

Pos	No	Name	Team	Points
1	1	Garth Tander	Holden Racing Team	1844
2	5	Mark Winterbottom	Ford Performance Racing	1832
3	88	Jamie Whincup	Team Vodafone	1758
4	15	Rick Kelly	HSV Dealer Team	1506
5	18	Will Davison	Jim Beam Racing	1426

== Other categories ==
The 2008 Nikon Indy 300 had five categories (including V8 Supercars) of racing.

Category	Round winner
Indy Racing League	Ryan Briscoe (Dallara IR8 Honda)
Formula 3	John Martin (Dallara F307 Mercedes-Benz)
Australian Carrera Cup	James Moffat (Porsche 997 GT3 Cup)
Aussie Racing Cars	Paul Morris (Commodore-Yamaha)
