= 2008 V8 Supercar season =

Seasons
- ← 2007 2009 →

The 2008 V8 Supercar season was the twelfth season in which V8 Supercars contested the premier Australian touring car racing series. It was the 49th year of touring car racing in Australia since the first running of the Australian Touring Car Championship, known today as the V8 Supercar Championship Series, and of the fore-runner of the present day Bathurst 1000, the Armstrong 500.

The season began on 21 February at the Clipsal 500 on the streets of Adelaide and finished on 7 December at Oran Park Raceway. 2008 featured the twelfth V8 Supercars Championship Series, consisting of 14 rounds covering all states and the Northern Territory of Australia as well as rounds in New Zealand and Bahrain. It also featured a non-championship event supporting the 2008 Australian Grand Prix. It included the ninth second tier Development Series, this year referred to as the Fujitsu V8 Supercar Series. All bar one of the seven rounds were held as a support category for the V8 Supercar Championship Series. For the first time a third tier series was run, known as the Shannons V8 Touring Car National Series. Its four rounds were held as part of the Shannons Nationals Motor Racing Championships.

== Race calendar ==
Race title	Circuit	City / state	Date	Series	Winner	Team	Report
(Victoria (state)) Victorian Official Test Day	Winton Motor Raceway	Benalla, Victoria	12 Feb	Test	Garth Tander*	Holden Racing Team	
Queensland Official Test Day	Queensland Raceway	Ipswich, Queensland	14 Feb	Test	James Courtney*	Stone Brothers Racing	
(South Australia) Clipsal 500	Adelaide Street Circuit	Adelaide, South Australia	21–24 Feb	VSC 1	Jamie Whincup	Triple Eight Race Engineering	report
(South Australia) Clipsal 500	Adelaide Street Circuit	Adelaide, South Australia	21–24 Feb	FVS 1	Steve Owen	Loadsman Racing Team	
(New South Wales) Eastern Creek	Eastern Creek Raceway	Sydney, New South Wales	7–9 Mar	VSC 2	Will Davison	Jim Beam Racing	report
(Victoria (state)) Sprint Gas V8 Supercars Manufacturers Challenge	Albert Park	Melbourne, Victoria	13–16 Mar	NC	Garth Tander	Holden Racing Team	report
(New South Wales) Goulburn	Wakefield Park	Goulburn, New South Wales	4–6 Apr	FVS 2	Tim Slade	Slade Speed	
(New Zealand) Hamilton 400	Hamilton Street Circuit	Hamilton, New Zealand	18–20 Apr	VSC 3	Garth Tander	Holden Racing Team	report
(Western Australia) BigPond 400	Barbagallo Raceway	Perth, Western Australia	9–11 May	VSC 4	Mark Winterbottom	Ford Performance Racing	report
(South Australia) Mallala	Mallala Motor Sport Park	Adelaide, South Australia	17–18 May	STCS 1	Adam Wallis	Warrin Mining	
(Victoria (state)) Midas 400	Sandown Raceway	Melbourne, Victoria	7–9 Jun	VSC 5	Jamie Whincup	Triple Eight Race Engineering	report
(Victoria (state)) Midas 400	Sandown Raceway	Melbourne, Victoria	7–9 Jun	FVS 3	Steve Owen	Loadsman Racing Team	
(Northern Territory) Skycity Triple Crown	Hidden Valley Raceway	Darwin, Northern Territory	4–6 Jul	VSC 6	Steven Richards	Ford Performance Racing	report
(New South Wales) Eastern Creek	Eastern Creek Raceway	Sydney, New South Wales	12–13 Jul	STCS 2	Chris Smerdon	Challenge Motorsport	
(Queensland) City of Ipswich 400	Queensland Raceway	Ipswich, Queensland	18–20 Jul	VSC 7	Mark Winterbottom	Ford Performance Racing	report
(Queensland) City of Ipswich 400	Queensland Raceway	Ipswich, Queensland	18–20 Jul	FVS 4	Dean Canto	Howard Racing	
(Victoria (state)) Winton	Winton Motor Raceway	Benalla, Victoria	1–3 Aug	VSC 8	Garth Tander	Holden Racing Team	report
(Victoria (state)) Winton	Winton Motor Raceway	Benalla, Victoria	1–3 Aug	FVS 5	Steve Owen	Loadsman Racing Team	
(Victoria (state)) Phillip Island	Phillip Island Grand Prix Circuit	Phillip Island, Victoria	9–10 Aug	STCS 3	Chris Smerdon	Challenge Motorsport	
(Victoria (state)) L&H 500	Phillip Island Grand Prix Circuit	Phillip Island, Victoria	12–14 Sep	VSC 9	Garth Tander; Mark Skaife	Holden Racing Team	report
(New South Wales) Supercheap Auto Bathurst 1000	Mount Panorama Circuit	Bathurst, New South Wales	9–12 Oct	VSC 10	Jamie Whincup; Craig Lowndes	Triple Eight Race Engineering	report
(New South Wales) Supercheap Auto Bathurst 1000	Mount Panorama Circuit	Bathurst, New South Wales	9–12 Oct	FVS 6	Dean Canto	Howard Racing	
(Queensland) The Coffee Club V8 Supercar Challenge	Surfers Paradise Street Circuit	Surfers Paradise, Queensland	23–26 Oct	VSC 11	Jamie Whincup	Triple Eight Race Engineering	report
(Bahrain) Gulf Air Desert 400	Bahrain International Circuit	Manama, Bahrain	6–8 Nov	VSC 12	Jamie Whincup	Triple Eight Race Engineeringe	report
Falken Tasmania Challenge	Symmons Plains Raceway	Launceston, Tasmania	21–23 Nov	VSC 13	Jamie Whincup	Triple Eight Race Engineering	report
(Victoria (state)) Sandown	Sandown Raceway	Melbourne, Victoria	29–30 Nov	STCS 4	Chris Smerdon	Challenge Motorsport	
(New South Wales) NRMA Motoring & Services Grand Finale	Oran Park Raceway	Sydney, New South Wales	4–7 Dec	VSC 14	Garth Tander	Holden Racing Team	report
(New South Wales) NRMA Motoring & Services Grand Finale	Oran Park Raceway	Sydney, New South Wales	4–7 Dec	FVS 7	Jack Perkins	Independent Race Cars Australia	

* – fastest lap of official pre-season test days

- VSC – V8 Supercar Championship Series
- FVS – Fujitsu V8 Supercar Series
- STCS – Shannons V8 Touring Car National Series
- NC – Non-championship event
