= 2008 V8 Supercars Winton round =

2008 Supercar Championship event

(Victoria (state)) 2008 Winton V8 Supercar round
Event Information
- Round 8 of 14 in the 2008 V8 Supercar Championship Series
- Date: 1–3 August 2008
- Location: Benalla, Victoria
- Venue: Winton Motor Raceway
- Weather: Fine

Results
Race 1
Distance	40 laps	120 km
Pole position	Mark Winterbottom; Ford Performance Racing	1:22.9727
Winner	Jamie Whincup; Triple Eight Race Engineering	57:39.1073
Race 2
Distance	40 laps	120 km
Winner	Will Davison; Dick Johnson Racing	1:01:51.4044
Race 3
Distance	40 laps	120 km
Winner	Garth Tander; Holden Racing Team	59:00.7895
Round Results
First	Garth Tander; Holden Racing Team	272 pts
Second	Jamie Whincup; Triple Eight Race Engineering	272 pts
Third	Will Davison; Dick Johnson Racing	272 pts

The eighth round of the V8 Supercar Championship was held at Winton Motor Raceway in Benalla, Victoria, on the weekend of August 1 to August 3 of 2008.

== Qualifying ==
Qualifying was held on Saturday August 2. Chris Pither rejoined the series driving the Team Kiwi Racing Falcon, replacing Kayne Scott as the team continued to struggle from one drama to the next. Mark Winterbottom was too quick for the field, securing pole position.

== Race 1 ==
Race 1 was held on Saturday August 2. Mark Winterbottom started from pole position and lead early but a puncture caused by debris dumped the series points leader down the field as he limped the car around, keeping the car on track until the compulsory pit stop window opened.

Will Davison emerged from the pit stop cycle in the race lead but was over taken by Jamie Whincup while Davison was vulnerable with cold tyres. Whincup went on to take his fifth race win of the year. Davison ran home for second with Garth Tander first Holden in third. Fourth place was Jason Richards best of season for both him and the Tasman Motorsports team. Steven Richards was fifth with Lee Holdsworth finishing sixth. Todd Kelly was well up in seventh with ninth an excellent result for Michael Caruso. Winterbottom recovered to 21st position.

After racing was completed Holdsworth was penalised 32 seconds after contact with Rick Kelly had sent the HSV Dealer Team driver off the circuit, dropping him to effectively 18th position.

== Race 2 ==
Race 2 was held on Sunday August 3. Contact between Jason Richards and Steven Richards resulted in Jason Richards spinning in front of the field at just the second corner of the race. Russell Ingall was put out of the race after contact with Steven Richards damaged the front end of his Commodore as Richards moved right to avoid. Michael Caruso was jammed against the wall by the crashing Jason Richards. Mark Skaife was punted by another car into a wall on the inside as he tried to avoid the developing accident. The final victim was Steven Richards a broken rear axle sidelining the Falcon late in the race. The car was given a patch repair and sent out to finish the race to get some points.

Will Davison again emerged from the pitstop cycle in the lead, this time with enough of a buffer over the second place that he raced on to take his second V8 Supercar race win. Hard-charging Mark Winterbottom blitzed the field to climb into second position after the pitstops. Garth Tander was again third ahead of teammates Jamie Whincup and Craig Lowndes with Rick Kelly sixth.

Lee Holdsworth recovered from his penalty for a fine seventh position. He had been the centre of chaos on the grid after he was sent out by his team to start sixth after the Garry Rogers Motorsport team protested the validity of the overnight stewards meeting that had penalised him. He did take up 18th grid spot however and fought his way back through the field. Jason Bright finished eighth in a season best result for the struggling Britek Motorsport team.

Shane van Gisbergen received a drive-through penalty for crossing the painted 'blend line' at pit lane exit where the pit lane blends back into the racetrack. He would later receive a second drive-through after he made a significant short-cut of the circuit after spearing off. Greg Murphy had a huge spin after contact with Michael Patrizi for which the young Ford Rising Stars Racing driver was given a drive-through penalty.

== Race 3 ==
Race 3 was held on Sunday August 3. Mark Winterbottom got the jump off the start for Race 3, and led Will Davison and Garth Tander into turn one. However Tander jumped into second place by passing Davison at turn 3 on the opening lap. At the same time as this was happening, race leader Winterbottom locked a front tyre and ran off the circuit onto the grass. Upon re-entering the track he made contact with Todd Kelly, and spun off at turn four, this time into the sand trap. This brought the safety car out on lap one to clear the stuck Ford Performance Racing car of Winterbottom, with Tander becoming the new race leader and Davison in second. It turned out to be a disastrous race for the Ford Performance Racing team, with Steven Richards also involved in an accident, resulting in a bent steering arm and subsequent retirement from the race.

The order changed at the front of the field after the compulsory pitstops were complete. With Garth Tander choosing to stay out longer before taking his pitstop, Will Davison and Jamie Whincup pitted, with Whincup performing his stop one lap beforehand. When leaving the pitlane, Davison surrendered second position to Whincup, who was already on warmer tyres. James Courtney was one of the last of the front-runners to take his pitstop, however a drama with the left rear tyre not been put on properly during the stop resulted in the wheel falling off the car only a few metres from leaving his pitbox. This ruined Courtney's race three hopes, with the team having to use a manual jack to lift the car off the ground to get it back to the pit box.

After his penalty earlier in the day, Lee Holdsworth recovered well, coming out in third position after pitting. Tander continued to lead the rest of the race, taking his fifth race victory for the season. The race win also bumped Tander back up into the lead position in the championship.

== Results ==
Results as follows:

=== Qualifying ===
Pos	No	Name	Car	Team	Part 3	Part 2	Part 1
1	5	Mark Winterbottom	Ford BF Falcon	Ford Performance Racing	1:22.9727		
2	88	Jamie Whincup	Ford BF Falcon	Team Vodafone	1:23.3699		
3	18	Will Davison	Ford BF Falcon	Jim Beam Racing	1:23.3950		
4	1	Garth Tander	Holden VE Commodore	Holden Racing Team	1:23.4144		
5	33	Lee Holdsworth	Holden VE Commodore	Garry Rogers Motorsport	1:23.4243		
6	6	Steven Richards	Ford BF Falcon	Ford Performance Racing	1:23.4651		
7	34	Michael Caruso	Holden VE Commodore	Garry Rogers Motorsport	1:23.5305		
8	15	Rick Kelly	Holden VE Commodore	HSV Dealer Team	1:23.6947		
9	11	Shane Price	Holden VE Commodore	Jack Daniel's Racing	1:23.8438		
10	3	Jason Richards	Holden VE Commodore	Tasman Motorsport	1:23.8788		
11	7	Todd Kelly	Holden VE Commodore	Jack Daniel's Racing		1:23.6998	
12	2	Mark Skaife	Holden VE Commodore	Holden Racing Team		1:23.7186	
13	16	Paul Dumbrell	Holden VE Commodore	HSV Dealer Team		1:23.7846	
14	888	Craig Lowndes	Ford BF Falcon	Team Vodafone		1:23.7971	
15	39	Russell Ingall	Holden VE Commodore	Supercheap Auto Racing		1:23.8608	
16	111	Fabian Coulthard	Ford BF Falcon	Glenfords Racing		1:23.8836	
17	4	James Courtney	Ford BF Falcon	Stone Brothers Racing		1:23.9262	
18	12	Andrew Jones	Holden VE Commodore	Brad Jones Racing		1:24.0339	
19	50	Andrew Thompson	Holden VE Commodore	Paul Weel Racing		1:24.1115	
20	25	Jason Bright	Ford BF Falcon	Britek Motorsport		excluded	
21	67	Paul Morris	Holden VE Commodore	Supercheap Auto Racing			1:24.2463
22	14	Cameron McConville	Holden VE Commodore	Brad Jones Racing			1:24.2650
23	17	Steven Johnson	Ford BF Falcon	Jim Beam Racing			1:24.2676
24	9	Shane van Gisbergen	Ford BF Falcon	Stone Brothers Racing			1:24.3978
25	51	Greg Murphy	Holden VE Commodore	Tasman Motorsport			1:24.6103
26	55	Tony D'Alberto	Holden VE Commodore	Rod Nash Racing			1:24.6713
27	26	Marcus Marshall	Ford BF Falcon	Britek Motorsport			1:24.7798
28	777	Michael Patrizi	Ford BF Falcon	Ford Rising Stars Racing			1:25.1079
29	021	Chris Pither	Ford BF Falcon	Team Kiwi Racing			1:26.3345

=== Race 1 Results ===
Pos	No	Name	Team	Laps	Time/Retired	Grid	Points
1	5	Mark Winterbottom	Ford Performance Racing	42	51:11.6729	1	100
1	88	Jamie Whincup	Team Vodafone	39	47:18.7876	1	100
3	888	Craig Lowndes	Team Vodafone	39	+11.6s	9	86
4	39	Russell Ingall	Supercheap Auto Racing	39	+15.7s	6	80
5	1	Garth Tander	Holden Racing Team	39	+17.8s	12	74
6	4	James Courtney	Stone Brothers Racing	39	+18.2s	11	68
7	15	Rick Kelly	HSV Dealer Team	39	+24.1s	4	64
8	111	Fabian Coulthard	Glenfords Racing	39	+24.5s	5	60
9	9	Shane van Gisbergen	Stone Brothers Racing	39	+30.0s	17	56
10	2	Mark Skaife	Holden Racing Team	39	+31.0s	13	52
11	33	Lee Holdsworth	Garry Rogers Motorsport	39	+31.4s	14	48
12	16	Paul Dumbrell	HSV Dealer Team	39	+31.9s	15	46
13	17	Steven Johnson	Jim Beam Racing	39	+32.2s	16	44
14	14	Cameron McConville	Brad Jones Racing	39	+32.8s	24	42
15	67	Paul Morris	Team Sirromet Wines	39	+38.2s	25	40
16	12	Andrew Jones	Brad Jones Racing	39	+43.9s	18	38
17	7	Todd Kelly	Jack Daniel's Racing	39	+44.2s	8	36
18	3	Jason Richards	Tasman Motorsport	39	+45.1s	10	34
19	11	Shane Price	Jack Daniel's Racing	39	+48.8s	22	32
20	34	Michael Caruso	Garry Rogers Motorsport	39	+52.8s	23	30
21	021	Kayne Scott	Team Kiwi Racing	39	+63.8s	27	28
22	51	Greg Murphy	Tasman Motorsport	39	+64.7s	19	26
23	6	Steven Richards	Ford Performance Racing	39	+64.7s	7	24
24	50	Andrew Thompson	Paul Weel Racing	39	+96.9s	18	22
25	55	Tony D'Alberto	Rod Nash Racing	30	+ 9 laps	20	20
DNF	25	Jason Bright	Britek Motorsport	11		28	
DNF	777	Michael Patrizi	Ford Rising Stars Racing	9		29	
DNF	18	Will Davison	Jim Beam Racing	7	Engine	3	
DNF	26	Marcus Marshall	Britek Motorsport	6		26	

=== Race 2 Results ===
Pos	No	Name	Team	Laps	Time/Retired	Grid	Points
1	888	Craig Lowndes	Team Vodafone	39	56:19.9593	3	100
2	9	Shane van Gisbergen	Stone Brothers Racing	39	+2.4s	9	92
3	88	Jamie Whincup	Team Vodafone	39	+2.9s	1	86
4	4	James Courtney	Stone Brothers Racing	39	+4.7s	6	80
5	17	Steven Johnson	Jim Beam Racing	39	+4.8s	13	74
6	5	Mark Winterbottom	Ford Performance Racing	39	+6.1s	2	68
7	39	Russell Ingall	Supercheap Auto Racing	39	+8.5s	4	64
8	7	Todd Kelly	Jack Daniel's Racing	39	+9.3s	17	60
9	1	Garth Tander	Holden Racing Team	39	+10.0s	5	56
10	14	Cameron McConville	Brad Jones Racing	39	+13.6s	14	52
11	18	Will Davison	Jim Beam Racing	39	+14.6s	28	48
12	15	Rick Kelly	HSV Dealer Team	39	+16.0s	7	46
13	16	Paul Dumbrell	HSV Dealer Team	39	+19.8s	12	44
14	111	Fabian Coulthard	Glenfords Racing	39	+21.1s	8	42
15	25	Jason Bright	Britek Motorsport	39	+22.0s	26	40
16	6	Steven Richards	Ford Performance Racing	39	+23.1s	23	38
17	12	Andrew Jones	Brad Jones Racing	39	+23.9s	16	36
18	2	Mark Skaife	Holden Racing Team	39	+28.6s	10	34
19	11	Shane Price	Jack Daniel's Racing	39	+29.0s	19	32
20	3	Jason Richards	Tasman Motorsport	39	+59.3s	18	30
21	67	Paul Morris	Team Sirromet Wines	39	+79.7s	16	28
22	33	Lee Holdsworth	Garry Rogers Motorsport	38	+ 1 lap	11	26
23	34	Michael Caruso	Garry Rogers Motorsport	38	+ 1 lap	20	24
24	26	Marcus Marshall	Britek Motorsport	38	+ 1 lap	29	22
25	55	Tony D'Alberto	Rod Nash Racing	38	+ 1 lap	25	20
26	51	Greg Murphy	Tasman Motorsport	38	+ 1 lap	22	18
27	50	Andrew Thompson	Paul Weel Racing	38	+ 1 lap	24	16
28	021	Kayne Scott	Team Kiwi Racing	37	+ 2 laps	21	14
DSQ	777	Michael Patrizi	Ford Rising Stars Racing			27	

=== Race 3 Results ===
Pos	No	Name	Team	Laps	Time/Retired	Grid	Points
1	88	Jamie Whincup	Team Vodafone	39	47:20.7150	3	100
2	5	Mark Winterbottom	Ford Performance Racing	39	+2.1s	6	92
3	4	James Courtney	Stone Brothers Racing	39	+6.8s	4	86
4	9	Shane van Gisbergen	Stone Brothers Racing	39	+18.0s	2	80
5	7	Todd Kelly	Jack Daniel's Racing	39	+18.4s	8	74
6	39	Russell Ingall	Supercheap Auto Racing	39	+18.9s	7	68
7	18	Will Davison	Jim Beam Racing	39	+19.2s	11	64
8	33	Lee Holdsworth	Garry Rogers Motorsport	39	+20.5s	22	60
9	6	Steven Richards	Ford Performance Racing	39	+20.9s	16	56
10	17	Steven Johnson	Jim Beam Racing	39	+31.9s	5	52
11	51	Greg Murphy	Tasman Motorsport	39	+32.2s	26	48
12	1	Garth Tander	Holden Racing Team	39	+32.7s	9	46
13	14	Cameron McConville	Brad Jones Racing	39	+41.1s	10	44
14	25	Jason Bright	Britek Motorsport	39	+53.8s	15	42
15	12	Andrew Jones	Brad Jones Racing	39	+54.9s	17	40
16	3	Jason Richards	Tasman Motorsport	39	+55.5s	20	38
17	15	Rick Kelly	HSV Dealer Team	39	+55.7s	12	36
18	11	Shane Price	Jack Daniel's Racing	39	+56.3s	19	34
19	34	Michael Caruso	Garry Rogers Motorsport	39	+56.8s	23	32
20	50	Andrew Thompson	Paul Weel Racing	39	+67.5s	27	30
21	26	Marcus Marshall	Britek Motorsport	39	+73.0s	24	28
22	2	Mark Skaife	Holden Racing Team	39	+73.4s	18	26
23	021	Kayne Scott	Team Kiwi Racing	39	+73.4s	28	24
24	67	Paul Morris	Team Sirromet Wines	38	+ 1 lap	21	22
25	55	Tony D'Alberto	Rod Nash Racing	38	+ 1 lap	25	20
26	777	Michael Patrizi	Ford Rising Stars Racing	38	+ 1 lap	29	18
27	16	Paul Dumbrell	HSV Dealer Team	36	+ 3 laps	13	16
DNF	111	Fabian Coulthard	Glenfords Racing	21		14	
DNS	888	Craig Lowndes	Team Vodafone	0	Rear Axle	1	

== Standings ==
After round 8 of 14.

Pos	No	Name	Team	Points
1	1	Garth Tander	Holden Racing Team	1844
2	5	Mark Winterbottom	Ford Performance Racing	1832
3	88	Jamie Whincup	Team Vodafone	1758
4	15	Rick Kelly	HSV Dealer Team	1506
5	18	Will Davison	Jim Beam Racing	1426

== Support categories ==
The 2008 Winton round of the V8 Supercar Championship had four support categories.

Category	Round winner
Fujitsu V8 Supercar Series	Steve Owen (Holden VZ Commodore)
V8 Utes	Gary Baxter (Holden VE SS)
Touring Car Masters	Gavin Bullas (Ford Mustang)
Aussie Racing Cars	Ben McCashney (Falcon-Yamaha)
