= 2008 V8 Supercars Manufacturers Challenge =

(Victoria (state)) 2008 V8 Supercars Manufacturers Challenge
Event Information
- Date: 13–16 March 2008
- Location: Melbourne, Victoria
- Venue: Melbourne Grand Prix Circuit
- Weather: Fine

Results
Race 1
Distance	13 laps	70 km
Pole position	Garth Tander; Holden Racing Team	1:58.2337
Winner	Garth Tander; Holden Racing Team	27:54.4393
Race 2
Distance	15 laps	80 km
Winner	Garth Tander; Holden Racing Team	37:45.8517
Race 3
Distance	16 laps	85 km
Winner	Garth Tander; Holden Racing Team	34:44.3442
Round Results
First	Garth Tander; Holden Racing Team	300 pts
Second	Will Davison; Dick Johnson Racing	276 pts
Third	Rick Kelly; HSV Dealer Team	252 pts

The 2008 Sprint Gas V8 Supercars Manufacturers Challenge was the third meeting of the 2008 V8 Supercar season. It was held on the weekend of 13 to 16 March at Albert Park Street Circuit, in the inner suburbs of Melbourne, the capital of Victoria. The meeting was a non-championship affair, conducted under a unique Holden vs Ford format. It was the lead support category for the 2008 Australian Grand Prix.

== Qualifying ==
Qualifying was held on Thursday 13 March. Mark Skaife was fastest as the Holden Racing Team continued its resurgence. Steven Richards shook off his car destroying crash at Eastern Creek to be second fastest ahead of Jason Richards in the Tasman Motorsport Commodore. The end of qualifying was nervous with the first top ten shootout of the season to be held the following day and while Russell Ingall scraped into the top ten, the unique Ford vs Holden rules for this event which demanded five of each manufacturer in the top ten saw Ingall, as the sixth Holden, relegated in favour of the fifth Ford, Steven Johnson. Michael Patrizi qualified 28th on the debut of both himself and his Ford Rising Stars Racing in the main game series.

== Top Ten shootout ==
The top ten shootout, the first to be held in 2008, was held on Friday 14 March. Garth Tander kept the Holden Racing Team atop the timesheets, picking off pole position, holding off a motivated Craig Lowndes for the position. Steven Richards was third fastest, but would be relegated to fourth on the grid as the Ford vs Holden format stated that the grid would be formed in alternating manufacturer order ahead of outright pace, meaning fifth fastest qualifying Rick Kelly would start third as the second fastest Holden.

== Race 1 ==
Race 1 was held on Friday 12 March immediately after the shootout.

== Race 2 ==
Race 2 was held on Saturday 13 March.

== Race 3 ==
Race 3 was held on Sunday 14 March.

== Results ==
Results as follows:

=== Qualifying ===
Pos	No	Name	Car	Team	Shootout	Qualifying
1	1	Garth Tander	Holden VE Commodore	Holden Racing Team	1:58.2337	1:58.8971
2	888	Craig Lowndes	Ford BF Falcon	Triple Eight Race Engineering	1:58.4953	1:59.2023
3	6	Steven Richards	Ford BF Falcon	Ford Performance Racing	1:58.7328	1:58.6621
4	18	Will Davison	Ford BF Falcon	Dick Johnson Racing	1:58.9980	1:58.7249
5	15	Rick Kelly	Holden VE Commodore	HSV Dealer Team	1:59.0476	1:59.1387
6	3	Jason Richards	Holden VE Commodore	Tasman Motorsport	1:59.1864	1:58.7134
7	5	Mark Winterbottom	Ford BF Falcon	Ford Performance Racing	1:59.4490	1:59.1371
8	2	Mark Skaife	Holden VE Commodore	Holden Racing Team	1:59.7825	1:58.5086
9	14	Cameron McConville	Holden VE Commodore	Brad Jones Racing	1:59.9566	1:59.1964
10	17	Steven Johnson	Ford BF Falcon	Dick Johnson Racing	2:00.2959	1:59.2450
11	39	Russell Ingall	Holden VE Commodore	Paul Morris Motorsport		1:59.2442
12	88	Jamie Whincup	Ford BF Falcon	Triple Eight Race Engineering		1:59.2552
13	4	James Courtney	Ford BF Falcon	Stone Brothers Racing		1:59.2988
14	9	Shane van Gisbergen	Ford BF Falcon	Stone Brothers Racing		1:59.3754
15	25	Jason Bright	Ford BF Falcon	Britek Motorsport		1:59.4549
16	12	Andrew Jones	Holden VE Commodore	Brad Jones Racing		1:59.4939
17	111	Fabian Coulthard	Ford BF Falcon	Paul Cruickshank Racing		1:59.5730
18	33	Lee Holdsworth	Holden VE Commodore	Garry Rogers Motorsport		1:59.6715
19	51	Greg Murphy	Holden VE Commodore	Tasman Motorsport		1:59.6851
20	16	Paul Dumbrell	Holden VE Commodore	HSV Dealer Team		1:59.8272
21	7	Todd Kelly	Holden VE Commodore	Perkins Engineering		1:59.9082
22	55	Tony D'Alberto	Holden VE Commodore	Rod Nash Racing		2:00.0081
23	67	Paul Morris	Holden VE Commodore	Paul Morris Motorsport		2:00.1834
24	50	Andrew Thompson	Holden VE Commodore	Paul Weel Racing		2:00.3897
25	34	Michael Caruso	Holden VE Commodore	Garry Rogers Motorsport		2:00.6498
26	11	Shane Price	Holden VE Commodore	Perkins Engineering		2:00.8066
27	26	Marcus Marshall	Ford BF Falcon	Britek Motorsport		2:01.0328
28	777	Michael Patrizi	Ford BF Falcon	Ford Rising Stars Racing		2:01.7018
29	021	Kayne Scott	Ford BF Falcon	Team Kiwi Racing		2:02.1051

=== Race 1 results ===
Pos	No	Name	Team	Laps	Time/Retired	Grid	Points
1	1	Garth Tander	Holden Racing Team	13	27:54.4393	1	100
2	18	Will Davison	Dick Johnson Racing	13	+2.6s	6	92
3	15	Rick Kelly	HSV Dealer Team	13	+2.9s	3	86
4	2	Mark Skaife	Holden Racing Team	13	+3.3s	7	80
5	5	Mark Winterbottom	Ford Performance Racing	13	+3.7s	8	74
6	88	Jamie Whincup	Triple Eight Race Engineering	13	+6.4s	12	68
7	17	Steven Johnson	Dick Johnson Racing	13	+7.0s	10	64
8	14	Cameron McConville	Brad Jones Racing	13	+7.4s	9	60
9	3	Jason Richards	Tasman Motorsport	13	+7.8s	5	56
10	51	Greg Murphy	Tasman Motorsport	13	+8.1s	17	52
11	33	Lee Holdsworth	Garry Rogers Motorsport	13	+8.7s	15	48
12	14	Andrew Jones	Brad Jones Racing	13	+8.8s	13	46
13	888	Craig Lowndes	Triple Eight Race Engineering	13	+9.0s	2	44
14	39	Russell Ingall	Paul Morris Motorsport	13	+9.4s	11	42
15	9	Shane van Gisbergen	Stone Brothers Racing	13	+9.5s	16	40
16	7	Todd Kelly	Perkins Engineering	13	+10.2s	21	38
17	11	Shane Price	Perkins Engineering	13	+11.5s	29	36
18	55	Tony D'Alberto	Rod Nash Racing	13	+12.0s	23	34
19	16	Paul Dumbrell	HSV Dealer Team	13	+12.2s	19	32
20	111	Fabian Coulthard	Paul Cruickshank Racing	13	+12.4s	20	30
21	777	Michael Patrizi	Ford Rising Stars Racing	13	+12.8s	24	28
22	50	Andrew Thompson	Paul Weel Racing	13	+13.8s	27	26
23	25	Jason Bright	Britek Motorsport	13	+14.7s	18	24
24	4	James Courtney	Stone Brothers Racing	13	+14.9s	14	22
25	34	Michael Caruso	Garry Rogers Motorsport	13	+15.4s	28	20
26	26	Marcus Marshall	Britek Motorsport	13	+22.1s	22	18
DNF	67	Paul Morris	Team Sirromet Wines	6		25	
DNF	021	Kayne Scott	Team Kiwi Racing	5		26	
DNF	6	Steven Richards	Ford Performance Racing	0		4	

=== Race 2 results ===
Pos	No	Name	Team	Laps	Time/Retired	Grid	Points
1	1	Garth Tander	Holden Racing Team	15	37:45.8517	1	100
2	18	Will Davison	Dick Johnson Racing	15	+3.3s	2	92
3	5	Mark Winterbottom	Ford Performance Racing	15	+3.5s	4	86
4	15	Rick Kelly	HSV Dealer Team	15	+4.4s	3	80
5	88	Jamie Whincup	Triple Eight Race Engineering	15	+4.6s	6	74
6	2	Mark Skaife	Holden Racing Team	15	+5.3s	5	68
7	14	Andrew Jones	Brad Jones Racing	15	+8.7s	15	64
8	39	Russell Ingall	Paul Morris Motorsport	15	+8.9s	17	60
9	33	Lee Holdsworth	Garry Rogers Motorsport	15	+25.1s	13	56
10	14	Cameron McConville	Brad Jones Racing	15	+10.1s	7	52
11	3	Jason Richards	Tasman Motorsport	15	+10.5s	9	48
12	6	Steven Richards	Ford Performance Racing	15	+11.3s	26	46
13	7	Todd Kelly	Perkins Engineering	15	+11.8s	19	44
14	4	James Courtney	Stone Brothers Racing	15	+12.2s	14	42
15	17	Steven Johnson	Dick Johnson Racing	15	+13.5s	8	40
16	25	Jason Bright	Britek Motorsport	15	+20.9s	18	38
17	111	Fabian Coulthard	Paul Cruickshank Racing	15	+21.9s	14	36
18	34	Michael Caruso	Garry Rogers Motorsport	15	+22.3s	28	34
19	55	Tony D'Alberto	Rod Nash Racing	15	+22.7s	23	32
20	67	Paul Morris	Team Sirromet Wines	15	+22.9s	29	30
21	9	Shane van Gisbergen	Stone Brothers Racing	15	+23.1s	12	28
22	26	Marcus Marshall	Britek Motorsport	15	+25.7s	22	26
23	021	Kayne Scott	Team Kiwi Racing	15	+26.1s	24	24
24	50	Andrew Thompson	Paul Weel Racing	15	+26.6s	27	22
DNF	51	Greg Murphy	Tasman Motorsport	14		11	
DNF	777	Michael Patrizi	Ford Rising Stars Racing	13		16	
DNF	888	Craig Lowndes	Triple Eight Race Engineering	12		10	
DNF	16	Paul Dumbrell	HSV Dealer Team	7		25	
DNF	11	Shane Price	Perkins Engineering	1		21	

=== Race 3 results ===
Pos	No	Name	Team	Laps	Time/Retired	Grid	Points	Event points
1	1	Garth Tander	Holden Racing Team	16	34:44.3442	1	100	
2	18	Will Davison	Dick Johnson Racing	16	+2.5s	2	92	
3	15	Rick Kelly	HSV Dealer Team	16	+4.4s	3	86	
4	2	Mark Skaife	Holden Racing Team	16	+10.4s	5	80	
5	39	Russell Ingall	Paul Morris Motorsport	16	+12.0s	9	74	
6	6	Steven Richards	Ford Performance Racing	16	+13.3s	8	68	
7	4	James Courtney	Stone Brothers Racing	16	+16.0s	10	64	
8	14	Cameron McConville	Brad Jones Racing	16	+17.2s	13	60	
9	17	Steven Johnson	Dick Johnson Racing	16	+20.4s	12	56	
10	888	Craig Lowndes	Triple Eight Race Engineering	16	+20.7s	26	52	
11	111	Fabian Coulthard	Paul Cruickshank Racing	16	+8.6s	16	48	
12	33	Lee Holdsworth	Garry Rogers Motorsport	16	+22.3s	11	46	
13	3	Jason Richards	Tasman Motorsport	16	+26.2s	15	44	
14	25	Jason Bright	Britek Motorsport	16	+28.1s	14	42	
15	55	Tony D'Alberto	Rod Nash Racing	16	+28.6s	21	40	
16	51	Greg Murphy	Tasman Motorsport	16	+29.8s	27	38	
17	34	Michael Caruso	Garry Rogers Motorsport	16	+30.7s	19	36	
18	7	Todd Kelly	Perkins Engineering	16	+35.8s	17	34	
19	9	Shane van Gisbergen	Stone Brothers Racing	16	+41.6s	18	32	
20	777	Michael Patrizi	Ford Rising Stars Racing	16	+42.0s	24	30	
21	11	Shane Price	Perkins Engineering	16	+43.3s	28	28	
22	26	Marcus Marshall	Britek Motorsport	16	+45.6s	20	26	
23	50	Andrew Thompson	Paul Weel Racing	16	+47.9s	25	24	
24	021	Kayne Scott	Team Kiwi Racing	16	+54.1s	22	22	
25	14	Andrew Jones	Brad Jones Racing	16	+1:22.3s	7	20	
DNF	67	Paul Morris	Team Sirromet Wines	6		23		
DNF	88	Jamie Whincup	Triple Eight Race Engineering	4		6		
DNF	5	Mark Winterbottom	Ford Performance Racing	1		4		
DNS	16	Paul Dumbrell	HSV Dealer Team					

== See also ==
2008 Australian Grand Prix
