= 2008 V8 Supercars Grand Finale =

2008 Supercar Championship event

(New South Wales) 2008 V8 Supercars Grand Finale
Event Information
- Round 14 of 14 in the 2008 V8 Supercar Championship Series
- Date: 4–7 December 2008
- Location: Sydney, New South Wales
- Venue: Oran Park Raceway
- Weather: Fine

Results
Race 1
Distance	46 laps	120 km
Pole position	Garth Tander; Holden Racing Team	1:09.4562
Winner	Jamie Whincup; Triple Eight Race Engineering	56:12.2480
Race 2
Distance	46 laps	120 km
Winner	Garth Tander; Holden Racing Team	57:04.0467
Race 3
Distance	46 laps	120 km
Winner	Rick Kelly; HSV Dealer Team	57:03.6766
Round Results
First	Garth Tander; Holden Racing Team	260 pts
Second	Craig Lowndes; Triple Eight Race Engineering	252 pts
Third	Rick Kelly; HSV Dealer Team	236 pts

The 2008 V8 Supercars Grand Finale (known for naming rights reasons as the 2008 NRMA Motoring + Services Grand Finale) was the fourteenth and final round of the 2008 V8 Supercar Championship Series. It was held on the weekend of the 4 to 7 December at the Oran Park Raceway in New South Wales.

Entering the round as the favourite, Jamie Whincup secured his first V8 Supercar championship after claiming victory in the first race of the weekend. Race two, as well as overall round honours, were won by Garth Tander while Rick Kelly secured victory in race three in front of a capacity crowd.

This event marked the final appearance of Oran Park Raceway on the V8 Supercar calendar with the Sydney venue being demolished 13 months later to make way for housing development. It was also the final solo championship appearance for five-time Australian Touring Car champion Mark Skaife who retired from full-time driving duties this weekend.

== Background ==
The event was held on the weekend of 4 to 7 December 2008. It was the 34th ATCC/V8 Supercar event to be held at Oran Park Raceway and consisted of three 120 km races. All races necessitated compulsory pitstops for fuel and tyres.

At the conclusion of the Surfers Paradise event, Mark Skaife announced his intention to retire from full-time driving at the conclusion of the 2008 season. This therefore would mark the final appearance of the five-time ATCC/V8 Supercar champion.

Jamie Whincup entered the weekend as the championship favourite, only needing to score 68 points out of a possible 300 on offer for the weekend.

=== Entry list ===
There were 29 drivers entered into the event. It featured mixture of vehicle models - thirteen BF Ford Falcon's and sixteen VE Commodore's. No alterations were made to the entry list from the previous round in Tasmania.

Steven Richards was entered under the number 120 for this round to mark Dunlop Tyres' 120-year anniversary

== Race report ==
=== Qualifying ===
Garth Tander claimed pole position by four tenths of a second over nearest competitor, Craig Lowndes.

Pos	No	Name	Team	Car	Part 3	Part 2	Part 1
1	1	(Australia) Garth Tander	Holden Racing Team	Holden Commodore (VE)	1:09.4562		
2	888	(Australia) Craig Lowndes	Triple Eight Race Engineering	Ford Falcon (BF)	1:09.8709		
3	88	(Australia) Jamie Whincup	Triple Eight Race Engineering	Ford Falcon (BF)	1:09.9161		
4	5	(Australia) Mark Winterbottom	Ford Performance Racing	Ford Falcon (BF)	1:09.9620		
5	39	(Australia) Russell Ingall	Paul Morris Motorsport	Holden Commodore (VE)	1:10.1421		
6	120	(New Zealand) Steven Richards	Ford Performance Racing	Ford Falcon (BF)	1:10.1594		
7	4	(Australia) James Courtney	Stone Brothers Racing	Ford Falcon (BF)	1:10.2049		
8	7	(Australia) Todd Kelly	Perkins Engineering	Holden Commodore (VE)	1:10.3222		
9	33	(Australia) Lee Holdsworth	Garry Rogers Motorsport	Holden Commodore (VE)	1:10.4076		
10	18	(Australia) Will Davison	Dick Johnson Racing	Ford Falcon (BF)	1:10.4959		
11	15	(Australia) Rick Kelly	HSV Dealer Team	Holden Commodore (VE)		1:10.3320	
12	14	(Australia) Cameron McConville	Brad Jones Racing	Holden Commodore (VE)		1:10.3983	
13	25	(Australia) Jason Bright	Britek Motorsport	Ford Falcon (BF)		1:10.4329	
14	3	(New Zealand) Jason Richards	Tasman Motorsport	Holden Commodore (VE)		1:10.4703	
15	9	(New Zealand) Shane van Gisbergen	Stone Brothers Racing	Ford Falcon (BF)		1:10.5647	
16	2	(Australia) Mark Skaife	Holden Racing Team	Holden Commodore (VE)		1:10.6061	
17	17	(Australia) Steven Johnson	Dick Johnson Racing	Ford Falcon (BF)		1:10.6901	
18	34	(Australia) Michael Caruso	Garry Rogers Motorsport	Holden Commodore (VE)		1:10.6941	
19	50	(Australia) Andrew Thompson	Paul Weel Racing	Holden Commodore (VE)		1:10.7593	
20	55	(Australia) Tony D'Alberto	Rod Nash Racing	Holden Commodore (VE)		1:10.8179	
21	67	(Australia) Paul Morris	Paul Morris Motorsport	Holden Commodore (VE)			1:11.3725
22	11	(Australia) Jack Perkins	Perkins Engineering	Holden Commodore (VE)			1:11.4414
23	51	(New Zealand) Greg Murphy	Tasman Motorsport	Holden Commodore (VE)			1:11.4995
24	111	(New Zealand) Fabian Coulthard	Paul Cruickshank Racing	Ford Falcon (BF)			1:11.5220
25	777	(Australia) Michael Patrizi	Ford Rising Stars Racing	Ford Falcon (BF)			1:11.6063
26	26	(Australia) Marcus Marshall	Britek Motorsport	Ford Falcon (BF)			1:11.6299
27	12	(Australia) Andrew Jones	Brad Jones Racing	Holden Commodore (VE)			1:11.7497
28	021	(New Zealand) Daniel Gaunt	Team Kiwi Racing	Ford Falcon (BF)			1:12.7317
29	16	(Australia) Paul Dumbrell	HSV Dealer Team	Holden Commodore (VE)			1:12.8345

=== Race 1 ===
Pos	No	Driver	Team	Car	Laps	Time/Retired	Grid
1	88	(Australia) Jamie Whincup	Triple Eight Race Engineering	Ford Falcon (BF)	46		
2	888	(Australia) Craig Lowndes	Triple Eight Race Engineering	Ford Falcon (BF)	46		
3	39	(Australia) Russell Ingall	Paul Morris Motorsport	Holden Commodore (VE)	46		
4	120	(New Zealand) Steven Richards	Ford Performance Racing	Ford Falcon (BF)	46		
5	4	(Australia) James Courtney	Stone Brothers Racing	Ford Falcon (BF)	46		
6	1	(Australia) Garth Tander	Holden Racing Team	Holden Commodore (VE)	46		
7	7	(Australia) Todd Kelly	Perkins Engineering	Holden Commodore (VE)	46		
8	34	(Australia) Michael Caruso	Garry Rogers Motorsport	Holden Commodore (VE)	46		
9	15	(Australia) Rick Kelly	HSV Dealer Team	Holden Commodore (VE)	46		
10	18	(Australia) Will Davison	Dick Johnson Racing	Ford Falcon (BF)	46		
11	14	(Australia) Cameron McConville	Brad Jones Racing	Holden Commodore (VE)	46		
12	33	(Australia) Lee Holdsworth	Garry Rogers Motorsport	Holden Commodore (VE)	46		
13	25	(Australia) Jason Bright	Britek Motorsport	Ford Falcon (BF)	46		
14	67	(Australia) Paul Morris	Paul Morris Motorsport	Holden Commodore (VE)	46		
15	17	(Australia) Steven Johnson	Dick Johnson Racing	Ford Falcon (BF)	46		
16	3	(New Zealand) Jason Richards	Tasman Motorsport	Holden Commodore (VE)	46		
17	11	(Australia) Jack Perkins	Perkins Engineering	Holden Commodore (VE)	46		
18	111	(New Zealand) Fabian Coulthard	Paul Cruickshank Racing	Ford Falcon (BF)	46		
19	16	(Australia) Paul Dumbrell	HSV Dealer Team	Holden Commodore (VE)	46		
20	26	(Australia) Marcus Marshall	Britek Motorsport	Ford Falcon (BF)	45	+ 1 lap	
21	51	(New Zealand) Greg Murphy	Tasman Motorsport	Holden Commodore (VE)	45	+ 1 lap	
22	021	(New Zealand) Daniel Gaunt	Team Kiwi Racing	Ford Falcon (BF)	45	+ 1 lap	
23	5	(Australia) Mark Winterbottom	Ford Performance Racing	Ford Falcon (BF)	41	+ 4 laps	
Ret	12	(Australia) Andrew Jones	Brad Jones Racing	Holden Commodore (VE)	37	Retired	
Ret	50	(Australia) Andrew Thompson	Paul Weel Racing	Holden Commodore (VE)	25	Retired	
Ret	55	(Australia) Tony D'Alberto	Rod Nash Racing	Holden Commodore (VE)	22	Retired	
Ret	9	(New Zealand) Shane van Gisbergen	Stone Brothers Racing	Ford Falcon (BF)	11	Retired	
Ret	2	(Australia) Mark Skaife	Holden Racing Team	Holden Commodore (VE)	10	Retired	
Ret	777	(Australia) Michael Patrizi	Ford Rising Stars Racing	Ford Falcon (BF)	8	Retired	
Fastest Lap: Russell Ingall (Paul Morris Motorsport) - 1:10.6998 on lap 8

=== Race 2 ===
Pos	No	Driver	Team	Car	Laps	Time/Retired	Grid
1	1	(Australia) Garth Tander	Holden Racing Team	Holden Commodore (VE)	46		
2	39	(Australia) Russell Ingall	Paul Morris Motorsport	Holden Commodore (VE)	46		
3	120	(New Zealand) Steven Richards	Ford Performance Racing	Ford Falcon (BF)	46		
4	15	(Australia) Rick Kelly	HSV Dealer Team	Holden Commodore (VE)	46		
5	888	(Australia) Craig Lowndes	Triple Eight Race Engineering	Ford Falcon (BF)	46		
6	4	(Australia) James Courtney	Stone Brothers Racing	Ford Falcon (BF)	46		
7	25	(Australia) Jason Bright	Britek Motorsport	Ford Falcon (BF)	46		
8	7	(Australia) Todd Kelly	Perkins Engineering	Holden Commodore (VE)	46		
9	17	(Australia) Steven Johnson	Dick Johnson Racing	Ford Falcon (BF)	46		
10	111	(New Zealand) Fabian Coulthard	Paul Cruickshank Racing	Ford Falcon (BF)	46		
11	34	(Australia) Michael Caruso	Garry Rogers Motorsport	Holden Commodore (VE)	46		
12	5	(Australia) Mark Winterbottom	Ford Performance Racing	Ford Falcon (BF)	46		
13	9	(New Zealand) Shane van Gisbergen	Stone Brothers Racing	Ford Falcon (BF)	46		
14	67	(Australia) Paul Morris	Paul Morris Motorsport	Holden Commodore (VE)	46		
15	18	(Australia) Will Davison	Dick Johnson Racing	Ford Falcon (BF)	46		
16	16	(Australia) Paul Dumbrell	HSV Dealer Team	Holden Commodore (VE)	46		
17	51	(New Zealand) Greg Murphy	Tasman Motorsport	Holden Commodore (VE)	46		
18	3	(New Zealand) Jason Richards	Tasman Motorsport	Holden Commodore (VE)	46		
19	14	(Australia) Cameron McConville	Brad Jones Racing	Holden Commodore (VE)	46		
20	12	(Australia) Andrew Jones	Brad Jones Racing	Holden Commodore (VE)	46		
21	777	(Australia) Michael Patrizi	Ford Rising Stars Racing	Ford Falcon (BF)	45	+ 1 lap	
22	26	(Australia) Marcus Marshall	Britek Motorsport	Ford Falcon (BF)	45	+ 1 lap	
23	50	(Australia) Andrew Thompson	Paul Weel Racing	Holden Commodore (VE)	45	+ 1 lap	
24	021	(New Zealand) Daniel Gaunt	Team Kiwi Racing	Ford Falcon (BF)	44	+ 2 laps	
25	33	(Australia) Lee Holdsworth	Garry Rogers Motorsport	Holden Commodore (VE)	36	+ 10 laps	
Ret	2	(Australia) Mark Skaife	Holden Racing Team	Holden Commodore (VE)	38	Retired	
Ret	55	(Australia) Tony D'Alberto	Rod Nash Racing	Holden Commodore (VE)	36	Retired	
Ret	88	(Australia) Jamie Whincup	Triple Eight Race Engineering	Ford Falcon (BF)	11	Retired	
Ret	11	(Australia) Jack Perkins	Perkins Engineering	Holden Commodore (VE)	1	Retired	
Fastest Lap: Jamie Whincup (Triple Eight Race Engineering) - 1:10.5408 on lap 6

=== Race 3 ===
Pos	No	Driver	Team	Car	Laps	Time/Retired	Grid
1	15	(Australia) Rick Kelly	HSV Dealer Team	Holden Commodore (VE)	46		
2	1	(Australia) Garth Tander	Holden Racing Team	Holden Commodore (VE)	46		
3	888	(Australia) Craig Lowndes	Triple Eight Race Engineering	Ford Falcon (BF)	46		
4	4	(Australia) James Courtney	Stone Brothers Racing	Ford Falcon (BF)	46		
5	9	(New Zealand) Shane van Gisbergen	Stone Brothers Racing	Ford Falcon (BF)	46		
6	33	(Australia) Lee Holdsworth	Garry Rogers Motorsport	Holden Commodore (VE)	46		
7	25	(Australia) Jason Bright	Britek Motorsport	Ford Falcon (BF)	46		
8	111	(New Zealand) Fabian Coulthard	Paul Cruickshank Racing	Ford Falcon (BF)	46		
9	67	(Australia) Paul Morris	Paul Morris Motorsport	Holden Commodore (VE)	46		
10	34	(Australia) Michael Caruso	Garry Rogers Motorsport	Holden Commodore (VE)	46		
11	39	(Australia) Russell Ingall	Paul Morris Motorsport	Holden Commodore (VE)	46		
12	2	(Australia) Mark Skaife	Holden Racing Team	Holden Commodore (VE)	46		
13	16	(Australia) Paul Dumbrell	HSV Dealer Team	Holden Commodore (VE)	46		
14	3	(New Zealand) Jason Richards	Tasman Motorsport	Holden Commodore (VE)	46		
15	50	(Australia) Andrew Thompson	Paul Weel Racing	Holden Commodore (VE)	46		
16	17	(Australia) Steven Johnson	Dick Johnson Racing	Ford Falcon (BF)	46		
17	120	(New Zealand) Steven Richards	Ford Performance Racing	Ford Falcon (BF)	46		
18	5	(Australia) Mark Winterbottom	Ford Performance Racing	Ford Falcon (BF)	46		
19	55	(Australia) Tony D'Alberto	Rod Nash Racing	Holden Commodore (VE)	46		
20	11	(Australia) Jack Perkins	Perkins Engineering	Holden Commodore (VE)	46		
21	18	(Australia) Will Davison	Dick Johnson Racing	Ford Falcon (BF)	46		
22	14	(Australia) Cameron McConville	Brad Jones Racing	Holden Commodore (VE)	46		
23	88	(Australia) Jamie Whincup	Triple Eight Race Engineering	Ford Falcon (BF)	45	+ 1 lap	
24	26	(Australia) Marcus Marshall	Britek Motorsport	Ford Falcon (BF)	45	+ 1 lap	
25	777	(Australia) Michael Patrizi	Ford Rising Stars Racing	Ford Falcon (BF)	44	+ 2 laps	
Ret	12	(Australia) Andrew Jones	Brad Jones Racing	Holden Commodore (VE)	24	Retired	
Ret	021	(New Zealand) Daniel Gaunt	Team Kiwi Racing	Ford Falcon (BF)	15	Retired	
Ret	51	(New Zealand) Greg Murphy	Tasman Motorsport	Holden Commodore (VE)	4	Retired	
Ret	7	(Australia) Todd Kelly	Perkins Engineering	Holden Commodore (VE)	2	Retired	
Fastest Lap: Craig Lowndes (Triple Eight Race Engineering) - 1:10.9847 on lap 11

== Championship standings ==
After round 14 of 14.

Pos	No	Name	Team	Points
1	88	Jamie Whincup	TeamVodafone	3332
2	5	Mark Winterbottom	Ford Performance Racing	3079
3	1	Garth Tander	Toll Holden Racing Team	3048
4	888	Craig Lowndes	TeamVodafone	2871
5	18	Will Davison	Dick Johnson Racing	2495

== Support categories ==
The 2008 NRMA Motoring + Services Grand Finale had seven support categories.

Category	Round winner
Fujitsu V8 Supercar Series	Jack Perkins (Holden VZ Commodore)
Australian Formula Ford Championship	Daniel Erickson (Spectrum 011b Ford)
V8 Utes Series	Grant Johnson (Holden VE Ute SS)
Aussie Racing Cars	Nick Simmons (Falcon-Yamaha)
Australian Mini Challenge	Jason Bargwanna (Mini Cooper R56)
Touring Car Masters	John Bowe (Chevrolet Camaro)
Group A/C	Paul Stubber (Holden LX Torana A9X)
