= 2007 V8 Supercar season =

Seasons
- ← 2006 2008 →

The 2007 V8 Supercar season was the 48th year of touring car racing in Australia since the first runnings of the Australian Touring Car Championship and the fore-runner of the present day Bathurst 1000, the Armstrong 500.

There were 15 touring car race meetings held during 2007; a fourteen-round series for V8 Supercars, the 2007 V8 Supercar Championship Series (VCS), two of them endurance races and a seven-round second tier V8 Supercar series 2007 Fujitsu V8 Supercar Series (FVS), all bar one of those was a double-header with a V8 Supercar Championship Series round.

This season saw a change of television broadcaster; the Seven Network having picked up the broadcasting rights to V8 Supercars from Network Ten and Fox Sports which had broadcast the past nine seasons in succession. However, the Seven Network had lost the rights to V8 Supercars in 2014. Since 2015, Network Ten and Fox Sports had revived the broadcasting rights for the V8 Supercars.

== Results and standings ==
=== Race calendar ===
The 2007 Australian touring car season consisted of 21 events held over 15 meetings.

| Date | Series | Circuit | City / state | Winner | Team | Car | Report |
|---|---|---|---|---|---|---|---|
| 2 - 4 Mar | FVS Round 1 | Adelaide Street Circuit | Adelaide, South Australia | Michael Caruso | Speed FX Racing | Ford BF Falcon | |
| 2 - 4 Mar | Clipsal 500 VCS Round 1 | Adelaide Street Circuit | Adelaide, South Australia | Todd Kelly | Holden Racing Team | Holden VZ Commodore | report |
| 23 - 25 Mar | BigPond 400 VCS Round 2 | Barbagallo Raceway | Perth, Western Australia | Garth Tander | HSV Dealer Team | Holden VE Commodore | report |
| 1 Apr | FVS Round 2 | Wakefield Park | Goulburn, New South Wales | Tony D'Alberto | Tony D'Alberto Racing | Holden VZ Commodore | |
| 21 - 22 Apr | PlaceMakers V8 International VCS Round 3 | Pukekohe Park Raceway | Pukekohe, New Zealand | Rick Kelly | HSV Dealer Team | Holden VE Commodore | report |
| 18–20 May | FVS Round 3 | Winton Motor Raceway | Benalla, Victoria | Tony D'Alberto | Tony D'Alberto Racing | Holden VZ Commodore | |
| 18–20 May | VCS Round 4 | Winton Motor Raceway | Benalla, Victoria | Jamie Whincup | Team Betta Electrical | Ford BF Falcon | report |
| 10 - 11 Jun | VCS Round 5 | Eastern Creek Raceway | Sydney, New South Wales | Mark Skaife | Holden Racing Team | Holden VE Commodore | report |
| 23 - 24 Jun | Skycity Triple Crown VCS Round 6 | Hidden Valley Raceway | Darwin, Northern Territory | Craig Lowndes | Triple Eight Race Engineering | Ford BF Falcon | report |
| 21 - 23 Jul | FVS Round 4 | Queensland Raceway | Ipswich, Queensland | Michael Caruso | Speed FX Racing | Ford BF Falcon | |
| 21 - 23 Jul | VCS Round 7 | Queensland Raceway | Ipswich, Queensland | Garth Tander | HSV Dealer Team | Holden VE Commodore | report |
| 18 - 19 Aug | FVS Round 5 | Oran Park Raceway | Sydney, New South Wales | Owen Kelly | Terry Wyhoon Racing | Ford BA Falcon | |
| 18 - 19 Aug | Jim Beam 400 VCS Round 8 | Oran Park Raceway | Sydney, New South Wales | Lee Holdsworth | Garry Rogers Motorsport | Holden VE Commodore | report |
| 14 - 16 Sep | Just Car Insurance 500 VCS Round 9 | Sandown Raceway | Melbourne, Victoria | Craig Lowndes; Jamie Whincup | Triple Eight Race Engineering | Ford BF Falcon | report |
| 5 - 7 Oct | FVS Round 6 | Mount Panorama Circuit | Bathurst, New South Wales | Luke Youlden | MacGill Motorsport | Ford BA Falcon | |
| 5 - 7 Oct | Supercheap Auto 1000 VCS Round 10 | Mount Panorama Circuit | Bathurst, New South Wales | Craig Lowndes; Jamie Whincup | Triple Eight Race Engineering | Ford BF Falcon | report |
| 19 - 21 Oct | V8 Supercar Challenge VCS Round 11 | Surfers Paradise Street Circuit | Surfers Paradise, Queensland | Garth Tander | HSV Dealer Team | Holden VE Commodore | report |
| 2 - 3 Nov | Desert 400 VCS Round 12 | Bahrain International Circuit | Manama, Bahrain | Mark Winterbottom | Ford Performance Racing | Ford BF Falcon | report |
| 16 - 18 Nov | Falken Tasmania Challenge VCS Round 13 | Symmons Plains Raceway | Launceston, Tasmania | Jamie Whincup | Triple Eight Race Engineering | Ford BF Falcon | report |
| 8 - 10 Dec | FVS Round 7 | Phillip Island Grand Prix Circuit | Phillip Island, Victoria | Michael Caruso | Speed FX Racing | Ford BF Falcon | |
| 8 - 10 Dec | Dunlop Grand Finale VCS Round 14 | Phillip Island Grand Prix Circuit | Phillip Island, Victoria | Garth Tander | HSV Dealer Team | Holden VE Commodore | report |
