= Speed FX Racing =

Australian motor racing team

Ford Rising Stars Racing
- Team Principal: Jim Morton
- Debut: 2008
- Final Season: 2008
- Round wins: 0
- Pole positions: 0
- 2008 position: 15th (844 pts)

Speed FX Racing (better known as Ford Rising Stars Racing) was an Australian motor racing team.

== History ==
Speed FX Racing began competing in V8 Supercar competition in 2004, entering the second tier with a Ford Falcon AU for Brad Tilley. Tilley managed just one top-ten finish in the first five rounds, and was replaced with Greg Ritter for the final event at Mallala where he won two of the three races. The team sat out the 2005 season, but returned in 2006 with Michael Caruso at the wheel of a Ford Falcon BA – Caruso scored four podium finishes en route to 4th in the standings, and was retained for the following season where he narrowly lost the title by 5pts to Tony D'Alberto. The team operated as a satellite of Ford Performance Racing in 2007, rebranding as Ford Rising Stars Racing, and operating a second car shared between Daniel Elliott and Grant Denyer.

For 2008, the team stepped up to the top flight having purchased a franchise from Paul Weel Racing. FPR were tasked with preparing the car and providing personnel, whilst Formula 3 Euro Series driver Michael Patrizi was signed to drive the car, bringing sponsorship from mining services company Ausdrill. Due to a lack of preparation time, the team received dispensation to skip the first two events and begin their campaign at the non-championship Australian Grand Prix support round.

The team achieved its best result at the Phillip Island 500, finishing 18th in a wet-dry race with Grant Denyer co-driving. Denyer was slated to drive in the teams' first Bathurst 1000, but suffered multiple fractured vertebrae in a monster truck incident and was replaced with Karl Reindler. Patrizi and Reindler finished 19th in the Bathurst 1000, after which Patrizi was assaulted by a team sponsor. The team folded at the end of 2008 and their Racing Entitlement Contract passed to Marcus Marshall Motorsport.

It later resurfaced in Touring Car Masters, where they were the first to build a Ford XB Falcon Hardtop for the series after the series expanded its vehicle eligibility in 2011. Two-time Australian Touring Car Champion Glenn Seton joined the team as a driver for selected events. The car was sold ahead of the 2012 season, and the team entered a partnership with Michael Wedge to run a Holden Monaro HQ.
