= Michael Patrizi =

Australian racing driver

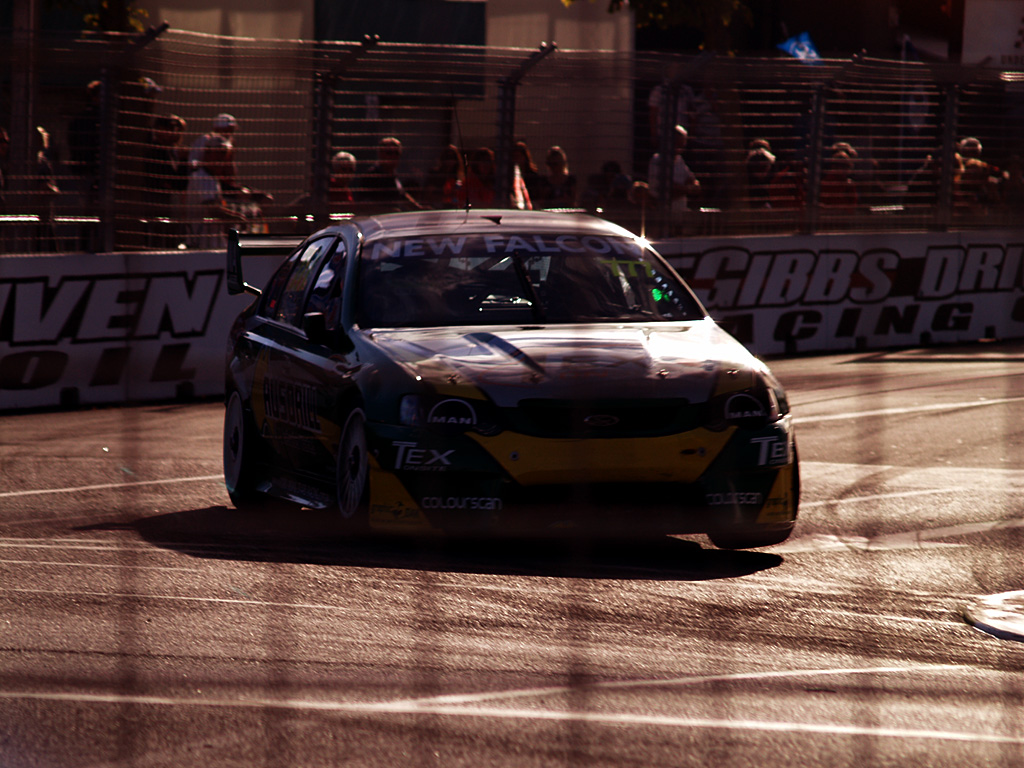
- Nationality: Australian
- Born: Michael Tony Patrizi; 4 May 1984 (age 42) Kalgoorlie, Western Australia
- Categorisation: FIA Silver

Supercars Championship career
- Current team: Tekno Autosports
- Championships: 0
- Races: 45
- Wins: 0
- Podiums: 0
- Pole positions: 0
- 2012 position: 18th (1397 pts)

Michael Tony Patrizi (born 4 May 1984) is an Australian racing driver.

== Biography ==
Starting off in karts in his native Western Australia, Patrizi moved to Formula Ford in 2004, then to Formula BMW in Asia 2005, then UK in 2006. In 2007, he joined the competitive ranks for the Formula Three Euroseries racing for the Prema Powerteam. Since 2008, Patrizi has returned home to compete in V8 Supercars and presently competes for Queensland-based team Tekno Autosports.

After two years in V8 Supercars racing for Ford Rising Stars Racing, then Paul Cruickshank Racing, Patrizi lost his seat in V8 Supercars. In February 2010, he made his debut in the Chevrolet Supercars Middle East Championship sedan series at Yas Marina Circuit, coming away with a race win.

In 2010 and 2011, Patrizi drove as an endurance driver in the V8 Supercar series and did a full season in the 2011 Australian Carrera Cup Championship. In 2012, Patrizi secured the newly created second seat at Tekno Autosports and had his best ever season in V8 Supercars.

== Career results ==
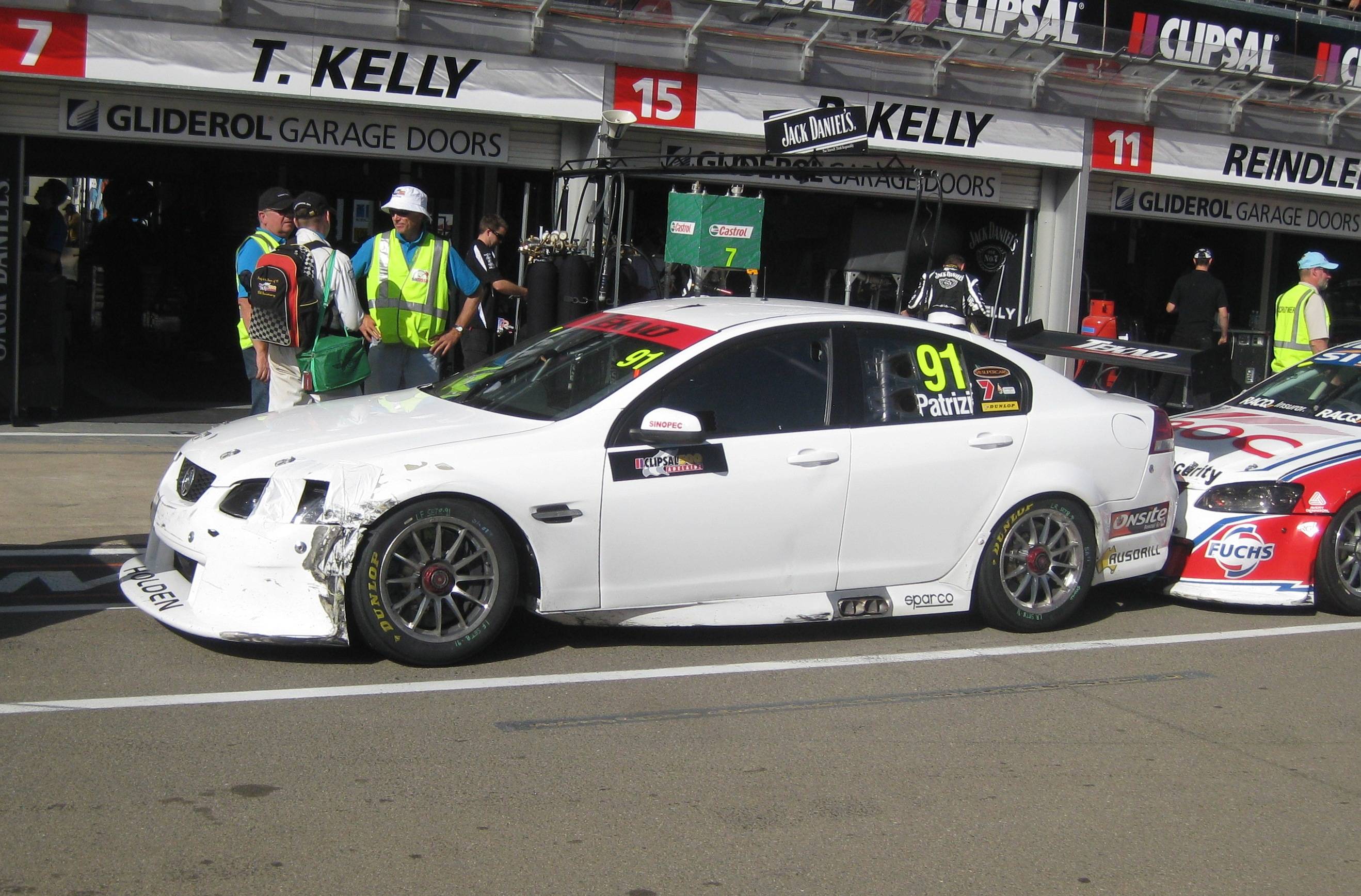
Holden VE Commodore of Michael Patrizi

Season	Series	Position	Car	Team
2000	Australian Junior Clubman Championship	3rd	Tecno – Yamaha	Patrizi Racing
2001	Australian CIK Intercontinental A class Championship	4th	Birel-Parilla	Patrizi Racing
2002	West Australian Clubman Light Karting Championship	1st	Birel – Yamaha	Patrizi Racing
2002	CIK-FIA Karting World Cup	2nd		Birel Motorsport
2002	Australian Formula 100 Karting Championship	1st		Patrizi Racing
2003	Australian Formula 100 Karting Championship	2nd		Patrizi Racing
2004	New South Wales Formula Ford Championship	4th	Van Diemen RF93	Anglo Australian Motorsport
2004	Victorian Formula Ford Championship	7th	Van Diemen RF93	Anglo Australian Motorsport
2005	Formula BMW Asia Championship	2nd	Mygale FB02 – BMW	Team Meritus
2006	Formula BMW UK Championship	8th	Mygale FB02 – BMW	Motaworld Racing
2006	Champ Car Atlantic Championship	26th	Swift 016.a – Mazda Cosworth	Walker Racing
2007	Formula Three Euroseries	18th	Dallara F306 – AMG Mercedes	Prema Powerteam
2008	V8 Supercar Championship Series	26th	Ford BF Falcon	Ford Rising Stars Racing
2009	V8 Supercar Championship Series	27th	Ford BF Falcon	Paul Cruickshank Racing
2010	V8 Supercar Championship Series	58th	Ford FG Falcon	Triple F Racing
2011	Australian Carrera Cup Championship	6th	Porsche 997 GT3 Cup Car	McElrea Racing
2011	International V8 Supercars Championship	56th	Ford FG Falcon	Triple F Racing
2012	International V8 Supercars Championship	18th	Holden VE Commodore	Tekno Autosports
2013	Australian Carrera Cup Championship	5th	Porsche 997 GT3 Cup	McElrea Racing
2014	Australian Carrera Cup Championship	8th	Porsche 911 GT3 Cup Type 991	Onsite Racing

=== Champ Car Atlantic ===
Year	Team	1	2	3	4	5	6	7	8	9	10	11	12	Rank	Points
2006	Walker Racing	LBH	HOU	MTY	POR	CLE1	CLE2	TOR	EDM	SJO	DEN	MTL; 8	ROA; 15	25th	21

=== Complete Formula 3 Euro Series results ===
(key)

Year	Team	Chassis	Engine	1	2	3	4	5	6	7	8	9	10	11	12	13	14	15	16	17	18	19	20	Pos	Points
2007	Prema Powerteam	Dallara F306/005	Mercedes	HOC; 1; 16	HOC; 2; 14	BRH; 1; 17	BRH; 2; 13	NOR; 1; 11	NOR; 2; 6	MAG; 1; 22	MAG; 2; 18	MUG; 1; 11	MUG; 2 Ret	ZAN; 1; 11	ZAN; 2; 21	NÜR; 1; 16	NÜR; 2; 22	CAT; 1; 17	CAT; 2 Ret	NOG; 1 Ret	NOG; 2; 17	HOC; 1 Ret	HOC; 2; 13	18th	1

=== Complete Bathurst 1000 results ===
Year	Team	Car	Co-driver	Position	Laps
2008	Ford Rising Stars Racing	Ford Falcon BF	(Australia) Karl Reindler	19th	156
2009	Paul Cruickshank Racing	Ford Falcon FG	(New Zealand) Fabian Coulthard	DNF	120
2010	Triple F Racing	Ford Falcon FG	(Australia) Dean Fiore	DNF	56
2011	Triple F Racing	Ford Falcon FG	(Australia) Dean Fiore	20th	160
2012	Tekno Autosports	Holden Commodore VE	(New Zealand) Jonny Reid	DNF	19
