= Paul Weel Racing =

Australian motor racing team

- Manufacturer: Ford; Holden
- Team Principal: Kees Weel
- Race Drivers: Paul Weel (1998–2008); Neal Bates (1998); Greg Crick (1999–2000); Tim Leahey (2001); Geoff Full (2002); Mark Porter (2002); Jason Bright (2003–2004); Marcus Marshall (2003–2004); Greg Ritter (2003); Matthew White (2004); Greg Murphy (2005–2006); Owen Kelly (2005); Nathan Pretty (2005–2006); Cameron McConville (2006–2007); Paul Dumbrell (2007); David Reynolds (2007); Andrew Thompson (2008)
- Chassis: Ford EL Falcon; Ford AU Falcon; Holden VX Commodore; Holden VY Commodore; Holden VZ Commodore; Holden VE Commodore
- Debut: 1998
- Round wins: 3
- 2008 position: 6
- 16th 767 points

Paul Weel Racing was an Australian motor racing team which competed in the V8 Supercars Championship Series between 1998 and 2008.

== Ford Years ==
After some brief appearances in 1997 in minor events, Paul Weel Racing debuted in the 1998 Australian Touring Car Championship with Paul Weel driving an ex Longhurst Racing constructed Ford EL Falcon. The year was highlighted by a ninth-place finish at the Bathurst 1000.

Unlike most other privateer teams who purchased older cars from the professional teams, Paul Weel Racing in 1999 built its own AU Falcon. A further four would be built by the end of 2002.

== Moving to Holden ==
In 2003, Paul Weel Racing became a satellite team of Walkinshaw Racing, who already ran the Holden Racing Team and K-Mart Racing. Relocating to Clayton, Victoria, an alliance was formed with Peter Brock and the team rebranded Team Brock. Two Walkinshaw Racing Holden Commodore VXs were transferred along with Jason Bright. A two-car Racing Entitlement Contract (REC) was purchased from John Faulkner Racing. The team's existing one-car REC was retained and periodically leased to other drivers until sold to Perkins Engineering in 2005.

The relationship with Brock was dissolved at the end of 2003, with the team resuming its Paul Weel Racing identity for 2004 with Bright finishing third in the series.

== Partnership with Supercheap Auto ==
In 2005, Greg Murphy replaced Bright and the team signed a three-year sponsorship deal with Supercheap Auto. While continuing with its ex Holden Racing Team chassis, it switched to Perkins Engineering engines. It also relocated to the former Gibson Motorsport premises in Dandenong. At the end of the season, Paul Weel retired with Cameron McConville joining the team in 2006.

In 2007 Paul Dumbrell replaced Murphy with the team upgrading to self built Commodore VEs. After a deal to sell the team mid-season to John Marshall collapsed, Kees Weel announced his intention to close the team at the end of the year.

One REC was sold to Ford Rising Stars Racing, but having been unable to find a buyer for its remaining REC and with the threat of a fine of $150,000 for every round missed, Paul Weel Racing contested the 2008 series with a single Commodore VE for Andrew Thompson. At the end of the year the team closed with the REC sold to Walkinshaw Racing.
