= 2008 Supercheap Auto Bathurst 1000 =

Motor race in Australia

Seasons
- ← 2007 2009 →

(New South Wales) 2008 Supercheap Auto Bathurst 1000
Event Information
- Round 10 of 14 in the 2008 V8 Supercar Championship Series
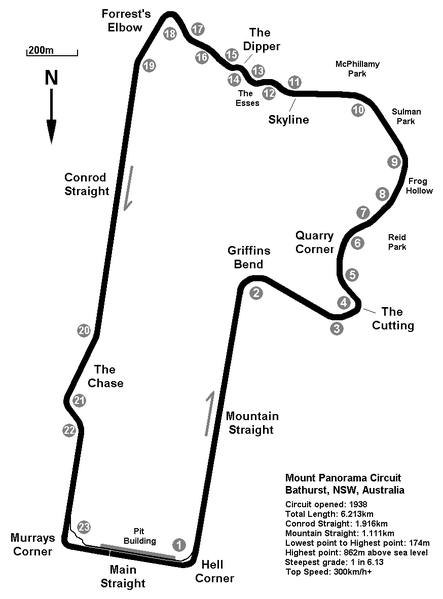
- Date: 9–12 October 2008
- Location: Bathurst, New South Wales
- Venue: Mount Panorama Circuit
- Weather: Fine

Results
Race 1
Distance	161 laps	1000 km
Pole position	Garth Tander; Holden Racing Team	2:07.2963
Winner	Craig Lowndes; Jamie Whincup; Triple Eight Race Engineering	6:26:00.4291
Round Results
First	Craig Lowndes Jamie Whincup; Triple Eight Race Engineering	300 pts
Second	Jason Richards Greg Murphy; Tasman Motorsport	276 pts
Third	James Courtney David Besnard; Stone Brothers Racing	258 pts

The 2008 Supercheap Auto Bathurst 1000 was the twelfth running of the Australian 1000 race, first held after the organisational split over the Bathurst 1000 that occurred in 1997. It was the 51st race tracing its lineage back to the 1960 Armstrong 500 held at Phillip Island.

The race, which was the tenth round of the 2008 V8 Supercar Championship Series, held from 9–12 October at the Mount Panorama Circuit in Bathurst, New South Wales.

Craig Lowndes and Jamie Whincup driving a Ford BF Falcon for Triple Eight Race Engineering, won the race for the third year in succession, the first 'three-peat' of Bathurst 1000 wins since 1984.

== Entry list ==
Twenty-nine cars were entered into the event – 16 Holden Commodores and 13 Ford Falcons. At the time it was the lowest field size since the race moved to Bathurst in 1963. Seven drivers made their debut in 2008 – Chris Pither, Dale Wood, Boris Said, Fabrizio Giovanardi, Marc Hynes, Michael Patrizi and Karl Reindler. The three non-Antipodean drivers (Said, Giovanardi and Hynes) would be making their only appearances in the race. Kayne Scott, Adam Macrow and Steven Ellery made their last starts in 2008, whilst Paul Radisich and Paul Weel were entered for the final time but did not make the start of the race.

No.	Drivers	Team	Car	No.	Drivers	Team	Car
1	(Australia) Garth Tander (Australia) Mark Skaife	Holden Racing Team (Holden, Toll)	Holden Commodore VE	021	(New Zealand) Kayne Scott (New Zealand) Chris Pither	Team Kiwi Racing (Makita)	Ford Falcon BF
2	(New Zealand) Craig Baird (Australia) Glenn Seton	Holden Racing Team (Holden, Toll)	Holden Commodore VE	25	(Australia) Jason Bright (Australia) Adam Macrow	Britek Motorsport (Fujitsu)	Ford Falcon BF
3	(New Zealand) Jason Richards (New Zealand) Greg Murphy	Tasman Motorsport (Sprint Gas)	Holden Commodore VE	26	(Australia) Marcus Marshall (New Zealand) Matthew Halliday	Britek Motorsport (Irwin Tools)	Ford Falcon BF
4	(Australia) James Courtney (Australia) David Besnard	Stone Brothers Racing (Jeld-Wen)	Ford Falcon BF	33	(Australia) Lee Holdsworth (Australia) Michael Caruso	Garry Rogers Motorsport (Valvoline, Cummins)	Holden Commodore VE
5	(Australia) Luke Youlden (Australia) Dean Canto	Ford Performance Racing (Orrcon Steel)	Ford Falcon BF	34	(Australia) Greg Ritter (Australia) Steven Ellery	Garry Rogers Motorsport (Valvoline, Cummins)	Holden Commodore VE
6	(Australia) Mark Winterbottom (New Zealand) Steven Richards	Ford Performance Racing (Castrol)	Ford Falcon BF	39	(Australia) Russell Ingall (Australia) Paul Morris	Paul Morris Motorsport (Supercheap Auto)	Holden Commodore VE
7	(Australia) Todd Kelly (Australia) Shane Price	Perkins Engineering (Jack Daniel's)	Holden Commodore VE	50	(Australia) Andrew Thompson (Australia) Paul Weel	Paul Weel Racing (PWR Performance Products)	Holden Commodore VE
9	(New Zealand) Shane van Gisbergen (Australia) Jonathon Webb	Stone Brothers Racing (SP Tools)	Ford Falcon BF	51	(Australia) Mark Noske (Australia) Dale Wood	Tasman Motorsport (Sprint Gas)	Holden Commodore VE
11	(Australia) Jack Perkins (Australia) Nathan Pretty	Perkins Engineering (Jack Daniel's)	Holden Commodore VE	55	(Australia) Tony D'Alberto (Australia) Jason Bargwanna	Rod Nash Racing (The Bottle-O)	Holden Commodore VE
12	(Australia) Cameron McConville (Australia) Andrew Jones	Brad Jones Racing (BOC Gas and Gear)	Holden Commodore VE	67	(United Kingdom) Matt Neal (United States) Boris Said	Paul Morris Motorsport (Supercheap Auto)	Holden Commodore VE
14	(Brazil) Max Wilson (Australia) Brad Jones	Brad Jones Racing (WOW Sight & Sound)	Holden Commodore VE	88	(Italy) Fabrizio Giovanardi (United Kingdom) Marc Hynes	Triple Eight Race Engineering (Vodafone)	Ford Falcon BF
15	(Australia) Rick Kelly (New Zealand) Paul Radisich	HSV Dealer Team (Toll)	Holden Commodore VE	111	(New Zealand) Fabian Coulthard (Australia) Alex Davison	Paul Cruickshank Racing (Glenfords Tools)	Ford Falcon BF
16	(Australia) Paul Dumbrell (Australia) David Reynolds	HSV Dealer Team (Autobarn)	Holden Commodore VE	777	(Australia) Michael Patrizi (Australia) Karl Reindler	Ford Rising Stars Racing (Ausdrill)	Ford Falcon BF
17	(Australia) Steve Owen (Australia) Warren Luff	Dick Johnson Racing (Jim Beam)	Ford Falcon BF	888	(Australia) Craig Lowndes (Australia) Jamie Whincup	Triple Eight Race Engineering (Vodafone)	Ford Falcon BF
18	(Australia) Will Davison (Australia) Steven Johnson	Dick Johnson Racing (Jim Beam)	Ford Falcon BF				

=== Driver changes ===
The following driver changes were made following the 2008 L&H 500:

Alex Davison joined the Glenfords Racing team alongside regular driver Fabian Coulthard, replacing John McIntyre who substituted for Davison at the L&H 500.

Karl Reindler replaced Grant Denyer at Ford Rising Stars Racing. Denyer suffered a spinal injury while competing in the NSW Monster Truck Championships at the Dapto Groundz Precinct and was sidelined for the rest of the season.

== Practice ==
Free practice began on Thursday 9 October when three sessions were held. The first session, (in which the top 15 placegetters from the 2007 V8Supercar Championship Series are not allowed to take part), was topped by Warren Luff in the second Jim Beam Racing Falcon with a 2:10.7158 ahead of Tony D'Alberto in the Rod Nash Racing Commodore and Alex Davison in the Glenfords Racing Falcon.

Garth Tander topped the second session, recording a 2:09.3700 in the Holden Racing Team Commodore ahead of Craig Lowndes in the Team Vodafone Falcon and Greg Murphy in the Sprint Gas Racing Commodore. Jason Bargwanna continued D'Alberto's form from the first session to be fourth fastest in a session marred by a crash for Jack Perkins who backed the Jack Daniel's Racing Commodore into the wall across the top of the Mountain, putting the car out of action for the day.

A second red flag emerged in the longest third session, for the Sprint Gas Racing Commodore shared by Mark Noske and Dale Wood. After the resumption Jamie Whincup recorded the fastest time of the day, a 2:07.5975 in the Team Vodafone Falcon, to be two hundredths quicker than Greg Murphy (Sprint Gas Racing Commodore). Mark Winterbottom was third fastest for Ford Performance Racing ahead of Rick Kelly (HSV Dealer Team Commodore), Russell Ingall (Supercheap Auto Racing), Steve Owen (Jim Beam Racing), Paul Dumbrell (HSV Dealer Team), Lee Holdsworth (Garry Rogers Motorsport), Shane van Gisbergen (Stone Brothers Racing) with Garth Tander completing the top ten fastest cars.

In the first practice session on Friday morning a major accident occurred at Sulman Park when Chris Pither struck a stationary Paul Weel. Weel had to be cut from the wreckage, but neither driver was seriously hurt. Both cars were withdrawn suffering from extensive damage. With both cars belonging to single car teams, Paul Weel Racing and Team Kiwi Racing appeared to be eliminated from the meeting. However the Team Kiwi Falcon was repaired and did in fact start in Sunday's race.

Garth Tander topped the morning's practice sessions with a 2:06.9922, with Jamie Whincup recording a 2:07.1371 in the second Friday session. Combined times saw Craig Lowndes third fastest ahead of James Courtney, Jason Richards, Steve Owen, Greg Murphy, Will Davison, Steven Richards all under 2:08 with Mark Winterbottom completing the fastest ten drivers.

In Saturday morning practice Jason Richards recorded the fastest lap of the weekend, a 2:06.9076. Paul Radisich had a major accident at McPhillamy Park Corner when a stuck throttle pushed the HSV Dealer Team Commodore into the wall. Radisich broke his right ankle in the accident. The car sustained heavy damage and was subsequently withdrawn. Later in the day it was announced that David Reynolds would step out of his drive in the second HSV Dealer Team Commodore in order to allow Rick Kelly to start the race.

== Qualifying ==
Mark Winterbottom took provisional pole position during qualifying on 10 October, snatching it in the final lap of leg two to secure the tenth and final Top 10 Shootout position with a 2:07.1920 lap. Jason Richards had held top spot for the final ten minutes of the session, finishing second fastest. Jamie Whincup was third fastest ahead of James Courtney. Garth Tander was fifth fastest in the Holden Racing Team Commodore ahead of arms-length teammate Rick Kelly. Will Davison and Paul Dumbrell were next with Fabian Coulthard climbing into the top ten towards the end of the session in the Paul Cruickshank Racing Falcon. Tenth fastest and first Shootout position was claimed by Russell Ingall, with Max Wilson spinning at Murray's Corner on the last lap chasing a top ten position.

A power steering leak took Lee Holdsworth out of qualifying by pitching him into the wall at the Dipper, leaving him in 14th, while Fabrizio Giovanardi damaged the second Triple Eight Race Engineering Falcon, bringing out red flags during leg one of qualifying.

After the withdrawal of the damaged Kelly/Radisich car, the Wilson/Jones entry was promoted into the Top 10 Shootout.

== Top 10 Shootout ==
The Top 10 Shootout was held on Saturday 11 October 2008. Max Wilson and Fabian Coulthard were rapidly consigned to the bottom spots, handicapped by a lack of fresh tyres for the Shootout. Paul Dumbrell was quick jumping into a high 2:07 lap. Will Davison was untidy on his lap. Garth Tander was very quick, recording what become pole position, a 2:07.2963. James Courtney was quick, but half a second behind Tander. Jamie Whincup's car appeared unsettled and Jason Richards had a big moment at Reid Park, losing him two tenths of a second that he never recovered. Mark Winterbottom was ahead of Tander at the second sector split but was slower down the hill, finishing second fastest, 0.12s behind Tander.

== Race ==
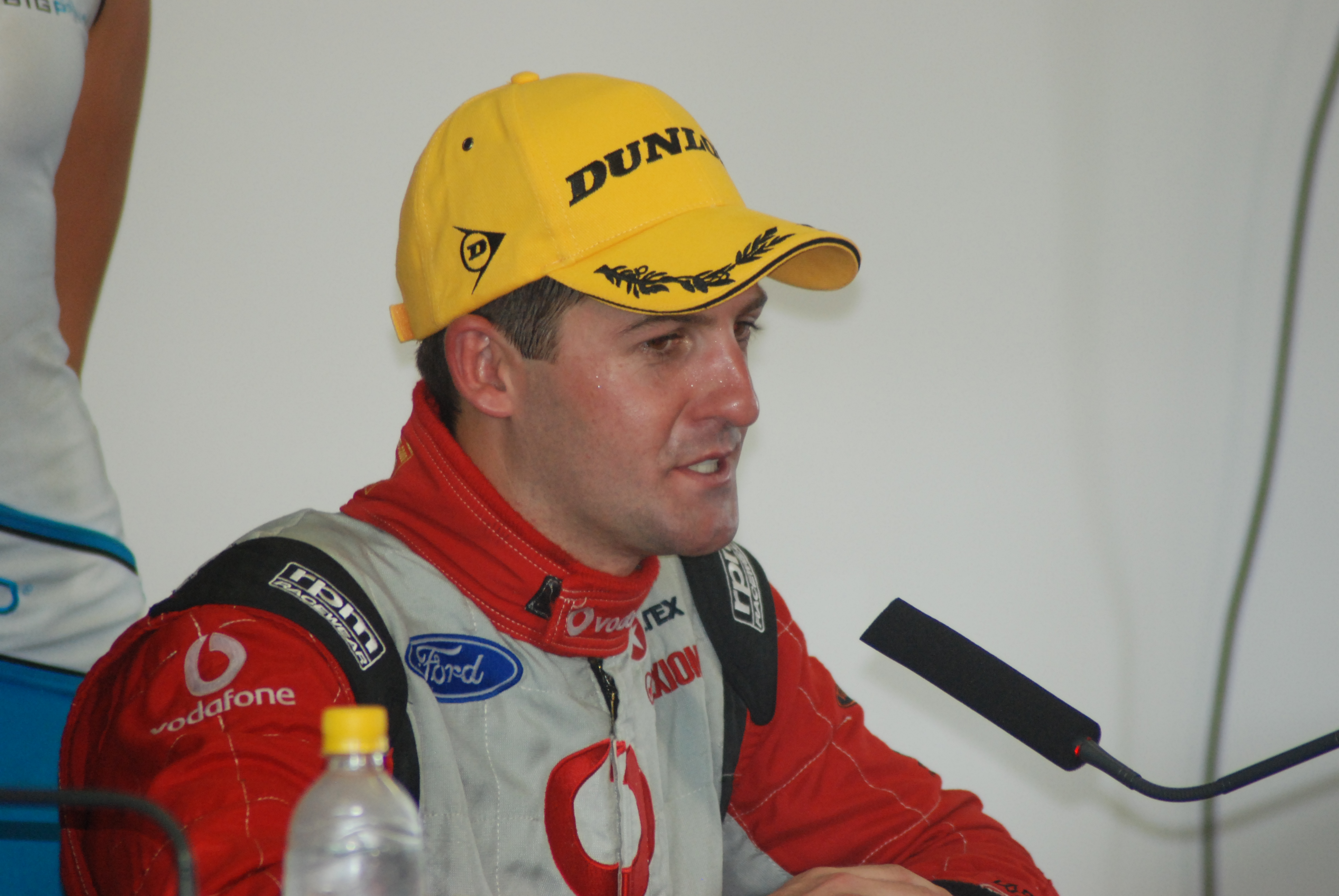
Jamie Whincup (pictured) and Craig Lowndes won the 2008 Supercheap Auto Bathurst 1000 driving a Ford BF Falcon for Triple Eight Race Engineering

From pole position Garth Tander stalled allowing Steven Richards to lead early. Later Tander was also assigned a ten-second penalty for jumping the start as well. The Penalty was served at the car's first pitstop. Into Griffins Bend on the opening lap Craig Lowndes and Greg Murphy touched, giving the Holden slight damage which caused Murphy to pit on lap four. James Courtney raced through to dominate the opening stint. Craig Lowndes gave chase with Will Davison settling in to chase with Max Wilson and Russell Ingall leading the Holden charge while Steven Richards and Rick Kelly (starting Paul Dumbrell's Commodore) slid backwards.

Starting with Jack Perkins on lap 15 cars started to appear in the pits with a failed left rear tyre. Delaminations were to strike the entire field throughout the day, with the cars of Will Davison, Todd Kelly and Lee Holdsworth worst affected of the front runners. Kayne Scott was the first retirement on lap eight, the hastily repaired Team Kiwi Racing Falcon was four-five seconds behind the pace and effectively unraceable. The second retirement was on 40 when Andrew Jones spun the Brad Jones Racing Commodore into the wall at Griffin's Bend. Jones limped the car back to the pits without bothering the safety car. By this stage Rick Kelly was out of contention, with the same sticking throttle that caused the #15 car to crash on Saturday starting to blight the #16 car.

A slowly deflating tyre (originally diagnosed as a damaged anti-roll bar) slowed David Besnard's stint in James Courtney's car allowing Jamie Whincup to assert dominance over the field in the second stint. The first safety car occurred on lap 73, after Todd Kelly spun his Jack Daniel's Racing Commodore across the Chase dumped sandtrap debris across the most delicate corner of the circuit. Marshals worked to clean the corner and get the race quickly back under way. The third safety car was called about 15 laps later when Michael Patrizi spun the Ford Rising Stars Falcon at Murray's Corner. Just after the restart Jonathan Webb put the second Stone Brothers Racing Falcon into the sandtrap at McPhillamy Park after striking the wall exiting the previous corner, becoming the race's third retirement. Lowndes pitted for Whincup's second stint at this point. With a safety car having s recently occurred Whincup was buried, emerging back into the field in 17th position. Will Davison moved into the lead at this point that he would hold until lap 98 when he pitted. Greg Murphy led for a single lap before pitting for Jason Richards, handing the lead to Max Wilson. Wilson lead until the next safety car on lap 106 when he pitted for Brad Jones and Jamie Whincup resumed the lead.

By this stage Mark Skaife had removed the lead Holden Racing Team Commodore from contention, wiping the car's nose across the Forrests Elbow wall. A safety car on lap 128 caused the majority of the field to pit, putting David Besnard back into the lead until his final stop for James Courtney on lap 137. Two rapid safety cars occurred shortly afterwards, first after Lee Holdsworth's Commodore stopped in the Cutting, then at the restart a touch between Craig Baird, who had just been unsettled by another car passing him at Griffin's Bend, and Warren Luff in the second Jim Beam Racing Falcon, put Baird into the wall. Luff was given a drive-through penalty for his part in the incident. Russell Ingall also dropped out at roughly this point with power steering failure.

At the lap 147 restart Lowndes led from Steven Richards and Greg Murphy. Tucked in behind were Max Wilson and James Courtney ahead of Tony D'Alberto, Fabian Coulthard, Warren Luff (about to pit for his penalty), Jason Bright and Luke Youlden. Courtney, on fresh tyres and cut through the pack and on lap 153 ducked under Max Wilson at Forrests Elbow for fourth place. Murphy, while faster than Richards was unable to get by, allowing Lowndes to build a comfortable buffer. On lap 158 Murphy finally moved into second position at Hell Corner and set off after Lowndes. Two laps later, Richards, fading badly on rear tyres was unable to stop Courtney move into third place. The gaps stabilised over the final laps and Lowndes took a two-second victory, earning himself and Jamie Whincup their third consecutive victory, a feat not managed since Peter Brock and Larry Perkins took their third consecutive win in the 1984 Bathurst 1000.

Behind Murphy and Courtney, Steven Richards hung onto fourth position ahead of Max Wilson. Tony D'Alberto spun into the Griffins Bend wall on the second last lap, becoming the races final retirement. Will Davison climbed back into sixth position after a late race tyre delamination had removed him lead battle. Luke Youlden completed a good team result for Ford Performance Racing in seventh ahead of Jack Perkins and Jason Bright. Fabian Coulthard dropped to tenth after having to make a pitstop for fuel with two laps to go. Warren Luff was the final car to complete full race distance in eleventh.

Garth Tander limped home in twelfth place ahead of Mark Noske, Marcus Marshall and Fabrizio Giovanardi. Two of the hardest hit by tyre delaminations, Steve Ellery and Todd Kelly finished 16th and 17th and were the last fit cars home. Ingall limped his car home for some championship points ahead of Patrizi, while Rick Kelly and Dumbrell were classified in 20th position after the team rebuilt the throttle linkages, having lost 34 laps.

The race victory vaulted Whincup back into the championship lead he lost after crashing out of the Hamilton 400 in April. Tander's twelfth-place finish helped to minimise the points loss but dropped to third place behind Mark Winterbottom.

== Results ==
=== Qualifying ===
Pos	No	Name	Car	Team	Leg 2	Leg 1
1	6	(Australia) Mark Winterbottom (New Zealand) Steven Richards	Ford BF Falcon	Ford Performance Racing	2:07.1920	
2	3	(New Zealand) Jason Richards (New Zealand) Greg Murphy	Holden VE Commodore	Sprint Gas Racing	2:07.2333	
3	888	(Australia) Jamie Whincup (Australia) Craig Lowndes	Ford BF Falcon	Team Vodafone	2:07.2699	
4	4	(Australia) James Courtney (Australia) David Besnard	Ford BF Falcon	Jeld-Wen Motorsport	2:07.2972	
5	1	(Australia) Garth Tander (Australia) Mark Skaife	Holden VE Commodore	Holden Racing Team	2:07.3645	
6	18	(Australia) Will Davison (Australia) Steven Johnson	Ford BF Falcon	Jim Beam Racing	2:07.4599	
7	16	(Australia) Paul Dumbrell (Australia) Rick Kelly (Australia) David Reynolds	Holden VE Commodore	Autobarn Racing Team	2:07.6094	
8	111	(New Zealand) Fabian Coulthard (Australia) Alex Davison	Ford BF Falcon	Glenfords Racing	2:07.7321	
9	39	(Australia) Russell Ingall (Australia) Paul Morris	Holden VE Commodore	Supercheap Auto Racing	2:07.7974	
10	14	(Brazil) Max Wilson (Australia) Brad Jones	Holden VE Commodore	WOW Racing	2:07.8022	
11	25	(Australia) Jason Bright (Australia) Adam Macrow	Ford BF Falcon	Fujitsu Racing	2:07.9395	
12	9	(New Zealand) Shane van Gisbergen (Australia) Jonathon Webb	Ford BF Falcon	SP Tools Racing	2:09.7451	
13	33	(Australia) Lee Holdsworth (Australia) Michael Caruso	Holden VE Commodore	Garry Rogers Motorsport	2:07.9968	
14	17	(Australia) Steve Owen (Australia) Warren Luff	Ford BF Falcon	Jim Beam Racing	2:08.0369	
15	12	(Australia) Cameron McConville (Australia) Andrew Jones	Holden VE Commodore	Team BOC	2:08.1141	
16	5	(Australia) Luke Youlden (Australia) Dean Canto	Ford BF Falcon	Ford Performance Racing	2:08.1676	
17	7	(Australia) Todd Kelly (Australia) Shane Price	Holden VE Commodore	Jack Daniel's Racing	2:08.2226	
18	11	(Australia) Jack Perkins (Australia) Nathan Pretty	Holden VE Commodore	Jack Daniel's Racing	2:08.4667	
19	2	(New Zealand) Craig Baird (Australia) Glenn Seton	Holden VE Commodore	Holden Racing Team	2:08.5766	
20	777	(Australia) Michael Patrizi (Australia) Karl Reindler	Ford BF Falcon	Ausdrill Ford Rising Stars Racing		2:09.4965
21	26	(Australia) Marcus Marshall (New Zealand) Matt Halliday	Ford BF Falcon	Irwin Racing		2:09.6397
22	34	(Australia) Greg Ritter (Australia) Steve Ellery	Holden VE Commodore	Garry Rogers Motorsport		2:09.7451
23	55	(Australia) Tony D'Alberto (Australia) Jason Bargwanna	Holden VE Commodore	Bottle O Racing		2:09.9264
24	88	(Italy) Fabrizio Giovanardi (United Kingdom) Marc Hynes	Ford BF Falcon	Team Vodafone		2:09.9779
25	51	(Australia) Mark Noske (Australia) Dale Wood	Holden VE Commodore	Sprint Gas Racing		2:10.2930
26	67	(United Kingdom) Matt Neal (United States) Boris Said	Holden VE Commodore	Supercheap Auto Racing		2:11.3259
27	021	(New Zealand) Kayne Scott (New Zealand) Chris Pither	Ford BF Falcon	Team Kiwi Racing		No time
Wdn	15	(Australia) Rick Kelly (New Zealand) Paul Radisich	Holden VE Commodore	HSV Dealer Team	2:07.4401	
Wdn	50	(Australia) Andrew Thompson (Australia) Paul Weel	Holden VE Commodore	PWR Racing		

=== Top 10 Shootout ===
Pos	No	Driver	Car	Team	Time
Pole	1	(Australia) Garth Tander	Holden VE Commodore	Holden Racing Team	2:07.2963
2	6	(Australia) Mark Winterbottom	Ford BF Falcon	Ford Performance Racing	2:07.4206
3	4	(Australia) James Courtney	Ford BF Falcon	Jeld-Wen Motorsport	2:07.7025
4	16	(New Zealand) Paul Dumbrell	Holden VE Commodore	Autobarn Racing Team	2:07.8022
5	888	(Australia) Jamie Whincup	Ford BF Falcon	Team Vodafone	2:07.9513
6	3	(New Zealand) Jason Richards	Holden VE Commodore	Sprint Gas Racing	2:07.9876
7	18	(Australia) Will Davison	Ford BF Falcon	Jim Beam Racing	2:08.2511
8	39	(Australia) Russell Ingall	Holden VE Commodore	Supercheap Auto Racing	2:08.7800
9	111	(New Zealand) Fabian Coulthard	Ford BF Falcon	Glenfords Racing	2:08.8051
10	14	(Brazil) Max Wilson	Holden VE Commodore	WOW Racing	2:09.1940

=== Starting grid ===
The following table represents the final starting grid for the race on Sunday:

Inside row			Outside row		
1	(Australia) Garth Tander (Australia) Mark Skaife	1	6	(Australia) Mark Winterbottom (New Zealand) Steven Richards	2
1	Holden Racing Team (Holden Commodore VE)		Ford Performance Racing (Ford Falcon BF)		2
3	(Australia) James Courtney (Australia) David Besnard	4	16	(Australia) Paul Dumbrell (Australia) Rick Kelly	4
3	Stone Brothers Racing (Ford Falcon BF)		HSV Dealer Team (Holden Commodore VE)		4
5	(Australia) Craig Lowndes (Australia) Jamie Whincup	888	3	(New Zealand) Jason Richards (New Zealand) Greg Murphy	6
5	Triple Eight Race Engineering (Ford Falcon BF)		Tasman Motorsport (Holden Commodore VE)		6
7	(Australia) Will Davison (Australia) Steven Johnson	18	39	(Australia) Russell Ingall (Australia) Paul Morris	8
7	Dick Johnson Racing (Ford Falcon BF)		Paul Morris Motorsport (Holden Commodore VE)		8
9	(New Zealand) Fabian Coulthard (Australia) Alex Davison	111	14	(Brazil) Max Wilson (Australia) Brad Jones	10
9	Paul Cruickshank Racing (Ford Falcon BF)		Brad Jones Racing (Holden Commodore VE)		10
11	(Australia) Jason Bright (Australia) Adam Macrow	25	9	(New Zealand) Shane van Gisbergen (Australia) Jonathon Webb	12
11	Britek Motorsport (Ford Falcon BF)		Stone Brothers Racing (Ford Falcon BF)		12
13	(Australia) Lee Holdsworth (Australia) Michael Caruso	33	17	(Australia) Steve Owen (Australia) Warren Luff	14
13	Garry Rogers Motorsport (Holden Commodore VE)		Dick Johnson Racing (Ford Falcon BF)		14
15	(Australia) Cameron McConville (Australia) Andrew Jones	12	5	(Australia) Luke Youlden (Australia) Dean Canto	16
15	Brad Jones Racing (Holden Commodore VE)		Ford Performance Racing (Ford Falcon BF)		16
17	(Australia) Todd Kelly (Australia) Shane Price	7	11	(Australia) Jack Perkins (Australia) Nathan Pretty	18
17	Perkins Engineering (Holden Commodore VE)		Perkins Engineering (Holden Commodore VE)		18
19	(New Zealand) Craig Baird (Australia) Glenn Seton	2	777	(Australia) Michael Patrizi (Australia) Karl Reindler	20
19	Holden Racing Team (Holden Commodore VE)		Ford Rising Stars Racing (Ford Falcon BF)		20
21	(Australia) Marcus Marshall (New Zealand) Matthew Halliday	26	34	(Australia) Greg Ritter (Australia) Steven Ellery	22
21	Britek Motorsport (Ford Falcon BF)		Garry Rogers Motorsport (Holden Commodore VE)		22
23	(Australia) Tony D'Alberto (Australia) Jason Bargwanna	55	88	(Italy) Fabrizio Giovanardi (United Kingdom) Marc Hynes	24
23	Rod Nash Racing (Holden Commodore VE)		Triple Eight Race Engineering (Ford Falcon BF)		24
25	(Australia) Mark Noske (Australia) Dale Wood	51	67	(United Kingdom) Matt Neal (United States) Boris Said	26
25	Tasman Motorsport (Holden Commodore VE)		Paul Morris Motorsport (Holden Commodore VE)		26
27	(New Zealand) Kayne Scott (New Zealand) Chris Pither	021			
27	Team Kiwi Racing (Ford Falcon BF)				

=== Race ===
Pos	No	Name	Car	Team	Laps	Time/Retired	Grid	Points
1	888	(Australia) Jamie Whincup (Australia) Craig Lowndes	Ford BF Falcon	Triple Eight Race Engineering	161	6:26:00.4291	5	300
2	3	(New Zealand) Jason Richards (New Zealand) Greg Murphy	Holden VE Commodore	Tasman Motorsport	161	+2.4978	6	276
3	4	(Australia) James Courtney (Australia) David Besnard	Ford BF Falcon	Stone Brothers Racing	161	+4.5824	3	258
4	6	(Australia) Mark Winterbottom (New Zealand) Steven Richards	Ford BF Falcon	Ford Performance Racing	161	+5.1888	2	240
5	14	(Brazil) Max Wilson (Australia) Brad Jones	Holden VE Commodore	Brad Jones Racing	161	+10.3239	10	222
6	18	(Australia) Will Davison (Australia) Steven Johnson	Ford BF Falcon	Dick Johnson Racing	161	+10.9588	7	204
7	5	(Australia) Luke Youlden (Australia) Dean Canto	Ford BF Falcon	Ford Performance Racing	161	+21.6530	16	192
8	11	(Australia) Jack Perkins (Australia) Nathan Pretty	Holden VE Commodore	Perkins Engineering	161	+30.8391	18	180
9	25	(Australia) Jason Bright (Australia) Adam Macrow	Ford BF Falcon	Britek Motorsport	161	+32.6680	11	168
10	111	(New Zealand) Fabian Coulthard (Australia) Alex Davison	Ford BF Falcon	Paul Cruickshank Racing	161	+54.8277	9	156
11	17	(Australia) Steve Owen (Australia) Warren Luff	Ford BF Falcon	Dick Johnson Racing	161	+1:44.3574	14	144
12	1	(Australia) Garth Tander (Australia) Mark Skaife	Holden VE Commodore	Holden Racing Team	160	+1 lap	1	138
13	51	(Australia) Mark Noske (Australia) Dale Wood	Holden VE Commodore	Tasman Motorsport	160	+1 lap	25	132
14	26	(Australia) Marcus Marshall (New Zealand) Matt Halliday	Ford BF Falcon	Britek Motorsport	160	+1 lap	21	126
15	88	(Italy) Fabrizio Giovanardi (United Kingdom) Marc Hynes	Ford BF Falcon	Triple Eight Race Engineering	159	+2 laps	24	120
16	34	(Australia) Greg Ritter (Australia) Steve Ellery	Holden VE Commodore	Garry Rogers Motorsport	157	+4 laps	22	114
17	7	(Australia) Todd Kelly (Australia) Shane Price	Holden VE Commodore	Perkins Engineering	157	+4 laps	17	108
18	39	(Australia) Russell Ingall (Australia) Paul Morris	Holden VE Commodore	Paul Morris Motorsport	156	+5 laps	8	102
19	777	(Australia) Michael Patrizi (Australia) Karl Reindler	Ford BF Falcon	Ford Rising Stars Racing	156	+5 laps	20	96
20	16	(Australia) Paul Dumbrell (Australia) Rick Kelly (Australia) David Reynolds^{1}	Holden VE Commodore	HSV Dealer Team	127	+34 laps	4	90
Ret	55	(Australia) Tony D'Alberto (Australia) Jason Bargwanna	Holden VE Commodore	Rod Nash Racing	159	Crash damage	23	
Ret	2	(New Zealand) Craig Baird (Australia) Glenn Seton	Holden VE Commodore	Holden Racing Team	146	Crash	19	
Ret	67	(United Kingdom) Matt Neal (United States) Boris Said	Holden VE Commodore	Paul Morris Motorsport	140	Spun Off	26	
Ret	33	(Australia) Lee Holdsworth (Australia) Michael Caruso	Holden VE Commodore	Garry Rogers Motorsport	139	Engine	13	
Ret	9	(New Zealand) Shane van Gisbergen (Australia) Jonathon Webb	Ford BF Falcon	Stone Brothers Racing	91	Crash	12	
Ret	12	(Australia) Cameron McConville (Australia) Andrew Jones	Holden VE Commodore	Brad Jones Racing	40	Crash damage	15	
Ret	021	(New Zealand) Kayne Scott (New Zealand) Chris Pither	Ford BF Falcon	Team Kiwi Racing	8	Chassis damage	27	
DNS	15	(Australia) Rick Kelly (New Zealand) Paul Radisich	Holden VE Commodore	HSV Dealer Team		Withdrawn		
DNS	50	(Australia) Andrew Thompson (Australia) Paul Weel	Holden VE Commodore	Paul Weel Racing		Withdrawn		

^1 - David Reynolds practiced the #16 HSV Dealer Team, before stepping aside for Rick Kelly after his car was withdrawn after a crash on Saturday.

=== Statistics ===
Fastest race lap: #4 James Courtney - 2:09.2775

== Championship standings ==
After Round 10 of 14, the top five positions in the 2008 V8 Supercar Championship Series were as follows:

Pos	No	Name	Team	Points
1	88	Jamie Whincup	Team Vodafone	2316
2	5	Mark Winterbottom	Ford Performance Racing	2283
3	1	Garth Tander	Holden Racing Team	2234
4	888	Craig Lowndes	Team Vodafone	1923
5	18	Will Davison	Jim Beam Racing	1865

== Support categories ==
The 2008 Winton round of the V8 Supercar Championship had four support categories.

Category	Round winner
Fujitsu V8 Supercars Series	John Bowe (Chevrolet Camaro)
Carrera Cup	Craig Baird (Porsche 997 GT3 Cup)
Formula Ford	Paul Laskazeski (Spectrum 011b)
Australian MINI Challenge	Jason Bargwanna (Mini Cooper S)

== Broadcast ==
The race was covered by the Seven Network for the second consecutive season. Mark Larkham made his first appearance in a commentary role, substituting for Grant Denyer.

Seven Network
Booth: Neil Crompton, Matthew White
Pit-lane: Mark Beretta, Daniel Gibson, Mark Larkham, Aaron Noonan
