= 2008 L&H 500 =

2008 V8 Supercar Championship Series

(Victoria (state)) 2008 L&H 500
Event Information
- Round 9 of 14 in the 2008 V8 Supercar Championship Series
- Date: 12–14 September 2008
- Location: Phillip Island, Victoria
- Venue: Phillip Island Grand Prix Circuit
- Weather: Fine, rain during middle of race

Results
Race 1
Distance	113 laps	500 km
Pole position	Craig Lowndes; Jamie Whincup; Triple Eight Race Engineering	74 pts
Winner	Garth Tander; Mark Skaife; Holden Racing Team	3:22:21.8273
Round Results
First	Garth Tander Mark Skaife; Holden Racing Team	252 pts
Second	Craig Lowndes Jamie Whincup; Triple Eight Race Engineering	258 pts
Third	Will Davison Steven Johnson; Dick Johnson Racing	235 pts

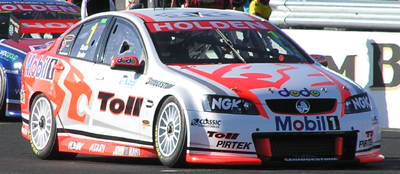
Garth Tander and Mark Skaife won the 2008 L&H 500 driving a Holden VE Commodore

The 2008 L&H 500 was the ninth round of the 2008 V8 Supercar Championship Series. It was held on the weekend of the 12 to 14 September at Phillip Island Grand Prix Circuit in Victoria. It was the eighth Phillip Island 500 and the first to be staged since 1977. The L&H 500 saw the Phillip Island Grand Prix Circuit replace Sandown Raceway as the venue of the annual 500 kilometre two-driver V8 Supercar race. In an innovation for this round, two preliminary 14 lap races were held on Saturday with the two drivers of each car starting one race each. A single pitstop by each car in either race was mandated with the combined results of the two races determining the grid for the main 500 kilometre event.

After a late race error in Sunday's race from Jamie Whincup, Garth Tander swept by to take the win. Co-driver Mark Skaife became the first driver to win the 500 kilometre co-driver endurance race at three different venues, having previously won the 2000 Ozemail Queensland 500 and the Sandown 500 in 1989 and 2003.

== Qualifying ==
Qualifying was held on Saturday 13 September 2008.

== Driver A Race ==
The first race was held on Saturday 13 September 2008.

== Driver B Race ==
The first race was held on Saturday 13 September 2008.

== 500km Race ==
The 500 km race was held on Sunday 14 September 2008.

== Results ==
=== Driver A Qualifying ===
Pos	No	Name	Car	Team	Time
1	6	(Australia) Mark Winterbottom	Ford BF Falcon	Ford Performance Racing	1:33.4117
2	888	(Australia) Craig Lowndes	Ford BF Falcon	Triple Eight Race Engineering	1:33.7058
3	25	(Australia) Jason Bright	Ford BF Falcon	Britek Motorsport	1:33.8180
4	111	(New Zealand) Fabian Coulthard	Ford BF Falcon	Paul Cruickshank Racing	1:33.8525
5	17	(Australia) Steve Owen	Ford BF Falcon	Dick Johnson Racing	1:33.9063
6	15	(Australia) Rick Kelly	Holden VE Commodore	HSV Dealer Team	1:33.9633
7	1	(Australia) Mark Skaife	Holden VE Commodore	Holden Racing Team	1:34.0875
8	18	(Australia) Steven Johnson	Ford BF Falcon	Dick Johnson Racing	1:34.0999
9	3	(New Zealand) Greg Murphy	Holden VE Commodore	Tasman Motorsport	1:34.1965
10	33	(Australia) Lee Holdsworth	Holden VE Commodore	Garry Rogers Motorsport	1:34.2222
11	5	(Australia) Dean Canto	Ford BF Falcon	Ford Performance Racing	1:34.2761
12	39	(Australia) Paul Morris	Holden VE Commodore	Paul Morris Motorsport	1:34.3733
13	34	(Australia) Greg Ritter	Holden VE Commodore	Garry Rogers Motorsport	1:34.4073
14	14	(Brazil) Max Wilson	Holden VE Commodore	Brad Jones Racing	1:34.4140
15	12	(Australia) Cameron McConville	Holden VE Commodore	Brad Jones Racing	1:34.4651
16	2	(New Zealand) Craig Baird	Holden VE Commodore	Holden Racing Team	1:34.4780
17	16	(Australia) Paul Dumbrell	Holden VE Commodore	HSV Dealer Team	1:34.5383
18	4	(Australia) David Besnard	Ford BF Falcon	Stone Brothers Racing	1:34.7104
19	50	(Australia) Andrew Thompson	Holden VE Commodore	Paul Weel Racing	1:34.8484
20	9	(Australia) Jonathon Webb	Ford BF Falcon	Stone Brothers Racing	1:34.9262
21	26	(New Zealand) Matt Halliday	Ford BF Falcon	Britek Motorsport	1:34.9289
22	55	(Australia) Jason Bargwanna	Holden VE Commodore	Rod Nash Racing	1:34.9338
23	777	(Australia) Michael Patrizi	Ford BF Falcon	Ford Rising Stars Racing	1:34.9649
24	11	(Australia) Nathan Pretty	Holden VE Commodore	Perkins Engineering	1:35.0175
25	7	(Australia) Todd Kelly	Holden VE Commodore	Perkins Engineering	1:35.0642
26	88	(United Kingdom) Marc Hynes	Ford BF Falcon	Triple Eight Race Engineering	1:35.3389
27	51	(Australia) Dale Wood	Holden VE Commodore	Tasman Motorsport	1:35.6284
28	67	(United Kingdom) Matt Neal	Holden VE Commodore	Paul Morris Motorsport	1:35.6508
DNQ	021	(New Zealand) Kayne Scott	Ford BF Falcon	Team Kiwi Racing	No time

=== Driver B Qualifying ===
Pos	No	Name	Car	Team	Time
1	888	(Australia) Jamie Whincup	Ford BF Falcon	Triple Eight Race Engineering	1:33.3175
2	4	(Australia) James Courtney	Ford BF Falcon	Stone Brothers Racing	1:33.3345
3	1	(Australia) Garth Tander	Holden VE Commodore	Holden Racing Team	1:33.3444
4	18	(Australia) Will Davison	Ford BF Falcon	Dick Johnson Racing	1:33.3855
5	39	(Australia) Russell Ingall	Holden VE Commodore	Paul Morris Motorsport	1:33.7452
6	3	(New Zealand) Jason Richards	Holden VE Commodore	Tasman Motorsport	1:33.9237
7	6	(New Zealand) Steven Richards	Ford BF Falcon	Ford Performance Racing	1:33.9593
8	15	(New Zealand) Paul Radisich	Holden VE Commodore	HSV Dealer Team	1:33.9705
9	9	(New Zealand) Shane van Gisbergen	Ford BF Falcon	Stone Brothers Racing	1:33.9773
10	5	(Australia) Luke Youlden	Ford BF Falcon	Ford Performance Racing	1:34.0108
11	111	(New Zealand) John McIntyre	Ford BF Falcon	Paul Cruickshank Racing	1:34.1632
12	17	(Australia) Warren Luff	Ford BF Falcon	Dick Johnson Racing	1:34.2776
13	33	(Australia) Michael Caruso	Holden VE Commodore	Garry Rogers Motorsport	1:34.3295
14	25	(Australia) Adam Macrow	Ford BF Falcon	Britek Motorsport	1:34.3751
15	16	(Australia) David Reynolds	Holden VE Commodore	HSV Dealer Team	1:34.4218
16	26	(Australia) Marcus Marshall	Ford BF Falcon	Britek Motorsport	1:34.4308
17	12	(Australia) Andrew Jones	Holden VE Commodore	Brad Jones Racing	1:34.4762
18	2	(Australia) Glenn Seton	Holden VE Commodore	Holden Racing Team	1:34.5695
19	7	(Australia) Shane Price	Holden VE Commodore	Perkins Engineering	1:34.6744
20	34	(Australia) Steve Ellery	Holden VE Commodore	Garry Rogers Motorsport	1:34.7141
21	55	(Australia) Tony D'Alberto	Holden VE Commodore	Rod Nash Racing	1:34.8822
22	50	(Australia) Paul Weel	Holden VE Commodore	Paul Weel Racing	1:34.8873
23	88	(Italy) Fabrizio Giovanardi	Ford BF Falcon	Triple Eight Race Engineering	1:35.0100
24	777	(Australia) Grant Denyer	Ford BF Falcon	Ford Rising Stars Racing	1:35.2565
25	14	(Australia) Brad Jones	Holden VE Commodore	Brad Jones Racing	1:35.2951
26	51	(Australia) Mark Noske	Holden VE Commodore	Tasman Motorsport	1:35.3129
27	11	(Australia) Jack Perkins	Holden VE Commodore	Perkins Engineering	1:35.3472
28	67	(United States) Boris Said	Holden VE Commodore	Paul Morris Motorsport	1:35.8140
DNQ	021	(New Zealand) Chris Pither	Ford BF Falcon	Team Kiwi Racing	No time

=== Driver A Race results ===
Pos	No	Driver	Team	Laps	Grid
1	15	(Australia) Rick Kelly	HSV Dealer Team	14	6
2	17	(Australia) Steve Owen	Dick Johnson Racing	14	5
3	25	(Australia) Jason Bright	Britek Motorsport	14	3
4	111	(New Zealand) Fabian Coulthard	Paul Cruickshank Racing	14	4
5	33	(Australia) Lee Holdsworth	Garry Rogers Motorsport	14	10
6	12	(Australia) Cameron McConville	Brad Jones Racing	14	15
7	14	(Brazil) Max Wilson	Brad Jones Racing	14	14
8	55	(Australia) Jason Bargwanna	Rod Nash Racing	14	22
9	34	(Australia) Greg Ritter	Garry Rogers Motorsport	14	13
10	50	(Australia) Andrew Thompson	Paul Weel Racing	14	19
11	888	(Australia) Craig Lowndes	Triple Eight Race Engineering	14	2
12	6	(Australia) Mark Winterbottom	Ford Performance Racing	14	1
13	4	(Australia) David Besnard	Stone Brothers Racing	14	18
14	39	(Australia) Paul Morris	Paul Morris Motorsport	14	14
15	1	(Australia) Mark Skaife	Holden Racing Team	14	7
16	9	(Australia) Jonathon Webb	Stone Brothers Racing	14	20
17	3	(New Zealand) Greg Murphy	Tasman Motorsport	14	17
18	18	(Australia) Steven Johnson	Dick Johnson Racing	14	8
19	7	(Australia) Todd Kelly	Perkins Engineering	14	25
20	16	(Australia) Paul Dumbrell	HSV Dealer Team	14	17
21	11	(Australia) Nathan Pretty	Perkins Engineering	14	24
22	26	(New Zealand) Matt Halliday	Britek Motorsport	14	21
23	777	(Australia) Michael Patrizi	Ford Rising Stars Racing	14	23
24	51	(Australia) Dale Wood	Tasman Motorsport	14	27
25	67	(United Kingdom) Matt Neal	Paul Morris Motorsport	14	28
26	88	(United Kingdom) Marc Hynes	Triple Eight Race Engineering	14	26
27	2	(New Zealand) Craig Baird	Holden Racing Team	14	16
DNF	5	(Australia) Dean Canto	Ford Performance Racing	DNF	11
DNQ	021	(New Zealand) Kayne Scott	Team Kiwi Racing		

=== Driver B Race results ===
Pos	No	Driver	Team	Laps	Grid
1	888	(Australia) Jamie Whincup	Triple Eight Race Engineering	14	1
2	18	(Australia) Will Davison	Dick Johnson Racing	14	4
3	4	(Australia) James Courtney	Stone Brothers Racing	14	2
4	39	(Australia) Russell Ingall	Paul Morris Motorsport	14	5
5	9	(New Zealand) Shane van Gisbergen	Stone Brothers Racing	14	9
6	3	(New Zealand) Jason Richards	Tasman Motorsport	14	6
7	1	(Australia) Garth Tander	Holden Racing Team	14	3
8	26	(Australia) Marcus Marshall	Britek Motorsport	14	16
9	6	(New Zealand) Steven Richards	Ford Performance Racing	14	7
10	2	(Australia) Glenn Seton	Holden Racing Team	14	18
11	11	(Australia) Jack Perkins	Perkins Engineering	14	27
12	51	(Australia) Mark Noske	Tasman Motorsport	14	26
13	777	(Australia) Grant Denyer	Ford Rising Stars Racing	14	24
14	88	(Italy) Fabrizio Giovanardi	Triple Eight Race Engineering	14	23
15	67	(United States) Boris Said	Paul Morris Motorsport	14	28
16	7	(Australia) Shane Price	Perkins Engineering	14	19
17	15	(New Zealand) Paul Radisich	HSV Dealer Team	14	8
18	17	(Australia) Warren Luff	Dick Johnson Racing	14	12
19	5	(Australia) Luke Youlden	Ford Performance Racing	14	10
20	12	(Australia) Andrew Jones	Brad Jones Racing	14	17
21	33	(Australia) Michael Caruso	Garry Rogers Motorsport	14	13
22	25	(Australia) Adam Macrow	Britek Motorsport	14	14
23	111	(New Zealand) John McIntyre	Paul Cruickshank Racing	14	11
24	34	(Australia) Steve Ellery	Garry Rogers Motorsport	14	20
25	50	(Australia) Paul Weel	Paul Weel Racing	14	22
26	14	(Australia) Brad Jones	Brad Jones Racing	14	25
27	55	(Australia) Tony D'Alberto	Rod Nash Racing	13	21
28	16	(Australia) David Reynolds	HSV Dealer Team	13	15
DNQ	021	(New Zealand) Chris Pither	Team Kiwi Racing		

=== 500km race results ===
Pos	No	Driver	Team	Laps	Grid
1	1	(Australia) Garth Tander (Australia) Mark Skaife	Holden Racing Team	113	10
2	888	(Australia) Craig Lowndes (Australia) Jamie Whincup	Triple Eight Race Engineering	113	1
3	18	(Australia) Will Davison (Australia) Steven Johnson	Dick Johnson Racing	113	4
4	6	(Australia) Mark Winterbottom (New Zealand) Steven Richards	Ford Performance Racing	113	12
5	33	(Australia) Lee Holdsworth (Australia) Michael Caruso	Garry Rogers Motorsport	113	13
6	4	(Australia) James Courtney (Australia) David Besnard	Stone Brothers Racing	113	3
7	15	(Australia) Rick Kelly (New Zealand) Paul Radisich	HSV Dealer Team	113	2
8	11	(Australia) Nathan Pretty (Australia) Jack Perkins	Perkins Engineering	113	18
9	39	(Australia) Russell Ingall (Australia) Paul Morris	Paul Morris Motorsport	113	6
10	9	(New Zealand) Shane van Gisbergen (Australia) Jonathon Webb	Stone Brothers Racing	113	7
11	25	(Australia) Jason Bright (Australia) Adam Macrow	Britek Motorsport	113	8
12	34	(Australia) Greg Ritter (Australia) Steven Ellery	Garry Rogers Motorsport	113	17
13	7	(Australia) Todd Kelly (Australia) Shane Price	Perkins Engineering	112	21
14	2	(Australia) Glenn Seton (New Zealand) Craig Baird	Holden Racing Team	112	22
15	14	(Australia) Brad Jones (Brazil) Max Wilson	Brad Jones Racing	112	16
16	111	(New Zealand) Fabian Coulthard (New Zealand) John McIntyre	Paul Cruickshank Racing	112	11
17	88	(United Kingdom) Marc Hynes (Italy) Fabrizio Giovanardi	Triple Eight Race Engineering	112	25
18	777	(Australia) Michael Patrizi (Australia) Grant Denyer	Ford Rising Stars Racing	112	24
19	67	(United Kingdom) Matt Neal (United States) Boris Said	Paul Morris Motorsport	112	26
20	51	(Australia) Dale Wood (Australia) Mark Noske	Tasman Motorsport	112	23
21	26	(Australia) Marcus Marshall (New Zealand) Matt Halliday	Britek Motorsport	112	15
22	17	(Australia) Steve Owen (Australia) Warren Luff	Dick Johnson Racing	110	5
23	50	(Australia) Andrew Thompson (Australia) Paul Weel	Paul Weel Racing	110	20
24	5	(Australia) Dean Canto (Australia) Luke Youlden	Ford Performance Racing	109	28
DNF	12	(Australia) Andrew Jones (Australia) Cameron McConville	Brad Jones Racing	80	14
DNF	55	(Australia) Tony D'Alberto (Australia) Jason Bargwanna	Rod Nash Racing	80	19
DNF	16	(Australia) Paul Dumbrell (Australia) David Reynolds	HSV Dealer Team	65	27
DNF	3	(New Zealand) Jason Richards (New Zealand) Greg Murphy	Tasman Motorsport	12	8
DNQ	021	(New Zealand) Kayne Scott (New Zealand) Chris Pither	Team Kiwi Racing		

=== Round points ===
Each driver of each car was awarded championship points equal to the total points scored by that car over the three races. However, as with the 2008 Clipsal 500, overall round position was determined by position in the final race of the weekend rather than by total points scored in the round.

Pos.	Drivers	A Race	B Race	500	Total
1	(Australia) Mark Skaife	20		200	252
1	(Australia) Garth Tander		32	200	252
2	(Australia) Craig Lowndes	24		184	258
2	(Australia) Jamie Whincup		50	184	258
3	(Australia) Steven Johnson	17		172	235
3	(Australia) Will Davison		46	172	235
4	(Australia) Mark Winterbottom	23		160	211
4	(New Zealand) Steven Richards		28	160	211
5	(Australia) Lee Holdsworth	37		148	199
5	(Australia) Michael Caruso		14	148	199
6	(Australia) David Besnard	22		136	201
6	(Australia) James Courtney		43	136	201
7	(Australia) Rick Kelly	50		128	196
7	(New Zealand) Paul Radisich		18	128	196
8	(Australia) Nathan Pretty	14		120	158
8	(Australia) Jack Perkins		24	120	158
9	(Australia) Paul Morris	21		112	173
9	(Australia) Russell Ingall		40	112	173
10	(Australia) Jonathon Webb	19		104	160
10	(New Zealand) Shane van Gisbergen		37	104	160
11	(Australia) Jason Bright	43		96	152
11	(Australia) Adam Macrow		13	96	152
12	(Australia) Greg Ritter	28		92	131
12	(Australia) Steven Ellery		11	92	131
13	(Australia) Todd Kelly	16		88	123
13	(Australia) Shane Price		19	88	123
14	(New Zealand) Craig Baird	8		84	118
14	(Australia) Glenn Seton		26	84	118
15	(Brazil) Max Wilson	32		80	121
15	(Australia) Brad Jones		9	80	121
16	(New Zealand) Fabian Coulthard	40		76	128
16	(New Zealand) John McIntyre		12	76	128
17	(United Kingdom) Marc Hynes	9		72	102
17	(Italy) Fabrizio Giovanardi		21	72	102
18	(Australia) Michael Patrizi	12		68	102
18	(Australia) Grant Denyer		22	68	102
19	(United Kingdom) Matt Neal	10		64	94
19	(United States) Boris Said		20	64	94
20	(Australia) Dale Wood	11		60	94
20	(Australia) Mark Noske		23	60	94
21	(New Zealand) Matt Halliday	13		56	99
21	(Australia) Marcus Marshall		30	56	99
22	(Australia) Steve Owen	46		52	115
22	(Australia) Warren Luff		17	52	115
23	(Australia) Andrew Thompson	26		48	84
23	(Australia) Paul Weel		10	48	84
24	(Australia) Dean Canto	Ret		44	60
24	(Australia) Luke Youlden		16	44	60
DNF	(Australia) Cameron McConville	34		Ret	49
DNF	(Australia) Andrew Jones		15	Ret	49
DNF	(Australia) Jason Bargwanna	30		Ret	38
DNF	(Australia) Tony D'Alberto		8	Ret	38
DNF	(Australia) Paul Dumbrell	15		Ret	22
DNF	(Australia) David Reynolds		7	Ret	22
DNF	(New Zealand) Greg Murphy	18		Ret	52
DNF	(New Zealand) Jason Richards		34	Ret	52
DNQ	(New Zealand) Kayne Scott	DNQ		DNQ	
DNQ	(New Zealand) Chris Pither		DNQ	DNQ	

== Standings ==
After round 9 of 14.

Pos	No	Name	Team	Points
1	1	(Australia) Garth Tander	Holden Racing Team	2096
2	5	(Australia) Mark Winterbottom	Ford Performance Racing	2043
3	88	(Australia) Jamie Whincup	Triple Eight Race Engineering	2016
4	15	(Australia) Rick Kelly	HSV Dealer Team	1702
5	18	(Australia) Will Davison	Dick Johnson Racing	1661

== Support categories ==
The Phillip Island round of the 2008 V8 Supercar Championship Series had four support categories.

Category	Round winner
Carrera Cup	Craig Baird (Porsche 997 GT3 Cup)
Formula Ford	Paul Laskazeski (Spectrum 011b)
Touring Car Masters	John Bowe (Chevrolet Camaro)
Australian Mini Challenge	Jason Bargwanna (Mini Cooper S)
