= Steven Ellery =

Australian racing driver

Steve Ellery
- Nationality: (Australia) Australian
- Born: 22 August 1974 (age 52) Melbourne, Australia
- Retired: 2008

ATCC / V8 Supercar
- Years active: 1996-2008
- Teams: Steven Ellery Racing; Longhurst Racing; Gibson Motorsport; Dick Johnson Racing; Triple Eight Race Engineering; Paul Morris Motorsport; Garry Rogers Motorsport
- Starts: 121
- Wins: 1
- Best finish: 9th in 2001

Previous series
- 1992-93 1994-95 2007: Formula Ford Australia; Australian Super Touring; Carrera Cup Australia

Steven Bruce Ellery (born 22 August 1974 in Melbourne) is a retired Australian racing driver known from V8 Supercars.

== Racing history ==
=== Early career ===
Ellery started racing in karts before graduation to Formula Ford in 1992. After running near the front of the Formula Ford pack racing a Van Diemen in 1993 Ellery moved his family-run team into the Australian Manufacturers' Championship (later known as the Australian Super Touring Championship), driving first a Ford Sierra in 1994 then a BMW 318i in 1995. Ellery's appearance in an ex-Glenn Seton Racing Ford Sierra at the Amaroo Park Australian Touring Car Championship (ATCC) round in 1994 remains the most recent entry of a non-V8 powered car in the championship.

=== ATCC / V8 Supercars ===
After two Bathurst 1000 starts in 1993 and 1994, Ellery entered the ATCC full-time in 1996 with his eponymous team, finishing 15th in the championship. He then joined Longhurst Racing for the post-season endurance races in 1996, finishing 4th at the Sandown 500 and 3rd at the Bathurst 1000 with Tony Longhurst. He continued with the team in 1997, as the team expanded to two cars with a second Ford EL Falcon. After a falling out with Longhurst, he then raced a Holden Young Lions Holden VS Commodore, prepared by Gibson Motorsport, in 1998.

His time away from the family team proved to be short-lived with Ellery again choosing to team up with his father Bruce from 1999 onwards, the team contesting a partial campaign of the championship with backing from family company Chelgrave Contracting. Ellery did however take a pole position at the non-championship event supporting the Gold Coast Indy 300. Ellery joined Dick Johnson Racing for the 1999 endurance events, now part of the championship, and co-driver Paul Radisich was leading the 1999 FAI 1000 with under 20 laps to go before a flat tyre put them out of the race.

In 2000, Ellery, now with Supercheap Auto backing, won the second race of the Sandown round, what proved to be his only championship race victory. Ellery continued with his team until 2004, with a best finish of 9th in the championship in 2001. The team's highlight was a double podium for Ellery and Luke Youlden at the two major endurance races in 2003, second at Sandown and third at Bathurst. In 2005, Ellery was selected to partner Craig Lowndes at Triple Eight Race Engineering in a two-year deal. While Lowndes mounted a championship challenge, Ellery only finished 13th in the championship with one podium at the 2005 Bathurst 1000. He was replaced after only one year for 2006 by Jamie Whincup and never returned as a full-time driver in the series.

Over the next three years, Ellery drove with Paul Morris Motorsport and Garry Rogers Motorsport as an endurance co-driver before stepping away from the sport.

=== Other racing ===
Ellery entered the first four rounds of the 2007 Australian Carrera Cup Championship before dropping out of the championship.

== Business ==
Ellery is the chief executive officer of his family labour contracting business.

== Career results ==
Season	Series	Position	Car	Team
1992	Motorcraft Formula Ford Driver to Europe Series	15th	Van Diemen RF91 Ford	Steven Ellery Racing
1993	Australian Formula Ford Championship	6th	Van Diemen RF93 Ford	Steven Ellery Racing
1994	Australian Manufacturers' Championship	4th	Ford Sierra RS	Steven Ellery Racing
1995	Australian Super Touring Championship	6th	BMW 318i	Steven Ellery Racing
1996	Australian Touring Car Championship	15th	Ford EF Falcon	Steven Ellery Racing
1997	Australian Touring Car Championship	18th	Ford EL Falcon	Longhurst Racing
1998	Australian Touring Car Championship	15th	Holden VS Commodore	Holden Young Lions
1999	Shell Championship Series	35th	Ford EL Falcon; Ford AU Falcon	Steven Ellery Racing; Dick Johnson Racing
2000	Shell Championship Series	21st	Ford AU Falcon	Steven Ellery Racing
2001	Shell Championship Series	9th	Ford AU Falcon	Steven Ellery Racing
2002	V8 Supercar Championship Series	21st	Ford AU Falcon	Steven Ellery Racing
2003	V8 Supercar Championship Series	19th	Ford BA Falcon	Steven Ellery Racing
2004	V8 Supercar Championship Series	25th	Ford BA Falcon	Steven Ellery Racing
2005	V8 Supercar Championship Series	13th	Ford BA Falcon	Triple Eight Race Engineering
2006	V8 Supercar Championship Series	31st	Holden VZ Commodore	Paul Morris Motorsport
2007	Australian Carrera Cup Championship	16th	Porsche 997 GT3 Cup	Sherrin Motorsport
2007	V8 Supercar Championship Series	48th	Holden VZ Commodore; Holden VE Commodore	Paul Morris Motorsport
2008	V8 Supercar Championship Series	40th	Holden VE Commodore	Garry Rogers Motorsport

=== Supercars Championship results ===
(Races in bold indicate pole position) (Races in italics indicate fastest lap)

Supercars results
Year	Team	Car	1	2	3	4	5	6	7	8	9	10	11	12	13	14	15	16	17	18	19	20	21	22	23	24	25	26	27	28	29	30	31	32	33	34	35	36	37	38	39	Position	Points
1996	Steven Ellery Racing	Ford Falcon (EF)	EAS; R1; 15	EAS; R2; 11	EAS; R3; 12	SAN; R4; 17	SAN; R5; 14	SAN; R6; 10	BAT; R7; 14	BAT; R8; 11	BAT; R9; 16	SYM; R10; 11	SYM; R11; 12	SYM; R12; 10	PHI; R13; 14	PHI; R14; 7	PHI; R15; 7	CAL; R16; 15	CAL; R17; 10	CAL; R18; 13	LAK; R19; Ret	LAK; R20; Ret	LAK; R21; 13	BAR; R22; 11	BAR; R23; 10	BAR; R24; 8	MAL; R25; Ret	MAL; R26; DNS	MAL; R27; 7	ORA; R28; 24	ORA; R29; 18	ORA; R30; 9										15th	28
1997	Longhurst Racing	Ford Falcon (EL)	CAL; R1; 24	CAL; R2; 9	CAL; R3; 8	PHI; R4; 10	PHI; R5; 16	PHI; R6; 16	SAN; R7; Ret	SAN; R8; 13	SAN; R9; Ret	SYM; R10; 12	SYM; R11; 12	SYM; R12; 11	WIN; R13	WIN; R14	WIN; R15	EAS; R16	EAS; R17	EAS; R18	LAK; R19	LAK; R20	LAK; R21	BAR; R22	BAR; R23	BAR; R24	MAL; R25	MAL; R26	MAL; R27	ORA; R28	ORA; R29	ORA; R30										18th	58
1998	Holden Young Lions	Holden Commodore (VS)	SAN; R1; 12	SAN; R2; Ret	SAN; R3; 11	SYM; R4; 18	SYM; R5; Ret	SYM; R6; 17	LAK; R7; 12	LAK; R8; 10	LAK; R9; Ret	PHI; R10; 29	PHI; R11; 16	PHI; R12; 30	WIN; R13; 14	WIN; R14; 12	WIN; R15; 8	MAL; R16; 13	MAL; R17; 18	MAL; R18; 24	BAR; R19; 14	BAR; R20; 14	BAR; R21; 14	CAL; R22; 14	CAL; R23; Ret	CAL; R24; C	HDV; R25; 11	HDV; R26; Ret	HDV; R27; DNS	ORA; R28; 14	ORA; R29; 11	ORA; R30; 11										15th	266
1999	Steven Ellery Racing	Ford Falcon (EL)	EAS; R1; 10	EAS; R2; 21	EAS; R3; 9	ADE; R4	BAR; R5	BAR; R6	BAR; R7	PHI; R8; 26	PHI; R9; 28	PHI; R10; 9	HDV; R11; 27	HDV; R12; 14	HDV; R13; 10	SAN; R14	SAN; R15	SAN; R16	QLD; R17; 16	QLD; R18; 12	QLD; R19; Ret	CAL; R20	CAL; R21	CAL; R22	SYM; R23	SYM; R24	SYM; R25	WIN; R26; Ret	WIN; R27; 18	WIN; R28; 18	ORA; R29; 4	ORA; R30; 6	ORA; R31; 7	QLD; R32; Ret	BAT; R33; Ret							35th	342
2000	Steven Ellery Racing	Ford Falcon (AU)	PHI; R1; Ret	PHI; R2; 13	BAR; R3; 17	BAR; R4; 13	BAR; R5; Ret	ADE; R6; Ret	ADE; R7; Ret	EAS; R8; 18	EAS; R9; 15	EAS; R10; Ret	HDV; R11; 9	HDV; R12; 9	HDV; R13; 15	CAN; R14; 22	CAN; R15; Ret	CAN; R16; Ret	QLD; R17; 15	QLD; R18; Ret	QLD; R19; 26	WIN; R20; 11	WIN; R21; 9	WIN; R22; Ret	ORA; R23; 14	ORA; R24; 24	ORA; R25; 19	CAL; R26; 7	CAL; R27; 7	CAL; R28; 20	QLD; R29; 13	SAN; R30; 4	SAN; R31; 1	SAN; R32; 2	BAT; R33; Ret							21st	406
2001	Steven Ellery Racing	Ford Falcon (AU)	PHI; R1; 11	PHI; R2; 11	ADE; R3; 5	ADE; R4; 21	EAS; R5; 26	EAS; R6; 22	HDV; R7; 8	HDV; R8; 15	HDV; R9; 17	CAN; R10; 21	CAN; R11; 16	CAN; R12; 6	BAR; R13; 15	BAR; R14; 11	BAR; R15; 21	CAL; R16; 8	CAL; R17; 9	CAL; R18; 6	ORA; R19; 14	ORA; R20; 10	QLD; R21; 6	WIN; R22; 12	WIN; R23; 8	BAT; R24; 7	PUK; R25; 19	PUK; R26; 9	PUK; R27; 12	SAN; R28; 11	SAN; R29; 10	SAN; R30; 14										9th	2073
2002	Steven Ellery Racing	Ford Falcon (AU)	ADE; R1; Ret	ADE; R2; Wth	PHI; R3; 22	PHI; R4; 24	EAS; R5; 6	EAS; R6; 21	EAS; R7; Ret	HDV; R8; 19	HDV; R9; 26	HDV; R10; 16	CAN; R11; 18	CAN; R12; 25	CAN; R13; Ret	BAR; R14; 20	BAR; R15; 26	BAR; R16; 16	ORA; R17; 6	ORA; R18; 8	WIN; R19; 30	WIN; R20; 23	QLD; R21; 14	BAT; R22; 9	SUR; R23; 11	SUR; R24; Ret	PUK; R25; 17	PUK; R26; 12	PUK; R27; Ret	SAN; R28; 10	SAN; R29; 10											21st	478
2003	Steven Ellery Racing	Ford Falcon (BA)	ADE; R1; 29	ADE; R1; DSQ	PHI; R3; 20	EAS; R4; 22	WIN; R5; 25	BAR; R6; 11	BAR; R7; 16	BAR; R8; Ret	HDV; R9; 8	HDV; R10; 15	HDV; R11; 9	QLD; R12; 14	ORA; R13; 21	SAN; R14; 2	BAT; R15; 3	SUR; R16; Ret	SUR; R17; Ret	PUK; R18; 9	PUK; R19; 21	PUK; R20; 14	EAS; R21; 24	EAS; R22; 23																		19th	1164
2004	Steven Ellery Racing	Ford Falcon (BA)	ADE; R1; Ret	ADE; R2; Ret	EAS; R3; Ret	PUK; R4; 18	PUK; R5; 26	PUK; R6; 24	HDV; R7; 21	HDV; R8; 26	HDV; R9; 18	BAR; R10; 17	BAR; R11; 9	BAR; R12; 8	QLD; R13; Ret	WIN; R14; 6	ORA; R15; 17	ORA; R16; 29	SAN; R17; 22	BAT; R18; 16	SUR; R19; 18	SUR; R20; 21	SYM; R21; 14	SYM; R22; 8	SYM; R23; 10	EAS; R24; 11	EAS; R25; 33	EAS; R26; 28														25th	991
2005	Triple Eight Race Engineering	Ford Falcon (BA)	ADE; R1; Ret	ADE; R2; DNS	PUK; R3; 4	PUK; R4; 7	PUK; R5; 22	BAR; R6; 30	BAR; R7; 13	BAR; R8; 10	EAS; R9; 28	EAS; R10; 8	SHA; R11; 15	SHA; R12; 24	SHA; R13; 27	HDV; R14; 28	HDV; R15; 13	HDV; R16; 6	QLD; R17; 7	ORA; R18; Wth	ORA; R19; Wth	SAN; R20; 5	BAT; R21; 3	SUR; R22; 7	SUR; R23; 7	SUR; R24; 7	SYM; R25; 9	SYM; R26; 13	SYM; R27; 18	PHI; R28; 8	PHI; R29; 6	PHI; R30; 10										13th	1424
2006	Paul Morris Motorsport	Holden Commodore (VZ)	ADE; R1	ADE; R2	PUK; R3	PUK; R4	PUK; R5	BAR; R6	BAR; R7	BAR; R8	WIN; R9	WIN; R10	WIN; R11	HDV; R12; 27	HDV; R13; 15	HDV; R14; Ret	QLD; R15; 29	QLD; R16; 26	QLD; R17; 22	ORA; R18	ORA; R19	ORA; R20	SAN; R21; 8	BAT; R22; 6	SUR; R23	SUR; R24	SUR; R25	SYM; R26	SYM; R27	SYM; R28	BHR; R29	BHR; R30	BHR; R31	PHI; R32	PHI; R33	PHI; R34						31st	594
2007	Paul Morris Motorsport	Holden Commodore (VE)	ADE; R1	ADE; R2	BAR; R3	BAR; R4	BAR; R5	PUK; R6	PUK; R7	PUK; R8	WIN; R9	WIN; R10	WIN; R11	EAS; R12	EAS; R13	EAS; R14	HDV; R15	HDV; R16	HDV; R17	QLD; R18; 20	QLD; R19; 25	QLD; R20; Ret	ORA; R21	ORA; R22	ORA; R23	SAN; R24; 15	BAT; R25; Ret	SUR; R26	SUR; R27	SUR; R28	BHR; R29	BHR; R30	BHR; R31	SYM; R32	SYM; R33	SYM; R34	PHI; R35	PHI; R36	PHI; R37			48th	6
2008	Garry Rogers Motorsport	Holden Commodore (VE)	ADE; R1	ADE; R2	EAS; R3	EAS; R4	EAS; R5	HAM; R6	HAM; R7	HAM; R8	BAR; R9	BAR; R10	BAR; R11	SAN; R12	SAN; R13	SAN; R14	HDV; R15	HDV; R16	HDV; R17	QLD; R18	QLD; R19	QLD; R20	WIN; R21	WIN; R22	WIN; R23	PHI; Q 24	PHI; R24; 12	BAT; R25; 16	SUR; R26	SUR; R27	SUR; R28	BHR; R29	BHR; R30	BHR; R31	SYM; R32	SYM; R33	SYM; R34	ORA; R35	ORA; R36	ORA; R37		40th	245

=== Complete Bathurst 1000 results ===
Year	No.	Team	Car	Co-driver	Position	Laps
1993	77	Phoenix Motorsport	Ford Sierra	(Australia) Gary Gosatti	DNF	62
1994	10	Phil Ward Racing	Holden VP Commodore	(Australia) Phil Ward	NC	100
1996	25	Longhurst Racing	Ford EF Falcon	(Australia) Tony Longhurst	**3rd**	161
1997	45	Gibson Motorsport	Holden VS Commodore	(Australia) Darren Hossack	6th	154
1998	24	Romano Racing	Holden VS Commodore	(Australia) Paul Romano	12th	151
1999	18	Dick Johnson Racing	Ford AU Falcon	(New Zealand) Paul Radisich	DNF	147
2000	31	Steven Ellery Racing	Ford AU Falcon	(Australia) Paul Stokell	DNF	82
2001	31	Steven Ellery Racing	Ford AU Falcon	(Australia) Geoff Brabham	7th	161
2002	31	Steven Ellery Racing	Ford AU Falcon	(Australia) Luke Youlden	9th	160
2003	31	Steven Ellery Racing	Ford BA Falcon	(Australia) Luke Youlden	**3rd**	161
2004	31	Steven Ellery Racing	Ford BA Falcon	(Australia) Luke Youlden	16th	158
2005	88	Triple Eight Race Engineering	Ford BA Falcon	(Australia) Adam Macrow	**3rd**	161
2006	67	Paul Morris Motorsport	Holden VZ Commodore	(Australia) Paul Morris	6th	161
2007	67	Paul Morris Motorsport	Holden VE Commodore	(Australia) Paul Morris	DNF	145
2008	34	Garry Rogers Motorsport	Holden VE Commodore	(Australia) Greg Ritter	16th	157
