= 2003 Sandown 500 =

2003 Supercar Championship event

(Victoria (state)) 2003 Sandown 500
Event Information
- Round 9 of 13 in the 2003 V8 Supercar Championship Series
- Date: 12–14 September 2003
- Location: Melbourne, Victoria
- Venue: Sandown International Raceway
- Weather: Mixed

Results
Race 1
Distance	141 laps	437 km
Pole position	Marcos Ambrose; Stone Brothers Racing	1:11.8554
Winner	Mark Skaife; Todd Kelly; Holden Racing Team	3:26:50.4750
Round Results
First	Mark Skaife Todd Kelly; Holden Racing Team	192 pts
Second	Steven Ellery Luke Youlden; Steven Ellery Racing	188 pts
Third	Greg Murphy Rick Kelly; John Kelly Racing	184 pts

The 2003 Sandown 500 (known for naming rights reasons as the 2003 Betta Electrical Sandown 500) was an endurance race for V8 Supercars and served as the ninth round of the 2003 V8 Supercar Championship Series. It was held on the weekend of 12 to 14 September at the Sandown Raceway in Melbourne, Victoria. The race was scheduled for 161 laps at a distance of 500 kilometers. Through the effects of the weather and a support race incident that delayed the start by 19 minutes, the race would be declared at 141 laps.

In a race marred by tumultuous conditions, Mark Skaife and Todd Kelly secured victory as their competitors fell by the wayside throughout the race. The Stone Brothers Racing outfit of Marcos Ambrose and Russell Ingall entered the weekend as the combination to beat. After claiming pole position by nearly half a second and storming out to an early lead, the pairing appeared to be in the box seat for victory. However, the campaign would be dashed when Ingall spun into the gravel trap immediately after jumping into the car owing to his failure to bring the brake pedal up to pressure after the brake pads had been changed. The race was also notable for the late-race charge by Jason Richards who almost pulled off a major upset victory for Team Dynamik before understeering into the gravel with two laps remaining.

== Background ==
The event was held on the weekend of 12 to 14 September 2003. It was the 36th running of the Sandown 500, the first to be held as a championship event in the modern era, and consisted of one 500 km race with two compulsory pitstops for fuel and tyres.

=== Entry list ===
There were 35 drivers entered into the event. It featured mixture of vehicle models - three AU Ford Falcon's, fourteen BA Falcon's, seven VY Commodore's, and ten VX Commodore's.

Preceding the event, British-based Triple Eight Race Engineering had bought the Briggs Motorsport team and assumed operations following the previous round in Oran Park.

The Garry Rogers Motorsport entry of Garth Tander and Nathan Pretty featured the controversial 'x-bar' within the car. All cars were already fitted with what was known as the 'Larry bar' - a rollbar that ran diagonally across the car for chassis rigidity. The x-bar featured an additional bar which essentially mirrored the Larry bar, creating an x-formation and gave the chassis more rigidity and speed.

Multiple entrants sported special liveries for this event. The Stone Brothers Racing cars featured split liveries with team sponsors Pirtek and Caltex Havoline. The Holden Racing Team cars featured a special Mobil 1 promotion on the bonnets.

This event would also mark the series debut for multiple drivers including Mark Winterbottom, Allan Simonsen, Nicolas Minassian, Andy McElrea, Brett Peters, Kerry Wade, Marcus Marshall and Rickard Rydell.

== Race report ==
=== Qualifying ===
Paul Radisich took an emotional provisional pole position by less than one hundredth of a second over Mark Skaife. This marked Triple Eight Race Engineering's first pole position since entering the sport earlier that weekend and Radisich's first provisional pole position since 2001.

Pos.	No.	Driver	Entrant	Car	Time
1	65	(New Zealand) Paul Radisich	Triple Eight Race Engineering	Ford Falcon (BA)	1:11.0674
2	1	(Australia) Mark Skaife	Holden Racing Team	Holden Commodore (VY)	1:11.0708
3	4	(Australia) Marcos Ambrose	Stone Brothers Racing	Ford Falcon (BA)	1:11.0955
4	51	(New Zealand) Greg Murphy	John Kelly Racing	Holden Commodore (VY)	1:11.2962
5	31	(Australia) Steven Ellery	Steven Ellery Racing	Ford Falcon (BA)	1:11.3779
6	44	(New Zealand) Simon Wills	Team Dynamik	Holden Commodore (VY)	1:11.4141
7	17	(Australia) Steven Johnson	Dick Johnson Racing	Ford Falcon (BA)	1:11.4766
8	21	(Australia) John Bowe	Brad Jones Racing	Ford Falcon (BA)	1:11.5216
9	29	(Australia) Paul Morris	Paul Morris Motorsport	Holden Commodore (VY)	1:11.5375
10	6	(Australia) Craig Lowndes	Ford Performance Racing	Ford Falcon (BA)	1:11.5527
11	34	(Australia) Garth Tander	Garry Rogers Motorsport	Holden Commodore (VY)	1:11.5914
12	18	(Brazil) Max Wilson	Dick Johnson Racing	Ford Falcon (BA)	1:11.6493
13	50	(Australia) Jason Bright	Paul Weel Racing	Holden Commodore (VX)	1:11.6521
14	9	(Australia) Mark Winterbottom	Stone Brothers Racing	Ford Falcon (BA)	1:11.7148
15	15	(United Kingdom) Andy Priaulx	John Kelly Racing	Holden Commodore (VX)	1:11.7584
16	021	(New Zealand) Craig Baird	Team Kiwi Racing	Holden Commodore (VX)	1:11.7841
17	10	(Australia) Mark Larkham	Larkham Motorsport	Ford Falcon (BA)	1:11.7869
18	66	(Australia) Dean Canto	Triple Eight Race Engineering	Ford Falcon (BA)	1:11.8689
19	888	(Australia) Andrew Jones	Brad Jones Racing	Ford Falcon (BA)	1:11.8935
20	16	(Australia) Greg Ritter	Paul Weel Racing	Holden Commodore (VX)	1:11.9202
21	11	(New Zealand) Steven Richards	Perkins Engineering	Holden Commodore (VY)	1:11.9703
22	5	(Australia) Adam Macrow	Ford Performance Racing	Ford Falcon (BA)	1:11.9750
23	19	(Australia) David Besnard	Rod Nash Racing	Ford Falcon (BA)	1:11.9948
24	8	(Australia) Paul Dumbrell	Perkins Engineering	Holden Commodore (VX)	1:12.0768
25	3	(Australia) Cameron McConville	Lansvale Racing Team	Holden Commodore (VX)	1:12.1924
26	2	(Australia) Tony Longhurst	Holden Racing Team	Holden Commodore (VY)	1:12.2192
27	45	(France) Nicolas Minassian	Team Dynamik	Holden Commodore (VY)	1:12.2794
28	33	(Australia) Jamie Whincup	Garry Rogers Motorsport	Holden Commodore (VX)	1:12.6031
29	75	(Australia) Anthony Tratt	Paul Little Racing	Ford Falcon (BA)	1:12.7129
30	13	(Australia) Steve Owen	Robert Smith Racing	Holden Commodore (VX)	1:12.8101
31	20	(Australia) Grant Johnson	Larkham Motorsport	Ford Falcon (AU)	1:13.0534
32	23	(Australia) Neal Bates	Noske Motorsport	Ford Falcon (AU)	1:13.3314
33	46	(Australia) Dale Brede	John Faulkner Racing	Holden Commodore (VX)	1:13.9016
34	24	(Australia) Alan Gurr	Paul Morris Motorsport	Holden Commodore (VX)	1:13.9372
35	99	(New Zealand) David Thexton	Thexton Motor Racing	Ford Falcon (AU)	1:15.4804

=== Top ten shootout ===
Pos.	No.	Driver	Entrant	Car	Time
1	4	(Australia) Marcos Ambrose	Stone Brothers Racing	Ford Falcon (BA)	1:11.8554
2	1	(Australia) Mark Skaife	Holden Racing Team	Holden Commodore (VY)	1:12.2797
3	51	(New Zealand) Greg Murphy	John Kelly Racing	Holden Commodore (VY)	1:12.3744
4	65	(New Zealand) Paul Radisich	Triple Eight Race Engineering	Ford Falcon (BA)	1:12.6438
5	44	(New Zealand) Simon Wills	Team Dynamik	Holden Commodore (VY)	1:12.6448
6	17	(Australia) Steven Johnson	Dick Johnson Racing	Ford Falcon (BA)	1:12.6711
7	6	(Australia) Craig Lowndes	Ford Performance Racing	Ford Falcon (BA)	1:12.6823
8	21	(Australia) John Bowe	Brad Jones Racing	Ford Falcon (BA)	1:12.9444
9	31	(Australia) Steven Ellery	Steven Ellery Racing	Ford Falcon (BA)	1:20.6263
EXC	29	(Australia) Paul Morris	Paul Morris Motorsport	Holden Commodore (VY)	Excluded

=== Race ===
The start of the race was delayed by 19 minutes owing to a crash in the Historic Touring Cars support race that necessitated barrier repairs at turn one. Glenn Seton would start from the pitlane after encountering a misfire during the reconnaissance lap. Despite their efforts, the problem would persist throughout the race.

Under the ominous cover of dark clouds, Todd Kelly bogged down off the line, dropped to fifth position and Marcos Ambrose led the pack into turn one. At the start of lap four, Kelly began his recovery drive by passing Jason Richards for fourth. Later on the same lap, Garth Tander spun Steven Johnson on the approach to Dandenong Road Corner. Johnson then made contact with the side of Brad Jones and the Dick Johnson Racing Falcon was left stranded on the apex of the corner. In the melee, the second Dick Johnson Racing car of Max Wilson was spun into the side of his teammate, causing additional damage to both cars and sending them down to the back of the pack. Both cars would soon return to the pitlane for repairs. Kelly moved up to third, past Radisich, on lap 7 at turn one. For his role in the accident, Tander was issued a stop-go penalty. At the same time, the first reports of rain at the circuit were issued. Two laps later, Kelly moved past brother Rick Kelly at turn one to move back into second place. On lap 13, Cameron McConville retired from the race after encountering engine issues.

Todd Kelly began to chip away at Ambrose's lead. Within a few laps, Kelly had whittled down the gap to less than a second. Behind them, Radisich and Rick Kelly came to blows at the final corner which saw the latter pitched into a spin. Multiple penalties were issued in this time. David Besnard would be issued a drive-through penalty for spinning Brad Jones at Dandenong Road Corner while Greg Ritter was issued one for kerb-hopping. By lap 40, the rain had arrived and teams began scrambling to pit their cars. Ambrose elected to pit from the lead while Kelly continued on. Three laps later, Kelly slid wide at the penultimate corner and almost became bunkered in the gravel trap such was the lack of grip on the circuit. After pitting for wet weather tyres immediately thereafter, Ambrose resumed the lead. Jason Bright also attempted to persist with slick tyres. But mere laps later, Bright made contact with the wall, causing substantial damage to the front-end of the car. The Team Kiwi Racing entry retired from the race on lap 54 when the engine expired.

On lap 68, Todd Kelly pitted and handed the reigns over to co-driver, Mark Skaife. The next lap, Ambrose made his pitstop and stepped aside for Russell Ingall. During the pitstop, Stone Brothers Racing made a brakepad change on the car. Upon exiting the pitlane, Ingall, preoccupied with adjusting his seatbelts, did not bring the brake pedal up to pressure. As a result, he locked the rear brakes, pitching his car into the spin and came to rest in the gravel trap at turn one, rendering them out of contention for the win. Simon Wills almost joined him at the same point of the track after experiencing his own braking issues. With the car stranded in the gravel, the safety car was deployed with Greg Murphy having now assumed the lead. Upon the resumption of the race, Nathan Pretty was spun by John Cleland at turn one. By lap 104, the rain began to fall once again.

On lap 109, both Murphy and Skaife pitted for wet weather tyres. Upon entering his pit box, the Garry Rogers Motorsport entry of Jamie Whincup was released into the path of Murphy causing him to stop and delayed his pitstop. In the commotion to align Murphy's car in the pitbox, his rear wing had become partially dislodged after the bolts on the right-hand side had loosened and fallen out. The delay sent Murphy tumbling down the order and out of contention. A few laps later, the rain further intensified with hail hitting the circuit as well. Such was the extent of the hail that the accumulated on the track and created a sludge that made the surface virtually undriveable. As a result, the safety car was deployed. Even with the yellow flags displayed and the field having slowed to a crawl, drivers still struggled to keep their cars on the track. Paul Dumbrell speared off the track at turn five and made heavy contact with the outside wall. This forced him to retire from the race and would extend the safety car period. By this stage, it was evident that the race would not reach the 500 kilometer distance in time and the race would become time-certain.

The race resumed on lap 127 with roughly 20 minutes remaining in race time. Jason Richards began to eat into Skaife's lead at the rate of half a second per lap. Skaife begun experiencing electrical issues with his car and started turning off multiple electrical components in order to preserve the equipment and not risk a retirement. This inhibited Skaife's vision and pace, with the wipers having been turned off, and the windows began to fog. By lap 139, Richards had closed to the rear of Skaife's car and began to pressure him heavily for the lead. On lap 140, Richards attempted to pass Skaife at Dandenong Road Corner. The overtake was initially successful but he carried too much speed into the corner, slid wide and became bunkered in the gravel trap.

The race was concluded at the end of lap 141 with Mark Skaife and Todd Kelly claiming victory. Half a minute behind, second place was claimed by Luke Youlden and Steven Ellery. Despite the nightmare pitstop, Greg Murphy and Rick Kelly would claim third place and reclaimed the lead lap after having been a lap down mere minutes earlier.

Pos.	No.	Drivers	Entrant	Car	Laps	Time/Retired	Grid	Points
1	1	(Australia) Mark Skaife (Australia) Todd Kelly	Holden Racing Team	Holden Commodore (VY)	141	03:26:50.4750	2	192
2	31	(Australia) Steven Ellery (Australia) Luke Youlden	Steven Ellery Racing	Ford Falcon (BA)	141	+ 30.117	9	188
3	51	(New Zealand) Greg Murphy (Australia) Rick Kelly	John Kelly Racing	Holden Commodore (VY)	141	+ 53.053	3	184
4	21	(Australia) John Bowe (Australia) Brad Jones	Brad Jones Racing	Ford Falcon (BA)	141	+ 1:13.830	8	180
5	4	(Australia) Marcos Ambrose (Australia) Russell Ingall	Stone Brothers Racing	Ford Falcon (BA)	140	+ 1 lap	1	176
6	11	(New Zealand) Steven Richards (Australia) Larry Perkins	Perkins Engineering	Holden Commodore (VY)	140	+ 1 lap	21	172
7	65	(New Zealand) Paul Radisich (Sweden) Rickard Rydell	Triple Eight Race Engineering	Ford Falcon (BA)	140	+ 1 lap	4	168
8	19	(Australia) David Besnard (Australia) Owen Kelly	Rod Nash Racing	Ford Falcon (BA)	140	+ 1 lap	23	164
9	10	(Australia) Jason Bargwanna (Australia) Mark Larkham	Larkham Motorsport	Ford Falcon (BA)	140	+ 1 lap	17	160
10	2	(New Zealand) Jim Richards (Australia) Tony Longhurst	Holden Racing Team	Holden Commodore (VY)	140	+ 1 lap	26	156
11	9	(Australia) Mark Winterbottom (Australia) Mark Noske	Stone Brothers Racing	Ford Falcon (BA)	140	+ 1 lap	14	152
12	15	(United Kingdom) Andy Priaulx (Australia) Cameron McLean	John Kelly Racing	Holden Commodore (VY)	140	+ 1 lap	15	148
13	29	(Australia) Paul Morris (New Zealand) John Faulkner	Paul Morris Motorsport	Holden Commodore (VY)	139	+ 2 laps	10	144
14	66	(Australia) Dean Canto (Australia) Matthew White	Triple Eight Race Engineering	Ford Falcon (BA)	139	+ 2 laps	18	140
15	17	(Australia) Steven Johnson (Australia) Warren Luff	Dick Johnson Racing	Ford Falcon (BA)	139	+ 2 laps	6	136
16	6	(Australia) Craig Lowndes (Australia) Glenn Seton	Ford Performance Racing	Ford Falcon (BA)	139	+ 2 laps	PL	132
17	5	(Australia) Darren Hossack (Australia) Adam Macrow	Ford Performance Racing	Ford Falcon (BA)	139	+ 2 laps	22	128
18	34	(Australia) Garth Tander (Australia) Nathan Pretty	Garry Rogers Motorsport	Holden Commodore (VY)	138	+ 3 laps	11	124
19	18	(Brazil) Max Wilson (Australia) David Brabham	Dick Johnson Racing	Ford Falcon (BA)	138	+ 3 laps	12	120
20	888	(United Kingdom) John Cleland (Australia) Andrew Jones	Brad Jones Racing	Ford Falcon (BA)	138	+ 3 laps	19	116
21	13	(Australia) Steve Owen (Australia) Phillip Scifleet	Robert Smith Racing	Holden Commodore (VX)	137	+ 4 laps	30	112
22	16	(Australia) Greg Ritter (Australia) Marcus Marshall	Paul Weel Racing	Holden Commodore (VX)	137	+ 4 laps	20	108
23	20	(Australia) Grant Johnson (Australia) Kerry Wade	Larkham Motorsport	Ford Falcon (AU)	137	+ 4 laps	31	104
24	46	(Australia) Dale Brede (Australia) Tony Ricciardello	John Faulkner Racing	Holden VX Commodore	136	+ 5 laps	33	100
25	23	(Australia) Rick Bates (Australia) Neal Bates	Noske Motorsport	Ford Falcon (AU)	136	+ 5 laps	32	96
26	99	(New Zealand) David Thexton (Australia) Brett Peters	Thexton Motor Racing	Ford Falcon (AU)	133	+ 8 laps	35	92
27	24	(Australia) Alan Gurr (New Zealand) Andy McElrea	Paul Morris Motorsport	Holden Commodore (VX)	133	+ 8 laps	34	88
28	45	(France) Nicolas Minassian (Australia) Wayne Wakefield	Team Dynamik	Holden Commodore (VY)	132	+ 9 laps	27	84
29	33	(Australia) Jamie Whincup (Denmark) Allan Simonsen	Garry Rogers Motorsport	Holden Commodore (VX)	130	+ 11 laps	28	80
30	75	(Australia) Anthony Tratt (Australia) Paul Stokell	Paul Little Racing	Ford Falcon (BA)	128	+ 13 laps	29	76
31	50	(Australia) Jason Bright (Australia) Paul Weel	Paul Weel Racing	Holden Commodore (VX)	117	+ 24 laps	13	72
Ret	44	(New Zealand) Simon Wills (New Zealand) Jason Richards	Team Dynamik	Holden Commodore (VY)	139	Spun off	6	68
Ret	8	(Australia) Paul Dumbrell (Australia) Tomas Mezera	Perkins Engineering	Holden Commodore (VX)	113	Accident	24	
Ret	021	(New Zealand) Craig Baird (New Zealand) (Mark Porter) +	Team Kiwi Racing	Holden Commodore (VX)	54	Engine	16	
Ret	3	(Australia) Cameron McConville (Australia) (Tim Leahey) +	Lansvale Racing Team	Holden Commodore (VX)	13	Engine	25	
Fastest Lap: Mark Skaife (Holden Racing Team) - 1:12.0236 on lap 96

+ Mark Porter did not drive car 021 during the race and Tim Leahey did not drive car 3 during the race.

== Championship standings ==
Pos.	No	Driver	Team	Pts
1	4	(Australia) Marcos Ambrose	Stone Brothers Racing	1867
2	51	(New Zealand) Greg Murphy	John Kelly Racing	1795
3	9	(Australia) Russell Ingall	Stone Brothers Racing	1703
4	1	(Australia) Mark Skaife	Holden Racing Team	1681
5	6	(Australia) Craig Lowndes	Ford Performance Racing	1540
