= 2006 Supercheap Auto Bathurst 1000 =

Motor race in Australia

2006 Supercheap Auto 1000

Seasons
- ← 2005 2007 →

(New South Wales) 2006 Supercheap Auto Bathurst 1000
Event Information
- Round 9 of 13 in the 2006 V8 Supercar Championship Series
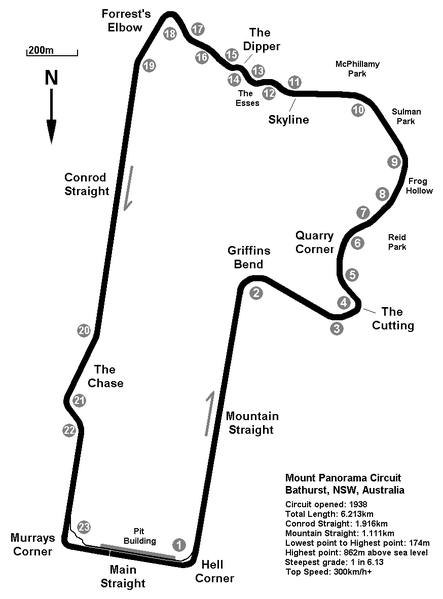
- Date: 5–8 October 2006
- Location: Bathurst, New South Wales
- Venue: Mount Panorama Circuit
- Weather: Fine

Results
Race 1
| Distance | 161 laps | 1000 km |
| Pole position | (Australia) Mark Skaife; Holden Racing Team | 2:07.4221 |
| Winner | (Australia) Craig Lowndes (Australia) Jamie Whincup; Triple Eight Race Engineering | 6:59:53.5852 |
Round Results
| First | (Australia) Craig Lowndes (Australia) Jamie Whincup; Triple Eight Race Engineering | 320 pts |
| Second | (Australia) Rick Kelly (Australia) Todd Kelly; HSV Dealer Team | 310 pts |
| Third | (Australia) James Courtney (Australia) Glenn Seton; Stone Brothers Racing | 300 pts |

The 2006 Supercheap Auto Bathurst 1000 was an endurance race for V8 Supercars, held on 8 October 2006 at the Mount Panorama Circuit near Bathurst in New South Wales, Australia. It was Round 9 of the 2006 V8 Supercar Championship Series. The event was the tenth running of the "Australia 1000" race, first held after the organisational split over the Bathurst 1000 that occurred in 1997. It was also the 49th race in a sequence of endurance events beginning with the 1960 Armstrong 500 held at Phillip Island.

The race was won by Craig Lowndes and Jamie Whincup driving a Ford Falcon (BA) entered by Team Betta Electrical. It was Whincup's first "Bathurst 1000" win following on from his second place in the 2005 Supercheap Auto 1000. Whincup became the 51st driver to win in the combined history of the race. It was Lowndes second win, achieved ten years after his 1996 AMP Bathurst 1000 victory. It was also the first "1000" win for Triple Eight Race Engineering, which first contested the event in 1997, and the first for a Ford since 1998. The race winners were awarded the Peter Brock Trophy, commemorating the recent death of nine time "Bathurst 1000" winner, Peter Brock.

== Entry list ==
31 cars were entered for the race, with 15 of them Ford Falcons and 16 Holden Commodores. 2005 winners Mark Skaife and Todd Kelly were split between the two factory Holden teams, despite racing as team-mates during the regular season.

| No. | Drivers | Team | Car | No. | Drivers | Team | Car |
|---|---|---|---|---|---|---|---|
| 1 | (Australia) Russell Ingall (Australia) Luke Youlden | Stone Brothers Racing (Caltex) | Ford Falcon (BA) | 20 | (Australia) Marcus Marshall (Australia) Jonathon Webb | Paul Cruickshank Racing (Glenfords Tools) | Ford Falcon (BA) |
| 2 | (Australia) Mark Skaife (Australia) Garth Tander | Holden Racing Team (Holden, Mobil 1) | Holden Commodore (VZ) | 021 | (New Zealand) Paul Radisich (New Zealand) Fabian Coulthard | Team Kiwi Racing (Makita) | Holden Commodore (VZ) |
| 3 | (New Zealand) Jason Richards (Australia) Andrew Jones | Tasman Motorsport (Firepower) | Holden Commodore (VZ) | 22 | (New Zealand) Jim Richards (Australia) Ryan Briscoe | Holden Racing Team (Holden, Mobil 1) | Holden Commodore (VZ) |
| 4 | (Australia) James Courtney (Australia) Glenn Seton | Stone Brothers Racing (Jeld-Wen) | Ford Falcon (BA) | 23 | (Australia) Owen Kelly (Australia) Mark Noske | Tasman Motorsport (Firepower) | Holden Commodore (VZ) |
| 5 | (Australia) David Brabham (New Zealand) Matthew Halliday | Ford Performance Racing (Ford Credit) | Ford Falcon (BA) | 25 | (Australia) Warren Luff (Australia) Adam Macrow | Britek Motorsport (Fujitsu, Talladega Nights) | Ford Falcon (BA) |
| 6 | (Australia) Jason Bright (Australia) Mark Winterbottom | Ford Performance Racing (Caterpillar) | Ford Falcon (BA) | 26 | (Australia) José Fernández (Australia) Tony Ricciardello | Britek Motorsport (Fujitsu, Talladega Nights) | Ford Falcon (BA) |
| 7 | (New Zealand) Steven Richards (Australia) Paul Dumbrell | Perkins Engineering (Jack Daniel's) | Holden Commodore (VZ) | 33 | (Australia) Greg Ritter (Australia) Cameron McLean | Garry Rogers Motorsport (Valvoline, Repco) | Holden Commodore (VZ) |
| 8 | (Brazil) Max Wilson (Australia) David Besnard | WPS Racing (WPS Financial Services) | Ford Falcon (BA) | 34 | (Australia) Dean Canto (Australia) Lee Holdsworth | Garry Rogers Motorsport (Valvoline, Repco) | Holden Commodore (VZ) |
| 10 | (Australia) Jason Bargwanna (New Zealand) Craig Baird | WPS Racing (WPS Financial Services) | Ford Falcon (BA) | 39 | (Australia) Alan Gurr (New Zealand) Kayne Scott | Paul Morris Motorsport (Sirromet Wines) | Holden Commodore (VZ) |
| 11 | (Australia) Jack Perkins (Australia) Shane Price | Perkins Engineering (Jack Daniel's) | Holden Commodore (VZ) | 50 | (Australia) Paul Weel (Australia) Nathan Pretty | Paul Weel Racing (Supercheap Auto) | Holden Commodore (VZ) |
| 12 | (New Zealand) Mark Porter (Australia) Dale Brede | Brad Jones Racing (BOC Gas and Gear) | Ford Falcon (BA) | 51 | (New Zealand) Greg Murphy (Australia) Cameron McConville | Paul Weel Racing (Supercheap Auto) | Holden Commodore (VZ) |
| 14 | (Australia) Brad Jones (Australia) John Bowe | Brad Jones Racing (BOC Gas and Gear) | Ford Falcon (BA) | 55 | (Australia) Steve Owen (Australia) Tony Longhurst | Rod Nash Racing (Autobarn) | Holden Commodore (VZ) |
| 15 | (Australia) Rick Kelly (Australia) Todd Kelly | HSV Dealer Team (HSV, Toll) | Holden Commodore (VZ) | 67 | (Australia) Paul Morris (Australia) Steve Ellery | Paul Morris Motorsport (Sirromet Wines) | Holden Commodore (VZ) |
| 16 | (Australia) Anthony Tratt (Australia) Tony D'Alberto | HSV Dealer Team (HSV, Toll) | Holden Commodore (VZ) | 88 | (United Kingdom) Richard Lyons (Denmark) Allan Simonsen | Triple Eight Race Engineering (Betta Electrical) | Ford Falcon (BA) |
| 17 | (Australia) Steven Johnson (Australia) Will Davison | Dick Johnson Racing (FirstRock Home Loans) | Ford Falcon (BA) | 888 | (Australia) Craig Lowndes (Australia) Jamie Whincup | Triple Eight Race Engineering (Betta Electrical) | Ford Falcon (BA) |
| 18 | (Australia) Alex Davison (Australia) Grant Denyer | Dick Johnson Racing (Accor Premiere Vacation Club) | Ford Falcon (BA) | | | | |

== Support race accident ==
During Race 1 of the Fujitsu V8 Supercars Series There was a multiple-car crash involving Mark Porter, who was seriously injured and passed away on the Sunday afternoon, after the race. Porter qualified the #12 Falcon for Brad Jones Racing. His name was left on the window of the BJR Falcon as a mark of respect.

== Qualifying ==
=== Qualifying ===
| Pos. | No. | Driver | Team | Car | Time | Gap | Grid |
|---|---|---|---|---|---|---|---|
| 1 | 2 | (Australia) Mark Skaife | Holden Racing Team | Holden Commodore (VZ) | 2:06.9764 | | Top 10 |
| 2 | 6 | (Australia) Jason Bright | Ford Performance Racing | Ford Falcon (BA) | 2:07.0967 | +0.1203 | Top 10 |
| 3 | 15 | (Australia) Rick Kelly | HSV Dealer Team | Holden Commodore (VZ) | 2:07.6780 | +0.7016 | Top 10 |
| 4 | 3 | (New Zealand) Jason Richards | Tasman Motorsport | Holden Commodore (VZ) | 2:07.6922 | +0.7158 | Top 10 |
| 5 | 51 | (New Zealand) Greg Murphy | Paul Weel Racing | Holden Commodore (VZ) | 2:07.8530 | +0.8766 | Top 10 |
| 6 | 1 | (Australia) Russell Ingall | Stone Brothers Racing | Ford Falcon (BA) | 2:07.8768 | +0.9004 | Top 10 |
| 7 | 888 | (Australia) Craig Lowndes | Triple Eight Race Engineering | Ford Falcon (BA) | 2:07.8939 | +0.9175 | Top 10 |
| 8 | 7 | (New Zealand) Steven Richards | Perkins Engineering | Holden Commodore (VZ) | 2:07.9130 | +0.9366 | Top 10 |
| 9 | 34 | (Australia) Dean Canto | Garry Rogers Motorsport | Holden Commodore (VZ) | 2:07.9895 | +1.0131 | Top 10 |
| 10 | 17 | (Australia) Steven Johnson | Dick Johnson Racing | Ford Falcon (BA) | 2:08.1109 | +1.1345 | Top 10 |
| 11 | 4 | (Australia) James Courtney | Stone Brothers Racing | Ford Falcon (BA) | 2:08.3054 | +1.3290 | 11 |
| 12 | 22 | (New Zealand) Jim Richards | Holden Racing Team | Holden Commodore (VZ) | 2:08.4501 | +1.4737 | 12 |
| 13 | 18 | (Australia) Alex Davison | Dick Johnson Racing | Ford Falcon (BA) | 2:08.5662 | +1.5898 | 13 |
| 14 | 5 | (Australia) David Brabham | Ford Performance Racing | Ford Falcon (BA) | 2:08.7346 | +1.7582 | 14 |
| 15 | 67 | (Australia) Paul Morris | Paul Morris Motorsport | Holden Commodore (VZ) | 2:08.7617 | +1.7853 | 15 |
| 16 | 33 | (Australia) Greg Ritter | Garry Rogers Motorsport | Holden Commodore (VZ) | 2:08.7723 | +1.7959 | 16 |
| 17 | 10 | (Australia) Jason Bargwanna | WPS Racing | Ford Falcon (BA) | 2:08.8672 | +1.8908 | 17 |
| 18 | 14 | (Australia) John Bowe | Brad Jones Racing | Ford Falcon (BA) | 2:09.0520 | +2.0756 | 18 |
| 19 | 55 | (Australia) Steve Owen | Rod Nash Racing | Holden Commodore (VZ) | 2:09.1141 | +2.1377 | 19 |
| 20 | 88 | (Denmark) Allan Simonsen | Triple Eight Race Engineering | Ford Falcon (BA) | 2:09.4248 | +2.4484 | 20 |
| 21 | 25 | (Australia) Warren Luff | Britek Motorsport | Ford Falcon (BA) | 2:09.5219 | +2.5455 | 21 |
| 22 | 8 | (Brazil) Max Wilson | WPS Racing | Ford Falcon (BA) | 2:09.7001 | +2.7237 | 22 |
| 23 | 021 | (New Zealand) Paul Radisich | Team Kiwi Racing | Holden Commodore (VZ) | 2:09.7200 | +2.7436 | 23 |
| 24 | 23 | (Australia) Owen Kelly | Tasman Motorsport | Holden Commodore (VZ) | 2:09.8579 | +2.8815 | 24 |
| 25 | 12 | (Australia) Dale Brede | Brad Jones Racing | Ford Falcon (BA) | 2:09.9120 | +2.9356 | 25 |
| 26 | 16 | (Australia) Tony D'Alberto | HSV Dealer Team | Holden Commodore (VZ) | 2:09.9785 | +3.0021 | 26 |
| 27 | 11 | (Australia) Shane Price | Perkins Engineering | Holden Commodore (VZ) | 2:10.0334 | +3.0570 | 27 |
| 28 | 20 | (Australia) Marcus Marshall | Paul Cruickshank Racing | Ford Falcon (BA) | 2:10.7325 | +3.7561 | 28 |
| 29 | 26 | (Australia) José Fernández | Britek Motorsport | Ford Falcon (BA) | 2:11.4185 | +4.4421 | 29 |
| DNQ | 50 | (Australia) Nathan Pretty | Paul Weel Racing | Holden Commodore (VZ) | | | 30 |
| DNQ | 39 | (Australia) Alan Gurr | Paul Morris Motorsport | Holden Commodore (VZ) | | | 31 |

=== Top ten shootout ===
| Pos | No | Team | Driver | Car | Time |
|---|---|---|---|---|---|
| Pole | 2 | Holden Racing Team | (Australia) Mark Skaife | Holden Commodore (VZ) | 2:07.4221 |
| 2 | 6 | Ford Performance Racing | (Australia) Jason Bright | Ford Falcon (BA) | 2:07.7292 |
| 3 | 15 | Toll HSV Dealer Team | (Australia) Rick Kelly | Holden VZ Commodore | 2:07.7919 |
| 4 | 3 | Tasman Motorsport | (New Zealand) Jason Richards | Holden VZ Commodore | 2:08.0657 |
| 5 | 7 | Jack Daniel's Racing | (New Zealand) Steven Richards | Holden VZ Commodore | 2:08.5399 |
| 6 | 888 | Team Betta Electrical | (Australia) Craig Lowndes | Ford BA Falcon | 2:08.5403 |
| 7 | 34 | Garry Rogers Motorsport | (Australia) Dean Canto | Holden VZ Commodore | 2:08.5841 |
| 8 | 51 | Supercheap Auto Racing | (New Zealand) Greg Murphy | Holden VZ Commodore | 2:08.6663 |
| 9 | 1 | Caltex Racing | (Australia) Russell Ingall | Ford BA Falcon | 2:09.0987 |
| 10 | 17 | Dick Johnson Racing | (Australia) Steven Johnson | Ford BA Falcon | 2:09.5437 |

=== Starting grid ===
The following table represents the final starting grid for the race on Sunday:

| Inside row | | | | | Outside row | | | | |
|---|---|---|---|---|---|---|---|---|---|
| 1 | (Australia) Mark Skaife (Australia) Garth Tander | 2 | | | 6 | (Australia) Jason Bright (Australia) Mark Winterbottom | | | 2 |
| 1 | Holden Racing Team (Holden Commodore (VZ)) | | | | Ford Performance Racing (Ford Falcon (BA)) | | | | 2 |
| 3 | | | (Australia) Rick Kelly (Australia) Todd Kelly | 15 | | | 3 | (New Zealand) Jason Richards (Australia) Andrew Jones | 4 |
| 3 | | | HSV Dealer Team (Holden Commodore (VZ)) | | | | Tasman Motorsport (Holden Commodore (VZ)) | | 4 |
| 5 | (New Zealand) Steven Richards (Australia) Paul Dumbrell | 7 | | | 888 | (Australia) Craig Lowndes (Australia) Jamie Whincup | | | 6 |
| 5 | Perkins Engineering (Holden Commodore (VZ)) | | | | Triple Eight Race Engineering (Ford Falcon (BA)) | | | | 6 |
| 7 | | | (Australia) Dean Canto (Australia) Lee Holdsworth | 34 | | | 51 | (New Zealand) Greg Murphy (Australia) Cameron McConville | 8 |
| 7 | | | Garry Rogers Motorsport (Holden Commodore (VZ)) | | | | Paul Weel Racing (Holden Commodore (VZ)) | | 8 |
| 9 | (Australia) Russell Ingall (Australia) Luke Youlden | 1 | | | 17 | (Australia) Steven Johnson (Australia) Will Davison | | | 10 |
| 9 | Stone Brothers Racing (Ford Falcon (BA)) | | | | Dick Johnson Racing (Ford Falcon (BA)) | | | | 10 |
| 11 | | | (Australia) James Courtney (Australia) Glenn Seton | 4 | | | 22 | (New Zealand) Jim Richards (Australia) Ryan Briscoe | 12 |
| 11 | | | Stone Brothers Racing (Ford Falcon (BA)) | | | | Holden Racing Team (Holden Commodore (VZ)) | | 12 |
| 13 | (Australia) Alex Davison (Australia) Grant Denyer | 18 | | | 5 | (Australia) David Brabham (New Zealand) Matthew Halliday | | | 14 |
| 13 | Dick Johnson Racing (Ford Falcon (BA)) | | | | Ford Performance Racing (Ford Falcon (BA)) | | | | 14 |
| 15 | | | (Australia) Paul Morris (Australia) Steve Ellery | 67 | | | 33 | (Australia) Greg Ritter (Australia) Cameron McLean | 16 |
| 15 | | | Paul Morris Motorsport (Holden Commodore (VZ)) | | | | Garry Rogers Motorsport (Holden Commodore (VZ)) | | 16 |
| 17 | (Australia) Jason Bargwanna (New Zealand) Craig Baird | 10 | | | 14 | (Australia) John Bowe (Australia) Brad Jones | | | 18 |
| 17 | WPS Racing (Ford Falcon (BA)) | | | | Brad Jones Racing (Ford Falcon (BA)) | | | | 18 |
| 19 | | | (Australia) Steve Owen (Australia) Tony Longhurst | 55 | | | 88 | (United Kingdom) Richard Lyons (Denmark) Allan Simonsen | 20 |
| 19 | | | Rod Nash Racing (Holden Commodore (VZ)) | | | | Triple Eight Race Engineering (Ford Falcon (BA)) | | 20 |
| 21 | (Australia) Warren Luff (Australia) Adam Macrow | 25 | | | 8 | (Brazil) Max Wilson (Australia) David Besnard | | | 22 |
| 21 | Britek Motorsport (Ford Falcon (BA)) | | | | WPS Racing (Ford Falcon (BA)) | | | | 22 |
| 23 | | | (New Zealand) Paul Radisich (New Zealand) Fabian Coulthard | 021 | | | 23 | (Australia) Owen Kelly (Australia) Mark Noske | 24 |
| 23 | | | Team Kiwi Racing (Holden Commodore (VZ)) | | | | Tasman Motorsport (Holden Commodore (VZ)) | | 24 |
| 25 | (Australia) Dale Brede (Australia) Michael Caruso | 12 | | | 16 | (Australia) Anthony Tratt (Australia) Tony D'Alberto | | | 26 |
| 25 | Brad Jones Racing (Ford Falcon (BA)) | | | | HSV Dealer Team (Holden Commodore (VZ)) | | | | 26 |
| 27 | | | (Australia) Jack Perkins (Australia) Shane Price | 11 | | | 20 | (Australia) Marcus Marshall (Australia) Jonathon Webb | 28 |
| 27 | | | Perkins Engineering (Holden Commodore (VZ)) | | | | Paul Cruickshank Racing (Ford Falcon (BA)) | | 28 |
| 29 | (Australia) José Fernández (Australia) Tony Ricciardello | 26 | | | 50 | (Australia) Paul Weel (Australia) Nathan Pretty | | | 30 |
| 29 | Britek Motorsport (Ford Falcon (BA)) | | | | Paul Weel Racing (Holden Commodore (VZ)) | | | | 30 |
| 31 | | | (Australia) Alan Gurr (New Zealand) Kayne Scott | 39 | | | | | |
| 31 | | | Paul Morris Motorsport (Holden Commodore (VZ)) | | | | | | |

== Race results ==
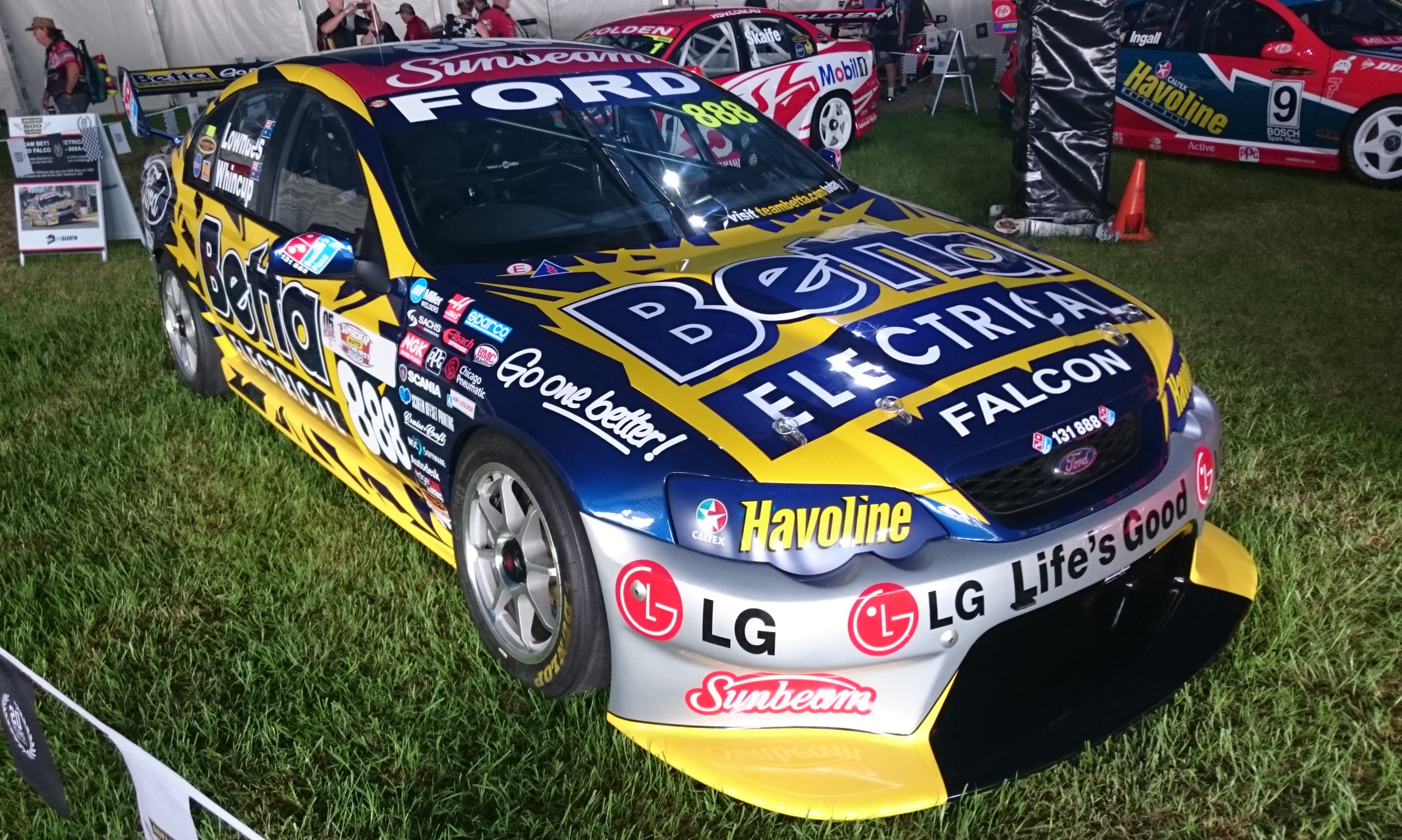
The Ford Falcon BA with which Craig Lowndes and Jamie Whincup won the race. The car is pictured in 2018.

| Pos | No | Team | Drivers | Car | Laps | Time/Retired | Grid | Points |
|---|---|---|---|---|---|---|---|---|
| 1 | 888 | Triple Eight Race Engineering | (Australia) Craig Lowndes (Australia) Jamie Whincup | Ford Falcon (BA) | 161 | 6:59:53.5852 | 6 | 320 |
| 2 | 15 | HSV Dealer Team | (Australia) Rick Kelly (Australia) Todd Kelly | Holden Commodore (VZ) | 161 | +0.5868 | 3 | 310 |
| 3 | 4 | Stone Brothers Racing | (Australia) James Courtney (Australia) Glenn Seton | Ford Falcon (BA) | 161 | +9.5404 | 11 | 300 |
| 4 | 1 | Stone Brothers Racing | (Australia) Russell Ingall (Australia) Luke Youlden | Ford Falcon (BA) | 161 | +9.5460 | 9 | 290 |
| 5 | 7 | Perkins Engineering | (New Zealand) Steven Richards (Australia) Paul Dumbrell | Holden Commodore (VZ) | 161 | +10.7907 | 5 | 280 |
| 6 | 67 | Paul Morris Motorsport | (Australia) Paul Morris (Australia) Steve Ellery | Holden Commodore (VZ) | 161 | +14.3898 | 15 | 270 |
| 7 | 55 | Rod Nash Racing | (Australia) Steve Owen (Australia) Tony Longhurst | Holden Commodore (VZ) | 161 | +17.7381 | 19 | 260 |
| 8 | 50 | Paul Weel Racing | (Australia) Nathan Pretty (Australia) Paul Weel | Holden Commodore (VZ) | 161 | +19.5688 | 30 | 250 |
| 9 | 18 | Dick Johnson Racing | (Australia) Alex Davison (Australia) Grant Denyer | Ford Falcon (BA) | 161 | +20.0446 | 13 | 240 |
| 10 | 10 | WPS Racing | (Australia) Jason Bargwanna (New Zealand) Craig Baird | Ford Falcon (BA) | 161 | +22.4515 | 17 | 230 |
| 11 | 14 | Brad Jones Racing | (Australia) John Bowe (Australia) Brad Jones | Ford Falcon (BA) | 161 | +24.8674 | 18 | 220 |
| 12 | 88 | Triple Eight Race Engineering | (United Kingdom) Richard Lyons (Denmark) Allan Simonsen | Ford Falcon (BA) | 161 | +29.9987 | 20 | 210 |
| 13 | 33 | Garry Rogers Motorsport | (Australia) Greg Ritter (Australia) Cameron McLean | Holden Commodore (VZ) | 160 | +1 lap | 16 | 200 |
| 14 | 8 | WPS Racing | (Brazil) Max Wilson (Australia) David Besnard | Ford Falcon (BA) | 160 | +1 lap | 22 | 190 |
| 15 | 23 | Tasman Motorsport | (Australia) Owen Kelly (Australia) Mark Noske | Holden Commodore (VZ) | 159 | +2 laps | 24 | 180 |
| 16 | 26 | Britek Motorsport | (Australia) José Fernández (Australia) Tony Ricciardello | Ford Falcon (BA) | 159 | +2 laps | 29 | 170 |
| 17 | 34 | Garry Rogers Motorsport | (Australia) Dean Canto (Australia) Lee Holdsworth | Holden Commodore (VZ) | 129 | +32 laps | 7 | 160 |
| DNF | 3 | Tasman Motorsport | (New Zealand) Jason Richards (Australia) Andrew Jones | Holden Commodore (VZ) | 151 | Crash | 4 | |
| DNF | 51 | Paul Weel Racing | (New Zealand) Greg Murphy (Australia) Cameron McConville | Holden Commodore (VZ) | 104 | Crash | 8 | |
| DNF | 25 | Britek Motorsport | (Australia) Warren Luff (Australia) Adam Macrow | Ford Falcon (BA) | 102 | Crash damage | 21 | |
| DNF | 16 | HSV Dealer Team | (Australia) Anthony Tratt (Australia) Tony D'Alberto | Holden Commodore (VZ) | 93 | Crash | 26 | |
| DNF | 20 | Paul Cruickshank Racing | (Australia) Marcus Marshall (Australia) Jonathon Webb | Ford Falcon (BA) | 90 | Crash | 28 | |
| DNF | 021 | Team Kiwi Racing | (New Zealand) Paul Radisich (New Zealand) Fabian Coulthard | Holden Commodore (VZ) | 71 | Crash | 23 | |
| DNF | 12 | Brad Jones Racing | (Australia) Dale Brede (Australia) Michael Caruso (New Zealand) Mark Porter* | Ford Falcon (BA) | 59 | Crash | 25 | |
| DNF | 5 | Ford Performance Racing | (Australia) David Brabham (New Zealand) Matt Halliday | Ford Falcon (BA) | 56 | Crash | 14 | |
| DNF | 6 | Ford Performance Racing | (Australia) Jason Bright (Australia) Mark Winterbottom | Ford Falcon (BA) | 28 | Engine | 2 | |
| DNF | 17 | Dick Johnson Racing | (Australia) Steven Johnson (Australia) Will Davison | Ford Falcon (BA) | 27 | Crash | 10 | |
| DNF | 22 | Holden Racing Team | (New Zealand) Jim Richards (Australia) Ryan Briscoe | Holden Commodore (VZ) | 24 | Crash damage | 12 | |
| DNF | 39 | Paul Morris Motorsport | (Australia) Alan Gurr (New Zealand) Kayne Scott | Holden Commodore (VZ) | 24 | Overheating | 31 | |
| DNF | 11 | Perkins Engineering | (Australia) Jack Perkins (Australia) Shane Price | Holden Commodore (VZ) | 1 | Crash damage | 27 | |
| DNF | 2 | Holden Racing Team | (Australia) Mark Skaife (Australia) Garth Tander | Holden Commodore (VZ) | 0 | Crash | 1 | |

*Mark Porter practiced in the #12 Falcon, but was injured in a serious crash in a support race on the Friday before the race. Michael Caruso was drafted into the team so the car could race. Porter would die on the Sunday afternoon from the injuries in the crash.

== Broadcast ==
Network 10 broadcast the race for the tenth consecutive year, dating back to the 1997 5.0L race.

Network 10
Host: Bill Woods
Booth: Neil Crompton, Leigh Diffey
Pit-lane: Daryl Beattie, Mark Howard, Greg Rust

== Statistics ==
- Provisional Pole Position - #2 Mark Skaife - 2:06.9764
- Pole Position - #2 Mark Skaife - 2:07.4221
- Fastest Lap - #888 Craig Lowndes - 2:08.6571 (new lap record)
- Average Speed - 143 km/h
