= Adam Macrow =

Australian racing driver

- Nationality: (Australia) Australian
- Born: 23 November 1978 (age 47) Melbourne
- Relatives: Peter Macrow (father); Tim Macrow (brother)

V8 Supercar
- Years active: 1996–09
- Teams: John Faulkner Racing; Perkins Motorsport; Ford Performance Racing; Triple Eight Race Engineering; Britek Motorsport Howard Racing
- Starts: 20
- Best finish: 36th in 2008

Previous series
- 1996 1997-2003 1999 2005-06: Victorian Formula Ford; Australian Formula Ford; Australian Drivers' Champ. Development V8 Supercars

Championship titles
- 1998 2006: Australian Formula Ford; Fujitsu V8 Supercars Series

Adam Macrow (born 23 November 1978, in Victoria) is a professional race car driver.

In 1985, Macrow started his motorsports career in karting. Over his time spent in karts, he won two national titles and ten Victorian titles. In 1995, he moved out of karts into Formula Vee, which was followed in 1996 by a move into Formula Ford. He won the National Championship in 1998. Macrow's Formula Ford title was the first title for the Australian manufacturer of Spectrum Cars, which have since run drivers such as Mark Winterbottom and John Martin.

In 1999, Macrow raced in Formula Holden, achieving a fourth-place finish in the series. In the same year, he started his career in V8 Supercars with Longhurst Racing, driving with Tony Longhurst in the Queensland 500 and Bathurst 1000. While this was a prize for winning the Australian Formula Ford Championship, it did not turn out well, with the pair retiring from both races.

In the following years, Macrow continued in his role as a co-driver for various teams. The highlight of his career came in 2005, achieving a fifth place at the Sandown 500 and a third place at the Bathurst 1000 for Triple Eight Race Engineering. In 2006, he continued this success, winning the Fujitsu V8 Supercars Series in his first season in the competition, and winning eight out of the 18 races in the process. He stepped into the Team Kiwi Racing Falcon in 2007, after Paul Radisich was still recovering from an accident at Bathurst in 2006. For the Bathurst 1000 and Sandown 500 he raced the Ford Falcon BF of Britek Motorsport for the second year driving with Jason Bright.

Macrow's younger brother Tim, who also races, won the 2007 Australian Drivers' Championship.

Macrow works as a driver coach for Borland Racing Developments and owns AMR Kartsport, which specialises in engine, chassis and driver development.

== Racing record ==
=== Karting career summary ===
Season	Series	Position
1989	J.C. Maddox Karting Trophy	**1st**
1992	Australian Karting Championship - Junior National Light	**1st**
1995	Australian Karting Championship - Junior International	**1st**

=== Racing career summary ===
Season	Series	Position	Car	Team
1996	Victorian Formula Ford Championship	4th	Spectrum - Ford	Stockman Auto Racing
1997	Australian Formula Ford Championship	8th	Spectrum 06 Ford	Team Arrow
1998	Australian Formula Ford Championship	**1st**	Spectrum 06 Ford	Team Arrow
1999	Australian Drivers' Championship	4th	Reynard 95D Holden	Stockman Auto Racing
2000	Shell Championship Series	49th	Holden Commodore VT	John Faulkner Racing
2001	Shell Championship Series	63rd	Holden Commodore VX	Perkins Engineering
2003	V8 Supercar Championship Series	53rd	Ford Falcon BA	Ford Performance Racing
2003	Australian Formula Ford Championship	11th	Spectrum 06 Ford	Just Cars Magazine
2004	V8 Supercar Championship Series	63rd	Ford Falcon BA	Ford Performance Racing
2005	HPDC V8Supercar Series	4th	Ford Falcon BA	Howard Racing
2005	V8 Supercar Championship Series	39th	Ford Falcon BA	Triple Eight Race Engineering
2006	Fujitsu V8Supercar Series	**1st**	Ford Falcon BA	Howard Racing
2006	V8 Supercar Championship Series	60th	Ford Falcon BA	Britek Motorsport
2008	V8 Supercar Championship Series	36th	Ford BF Falcon	Britek Motorsport

=== Complete V8 Supercars results ===
(Races in bold indicate pole position) (Races in italics indicate fastest lap)

Supercars results
Year	Team	Car	1	2	3	4	5	6	7	8	9	10	11	12	13	14	15	16	17	18	19	20	21	22	23	24	25	26	27	28	29	30	31	32	33	34	35	36	37	Position	Points
1999	Longhurst Racing	Ford Falcon (AU)	EAS; R1	EAS; R2	EAS; R3	ADE; R4	BAR; R5	BAR; R6	BAR; R7	PHI; R8	PHI; R9	PHI; R10	HID; R11	HID; R12	HID; R13	SAN; R14	SAN; R15	SAN; R16	QLD; R17	QLD; R18	QLD; R19	CAL; R20	CAL; R21	CAL; R22	SYM; R23	SYM; R24	SYM; R25	WIN; R26	WIN; R27	WIN; R28	ORA; R29	ORA; R30	ORA; R31	QLD; R32; Ret	BAT; R33; Ret					N/A	0
2000	John Faulkner Racing	Holden Commodore (VT)	PHI; R1	PHI; R2	BAR; R3	BAR; R4	BAR; R5	ADE; R6	ADE; R7	EAS; R8	EAS; R9	EAS; R10	HID; R11	HID; R12	HID; R13	CAN; R14	CAN; R15	CAN; R16	QLD; R17	QLD; R18	QLD; R19	WIN; R20	WIN; R21	WIN; R22	ORA; R23	ORA; R24	ORA; R25	CAL; R26	CAL; R27	CAL; R28	QLD; R29; 12	SAN; R30	SAN; R31	SAN; R32	BAT; R33; Ret					49th	64
2001	Perkins Engineering	Holden Commodore (VX)	PHI; R1	PHI; R2	ADE; R3	ADE; R4	EAS; R5	EAS; R6	HDV; R7	HDV; R8	HDV; R9	CAN; R10	CAN; R11	CAN; R12	BAR; R13	BAR; R14	BAR; R15	CAL; R16	CAL; R17	CAL; R18	ORA; R19	ORA; R20	QLD; R21; Ret	WIN; R22	WIN; R23	BAT; R24; Ret	PUK; R25	PUK; R26	PUK; R27	SAN; R28	SAN; R29	SAN; R30								63rd	160
2003	Ford Performance Racing	Ford Falcon (BA)	ADE; R1	ADE; R1	PHI; R3	EAS; R4	WIN; R5	BAR; R6	BAR; R7	BAR; R8	HDV; R9	HDV; R10	HDV; R11	QLD; R12	ORA; R13	SAN; R14; 17	BAT; R15; Ret	SUR; R16	SUR; R17	PUK; R18	PUK; R19	PUK; R20	EAS; R21	EAS; R22																53rd	128
2004	Ford Performance Racing	Ford Falcon (BA)	ADE; R1	ADE; R2	EAS; R3	PUK; R4	PUK; R5	PUK; R6	HDV; R7	HDV; R8	HDV; R9	BAR; R10	BAR; R11	BAR; R12	QLD; R13	WIN; R14	ORA; R15	ORA; R16	SAN; R17; 19	BAT; R18; Ret	SUR; R19	SUR; R20	SYM; R21	SYM; R22	SYM; R23	EAS; R24	EAS; R25	EAS; R26												63rd	120
2005	Triple Eight Race Engineering	Ford Falcon (BA)	ADE; R1	ADE; R2	PUK; R3	PUK; R4	PUK; R5	BAR; R6	BAR; R7	BAR; R8	EAS; R9	EAS; R10	SHA; R11	SHA; R12	SHA; R13	HDV; R14	HDV; R15	HDV; R16	QLD; R17	ORA; R18	ORA; R19	SAN; R20; 5	BAT; R21; 3	SUR; R22	SUR; R23	SUR; R24	SYM; R25	SYM; R26	SYM; R27	PHI; R28	PHI; R29	PHI; R30								39th	184
2006	Britek Motorsport	Ford Falcon (BA)	ADE; R1	ADE; R2	PUK; R3	PUK; R4	PUK; R5	BAR; R6	BAR; R7	BAR; R8	WIN; R9	WIN; R10	WIN; R11	HDV; R12	HDV; R13	HDV; R14	QLD; R15	QLD; R16	QLD; R17	ORA; R18	ORA; R19	ORA; R20	SAN; R21; 23	BAT; R22; Ret	SUR; R23	SUR; R24	SUR; R25	SYM; R26	SYM; R27	SYM; R28	BHR; R29	BHR; R30	BHR; R31	PHI; R32	PHI; R33	PHI; R34				60th	100
2007	Team Kiwi Racing	Ford Falcon (BF)	ADE; R1; 18	ADE; R2; 16	BAR; R3	BAR; R4	BAR; R5	PUK; R6	PUK; R7	PUK; R8	WIN; R9	WIN; R10	WIN; R11	EAS; R12	EAS; R13	EAS; R14	HDV; R15	HDV; R16	HDV; R17	QLD; R18	QLD; R19	QLD; R20	ORA; R21	ORA; R22	ORA; R23															35th	33
2007	Britek Motorsport	Ford Falcon (BF)																								SAN; R24; Ret	BAT; R25; Ret	SUR; R26	SUR; R27	SUR; R28	BHR; R29	BHR; R30	BHR; R31	SYM; R32	SYM; R33	SYM; R34	PHI; R35	PHI; R36	PHI; R37	35th	33
2008	Britek Motorsport	Ford Falcon (BF)	ADE; R1	ADE; R2	EAS; R3	EAS; R4	EAS; R5	HAM; R6	HAM; R7	HAM; R8	BAR; R9	BAR; R10	BAR; R11	SAN; R12	SAN; R13	SAN; R14	HDV; R15	HDV; R16	HDV; R17	QLD; R18	QLD; R19	QLD; R20	WIN; R21	WIN; R22	WIN; R23	PHI; R24; 11	BAT; R25; 9	SUR; R26	SUR; R27	SUR; R28	BHR; R29	BHR; R30	BHR; R31	SYM; R32	SYM; R33	SYM; R34	ORA; R35	ORA; R36	ORA; R37	36th	320

=== Complete Bathurst 1000 results ===
Year	No.	Class	Team	Car	Co-driver	Position	Laps
1998	33	3E	Burwood Motorsport	Honda Civic	(Australia) Allan Letcher (Australia) Cameron Edwards	DNF	34
1998	9	OC	Longhurst Racing	Ford EL Falcon	(Australia) Alan Jones	DNF	58
1999	25		Longhurst Racing	Ford AU Falcon	(Australia) Tony Longhurst	DNF	150
2000	46		John Faulkner Racing	Holden VT Commodore	(New Zealand) John Faulkner	DNF	154
2001	8		Perkins Engineering	Holden VX Commodore	(Australia) Luke Youlden	DNF	85
2003	5		Ford Performance Racing	Ford BA Falcon	(Australia) Darren Hossack	DNF	63
2004	5		Ford Performance Racing	Ford BA Falcon	(Switzerland) Alain Menu	DNF	43
2005	88		Triple Eight Race Engineering	Ford BA Falcon	(Australia) Steven Ellery	**3rd**	161
2006	25		Britek Motorsport	Ford BA Falcon	(Australia) Warren Luff	DNF	102
2007	25		Britek Motorsport	Ford BF Falcon	(Australia) Jason Bright	DNF	149
2008	25		Britek Motorsport	Ford BF Falcon	(Australia) Jason Bright	9th	161

Sporting positions
Preceded by Dean Canto	Winner of the Fujitsu V8 Supercars Series; 2006	Succeeded by Tony D'Alberto
