= Team Kiwi Racing =

V8 Supercar racing team

- Team Principal: David John
- Debut: 2000
- Final Season: 2008
- Round wins: 0
- Pole positions: 1
- 2008 position: 17th (742 pts)

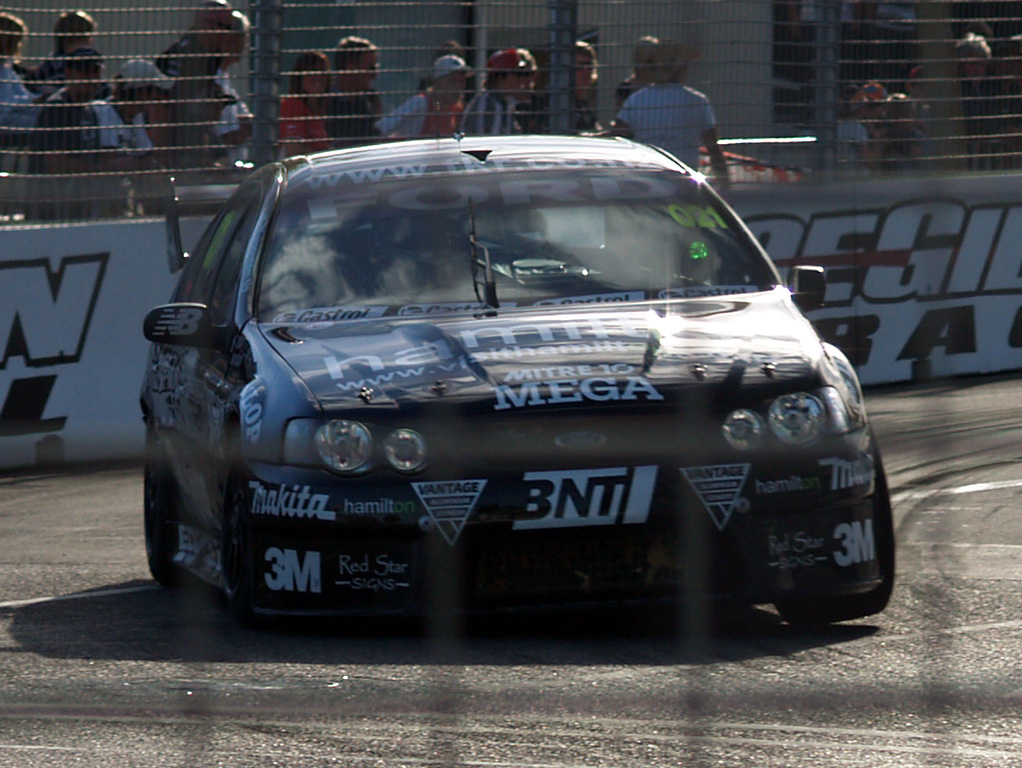
Kayne Scott at the 2008 Hamilton 400.

Team Kiwi Racing is a multi-championship winning racing team that is based in New Zealand and has competed in the Australian V8 Supercar series, the Australian Carrera Cup Series, The New Zealand 2.0ltr Touring Car Championship, The NZV8 Championship and BMW Championship Series, BMW e46 Spec Championship, BMW Mini Challenge Championship, Australia V8 Supercar Development Series, Porsche Rennsport Australia and the LK500 Endurance series in New Zealand. The Kiwi team supports a number of up and coming young Kiwi drivers from grass root level motorsport through local domestic and international competition.

== History ==
Team Kiwi Racing is a New Zealand-based motorsport team that debuted in 1999, and has found success on both the domestic New Zealand and International Motorsport stages. Debuting in 1999 with a two car team in the New Zealand 2.0L Touring Car championship, Team Kiwi Racing built two P11 Nissan Primera's to compete against the BMW Factory backed team that had dominated the New Zealand 2.0L Touring Car Championship for many years. TKR Owner David John provided the two TKR seats in the teams Nissan Primera's to Jason Richards and Angus Fogg with both driver also being employed by TKR as full-time staff. Richards helped with the promotions and marketing while Fogg was in charge of the workshop and the build of the team's Nissan Primera race cars. Team Kiwi Racing announced their arrival in style on debut in the New Zealand 2.0L Touring Car Championship with the TKR Nissan Primera's taking home first position (Jason Richards) and second position (Angus Fogg) in the championship ending the dominance of the factory BMW team. Team Kiwi Racing went on to achieve back to back championship titles in 2000 and 2001 with Jason Richards winning the 2.0L Touring Car Championship two years in a row for TKR with Angus Fogg securing second in 200 and third in 2001.

In 2000 Team Kiwi Racing owner David John honored his commitment to Jason Richards and Angus Fogg and made the significant step from domestic to international competition. Debuting at Bathurst in November 2000 as the first ever New Zealand based V8 Supercar team to compete in the Australian V8 Supercar Championship, the teams All Black Supercar numbered #777 finished 16th at Bathurst out of 50 plus starters and on a track that neither TKR driver had raced on before or even raced a Supercar prior to this debut race. TKR used Holden vehicles as their choice of race cars until the end of the 2006 season. TKR did run a two car team at the Adelaide round and the event at Pukekohe in the 2001 V8 Supercar Championship for lead driver Jason Richards and for fellow Kiwi Angus Fogg, before deciding to focus on a single car team moving forward for Jason Richards midway through 2001.

TKR competed in the Australian V8 Supercar Championship as a privateer team that did not enjoy the benefits of factory support. TKR achieved their first podium finishes at the Canberra street race, their first Pole Position at the 2004 Winton round in very trying conditions then achieved a podium place for the round in the 2005 Shanghai round, finishing third for the round. TKR finished 6th in Perth after leading the entire race from start to within 100m of the finish line where Radisich was spun around coming onto the front straight while leading. A top 8 position finish at Bathurst, 3rd in race 2 in Canberra and a number of other top ten results and not worthy achievements in the Supercars Championship.

During the 2006 Bathurst 1000 endurance race at Mount Panorama, driver Paul Radisich crashed at around 200 km/h head on into a tyre barrier, flipping the car on the roof. The roof had to be cut off to get Radisich out and he was taken to hospital where he was in a serious but stable condition. The car was so badly damaged that the team was unable to race at the following Indy 300 round on the Gold Coast. To honor the teams Supercar franchise agreement the team leased a chassis from Paul Morris Motorsport to replace the damaged car for the remainder of the season, with former driver Craig Baird and young NZ driver Chris Pither driving the car at the Tasmania & Bahrain rounds respectively. The car was then driven by Fujitsu V8 driver Tony Evangelou for the final round at Phillip Island.

For the 2007 season, TKR, Ford Performance Racing and Prodrive Australia entered discussions that would see TKR buy an FPR Falcon with technical support from FPR. Despite many thinking this was a factory backed deal with support from Ford NZ and Ford Australia, this was not the case. TKR was grouped with FPR due to their technical partnership, reducing TKR's available test days. Radisich was retained as the lead driver, although he missed the season opening Clipsal 500 as his recovery from the Bathurst accident continued. In May 2007 a dispute between Radisich, TKR and FPR broke out. Radisich accused TKR of breaching its contract with FPR and went out to the media with a statement saying in some way TKR had breached their contact with Radisich, despite Radisich being contracted to TKR not FPR in any manner, way, shape or form and even before TKR and FPR had officially parted ways or TKR announcing what plans TKR had in pace post FPR.

TKR sold the ex FPR car back to FPR and contrary to what was said in the press FPR was not left out of pocket one cent. Needless to say TKR and Radisich parted company seeing Radisich out of a drive.

After missing Eastern Creek, Hidden Valley Raceway and Queensland Raceway allowing time for the preparation of a new car and engines to be completed it was announced that TKR had struck a deal with fellow Ford team Stone Brothers Racing. New Zealand Rookie Shane van Gisbergen was announced as the TKR driver to replace Radisich.

Looking to continue with the opportunities that Team Kiwi Racing was established to provide Kiwi drivers and helping them with financial support and guidance to be able to establish themselves in the Australian V8 Supercar Championship, it was announced that in 2008 Kayne Scott would drive for TKR. Scott drove eight rounds and the team rotated the car through a number of drivers such as Chris Pither, Steve Owen, Daniel Gaunt and for special promotional purposes to provide V8 Supercars additional media exposure throughout the UAE, Team Kiwi Racing provided Bahrain domestic series driver Fahad Al Musalam with the opportunity to drive the TKR V8 Supercar at the Bahrain round of the V8 Supercar Championship.

With the team struggling to get on-top of the ex888 Ford Falcon throughout the 2008 season, TKR decided that after a discussion with Paul Morris it would be better for TKR to go back to what they knew, having already purchased two PMM built V8 Supercar previously.

In 2009 to help reset TKR's foundations after a second big and costly Bathurst accident in as many years, TKR decided to provided the drive to former Carrera Cup racer Dean Fiore who was in a position to bring some sponsors to the team and could help TKR get back on track without TKR having to fund all of the seasons running and crash damage budgets as they had done for all TKR drivers over the previous years.

In 2009 around the time of the global melt down the ANZ bank in New Zealand called in a bank overdraft facility that the ANZ bank had loaned the Team Kiwi Racing business of which David John had personally guaranteed. As Mr John had signed as a guarantor for a $300,000 overdraft facility for Team Kiwi Racing to get the team back on track with new cars engines etc. after the 2006 Radisich crash and again after the 2007 Pither Bathurst crash the ANZ bank went after John to make the repayment rather than Team Kiwi Racing who the loan and asset security of the loan was with.

Despite Mr John explaining to ANZ bank that Team Kiwi Racing had ample assets to cover the loan (which the bank knew as they had a security over such team assets) and that the race season had started and therefore he need the bank to work with him and wait till years end (7 months), to ensure the team honored all of their obligations under their Supercar franchise agreement and made it possible to cash up the $350,000 worth of Official Team Merchandise that Team Kiwi Racing had on hand or sell off assets in a timely manner to repay the loan at years end so the team could continue in the Supercar Championship, the ANZ bank refused to wait and proceed with bankruptcy proceedings against Mr John personally not Team Kiwi Racing who the loan was provided to. Ironically the ANZ's actions proceed with bankruptcy proceedings against Mr John personally were quickly annulled with-in weeks of the banks actions. It is prudent to note that an annulment is something that only happens when it is clear there are more assets than debits and a business or in this case Mr John was actually able to cover such a loan repayment given the time to do so, which ANZ did not allow in this case. In fact not one person was left out of pocket contrary to some media stories, or an annulment would not have been provided.

While John was focused on a way forward with Team Kiwi Racing in the Supercars Championship and having kept V8 Supercars up dated on all of the above, John was blindsided by V8 Supercars when they moved to seize TKR's Racing Entitlement Contract after the Hamilton round of the Championship in order that it would be sold. Interesting the TKR franchise was sold by V8 Supercars to the very same driver that Mr John had already contracted as the TKR driver for the 2009 season being Dean Fiore and the same family Mr John had been in discussions with himself as a last resort and before V8 Supercars stepped in. The Fiore family used the franchise to start Triple F Racing .

Despite the disappointment after so much hard work to provided the opportunities that TKR had over their time in the Supercars Championship Team Kiwi Racing has continued to focus on the support and development of young up and coming Kiwi drivers. In 2009 Team Kiwi Racing (TKR) secured 2 x BMW Minis to run in the New Zealand BMW Mini Challenge Championship for Matt Hamilton and Ryan Bailey. Both TKR BMW mini's dominated the BMW Mini Challenge Championship with Matthew Hamilton taking out first position and Ryan Bailey taking out second position for a TKR one two in the Championship.

As a reward Team Kiwi Racing ran Hamilton in the 2010 Fujitsu V8 Supercar Series in Australia, but only for the first three rounds.

After their success in the 2009/10 Championship, TKR purchased a third BMW Mini Challenge racecar for the 2010/11 Championship season. That season saw Ben Dallas, Matthew Gibson and Craig Innes selected to drive the TKR car. The TKR team ultimately won back to back Championship titles, and TKR also claimed second and third position for a clean sweep of the podium at the year's end. Ben Dallas finished in first, Craig Innes in second, and Matthew Gibson rounded out the podium in third.

For 2012 TKR provided Andre Heimgartner with a full season in the TKR Porsche Carrera Cup car in the Australian Porsche Carrera Cup Championship. TKR provided expert input to Heimgartner with driver advise from Porsche Carrera Cup legend Craig Baird and Porsche Technical Engineer Todd Bickerton who was contracted to TKR for the season.

Along with a number of solid results during his debut season Heimgartner was awarded Rookie of the year at the final round of the Australian Porsche Carrera Cup Championship held at the Gold Coast Indy 300 event. This saw Heimgartner provided with the opportunity to be fly over to Europe to test against other top rookies from around the world for one seat in the Porsche Super Cup Championship that is partly funded by Porsche Germany. Heimgartner missed out on the drive but again TKR had helped yet a young kiwi driver kick start his International motorsport career on the right foot.

During 2013 Team Kiwi Racing campaigned for a second season in the Australian Porsche Carrera Cup Championship. This time TKR Owner David John allocated the drive to Shae Davies and Adam Gowans. Both drivers were quick and achieved solid results for TKR in their respective categories highlighted by Team Kiwi Racing winning the Porsche Carrera Cup Rennsport meeting followed by three wins from three starts for TKR at Bathurst, Mount Panorama.

For 2014 Team Kiwi Racing purchased a NZV8 for Craig Baird to race. The season started well with Pole positions and race wins but a tough season eventuated with the older Holden engines being pushed to their limits and past them to keep up with the Ford falcon motorsport engines resulting in two engine failures that saw a tough season for TKR.

For the 2016 season Team Kiwi Racing dipped their toe in the water to experience the NZ V8SuperTourer Championship. Craig Baird again provided TKR with race wins at Pukekohe Raceway and Taupo International raceway before it was decided that the politics between NZV8 Touring cars and V8SuperTourers needed to be sorted before making further commitments to either championship going forward.

In 2017 Thomas Boniface, a 12-year-old BMW MINI Challenge Driver was the latest young Kiwi driver to be selected as part of the TKR Development Academy. Boniface is a 4 times national KartSport Champion and TKR had plans for him moving forward. Boniface finished a season high of 5th at the Taupo round out of 32 cars, winning two races.

In 2019 Team Kiwi Racing decided to enter the Bathurst 1000 as a Wildcard and purchased a Triple Eight built Holden ZB Commodore and lined up 2018 Porsche Carrera Cup Australia Champion Jaxon Evans and three-time Porsche Carrera Cup Asia Champion Chris van der Drift to drive the car. The team ended up scrapping there plans due to COVID and Dunlop unable to supply the additional quantity of tires the team required for the teams pre Bathurst test days and for the Bathurst race it-self.

Team Kiwi Racing will celebrate their 25th Anniversary in 2025 at Bathurst, Mount Panorama were the All Kiwi Team debuted in November 2000 as the first ever Kiwi team to compete in the Australian Supercar Championship.

Team Kiwi Racing support New Zealand drivers through the teams' TKR scholarship program.

== V8 Supercars drivers ==
- (New Zealand) Jason Richards
- (New Zealand) Angus Fogg
- (New Zealand) Simon Wills
- (New Zealand) Craig Baird
- (New Zealand) Mark Porter
- (New Zealand) Fabian Coulthard
- (New Zealand) Paul Radisich
- (New Zealand) Daniel Gaunt
- (Australia) Adam Macrow
- (Australia) Steve Owen
- (New Zealand) Shane van Gisbergen
- (New Zealand) John McIntyre
- (New Zealand) Kayne Scott
- (New Zealand) Chris Pither
- (Bahrain) Fahad Al Musalam
- (Australia) Dean Fiore

=== Complete Bathurst 1000 results ===
Year	No.	Car	Drivers	Position	Laps
2000	777	Holden Commodore VT	(New Zealand) Jason Richards (New Zealand) Angus Fogg	16th	157
2001	021	Holden Commodore VT	(New Zealand) Jason Richards (New Zealand) Angus Fogg	16th	157
2002	021	Holden Commodore VX	(New Zealand) Jason Richards (New Zealand) Simon Wills	11th	160
2003	021	Holden Commodore VX	(New Zealand) Craig Baird (New Zealand) Mark Porter	17th	149
2004	021	Holden Commodore VY	(New Zealand) Craig Baird (New Zealand) Mark Porter	DNF	129
2005	021	Holden Commodore VZ	(New Zealand) John Faulkner (Australia) Alan Gurr	10th	158
2006	021	Holden Commodore VZ	(New Zealand) Paul Radisich (New Zealand) Fabian Coulthard	DNF	71
2007	021	Ford Falcon BF	(New Zealand) Shane van Gisbergen (New Zealand) John McIntyre	DNF	148
2008	021	Ford Falcon BF	(New Zealand) Kayne Scott (New Zealand) Chris Pither	DNF	8
