= 2006 PlaceMakers V8 International =

2006 Supercar Championship event

(New Zealand) 2006 PlaceMakers V8 International
Event Information
- Round 2 of 13 in the 2006 V8 Supercar Championship Series
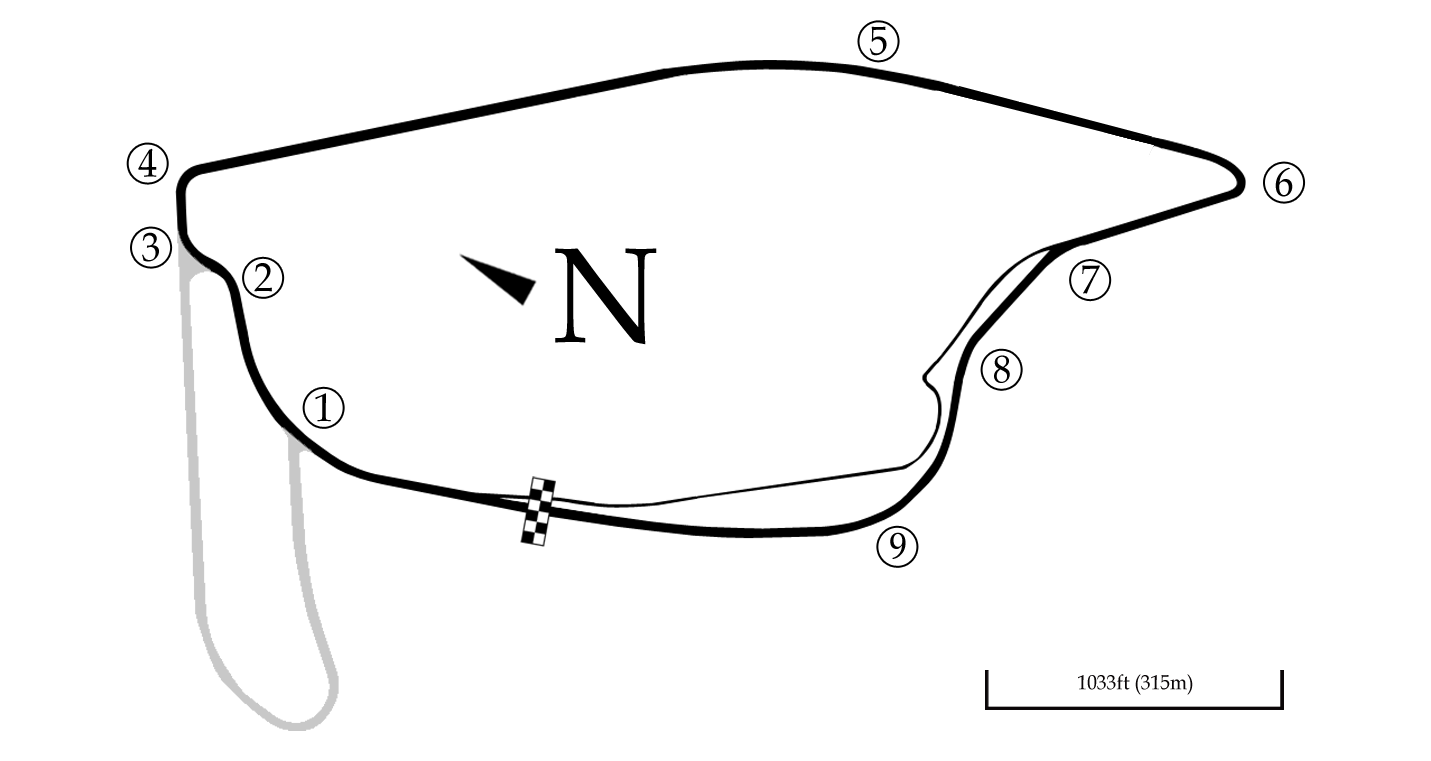
- Date: 21–23 April 2006
- Location: Pukekohe, New Zealand
- Venue: Pukekohe Park Raceway
- Weather: Friday: Sunny; Saturday: Sunny; Sunday: Overcast, light rain

Results
Race 1
Distance	36 laps	100 km
Pole position	Garth Tander; HSV Dealer Team	55.7253
Winner	Mark Skaife; Holden Racing Team	39:35.1429
Race 2
Distance	47 laps	132 km
Winner	Garth Tander; HSV Dealer Team	55:39.7648
Race 3
Distance	50 laps	140 km
Winner	Mark Skaife; Holden Racing Team	50:57.1288
Round Results
First	Mark Skaife; Holden Racing Team	312 pts
Second	Mark Winterbottom; Ford Performance Racing	296 pts
Third	Russell Ingall; Stone Brothers Racing	290 pts

The 2006 PlaceMakers V8 International was a motor race for V8 Supercars held on the weekend of 21–23 April 2006. The event was held at the Pukekohe Park Raceway in Pukekohe, New Zealand, and consisted of three races culminating in 400 kilometers. It was the second round of thirteen in the 2006 V8 Supercar Championship Series and the first of two international events on the calendar.

After a tough start to the season, Mark Skaife stayed largely dominant to take two race wins and the overall round win. Mark Winterbottom repaid Ford Performance Racing's faith in him by achieving his first podiums (race and round) by finishing second overall while Russell Ingall rounded out the overall podium. Local hero Greg Murphy endured a tough round. Already dissatisfied with his team's move to Perkins engines, the four-time winner of the event was taken out early in race one and struggled to move forward in both races.

This round also saw the return of the reverse-grid race. Although its return wasn't met with much enthusiasm and would not feature at any future Pukekohe events going forward.

== Background ==
After the bids of Auckland and Wellington to host the New Zealand round of the V8 Supercar championship fell through, Pukekohe was confirmed to once again play host for 2006 and 2007. From 2008, the round would change venues to a brand-new street race in Hamilton.

John Bowe would make his 200th V8 Supercar round start; joining Peter Brock, Dick Johnson and Glenn Seton as the only drivers achieved such a feat. His car was assigned the number 200 to commemorate the occasion.

The Holden Racing Team were issued a suspended $20,000 fine for exceeding the freight allowance set for the international event.

== Results ==
=== Qualifying ===
Pos.	No.	Driver	Team	Car	Time
1	888	(Australia) Craig Lowndes	Triple Eight Race Engineering	Ford Falcon (BA)	55.8074
2	2	(Australia) Mark Skaife	Holden Racing Team	Holden Commodore (VZ)	55.8380
3	6	(Australia) Jason Bright	Ford Performance Racing	Ford Falcon (BA)	55.8562
4	88	(Australia) Jamie Whincup	Triple Eight Race Engineering	Ford Falcon (BA)	55.8666
5	5	(Australia) Mark Winterbottom	Ford Performance Racing	Ford Falcon (BA)	55.8785
6	16	(Australia) Garth Tander	HSV Dealer Team	Holden Commodore (VZ)	55.8844
7	1	(Australia) Russell Ingall	Stone Brothers Racing	Ford Falcon (BA)	55.9203
8	15	(Australia) Rick Kelly	HSV Dealer Team	Holden Commodore (VZ)	56.1106
9	8	(Brazil) Max Wilson	WPS Racing	Ford Falcon (BA)	56.1476
10	51	(New Zealand) Greg Murphy	Paul Weel Racing	Holden Commodore (VZ)	56.1633
11	7	(New Zealand) Steven Richards	Perkins Engineering	Holden Commodore (VZ)	56.1726
12	3	(New Zealand) Jason Richards	Tasman Motorsport	Holden Commodore (VZ)	56.2498
13	11	(Australia) Paul Dumbrell	Perkins Engineering	Holden Commodore (VZ)	56.2595
14	22	(Australia) Todd Kelly	Holden Racing Team	Holden Commodore (VZ)	56.2794
15	4	(Australia) James Courtney	Stone Brothers Racing	Ford Falcon (BA)	56.3272
16	17	(Australia) Steven Johnson	Dick Johnson Racing	Ford Falcon (BA)	56.3974
17	200	(Australia) John Bowe	Brad Jones Racing	Ford Falcon (BA)	56.4141
18	50	(Australia) Cameron McConville	Paul Weel Racing	Holden Commodore (VZ)	56.4511
19	10	(Australia) Jason Bargwanna	WPS Racing	Ford Falcon (BA)	56.5380
20	18	(Australia) Will Davison	Dick Johnson Racing	Ford Falcon (BA)	56.5388
21	34	(Australia) Dean Canto	Garry Rogers Motorsport	Holden Commodore (VZ)	56.5432
22	021	(New Zealand) Paul Radisich	Team Kiwi Racing	Holden Commodore (VZ)	56.6596
23	33	(Australia) Lee Holdsworth	Garry Rogers Motorsport	Holden Commodore (VZ)	56.6647
24	67	(Australia) Paul Morris	Paul Morris Motorsport	Holden Commodore (VZ)	56.6973
25	23	(Australia) Andrew Jones	Tasman Motorsport	Holden Commodore (VZ)	56.7329
26	39	(New Zealand) Fabian Coulthard	Paul Morris Motorsport	Holden Commodore (VZ)	56.8556
27	25	(Australia) Warren Luff	Britek Motorsport	Ford Falcon (BA)	56.8622
28	14	(Australia) Brad Jones	Brad Jones Racing	Ford Falcon (BA)	56.8932
29	55	(Australia) Steve Owen	Rod Nash Racing	Holden Commodore (VZ)	56.9694
30	26	(New Zealand) Mark Porter	MSport	Holden Commodore (VZ)	57.1100
31	20	(Australia) Marcus Marshall	Paul Cruickshank Racing	Ford Falcon (BA)	57.7586

=== Top Ten Shootout ===
Pos.	No.	Driver	Team	Car	Time
1	16	(Australia) Garth Tander	HSV Dealer Team	Holden Commodore (VZ)	55.7253
2	2	(Australia) Mark Skaife	Holden Racing Team	Holden Commodore (VZ)	55.7930
3	888	(Australia) Craig Lowndes	Triple Eight Race Engineering	Ford Falcon (BA)	55.8742
4	1	(Australia) Russell Ingall	Stone Brothers Racing	Ford Falcon (BA)	55.9789
5	6	(Australia) Jason Bright	Ford Performance Racing	Ford Falcon (BA)	56.0083
6	5	(Australia) Mark Winterbottom	Ford Performance Racing	Ford Falcon (BA)	56.1302
7	88	(Australia) Jamie Whincup	Triple Eight Race Engineering	Ford Falcon (BA)	56.1637
8	15	(Australia) Rick Kelly	HSV Dealer Team	Holden Commodore (VZ)	56.1683
9	51	(New Zealand) Greg Murphy	Paul Weel Racing	Holden Commodore (VZ)	56.4231
10	8	(Brazil) Max Wilson	WPS Racing	Ford Falcon (BA)	1:07.4133

=== Race 1 ===
It didn't take long for chaos to ensue. Rick Kelly stalled at the start and left drivers scrambling every which way to avoid hitting the rear of his stranded car. A couple hundred meters down the road, cars began ricocheting off each other. Caught out in the melee was local favourite, Murphy. The damage sustained was enough to force him out of the race then and there.

To add to local fans woes, Paul Radisich was spun at the hairpin on the safety car restart and relegated him to the rear of the field. Tander was judged to have jumped the start and was issued a drive-through penalty. Mark Skaife assumed the lead of the race with Russell Ingall in hot pursuit. Andrew Jones was issued a drive-through penalty for failing to stay in formation at the safety car restart. A couple laps after taking said penalty, he slid off the track at turn one and spun. Teammate Jason Richards was struggling with faulty power steering. Multiple laps down, the Kiwi kept circulating for points and to attain a good grid slot for the reverse grid race on Sunday.

Rick Kelly was experiencing the unique issue of a faulty clutch from the opening laps. Aside from some difficulty in engaging first gear after his pitstop, Kelly managed to nurse his car to the end. With a handful of laps to go, Steven Richards slid off at the hairpin and lost a top five placing. Todd Kelly was also suffering from power steering issues and retired a few laps from home owing to a fire within the cockpit. For teammate Skaife however, there were no such issues. Winning his first race of the season ahead of Ingall, with Jason Bright rounding out the podium.

Pos.	No.	Driver	Team	Laps	Time / Retired	Grid
1	2	(Australia) Mark Skaife	Holden Racing Team	36	39min 35.1429sec	2
2	1	(Australia) Russell Ingall	Stone Brothers Racing	36	+ 1.422	4
3	6	(Australia) Jason Bright	Ford Performance Racing	36	+ 7.181	5
4	5	(Australia) Mark Winterbottom	Ford Performance Racing	36	+ 12.549	6
5	888	(Australia) Craig Lowndes	Triple Eight Race Engineering	36	+ 13.880	3
6	8	(Brazil) Max Wilson	WPS Racing	36	+ 22.732	10
7	7	(New Zealand) Steven Richards	Perkins Engineering	36	+ 24.485	11
8	4	(Australia) James Courtney	Stone Brothers Racing	36	+ 25.425	15
9	17	(Australia) Steven Johnson	Dick Johnson Racing	36	+ 26.260	16
10	11	(Australia) Paul Dumbrell	Perkins Engineering	36	+ 27.629	13
11	10	(Australia) Jason Bargwanna	WPS Racing	36	+ 28.312	19
12	15	(Australia) Rick Kelly	HSV Dealer Team	36	+ 28.892	8
13	50	(Australia) Cameron McConville	Paul Weel Racing	36	+ 29.193	18
14	67	(Australia) Paul Morris	Paul Morris Motorsport	36	+ 33.408	24
15	88	(Australia) Jamie Whincup	Triple Eight Race Engineering	36	+ 36.065	7
16	34	(Australia) Dean Canto	Garry Rogers Motorsport	36	+ 37.762	21
17	200	(Australia) John Bowe	Brad Jones Racing	36	+ 38.426	17
18	18	(Australia) Will Davison	Dick Johnson Racing	36	+ 38.628	20
19	33	(Australia) Lee Holdsworth	Garry Rogers Motorsport	36	+ 41.212	23
20	16	(Australia) Garth Tander	HSV Dealer Team	36	+ 43.501	1
21	021	(New Zealand) Paul Radisich	Team Kiwi Racing	36	+ 44.963	22
22	14	(Australia) Brad Jones	Brad Jones Racing	36	+ 47.046	28
23	26	(New Zealand) Mark Porter	MSport	36	+ 55.150	30
24	25	(Australia) Warren Luff	Britek Motorsport	35	+ 1 lap	27
25	55	(Australia) Steve Owen	Rod Nash Racing	35	+ 1 lap	29
26	20	(Australia) Marcus Marshall	Paul Cruickshank Racing	35	+ 1 lap	31
27	23	(Australia) Andrew Jones	Tasman Motorsport	34	+ 2 laps	25
28	3	(New Zealand) Jason Richards	Tasman Motorsport	29	+ 7 laps	12
Ret	22	(Australia) Todd Kelly	Holden Racing Team	29	Power steering	14
Ret	39	(New Zealand) Fabian Coulthard	Paul Morris Motorsport	16	Retired	26
Ret	51	(New Zealand) Greg Murphy	Paul Weel Racing	0	Accident	9
Fastest lap: Garth Tander (HSV Dealer Team), 0:56.4767

=== Race 2 ===
Miraculously, Paul Weel Racing were able to repair Murphy's car overnight in time for race two and would start from the pitlane. It was a reverse-grid race with both Tasman Motorsport cars starting on the front row; a silver lining to their torrid first race on Saturday.

Richards led away from his teammate with Steve Owen following through into third. Being the first reverse-grid race in four years, carnage was expected. And it did not disappoint. At the usual trouble spot of the hairpin, Warren Luff sent Mark Porter into a spin. In the process, the rear of Porter's car tagged Radisich, sending the Team Kiwi racer around as well. Porter and Luff got away but Radisich was left facing the wrong way. Dean Canto managed to stop in time, only for the following cars - who could not see the chaos ahead - to slam into the back of Canto and into Radisich. The incident inflicted extensive damage to the cars of Jamie Whincup, Bowe, Jason Bargwanna and Steven Richards. Along with the cosmetic damage, Richards' power steering had failed. Bargwanna's front spoiler had broken and trapped the front wheels, forcing him off into the gravel trap at the hairpin on the next lap. Predictably, all of this led to the deployment of the safety car. And to further compound these troubles, rain started to fall upon the circuit.

Aided with a fast car and optimal grid position, Tander began making his way up the order. Despite the threat of rain, drivers still came in for their compulsory stops as planned. Precipitation not sufficient to warrant concern amongst the teams. Luff was issued a drive-through penalty for his first lap misdemeanors. Bowe suffered a major crash at the end of the front straight as a result of a jammed throttle. With extensive damage inflicted upon the barrier, the red flag was thrown and the race was stopped. Because the race was effectively 'reset', the restart was conducted as a standing start. The regulations permitted Whincup and Radisich to take the restart despite 'retiring' before the red flag was shown.

Tander led away from Richards at the restart. Porter exacted his revenge on Luff on lap 13, only for the local driver having to retire from the race due to damage. McConville and Brad Jones came to blows at the hairpin, and multiple drivers behind inflicted damage upon each other. Jones came in to retire whilst Bright pitted for what he believed was a puncture. Whincup's race eventually came to an end due to mechanical problems. James Courtney was experiencing braking problems which led to him spinning Murphy at the ever-so-troublesome hairpin. Lowndes received a drive-through penalty for a driving infringement pertaining to Rick Kelly. Tander cruised home to victory with Jason Richards second and Mark Winterbottom in third.

Pos.	No.	Driver	Team	Laps	Time / Retired	Grid
1	16	(Australia) Garth Tander	HSV Dealer Team	47	55min 39.7648sec	8
2	3	(New Zealand) Jason Richards	Tasman Motorsport	47	+ 2.670	1
3	5	(Australia) Mark Winterbottom	Ford Performance Racing	47	+ 7.320	24
4	50	(Australia) Cameron McConville	Paul Weel Racing	47	+ 9.746	15
5	2	(Australia) Mark Skaife	Holden Racing Team	47	+ 16.417	27
6	1	(Australia) Russell Ingall	Stone Brothers Racing	47	+ 18.119	26
7	67	(Australia) Paul Morris	Paul Morris Motorsport	47	+ 19.834	14
8	18	(Australia) Will Davison	Dick Johnson Racing	47	+ 20.401	10
9	17	(Australia) Steven Johnson	Dick Johnson Racing	47	+ 20.619	19
10	15	(Australia) Rick Kelly	HSV Dealer Team	47	+ 26.493	16
11	11	(Australia) Paul Dumbrell	Perkins Engineering	47	+ 28.950	18
12	23	(Australia) Andrew Jones	Tasman Motorsport	47	+ 36.750	2
13	22	(Australia) Todd Kelly	Holden Racing Team	47	+ 37.145	29
14	39	(New Zealand) Fabian Coulthard	Paul Morris Motorsport	47	+ 44.708	28
15	51	(New Zealand) Greg Murphy	Paul Weel Racing	47	+ 44.904	30
16	33	(Australia) Lee Holdsworth	Garry Rogers Motorsport	47	+ 45.626	9
17	888	(Australia) Craig Lowndes	Triple Eight Race Engineering	46	+ 1 lap	23
18	4	(Australia) James Courtney	Stone Brothers Racing	46	+ 1 lap	20
19	20	(Australia) Marcus Marshall	Paul Cruickshank Racing	46	+ 1 lap	31
20	6	(Australia) Jason Bright	Ford Performance Racing	46	+ 1 lap	25
21	34	(Australia) Dean Canto	Garry Rogers Motorsport	46	+ 1 lap	12
22	25	(Australia) Warren Luff	Britek Motorsport	45	+ 2 laps	4
23	55	(Australia) Steve Owen	Rod Nash Racing	45	+ 2 laps	3
Ret	7	(New Zealand) Steven Richards	Perkins Engineering	35	Retired	21
Ret	021	(New Zealand) Paul Radisich	Team Kiwi Racing	33	Retired	7
Ret	10	(Australia) Jason Bargwanna	WPS Racing	26	Retired	17
Ret	14	(Australia) Brad Jones	Brad Jones Racing	17	Accident damage	6
Ret	88	(Australia) Jamie Whincup	Triple Eight Race Engineering	16	Mechanical	13
Ret	26	(New Zealand) Mark Porter	MSport	13	Accident damage	5
Ret	200	(Australia) John Bowe	Brad Jones Racing	7	Accident	11
Ret	8	(Brazil) Max Wilson	WPS Racing	7	Withdrawn	22
Fastest lap: Garth Tander (HSV Dealer Team), 0:56.6930

=== Race 3 ===
The grid order was set based on an aggregate of results from races one and two. This left Skaife on pole position with Ingall alongside him on the front row. Extensive damage to the car meant Bowe would not start the final race.

Off the line, Bright bogged down heavily and rapidly fell down the order. Skaife established an affirmative lead while the rest of the pack finally managed to negotiate the hairpin without wanton destruction. Johnson held a strong fourth place but flat-spotted the tyres in the opening laps and ceded position to Lowndes. Winterbottom meanwhile was leaning heavily on Skaife for the lead after the pitstop cycle had finished; the Ford Performance Racing driver paying back the faith put into him after a tricky first couple of years as a main game driver. Will Davison struggled with the handling of his car under brakes and careened into the wall at turn two. He was able to continue the race, but only after being freed from the tyre bundle by the marshals. With marshals on a live race track, the safety car was brought out.

Max Wilson speared off the circuit with suspension damage and retired from the race. Todd Kelly's weekend was further compounded when he locked up into the hairpin, flat-spotting his front tyres, forcing him to pit, and fell toward the tail-end of the field. Winterbottom's charge began to fade and started to fall into the clutches of Lowndes. Dean Canto's car was leaking fluid and eventually expired with a handful of laps to go. Up the front, Skaife remained untroubled to the flag to take his first round win since Bathurst last year. In controversial circumstances, Lowndes finished in second after performing what looked to be a bump-and-run on Winterbottom, who finished in third.

Pos.	No.	Driver	Team	Laps	Time / Retired	Grid
1	2	(Australia) Mark Skaife	Holden Racing Team	50	50min 57.1288sec	1
2	888	(Australia) Craig Lowndes	Triple Eight Race Engineering	50	+ 3.667	6
3	5	(Australia) Mark Winterbottom	Ford Performance Racing	50	+ 4.358	3
4	16	(Australia) Garth Tander	HSV Dealer Team	50	+ 6.112	12
5	1	(Australia) Russell Ingall	Stone Brothers Racing	50	+ 7.135	2
6	7	(New Zealand) Steven Richards	Perkins Engineering	50	+ 7.775	15
7	15	(Australia) Rick Kelly	HSV Dealer Team	50	+ 17.967	9
8	4	(Australia) James Courtney	Stone Brothers Racing	50	+ 18.776	10
9	17	(Australia) Steven Johnson	Dick Johnson Racing	50	+ 19.923	5
10	88	(Australia) Jamie Whincup	Triple Eight Race Engineering	50	+ 20.220	20
11	11	(Australia) Paul Dumbrell	Perkins Engineering	50	+ 21.962	8
12	67	(Australia) Paul Morris	Paul Morris Motorsport	50	+ 22.921	11
13	10	(Australia) Jason Bargwanna	WPS Racing	50	+ 25.323	18
14	021	(New Zealand) Paul Radisich	Team Kiwi Racing	50	+ 25.547	26
15	51	(New Zealand) Greg Murphy	Paul Weel Racing	50	+ 25.865	30
16	33	(Australia) Lee Holdsworth	Garry Rogers Motorsport	50	+ 36.709	17
17	23	(Australia) Andrew Jones	Tasman Motorsport	50	+ 38.047	21
18	14	(Australia) Brad Jones	Brad Jones Racing	50	+ 43.601	27
19	3	(New Zealand) Jason Richards	Tasman Motorsport	49	+ 1 lap	19
20	6	(Australia) Jason Bright	Ford Performance Racing	49	+ 1 lap	4
21	39	(New Zealand) Fabian Coulthard	Paul Morris Motorsport	49	+ 1 lap	29
22	55	(Australia) Steve Owen	Rod Nash Racing	49	+ 1 lap	25
23	50	(Australia) Cameron McConville	Paul Weel Racing	49	+ 1 lap	7
24	26	(New Zealand) Mark Porter	MSport	49	+ 1 lap	31
25	22	(Australia) Todd Kelly	Holden Racing Team	49	+ 1 lap	28
26	25	(Australia) Warren Luff	Britek Motorsport	49	+ 1 lap	23
27	20	(Australia) Marcus Marshall	Paul Cruickshank Racing	48	+ 2 laps	24
28	18	(Australia) Will Davison	Dick Johnson Racing	41	+ 8 laps	13
Ret	34	(Australia) Dean Canto	Garry Rogers Motorsport	45	Fuel leak	16
Ret	8	(Brazil) Max Wilson	WPS Racing	29	Suspension	14
DNS	200	(Australia) John Bowe	Brad Jones Racing		Did not start	22
Fastest lap: Russell Ingall (Stone Brothers Racing), 0:56.5219

== Aftermath ==
=== Championship standings ===
Pos.	No	Driver	Team	Pts
1	1	(Australia) Russell Ingall	Stone Brothers Racing	540
2	15	(Australia) Rick Kelly	HSV Dealer Team	539
3	16	(Australia) Garth Tander	HSV Dealer Team	502
4	7	(New Zealand) Steven Richards	Perkins Engineering	482
5	17	(Australia) Steven Johnson	Dick Johnson Racing	475
