= Garth Tander =

Australian racing driver

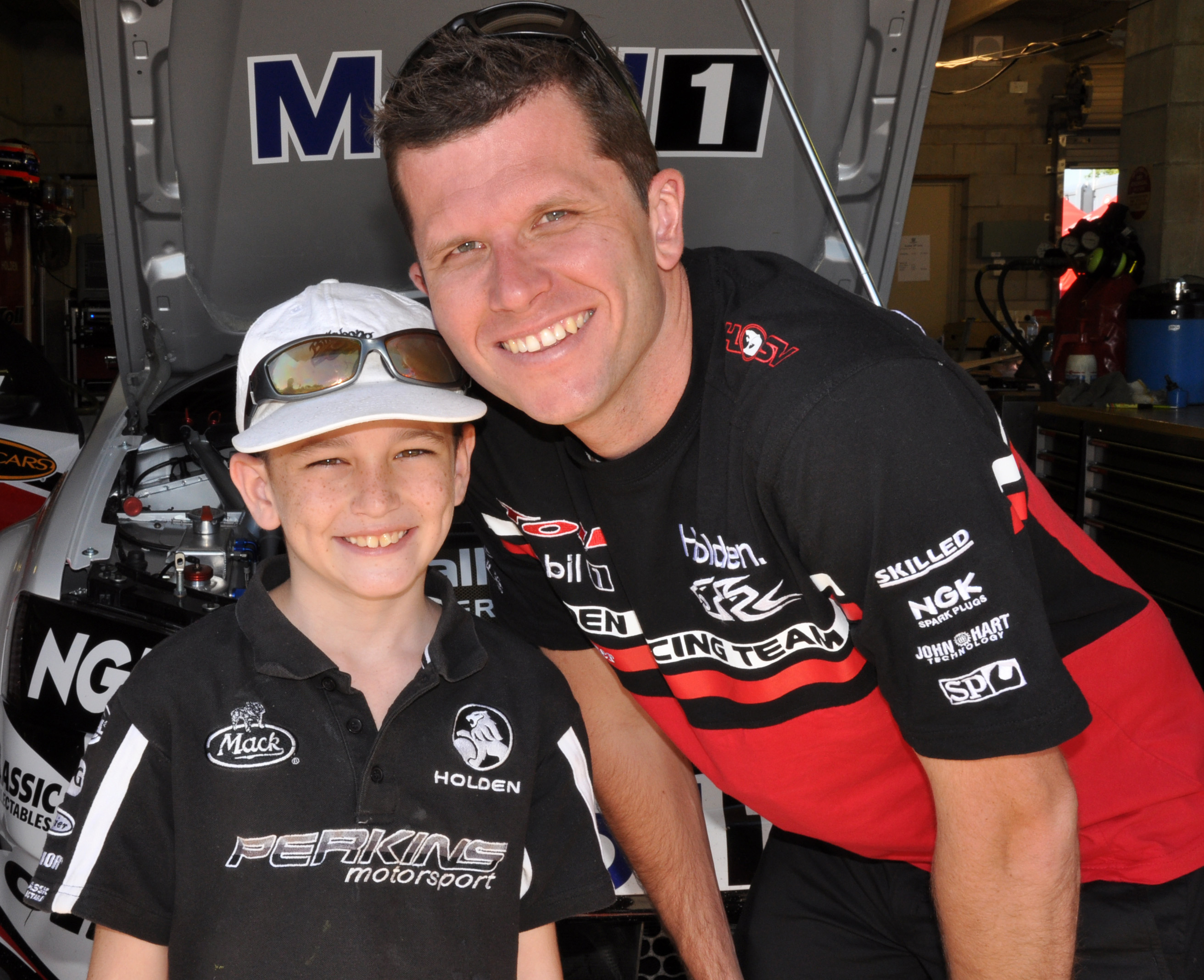
- Tander (right) with a fan at the 2010 Darwin Triple Crown
- Nationality: Australian
- Born: Garth Dirk Tander; 31 March 1977 (age 49) Perth, Western Australia
- Relatives: Leanne Ferrier (ex-wife)
- Categorisation: FIA Platinum

Supercars Championship career
- Championships: 1 (2007)
- Races: 650
- Wins: 58
- Podiums: 155
- Pole positions: 31
- 2007 position: 1st (625 pts)

Garth Dirk Tander (born 31 March 1977) is an Australian former motor racing driver who competed in the Supercars Championship from 1998 to 2025. He was the 2007 champion for the HSV Dealer Team and claimed 57 wins, including six at Australia's most prestigious domestic race, the Bathurst 1000.

Tander also owns a motor racing team TanderSport.

== Early career ==
As a child, Tander started racing go karts at Tiger Kart Club in WA, and by the time he was 17 years old, he had won seven state titles and one Australian title.

Tander was Australian Formula Ford champion in 1997.

After failing to find a budget to run in Formula Holden in 1998, Tander was offered the seat in one of Garry Rogers Motorsport's V8 Supercars.

== Professional career ==
=== Garry Rogers Motorsport ===
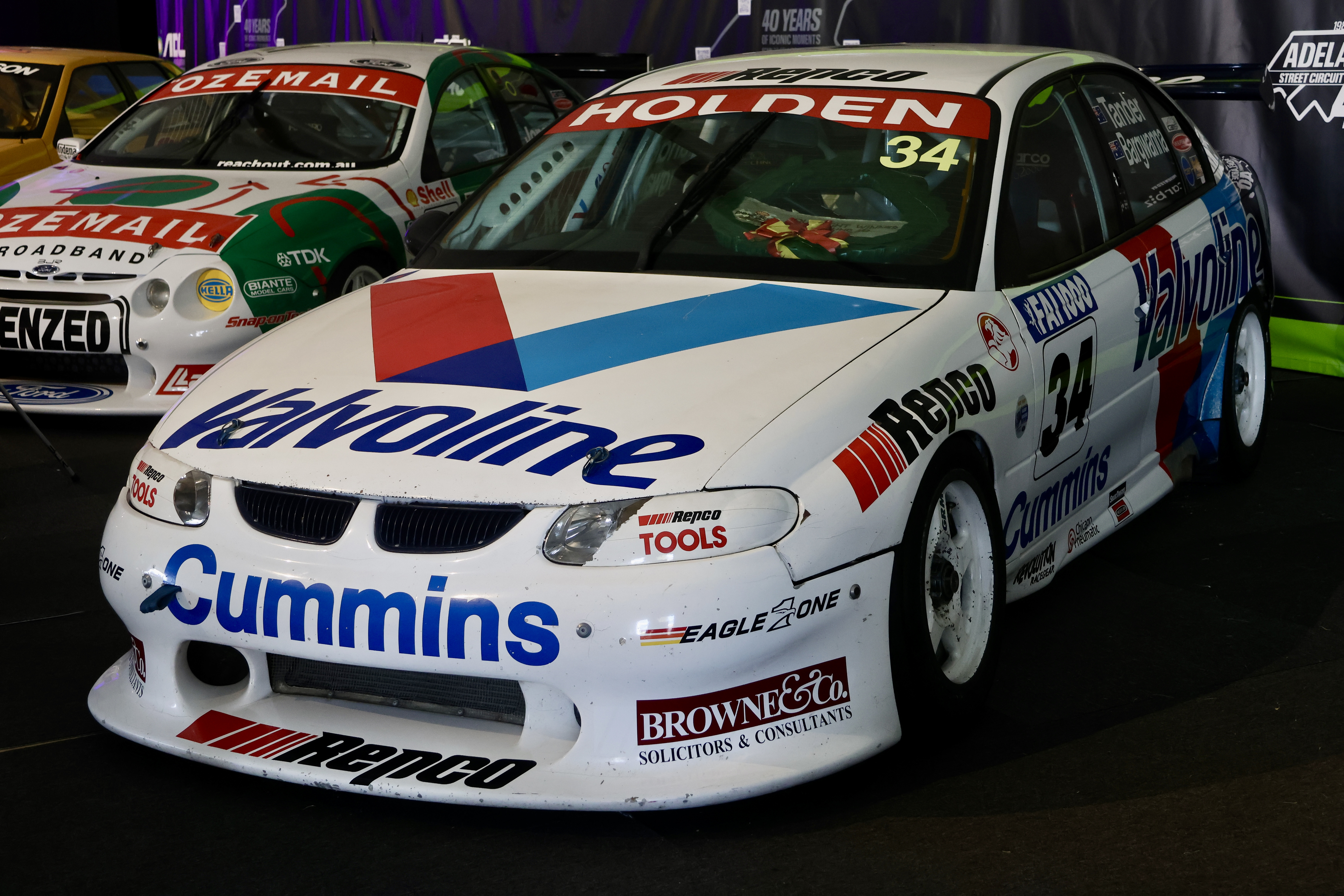
Holden Commodore (VT) of Tander on display at the 2025 Adelaide Grand Final

Tander finished second in the 2000 championship taking the championship to the last round where he was beaten by now five-time championship winner Mark Skaife. After winning the famous Bathurst 1000 race in 2000 with Jason Bargwanna, he found limited success.

Tander was the winner of the first Bathurst 24hr race driving a modified Holden Monaro 427C running a 7.0L (427cui) motor rather than the 5.7L Gen III that the road car runs. He co-drove this race with Steven Richards, Cameron McConville and Nathan Pretty while driving for V8 Supercar team boss Garry Rogers Motorsport. Tander was widely tipped to drive the Monaro for GRM in the Australian Nations Cup Championship in 2003 but concentrated instead on V8 Supercars with the drive going to Nathan Pretty. In the 2003 Bathurst 24 Hour Tander, again driving the very same Monaro from 2002 with the same co-drivers in the same team, came second to the team's second Monaro driven by Peter Brock, Greg Murphy, Jason Bright and Todd Kelly. Driving at the end, Tander finished only 0.2 seconds behind Greg Murphy with Tander setting the race's fastest lap on lap 526, the second last of the race. The GRM Monaro's led the race throughout and finished 13 laps ahead of the third place Porsche 911 GT3 RC.

In 2004, Tander remained at Garry Rogers Motorsport but it was announced in the early part of the season that he would not be returning to the team in 2005. His season started poorly at Adelaide with a DNF in Race 1 and he was unable to even start Race 2. The rest of the year improved slightly for Garth with his stand out results being 4th overall for the Round at Barbagallo and Sandown. He ended the year 11th in the Championship. In November 2004 it was announced that Garth would move to the HSV Dealer Team on a 3-year deal starting in 2005.

=== HSV Dealer Team ===
In 2005, Tander moved to a newly renamed team, the HSV Dealer Team (formerly K-Mart Racing Team) partnered with dual Bathurst winner Rick Kelly.

Tander was leading the V8 Supercar championship in 2006 after six rounds, but a disastrous round in Oran Park lost him the championship lead. The endurance races following were no better. Tander participated in a highly controversial driver swap with the Holden Racing Team which involved Todd Kelly coming to the HSV Dealer Team. Garth and co-driver Mark Skaife dominated the entire Sandown round until a broken steering problem destroyed the almost certain victory. At the next round at Bathurst, the car's clutch failed off the line and was hit from the rear by another car before the second turn on lap one. After a crushing end to his Bathurst 1000 campaign, Tander was visibly upset, probably realising that his run at the V8 Supercar title was all but over. The car had been near on fastest in every practice and qualifying session prior to the race on the Sunday.

For the second year in a row, Tander won the Symmons Plains round, winning two of the three races, even with engine troubles resulting in the car running on seven cylinders. During race one, someone rear-ended him from first to finish fourth with a few laps to go.

Tander raced the #16 Toll HSV Commodore in 2007, and won the second round (held at Barbagallo Raceway in his home state of Western Australia), winning all three 50-lap races. He also repeated this at Queensland Raceway. This saw him take the points lead from his teammate Rick Kelly. Late in the season, Tander had a disappointment at Bathurst where brake issues forced his retirement, but at Surfers Paradise and Bahrain he scored solid points to take the lead in the championship back off Jamie Whincup. At the penultimate Symmons Plains round in Tasmania, Tander won the first race, before a slow pitstop in the second race dropped him to tenth. A clash with Steven Richards over second position broke his steering column, ending the third race prematurely.

Tander claimed the 2007 V8 Supercars Championship, just two points ahead of Jamie Whincup with Craig Lowndes in third, and defending champ Rick Kelly in fourth. All four were in contention for the title in the Grand Finale. His round win at Philip Island also saw Holden secure the manufacturers title, and Toll HSV Dealer Team took the teams championship.

=== Holden Racing Team ===
In 2008, Tander moved to Holden Racing Team after three years at the HSV Dealer Team. Tander had a bad start to the season with a DNF in both races at the Clipsal 500, His first round win of 2008 came in New Zealand at the Hamilton 400, his second round win came at Winton in July, Tander and his teammate Mark Skaife won the first enduro at the L & H 500 at Philip Island and Tander was looking strong at the Supercheap Auto Bathurst 1000 but a slipping clutch spoilt a pole position start. 100 laps later his co-driver Mark Skaife crashed lightly into the wall coming up to Forrests Elbow, ending their chances of a win.

Tander came third in the 2008 V8 Supercars Championship season behind Mark Winterbottom and series champion Jamie Whincup. Tander won the Bathurst 1000 twice in 2009 with Will Davison and in 2011 with Nick Percat.

In 2013, with the introduction of the Car of the Future, Holden Racing Team (along with all other teams competing with Holdens) changed over to the newer VF Commodore. This season gave Tander limited and inconsistent success. He managed to clock up five podium finishes, including a win at both Townsville and Phillip Island. He finished the 2013 Championship in eighth place. In 2015, Tander won the Enduro Cup driving with Warren Luff, despite not winning any of the endurance races.

In 2016, Tander has slammed Jamie Whincup's "pretty desperate" move that triggered a disastrous chain-reaction, sending the Holden Racing Team driver crashing into the wall and ending his 2016 hopes. Whincup was hit with a 15-second penalty for the driving infringement, while Volvo driver Scott McLaughlin was to face post-race investigation for dangerous re-entry. Tander, who was fourth and in pursuit of his second enduro win after his stunning victory at Sandown, said immediately after the incident he blamed Whincup for starting the chain reaction.

=== Garry Rogers Motorsport ===
Tander rejoined GRM at the start of the 2017 season. He spent two years with GRM but was unexpectedly dumped by the team just before the start of the 2019 season.

=== Triple Eight Race Engineering ===
Without a full-time drive, Tander was signed by Triple Eight Race Engineering to be a co-driver to Shane Van Gisbergen for the endurance races. Tander won the 2020 and 2022 Bathurst 1000's with the team.

=== Grove Racing ===
For the 2023 Endurance races, Tander moved to Grove Racing to drive a Ford for the first time in his Supercars Career. In 2023 he partnered David Reynolds for both the Sandown 500 and Bathurst 1000 in the #26 car. For 2024, he moved across to partner Matthew Payne in the #19 Car. Tander and Payne would remain together for the 2025 season, and would win the rain-influenced 2025 Bathurst 1000 in spectacular fashion.

=== Retirement ===
In November 2025, Tander formally announced his retirement from Supercars racing.

== Personal life ==
Tander was married to his ex-wife Leanne from 2004 to 2022. Tander is father to two children, Scarlet and Sebastian.

== Career results ==
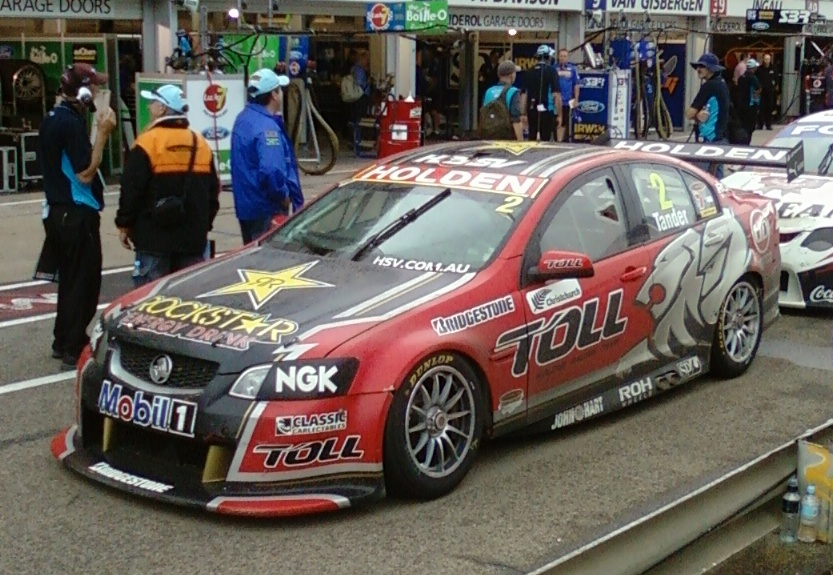
The Holden VE Commodore of Garth Tander at the 2011 Clipsal 500 Adelaide

Season	Series	Position	Car	Team
1996	Australian Formula Ford Championship	17th	Van Diemen RF95 Ford	Fastlane Racing
1997	Australian Formula Ford Championship	1st	Van Diemen RF95 Ford	Fastlane Racing
1998	Australian Touring Car Championship	14th	Holden VS Commodore	Garry Rogers Motorsport
1999	Shell Championship Series	5th	Holden VS Commodore; Holden VT Commodore	Garry Rogers Motorsport
2000	Shell Championship Series	2nd	Holden VT Commodore	Garry Rogers Motorsport
2001	Shell Championship Series	10th	Holden VX Commodore	Garry Rogers Motorsport
2002	V8 Supercar Championship Series	10th	Holden VX Commodore	Garry Rogers Motorsport
2003	V8 Supercar Championship Series	12th	Holden VY Commodore	Garry Rogers Motorsport
2004	V8 Supercar Championship Series	11th	Holden VY Commodore	Garry Rogers Motorsport
2005	V8 Supercar Championship Series	6th	Holden VZ Commodore	HSV Dealer Team
2006	V8 Supercar Championship Series	4th	Holden VZ Commodore	HSV Dealer Team; Holden Racing Team
2007	V8 Supercar Championship Series	1st	Holden VE Commodore	HSV Dealer Team
2008	V8 Supercar Championship Series	3rd	Holden VE Commodore	Holden Racing Team
2009	V8 Supercar Championship Series	3rd	Holden VE Commodore	Holden Racing Team
2010	V8 Supercar Championship Series	5th	Holden VE Commodore	Holden Racing Team
2011	International V8 Supercars Championship	5th	Holden VE Commodore	Holden Racing Team
2012	International V8 Supercars Championship	7th	Holden VE Commodore	Holden Racing Team
2013	International V8 Supercars Championship	8th	Holden VF Commodore	Holden Racing Team
2014	International V8 Supercars Championship	9th	Holden VF Commodore	Holden Racing Team
2014	Australian GT Championship	8th	Aston Martin Vantage GT3	VIP Petfoods
2015	International V8 Supercars Championship	6th	Holden VF Commodore	Holden Racing Team
2015	Pirtek Enduro Cup	1st	Holden VF Commodore	Holden Racing Team
2015	Australian GT Championship	19th	McLaren 650S GT3	Darrell Lea
2016	International V8 Supercars Championship	9th	Holden VF Commodore	Holden Racing Team
2017	Virgin Australia Supercars Championship	9th	Holden VF Commodore	Garry Rogers Motorsport
2018	Virgin Australia Supercars Championship	13th	Holden ZB Commodore	Garry Rogers Motorsport
2019	Virgin Australia Supercars Championship	27th	Holden ZB Commodore	Triple Eight Race Engineering
2019	TCR Australia	10th	Audi RS 3 LMS TCR	Melbourne Performance Centre
2019	Australian Toyota 86 Racing Series	28th	Toyota 86	Toyota Australia
2020	Virgin Australia Supercars Championship	26th	Holden ZB Commodore	Triple Eight Race Engineering
2021	Virgin Australia Supercars Championship	42nd	Holden ZB Commodore	Triple Eight Race Engineering
2021	TCR Australia	21st	Audi RS 3 LMS TCR	Melbourne Performance Centre
2022	GT World Challenge Australia - Pro/Am	7th	Audi R8 LMS Evo II	The Bend Motorsport Park
2022	Supercars Championship	27th	Holden ZB Commodore	Triple Eight Race Engineering
2023	Porsche Carrera Cup Australia - Pro	24th	Porsche 911 GT3 Cup 992	SP Tools Racing
2023	Repco Australia Supercars Championship	41st	Ford Mustang GT	Grove Racing
2024	Porsche Carrera Cup Australia - Pro	22nd	Porsche 911 GT3 Cup 992	Grove Racing
2024	Repco Australia Supercars Championship	41st	Ford Mustang GT	Grove Racing
2025	Supercars Endurance Cup	1st	Ford Mustang GT	Grove Racing
2025	Repco Australia Supercars Championship	25th	Ford Mustang GT	Grove Racing

=== Supercars Championship results ===
Supercars results
Year	Team	Car	1	2	3	4	5	6	7	8	9	10	11	12	13	14	15	16	17	18	19	20	21	22	23	24	25	26	27	28	29	30	31	32	33	34	35	36	37	38	39	Position	Points
1998	Garry Rogers Motorsport	Holden VS Commodore	SAN; R1	SAN; R2	SAN; R3	SYM; R4	SYM; R5	SYM; R6	LAK; R7	LAK; R8	LAK; R9	PHI; R10; 20	PHI; R11; 15	PHI; R12; 12	WIN; R13; 19	WIN; R14; 13	WIN; R15; 16	MAL; R16; 14	MAL; R17; 22	MAL; R18; 12	BAR; R19; 9	BAR; R20; 8	BAR; R21; 9	CAL; R22; 6	CAL; R23; 9	CAL; R24; C	HID; R25; 21	HID; R26; DSQ	HID; R27; 8	ORA; R28; 8	ORA; R29; 6	ORA; R30; 6										14th	301
1999	Garry Rogers Motorsport	Holden VS Commodore	EAS; R1; 4	EAS; R2; 4	EAS; R3; 3	ADE; R4; 24	BAR; R5; 10	BAR; R6; Ret	BAR; R7; 7	PHI; R8; 8	PHI; R9; 9	PHI; R10; Ret	HID; R11; 5	HID; R12; 6	HID; R13; 2	SAN; R14; 7	SAN; R15; 4	SAN; R16; 3	QLD; R17; 2	QLD; R18; 3	QLD; R19; 2	CAL; R20; 5	CAL; R21; 4	CAL; R22; 1	SYM; R23; 8	SYM; R24; 4	SYM; R25; Ret	WIN; R26; 3	WIN; R27; 4	WIN; R28; 6												5th	1470
1999	Garry Rogers Motorsport	Holden VT Commodore																													ORA; R29; 5	ORA; R30; 4	ORA; R31; 4	QLD; R32; 2	BAT; R33; Ret							5th	1470
2000	Garry Rogers Motorsport	Holden VT Commodore	PHI; R1; 2	PHI; R2; 2	BAR; R3; 3	BAR; R4; 4	BAR; R5; 2	ADE; R6; 3	ADE; R7; 2	EAS; R8; 3	EAS; R9; 33	EAS; R10; 10	HID; R11; 4	HID; R12; 2	HID; R13; 1	CAN; R14; 25	CAN; R15; 21	CAN; R16; Ret	QLD; R17; 6	QLD; R18; 4	QLD; R19; 4	WIN; R20; 1	WIN; R21; 2	WIN; R22; 18	OR; R23; 3	ORA; R24; 4	ORA; R25; 2	CA; R26; 5	CA; R27; 3	CA; R28; 3	QLD; R29; 2	SAN; R30; 6	SAN; R31; 10	SAN; R32; 6	BAT; R33; 1							2nd	1433
2001	Garry Rogers Motorsport	Holden VX Commodore	PHI; R1; 22	PHI; R2; 12	ADE; R3; 6	ADE; R4; 19	EAS; R5; 20	EAS; R6; 10	HID; R7; Ret	HID; R8; 17	HID; R9; 14	CAN; R10; 4	CAN; R11; 7	CAN; R12; 2	BAR; R13; 23	BAR; R14; 14	BAR; R15; 8	CAL; R16; 10	CAL; R17; 8	CAL; R18; 7	ORA; R19; 6	ORA; R20; 16	QLD; R21; 15	WI; R22; 10	WIN; R23; 24	BAT; R24; 6	PUK; R25; 7	PUK; R26; 7	PUK; R27; 16	SAN; R28; 16	SAN; R29; 21	SAN; R30; Ret										10th	2047
2002	Garry Rogers Motorsport	Holden VX Commodore	ADE; R1; 6	ADE; R2; 6	PHI; R3; 24	PHI; R4; 6	EAS; R5; 8	EAS; R6; 4	EAS; R7; 3	HDV; R8; 15	HDV; R9; 7	HDV; R10; 8	CAN; R11; 7	CAN; R12; 7	CAN; R13; Ret	BAR; R14; 31	BAR; R15; 25	BAR; R16; 6	ORA; R17; 10	ORA; R18; 9	WIN; R19; 6	WIN; R20; 5	QLD; R21; 3	BAT; R22; Ret	SUR; R23; 16	SUR; R24; 4	PUK; R25; Ret	PUK; R26; Ret	PUK; R27; 14	SAN; R28; 8	SAN; R29; Ret											10th	885
2003	Garry Rogers Motorsport	Holden VY Commodore	ADE; R1; 13	ADE; R1; 15	PHI; R3; 4	EAS; R4; 6	WIN; R5; Ret	BAR; R6; 9	BAR; R7; 5	BAR; R8; 5	HDV; R9; 4	HDV; R10; 3	HDV; R11; 24	QLD; R12; 25	ORA; R13; 4	SAN; R14; 18	BAT; R15; 19	SUR; R16; 16	SUR; R17; Ret	PUK; R18; 3	PUK; R19; Ret	PUK; R20; 21	EAS; R21; 22	EAS; R22; 5																		12th	1470
2004	Garry Rogers Motorsport	Holden VY Commodore	ADE; R1; 19	ADE; R2; DNS	EAS; R3; 3	PUK; R4; 28	PUK; R5; 11	PUK; R6; 10	HDV; R7; 15	HDV; R8; 20	HDV; R9; 8	BAR; R10; 5	BAR; R11; 5	BAR; R12; 6	QLD; R13; 3	WIN; R14; 9	ORA; R15; 21	ORA; R16; 28	SAN; R17; 4	BAT; R18; Ret	SUR; R19; 22	SUR; R20; 11	SYM; R21; 5	SYM; R22; 28	SYM; R23; Ret	EAS; R24; Ret	EAS; R25; 18	EAS; R26; 10														11th	1396
2005	HSV Dealer Team	Holden VZ Commodore	ADE; R1; 7	ADE; R2; Ret	PUK; R3; 17	PUK; R4; 20	PUK; R5; 9	BAR; R6; 29	BAR; R7; 14	BAR; R8; 13	EAS; R9; 9	EAS; R10; 10	SHA; R11; 12	SHA; R12; 21	SHA; R13; 22	HDV; R14; 5	HDV; R15; 3	HDV; R16; 1	QLD; R17; 3	ORA; R18; 26	ORA; R19; 5	SAN; R20; 4	BAT; R21; 16	SUR; R22; 10	SUR; R23; 4	SUR; R24; 4	SYM; R25; 1	SYM; R26; 1	SYM; R27; 1	PHI; R28; 2	PHI; R29; 2	PHI; R30; 4										6th	1734
2006	HSV Dealer Team	Holden VZ Commodore	ADE; R1; 8	ADE; R2; 4	PUK; R3; 20	PUK; R4; 1	PUK; R5; 4	BAR; R6; 4	BAR; R7; 10	BAR; R8; 5	WIN; R9; 6	WIN; R10; 10	WIN; R11; 5	HDV; R12; 5	HDV; R13; 8	HDV; R14; 3	QLD; R15; 1	QLD; R16; 2	QLD; R17; 1	ORA; R18; Ret	ORA; R19; 21	ORA; R20; 5	SAN; R21; 26	BAT; R22; Ret	SUR; R23; 2	SUR; R24; 1	SUR; R25; 19	SYM; R26; 4	SYM; R27; 1	SYM; R28; 1	BHR; R29; 2	BHR; R30; 1	BHR; R31; 8	PHI; R32; 2	PHI; R33; 18	PHI; R34; 2						4th	2965
2007	HSV Dealer Team	Holden VE Commodore	ADE; R1; 6	ADE; R2; 10	BAR; R3; 1	BAR; R4; 1	BAR; R5; 1	PUK; R6; 1	PUK; R7; 1	PUK; R8; 8	WIN; R9; 4	WIN; R10; 1	WIN; R11; 1	EAS; R12; 5	EAS; R13; 15	EAS; R14; 5	HDV; R15; 6	HDV; R16; 3	HDV; R17; 3	QLD; R18; 1	QLD; R19; 1	QLD; R20; 1	ORA; R21; Ret	ORA; R22; 19	ORA; R23; 2	SAN; R24; 4	BAT; R25; Ret	SUR; R26; 1	SUR; R27; 1	SUR; R28	BHR; R29; 2	BHR; R30; 14	BHR; R31; 4	SYM; R32; 1	SYM; R33; 10	SYM; R34; Ret	PHI; R35; 1	PHI; R36; 1	PHI; R37; 4			1st	625
2008	Holden Racing Team	Holden VE Commodore	ADE; R1; 23	ADE; R2; 19	EAS; R3; 1	EAS; R4; 9	EAS; R5; 3	HAM; R6; 1	HAM; R7; 1	HAM; R8; 1	BAR; R29; 3	BAR; R10; 2	BAR; R11; 2	SAN; R12; 5	SAN; R13; 9	SAN; R14; 12	HDV; R15; 3	HDV; R16; 1	HDV; R17; 3	QLD; R18; 4	QLD; R19; 4	QLD; R20; 4	WIN; R21; 3	WIN; R22; 3	WIN; R23; 1	PHI; QR; 7	PHI; R24; 1	BAT; R25; 12	SUR; R26; 2	SUR; R27; 2	SUR; R28; 2	BHR; R29; 14	BHR; R30; 11	BHR; R31; 23	SYM; R32; 20	SYM; R33; 8	SYM; R34; 5	ORA; R35; 6	ORA; R36; 1	ORA; R37; 2		3rd	3048
2009	Holden Racing Team	Holden VE Commodore	ADE; R1; Ret	ADE; R2; 3	HAM; R3; 11	HAM; R4; 9	WIN; R5; 8	WIN; R6; 3	SYM; R7; 1	SYM; R8; 12	HDV; R9; 4	HDV; R10; 5	TOW; R11; 3	TOW; R12; 3	SAN; R13; 17	SAN; R14; 1	QLD; R15; Ret	QLD; R16; 14	PHI; QR; 19	PHI; R17; 1	BAT; R18; 1	SUR; R19; 2	SUR; R20; 1	SUR; R21; 3	SUR; R22; 2	PHI; R23; 4	PHI; R24; 3	BAR; R25; 11	BAR; R26; 3	SYD; R27; 1	SYD; R28; Ret											3rd	2916
2010	Holden Racing Team	Holden VE Commodore	YMC; R1; 26	YMC; R2; Ret	BHR; R3; 4	BHR; R4; Ret	ADE; R5; 1	ADE; R6; 1	HAM; R7; 2	HAM; R8; 2	QLD; R9; 5	QLD; R10; 2	WIN; R11; 17	WIN; R12; 8	HDV; R13; 10	HDV; R14; 19	TOW; R15; 2	TOW; R16; 3	PHI; QR; 4	PHI; R17; 9	BAT; R18; 3	SUR; R19; 1	SUR; R20; Ret	SYM; R21; 2	SYM; R22; 6	SAN; R23; Ret	SAN; R24; 17	SYD; R25; Ret	SYD; R26; 9													5th	2466
2011	Holden Racing Team	Holden VE Commodore	YMC; R1; 6	YMC; R2; Ret	ADE; R3; 1	ADE; R4; 5	HAM; R5; 18	HAM; R6; 3	BAR; R7; 13	BAR; R8; 7	BAR; R9; 3	WIN; R10; 12	WIN; R11; 3	HID; R12; 18	HID; R13; 26	TOW; R14; 1	TOW; R15; 26	QLD; R16; 28	QLD; R17; 23	QLD; R18; 6	PHI; QR; 2	PHI; R19; 4	BAT; R20; 1	SUR; R21; 11	SUR; R22; 23	SYM; R23; 3	SYM; R24; 6	SAN; R25; 8	SAN; R26; 5	SYD; R27; 2	SYD; R28; 19											5th	2574
2012	Holden Racing Team	Holden VE Commodore	ADE; R1; 3	ADE; R2; 3	SYM; R3; 7	SYM; R4; 22	HAM; R5; 3	HAM; R6; 26	BAR; R7; Ret	BAR; R8; 10	BAR; R9; 14	PHI; R10; 4	PHI; R11; 10	HID; R12; 8	HID; R13; 9	TOW; R14; 3	TOW; R15; 4	QLD; R16; 27	QLD; R17; 15	SMP; R18; 4	SMP; R19; 9	SAN; QR; 3	SAN; R20; 4	BAT; R21; 25	SUR; R22; 4	SUR; R23; 5	YMC; R24; 7	YMC; R25; 5	YMC; R26; 7	WIN; R27; 8	WIN; R28; 13	SYD; R29; 21	SYD; R30; 16									7th	2462
2013	Holden Racing Team	Holden VF Commodore	ADE; R1; 7	ADE; R2; Ret	SYM; R3; 5	SYM; R4; 2	SYM; R5; 10	PUK; R6; 6	PUK; R7; 3	PUK; R8; 5	PUK; R9; 2	BAR; R10; 19	BAR; R11; 11	BAR; R12; 9	COA; R13; 5	COA; R14; 13	COA; R15; 6	COA; R16; 4	HID; R17; 13	HID; R18; 9	HID; R19; 5	TOW; R20; 8	TOW; R21; 1	QLD; R22; 8	QLD; R23; 11	QLD; R24; 21	WIN; R25; 8	WIN; R26; 23	WIN; R27; 4	SAN; QR; 13	SAN; R28; 22	BAT; R29; 4	SUR; R30; 18	SUR; R31; 7	PHI; R32; 1	PHI; R33; 10	PHI; R34; 15	SYD; R35; 14	SYD; R36; Ret			8th	2322
2014	Holden Racing Team	Holden VF Commodore	ADE; R1; 11	ADE; R2; 7	ADE; R3; 13	SYM; R4; 6	SYM; R5; 6	SYM; R6; 25	WIN; R7; 15	WIN; R8; 21	WIN; R9; 23	PUK; R10; 9	PUK; R11; 9	PUK; R12; 5	PUK; R13; 12	BAR; R14; 15	BAR; R15; 11	BAR; R16; 22	HID; R17; 5	HID; R18; 4	HID; R19; 6	TOW; R20; 2	TOW; R21; 1	TOW; R22; 2	QLD; R23; 8	QLD; R24; 8	QLD; R25; 9	SMP; R26; 2	SMP; R27; Ret	SMP; R28; 18	SAN; QR; 5	SAN; R29; 3	BAT; R30; DNS	SUR; R31; 9	SUR; R32; 12	PHI; R33; 4	PHI; R34; 4	PHI; R35; 2	SYD; R36; 10	SYD; R37; 10	SYD; R38; 2	9th	2289
2015	Holden Racing Team	Holden VF Commodore	ADE; R1; 7	ADE; R2; 4	ADE; R3; 3	SYM; R4; 8	SYM; R5; 5	SYM; R6; 4	BAR; R7; Ret	BAR; R8; 11	BAR; R9; 6	WIN; R10; 16	WIN; R11; Ret	WIN; R12; 5	HID; R13; 20	HID; R14; 8	HID; R15; 12	TOW; R16; 7	TOW; R17; 4	QLD; R18; 13	QLD; R19; 12	QLD; R20; 5	SMP; R21; 18	SMP; R22; 11	SMP; R23; 12	SAN; QR; 12	SAN; R24; 4	BAT; R25; 3	SUR; R26; 4	SUR; R27; 3	PUK; R28; 10	PUK; R29; 10	PUK; R30; 10	PHI; R31; 8	PHI; R32; 13	PHI; R33; 9	SYD; R34; 22	SYD; R35; 12	SYD; R36; 11			6th	2584
2016	Holden Racing Team	Holden VF Commodore	ADE; R1; 5	ADE; R2; 23	ADE; R3; 3	SYM; R4; 11	SYM; R5; 6	PHI; R6; 9	PHI; R7; 16	BAR; R8; 5	BAR; R9; 7	WIN; R10; 25	WIN; R11; 12	HID; R12; 23	HID; R13; 14	TOW; R14; 7	TOW; R15; 20	QLD; R16; 14	QLD; R17; 13	SMP; R18; 8	SMP; R19; 7	SAN; QR; 2	SAN; R20; 1	BAT; R21; Ret	SUR; R22; 15	SUR; R23; 11	PUK; R24; 5	PUK; R25; 10	PUK; R26; 10	PUK; R27; 7	SYD; R28; 2	SYD; R29; 2										9th	2252
2017	Garry Rogers Motorsport	Holden VF Commodore	ADE; R1; 12	ADE; R2; 11	SYM; R3; Ret	SYM; R4; 10	PHI; R5; 3	PHI; R6; 7	BAR; R7; 10	BAR; R8; 9	WIN; R9; 7	WIN; R10; 6	HID; R11; 26	HID; R12; 16	TOW; R13; 8	TOW; R14; 6	QLD; R15; 11	QLD; R16; 15	SMP; R17; 9	SMP; R18; 11	SAN; QR; 8	SAN; R19; 4	BAT; R20; 18	SUR; R21; 13	SUR; R22; 17	PUK; R23; 7	PUK; R24; 6	NEW; R25; 11	NEW; R26; 12													9th	2169
2018	Garry Rogers Motorsport	Holden ZB Commodore	ADE; R1; 16	ADE; R2; 3	MEL; R3; 8	MEL; R4; 18	MEL; R5; 26	MEL; R6; 9	SYM; R7; 13	SYM; R8; 7	PHI; R9; 11	PHI; R10; 10	BAR; R11; 19	BAR; R12; 14	WIN; R13; 8	WIN; R14; 22	HID; R15; 5	HID; R16; 7	TOW; R17; 21	TOW; R18; 19	QLD; R19; 11	QLD; R20; 11	SMP; R21; 20	BEN; R22; 28	BEN; R23; 20	SAN; QR; 15	SAN; R24; 9	BAT; R25; 6	SUR; R26; 9	SUR; R27; C	PUK; R28; 25	PUK; R29; 13	NEW; R30; 22	NEW; R31; 8								13th	2139
2019	Triple Eight Race Engineering	Holden ZB Commodore	ADE; R1	ADE; R2	MEL; R3	MEL; R4	MEL; R5	MEL; R6	SYM; R7; PO	SYM; R8; PO	PHI; R9	PHI; R10	BAR; R11	BAR; R12	WIN; R13; PO	WIN; R14; PO	HID; R15	HID; R16	TOW; R17	TOW; R18	QLD; R19	QLD; R20	BEN; R21; PO	BEN; R22; PO	PUK; R23	PUK; R24	BAT; R25; 2	SUR; R26; 2	SUR; R27; 1	SAN; QR; 3	SAN; R28; 17	NEW; R29	NEW; R30									27th	697
2020	Triple Eight Race Engineering	Holden ZB Commodore	ADE; R1	ADE; R2	MEL; R3	MEL; R4	MEL; R5	MEL; R6	SMP1; R7	SMP1; R8	SMP1; R9	SMP2; R10	SMP2; R11	SMP2; R12	HID1; R13	HID1; R14	HID1; R15	HID2; R16	HID2; R17	HID2; R18	TOW1; R19	TOW1; R20	TOW1; R21	TOW2; R22	TOW2; R23	TOW2; R24	BEN1; R25	BEN1; R26	BEN1; R27	BEN2; R28; PO	BEN2; R29; PO	BEN2; R30; PO	BAT; R31; 1									26th	300
2021	Triple Eight Race Engineering	Holden ZB Commodore	BAT1; R1	BAT1; R2	SAN; R3	SAN; R4	SAN; R5	SYM; R6	SYM; R7	SYM; R8	BEN; R9	BEN; R10	BEN; R11	HID; R12	HID; R13	HID; R14	TOW1; R15	TOW1; R16	TOW2; R17	TOW2; R18	TOW2; R19	SMP1; R20	SMP1; R21	SMP1; R22	SMP2; R23	SMP2; R24	SMP2; R25	SMP3; R26	SMP3; R27	SMP3; R28	SMP4; R29; PO	SMP4; R30; PO	BAT2; R31; 18									42nd	102
2022	Triple Eight Race Engineering	Holden ZB Commodore	SYD; R1	SYD; R2	SYM; R6	SYM; R7	SYM; R8	MEL; R6	MEL; R7	MEL; R8	MEL; R9	WAN; R10	WAN; R11	WAN; R12	WIN; R13	WIN; R14	WIN; R15	HID; R16	HID; R17	HID; R18	TOW; R19	TOW; R20	BEN; R21	BEN; R22	BEN; R23	SAN; R24; PO	SAN; R25; PO	SAN; R26; PO	PUK; R27	PUK; R28	PUK; R29	BAT; R30; 1	SUR; R31	SUR; R32	ADE; R33	ADE; R34						27th	300
2023	Grove Racing	Ford Mustang GT S650	NEW; R1	NEW; R2	MEL; R3	MEL; R4<	MEL; R5	MEL; R6	BAR; R7<	BAR; R8	BAR; R9	SYM; R10	SYM; R11	SYM; R12	HID; R13	HID; R14	HID; R15	TOW; R16	TOW; R17	SMP; R18	SMP; R19	BEN; R20	BEN; R21	BEN; R22	SAN; R23; Ret	BAT; R24; 5	SUR; R25	SUR; R26	ADE; R27	ADE; R28												41st	222
2024	Grove Racing	Ford Mustang GT S650	BAT1; R1	BAT1; R2	MEL; R3	MEL; R4	MEL; R5	MEL; R6	TAU; R7	TAU; R8	BAR; R9	BAR; R10	HID; R11	HID; R12	TOW; R13	TOW; R14	SMP; R15	SMP; R16	BEN; R17	BEN; R18	SAN; R19; 4	BAT; R20; Ret	SUR; R21	SUR; R22	ADE; R23	ADE; R24																42nd	240
2025	Grove Racing	Ford Mustang GT S650	SYD; R1	SYD; R2	SYD; R3	MEL; R4	MEL; R5	MEL; R6	MEL; R7	TAU; R8	TAU; R9	TAU; R10	SYM; R11	SYM; R12	SYM; R13	BAR; R14	BAR; R15	BAR; R16	HID; R17	HID; R18	HID; R19	TOW; R20	TOW; R21	TOW; R22	QLD; R23	QLD; R24	QLD; R25	BEN; R26; 3	BAT; R27; 1	SUR; R28	SUR; R29	SAN; R30	SAN; R31	ADE; R32	ADE; R33	ADE; R34						27th	554

=== Bathurst 1000 results ===
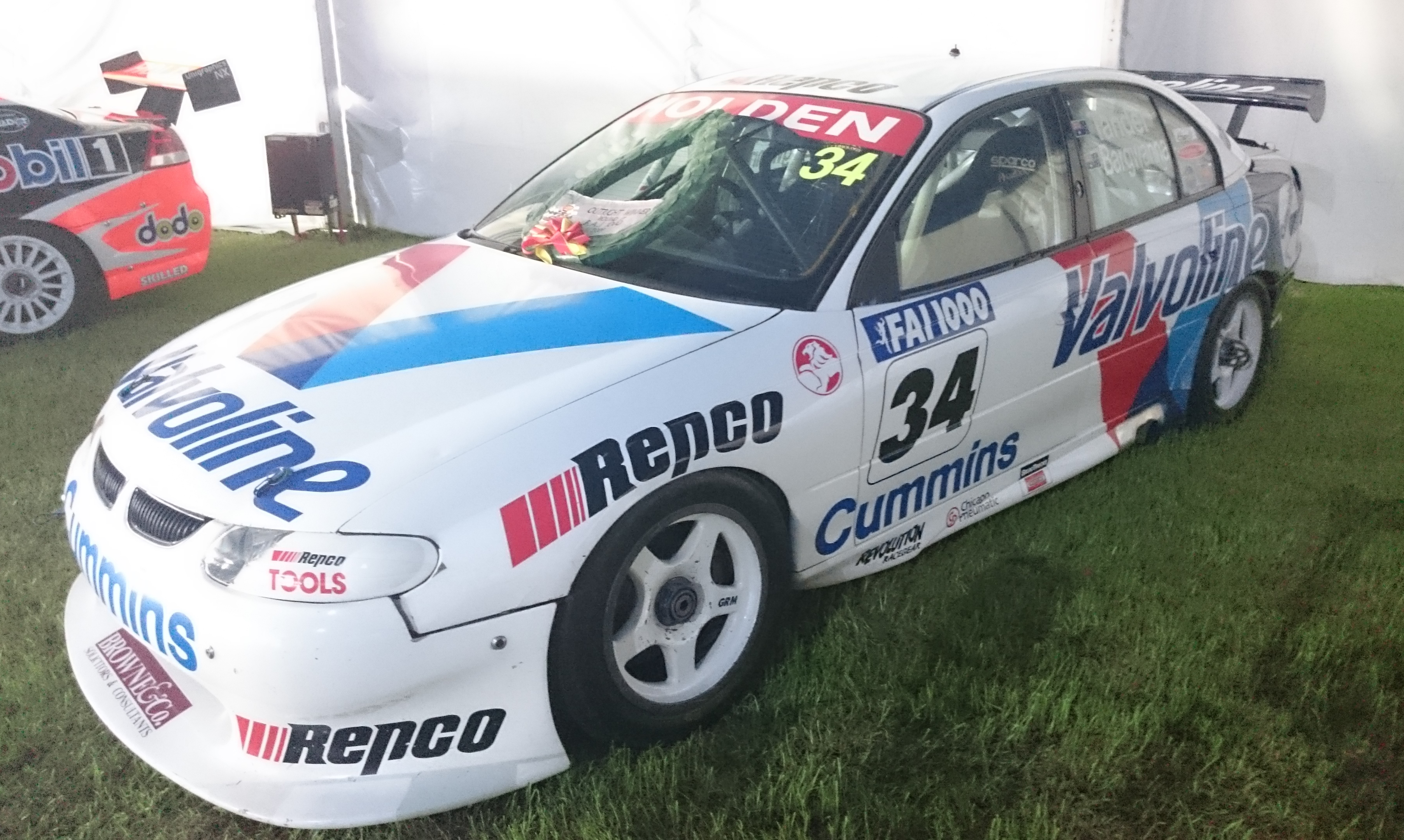
The Holden Commodore VT in which Tander and Jason Bargwanna won the 2000 FAI 1000 at Bathurst. The car is pictured in 2018

Year	Team	Car	Co-driver	Position	Laps
1998	Garry Rogers Motorsport	Holden Commodore VS	(Australia) Cameron McLean	DNF	49
1999	Garry Rogers Motorsport	Holden Commodore VT	(Australia) Jason Bargwanna	DNF	41
2000	Garry Rogers Motorsport	Holden Commodore VT	(Australia) Jason Bargwanna	1st	161
2001	Garry Rogers Motorsport	Holden Commodore VX	(Australia) Jason Bargwanna	6th	161
2002	Garry Rogers Motorsport	Holden Commodore VX	(Australia) Jason Bargwanna	DNF	51
2003	Garry Rogers Motorsport	Holden Commodore VY	(Australia) Jamie Whincup	19th	146
2004	Garry Rogers Motorsport	Holden Commodore VY	(Australia) Cameron McConville	DNF	133
2005	HSV Dealer Team	Holden Commodore VZ	(Australia) Rick Kelly	16th	149
2006	Holden Racing Team	Holden Commodore VZ	(Australia) Mark Skaife	DNF	0
2007	HSV Dealer Team	Holden Commodore VE	(Australia) Rick Kelly	DNF	134
2008	Holden Racing Team	Holden Commodore VE	(Australia) Mark Skaife	12th	160
2009	Holden Racing Team	Holden Commodore VE	(Australia) Will Davison	1st	161
2010	Holden Racing Team	Holden Commodore VE	(Australia) Cameron McConville	3rd	161
2011	Holden Racing Team	Holden Commodore VE	(Australia) Nick Percat	1st	161
2012	Holden Racing Team	Holden Commodore VE	(Australia) Nick Percat	25th	139
2013	Holden Racing Team	Holden Commodore VF	(Australia) Nick Percat	4th	161
2014	Holden Racing Team	Holden Commodore VF	(Australia) Warren Luff	DNS	0
2015	Holden Racing Team	Holden Commodore VF	(Australia) Warren Luff	3rd	161
2016	Holden Racing Team	Holden Commodore VF	(Australia) Warren Luff	DNF	150
2017	Garry Rogers Motorsport	Holden Commodore VF	(Australia) James Golding	18th	152
2018	Garry Rogers Motorsport	Holden Commodore ZB	(New Zealand) Chris Pither	6th	161
2019	Triple Eight Race Engineering	Holden Commodore ZB	(New Zealand) Shane van Gisbergen	2nd	161
2020	Triple Eight Race Engineering	Holden Commodore ZB	(New Zealand) Shane van Gisbergen	1st	161
2021	Triple Eight Race Engineering	Holden Commodore ZB	(New Zealand) Shane van Gisbergen	18th	161
2022	Triple Eight Race Engineering	Holden Commodore ZB	(New Zealand) Shane van Gisbergen	1st	161
2023	Grove Racing	Ford Mustang S650	(Australia) David Reynolds	5th	161
2024	Grove Racing	Ford Mustang S650	(New Zealand) Matthew Payne	DNF	130
2025	Grove Racing	Ford Mustang S650	(New Zealand) Matthew Payne	1st	161

=== Complete Bathurst 24 Hour results ===
Year	Team	Co-drivers	Car	Class	Laps	Pos.	Class pos.
2002	(Australia) Garry Rogers Motorsport	(New Zealand) Steven Richards (Australia) Nathan Pretty (Australia) Cameron McConville	Holden Monaro 427C	1	532	1st	1st
2003	(Australia) Garry Rogers Motorsport	(Australia) Nathan Pretty (New Zealand) Steven Richards (Australia) Cameron McConville	Holden Monaro 427C	A	527	2nd	2nd

=== Complete Bathurst 12 Hour results ===
Year	Team	Co-drivers	Car	Class	Laps	Pos.	Class pos.
2016	(Australia) Melbourne Performance Centre	(Australia) Steve McLaughlan (Germany) René Rast	Audi R8 LMS	AP	293	8th	7th
2017	(Australia) Melbourne Performance Centre	(Germany) Christopher Mies (Germany) Christopher Haase	Audi R8 LMS	Class A – GT3 Pro	282	13th	6th
2018	(Australia) Jamec Pem Racing	(South Africa) Kelvin van der Linde (Belgium) Frédéric Vervisch	Audi R8 LMS	APP	241	27th	7th
2019	(Australia) Audi Sport Team Valvoline	(South Africa) Kelvin van der Linde (Belgium) Frédéric Vervisch	Audi R8 LMS	APP	181	DNF	DNF
2020	(Australia) Audi Sport Team Valvoline	(Italy) Mirko Bortolotti (Germany) Christopher Mies	Audi R8 LMS Evo	GT3 Pro	61	DNF	DNF

=== TCR Australia results ===
TCR Australia results
Year	Team	Car	1	2	3	4	5	6	7	8	9	10	11	12	13	14	15	16	17	18	19	20	21	Position	Points
2019	Melbourne Performance Centre	Audi RS 3 LMS TCR	SMP; R1	SMP; R2	SMP; R3	PHI; R4; 10	PHI; R5; Ret	PHI; R6; 4	BEN; R7; 1	BEN; R8; 2	BEN; R9; 2	QLD; R10	QLD; R11	QLD; R12	WIN; R13	WIN; R14	WIN; R15	SAN; R16; 4	SAN; R17; 2	SAN; R18; 2	BEN; R19	BEN; R20	BEN; R21	10th	286
2021	Melbourne Performance Centre	Audi RS 3 LMS TCR	SYM; R1	SYM; R2	SYM; R3	PHI; R4	PHI; R5	PHI; R6	BAT; R7; 3	BAT; R8; 3	BAT; R9; 4	SMP; R10	SMP; R11	SMP; R12	BAT; R19	BAT; R20	BAT; R21							20th	110

Sporting positions
Preceded by Steven Richards; Greg Murphy	Winner of the Bathurst 1000; 2000; With: Jason Bargwanna	Succeeded by Mark Skaife; Tony Longhurst
Preceded by Craig Lowndes	Winner of the Clipsal 500; 2000	Succeeded by Jason Bright
Preceded by Rick Kelly	Winner of the V8 Supercar Championship Series; 2007	Succeeded by Jamie Whincup
Preceded by Craig Lowndes; Jamie Whincup	Winner of the Bathurst 1000; 2009; With: Will Davison	Succeeded by Craig Lowndes; Mark Skaife
Preceded by Jamie Whincup	Winner of the Clipsal 500; 2010	Succeeded by Jamie Whincup
Preceded by Craig Lowndes; Mark Skaife	Winner of the Bathurst 1000; 2011; With: Nick Percat	Succeeded by Jamie Whincup; Paul Dumbrell
Preceded by Jamie Whincup; Paul Dumbrell	Winner of the Pirtek Endurance Cup; 2015 (with Warren Luff)	Succeeded by Shane van Gisbergen; Alexandre Prémat
Preceded by Mark Winterbottom; Steve Owen	Winner of the Sandown 500; 2016 (with Warren Luff)	Succeeded by Cameron Waters; Richie Stanaway
Preceded by Scott McLaughlin; Alexandre Prémat	Winner of the Bathurst 1000; 2020; With: Shane van Gisbergen	Succeeded by Chaz Mostert; Lee Holdsworth
Preceded by Chaz Mostert; Lee Holdsworth	Winner of the Bathurst 1000; 2022; With: Shane van Gisbergen	Succeeded by Shane van Gisbergen; Richie Stanaway
Preceded by Brodie Kostecki; Todd Hazelwood	Winner of the Bathurst 1000; 2025; With: Matthew Payne	Succeeded by Incumbent
Preceded by Jamie Whincup; Craig Lowndes	Winner of the Supercars Endurance Cup; 2025 (with Matthew Payne)	Succeeded by Incumbent
