= Auckland SuperSprint =

(New Zealand) Auckland SuperSprint
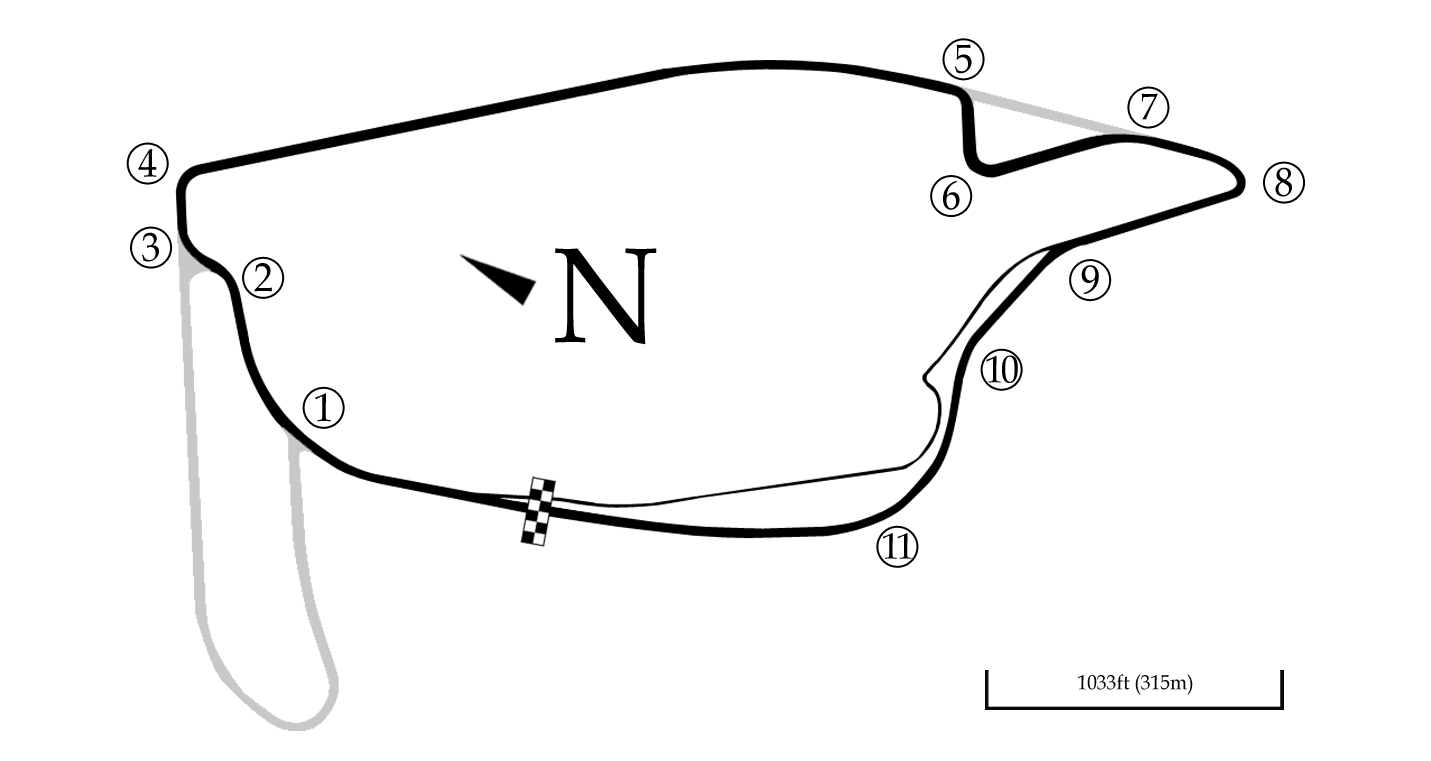
- Race Information
Venue	Pukekohe Park Raceway
Number of times held	15
First held	1996
Last held	2022
- Race Format
- Race 1
Laps	41
Distance	120 km
- Race 2
Laps	41
Distance	120 km
- Race 3
Laps	41
Distance	120 km
- Last Event (2022)
- Overall Winner
(New Zealand) Shane van Gisbergen	Triple Eight Race Engineering
- Race Winners
(Australia) Will Davison	Dick Johnson Racing
(New Zealand) Shane van Gisbergen	Triple Eight Race Engineering
(New Zealand) Shane van Gisbergen	Triple Eight Race Engineering

The Auckland SuperSprint was an annual motor racing event for Supercars, held at Pukekohe Park Raceway in Pukekohe, New Zealand. The event was a regular part of the Supercars Championship—and its previous incarnations, the Shell Championship Series and V8 Supercars Championship—since 2001.

The event was not held in 2020 and 2021 due to the COVID-19 pandemic. Supercars returned to New Zealand and the Pukekoke Park Raceway circuit on September 10–11 for Round 10 of the 2022 season.

== Format ==
The event was staged over a three-day weekend, from Friday to Sunday. Two thirty-minute practice sessions were held, one on Friday and one on Saturday. Saturday featured a three-part qualifying session which decides the grid positions for the following 120 kilometre race. Two separated ten-minute qualifying sessions were held on Sunday, which decided the grid for the following 120 km races.

=== Jason Richards Memorial Trophy ===
Since 2013, the driver who scored the most points across all races during the weekend has received the Jason Richards Memorial Trophy. The trophy was introduced at the 2013 event in honour of Jason Richards, a one-time New Zealand Supercars race winner and Supercars Hall of Fame member who died of cancer in 2011.

== History ==
=== Background ===
Pukehohe Park was one of New Zealand's most historic race tracks, and has long seen links with Australian motor racing. This dates back to the famed Pukekohe 500, which originally ran from 1984 to 1993 for touring cars and dates back to 1963 for production cars. Several Australian teams, along with local and international teams, competed in the endurance Group A event with Australian-based teams winning the event several times. The event was often twinned with the Wellington 500, on a street circuit in Wellington City. In 1996, twelve cars from the Australian Touring Car Championship raced in the Mobil 1 Sprints, a two event series at Pukekohe and Wellington. In a precursor to his later Supercars success at the track, all three races were won by local driver Greg Murphy for the Holden Racing Team.

=== Championship era ===
The first championship round at Pukekohe Park for what was then known as V8 Supercars was held in 2001, entitled the Boost Mobile V8 International. It was the first round in the history of the Australian Touring Car Championship and Supercars not to be contested in Australia. Mark Skaife sealed the 2001 Shell Championship Series in the first race, while Greg Murphy won the event, taking pole position and winning all three races for the Kmart Racing Team. Murphy maintained strong form at Pukekohe, winning again in 2002, 2003 and 2005. The 2002 event contained the 500th race in championship history, which was won by Skaife. Jason Bright was the only other driver to win the event in the first five years, doing so in 2004, while Murphy finished third. In 2005 there was a major accident involving Craig Baird and Paul Dumbrell during the third race. Jamie Whincup slid off the track at the final corner and Baird and Dumbrell squeezed together as Whincup returned to the circuit. However, Baird and Dumbrell came together and spun, both hitting the wall before coming to rest on opposite sides of the track with severely damaged cars. The race was red flagged as a result.

=== Hiatus ===
The New Zealand event moved to the Hamilton Street Circuit for 2008 and remained there until 2012.

=== Return ===
Supercars returned to a slightly modified Pukekohe layout in 2013 and the Jason Richards Memorial Trophy was introduced. Jason Bright and Brad Jones Racing, Richards' last teammate and team respectively, were the first winners of the trophy. In 2014, Ford's Mark Winterbottom was the event winner, marking the first win at the event for Ford in its ninth running. The event was run over the Anzac Day long weekend, including a race on a Friday for the first time in championship history. In 2015 and 2017, Jamie Whincup, who was a teammate of Jason Richards in 2005 at Tasman Motorsport and co-drove with him to a second-place finish at the 2005 Bathurst 1000, won the trophy. In 2016, Shane van Gisbergen became the first New Zealand driver to win the trophy. In 2018, championship combatants van Gisbergen and Scott McLaughlin each took a first and second in the two races, with McLaughlin winning the event on a countback due to his higher Sunday result. The same two drivers won races in the 2019 event, which moved to a September date, with van Gisbergen this time winning the trophy. In winning the Sunday race, which included a controversial safety car that shuffled the field, McLaughlin surpassed Craig Lowndes' 1996 record of 16 wins in a season.

=== 2020 move and cancellation ===
As in 2013, the 2020 Pukekohe event was scheduled on the Anzac Day weekend. It was later discovered that an amendment to Auckland Council's Unitary Plan in the intermediary period prohibited racing on the public holiday. As such the event was to be moved to the nearby Hampton Downs Motorsport Park, and was to continue to be known as the Auckland Super400 despite being located in the neighbouring Waikato region. The event was later postponed, rescheduled to January 2021 (within the prolonged 2020 championship) and then cancelled altogether - all due to the COVID-19 pandemic. The 2021 event was similarly cancelled due to the border issues arising from the pandemic.

=== Venue change ===
On 20 July 2022 it was confirmed that Pukekohe Park Raceway will cease motorsport activities from 2 April 2023.

== Winners ==
Events which were not championship rounds are indicated by a pink background.

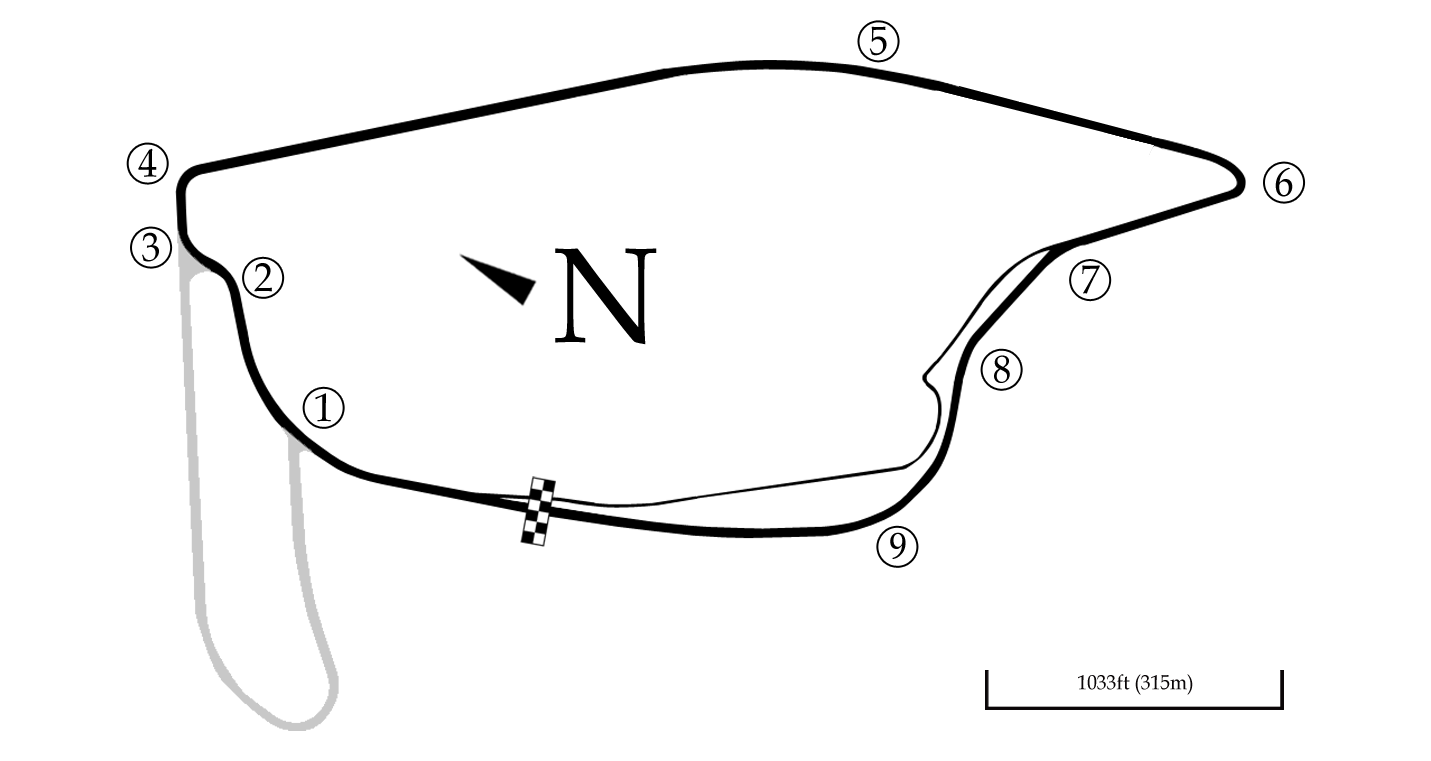
The Pukekohe layout used until 2007

Year	Driver	Team	Car	Report
1996	(New Zealand) Greg Murphy	Holden Racing Team	Holden Commodore (VR)	Report
1997 – 2000	not held			
2001	(New Zealand) Greg Murphy	Tom Walkinshaw Racing Australia	Holden Commodore (VX)	Report
2002	(New Zealand) Greg Murphy	Tom Walkinshaw Racing Australia	Holden Commodore (VX)	Report
2003	(New Zealand) Greg Murphy	John Kelly Racing	Holden Commodore (VY)	Report
2004	(Australia) Jason Bright	Paul Weel Racing	Holden Commodore (VY)	Report
2005	(New Zealand) Greg Murphy	Paul Weel Racing	Holden Commodore (VZ)	Report
2006	(Australia) Mark Skaife	Holden Racing Team	Holden Commodore (VZ)	Report
2007	(Australia) Rick Kelly	HSV Dealer Team	Holden Commodore (VE)	Report
2008 – 2012	not held			
2013	(Australia) Jason Bright	Brad Jones Racing	Holden Commodore (VF)	Report
2014	(Australia) Mark Winterbottom	Ford Performance Racing	Ford Falcon (FG)	Report
2015	(Australia) Jamie Whincup	Triple Eight Race Engineering	Holden Commodore (VF)	Report
2016	(New Zealand) Shane van Gisbergen	Triple Eight Race Engineering	Holden Commodore (VF)	Report
2017	(Australia) Jamie Whincup	Triple Eight Race Engineering	Holden Commodore (VF)	Report
2018	(New Zealand) Scott McLaughlin	DJR Team Penske	Ford Falcon (FG X)	Report
2019	(New Zealand) Shane van Gisbergen	Triple Eight Race Engineering	Holden Commodore (ZB)	Report
2020 – 2021	not held due to COVID-19 pandemic			
2022	(New Zealand) Shane van Gisbergen	Triple Eight Race Engineering	Holden Commodore (ZB)	Report

== Multiple winners ==
=== By driver ===
Wins which did not count towards the championship season are indicated by a pink background.

Wins	Driver	Years
5	(New Zealand) Greg Murphy	1996, 2001, 2002, 2003, 2005
3	(New Zealand) Shane van Gisbergen	2016, 2019, 2022
2	(Australia) Jason Bright	2004, 2013
2	(Australia) Jamie Whincup	2015, 2017

=== By team ===
Wins	Team
5	Triple Eight Race Engineering
4	HSV Dealer Team^{1}
2	Holden Racing Team
2	Paul Weel Racing

=== By manufacturer ===
Wins	Manufacturer
14	Holden
2	Ford

Notes

- ^1 – The HSV Dealer Team was known as Kmart Racing Team from 2001 to 2004, hence their statistics are combined.

== Event names and sponsors ==
- 1996: Mobil 1 Sprints
- 2001–02: Boost Mobile V8 International
- 2003–05: PlaceMakers V8 International
- 2006–07: PlaceMakers V8 Supercars
- 2013: ITM 400 Auckland
- 2014–15: ITM 500 Auckland
- 2016–19, 2022: ITM Auckland SuperSprint

== See also ==
- Hamilton 400
- Pukekohe 500
- Wellington 500
- List of Australian Touring Car Championship races
