= 2006 V8 Supercar Championship Series =

Motor racing competition

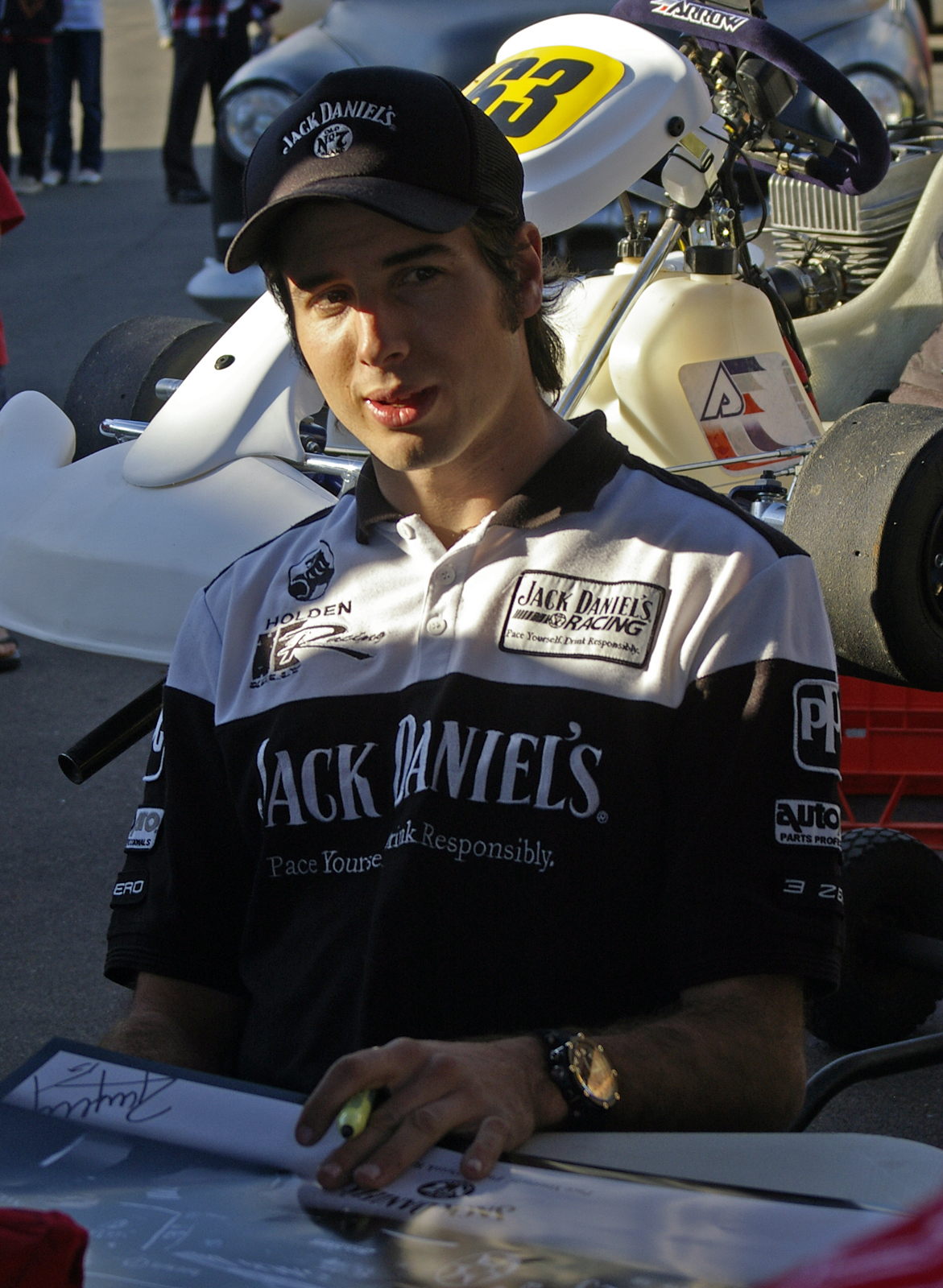
Rick Kelly won the championship driving for the HSV Dealer Team.

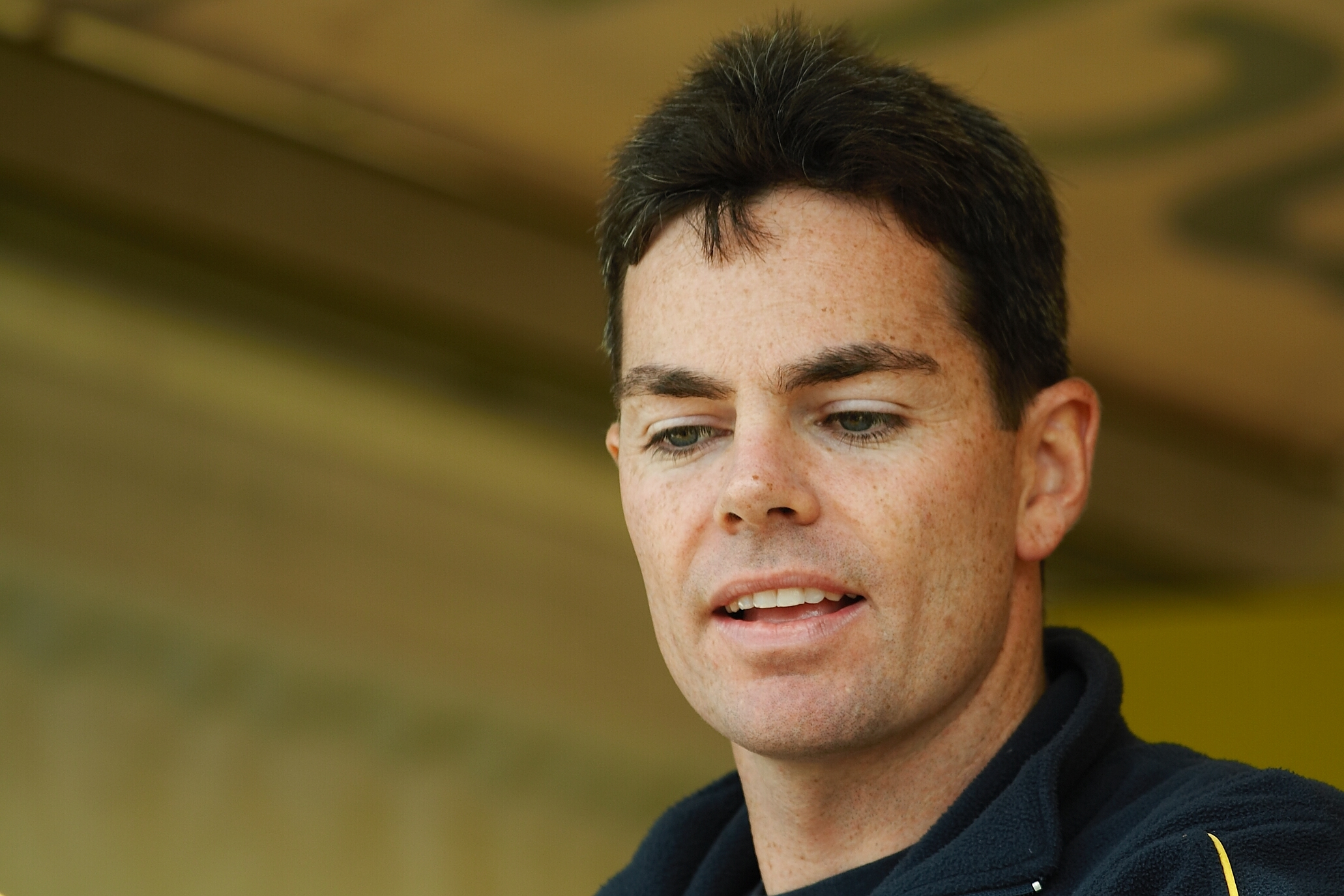
Craig Lowndes placed second in the championship

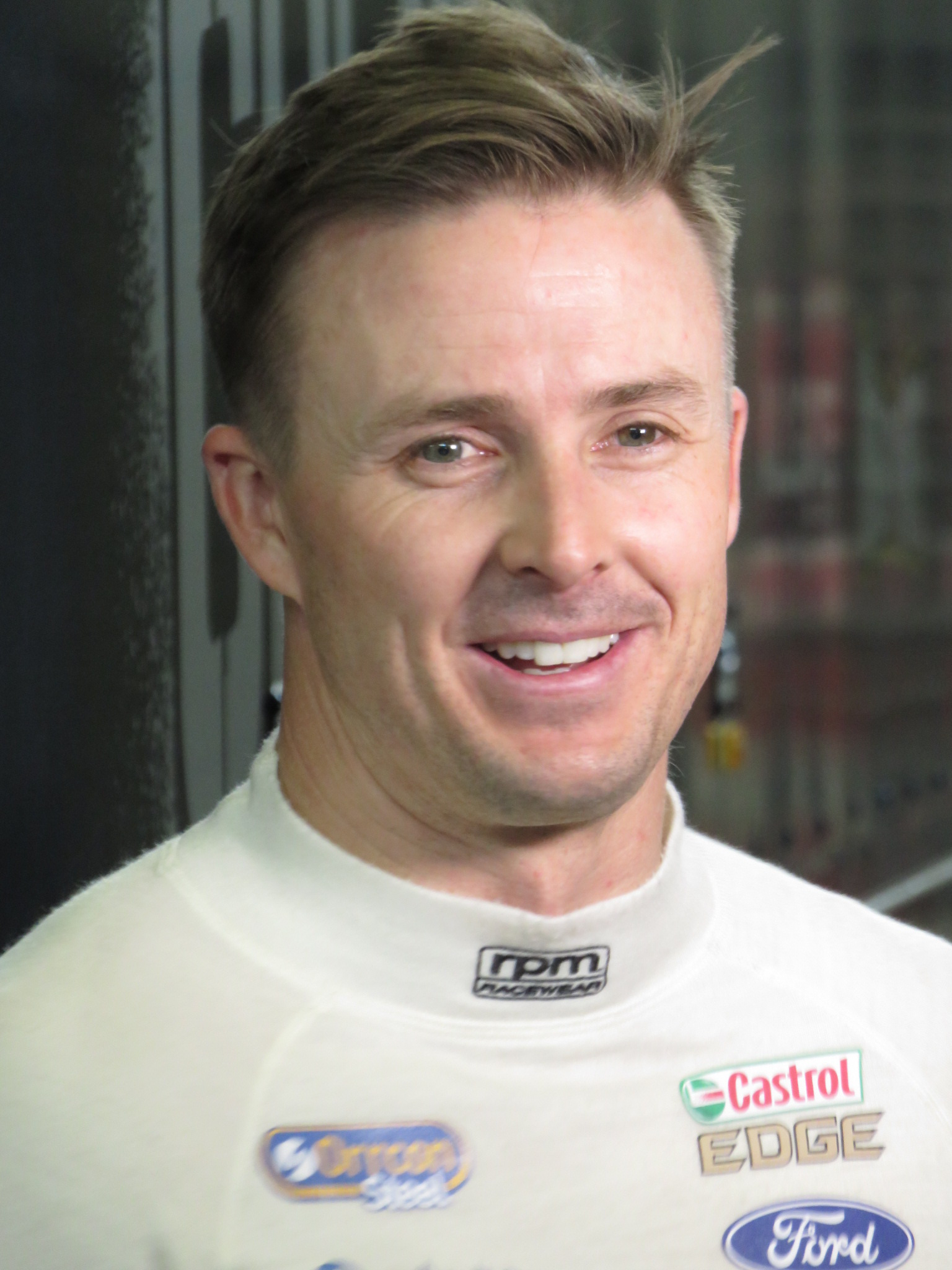
Mark Winterbottom, finished third in the championship for Ford Performance Racing.

The 2006 V8 Supercar Championship Series was an Australian based motor racing competition for V8 Supercars. It began on 25 March 2006 in Adelaide and ended on 10 December 2006 at Phillip Island after 13 rounds. The 2006 Championship was the eighth V8 Supercar Championship Series.

The Drivers Championship was won by Rick Kelly, the Teams Championship by the Toll HSV Dealer Team and the Manufacturers Championship by Ford. As the winner of the Drivers Championship, Kelly was also awarded the 47th Australian Touring Car Championship title by the Confederation of Australian Motor Sport. The drivers' championship was decided in controversial circumstances – Kelly and Craig Lowndes collided in the final race having started the race level on points at the top of the table.

== Teams and drivers ==
The following teams and drivers competed in the 2006 championship.

Manufacturer	Model	Team	No.	Driver name	Rounds	Co-driver name
Ford	Falcon BA	Stone Brothers Racing	1	(Australia) Russell Ingall	All	(Australia) Luke Youlden
Ford	Falcon BA	Stone Brothers Racing	4	(Australia) James Courtney	All	(Australia) Glenn Seton
Ford	Falcon BA	Ford Performance Racing	5	(Australia) Mark Winterbottom	All	(New Zealand) Matthew Halliday (Australia) Cameron McLean* (Australia) David Brabham**
Ford	Falcon BA	Ford Performance Racing	6	(Australia) Jason Bright	All	(New Zealand) Matthew Halliday (Australia) Cameron McLean* (Australia) David Brabham**
Ford	Falcon BA	WPS Racing	8	(Brazil) Max Wilson	All	(Australia) David Besnard
Ford	Falcon BA	WPS Racing	10	(Australia) Jason Bargwanna	All	(New Zealand) Craig Baird
Ford	Falcon BA	Brad Jones Racing	12	(Australia) John Bowe	All	(Australia) Dale Brede (New Zealand) Mark Porter* (Australia) Michael Caruso**
Ford	Falcon BA	Brad Jones Racing	14	(Australia) Brad Jones	All	(Australia) Dale Brede (New Zealand) Mark Porter* (Australia) Michael Caruso**
Ford	Falcon BA	Dick Johnson Racing	17	(Australia) Steven Johnson	All	(Australia) Alex Davison (Australia) Grant Denyer
Ford	Falcon BA	Dick Johnson Racing	18	(Australia) Will Davison	All	(Australia) Alex Davison (Australia) Grant Denyer
Ford	Falcon BA	Paul Cruickshank Racing	20	(Australia) Marcus Marshall	All	(Australia) Jonathon Webb
Ford	Falcon BA	A.N.T. Racing (Note: Leased the Team Kiwi Racing entry at final round after Team Kiwi's only Commodore was destroyed at Bathurst)	021	(Australia) Tony Evangelou	13	—N/a
Ford	Falcon BA	Britek Motorsport	25	(Australia) Warren Luff	All	(Australia) Adam Macrow
Ford	Falcon BA	Britek Motorsport	26	(Australia) José Fernández	1, 4, 6–10, 12–13	(Australia) Tony Ricciardello
Ford	Falcon BA	Britek Motorsport	26	(Australia) Tony Ricciardello	3, 5, 11	—N/a
Ford	Falcon BA	Triple Eight Race Engineering	88	(Australia) Jamie Whincup	All	(Denmark) Allan Simonsen (United Kingdom) Richard Lyons
Ford	Falcon BA	Triple Eight Race Engineering	888	(Australia) Craig Lowndes	All	(Denmark) Allan Simonsen (United Kingdom) Richard Lyons
Holden	Commodore VZ	Holden Racing Team	2	(Australia) Mark Skaife	All	(Australia) Garth Tander
Holden	Commodore VZ	Holden Racing Team	22	(Australia) Todd Kelly	1–7, 10–13	(New Zealand) Jim Richards
Holden	Commodore VZ	Holden Racing Team	22	(Australia) Ryan Briscoe	8–9	(New Zealand) Jim Richards
Holden	Commodore VZ	Tasman Motorsport	3	(New Zealand) Jason Richards	All	(Australia) Mark Noske (Australia) Owen Kelly
Holden	Commodore VZ	Tasman Motorsport	23	(Australia) Andrew Jones	All	(Australia) Mark Noske (Australia) Owen Kelly
Holden	Commodore VZ	Perkins Engineering	7	(New Zealand) Steven Richards	All	(Australia) Shane Price (Australia) Jack Perkins
Holden	Commodore VZ	Perkins Engineering	11	(Australia) Paul Dumbrell	All	(Australia) Shane Price (Australia) Jack Perkins
Holden	Commodore VZ	HSV Dealer Team (HRT)	15	(Australia) Rick Kelly	All	(Australia) Todd Kelly
Holden	Commodore VZ	HSV Dealer Team (HRT)	16	(Australia) Garth Tander	1–7, 10–13	(Australia) Anthony Tratt
Holden	Commodore VZ	HSV Dealer Team (HRT)	16	(Australia) Tony D'Alberto	8–9	(Australia) Anthony Tratt
Holden	Commodore VZ	Team Kiwi Racing	021	(New Zealand) Paul Radisich	1–9	(New Zealand) Fabian Coulthard
Holden	Commodore VZ	Team Kiwi Racing	021	(New Zealand) Craig Baird	11	—N/a
Holden	Commodore VZ	Team Kiwi Racing	021	(New Zealand) Chris Pither	12	—N/a
Holden	Commodore VZ	MSport (Note: Leased one of the Britek Motorsport entries at the Pukekohe round)	26	(New Zealand) Mark Porter	2	—N/a
Holden	Commodore VZ	Garry Rogers Motorsport	33	(Australia) Lee Holdsworth	All	(Australia) Greg Ritter (Australia) Phillip Scifleet* (Australia) Cameron McLean**
Holden	Commodore VZ	Garry Rogers Motorsport	34	(Australia) Dean Canto	All	(Australia) Greg Ritter (Australia) Phillip Scifleet* (Australia) Cameron McLean**
Holden	Commodore VZ	Paul Morris Motorsport	39	(Australia) Alan Gurr	1, 3, 8–10	(New Zealand) Kayne Scott
Holden	Commodore VZ	Paul Morris Motorsport	39	(New Zealand) Fabian Coulthard	2, 4, 7	—N/a
Holden	Commodore VZ	Paul Morris Motorsport	39	(Australia) Steven Ellery	5–6	—N/a
Holden	Commodore VZ	Paul Morris Motorsport	39	(Australia) Shane Price	11, 13	—N/a
Holden	Commodore VZ	Paul Morris Motorsport	39	(Australia) Jack Perkins	12	—N/a
Holden	Commodore VZ	Paul Morris Motorsport	67	(Australia) Paul Morris	All	(Australia) Steven Ellery
Holden	Commodore VZ	Paul Weel Racing	50	(Australia) Cameron McConville	All	(Australia) Nathan Pretty (Australia) Paul Weel
Holden	Commodore VZ	Paul Weel Racing	51	(New Zealand) Greg Murphy	All	(Australia) Nathan Pretty (Australia) Paul Weel
Holden	Commodore VZ	Rod Nash Racing	55	(Australia) Steve Owen	All	(Australia) Tony Longhurst

* = Drove in Sandown 500 only ** = Drove in Bathurst 1000 only

== Race calendar ==
The 2006 V8 Supercar Championship Series was contested over 13 rounds. The Betta Electrical 500 and the Supercheap Auto Bathurst 1000 were endurance events which were contested over a single race with two drivers per car. The round at Winton Motor Raceway was organised as a late replacement for the cancelled V8 Supercars China Round.

Rd.	Race title	Circuit	Location	Date
1	(South Australia) Clipsal 500 Adelaide	Adelaide Street Circuit	Adelaide, South Australia	23–26 March
2	(New Zealand) PlaceMakers V8 International	Pukekohe Park Raceway	Pukekohe, New Zealand	21–23 April
3	(Western Australia) Perth V8 400	Barbagallo Raceway	Wanneroo, Western Australia	12–14 May
4	(Victoria (state)) Winton	Winton Motor Raceway	Benalla, Victoria	2–4 June
5	(Northern Territory) Skycity Triple Crown	Hidden Valley Raceway	Darwin, Northern Territory	30 June – 2 July
6	(Queensland) BigPond 400	Queensland Raceway	Ipswich, Queensland	21–23 July
7	(New South Wales) Oran Park	Oran Park Raceway	Sydney, New South Wales	11–13 August
8	(Victoria (state)) Betta Electrical 500	Sandown Raceway	Melbourne, Victoria	1–3 September
9	(New South Wales) Supercheap Auto Bathurst 1000	Mount Panorama	Bathurst, New South Wales	5–8 October
10	(Queensland) Gillette V8 Supercar Challenge	Surfers Paradise Street Circuit	Surfers Paradise, Queensland	19–22 October
11	Ferodo Tasmania Challenge	Symmons Plains Raceway	Launceston, Tasmania	10–12 November
12	(Bahrain) Desert 400	Bahrain International Circuit	Manama, Bahrain	23–25 November
13	(Victoria (state)) Caterpillar Grand Finale	Phillip Island	Phillip Island, Victoria	8–10 December

Australian rounds
New Zealand rounds
Bahrain rounds

== Results and standings ==
=== Season summary ===
Round	Race	Event	Pole position	Race winners	Round winner	Report
1	R1	Adelaide	(Australia) Mark Skaife	(Australia) Craig Lowndes	(Australia) Jamie Whincup (Triple Eight Race Engineering, Ford)	report
1	R2	Adelaide		(Australia) Jamie Whincup	(Australia) Jamie Whincup (Triple Eight Race Engineering, Ford)	report
2	R1	Pukekohe	(Australia) Garth Tander	(Australia) Mark Skaife	(Australia) Mark Skaife (Holden Racing Team, Holden)	report
2	R2	Pukekohe		(Australia) Garth Tander	(Australia) Mark Skaife (Holden Racing Team, Holden)	report
2	R3	Pukekohe		(Australia) Mark Skaife	(Australia) Mark Skaife (Holden Racing Team, Holden)	report
3	R1	Perth	(Australia) Mark Skaife	(Australia) Mark Skaife	(New Zealand) Steven Richards (Perkins Engineering, Holden)	report
3	R2	Perth		(Australia) Dean Canto	(New Zealand) Steven Richards (Perkins Engineering, Holden)	report
3	R3	Perth		(Australia) Mark Skaife	(New Zealand) Steven Richards (Perkins Engineering, Holden)	report
4	R1	Winton	(Australia) Jason Bright	(Australia) Jason Bright	(Australia) Craig Lowndes (Triple Eight Race Engineering, Ford)	report
4	R2	Winton		(New Zealand) Jason Richards	(Australia) Craig Lowndes (Triple Eight Race Engineering, Ford)	report
4	R3	Winton		(Australia) Craig Lowndes	(Australia) Craig Lowndes (Triple Eight Race Engineering, Ford)	report
5	R1	Darwin	(Australia) Jason Bright	(Australia) Mark Skaife	(Australia) Craig Lowndes (Triple Eight Race Engineering, Ford)	report
5	R2	Darwin		(Australia) Jason Bright	(Australia) Craig Lowndes (Triple Eight Race Engineering, Ford)	report
5	R3	Darwin		(Australia) Craig Lowndes	(Australia) Craig Lowndes (Triple Eight Race Engineering, Ford)	report
6	R1	Ipswich	(Australia) Garth Tander	(Australia) Garth Tander	(Australia) Garth Tander (HSV Dealer Team, Holden)	report
6	R2	Ipswich		(Australia) Mark Skaife	(Australia) Garth Tander (HSV Dealer Team, Holden)	report
6	R3	Ipswich		(Australia) Garth Tander	(Australia) Garth Tander (HSV Dealer Team, Holden)	report
7	R1	Oran Park	(Australia) Jason Bright	(Australia) Todd Kelly	(Australia) Craig Lowndes (Triple Eight Race Engineering, Ford)	report
7	R2	Oran Park		(Australia) Mark Skaife	(Australia) Craig Lowndes (Triple Eight Race Engineering, Ford)	report
7	R3	Oran Park		(Australia) Craig Lowndes	(Australia) Craig Lowndes (Triple Eight Race Engineering, Ford)	report
8		Sandown	(Australia) Garth Tander	(Australia) Jason Bright (Australia) Mark Winterbottom (Ford Performance Racing, Ford)		report
9		Bathurst	(Australia) Mark Skaife	(Australia) Craig Lowndes (Australia) Jamie Whincup (Triple Eight Race Engineering, Ford)		report
10	R1	Gold Coast	(Australia) Todd Kelly	(Australia) Todd Kelly	(Australia) Todd Kelly (Holden Racing Team, Holden)	report
10	R2	Gold Coast		(Australia) Garth Tander	(Australia) Todd Kelly (Holden Racing Team, Holden)	report
10	R3	Gold Coast		(Australia) Rick Kelly	(Australia) Todd Kelly (Holden Racing Team, Holden)	report
11	R1	Launceston	(Australia) Mark Skaife	(Australia) Jason Bright	(Australia) Garth Tander (HSV Dealer Team, Holden)	report
11	R2	Launceston		(Australia) Garth Tander	(Australia) Garth Tander (HSV Dealer Team, Holden)	report
11	R3	Launceston		(Australia) Garth Tander	(Australia) Garth Tander (HSV Dealer Team, Holden)	report
12	R1	Bahrain	(Australia) Garth Tander	(Australia) Jason Bright	(Australia) Jason Bright (Ford Performance Racing, Ford)	report
12	R2	Bahrain		(Australia) Garth Tander	(Australia) Jason Bright (Ford Performance Racing, Ford)	report
12	R3	Bahrain		(Australia) Todd Kelly	(Australia) Jason Bright (Ford Performance Racing, Ford)	report
13	R1	Phillip Island	(Australia) Todd Kelly	(Australia) Todd Kelly	(Australia) Todd Kelly (Holden Racing Team, Holden)	report
13	R2	Phillip Island		(Australia) Todd Kelly	(Australia) Todd Kelly (Holden Racing Team, Holden)	report
13	R3	Phillip Island		(Australia) Mark Winterbottom	(Australia) Todd Kelly (Holden Racing Team, Holden)	report

=== Points system ===
Championship points were awarded on the following basis:

Points format	Position																															
Points format	1st	2nd	3rd	4th	5th	6th	7th	8th	9th	10th	11th	12th	13th	14th	15th	16th	17th	18th	19th	20th	21st	22nd	23rd	24th	25th	26th	27th	28th	29th	30th	31st	32nd
First 3-race format, normal race	128	124	120	116	112	108	104	100	96	92	88	84	80	76	72	68	64	60	56	52	48	44	40	36	32	28	24	20	16	12	8	4
First 3-race format, reverse grid	64	62	60	58	56	54	52	50	48	46	44	42	40	38	36	34	32	30	28	26	24	22	20	18	16	14	12	10	8	6	4	2
Second 3-race format	107	103	100	97	93	90	87	83	80	77	73	70	67	63	60	57	53	50	47	43	40	37	33	30	27	23	20	17	13	10	7	3
2-race format	160	155	150	145	140	135	130	125	120	115	110	105	100	95	90	85	80	75	70	65	60	55	50	45	40	35	30	25	20	15	10	5
Endurance format	320	310	300	290	280	270	260	250	240	230	220	210	200	190	180	170	160	150	140	130	120	110	100	90	80	70	60	50	40	30	20	10

- First 3-race format, normal race: Used for races 1 and 3 for Pukekohe through Oran Park.
- First 3-race format, reverse grid: Used for race 2 for Pukekohe through Oran Park.
- Second 3-race format: Used for all races from the Surfers Paradise round onward.
- 2-race format: Used for the Clipsal 500 Adelaide.
- Endurance format: Used for the Sandown 500 and Bathurst 1000.

Drivers were required to drop the points from their worst round up to and including Bathurst.

=== Drivers championship ===
Pos.	Driver	No.	ADE (South Australia)		PUK (New Zealand)			BAR (Western Australia)			WIN (Victoria (state))			HID (Northern Territory)			QLD (Queensland)			ORA (New South Wales)			SAN (Victoria (state))	BAT (New South Wales)	SUR (Queensland)			SYM (Tasmania)			BAH (Bahrain)			PHI (Victoria (state))			Pts.
1	(Australia) Rick Kelly	15	2	3	12	10	7	7	11	14	10	4	4	2	10	5	7	4	2	3	13	2	2	2	6	4	1	3	5	4	4	28	5	5	4	18	3308
2	(Australia) Craig Lowndes	888	1	Ret	5	17	2	3	14	2	2	8	1	4	3	1	4	5	4	2	2	1	3	1	11	7	14	27	9	7	9	5	3	4	3	29	3271
3	(Australia) Mark Winterbottom	5	22	19	4	3	3	6	13	3	8	12	6	3	17	8	9	7	9	7	15	11	1	Ret	3	3	3	2	2	3	8	3	27	7	2	1	3089
4	(Australia) Garth Tander	16	8	4	20	1	4	4	10	5	6	10	5	5	8	3	1	2	1	Ret	21	5	26	Ret	2	1	19	4	1	1	2	1	8	2	18	2	2965
5	(Australia) Jason Bright	6	25	15	3	20	20	5	Ret	28	1	20	2	24	1	4	2	8	3	4	18	Ret	1	Ret	7	6	4	1	3	2	1	2	2	10	8	4	2868
6	(Australia) Todd Kelly	22	6	2	Ret	13	25	30	28	4	4	25	24	12	27	22	Ret	21	18	1	10	Ret	2	2	1	2	2	7	4	5	3	4	1	1	1	5	2815
7	(New Zealand) Steven Richards	7	7	5	7	Ret	6	2	2	7	7	23	10	7	22	28	6	14	6	8	11	Ret	28	5	5	Ret	10	6	11	6	6	8	11	8	5	8	2740
8	(Australia) Russell Ingall	1	9	7	2	6	5	10	8	6	12	5	25	10	7	9	5	9	5	12	5	21	27	4	8	8	5	14	10	10	13	21	10	14	26	30	2708
9	(Australia) Steven Johnson	17	10	9	9	9	9	9	17	10	11	Ret	14	29	2	15	14	23	25	10	4	4	4	Ret	10	10	9	13	16	Ret	27	11	6	19	15	22	2378
10	(Australia) Jamie Whincup	88	3	1	15	Ret	10	21	4	9	25	2	9	9	5	26	8	27	8	5	6	Ret	3	1	Ret	22	8	Ret	DNS	DNS	10	6	Ret	26	9	7	2357
11	(Australia) James Courtney	4	Ret	Ret	8	18	8	12	5	Ret	15	Ret	27	16	6	23	3	3	Ret	9	8	3	9	3	17	12	6	5	13	Ret	5	24	7	9	Ret	12	2347
12	(Australia) Paul Dumbrell	11	12	6	10	11	11	11	20	12	3	14	7	8	Ret	13	15	Ret	15	14	12	Ret	28	5	12	Ret	Ret	8	7	8	11	15	14	16	20	13	2332
13	(Australia) Cameron McConville	50	4	Ret	13	4	23	13	25	11	19	22	15	15	16	7	12	10	Ret	18	19	7	29	Ret	13	11	7	11	21	9	14	9	9	15	10	6	2099
14	(Australia) Jason Bargwanna	10	Ret	11	11	Ret	13	15	16	20	24	Ret	17	21	11	10	Ret	12	21	15	9	14	7	10	9	9	11	18	8	21	22	16	22	21	19	26	2053
15	(Brazil) Max Wilson	8	16	8	6	Ret	Ret	8	19	Ret	17	6	13	11	Ret	16	10	Ret	11	11	25	Ret	11	14	28	13	13	15	15	14	16	12	24	20	16	16	2038
16	(Australia) Mark Skaife	2	Ret	Ret	1	5	1	1	18	1	5	17	3	1	28	6	21	1	27	Ret	1	23	26	Ret	25	21	Ret	16	Ret	Ret	7	19	4	3	6	11	2036
17	(Australia) Dean Canto	34	20	18	16	21	Ret	22	1	22	22	3	20	14	19	20	16	15	13	16	24	19	6	17	18	25	16	10	20	17	24	13	17	13	14	10	2024
18	(New Zealand) Jason Richards	3	Ret	10	28	2	19	18	9	8	27	1	8	6	14	2	17	24	16	6	Ret	15	30	Ret	4	5	Ret	12	12	13	23	10	Ret	22	12	3	1993
19	(Australia) Will Davison	18	14	13	18	8	28	16	22	16	14	DSQ	23	13	Ret	14	19	19	12	26	22	8	4	Ret	14	19	17	9	6	12	Ret	Ret	Ret	6	7	Ret	1943
20	(Australia) Lee Holdsworth	33	18	24	19	16	16	24	12	24	16	16	12	28	20	19	18	Ret	20	25	3	6	6	17	21	23	Ret	22	24	22	15	14	26	18	11	21	1811
21	(Australia) Paul Morris	67	11	17	14	7	12	19	21	25	Ret	21	Ret	19	18	Ret	25	6	14	20	26	24	8	6	23	18	18	17	Ret	16	26	18	15	25	27	17	1810
22	(Australia) Steve Owen	55	Ret	DNS	25	23	22	17	15	13	13	7	11	17	24	18	24	25	26	28	Ret	12	12	7	27	24	15	21	19	Ret	17	25	13	11	29	15	1782
23	(Australia) John Bowe	12	19	14	17	Ret	DNS	25	Ret	21	23	13	19	20	13	21	27	11	23	23	23	13	5	11	16	15	Ret	28	18	11	19	27	18	24	21	24	1743
24	(New Zealand) Greg Murphy	51	5	Ret	Ret	15	15	14	3	19	9	Ret	Ret	26	9	12	11	17	10	13	Ret	10	29	Ret	19	20	12	Ret	DNS	DNS	12	7	12	12	17	9	1710
25	(Australia) Brad Jones	14	Ret	20	22	Ret	18	27	24	23	18	19	22	25	25	24	20	20	19	24	17	9	5	11	15	14	20	Ret	Ret	Ret	Ret	20	19	27	23	20	1612
26	(Australia) Andrew Jones	23	15	21	27	12	17	20	7	18	Ret	11	18	23	12	17	22	18	17	17	Ret	17	30	Ret	26	Ret	DNS	19	14	14	Ret	26	20	30	22	19	1283
27	(Australia) Warren Luff	25	17	16	24	22	26	23	26	27	21	18	28	31	4	27	23	16	28	22	Ret	18	23	Ret	24	Ret	Ret	23	22	20	18	17	21	17	13	28	1238
28	(New Zealand) Paul Radisich	021	23	12	21	Ret	14	31	6	15	20	Ret	16	18	21	11	13	13	7	Ret	14	16	13	Ret													1235
29	(Australia) Marcus Marshall	20	24	Ret	26	19	27	28	Ret	26	28	9	Ret	22	26	25	28	Ret	24	21	16	20	25	Ret	20	16	18	20	17	Ret	20	Ret	16	Ret	24	14	1040
30	(Australia) José Fernández	26	13	23							26	24	26				26	22	Ret	27	20	22	22	16	Ret	Ret	DNS				Ret	23	25	29	28	27	658
31	(Australia) Steven Ellery	39/67												27	15	Ret	29	26	22				8	6													594
32	(New Zealand) Fabian Coulthard	39/021			Ret	14	21				Ret	15	21							19	7	Ret	13	Ret													478
33	(Australia) Alan Gurr	39	21	22				26	23	17													19	Ret	22	17	DNS										457
34	(Australia) Tony Ricciardello	26						29	27	Ret				30	23	29							22	16				26	Ret	19							398
35	(Australia) Glenn Seton	4																					9	3													300
36	(Australia) Shane Price	11/39																					24	Ret				24	23	18				23	25	23	296
37	(Australia) Luke Youlden	1																					27	4													290
38	(New Zealand) Craig Baird	10/021																					7	10				25	Ret	DNS							287
39	(Australia) Tony Longhurst	55																					12	7													260
40	(Australia) Nathan Pretty	50																					10	8													250
40	(Australia) Paul Weel	50																					10	8													250
42	(Australia) Alex Davison	18																					14	9													240
42	(Australia) Grant Denyer	18																					14	9													240
44	(New Zealand) Mark Porter	26/12			23	Ret	24																18	DNS													226
45	(Australia) David Besnard	8																					11	14													220
46	(United Kingdom) Richard Lyons	88																					17	12													210
46	(Denmark) Allan Simonsen	88																					17	12													210
48	(Australia) Cameron McLean	5/33																					15	13													200
49	(Australia) Greg Ritter	33																					20	13													200
50	(New Zealand) Matt Halliday	5																					15	Ret													180
51	(Australia) Owen Kelly	23																					Ret	15													180
51	(Australia) Mark Noske	23																					Ret	15													180
53	(Australia) Tony D'Alberto	16																					16	Ret													170
53	(Australia) Anthony Tratt	16																					16	Ret													170
55	(Australia) Dale Brede	12																					18	Ret													150
56	(New Zealand) Kayne Scott	39																					19	Ret													140
57	(Australia) Jack Perkins	11/39																					24	Ret							21	Ret	DNS				130
58	(Australia) Ryan Briscoe	22																					21	Ret													120
58	(New Zealand) Jim Richards	22																					21	Ret													120
60	(Australia) Adam Macrow	25																					23	Ret													100
61	(New Zealand) Chris Pither	021																													25	22	23				97
62	(Australia) Jonathon Webb	20																					25	Ret													80
63	(Australia) Tony Evangelou	021																																28	Ret	25	44
	(Australia) Phillip Scifleet	33																					20														0
	(Australia) Michael Caruso	12																						Ret													0
	(Australia) David Brabham	5																						Ret													0
Pos.	Driver	ADE (South Australia)		PUK (New Zealand)			BAR (Western Australia)			WIN (Victoria (state))			HID (Northern Territory)			QLD (Queensland)			ORA (New South Wales)			SAN (Victoria (state))	BAT (New South Wales)	SUR (Queensland)			SYM (Tasmania)			BAH (Bahrain)			PHI (Victoria (state))			Pts.	

Colour	Result
Gold	Winner
Silver	Second place
Bronze	Third place
Green	Points classification
Blue	Non-points classification
Blue	Non-classified finish (NC)
Purple	Retired, not classified (Ret)
Red	Did not qualify (DNQ)
Red	Did not pre-qualify (DNPQ)
Black	Disqualified (DSQ)
White	Did not start (DNS)
White	Withdrew (WD)
White	Race cancelled (C)
Blank	Did not practice (DNP)
Blank	Did not arrive (DNA)
Blank	Excluded (EX)

=== Teams championship ===
Pos	Team	Penalty	Rd 1	Rd 2	Rd 3	Rd 4	Rd 5	Rd 6	Rd 7	Rd 8	Rd 9	Rd 10	Rd 11	Rd 12	Rd 13	Total
1	HSV Dealer Team	0	575	466	498	532	564	604	420	480	310	551	601	500	492	6597
2	Ford Performance Racing	0	255	494	400	528	468	538	374	500	0	574	616	516	554	5817
3	Triple Eight Race Engineering	0	470	432	484	492	484	500	480	460	530	343	187	440	400	5702
4	Stone Brothers Racing	0	250	520	390	268	402	452	454	300	590	472	377	394	246	5115
5	Perkins Engineering	0	510	436	488	478	326	398	262	140	280	240	506	442	426	4932
6	Dick Johnson Racing	0	430	370	378	280	306	296	416	480	240	397	364	183	321	4461
7	Holden Racing Team	0	290	384	424	432	386	220	278	190	0	380	334	535	570	4423
8	WPS Racing	0	320	276	286	298	340	270	300	480	420	384	356	288	267	4285
9	Paul Weel Racing	0	285	286	376	246	370	342	364	270	250	387	193	450	430	4249
10	Garry Rogers Motorsport	0	265	250	266	342	258	296	342	400	360	207	277	296	370	3929
11	Tasman Motorsport	0	265	268	372	292	416	288	308	30	180	213	317	176	301	3426
12	Brad Jones Racing	0	230	168	162	268	224	242	304	430	220	283	200	207	196	3134
13	Paul Morris Motorsport	0	305	298	224	108	146	236	210	390	270	173	223	173	193	2949
14	Britek Motorsport	0	265	162	106	172	138	144	198	210	170	30	183	203	187	2168
15	Rod Nash Racing (S)	0	0	96	180	220	142	80	104	210	260	110	87	147	146	1782
16	Team Kiwi Racing (S)	0	155	124	134	120	172	224	106	200	0		27	97	44	1403
17	Paul Cruickshank Racing (S)	0	45	80	48	68	90	56	134	80	0	150	96	100	93	1040

(S) denotes a single car team.

=== Manufacturers championship ===
Ford won the Manufacturers Championship, having gained the most round victories over the course of the championship.

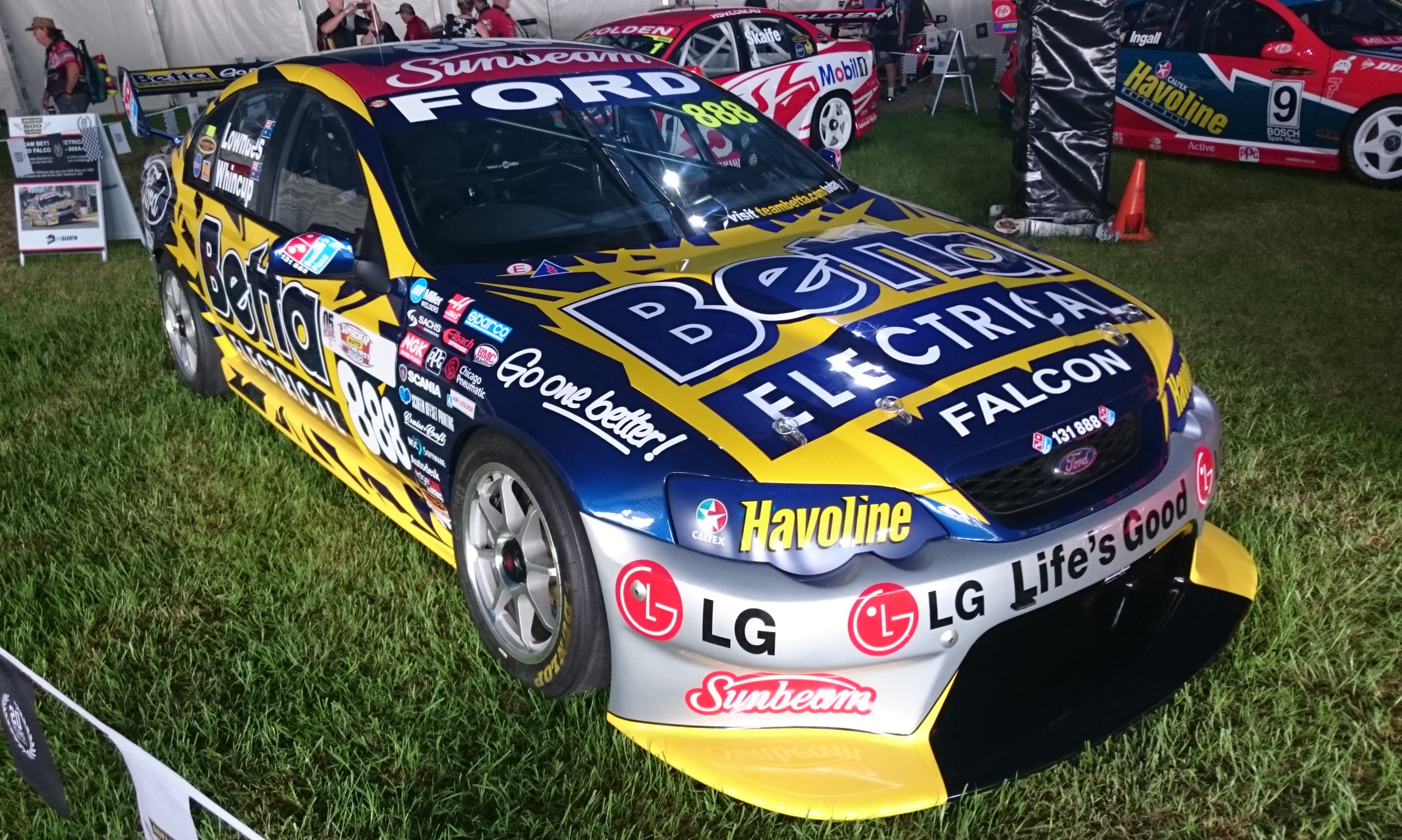
Ford won the Manufacturers Championship with its Falcon BA

.
