= Chevrolet Supercars Middle East Championship =

Racing championship held in the Middle East

- Category: One-make racing
- Country: Middle East
- Inaugural season: 2005–06
- Folded: 2011–12
- Constructors: Chevrolet
- Tyre suppliers: Pirelli
- Last Drivers' champion: (France) Alban Varutti (SC09) (Bahrain) Nasser Al Alawi (SC06)
- Official website: www.supercarsme.com Archived with Wayback Machine

The Chevrolet Supercars Middle East Championship (also known as the Chevrolet Lumina CSV Championship Middle East) was a one-make auto racing championship for Chevrolet Luminas held in the Middle East.

== History ==
Run by the Bahrain International Circuit, the Chevrolet Supercars Middle East Championship was launched in 2005 in an attempt to establish a domestic racing scene in the Middle East. Vehicles were Improved Production versions of Holden Commodore VZs re-badged as Chevrolet Luminas, utilising LS engines and a four-speed gearbox. For the 2009–10 season, the championship developed a class structure whereby the Holden Commodore VE was introduced as the top-class Chevrolet Lumina SC09 and the VZ model became a secondary-class Chevrolet Lumina SC06, with the SC09 cars 50hp better than the previous generation.

The championship was held over six seasons, each held in the Middle Eastern winter. No championship was held in 2008–09. Bahraini driver Fahad Al Musalam was the series' most successful driver with two titles. Due to the vehicles similarity to V8 Supercars, Al Musalam and compatriot Raed Raffii earned tests with Garry Rogers Motorsport and Paul Morris Motorsport respectively – Al Musalam going on to race for Team Kiwi Racing in the 2008 Desert 400.

== Circuits ==
- Bahrain International Circuit (2005–06 to 2007–08, 2009–10 to 2011–12)
- (United Arab Emirates) Dubai Autodrome (2007–08)
- (United Arab Emirates) Yas Marina Circuit (2009–10)
- (Saudi Arabia) Reem International Circuit (2009–10 to 2010–11)

== Champions ==
Chevrolet Lumina CSV Championship Middle East
Season	Champion	
2005–06	(United Kingdom) Jamie Morrow	
2006–07	(Australia) Tarek El Gammal	
2007–08	(Bahrain) Fahad Al Musalam	
Chevrolet Supercars Middle East Championship
Season	SC09 Champion	SC06 Champion
2009–10	(Bahrain) Fahad Al Musalam	(Bahrain) Faisal Raffii
2010–11	(Bahrain) Raed Raffii	(Bahrain) Ezra Idafar
2011–12	(France) Alban Varutti	(Bahrain) Nasser Al Alawi
