= Al-Reem =

Al-Reem may refer to:

- Al Reem Biosphere Preserve in Qatar
- Al Reem Island in Abu Dhabi
- Khubayb Al Reem, a preserve providing habitat for a type of deer (Al Reem)
