= Fahad Al Musalam =

Racing driver from Bahrain

- Nationality: Bahraini
- Born: 26 June 1974 (age 52) Manama, Bahrain

V8 Supercars
- Years active: 2008
- Teams: Team Kiwi Racing
- Starts: 3
- Wins: 0
- Poles: 0
- Fastest laps: 0
- Best finish: 60th in 2008

Previous series
- 2008–2012 2006: Chevrolet Supercars Middle East Championship; Porsche Supercup

Championship titles
- 2008, 2010: Chevrolet Supercars Middle East Championship

Fahad Al Musalam (Arabic: فهد المسلم; born 26 June 1974) is a racing driver from Bahrain.

== Biography ==
Al Musalam competed in the Porsche Supercup support race to the 2006 Bahrain Grand Prix in a guest entry, finishing the race in 23rd.

Al Musalam was a regular in the Chevrolet Supercars Middle East Championship in the late-2000s and early-2010s, a single-make Improved Production series for Chevrolet Luminas based at the Bahrain International Circuit. He won the 2007–08 series, earning a test with V8 Supercars team Garry Rogers Motorsport at Winton Motor Raceway. Later that season, Team Kiwi Racing hired Al Musalam to compete in the 2008 Desert 400 at the Bahrain International Circuit, becoming the first Middle Eastern driver to compete in V8 Supercars. Al Musalam qualified last, over 1.5 seconds behind Andrew Jones in second-last, and finished a best of 23rd in the first of three races.

Al Musalam returned to the Chevrolet ME series, winning a second title in the 2009–10 season.

== Career results ==
=== Summary ===
Season	Series	Position	Car	Team
2006	Porsche Supercup	NC	Porsche 911 (997 I) GT3 Cup	Porsche AG
2007–08	Chevrolet Supercars Middle East Championship	**1st**	Chevrolet Lumina SC06	Lechner Racing
2008	V8 Supercars Championship Series	60th	Ford Falcon BF	Team Kiwi Racing
2009–10	Chevrolet Supercars Middle East Championship	**1st**	Chevrolet Lumina SC09	?
2011–12	Chevrolet Supercars Middle East Championship	13th	Chevrolet Lumina SC09	Speeding Saddles

=== Porsche Supercup results ===
(key) (Races in bold indicate pole position) (Races in italics indicate fastest lap) (Small number denotes finishing position)

Year	Team	1	2	3	4	5	6	7	8	9	10	11	12	Pos.	Pts
2006	Porsche AG	BHR; 23	IMO	NÜR	BCN	MCO	SIL	IMS; R1	IMS; R2	MGC	HOC	BUD	MNZ	NC†	0†

^{†}Guest driver ineligible for points.

=== V8 Supercars results ===
V8 Supercars results
Year	Team	No.	Car	1	2	3	4	5	6	7	8	9	10	11	12	13	14	15	16	17	18	19	20	21	22	23	24	25	26	27	28	29	30	31	32	33	34	35	36	37	Pos.	Pts
2008	Team Kiwi Racing	021	Ford Falcon BF	ADE; R1	ADE; R2	ECK; R1	ECK; R2	ECK; R3	HAM; R1	HAM; R2	HAM; R3	PER; R1	PER; R2	PER; R3	SAN; R1	SAN; R2	SAN; R3	DAR; R1	DAR; R2	DAR; R3	IPS; R1	IPS; R2	IPS; R3	WIN; R1	WIN; R2	WIN; R3	PHI	BAT	GCS; R1	GCS; R2	GCS; R3	BHR; R1; 23	BHR; R2; Ret	BHR; R3; 24	LAU; R1	LAU; R2	LAU; R3	OPK; R1	OPK; R2	OPK; R3	60th	46
