= Richard Williams (racing driver) =

British racing driver (born 1977)

Richard Williams (born 11 June 1977) is a British racing driver who competed in the Porsche Mobil 1 Supercup as a member of the SPS Automotive Performance Team.

Williams was born in Yeovil, Somerset. He entered motor sport through karting before moving to cars. After coming fourth overall with a single race win the Renault Clio Cup in 2004, he entered the 2005 BTCC in a Lexus, ran by SpeedEquipe and sponsored by Friends Reunited and HPI Racing. He came 14th overall in a small field, with a best result of seventh . In 2006, he contested the Porsche Carrera Cup, with a best result of third, also entering the Supercup round at Silverstone as a wild card of sorts. For 2007, he contested the British GT Championship

== Racing record ==
=== Complete British Touring Car Championship results ===
(key) (Races in bold indicate pole position – 1 point awarded just in first race) (Races in italics indicate fastest lap – 1 point awarded all races) (* signifies that driver lead race for at least one lap – 1 point awarded all races)

Year	Team	Car	1	2	3	4	5	6	7	8	9	10	11	12	13	14	15	16	17	18	19	20	21	22	23	24	25	26	27	28	29	30	DC	Pts
2005	HPI Racing	Lexus IS200	DON; 1 NC	DON; 2; 9	**DON**; **3**; 11	THR; 1 DNS	THR; 2 DNS	THR; 3 DNS	BRH; 1 Ret	BRH; 2 DNS	BRH; 3; 9	OUL; 1; 13	OUL; 2; 9	OUL; 3 Ret	CRO; 1; 13	CRO; 2; 12	CRO; 3 Ret	MON; 1; 15	MON; 2; 12	MON; 3; 13	SNE; 1; 13	SNE; 2; 12	SNE; 3; 9	KNO; 1 DNS	KNO; 2 Ret	KNO; 3 DNS	SIL; 1; 12	SIL; 2; 7	SIL; 3 Ret	BRH; 1; 11	BRH; 2 Ret	BRH; 3; 9	14th	14

=== Complete Porsche Supercup results ===
(key) (Races in bold indicate pole position – 2 points awarded 2008 onwards in all races) (Races in italics indicate fastest lap)

Year	Team	Car	1	2	3	4	5	6	7	8	9	10	11	12	13	DC	Points
2006	IN2RACING	Porsche 997 GT3	BHR	ITA1	GER1	ESP	MON	GBR; 15								NC†	0†
2006	Morellato Racing Team PZ Essen	Porsche 997 GT3							USA1; 8	USA2; Ret	FRA	GER2	HUN			NC†	0†
2006	Morellato Stars Team	Porsche 997 GT3												ITA2; 10		NC†	0†
2007	Racing Team Indonesia	Porsche 997 GT3	BHR1; 9	BHR2; 11	ESP1; 19	MON; 11	FRA; 8	GBR; Ret	GER; 8	HUN; 12	TUR; Ret	ITA; 9	BEL; 8			10th	60
2008	Jetstream Motorsport	Porsche 997 GT3	BHR1	BHR2	ESP1	TUR	MON	FRA	GBR	GER	HUN	ESP2	BEL; 15	ITA		NC†	0†
2009	SPS Automotive	Porsche 997 GT3	BHR1; Ret	BHR2; 5	ESP1; 8	MON; Ret	TUR; 8	GBR; 12	GER; 6	HUN; Ret	ESP2; 5	BEL; 6	ITA; 18	UAE1; 12	UAE2; 10	8th	90

† Not eligible for points.

=== Complete British GT results ===
(key) (Races in bold indicate pole position) (Races in italics indicate fastest lap)

Year	Team	Car	Class	1	2	3	4	5	6	7	8	9	10	11	12	13	14	DC	Pts
2007	Trackspeed	Porsche 997 GT3 Cup	GT3	OUL; 1; 14	OUL; 2; 5	DON; 1	DON; 2	SNE	BRH; 1	BRH; 2	SIL	THR; 1	THR; 2	CRO; 1	CRO; 2	ROC; 1	ROC; 2	23rd	4
2008	Trackspeed	Porsche 997 GT3 Cup S	GT3	OUL; 1; 4	OUL; 2; 19	KNO; 1; 4	KNO; 2; 11	ROC; 1	ROC; 2	SNE; 1	SNE; 2	THR; 1	THR; 2	BRH; 1	BRH; 2	DON	SIL	30th	11
