= 2008 V8 Supercar Championship Series =

Motor racing competition

The 2008 V8 Supercar Championship Series was the tenth V8 Supercar Championship Series and the twelfth series in which V8 Supercars contested the premier Australian touring car title. The championship began on 21 February at the Clipsal 500 on the streets of Adelaide and concluded on 7 December at Oran Park Raceway. It consisted of 14 rounds covering all states and the Northern Territory of Australia as well as rounds in New Zealand and Bahrain.

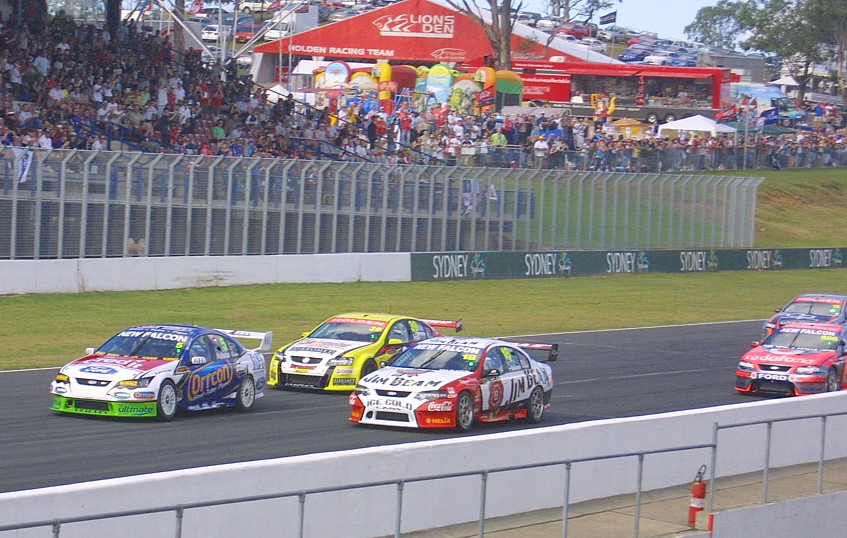
Race start at Round 2, Eastern Creek

Jamie Whincup secured the Drivers championship with two races in hand with victory in race 1 of the 2008 NRMA Motoring & Services Grand Finale. Whincup was also awarded the 49th Australian Touring Car Championship title by CAMS. Triple Eight Race Engineering won the Teams Championship and Ford was awarded the Manufacturers Championship.

== Teams and drivers ==
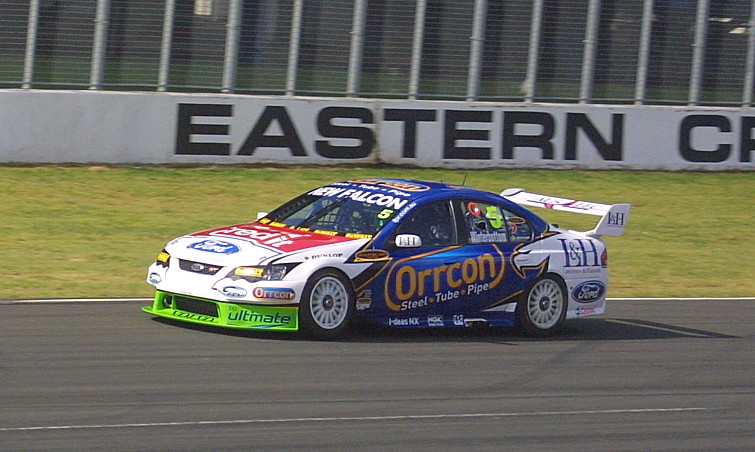
Mark Winterbottom driving a Ford Falcon BF for Ford Performance Racing

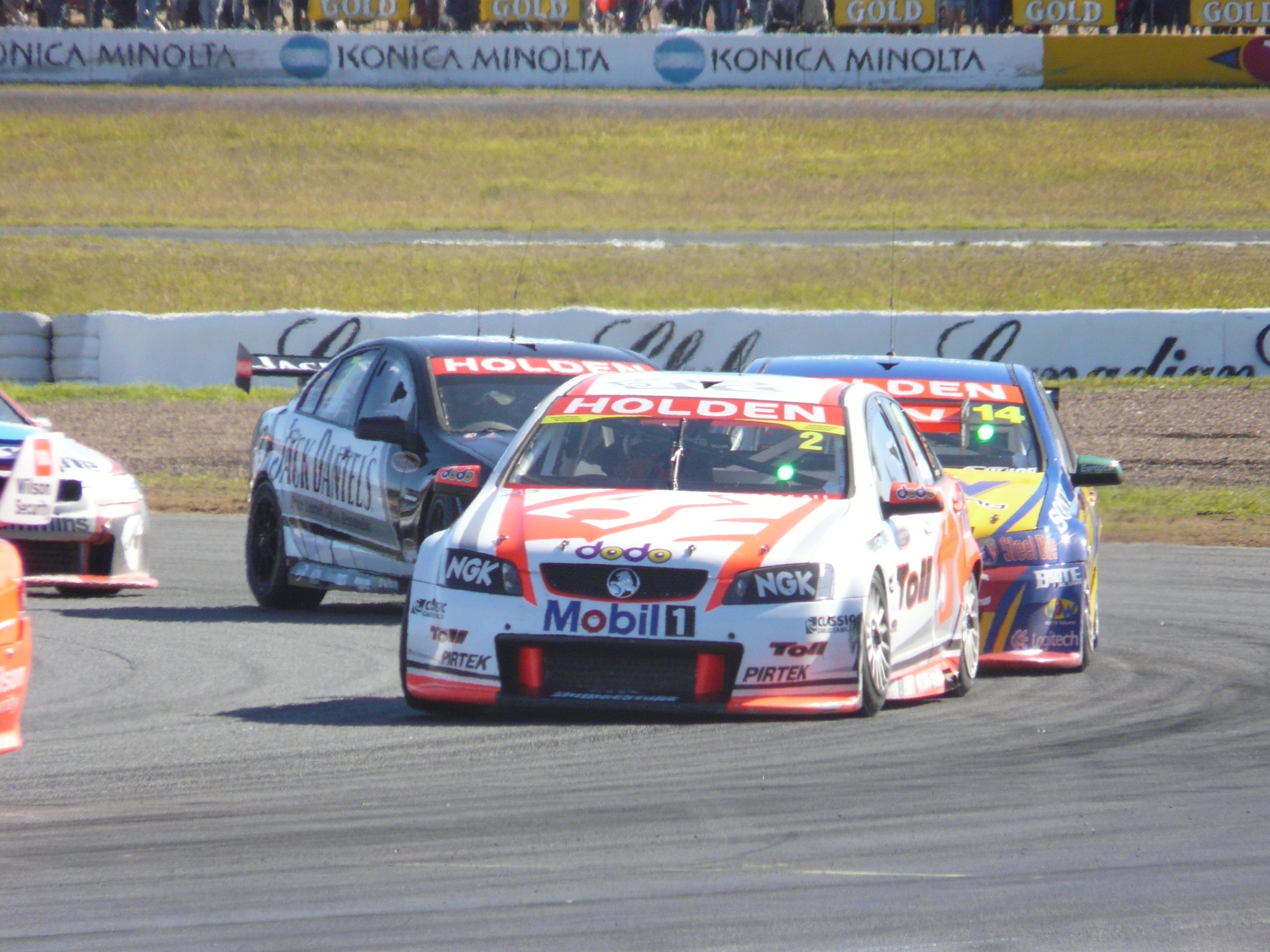
Mark Skaife driving a Holden Commodore VE for the Holden Racing Team

The following teams and drivers competed in the 2008 championship.

Manufacturer	Model	Team	No.	Driver name	Rounds	Co-driver name
Ford	Falcon BF	Stone Brothers Racing	4	(Australia) James Courtney	All	(Australia) David Besnard
Ford	Falcon BF	Stone Brothers Racing	9	(New Zealand) Shane van Gisbergen	All	(Australia) Jonathon Webb
Ford	Falcon BF	Ford Performance Racing	5	(Australia) Mark Winterbottom	All	(Australia) Luke Youlden (Australia) Dean Canto
Ford	Falcon BF	Ford Performance Racing	6	(New Zealand) Steven Richards	All	(Australia) Luke Youlden (Australia) Dean Canto
Ford	Falcon BF	Dick Johnson Racing	17	(Australia) Steven Johnson	All	(Australia) Steve Owen (Australia) Warren Luff
Ford	Falcon BF	Dick Johnson Racing	18	(Australia) Will Davison	All	(Australia) Steve Owen (Australia) Warren Luff
Ford	Falcon BF	Team Kiwi Racing	021	(New Zealand) Kayne Scott	1, 3–7	(New Zealand) Kayne Scott
Ford	Falcon BF	Team Kiwi Racing	021	(New Zealand) Chris Pither	2, 8–10	(New Zealand) Kayne Scott
Ford	Falcon BF	Team Kiwi Racing	021	(Australia) Steve Owen	11	(New Zealand) Kayne Scott
Ford	Falcon BF	Team Kiwi Racing	021	(Bahrain) Fahad Al Musalam	12	(New Zealand) Kayne Scott
Ford	Falcon BF	Team Kiwi Racing	021	(New Zealand) Daniel Gaunt	13–14	(New Zealand) Kayne Scott
Ford	Falcon BF	Britek Motorsport	25	(Australia) Jason Bright	All	(Australia) Adam Macrow
Ford	Falcon BF	Britek Motorsport	26	(Australia) Marcus Marshall	All	(New Zealand) Matthew Halliday
Ford	Falcon BF	Triple Eight Race Engineering	88	(Australia) Jamie Whincup	All	(Italy) Fabrizio Giovanardi (United Kingdom) Marc Hynes
Ford	Falcon BF	Triple Eight Race Engineering	888	(Australia) Craig Lowndes	All	(Italy) Fabrizio Giovanardi (United Kingdom) Marc Hynes
Ford	Falcon BF	Paul Cruickshank Racing	111	(New Zealand) Fabian Coulthard	All	(New Zealand) John McIntyre* (Australia) Alex Davison**
Ford	Falcon BF	Ford Rising Stars Racing	777	(Australia) Michael Patrizi	3–14	(Australia) Grant Denyer* (Australia) Karl Reindler**
Holden	Commodore VE	Holden Racing Team	1	(Australia) Garth Tander	All	(Australia) Glenn Seton (New Zealand) Craig Baird
Holden	Commodore VE	Holden Racing Team	2	(Australia) Mark Skaife	All	(Australia) Glenn Seton (New Zealand) Craig Baird
Holden	Commodore VE	Tasman Motorsport	3	(New Zealand) Jason Richards	All	(Australia) Mark Noske (Australia) Dale Wood
Holden	Commodore VE	Tasman Motorsport	51	(New Zealand) Greg Murphy	All	(Australia) Mark Noske (Australia) Dale Wood
Holden	Commodore VE	Perkins Engineering	7	(Australia) Todd Kelly	All	(Australia) Nathan Pretty (Australia) Jack Perkins
Holden	Commodore VE	Perkins Engineering	11	(Australia) Shane Price	1–10	(Australia) Nathan Pretty (Australia) Jack Perkins
Holden	Commodore VE	Perkins Engineering	11	(Australia) Jack Perkins	11–14	(Australia) Nathan Pretty (Australia) Jack Perkins
Holden	Commodore VE	Brad Jones Racing	12	(Australia) Andrew Jones	All	(Australia) Brad Jones (Brazil) Max Wilson
Holden	Commodore VE	Brad Jones Racing	14	(Australia) Cameron McConville	All	(Australia) Brad Jones (Brazil) Max Wilson
Holden	Commodore VE	HSV Dealer Team (HRT)	15	(Australia) Rick Kelly	All	(New Zealand) Paul Radisich
Holden	Commodore VE	HSV Dealer Team (HRT)	16	(Australia) Paul Dumbrell	All	(Australia) David Reynolds
Holden	Commodore VE	Garry Rogers Motorsport	33	(Australia) Lee Holdsworth	All	(Australia) Greg Ritter (Australia) Steven Ellery
Holden	Commodore VE	Garry Rogers Motorsport	34	(Australia) Michael Caruso	All	(Australia) Greg Ritter (Australia) Steven Ellery
Holden	Commodore VE	Paul Morris Motorsport	39	(Australia) Russell Ingall	All	(United States) Boris Said (United Kingdom) Matt Neal
Holden	Commodore VE	Paul Morris Motorsport	67	(Australia) Paul Morris	All	(United States) Boris Said (United Kingdom) Matt Neal
Holden	Commodore VE	Paul Weel Racing	50	(Australia) Andrew Thompson	All	(Australia) Paul Weel
Holden	Commodore VE	Rod Nash Racing; Tony D'Alberto Racing	55	(Australia) Tony D'Alberto	All	(Australia) Jason Bargwanna

* Phillip Island 500 only
** Bathurst 1000 only

=== Team and driver changes ===
WPS Racing announced the closure of their team with the vehicles and equipment sold off to new owners, citing business and health issues affecting team principal Craig Gore.

Two new entities entered the championship in 2008. The first of these was Development Series team Ford Rising Stars Racing, who bought a licence from Paul Weel Racing – Formula 3 Euroseries driver Michael Patrizi was hired to drive, but the team skipped the first round in Adelaide to prepare properly. Walden Motorsport were committed to return to the series with Garth Walden driving, however the team failed to appear at the first two rounds and the franchise was put up for sale.

Reigning series champion Garth Tander transferred from the HSV Dealer Team to the Holden Racing Team, replacing Todd Kelly. Kelly replaced Marcus Marshall at Perkins Engineering, with Marshall moving to Britek Motorsport in place of the outgoing Alan Gurr. Tander was replaced at HSVDT with Paul Dumbrell, who moved from Paul Weel Racing which had intended to cease operations at the conclusion of 2007. This decision was reversed, with Andrew Thompson racing their sole Commodore VE.

Russell Ingall moved to Paul Morris Motorsport, replacing Owen Kelly. Shane van Gisbergen took over Ingall's seat at Stone Brothers Racing following his half-season at Team Kiwi Racing. Team Kiwi cut ties with Stone Brothers and settled on running a Triple Eight-built Falcon independently, signing Development Series veteran Kayne Scott.

Dean Canto's contract with Garry Rogers Motorsport was terminated a year early. He was replaced with 2007 Development Series runner-up Michael Caruso.

Cameron McConville signed with Brad Jones Racing, whom he had previously raced for in Super Touring. The team moved from Ford to Holden and ran with the technical assistance of Walkinshaw Performance, the organisation that runs the Holden Racing Team and HSV Dealer Teams.

Paul Cruickshank Racing signed Fabian Coulthard to replace the retiring John Bowe.

Second tier Fujitsu series champion team Tony D'Alberto Racing moved to the V8 Supercar series, and took over the running of the Rod Nash Racing owned franchise, replacing Independent Racing Cars who previously operated the team. Tony D'Alberto replaced Steve Owen as driver.

Walden Motorsport purchased a Racing Entitlements Contract and was entered in the first round at Adelaide. Having initially entered a Holden Commodore VE but not purchased one, the team attempted to source a Ford Falcon BF but could not do so in time for the event and did not participate, despite Garth Walden himself being in attendance.

=== Mid-season changes ===
Due to a date clash with the final round of the New Zealand V8 series, Kayne Scott was not available to compete for Team Kiwi Racing at Eastern Creek and was replaced by Chris Pither. Pither again replaced Scott for the Winton round later in the year. Following a crash at Bathurst that severely dented the teams' financial resources, Steve Owen was drafted in for the Gold Coast round, followed by Bahraini driver Fahad Al Musalam for the Desert 400 and 23-year-old Daniel Gaunt for the final two rounds of the season.

Shane Price was sacked from Perkins Engineering a week after the Bathurst 1000 and replaced with endurance co-driver Jack Perkins.

== Race calendar ==
Rd.	Race title	Circuit	City / state	Date
1	(South Australia) Clipsal 500	Adelaide Street Circuit	Adelaide, South Australia	21–24 February
2	(New South Wales) Eastern Creek	Eastern Creek Raceway	Sydney, New South Wales	7–9 March
3	(New Zealand) Hamilton 400	Hamilton Street Circuit	Hamilton, New Zealand	18–20 April
4	(Western Australia) BigPond 400	Barbagallo Raceway	Wanneroo, Western Australia	9–11 May
5	(Victoria (state)) Midas 400	Sandown Raceway	Melbourne, Victoria	7–9 June
6	(Northern Territory) Skycity Triple Crown	Hidden Valley Raceway	Darwin, Northern Territory	4–6 July
7	(Queensland) City of Ipswich 400	Queensland Raceway	Ipswich, Queensland	18–20 July
8	(Victoria (state)) Winton	Winton Motor Raceway	Benalla, Victoria	1–3 August
9	(Victoria (state)) L&H 500	Phillip Island Grand Prix Circuit	Phillip Island, Victoria	12–14 September
10	(New South Wales) Supercheap Auto Bathurst 1000	Mount Panorama Circuit	Bathurst, New South Wales	9–12 October
11	(Queensland) The Coffee Club V8 Supercar Challenge	Surfers Paradise Street Circuit	Surfers Paradise, Queensland	23–26 October
12	(Bahrain) Gulf Air Desert 400	Bahrain International Circuit	Manama, Bahrain	6–8 November
13	Falken Tasmania Challenge	Symmons Plains Raceway	Launceston, Tasmania	21–23 November
14	(New South Wales) NRMA Motoring & Services Grand Finale	Oran Park Raceway	Sydney, New South Wales	4–7 December

Australian rounds
New Zealand rounds
Bahrain rounds

== Rule changes ==
=== Technical ===
An option to use sequential gearboxes in lieu of H-pattern gearboxes was introduced. Initially optional, sequential gearboxes later became mandatory.

=== Sporting ===
The points system was changed for 2008. Points were awarded to the top 30 drivers, with 300 points being the most available to a driver in each round.

In Friday practice sessions, drivers who had finished in the top 15 in the 2007 Championship were not permitted to participate for the first 30 minutes.

== Results and standings ==
=== Season summary ===
Round	Race	Event	Pole position	Race winners	Round winner	Report
1	R1	Adelaide	(Australia) Jamie Whincup	(Australia) Jamie Whincup	(Australia) Jamie Whincup (Triple Eight Race Engineering, Ford)	report
1	R2	Adelaide		(Australia) Jamie Whincup	(Australia) Jamie Whincup (Triple Eight Race Engineering, Ford)	report
2	R1	Eastern Creek	(Australia) Garth Tander	(Australia) Garth Tander	(Australia) Will Davison (Dick Johnson Racing, Ford)	report
2	R2	Eastern Creek		(Australia) Will Davison	(Australia) Will Davison (Dick Johnson Racing, Ford)	report
2	R3	Eastern Creek		(Australia) Mark Winterbottom	(Australia) Will Davison (Dick Johnson Racing, Ford)	report
3	R1	Hamilton	(New Zealand) Steven Richards	(Australia) Garth Tander	(Australia) Garth Tander (Holden Racing Team, Holden)	report
3	R2	Hamilton		(Australia) Garth Tander	(Australia) Garth Tander (Holden Racing Team, Holden)	report
3	R3	Hamilton		(Australia) Garth Tander	(Australia) Garth Tander (Holden Racing Team, Holden)	report
4	R1	Perth	(Australia) Mark Winterbottom	(Australia) Mark Winterbottom	(Australia) Mark Winterbottom (Ford Performance Racing, Ford)	report
4	R2	Perth		(Australia) Mark Winterbottom	(Australia) Mark Winterbottom (Ford Performance Racing, Ford)	report
4	R3	Perth		(Australia) Mark Winterbottom	(Australia) Mark Winterbottom (Ford Performance Racing, Ford)	report
5	R1	Sandown	(Australia) Jamie Whincup	(Australia) Jamie Whincup	(Australia) Jamie Whincup (Triple Eight Race Engineering, Ford)	report
5	R2	Sandown		(Australia) Craig Lowndes	(Australia) Jamie Whincup (Triple Eight Race Engineering, Ford)	report
5	R3	Sandown		(Australia) Jamie Whincup	(Australia) Jamie Whincup (Triple Eight Race Engineering, Ford)	report
6	R1	Darwin	(Australia) Mark Winterbottom	(Australia) Mark Winterbottom	(New Zealand) Steven Richards (Ford Performance Racing, Ford)	report
6	R2	Darwin		(Australia) Garth Tander	(New Zealand) Steven Richards (Ford Performance Racing, Ford)	report
6	R3	Darwin		(New Zealand) Steven Richards	(New Zealand) Steven Richards (Ford Performance Racing, Ford)	report
7	R1	Ipswich	(Australia) James Courtney	(Australia) James Courtney	(Australia) Mark Winterbottom (Ford Performance Racing, Ford)	report
7	R2	Ipswich		(Australia) Mark Winterbottom	(Australia) Mark Winterbottom (Ford Performance Racing, Ford)	report
7	R3	Ipswich		(Australia) Mark Winterbottom	(Australia) Mark Winterbottom (Ford Performance Racing, Ford)	report
8	R1	Winton	(Australia) Mark Winterbottom	(Australia) Jamie Whincup	(Australia) Garth Tander (Holden Racing Team, Holden)	report
8	R2	Winton		(Australia) Will Davison	(Australia) Garth Tander (Holden Racing Team, Holden)	report
8	R3	Winton		(Australia) Garth Tander	(Australia) Garth Tander (Holden Racing Team, Holden)	report
9		Phillip Island	(Australia) Craig Lowndes (Australia) Jamie Whincup	(Australia) Garth Tander (Australia) Mark Skaife (Holden Racing Team, Holden)		report
10		Bathurst	(Australia) Garth Tander	(Australia) Craig Lowndes (Australia) Jamie Whincup (Triple Eight Race Engineering, Ford)		report
11	R1	Gold Coast	(Australia) Jamie Whincup	(Australia) Jamie Whincup	(Australia) Jamie Whincup (Triple Eight Race Engineering, Ford)	report
11	R2	Gold Coast		(Australia) Jamie Whincup	(Australia) Jamie Whincup (Triple Eight Race Engineering, Ford)	report
11	R3	Gold Coast		(Australia) Jamie Whincup	(Australia) Jamie Whincup (Triple Eight Race Engineering, Ford)	report
12	R1	Bahrain	(Australia) Jamie Whincup	(Australia) Jamie Whincup	(Australia) Jamie Whincup (Triple Eight Race Engineering, Ford)	report
12	R2	Bahrain		(Australia) Jamie Whincup	(Australia) Jamie Whincup (Triple Eight Race Engineering, Ford)	report
12	R3	Bahrain		(Australia) Jamie Whincup	(Australia) Jamie Whincup (Triple Eight Race Engineering, Ford)	report
13	R1	Launceston	(Australia) Garth Tander	(Australia) Todd Kelly	(Australia) Jamie Whincup (Triple Eight Race Engineering, Ford)	report
13	R2	Launceston		(Australia) Jamie Whincup	(Australia) Jamie Whincup (Triple Eight Race Engineering, Ford)	report
13	R3	Launceston		(Australia) Jamie Whincup	(Australia) Jamie Whincup (Triple Eight Race Engineering, Ford)	report
14	R1	Oran Park	(Australia) Garth Tander	(Australia) Jamie Whincup	(Australia) Garth Tander (Holden Racing Team, Holden)	report
14	R2	Oran Park		(Australia) Garth Tander	(Australia) Garth Tander (Holden Racing Team, Holden)	report
14	R3	Oran Park		(Australia) Rick Kelly	(Australia) Garth Tander (Holden Racing Team, Holden)	report

=== Points system ===
Points are awarded to any driver that completes 75% of race distance and is running on the completion of the final lap.

Pos	1st	2nd	3rd	4th	5th	6th	7th	8th	9th	10th	11th	12th	13th	14th	15th	16th	17th	18th	19th	20th	21st	22nd	23rd	24th	25th	26th	27th	28th	29th	30th
Adelaide	150	138	129	120	111	102	96	90	84	78	72	69	66	63	60	57	54	51	48	45	42	39	36	33	30	27	24	21	18	15
Std	100	92	86	80	74	68	64	60	56	52	48	46	44	42	40	38	36	34	32	30	28	26	24	22	20	18	16	14	12	10
L&H 500 Qual	50	46	43	40	37	34	32	30	28	26	24	23	22	21	20	19	18	17	16	15	14	13	12	11	10	9	8	7	6	5
L&H 500 Feature	200	184	172	160	148	136	128	120	112	104	96	92	88	84	80	76	72	68	64	60	56	52	48	44	40	36	32	28	24	20
Bathurst	300	276	258	240	222	204	192	180	168	156	144	138	132	126	120	114	108	102	96	90	84	78	72	66	60	54	48	42	36	30

NOTES:

Adelaide: Clipsal 500.

Std denotes all races except the Clipsal 500, L&H 500, and Bathurst 1000. These three races have unique rules.

L&H 500: Phillip Island races are split into qualifying races and 500 km feature race. The two drivers per team will be grouped into separate qualifying races that will count towards drivers' individual point totals and towards the starting grid for the feature race. The two drivers will then race one car for the 500 km endurance race.

Bathurst: Both drivers will share one car for entire race.

=== Drivers' Championship ===
Pos.	Driver	No.	ADE (South Australia)		EAS (New South Wales)			HAM (New Zealand)			BAR (Western Australia)			SAN (Victoria (state))			HID (Northern Territory)			QLD (Queensland)			WIN (Victoria (state))			PHI (Victoria (state))	BAT (New South Wales)	SUR (Queensland)			BAH (Bahrain)			SYM (Tasmania)			ORA (New South Wales)			Pen.	Pts.
1	(Australia) Jamie Whincup	88	1	1	3	5	4	DNS	DNS	DNS	7	3	3	1	3	1	4	5	8	9	3	6	1	4	2	2	1	1	1	1	1	1	1	2	1	1	1	Ret	23	0	3332
2	(Australia) Mark Winterbottom	5	2	Ret	10	2	1	10	7	5	1	1	1	2	6	2	1	3	2	2	1	1	21	2	26	4	4	3	3	3	21	4	4	3	4	4	23	12	18	0	3079
3	(Australia) Garth Tander	1	23	19	1	9	3	1	1	1	3	2	2	5	9	12	3	1	3	4	4	4	3	3	1	1	12	2	2	2	14	11	23	20	8	5	6	1	2	12	3048
4	(Australia) Craig Lowndes	888	3	Ret	7	3	8	19	14	7	5	4	4	3	1	DNS	5	4	Ret	28	12	7	11	5	6	2	1	6	9	9	2	3	3	6	2	2	2	5	3	0	2871
5	(Australia) Will Davison	18	7	Ret	2	1	6	9	22	Ret	8	5	6	Ret	11	7	8	10	5	6	5	5	2	1	4	3	6	7	10	10	Ret	10	6	4	5	6	10	15	21	0	2495
6	(Australia) James Courtney	4	16	Ret	5	15	Ret	4	3	3	20	8	7	6	4	3	10	23	7	1	6	2	9	9	25	6	3	9	11	Ret	5	7	2	Ret	17	10	5	6	4	0	2446
7	(Australia) Rick Kelly	15	8	6	4	6	2	2	6	4	6	6	5	7	12	17	9	9	6	8	Ret	13	10	6	5	7	20	Ret	6	5	9	22	20	19	9	8	9	4	1	0	2430
8	(New Zealand) Steven Richards	6	5	15	27	7	Ret	3	2	2	4	7	9	23	16	9	2	2	1	7	7	11	5	24	Ret	4	4	11	12	8	8	5	9	Ret	Ret	17	4	3	17	12	2416
9	(Australia) Russell Ingall	39	14	Ret	11	4	7	Ret	Ret	11	11	24	Ret	4	7	6	7	6	4	3	2	3	7	Ret	7	9	18	5	8	7	4	2	5	13	25	16	3	2	11	0	2236
10	(Australia) Steven Johnson	17	6	9	21	19	18	Ret	13	8	13	15	13	13	5	10	15	19	17	16	17	15	17	11	13	3	6	15	5	4	6	8	13	8	6	7	15	9	16	0	2163
11	(Australia) Lee Holdsworth	33	4	2	8	8	11	5	4	Ret	24	Ret	23	11	22	8	13	17	16	10	18	10	18	7	3	5	Ret	10	4	17	3	12	8	10	7	9	12	25	6	0	2065
12	(Australia) Todd Kelly	7	15	4	13	13	15	8	19	15	9	Ret	8	17	8	5	11	29	11	19	13	12	6	13	11	13	17	4	7	6	20	6	Ret	1	3	3	7	8	Ret	0	2053
13	(New Zealand) Fabian Coulthard	111	11	18	14	17	16	7	8	6	17	9	12	8	14	Ret	14	24	22	12	8	8	19	18	9	16	10	14	Ret	13	Ret	16	7	9	10	Ret	18	10	8	0	1823
14	(Australia) Mark Skaife	2	9	17	6	14	5	18	23	12	2	Ret	DNS	10	18	22	25	8	18	5	10	9	12	Ret	DNS	1	12	16	16	14	Ret	17	Ret	25	24	15	Ret	Ret	12	0	1644
15	(New Zealand) Shane van Gisbergen	9	12	5	17	27	17	21	26	10	Ret	12	10	9	2	4	12	15	9	17	21	17	14	22	12	10	Ret	17	13	Ret	7	26	10	5	Ret	EX	Ret	13	5	0	1614
16	(New Zealand) Greg Murphy	51	10	7	9	11	10	23	25	Ret	12	21	15	22	26	11	18	22	10	24	20	19	27	21	21	Ret	2	Ret	14	12	10	19	18	16	12	14	21	17	Ret	0	1572
17	(New Zealand) Jason Richards	3	13	8	12	16	19	20	9	14	Ret	22	Ret	18	20	16	6	7	Ret	14	14	22	4	Ret	DNS	Ret	2	13	17	11	Ret	DNS	DNS	11	18	12	16	18	14	0	1548
18	(Australia) Michael Caruso	34	Ret	11	25	26	14	12	18	17	Ret	17	16	20	23	19	16	12	15	15	16	16	8	Ret	20	5	Ret	20	18	19	15	14	17	17	16	18	8	11	10	0	1439
19	(Australia) Jason Bright	25	Ret	10	20	22	20	11	12	13	Ret	13	14	Ret	15	14	Ret	18	Ret	18	Ret	25	20	8	10	11	9	24	Ret	Ret	22	13	14	7	11	Ret	13	7	7	0	1438
20	(Australia) Paul Morris	67	Ret	16	18	10	Ret	24	17	18	16	11	25	15	21	24	20	26	13	27	15	Ret	13	12	15	9	18	25	19	Ret	11	9	12	23	14	13	14	14	9	0	1436
21	(Australia) Paul Dumbrell	16	Ret	Ret	16	12	9	14	11	Ret	15	16	22	12	13	27	19	11	14	11	11	20	15	10	8	Ret	20	8	Ret	16	12	18	11	21	13	20	19	Ret	13	0	1398
22	(Australia) Cameron McConville	14	Ret	3	15	18	12	6	5	20	10	10	Ret	14	10	13	Ret	16	12	13	9	14	23	23	19	Ret	Ret	12	22	Ret	13	25	21	14	15	Ret	11	19	22	0	1370
23	(Australia) Marcus Marshall	26	19	13	26	Ret	22	16	16	Ret	22	19	17	Ret	24	21	21	21	20	Ret	Ret	Ret	26	17	23	21	14	26	23	20	16	21	15	18	19	23	20	22	24	0	1113
24	(Australia) Andrew Jones	12	18	12	22	23	Ret	22	15	9	14	14	11	16	17	15	23	27	21	22	24	18	29	14	16	Ret	Ret	19	Ret	21	Ret	20	16	22	20	21	Ret	20	Ret	0	1071
25	(Australia) Tony D'Alberto	55	17	Ret	23	20	Ret	13	10	Ret	21	23	20	25	25	25	19	14	23	20	22	26	24	16	14	Ret	Ret	Ret	24	18	17	24	19	24	Ret	19	Ret	Ret	19	0	890
26	(Australia) Michael Patrizi	777						Ret	21	19	19	20	21	Ret	EX	26	26	20	19	25	25	23	25	20	24	18	19	21	Ret	22	24	23	22	12	21	26	Ret	21	25	0	848
27	(Australia) Shane Price	11	21	Ret	19	21	21	Ret	24	16	18	Ret	19	19	19	18	22	13	Ret	21	19	21	22	15	18	13	17													0	843
28	(Australia) Andrew Thompson	50	20	Ret	24	24	13	15	Ret	DNS	Ret	18	18	24	27	20	24	28	Ret	23	23	Ret	16	DNS	17	23	DNS	22	20	Ret	18	Ret	Ret	15	Ret	22	Ret	23	15	0	771
29	(Australia) Jack Perkins	11																								8	8	18	15	23	19	15	Ret	Ret	22	25	17	Ret	20	0	620
30	(Australia) David Besnard	4																								6	3													0	459
31	(New Zealand) Kayne Scott	021	22	14				17	20	Ret	23	Ret	24	21	28	23	Ret	25	24	26	Ret	24				DNS	Ret													0	362
32	(Australia) Steve Owen	17/021																								22	11	23	21	15										0	351
33	(Australia) Brad Jones	14																								15	5													0	343
33	(Brazil) Max Wilson	14																								15	5													0	343
35	(Australia) Nathan Pretty	11																								8	8													0	338
36	(Australia) Adam Macrow	25																								11	9													0	320
37	(Australia) Warren Luff	17																								22	11													0	259
38	(Australia) Dean Canto	5																								24	7													0	252
38	(Australia) Luke Youlden	5																								24	7													0	252
40	(Australia) Steven Ellery	34																								12	16													0	245
40	(Australia) Greg Ritter	34																								12	16													0	245
42	(Australia) Mark Noske	51																								20	13													0	226
42	(Australia) Dale Wood	51																								20	13													0	226
44	(New Zealand) Matt Halliday	26																								21	14													0	225
45	(Italy) Fabrizio Giovanardi	88																								17	15													0	222
45	(United Kingdom) Marc Hynes	88																								17	15													0	222
47	(New Zealand) Paul Radisich	15																								7	DNS													0	196
48	(Australia) Jonathon Webb	9																								10	Ret													0	190
49	(Australia) Alex Davison	111																									10													0	156
50	(New Zealand) Chris Pither	021			28	25	23																28	19	22	DNS	Ret													0	130
51	(New Zealand) John McIntyre	111																								16														0	128
52	(New Zealand) Craig Baird	2																								14	Ret													0	118
52	(Australia) Glenn Seton	2																								14	Ret													0	118
54	(New Zealand) Daniel Gaunt	021																																26	23	24	22	24	Ret	0	112
55	(Australia) Grant Denyer	777																								18														0	102
56	(Australia) Karl Reindler	777																									19													0	96
57	(United Kingdom) Matt Neal	67																								Ret	Ret													0	94
57	(United States) Boris Said	67																								Ret	Ret													0	94
59	(Australia) Paul Weel	50																								Ret	DNS													0	84
60	(Bahrain) Fahad Al Musalam	021																													23	Ret	24							0	46
61	(Australia) Jason Bargwanna	55																								Ret	Ret													0	38
62	(Australia) David Reynolds	16																								Ret	DNS													0	22
Pos.	Driver	No.	ADE (South Australia)		EAS (New South Wales)			HAM (New Zealand)			BAR (Western Australia)			SAN (Victoria (state))			HID (Northern Territory)			QLD (Queensland)			WIN (Victoria (state))			PHI (Victoria (state))	BAT (New South Wales)	SUR (Queensland)			BAH (Bahrain)			SYM (Tasmania)			ORA (New South Wales)			Pen.	Pts.

=== Teams Championship ===
Triple Eight Race Engineering won the Teams Championship.

Pos	Team	ADE (South Australia)	EAS (New South Wales)	HAM (New Zealand)	BAR (Western Australia)	SAN (Victoria (state))	HID (Northern Territory)	QLD (Queensland)	WIN (Victoria (state))	PHI (Victoria (state))	BAT (New South Wales)	SUR (Queensland)	BAH (Bahrain)	SYM (Tasmania)	ORA (New South Wales)	Pen.	Pts.
1	Triple Eight Race Engineering	429	450	138	470	472	368	334	462	360	420	480	564	292	124	0	5867
2	Ford Performance Racing	309	324	460	500	370	562	468	234	271	432	412	378	282	306	0	5308
3	Dick Johnson Racing	282	354	186	330	282	294	330	400	350	348	352	292	414	254	0	4478
4	Holden Racing Team	222	426	404	362	288	386	422	318	370	138	402	150	246	306	0	4432
5	Stone Brothers Racing	237	202	350	252	462	282	360	246	361	258	180	364	162	340	0	4060
6	HSV Dealer Team	192	380	330	314	252	306	230	346	218	90	246	240	250	350	0	3738
7	Garry Rogers Motorsport	330	248	270	120	220	242	254	274	330	114	268	310	280	294	0	3550
8	Paul Morris Motorsport	120	278	140	176	302	304	320	258	267	102	254	396	212	366	0	3491
9	Perkins Motorsport	222	216	192	182	268	178	210	260	281	288	308	170	318	190	0	3285
10	Tasman Motorsport	330	272	172	140	194	244	194	152	146	408	212	118	254	178	0	3018
11	Brad Jones Racing	249	170	294	236	252	152	224	172	170	222	132	160	166	136	0	2735
12	Britek Motorsport	192	130	214	180	132	120	54	220	251	294	100	218	202	250	0	2551
13	Paul Cruickshank Racing (s)	123	116	192	138	102	90	166	122	128	156	80	102	156	146	0	1823
14	Rod Nash Racing (s)	54	54	96	82	60	98	74	102	38	Ret	56	90	54	32	0	890
15	Ford Rising Stars Racing (s)			60	90	18	80	64	72	102	96	50	72	92	48	0	848
16	Paul Weel Racing (s)	45	88	40	68	68	36	48	74	84	WD	52	34	66	64	0	771
17	Team Kiwi Racing (s)	102	58	66	46	66	42	40	72	DNS	Ret	92	46	64	48	0	742
Pos	Team	ADE (South Australia)	EAS (New South Wales)	HAM (New Zealand)	BAR (Western Australia)	SAN (Victoria (state))	HID (Northern Territory)	QLD (Queensland)	WIN (Victoria (state))	PHI (Victoria (state))	BAT (New South Wales)	SUR (Queensland)	BAH (Bahrain)	SYM (Tasmania)	ORA (New South Wales)	Pen.	Pts.

Colour	Result
Gold	Winner
Silver	Second place
Bronze	Third place
Green	Points classification
Blue	Non-points classification
Blue	Non-classified finish (NC)
Purple	Retired, not classified (Ret)
Red	Did not qualify (DNQ)
Red	Did not pre-qualify (DNPQ)
Black	Disqualified (DSQ)
White	Did not start (DNS)
White	Withdrew (WD)
White	Race cancelled (C)
Blank	Did not practice (DNP)
Blank	Did not arrive (DNA)
Blank	Excluded (EX)

- (s) denotes a single-car team.

=== Manufacturers Championship ===
Ford won the Manufacturers Championship having won more rounds than rival Holden.

== See also ==
2008 V8 Supercar season
