= 2006 Porsche Supercup =

14th Porsche Supercup season

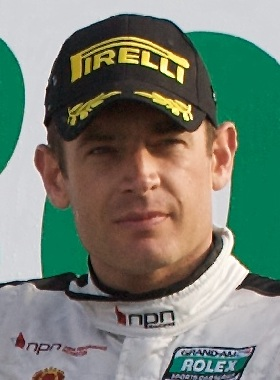
Richard Westbrook (pictured in 2010) won his first Drivers' Championship title

The 2006 Porsche Michelin Supercup season was the 14th Porsche Supercup season. The races were all supporting races in the 2006 Formula One season. It travelled to nine circuits across Europe, to Bahrain and a double-header at Indianapolis, USA.

== Rule changes for 2006 ==
- HANS device became mandatory for all (part and full time) Porsche Michelin Supercup drivers from 2006 season onwards to reduce risk of driver's head and neck injuries for safety reasons.

== Teams and drivers ==
Team	No.	Drivers	Rounds
(Austria) Lechner Racing School Team	1	(Italy) Alessandro Zampedri	All
(Austria) Lechner Racing School Team	2	(France) Cyrille Sauvage	1
(Austria) Lechner Racing School Team	2	(Netherlands) Patrick Huisman	2–11
(Austria) Lechner Racing School Team	22	(France) Nicolas Armindo	1
(Germany) Kadach Racing Team	3	(Belgium) David Saelens	1–10
(Germany) Kadach Racing Team	4	(France) Fabrice Walfisch	1–5, 9–10
(Germany) Kadach Racing Team	4	(United Kingdom) David Ashburn	6
(Germany) Kadach Racing Team	4	(United States) Simon Sobrero	7
(Germany) PZ Koblenz – Team SPS	5	(Germany) Uwe Alzen	All
(Germany) PZ Koblenz – Team SPS	6	(Germany) Jörg Stephan	1–3
(Germany) PZ Koblenz – Team SPS	6	(Switzerland) Marc Benz	4–11
(Austria) Konrad Motorsport	7	(Germany) Tim Bergmeister	1
(Austria) Konrad Motorsport	7	(Austria) Hannes Neuhauser	2–11
(Austria) Konrad Motorsport	8	(Germany) Michael Schrey	1–4, 6–11
(Austria) Konrad Motorsport	8	(Belgium) Michel Neugarten	5
(Austria) Konrad Motorsport	74	(United States) Jay Policastro	9
(United States) Orbit Racing	74	(United States) Jay Policastro	7
(Belgium) Mühlner Motorsport	9	(Belgium) David Dermont	1–6
(Belgium) Mühlner Motorsport	9	(Belgium) Jean-Francois Hemroulle	11
(Belgium) Mühlner Motorsport	10	(Belgium) Geoffroy Horion	1–6
(Belgium) Mühlner Motorsport	10	(Germany) Jörg Hardt	11
(Netherlands) Jetstream Motorsport PZ Essen	11	(Switzerland) Philip Beyrer	All
(Netherlands) Jetstream Motorsport PZ Essen	12	(Netherlands) Simon Frederiks	1–6, 8–11
(Netherlands) Jetstream Motorsport PZ Essen	12	(Germany) Oliver Freymuth	7
(Germany) MRS-PC Service Team PZM	14	(Germany) Georg Braun	1
(Germany) MRS-PC Service Team PZM	14	(Brazil) Alexandre Funari Negrão	4–5
(Germany) MRS-PC Service Team PZM	14	(Sweden) Jimmy Jacobsson	6
(Germany) MRS-PC Service Team PZM	14	(United States) Will Langhorne	7–11
(Germany) MRS-PC Service Team PZM	14	(Netherlands) Menno Kuus	2
(Germany) MRS-PC Service Team PZM	15	(Netherlands) Menno Kuus	10
(Germany) MRS-PC Service Team PZM	15	(Netherlands) Duncan Huisman	1–3
(Germany) MRS-PC Service Team PZM	15	(Netherlands) Roeland Voerman	4–5, 8–9
(Germany) MRS-PC Service Team PZM	15	(United Kingdom) Kelvin Burt	6–7
(Germany) MRS-PC Service Team PZM	15	(Germany) Ralf Kalaschek	11
(Netherlands) Morellato Racing Team PZ Essen	16	(France) Olivier Maximin	1–6, 8
(Netherlands) Morellato Racing Team PZ Essen	16	(United Kingdom) Richard Williams	7
(Netherlands) Morellato Racing Team PZ Essen	16	(Brazil) Cacá Bueno	9–10
(Netherlands) Morellato Racing Team PZ Essen	16	(Netherlands) Jeroen Bleekemolen	11
(Netherlands) Morellato Racing Team PZ Essen	17	(United Kingdom) Richard Westbrook	All
(Netherlands) Morellato Stars Team	18	(Brazil) Luciano Burti	1
(Netherlands) Morellato Stars Team	18	(Italy) Jimmy Ghione	2
(Netherlands) Morellato Stars Team	18	(United Kingdom) Colin McRae	3, 5
(Netherlands) Morellato Stars Team	18	(United States) Terry Heath	7
(Netherlands) Morellato Stars Team	18	(Netherlands) Pim van Riet	8
(Netherlands) Morellato Stars Team	18	(United Kingdom) Phil Quaife	11
(Netherlands) Morellato Stars Team	18	(Netherlands) Dick Postel	4
(Netherlands) Morellato Stars Team	19	(Netherlands) Dick Postel	8
(Netherlands) Morellato Stars Team	19	(Bahrain) Jaber Al Khalifa	1, 7
(Netherlands) Morellato Stars Team	19	(Italy) Edoardo Cicorini	2
(Netherlands) Morellato Stars Team	19	(Italy) Kristian Ghedina	3–4
(Netherlands) Morellato Stars Team	19	(Indonesia) Maher Algadri	5
(Netherlands) Morellato Stars Team	19	(United Kingdom) Richard Williams	11
(Netherlands) Harders Plaza Racing	20	(Netherlands) Robert van der Berg	All
(Netherlands) Harders Plaza Racing	21	(Belgium) Chris Mattheus	1–5
(Netherlands) Harders Plaza Racing	21	(United Kingdom) Luke Hines	6
(Netherlands) Harders Plaza Racing	21	(Netherlands) Ardi van der Hoek	7
(Netherlands) Harders Plaza Racing	21	(Netherlands) Arjan van der Zwaan	8–9, 11
(Netherlands) Harders Plaza Racing	21	(Germany) Klaus Abbelen	10
(Austria) Priority Racing Team Lechner	23	(Republic of Ireland) Damien Faulkner	1
(Netherlands) Team Bleekemolen	24	(Netherlands) Sebastiaan Bleekemolen	2–6, 8
(Netherlands) Team Bleekemolen	24	(United States) Thomas Pank	7
(Netherlands) Team Bleekemolen	24	(Netherlands) Michael Bleekemolen	9-11
(Netherlands) Team Bleekemolen	25	(Netherlands) Michael Bleekemolen	2–3, 5, 7
(Netherlands) Team Bleekemolen	25	(Germany) Oliver Freymuth	4, 6, 8–11
(Germany) Mamerow Racing PZ Essen	26	(Germany) Christian Mamerow	3
(Germany) UPS Porsche Junior Team	28	(Germany) Jan Seyffarth	1, 4–6, 9–11
(Germany) UPS Porsche Junior Team	29	(Germany) Lance David Arnold	1, 4–6, 9–11
(Germany) Attempto Racing	34	(Germany) Dietmar Haggenmüller	2
(Germany) Attempto Racing	43	(Germany) Dominik Neumeyr	2
(Germany) Tolimit Motorsport	39	(Germany) Christian Menzel	All
(Germany) Tolimit Motorsport	46	(Austria) Richard Lietz	All
(Germany) Farnbacher Racing – PZ Nürnberg	55	(Germany) Dirk Werner	1–2
(Germany) Farnbacher Racing – PZ Nürnberg	55	(United States) Ian Baas	11
(Germany) Farnbacher Racing – PZ Nürnberg	66	(Italy) Angelo Proietti	2, 11
(Germany) Farnbacher Racing – PZ Nürnberg	77	(Netherlands) Patrick Huisman	1
(United Kingdom) IN2RACING	70	(United Kingdom) Michael Richards	6
(United Kingdom) IN2RACING	71	(United Kingdom) Richard Williams	6
(United Kingdom) IRWIN Redline Racing	72	(United Kingdom) Danny Watts	6
(United Kingdom) IRWIN Redline Racing	73	(United Kingdom) Jason Young	6
(United States) Aasco Motorsport	75	(United States) Pat Flanagan	7
(United States) Aasco Motorsport	76	(United States) Gary Becker	7
(United States) Aasco Motorsport	77	(United States) Warren Chang	7
(United States) Aasco Motorsport	78	(United States) Joe Kunz	7
(United States) Farnbacher Loles Motorsports	79	(United States) Ian Baas	7
(United States) Farnbacher Loles Motorsports	80	(Venezuela) Ricardo Imery	7
(France) Nourry Competition	81	(France) Michel Nourry	8
(France) Equipe Alméras Frères	82	(France) Philippe Alméras	8
(Germany) Porsche AG	88	(Bahrain) Salman Al Khalifa	1
(Germany) Porsche AG	88	(Germany) Markus Winkelhock	3
(Germany) Porsche AG	88	(Brazil) Bruno Senna	5
(Germany) Porsche AG	88	(Italy) Arturo Merzario	11
(Germany) Porsche AG	89	(Bahrain) Fahad Al Musalam	1

== Race calendar and results ==
Round		Circuit	Country	Date	Pole position	Fastest lap	Winning driver	Winning team	Report
1	R	Bahrain International Circuit	Bahrain	12 March	(Belgium) David Saelens	(Germany) Uwe Alzen	(Germany) Uwe Alzen	(Germany) SPS Automotive	Report
2	R	(Italy) Autodromo Enzo e Dino Ferrari	Italy	23 April	(United Kingdom) Richard Westbrook	(Austria) Richard Lietz	(United Kingdom) Richard Westbrook	(Netherlands) Racing Team Morelatto	Report
3	R	(Germany) Nürburgring	Germany	7 May	(United Kingdom) Richard Westbrook	(United Kingdom) Richard Westbrook	(United Kingdom) Richard Westbrook	(Netherlands) Racing Team Morelatto	Report
4	R	(Spain) Circuit de Catalunya	Spain	14 May	(Austria) Richard Lietz	(Austria) Richard Lietz	(Belgium) David Saelens	(Germany) Kadach Racing	Report
5	R	Circuit de Monaco	Monaco	27 May	(Austria) Richard Lietz	(Austria) Richard Lietz	(Austria) Richard Lietz	(Germany) Tolimit Motorsport	Report
6	R	(United Kingdom) Silverstone Circuit	United Kingdom	11 June	(Germany) Uwe Alzen	(Germany) Uwe Alzen	(Germany) Uwe Alzen	(Germany) SPS Automotive	Report
7	R1	(United States) Indianapolis Motor Speedway	United States	1 July	(United Kingdom) Richard Westbrook	(United Kingdom) Richard Westbrook	(United Kingdom) Richard Westbrook	(Netherlands) Racing Team Morelatto	Report
7	R2	(United States) Indianapolis Motor Speedway	United States	2 July	(United Kingdom) Richard Westbrook	(United Kingdom) Richard Westbrook	(United Kingdom) Richard Westbrook	(Netherlands) Racing Team Morelatto	Report
8	R	(France) Circuit de Nevers Magny-Cours	France	16 July	(Germany) Uwe Alzen	(Germany) Uwe Alzen	(Germany) Uwe Alzen	(Germany) SPS Automotive	Report
9	R	(Germany) Hockenheimring	Germany	30 July	(Austria) Richard Lietz	(Austria) Richard Lietz	(Austria) Richard Lietz	(Germany) Tolimit Motorsport	Report
10	R	(Hungary) Hungaroring	Hungary	6 August	(Netherlands) Patrick Huisman	(Germany) Uwe Alzen	(Netherlands) Patrick Huisman	(Austria) Walter Lechner Racing	Report
11	R	(Italy) Autodromo Nazionale Monza	Italy	10 September	(Austria) Richard Lietz	(Germany) Uwe Alzen	(Germany) Uwe Alzen	(Germany) SPS Automotive	Report

== Championship standings ==
Position	1st	2nd	3rd	4th	5th	6th	7th	8th	9th	10th	11th	12th	13th	14th	15th	Ref
Points	20	18	16	14	12	10	9	8	7	6	5	4	3	2	1	

Pos	Driver	BHR (Bahrain)	IMO (Italy)	NÜR (Germany)	CAT (Spain)	MON (Monaco)	SIL (United Kingdom)	IND (United States)		MAG (France)	HOC (Germany)	HUN (Hungary)	MZA (Italy)	Points
1	(United Kingdom) Richard Westbrook	2	**1**	**1**	3	3	2	**1**	**1**	4	3	3	2	212
2	(Germany) Uwe Alzen	1	Ret	7	4	4	**1**	9	9	**1**	2	5	1	166
3	(Austria) Richard Lietz	8	11	2	**22**	**1**	3	Ret^{1}	4	2	**1**	4	**5**	157
4	(Netherlands) Patrick Huisman	5	7	5	7	6	5	Ret	3	3	9	**1**	3	144
5	(Belgium) David Saelens	**3**	4	3	1	2	6	10	Ret	5	13	Ret		120
6	(Germany) Christian Menzel	7	2	6	Ret	5	4	Ret	Ret	7	6	2	6	114
7	(Italy) Alessandro Zampedri	12	8	9	9	7	7	Ret	2	6	4	17	Ret^{1}	100
8	(France) Fabrice Walfisch	4	5	4	2	DNS					Ret^{1}	Ret		59
9	(Germany) Michael Schrey	Ret	14	17	16		16	7	5	Ret	11	9	11	59
10	(Netherlands) Robert van den Berg	13	17	14	12	9	Ret	6	Ret	12	22†	12	19	58
11	(Switzerland) Phillip Beyrer	26	13	16	Ret	Ret	13	4	10	Ret	10	8	Ret	54
12	(Austria) Hannes Neuhauser		10	13	11	Ret	11	Ret	Ret	Ret^{1}	8	11	22†	51
13	(Netherlands) Michael Bleekemolen		16	20		11		5	12		20	15	17	48
14	(Switzerland) Marc Benz				13	13	18	Ret^{1}	8	8	7	Ret	Ret	48
15	(Belgium) Geoffroy Horion	16	3	8	8	Ret	8							45
16	(France) Olivier Maximin	14	12	18	10	18	10			10				33
17	(Netherlands) Simon Frederiks	20	18	19	21	16	Ret			13	16	14	18	28
18	(Netherlands) Sebastiaan Bleekemolen		9	15	Ret	19	14			11				23
19	(Belgium) David Dermont	17	15	24†	15	14	DNS							13
20	(Germany) Dirk Werner	6	6											10
21	(Germany) Tim Bergmeister	11												7
22	(Netherlands) Duncan Huisman	Ret	Ret	10										6
23	(France) Cyrille Sauvage	18												1
24	(Belgium) Chris Mattheus	25	22	22	23	20								1
25	(Germany) Jörg Stephan	22	Ret	Ret										0
guest drivers ineligible for championship points
	(United Kingdom) Kelvin Burt						23†	2	6					0
	(United States) Ian Baas							3	7				12	0
	(Netherlands) Jeroen Bleekemolen												4	0
	(Germany) Lance David Arnold	10			6	8	9				5	7	9	0
	(Germany) Jan Seyffarth	9			5	12	12				12	Ret	7	0
	(Brazil) Cacá Bueno										14	6		0
	(United Kingdom) Richard Williams						15	8	Ret				10	0
	(Germany) Jörg Hardt												8	0
	(France) Philippe Almeras									9				0
	(United Kingdom) Colin McRae			23†		10								0
	(Netherlands) Menno Kuus		19									10		0
	(Germany) Markus Winkelhock			11										0
	(United States) Will Langhorne							11	14	15	15	16	15	0
	(Netherlands) Ardi van der Hoek							Ret	11					0
	(Germany) Christian Mamerow			12										0
	(Venezuela) Ricardo Imery							12	13					0
	(Germany) Oliver Freymuth				18		19	13	Ret	17	17	13	Ret	0
	(Italy) Arturo Merzario												13	0
	(Brazil) Alexandre Funari Negrão				14	17								0
	(United States) Jay Policastro							14	15		19			0
	(Netherlands) Roeland Voerman				19	Ret				14	18			0
	(Belgium) Jean-François Hemroulle												14	0
	(Republic of Ireland) Damien Faulkner	15												0
	(Belgium) Michel Neugarten					15								0
	(United States) Joe Kunz							15	17					0
	(United States) Pat Flanagan							16	Ret					0
	(United States) Terry L. Heath							20	16					0
	(Netherlands) Pim van Riet									16				0
	(United Kingdom) Phil Quaife												16	0
	(Italy) Kristian Ghedina			21	17									0
	(United Kingdom) Luke Hines						17							0
	(Bahrain) Jaber Al-Khalifa	24						17	18					0
	(United States) Gary Becker							18	19					0
	(France) Michel Nourry									18				0
	(France) Nicolas Armindo	19												0
	(United States) Warren Chang							19	Ret					0
	(Netherlands) Dick Postel				20					19				0
	(Germany) Dominik Neumeyer		20											0
	(United Kingdom) Michael Richards						20							0
	(United States) Thomas E. Pank							21	20					0
	(Italy) Angelo Proietti		21										20	0
	(Netherlands) Arjan van der Zwan									Ret	21		Ret	0
	(Bahrain) Salman Al-Khalifa	21												0
	(United Kingdom) David Ashburn						21							0
	(Germany) Ralf Kalaschek												21	0
	(United Kingdom) Danny Watts						22							0
	(Bahrain) Fahad Al Musalam	23												0
	(Germany) Dietmar Haggenmüller		23											0
	(Germany) Georg Braun	27†												0
	(United States) Simon Sobrero							Ret	Ret					0
	(Brazil) Luciano Burti	Ret												0
	(Italy) Edoardo Cicorini		Ret											0
	(Italy) Jimmy Ghione		Ret											0
	(Brazil) Bruno Senna					Ret								0
	(Sweden) Jimmy Jacobsson						Ret							0
	(United Kingdom) Jason Young						Ret							0
	(Germany) Klaus Abbelen											Ret		0
	(Indonesia) Maher Algadri					DNQ								0
Pos	Driver	BHR (Bahrain)	IMO (Italy)	NÜR (Germany)	CAT (Spain)	MON (Monaco)	SIL (United Kingdom)	IND (United States)		MAG (France)	HOC (Germany)	HUN (Hungary)	MZA (Italy)	Points

Colour	Result
Gold	Winner
Silver	Second place
Bronze	Third place
Green	Points classification
Blue	Non-points classification
Blue	Non-classified finish (NC)
Purple	Retired, not classified (Ret)
Red	Did not qualify (DNQ)
Red	Did not pre-qualify (DNPQ)
Black	Disqualified (DSQ)
White	Did not start (DNS)
White	Withdrew (WD)
White	Race cancelled (C)
Blank	Did not practice (DNP)
Blank	Did not arrive (DNA)
Blank	Excluded (EX)

**Bold** – Pole
Italics – Fastest Lap

† — Drivers did not finish the race, but were classified as they completed over 90% of the race distance.

1. – Scored points despite not finishing the race or being classified.

=== Teams' Championship ===
Pos	Team	BHR (Bahrain)	IMO (Italy)	NÜR (Germany)	CAT (Spain)	MON (Monaco)	SIL (United Kingdom)	IND (United States)		MAG (France)	HOC (Germany)	HUN (Hungary)	MZA (Italy)	Points
1	(Monaco) Racing Team Morellato - PZ Essen	2	1	1	3	3	2	1	1	4	3	3	2	280
1	(Monaco) Racing Team Morellato - PZ Essen	14	12	18	10	18	10	8	Ret	10	14	6	4	280
2	(Germany) tolimit Motorsport	7	2	2	22	1	3	Ret^{1}	4	2	1	2	5	259
2	(Germany) tolimit Motorsport	8	11	6	Ret	5	4	Ret	Ret	7	6	4	6	259
3	(Austria) Lechner Racing School Team	12	7	5	7	6	5	Ret	2	3	4	1	3	224
3	(Austria) Lechner Racing School Team	18	8	9	9	7	7	Ret	3	6	9	17	Ret	224
4	(Germany) SPS automotive Performance	1	Ret	7	4	4	1	9	8	1	2	5	1	201
4	(Germany) SPS automotive Performance	22	Ret	Ret	13	13	18	Ret	9	8	7	Ret	Ret	201
5	(Germany) Kadach Racing Team	3	4	3	1	2	6	10	Ret	5	13	Ret		176
5	(Germany) Kadach Racing Team	4	5	4	2	DNS	21	Ret	Ret		Ret	Ret		176
6	(Germany) Konrad Motorsport	11	10	13	11	15	11	7	5	Ret	8	9	11	104
6	(Germany) Konrad Motorsport	Ret	14	17	16	Ret	16	Ret	Ret	Ret	11	11	22†	104
7	(Germany) MRS-PC Service Team PZM	27†	19	10	14	17	23†	2	6	14	15	10	15	74
7	(Germany) MRS-PC Service Team PZM	Ret	Ret		19	Ret	Ret	11	14	15	18	16	21	74
8	(Netherlands) Jetstream Motorsport PZ Essen	20	13	16	21	16	13	4	10	13	10	8	18	70
8	(Netherlands) Jetstream Motorsport PZ Essen	26	18	19	Ret	Ret	Ret	13	Ret	Ret	16	14	Ret	70
9	(Netherlands) Team Bleekemolen		9	15	18	11	14	5	12	11	17	13	17	62
9	(Netherlands) Team Bleekemolen		16	20	Ret	19	19	21	20	17	20	15	Ret	62
10	(Belgium) Mühlner Motorsport	16	3	8	8	14	8						8	56
10	(Belgium) Mühlner Motorsport	17	15	24†	15	Ret	DNS						14	56
11	(Netherlands) Harders Plaza Racing PZ Essen	13	17	14	12	9	17	6	11	12	21	12	19	56
11	(Netherlands) Harders Plaza Racing PZ Essen	25	22	22	23	20	Ret	Ret	Ret	Ret	22†	Ret	Ret	56
12	(Monaco) Morellato Stars Team	24	Ret	21	17	10		17	16	16			10	36
12	(Monaco) Morellato Stars Team	Ret	Ret	23†	20	DNQ		20	18	19			16	36
13	(Germany) Farnbacher Racing	5	6										12	22
13	(Germany) Farnbacher Racing	6	21										20	22
Guest teams ineligible for championship points
	(United States) Farnbacher Loles Motorsports							3	7					0
	(United States) Farnbacher Loles Motorsports							12	13					0
	(Germany) UPS Porsche Junior Team	9			5	8	9				5	7	7	0
	(Germany) UPS Porsche Junior Team	10			6	12	12				12	Ret	9	0
	(France) Equipe Alméras Frères									9				0
	(Germany) Porsche AG	21		11		Ret							13	0
	(Germany) Porsche AG	23												0
	(Germany) Mamerow Racing PZ Essen			12										0
	(United States) Orbit Racing							14	15					0
	(Austria) Priority Racing Team Lechner	15												0
	(United Kingdom) IN2RACING						15							0
	(United Kingdom) IN2RACING						20							0
	(United States) Aasco Motorsports							15	17					0
	(United States) Aasco Motorsports							16	19					0
	(France) Nourry Competition									18				0
	(Germany) Attempto Racing		20											0
	(Germany) Attempto Racing		23											0
	(United Kingdom) IRWIN Redline Racing						22							0
	(United Kingdom) IRWIN Redline Racing						Ret							0
Pos	Team	BHR (Bahrain)	IMO (Italy)	NÜR (Germany)	CAT (Spain)	MON (Monaco)	SIL (United Kingdom)	IND (United States)		MAG (France)	HOC (Germany)	HUN (Hungary)	MZA (Italy)	Points
