= 2008 Desert 400 =

2008 Supercar Championship event

(Bahrain) 2008 Gulf Air Desert 400
Event Information
- Round 12 of 14 in the 2008 V8 Supercar Championship Series
- Date: 6–8 November 2008
- Location: Sakhir, Bahrain
- Venue: Bahrain International Circuit
- Weather: Fine

Results
Race 1
Distance	32 laps	120 km
Pole position	Jamie Whincup; Triple Eight Race Engineering	1:25.0415
Winner	Jamie Whincup; Triple Eight Race Engineering	50:29.8677
Race 2
Distance	32 laps	120 km
Winner	Jamie Whincup; Triple Eight Race Engineering	49:37.2508
Race 3
Distance	32 laps	120 km
Winner	Jamie Whincup; Triple Eight Race Engineering	51:07.5065
Round Results
First	Jamie Whincup; Triple Eight Race Engineering	300 pts
Second	Craig Lowndes; Triple Eight Race Engineering	264 pts
Third	Russell Ingall; Paul Morris Motorsport	246 pts

The 2008 Gulf Air Desert 400 was the twelfth round of the 2008 V8 Supercar season. It was held on the weekend of the 6 to 8 November at the Bahrain International Circuit in Bahrain.

== Qualifying ==
Qualifying was held on Friday 7 November 2008.

== Race 1 ==
Race 1 was held on Friday 7 November 2008. Whincup leapt away while a fierce dice erupted between Lowndes, Todd Kelly and Tander. A forceful move on the second lap saw Kelly muscle his way past Lowndes and Tander. Steven Johnson slipped into third behind Kelly as Tander and Lowndes were slow away from the hairpin. Further back in the pack a tangle saw Michael Patrizi and Mark Skaife spun backwards, also tangling with Michael Caruso, Jason Richards and Andrew Thompson, bringing out the safety car. Skaife, Richards and Patrizi had too much damage to continue.

At the restart Steven Johnson clawed into second briefly before dropping back behind Kelly again. Lowndes took third from Johnson. Lap 9 saw Whincup, Kelly, James Courtney and Russell Ingall to put of the front runners. The following lap saw Lowndes, Tander, Will Davison and Mark Winterbottom. A slow stop and exit saw Lowndes leap frog Kelly into second place. Tander moved into fourth ahead of Courtney while Davison pulled over at pit exit, overcome by fumes. Fabian Coulthard spun into the turn 4 sand trap after contact from Jason Bright, for which Bright later was given a drive-through penalty. The resultant safety car triggered Johnson's pit stop from the lead with Rick Kelly and Steven Richards also stopping.

At the restart Whincup, Lowndes and Todd Kelly leapt away while further back in the field on the second lap contact between Tander and Winterbottom saw Tander spun in front of the pack. Tander dropped to the tail of the field while Winterbottom was assigned a drive-through penalty. Coulthard stopped out on the track trying to limp a car home with a punctured front right tyre and Patrizi spun Jack Perkins around.

Paul Morris briefly held fourth on pit stop strategy but soon lost places to Lee Holdsworth, Courtney and team-mate Ingall. Todd Kelly was controversially given a drive-through penalty, taking away his, and the team's, best result of the season, for over-taking the safety car at its second deployment.

Team Vodafone continued on to claim a race 1-2, ahead of Holdsworth, Ingall, Courtney, Johnson, Shane van Gisbergen, Steven Richards, Rick Kelly and Greg Murphy.

== Race 2 ==
Race 2 was held on Saturday 8 November 2008. Whincup leap away with Ingall in pursuit ahead of battling pair Courtney and Lowndes with Johnson. Holdsworth overtook Van Gisbergen for sixth.

Paul Dumbrell spun on the second lap after contact with Michael Caruso. Local Bahraini guest driver Fahad Al Musalem stopped with a broken gearbox in the Team Kiwi Ford. Andrew Thompson spun and stopped at turn 1 after the right rear tyre delaminated, triggering a safety car.

At the restart Whincup led from Ingall, Lowndes, Courtney, Holdsworth, Richards, Johnson and Winterbottom. Richards pounced on Holdsworth at turn 1 while further Todd Kelly picked off a few cars including Garth Tander. Van Gisbergen was smoking at the front left corner tyre rubbing after contact Van Gisbergen lost control, hitting Jack Perkins and spinning Rick Kelly. Van Gisbergen later received a drive-through penalty.

A fierce dice between Courtney and Winterbottom saw the Ford Performance Racing driver move into fourth place on lap 23, the following lap Steven Richards got Courtney as well, with Holdsworth and Todd Kelly closing behind. The dice between those three became hard fought with Courtney suffering for tyre grip but still plenty of power with Will Davison joining the fight by lap 26.

Whincup raced on to win from Ingall, Lowndes, Winterbottom, Richards, Todd Kelly, Courtney, Johnson, Morris and Davison.

== Race 3 ==
Race 3 was held on Saturday 8 November 2008. Russell Ingall led from the start, fighting with Jamie Whincup for the lead with Lowndes and Winterbottom fighting for third.

Third lap into the first corner and Steven Johnson ran into the back of Todd Kelly, spinning the Jack Daniels Commodore. Will Davison ran into his team-mate Johnson. Jason Bright and Mark Skaife made contact with Skaife then hitting his teammate Garth Tander. Skaife was out on the spot with Tander pitting for a new right rear tyre.

At the restart Ingall again overtook Whincup. Whincup later retook the lead prior to the beginning of the compulsory pit stops.

During the stops Craig Lowndes was able to get the better of Mark Winterbottom for what would become third position. Safety was called for Todd Kelly's expired Commodore, the car stopped on the circuit

Rick Kelly and Cameron McConville made contact and spun while the bunched field at the restart allowed James Courtney to pass Winterbottom, then move into third by taking advantage of a slow-out-of-the-corner Russell Ingall who had just lost second to Lowndes. On lap 25 Courtney pounced on Lowndes and brakes for second. Lap 28 saw Winterbottom take fourth from Ingall.

Whincup pulled clear of Courtney who by race end had to defend from Lowndes. The result saw the first ever 1-2 finish for Team Vodafone. Fifth spot behind Winterbottom was enough for Russell Ingall to claim third for the round, the best Holden driver for the weekend.

== Race results ==
=== Qualifying ===
Pos	No	Name	Car	Team	Part 3	Part 2	Part 1
1	88	(Australia) Jamie Whincup	Ford BF Falcon	Triple Eight Race Engineering	1:25.0415		
2	888	(Australia) Craig Lowndes	Ford BF Falcon	Triple Eight Race Engineering	1:25.0624		
3	7	(Australia) Todd Kelly	Holden VE Commodore	Perkins Engineering	1:25.1556		
4	17	(Australia) Steven Johnson	Ford BF Falcon	Dick Johnson Racing	1:25.3874		
5	1	(Australia) Garth Tander	Holden VE Commodore	Holden Racing Team	1:25.4116		
6	18	(Australia) Will Davison	Ford BF Falcon	Dick Johnson Racing	1:25.4481		
7	39	(Australia) Russell Ingall	Holden VE Commodore	Paul Morris Motorsport	1:25.4736		
8	6	(New Zealand) Steven Richards	Ford BF Falcon	Ford Performance Racing	1:25.5114		
9	5	(Australia) Mark Winterbottom	Ford BF Falcon	Ford Performance Racing	1:25.5967		
10	4	(Australia) James Courtney	Ford BF Falcon	Stone Brothers Racing	1:25.7556		
11	15	(Australia) Rick Kelly	Holden VE Commodore	HSV Dealer Team		1:25.5289	
12	25	(Australia) Jason Bright	Ford BF Falcon	Britek Motorsport		1:25.5405	
13	9	(New Zealand) Shane van Gisbergen	Ford BF Falcon	Stone Brothers Racing		1:25.6020	
14	33	(Australia) Lee Holdsworth	Holden VE Commodore	Garry Rogers Motorsport		1:25.6282	
15	16	(Australia) Paul Dumbrell	Holden VE Commodore	HSV Dealer Team		1:25.6311	
16	2	(Australia) Mark Skaife	Holden VE Commodore	Holden Racing Team		1:25.7070	
17	111	(New Zealand) Fabian Coulthard	Ford BF Falcon	Paul Cruickshank Racing		1:25.7542	
18	11	(Australia) Jack Perkins	Holden VE Commodore	Perkins Engineering		1:26.0854	
19	26	(Australia) Marcus Marshall	Ford BF Falcon	Britek Motorsport		1:26.1087	
20	777	(Australia) Michael Patrizi	Ford BF Falcon	Ford Rising Stars Racing		1:26.3251	
21	14	(Australia) Cameron McConville	Holden VE Commodore	Brad Jones Racing			1:25.7938
22	34	(Australia) Michael Caruso	Holden VE Commodore	Garry Rogers Motorsport			1:25.7999
23	51	(New Zealand) Greg Murphy	Holden VE Commodore	Tasman Motorsport			1:25.8425
24	3	(New Zealand) Jason Richards	Holden VE Commodore	Tasman Motorsport			1:25.9215
25	67	(Australia) Paul Morris	Holden VE Commodore	Paul Morris Motorsport			1:26.0057
26	50	(Australia) Andrew Thompson	Holden VE Commodore	Paul Weel Racing			1:26.0388
27	55	(Australia) Tony D'Alberto	Holden VE Commodore	Rod Nash Racing			1:26.0600
28	12	(Australia) Andrew Jones	Holden VE Commodore	Brad Jones Racing			1:26.0721
29	021	(Bahrain) Fahad Al Musalam	Ford BF Falcon	Team Kiwi Racing			1:28.8069

=== Race 1 ===
Pos	No.	Name	Team	Vehicle	Laps	Time/Retired	Grid
1	88	(Australia) Jamie Whincup	Triple Eight Race Engineering	Ford Falcon (BF)	32		
2	888	(Australia) Craig Lowndes	Triple Eight Race Engineering	Ford Falcon (BF)	32		
3	33	(Australia) Lee Holdsworth	Garry Rogers Motorsport	Holden Commodore (VE)	32		
4	39	(Australia) Russell Ingall	Paul Morris Motorsport	Holden Commodore (VE)	32		
5	4	(Australia) James Courtney	Stone Brothers Racing	Ford Falcon (BF)	32		
6	17	(Australia) Steven Johnson	Dick Johnson Racing	Ford Falcon (BF)	32		
7	9	(New Zealand) Shane van Gisbergen	Stone Brothers Racing	Ford Falcon (BF)	32		
8	6	(New Zealand) Steven Richards	Ford Performance Racing	Ford Falcon (BF)	32		
9	15	(Australia) Rick Kelly	HSV Dealer Team	Holden Commodore (VE)	32		
10	51	(New Zealand) Greg Murphy	Tasman Motorsport	Holden Commodore (VE)	32		
11	67	(Australia) Paul Morris	Paul Morris Motorsport	Holden Commodore (VE)	32		
12	16	(Australia) Paul Dumbrell	HSV Dealer Team	Holden Commodore (VE)	32		
13	14	(Australia) Cameron McConville	Brad Jones Racing	Holden Commodore (VE)	32		
14	1	(Australia) Garth Tander	Holden Racing Team	Holden Commodore (VE)	32		
15	34	(Australia) Michael Caruso	Garry Rogers Motorsport	Holden Commodore (VE)	32		
16	26	(Australia) Marcus Marshall	Britek Motorsport	Ford Falcon (BF)	32		
17	55	(Australia) Tony D'Alberto	Rod Nash Racing	Holden Commodore (VE)	32		
18	50	(Australia) Andrew Thompson	Paul Weel Racing	Holden Commodore (VE)	32		
19	11	(Australia) Jack Perkins	Perkins Engineering	Holden Commodore (VE)	32		
20	7	(Australia) Todd Kelly	Perkins Engineering	Holden Commodore (VE)	32		
21	5	(Australia) Mark Winterbottom	Ford Performance Racing	Ford Falcon (BF)	32		
22	25	(Australia) Jason Bright	Britek Motorsport	Ford Falcon (BF)	32		
23	021	(Bahrain) Fahad Al Musalam	Team Kiwi Racing	Ford Falcon (BF)	31	+ 1 lap	
24	777	(Australia) Michael Patrizi	Ford Rising Stars Racing	Ford Falcon (BF)	30	+ 2 laps	
Ret	111	(New Zealand) Fabian Coulthard	Paul Cruickshank Racing	Ford Falcon (BF)	15	Retired	
Ret	18	(Australia) Will Davison	Dick Johnson Racing	Ford Falcon (BF)	9	Retired	
Ret	3	(New Zealand) Jason Richards	Tasman Motorsport	Holden Commodore (VE)	2	Retired	
Ret	2	(Australia) Mark Skaife	Holden Racing Team	Holden Commodore (VE)	2	Retired	
Ret	12	(Australia) Andrew Jones	Brad Jones Racing	Holden Commodore (VE)	1	Retired	
Fastest Lap: Jamie Whincup (Triple Eight Race Engineering) - 1:25.2678 on lap 2

=== Race 2 ===
Pos	No.	Name	Team	Vehicle	Laps	Time/Retired	Grid
1	88	(Australia) Jamie Whincup	Triple Eight Race Engineering	Ford Falcon (BF)	32		
2	39	(Australia) Russell Ingall	Paul Morris Motorsport	Holden Commodore (VE)	32		
3	888	(Australia) Craig Lowndes	Triple Eight Race Engineering	Ford Falcon (BF)	32		
4	5	(Australia) Mark Winterbottom	Ford Performance Racing	Ford Falcon (BF)	32		
5	6	(New Zealand) Steven Richards	Ford Performance Racing	Ford Falcon (BF)	32		
6	7	(Australia) Todd Kelly	Perkins Engineering	Holden Commodore (VE)	32		
7	4	(Australia) James Courtney	Stone Brothers Racing	Ford Falcon (BF)	32		
8	17	(Australia) Steven Johnson	Dick Johnson Racing	Ford Falcon (BF)	32		
9	67	(Australia) Paul Morris	Paul Morris Motorsport	Holden Commodore (VE)	32		
10	18	(Australia) Will Davison	Dick Johnson Racing	Ford Falcon (BF)	32		
11	1	(Australia) Garth Tander	Holden Racing Team	Holden Commodore (VE)	32		
12	33	(Australia) Lee Holdsworth	Garry Rogers Motorsport	Holden Commodore (VE)	32		
13	25	(Australia) Jason Bright	Britek Motorsport	Ford Falcon (BF)	32		
14	34	(Australia) Michael Caruso	Garry Rogers Motorsport	Holden Commodore (VE)	32		
15	11	(Australia) Jack Perkins	Perkins Engineering	Holden Commodore (VE)	32		
16	111	(New Zealand) Fabian Coulthard	Paul Cruickshank Racing	Ford Falcon (BF)	32		
17	2	(Australia) Mark Skaife	Holden Racing Team	Holden Commodore (VE)	32		
18	16	(Australia) Paul Dumbrell	HSV Dealer Team	Holden Commodore (VE)	32		
19	51	(New Zealand) Greg Murphy	Tasman Motorsport	Holden Commodore (VE)	32		
20	12	(Australia) Andrew Jones	Brad Jones Racing	Holden Commodore (VE)	32		
21	26	(Australia) Marcus Marshall	Britek Motorsport	Ford Falcon (BF)	32		
22	15	(Australia) Rick Kelly	HSV Dealer Team	Holden Commodore (VE)	32		
23	777	(Australia) Michael Patrizi	Ford Rising Stars Racing	Ford Falcon (BF)	32		
24	55	(Australia) Tony D'Alberto	Rod Nash Racing	Holden Commodore (VE)	32		
25	14	(Australia) Cameron McConville	Brad Jones Racing	Holden Commodore (VE)	32		
26	9	(New Zealand) Shane van Gisbergen	Stone Brothers Racing	Ford Falcon (BF)	31	+ 1 lap	
Ret	50	(Australia) Andrew Thompson	Paul Weel Racing	Holden Commodore (VE)	14	Retired	
Ret	021	(Bahrain) Fahad Al Musalam	Team Kiwi Racing	Ford Falcon (BF)	11	Retired	
DNS	3	(New Zealand) Jason Richards	Tasman Motorsport	Holden Commodore (VE)		Did not start	
Fastest Lap: Craig Lowndes (Triple Eight Race Engineering) - 1:25.5661 on lap 2

=== Race 3 ===
Pos	No.	Name	Team	Vehicle	Laps	Time/Retired	Grid
1	88	(Australia) Jamie Whincup	Triple Eight Race Engineering	Ford Falcon (BF)	32		
2	4	(Australia) James Courtney	Stone Brothers Racing	Ford Falcon (BF)	32		
3	888	(Australia) Craig Lowndes	Triple Eight Race Engineering	Ford Falcon (BF)	32		
4	5	(Australia) Mark Winterbottom	Ford Performance Racing	Ford Falcon (BF)	32		
5	39	(Australia) Russell Ingall	Paul Morris Motorsport	Holden Commodore (VE)	32		
6	18	(Australia) Will Davison	Dick Johnson Racing	Ford Falcon (BF)	32		
7	111	(New Zealand) Fabian Coulthard	Paul Cruickshank Racing	Ford Falcon (BF)	32		
8	33	(Australia) Lee Holdsworth	Garry Rogers Motorsport	Holden Commodore (VE)	32		
9	6	(New Zealand) Steven Richards	Ford Performance Racing	Ford Falcon (BF)	32		
10	9	(New Zealand) Shane van Gisbergen	Stone Brothers Racing	Ford Falcon (BF)	32		
11	16	(Australia) Paul Dumbrell	HSV Dealer Team	Holden Commodore (VE)	32		
12	67	(Australia) Paul Morris	Paul Morris Motorsport	Holden Commodore (VE)	32		
13	17	(Australia) Steven Johnson	Dick Johnson Racing	Ford Falcon (BF)	32		
14	25	(Australia) Jason Bright	Britek Motorsport	Ford Falcon (BF)	32		
15	26	(Australia) Marcus Marshall	Britek Motorsport	Ford Falcon (BF)	32		
16	12	(Australia) Andrew Jones	Brad Jones Racing	Holden Commodore (VE)	32		
17	34	(Australia) Michael Caruso	Garry Rogers Motorsport	Holden Commodore (VE)	32		
18	51	(New Zealand) Greg Murphy	Tasman Motorsport	Holden Commodore (VE)	32		
19	55	(Australia) Tony D'Alberto	Rod Nash Racing	Holden Commodore (VE)	32		
20	15	(Australia) Rick Kelly	HSV Dealer Team	Holden Commodore (VE)	32		
21	14	(Australia) Cameron McConville	Brad Jones Racing	Holden Commodore (VE)	32		
22	777	(Australia) Michael Patrizi	Ford Rising Stars Racing	Ford Falcon (BF)	32		
23	1	(Australia) Garth Tander	Holden Racing Team	Holden Commodore (VE)	31	+ 1 lap	
24	021	(Bahrain) Fahad Al Musalam	Team Kiwi Racing	Ford Falcon (BF)	31	+ 1 lap	
Ret	50	(Australia) Andrew Thompson	Paul Weel Racing	Holden Commodore (VE)	28	Retired	
Ret	7	(Australia) Todd Kelly	Perkins Engineering	Holden Commodore (VE)	19	Retired	
Ret	11	(Australia) Jack Perkins	Perkins Engineering	Holden Commodore (VE)	13	Retired	
Ret	2	(Australia) Mark Skaife	Holden Racing Team	Holden Commodore (VE)	1	Retired	
DNS	3	(New Zealand) Jason Richards	Tasman Motorsport	Holden Commodore (VE)		Did not start	
Fastest Lap: Jamie Whincup (Triple Eight Race Engineering) - 1:25.7817 on lap 7

== Standings ==
After round 12 of 14.

Pos	No	Name	Team	Points
1	88	Jamie Whincup	TeamVodafone	2916
2	5	Mark Winterbottom	Ford Performance Racing	2729
3	1	Garth Tander	Toll Holden Racing Team	2624
4	888	Craig Lowndes	TeamVodafone	2367
5	6	Steven Richards	Ford Performance Racing	2178

== Support categories ==
The 2008 Desert 400 of the V8 Supercar Championship had three support categories.

Category	Round winner
Porsche Carrera Cup Asia	Christian Menzel (Porsche 997 GT3 Cup)
DHL Gulf Radical Cup	John Stanley (Radical SR8)
Batelco 2000cc Challenge	Mustafa Al Khan (Honda Civic)
