= Reem International Circuit =

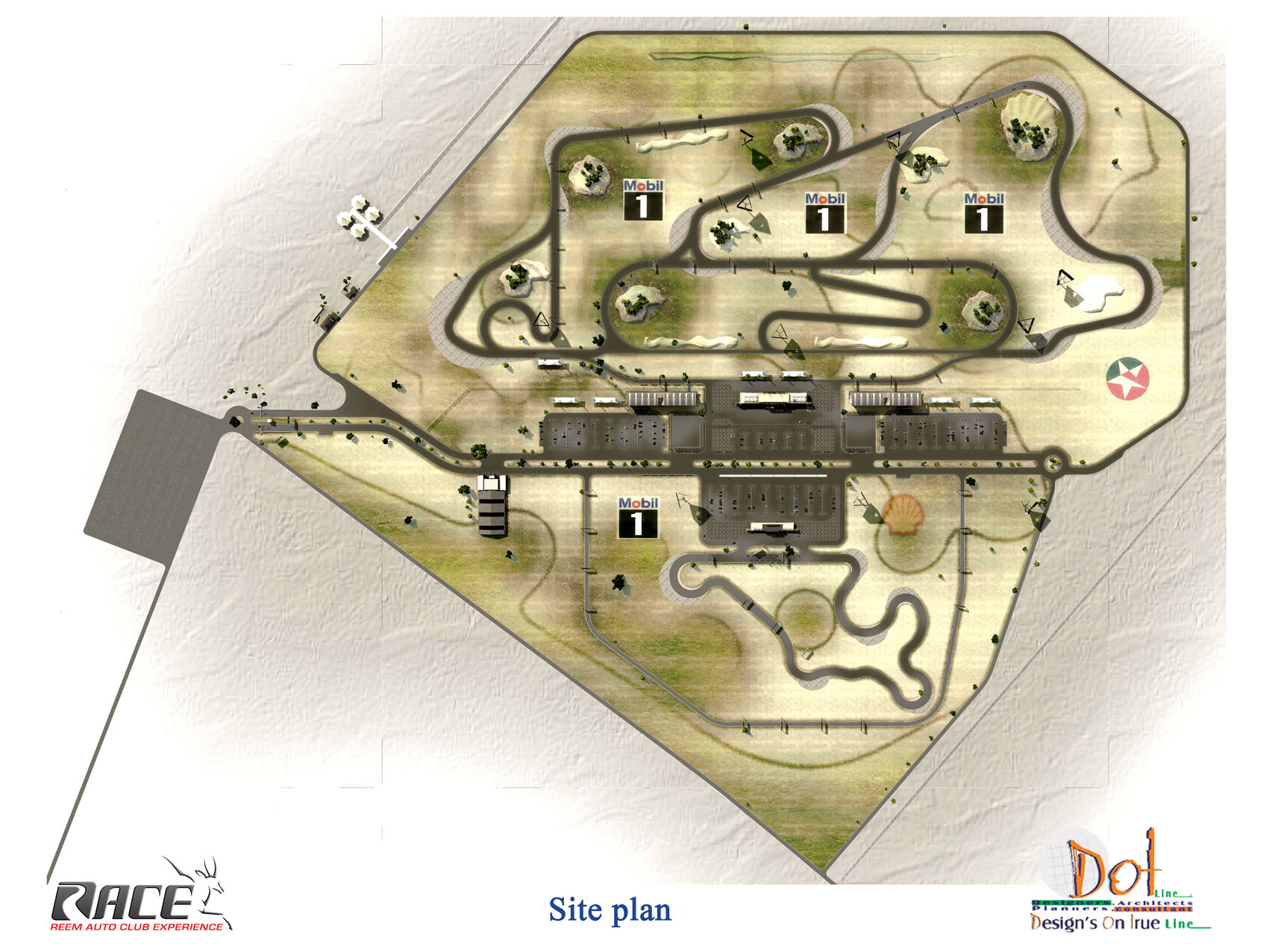
- Location: Riyadh, Saudi Arabia
- Coordinates: 24°23′15″N 45°58′43″E
- Broke ground: 2008
- Opened: 13 March 2008; 17 years ago
- Major events: Bison MINI Cup, The Lamborghini Superleggera Trofe, Porsche GT3 Middle East Championship, Lotus Cup Middle East, Saudi Radical Championship, Chevrolet Super-cars Middle East Championship, Saudi Karting Championship, Asian Motocross Final Round
- Length: 3.200 km (2.361 miles)
- Turns: 12
- Race lap record: 1:14 [Radical 1500CC]

The Reem International Circuit (Arabic: حلبة الريم الدولية) is a motorsport venue in Riyadh, Saudi Arabia, located 76 km (47 mi) west of the city on Hejaz road Exit 11.

This track sits on a sandy patch in a desert. It was originally named after the Khubayb Al Reem dunes, the natural habitat of a rare type of deer called Al Reem.

== Circuit history ==
In addition to the race events and other championships that have taken place, the management has decided to give all members the opportunity to be part of the circuit's history by competing for and recording the fastest possible times in different categories. A number of members of the track have already logged their names and times as being the fastest on the circuit for 2008 and 2009.

The 2009 racing session was competitive and filled with excitement as some of the strongest racing teams in Saudi Arabia, such as the Bison-Reem Racing Team, Al-Faisal Racing Team, Big Wheels Racing, Rahez Racing, Race & Speed Racing, Creative Tracks, and many other individuals, participated in races such as the Saudi National Radical Championship, Zain Lotus-Cup Middle East, MiniCup Saudi Arabia, Porsche GT3 Middle East Championship, Chevrolet Super-Cars Middle East Championship, Saudi Federation Karting Championship and other club racing championships.
