= Khubayb Al Reem =

Area providing habitat for a type of deer

Khubayb Al Reem is natural area that provides habitat for a rare type of deer called Al Reem, originally the name of this place came from Al Reem deer. Khubayb Al Reem is located 80 km west of Riyadh city Saudi Arabia on Hejaz road. Nowadays Khubayb Al Reem holds a motor sport venue Reem International Circuit and Wild life.
